= 1998–99 in Russian futsal =

== National team ==
Win Draw Loss

22 August 1998 Friendly (57)	Israel	0–7	Russia	Ramat Gan
			Fadeev 4' 9'; Grigoriev 12' 38'; Agafonov 27'; Iachine 32'; Ivanov 33'

25 August 1998 Friendly (58)	Israel	0–6	Russia	Ramat Gan
			Fadeev 3' 16'; Panko 4'; Malyshev 22'; Ivanov 25' 33'

1 December 1998 Friendly (59)	Netherlands	1–2	Russia	Beverwijk
			Belyi 14'; Alekberov 19'

2 December 1998 Friendly (60)	Netherlands	1–3	Russia	Grootebroek
			Malyshev 7'; Kiselev 16'; Belyi 38'

18.12.1998 EC1999 (q) (61)	Russia	24–0	Greece	Moscow
	Eremenko 1' 11' 26' 33'; Alekberov 2' 6' 21' 26' 38'; Iachine 4' 13' 13'; Panko 4' 29' 31'; Gorine 19'; Malyshev 25' 36'; Belyi 27' 30' 31' 38'; Grigoriev 32'; Kiselev 39'			Stadium: SSA Luzhniki; Attendance: 4800; Referee: (Finland) Y.Filppu, (Latvia) E.Voitkovs

20.12.1998 EC1999 (q) (62)	Russia	7–0	Slovenia	Moscow
	Eremenko 10' 14' 18' 26' 36'; Alekberov 11'; Kiselev 16'			Stadium: SSA Luzhniki; Attendance: 6000; Referee: (Ukraine) O.Ivanov, (Finland) Y.Filppu

16 February 1999 Friendly (63)	Russia	4–5	Ukraine	Moscow
	Gorine 22'; Iachine 29'; Chugunov 33'; Abianov 37'		Koridze 9'; Mansurov 12'; Melnikov 27'; Kosenko 29'; Morgunov 36'	Stadium: USH CSKA; Attendance: 3000; Referee: (Russia) A.Selikov, (Russia) A.Shargaev

22 February 1999 EC 1999 (64)	Russia	3–3	Italy	Granada
	Gorine 13'; Eremenko 20' 36'		Caleca 35'; Quattrini 37'; Rubei 39'	Stadium: Palacio de Deportes; Referee: (Croatia) V.Pavich, (Belgium) P.Gauthier

23 February 1999 EC 1999 (65)	Russia	5–1	Belgium	Granada
	Belyi 18'; Agafonov 28'; Eremenko 38' 40'; Alekberov 40'		Gessner 26'	Stadium: Palacio de Deportes; Referee: (Italy) A.Lastruchi, (Croatia) V.Pavich

25 February 1999 EC 1999 (66)	Portugal	1–3	Russia	Granada
	Zezito 30'		Eremenko 9' 23'; Tkachuk 12'	Stadium: Palacio de Deportes; Referee: (Croatia) V.Pavich, (Spain) P.Galan

26 February 1999 EC 1999 (67)	Russia	9–6	Netherlands	Granada
	Gorine 3'; Eremenko 8' 36' 36' 39'; Markin 15' 22'; Alekberov 21'; Verizhnikov 25'		Grünholz 18' 34'; Langenhuijsen 19' 32' 38' 40'	Stadium: Palacio de Deportes; Referee: (Belgium) J.Tivold, (Spain) P.Galan

26 February 1999 EC 1999 (68)	Russia	3–3 pen. 4–2	Spain	Granada
	Belyi 27'; Alekberov 33'; Eremenko 34'		Llorente 7' 35'; Javi Sánchez 34'	Stadium: Palacio de Deportes; Attendance: 7500; Referee: (Italy) A.Lastruchi, (Netherlands) M.van der Bekerom
	Penalties
	Gorine (penalty scored); Verizhnikov (penalty scored); Alekberov (penalty scored); Eremenko (penalty scored)		(penalty scored) Ferreira; (penalty missed) Riquer; (penalty scored) Pato; (penalty missed) Joan

== National student team ==
6th World University Futsal Championship 1998 in Braga, Portugal

Win Draw Loss

20 September 1998 Group C	Russia	11–3	Angola	Braga

21 September 1998 Group C	Russia	15–1	Poland	Braga

22 September 1998 Group C	Russia	3–2	Spain	Braga

24 September 1998 1/4 final	Russia	4–0	Hungary	Braga

25 September 1998 1/2 final	Russia	6–1	Brazil	Braga

26 September 1998 Final	Russia	2–3 (a.e.t.)	Ukraine	Braga

== Intercontinental Futsal Cup ==
Win Draw Loss

14 October 1998	Dina Moscow (Russia)	6–5	(Brazil) Atlético Pax de Minas	Moscow
				Attendance: 5800

15 October 1998	Dina Moscow (Russia)	0–4	(Brazil) Atlético Pax de Minas	Moscow
				Attendance: 7000

16 October 1998	Dina Moscow (Russia)	3–4	(Brazil) Atlético Pax de Minas	Moscow
				Attendance: 7800

== Futsal European Clubs Championship ==
Win Draw Loss

4 May 1999 Group B	Dina Moscow (Russia)	6–2	(Croatia) Orkan Zagreb	Moscow
				Attendance: 4200

6 May 1999 Group B	Dina Moscow (Russia)	4–0	(Italy) Lazio Calcio a 5	Moscow
				Attendance: 4500

8 May 1999 1/2 final	Dina Moscow (Russia)	8–0	(Czech Republic) Mikeska Ostrava	Moscow
				Attendance: 6000

9 May 1999 Final	Dina Moscow (Russia)	2–1 (a.e.t.)	(Italy) Lazio Calcio a 5	Moscow
				Attendance: 7500

== Top League ==
7th Russian futsal championship 1998/1999

Pos	Team	Pld	W	D	L	GF	GA	GD	Pts	Qualification or relegation
1	(Moscow) Dina Moskva (C)	30	28	2	0	195	50	+145	86	
2	(Sverdlovsk Oblast) VIZ Yekaterinburg	30	23	2	5	124	62	+62	71	
3	Minkas Moscow (Note: Renamed to Spartak Moscow)	30	21	5	4	151	85	+66	68	
4	(Saint Petersburg) Zenit St. Petersburg (R)	30	18	5	7	117	59	+58	59	Disbanded after season
5	GKI-Gazprom Moscow	30	17	7	6	116	75	+41	58	
6	(Sverdlovsk Oblast) Alfa Yekaterinburg (Note: Replaced Uralmash-M before season)	30	16	0	14	96	112	−16	48	
7	(Khanty-Mansi Autonomous Okrug) TTG-Yava Yugorsk	30	12	9	9	85	76	+9	45	
8	(Sverdlovsk Oblast) Atrium-UPI Yekaterinburg (Note: Renamed to UPI-SUMZ Yekaterinburg)	30	12	3	15	85	115	−30	39	
9	CSKA Moscow	30	9	7	14	77	107	−30	34	
10	(Chelyabinsk Oblast) Fenix Chelyabinsk (Note: Renamed to Chelyabinets Chelyabinsk)	30	8	8	14	81	103	−22	32	
11	(Krasnoyarsk Krai) Zarya Yemelyanovo	30	10	1	19	64	111	−47	31	
12	(Krasnoyarsk Krai) Norilsk (Note: Renamed to Norilsk Nickel)	30	8	6	16	67	103	−36	30	
13	(Sverdlovsk Oblast) Stroitel Novouralsk (R)	30	7	5	18	59	111	−52	26	Qualification to Relegation tournament
14	(Saratov Oblast) Saratov-SPZ (O)	30	7	3	20	71	105	−34	24	Qualification to Relegation tournament
15	(Khanty-Mansi Autonomous Okrug) Koil Kogalym (R)	30	6	6	18	59	101	−42	24	Relegation to First League
16	(Nizhny Novgorod Oblast) Krona Nizhny Novgorod (R)	30	3	2	25	26	99	−73	11	Relegation to First League

Rules for classification: 1) points; 2) number of wins; 3) goal difference; 4) number of goals scored
(C) Champions; (O) Play-off winners; (R) Relegated

=== Promotion tournament ===
Pos	Team	Pld	W	D	L	GF	GA	GD	Pts	Promotion or relegation
1	(Saratov Oblast) Saratov-SPZ (P)	3	3	0	0	10	5	+5	9	Promotion to Top League
2	(Tatarstan) Privolzhanin Kazan (P)	3	2	0	1	10	5	+5	6	Promotion to Top League
3	(Sverdlovsk Oblast) Stroitel Novouralsk (R, P)	3	1	0	2	5	8	−3	3	Relegation to First League, but replaced Zenit in Top League
4	Chertanovo Moscow (R)	3	0	0	3	5	12	−7	0	Relegation to First League

Rules for classification: 1) points; 2) number of wins; 3) goal difference; 4) number of goals scored
(P) Promoted; (R) Relegated

== National Cup ==
=== Final Four ===
Semifinals
(Moscow) Dina Moskva	8
(Saint Petersburg) Zenit St. Petersburg	1
(Sverdlovsk Oblast) VIZ Yekaterinburg (pen.)	2(4)
Minkas Moscow	2(2)

Final
(Moscow) Dina Moskva	4
(Sverdlovsk Oblast) VIZ Yekaterinburg	0
Third place
(Saint Petersburg) Zenit St. Petersburg	7
Minkas Moscow	1

== First League. Division A ==
Pos	Team	Pld	W	D	L	GF	GA	GD	Pts	Qualification or relegation
1	(Kemerovo Oblast) Vita Kemerovo (P)	32	27	3	2	190	75	+115	84	Promotion to Top League
2	(Novosibirsk Oblast) Sibiryak Novosibirsk (P)	32	24	4	4	154	87	+67	76	Promotion to Top League
3	(Tatarstan) Privolzhanin Kazan (A)	32	23	4	5	159	81	+78	73	Qualification to Promotion tournament
4	Chertanovo Moscow (A)	32	21	5	6	146	72	+74	68	Qualification to Promotion tournament
5	Sportakademklub-AIF Moscow (R)	32	20	3	9	143	90	+53	63	Disbanded after season
6	(Krasnoyarsk Krai) Nika Lesosibirks	32	17	4	11	139	125	+14	55	
7	(Moscow Oblast) Spartak Shchyolkovo	32	15	7	10	126	85	+41	52	
8	(Dagestan) Anzhi-Motors Makhachkala	32	16	3	13	147	115	+32	51	
9	(Saratov Oblast) Olymp-VVUT Volsk	32	15	5	12	132	105	+27	50	
10	(Yakutia) Zarya Yakutsk	32	13	6	13	106	88	+18	45	
11	Spartak Moscow (R)	32	13	3	16	104	122	−18	42	Disbanded after season
12	(Kursk Oblast) Energetik Kurchatov	32	12	6	14	158	136	+22	42	
13	(Tomsk Oblast) Seversk (R)	32	11	4	17	109	141	−32	37	Relegation to First League. Division B
14	(Nizhny Novgorod Oblast) Kitezh Nizhny Novgorod (R)	32	6	1	25	68	141	−73	19	Relegation to First League. Division B
15	Petrovskyi Zamok Moscow (R)	32	3	0	29	81	285	−204	9	Relegation to First League. Division B
16	(Tatarstan) Diana Zelenodolsk (R)	32	3	0	29	49	145	−96	9	Withdraw after 4th tour
17	(Krasnoyarsk Krai) Zvezda Minusinsk (R)	32	1	2	29	57	161	−104	5	Withdraw after 5th tour

Rules for classification: 1) points; 2) number of wins; 3) goal difference; 4) number of goals scored
(A) Advance to a further round; (P) Promoted; (R) Relegated

== Women's League ==
7th Russian women futsal championship 1998/1999

Pos	Team	Pld	W	D	L	GF	GA	GD	Pts
1	(Volgograd Oblast) Lokomotiv Volgograd (C)	28	24	2	2	146	32	+114	74
2	(Saint Petersburg) Avrora St. Petersburg	28	24	2	2	151	24	+127	74
3	Chertanovo Moscow	28	18	4	6	82	39	+43	58
4	(Moscow Oblast) Snezhana Lyubertsy	28	12	4	12	95	57	+38	40
5	(Vladimir Oblast) Vlada Vladimir	28	9	1	18	45	69	−24	28
6	Nika Moscow	28	8	2	18	58	131	−73	26
7	(Saratov Oblast) Volzhanka Saratov	28	6	1	21	42	160	−118	19
8	(Nizhny Novgorod Oblast) Viktoria Nizhny Novgorod Region	28	1	0	27	22	126	−104	3

Source: championat.com
Rules for classification: 1) points; 2) number of wins; 3) goal difference; 4) number of goals scored
(C) Champions

== Women's National Cup ==
Semifinals
(Volgograd Oblast) Lokomotiv Volgograd	0
(Saint Petersburg) Avrora St. Petersburg	4
Chertanovo Moscow	2
(Moscow Oblast) Snezhana Lyubertsy	0

Final
(Saint Petersburg) Avrora St. Petersburg	2
Chertanovo Moscow	1
