= 2000–01 in Russian futsal =

== National team ==
Win Draw Loss

04.11.2000 Friendly (76)	Russia	5–0	Iran	Moscow
	Kupetskov 8'; Malyshev 11'; Markin 16'; Tkachuk 17'; Belyi 40'

05.11.2000 Friendly (77)	Russia	3–2	Ukraine	Moscow
	Malyshev 10'; Agafonov 15'; Alekberov 36'

19.11.2000 WC 2000 (78)	Russia	4–2	Croatia	Guatemala City
	Markin 24'; Eremenko 32'; Agaphonov 33'; Alekberov 40'	Report	Martić 35'; Derviščaušević 38'	Stadium: Teodoro Flores; Attendance: 2356; Referee: (Brazil) Camanho Sergio Ricardo

21.11.2000 WC 2000 (79)	Costa Rica	1–6	Russia	Guatemala City
	Carvajal 27'	Report	Tkachuk 3' 15'; Belyi 4'; Alekberov 6'; Eremenko 33'; Markin 39'	Stadium: Teodoro Flores; Attendance: 1923; Referee: (Hong Kong) Wong Po On Andy

23.11.2000 WC 2000 (80)	Russia	10–1	Australia	Guatemala City
	Alekberov 15'; Verizhnikov 15'; Chugunov 18' 40'; Eremenko 19'; Kupetskov 22'; Belyi 34'; Chtchoutchko 36' 40'; Tkachuk 37'	Report	Aitchison 1'	Stadium: Domo Polideportivo; Attendance: 7272; Referee: (Costa Rica) Alfaro Gallardo Alexander

26.11.2000 WC 2000 (81)	Russia	7–1	Argentina	Guatemala City
	Belyi 18'; Markin 28'; Verizhnikov 36' 38'; Malyshev 39'; Tkachuk 39'; Eremenko 39'	Report	Gonzalez 5'	Stadium: Domo Polideportivo; Attendance: 7285; Referee: (Croatia) Novak Ivan

27.11.2000 WC 2000 (82)	Egypt	6–4	Russia	Guatemala City
	Nader 2'; Arafa 4'; Samir 8'; Mahmoud 8' 36'; Sayed 38'	Report	Eremenko 6'; Agaphonov 19'; Alekberov 19'; Belyi 39'	Stadium: Domo Polideportivo; Attendance: 7350; Referee: (Hong Kong) Wong Po On Andy

29.11.2000 WC 2000 (83)	Brazil	6–2	Russia	Guatemala City
	Manoel Tobias 9' 9' 20'; Schumacher 12'; Anderson 17'; Joan 14'	Report	Alekberov 26'; Malyshev 27'	Stadium: Domo Polideportivo; Attendance: 7378; Referee: (Iran) Moosavi Sayed

01.12.2000 WC 2000 (84)	Spain	3–2	Russia	Guatemala City
	Paulo Roberto 15'; Daniel 23' 39'	Report	Verizhnikov 2' 38'	Stadium: Domo Polideportivo; Attendance: 7128; Referee: (Paraguay) Salinas Ramirez Francisco

03.12.2000 WC 2000 (85)	Russia	2–4	Portugal	Guatemala City
	Agaphonov 5'; Kupetskov 10'	Report	Vitinha 15'; Majó 27' 28'; Formiga 38'	Stadium: Domo Polideportivo; Attendance: 7568; Referee: (Spain) Galan Pedro

20.01.2001 Friendly (86)	Russia	6–1	Azerbaijan	Moscow
	Markin 10'; Solovev 14'; Belyi 20' 38'; Kupetskov 24'; Ionov 30'

21.01.2001 Friendly (87)	Russia	10–1	Azerbaijan	Moscow
	Chtchoutchko 5' 38' 40'; Ivanov 5' 18' 20'; Kupetskov 11'; Stroganov 21' 33' 37'

15.02.2001 Friendly (88)	Russia	1–0	Belarus	Moscow
	Moskalenko 28'

16.02.2001 Friendly (89)	Russia	2–1	Belarus	Moscow
	Ivanov 2'; Agaphonov 30'

22.02.2001 EC 2001 (90)	Russia	3–4	Italy	Moscow
	Sergej Ivanov 17'; Soloviev 37'; Belyi 39'		Caleca 7'; Foglia 16'; Rubei 33'; Franzoi 40'	Stadium: Luzhniki Palace of Sports; Attendance: 2500; Referee: (Croatia) Novak, (Finland) Filppu

23.02.2001 EC 2001 (91)	Russia	4–0	Netherlands	Moscow
	Alekberov 6' 37'; Belyi 8'; Eremenko 18'			Stadium: Luzhniki Palace of Sports; Attendance: 4000; Referee: (Portugal) Kardozo, (Spain) Galan

24.02.2001 EC 2001 (92)	Russia	4–2	Czech Republic	Moscow
	Markin 25'; Agafonov 27'; Belyi 40'; Alekberov 40'		Vrabec 9'; M. Mareš 18'	Stadium: Luzhniki Palace of Sports; Attendance: 6200; Referee: (Finland) Filppu, (Croatia) Novak

26.02.2001 EC 2001 (93)	Spain	2–1	Russia	Moscow
	Javi Rodríguez 12'; Daniel 35'		Belyi 39'	Stadium: Luzhniki Palace of Sports; Attendance: 6500; Referee: (Italy) A.Lastruchi, (Czech Republic) E.Ampler

28.02.2001 EC 2001 (94)	Russia	2–1 (a.e.t.)	Italy	Moscow
	Alekberov 7'; Sergej Ivanov 48'		Foglia 29'	Stadium: Luzhniki Palace of Sports; Attendance: 2400; Referee: (Spain) P. Galan, (Czech Republic) E.Ampler

== National student team ==
7th World University Futsal Championship 2000 in João Pessoa, Brazil

Win Draw Loss

6 August 2000 Group C	Russia	5–3	Argentina	João Pessoa

7 August 2000 Group C	Russia	8–0	Israel	João Pessoa

8 August 2000 Group C	Russia	0–0	Portugal	João Pessoa

10 August 2000 1/4 final	Russia	2–2 pen. 6–5	Spain	João Pessoa

11 August 2000 1/2 final	Russia	2–2 pen. 4–5	Brazil	João Pessoa

12 August 2000 3rd place	Russia	3–2	Portugal	João Pessoa

== Intercontinental Futsal Cup ==
Win Draw Loss

7 October 1999	Dina Moscow (Russia)	1–4	(Spain) Caja Segovia	Moscow
				Attendance: 4000

8 October 1999	Dina Moscow (Russia)	2–1	(Brazil) Sport Club Ulbra	Moscow
				Attendance: 4000

9 October 1999	Dina Moscow (Russia)	4–5	(Brazil) Atlético Pax de Minas	Moscow
				Attendance: 4000

== Futsal European Clubs Championship ==
Win Draw Loss

25 April 2000 Group B	Dina Moscow (Russia)	5–2	(Belgium) Charleroi	Castellón
				Attendance: 1000

26 April 2000 Group B	Dina Moscow (Russia)	2–1	(Portugal) Miramar	Castellón
				Attendance: 1000

28 April 2000 1/2 final	Dina Moscow (Russia)	3–2	(Italy) AS Genzano	Castellón
				Attendance: 2500

29 April 2000 Final	Playas de Castellón (Spain)	4–2	(Russia) Dina Moscow	Castellón
				Attendance: 5000

== Top League ==
=== Final standings ===
9th Russian futsal championship 2000/2001

Pos	Team	Pld	W	D	L	GF	GA	GD	Pts	Qualification or relegation
1	(Moscow) Spartak Moskva (C)	30	25	3	2	111	44	+67	78	
2	(Krasnoyarsk Krai) Norilsk Nickel	30	21	6	3	114	58	+56	69	
3	(Khanty-Mansi Autonomous Okrug) TTG-Yava Yugorsk	30	21	5	4	100	46	+54	68	
4	(Moscow) Dina Moskva	30	20	6	4	133	68	+65	66	
5	(Sverdlovsk Oblast) VIZ Yekaterinburg	30	19	6	5	110	65	+45	63	
6	GKI-Gazprom Moscow	30	19	2	9	107	71	+36	59	
7	(Sverdlovsk Oblast) UPI-SUMZ Yekaterinburg	30	15	3	12	85	80	+5	48	
8	CSKA Moscow	30	13	8	9	87	77	+10	47	
9	(Sverdlovsk Oblast) Alfa Yekaterinburg	30	13	6	11	81	62	+19	45	
10	(Saint Petersburg) Politech St. Petersburg	30	9	8	13	71	77	−6	35	
11	(Tatarstan) Privolzhanin Kazan	30	8	3	19	58	92	−34	27	
12	(Saint Petersburg) Edinstvo St. Petersburg	30	5	6	19	58	78	−20	21	
13	(Saratov Oblast) Saratov-SPZ (O)	30	5	4	21	53	94	−41	19	Qualification to Relegation tournament
14	(Krasnoyarsk Krai) Zarya Yemelyanovo (R)	30	5	4	21	56	106	−50	19	Qualification to Relegation tournament
15	(Novosibirsk Oblast) Sibiryak-Sibakademstroy Novosibirsk (R)	30	3	4	23	43	119	−76	13	Relegation to First League
16	(Chelyabinsk Oblast) Chelyabinets Chelyabinsk (R)	30	2	0	28	43	171	−128	6	Relegation to First League

Rules for classification: 1) points; 2) number of wins; 3) goal difference; 4) number of goals scored.
(C) Champions; (O) Play-off winners; (R) Relegated

=== Promotion tournament ===
Pos	Team	Pld	W	D	L	GF	GA	GD	Pts	Promotion or relegation
1	(Saratov Oblast) Saratov-SPZ (P)	3	3	0	0	11	4	+7	9	Promotion to Top League
2	(Nizhny Novgorod Oblast) Krona-Rosavto Nizhny Novgorod (P)	3	2	0	1	8	3	+5	6	Promotion to Top League
3	(Krasnoyarsk Krai) Zarya Yemelyanovo (R)	3	1	0	2	3	7	−4	3	Relegation to First League
4	(Khanty-Mansi Autonomous Okrug) Koil Kogalym (R)	3	0	0	3	4	12	−8	0	Relegation to First League

Rules for classification: 1) points; 2) number of wins; 3) goal difference; 4) number of goals scored.
(P) Promoted; (R) Relegated

== National Cup ==
=== Final Four ===
Semifinals
GKI-Gazprom Moscow	3
(Khanty-Mansi Autonomous Okrug) TTG-Yava Yugorsk	2
(Krasnoyarsk Krai) Norilsk Nickel	3
(Sverdlovsk Oblast) Alfa Yekaterinburg	2

Final
GKI-Gazprom Moscow (a.e.t.)	3
(Krasnoyarsk Krai) Norilsk Nickel	2
Third place
(Khanty-Mansi Autonomous Okrug) TTG-Yava Yugorsk	2
(Sverdlovsk Oblast) Alfa Yekaterinburg	6

== First League. Division A ==
Pos	Team	Pld	W	D	L	GF	GA	GD	Pts	Promotion or relegation
1	(Tyumen Oblast) Sibhefteprovod Tyumen (P)	32	24	5	3	139	57	+82	77	Promotion to Top League
2	Inteko Moscow (P)	32	23	6	3	168	68	+100	75	Promotion to Top League
3	(Khanty-Mansi Autonomous Okrug) Koil Kogalym (A)	32	21	2	9	114	64	+50	65	Qualification to Promotion tournament
4	(Nizhny Novgorod Oblast) Krona-Rosavto Nizhny Novgorod (O, A)	32	19	8	5	121	82	+39	65	Qualification to Promotion tournament
5	(Moscow Oblast) Spartak Shchyolkovo	32	20	3	9	110	68	+42	63	
6	(Khanty-Mansi Autonomous Okrug) Fakel Surgut	32	17	7	8	130	94	+36	58	
7	(Sverdlovsk Oblast) Stroitel Novouralsk	32	14	9	9	73	73	0	51	
8	MGSU-Polygran Moscow	32	15	5	12	99	81	+18	50	
9	(Yakutia) Zarya Yakutsk	32	12	9	11	88	74	+14	45	
10	(Yamalo-Nenets Autonomous Okrug) Rospan-Itera Novy Urengoy	32	11	11	10	115	95	+20	44	
11	(Kurgan Oblast) Rusich Kurgan	32	11	8	13	98	111	−13	41	
12	(Krasnoyarsk Krai) Norilsk Nickel-d	32	11	7	14	90	89	+1	40	
13	(Dagestan) Kaspiy Makhachkala	32	11	6	15	101	99	+2	39	
14	(Kamchatka Krai) Kamchatka Petropavlovsk-Kamchatsky (R)	32	6	2	24	69	144	−75	20	Relegation to First League. Division B
15	(Krasnoyarsk Krai) Atom Zheleznogorsk	32	5	3	24	59	173	−114	18	Relegation to First League. Division B
16	(Krasnoyarsk Krai) Nika Lesosibirks (R)	32	5	2	25	39	68	−29	17	Withdraw after 5th tour
17	(Irkutsk Oblast) Sibiryak Bratsk (R)	32	0	1	31	50	233	−183	1	Relegation to First League. Division B

Rules for classification: 1) points; 2) number of wins; 3) goal difference; 4) number of goals scored.
(A) Advance to a further round; (O) Play-off winners; (P) Promoted; (R) Relegated

== First League. Division B ==
=== Final stage ===
Pos	Team	Pld	W	D	L	GF	GA	GD	Pts	Promotion
1	(Irkutsk Oblast) Zvezda Irkutsk (P)	4	3	1	0	37	17	+20	10	Promotion to First League. Division A
2	(Khanty-Mansi Autonomous Okrug) Neftyanik Surgut (P)	4	3	1	0	28	14	+14	10	Promotion to First League. Division A
3	(Irkutsk Oblast) Tandem Ust-Kut	4	2	0	2	21	15	+6	6	
4	(Irkutsk Oblast) Angara Angarsk	4	1	0	3	19	32	−13	3	
5	(Tyumen Oblast) Neftegaz Tyumen	4	0	0	4	6	33	−27	0	

Rules for classification: 1) points; 2) number of wins; 3) goal difference; 4) number of goals scored.
(P) Promoted

== Women's League ==
9th Russian women futsal championship 2000/2001

Pos	Team	Pld	W	D	L	GF	GA	GD	Pts
1	(Volgograd Oblast) Lokomotiv Volgograd (C)	20	16	2	2	87	32	+55	50
2	(Moscow Oblast) Snezhana Lyubertsy	20	12	4	4	69	62	+7	40
3	(Saint Petersburg) Avrora St. Petersburg	20	11	4	5	50	42	+8	37
4	(Saint Petersburg) Neva St. Petersburg	20	4	2	14	49	61	−12	14
5	Spartak Moscow	20	1	0	19	17	81	−64	3

Rules for classification: 1) points; 2) number of wins; 3) goal difference; 4) number of goals scored.
(C) Champions

== Women's National Cup ==
Final
(Saint Petersburg) Avrora St. Petersburg	2
(Volgograd Oblast) Lokomotiv Volgograd	1
