= 1999–2000 in Russian futsal =

== National team ==
Win Draw Loss

10 December 1999 Friendly (69)	Russia	6–3	Georgia	Moscow
	Kupetskov 3' 32'; Eremenko 14'; Malyshev 16' 36'; Alekberov 40'		Dzabiradze 13'; Sologashvili 14'; Zoidze 36'	Stadium: USH CSKA; Referee: (Russia) A.Averyanov, (Russia) V.Protasov

11 December 1999 Friendly (70)	Russia	2–0	Yugoslavia	Moscow
	Grigoriev 13'; Belyi 17'			Stadium: USH CSKA; Referee: (Russia) Y.Bogomolov, (Russia) S.Kadykov

12 December 1999 Friendly (71)	Russia	5–1	Ukraine	Moscow
	Eremenko 7' 38'; Alekberov 15' 37'; Verizhnikov 18'		Koridze 10'	Stadium: USH CSKA; Attendance: 3500; Referee: (Russia) A.Selikov, (Russia) B.Berezkin

13 January 2000 WC 2000 (Q) (72)	Russia	3–0	Latvia	Zabrze
	Gorine 12'; Belyi 16'; Eremenko 36'			Stadium: Sport Palace; Attendance: 1500; Referee: (Croatia) Novak, (Finland) Y.Fillpu

14 January 2000 WC 2000 (Q) (73)	Russia	10–0	North Macedonia	Zabrze
	Eremenko 6' 12'; Alekberov 14' 32'; Gorine 21'; Tkachuk 25'; Verizhnikov 27' 39'; Markin 28'; Chugunov 32'			Stadium: Sport Palace; Attendance: 1500; Referee: (Slovakia) Badura, (Spain) Torres Ernandes

16 January 2000 WC 2000 (Q) (74)	Russia	1–0	Belgium	Zabrze
	Kupetskov 9'			Stadium: Sport Palace; Attendance: 1500; Referee: (Spain) Galan Pedro, (Spain) Torres Ernandes

17 January 2000 WC 2000 (Q) (75)	Poland	1–2	Russia	Zabrze
	Kukhchak 29'		Markin 14'; Alekberov 34'	Stadium: Sport Palace; Attendance: 1500; Referee: (Spain) Galan Pedro, (Spain) Esteban Torres

== Intercontinental Futsal Cup ==
Win Draw Loss

7 October 1999	Dina Moscow (Russia)	4–4 pen. 3–5	(Brazil) Sport Club Ulbra	Moscow
				Attendance: 5000

8 October 1999	Dina Moscow (Russia)	2–3	(Brazil) Sport Club Ulbra	Moscow
				Attendance: 7000

9 October 1999	Dina Moscow (Russia)	4–3	(Brazil) Sport Club Ulbra	Moscow
				Attendance: 8000

== Futsal European Clubs Championship ==
Win Draw Loss

27 April 2000 Group	Dina Moscow (Russia)	4–0	(Croatia) Glama Brig Zagreb	Segovia
		Report

28 April 2000 Group	Sporting CP (Portugal)	1–4	(Russia) Dina Moscow	Segovia
		Report

30 April 2000 1/2 final	Dina Moscow (Russia)	1–2 (a.e.t.)	(Italy) BNL Calcetto Roma	Segovia
		Report

1 May 2000 3rd place	Dina Moscow (Russia)	6–3	(Croatia) Glama Brig Zagreb	Segovia
		Report

== Top League ==
8th Russian futsal championship 1999/2000

Pos	Team	Pld	W	D	L	GF	GA	GD	Pts	Qualification or relegation
1	(Moscow) Dina Moskva (C)	28	23	3	2	128	44	+84	72	
2	(Moscow) Spartak Moskva	28	20	5	3	113	54	+59	65	
3	GKI-Gazprom Moscow	28	21	1	6	105	63	+42	64	
4	(Sverdlovsk Oblast) VIZ Yekaterinburg	28	20	3	5	107	67	+40	63	
5	(Krasnoyarsk Krai) Norilsk Nickel	28	19	5	4	121	65	+56	62	
6	(Khanty-Mansi Autonomous Okrug) TTG-Yava Yugorsk	28	13	3	12	89	80	+9	42	
7	(Saratov Oblast) Saratov-SPZ	28	10	8	10	83	80	+3	38	
8	(Novosibirsk Oblast) Sibiryak Novosibirsk	28	10	4	14	72	110	−38	34	
9	(Sverdlovsk Oblast) UPI-SUMZ Yekaterinburg	28	9	3	16	72	90	−18	30	
10	(Sverdlovsk Oblast) Alfa Yekaterinburg	28	8	5	15	78	112	−34	29	
11	CSKA Moscow	28	6	7	15	84	94	−10	25	
12	(Chelyabinsk Oblast) Chelyabinets Chelyabinsk	28	7	2	19	73	119	−46	23	
13	(Tatarstan) Privolzhanin Kazan (O)	28	4	7	17	59	106	−47	19	Qualification to Relegation tournament
14	(Krasnoyarsk Krai) Zarya Yemelyanovo (O)	28	4	5	19	68	111	−43	17	Qualification to Relegation tournament
15	(Sverdlovsk Oblast) Stroitel Novouralsk (R)	28	4	3	21	54	111	−57	15	Relegation to First League
16	(Kemerovo Oblast) Vita Kemerovo (R)	11	2	2	7	28	53	−25	8	Withdraw after 3rd tour

Rules for classification: 1) points; 2) number of wins; 3) goal difference; 4) number of goals scored.
(C) Champions; (O) Play-off winners; (R) Relegated

=== Promotion tournament ===
Pos	Team	Pld	W	D	L	GF	GA	GD	Pts	Promotion or relegation
1	(Tatarstan) Privolzhanin Kazan (P)	3	2	0	1	9	6	+3	6	Promotion to Top League
2	(Krasnoyarsk Krai) Zarya Yemelyanovo (P)	3	1	2	0	11	9	+2	5	Promotion to Top League
3	Dynamo Moscow (R)	3	1	1	1	6	7	−1	4	Relegation to First League
4	(Khanty-Mansi Autonomous Okrug) Koil Kogalym (R)	3	0	1	2	5	9	−4	1	Relegation to First League

Rules for classification: 1) points; 2) number of wins; 3) goal difference; 4) number of goals scored.
(P) Promoted; (R) Relegated

== National Cup ==
=== Final Four ===
Semifinals
(Moscow) Dina Moskva	4
(Sverdlovsk Oblast) VIZ Yekaterinburg	3
Spartak-Minkas Moscow	4
(Krasnoyarsk Krai) Norilsk Nickel	0

Final
(Moscow) Dina Moskva	2
Spartak-Minkas Moscow	1
Third place
(Sverdlovsk Oblast) VIZ Yekaterinburg (a.e.t.)	5
(Krasnoyarsk Krai) Norilsk Nickel	4

== First League. Division A ==
Pos	Team	Pld	W	D	L	GF	GA	GD	Pts	Promotion or relegation
1	(Saint Petersburg) Stroyimpuls St. Petersburg (P)	38	33	2	3	157	63	+94	101	Promotion to Top League
2	(Saint Petersburg) Politech St. Petersburg (P)	38	31	4	3	129	42	+87	97	Promotion to Top League
3	(Khanty-Mansi Autonomous Okrug) Koil Kogalym (A)	38	27	4	7	116	54	+62	85	Qualification to Promotion tournament
4	Dynamo Moscow (R, A)	38	26	7	5	154	67	+87	85	Qualification to Promotion tournament
5	(Tyumen Oblast) Sibhefteprovod Tyumen	38	25	6	7	144	80	+64	81	
6	(Krasnoyarsk Krai) Nika Lesosibirks	38	23	5	10	134	89	+45	74	
7	(Moscow Oblast) Spartak Shchyolkovo	38	22	8	8	142	99	+43	74	
8	(Nizhny Novgorod Oblast) Krona Nizhny Novgorod	38	20	4	14	133	102	+31	64	
9	(Yakutia) Zarya Yakutsk	38	17	7	14	130	104	+26	58	
10	(Khanty-Mansi Autonomous Okrug) Fakel Surgut	38	16	6	16	120	108	+12	54	
11	Inteko Moscow	38	14	5	19	132	126	+6	47	
12	(Saratov Oblast) Olymp-VVUT Volsk	38	12	9	17	110	131	−21	45	
13	(Tula Oblast) Tulskoe pivo (R)	38	12	6	20	91	123	−32	42	Disbanded after season
14	(Kurgan Oblast) Zaurale Kurgan	38	10	10	18	112	131	−19	40	
15	(Dagestan) Kaspiy Makhachkala	38	9	5	24	109	158	−49	32	
16	(Samara Oblast) Tolyatti	38	8	6	24	115	194	−79	30	
17	(Kursk Oblast) Energetik Kurchatov (R)	38	7	4	27	75	134	−59	25	Withdraw after 5th tour
18	(Irkutsk Oblast) Bratsk (O)	38	7	3	28	108	195	−87	24	Qualification to Relegation tournament
19	(Kamchatka Krai) Kamchatka Petropavlovsk-Kamchatsky (O)	38	6	4	28	84	164	−80	22	Qualification to Relegation tournament
20	Chertanovo Moscow (R)	38	1	1	36	48	180	−132	4	Relegation to First League. Division B

Rules for classification: 1) points; 2) number of wins; 3) goal difference; 4) number of goals scored.
(A) Advance to a further round; (O) Play-off winners; (P) Promoted; (R) Relegated

== First League. Division B ==
=== Final stage ===
Pos	Team	Pld	W	D	L	GF	GA	GD	Pts	Promotion or qualification
1	(Yamalo-Nenets Autonomous Okrug) Dynamo Novy Urengoy (Note: Team renamed to Rospan-Itera Novy Urengoy) (P)	5	5	0	0	30	12	+18	15	Promotion to First League. Division A
2	MGSU-Polygran Moscow (P)	5	4	0	1	25	15	+10	12	Promotion to First League. Division A
3	(Krasnoyarsk Krai) Norilsk (Note: Team renamed to Norilsk Nikel-d) (O, A)	5	3	0	2	17	14	+3	9	Qualification to Promotion tournament First League
4	(Krasnoyarsk Krai) Atom Zheleznogorsk (O, A)	5	2	0	3	25	24	+1	6	Qualification to Promotion tournament First League
5	(Saratov Oblast) Fortuna Rtishchevo	5	1	0	4	19	26	−7	3	
6	(Moscow Oblast) Avangard Solnechnogorsk	5	0	0	5	10	25	−15	0	

Rules for classification: 1) points; 2) number of wins; 3) goal difference; 4) number of goals scored.
(A) Advance to a further round; (O) Play-off winners; (P) Promoted

== Women's League ==
8th Russian women futsal championship 1999/2000

Pos	Team	Pld	W	D	L	GF	GA	GD	Pts
1	(Volgograd Oblast) Lokomotiv Volgograd (C)	28	26	1	1	159	29	+130	79
2	(Saint Petersburg) Avrora St. Petersburg	28	25	0	3	127	28	+99	75
3	(Moscow Oblast) Snezhana Lyubertsy	28	17	3	8	106	54	+52	54
4	Chertanovo Moscow	28	14	2	12	77	67	+10	44
5	Nika Moscow	28	7	2	19	52	111	−59	23
6	(Vladimir Oblast) SK RVSN-Sinko Vladimir	28	6	2	20	37	124	−87	20
7	(Vladimir Oblast) Vlada Vladimir	28	4	4	20	41	97	−56	16
8	(Saratov Oblast) Volzhanka Saratov	28	4	2	22	49	138	−89	14

Source: championat.com
Rules for classification: 1) points; 2) number of wins; 3) goal difference; 4) number of goals scored.
(C) Champions

== Women's National Cup ==
Semifinals
(Volgograd Oblast) Lokomotiv Volgograd	7
Tyoplyi Stan Moscow	0
(Saint Petersburg) Avrora St. Petersburg (a.e.t.)	4
(Moscow Oblast) Snezhana Lyubertsy	3

Final
(Volgograd Oblast) Lokomotiv Volgograd (a.e.t.)	1
(Saint Petersburg) Avrora St. Petersburg	0
