= 1996–97 in Russian futsal =

== National team ==
Win Draw Loss

7 October 1996 Friendly (38)	Belgium	3–3	Russia	Tongerlo
			Eremenko

8 October 1996 Friendly (39)	Netherlands	5–1	Russia	Venray
			Koshcheev

9 October 1996 Friendly (40)	Netherlands	1–5	Russia	Horst
			Eremenko; Alekberov; Yaichnikov

9 November 1996 Friendly (41)	Russia	9–1	Belarus	Saint Petersburg
			Eremenko; Alekberov; Panko; Tkachuk; Ouskov

25 November 1996 WC 1996 (42)	Russia	2–2	Netherlands	Murcia
	Alekberov 21'; Eremenko 39'	Report	Edwin Grunholz 27'; Johannes Ludwig 30'	Stadium: Palacio de Deportes de Murcia; Attendance: 1000; Referee: Haji Yaakubo (Malaysia)

27 November 1996 WC 1996 (43)	Argentina	2–2	Russia	Murcia
	Sanchez 15'; Pacheco 18'	Report	Verizhnikov 12'; Kisselev 14'	Stadium: Palacio de Deportes de Murcia; Attendance: 1000; Referee: F.Larranaga (Spain)

28 November 1996 WC 1996 (44)	Russia	11–1	China	Murcia
	Kisselev 6'; Eremenko 12' 19' 27'; Belyi 13'; Ouskov 23'; Gorine 29'; Verizhnikov 30' 32' 40'; Alekberov 37'	Report	Shen 6'	Stadium: Palacio de Deportes de Murcia; Attendance: 500; Referee: D.Sall (Senegal)

1 December 1996 WC 1996 (45)	Spain	2–0	Russia	Castellón de la Plana
	Lorente 9'; Pato 28'	Report		Stadium: Pabellon de Castellon; Attendance: 2500; Referee: Z.Li (China)

2 December 1996 WC 1996 (46)	Russia	3–0	Italy	Castellón de la Plana
	Eremenko 29' 39'; Iachine 36'	Report		Stadium: Pabellon de Castellon; Attendance: 1500; Referee: M.van den Bekerom (Netherlands)

4 December 1996 WC 1996 (47)	Russia	6–2	Belgium	Castellón de la Plana
	Iachine 10'; Verizhnikov 20'; Belyi 29'; Eremenko 34'; Alekberov 37'; Kisselev 39'	Report	Hechtermans 14'; Cocco 39'	Stadium: Pabellon de Castellon; Attendance: 2000; Referee: S.Moosavi (Iran)

6 December 1996 WC 1996 (48)	Brazil	6–2	Russia	Barcelona
	Chôco 10' 14' 40'; Márcio 26' 29'; Manoel Tobias 39'	Report	Eremenko 35'; Belyi 36'	Stadium: Palau Sant Jordi; Attendance: 8300; Referee: A.Herzog (Czech Republic)

8 December 1996 WC 1996 (49)	Russia	3–2	Ukraine	Barcelona
	Belyi 10' 36'; Alekberov 24'	Report	Iouri Oussakovskii 10'; Taras Voniarkha 35'	Stadium: Palau Sant Jordi; Attendance: 15500; Referee: P.Galan (Spain)

13 June 1997 Friendly (50)	Spain	6–2	Russia	Almelo
			Kupetskov; Safronov

14 June 1997 Friendly (51)	Belgium	0–2	Russia	Almelo
			Tkachuk; Safronov

== National student team ==
5th World University Futsal Championship 1996 in Jyväskylä, Finland

Win Draw Loss

11 August 1996 Group B	Russia	14–2	Poland	Jyväskylä

12 August 1996 Group B	Russia	7–2	Croatia	Jyväskylä

13 August 1996 Group B	Russia	4–1	Portugal	Jyväskylä

15 August 1996 1/4 final	Russia	7–1	Finland	Jyväskylä

16 August 1996 1/2 final	Russia	3–2	Ukraine	Jyväskylä

17 August 1996 Final	Russia	5–6	Brazil	Jyväskylä

== Futsal European Clubs Championship ==
Win Draw Loss

5 May 1997 Group A	Dina Moscow (Russia)	7–1	(Czech Republic) DFC Prague	Moscow

6 May 1997 Group A	Dina Moscow (Russia)	6–2	(Italy) BNL Calcetto Roma	Moscow

8 May 1997 1/2 final	Dina Moscow (Russia)	9–4	(Ukraine) Lokomotiv Odesa	Moscow

9 May 1997 Final	Dina Moscow (Russia)	2–2 pen. 7–6	(Italy) BNL Calcetto Roma	Moscow

== Top League ==
5th Russian futsal championship 1996/1997

Pos	Team	Pld	W	D	L	GF	GA	GD	Pts	Qualification or relegation
1	(Moscow) Dina Moskva (C)	29	26	2	1	172	58	+114	80	
2	KSM-24 Moscow	29	22	1	6	163	102	+61	67	
3	(Khanty-Mansi Autonomous Okrug) TTG Yugorsk	29	20	3	6	119	78	+41	63	
4	(Saint Petersburg) Zenit St. Petersburg	29	20	2	7	153	87	+66	62	
5	(Sverdlovsk Oblast) VIZ Yekaterinburg	29	18	4	7	124	89	+35	58	
6	(Chelyabinsk Oblast) Fenix-Lokomotiv Chelyabinsk	29	16	0	13	123	113	+10	48	
7	(Sverdlovsk Oblast) Uralmash-M Yekaterinburg	29	14	5	10	106	99	+7	47	
8	(Chelyabinsk Oblast) Stroitel-7 Chelyabinsk	29	13	4	12	110	88	+22	43	
9	Minkas Moscow	29	13	2	14	108	109	−1	41	
10	(Sverdlovsk Oblast) Atrium-UPI Yekaterinburg	29	9	5	15	122	146	−24	32	
11	(Sverdlovsk Oblast) Stroitel Novouralsk	29	8	6	15	95	128	−33	30	
12	Chertanovo Moscow	29	9	2	18	97	144	−47	29	
13	(Krasnoyarsk Krai) Norilsk (R)	29	4	5	20	89	129	−40	17	Qualification to Relegation tournament
14	(Novosibirsk Oblast) Sibiryak Novosibirsk (O)	29	4	4	21	77	137	−60	16	Qualification to Relegation tournament
15	(Saint Petersburg) PSI St. Petersburg (R)	29	3	3	23	55	166	−111	12	Withdraw after 6th tour
16	(Yakutia) Sakhainkas Yakutsk (R)	15	0	2	13	36	85	−49	2	Withdraw after 4th tour

Rules for classification: 1) points; 2) number of wins; 3) goal difference; 4) number of goals scored.
(C) Champions; (O) Play-off winners; (R) Relegated

=== Promotion tournament ===
Pos	Team	Pld	W	D	L	GF	GA	GD	Pts	Promotion or relegation
1	(Novosibirsk Oblast) Sibiryak Novosibirsk (P)	3	2	0	1	18	15	+3	6	Promotion to Top League
2	(Nizhny Novgorod Oblast) Krona Nizhny Novgorod (P)	3	1	1	1	7	7	0	4	Promotion to Top League
3	(Krasnoyarsk Krai) Zarya Yemelyanovo (R)	3	1	1	1	10	11	−1	4	Relegation to First League
4	(Krasnoyarsk Krai) Norilsk (R)	3	1	0	2	11	13	−2	3	Relegation to First League

Rules for classification: 1) points; 2) number of wins; 3) goal difference; 4) number of goals scored.
(P) Promoted; (R) Relegated

== National Cup ==
=== Final Four ===
Semifinals
(Khanty-Mansi Autonomous Okrug) TTG Yugorsk (a.e.t.)	1
(Chelyabinsk Oblast) Stroitel-7 Chelyabinsk	0
(Moscow) Dina Moskva (a.e.t.)	4
KSM-24 Moscow	3

Final
(Khanty-Mansi Autonomous Okrug) TTG Yugorsk	4
(Moscow) Dina Moskva (a.e.t.)	5
Third place
(Chelyabinsk Oblast) Stroitel-7 Chelyabinsk	5
KSM-24 Moscow	3

== Top League Cup ==
=== Final Four ===
Semifinals
KSM-24 Moscow	5
Minkas Moscow	5
(Khanty-Mansi Autonomous Okrug) TTG Yugorsk	0
(Moscow) Dina Moskva	6

Final
KSM-24 Moscow (a.e.t.)	4
(Moscow) Dina Moskva	3
Third place
Minkas Moscow	0
(Khanty-Mansi Autonomous Okrug) TTG Yugorsk	4

== First League. Division A ==
1tst union Russian second level futsal division 1996/1997

Pos	Team	Pld	W	D	L	GF	GA	GD	Pts	Promotion or relegation
1	(Samara Oblast) Prima Samara (P)	26	20	1	5	130	59	+71	61	Promotion to Top League
2	(Saratov Oblast) Roma Saratov (P)	26	18	3	5	90	52	+38	57	Promotion to Top League
3	(Krasnoyarsk Krai) Zarya Yemelyanovo (A)	26	16	5	5	123	68	+55	53	Qualification to Promotion tournament
4	(Nizhny Novgorod Oblast) Krona Nizhny Novgorod (A)	28	16	5	7	121	68	+53	53	Qualification to Promotion tournament
5	MKZ Torpedo Moscow (R)	26	16	4	6	123	83	+40	52	Disbanded after season
6	(Moscow Oblast) MCHS-Titan Reutov (R)	26	15	2	9	125	104	+21	47	Disbanded after season
7	(Novgorod Oblast) Zarya Novgorod	26	12	8	6	99	74	+25	44	
8	Bolear-MGAFK Moscow	26	11	3	12	101	91	+10	36	
9	(Khanty-Mansi Autonomous Okrug) Neftyanik Surgut	26	11	2	13	80	111	−31	35	
10	(Kursk Oblast) Energetik Kurchatov	26	7	4	15	80	121	−41	25	
11	(Saint Petersburg) Shchit St. Petersburg	26	4	7	15	62	90	−28	19	
12	(Sverdlovsk Oblast) UPI-2 Yekaterinburg (R)	26	3	6	17	81	144	−63	15	Disbanded after season
13	(Tomsk Oblast) Seversk	26	3	3	20	67	137	−70	12	
14	(Tatarstan) Diana Zelenodolsk	26	3	1	22	72	152	−80	10	
-	(Rostov Oblast) LEHG Rostov-on-Don (R)	14	1	0	13	6	20	−14	3	Withdraw after 1st tour
-	(Yakutia) Universitet Yakutsk (R)	0	0	0	0	0	0	0	0	Withdraw before season

Rules for classification: 1) points; 2) number of wins; 3) goal difference; 4) number of goals scored.
(A) Advance to a further round; (P) Promoted; (R) Relegated

== First League. Division B ==
=== Second stage ===
==== Group 1 ====
Games played in Mihnevo and Nizhnekamsk. One game between Sport-Express and MFK Spartak (SK Perovo) played in Moscow.

Pos	Team	Pld	W	D	L	GF	GA	GD	Pts	Qualification
1	(Tatarstan) Shinnik Nizhnekamsk (A)	10	7	2	1	45	28	+17	23	Qualification to Final stage
2	(Krasnoyarsk Krai) Nika Lesosibirks (A)	10	6	2	2	60	38	+22	20	Qualification to Final stage
3	Sport-Express Moscow (A)	10	6	0	4	57	48	+9	18	Qualification to Final stage
4	(Voronezh Oblast) Voronezh	10	4	2	4	57	55	+2	14	
5	Perovo Moscow	10	2	1	7	44	48	−4	7	
6	(Samara Oblast) Lada-Impuls Tolyatti	10	1	1	8	17	63	−46	4	

Rules for classification: 1) points; 2) number of wins; 3) goal difference; 4) number of goals scored.
(A) Advance to a further round

=== Final stage ===
KrAZ Krasnoyarsk withdraw before the final tournament, Voronezh would like to replace them, but sometimes later they withdraw too.

Pos	Team	Pld	W	D	L	GF	GA	GD	Pts	Promotion or qualification
1	(Khanty-Mansi Autonomous Okrug) Koil Kogalym (P)	7	6	0	1	33	16	+17	18	Promotion to First League Division A
2	Sport-Express Moscow (P)	7	3	1	3	25	28	−3	10	Promotion to First League Division A
3	(Krasnoyarsk Krai) Nika Lesosibirks (A)	7	3	1	3	23	23	0	10	Qualification to Promotion tournament First League Division A
4	(Tatarstan) Shinnik Nizhnekamsk (A)	7	3	0	4	27	16	+11	9	Qualification to Promotion tournament First League Division A
5	(Saratov Oblast) VVUT Volsk	4	0	0	4	12	37	−25	0	Withdraw after 1st tour

Rules for classification: 1) points; 2) number of wins; 3) goal difference; 4) number of goals scored.
(A) Advance to a further round; (P) Promoted

== Women's League ==
5th Russian women futsal championship 1996/1997

Rank	Team
1	(Moscow Oblast) Snezhana Lyubertsy (C)
2	(Saint Petersburg) Avrora St. Petersburg
3	(Moscow Oblast) Nadezhda Voskresensk
4	(Volgograd Oblast) Kontur-Yunior Volgograd
5	(Nizhny Novgorod Oblast) Viktoria Nizhny Novgorod Region
6	(Saratov Oblast) Volzhanka Saratov
7	(Vladimir Oblast) Vlada Vladimir

== Women's National Cup ==
Rank	Round Robin
1	(Saint Petersburg) Avrora St. Petersburg
