= 1995–96 in Russian futsal =

== National team ==
Win Draw Loss

11 August 1995 Friendly (18)	Slovakia	5–6	Russia	Nové Mesto nad Váhom
			Iachine; Koscheev; Linnikov; Kisselev

12 August 1995 Friendly (19)	Slovakia	4–4	Russia	Nové Mesto nad Váhom
			Kisselev; Iachine; Koscheev

13 September 1995 Friendly (20)	Russia	7–5	Ukraine	Mikhnyovo
			Alekberov; Koscheev; Linnikov; Iachine; Eremenko; Verizhnikov

14 September 1995 Friendly (21)	Russia	6–0	Ukraine	Mikhnyovo
			Verizhnikov; Eremenko; Zakerov; Melnikov; Iachine; Kisselev

3 October 1995 Friendly (22)	Netherlands	2–4	Russia	Hoorn
			Eremenko; Iachine

4 October 1995 Friendly (23)	Netherlands	2–4	Russia	Grootebroek
			Verizhnikov; Eremenko

6 October 1995 Friendly (24)	Hungary	5–11	Russia	Fehérgyarmat
			Eremenko; Verizhnikov; Zakerov; Iachine; Kisselev

7 October 1995 Friendly (25)	Hungary	3–7	Russia	Vásárosnamény
			Eremenko; Koscheev; Verizhnikov; Alekberov

23 October 1995 EC1996 (q) (26)	Belgium	5–6	Russia	Deurne
			Eremenko; Koscheev; Iachine; Kisselev

24 October 1995 EC1996 (q) (27)	Russia	8–1	Belarus	Ghent
	Eremenko; Gorine; Verizhnikov; Alekberov

25 October 1995 EC1996 (q) (28)	Russia	31–0	Moldova	Pepinster
	Eremenko; Verizhnikov; Iachine; Linnikov; Alekberov; Gorine; Belyi; Zakerov; Kisselev

29 October 1995 EC1996 (q) (29)	Russia	7–3	Slovenia	Charleroi
	Gorine; Eremenko; Iachine; Kisselev

12 December 1995 Friendly (30)	Spain	3–2	Russia	Palencia
			Koscheev 27'; Alekberov 33'

8 January 1996 EC1996 (31)	Russia	3–2	Ukraine	Córdoba
	Gorine 13'; Eremenko 15'; Alekberov 35'

10 January 1996 EC1996 (32)	Russia	5–1	Italy	Córdoba
	Eremenko 14' 18' 20'; Kisselev 16'; Belyi 40'

12 January 1996 EC1996 (33)	Russia	6–2	Belgium	Córdoba
	Gorine 1'; Kisselev 14' 28'; Alekberov 16'; Eremenko 31' 38'

14 January 1996 EC1996 (34)	Spain	5–3	Russia	Córdoba
			Kisselev 20'; Eremenko 22' 32'

14 May 1996 Friendly (35)	Russia	2–2	Slovenia	Genk
	Panko; Yaichnikov

15 May 1996 Friendly (36)	Belgium	2–2	Russia	Genk
			Iachine; Kisselev

16 May 1996 Friendly (37)	Russia	6–4	Hungary	Genk
	Iachine; Yeryomin; Grigoriev; Panko

== Futsal European Clubs Championship ==
Win Draw Loss

30 April 1996 Group B	Dina Moscow (Russia)	4–1	(Croatia) Uspinjača	Rome

1 May 1996 Group B	Dina Moscow (Russia)	2–3	(Spain) Pinturas Lepanto Zaragoza	Rome

3 May 1996 3rd place	Dina Moscow (Russia)	11–0	(Belgium) ZVK Sint-Truiden	Rome

== Top League ==
4th Russian futsal championship 1995/1996

Pos	Team	Pld	W	D	L	GF	GA	GD	Pts	Qualification or relegation
1	(Moscow) Dina Moskva (C)	28	27	0	1	177	52	+125	81	
2	KSM-24 Moscow	28	19	4	5	130	65	+65	61	
3	(Khanty-Mansi Autonomous Okrug) TTG Yugorsk	28	17	4	7	96	70	+26	55	
4	Minkas Moscow	28	17	2	9	109	90	+19	53	
5	(Sverdlovsk Oblast) VIZ Yekaterinburg	28	14	6	8	97	83	+14	48	
6	(Saint Petersburg) PSI St. Petersburg	28	11	2	15	81	93	−12	35	
7	(Sverdlovsk Oblast) Uralmash-M Yekaterinburg	28	10	5	13	91	103	−12	35	
8	(Chelyabinsk Oblast) Fenix-Lokomotiv Chelyabinsk	28	10	4	14	92	113	−21	34	
9	(Chelyabinsk Oblast) Stroitel-7 Chelyabinsk	28	7	11	10	84	92	−8	32	
10	(Novosibirsk Oblast) Sibiryak Novosibirsk	28	9	3	16	97	124	−27	30	
11	(Sverdlovsk Oblast) Stroitel Novouralsk	28	8	6	14	86	126	−40	30	
12	(Sverdlovsk Oblast) Atrium-UPI Yekaterinburg	28	8	4	16	78	110	−32	28	
13	(Saint Petersburg) Zenit St. Petersburg (O)	28	7	7	14	81	92	−11	28	Qualification to Relegation tournament
14	Chertanovo Moscow (O)	28	6	7	15	54	91	−37	25	Qualification to Relegation tournament
15	MKZ Torpedo Moscow (R)	28	5	5	18	66	115	−49	20	Relegation to First League
-	Spartak-Novorus Moscow (R)	10	0	1	9	23	57	−34	1	Withdraw after 2nd tour

Source: dina.ru
Rules for classification: 1) points; 2) number of wins; 3) goal difference; 4) number of goals scored.
(C) Champions; (O) Play-off winners; (R) Relegated

=== Promotion tournament ===
Pos	Team	Pld	W	D	L	GF	GA	GD	Pts	Promotion or relegation
1	(Saint Petersburg) Zenit St. Petersburg (P)	3	2	0	1	15	10	+5	6	Promotion to Top League
2	Chertanovo Moscow (P)	3	2	0	1	10	9	+1	6	Promotion to Top League
3	(Nizhny Novgorod Oblast) Chaika Nizhny Novgorod (R)	3	1	0	2	12	11	+1	3	Relegation to First League
4	(Saratov Oblast) SPZ-Roma Saratov (R)	3	1	0	2	8	15	−7	3	Relegation to First League

Rules for classification: 1) points; 2) number of wins; 3) goal difference; 4) number of goals scored.
(P) Promoted; (R) Relegated

== National Cup ==
=== Final Four ===
Semifinals
Spartak-Novorus Moscow	5
MKZ Torpedo Moscow	4
(Moscow) Dina Moskva	8
(Khanty-Mansi Autonomous Okrug) TTG Yugorsk	2

Final
Spartak-Novorus Moscow	4
(Moscow) Dina Moskva	7
Third place
MKZ Torpedo Moscow	3
(Khanty-Mansi Autonomous Okrug) TTG Yugorsk	6

== Top League Cup ==
=== Final Four ===
Semifinals
(Moscow) Dina Moskva	4
(Chelyabinsk Oblast) Fenix-Lokomotiv Chelyabinsk	7
(Sverdlovsk Oblast) VIZ Yekaterinburg	1(10)
KSM-24 Moscow (pen.)	1(11)

Final
(Chelyabinsk Oblast) Fenix-Lokomotiv Chelyabinsk	6
KSM-24 Moscow (a.e.t.)	5
Third place
(Moscow) Dina Moskva	4
(Sverdlovsk Oblast) VIZ Yekaterinburg	2

== First League ==
=== First stage ===
==== Group A ====
Pos	Team	Pld	W	D	L	GF	GA	GD	Pts	Qualification
1	Krasnyj Oktyabr Moscow (A)	15	13	1	1	72	35	+37	40	Qualification to Second stage
2	(Yakutia) Universitet Yakutsk (A)	15	10	3	2	77	32	+45	33	Qualification to Second stage
3	(Arkhangelsk Oblast) Gadvikbank Arkhangelsk	15	7	2	6	53	46	+7	23	
4	(Tatarstan) Diana Zelenodolsk	14	3	2	9	45	58	−13	11	Start with 2nd tour
5	(Smolensk Oblast) Torpedo Roslavl	15	3	1	11	49	100	−51	10	
6	(Tatarstan) Shinnik Nizhnekamsk	14	2	3	9	32	57	−25	9	Start with 2nd tour

Rules for classification: 1) points; 2) number of wins; 3) goal difference; 4) number of goals scored.
(A) Advance to a further round

==== Group B ====
Pos	Team	Pld	W	D	L	GF	GA	GD	Pts	Qualification
1	(Nizhny Novgorod Oblast) Chaika Nizhny Novgorod (A)	15	11	1	3	67	39	+28	34	Qualification to Second stage
2	(Krasnoyarsk Krai) Norilsk (A)	15	10	3	2	70	25	+45	33	Qualification to Second stage
3	(Nizhny Novgorod Oblast) Krona Nizhny Novgorod	15	10	1	4	78	31	+47	31	
4	(Moscow Oblast) Shchyolkovo	15	5	2	8	39	58	−19	17	
5	TAF Moscow	15	3	3	9	43	66	−23	12	
6	(Samara Oblast) Lada-Impuls Tolyatti	15	1	0	14	35	114	−79	3	

Rules for classification: 1) points; 2) number of wins; 3) goal difference; 4) number of goals scored.
(A) Advance to a further round

==== Group C ====
Pos	Team	Pld	W	D	L	GF	GA	GD	Pts	Qualification
1	(Yakutia) Rosinkas Yakutsk (A)	13	12	0	1	77	37	+40	36	Qualification to Second stage
2	(Saratov Oblast) SPZ-Roma Saratov (A)	13	8	1	4	57	33	+24	25	Qualification to Second stage
3	(Saratov Oblast) Olymp-VVUT Volsk	13	7	2	4	49	41	+8	23	
4	(Samara Oblast) Lada-SKA Tolyatti	13	5	1	7	44	44	0	16	
5	(Chuvashia) Standart Cheboksary	13	1	0	12	28	82	−54	3	
6	(Tatarstan) Lada-NMHZ Mendeleevsk (R)	5	0	0	5	13	31	−18	0	Withdraw after 1st tour

Rules for classification: 1) points; 2) number of wins; 3) goal difference; 4) number of goals scored.
(A) Advance to a further round; (R) Relegated

==== Group D ====
Pos	Team	Pld	W	D	L	GF	GA	GD	Pts	Qualification
1	(Novgorod Oblast) Zarya Novgorod (A)	15	14	0	1	92	27	+65	42	Qualification to Second stage
2	(Saint Petersburg) Ehllada St. Petersburg (A)	15	10	0	5	65	58	+7	30	Qualification to Second stage
3	(Kursk Oblast) Energetik Kurchatov	15	9	0	6	70	57	+13	27	
4	(Voronezh Oblast) Voronezh	15	6	1	8	55	59	−4	19	
5	(Komi Republic) Severgazprom Ukhta	15	3	1	11	39	80	−41	10	
6	(Rostov Oblast) Burevestnik Rostov-on-Don	15	1	2	12	35	85	−50	5	

Rules for classification: 1) points; 2) number of wins; 3) goal difference; 4) number of goals scored.
(A) Advance to a further round

==== Group E ====
Pos	Team	Pld	W	D	L	GF	GA	GD	Pts	Qualification
1	(Sverdlovsk Oblast) UPI-2 Yekaterinburg (A)	15	14	0	1	80	50	+30	42	Qualification to Second stage
2	(Chelyabinsk Oblast) Polyus Zlatoust (A)	15	9	1	5	52	42	+10	28	Qualification to Second stage
3	(Sverdlovsk Oblast) Korus Yekaterinburg	15	8	1	6	77	84	−7	25	
4	(Khanty-Mansi Autonomous Okrug) Neftyanik Surgut	15	8	0	7	72	61	+11	24	
5	(Orenburg Oblast) Strela Orenburg (R)	15	6	1	8	59	64	−5	19	Withdraw after 2nd tour
6	(Omsk Oblast) Energetik Omsk	15	2	1	12	64	103	−39	7	

Rules for classification: 1) points; 2) number of wins; 3) goal difference; 4) number of goals scored.
(A) Advance to a further round; (R) Relegated

==== Group F ====
Pos	Team	Pld	W	D	L	GF	GA	GD	Pts	Qualification
1	(Krasnoyarsk Krai) Zarya Yemelyanovo (A)	15	12	3	0	114	43	+71	39	Qualification to Second stage
2	(Krasnoyarsk Krai) Spartak-Atom Zheleznogorsk (A)	15	8	3	4	78	67	+11	27	Qualification to Second stage
3	(Tomsk Oblast) Yupiter Seversk	15	8	2	5	90	72	+18	26	
4	(Krasnoyarsk Krai) Metallurg Krasnoyarsk	15	5	3	7	54	69	−15	18	
5	(Krasnoyarsk Krai) Zvezda Minusinsk	15	5	2	8	61	79	−18	17	
6	(Krasnoyarsk Krai) Stroitel Norilsk	15	0	1	14	32	99	−67	1	

Rules for classification: 1) points; 2) number of wins; 3) goal difference; 4) number of goals scored.
(A) Advance to a further round

=== Second stage ===
==== Group G ====
Pos	Team	Pld	W	D	L	GF	GA	GD	Pts	Qualification
1	(Krasnoyarsk Krai) Norilsk (A)	10	7	3	0	77	37	+40	24	Qualification to Final stage
2	(Yakutia) Rosinkas Yakutsk (A)	10	5	2	3	36	21	+15	17	Qualification to Final stage
3	(Sverdlovsk Oblast) UPI-2 Yekaterinburg (A)	10	4	3	3	34	31	+3	15	Qualification to Final stage
4	Krasnyj Oktyabr Moscow	10	4	2	4	31	39	−8	14	
5	(Saint Petersburg) Bars St. Petersburg	10	3	1	6	38	52	−14	10	
6	(Krasnoyarsk Krai) Spartak-Atom Zheleznogorsk	10	1	1	8	18	53	−35	4	

Rules for classification: 1) points; 2) number of wins; 3) goal difference; 4) number of goals scored.
(A) Advance to a further round

==== Group Н ====
Pos	Team	Pld	W	D	L	GF	GA	GD	Pts	Qualification
1	(Saratov Oblast) SPZ-Roma Saratov (A)	10	5	4	1	38	31	+7	19	Qualification to Final stage
2	(Nizhny Novgorod Oblast) Chaika Nizhny Novgorod (A)	10	6	0	4	37	32	+5	18	Qualification to Final stage
3	(Krasnoyarsk Krai) Zarya Yemelyanovo (A)	10	5	1	4	39	29	+10	16	Qualification to Final stage
4	(Nizhny Novgorod Oblast) Krona Nizhny Novgorod	10	4	2	4	25	29	−4	14	
5	(Novgorod Oblast) Zarya Novgorod	10	3	4	3	23	27	−4	13	
6	(Yakutia) Universitet Yakutsk	10	0	3	7	17	31	−14	3	

Rules for classification: 1) points; 2) number of wins; 3) goal difference; 4) number of goals scored.
(A) Advance to a further round

=== Final stage ===
Pos	Team	Pld	W	D	L	GF	GA	GD	Pts	Promotion or qualification
1	(Krasnoyarsk Krai) Norilsk (P)	10	6	2	2	38	29	+9	20	Promotion to Top League
2	(Yakutia) Rosinkas Yakutsk (P)	10	5	3	2	28	26	+2	18	Promotion to Top League
3	(Nizhny Novgorod Oblast) Chaika Nizhny Novgorod (A)	10	4	2	4	42	32	+10	14	Qualification to Promotion tournament
4	(Saratov Oblast) SPZ-Roma Saratov (A)	10	3	4	3	28	27	+1	13	Qualification to Promotion tournament
5	(Krasnoyarsk Krai) Zarya Yemelyanovo	10	2	6	2	27	29	−2	12	
6	(Sverdlovsk Oblast) UPI-2 Yekaterinburg	10	1	1	8	28	48	−20	4	

Rules for classification: 1) points; 2) number of wins; 3) goal difference; 4) number of goals scored.
(A) Advance to a further round; (P) Promoted

== Women's League ==
4th Russian women futsal championship 1995/1996

Rank	Team
1	(Moscow Oblast) Snezhana Lyubertsy (C)
2	(Volgograd Oblast) Kontur-Yunior Volgograd
3	(Saint Petersburg) Avrora St. Petersburg
4	(Moscow Oblast) Sport-Istok Fryazino
5	(Moscow Oblast) Nadezhda Voskresensk
6	(Nizhny Novgorod Oblast) Viktoria Nizhny Novgorod Region
7	(Saint Petersburg) Baltika St. Petersburg
8	(Moscow Oblast) Orlenok Krasnoarmeysk
9	(Saratov Oblast) Volzhanka Saratov
10	(Vladimir Oblast) Vlada Vladimir
11	MGU Moscow
12	(Moscow Oblast) Gloria Khimki

== Women's National Cup ==
Final
(Saint Petersburg) Avrora St. Petersburg	2
(Saint Petersburg) Baltika St. Petersburg	0
