= 1997–98 in Russian futsal =

== National team ==
Win Draw Loss

| 16 November 1997 Friendly (52) | Brazil | 7–2 | Russia | Recife |
| | Vander Carioca; Márcio; Andre | | Iachine; Gorine |

| 18 November 1997 Friendly (53) | Brazil | 4–2 | Russia | João Pessoa |
| | Vinisius; Sandrinho; Lenizinho | | Gorine; Iachine |

| 20 November 1997 Friendly (54) | Brazil | 5–3 | Russia | Campina Grande |
| | | | Fadeev; Gorine |

| 27 February 1998 Friendly (55) | Poland | 4–5 | Russia | Legnica |
| | | | Gorine; Iachine; Fadeev; Baranov |

| 28 February 1998 Friendly (56) | Poland | 2–5 | Russia | Wałbrzych |
| | | | Fadeev; Kupetskov; Tkachuk |

== Intercontinental Futsal Cup ==
Win Draw Loss

| 7 October 1997 | Dina Moscow (Russia) | 0–0 pen. 5–4 | (Brazil) Inter/Ulbra | Moscow |
| | | | | Attendance: 5000 |

| 8 October 1998 | Dina Moscow (Russia) | 3–2 | (Brazil) Inter/Ulbra | Moscow |
| | | | | Attendance: 6500 |

| 9 October 1998 | Dina Moscow (Russia) | 4–2 | (Brazil) Inter/Ulbra | Moscow |
| | | | | Attendance: 7150 |

== Futsal European Clubs Championship ==
Win Draw Loss

| 7 April 1998 Group B | Dina Moscow (Russia) | 7–0 | (Belgium) ZVK Ford Genk | Talavera de la Reina |

| 9 April 1998 Group B | Dina Moscow (Russia) | 8–5 | (Croatia) Split 1700 | Talavera de la Reina |

| 11 April 1998 1/2 final | Dina Moscow (Russia) | 4–2 | (Italy) Gruppo Sportivo BNL | Talavera de la Reina |

| 12 April 1998 Final | CLM Talavera (Spain) | 3–3 pen. 5–4 | (Russia) Dina Moscow | Talavera de la Reina |

== Top League ==
6th Russian futsal championship 1997/1998

| Pos | Team | Pld | W | D | L | GF | GA | GD | Pts | Qualification or relegation |
|---|---|---|---|---|---|---|---|---|---|---|
| 1 | (Moscow) Dina Moskva (C) | 30 | 29 | 1 | 0 | 205 | 50 | +155 | 88 | |
| 2 | (Sverdlovsk Oblast) VIZ Yekaterinburg | 30 | 23 | 3 | 4 | 154 | 80 | +74 | 72 | |
| 3 | GKI-KSM Moscow | 30 | 21 | 5 | 4 | 131 | 78 | +53 | 68 | |
| 4 | (Khanty-Mansi Autonomous Okrug) TTG-Yava Yugorsk | 30 | 19 | 7 | 4 | 116 | 69 | +47 | 64 | |
| 5 | (Saint Petersburg) Zenit St. Petersburg | 30 | 16 | 9 | 5 | 133 | 77 | +56 | 57 | |
| 6 | (Sverdlovsk Oblast) Uralmash-M Yekaterinburg (R) | 30 | 13 | 7 | 10 | 97 | 80 | +17 | 46 | Disbanded after season |
| 7 | Minkas Moscow | 30 | 12 | 6 | 12 | 97 | 97 | 0 | 42 | |
| 8 | (Sverdlovsk Oblast) Atrium-UPI Yekaterinburg | 30 | 12 | 4 | 14 | 112 | 105 | +7 | 40 | |
| 9 | (Chelyabinsk Oblast) Fenix-Lokomotiv Chelyabinsk | 30 | 12 | 4 | 14 | 96 | 115 | −19 | 40 | |
| 10 | (Chelyabinsk Oblast) Chelyabinets Chelyabinsk (R) | 30 | 11 | 6 | 13 | 79 | 83 | −4 | 39 | Merged with Fenix-Lokomotiv Chelyabinsk |
| 11 | (Saratov Oblast) SPZ-Roma Saratov (Note: Renamed to SPZ-Saratov) | 30 | 7 | 8 | 15 | 91 | 89 | +2 | 29 | |
| 12 | (Nizhny Novgorod Oblast) Krona Nizhny Novgorod | 30 | 8 | 2 | 20 | 65 | 121 | −56 | 26 | |
| 13 | (Sverdlovsk Oblast) Stroitel Novouralsk (O) | 30 | 7 | 2 | 21 | 81 | 132 | −51 | 23 | Qualification to Relegation tournament |
| 14 | (Samara Oblast) Prima Samara (R) | 30 | 6 | 5 | 19 | 70 | 129 | −59 | 23 | Qualification to Relegation tournament |
| 15 | (Novosibirsk Oblast) Sibiryak Novosibirsk (R) | 30 | 4 | 1 | 25 | 68 | 172 | −104 | 13 | Relegation to First League |
| 16 | Chertanovo Moscow (R) | 30 | 4 | 1 | 25 | 73 | 191 | −118 | 13 | Relegation to First League |

Rules for classification: 1) points; 2) number of wins; 3) goal difference; 4) number of goals scored.
(C) Champions; (O) Play-off winners; (R) Relegated

=== Promotion tournament ===
| Pos | Team | Pld | W | D | L | GF | GA | GD | Pts | Promotion or relegation |
|---|---|---|---|---|---|---|---|---|---|---|
| 1 | (Krasnoyarsk Krai) Norilsk (P) | 3 | 2 | 0 | 1 | 13 | 7 | +6 | 6 | Promotion to Top League |
| 2 | (Sverdlovsk Oblast) Stroitel Novouralsk (P) | 3 | 2 | 0 | 1 | 9 | 9 | 0 | 6 | Promotion to Top League |
| 3 | (Khanty-Mansi Autonomous Okrug) Koil Kogalym (R, P) | 3 | 1 | 0 | 2 | 5 | 7 | −2 | 3 | Relegation to First League, but replaced Chelyabinets in Top League |
| 4 | (Samara Oblast) Prima Samara (R) | 3 | 1 | 0 | 2 | 6 | 10 | −4 | 3 | Relegation to First League |

Rules for classification: 1) points; 2) number of wins; 3) goal difference; 4) number of goals scored.
(P) Promoted; (R) Relegated

== National Cup ==
=== Final Four ===
Semifinals
(Khanty-Mansi Autonomous Okrug) TTG Yugorsk | 2
GKI-KSM Moscow | 3
(Moscow) Dina Moskva | 4
(Saint Petersburg) Zenit St. Petersburg | 1

Final
GKI-KSM Moscow | 2
(Moscow) Dina Moskva | 5
Third place
(Khanty-Mansi Autonomous Okrug) TTG Yugorsk | 8
(Saint Petersburg) Zenit St. Petersburg | 5

== Top League Cup ==
6th Russian futsal Top League Cup

| 6 May 1998 | (Sverdlovsk Oblast) VIZ Yekaterinburg | 2–2 pen. 4–3 | (Moscow) Dina Moskva | Yekaterinburg |

| 7 May 1998 | (Sverdlovsk Oblast) VIZ Yekaterinburg | 7–7 pen. 7–8 | (Moscow) Dina Moskva | Yekaterinburg |

| 8 May 1998 | (Sverdlovsk Oblast) VIZ Yekaterinburg | 3–2 | (Moscow) Dina Moskva | Yekaterinburg |

== First League. Division A ==
| Pos | Team | Pld | W | D | L | GF | GA | GD | Pts | Promotion or qualification |
|---|---|---|---|---|---|---|---|---|---|---|
| 1 | (Krasnoyarsk Krai) Zarya Yemelyanovo (P) | 26 | 21 | 4 | 1 | 126 | 59 | +67 | 67 | Promotion to Top League |
| 2 | CSKA-Bolear Moscow (P) | 26 | 20 | 6 | 0 | 126 | 53 | +73 | 66 | Promotion to Top League |
| 3 | (Khanty-Mansi Autonomous Okrug) Koil Kogalym (A) | 26 | 18 | 4 | 4 | 94 | 63 | +31 | 58 | Qualification to Promotion tournament |
| 4 | (Krasnoyarsk Krai) Norilsk (A) | 26 | 16 | 1 | 9 | 106 | 74 | +32 | 49 | Qualification to Promotion tournament |
| 5 | Spartak-AIF Moscow (Note: Renamed to Sportakademklub-AIF) | 26 | 12 | 5 | 9 | 99 | 74 | +25 | 41 | |
| 6 | (Kemerovo Oblast) Vita Kemerovo | 26 | 10 | 4 | 12 | 88 | 114 | −26 | 34 | |
| 7 | (Khanty-Mansi Autonomous Okrug) Neftyanik Surgut (R) | 26 | 9 | 5 | 12 | 84 | 84 | 0 | 32 | Disbanded after season |
| 8 | (Yakutia) Zarya Yakutsk | 26 | 9 | 4 | 13 | 74 | 101 | −27 | 31 | |
| 9 | (Tatarstan) Shinnik Nizhnekamsk (R) | 26 | 8 | 5 | 13 | 79 | 88 | −9 | 29 | Disbanded after season |
| 10 | (Kursk Oblast) Energetik Kurchatov | 26 | 8 | 3 | 15 | 93 | 109 | −16 | 27 | |
| 11 | (Tatarstan) Diana Zelenodolsk | 26 | 8 | 3 | 15 | 67 | 126 | −59 | 27 | |
| 12 | (Tatarstan) Privolzhanin Kazan | 26 | 7 | 4 | 15 | 84 | 103 | −19 | 25 | |
| 13 | (Krasnoyarsk Krai) Nika Lesosibirks | 26 | 7 | 2 | 17 | 86 | 105 | −19 | 23 | |
| 14 | (Tomsk Oblast) Seversk | 26 | 2 | 4 | 20 | 58 | 121 | −63 | 10 | |
| - | Sport-Express Moscow (R) | 5 | 3 | 0 | 2 | 0 | 0 | 0 | 9 | Withdraw after 1st tour |
| - | (Novgorod Oblast) Zarya Novgorod (R) | 5 | 1 | 0 | 4 | 0 | 0 | 0 | 3 | Withdraw after 1st tour |
| - | (Saint Petersburg) Shchit-PARNAS-A St. Petersburg (R) | 0 | 0 | 0 | 0 | 0 | 0 | 0 | 0 | Withdraw before season |

Rules for classification: 1) points; 2) number of wins; 3) goal difference; 4) number of goals scored.
(A) Advance to a further round; (P) Promoted; (R) Relegated

=== First League Cup ===
Matches played at SKK «Oktuabrsky», Kemerovo from 28 April to 3 May 1998

| Pos | Team | Pld | W | D | L | GF | GA | GD | Pts |
|---|---|---|---|---|---|---|---|---|---|
| 1 | (Krasnoyarsk Krai) Zarya Yemelyanovo (C) | 5 | 5 | 0 | 0 | 26 | 14 | +12 | 15 |
| 2 | (Kemerovo Oblast) Vita Kemerovo | 5 | 3 | 1 | 1 | 27 | 21 | +6 | 10 |
| 3 | (Yakutia) Zarya Yakutsk | 5 | 2 | 1 | 2 | 18 | 18 | 0 | 7 |
| 4 | Spartak-AIF Moscow | 5 | 1 | 2 | 2 | 25 | 31 | −6 | 5 |
| 5 | (Krasnoyarsk Krai) Nika Lesosibirks | 5 | 1 | 1 | 3 | 21 | 22 | −1 | 4 |
| 6 | (Tomsk Oblast) Seversk | 5 | 0 | 1 | 4 | 15 | 26 | −11 | 1 |

Rules for classification: 1) points; 2) number of wins; 3) goal difference; 4) number of goals scored.
(C) Champions

== Women's League ==
6th Russian women futsal championship 1997/1998

| Rank | Team |
|---|---|
| 1 | (Volgograd Oblast) Lokomotiv Volgograd (C) |
| 2 | (Saint Petersburg) Avrora St. Petersburg |
| 3 | (Moscow Oblast) Snezhana Lyubertsy |
| 4 | Chertanovo Moscow |
| 5 | (Vladimir Oblast) Vlada Vladimir |
| 6 | (Nizhny Novgorod Oblast) Viktoria Nizhny Novgorod Region |
| 7 | (Saratov Oblast) Volzhanka Saratov |

== Women's National Cup ==
| Final |
| (Moscow Oblast) Snezhana Lyubertsy | 5 |
| Chertanovo Moscow | 3 |
