= 1991–92 in Russian futsal =

== National team ==
Win Draw Loss

24 April 1991 Friendly (1)	Soviet Union	6–2	Hungary	Agrigento
	Verizhnikov; Baboshkin; Eremenko; Semyonov

25 April 1991 Friendly (2)	Italy	4–5	Soviet Union	Agrigento
			Eremenko; Verizhnikov; Baboshkin

10 October 1991 Friendly (3)	Soviet Union	8–0	Belgium	Ancona
	Gladilin; Eremenko; Semyonov; Kochtchoug

11 October 1991 Friendly (4)	Italy	0–0 pen. 4–5	Soviet Union	Ancona

19 March 1992 Friendly (5)	CIS	4–1	Latvia	Moscow
	Tchoukhlov

21 March 1992 Friendly (6)	CIS	8–3	Slovakia	Moscow
	Eremenko; Maslakov; Semyonov; Solodovnik

22 March 1992 Friendly (7)	CIS	6–5	Italy	Moscow
	Eremenko; Stepanov

21 April 1992 WC 1992 (q) (8)	CIS	7–7	Poland	Burjassot
	Eremenko; Efremov; Stepanov; Semyonov; Tchoukhlov; Zakerov

23 April 1992 WC 1992 (q) (9)	Spain	5–3	CIS	Riba-Roja
			Eremenko; Tchoukhlov

25 April 1992 WC 1992 (q) (10)	CIS	5–2	Czechoslovakia	Riba-Roja
	Stepanov; Zakerov; Eremenko; Solodovnik; Maslakov

26 April 1992 WC 1992 (q) (11)	CIS	4–4	Hungary	Burjassot
	Eremenko; Maslakov; Tchoukhlov

== Futsal European Clubs Championship ==
Win Draw Loss

25 June 1991 Group B	KSM-24 Moscow (Soviet Union)	4–6	(Hungary) Magyars Muzhi	Madrid

26 June 1991 Group B	KSM-24 Moscow (Soviet Union)	5–6	(Spain) Interviú Lloyd's	Madrid

29 June 1991 5th place	KSM-24 Moscow (Soviet Union)	10–2	(Italy) Roma RCB	Madrid

== USSR Championship ==
=== Preliminary round ===
==== Group 1-A ====
Pos	Team	Pld	W	D	L	GF	GA	GD	Pts	AGR	SKF	SME	MET
1	(Moldavian Soviet Socialist Republic) Agros-Intex Chișinău (H)	3	2	1	0	8	3	+5	5	—	3–3	2–0	3–0
2	(Latvian Soviet Socialist Republic) SKIF-Forum Riga	3	2	1	0	8	4	+4	5	3–3	—	2–1	3–0
3	(Russian Soviet Federative Socialist Republic) Smena Vorkuta	3	1	0	2	4	4	0	2	0–2	1–2	—	3–0
4	(Russian Soviet Federative Socialist Republic) Metallurg Sverdlovsk	3	0	0	3	0	9	−9	0	0–3	0–3	0–3	—

(H) Hosts

==== Group 1-B ====
Pos	Team	Pld	W	D	L	GF	GA	GD	Pts	NEF	ELE	PAG
1	(Azerbaijan Soviet Socialist Republic) Heftchi Baku	2	2	0	0	11	4	+7	4	—	4–0	7–4
2	(Ukrainian Soviet Socialist Republic) MGP Elektron Lvov	2	1	0	1	2	4	−2	2	0–4	—	2–0
3	(Byelorussian Soviet Socialist Republic) Pagonya Minsk	2	0	0	2	4	9	−5	0	4–7	0–2	—

==== Group 1-Final ====
Pos	Team	Pld	W	D	L	GF	GA	GD	Pts	AGR	SKF	NEF	ELE
1	(Moldavian Soviet Socialist Republic) Agros-Intex Chișinău (H)	3	2	1	0	10	6	+4	5	—	3–3	5–2	2–1
2	(Latvian Soviet Socialist Republic) SKIF-Forum Riga	3	2	1	0	13	11	+2	5	3–3	—	5–4	5–4
3	(Azerbaijan Soviet Socialist Republic) Heftchi Baku	3	1	0	2	10	10	0	2	2–5	4–5	—	4–0
4	(Ukrainian Soviet Socialist Republic) MGP Elektron Lvov	3	0	0	3	5	11	−6	0	1–2	4–5	0–4	—

(H) Hosts

==== Group 2-A ====
Pos	Team	Pld	W	D	L	GF	GA	GD	Pts	KSM	MKH	SIB	MCO
1	(Russian Soviet Federative Socialist Republic) KSM-24 Moscow	3	2	1	0	24	5	+19	5	—	4–4	5–1	15–0
2	(Ukrainian Soviet Socialist Republic) Mekhanizator Dnepropetrovsk (H)	3	2	1	0	11	7	+4	5	4–4	—	2–1	5–2
3	(Russian Soviet Federative Socialist Republic) Sibiryak Novosibirsk	3	1	0	2	6	8	−2	2	1–5	1–2	—	4–1
4	(Tajik Soviet Socialist Republic) MCOP Dushanbe	3	0	0	3	3	24	−21	0	0–15	2–5	1–4	—

(H) Hosts

==== Group 2-B ====
Pos	Team	Pld	W	D	L	GF	GA	GD	Pts	VAL	KHI	EKO	FLA
1	(Moldavian Soviet Socialist Republic) Valeologia Chișinău	3	2	1	0	8	5	+3	5	—	4–2	2–2	2–1
2	(Uzbek Soviet Socialist Republic) Khimik Olmaliq	3	2	0	1	14	9	+5	4	2–4	—	7–3	5–2
3	(Byelorussian Soviet Socialist Republic) Ekonomist Minsk	3	1	1	1	15	13	+2	3	2–2	3–7	—	10–4
4	(Azerbaijan Soviet Socialist Republic) Flamengo Baku	3	0	0	3	7	17	−10	0	1–2	2–5	4–10	—

==== Group 2-Final ====
Pos	Team	Pld	W	D	L	GF	GA	GD	Pts	KSM	MKH	VAL	KHI
1	(Russian Soviet Federative Socialist Republic) KSM-24 Moscow	3	2	1	0	17	7	+10	5	—	4–4	3–1	10–2
2	(Ukrainian Soviet Socialist Republic) Mekhanizator Dnepropetrovsk (H)	3	2	1	0	8	4	+4	5	4–4	—	1–0	3–0
3	(Moldavian Soviet Socialist Republic) Valeologia Chișinău	3	1	0	2	5	6	−1	2	1–3	0–1	—	4–2
4	(Uzbek Soviet Socialist Republic) Khimik Olmaliq	3	0	0	3	4	17	−13	0	2–10	0–3	2–4	—

(H) Hosts

Pos	Team	Pld	W	D	L	GF	GA	GD	Pts	SIB	EKO	FLA	MCO
5	(Russian Soviet Federative Socialist Republic) Sibiryak Novosibirsk	3	2	1	0	17	8	+9	5	—	9–3	4–4	4–1
6	(Byelorussian Soviet Socialist Republic) Ekonomist Minsk	3	2	0	1	19	14	+5	4	3–9	—	10–4	6–1
7	(Azerbaijan Soviet Socialist Republic) Flamengo Baku	3	1	1	1	14	17	−3	3	4–4	4–10	—	6–3
8	(Tajik Soviet Socialist Republic) MCOP Dushanbe	3	0	0	3	5	16	−11	0	1–4	1–6	3–6	—

==== Group 3-Final ====
(Russian Soviet Federative Socialist Republic) Edelveis Rostov-on-Don
(Russian Soviet Federative Socialist Republic) Metallurg Aldan

==== Group 4-Final ====
(Russian Soviet Federative Socialist Republic) Signal Obninsk
(Estonian Soviet Socialist Republic) Mayak Tallinn

=== Championship round ===
==== Group A ====
Pos	Team	Pld	W	D	L	GF	GA	GD	Pts	AGR	MET	SIG	MKH
1	(Moldavian Soviet Socialist Republic) Agros-Intex Chișinău (H)	3	2	0	1	7	8	−1	4	—	0–4	5–3	2–1
2	(Russian Soviet Federative Socialist Republic) Metallurg Aldan	3	1	1	1	8	6	+2	3	4–0	—	3–3	1–3
3	(Russian Soviet Federative Socialist Republic) Signal Obninsk	3	1	1	1	9	10	−1	3	3–5	3–3	—	3–2
4	(Ukrainian Soviet Socialist Republic) Mekhanizator Dnepropetrovsk	3	1	0	2	6	6	0	2	1–2	3–1	2–3	—

(H) Hosts

==== Group B ====
Pos	Team	Pld	W	D	L	GF	GA	GD	Pts	KSM	FOR	EDE	MAY
1	(Russian Soviet Federative Socialist Republic) KSM-24 Moscow	3	3	0	0	18	6	+12	6	—	3–2	3–2	12–2
2	(Latvian Soviet Socialist Republic) Forum Riga	3	2	0	1	16	5	+11	4	2–3	—	8–0	6–2
3	(Russian Soviet Federative Socialist Republic) Edelveis Rostov-on-Don	3	1	0	2	5	13	−8	2	2–3	0–8	—	3–2
4	(Estonian Soviet Socialist Republic) Mayak Tallinn	3	0	0	3	6	21	−15	0	2–12	2–6	2–3	—

==== Final ====
Pos	Team	Pld	W	D	L	GF	GA	GD	Pts	KSM	MET	AGR	FOR
1	(Russian Soviet Federative Socialist Republic) KSM-24 Moscow	3	2	1	0	8	6	+2	5	—	3–2	2–2	3–2
2	(Russian Soviet Federative Socialist Republic) Metallurg Aldan	3	2	0	1	8	3	+5	4	2–3	—	4–0	2–0
3	(Moldavian Soviet Socialist Republic) Agros-Intex Chișinău (H)	3	0	2	1	3	7	−4	2	2–2	0–4	—	1–1
4	(Latvian Soviet Socialist Republic) Forum Riga	3	0	1	2	3	6	−3	1	2–3	0–2	1–1	—

(H) Hosts

Pos	Team	Pld	W	D	L	GF	GA	GD	Pts	EDE	SIG	MAY	MKH
5	(Russian Soviet Federative Socialist Republic) Edelveis Rostov-on-Don	3	3	0	0	11	7	+4	6	—	3–2	3–2	5–3
6	(Russian Soviet Federative Socialist Republic) Signal Obninsk	3	2	0	1	8	7	+1	4	2–3	—	3–2	3–2
7	(Estonian Soviet Socialist Republic) Mayak Tallinn	3	1	0	2	13	13	0	2	2–3	2–3	—	9–7
8	(Ukrainian Soviet Socialist Republic) Mekhanizator Dnepropetrovsk	3	0	0	3	12	17	−5	0	3–5	2–3	7–9	—

== CIS Championship ==
=== Final standing ===
Pos	Team	Pld	W	D	L	GF	GA	GD	Pts
1	(Russia) Dina Moskva	10	8	2	0	45	16	+29	18
2	(Russia) Spartak Moscow	10	5	3	2	36	28	+8	13
3	(Russia) Stroitel Verkh-Neyvinsky	10	5	1	4	28	32	−4	11
4	(Russia) KSM-24 Moscow	11	3	4	4	35	31	+4	10
5	(Kazakhstan) Khimik Kostanay	10	2	1	7	28	43	−15	5
6	(Russia) Rostselmash Rostov-on-Don	10	1	1	8	17	39	−22	3

== USSR Cup ==
=== Final four ===
Semi-finals
(Ukrainian Soviet Socialist Republic) Mekhanizator Dnepropetrovsk	3
(Moldavian Soviet Socialist Republic) Agros-Intex Chișinău	0
(Moldavian Soviet Socialist Republic) Valeologia Chișinău	2
(Russian Soviet Federative Socialist Republic) Metallurg Aldan	1

Final
(Ukrainian Soviet Socialist Republic) Mekhanizator Dnepropetrovsk (pen.)	3(5)
(Moldavian Soviet Socialist Republic) Valeologia Chișinău	3(3)
Third place
(Moldavian Soviet Socialist Republic) Agros-Intex Chișinău	2
(Russian Soviet Federative Socialist Republic) Metallurg Aldan	1
