= Glavatskikh =

Glavatskikh (Russian: Главатских) is a Russian gender-neutral surname originating from глава meaning head, leader. It may refer to

- Konstantin Glavatskikh (born 1985), Russian cross-country skier
- Roman Glavatskikh (born 1983), Russian futsal player
