= 1994–95 in Russian futsal =

== National student team ==
4th World University Futsal Championship 1994 in Nicosia, Cyprus

Win Draw Loss

18 September 1994 Group B	Russia	10–0	Belgium	Nicosia

19 September 1994 Group B	Russia	5–0	Israel	Nicosia

20 September 1994 Group B	Russia	6–1	Poland	Nicosia

22 September 1994 1/4 final	Russia	3–3 pen. 4–3	Brazil	Nicosia

23 September 1994 1/2 final	Russia	4–0	Italy	Nicosia

24 September 1994 Final	Russia	6–5 (a.e.t.)	Spain	Nicosia

== Futsal European Clubs Championship ==
Win Draw Loss

10 May 1995 Group A	Dina Moscow (Russia)	9–1	(Croatia) Sokoli	Maspalomas

11 May 1995 Group A	Dina Moscow (Russia)	4–3	(Italy) Torrino S.C.	Maspalomas

13 May 1995 Final	Maspalomas Sol Europa (Spain)	5–6	(Russia) Dina Moscow	Maspalomas

== Top League ==
3rd Russian futsal championship 1994/1995

Pos	Team	Pld	W	D	L	GF	GA	GD	Pts	Qualification or relegation
1	(Moscow) Dina Moskva (C)	30	27	1	2	205	74	+131	55	
2	Minkas Moscow	30	22	6	2	147	71	+76	50	
3	(Sverdlovsk Oblast) VIZ Yekaterinburg	30	16	7	7	122	90	+32	39	
4	Spartak Moscow (Note: Merge with Novorus Moscow in 1995-96 season)	30	15	6	9	106	83	+23	36	
5	MKZ Torpedo Moscow	30	14	7	9	83	74	+9	35	
6	(Sverdlovsk Oblast) Stroitel Novouralsk	30	11	9	10	94	110	−16	31	
7	(Novosibirsk Oblast) Sibiryak Novosibirsk	30	10	8	12	91	107	−16	28	
8	(Chelyabinsk Oblast) Fenix Chelyabinsk	30	10	8	12	107	132	−25	28	
9	KSM-24 Moscow	30	9	9	12	90	82	+8	27	
10	(Saint Petersburg) PSI St. Petersburg	30	7	12	11	95	100	−5	26	
11	(Sverdlovsk Oblast) Atrium-UPI Yekaterinburg	30	9	6	15	116	128	−12	24	
12	Novorus Moscow (Note: Merge with Spartak Moscow in 1995-96 season)	30	9	5	16	86	120	−34	23	
13	(Sverdlovsk Oblast) Luch Yekaterinburg	30	7	9	14	83	109	−26	23	
14	(Nizhny Novgorod Oblast) Krona Nizhny Novgorod (R)	30	6	11	13	78	111	−33	23	Qualification to Relegation tournament
15	Chertanovo Moscow (O)	30	8	4	18	89	123	−34	20	Qualification to Relegation tournament
16	(Saint Petersburg) Galax St. Petersburg (R)	30	4	4	22	76	149	−73	12	Relegation to First League

Source: dina.ru
Rules for classification: 1) points; 2) number of wins; 3) goal difference; 4) number of goals scored.
(C) Champions; (O) Play-off winners; (R) Relegated

=== Promotion tournament ===
Pos	Team	Pld	W	D	L	GF	GA	GD	Pts	Promotion or relegation
1	(Saint Petersburg) Polese St. Petersburg (P)	3	3	0	0	8	3	+5	6	Promotion to Top League
2	Chertanovo Moscow (P)	3	2	0	1	8	6	+2	4	Promotion to Top League
3	(Novgorod Oblast) Zarya Novgorod (R)	3	1	0	2	9	8	+1	2	Relegation to First League
4	(Nizhny Novgorod Oblast) Krona Nizhny Novgorod (R)	3	0	0	3	7	15	−8	0	Relegation to First League

Rules for classification: 1) points; 2) number of wins; 3) goal difference; 4) number of goals scored.
(P) Promoted; (R) Relegated

== National Cup ==
=== Final Four ===
Semifinals
(Moscow) Dina Moskva	5
(Sverdlovsk Oblast) VIZ Yekaterinburg	4
Novorus Moscow	1
Minkas Moscow	2

Final
(Moscow) Dina Moskva	5
Minkas Moscow	6
Third place
(Sverdlovsk Oblast) VIZ Yekaterinburg	2
Novorus Moscow (a.e.t.)	3

== Top League Cup ==
Quarterfinals
1	(Moscow) Dina	4	5	8
4	(Moscow) Spartak	3	1	3
Moscow
2	(Moscow) Minkas	-	-	5
5	(Moscow) Torpedo	+	+	6
3	(Sverdlovsk Oblast) VIZ	3	9	4	4
6	(Sverdlovsk Oblast) Stroitel	1	8	5	3
Ural
7	(Novosibirsk Oblast) Sibiryak	8	5	3
5	(Chelyabinsk Oblast) Fenix	9	9	4

Semifinals
1	(Moscow) Dina	4	5	6
5	(Moscow) Torpedo	2	3	0
3	(Sverdlovsk Oblast) VIZ	9	3	3
8	(Chelyabinsk Oblast) Fenix	8	1	2

Final
1	(Moscow) Dina	4
3	(Sverdlovsk Oblast) VIZ	1

== First League ==
=== First stage ===
==== First group ====
Pos	Team	Pld	W	D	L	GF	GA	GD	Pts	Qualification
1	(Saint Petersburg) Samson St. Petersburg (A)	17	14	1	2	80	28	+52	29	Qualification to Second stage
2	Chertanovo RGAFK Moscow (A)	17	8	4	5	50	40	+10	20	Qualification to Second stage
3	(Krasnoyarsk Krai) Norilsk (A)	17	7	1	9	46	53	−7	15	Qualification to Second stage
4	(Moscow Oblast) Shchyolkovo	17	5	5	7	50	60	−10	15	
5	(Yakutia) Universitet Yakutsk	17	4	2	11	32	60	−28	10	
6	Assiriya Moscow	5	0	1	4	8	25	−17	1	Withdraw after 1st tour

Rules for classification: 1) points; 2) number of wins; 3) goal difference; 4) number of goals scored.
(A) Advance to a further round

==== Second group ====
Pos	Team	Pld	W	D	L	GF	GA	GD	Pts	Qualification
1	(Saint Petersburg) Polese St. Petersburg (A)	16	12	1	3	87	55	+32	25	Qualification to Second stage
2	(Novgorod Oblast) Zarya Novgorod (A)	16	10	3	3	90	61	+29	23	Qualification to Second stage
3	(Saint Petersburg) Maccabi St. Petersburg (A)	16	8	3	5	70	56	+14	19	Qualification to Second stage
4	(Arkhangelsk Oblast) Gadvikbank Arkhangelsk	16	5	1	10	58	68	−10	11	
5	(Samara Oblast) Rubin Tolyatti	16	1	0	15	50	115	−65	2	

Rules for classification: 1) points; 2) number of wins; 3) goal difference; 4) number of goals scored.
(A) Advance to a further round

==== Third group ====
Pos	Team	Pld	W	D	L	GF	GA	GD	Pts	Qualification
1	(Samara Oblast) Avtograd-SKA Tolyatti (A)	20	17	1	2	91	41	+50	35	Qualification to Second stage
2	(Saratov Oblast) Roma Saratov (A)	20	13	3	4	84	58	+26	29	Qualification to Second stage
3	(Saratov Oblast) VVUT Volsk (A)	20	10	3	7	81	61	+20	23	Qualification to Second stage
4	TAF Moscow	20	9	3	8	77	85	−8	21	
5	(Chuvashia) Standart Cheboksary	20	4	1	15	51	103	−52	9	
6	(Voronezh Oblast) Vassa Voronezh	20	1	1	18	40	76	−36	3	

Rules for classification: 1) points; 2) number of wins; 3) goal difference; 4) number of goals scored.
(A) Advance to a further round

==== Fourth group ====
Pos	Team	Pld	W	D	L	GF	GA	GD	Pts	Qualification
1	(Khanty-Mansi Autonomous Okrug) TTG Yugorsk (A)	13	11	0	2	73	38	+35	22	Qualification to Second stage
2	(Chelyabinsk Oblast) Stroitel-7 Chelyabinsk (A)	13	10	1	2	81	38	+43	21	Qualification to Second stage
3	(Chelyabinsk Oblast) Polyus Zlatoust (A)	13	4	1	8	43	51	−8	9	Qualification to Second stage
4	(Tomsk Oblast) Yupiter Seversk	13	1	0	12	27	89	−62	2	
5	(Bashkortostan) Khimik Meleuz	4	1	0	3	10	18	−8	2	Withdraw after 1st tour
6	(Yakutia) Koncentrat Neryungri	0	0	0	0	0	0	0	0	Withdraw before start championship

Rules for classification: 1) points; 2) number of wins; 3) goal difference; 4) number of goals scored.
(A) Advance to a further round

==== Fifth group ====
Pos	Team	Pld	W	D	L	GF	GA	GD	Pts	Qualification
1	(Krasnoyarsk Krai) Zarya Yemelyanovo (A)	20	19	0	1	178	44	+134	38	Qualification to Second stage
2	(Krasnoyarsk Krai) Zvezda Minusinsk (A)	20	14	2	4	138	109	+29	30	Qualification to Second stage
3	(Krasnoyarsk Krai) Spartak-Atom Zheleznogorsk	20	10	2	8	121	107	+14	22	
4	(Krasnoyarsk Krai) Metallurg Krasnoyarsk	20	8	1	11	96	108	−12	17	
5	(Krasnoyarsk Krai) Grand Achinsk	20	6	0	14	86	153	−67	12	
6	(Krasnoyarsk Krai) Torpedo Sosnovoborsk	20	0	1	19	76	173	−97	1	Withdraw after 3rd tour

Rules for classification: 1) points; 2) number of wins; 3) goal difference; 4) number of goals scored.
(A) Advance to a further round

=== Second stage ===
==== Group A ====
Pos	Team	Pld	W	D	L	GF	GA	GD	Pts	Promotion or qualification
1	(Khanty-Mansi Autonomous Okrug) TTG Yugorsk (P)	12	10	2	0	68	21	+47	22	Promotion to Top League
2	(Novgorod Oblast) Zarya Novgorod (A)	12	7	3	2	53	34	+19	17	Qualification to Promotion tournament
3	(Saint Petersburg) Samson St. Petersburg	12	6	4	2	44	24	+20	16	
4	(Krasnoyarsk Krai) Zvezda Minusinsk	12	6	1	5	49	61	−12	13	
5	(Saratov Oblast) VVUT Volsk	12	2	2	8	27	61	−34	6	
6	(Saratov Oblast) Roma Saratov	12	2	0	10	22	48	−26	4	Withdraw after 1st tour
7	(Saint Petersburg) Maccabi St. Petersburg	12	1	2	9	22	42	−20	4	Withdraw after 1st tour

Rules for classification: 1) points; 2) number of wins; 3) goal difference; 4) number of goals scored.
(A) Advance to a further round; (P) Promoted

==== Group B ====
1. Stroitel-7 Chelyabinsk
2. Polese St. Petersburg

== Women's League ==
3rd Women's Russian futsal championship 1994/1995

=== Top League Final standing ===
Rank	Team
1	(Volgograd Oblast) Kontur-Yunior Volgograd
2	(Saint Petersburg) Baltika St. Petersburg
3	(Vladimir Oblast) Vlada Vladimir
4	(Saint Petersburg) Avrora St. Petersburg
5	(Moscow Oblast) Gloria Khimki
6	(Moscow Oblast) Orlenok Krasnoarmeysk
7	(Saratov Oblast) Volzhanka Saratov
8	(Primorsky Krai) Burevestnik-UGPI Ussuriysk

=== First League Final standing ===
Rank	Team
1	(Nizhny Novgorod Oblast) Viktoria Nizhny Novgorod Region (P)
n/a	MGU Moscow (P)
n/a	(Moscow Oblast) Nadezhda Voskresensk (P)
n/a	(Tula Oblast) TGPU Nika Tula
n/a	(Sverdlovsk Oblast) Yunost Rossii Yekaterinburg
n/a	(Republic of Karelia) Ladoga Olonets
n/a	(Saratov Oblast) Volzhanka-d Saratov
n/a	(Tula Oblast) Rarus Tula

== Women's National Cup ==
Final
(Saint Petersburg) Baltika St. Petersburg	3
(Volgograd Oblast) Kontur-Yunior Volgograd	1
