= 1999 UEFA Futsal Championship squads =

This article lists the confirmed national futsal squads for the 1999 UEFA Futsal Championship tournament held in Spain.
