= Alexey Stepanov =

Russian footballer and futsal player

Personal information
- Full name: Alexey Stepanov
- Date of birth: 20 January 1960
- Place of birth: Leningrad, USSR
- Date of death: 30 June 2002 (aged 42)
- Place of death: Ekaterinburg, Russia
- Height: 1.85 m (6 ft 1 in)
- Position: Defender

Youth career
- Dinamo, Leningrad
- Karshistroy

Senior career*
Years	Team	Apps	(Gls)
1991–1994	Dina Moscow	61	(14)
1994–1995	KSM-24	4	(3)
1996–1997	PSI	6	(1)

International career
1991	USSR	2	(122)
1992	CIS	7	(5)
1992	Russia	6	(2)
- * Club domestic league appearances and goals

Alexey Stepanov (January 20, 1960, Leningrad, USSR – June 30, 2002, Ekaterinburg, Russia) – Russian football and futsal player, defender.

== Biography ==
Stepanov started playing football in famous Petersburg school Smena. Most part of career he spent in Zenit Saint Petersburg, where he won Soviet Top League in 1984. Stepanov finished his career in Lokomotiv Saint-Petersburg in 1992.

In 1991 – 1994 performed in futsal club Dina. For three times won CIS and Russian championship. Played 15 matches for national futsal team. The first captain in history of Russian futsal team. Member of Russian side on Futsal World Championship 1992.

In 2001 worked as sport director of Zenit. In 2002 became a president of FC Tyumen.

On 30 June 2002 died in Ekaterinburg due to heart attack.

== Achievements ==
=== Club ===
Soviet Top League winner: 1984

CIS Futsal Championship winner: 1992

Russian Futsal Championship winner: 1992/93, 1993/94

=== Individual ===
Russian Futsal Championship best defender: 1992

One of two players (with Boris Chuhlov) in history who won national championship both in football and futsal
