= 1996 UEFA Futsal Championship =

Eurocopa de fútbol sala de 1996

Tournament details
- Host country: Spain
- Dates: 8–14 January
- Teams: 6 (from 1 confederation)
- Venue: 1 (in 1 host city)

Final positions
- Champions: Spain (1st title)
- Runners-up: Russia
- Third place: Belgium
- Fourth place: Italy

Tournament statistics
- Top scorer: (Russia) Konstantin Eremenko (8 goals)
- Best player: (Spain) Paulo Roberto

The 1996 UEFA Futsal Championship was the first official edition of the UEFA-governed European Championship for national futsal teams. It was held in Spain, between January 8 and January 14, 1996, in one venue located in the city of Córdoba.

== Qualification ==
=== Qualified teams ===
Country
Spain
Belgium
Netherlands
Ukraine
Russia
Italy

== Venue ==
Arena	Pabellón Vista Alegre
Image	
City	Córdoba
Capacity	4,000

== Group stage ==
=== Group A ===
Team	Pts	Pld	W	D	L	GF	GA	GD
Spain	4	2	1	1	0	4	3	+1
Belgium	3	2	1	0	1	3	2	+1
Netherlands	1	2	0	1	1	2	4	-2

8 January 1996

Spain	2–1	Belgium
	Report

Vista Alegre, Córdoba
Attendance: 3100
Referee: Lars Gerner (DEN), Stefan Tivold (SVN)

9 January 1996

Netherlands	0–2	Belgium
	Report

Vista Alegre, Córdoba
Attendance: 500

10 January 1996

Spain	2–2	Netherlands
	Report

Vista Alegre, Córdoba
Attendance: 3500

=== Group B ===
Team	Pts	Pld	W	D	L	GF	GA	GD
Russia	6	2	2	0	0	8	3	+5
Italy	3	2	1	0	1	7	8	-1
Ukraine	0	2	0	0	2	5	9	-4

8 January 1996

Russia	3–2	Ukraine
	Report

Vista Alegre, Córdoba
Attendance: 2000
Referee: Sándor Piller (HUN), Charles Schaack (LUX)

9 January 1996

Italy	6– 3	Ukraine
	Report

Vista Alegre, Córdoba
Attendance: 800
Referee: Bohdan Benedik (SVK), Lars Gerner (DEN)

10 January 1996

Russia	5–1	Italy
	Report

Vista Alegre, Córdoba
Attendance: 2000
Referee: Charles Schaack (LUX), Bento Marques (POR)

== Knockout stage ==
Semifinals
12 January 1996 – Córdoba
Spain	4
Italy	1
12 January 1996 – Córdoba
Russia	6
Belgium	2

Final
14 January 1996 – Córdoba
Spain	5
Russia	3
Third place
13 January 1996 – Córdoba
Italy	2
Belgium (a.e.t.)	3

=== Semi-finals ===
12 January 1996

Spain	4–1	Italy
	Report

Vista Alegre, Córdoba
Attendance: 3500
Referee: Lars Gerner (DEN), Sándor Piller (HUN)

12 January 1996

Russia	6–2	Belgium
	Report

Vista Alegre, Córdoba
Attendance: 2000
Referee: Stefan Tivold (SVN), Bohdan Benedik (SVK)

=== Fifth-place play-off ===
13 January 1996

Netherlands	3–4 (a.e.t.)	Ukraine
	Report

Vista Alegre, Córdoba
Attendance: 500

=== Third-place play-off ===
13 January 1996

Italy	2–3 (a.e.t.)	Belgium
	Report

Vista Alegre, Córdoba
Attendance: 2000

=== Final ===
14 January 1996

Spain	5–3	Russia
Vicentín 11'01", 26'30", 26'45", 33'08"; Paulo Roberto 19'55"	Report	Kiselyov 19'50"; Yeryomenko 21'04", 31'07"

Vista Alegre, Córdoba
Attendance: 4300
Referee: Sándor Piller (HUN), Lars Gerner (DEN)

== Champions ==
1996 UEFA Futsal Championship winners

Spain
First title

== Tournament ranking ==
Per statistical convention in football, matches decided in extra time are counted as wins and losses, while matches decided by penalty shoot-out are counted as draws.

Pos	Team	Pld	W	D	L	GF	GA	GD	Pts	Final result
1	Spain	4	3	1	0	13	7	+6	10	Champions
2	Russia	4	3	0	1	17	10	+7	9	Runners-up
3	Belgium	4	2	0	2	8	10	-2	6	Third place
4	Italy	4	1	0	3	10	15	-5	3	Fourth place
5	Ukraine	3	1	0	2	9	12	-3	3	Eliminated in Group stage
6	Netherlands	3	0	1	2	5	8	-3	1	Eliminated in Group stage
