= Roman Glavatskikh =

Russian futsal player

Personal information
- Date of birth: 3 May 1983 (age 43)
- Place of birth: Novouralsk, USSR
- Height: 1.71 m (5 ft 7 1/2 in)
- Position: Forward

Team information
- Current team: Dina Moscow
- Number: 11

Senior career*
Years	Team	Apps	(Gls)
2000–2003	Stroitel	78	(29)
2003–2004	Progress		
2004	UPI DDT		
2004–2005	Spartak	24	(2)
2006–2007	Norilsk Nickel	49	(7)
2007–2009	Spartak Schelkovo	63	(20)
2009–2010	Sibiryak	17	(5)
2010–2011	Polytech	22	(12)
2011–	Dina Moscow	103	(35)
- * Club domestic league appearances and goals as of 2 April 2015

Roman Glavatskikh (born 3 May 1983 in Novoural'sk, USSR) is a Russian futsal player. Forward of the Moscow club Dina Moscow.

== Biography ==
Glavatskikh was born in the city of Novouralsk, the Sverdlovsk region. There he began his futsal career, becoming a player of a local club "Stroitel”, which was playing in the premiere league for that moment, the second division in the structure of national futsal. There he played for three seasons, then moved to Glazov "Progress", and later - to Yekaterinburg "UPI-DDT". With that team he debuted in the Super League.

In 2004 Glavatskikh moved to "Spartak" (Moscow), one and half season later – to "Norilsk Nickel". In these clubs Roman failed to express himself. He played much better in the Moscow club "Spartak-Schelkovo", to which he moved in 2007. In 2009 Glavatskikh left "Spartak Schelkovo" due to financial problems of the club which forced the club to move to the Premiere League. The following season he spent in "Sibiryak". Roman started the next season in "Polytech" (St. Petersburg). Having spent a successful year, in the summer of 2011 he moved to Dina Moscow.

== Achievements ==
Russian Futsal Championship Winner (1): 2014
