= 1999 UEFA Futsal Championship =

Eurocopa de fútbol sala de 1999

Tournament details
- Host country: Spain
- Dates: 22–28 February
- Teams: 8 (from 1 confederation)
- Venue: 1 (in 1 host city)

Final positions
- Champions: Russia (1st title)
- Runners-up: Spain
- Third place: Italy
- Fourth place: Netherlands

Tournament statistics
- Top scorer: (Russia) Konstantin Eremenko (11 goals)
- Best player: (Russia) Konstantin Eremenko

The 1999 UEFA Futsal Championship was the second official edition of the UEFA-governed European Championship for national futsal teams. It was held in Spain, between 22 February and 28 February 1999, in one venue located in the city of Granada.

== Qualification ==
=== Qualified teams ===
Country
Croatia
Spain
Netherlands
Yugoslavia
Belgium
Italy
Portugal
Russia

== Venue ==
Arena	Palacio Municipal de Deportes
City	Granada
Capacity	7,500

== Group stage ==
=== Group A ===
Team	Pld	W	D	L	GF	GA	Pts
Spain	3	3	0	0	11	3	9
Netherlands	3	1	1	1	10	7	4
Croatia	3	1	0	2	8	14	3
Yugoslavia	3	0	1	2	5	10	1

22 February 1999

Croatia	4–3	Yugoslavia
Martić 2'; Jelovčić 25', 34'; Eklić 26'		Vujović 5'; Ćetković 7'; Vignjević 38'

22 February 1999

Spain	3–1	Netherlands
Ferreira 23'; Llorente 34', 39'		Langenhuijsen 31'

23 February 1999

Netherlands	1–1	Yugoslavia
Lettinck 16'		Pržulj 21'

23 February 1999

Spain	3–1	Croatia
Llorente 5'; Joan 23'; Santi 31'		Malvasija 35'

25 February 1999

Netherlands	8–3	Croatia
Zeelig 3', 32'; Lettinck 5'; Frankfort 7'; Langenhuijsen 8', 14'; Van Dijk 9'; Grünholz 35'		Grdović 6'; Huskić 36'; Tomičić 37'

25 February 1999

Yugoslavia	1–5	Spain
Pržulj 35'		Pato 24'; Llorente 26', 29'; Riquer 32'; Cobeta 37'

=== Group B ===
Team	Pld	W	D	L	GF	GA	Pts
Russia	3	2	1	0	11	5	7
Italy	3	1	2	0	8	6	5
Portugal	3	0	2	1	4	6	2
Belgium	3	0	1	2	1	7	1

22 February 1999

Belgium	0–0	Portugal

22 February 1999

Russia	3–3	Italy
Gorine 13'; Eremenko 19', 35'		Caleca 35'; Quattrini 36'; Rubei 39'

23 February 1999

Italy	3–3	Portugal
Veronesi 15'; Rubei 25'; Quattrini 32'		Nelito 10', 26'; André 36'

23 February 1999

Russia	5–1	Belgium
Belyi 17'; Agafonov 28'; Eremenko 37', 40'; Alekberov 37'		Gessner 26'

25 February 1999

Portugal	1–3	Russia
Zezito 30'		Eremenko 9', 23'; Tkachuk 12'

25 February 1999

Italy	2–0	Belgium
Rubei 13'; Roma 37'

== Knockout stage ==
Semifinals
26 February 1999 – Granada
Russia	9
Netherlands	6
26 February 1999 – Granada
Spain	3
Italy	1

Final
28 February 1999 – Granada
Russia (p)	3 (4)
Spain	3 (2)
Third place
28 February 1999 – Granada
Netherlands	0
Italy	3

=== Semi-finals ===
26 February 1999

Russia	9–6	Netherlands
Gorine 2'; Eremenko 5', 36', 36', 39'; Markin 15', 22'; Alekberov 21'; Verizhnikov 26'	Report	Grünholz 16', 34'; Langenhujisen 17', 32', 38', 40'

Palacio de Deportes, Granada
Attendance: 1500

26 February 1999

Spain	3–1	Italy
Joan 3', 26'; Ferreira de Araujo 5'	Report	Franzoi 22'

Palacio de Deportes, Granada
Attendance: 5000

=== Third place play-off ===
28 February 1999

Netherlands	0–3	Italy
	Report	Caleca 13'; Roma 20'; Rubei 36'

Palacio de Deportes, Granada

=== Final ===
28 February 1999

Russia	3–3	Spain
Belyi 27'; Alekberov 33'; Eremenko 34'	Report	Llorente 8', 35'; Javi Sánchez 34'
Penalties
Gorine (penalty scored); Verizhnikov (penalty scored); Alekberov (penalty scored); Eremenko (penalty scored)	4–2	(penalty scored) Ferreira de Araujo; (penalty scored) Mena (penalty missed) (penalty missed)

Palacio de Deportes, Granada
Attendance: 7500

== Champions ==
1999 UEFA Futsal Championship winners

Russia
First title

== Tournament ranking ==
Per statistical convention in football, matches decided in extra time are counted as wins and losses, while matches decided by penalty shoot-out are counted as draws.

Pos	Team	Pld	W	D	L	GF	GA	GD	Pts	Final result
1	Russia	5	3	2	0	23	14	+9	11	Champions
2	Spain	5	4	1	0	17	7	+10	13	Runners-up
3	Italy	5	2	2	1	12	9	+3	8	Third place
4	Netherlands	5	1	1	3	16	19	-3	4	Fourth place
5	Croatia	3	1	0	2	8	14	-6	3	Eliminated in Group stage
6	Portugal	3	0	2	1	4	6	-2	2	Eliminated in Group stage
7	Yugoslavia	3	0	1	2	5	10	-5	1	Eliminated in Group stage
8	Belgium	3	0	1	2	1	7	-6	1	Eliminated in Group stage
