= Serhiy Koridze =

Ukrainian futsal player

Personal information
- Full name: Serhiy Hivivych Koridze
- Date of birth: 6 December 1975
- Place of birth: Odesa, USSR
- Height: 1.78 m (5 ft 10 in)
- Positions: Defender (football); Pivot (futsal)

Youth career
- Chornomorets Odesa

Senior career*
Years	Team	Apps	(Gls)
1992–1993	Chornomorets-2 Odesa	35	(0)
1994	Anzhi Makhachkala	23	(2)
1994	Torpedo Odesa	5	(0)
- -- Futsal career --
1995–1998	Lokomotyv Odesa	77	(126)
1998–2001	Interkas Kyiv	44	(151)
2001–2004	Dina Moscow	?	(135)
2004–2008	Spartak Shchelkovo	?	(99)
2008–2011	TTG-Yugra Yugorsk	91	(44)
2011	KPRF Moscow	?	(?)

International career
	Ukraine (futsal)	57	(65)
- * Club domestic league appearances and goals

Serhiy Hivivych Koridze, (Ukrainian: Сергій Гівівич Корідзе; born 6 December 1975) is a Ukrainian futsal player.

== Career ==
Serhiy Koridze was a football player in his youth. He began his professional career in 1992 for the Chornomorets-2 Odesa. In 1994, he played for FC Anzhi Makhachkala, but turned to futsal in 1995. Koridze played for the Lokomotyv Odesa. In 1998, he moved to the Interkas Kyiv. In 2001 Koridze went to Russia, where he later played for the Dina Moscow, Spartak Shchelkovo, TTG-Yugra Yugorsk and KPRF Moscow.

In the Ukraine national futsal team Serhiy Koridze was twice a silver medalist of UEFA Futsal Championship - in 2001 and 2003. Both of these tournaments, he left with the rank of top scorer.

He also became the top scorer for the Ukraine national team.

== Honours ==
=== Club ===
- UEFA Futsal Championship runner-up: 2001, 2003
- Futsal European Clubs Championship third place: 1997
- Ukrainian Men's Futsal Championship winner (5): 1995/96, 1996/97, 1997/98, 1998/99, 1999/00
- Russian Futsal Super League runner-up: 2003/04
- Ukrainian Men's Futsal Cup winner (3): 1997, 1998, 2001
- Russian Futsal Cup winner: 2005

=== Individual ===
- UEFA Futsal Championship top scorer (2): 2001, 2003
- Ukraine national team top scorer (65)
- Ukrainian Men's Futsal Championship top scorer (3)
- Russian Futsal Super League top scorer: 2003/04
- Russian Futsal Super League best forward (2): 2001/02, 2002/03
- Order of the Association of Futsal Odesa region Honour
