= Andrea Rubei =

Italian futsal player

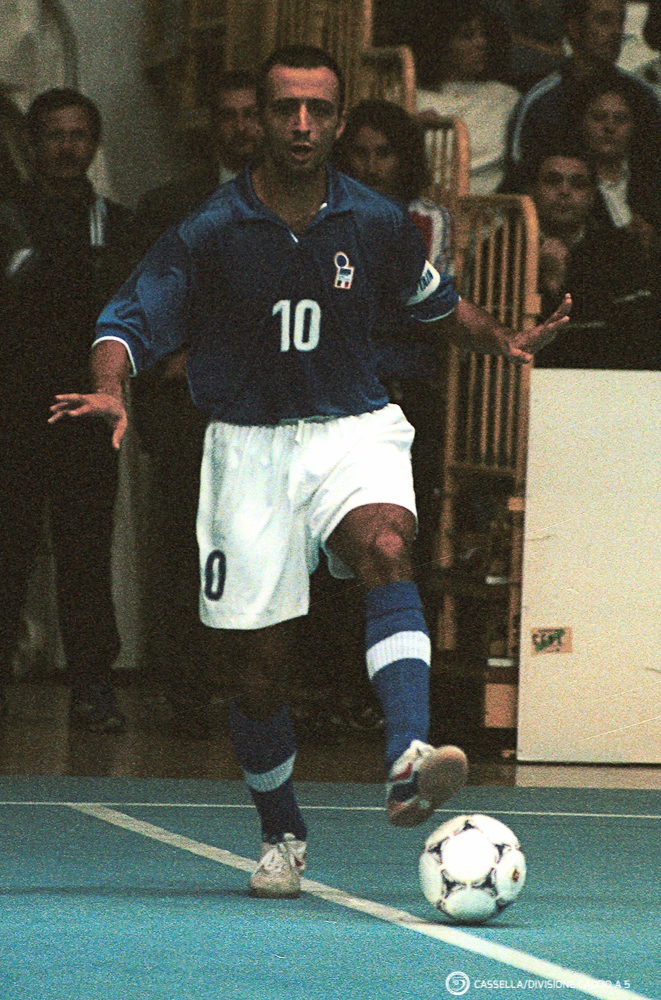

Personal information
- Full name: Andrea Rubei
- Date of birth: 20 December 1966 (age 59)
- Place of birth: Rome, Italy
- Height: 1.75 m (5 ft 9 in)
- Position: Universal

Senior career*
Years	Team	Apps	(Gls)
1987–1989	Poggio Verde		
1989–1990	Marino Calcetto		
1990–1991	Sport House		
1991–1992	Roma RCB		
1992–1996	Torrino		
1996–1997	Lazio		
1997–1999	Torino		
1999–2002	BNL Roma		
2002–2004	Prato		
2004–2005	Nepi		
2005–2007	Torrino		
2009–2010	Palestrina		
2010–2011	L'Acquedotto		
2011–2012	Castel Fontana		
2012–2014	Lodigiani		
2014–2015	Capitolina Marconi		
2015–2016	Isola		
2016–2017	Capitolina Marconi		

International career^{‡}
1992–2006	Italy	89	(97)
- * Club domestic league appearances and goals as of 00:00, 21 February 2021 (UTC) ‡ National team caps and goals as of 00:00, 21 February 2021 (UTC)

Andrea Rubei (born 20 December 1966) is an Italian former futsal player who was a universal player for several teams in the Italian Serie A and the Italian national team. Regarded by some as the best Italian futsal player of all time, Rubei was crowned Italian champion on four occasions, twice with Torrino, and once with both Torino and Prato. Upon his retirement from the national team Rubei was the team's top goal scorer and achieved the impressive feat of scoring a higher number of goals than his number of caps.

== Honours ==
Torrino

- Serie A: 1992–1993, 1993–94
- Coppa Italia: 1992–93, 1993–94, 1994–95

Torino

- Serie A: 1998–99
- Supercoppa Italiana: 1997, 1998

Prato

- Serie A: 2002–03
- Coppa Italia: 2003–04
- Supercoppa Italiana: 2002, 2003

Nepi

- Coppa Italia: 2004–05

Isola

- Serie A2: 2015–16

Individual

- Serie A top scorer: 1993–94
