= Paulo Roberto (futsal player) =

Brazilian-born Spanish futsal player

Personal information
- Full name: Paulo Roberto Marques Roris
- Date of birth: 12 August 1967 (age 59)
- Place of birth: Rio de Janeiro, Brazil
- Height: 1.75 m (5 ft 9 in)
- Position: Pivot

Senior career*
Years	Team	Apps	(Gls)
1988–1992	Marsanz		
1992–1994	Redislogar Madrid		
1994–2005	ElPozo Murcia		

International career
1994–2001	Spain		
- * Club domestic league appearances and goals

Paulo Roberto Marques Roris (born 12 August 1967) is a former Brazilian born, Spanish futsal player, best known for his spell with ElPozo Murcia as a Pivot.

== Career ==
Roberto was nicknamed "Maravilla".
