= 2001 UEFA Futsal Championship =

Чемпионат Европы по мини-футболу 2001

Tournament details
- Host country: Russia
- Dates: 22–28 February
- Teams: 8 (from 1 confederation)
- Venue: 1 (in 1 host city)

Final positions
- Champions: Spain (2nd title)
- Runners-up: Ukraine
- Third place: Russia
- Fourth place: Italy

Tournament statistics
- Top scorer: (Ukraine) Serhiy Koridze (7 goals)
- Best player: (Spain) Javi Sánchez

The 2001 UEFA Futsal Championship was the third official edition of the UEFA-governed European Championship for national futsal teams. It was held in Russia, between 22 February and 28 February 2001, in one venue located in the city of Moscow.

== Qualification ==
=== Qualified teams ===
Country
Spain
Ukraine
Poland
Croatia
Russia
Italy
Netherlands
Czech Republic

== Venue ==
| Arena | Luzhniki Palace of Sports |
|---|---|
| City | Moscow |
| Capacity | 12,500 |

== Group stage ==
=== Group A ===
| Team | Pld | W | D | L | GF | GA | Pts |
|---|---|---|---|---|---|---|---|
| Spain | 3 | 3 | 0 | 0 | 15 | 3 | 9 |
| Ukraine | 3 | 2 | 0 | 1 | 14 | 7 | 6 |
| Croatia | 3 | 1 | 0 | 2 | 2 | 9 | 3 |
| Poland | 3 | 0 | 0 | 3 | 6 | 18 | 0 |

22 February 2001

| Spain | 4–1 | Ukraine |

Luzhniki Palace of Sports, Moscow

22 February 2001

| Poland | 1–2 | Croatia |

Luzhniki Palace of Sports, Moscow

23 February 2001

| Ukraine | 5–0 | Croatia |

Luzhniki Palace of Sports, Moscow

23 February 2001

| Spain | 8–2 | Poland |

Luzhniki Palace of Sports, Moscow

25 February 2001

| Ukraine | 8–3 | Poland |

Luzhniki Palace of Sports, Moscow

25 February 2001

| Croatia | 0–3 | Spain |

Luzhniki Palace of Sports, Moscow

=== Group B ===
| Team | Pld | W | D | L | GF | GA | Pts |
|---|---|---|---|---|---|---|---|
| Italy | 3 | 3 | 0 | 0 | 14 | 7 | 9 |
| Russia | 3 | 2 | 0 | 1 | 11 | 6 | 6 |
| Czech Republic | 3 | 0 | 1 | 2 | 9 | 13 | 1 |
| Netherlands | 3 | 0 | 1 | 2 | 3 | 11 | 1 |

22 February 2001

| Netherlands | 3–3 | Czech Republic |

Luzhniki Palace of Sports, Moscow

22 February 2001

| Russia | 3–4 | Italy |

Luzhniki Palace of Sports, Moscow

23 February 2001

| Italy | 6–4 | Czech Republic |

Luzhniki Palace of Sports, Moscow

23 February 2001

| Russia | 4–0 | Netherlands |

Luzhniki Palace of Sports, Moscow

25 February 2001

| Italy | 4–0 | Netherlands |

Luzhniki Palace of Sports, Moscow

25 February 2001

| Czech Republic | 2–4 | Russia |

Luzhniki Palace of Sports, Moscow

== Knockout stage ==
Semifinals
26 February 2001 – Moscow
Spain | 2
Russia | 1
26 February 2001 – Moscow
Italy | 3 (4)
Ukraine (p) | 3 (5)

Final
28 February 2001 – Moscow
Spain (a.e.t.) | 2
Ukraine | 1
Third place
28 February 2001 – Moscow
Russia (a.e.t.) | 2
Italy | 1

=== Semi-finals ===
26 February 2001

| Spain | 2–1 | Russia |
|---|---|---|
| | Report |

Luzhniki, Moscow
Attendance: 6500

26 February 2001

| Italy | 3–3 | Ukraine |
|---|---|---|
| | Report |
Penalties
| | 4–5 |

Luzhniki, Moscow
Attendance: 3000

=== Third place play-off ===
28 February 2001

| Russia | 2–1 (a.e.t.) | Italy |
|---|---|---|
| | Report |

Luzhniki, Moscow
Attendance: 3500

=== Final ===
28 February 2001

| Spain | 2–1 (a.e.t.) | Ukraine |
|---|---|---|
| | Report |

Luzhniki, Moscow
Attendance: 6000

== Champions ==
2001 UEFA Futsal Championship winners

Spain
Second title

== Tournament ranking ==
Per statistical convention in football, matches decided in extra time are counted as wins and losses, while matches decided by penalty shoot-out are counted as draws.

| Pos | Team | Pld | W | D | L | GF | GA | GD | Pts | Final result |
|---|---|---|---|---|---|---|---|---|---|---|
| 1 | Spain | 5 | 5 | 0 | 0 | 19 | 5 | +14 | 15 | Champions |
| 2 | Ukraine | 5 | 2 | 1 | 2 | 18 | 12 | +6 | 7 | Runners-up |
| 3 | Russia | 5 | 3 | 0 | 2 | 14 | 9 | +5 | 9 | Third place |
| 4 | Italy | 5 | 3 | 1 | 1 | 18 | 12 | +6 | 10 | Fourth place |
| 5 | Croatia | 3 | 1 | 0 | 2 | 2 | 9 | -7 | 3 | Eliminated in Group stage |
| 6 | Czech Republic | 3 | 0 | 1 | 2 | 9 | 13 | -4 | 1 | Eliminated in Group stage |
| 7 | Netherlands | 3 | 0 | 1 | 2 | 3 | 11 | -8 | 1 | Eliminated in Group stage |
| 8 | Poland | 3 | 0 | 0 | 3 | 6 | 18 | -12 | 0 | Eliminated in Group stage |
