= Dmitri Chugunov =

Russian footballer (born 1968)

Personal information
- Full name: Dmitri Vyacheslavovich Chugunov
- Date of birth: 9 June 1968 (age 58)
- Place of birth: Moscow, Russian SFSR
- Height: 1.70 m (5 ft 7 in)
- Position: Defender

Senior career*
Years	Team	Apps	(Gls)
1985–1990	FC Torpedo Moscow	22	(1)
1991	FC Lokomotiv Moscow	8	(0)
1991	FC Shinnik Yaroslavl	10	(0)
1992	FC Torpedo Moscow	0	(0)
1992	TP-55	6	(1)
1993–1995	Sepsi-78 Seinäjoki		
2008	FC Stroymekhanizatsiya-1 Moscow		
- * Club domestic league appearances and goals

Dmitri Vyacheslavovich Chugunov (Russian: Дмитрий Вячеславович Чугунов; born 9 June 1968) is a former Russian professional footballer.

== Club career ==
He made his professional debut in the Soviet Top League in 1986 for FC Torpedo Moscow.

From 1992 to 2005 he was a professional futsal player.

== Honours ==
- Soviet Top League bronze: 1988.
- Soviet Cup finalist: 1988.

== European club competitions ==
With FC Torpedo Moscow.

- UEFA Cup Winners' Cup 1986–87: 2 games.
- UEFA Cup Winners' Cup 1989–90: 3 games, 1 goal.
