= MFK Zarya Yakutsk =

Russian futsal club

Zarya Yakutsk
- Full name: Mini-Futbol'nyy Klub Zarya Yakutsk
- Founded: 1997; 28 years ago
- Ground: 50 age Victory Day
- League: High League
- 2015-16: RFHL, 3rd
Home colours	Away colours

Zarya Yakutsk (Заря Якутск in Russian) was a futsal club based in Yakutsk, Russia. The club was founded in 1997, and last competed in the Russian Futsal High League.

== Season to season ==
Season	Tier	Division	Place	Playoffs	National cup
1997–98	2	First League. Division A	8th		
1998–99	2	First League. Division A	10th		
1999–2000	2	First League. Division A	9th		Group stage (4th)
2000–01	2	First League. Division A	9th		Group stage (7th)
2001–02	2	First League. Division A	8th		2nd group stage (3rd)
2002–03	2	First League. Division A	3rd		2nd group stage (3rd)
2003–04	2	High League	7th		1st group stage (4th)
2004–05	2	High League	15th		1st group stage (4th)
2005–06	2	High League	12th	—	1st group stage (2nd)
2006–07	2	High League	8th	—	Group stage (3rd)
2007–08	2	High League	3rd	4th	Group stage (2nd)
2008–09	2	High League	15th	—	2nd group stage (4th)
2009–10	2	High League	5th		1/8
2010–11	2	High League	2nd		Group stage (4th)
2011–12	2	High League	6th		Group stage (4th)
2012–13	2	High League	4th	1/4	Group stage (3rd)
2013–14	2	High League	5th	4th	1/8
2014–15	2	High League	5th	1/4	Group stage (3rd)
2015–16	2	High League. Division Center	3rd		1/8
