= Netherlands national futsal team =

Netherlands
- Shirt badge/Association crest
- Nickname(s): Oranje; Holland; The Flying Dutchmen; A Clockwork Orange; La Machina Naranja
- Association: Royal Dutch Football Association
- Confederation: UEFA (Europe)
- Head coach: (Spain) Miguel Andrés Moreno
- FIFA code: NED
- FIFA ranking: 32 ▼3 (8 May 2026)
Home colours	Away colours

First international
- Belgium 7–2 Netherlands (Genk, Belgium; 22 April 1977)

Biggest win
- Netherlands 13–0 Estonia (Visoko, Bosnia and Herzegovina; 28 February 2008)

Biggest defeat
- Spain 10–0 Netherlands (8 September 2024)

FIFA World Cup
- Appearances: 5 (First in 1989)
- Best result: (silver) Runners-up (1989)

AMF World Cup
- Appearances: 3 (First in 1982)
- Best result: Second round (1988)

European Championship
- Appearances: 6 (First in 1996)
- Best result: 4th place (1999)

Grand Prix de Futsal
- Appearances: 3 (First in 2007)
- Best result: 9th place (2011)

The Netherlands national futsal team is the national team of the Netherlands. It is governed by the Royal Dutch Football Association (KNVB). The Netherlands organized the first FIFA Futsal World Championship in 1989 in Rotterdam, where they finished in second place after being beaten by Brazil 2–1 in the final.

== Tournament records ==
=== FIFA Futsal World Cup ===
FIFA Futsal World Cup record								Qualification record					
Year	Round	Pld	W	D*	L	GF	GA	Pld	W	D	L	GF	GA
(Netherlands) 1989	Runners-up	8	4	2	2	21	14	Qualified as invitee and host					
(Hong Kong) 1992	Second Round	6	3	1	2	15	15	4	3	1	0	14	4
(Spain) 1996	Second Round	6	2	2	2	23	20	Qualified from participation in Euro 1996					
(Guatemala) 2000	Second Round	6	3	0	3	17	20	4	4	0	0	23	7
(Chinese Taipei) 2004	did not qualify							2	0	1	1	6	9
(Brazil) 2008	did not qualify							3	1	1	1	18	8
(Thailand) 2012	did not qualify							3	1	0	2	5	10
(Colombia) 2016	did not qualify							5	2	1	2	13	21
(Lithuania) 2021	did not qualify							6	3	2	1	19	14
(Uzbekistan) 2024	Round of 16	4	1	2	1	11	10	14	8	6	5	30	30
Total	5/10	30	11	7	10	87	79	41	18	11	12	128	102

=== UEFA European Futsal Championship ===
UEFA European Futsal Championship record								Qualification record					
Year	Round	Pld	W	D*	L	GF	GA	Pld	W	D	L	GF	GA
(Spain) 1996	6th Place	3	0	1	2	5	8	5	4	1	0	21	13
(Spain) 1999	4th Place	5	1	1	3	16	19	2	2	0	0	17	1
(Russia) 2001	First Round	3	0	1	2	3	11	3	2	1	0	12	4
(Italy) 2003	did not qualify							3	2	0	1	11	12
(Czech Republic) 2005	First Round	3	1	0	2	8	12	3	3	0	0	24	3
(Portugal) 2007	did not qualify							3	1	1	1	6	11
(Hungary) 2010	did not qualify							3	1	0	2	11	9
(Croatia) 2012	did not qualify							3	1	1	1	8	7
(Belgium) 2014	1st round	2	0	0	2	1	12	5	3	0	2	14	13
(Serbia) 2016	did not qualify							3	0	1	2	4	8
(Slovenia) 2018	did not qualify							3	0	2	1	6	8
(Netherlands) 2022	1st round	3	1	0	2	6	9	Qualified as Host					
(Latvia) (Lithuania) (Slovenia) 2026	Did not qualify							6	2	2	2	19	17
Total	6/13	19	3	3	13	39	71	42	21	9	12	153	106

=== Grand Prix de Futsal ===
Grand Prix de Futsal Record
Year	Round	Pld	W	D	L	GS	GA
Brazil 2005	did not enter						
Brazil 2006	did not enter						
Brazil 2007	10th Place	3	0	3	0	6	6
Brazil 2008	did not enter						
Brazil 2009	did not enter						
Brazil 2010	13th Place	6	3	0	3	22	16
Brazil 2011	9th Place	6	4	0	2	22	19
Brazil 2013	did not enter						
Brazil 2014	did not enter						
Brazil 2015	did not enter						
Brazil 2018	did not enter						
Total	3/11	15	7	3	5	50	41

== Honours ==
- 1989 FIFA Futsal World Championship: (silver) 2nd
- 2006 Edegem 4 Nations Futsal Tournament: (gold) 1st

== Players ==
=== Current squad ===
The following players were called up to the squad for the UEFA 2024 FIFA Futsal World Cup qualification matches against Kazakhstan and Azerbaijan on 15 and 20 September 2023, respectively.
Caps and goals are correct as of 21 September 2023.
Head coach: Miguel Andrés Moreno

No.	Pos.	Player	Date of birth (age)	Caps	Goals	Club
1	GK	Manuel Kuijk (captain)	13 October 1994 (age 31)	58	1	(Royal Dutch Football Association) FC Eindhoven
12	GK	David Stet	3 February 1990 (age 36)	8	0	(Royal Dutch Football Association) Hovocubo
2	DF	Yordi Orriëns	28 July 1994 (age 32)	3	0	(Royal Dutch Football Association) ZVV Ede
4	DF	Tevfik Ceyar	2 May 1990 (age 36)	46	12	(Royal Dutch Football Association) FC Eindhoven
6	DF	Saber Ben Khalou	24 July 2001 (age 25)	12	3	(Royal Dutch Football Association) Os Lusitanos
10	DF	Abdessamad Attahiri	19 December 1994 (age 31)	26	4	(Royal Dutch Football Association) Hovocubo
11	DF	Lahcen Bouyouzan	17 April 1993 (age 33)	73	15	(Royal Dutch Football Association) Hovocubo
20	DF	Mohamed Chih	12 August 1999 (age 26)	9	1	(Royal Dutch Football Association) Os Lusitanos
5	FW	Said Bouzambou	9 February 1990 (age 36)	78	29	(Royal Dutch Football Association) FC Eindhoven
7	FW	Denzel Van Houtum	12 December 2000 (age 25)	4	2	(Royal Dutch Football Association) FC Eindhoven
8	FW	Ayoub Boukhari	6 May 1997 (age 29)	10	6	(Royal Dutch Football Association) FC Eindhoven
14	FW	Iliass Bouzit	7 April 1995 (age 31)	32	9	(Royal Dutch Football Association) Os Lusitanos
15	FW	Ismaïl Ouaddouh	14 November 1994 (age 31)	3	1	(Royal Belgian Football Association) Celtic FD Visé
18	FW	Gianni Tiebosch	11 November 1996 (age 29)	3	2	(Royal Dutch Football Association) FCK De Hommel

=== Recent call-ups ===
The following players have also been called up to the squad within the last 12 months.

Pos.	Player	Date of birth (age)	Caps	Goals	Club	Latest call-up
GK	Mika Spigt	10 September 2005 (age 20)	1	0	(Netherlands) FC Marlène	v. Saudi Arabia, 3 September 2023
DF	Ayoub El Boubsi	28 February 2004 (age 22)	1	0	(Netherlands) Os Lusitanos	v. Saudi Arabia, 3 September 2023
DF	Issam Dahmani	15 October 1996 (age 29)	6	3	(Belgium) Real Elmos Herentals	v. Saudi Arabia, 2 September 2023
DF	Ayoub Tamoukh	22 February 1992 (age 34)	0	0	(Netherlands) Tigers Roermond	v. Saudi Arabia, 2 September 2023^{PRE}
DF	Ferd Pasaribu	22 June 1991 (age 35)	4	2	(Netherlands) Tigers Roermond	v. Moldova, 19 April 2023
DF	Mats Velseboer	13 September 1993 (age 32)	95	29	(Netherlands) Hovocubo	v. Moldova, 19 April 2023
DF	Aimane M'Rabet-Eloued	11 December 1996 (age 29)	1	0	(Netherlands) Tigers Roermond	v. Ukraine, 8 March 2023
FW	Aboubakr Ouaddouh	23 April 1997 (age 29)	1	0	(Belgium) Celtic FD Visé	v. Saudi Arabia, 3 September 2023
FW	Oualid Tarifit	23 August 1998 (age 27)	8	1	(Netherlands) ZVG/Cagemax	v. Saudi Arabia, 2 September 2023
FW	Soeremly Te Vrede	31 October 1994 (age 31)	5	0	(Netherlands) Os Lusitanos	v. Moldova, 19 April 2023
FW	Jasko Džurlić	8 February 1998 (age 28)	6	0	(Netherlands) Tigers Roermond	v. Kosovo, 3 March 2023
^{COV} Player withdrew from the squad due to contracting COVID-19.^{INJ} Player withdrew from the squad due to an injury.^{PRE} Preliminary squad.^{RET} Retired from international futsal.
