= Konstantin Yeryomenko =

Russian footballer

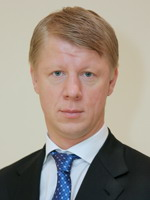
- Yeryomenko in 2008

Personal information
- Full name: Konstantin Viktorovich Yeryomenko
- Date of birth: 5 August 1970
- Place of birth: Dnipropetrovsk, USSR
- Date of death: 18 March 2010 (aged 39)
- Place of death: Moscow, Russia
- Height: 1.90 m (6 ft 3 in)
- Position: Pivot

Senior career*
Years	Team	Apps	(Gls)
1988	Dnipro Dnipropetrovsk	1	(0)
1989	Selenga Ulan-Ude	2	(0)
1990	Traktor Pavlodar	18	(3)
1990	Alga Bishkek	8	(1)
1990	Mehanizator Dnipropetrovsk (futsal)	10	(14)
1991–2001	Dina Moscow (futsal)	235	(533)

International career
1992–2001	Russia (futsal)	66	(122)
Medal record
Representing Russia
Men's Futsal
FIFA Futsal World Cup
Third place	1996 Spain
UEFA Futsal Championship
Runner-up	1996 Córdoba
Winner	1999 Granada
Third place	2001 Moscow
- * Club domestic league appearances and goals

Konstantin Viktorovich Yeryomenko, often transliterated as Eremenko (Russian: Константин Викторович Ерёменко; 5 August 1970 – 18 March 2010) was a Russian futsal player who was named the greatest futsal player of the 20th century.

== Career ==
Yeryomenko played 11-a-side football in his youth, but began to play futsal in 1990. He played for Dina Moscow for 10 years, during which time he also became the all-time top scorer of the Russian national team. He became a key player in Russia's 1999 UEFA Futsal Championship triumph, scoring the winning penalty in a shoot-out against hosts Spain. He was recognised by many as the greatest Russian futsal player of all time and throughout the futsal community as one of the game's legends.

After retiring from futsal in 2001, Yeryomenko went on to become president of Dinamo Moscow in 2002 and in 2003, he was elected as the first president of the Russian Futsal Super League.

In 2004, Yeryomenko became a member of the Federation Council of Russia for the Voronezh Region, replacing Gleb Fetisov. The place of Yeryomenko in 2011 was taken by Nikolay Olshansky.

== Death ==
Konstantin Yeryomenko died from a heart attack while playing in a kickabout match. Despite having a history of heart problems, which were instrumental in his decision to retire from futsal and also necessitated surgery at the height of his playing career, he chose to defy doctors' orders and continued to play. He is buried in Moscow's Troyekurovskoye Cemetery.

== Honours ==
=== Club ===
- CIS Futsal League: 1992
- Russian Futsal Super League (8): 1992/93, 1993/94, 1994/95, 1995/96, 1996/97, 1997/98, 1998/99, 1999/00
- USSR Futsal Cup: 1990
- Russian Futsal Cup (7): 1992, 1993, 1995, 1996, 1997, 1998, 1999
- UEFA Futsal Champions League (3): 1995, 1997, 1999
- Intercontinental Futsal Cup: 1997
- Legends Cup: 2009

=== International ===
- FIFA Futsal World Championship third place: 1996
- UEFA Futsal Championship winner: 1999
- UEFA Futsal Championship runner-up: 1996
- UEFA Futsal Championship third place: 2001

=== Individual ===
- Best Russian futsal player (7): 1992–1998
- 1132 goals scored in official games
- Dina Moscow all-time top scorer (972)
- Russian national team all-time top scorer (122)
- Russian Futsal Super League all-time top scorer (533)
- Russian Futsal Cup all-time top scorer (210)
- Russian Top League Cup all-time top scorer (46)
- UEFA Futsal Champions League and Intercontinental Futsal Cup all-time top scorer (61)
- FIFA Futsal World Championship Silver Shoe: 1992
- UEFA Futsal Championship Golden Shoe: 1996, 1999
- UEFA Futsal Championship Best Player: 1999
