= MFK CSKA Moscow =

Russian futsal club

MFK CSKA Moskva
- Full name: MFK CSKA Moskva
- Founded: 1996
- Dissolved: 2012
- Ground: USH CSKA, Moscow, Russia
- Capacity: 5500
- Chairman: (Russia) Oleg Tabunov
- Manager: (Russia) Ilya Shorkin
Home colours	Away colours

MFK CSKA Moskva is a Russian futsal club based in Moscow, part of multi-sport club CSKA Moscow. The club was founded in 1996 under the name Bolear-MGAFK. In 1997, the team was renamed to CSKA-Bolear. The following season, they qualified to the top division of the Russian championship (currently known as Super League). After that, the club was renamed to CSKA. The team's best result: 5th place in the 2007-08 and 2009-10 seasons, as well as 1/4 finals in four cases when the championships was held with the play-off system.

In 2012, the club lost its professional status, and since then has been participating in the Moscow Championship.
