= AS Roma Futsal =

Italian futsal club

Roma
- Full name: AS Roma Futsal
- Founded: 2004
- Ground: PalaCesaroni di Genzano di Roma, Rome, Italy
- Capacity: 2000
- Chairman: ?
- Manager: ?
- League: Serie B (Futsal)
Home colours	Away colours

AS Roma Futsal is a futsal club based in Rome, Italy.

In the year 2004 Roma RCB and Gruppo Sportivo BNL merged in AS Roma Futsal

== Honours ==
=== Roma RCB ===
- Campionati italiani: 5
  - 87/88 - 88/89 - 89/90 - 90/91 - 2000/01 -
- Coppa Italia: 2
  - 1989 - 1990
- European Champions Tournament: 1
  - 1990
- Torneo Internazionale di Angers: 1
  - 2004

==== Giovanili ====
- Campionati italiani Juniores: 2
  - 1997 - 1998

1 coppa lazio 2003 1 campionato regionale 2004

=== Gruppo Sportivo BNL ===
- Campionati italiani: 4
  - 91/92 - 94/95 - 95/96 - 96/97
- European Champions Tournament: 1
  - 1996

==== Giovanili ====
- Coppa Italia Under 21: 1
  - 2004
- Campionati italiani Juniores: 1
  - 1992
