= MFK Dina Moskva =

Russian futsal club

ISC Dina Moscow
- Full name: Imperial Sport Club Dina
- Founded: 1991
- Ground: DS Kvant, Troitsk, Moscow, Russian Federation
- Capacity: 1,000
- Manager: Victor Zverev, Vyacheslav Tochilin
- League: Moscow Oblast Championship
- 2019–20: 4th
Home colours	Away colours

Imperial Sport Club Dina Moscow is a futsal club based in Moscow, playing their home games in Troitsk.

== History ==
=== Russia ===
In its first season, Dina is becoming CIS championship winner. After that Dina won all Russian championship titles till 2001. In 2000s Dina had lack of success. The main records are 1st place in regular Russian championship (2001/02), silver medals of Russian championship (2003/04) and Russian Cup final (in 2001 and 2002).

In 2009/10 Dina showed the worst result in its history at that time – 9th place. However, next season Dina's result was even worse – 10th place (penultimate place in the table). In 2013/14 Dina occupied the third place in the regular championship. In the play-off, the club beat Sinara (Ekaterinburg), Sibiryak (Novosibirsk) and Gazprom-Yugra (Yugorsk), becoming Russian champions for the first time in 14 years. In 2017 Dina won Russian Cup - 18 years after the last victory.

=== International area ===
Dina made its debut in Futsal European Clubs Championship in 1993/94. Moscow side didn't qualify to final. Dina did it the next year and won Spanish Maspalomas Sol Europa. After that Dina got two titles of the best team in Europe: in 1996/97 (opponent in the final was Italian BNL Calcetto) and in 1998/99 (they beat Lazio in the final).

Dina organized five tournaments of the International Futsal Cup, which were held in Moscow from 1997 to 2001. The Moscow club won the first one.

In 2014/15, Dina qualified for the Final Four of UEFA Futsal Cup, held in Lisbon from 24 to 26 April.

== Achievements ==
=== Domestic competitions ===
- Russian Champions (9): 1992/93, 1993/94, 1994/95, 1995/96, 1996/97, 1997/98, 1998/99, 1999/2000, 2013/2014
- CIS Champions (1): 1991/1992
- Russian Cup winners (8): 1992, 1993, 1995, 1996, 1997, 1998, 1999, 2017
- League Cup winners (2): 1993, 1995

=== International competitions ===
- Futsal European Clubs Championship winners (3): 1995, 1997, 1999
  - Futsal European Clubs Championship runners-up (2): 1998, 2001
- Intercontinental Cup winners (1): 1997

== Famous players ==
- (Russia) Dmitri Chugunov
- (Russia) Boris Chukhlov
- (Russia) Aleksandr Fukin
- (Ukraine) Sergey Koridze
- (Russia) Oleg Solodovnik
- (Russia) Alexey Stepanov
- (Russia) Konstantin Yeryomenko
- (Serbia) Marko Perić
- (Russia) Roman Glavatskikh
