= 2021 FIFA Futsal World Cup squads =

List of the national futsal squads that take part in the 2021 FIFA Futsal World Cup

The 2021 FIFA Futsal World Cup was an international futsal tournament held in Lithuania from September 12 to October 3, 2021. The 24 participating national teams were required by FIFA to register a squad of 16 players, including three goalkeepers. However, each team can only use 14 players per match.

This article lists the national futsal squads that participated in the tournament. The age listed for each player is as of September 12, 2021, the first day of the tournament. The names of the players are those of the FIFA Display Names listed on the official squad document issued by FIFA.

== Group A ==
=== Costa Rica ===
Head coach: Carlos Quirós

| No. | Pos. | Player | Date of birth (age) | Caps | Club |
|---|---|---|---|---|---|
| 1 | GK | César Vargas | 15 February 1998 (aged 23) | | (Costa Rica) AD Borussia |
| 2 | MF | José Guevara | 16 March 1991 (aged 30) | | (Costa Rica) CDI Orotinense SAD |
| 3 | MF | Daniel Gómez | 8 July 1994 (aged 27) | | (Costa Rica) CDI Orotinense SAD |
| 4 | FW | Diego Vargas | 21 December 1991 (aged 29) | | (Costa Rica) AD Esparza |
| 5 | DF | Jean Carlo Salas | 4 July 1998 (aged 23) | | (Costa Rica) AD Borussia |
| 6 | DF | Víctor Fonseca | 16 November 1992 (aged 28) | | (Costa Rica) RS Hatillo |
| 7 | DF | Gilberth Garro (captain) | 26 November 1990 (aged 30) | | (Costa Rica) RS Hatillo |
| 8 | MF | Juan Cordero | 29 May 1988 (aged 33) | | (Costa Rica) RS Hatillo |
| 9 | FW | Minor Cabalceta | 24 May 1994 (aged 27) | | (Poland) BSF Bochnia |
| 10 | DF | Edwin Cubillo | 23 August 1987 (aged 34) | | (Costa Rica) AD Borussia |
| 11 | MF | Milinton Tijerino | 26 September 1997 (aged 23) | | (Poland) BSF Bochnia |
| 12 | MF | Diego Zúñiga | 11 July 1990 (aged 31) | | (Costa Rica) RS Hatillo |
| 13 | GK | Jairo Toruño | 22 November 1983 (aged 37) | | (Costa Rica) RS Hatillo |
| 14 | GK | Álvaro Santamaria | 1 April 1988 (aged 33) | | (Costa Rica) RS Hatillo |
| 15 | MF | Pablo Rodríguez | 15 May 1998 (aged 23) | | (Costa Rica) RS Hatillo |
| 16 | FW | Enmanuel Gamboa | 24 July 1999 (aged 22) | | (Costa Rica) AE Paraíso |

=== Kazakhstan ===
Head coach: (Brazil) Paulo Ricardo Kaká

| No. | Pos. | Player | Date of birth (age) | Caps | Club |
|---|---|---|---|---|---|
| 1 | GK | Rauan Atantayev | 22 September 1990 (aged 30) | | (Kazakhstan) MFC Atyrau |
| 2 | GK | Leo Higuita (captain) | 6 June 1986 (aged 35) | | (Kazakhstan) AFC Kairat |
| 3 | FW | Taynan | 12 February 1993 (aged 28) | | (Spain) ElPozo Murcia |
| 4 | MF | Nurbek Karagulov | 14 October 1992 (aged 28) | | (Kazakhstan) MFC Aktobe |
| 5 | DF | Dauren Nurgozhin | 21 May 1990 (aged 31) | | (Kazakhstan) AFC Kairat |
| 6 | DF | Agedil Madiyarov | 3 November 1995 (aged 25) | | (Russia) MFK Lipetsk |
| 7 | FW | Azat Valiullin | 5 May 1992 (aged 29) | | (Russia) MFK Ukhta |
| 8 | MF | Birzhan Orazov | 17 October 1994 (aged 26) | | (Kazakhstan) AFC Kairat |
| 9 | FW | Albert Akbalikov | 5 January 1995 (aged 26) | | (Kazakhstan) AFC Kairat |
| 10 | MF | Chingiz Yesenamanov | 10 March 1989 (aged 32) | | (Kazakhstan) AFC Kairat |
| 11 | DF | Arnold Knaub | 16 January 1995 (aged 26) | | (Kazakhstan) MFC Aktobe |
| 12 | FW | Dauren Tursagulov | 16 January 1996 (aged 25) | | (Kazakhstan) AFC Kairat |
| 13 | MF | Zhomart Tokayev | 10 December 1999 (aged 21) | | (Kazakhstan) MFC Atyrau |
| 14 | FW | Douglas Júnior | 15 October 1988 (aged 32) | | (Kazakhstan) AFC Kairat |
| 15 | DF | Bolat Sarbassov | 30 October 1997 (aged 23) | | (Kazakhstan) MFC Atyrau |
| 16 | GK | Narun Serikov | 30 September 2001 (aged 19) | | (Kazakhstan) AFC Kairat |

=== Lithuania ===
Head coach: (Ukraine) Yevhen Ryvkin

| No. | Pos. | Player | Date of birth (age) | Caps | Club |
|---|---|---|---|---|---|
| 1 | GK | Laurynas Glinskis | 4 April 2001 (aged 20) | | (England) Manchester Futsal Club |
| 2 | GK | Egidijus Žagaras | 18 January 1994 (aged 27) | | (Lithuania) Jonavos Vikingai |
| 3 | DF | Arsenij Buinickij | 10 October 1985 (aged 35) | | (Lithuania) Jonavos Vikingai |
| 4 | DF | Andrius Kaulinis | 1 December 2000 (aged 20) | | (Lithuania) FC Turbotransfers |
| 5 | DF | Vladimir Derendiajev | 31 May 1990 (aged 31) | | (Lithuania) Jonavos Vikingai |
| 6 | DF | Tomas Bučma | 27 January 1994 (aged 27) | | (Lithuania) FK Kauno Žalgiris |
| 7 | MF | Benas Spietinis | 15 February 1996 (aged 25) | | (Lithuania) Jonavos Vikingai |
| 8 | MF | Albert Voskunovič | 8 December 1998 (aged 22) | | (Lithuania) FK Kauno Žalgiris |
| 9 | FW | Justinas Zagurskas (captain) | 9 October 1995 (aged 25) | | (Lithuania) FK Kauno Žalgiris |
| 10 | FW | Lukas Sendžikas | 28 November 1992 (aged 28) | | (Lithuania) FK Kauno Žalgiris |
| 11 | FW | Edgaras Baranauskas | 12 March 1993 (aged 28) | | (Lithuania) FK Mažeikių VIP |
| 12 | GK | Ernestas Macenis | 3 May 1997 (aged 24) | | (Lithuania) FK Kauno Žalgiris |
| 13 | MF | Genaras Samsonik | 16 December 2000 (aged 20) | | (Lithuania) Jonavos Vikingai |
| 14 | MF | Paulius Osauskas | 17 May 1994 (aged 27) | | (Lithuania) Jonavos Vikingai |
| 15 | FW | Deividas Reimaris | 13 September 1997 (aged 23) | | (Lithuania) FK Kauno Žalgiris |
| 16 | MF | Artūr Juchno | 27 May 1992 (aged 29) | | (Lithuania) FK Kauno Žalgiris |

=== Venezuela ===
Head coach: Freddy González

| No. | Pos. | Player | Date of birth (age) | Caps | Club |
|---|---|---|---|---|---|
| 1 | GK | Jhonny Rueda | 12 October 1988 (aged 32) | 71 | (Spain) CSF Montsant |
| 2 | DF | Carlos Sanz | 21 March 1996 (aged 25) | 32 | (Italy) Meta Catania |
| 3 | FW | Wilmer Cabarcas | 15 September 1994 (aged 26) | 10 | (Venezuela) Delta Te Quiero |
| 4 | DF | Greydelvid Terán | 24 November 1991 (aged 29) | 34 | (Venezuela) La Fría del Sur |
| 5 | DF | Henry Gutiérrez | 10 May 1997 (aged 24) | 22 | (Finland) FC Kemi |
| 6 | DF | Carlos Polo | 26 March 1992 (aged 29) | 12 | (Venezuela) Delta Te Quiero |
| 7 | MF | Jesús Viamonte | 9 April 1997 (aged 24) | 32 | (Venezuela) La Fría del Sur |
| 8 | MF | Enderson Suárez | 9 April 1993 (aged 28) | 10 | (Finland) FC Kemi |
| 9 | FW | Carlos Vento | 27 February 1997 (aged 24) | 22 | (Uruguay) Peñarol |
| 10 | FW | Wilson Francia | 25 May 1996 (aged 25) | 31 | (Venezuela) Bucaneros de La Guaira |
| 11 | MF | Alfredo Vidal | 3 February 1994 (aged 27) | 30 | (Peru) Panta Walon |
| 12 | GK | José Villalobos (captain) | 26 November 1991 (aged 29) | 55 | (Venezuela) Delta Te Quiero |
| 13 | MF | Milton Francia | 18 December 1994 (aged 26) | 27 | (Venezuela) Pumas de Vargas |
| 14 | FW | Rafael Morillo | 20 October 1992 (aged 28) | 21 | (Italy) Città di Mestre |
| 15 | GK | Freddy Chacín | 6 December 1991 (aged 29) | 6 | (Portugal) Macedense |
| 16 | MF | Andrés Terán | 20 April 1998 (aged 23) | 13 | (Argentina) Barracas Central |

== Group B ==
=== Egypt ===
Head coach: Gehad El-Sayed

| No. | Pos. | Player | Date of birth (age) | Caps | Club |
|---|---|---|---|---|---|
| 1 | GK | Gamal Abdel-Naser | 20 January 1993 (aged 28) | | (Egypt) El Alamein FC |
| 2 | GK | Shober | 26 March 1994 (aged 27) | | (Egypt) El Alamein FC |
| 3 | FW | Abdelrahman El-Ashwal | 25 December 1993 (aged 27) | | (Iraq) Al-Shorta SC |
| 4 | MF | Dunga | 29 May 1999 (aged 22) | | (Egypt) El Minya SC |
| 5 | FW | Abdelrahman Body | 6 September 1992 (aged 29) | | (Egypt) El Shorta SC |
| 6 | MF | Mohamed Ahmed | 28 October 1987 (aged 33) | | (Egypt) Bank El Ahly SC |
| 7 | MF | Mohamed Mansour | 11 January 1992 (aged 29) | | (Egypt) Bank El Ahly SC |
| 8 | MF | Ali Ramadan | 13 June 1994 (aged 27) | | (Egypt) Misr El-Makasa SC |
| 9 | MF | Tarek Shoola | 12 June 1996 (aged 25) | | (Egypt) Ismaily SC |
| 10 | MF | Essam Alla | 1 September 1994 (aged 27) | | (United Arab Emirates) Khor Fakkan Club |
| 11 | MF | Mohamed Saeed | 30 September 1995 (aged 25) | | (Egypt) Mostaqbal Watan |
| 12 | DF | Mostafa Eid (captain) | 17 August 1992 (aged 29) | | (Saudi Arabia) Al Rayyan |
| 13 | FW | Salah Hosny | 6 August 1990 (aged 31) | | (Egypt) El Shorta SC |
| 14 | FW | Koki | 25 November 1994 (aged 26) | | (Saudi Arabia) Tuwek Club |
| 15 | MF | Khaled Yousry | 17 January 1999 (aged 22) | | (Egypt) El Minya SC |
| 16 | GK | Ahmed Fikry | 27 December 1994 (aged 26) | | (Egypt) Ismaily SC |

=== Guatemala ===
Head coach: Estuardo De León

| No. | Pos. | Player | Date of birth (age) | Caps | Club |
|---|---|---|---|---|---|
| 1 | GK | Lester Arevalo | 9 March 1996 (aged 25) | | (Guatemala) CFSC Legendarios |
| 2 | GK | William Ramírez | 2 February 1980 (aged 41) | | (Guatemala) Glucosoral FSC |
| 3 | MF | Pablo Morán | 7 May 1996 (aged 25) | | (Guatemala) Farmacéuticos FSC |
| 4 | DF | José González | 10 December 1986 (aged 34) | | (Guatemala) Glucosoral FSC |
| 5 | DF | Edgar Santizo | 2 February 1987 (aged 34) | | (Guatemala) CSD Tellioz |
| 6 | DF | Alexander Alay | 11 February 1988 (aged 33) | | (Guatemala) Glucosoral FSC |
| 7 | FW | José Mansilla | 19 November 1988 (aged 32) | | (Guatemala) Glucosoral FSC |
| 8 | MF | Román Alvarado | 2 December 1997 (aged 23) | | (Guatemala) Glucosoral FSC |
| 9 | FW | Walter Enríquez | 13 March 1988 (aged 33) | | (Guatemala) Glucosoral FSC |
| 10 | MF | Marvin Sandoval | 22 March 1989 (aged 32) | | (Guatemala) Glucosoral FSC |
| 11 | MF | Alan Aguilar (captain) | 2 December 1989 (aged 31) | | (Guatemala) Glucosoral FSC |
| 12 | GK | José Reyes | 20 November 1995 (aged 25) | | (Guatemala) CSD Tellioz |
| 13 | MF | Jonatan Arévalo | 24 February 1993 (aged 28) | | (Guatemala) FSC Legendarios |
| 14 | MF | Wanderley Ruiz | 9 August 1995 (aged 26) | | (Guatemala) FSC Legendarios |
| 15 | MF | Patrick Ruiz | 10 January 1993 (aged 28) | | (Guatemala) FSC Legendarios |
| 16 | FW | Fernando Campaignac | 13 June 1994 (aged 27) | | (Guatemala) Glucosoral FSC |

=== RFU ===
Head coach: Sergei Skorovich

| No. | Pos. | Player | Date of birth (age) | Caps | Club |
|---|---|---|---|---|---|
| 1 | GK | Georgi Zamtaradze | 12 February 1987 (aged 34) | | (Russia) MFK KPRF |
| 2 | GK | Albert Tsaider | 19 August 1996 (aged 25) | | (Russia) MFK KPRF |
| 3 | DF | Rômulo | 28 September 1986 (aged 34) | | (Russia) MFK KPRF |
| 4 | DF | Artem Antoshkin | 17 December 1993 (aged 27) | | (Russia) MFK Tyumen |
| 5 | DF | Ruslan Kudziev | 12 December 1995 (aged 25) | | (Russia) MFK Norilsk Nickel |
| 6 | MF | Yanar Asadov | 11 October 1995 (aged 25) | | (Russia) MFK KPRF |
| 7 | FW | Ivan Milovanov | 8 February 1989 (aged 32) | | (Russia) MFK Tyumen |
| 8 | FW | Éder Lima | 29 June 1984 (aged 37) | | (Brazil) Corinthians |
| 9 | FW | Sergei Abramov (captain) | 9 September 1990 (aged 31) | | (Russia) MFK Viz-Sinara Yekaterinburg |
| 10 | MF | Robinho | 28 January 1983 (aged 38) | | (Portugal) Benfica |
| 11 | MF | Artem Niyazov | 30 July 1996 (aged 25) | | (Russia) MFK KPRF |
| 12 | MF | Ivan Chishkala | 11 July 1995 (aged 26) | | (Portugal) Benfica |
| 13 | MF | Sergei Abramovich | 15 January 1990 (aged 31) | | (Russia) MFK Tyumen |
| 14 | MF | Daniil Davydov | 23 January 1989 (aged 32) | | (Russia) Gazprom-Ugra Yugorsk |
| 15 | DF | Andrei Afanasyev | 23 May 1986 (aged 35) | | (Russia) Gazprom-Ugra Yugorsk |
| 16 | GK | Dmitry Putilov | 5 December 1994 (aged 26) | | (Russia) MFK Viz-Sinara Yekaterinburg |

Note RUS: In accordance with the ban by the World Anti-Doping Agency and a December 2020 decision by the Court of Arbitration for Sport, the team from Russia participated in the 2021 FIFA Futsal World Cup as neutral athletes of the Russian Football Union (RFU), and used the flag of the Russian Olympic Committee.

=== Uzbekistan ===
Head coach: Bakhodir Akhmedov

| No. | Pos. | Player | Date of birth (age) | Caps | Club |
|---|---|---|---|---|---|
| 1 | GK | Rustam Umarov (captain) | 26 May 1984 (aged 37) | | (Uzbekistan) Almalyk MFK |
| 2 | DF | Anaskhon Rakhmatov | 20 June 1994 (aged 27) | | (Uzbekistan) Almalyk MFK |
| 3 | DF | Mashrab Adilov | 15 August 1994 (aged 27) | | (Uzbekistan) Pakhtakor Tashkent FK |
| 4 | FW | Ikhtiyor Ropiev | 19 September 1993 (aged 27) | | (Uzbekistan) Almalyk MFK |
| 5 | FW | Muzaffar Akhadjonov | 8 November 1997 (aged 23) | | (Uzbekistan) Almalyk MFK |
| 6 | DF | Ilkhomjon Khamroev | 25 September 1997 (aged 23) | | (Uzbekistan) Almalyk MFK |
| 7 | MF | Dilshod Rakhmatov | 4 December 1989 (aged 31) | | (Uzbekistan) Jizzakh Khuasin |
| 8 | MF | Khusniddin Nishonov | 19 May 1998 (aged 23) | | (Uzbekistan) Almalyk MFK |
| 9 | FW | Elbek Tulkinov | 24 December 2000 (aged 20) | | (Uzbekistan) Maxam Chirchik |
| 10 | FW | Davron Choriev | 1 January 1993 (aged 28) | | (Uzbekistan) Almalyk MFK |
| 11 | FW | Akbar Usmonov | 9 March 1997 (aged 24) | | (Uzbekistan) Pakhtakor Tashkent FK |
| 12 | GK | Ravshan Elibaev | 26 January 1987 (aged 34) | | (Uzbekistan) Pakhtakor Tashkent FK |
| 13 | DF | Shakhzodjon Sadiev | 21 September 2000 (aged 20) | | (Uzbekistan) Almalyk MFK |
| 14 | DF | Khushnur Erkinov | 7 May 1998 (aged 23) | | (Uzbekistan) PFK Metallurg Bekabad |
| 15 | MF | Sunatulla Juraev | 24 December 1994 (aged 26) | | (Uzbekistan) Pakhtakor Tashkent FK |
| 16 | GK | Abbos Elmurodov | 4 September 1998 (aged 23) | | (Uzbekistan) Jizzakh Khuasin |

== Group C ==
=== Morocco ===
Head coach: Hicham Dguig

| No. | Pos. | Player | Date of birth (age) | Caps | Club |
|---|---|---|---|---|---|
| 1 | GK | Abdelkrim Anbia | 8 April 1989 (aged 32) | | (Morocco) ASF Agadir |
| 2 | DF | Achraf Saoud | 21 June 1990 (aged 31) | | (Morocco) SCC Mohammédia |
| 3 | MF | Anas El Ayyane | 30 October 1992 (aged 28) | | (Italy) Ciampino Aniene |
| 4 | DF | Youssef Jouad | 30 December 1999 (aged 21) | | (Morocco) SCC Mohammédia |
| 5 | MF | Youssef El Mazray (captain) | 1 July 1987 (aged 34) | | (Morocco) SCC Mohammédia |
| 6 | DF | Soufiane Borite | 11 December 1992 (aged 28) | | (Morocco) SCC Mohammédia |
| 7 | MF | Ismail Amazal | 10 October 1996 (aged 24) | | (Morocco) ASF Agadir |
| 8 | MF | Saad Knia | 6 September 1987 (aged 34) | | (Morocco) SCC Mohammédia |
| 9 | FW | Otmane Boumezou | 8 July 1992 (aged 29) | | (Morocco) SCC Mohammédia |
| 10 | FW | Soufiane El Mesrar | 5 June 1990 (aged 31) | | (France) ACCS |
| 11 | DF | Bilal Bakkali | 24 February 1993 (aged 28) | | (France) ACCS |
| 12 | GK | Reda Khiyari | 21 May 1991 (aged 30) | | (Morocco) Dynamo Kénitra |
| 13 | MF | Hamza Bouyouzan | 11 July 1991 (aged 30) | | (Spain) Palma FS |
| 14 | MF | Idriss El Fenni | 9 May 1996 (aged 25) | | (Morocco) SCC Mohammédia |
| 15 | MF | Khalid Bouzid | 20 April 1998 (aged 23) | | (Spain) Industrias Santa Coloma |
| 16 | GK | Mohammed Cheridou | 20 September 1999 (aged 21) | | (Morocco) ASS Khabazat Oussoud Kénitra |

=== Portugal ===
Head coach: Jorge Braz

| No. | Pos. | Player | Date of birth (age) | Caps | Club |
|---|---|---|---|---|---|
| 1 | GK | Bebé | 19 May 1983 (aged 38) | | (Portugal) Leões Porto Salvo |
| 2 | MF | André Coelho | 30 October 1993 (aged 27) | | (Spain) FC Barcelona |
| 3 | DF | Tomás Paçó | 19 April 2000 (aged 21) | | (Portugal) Sporting CP |
| 4 | DF | Afonso Jesus | 6 January 1998 (aged 23) | | (Portugal) Benfica |
| 5 | DF | Fábio Cecílio | 30 April 1993 (aged 28) | | (Portugal) Braga/AAUM |
| 6 | FW | Zicky Té | 1 September 2001 (aged 20) | | (Portugal) Sporting CP |
| 7 | MF | Bruno Coelho | 1 August 1987 (aged 34) | | (Italy) Napoli |
| 8 | DF | Erick Mendonça | 21 July 1995 (aged 26) | | (Portugal) Sporting CP |
| 9 | FW | João Matos | 21 February 1987 (aged 34) | | (Portugal) Sporting CP |
| 10 | MF | Ricardinho (captain) | 3 September 1985 (aged 36) | | (France) ACCS |
| 11 | MF | Pany Varela | 25 February 1989 (aged 32) | | (Portugal) Sporting CP |
| 12 | GK | André Sousa | 25 February 1986 (aged 35) | | (Portugal) Benfica |
| 13 | MF | Tiago Brito | 22 July 1991 (aged 30) | | (Portugal) Braga/AAUM |
| 14 | MF | Miguel Ângelo | 2 February 1994 (aged 27) | | (Portugal) Sporting CP |
| 15 | MF | Pauleta | 12 June 1994 (aged 27) | | (Portugal) Sporting CP |
| 16 | GK | Vítor Hugo | 30 November 1982 (aged 38) | | (Portugal) Braga/AAUM |

=== Solomon Islands ===
Head coach: (Brazil) Vinícius Leite

| No. | Pos. | Player | Date of birth (age) | Caps | Club |
|---|---|---|---|---|---|
| 1 | GK | Anthony Talo | 8 January 1996 (aged 25) | | (Solomon Islands) Kooline FC |
| 2 | DF | Alwin Hou | 18 September 1996 (aged 24) | | (Solomon Islands) Marist FC |
| 3 | DF | Elliot Ragomo (captain) | 28 May 1991 (aged 30) | | (Solomon Islands) Marist FC |
| 4 | DF | George Stevenson | 7 January 1992 (aged 29) | | (Solomon Islands) Marist FC |
| 5 | MF | Marlon Sia | 19 July 1999 (aged 22) | | (Solomon Islands) Mataks FC |
| 6 | DF | Charlie Otainao | 5 June 1992 (aged 29) | | (Solomon Islands) Marist FC |
| 7 | MF | Alvin Ray | 23 January 1997 (aged 24) | | (Solomon Islands) Marist FC |
| 8 | MF | Jeffrey Bule | 15 November 1991 (aged 29) | | (Solomon Islands) Marist FC |
| 9 | FW | Micah Lea'alafa | 1 June 1991 (aged 30) | | (Solomon Islands) Waneagu United FC |
| 10 | FW | Samuel Osifelo | 15 March 1991 (aged 30) | | (Solomon Islands) Kossa FC |
| 11 | MF | Coleman Makau | 25 November 1992 (aged 28) | | (Solomon Islands) Kossa FC |
| 12 | MF | Arnold Maeluma | 9 December 1996 (aged 24) | | (Solomon Islands) Kooline FC |
| 13 | MF | Elis Mana | 9 March 2000 (aged 21) | | (Solomon Islands) Kooline FC |
| 14 | GK | Charlie Ata | 30 December 2000 (aged 20) | | (Solomon Islands) KF Gold |
| 15 | FW | Raphael Lea'i | 9 September 2003 (aged 18) | | (Solomon Islands) Henderson Eels FC |
| 16 | GK | Paul Laki | 25 July 1995 (aged 26) | | (Solomon Islands) Marist FC |

=== Thailand ===
Head coach: Rakphol Sainetngam

| No. | Pos. | Player | Date of birth (age) | Caps | Club |
|---|---|---|---|---|---|
| 1 | GK | Kanison Phoopun | 11 November 1991 (aged 29) | | (Thailand) Port |
| 2 | GK | Arut Senbat | 26 November 1988 (aged 32) | | (Thailand) Chonburi Blue Wave |
| 3 | MF | Worasak Srirangpirot | 26 December 1992 (aged 28) | | (Thailand) Port |
| 4 | DF | Pornmongkol Srisubseang | 15 May 1991 (aged 30) | | (Thailand) Port |
| 5 | DF | Ronnachai Jungwongsuk | 4 March 1997 (aged 24) | | (Thailand) Chonburi Blue Wave |
| 6 | DF | Jirawat Sornwichian | 25 October 1988 (aged 32) | | (Thailand) Blackpearl Futsal |
| 7 | MF | Kritsada Wongkaeo (captain) | 29 April 1988 (aged 33) | | (Thailand) Chonburi Blue Wave |
| 8 | MF | Jetsada Chudech | 20 February 1989 (aged 32) | | (Thailand) Rajnavy |
| 9 | FW | Suphawut Thueanklang | 14 July 1989 (aged 32) | | (Japan) Nagoya Oceans |
| 10 | FW | Warut Wangsama-aeo | 12 December 1992 (aged 28) | | (Thailand) Chonburi Blue Wave |
| 11 | FW | Muhammad Osamanmusa | 19 January 1998 (aged 23) | | (Thailand) Chonburi Blue Wave |
| 12 | GK | Katawut Hankampa | 27 May 1992 (aged 29) | | (Thailand) Bangkok BTS |
| 13 | DF | Chaivat Jamgrajang | 13 November 1989 (aged 31) | | (Thailand) Port |
| 14 | MF | Apiwat Chaemcharoen | 31 March 1991 (aged 30) | | (Thailand) Chonburi Blue Wave |
| 15 | FW | Nawin Rattanawongsawat | 21 September 1992 (aged 28) | | (Thailand) Bangkok BTS |
| 16 | DF | Peerapat Kaewwilai | 3 April 1996 (aged 25) | | (Thailand) Chonburi Blue Wave |

== Group D ==
=== Brazil ===
Head coach: Marquinhos Xavier

| No. | Pos. | Player | Date of birth (age) | Caps | Club |
|---|---|---|---|---|---|
| 1 | GK | Guitta | 11 June 1987 (aged 34) | | (Portugal) Sporting CP |
| 2 | GK | Djony | 7 June 1985 (aged 36) | | (Brazil) Magnus Futsal |
| 3 | GK | Willian Dorn | 17 December 1994 (aged 26) | | (Brazil) Joinville |
| 4 | DF | Marlon | 28 December 1987 (aged 33) | | (Spain) Palma FS |
| 5 | MF | Bruno | 10 April 1987 (aged 34) | | (Russia) MFK Ukhta |
| 6 | MF | Dyego | 5 August 1989 (aged 32) | | (Spain) FC Barcelona |
| 7 | MF | Leandro Lino | 25 July 1995 (aged 26) | | (Brazil) Magnus Futsal |
| 8 | MF | Leozinho | 5 December 1998 (aged 22) | | (Brazil) Magnus Futsal |
| 9 | FW | Vinícius Rocha | 30 March 1995 (aged 26) | | (Brazil) Carlos Barbosa |
| 10 | FW | Pito | 6 November 1991 (aged 29) | | (Spain) FC Barcelona |
| 11 | FW | Ferrão | 29 October 1990 (aged 30) | | (Spain) FC Barcelona |
| 12 | MF | Arthur | 16 May 1994 (aged 27) | | (Portugal) Benfica |
| 13 | MF | Gadeia | 14 June 1988 (aged 33) | | (Kazakhstan) AFC Kairat |
| 14 | DF | Rodrigo (captain) | 7 June 1984 (aged 37) | | (Brazil) Magnus Futsal |
| 15 | DF | Jefferson Lé | 7 September 1984 (aged 36) | | (Brazil) Corinthians |
| 16 | FW | Dieguinho | 22 June 1989 (aged 32) | | (Brazil) Joinville |

=== Czech Republic ===
Head coach: Tomáš Neumann

| No. | Pos. | Player | Date of birth (age) | Caps | Club |
|---|---|---|---|---|---|
| 1 | GK | Lukáš Němec | 22 February 1998 (aged 23) | | (Czech Republic) SK Interobal Plzeň |
| 2 | DF | Jan Homola | 17 February 1994 (aged 27) | | (Czech Republic) SK Slavia Praha |
| 3 | FW | Jiří Vokoun | 11 December 1996 (aged 24) | | (Czech Republic) SK Olympik Mělník |
| 4 | MF | Radim Záruba | 28 December 1994 (aged 26) | | (Czech Republic) SK Slavia Praha |
| 5 | MF | Pavel Drozd | 12 September 1995 (aged 26) | | (Czech Republic) Era-Pack Chrudim |
| 6 | DF | Lukáš Křivánek | 23 June 1997 (aged 24) | | (Czech Republic) AC Sparta Praha |
| 7 | MF | Lukáš Rešetár (captain) | 28 April 1984 (aged 37) | | (Czech Republic) SK Interobal Plzeň |
| 8 | MF | Matěj Slováček | 8 October 1990 (aged 30) | | (Czech Republic) Era-Pack Chrudim |
| 9 | FW | Tomáš Koudelka | 17 December 1990 (aged 30) | | (Czech Republic) Era-Pack Chrudim |
| 10 | MF | Michal Seidler | 5 April 1990 (aged 31) | | (Czech Republic) SK Interobal Plzeň |
| 11 | MF | David Drozd | 12 September 1995 (aged 26) | | (Czech Republic) Era-Pack Chrudim |
| 12 | GK | Libor Gerčák | 22 July 1975 (aged 46) | | (Czech Republic) AC Sparta Praha |
| 13 | DF | Michal Holý | 29 May 1990 (aged 31) | | (Czech Republic) SK Interobal Plzeň |
| 14 | FW | Tomáš Vnuk | 1 December 1993 (aged 27) | | (Czech Republic) SK Interobal Plzeň |
| 15 | FW | David Jošt | 1 February 1995 (aged 26) | | (Czech Republic) SK Slavia Praha |
| 16 | GK | Ondřej Vahala | 25 May 1990 (aged 31) | | (Czech Republic) SK Interobal Plzeň |

=== Panama ===
Head coach: (Spain) José Manuel Botana

| No. | Pos. | Player | Date of birth (age) | Caps | Club |
|---|---|---|---|---|---|
| 1 | GK | Jaime Peñaloza | 3 May 1997 (aged 24) | | (Panama) San Miguelito FC |
| 2 | DF | Ricardo Ledezma | 16 December 1994 (aged 26) | | (Panama) San Miguelito FC |
| 3 | DF | Brayan Hurst | 20 October 1998 (aged 22) | | (Panama) San Miguelito FC |
| 4 | MF | Nagdiel del Rosário | 8 May 1996 (aged 25) | | (Panama) Panamá Oeste |
| 5 | MF | Alfonso Maquensi | 7 August 1997 (aged 24) | | (Panama) San Miguelito FC |
| 6 | DF | Edgar Rivas | 21 April 1989 (aged 32) | | (Panama) Perejil Futsal |
| 7 | MF | Claudio Goodridge | 2 January 1990 (aged 31) | | (Panama) San Martín Futsal |
| 8 | MF | Ruman Milord | 4 May 1998 (aged 23) | | (Panama) San Miguelito FC |
| 9 | FW | Aquiles Campos | 13 November 1991 (aged 29) | | (Panama) San Miguelito FC |
| 10 | FW | Michael de León (captain) | 1 March 1989 (aged 32) | | (Panama) Santa Gema Futsal |
| 11 | FW | Abdiel Castrellón | 19 July 1991 (aged 30) | | Unattached |
| 12 | GK | Jorge Hernández | 22 December 1994 (aged 26) | | (Panama) Panamá Oeste |
| 13 | MF | Allan Aparicio | 12 May 2001 (aged 20) | | (Panama) San Miguelito FC |
| 14 | MF | Yail García | 26 October 1991 (aged 29) | | (Panama) San Miguelito FC |
| 15 | MF | Abdiel Ortiz | 1 July 1996 (aged 25) | | (Panama) San Miguelito FC |
| 16 | GK | Sergio Alzamora | 7 October 1996 (aged 24) | | Panama FC |

=== Vietnam ===
Head coach: Phạm Minh Giang

| No. | Pos. | Player | Date of birth (age) | Caps | Club |
|---|---|---|---|---|---|
| 1 | GK | Hồ Văn Ý | 1 January 1997 (aged 24) | | (Vietnam) Thái Sơn Nam |
| 2 | GK | Nguyễn Hoàng Anh | 25 October 1995 (aged 25) | | (Vietnam) Sahako |
| 3 | MF | Lê Quốc Nam | 14 November 1993 (aged 27) | | (Vietnam) Thái Sơn Nam |
| 4 | MF | Châu Đoàn Phát | 14 March 1999 (aged 22) | | (Vietnam) Thái Sơn Nam |
| 5 | DF | Nguyễn Anh Quý | 12 December 1992 (aged 28) | | (Vietnam) Kardiachain Sài Gòn |
| 6 | MF | Phạm Đức Hòa | 12 April 1991 (aged 30) | | (Vietnam) Thái Sơn Nam |
| 7 | MF | Nguyễn Anh Duy | 20 September 1994 (aged 26) | | (Vietnam) Thái Sơn Nam |
| 8 | FW | Nguyễn Minh Trí | 8 April 1996 (aged 25) | | (Vietnam) Thái Sơn Nam |
| 9 | FW | Nguyễn Đắc Huy | 10 May 1991 (aged 30) | | (Vietnam) Sahako |
| 10 | FW | Vũ Đức Tùng | 3 January 1995 (aged 26) | | (Vietnam) Thái Sơn Bắc |
| 11 | DF | Trần Văn Vũ (captain) | 30 May 1990 (aged 31) | | (Vietnam) Thái Sơn Nam |
| 12 | MF | Nguyễn Thành Tín | 17 August 1993 (aged 28) | | (Vietnam) Thái Sơn Bắc |
| 13 | DF | Nhan Gia Hưng | 13 July 2002 (aged 19) | | (Vietnam) Thái Sơn Nam |
| 14 | MF | Nguyễn Văn Hiếu | 9 September 1998 (aged 23) | | (Vietnam) Hiếu Hoa Đà Nẵng |
| 15 | DF | Khổng Đình Hùng | 11 November 1989 (aged 31) | | (Vietnam) Sahako |
| 16 | GK | Mai Xuân Hiệp | 1 July 1992 (aged 29) | | (Vietnam) Sahako |

== Group E ==
=== Angola ===
Head coach: Rui Sampaio

| No. | Pos. | Player | Date of birth (age) | Caps | Club |
|---|---|---|---|---|---|
| 1 | GK | Gomito | 4 August 2002 (aged 19) | | (Angola) Coprat FC |
| 2 | FW | Toni | 19 June 1997 (aged 24) | | (Portugal) Os Vinhais |
| 3 | MF | Edy | 17 February 1997 (aged 24) | | (Portugal) Estoril Praia |
| 4 | DF | Leo | 16 May 2000 (aged 21) | | (Angola) RNT Luanda |
| 5 | MF | João | 24 November 1999 (aged 21) | | (France) Bastia AF |
| 6 | FW | Branquinho | 25 March 2000 (aged 21) | | (Angola) Coprat FC |
| 7 | MF | Prado | 15 January 1991 (aged 30) | | (Angola) Coprat FC |
| 8 | MF | Kota (captain) | 29 March 1991 (aged 30) | | (Angola) Coprat FC |
| 9 | MF | Kaluanda | 8 March 1995 (aged 26) | | (Angola) Coprat FC |
| 10 | MF | Manosele | 14 June 1997 (aged 24) | | (Angola) RNT Luanda |
| 11 | MF | Jó | 15 April 1998 (aged 23) | | (Angola) RNT Luanda |
| 12 | GK | Manasse | 4 April 1991 (aged 30) | | (Angola) Academicos Namibe |
| 13 | DF | Ricardo | 1 November 1994 (aged 26) | | (Luxembourg) CS Sanem |
| 14 | FW | Osna | 3 February 1994 (aged 27) | | (Angola) Coprat FC |
| 15 | FW | Guga | 14 May 1994 (aged 27) | | (Angola) Coprat FC |
| 16 | GK | Neblu | 13 May 1994 (aged 27) | | (Angola) Coprat FC |

=== Japan ===
Head coach: (Spain) Bruno García

The final squad was announced on 25 August 2021.

| No. | Pos. | Player | Date of birth (age) | Caps | Club |
|---|---|---|---|---|---|
| 1 | GK | Yushi Sekiguchi | 24 October 1991 (aged 29) | | (Japan) Nagoya Oceans |
| 2 | GK | Higor Pires | 7 July 1980 (aged 41) | | (Japan) Pescadola Machida |
| 3 | FP | Ryuta Hoshi | 1 June 1987 (aged 34) | | (Japan) Nagoya Oceans |
| 4 | FP | Kiyoto Yagi | 24 March 1994 (aged 27) | | (Japan) Nagoya Oceans |
| 5 | FP | Akira Minamoto | 28 January 1987 (aged 34) | | (Japan) Fuchu Athletic |
| 6 | FP | Tomoki Yoshikawa (captain) | 3 February 1989 (aged 32) | | (Japan) Nagoya Oceans |
| 7 | FP | Yuki Murota | 13 April 1992 (aged 29) | | (Japan) Espolada Hokkaido |
| 8 | FP | Minami Kato | 20 December 1992 (aged 28) | | (Japan) Shriker Osaka |
| 9 | FP | Kazuya Shimizu | 6 February 1997 (aged 24) | | (Spain) Córdoba CF |
| 10 | FP | Rafael Henmi | 30 July 1992 (aged 29) | | (Portugal) Benfica |
| 11 | FP | Shota Hoshi | 17 November 1985 (aged 35) | | (Japan) Nagoya Oceans |
| 12 | FP | Takashi Morimura | 9 September 1991 (aged 29) | | (Japan) Vasagey Oita |
| 13 | FP | Gensuke Mori | 12 April 2001 (aged 20) | | (Japan) Pescadola Machida |
| 14 | FP | Ryosuke Nishitani | 31 January 1986 (aged 35) | | (Japan) Nagoya Oceans |
| 15 | FP | Arthur Oliveira | 30 July 1990 (aged 31) | | (Japan) Nagoya Oceans |
| 16 | GK | Daimu Yazawa | 27 February 1994 (aged 27) | | (Japan) Vasagey Oita |

=== Paraguay ===
Head coach: Carlos Chilavert

| No. | Pos. | Player | Date of birth (age) | Caps | Club |
|---|---|---|---|---|---|
| 1 | GK | Carlos Espínola | 6 April 1981 (aged 40) | 70 | (Paraguay) Sport Colonial |
| 2 | DF | Diego Poggi | 17 September 1998 (aged 22) | 19 | (Paraguay) Sport Colonial |
| 3 | DF | Julio Mareco | 4 September 1994 (aged 27) | 61 | (Paraguay) Sport Colonial |
| 4 | MF | Alcides Giménez | 14 November 2000 (aged 20) | 16 | (Paraguay) Cerro Porteño FS |
| 5 | MF | Juan Pedrozo | 30 March 1992 (aged 29) | 52 | (Paraguay) Afemec FS |
| 6 | FW | Richard Rejala | 5 February 1994 (aged 27) | 96 | (Paraguay) Cerro Porteño FS |
| 7 | MF | Javier Salas | 22 September 1993 (aged 27) | 48 | (Italy) Italservice Pesaro |
| 8 | MF | Arnaldo Báez | 30 March 1996 (aged 25) | 27 | (Paraguay) Cerro Porteño FS |
| 9 | MF | Hugo Martínez | 12 January 1993 (aged 28) | 93 | (Paraguay) Cerro Porteño FS |
| 10 | MF | Juan Salas (captain) | 20 October 1990 (aged 30) | 90 | (Spain) ElPozo Murcia |
| 11 | MF | Francisco Martínez | 12 January 1993 (aged 28) | 107 | (Paraguay) Cerro Porteño FS |
| 12 | GK | Gabriel Giménez | 29 May 1984 (aged 37) | 115 | (Paraguay) Villa Hayes |
| 13 | DF | Alan Rojas | 20 October 1998 (aged 22) | 21 | (Paraguay) Cerro Porteño FS |
| 14 | MF | Pedro Pascottini | 30 November 1998 (aged 22) | 19 | (Paraguay) Villa Hayes |
| 15 | FW | Jorge Espinoza | 22 November 1993 (aged 27) | 24 | (Paraguay) Cerro Porteño FS |
| 16 | GK | Giovanni González | 5 May 1995 (aged 26) | 25 | (Paraguay) Cerro Porteño FS |

=== Spain ===
Head coach: Fede Vidal

| No. | Pos. | Player | Date of birth (age) | Caps | Club |
|---|---|---|---|---|---|
| 1 | GK | Jesús Herrero | 4 November 1986 (aged 34) | | (Spain) Inter Movistar |
| 2 | DF | Carlos Ortiz (captain) | 3 October 1983 (aged 37) | | (Spain) FC Barcelona |
| 3 | MF | Borja Díaz | 19 August 1992 (aged 29) | | (Spain) Inter Movistar |
| 4 | DF | Marc Tolrà | 27 January 1991 (aged 30) | | (Spain) Levante UD |
| 5 | FW | Raúl Gómez | 25 October 1995 (aged 25) | | (Spain) Inter Movistar |
| 6 | FW | Francisco Solano | 26 August 1991 (aged 30) | | (Spain) Jimbee Cartagena |
| 7 | MF | Sérgio González | 30 June 1997 (aged 24) | | (Spain) Viña Albali Valdepeñas |
| 8 | MF | Adolfo Fernández | 19 May 1993 (aged 28) | | (Spain) FC Barcelona |
| 9 | DF | Bebe | 28 May 1990 (aged 31) | | (Spain) Jimbee Cartagena |
| 10 | MF | Adri Martínez | 3 October 1986 (aged 34) | | (Spain) O Parrulo Ferrol |
| 11 | MF | Chino | 13 November 1991 (aged 29) | | (Spain) Viña Albali Valdepeñas |
| 12 | GK | Juanjo | 19 August 1985 (aged 36) | | (Spain) ElPozo Murcia |
| 13 | GK | Dídac Plana | 22 May 1990 (aged 31) | | (Spain) FC Barcelona |
| 14 | FW | Raúl Campos | 17 December 1987 (aged 33) | | (Spain) Palma FS |
| 15 | DF | José Raya | 8 May 1997 (aged 24) | | (Spain) Inter Movistar |
| 16 | MF | Miguel Mellado | 23 July 1999 (aged 22) | | (Spain) Jimbee Cartagena |

== Group F ==
=== Argentina ===
Head coach: Matías Lucuix

| No. | Pos. | Player | Date of birth (age) | Caps | Club |
|---|---|---|---|---|---|
| 1 | GK | Nicolás Sarmiento | 3 December 1992 (aged 28) | | (Spain) Real Betis |
| 2 | DF | Damián Stazzone | 31 January 1986 (aged 35) | | (Argentina) San Lorenzo |
| 3 | MF | Ángel Claudino | 8 December 1995 (aged 25) | | (Spain) AD Sala 10 Zaragoza |
| 4 | DF | Lucas Bolo | 12 March 1992 (aged 29) | | (Italy) Italservice Pesaro |
| 5 | FW | Maximiliano Rescia | 29 October 1987 (aged 33) | | (Spain) Levante UD |
| 6 | MF | Sebastián Corso | 12 February 1992 (aged 29) | | (Spain) Industrias Santa Coloma |
| 7 | MF | Leandro Cuzzolino (captain) | 21 May 1987 (aged 34) | | (Italy) Italservice Pesaro |
| 8 | MF | Santiago Basile | 25 July 1988 (aged 33) | | (Italy) CMB Matera |
| 9 | FW | Cristian Borruto | 7 May 1987 (aged 34) | | (Italy) Italservice Pesaro |
| 10 | MF | Constantino Vaporaki | 6 January 1990 (aged 31) | | (Italy) Meta Catania |
| 11 | FW | Alan Brandi | 24 November 1987 (aged 33) | | (Spain) Jaén Paraíso Interior |
| 12 | GK | Lucas Farach | 3 October 1991 (aged 29) | | (Argentina) Kimberley AC |
| 13 | GK | Guido Mosenson | 7 March 1989 (aged 32) | | (Argentina) Boca Juniors |
| 14 | DF | Pablo Taborda | 3 September 1986 (aged 35) | | (Italy) Italservice Pesaro |
| 15 | MF | Andrés Santos | 7 December 1988 (aged 32) | | (Italy) CMB Matera |
| 16 | MF | Matías Edelstein | 18 June 1992 (aged 29) | | (Argentina) Sociedad Hebraica |

=== Iran ===
Head coach: Mohammad Nazemasharieh

| No. | Pos. | Player | Date of birth (age) | Caps | Club |
|---|---|---|---|---|---|
| 1 | GK | Sepehr Mohammadi | 8 August 1989 (aged 32) | | (Iran) Giti Pasand |
| 2 | GK | Alireza Samimi | 29 June 1987 (aged 34) | | (Iran) Mes Sungun |
| 3 | MF | Ahmad Esmaeilpour | 8 September 1988 (aged 33) | | (China) Shenzhen Nanling |
| 4 | DF | Alireza Rafieipour | 9 October 1993 (aged 27) | | (Iran) Crop Alvand |
| 5 | DF | Hamid Ahmadi | 24 November 1988 (aged 32) | | (Iran) Mes Sungun |
| 6 | MF | Mohammad Reza Sangsefidi | 2 November 1989 (aged 31) | | (Iran) Giti Pasand |
| 7 | MF | Ali Asghar Hassanzadeh (captain) | 2 November 1987 (aged 33) | | (Iran) Giti Pasand |
| 8 | MF | Moslem Oladghobad | 29 November 1995 (aged 25) | | (Iran) Crop Alvand |
| 9 | FW | Saeid Ahmadabbasi | 31 July 1992 (aged 29) | | (Iran) Giti Pasand |
| 10 | FW | Hossein Tayyebi | 29 September 1988 (aged 32) | | (Portugal) Benfica |
| 11 | MF | Farhad Fakhim | 14 October 1984 (aged 36) | | (Iran) Mes Sungun |
| 12 | FW | Mohammad Shajari | 30 August 1991 (aged 30) | | (Iran) Crop Alvand |
| 13 | DF | Farhad Tavakoli | 14 January 1989 (aged 32) | | (Iran) Giti Pasand |
| 14 | FW | Mahdi Javid | 3 May 1987 (aged 34) | | (Iran) Crop Alvand |
| 15 | FW | Taha Nematian | 8 February 1995 (aged 26) | | (Iran) Sunich Saveh |
| 16 | FW | Bagher Mohammadi | 21 June 1991 (aged 30) | | (Iran) Sunich Saveh |

=== Serbia ===
Head coach: Dejan Maješ

| No. | Pos. | Player | Date of birth (age) | Caps | Club |
|---|---|---|---|---|---|
| 1 | GK | Miodrag Aksentijević | 22 July 1983 (aged 38) | | (Germany) Stuttgarter Futsal Club |
| 2 | DF | Ninoslav Aleksić | 3 February 1995 (aged 26) | | (Hungary) SG Kecskemét |
| 3 | FW | Mladen Kocić | 22 October 1988 (aged 32) | | (Serbia) KMF Loznica Grad |
| 4 | FW | Lazar Milosavljević | 20 October 1998 (aged 22) | | (Serbia) KMF Novi Pazar |
| 5 | DF | Davor Popović | 23 December 1987 (aged 33) | | (Serbia) KMF Novi Sad |
| 6 | FW | Denis Ramić | 17 November 1994 (aged 26) | | (Serbia) KMF FON |
| 7 | FW | Dragan Tomić | 25 March 1991 (aged 30) | | (Belgium) FP Halle-Gooik |
| 8 | FW | Marko Pršić (captain) | 13 September 1990 (aged 31) | | (Kuwait) Al-Arabi |
| 9 | FW | Jovan Lazarević | 11 September 1997 (aged 24) | | (Russia) MFK Tyumen |
| 10 | FW | Strahinja Petrov | 14 December 1993 (aged 27) | | (Italy) Real San Giuseppe |
| 11 | DF | Stefan Rakić | 22 November 1993 (aged 27) | | (Poland) Rekord Bielsko-Biała |
| 12 | GK | Jakov Vulić | 10 March 1992 (aged 29) | | (Serbia) KMF FON |
| 13 | DF | Miloš Stojković | 3 October 1991 (aged 29) | | (Croatia) MNK Crnica |
| 14 | DF | Slobodan Rajčević | 28 February 1985 (aged 36) | | (Serbia) KMF FON |
| 15 | FW | Marko Radovanović | 10 October 1991 (aged 29) | | (Serbia) KMF FON |
| 16 | GK | Nicola Josimović | 16 March 1986 (aged 35) | | (Serbia) KMF FON |

=== United States ===
Head coach: (Serbia) Dušan Jakica

The final squad was announced on 1 September 2021.

| No. | Pos. | Player | Date of birth (age) | Caps | Club |
|---|---|---|---|---|---|
| 1 | GK | Diego Moretti (captain) | 8 September 1982 (aged 39) | | (Italy) Syn-Bios Petrarca |
| 2 | MF | Raphael Araújo | 18 September 1985 (aged 35) | | (United States) NY Ecuador Futsal |
| 3 | MF | Jeremy Klepal | 6 December 1992 (aged 28) | | (United States) Lansing City Futsal |
| 4 | DF | Eduardo Buenfil | 11 September 1997 (aged 24) | | Unattached |
| 5 | DF | Julián Escobar | 12 December 1987 (aged 33) | | (United States) Harrisburg Heat |
| 6 | MF | Luciano González | 4 November 1994 (aged 26) | | (Italy) Città di Massa |
| 7 | FW | Everson Maciel | 14 March 1978 (aged 43) | | (United States) Safira Futsal |
| 8 | MF | Daniel Matos | 20 March 1986 (aged 35) | | (United States) Milwaukee Wave |
| 9 | FW | David Ortiz | 20 September 2000 (aged 20) | | (United States) Dallas Sidekicks |
| 10 | MF | Tomás Pondeca | 10 October 2001 (aged 19) | | (France) Paris ACASA |
| 11 | GK | Robert Damron | 25 March 2002 (aged 19) | | (United States) Michigan Futsal Factory |
| 12 | GK | Estebán Vázquez | 1 September 1996 (aged 25) | | (United States) Mesquite Outlaws |
| 13 | FW | Zach Reget | 7 May 1995 (aged 26) | | (United States) Florida Tropics SC |
| 14 | MF | Diego Bobadilla-Mireles | 27 August 1993 (aged 28) | | (United States) St. Louis Ambush |
| 15 | DF | Guilherme Veiga | 21 April 1984 (aged 37) | | (United States) Milwaukee Wave |
| 16 | MF | Alencar Ventura Jr. | 7 October 1992 (aged 28) | | (United States) Safira Futsal |
