= Futsal in Russia =

The sport of futsal was widely played in Russia and the Russian national team was one of the major powers in European futsal as of 2016, participating in the FIFA Futsal World Cup and the European UEFA Futsal Championship. The main competitions within the country are the Russian Futsal Super League and the Russian Women's Futsal Super League.

Because of the 2022 Russian invasion of Ukraine, FIFA and Union of European Football Associations (UEFA) suspended from FIFA and UEFA competitions all Russian teams, whether national representative teams or club teams.

== Russia national futsal team ==
=== World Cup record ===
Year	Round	Position	GP	W	D	L	GS	GA
Netherlands 1989	Did not qualify							
Hong Kong 1992	Round 1	9	3	1	1	1	20	16
Spain 1996	Third place	3	8	4	2	2	29	17
Guatemala 2000	Fourth place	4	8	4	0	4	37	24
Taiwan 2004	Did not qualify							
Brazil 2008	Fourth place	4	9	4	1	4	62	31
Thailand 2012	Quarterfinal	5	5	4	0	1	32	3
Total	5/7		33	17	4	12	180	91

=== European Championship record ===
Year	Round	Position	GP	W	D	L	GS	GA
Spain 1996	Runner-up	2	4	3	0	1	17	10
Spain 1999	Winner	1	5	4	1	0	23	14
Russia 2001	Third place	3	5	3	0	2	14	9
Italy 2003	Round 1	6	3	1	0	2	5	6
Czech Republic 2005	Runner-up	2	5	3	0	2	15	10
Portugal 2007	Third place	3	5	3	0	2	13	12
Hungary 2010	Quarterfinal	5	3	1	1	1	8	5
Croatia 2012	Runner-up	2	5	3	1	1	14	8
Belgium 2014	Runner-up	2	5	3	1	1	22	11
Serbia 2016	Runner-up							
Slovenia 2018								
Netherlands 2022	Runner-up							
Total	11/11		40	24	4	12	131	85

== Russia students futsal team ==
=== Universiade record ===
Year	Round	Position	GP	W	D	L	GS	GA
São Paulo 1984	Did not qualify							
Parma 1990	Third place	3	5	2	1	2	12	12
Málaga 1992	Fifth place	5	5	3	0	2	38	19
Nicosia 1994	Winner	1	6	5	1	0	38	13
Jyväskylä 1996	Runner-up	2	6	5	0	1	40	14
Braga 1998	Runner-up	2	6	5	0	1	43	10
João Pessoa 2000	Third place	3	6	3	3	0	20	9
Tiszavasvári 2002	Winner	1	5	5	0	0	35	4
Majorca 2004	Third place	3	6	4	1	1	47	18
Poznań 2006	Winner	1	6	6	0	0	60	15
Koper 2008	Did not qualify							
Novi Sad 2010	Runner-up	2	6	5	0	1	33	8
Braga 2012	Runner-up	2	6	5	0	1	33	2
Málaga 2014	Winner	1	6	6	0	0	39	8
Goiana 2016								
Total	12/14		69	54	6	9	438	132

== Russian futsal champions ==
Season	Champions	2nd place	3rd place
USSR Futsal Championship
1991	KSM-24 Moscow	Metallurg Aldan	Agros-Intex Chişinău
CIS Futsal Championship
1992	Dina (Moscow)	Spartak (Moscow)	Stroitel (Verh-Neyvinsk)
Russian Futsal Top League
1992-93	Dina Moscow	Dina-MAB Moscow	Fenix Chelyabinsk
1993-94	Dina Moscow	Fenix Chelyabinsk	KSM-24 Moscow
1994-95	Dina (Moscow)	Minkas (Moscow)	VIZ (Yekaterinburg)
1995-96	Dina (Moscow)	KSM-24 (Moscow)	TTG (Yugorsk)
1996-97	Dina (Moscow)	GKI-Gazprom (Moscow)	TTG-Java (Yugorsk)
1997-98	Dina (Moscow)	VIZ-Sinara (Yekaterinburg)	GKI-Gazprom (Moscow)
1998-99	Dina (Moscow)	VIZ-Sinara (Yekaterinburg)	Minkas (Moscow)
1999-00	Dina (Moscow)	Spartak (Moscow)	GKI-Gazprom (Moscow)
2000-01	Spartak (Moscow)	Norilsky Nikel (Norilsk)	TTG-Java (Yugorsk)
2001-02	Norilsky Nikel (Norilsk)	GKI-Gazprom (Moscow)	Spartak (Moscow)
2002-03	Dinamo (Moscow)	Norilsky Nikel (Norilsk)	VIZ-Sinara (Yekaterinburg)
2003-04	Dinamo (Moscow)	Dina (Moscow)	VIZ-Sinara (Yekaterinburg)
2004-05	Dinamo (Moscow)	Spartak-Shchyolkovo Moscow Oblast	VIZ-Sinara (Yekaterinburg)
2005-06	Dinamo (Moscow)	VIZ-Sinara (Yekaterinburg)	Spartak-Shchyolkovo (Moscow Oblast)
2006-07	Dinamo (Moscow)	VIZ-Sinara (Yekaterinburg)	TTG-Java (Yugorsk)
2007-08	Dinamo-Yamal (Moscow)	TTG-Java (Yugorsk)	VIZ-Sinara (Yekaterinburg)
2008-09	VIZ-Sinara (Yekaterinburg)	Dinamo-Yamal (Moscow)	TTG-Yugra (Yugorsk)
2009-10	VIZ-Sinara (Yekaterinburg)	Tyumen (Tyumen)	Dinamo-Yamal (Moscow)
2010-11	MFK Dinamo Moskva	VIZ-Sinara (Yekaterinburg)	Sibiryak (Novosibirsk)
2011-12	MFK Dinamo Moskva	Sibiryak (Novosibirsk)	Gazprom-Ugra (Yugorsk)
2012-13	MFK Dinamo Moskva	Gazprom-Ugra (Yugorsk)	Tyumen
2013-14	Dina (Moscow)	Gazprom-Ugra (Yugorsk)	Sibiryak (Novosibirsk)
2014-15	(Khanty-Mansi Autonomous Okrug) Gazprom-Ugra	(Moscow Oblast) Dynamo MO	(Novosibirsk Oblast) Sibiryak

== Russian futsal National Cup winners ==
Season	Winner	Runner-up
2014/15	(Moscow Oblast) Dynamo MO	(Krasnoyarsk Krai) Norilsk Nickel

== Russian futsal Top League Cup winners ==
Season	Winner	Runner-up
1992-93	Dina Moscow	KSM-24 Moscow
1993-94	Minkas Moscow	Dina Moscow
