= 2020–21 in Russian futsal =

The Russian futsal schedule of competitions and cups from 2020-2021.

== National team ==
Win Draw Loss

29 January 2021 Euro-2022 (Q)	Russia	6–0	Armenia	Shchyolkovo, Russia
		UEFA Report; AMFR Report		Stadium: USC Podmoskovye; Attendance: No spectators

2 February 2021 Euro-2022 (Q)	Georgia	0–4	Russia	Tbilisi, Georgia
		UEFA Report; AMFR Report		Stadium: Olympic Palace; Attendance: No spectators

5 March 2021 Euro-2022 (Q)	France	2–3	Russia	Paris, France
		UEFA Report; AMFR Report		Stadium: Halle Georges Carpentier; Attendance: No spectators

9 March 2021 Euro-2022 (Q)	Russia	5–1	France	Shchyolkovo, Russia
		UEFA Report; AMFR Report		Stadium: USC Podmoskovye; Attendance: No spectators

9 April 2021 Euro-2022 (Q)	Armenia	v	Russia	Yerevan, Armenia
		UEFA Report		Stadium: FFA Technical Center Academy; Attendance: No spectators

12 April 2021 Euro-2022 (Q)	Russia	v	Georgia	Shchyolkovo, Russia
		UEFA Report		Stadium: USC Podmoskovye; Attendance: No spectators

== UEFA Futsal Champions League ==
Win Draw Loss

16 January 2021 Round of 32	MIMEL Lučenec (Slovakia)	1–7	(Russia) KPRF	Lučenec, Slovakia
17:00		Report		Stadium: Športová hala Arena

16 January 2021 Round of 32	FC Salines (Bosnia and Herzegovina)	2–5	(Russia) KPRF	Sarajevo, Bosnia and Herzegovina
19:00		Report		Stadium: Arena Hills

20 February 2021 Round of 16	Olmissum (Croatia)	1–2	(Russia) KPRF	Omiš, Croatia
19:30		Report		Stadium: Sportska Dvorana Ribnjak

20 February 2021 Round of 16	Gazprom-Ugra Yugorsk (Russia)	3–0	(Lithuania) Vytis	Lyubertsy, Russia
13:00 (15:00 MSK)		Report		Stadium: Triumph Sports Palace

== Super League ==
31st Russian futsal championship 2020/2021

=== Regular season ===
Pos	Team	Pld	W	D	L	GF	GA	GD	Pts	Qualification or relegation
1	(Sverdlovsk Oblast) Sinara Yekaterinburg	26	17	3	6	105	71	+34	54	Advance to the playoff round
2	(Tyumen Oblast) Tyumen	28	14	6	8	108	90	+18	48	Advance to the playoff round
3	KPRF Moscow	24	14	5	5	81	63	+18	47	Advance to the playoff round
4	(Krasnoyarsk Krai) Norilsk Nickel	26	14	3	9	93	79	+14	45	Advance to the playoff round
5	(Samara Oblast) Dinamo-Samara	28	13	3	12	95	91	+4	42	Advance to the playoff round
6	(Khanty-Mansi Autonomous Okrug) Gazprom-Ugra Yugorsk	22	11	3	8	70	68	+2	36	Advance to the playoff round
7	(Komi Republic) Novaya Generaciya Syktyvkar	26	8	3	15	82	102	−20	27	Advance to the playoff round
8	(Nizhny Novgorod Oblast) Torpedo Nizhny Novgorod	26	6	6	14	97	115	−18	24	Advance to the playoff round
9	(Komi Republic) Ukhta	26	2	2	22	63	115	−52	8	

Source: AMFR
Rules for classification: 1) points; 2) number of wins; 3) goal difference; 4) number of goals scored.

== National Cup ==
=== Knockout stage ===
Round of 16
(Nizhny Novgorod Oblast) Torpedo	7	2	9
(Komi Republic) Ukhta	4	2	6
(Khanty-Mansi Autonomous Okrug) MFK SpetsTrans	0	1	10
(Moscow) KPRF	13	10	23
(Samara Oblast) Dinamo-Samara	+	+	+
(Novosibirsk Oblast) Sibiryak	-	-	-
(Kemerovo Oblast) Korporatsiya ASI	2	3	5
(Tyumen Oblast) Tyumen	6	3	9
(Stavropol Krai) Golden Eagle	3	2	5
(Sverdlovsk Oblast) Sinara	5	1	6
(Moscow) Spartak M	0	3	3
(Krasnoyarsk Krai) Norilsk Nickel	6	3	9
(Moscow Oblast) GazpromBurenie	0	3	3
(Komi Republic) Novaya Generaciya	3	4	7
(Bashkortostan) MFK Alga	6	4	10
(Khanty-Mansi Autonomous Okrug) Gazprom-Ugra	12	5	17

Quarterfinals
(Nizhny Novgorod Oblast) Torpedo	8	3	11
(Moscow) KPRF	2	9	11
(Samara Oblast) Dinamo-Samara	2	2	4
(Tyumen Oblast) Tyumen	4	3	7
(Sverdlovsk Oblast) Sinara	4	7	11
(Krasnoyarsk Krai) Norilsk Nickel	5	3	8
(Komi Republic) Novaya Generaciya	2	3	5
(Khanty-Mansi Autonomous Okrug) Gazprom-Ugra	4	3	7

Semifinals
(Nizhny Novgorod Oblast) Torpedo	3	0	3
(Tyumen Oblast) Tyumen	1	3	4
(Sverdlovsk Oblast) Sinara	1	5	6
(Khanty-Mansi Autonomous Okrug) Gazprom-Ugra	5	4	9

Final
(Tyumen Oblast) Tyumen	0
(Khanty-Mansi Autonomous Okrug) Gazprom-Ugra	7

== Women's League ==
=== Eastern Conference ===
Pos	Team	Pld	W	D	L	GF	GA	GD	Pts	Qualification
1	(Perm Krai) SPK Perm Region	14	12	1	1	101	20	+81	37	Advance to the playoff quarterfinals
2	(Sverdlovsk Oblast) VIZ-Sinara Yekaterinburg	14	11	1	2	63	19	+44	34	Advance to the playoff quarterfinals
3	(Tyumen Oblast) Tyumen	14	10	0	4	52	37	+15	30	
4	(Chelyabinsk Oblast) UralGUFK Chelyabinsk	14	7	3	4	59	33	+26	24	
5	(Sverdlovsk Oblast) Reforma Team Yekaterinburg	14	6	1	7	56	55	+1	19	
6	(Chelyabinsk Oblast) Metar Chelyabinsk	14	5	0	9	44	57	−13	15	
7	(Kurgan Oblast) KurganPribor	14	1	0	13	23	90	−67	3	
8	(Sverdlovsk Oblast) LesTex Yekaterinburg	14	1	0	13	15	102	−87	3	

Source: amfr.ru
Rules for classification: 1) points; 2) number of wins; 3) goal difference; 4) number of goals scored.

=== Western Conference ===
Pos	Team	Pld	W	D	L	GF	GA	GD	Pts	Qualification
1	(Penza Oblast) Laguna Penza	20	12	4	4	70	32	+38	40	Advance to the playoff semifinals
2	(Nizhny Novgorod Oblast) Normanochka Nizhny Novgorod Region	20	10	4	6	38	28	+10	34	Advance to the playoff semifinals
3	(Moscow Oblast) Mospolitekh	20	8	4	8	55	46	+9	28	Advance to the playoff quarterfinals
4	(Saint Petersburg) Avrora St. Petersburg	20	7	7	6	38	34	+4	28	Advance to the playoff quarterfinals
5	(Moscow Oblast) Spartak Kotelniki	20	6	5	9	44	70	−26	23	
6	(Oryol Oblast) OGU-KPRF Oruol	20	4	2	14	36	71	−35	14	

Source: amfr.ru
Rules for classification: 1) points; 2) number of wins; 3) goal difference; 4) number of goals scored.
