= 2009–10 Russian Futsal Super League =

Russian Futsal Super League
- Season: 2009–10

The 2009–10 season of the Russian Futsal Super League was the 17th edition of the top-tier futsal competition in Russia.

== League table ==
P	Team	Pts	Pld	W	D	L	GF	GA	GD	Qualification or relegation
1	Viz-Sinara Ekaterinburg	56	22	17	5	0	114	45	+69	UEFA Futsal Cup
2	MFK Tyumen	53	22	17	2	3	105	67	+38	
3	Dinamo Yamal Moscow	52	22	16	4	2	130	66	+64	
4	TTG-Ugra Yugorsk	43	22	13	4	5	107	88	+19	
5	CSKA Moscow	34	22	10	4	8	86	94	-8	
6	MFK Sibiryak	26	22	7	5	10	68	61	+7	
7	Norilsky Nickel	26	22	7	5	10	82	84	-2	
8	Dinamo-2 Moscow	25	22	7	4	11	72	86	-14	
9	Dina Moscow	24	22	7	3	12	73	99	-26	
10	MFK Mytischi	21	22	6	3	13	67	95	-28	
11	Politech St. Petersburg	10	22	2	4	16	56	102	-46	
12	Novaja Generacija	4	22	1	1	20	50	123	-73	
13	Dinamo Timal Ufa	0	0	0	0	0	0	0	0	

== Top scorer ==
	Player	Club	Goals
1	(Brazil) (Russia) Cirilo	Dinamo Yamal	26
2	(Brazil) Eder Lima	ТTG-Ugra	25
3	(Russia) Dmitry Prudnikov	Viz-Sinara	24

== See also ==
- Futsal in Russia
