= 2001–02 in Russian futsal =

== European Cup Winners' Cup ==
1st Futsal Cup Winners Cup (unofficial)

Win Draw Loss

30.04.2002 Semifinal	Alfa Ekaterinburg (Russia)	4–3	(Portugal) Fundação Jorge Antunes	Augusta
18:00

01.05.2002 Final	A.S. Augusta (Italy)	2–3	(Russia) Alfa Ekaterinburg	Augusta
20:30

== UEFA Futsal Cup ==
Win Draw Loss

Group 4 (preliminary round)	Clearex Chorzów (Poland)	5–4	(Russia) Spartak Moskva	Chorzów

Group 4 (preliminary round)	Spartak Moskva (Russia)	4–3	(Slovakia) Program Dubnica	Chorzów

== Top League ==
10th Russian futsal championship 2001/2002

=== Regular season ===
Pos	Team	Pld	W	D	L	GF	GA	GD	Pts	Promotion or relegation
1	(Moscow) Dina Moskva	30	25	2	3	168	49	+119	77	Promotion to Playoffs
2	(Sverdlovsk Oblast) VIZ-Sinara Yekaterinburg	30	24	2	4	146	71	+75	74	Promotion to Playoffs
3	(Krasnoyarsk Krai) Norilsk Nickel (C)	29	23	1	5	156	59	+97	70	Promotion to Playoffs
4	(Moscow) Spartak Moskva	30	21	6	3	137	67	+70	69	Promotion to Playoffs
5	(Khanty-Mansi Autonomous Okrug) TTG-Yava Yugorsk	30	20	4	6	118	47	+71	64	Promotion to Playoffs
6	CSKA Moscow	30	17	3	10	118	87	+31	54	Promotion to Playoffs
7	(Sverdlovsk Oblast) Alfa Yekaterinburg (R)	30	16	5	9	109	59	+50	53	Promotion to Playoffs & disbanded after season
8	GKI-Gazprom Moscow (R)	30	16	5	9	108	72	+36	53	Promotion to Playoffs & disbanded after season
9	(Sverdlovsk Oblast) UPI-SUMZ Yekaterinburg	30	12	2	16	77	108	−31	38	
10	(Tyumen Oblast) Tyumen	30	10	5	15	94	116	−22	35	
11	(Tatarstan) Privolzhanin Kazan	30	9	5	16	71	95	−24	32	
12	(Saratov Oblast) Saratov-SPZ	30	9	1	20	76	126	−50	28	
13	Dynamo-23 Moscow	30	7	3	20	69	114	−45	24	
14	(Saint Petersburg) Politech St. Petersburg	30	4	5	21	38	89	−51	17	
15	(Nizhny Novgorod Oblast) Krona-Rosavto Nizhny Novgorod (R)	30	1	1	28	51	241	−190	4	Relegation to First League
16	(Saint Petersburg) Edinstvo St. Petersburg (R)	30	1	0	29	37	174	−137	3	Relegation to First League

Rules for classification: 1) points; 2) number of wins; 3) goal difference; 4) number of goals scored.
(C) Champions; (R) Relegated

=== Playoffs Bracket ===
Quarterfinals
1	(Moscow) Dina Moskva	5	1	X
8	GKI-Gazprom Moscow	6	2*	X
2	(Sverdlovsk Oblast) VIZ-Sinara Yekaterinburg	2	3	X
7	(Sverdlovsk Oblast) Alfa Yekaterinburg	1	2	X
(Pairings are reseeded after the first round)
3	(Krasnoyarsk Krai) Norilsk Nickel	3	5	4
6	CSKA Moscow	4	2	1
4	(Moscow) Spartak Moskva	6	5	2
5	(Khanty-Mansi Autonomous Okrug) TTG-Yava Yugorsk	7*	1	1

Semifinals
3	(Krasnoyarsk Krai) Norilsk Nickel	9	3*	X
2	(Sverdlovsk Oblast) VIZ-Sinara Yekaterinburg	7	2	X
8	GKI-Gazprom Moscow	3	1	4*
4	(Moscow) Spartak Moskva	0	3	3

Final
3	(Krasnoyarsk Krai) Norilsk Nickel	3	8	X
8	GKI-Gazprom Moscow	0	3	X

== Women's League ==
10th Russian women futsal championship 2001/2002
