= Stanislav Larionov =

Russian football player (born 1976)

- Born: 20 June 1976 (age 49); Leningrad, Russian SFSR

Stanislav Anatolyevich Larionov (Russian: Станислав Анатольевич Ларионов; born June 20, 1976, Leningrad, USSR) - Russian futsal player and Coach of MFK CPRF Moscow.

== Biography ==
Larionov began his professional career in 1999 at the club MFK Saratov, where he played a little more than one season. Then Stanislav returned to his native St. Petersburg, where for some time he represented the club Yedinstvo.

Soon, however, the team ceased to exist, and he continued his career in the Ekaterinburg club Finpromko-Alpha under Yuri Rudnev. Larionov took part in the sensational victory of the Ural club in the Russian Cup in 2001. It was on account of his winning goal against Moscow Dina in the final match. Soon after Finpromko-Alpha won the European Futsal Cup Winners Cup, and Stanislav contributed significantly with two goals in the semi-finals.

Despite the successes, Finpromko-Alpha soon ceased to exist, and Larionov thereafter played two seasons in Kazan Privolzhanin. Then he was invited to play for Rudnev in Moscow at Dynamo, where he also spent two seasons. During this time he became a two-time Russian Futsal Super League and won another Cup of Russia. He also noted the four goals in the draw UEFA Futsal Cup 2004/05, when Dinamo were finalists of the tournament.

After leaving Moscow club Stanislav played for MFK Norilsk Nickel, Gazprom-Ugra Yugorsk, Dinamo-2, and the summer of 2010 he returned to his native St. Petersburg, becoming the player of Polytech. In early 2012 he moved on loan to the Moscow Dina.

== Achievements ==
- Championship Russian mini-football (2): 2005, 2006
- Owner of Russian Cup on mini-football (2): 2001, 2004
- Recopa Cup 2002
