= Georgi Zamtaradze =

Russian futsal player

Personal information
- Date of birth: 12 February 1987 (age 39)
- Place of birth: Tyumen, Russian SFSR, Soviet Union
- Height: 1.90 m (6 ft 3 in)
- Position: Goalkeeper

Team information
- Current team: KPRF
- Number: 21

Senior career*
Years	Team	Apps	(Gls)
2003–2013	Tyumen		
2012–2013	→ KPRF		
2013–2014	Viz-Sinara		
2014–2017	Dinamo Moskva		
2017–	KPRF		

International career^{‡}
2012–	Russia	14	(2)
- * Club domestic league appearances and goals as of 22 September 2016 ‡ National team caps and goals as of 7 September 2016

Georgi Tamazievich Zamtaradze (Russian: Георгий Тамазиевич Замтарадзе; born 12 February 1987) is a Russian male futsal player, playing as a goalkeeper. He is part of the Russia national futsal team. He competed at the UEFA Futsal Euro 2016. At club level he is playing for Dinamo Moskva in Russia in 2016.
