= 2013–14 in Russian futsal =

== National team ==
Date	Venue	Opponents	Score^{1}	Competition	Russia scorers	Match Report
22 October 2013	Maringá (N)	Guatemala	4-0	FT	Fakhrutdinov, Sirilo, Eder Lima, Milovanov	AMFR
23 October 2013	Maringá (N)	Paraguay	7-0	FT	Sirilo, Milovanov(2), Fakhrutdinov, Shisterov, Antoshkin, Chishkala	AMFR
24 October 2013	Maringá (N)	Serbia	3-4	FT	Milovanov(2), Sirilo	AMFR
26 October 2013	Maringá (N)	Iran	4-2	FT	Milovanov, Shayakhmetov, Fakhrutdinov, Gustavo	AMFR
27 October 2013	Maringá (A)	Brazil	3-3 (pen. 2-4)	FT	Sirilo, Eder Lima(2)	AMFR
2 December 2013	Yazd (A)	Iran	3-6	F	Pula(2), Chishkala	AMFR
3 December 2013	Yazd (A)	Iran	2-2	F	Fukin, Pula	AMFR
31 January 2014	Lotto Arena, Antwerp (N)	Netherlands	7-0	EC	Cirilo(2), Lyskov, Eder Lima(2), Sergeev, Robinho	UEFA
1 February 2014	Lotto Arena, Antwerp (N)	Portugal	4-4	EC	Abramov, Pereverzev, Eder Lima(2)	UEFA
3 February 2014	Sportpaleis, Antwerp (N)	Romania	6-0	EC	Robinho, Shayakhmetov, Eder Lima(3), Sergeev	UEFA
6 February 2014	Sportpaleis, Antwerp (N)	Spain	4-3 (a.e.t.)	EC	Sergeev, Lyskov, Fukin, Robinho	UEFA
8 February 2014	Sportpaleis, Antwerp (N)	Italy	1-3	EC	Eder Lima	UEFA

1. Russia score given first

Key

- H = Home match
- A = Away match
- N = Neutral ground
- F = Friendly
- FT = Friendly tournament, 2013 Grand Prix de Futsal
- EC = 2014 European Futsal Championship

== Super League ==
=== Regular season ===
Pos	Team	Pld	W	D	L	GF	GA	GD	Pts	Qualification
1	Dynamo Moscow	33	24	8	1	166	97	+69	80	Advance to the playoff round
2	Gazprom-Ugra Yugorsk	33	22	4	7	156	131	+25	70	Advance to the playoff round
3	Dina Moskva (C)	33	21	6	6	153	103	+50	69	Advance to the playoff round
4	Tyumen	33	21	3	9	134	85	+49	66	Advance to the playoff round
5	Sibiryak Novosibirsk	33	17	3	13	138	124	+14	54	Advance to the playoff round
6	Sinara Yekaterinburg	33	15	10	8	138	106	+32	52 (Note: Sinara Yekaterinburg deducted 3 points.)	Advance to the playoff round
7	Norilsk Nickel	33	14	8	11	140	117	+23	50	Advance to the playoff round
8	Novaya Generaciya	33	9	5	19	116	138	−22	32	Advance to the playoff round
9	Mytishchi	33	8	6	19	113	132	−19	30	
10	KPRF Moscow	33	7	6	20	82	121	−39	27	
11	Politech St. Petersburg	33	6	4	23	121	172	−51	22	
12	Progress Glazov	33	1	3	29	105	236	−131	6	

Source: AMFR
Rules for classification: 1) points; 2) number of wins; 3) head-to-head points; 4) head-to-head goal difference; 5) head-to-head goals scored; 6) goal difference; 7) number of goals scored.
(C) Champions

== Women's League ==
22nd Russian women futsal championship 2013/2014

Pos	Team	Pld	W	D	L	GF	GA	GD	Pts
1	(Saint Petersburg) Avrora St. Petersburg (C)	24	18	4	2	72	28	+44	58
2	(Penza Oblast) Laguna-UOR Penza	24	13	5	6	89	46	+43	44
3	(Tyumen Oblast) Tyumen (R)	24	12	6	6	58	39	+19	42
4	(Moscow Oblast) Snezhana-Kotelniki	24	4	3	17	46	109	−63	15
5	(Nizhny Novgorod Oblast) Viktoria Nizhny Novgorod Region (R)	24	2	4	18	24	67	−43	10

Source: footballreview.ru
Rules for classification: 1) points; 2) number of wins; 3) goal difference; 4) number of goals scored.
(C) Champions; (R) Relegated

== Women's National Cup ==
7-8 March 2014

Semifinals
(Penza Oblast) Laguna-UOR Penza	3
(Nizhny Novgorod Oblast) Viktoria Nizhny Novgorod Region	1
(Moscow Oblast) Snezhana-Kotelniki (pen.)	4
(Saint Petersburg) Avrora St. Petersburg	3

Final
(Penza Oblast) Laguna-UOR Penza	5
(Moscow Oblast) Snezhana-Kotelniki	0
Bronze Final
(Nizhny Novgorod Oblast) Viktoria Nizhny Novgorod Region	1
(Saint Petersburg) Avrora St. Petersburg	0
