= 1993–94 in Russian futsal =

== Futsal European Clubs Championship ==
Win Draw Loss

22 April 1994 Group A	Dina Moscow (Russia)	5–2	(Italy) Torrino S.C.	Torrejón de Ardoz

23 April 1994 Group A	Dina Moscow (Russia)	6–8	(Croatia) Uspinjača	Torrejón de Ardoz

== Top League ==
Pos	Team	Pld	W	D	L	GF	GA	GD	Pts	Qualification
1	(Moscow) Dina Moskva (C)	33	30	1	2	233	83	+150	61	
2	(Chelyabinsk Oblast) Fenix Chelyabinsk	33	21	5	7	135	108	+27	47	
3	KSM-24 Moscow	33	21	3	9	123	79	+44	45	
4	Spartak Moscow	33	17	8	8	135	97	+38	42	
5	Minkas Moscow	33	17	3	13	125	97	+28	37	
6	Sargon Moscow (R)	33	14	4	15	96	111	−15	32	Withdraw before 1994-95 season
7	(Sverdlovsk Oblast) Stroitel Novouralsk	33	14	3	16	110	122	−12	31	
8	Dina-MAB Moscow	33	13	4	16	120	141	−21	30	
9	(Sverdlovsk Oblast) UPI Yekaterinburg	33	10	6	17	105	139	−34	26	
10	(Saint Petersburg) Galax St. Petersburg	33	10	4	19	89	109	−20	24	
11	(Novgorod Oblast) Zarya Novgorod (R)	33	7	1	25	111	185	−74	15	Qualification to Relegation tournament
12	(Novosibirsk Oblast) Sibiryak Novosibirsk (R)	33	3	0	30	65	176	−111	6	Qualification to Relegation tournament

Source: dina.ru
Rules for classification: 1) points; 2) goal difference; 3) number of goals scored.
(C) Champions; (R) Relegated

=== Promotion tournament ===
Pos	Team	Pld	W	D	L	GF	GA	GD	Pts	Promotion or relegation
1	(Saint Petersburg) PSI St. Petersburg (P)	3	2	1	0	14	7	+7	5	Promotion to Top League
2	(Sverdlovsk Oblast) Luch Yekaterinburg (P)	3	1	1	1	9	10	−1	3	Promotion to Top League
3	(Novosibirsk Oblast) Sibiryak Novosibirsk (R, P)	3	1	0	2	13	15	−2	2	Relegation to First League, but replaced Sargon in Top League
4	(Novgorod Oblast) Zarya Novgorod (R)	3	1	0	2	7	11	−4	2	Relegation to First League

Rules for classification: 1) points; 2) goal difference; 3) number of goals scored.
(P) Promoted; (R) Relegated

== National Cup ==
=== Final Four ===
Semifinals
(Moscow) Dina Moskva	5
Spartak Moscow	4
Dina-MAB Moscow	1
(Rostov Oblast) LEHG Rostov-on-Don	5

Final
(Moscow) Dina Moskva	6
(Rostov Oblast) LEHG Rostov-on-Don	1
Third place
Spartak Moscow	6
Dina-MAB Moscow	1

== Top League Cup ==
Quarterfinals
1	(Moscow) Dina	11	5	6
8	(Moscow) Dina-MAB	3	3	4
2	(Chelyabinsk Oblast) Fenix
7	(Sverdlovsk Oblast) Stroitel
3	(Moscow) KSM-24
6	(Moscow) Sargon
4	(Moscow) Spartak
5	(Moscow) Minkas

Semifinals
1	(Moscow) Dina	+	+	+
2	(Chelyabinsk Oblast) Fenix (withdraw)	-	-	-
5	(Moscow) Minkas

Final
1	(Moscow) Dina	3
5	(Moscow) Minkas (a.e.t.)	4

== First League ==
=== First stage ===
==== First group ====
Pos	Team	Pld	W	D	L	GF	GA	GD	Pts	Qualification
1	MKZ Torpedo Moscow (A)	15	12	0	3	69	25	+44	24	Qualification to Second stage
2	(Saint Petersburg) PSI St. Petersburg (A)	15	9	2	4	59	48	+11	20	Qualification to Second stage
3	(Saint Petersburg) Samson St. Petersburg (A)	15	8	1	6	44	40	+4	17	Qualification to Second stage
4	Perovo Moscow	15	7	1	7	37	40	−3	15	
5	Dina-Sportekh Moscow	15	6	1	8	36	40	−4	13	
6	(Yakutia) Universitet Yakutsk	15	0	1	14	24	73	−49	1	

Rules for classification: 1) points; 2) goal difference; 3) number of goals scored.
(A) Advance to a further round

==== Second group ====
Pos	Team	Pld	W	D	L	GF	GA	GD	Pts	Qualification
1	(Tyumen Oblast) Sibhefteprovod Tyumen (A)	15	10	2	3	101	62	+39	22	Qualification to Second stage
2	(Moscow Oblast) Orly Rossii Lyubertsy (A)	15	10	1	4	106	80	+26	21	Qualification to Second stage
3	(Tatarstan) Kosmos Kazan (A)	15	9	2	4	90	74	+16	20	Qualification to Second stage
4	(Leningrad Oblast) Lukoil Pushkin	15	8	1	6	81	67	+14	17	
5	(Samara Oblast) Avtograd Tolyatti	15	4	0	11	62	99	−37	8	
6	(Samara Oblast) Artyom Samara	15	1	0	14	50	111	−61	2	

Rules for classification: 1) points; 2) goal difference; 3) number of goals scored.
(A) Advance to a further round

==== Third group ====
Pos	Team	Pld	W	D	L	GF	GA	GD	Pts	Qualification
1	(Rostov Oblast) LEHG Rostov-on-Don (A)	15	12	2	1	78	31	+47	26	Qualification to Second stage
2	Novorus Moscow (A)	15	11	1	3	96	38	+58	23	Qualification to Second stage
3	(Nizhny Novgorod Oblast) Krona Nizhny Novgorod (A)	15	10	2	3	82	43	+39	22	Qualification to Second stage
4	(Moscow Oblast) Shchyolkovo	15	6	1	8	52	70	−18	13	
5	(Moscow Oblast) Kvark Protvino	15	2	0	13	34	85	−51	4	
6	(Krasnoyarsk Krai) Norilsk	15	1	0	14	27	102	−75	2	

Rules for classification: 1) points; 2) goal difference; 3) number of goals scored.
(A) Advance to a further round

==== Fourth group ====
Pos	Team	Pld	W	D	L	GF	GA	GD	Pts	Qualification
1	(Sverdlovsk Oblast) VIZ Yekaterinburg (A)	15	14	1	0	147	39	+108	29	Qualification to Second stage
2	(Sverdlovsk Oblast) Luch Yekaterinburg (A)	15	8	1	6	76	74	+2	17	Qualification to Second stage
3	(Sverdlovsk Oblast) Tornado Yekaterinburg (A)	15	8	0	7	64	78	−14	16	Qualification to Second stage
4	(Krasnoyarsk Krai) Zarya Yemelyanovo	15	6	2	7	67	57	+10	14	
5	(Tomsk Oblast) Yantar Tomsk	15	5	2	8	51	80	−29	12	
6	(Bashkortostan) Khimik Meleuz	15	1	0	14	51	128	−77	2	

Rules for classification: 1) points; 2) goal difference; 3) number of goals scored.
(A) Advance to a further round

=== Second stage ===
==== Group A ====
Pos	Team	Pld	W	D	L	GF	GA	GD	Pts	Promotion or qualification
1	MKZ Torpedo Moscow (P)	10	7	3	0	40	13	+27	17	Promotion to Top League
2	(Nizhny Novgorod Oblast) Krona Nizhny Novgorod (P)	10	5	3	2	30	23	+7	13	Promotion to Top League
3	(Saint Petersburg) Samson St. Petersburg	10	4	3	3	39	34	+5	11	
4	(Sverdlovsk Oblast) Luch Yekaterinburg (O)	10	4	0	6	26	45	−19	8	Qualification to Promotion tournament
5	(Moscow Oblast) Orly Rossii Lyubertsy	10	2	3	5	19	26	−7	7	
6	(Rostov Oblast) LEHG Rostov-on-Don	10	2	0	8	22	35	−13	4	

Rules for classification: 1) points; 2) goal difference; 3) number of goals scored.
(O) Play-off winners; (P) Promoted

==== Group B ====
Pos	Team	Pld	W	D	L	GF	GA	GD	Pts	Promotion or qualification
1	(Sverdlovsk Oblast) VIZ Yekaterinburg (P)	10	9	1	0	52	26	+26	19	Promotion to Top League
2	(Saint Petersburg) PSI St. Petersburg (O)	10	7	1	2	59	31	+28	15	Qualification to Promotion tournament
3	Novorus Moscow (P)	10	6	0	4	34	22	+12	12	Promotion to Top League
4	(Tatarstan) Kosmos Kazan	10	3	1	6	39	56	−17	7	
5	(Sverdlovsk Oblast) Tornado Yekaterinburg	10	2	1	7	20	35	−15	5	
6	(Tyumen Oblast) Sibhefteprovod Tyumen	10	1	0	9	28	62	−34	2	Team non-appearance in second tour

Rules for classification: 1) points; 2) goal difference; 3) number of goals scored.
(O) Play-off winners; (P) Promoted

== Women's League ==
Rank	Team
1	(Volgograd Oblast) Kontur-Yunior Volgograd
2	(Vladimir Oblast) Vlada Vladimir
3	(Saint Petersburg) Baltika St. Petersburg
4	(Moscow Oblast) Gloria Khimki
5	(Moscow Oblast) Sport-Istok Fryazino
6	(Moscow Oblast) Orlenok Krasnoarmeysk
7	(Primorsky Krai) Vega-Ussuri Ussuriysk
8	(Sverdlovsk Oblast) Yunost Rossii Yekaterinburg
9-12	(Saratov Oblast) Rus-DYUSSH-10 Saratov
9-12	Yuliya Moscow
9-12	(Voronezh Oblast) Tanais Voronezh
9-12	(Sverdlovsk Oblast) Malahit Yekaterinburg
n/c	(Saint Petersburg) UVD-Pamir St. Petersburg
n/c	(Khabarovsk Krai) HGIFK Khabarovsk
n/c	(Ukraine) Legmash Chernivtsi

== Women's National Cup ==
Final
(Volgograd Oblast) Kontur-Yunior Volgograd (pen.)	1 (9)
(Moscow Oblast) Sport-Istok Fryazino	1 (8)
