= Zviad Kupatadze =

Russian futsal player

Personal information
- Date of birth: 25 October 1979 (age 47)
- Place of birth: Tbilisi, Georgian SSR, Soviet Union
- Height: 1.72 m (5 ft 8 in)
- Position: Goalkeeper

Team information
- Current team: Gazprom-Ugra-double; Rostagroexport

Senior career*
Years	Team	Apps	(Gls)
2001–2002	AMMK-Azercell		
2002	Iberia		
2002–2004	Tyumen		
2004–2024	Gazprom-Ugra		
2024–	Rostagroexport		

International career^{‡}
2003–	Georgia		

Managerial career
- 2024–: Gazprom-Ugra-double
- * Club domestic league appearances and goals as of 11 October 2024 ‡ National team caps and goals as of 23 August 2024

Zviad Tarielovich Kupatadze (Russian: Звиад Тариелович Купатадзе; Georgian: ზვიად კუპატაძე; born 25 October 1979) is a Georgian futsal player, playing as a goalkeeper. He is part of the Georgian national futsal team. At club level he played for Gazprom-Ugra in Russia. In 2024, he joined an amateur side Rostagroexport which plays in National Mini-Football League (NML).

== Honors ==
=== Team ===
- UEFA Futsal Champions League: 2015–16
- Russian Futsal Super League (4): 2014–15, 2017–18, 2021–22, 2023–24
  - Runner-up (5): 2007–08, 2012–13, 2013–14, 2015–16, 2019–20
  - Third place (4): 2006–07, 2008–09, 2011–12, 2016–17
- Russian Cup (5): 2007–08, 2012–13, 2013–14, 2015–16, 2019–20
- Russian Super Cup: 2022
- European Futsal Cup Winners Cup: 2012

=== Personal ===
- The best player of the Russian Super League: 2021-22
- The best goalkeeper of the Russian Super League: 2014-15, 2016–17, 2021–22
- The best player of Georgia: 2016, 2018, 2021, 2022
