= Kupatadze =

Kupatadze (Georgian: კუპატაძე) is a Georgian surname. Notable people with the surname include:

- Konstantine Kupatadze (born 1983), Georgian boxer
- Lazare Kupatadze (born 1996), Georgian footballer
- Zviad Kupatadze (born 1979), Georgian futsal player
