= Fernando Drasler =

Brazilian futsal player

Personal information
- Full name: Fernando Drasler da Cunha
- Date of birth: 20 June 1988 (age 38)
- Place of birth: São Paulo, Brazil
- Height: 1.83 m (6 ft 0 in)
- Position: Defender

Team information
- Current team: JEC Krona
- Number: 71

Senior career*
Years	Team	Apps	(Gls)
- Botucatu
2010	Sala 10		
2010	Pouso Alegre		
2010	Nacional Zagreb		
2011	Independente		
2012	Palotina		
2013	Indaiatuba		
2014–2015	Sorocaba		
2016–2017	Joinville	38	(8)
2018–2019	ElPozo Murcia	54	(13)
2019–2020	Benfica	24	(4)
2020–2021	Inter Movistar	41	(14)
2021–2021	Dinamo-Samara		
2021–2022	Gazprom-Ugra Yugorsk		
2022–2022	Jimbee Cartagena	11	(1)
2022–2023	Real Betis Futsal	30	(9)
2023–	JEC Krona		

International career^{‡}
2019–2019	Brazil	4	(0)
2022–	Georgia	10	(7)
- * Club domestic league appearances and goals as of 00:00, 22 September 2023 (UTC) ‡ National team caps and goals as of 00:00, 22 September 2023 (UTC)

Fernando Drasler da Cunha (born 29 June 1988) is a Brazilian-born naturalized Georgian professional futsal player who plays as a defender for JEC Krona Futsal and the Georgian national team.

== Honours ==
Benfica

- Taça da Liga: 2019–20
