= 2014–15 in Russian futsal =

== National team ==
Win Draw Loss

26.10.2014 Friendly (242)	Serbia	2–3	Russia	Novi Sad, Serbia
	Kocić 11'; Radin 36'	Report	Robinho 2'; Afanasyev 4'; Fakhrutdinov 16'

27.10.2014 Friendly (243)	Serbia	0–1	Russia	Belgrade, Serbia
		Report	Robinho 11'

01.12.2014 Friendly (244)	Iran	1–1	Russia	Qom, Iran
		Report	Robinho 38'

02.12.2014 Friendly (245)	Iran	0–0	Russia	Qom, Iran
		Report

09.02.2015 Friendly (246)	Poland	0–6	Russia	Szczecin, Poland
		Report	Kutuzov 9'; Batyrev 24', 36'; Chishkala 32'; Romulo 35'; Fakhrutdinov 50'

10.02.2015 Friendly (247)	Poland	0–6	Russia	Stargard Szczeciński, Poland
		Report	Milovanov 10', 37'; Eder Lima 14', 20', 32'; Pereverzev 40'

18.03.2015 Euro-2016 (Q) (248)	Russia	5–0	Latvia	Sarajevo, Bosnia and Herzegovina
	Abramov 10', 23'; Lyskov 14'; Batyrev 29'; Romulo 35'	Report		Stadium: Olympic Hall Juan Antonio Samaranch

19.03.2015 Euro-2016 (Q) (249)	Netherlands	0–3	Russia	Sarajevo, Bosnia and Herzegovina
		Report	Lyskov 2'; Pereverzev 26'; Sergeev 36'	Stadium: Olympic Hall Juan Antonio Samaranch

21.03.2015 Euro-2016 (Q) (250)	Bosnia and Herzegovina	1–2	Russia	Sarajevo, Bosnia and Herzegovina
	Kahvedžić 40'	Report	Kutuzov 8', 40'	Stadium: Olympic Hall Juan Antonio Samaranch

10.10.2015 Friendly (251)	Iran	3–1	Russia	Urmia, Iran

11.10.2015 Friendly (252)	Iran	2–2	Russia	Urmia, Iran

== National Student Team ==
14th World University Futsal Championship 2014 in Málaga, Spain

Win Draw Loss

14 July 2014 Group C	Russia	15–1	Oman	Málaga

15 July 2014 Group C	Russia	4–1	Belarus	Málaga

16 July 2014 Group C	Russia	5–0	Azerbaijan	Málaga

18 July 2014 1/4 final	Russia	5–0	Czech Republic	Málaga

19 July 2014 1/2 final	Russia	2–1	Iran	Málaga

20 July 2014 Final	Russia	8–5	Brazil	Málaga

== Intercontinental Futsal Cup ==
The 15th edition of the world's premier club futsal tournament

Win Draw Loss

2 October 2014 1/2 final	Dinamo Moscow (Russia)	4–2	(Brazil) Intelli Orlândia	Almaty

3 October 2014 Final	Kairat Almaty (Kazakhstan)	3–2	(Russia) Dinamo Moscow	Almaty

== UEFA Futsal Cup ==
Win Draw Loss

2 October 2014 Main Round (Group 3)	ISK Dina Moskva (Russia)	4–2	(Romania) FC Deva	Troitsk, Russian Federation
		Report

3 October 2014 Main Round (Group 3)	ISK Dina Moskva (Russia)	8–5	(Croatia) MNK Almnus Zagreb	Troitsk, Russian Federation
		Report

5 October 2014 Main Round (Group 3)	ISK Dina Moskva (Russia)	5–1	(Belgium) Futsal Team Charleroi	Troitsk, Russian Federation
		Report

18 November 2014 Elite Round (Group B)	FK EP Chrudim (Czech Republic)	0–3	(Russia) ISK Dina Moskva	Pardubice, Czech Republic
		Report

19 November 2014 Elite Round (Group B)	ISK Dina Moskva (Russia)	5–4	(Azerbaijan) Araz Naxçivan	Pardubice, Czech Republic
		Report

21 November 2014 Elite Round (Group B)	ISK Dina Moskva (Russia)	4–1	(Slovakia) Slov-Matic Bratislava	Pardubice, Czech Republic
		Report

24 April 2015 1/2 final	ISK Dina Moskva (Russia)	4–7 (a.e.t)	(Kazakhstan) Kairat Almaty	Lisbon, Portugal
		Report

26 April 2015 Bronze Final	Sporting CP (Portugal)	8–3	(Russia) ISK Dina Moskva	Lisbon, Portugal
		Report

== Super League ==
25th Russian futsal championship 2014/2015

=== Regular season ===
Pos	Team	Pld	W	D	L	GF	GA	GD	Pts	Qualification or relegation
1	(Moscow Oblast) Dynamo Moscow Region	39	29	4	6	221	135	+86	91	Advance to the playoff round
2	(Khanty-Mansi Autonomous Okrug) Gazprom-Ugra Yugorsk (C)	39	27	5	7	208	96	+112	86	Advance to the playoff round
3	(Moscow) Dina Moskva	39	25	8	6	215	139	+76	83	Advance to the playoff round
4	(Novosibirsk Oblast) Sibiryak Novosibirsk	39	23	8	8	194	134	+60	77	Advance to the playoff round
5	(Sverdlovsk Oblast) Sinara Yekaterinburg	39	19	5	15	138	110	+28	62	Advance to the playoff round
6	(Tyumen Oblast) Tyumen	39	17	6	16	171	143	+28	57	Advance to the playoff round
7	(Krasnoyarsk Krai) Norilsk Nickel	39	15	9	15	145	148	−3	54	Advance to the playoff round
8	(Komi Republic) Novaya Generaciya	39	16	5	18	141	147	−6	53	Advance to the playoff round
9	(Moscow Oblast) Mytishchi (R)	39	13	7	19	135	151	−16	46	Relegation to Top league
10	KPRF Moscow	39	13	7	19	134	162	−28	46	
11	(Saint Petersburg) Politech St. Petersburg	39	12	5	22	151	183	−32	41	
12	(Moscow) Spartak Moskva (R)	39	10	4	25	144	218	−74	34	Relegation to Top league
13	(Yamalo-Nenets Autonomous Okrug) Yamal Novy Urengoy	39	10	2	27	125	221	−96	32	Team disbanded after season
14	(Udmurtia) Progress Glazov	39	6	1	32	108	243	−135	19	

Source: AMFR
Rules for classification: 1) points; 2) number of wins; 3) goal difference; 4) number of goals scored.
(C) Champions; (R) Relegated

=== Super League Playoffs ===
Quarterfinals
1	(Moscow Oblast) Dynamo MO	3
8	(Komi Republic) Novaya Generaciya	0
2	(Khanty-Mansi Autonomous Okrug) Gazprom-Ugra	3
7	(Krasnoyarsk Krai) Norilsk Nickel	0
(Pairings are reseeded after the first round)
3	(Moscow) Dina	2
6	(Tyumen Oblast) Tyumen	3
4	(Novosibirsk Oblast) Sibiryak	3
5	(Sverdlovsk Oblast) Sinara	2

Semifinals
1	(Moscow Oblast) Dynamo MO	3
6	(Tyumen Oblast) Tyumen	0
2	(Khanty-Mansi Autonomous Okrug) Gazprom-Ugra	3
4	(Novosibirsk Oblast) Sibiryak	0

Final
1	(Moscow Oblast) Dynamo MO	2
2	(Khanty-Mansi Autonomous Okrug) Gazprom-Ugra	3

Bronze medals
4	(Novosibirsk Oblast) Sibiryak	3
6	(Tyumen Oblast) Tyumen	2

== National Cup ==
=== Knockout stage ===
Round of 16
(Yakutia) Almaz-ALROSA	6	7	13
(Moscow) Dina	1	12	13
(Moscow Oblast) Mytishchi	0	5	5
(Krasnoyarsk Krai) Norilsk Nickel	1	6	7
(Saint Petersburg) Politech	1	3	4
(Tyumen Oblast) Tyumen	3	13	16
(Moscow) Spartak M	4	2	6
(Komi Republic) Novaya Generaciya	4	4	8
(Yamalo-Nenets Autonomous Okrug) Yamal	3	2	5
(Novosibirsk Oblast) Sibiryak	1	6	7
(Udmurtia) Progress	2	3	5
(Moscow Oblast) Dynamo MO	10	6	16
(Moscow) KPRF	2	3	5
(Sverdlovsk Oblast) Sinara	4	5	9
(Khanty-Mansi Autonomous Okrug) Fakel	1	1	2
(Khanty-Mansi Autonomous Okrug) Gazprom-Ugra	5	10	15

Quarterfinals
(Yakutia) Almaz-ALROSA	3	4	7
(Krasnoyarsk Krai) Norilsk Nickel	8	5	13
(Tyumen Oblast) Tyumen	3	3	6
(Komi Republic) Novaya Generaciya	4	3	7
(Novosibirsk Oblast) Sibiryak	6	3	9
(Moscow Oblast) Dynamo MO	6	4	10
(Sverdlovsk Oblast) Sinara	1	1	2
(Khanty-Mansi Autonomous Okrug) Gazprom-Ugra	1	7	8

Semifinals
(Krasnoyarsk Krai) Norilsk Nickel	3	3	6
(Komi Republic) Novaya Generaciya	3	2	5
(Moscow Oblast) Dynamo MO	4	2	6
(Khanty-Mansi Autonomous Okrug) Gazprom-Ugra	4	1	2

Final
(Krasnoyarsk Krai) Norilsk Nickel	2	2	4
(Moscow Oblast) Dynamo MO	4	6	10

== Eremenco Cup ==
=== Group stage ===
Team	Pld	W	D	L	GF	GA	GD	Pts
(Kazakhstan) Kairat Almaty	5	4	0	1	26	11	+15	12
(Russia) Sinara	5	3	1	1	20	11	+9	10
(Kazakhstan) Tulpar Karagandy	5	2	1	2	14	17	−3	7
(Russia) Tyumen	5	2	1	2	18	15	+3	7
(Czech Republic) FC Balticflora Teplice	5	1	1	3	12	27	−15	4
(Latvia) FK Nikars Riga	5	1	0	4	16	25	−9	3

=== Final four ===
Semifinals
February 26
(Kazakhstan) Kairat Almaty	4
(Russia) Tyumen	5
February 26
(Russia) Sinara	3
(Kazakhstan) Tulpar Karagandy	1

Final
February 28
(Russia) MFK Tyumen	2
(Russia) Sinara	6
Third place
February 28
(Kazakhstan) Kairat Almaty	3
(Kazakhstan) Tulpar Karagandy	0

== Top League ==
=== Top League regular season ===
Pos	Team	Pld	W	D	L	GF	GA	GD	Pts	Qualification
1	(Yakutia) Almaz-ALROSA Mirny	28	19	5	4	168	86	+82	62	Qualified for Playoff Semifinals
2	(Khanty-Mansi Autonomous Okrug) Fakel Surgut	28	17	7	4	160	119	+41	58	Qualified for Playoff Semifinals
3	(Komi Republic) Ukhta (C, P)	28	17	5	6	163	112	+51	56	Qualified for Playoff Quarterfinals
4	(Khanty-Mansi Autonomous Okrug) Ishim-Tyumen-2	28	15	7	6	131	73	+58	52	Qualified for Playoff Quarterfinals
5	(Yakutia) Zarya Yakutsk	28	8	9	11	130	120	+10	33	Qualified for Playoff Quarterfinals
6	(Saratov Oblast) Zenit-Saratov	28	7	6	15	118	143	−25	27	Qualified for Playoff Quarterfinals
7	(Chechnya) Berkut Grozny	28	6	2	20	96	185	−89	20	
8	(Khabarovsk Krai) Portovik Vladivostok	28	2	1	25	92	220	−128	7	

Source: AMFR
Rules for classification: 1) points; 2) number of wins; 3) head-to-head points; 4) head-to-head goal difference; 5) head-to-head goals scored; 6) goal difference; 7) number of goals scored.
(C) Champions; (P) Promoted

=== Playoffs ===
Quarterfinals
4	Ishim-Tyumen-2	2	3	5
5	Zarya	1	3	4
3	Ukhta	1	8	9
6	Zenit-Saratov	4	1	5

Semifinals
1	Almaz-ALROSA	5	3	8
4	Ishim-Tyumen-2	3	2	5
2	Fakel	3	2	5
3	Ukhta (p)	2	3	5

Finals
1	Almaz-ALROSA	5	4	9
3	Ukhta	7	6	12
Third place
2	Fakel	1	2	3
4	Ishim-Tyumen-2	3	5	8

== Youth League ==
=== Championship ===
Pos	Team	Pld	W	D	L	GF	GA	GD	Pts
1	KPRF Moscow (C)	28	18	4	6	122	82	+40	58
2	Dynamo Moscow	28	16	4	8	121	101	+20	52
3	(Khanty-Mansi Autonomous Okrug) Gazprom-Ugra Yugorsk	28	16	4	8	143	95	+48	52
4	(Krasnoyarsk Krai) Norilsk Nickel	28	15	3	10	103	81	+22	48
5	(Moscow) Dina Moskva	28	15	2	11	105	81	+24	47
6	Spartak Moscow	28	11	3	14	87	122	−35	36
7	CSKA Moscow	28	6	2	20	85	125	−40	20
8	(Moscow Oblast) Mytishchi	28	3	2	23	70	149	−79	11

Source: AMFR
Rules for classification: 1) points; 2) number of wins; 3) head-to-head points; 4) head-to-head goal difference; 5) head-to-head goals scored; 6) goal difference; 7) number of goals scored.
(C) Champions

== Women's League ==
23rd Russian women futsal championship 2014/2015

Pos	Team	Pld	W	D	L	GF	GA	GD	Pts
1	(Penza Oblast) Laguna-UOR Penza (C)	22	19	1	2	103	31	+72	58
2	(Saint Petersburg) Avrora St. Petersburg	22	12	5	5	49	28	+21	41
3	(Moscow Oblast) Snezhana-Kotelniki	22	9	2	11	61	70	−9	29
4	Torpedo-MAMI Moscow	22	4	3	15	47	85	−38	15
5	(Oryol Oblast) Gosuniversitet-ShVSM Oryol (R)	16	1	3	12	20	66	−46	6

Source: amfr.ru
Rules for classification: 1) points; 2) number of wins; 3) goal difference; 4) number of goals scored.
(C) Champions; (R) Relegated

== Women's National Cup ==
Semifinals
(Penza Oblast) Laguna-UOR Penza	3
(Moscow Oblast) Snezhana-Kotelniki	1
Torpedo-MAMI Moscow (pen.)	2
(Saint Petersburg) Avrora St. Petersburg	1

Final
(Penza Oblast) Laguna-UOR Penza	7
Torpedo-MAMI Moscow	1
Bronze Final
(Moscow Oblast) Snezhana-Kotelniki	3
(Saint Petersburg) Avrora St. Petersburg	2
