= Alex Felipe =

Brazilian futsal player (1993–2026)

Personal information
- Full name: Alex Aparecido Felipe dos Santos
- Date of birth: 23 April 1993
- Place of birth: São Paulo, Brazil
- Date of death: 6 January 2026 (aged 32)
- Place of death: Ukhta, Komi Republic, Russia
- Height: 1.88 m (6 ft 2 in)
- Position: Winger

Youth career
- –2012: Corinthians

Senior career*
Years	Team	Apps	(Gls)
2010	Cascavel		
2013–2014	Corinthians		
2014–2015	Inter FS		
2015–2016	Joinville		
2017–2018	Corinthians	32	(5)
2018–2020	Sporting CP	43	(26)
2020–2026	Norilsk Nickel	223	

International career
- Brazil
- * Club domestic league appearances and goals

Alex Aparecido Felipe dos Santos (23 April 1993 – 6 January 2026), commonly known as Alex, was a Brazilian futsal player who played for Norilsk Nickel and the Brazilian national futsal team as a winger.

== Biography ==
Since U-15 category, Alex had been a part of Corinthians futsal club, winning all of junior titles for the team. His first adult title came on his first year at the principal team when Corinthians won 2013 Liga Paulista de Futsal against AABB. With each team winning a match in the final, Alex scored at the additional time which proved to be a "golden goal" for Corinthians.

== Death ==
Alex Felipe died in Ukhta, Russia on 6 January 2026, at the age of 32. He had suddenly lost consciousness in the local airport while checking-in for a flight to Moscow two hours after the first game of the 2025–2026 Russian Futsal Cup semifinal against MFK Ukhta, the local ambulance crew was not able to resuscitate him. He was married to Danielle and had two children.

== Honours ==
- UEFA Futsal Champions League: 2018–19
- Copa América de Futsal: 2017
- Champion of Spain: 2014-15
- Portuguese Futsal Cup (2): 2018-19, 2019-20
- Portuguese Futsal Supercup: 2018
- Russian Futsal Cup: 2023–24
- Copa del Rey de Futsal: 2014-15
- Liga Paulista (2): 2013, 2018
