= Bruninho (futsal player) =

Brazilian futsal player

Personal information
- Full name: Bruno de Castro Iacovino
- Date of birth: 1 July 1997 (age 29)
- Place of birth: São Paulo, Brazil
- Height: 1.73 m (5 ft 8 in)
- Position: Winger

Team information
- Current team: Dinamo-Samara
- Number: 9

Youth career
- 2008–2014: Corinthians (football)
- 2015–2017: Joinville

Senior career*
Years	Team	Apps	(Gls)
2017–2019	Joinville	37	(8)
2019–2021	Inter Movistar		
2021–	Dinamo-Samara		

International career
2018–	Brazil		
- * Club domestic league appearances and goals as of 00:00, 10 March 2019 (UTC)

Bruno de Castro Iacovino (born 1 July 1997), commonly known as Bruninho, is a Brazilian futsal player who plays for Dinamo-Samara and the Brazilian national futsal team as a winger. Bruninho is the youngest son of futsal coach and former Brazilian international futsal player Vander Iacovino.
