= Vander Iacovino =

Brazilian futsal player

Personal information
- Full name: Vander Iacovino
- Date of birth: 25 September 1965 (age 61)
- Place of birth: São Paulo, Brazil
- Height: 1.72 m (5 ft 8 in)
- Position: Winger

Team information
- Current team: Joinville (manager)

Youth career
- –1982: Penha
- 1983–1984: GERCAN

Senior career*
Years	Team	Apps	(Gls)
1985	GERCAN		
1986	Sumov		
1987	Corinthians		
1987–1989	Água Branca		
1990–1991	Bordon		
1992	Banfort		
1993	Mitsubishi Ceuta		
1993	Ourense		
1994	Inpacel		
1995–2000	General Motors		

International career
1988–2005	Brazil		

Managerial career
- 2000–2001: Brazil
- 2002: Uninove
- 2003: Grêmio Barueri
- 2005: São Paulo
- 2006–2007: Joinville
- 2008: AFF
- 2009–2012: Brazil Women
- 2010: Brazil U20
- 2014: Sorocaba
- 2015–: Joinville
- * Club domestic league appearances and goals as of 00:00, 10 March 2019 (UTC)

Vander Iacovino (born 25 September 1965) is a Brazilian futsal coach and former player who is the manager of Liga Nacional de Futsal club Joinville. As a player Vander played as a winger for several Liga Futsal clubs and the Brazilian national futsal team. Vander is a father of three, and his youngest son Bruninho is also a Brazilian international futsal player.
