= Ivan Milovanov =

Russian futsal player (born 1989)

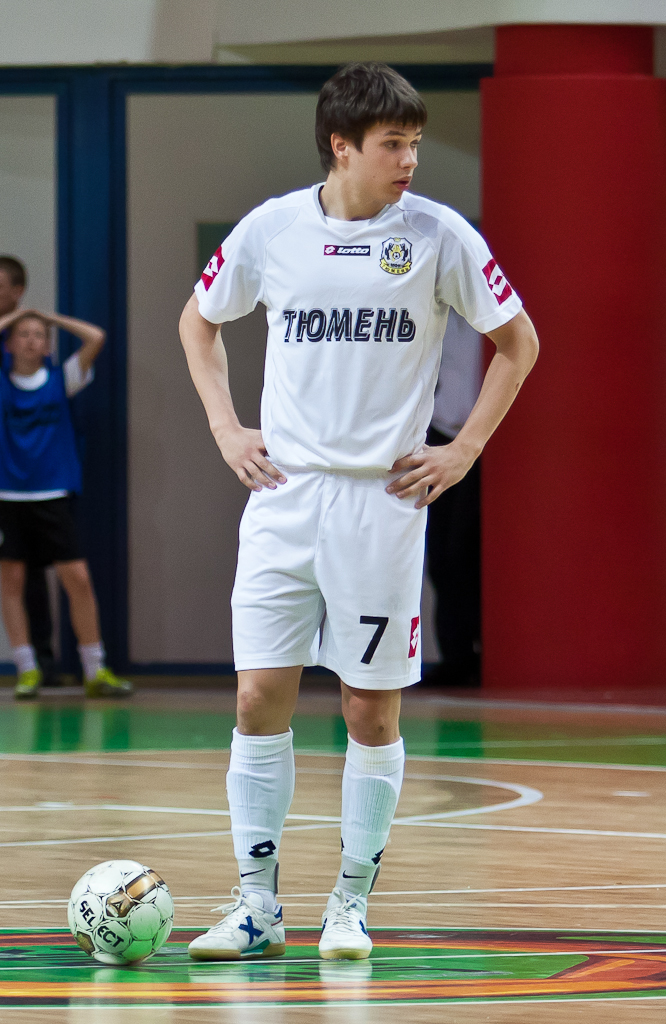

Personal information
- Date of birth: 8 February 1989 (age 37)
- Place of birth: Soviet Union
- Height: 1.72 m (5 ft 8 in)
- Position: Winger

Team information
- Current team: KPRF
- Number: 8

Senior career*
Years	Team	Apps	(Gls)
2006–2023	Tyumen		
2023–	KPRF		

International career
2008–	Russia		
- * Club domestic league appearances and goals

Ivan Milovanov (born 8 February 1989) is a Russian futsal player who plays for KPRF and the Russian national futsal team.
