= Dinamo-Samara =

Russian futsal club

- Full name: Dinamo-Samara
- Founded: 2018
- Dissolved: 2022
- Ground: MTL Arena, Samara
- Capacity: 1 500
- Owner: Igor Karpov
- General Director: Igor Grigorenko
- Manager: Konstantin Tymoshchenkov
- League: Superleague
- 2020-2021: Superleague; 6 (play-off: 1/4)
Home colours	Away colours

Dinamo-Samara (Russian: мини-футбольный клуб «Динамо-Самара») is a futsal club based in Samara, Russia. It was founded in 2018. Today Dinamo-Samara is competing in the Russian Super League.

== Current squad ==
Note: Flags indicate national team as defined under FIFA eligibility rules; some limited exceptions apply. Players may hold more than one non-FIFA nationality.

No.	Pos.	Nation	Player
1	GK	RUS	Maksim Krechetov
20	GK	RUS	Ilya Bespaliy
61	GK	RUS	Rodion Zalaletdinov
3	DF	KAZ	Arnold Knaub
8	DF	RUS	Nando
11	DF	RUS	Pavel Simakov
16	DF	RUS	Maksim Volinyuk
19	DF	RUS	Aleksey Lyalin
88	DF	RUS	Denis Povarov

No.	Pos.	Nation	Player
4	FW	UKR	Volodymyr Razuvanov
7	FW	RUS	Georgiy Potehin
9	FW	BRA	Bruninho
10	FW	RUS	Renat Shakirov
12	FW	RUS	Rishat Kotlyarov
17	FW	BRA	Fernando Drasler
58	FW	RUS	Andrey Zabolonkov
70	FW	BRA	Caio Jotinha

== Achievements ==
- Russian Futsal Super League
  - (bronze) Third place: 2018/2019

== League results ==
Season	Division	Place / Playoff
2018/19	Super League	6th / 3rd
2019/20	Super League	5th / 1/4
2020/21	Super League	6th / 1/4
2021/22	Super League	8th / —

== Head coaches ==
- Maksim Gorbunov (2018–2021)
- Stanislav Larionov (2021)
- Konstantin Tymoshchenkov (2022)

== See also ==
- MFK Dinamo Moskva
