= Guitta =

Brazilian futsal player (born 1987)

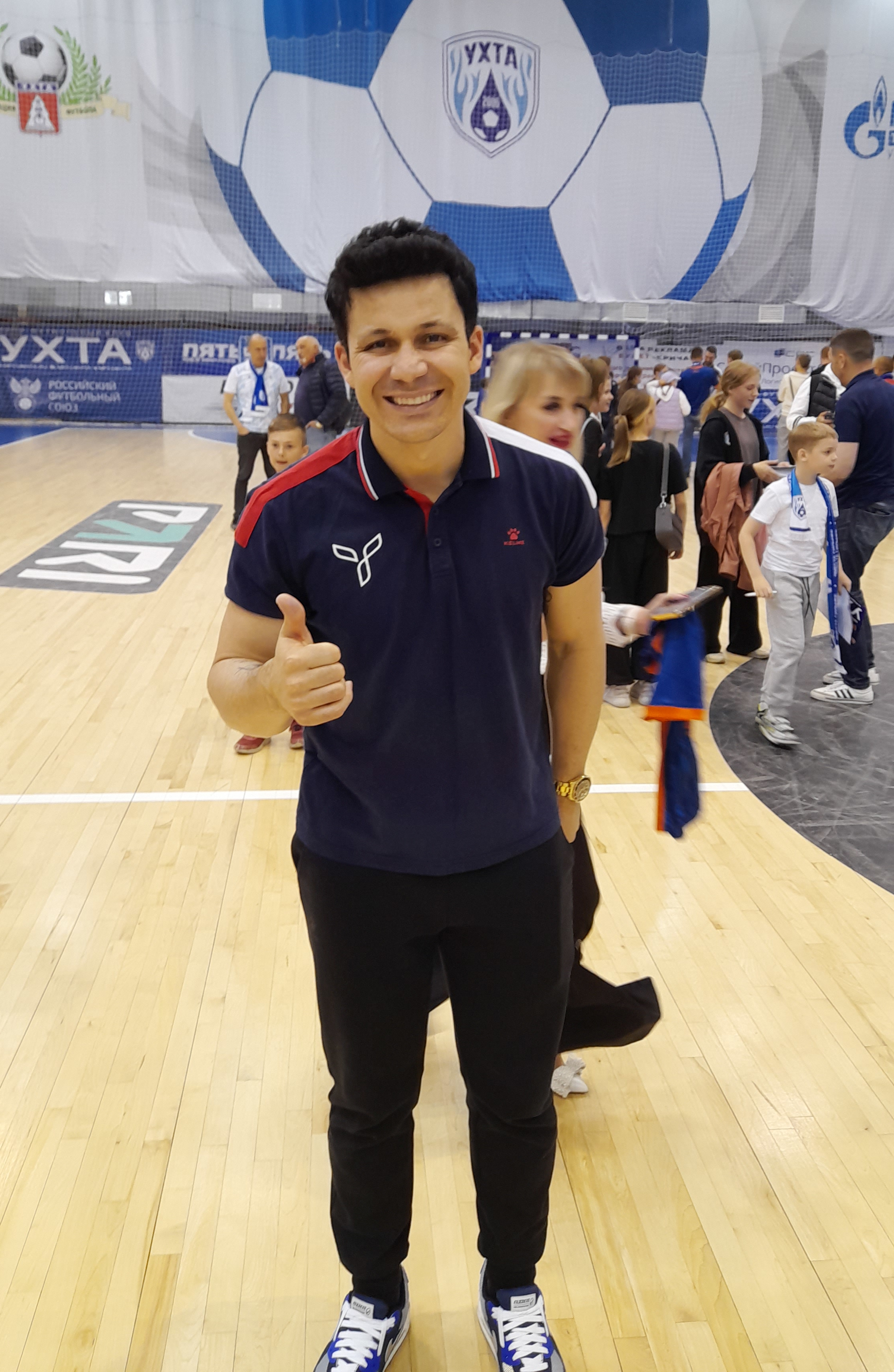

Personal information
- Full name: Thiago Mendes Rocha
- Date of birth: 11 June 1987 (age 39)
- Place of birth: Ribeirão Pires, São Paulo, Brazil
- Height: 1.77 m (5 ft 9 1/2 in)
- Position: Goalkeeper

Team information
- Current team: Ukhta
- Number: 14

Youth career
- –2007: Intelli

Senior career*
Years	Team	Apps	(Gls)
2006–2014	Intelli	313	
2015–2018	Corinthians		
2018–2023	Sporting CP		
2023–	Ukhta		(15)

International career
2011–	Brazil		
- * Club domestic league appearances and goals

Thiago Mendes Rocha (born 11 June 1987), known as Guitta, is a Brazilian futsal player who plays for MFK Ukhta and the Brazilian national futsal team.

== Honours ==
Brazil

- FIFA Futsal World Cup: 2012, 2024
- Futsal Planet best futsal goalkeeper: 2021
