= Dinamo-2 Moscow =

Futsal club based in Moscow, Russia

Dinamo-2
- Full name: Dinamo-2 Moscow
- Founded: 2005
- Dissolved: 2010
- Ground: Sports Palace "Dynamo", Moscow
- Chairman: (Russia) Anatoly Kurmanov
- Manager: (Russia) Andrey Solovyov
- League: Super League
Home colours	Away colours

Dinamo-2 Moscow (Динамо-2 in Russian) are a futsal club based in Moscow, Russia. They had been founded in 2005. They compete in Russian Futsal Super League.
