= Nicola Josimović =

Serbian futsal player

Nikola Josimović
Personal information
- Full name: Nikola Josimović
- Date of birth: 16 March 1986 (age 40)
- Place of birth: SFR Yugoslavia
- Position: Goalkeeper

Team information
- Current team: Euro Motus Belgrade

Senior career*
Years	Team	Apps	(Gls)
- Kolubara Lazarevac
- Bečej
- Euro Motus Belgrade

International career
- Serbia
- * Club domestic league appearances and goals

Nikola Josimović (born 16 March 1986), is a Serbian futsal player who plays for Kolubara Lazarevac and the Serbia national futsal team.
