= Russian Futsal Super League =

- Founded: 1991; 35 years ago
- Country: Russia
- Confederation: UEFA
- Number of clubs: 13
- Relegation to: Russian Futsal Top League
- Domestic cup: Russian Futsal Cup
- Current champions: Ukhta (2)
- Most championships: Dinamo Moscow (11)
- Website: superliga.rfs.ru

The Russian Futsal Superleague (Russian: Чемпионат России по мини-футболу (Суперлига), Superliga; complete official name BETCITY-Russian Futsal Championship among the club teams of Superleague, Russian: БЕТСИТИ-Чемпионат России по мини-футболу (футзалу) среди команд клубов Суперлиги) is the premier professional futsal league in Russia. It was founded in 1991. The Super League, which is played under UEFA rules, currently consists of 13 teams.

== Champions and prize winners ==
| Season | Champions | 2nd place | 3rd place |
|---|---|---|---|
| 1991 | KSM-24 (Moscow) (1) | Metallurg (Aldan) | Agros-Intex (Chişinău) |
| 1992 | Dina (Moscow) | Spartak (Moscow) | Stroitel (Novouralsk) |
| 1992–93 | Dina (Moscow) | Dina-MAB (Moscow) | Fenix (Chelyabinsk) |
| 1993–94 | Dina (Moscow) | Fenix (Chelyabinsk) | KSM-24 (Moscow) |
| 1994–95 | Dina (Moscow) | Minkas (Moscow) | VIZ (Yekaterinburg) |
| 1995–96 | Dina (Moscow) | KSM-24 (Moscow) | TTG (Yugorsk) |
| 1996–97 | Dina (Moscow) | GKI-Gazprom (Moscow) | TTG-Java (Yugorsk) |
| 1997–98 | Dina (Moscow) | VIZ-Sinara (Yekaterinburg) | GKI-Gazprom (Moscow) |
| 1998–99 | Dina (Moscow) | VIZ-Sinara (Yekaterinburg) | Minkas (Moscow) |
| 1999–2000 | Dina (Moscow) | Spartak (Moscow) | GKI-Gazprom (Moscow) |
| 2000–01 | Spartak (Moscow) (1) | Norilsky Nikel (Norilsk) | TTG-Java (Yugorsk) |
| 2001–02 | Norilsky Nikel (Norilsk) (1) | GKI-Gazprom (Moscow) | Spartak (Moscow) |
| 2002–03 | Dinamo (Moscow) | Norilsky Nikel (Norilsk) | VIZ-Sinara (Yekaterinburg) |
| 2003–04 | Dinamo (Moscow) | Dina (Moscow) | VIZ-Sinara (Yekaterinburg) |
| 2004–05 | Dinamo (Moscow) | Spartak-Shchyolkovo (Moscow Oblast) | VIZ-Sinara (Yekaterinburg) |
| 2005–06 | Dinamo (Moscow) | VIZ-Sinara (Yekaterinburg) | Spartak-Shchyolkovo (Moscow Oblast) |
| 2006–07 | Dinamo (Moscow) | VIZ-Sinara (Yekaterinburg) | TTG-Java (Yugorsk) |
| 2007–08 | Dinamo-Yamal (Moscow) | TTG-Java (Yugorsk) | VIZ-Sinara (Yekaterinburg) |
| 2008–09 | VIZ-Sinara (Yekaterinburg) | Dinamo-Yamal (Moscow) | TTG-Yugra (Yugorsk) |
| 2009–10 | VIZ-Sinara (Yekaterinburg) | Tyumen (Tyumen) | Dinamo-Yamal (Moscow) |
| 2010–11 | Dinamo Moscow | VIZ-Sinara (Yekaterinburg) | Sibiryak (Novosibirsk) |
| 2011–12 | Dinamo Moscow | Sibiryak (Novosibirsk) | Gazprom-Ugra (Yugorsk) |
| 2012–13 | Dinamo Moscow oblast | Gazprom-Ugra (Yugorsk) | MFK Tyumen |
| 2013–14 | Dina (Moscow) (10) | Gazprom-Ugra (Yugorsk) | Sibiryak (Novosibirsk) |
| 2014–15 | Gazprom-Ugra (Yugorsk) | Dinamo Moscow oblast | Sibiryak (Novosibirsk) |
| 2015–16 | Dinamo Moscow | Gazprom-Ugra (Yugorsk) | Sibiryak (Novosibirsk) |
| 2016–17 | Dinamo Moscow (11) | Dina (Moscow) | Gazprom-Ugra (Yugorsk) |
| 2017–18 | Gazprom-Ugra (Yugorsk) (2) | Sibiryak (Novosibirsk) | MFK Tyumen |
| 2018–19 | Tyumen (1) | MFK KPRF (Moscow) | Dinamo-Samara |
| 2019–20 | MFK KPRF (Moscow) (1) | Gazprom-Ugra (Yugorsk) | Sinara (Yekaterinburg) |
| 2020–21 | Sinara (Yekaterinburg) (3) | Tyumen (Tyumen) | Norilsk Nickel (Norilsk) |
| 2021–22 | Gazprom-Ugra (Yugorsk) (3) | MFK KPRF (Moscow) | Norilsk Nickel (Norilsk) |
| 2022–23 | MFK KPRF (Moscow) (2) | Norilsk Nickel (Norilsk) | Sinara (Yekaterinburg) |
| 2023–24 | Gazprom-Ugra (Yugorsk) (4) | Ukhta (Ukhta) | Tyumen (Tyumen) |
| 2024–25 | Ukhta (Ukhta) (1) | Gazprom-Ugra (Yugorsk) | MFK KPRF (Moscow) |
| 2025–26 | Ukhta (Ukhta) (2) | Tyumen (Tyumen) | MFK KPRF (Moscow) |

== Teams 2025-2026 ==
| Club | City | Home venue |
|---|---|---|
| Ukhta | Ukhta | USC “Ukhta” |
| Gazprom-Ugra | Yugorsk | “Yubileiny” Sports Home “Triumph” Sports Home, Lyubertsy |
| KPRF | Moscow | SC “Yunost”, Klimovsk |
| Novaya Generatsiya | Syktyvkar | SC “Orbita” |
| Norilsk Nickel | Norilsk | “Аika” Sports Hall |
| Sinara | Yekaterinburg | DIVS |
| Torpedo | Nizhny Novgorod | FOK “Meshchersky” |
| Tyumen | Tyumen | SC “Tsentralnyy” |
| LKS | Lipetsk | SC “Atlant” |
| Kristall | Saint Petersburg | Nova Arena |
| Sibiryak | Novosibirsk | “Sibiryak” Futsal Center |
| IrAero | Irkutsk | “Trud” Sports Home |
| Fakel | Surgut | “Energetik” Sports and Health Complex |
