= MFK Ukhta =

Russian futsal club

- Full name: Мини-футбольный клуб Ухта; Ukhta Mini-Football Club
- Founded: 2006
- Ground: «Ukhta» Universal Sports Complex
- Capacity: 600
- Chairman: Vitaly Gabuyev
- Manager: Vadim Yashin
- League: Superleague
- 2024–25: Superleague, 1 (regular league: 1)
Home colours	Away colours

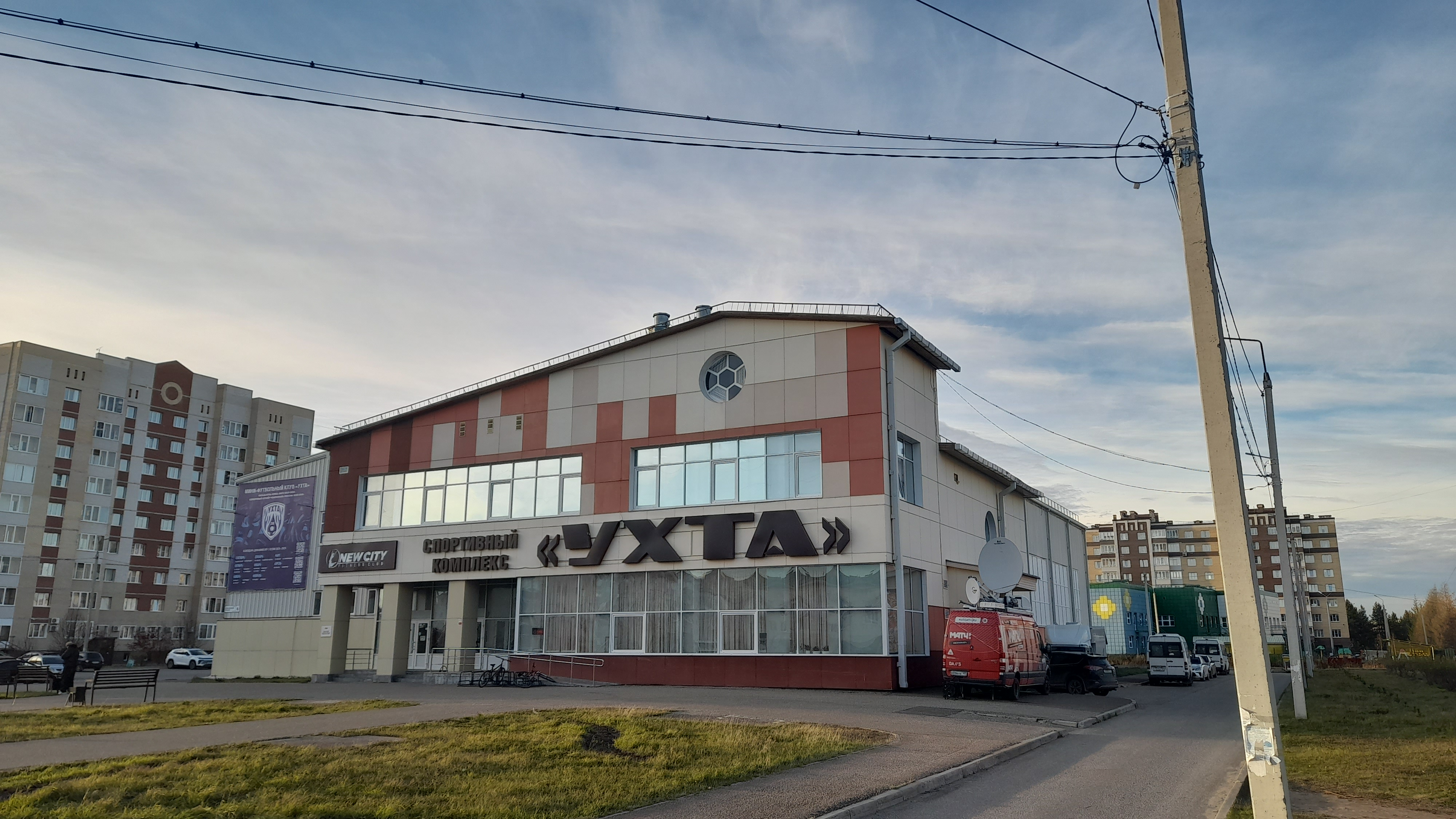
«Ukhta» universal sports complex, the home venue of the club

MFK Ukhta (Russian: МФК Ухта, Мини-футбольный клуб Ухта) is a futsal club based in Ukhta, Komi Republic, Russia. It was founded in 2006. The club is competing in the Russian Super League since the 2015–16 season.

== Current squad 2025–26 ==
No.	Name	Pos.	Nat.
1	Nikita Krechetov	Goalkeeper	(Russia)
14	Guitta	Goalkeeper	(Brazil)
30	Kirill Shchurok	Goalkeeper	(Russia)
83	Denis Kasimchuk	Goalkeeper	(Russia)
6	Muslim Erdonaev	Field Player	(Russia)
7	Sergey Denisov	Field Player	(Russia)
9	Maxim Perevalov	Field Player	(Russia)
10	Vladislav Musin-Pushkin	Pivot	(Russia)
11	Dmitry Prudnikov	Pivot	(Russia)
20	Jovan Lazarević	Field Player	(Serbia)
25	Dmitry Husainov	Field Player	(Russia)
47	Mikhail Moskalyov	Pivot	(Russia)
55	Vladimir Likhachyov	Pivot	(Russia)
77	Pedala	Field Player	(Brazil)
84	Maxim Yemelyanov	Defender	(Russia)
90	Alexandr Musatov	Field Player	(Russia)
94	Felipe Paradynski	Pivot	(Brazil) / (Armenia)
96	Andrey Pavlov	Pivot	(Russia)

== Titles ==
- Superleague (1): 2024-25
- Russian Supercup (1): 2025
- Russian League Cup (1): 2024
- Tyumen Oblast Cup (1): 2023
- Russian Top League (1): 2014-15

== Notable players ==
- (Brazil) Guitta
- (Brazil) Felipe Paradynski
- (Brazil) Bruno Rafael
- (Russia) Dmitry Prudnikov
- (Kazakhstan) Azat Valiullin
- (Russia) Sergey Vikulov
- (Brazil) Joan dos Santos Nunes
- (Serbia) Jovan Lazarević
