= MFK KPRF =

Futsal club based out of Moscow, Russia

KPRF
- Full name: MFK KPRF
- Founded: 2003
- Ground: Yunost, Klimovsk
- Capacity: 1 300
- Owner: Ivan Melnikov
- General Director: Arkadiy Beliy
- Manager: Besik Zoidze
- League: Superleague
- 2024-2025: (bronze) Superleague; 3 (play-off: 3)
Home colours	Away colours

KPRF (Russian: Мини-футбольный клуб «КПРФ») is a futsal club based in Moscow, Russia. It was founded in 2003. Since 2011–12, KPRF competes in the Russian Super League. The club is named after the Communist Party of the Russian Federation (KPRF), and was founded in 2003 initially as a fun club for a competition (which KPRF won) which included clubs representing different political parties of Russia.

== Current squad ==
Note: Flags indicate national team as defined under FIFA eligibility rules; some limited exceptions apply. Players may hold more than one non-FIFA nationality.

No.	Pos.	Nation	Player
19	GK	RUS	Albert Tsaider
20	GK	RUS	Artem Salakhov
25	GK	RUS	Dmitriy Putilov
92	GK	RUS	Aleksandr Boytsov
3	DF	BRA	Batalha
4	DF	RUS	Dmitri Lyskov
13	DF	RUS	Sergey Abramovich
31	DF	RUS	Denis Burkov
77	DF	RUS	Andrey Zabolonkov
5	FW	BRA	Pedro Ribeiro

No.	Pos.	Nation	Player
7	FW	RUS	Arser Bagirov
8	FW	RUS	Ivan Milovanov
9	FW	RUS	Yanar Asadov
10	FW	RUS	Artem Niyazov
11	FW	BRA	Ximbinha
27	FW	BRA	Dener
95	FW	RUS	Nikita Ilko
98	FW	RUS	Vladislav Akhukov
99	FW	BLR	Sergey Krykun

== Achievements ==
KPRF

- Russian Futsal Super League
  - (gold) Winners: 2019/2020, 2022/2023
  - (silver) Runner-up: 2018/2019, 2021/2022
  - (bronze) Third place: 2024/2025
- UEFA Futsal Champions League
  - (bronze) Third place: 2019/2020
- Russian Cup
  - (gold) Winners: 2024/2025, 2025/2026
- League Cup
  - (gold) Winners: 2025/2026
- Russian Top League
  - (gold) Winners: 2010/2011

KPRF-2

- Russian Top League
  - (gold) Winners: 2016/2017, 2017/2018, 2020/2021, 2021/2022, 2022/2023, 2023/2024

== League results ==
Season	Division	Place / Playoff
2009/10	Russian Top League (II)	6th
2010/11	Russian Top League (II)	1st
2011/12	Super League (I)	11th
2012/13	Super League (I)	11th
2013/14	Super League (I)	10th
2014/15	Super League (I)	10th
2015/16	Super League (I)	4th / 1/4
2016/17	Super League (I)	7th / 1/4
2017/18	Super League (I)	4th / 1/4
2018/19	Super League (I)	2nd / 2nd
2019/20	Super League (I)	1st / 1st
2020/21	Super League (I)	4th / 4th
2021/22	Super League (I)	5th / 2nd
2022/23	Super League (I)	1st / 1st
2023/24	Super League (I)	5th / 4th
2024/25	Super League (I)	3rd / 3rd

== See also ==
- Communist Party of the Russian Federation
