= Gazprom-Ugra Yugorsk =

Russian futsal club

- Full name: МФК Газпром-Югра; MFC Gazprom-Ugra
- Founded: 1993
- Ground: KSK «Nord» («Yubileyny» Sports Hall) «Ugra Sports Center» «Triumph» Sports Hall (Lyubertsy, Moscow oblast)
- Capacity: 600; 1900; 3500
- Chairman: Petr Sozonov
- Manager: Vladimir Kolesnikov
- League: Superleague
- 2023–24: Superleague, 2 (play-off: 1)
Home colours	Away colours

Gazprom-Ugra Yugorsk (Russian: Мини-футбольный клуб Газпром-Югра; Russian pronunciation: [ɡɐs'prom jʊɡ'ra]) is a futsal club based in Yugorsk, Russia. It was founded in 1992. Today Ugra Yugorsk is competing in the Russian Super League. In the 2014–15 season, Yugra won its first trophy there. A season later they won the UEFA Futsal Cup, defeating Inter Movistar in the final. The club is owned by Russian state-controlled energy company Gazprom.

== Titles ==
- UEFA Futsal Cup: 2015–16
- Russian Championship:
  - (gold) Gold (4): 2014–15, 2017–18, 2021–22, 2023–24
  - (silver) Silver (6): 2007/08, 2012–13, 2013–14, 2015–16, 2019–20, 2024–25
  - (bronze) Bronze (7): 1995/96, 1996/97, 2000/01, 2006/07, 2008/09, 2011–12, 2016–17
- Russian Cup (5): 2011–12, 2015–16, 2017–18, 2018–19, 2020–21
- Russian Super Cup (2): 2022, 2024
- Urals Cup (2): 2001, 2007
- European Futsal Cup Winners Cup: 2012

== Season to season ==
Season	Division	Place / Playoff
1994/95	Major League (2nd Division)	1st
1995/96	Major League (1st Division)	3rd
1996/97	Major League (1st Division)	3rd
1997/98	Major League (1st Division)	4th
1998/99	Major League (1st Division)	7th
1999/00	Major League (1st Division)	6th
2000/01	Major League (1st Division)	3rd
2001/02	Major League (1st Division)	5th / 1/4
2002/03	Major League (1st Division)	2nd / 1/4
2003/04	Super League	8th
2004/05	Super League	5th
2005/06	Super League	7th
2006/07	Super League	3rd
2007/08	Super League	2nd
2008/09	Super League	3rd
2009–10	Super League	4th
2010–11	Super League	3rd / 1/4
2011–12	Super League	6th / 3rd
2012–13	Super League	2nd / 2nd
2013–14	Super League	2nd / 2nd
2014–15	Super League	2nd / 1st
2015–16	Super League	2nd / 2nd
2016–17	Super League	3rd / 3rd
2017–18	Super League	1st / 1st
2018–19	Super League	1st / 1/4
2019–20	Super League	2nd / 2nd
2020–21	Super League	5th / 1/4
2021–22	Super League	7th / 1st
2022–23	Super League	3rd / 4th
2023–24	Super League	2nd / 1st
2024–25	Super League	2nd / 2nd

== Current squad ==
As of 14 September 2022

#	Position	Name	Nationality
1	Goalkeeper	Zviad Kupatadze	(Georgia (country)) / (Russia)
80	Goalkeeper	Aleksey Egin	(Russia)
91	Goalkeeper	Zurab Kalmakhelidze	(Russia)
6	Defender	Vilian	(Georgia (country)) / (Brazil)
10	Defender	Pavel Simakov	(Russia)
13	Defender	Nikolay Shisterov	(Russia)
99	Defender	Igor Chernyavskiy	(Russia)
2	Universal	Rafael Katata	(Russia) / (Brazil)
14	Universal	Aleksandr Pirogov	(Russia)
23	Universal	Daniil Davydov	(Russia)
33	Universal	Ivan Krylov	(Russia)
38	Universal	Chimba	(Brazil)
7	Forward	Andrey Afanasyev	(Russia)
11	Forward	Aleksandr Vinogradov	(Russia)
18	Forward	Andrey Ponkratov	(Russia)
51	Forward	Joao Gilerme	(Armenia) / (Brazil)

== Notable players ==
- (Ukraine) Sergey Koridze
- (Russia) Stanislav Larionov
- (Brazil) / (Russia) Eder Lima

- (Brazil) Serjão
- (Brazil) Tiago
- (Russia) Vladislav Shayakhmetov
- (Brazil) / (Russia) Robinho
