= MFK Dinamo Moskva =

Russian futsal club

MFK Dinamo
- Full name: MFK Dinamo Moscow oblast
- Founded: 2002
- Dissolved: 2020
- Ground: USC Podmoskovye, Shchyolkovo, Moscow oblast, Russia
- Capacity: 1 500
- Manager: Aleksandr Rakhimov
- League: Russian Higher League
- 2019-2020: Higher League; 13
Home colours	Away colours

MFK Dinamo (Russian: МФК «Дина́мо») was a Russian futsal club based in Moscow oblast. Futsal is a variant of association football that is played on a smaller pitch, mainly indoors. It won the UEFA Futsal Cup in 2007.

== History ==
Futsal club Dinamo was founded in 2002. The founder and first president of the club was Konstantin Eremenko, the best futsal player of the twentieth century. Dinamo won its first championship in debut season and held the title of Champion of Russia until 2009. The success was followed by a small decline when the Dinamo managed only silver and bronze in the Russian Super League. In 2011, the club regained the title of the strongest team of Russia. In 2012 and 2013 the title was confirmed. Totally Dinamo won nine league titles at the moment.

The same success achieved in the second largest domestic tournament - the Cup of Russia. Of the ten finals Dinamo won seven. However, the most important trophy for Dinamo became UEFA Cup won in the 2007. Three more times Dinamo played in the finals of this tournament. At the moment, futsal club Dinamo is the most titled club of Russia in XXI century.

== Honours ==
=== International ===
- UEFA Futsal Cup:
  - Winner (1): 2007
- Intercontinental Futsal Cup:
  - Winner (1): 2013

=== National ===
- Russian Super League:
  - Champion (11): 2003, 2004, 2005, 2006, 2007, 2008, 2011, 2012, 2013, 2016, 2017
- Russian Cup:
  - Champion (9): 2003, 2004, 2008, 2009, 2010, 2011, 2013, 2015, 2016
- Russian Super Cup:
  - Champion (1): 2016

== See also ==
- Dinamo-Samara
- FC Dynamo Moscow
