= MFK Sinara Yekaterinburg =

Russian futsal club

Sinara Yekaterinburg
- Full name: Sinara Yekaterinburg
- Founded: 1992
- Ground: Palace of Sports, Yekaterinburg
- Capacity: 5000
- Chairman: Grigori Ivanov
- Manager: Yevgeni Davletshin
- League: Superleague
- 2020-21: Champion,
Home colours	Away colours

Sinara Yekaterinburg (Синара in Russian) is a professional futsal club based in Yekaterinburg, Russia. They had been founded in 1992. They compete in Russian futsal Superliga. Sinara are the champions of UEFA Futsal Cup in 2008.

Because of the 2022 Russian invasion of Ukraine, FIFA and Union of European Football Associations (UEFA) suspended from FIFA and UEFA competitions all Russian teams, whether national representative teams or club teams.

== Titles ==
- Russian champions (3): 2008/09, 2009/10, 2020/21
- UEFA Futsal Cup (1): 2008
- UEFA Futsal Cup finalists (1): 2009
