= MFK Norilsk Nickel =

Russian Futsal Club

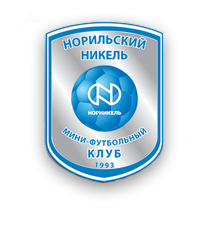
MFK Norilsk Nickel

Norilsky Nickel is a professional futsal club competing in the Russian Futsal Super League.

== Current squad 2024/25 ==
No.	Name	Pos.	Nat.
1	Alexandr Kostromin	Goalkeeper	(Russia)
3	Willian Dorn	Goalkeeper	(Brazil)
30	Nikolay Balashov	Goalkeeper	(Russia)
5	Maxim Konovalov	Pivot	(Russia)
7	Andrey Afanasyev	Pivot	(Russia)
8	Denis Povarov	Field Player	(Russia)
9	Ruslan Kudziev	Pivot	(Russia)
10	Alex Felipe	Pivot	(Brazil)
11	Roman Bukin	Pivot	(Russia)
12	Viktor Leifeld	Field Player	(Russia)
16	Danil Kutuzov	Field Player	(Russia)
17	Alexandr Krutiy	Field Player	(Russia)
18	Danil Davydov	Field Player	(Russia)
19	Alexey Lyalin	Field Player	(Russia)
20	Nando	Defender	(Brazil) / (Russia)
23	Temirlan Alibekov	Field Player	(Russia)
24	Bogdan Silkin	Field Player	(Russia)
47	Lev Selin	Field Player	(Russia)
77	Vladimir Sanosyan	Field Player	(Russia) / (Armenia)
90	Renat Shakirov	Pivot	(Russia)
91	Vladislav Yakovlev	Field Player	(Russia)

== Honours ==
=== National ===
Russian Super League (1)

- Champion: 2001-02

Russian Futsal Cup (2)

- Champion: 2019-20, 2023-24
