= MFK Tyumen =

Russian futsal club

Tyumen
- Full name: MFK Tyumen
- Founded: 22 February 1999; 26 years ago
- Ground: Central, Tyumen
- Capacity: 1,862
- Chairman: Aleksandr Popov
- Coach: Maksim Gorbunov
- League: Super League
- 2019-2020: Superleague; 4 (play-off: 4)
Home colours	Away colours

MFK Tyumen (Russian: мини-футбольный клуб Тюмень) is a professional futsal club based in Tyumen, Russia. Founded in 1999, the club competes in the Russian Futsal Super League since 2003–04.

Because of the 2022 Russian invasion of Ukraine, FIFA and Union of European Football Associations (UEFA) suspended from FIFA and UEFA competitions all Russian teams, whether national representative teams or club teams.

== Current squad ==
As of 5 March 2023

#	Position	Name	Nationality
1	Goalkeeper	Denis Subbotin	(Russia)
22	Goalkeeper	Ilya Chibulaev	(Russia)
70	Goalkeeper	Kirill Sukhanov	(Russia)
8	Defender	Aleksandr Upalev	(Russia)
15	Defender	Andrey Sokolov	(Russia)
28	Defender	Alisson	(Brazil)
84	Defender	Maksim Emelyanov	(Russia)
5	Winger	Giorgi Ghavtadze	(Georgia (country))
6	Winger	Georgy Sorokin	(Russia)
11	Winger	Kamil Gereykhanov	(Russia)
14	Winger	Artem Antoshkin	(Russia)
21	Winger	Idris Yorov	(Tajikistan)
12	Pivot	Andrey Batyrev	(Russia)
17	Pivot	Shokhrukh Makhmadaminov	(Kyrgyzstan)
80	Pivot	Denis Nevedrov	(Armenia)
93	Pivot	Rafael Vilela	(Azerbaijan)

== Achievements ==
- Russian Futsal Super League
  - (gold) Winners: 2018/2019
  - (silver) Runner-up: 2009/2010, 2020/2021
  - (bronze) Third place: 2012/2013, 2017/2018

== League results ==
Season	Division	Place / Playoff
1999/00	Russian Higher League	5th
2000/01	Russian Higher League	1st
2001/02	Super League	13th
2002/03	Super League	9th
2003/04	Super League	9th
2004/05	Super League	10th
2005/06	Super League	10th
2006/07	Super League	6th
2007/08	Super League	4th
2008/09	Super League	4th
2009/10	Super League	2nd
2010/11	Super League	6th / 4th
2011/12	Super League	3rd / 1/4
2012/13	Super League	6th / 3rd
2013/14	Super League	4th / 1/4
2014/15	Super League	6th / 4th
2015/16	Super League	3rd / 4th
2016/17	Super League	6th / 1/4
2017/18	Super League	3rd / 3rd
2018/19	Super League	4th / 1st
2019/20	Super League	4th / 4th
2020/21	Super League	3rd / 2nd
