= 2015–16 Serie A (futsal) =

Serie A
- Season: 2015–16
- Champions: Asti
- Relegated: CosenzaLazio
- UEFA Futsal Cup: Asti
- Biggest home win: 8-0 Pescara-Latina (Rd.16)
- Biggest away win: 0-10 Lazio-Kaos (Rd.22)
- Highest scoring: 6-10; Latina-Real Rieti (Rd. 1); Napoli-Asti (Rd.2)
- Longest winning run: 10 matches Asti
- Longest unbeaten run: 13 matches Asti
- Longest winless run: 13 matches Napoli
- Longest losing run: 7 matches Napoli

The 2015–16 season of the Serie A is the 33rd season of top-tier futsal in Italy, 27th known as Serie A, which began September 19, 2015 and will finish on April 16, 2016. At the end of the regular season the top eight teams will play in the championship playoffs. The quarter and semi-finals will be a best of three series and the final will be a best of five-game series. The champions will then be Italy's representative in the 2016–17 UEFA Futsal Cup. With 13 teams participating this season the last place team will automatically be relegated to Serie A2 and the twelfth and eleventh placed teams will have a two-legged playoff to determine the second team to be relegated.

== Events ==
Theisis the first Serie A championship to have 13 teams to play for the Scudetto. This season is the return of Montesilvano after two seasons of absence. They are the current record holder for appearances in the top flight (22 seasons). The city of Montesilvano will have the only derby of the season, which will see the seagulls opposite Acqua e Sapone. Cosenza and Carlisport Cogianco are making their debut in Serie A. Fabrizio has also changed its name and colors, becoming "FC5 Corigliano Futsal" to better represent the city of Corigliano Calabro.

=== Schedule Breaks ===
The Divisione Calcio a 5 has published the calendar of the championship on August 12. The season will break on December 5 through 12 for the World Cup qualifiers. January 23 to February 13 for the finals of the European Championship which will be played in Serbia. March 5 for the final eight of the Coppa Italia. March 19 and April 9 for the home and away play-off qualifiers for the World Cup in 2016 in Colombia.

=== Penalty ===
This season the Pescara reflects the downgrade of 1 point in the standings from the National Federal Court in the previous season for the delay of payments to its own cardholder.

=== Cosenza Excluded ===
In accepting the irrevocable resignation of its president and legal representative, on October 12, 2015, Futsal Cosenza decided the cessation of the championship with immediate effect. Since exclusion was made during the fourth round, all the matches played by the team do not count towards the league table. The team was also fined the maximum penalty by law, (30,000.00 Euros), for having seriously affected the performance of the entire season.

== 2015-16 Season teams ==
Team	Location	Stadium	Capacity	2014-15 Season
Acqua e Sapone	Montesilvano	Pala Roma	1,540	4th in Serie A, semi-finalist
Asti	Asti	Pala San Quirico	1,000	3rd in Serie A, quarter-finalist
Carlisport Cogianco	Ariccia	PalaCesaroni	3,000	2nd in Serie A2 group B
Corigliano	Corigliano Calabro	PalaCorigliano	3,000	10th in Serie A
Cosenza	Cosenza	Palaferraro	1,200	1st in Serie A2 group B
Kaos	Ferrara	Palasport di Ferrara	3,504	6th in Serie A, beaten finalist
Latina	Latina	PalaSport Nicola Bianchini	2,500	8th in Serie A, quarter-finalist
Lazio	Rome	Futsal Arena	1,000	7th in Serie A, quarter-finalist
Luparense	San Martino di Lupari	PalaBruel	1,200	2nd in Serie A, semi-finalist
Montesilvano	Montesilvano	Pala Roma	1,540	1st in Serie A2 group A
Napoli	Naples	Federazione Italiana Pallavolo		9th in Serie A
Pescara	Pescara	PalaRigopiano	1,500	1st in Serie A, Champion
Real Rieti	Rieti	Pala Malfatti		5th in Serie A, quarter-finalist

== Regular season table ==
Pos	Team	Pld	W	D	L	GF	GA	GD	Pts	Qualification
1	Asti	22	13	8	1	96	61	+35	47	Advanced to Quarter-finals
2	Pescara	22	12	6	4	85	56	+29	41 (Note: 1 point penalty)	Advanced to Quarter-finals
3	Real Rieti	22	12	5	5	88	76	+12	41	Advanced to Quarter-finals
4	Kaos	22	9	7	6	83	65	+18	34	Advanced to Quarter-finals
5	Acqua e Sapone	22	9	7	6	75	66	+9	34	Advanced to Quarter-finals
6	Montesilvano	22	8	7	7	78	65	+13	31	Advanced to Quarter-finals
7	Luparense	22	9	4	9	75	85	−10	31	Advanced to Quarter-finals
8	Carlisport Cogianco	22	8	6	8	72	60	+12	30	Advanced to Quarter-finals
9	Latina	22	8	3	11	71	83	−12	27	
10	Corigliano	22	5	4	13	69	112	−43	19	
11	Lazio	22	3	5	14	50	87	−37	14	Relegation playoffs
12	Napoli	22	3	4	15	76	102	−26	13	Relegation playoffs
13	Cosenza (Note: Excluded from the championship in the 4th round.)	0	0	0	0	0	0	0	0	Excluded

Updated to match(es) played on 16 April 2016. Source: Divisione Calcio a 5 – Serie A
Rules for classification: Rules for classification: 1) points; 2) head-to-head points; 3) head-to-head goal difference; 4) goal difference; 5) number of goals scored

=== Cosenza Games ===
Cosenza is excluded from playing in the championship with immediate effect (Round 4). The games held previously by the team were not considered valid for ranking. In the remaining league games, the team that would face Cosenza will now have a bye.

=== Calendar and results ===
Rd. 1		1st Match	Rd. 14
18 Sept.	6-10	Latina-Real Rieti	1-4	19 Dec.
19 Sept.	3-3	Acqua&Sapone-Napoli	5-5	19 Dec.
19 Sept.	7-3	Asti-Luparense	8-5	19 Dec.
19 Sept.	3-3	Carlisport Cogianco-Montesilvano	5-5	19 Dec.
19 Sept.	6-5	Corigliano-Kaos	3-5	19 Dec.
19 Sept.	1-2	Lazio-Pescara	0-7	19 Dec.
19 Sept.		Bye: Cosenza		19 Dec.

Rd. 2		2nd Match	Rd. 15
25 Sept.	3-1	Luparense-Lazio	2-0	29 Dec.
25 Sept.	5-5	Pescara-Corigliano	5-2	29 Dec.
26 Sept.	4-3	Kaos-Latina	2-3	29 Dec.
26 Sept.	3-6	Montesilvano-Cosenza	n/a	29 Dec.
26 Sept.	6-10	Napoli-Asti	1-2	29 Dec.
27 Sept.	0-3	Real Rieti-Carlisport Cogianco	5-3	29 Dec.
27 Sept.		Bye: Acqua&Sapone		29 Dec.

Rd. 3		3rd Match	Rd. 16
2 Oct.	3-3	Asti-Acqua&Sapone	3-1	5 Jan.
4 Oct.	1-1	Lazio-Napoli	2-5	5 Jan.
4 Oct.	6-3	Corigliano-Luparense	2-6	5 Jan.
4 Oct.	1-3	Cosenza-Real Rieti	n/a	5 Jan.
4 Oct.	3-3	Carlisport Cogianco-Kaos	2-2	4 Jan.
13 Oct.	3-4	Latina-Pescara	0-8	4 Jan.
13 Oct.		Bye: Montesilvano		4 Jan.

Rd. 4		4th Match	Rd. 17
10 Oct.	2-4	Luparense-Latina	5-2	8 Jan.
10 Oct.	4-4	Real Rieti-Montesilvano	2-1	9 Jan.
10 Oct.	n/a	Kaos-Cosenza	n/a	10 Jan.
10 Oct.	4-5	Napoli-Corigliano	8-2	10 Jan.
10 Oct.	4-2	Pescara-Carlisport Cogianco	3-2	10 Jan.
10 Oct.	2-0	Acqua&Sapone-Lazio	4-3	10 Jan.
10 Oct.		Bye: Asti		10 Jan.

Rd. 5		5th Match	Rd. 18
17 Oct.	6-1	Carlisport Cogianco-Luparense	2-3	16 Jan.
17 Oct.	0-8	Corigliano-Acqua&Sapone	5-6	16 Jan.
17 Oct.	n/a	Cosenza-Pescara	n/a	16 Jan.
17 Oct.	6-3	Latina-Napoli	4-3	16 Jan.
17 Oct.	1-1	Lazio-Asti	3-5	16 Jan.
17 Oct.	6-0	Montesilvano-Kaos	4-7	16 Jan.
17 Oct.		Bye: Real Rieti		16 Jan.

Rd. 6		6th Match	Rd. 19
24 Oct.	4-1	Acqua&Sapone-Latina	4-3	20 Jan.
24 Oct.	4-4	Asti-Corigliano	5-1	20 Jan.
24 Oct.	2-4	Kaos-Real Rieti	4-1	20 Jan.
24 Oct.	n/a	Luparense-Cosenza	n/a	20 Jan.
24 Oct.	2-4	Napoli-Carlisport Cogianco	1-6	20 Jan.
24 Oct.	1-3	Pescara-Montesilvano	3-3	20 Jan.
24 Oct.		Bye: Lazio		20 Jan.

Rd. 7		7th Match	Rd. 20
27 Oct.	2-1	Carlisport Cogianco-Acqua&Sapone	2-3	19 Feb.
27 Oct.	6-6	Corigliano-Lazio	2-7	19 Feb.
27 Oct.	n/a	Cosenza-Napoli	n/a	19 Feb.
27 Oct.	4-4	Latina-Asti	3-6	19 Feb.
27 Oct.	7-2	Montesilvano-Luparense	3-5	19 Feb.
27 Oct.	4-4	Real Rieti-Pescara	2-4	19 Feb.
27 Oct.		Bye: Kaos		19 Feb.

Rd. 8		8th Match	Rd. 21
31 Oct.	n/a	Acqua&Sapone-Cosenza	n/a	26 Feb.
31 Oct.	4-4	Asti-Carlisport Cogianco	4-2	26 Feb.
31 Oct.	3-5	Lazio-Latina	2-4	26 Feb.
31 Oct.	2-5	Luparense-Real Rieti	2-3	26 Feb.
31 Oct.	3-5	Napoli-Montesilvano	5-3	26 Feb.
31 Oct.	3-1	Pescara-Kaos	5-5	26 Feb.
31 Oct.		Bye: Corigliano		26 Feb.

Rd. 9		9th Match	Rd. 22
7 Nov.	2-3	Carlisport Cogianco-Lazio	5-4	11 Mar.
7 Nov.	n/a	Cosenza-Asti	n/a	11 Mar.
7 Nov.	4-1	Kaos-Luparense	4-4	11 Mar.
7 Nov.	7-1	Latina-Corigliano	3-4	11 Mar.
7 Nov.	1-2	Montesilvano-Acqua&Sapone	4-3	11 Mar.
7 Nov.	6-4	Real Rieti-Napoli	6-5	11 Mar.
7 Nov.		Bye: Pescara		11 Mar.

Rd. 10		10th Match	Rd. 23
14 Nov.	4-3	Acqua&Sapone-Real Rieti	3-3	26 Mar.
14 Nov.	3-4	Asti-Montesilvano	2-1	26 Mar.
14 Nov.	2-4	Corigliano-Carlisport Cogianco	1-6	26 Mar.
14 Nov.	n/a	Lazio-Cosenza	n/a	26 Mar.
14 Nov.	3-3	Luparense-Pescara	3-2	26 Mar.
14 Nov.	3-6	Napoli-Kaos	2-4	26 Mar.
14 Nov.		Bye: Latina		26 Mar.

Rd. 11		11th Match	Rd. 24
21 Nov.	3-5	Carlisport Cogianco-Latina	1-1	2 Apr.
21 Nov.	n/a	Cosenza-Corigliano	n/a	2 Apr.
21 Nov.	5-2	Kaos-Acqua&Sapone	4-4	2 Apr.
21 Nov.	8-2	Montesilvano-Lazio	2-2	2 Apr.
21 Nov.	6-1	Pescara-Napoli	6-3	2 Apr.
21 Nov.	4-4	Real Rieti-Asti	3-9	2 Apr.
21 Nov.		Bye: Luparense		2 Apr.

Rd. 12		12th Match	Rd. 25
28 Nov.	2-3	Acqua&Sapone-Pescara	3-3	5 Apr.
28 Nov.	3-3	Asti-Kaos	1-1	5 Apr.
28 Nov.	4-4	Corigliano-Montesilvano	3-1	5 Apr.
28 Nov.	n/a	Latina-Cosenza	n/a	5 Apr.
28 Nov.	2-5	Lazio-Real Rieti	4-4	5 Apr.
28 Nov.	4-4	Napoli-Luparense	4-6	5 Apr.
28 Nov.		Bye: Carlisport Cogianco		5 Apr.

Rd. 13		13th Match	Rd. 26
2 Dec.	n/a	Cosenza-Carlisport Cogianco	n/a	16 Apr.
2 Dec.	2-3	Kaos-Lazio	10-0	16 Apr.
2 Dec.	6-6	Luparense-Acqua&Sapone	4-2	16 Apr.
2 Dec.	3-1	Montesilvano-Latina	3-3	16 Apr.
2 Dec.	3-4	Pescara-Asti	1-4	16 Apr.
2 Dec.	3-2	Real Rieti-Corigliano	7-3	16 Apr.
2 Dec.		Bye: Napoli		16 Apr.

== Regular season top scorers ==
#	Player	Club	Goals
1	Kaka	Kaos	28
1	Zanchetta	Real Rieti	28
2	Jonas	Acqua e Sapone	20
3	Vieira	Carlisport Cogianco	19
4	Bordignon	Montesilvano	18
4	Hector	Real Rieti	18
5	De Oliveira	Asti	17
5	Rosa	Montesilvano	17
6	Maluko	Real Rieti	16
7	Bertoni	Asti	15
7	Maina	Latina	15
7	Fornari	Napoli	15
7	Waltinho	Carlisport Cogianco	15
8	Crema	Asti	14
8	Lemine	Corigliano	14

== Relegation playoff ==
=== 1st leg ===
April 30, 2016	Napoli	5-3	Lazio	Naples
18:00	Fornari 13', 30', 39'; De Bail 34'; Bolo 39'	Report	Pol Pacheco 3'; Nardacchione 21'; Perri 34'	Stadium: Federazione Italiana Pallavolo

=== 2nd leg ===
May 7, 2016	Lazio	1-5	Napoli	Rome
18:00	Juninho 15'	Report	Bolo 8'; Milucci 28'; De Bail 31'; Javi Rodriguez 32', 35'	Stadium: Futsal Arena

- Napoli wins 10–4 on aggregate and remains in Serie A. Lazio is relegated to Serie A2.

== Championship playoffs ==
=== Calendar ===
Round	Date	Fixtures	Clubs	Notes
Quarter-finals	30 April 5/6/7 May 2016	8	8 → 4	
Semifinals	12/17/19 May 2016	4	4 → 2	
Final	25/30 May 1/7/9 June	3	2 → 1	

=== Bracket ===
Quarter-finals
1	Asti	4	5	3
8	Carlisport Cogianco	6	0	3
4	Kaos	1	2
5	Acqua e Sapone	1	5
2	Pescara	4	6	3
7	Luparense	5	1	4
3	Real Rieti	7	5
6	Montesilvano	2	5

Semifinals
1	Asti	2	4	2
5	Acqua e Sapone	4	2	1
3	Real Rieti	2	4	4
7	Luparense	5	3	2

Final
1	Asti	1	1 (2)	3	4 (3)
3	Real Rieti	2	1 (1)	2	4 (2)

=== Quarter-finals ===
==== 1st match ====
April 29, 2016	Kaos	1-1	Acqua e Sapone	Montesilvano
21:00	Vinicius 11'	Report	Schiochet 37'	Stadium: Pala Roma

April 29, 2016	Asti	4-6	Carlisport Cogianco	Ariccia
21:00	De Luca 7' (own); Bocao 24' (own); De Oliveira 29', 39'; Ramon 32'; Nora 34'	Report	Waltinho 27', 29'; Ruben 34'; Vieira 39'	Stadium: PalaCesaroni

April 30, 2016	Pescara	4-5	Luparense	San Martino di Lupari
18:00	Lara 25'; Betao 30'; Ercolessi 33'; Salas 36'	Report	Honorio 3'; Leitao 6', 22'; Taborda 20'; Giasson 39'	Stadium: PalaBruel

April 30, 2016	Real Rieti	7-2	Montesilvano	Montesilvano
20:00	Rafinha 8'; Ghiotti 17', 25'; Saul 20', 36'; Hector 29', 36'	Report	Bordignon 24'; Burato 31'	Stadium: PalaRoma

==== 2nd match ====
May 4, 2016	Acqua e Sapone	5-2	Kaos	Ferrara
20:00	Burrito 5', 38'; Mammarella 10' (own); Jonas 18'; Murilo 28', 37'	Report	Tuli 10'	Stadium: Palasport di Ferrara

May 4, 2016	Carlisport Cogianco	0-5	Asti	Asti
20:30	Ruben 19' (own)	Report	Crema 15', 28'; Bertoni 37'; Nora 39'	Stadium: Pala San Quirico

May 5, 2016	Luparense	1-6	Pescara	Pescara
20:00	Bissoni 17'	Report	Caputo 7'; Leggiero 15'; Grello 17', 24'; Cuzzolino 18' (pen.); Rogerio 40'	Stadium: PalaRigopiano

May 5, 2016	Montesilvano	5-5	Real Rieti	Rieti
20:15	Burato 11'; Hozjan 13'; Morgado 37'; Francini 39'	Report	Hector 3', 9' (pen.) 38' (own); Zanchetta 13', 19', 40'	Stadium: Pala Malfatti

==== 3rd Match ====
May 6, 2016	Carlisport Cogianco	3-3 (a.e.t)	Asti	Asti
20:45	Ruben 32'; Brizzi 38'; Vieira 47'	Report	De Oliveira 5'; Ramon 25'; Nora 42'	Stadium: Pala San Quirico

May 7, 2016	Luparense	4-3	Pescara	Pescara
20:45	Honorio 1'; Giasson 3'; Foglia 36'; Leitao 38'	Report	Rescia 12'; Betao 24'; Rogerio 38'	Stadium: PalaRigopiano

=== Semi-finals ===
==== 1st match ====
May 12, 2016	Asti	2-4	Acqua e Sapone	Montesilvano
20:00	Ramon 16'; Bertoni 27'	Report	Paulinho 5'; Burrito 7', 39'; Jonas 20'	Stadium: Pala Roma

May 12, 2016	Real Rieti	2-5	Luparense	San Martino di Lupari
20:45	Zanchetta 4'; Maluko 6'	Report	Foglia 14', 21'; Bissoni 31', 35'; Leitao 36'	Stadium: PalaBruel

==== 2nd match ====
May 17, 2016	Acqua e Sapone	2-4	Asti	Asti
20:45	Mimi 25'; Jonas 39'	Report	Crema 27', 28'; Chimanguinho 37'; Bertoni 40'	Stadium: Pala San Quirico

May 17, 2016	Luparense	3-4	Real Rieti	Rieti
20:30	Foglia 20'; Moura 22'; Honorio 37'	Report	Rafinha 4', 23'; Ghiotti 12'; Saul 20'	Stadium: Pala Malfatti

==== 3rd match ====
May 19, 2016	Acqua e Sapone	1-2	Asti	Asti
20:00	Jonas 36'	Report	Nora 20'; Chimanguinho 32'	Stadium: Pala San Quirico

May 19, 2016	Luparense	2-4	Real Rieti	Rieti
20:00	Ique 27'	Report	Corsini 6'; Zanchetta 10'; Saul 28' 33' (own); Hector 40'	Stadium: Pala Malfatti

=== Final ===
==== 1st match ====
May 25, 2016	Real Rieti	2-1	Asti	Asti
20:45	Hector 22'; Zanchetta 38'	Report	Romano 29'	Stadium: Pala San Quirico

==== 2nd match ====
May 30, 2016	Asti	1-1 (a.e.t) (2 – 1 p)	Real Rieti	Teramo
20:45	Duarte 26'	Report	Hector 40'	Stadium: Pala San Quirico
	Penalties
	De Oliveira (penalty missed); Bertoni (penalty scored); Duarte (penalty scored)		Hector (penalty scored); Rafinha (penalty missed); Saul (penalty missed)

==== 3rd match ====
June 1, 2016	Asti	3-2	Real Rieti	Teramo
20:45	Nora 14'; Romano 29'; Bertoni 37'	Report	Ghiotti 13'; Hector 26'	Stadium: Pala San Quirico

==== 4th match ====
June 7, 2016	Real Rieti	4-4 (a.e.t) (2 – 3 p)	Asti	Asti
20:45	Zanchetta 1', 37', 40'; Hector 40'	Report	De Oliveira 7'; De Luca 14'; Chimanguinho 31'; Bertoni 36'	Stadium: Pala San Quirico; Attendance: 2,000
	Penalties
	Zanchetta (penalty scored); Jeffe (penalty scored); Hector (penalty missed)		Bertoni (penalty scored); Romano (penalty scored); Ramon (penalty scored)

=== Champion ===
2015–16 Serie A1 winners
(Piedmont)
Asti
First title
