= 2013–14 Serie A (futsal) =

Serie A1
- Season: 2013–14
- Champions: Luparense
- Relegated: Marca Futsal
- UEFA Futsal Cup: Luparense
- Top goalscorer: Paulinho (LCF Martina)-29

The 2013–14 season of the Serie A1 was the 29th season of top-tier futsal in Italy, which began October 5, 2013 and finished on April 18, 2014. At the end of the regular season the top eight teams played in the championship playoffs. The bottom two clubs played in a two-leg playoff to see who was relegated to Serie A2.

== League table ==
Pos	Team	Pld	W	D	L	GF	GA	GD	Pts	Qualification
1	Asti c5	18	9	8	1	80	45	+35	35	Playoff
2	Acqua e Sapone	18	8	7	3	88	53	+35	31	Playoff
3	Kaos Futsal Bologna	18	7	8	3	73	47	+26	29	Playoff
4	Luparense	18	8	5	5	69	46	+23	29	Playoff
5	Real Rieti	18	8	2	8	62	59	+3	26	Playoff
6	Lazio	18	6	6	6	86	67	+19	24	Playoff
7	Pescara	18	6	3	9	63	60	+3	21	Playoff
8	LCF Martina	18	5	4	9	81	71	+10	19	Playoff
9	Napoli	18	5	2	11	65	70	−5	17	Playout
10	Marca Futsal	18	4	3	11	37	186	−149	15	Playout

Updated to match(es) played on April 18, 2014. Source:

== Relegation playoff ==
=== 1st leg ===
May 3, 2014	Marca	1-7	Napoli
20:00 (UTC+2)	Crepaldi 39'	Report	Melucci 3' (pen.); Bertoni 6'; Lucho Gonzalez 8', 26'; Galetto 29' (own); Abdala 11', 33'

=== 2nd leg ===
May 10, 2014	Napoli	9-0	Marca
15:30	Evandro 5', 7'; Lucho Gonzalez 6', 15'; Abdala 8', 24'; Canneva 10'; Galletto 12'	Report

Napoli won 16–1 on aggregate and Napoli will remain in Serie A1 for the 2014-2015 season. Marca is relegated to Serie A2.

== Championship playoffs ==
=== Calendar ===
Round	Date	Fixtures	Clubs	Notes
Quarter-finals	3/8/9 May 2014	8	8 → 4	
Semifinals	15/20/22 May 2014	4	4 → 2	
Final	28 May, 2/4/9/11 June 2014	3	2 → 1	

=== Bracket ===
Quarter-finals
1	Asti c5	4	7
8	LCF Martina	2	2
4	Luparense	3	2
5	Real Rieti	1	2
2	Aqua e Sapone	3	2	7
7	Pescara	3	2	2
3	Kaos	2	4
6	Lazio	4	4

Semifinals
1	Asti	2	5
4	Luparense	4	5
2	Aqua e Sapone	4	5	10
6	Lazio	5	3	1

Final
2	Aqua e Sapone	6	0	3	2 (6)	3
4	Luparense	2	1	4	2 (4)	5

2013–14 Serie A1 winners
(Veneto)
Luparense
Fifth title

=== Top scorers ===
Rank	Player	Club	Goals
1	Paulo Jose Pinto Paulinho	LCF Martina	29
2	Dos Santo da Silva Augusto "Kaka"	Kaos Futsal Bologna	18
3	Juliao Ferreira Murilo	Acqua e Sapone	16
3	Mauro Canal	Luparense	16
3	Pinto Junior Jonas	Asti c5	16
4	Fabricio Calderolli	Acqua e Sapone	15
4	Zemuner Trinidada Davi'	Real Rieti	15
