= 2014–15 Serie A (futsal) =

Serie A
- Season: 2014–15
- Champions: Pescara
- Relegated: Sestu
- UEFA Futsal Cup: Pescara
- Biggest home win: Luparense 8-1 Lazio; Kaos 9-2 Sestu
- Biggest away win: Fabrizio 1-7 Asti; Acqua e Sapone 0-6 Sestu; Napoli 3-9 Real Rieti
- Highest scoring: Filippo Maria Del Grosso (41 goals)

The 2014–15 season of the Serie A is the 30th season of top-tier futsal in Italy, which began September 27, 2014 and will finish on April 18, 2015. At the end of the regular season the top eight teams will play in the championship playoffs. The quarter and semi-finals will be a best of three series and the final will be a best of five-game series. The bottom two clubs will play in a two-leg playoff (home and away) to see who is relegated to Serie A2.

== 2014-15 Season teams ==
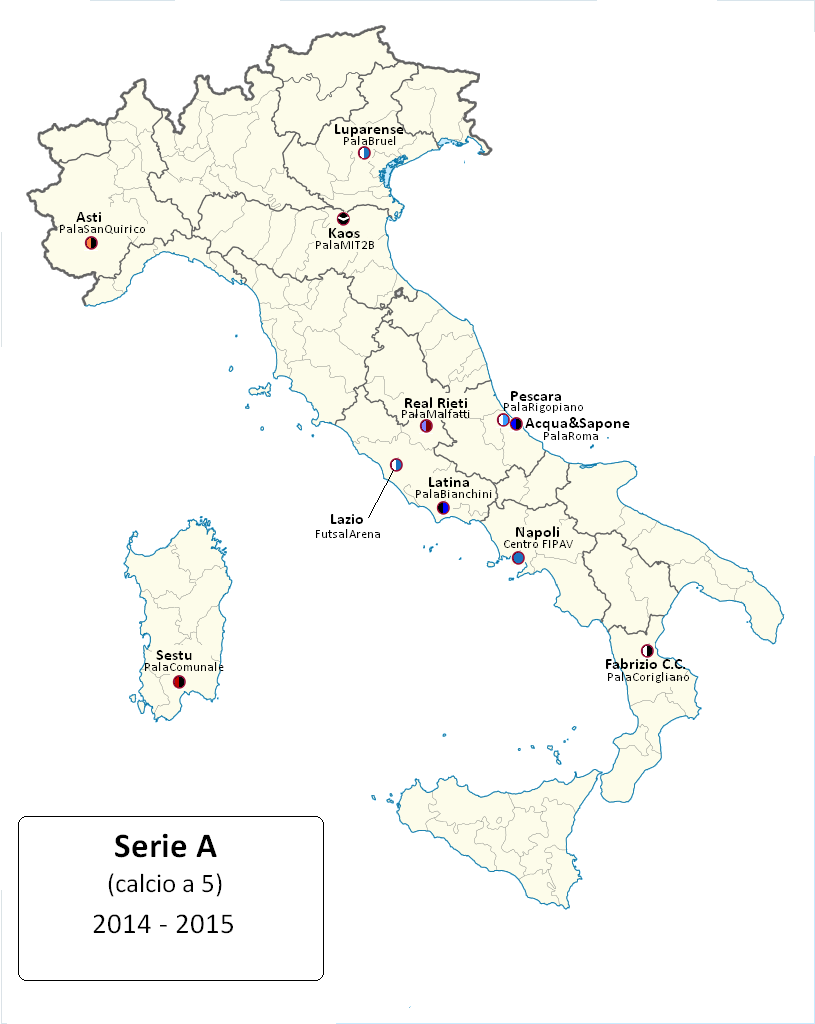

Team	Location	Stadium	Capacity	2013-14 Season
Acqua e Sapone	Montesilvano	Pala Roma	1,540	2nd in Serie A, beaten finalist
Asti	Asti	Pala San Quirico	1,000	1st in Serie A, semi-finalist
Fabrizio	Corigliano Calabro	Pala Corigliano	3,000	2nd in Serie A2 group B
Kaos	Ferrara	Palasport di Ferrara	3,504	3rd in Serie A, quarter-finalist
Latina	Latina	PalaSport Nicola Bianchini	2,500	1st in Serie A2 group B
Lazio	Rome	Futsal Arena	1,000	6th in Serie A, semi-finalist
Luparense	San Martino di Lupari	PalaBruel	1,200	4th in Serie A, Champions
Napoli	Naples	Federazione Italiana Pallavolo		9th in Serie A, won relegation playoff
Pescara	Pescara	PalaRigopiano	1,500	7th in Serie A, Quarter-finalist
Real Rieti	Rieti	Pala Malfatti		5th in Serie A, quarter-finalist
Sestu	Sestu	Palasport comunale		2nd in Serie A2, won promotion playoff

== Regular season table ==
Pos	Team	Pld	W	D	L	GF	GA	GD	Pts	Qualification or relegation
1	Pescara	20	11	5	4	69	48	+21	38	Playoff
2	Luparense	20	11	5	4	80	57	+23	38	Playoff
3	Asti	20	9	6	5	71	48	+23	33	Playoff
4	Acqua e Sapone	20	8	7	5	62	57	+5	31	Playoff
5	Real Rieti	20	7	9	4	90	78	+12	30	Playoff
6	Kaos	20	9	3	8	74	60	+14	30	Playoff
7	Lazio	20	9	3	8	73	76	−3	29 (Note: 1 point penalty)	Playoff
8	Latina	20	7	1	12	57	69	−12	22	Playoff
9	Napoli	20	5	4	11	57	80	−23	19	
10	Fabrizio	20	5	3	12	53	84	−31	18	Playout
11	Sestu	20	2	8	10	48	77	−29	14	Playout

Updated to match(es) played on 19 April 2015. Source: Divisione Calcio a 5 – Serie A
Rules for classification: Rules for classification: 1) points; 2) head-to-head points; 3) head-to-head goal difference; 4) goal difference; 5) number of goals scored

== Fixture table ==
Home \ Away	ACQ	AST	FAB	KAO	LAT	LAZ	LUP	NAP	PES	RIE	SES
Acqua e Sapone		2–2	6–1	4–2	5–2	4–3	3–3	5–4	3–1	4–3	0–6
Asti	5–2		2–0	1–3	4–4	0–2	5–2	3–0	3–4	3–3	6–1
Fabrizio	3–2	1–7		2–3	5–1	7–5	1–1	2–2	1–7	5–4	3–3
Kaos	2–2	1–5	6–2		3–1	3–2	5–5	3–4	4–1	4–5	9–2
Latina	2–3	4–7	4–1	4–3		2–4	1–2	7–3	2–4	5–3	4–0
Lazio	2–1	3–5	5–8	5–2	6–1		4–2	6–5	3–3	4–4	7–2
Luparense	3–2	4–4	6–0	5–4	5–3	8–1		6–1	5–6	3–2	3–1
Napoli	3–3	2–1	3–2	2–7	1–2	3–4	2–4		5–3	3–9	7–2
Pescara	3–3	2–0	5–0	1–4	3–1	6–0	2–1	5–1		3–3	2–2
Real Rieti	6–6	5–5	9–7	5–4	4–1	6–4	6–6	3–3	5–5		3–1
Sestu	2–2	3–3	3–2	2–2	3–7	3–3	4–6	3–3	2–3	2–2	

Legend: Blue = home team win; Yellow = draw; Red = away team win.

== Relegation playoff ==
=== 1st leg ===
May 2, 2015	Sestu	3-4	Fabrizio
	Rocha 5', 10', 28'	Report	Urio 10', 35'; Viera 33', 36'

=== 2nd leg ===
May 9, 2015	Fabrizio	4-2	Sestu	Corigliano Calabro
20:00	Vieira 35', 36', 40'; De Luca 39'	Report	Rocha 22'; Nurchi 29'	Stadium: Pala Corigliano

- Fabrizio wins 8–5 on aggregate and remains in Serie A. Sestu is relegated to Serie A2.

== Championship playoffs ==
=== Calendar ===
Round	Date	Clubs	Notes
Quarter-finals	2/3, 7/8, 9/10 May 2015	8 → 4	
Semifinals	15/20/22 May 2015	4 → 2	
Final	28 May, 3/5/11/13 June 2015	2 → 1	

=== Bracket ===
Quarter-finals
1	Pescara	3	4	7
8	Latina	4	1	2
4	Acqua e Sapone	4	1	6
5	Real Rieti	3	2	1
3	Asti	2	4	3
6	Kaos	4	3	4
2	Luparense	5	3
7	Lazio	4	2

Semifinals
1	Pescara	3	7
4	Acqua e Sapone	3	3
6	Kaos	2	3	5
2	Luparense	1	7	3

Final
1	Pescara	5	4	2 (3)	1 (3)
6	Kaos	3	3	2 (4)	1 (2)

=== Quarter-finals ===
==== 1st leg ====
May 2, 2015	Latina	4-3	Pescara	Latina, Lazio
20:45	Maina 9'; Battistoni 12'; Terenzi 20'; Bacaro 40'	Report	Rescia 22', 23'; Canal 34'	Stadium: PalaSport Nicola Bianchini

May 2, 2015	Lazio	4-5	Luparense	Rome
20:00	Saul 6'; Paulinho 15', 33', 34'	Report	Nora 14'; Waltinho 19', 31'; Taborda 21'; Giasson 28'	Stadium: Futsal Arena

May 1, 2015	Kaos	4-2	Asti	Ferrara
19:00	Tuli 2'; Bertoni 4'; Vinicius 5'; Espindola 5'	Report	Ramon 12' (pen.); Duarte 12'	Stadium: Palasport di Ferrara

May 2, 2015	Real Rieti	3-4	Acqua e Sapone	Rieti
21:00	Zanchetta 6', 37', 38'	Report	De Oliveira 4'; Murilo 9'; Cavinato 13'; Leitao 27'	Stadium: Pala Malfatti

==== 2nd leg ====
May 7, 2015	Acqua e Sapone	1-2	Real Rieti	Montesilvano
20:00	Cuzzolino 23'	Report	Suazo 34'; Lemine 39'	Stadium: Pala Roma

May 7, 2015	Asti	4-3	Kaos	Asti
20:00	Fortino 3', 36', 40'; Follador 7' (own); Ramon 11'	Report	Coco 18'; Pedotti 40'	Stadium: Pala San Quirico

May 8, 2015	Luparense	3-2	Lazio	San Martino di Lupari
20:00	Waltinho 19'; Nora 40'; Mauricio 40'	Report	De Bail 14'; Manfroi 27'	Stadium: PalaBruel

May 8, 2015	Pescara	4-1	Latina	Pescara
20:30	Salas 15'; Canal 23'; Rescia 28', 36'	Report	Lara 31'	Stadium: PalaRigopiano

==== 3rd leg ====
May 9, 2015	Asti	3-4	Kaos	Asti
20:00	Chimanguinho 8'; Fortino 15'; Ramon 32'	Report	Halimi 17'; Espindola 28'; Bertoni 30' (pen.) 34'	Stadium: Pala San Quirico

May 9, 2015	Acqua e Sapone	6-1	Real Rieti	Montesilvano
20:00	De Oliveira 28'; Cavinato 29'; Cuzzolino 34', 40'; Mammarella 36'; Caetano 39'	Report	Jeffe 14'	Stadium: Pala Roma

May 10, 2015	Pescara	7-2	Latina	Pescara
20:00	Ercolessi 6', 14'; Nicolodi 14'; Rescia 26', 39'; Salas 32', 33'	Report	Avellino 19'; Lara 20'	Stadium: PalaRigopiano

=== Semifinals ===
==== 1st leg ====
May 15, 2015	Acqua e Sapone	3-3	Pescara	Montesilvano
20:00	Calderolli 34', 35', 40'	Report	Rogerio 19'; Salas 34'; Nicolodi 39' (pen.)	Stadium: Pala Roma

May 15, 2015	Kaos	2-1	Luparense	Ferrara
20:00	Kakà 5'; Bertoni 33'	Report	Waltinho 35'	Stadium: Palasport di Ferrara

==== 2nd leg ====
May 20, 2015	Pescara	7-3	Acqua e Sapone	Pescara
20:00	Rescia 1', 7', 13', 39'; PC 2', 39'; Morgado 15' (own); Canal 37'	Report	Cavinato 34'; De Oliveira 40'	Stadium: PalaRigopiano

May 20, 2015	Luparense	7-3	Kaos	San Martino di Lupari
20:00	Nora 7'; Taborda 15'; Mauricio 24', 40'; Merlim 30', 32'; Waltinho 40'	Report	Vinicius 16'; Bertoni 26' (pen.); André 32'	Stadium: PalaBruel

==== 3rd leg ====
May 22, 2015	Luparense	3-5	Kaos	San Martino di Lupari
20:45	Merlim 18' (pen.) 21', 39'	Report	Andrè 7'; Kakà 19', 31', 35', 37'	Stadium: PalaBruel

=== Final ===
==== 1st leg ====
May 28, 2015	Pescara	5-3	Kaos	Pescara
20:00	Nicolodi 7'; Ercolessi 22'; Rescia 24'; Rogerio 34'; PC 39'	Report	Kakà 7'; Tuli 27'; Bertoni 28'	Stadium: PalaRigopiano

==== 2nd leg ====
June 3, 2015	Kaos	3-4	Pescara	Ferrara
20:00	Coco 2'; Vinicius 4' (own); Bertoni 8'; Kakà 38'	Report	Canal 12'; Rogerio 18'; Rescia 24'	Stadium: Pala Hilton Pharma

==== 3rd leg ====
June 5, 2015	Kaos	2–2 (a.e.t) (4–3 p)	Pescara	Ferrara
18:30	Tuli 20'; André 37'	Report	P.C. 31'; Canal 32'	Stadium: Pala Hilton Pharma
	Penalties
	Bertoni (penalty missed); Pedotti (penalty scored); Coco (penalty scored); Tuli (penalty missed); Vinicius (penalty scored); Titon (penalty scored)		Nicolodi (penalty scored); Canal (penalty scored); Rogerio (penalty missed); Salas (penalty missed); Ercolessi (penalty scored); Morgado (penalty missed)

==== 4th leg ====
June 11, 2015	Pescara	1–1 (a.e.t) (3–2 p)	Kaos	Pescara
18:30	Pedotti 4'	Report	Salas 31'	Stadium: PalaRigopiano
	Penalties
	Nicolodi (penalty scored); Canal (penalty scored); Rogerio (penalty scored)		Pedotti (penalty scored); Coco (penalty missed); Bertoni (penalty scored)

2014–15 Serie A1 winners
(Abruzzo)
Pescara
First title

== See also ==
- Coppa Italia 2014-15 (futsal)
