= Acqua e Sapone Calcio a 5 =

Italian futsal club

Acqua e Sapone C5
- Full name: Società Sportiva Dilettantistica Acqua e Sapone Calcio a 5
- Founded: 2000
- Ground: PalaRoma, Montesilvano
- Capacity: 1,500
- Chairman: Davide Limone
- Manager: Massimiliano Bellarte
- League: Divisione Calcio a 5
- 2014-15: Serie A, 4th
- Website: http://www.acquaesaponec5.it
| Home colours | Away colours | Third colours |

Società Sportiva Dilettantistica Acqua e Sapone Calcio a 5 is a futsal club based in Città Sant'Angelo, Abruzzo, Italy.

== History ==
In 2000 Pescheto C/5 was founded, an amateur futsal sports association. It was the brainchild of six friends returning from a holiday in Brazil that gave life to a dream they had to bring a team to Città Sant'Angelo. In 2007 this team would merge with City Marina S. Angelo to create ASD Acqua e Sapone Marina CSA.

The team had quick successes from 2002 to 2005 with winning promotion from Serie D, Serie C2, and Serie C1. In 2005/06, their first season in Serie B, the team finished second in their group and missed being promoted through the playoff by not getting past the quarterfinals. In 2006/07 they finished in fourth place and missed out on the playoffs. After the merger in 2007 Acqua e Sapone finished first in their group and earned automatic promotion to Serie A2.

In the 2009/10 season the team excelled and won direct promotion to Serie A. Acqua e Sapone also made their first appearance in a cup final that season by participating in the Final Eight Serie A2 in which they lost in the final to Gruppo Fassina 2–1.

The team's first silverware from the top level came in 2013/14 when they won the Coppa Italia by beating Lazio 3–1 in the final. The next season they then defeated Luparense 6–1 to win the Supercoppa Italiana.

== Chronology ==
Chronology of Acqua e Sapone Calcio a 5
| 2000 · Foundation of Pescheto C/5.; 2000-01 · 7th in group ? of Serie D.; 2001-02 · 1th0 in group ? of Serie D.; 2002-03 · 7th in group ? of Serie D.; 2003-04 · 1st in group D of Serie D. Promotion to Serie C1.; 2004-05 · Disputes the championship of Serie C1. Promotion to Serie B.; Playoff Champion of Serie C1.: 2005 · Merger of Montesilvano C5 2000, assumes name Acqua e Sapone 2000.; 2005-06 · 2nd in group C of Serie B.; Quarter-finalist in playoffs of Serie B.: 2006-07 · 4th in group C of Serie B.; 2007 · Merger with Marina Castel Sant'Angelo, assumes name Acqua e Sapone Marina CSA.; 2007-08 · 1st in group C of Serie B. Promotion to Serie A2.; 2008-09 · 7th in group B of Serie A2.; 2009-10 · 1st in group B of Serie A2. Promotion to Serie A.; Finalist in Coppa Italia of Serie A2. | 2010-11 · 10th in Serie A.; 2011 Assumes the name Acqua e Sapone Calcio a 5.; 2011-12 · 7th in Serie A.; Quarter-finalist in play-offs. Quarter-finalist in the Coppa Italia.: 2012-13 · 6th in Serie A.; Semi-finalist in play-offs. Quarter-finalist in the Coppa Italia.: 2013-14 · 2nd in Serie A.; Finalist in play-offs. Semi-finalist in the Winter Cup. Winner of Coppa Italia (1st title).: 2014-15 · 4th in Serie A.; Winner of Supercoppa italiana (1st title). Semi-finalist in the Winter Cup. Quarter-finalist in the Coppa Italia. Semi-finalist in Playoffs: 2015-16 · 5th in Serie A; Quarter-finalist in the Coppa Italia |

== Current squad ==
Note: Flags indicate national team as defined under FIFA eligibility rules; some limited exceptions apply. Players may hold more than one non-FIFA nationality.

| No. | Pos. | Nation | Player |
|---|---|---|---|
| 1 | GK | ITA | Stefano Mammarella |
| 5 | MF | ITA | Francesco Patricelli |
| 7 | MF | ITA | Cristiano Fusari |
| 8 | DF | ITA | Murilo Ferreira (Captain) |
| 9 | MF | ITA | Fabricio Calderolli |
| 10 | MF | ITA | Wellington Coco |
| 11 | FW | ITA | Guilherme Gaio Gui |
| 12 | GK | ITA | Enrico Ricordi |
| 20 | MF | BRA | Misael Gonçalves |
| 21 | MF | SVN | Alen Fetić |
| 27 | MF | BRA | Rafael Rizzi |
| 30 | DF | BRA | Dudu |
| 89 | GK | ITA | Luca Cornacchia |
| 94 | MF | BRA | Rodrigo Trentin |
| 99 | FW | BRA | Lukaian Baptista |

== Famous players ==
- (Italy) Stefano Mammarella
- (Italy) Murilo Ferreira
- (Portugal) Fernando Leitão
- (Argentina) Leandro Cuzzolino

== Honours ==
- Coppa Italia: 2014
- Supercoppa Italiana: 2014

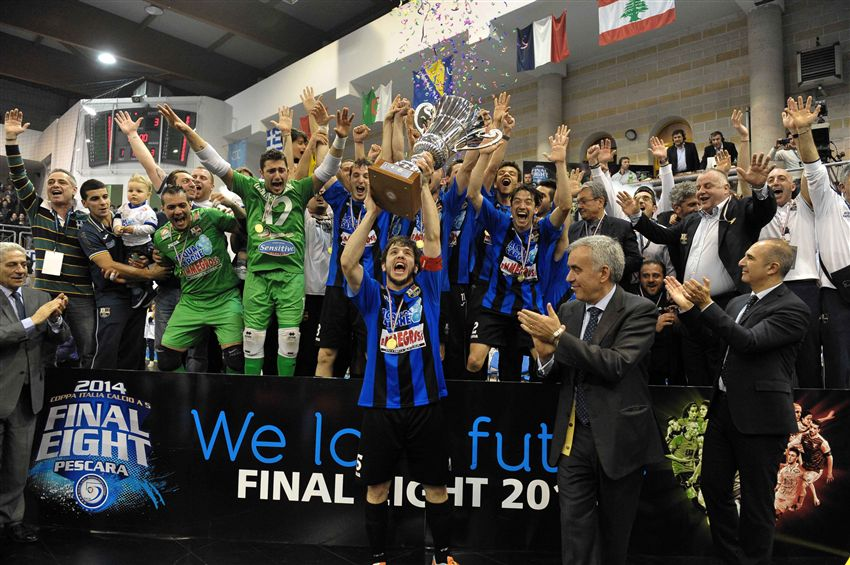
Acqua e Sapone Coppa Italia Winners 2014
