= 2016 Premier Futsal season squads =

The 2016 Premier Futsal season is the inaugural season of Premier Futsal. The season features six teams each playing four matches before culminating to the finals. The league started on 15 July 2016 and ended on 24 July 2016.

== Squads ==
The squad lists are below:

=== Bengaluru 5s ===
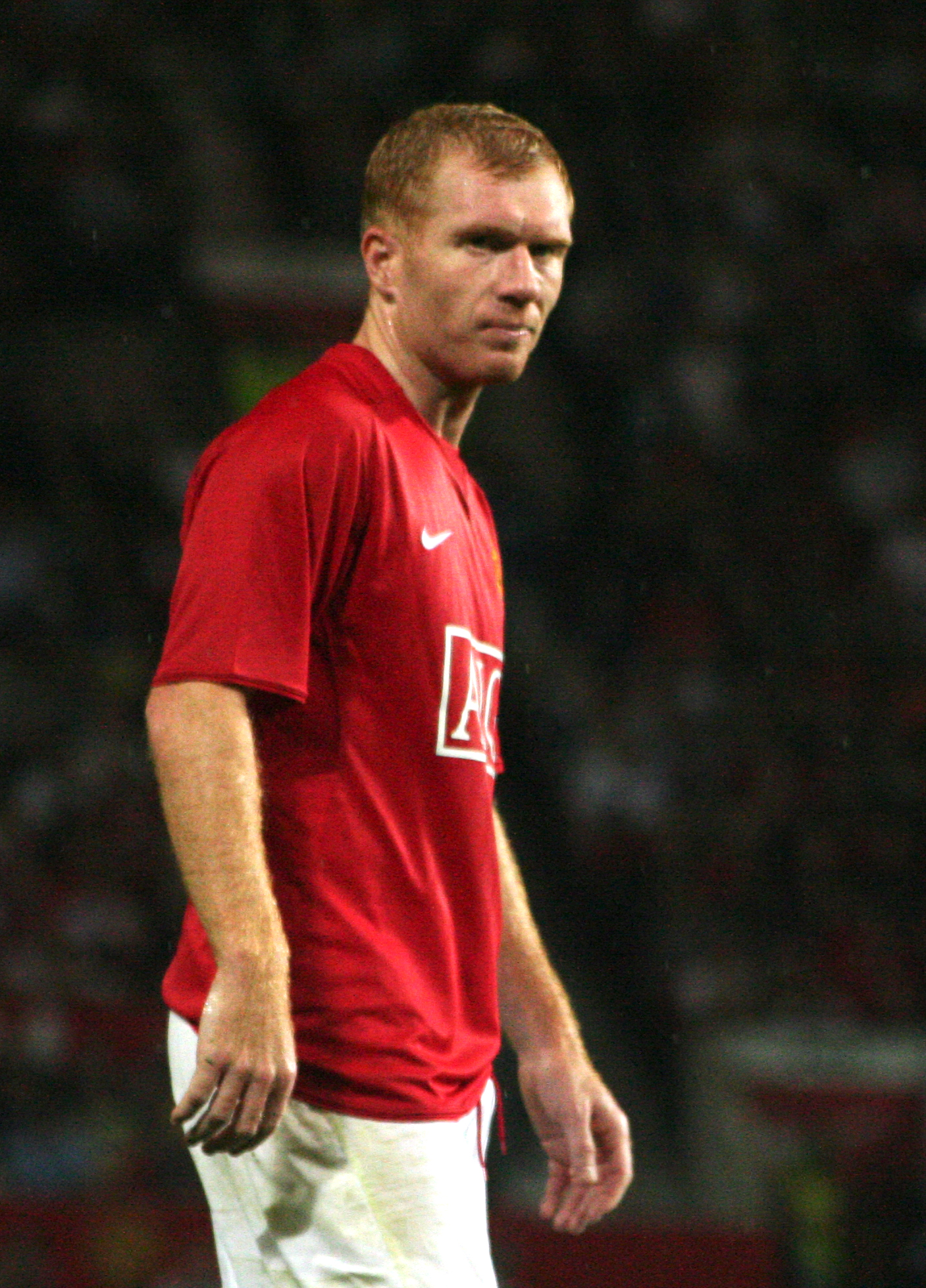
Paul Scholes, Bengaluru's Marquee player

- Paul Scholes (Marquee)
- Elias (GK)
- Neto
- Maximiliano
- Nabil
- Anatoliy
- Zaib
- Anto Rushith S
- Jonathan Piers
- Abhishek R (GK)
- Sathya Kumar
- Sai Nikhil

Head coach: Juan Jose Bernal Cierre

=== Chennai 5s ===
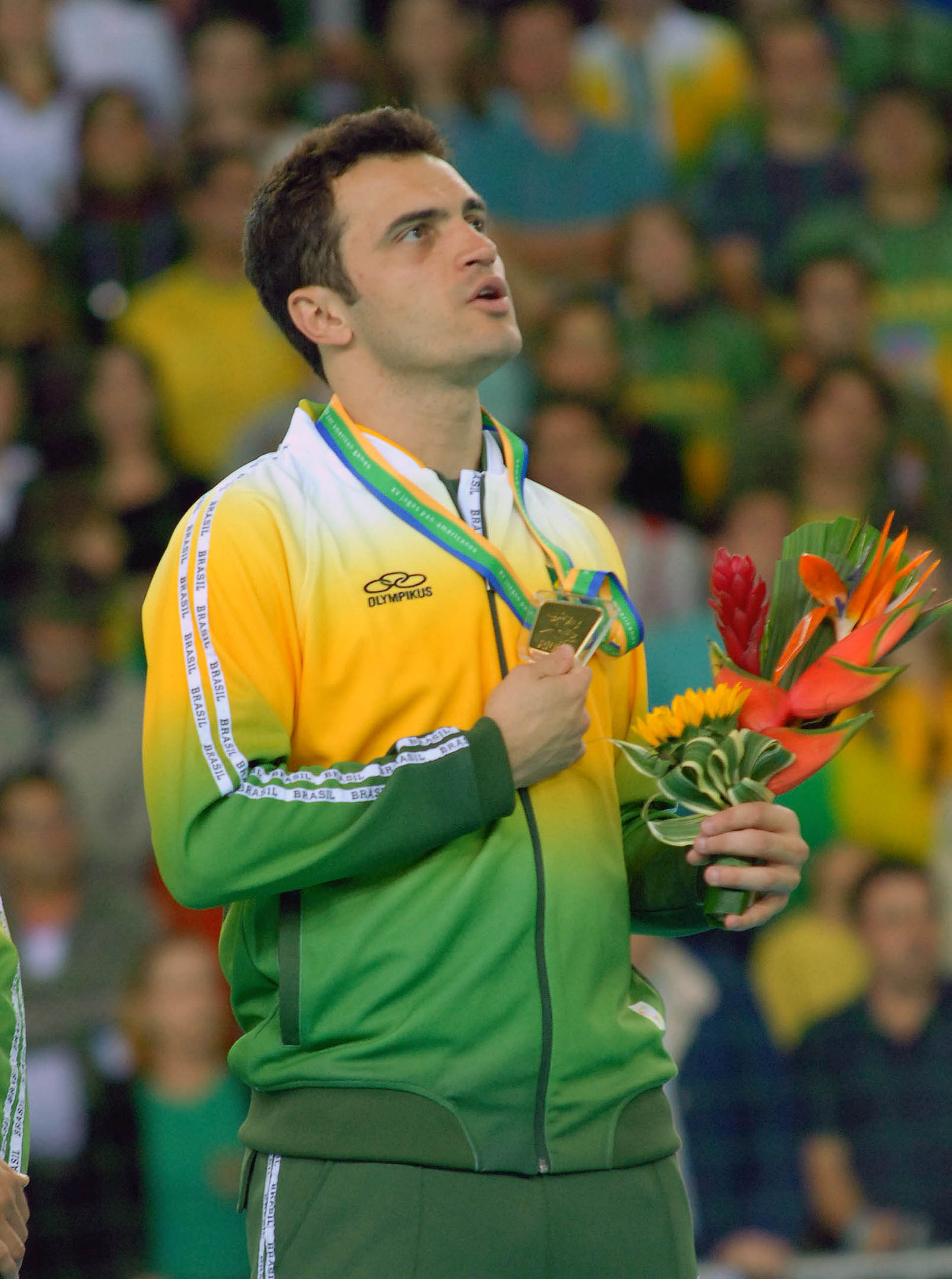
Falcão, Chennai's marquee player

- Falcão (Marquee)
- Espindola (GK)
- Romulo
- Cirilo
- Camilo
- Manel Rion
- Sean
- Faraz Abdul Azzez
- Yash
- Younus Pasha
- Rohit Suresh (GK)
- S. Nannda
- Haroon

Head coach: Ney Pereira

=== Goa 5s ===
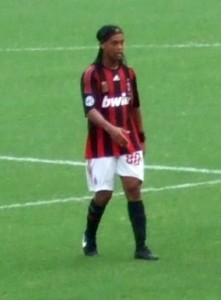
Ronaldinho, Goa's marquee player

- Ronaldinho (Marquee) (replaced by Cafu).
- Cafu (Marquee)
- Bebe (GK)
- Vampeta
- Rafael
- Georgievsky
- Adonias
- Michael Silva
- Fredsan Marshall
- Caitano
- Vatsal (GK)
- Praveendran
- Mohammed Ahtesham Ali

Head coach: Octavio Gomes De Oliveira Junior

=== Kochi 5s ===
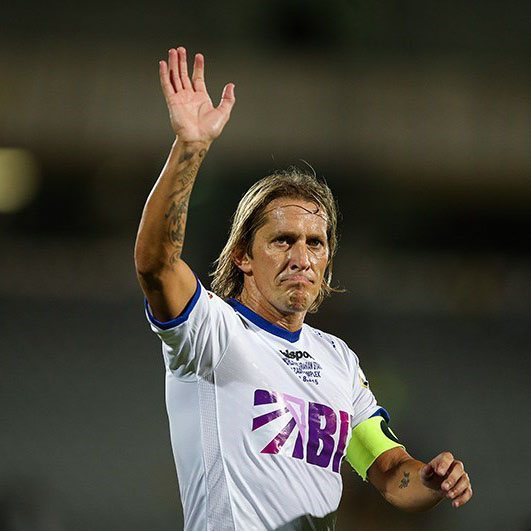
Míchel Salgado, Kochi's marquee player

- (Spain) Míchel Salgado (Marquee)
- Casalone (GK)
- Chaguinha
- Deives Moraes
- Gekabert
- Emil
- Muhammed Ameer
- Basil
- Yashwant Kumar (GK)
- Ansh
- Stalin Daniel
- Anupam

Head coach: Segio Sapo

=== Kolkata 5s ===
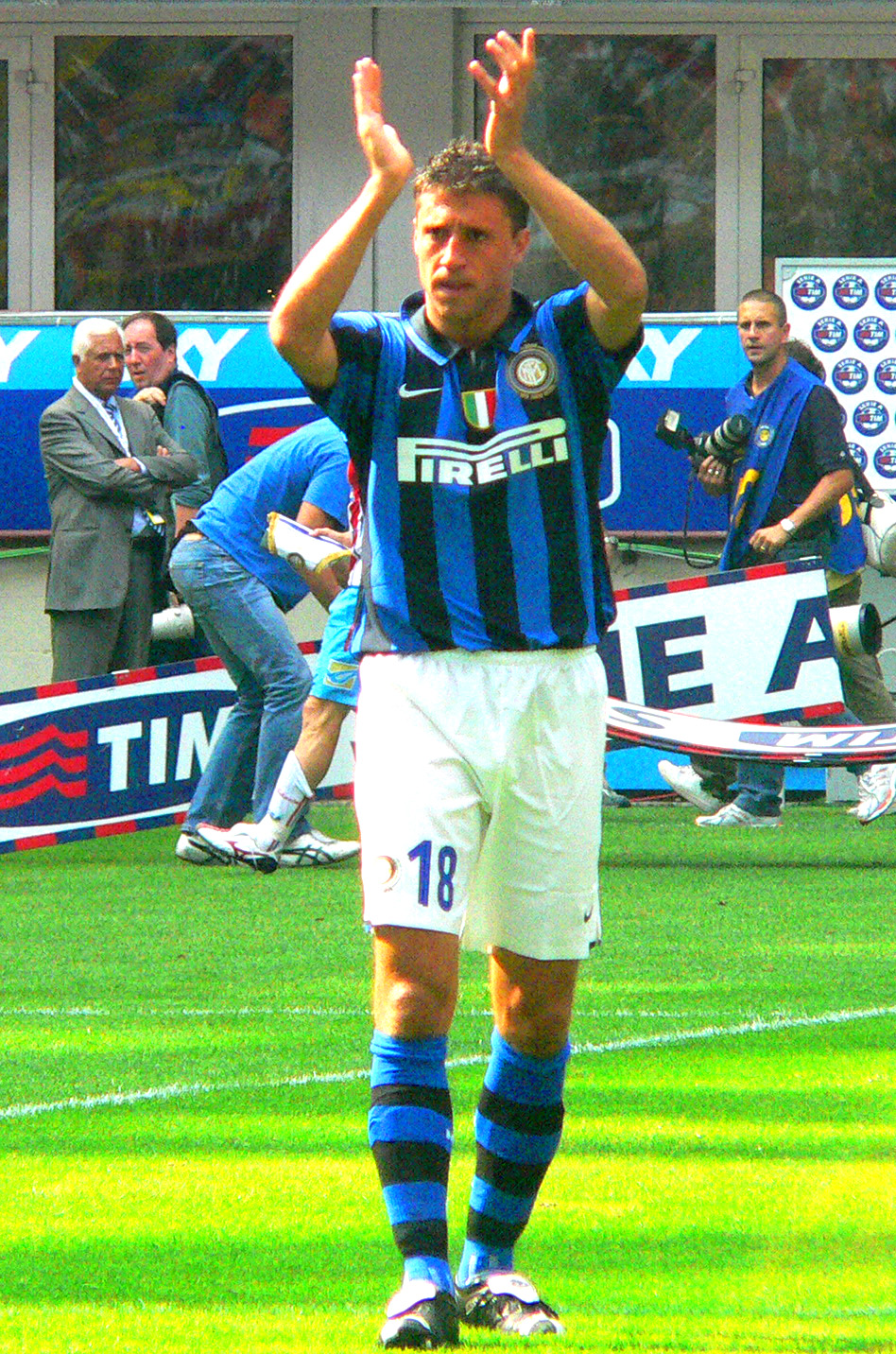
Hernán Crespo, Kolkata's marquee player

- Hernán Crespo (Marquee)
- Cidao (GK)
- Pula
- Gabriel
- Vander Carioca
- Majdoub
- Dida
- Mohammed Islam
- Amit Pal (GK)
- Subrata Dey
- Pradeep Shaw
- Akshay Nair
- Mayur Shellar

Head coach: Christian Roldan

=== Mumbai 5s ===
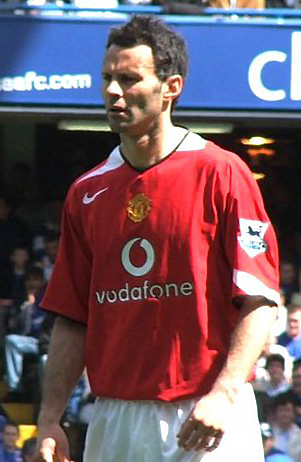
Ryan Giggs, Mumbai's marquee player

- Ryan Giggs (Marquee)
- Luis Amado (GK)
- Adriano Foglia
- Angelott Caro
- Kevin Ramirez
- Federico Perez
- Pablo
- Emmanuel
- Jo Paul Bence (GK)
- Akshay Nair
- Shubham Mane
- Chanpreet
- Shimyu

Head coach: Felice Mastropierro

== See also ==
- 2016 Premier Futsal season
- Premier Futsal
