= Massimo De Luca =

Italian futsal player

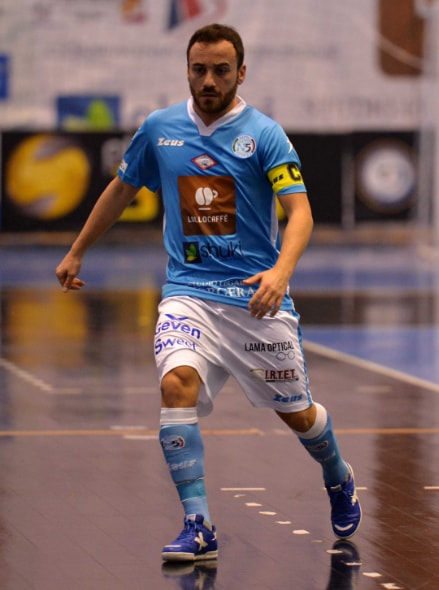

Personal information
- Date of birth: 7 October 1987 (age 39)
- Place of birth: Naples, Italy
- Height: 1.67 m (5 ft 6 in)
- Position: Winger

Team information
- Current team: Napoli

Senior career*
Years	Team	Apps	(Gls)
2006–2007	Napoli		
2008–2010	Napoli Barrese		
2010–2011	Luparense		
2011–2012	Marca		
2012–2013	Pescara		
2013	Martina		
2013–2014	Real Rieti		
2014–2016	Asti		
2016	Pescara		
2016–	Napoli		

International career
–	Italy		
- * Club domestic league appearances and goals

Massimo De Luca (born 7 October 1987) is an Italian futsal player who plays for Asti and the Italy national futsal team.
