= Alessio Musti =

Italian association futsal player and manager

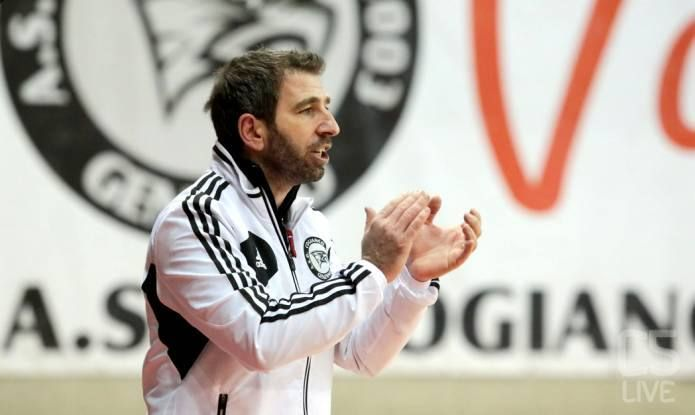

Personal information
- Date of birth: 12 May 1974 (age 52)
- Place of birth: Rome, Italy

Senior career*
Years	Team	Apps	(Gls)
1992–1996	Torrino		
1996-2003	Lazio		
2003-2004	BNL Roma		
2004-2005	Torrino		
2005-2006	Nepi		

International career
	Italy	11	(0)

Managerial career
- 2006–2007: Lazio
- 2007-2009: Torrino
- 2010: Alphaturris
- 2011-2013: Cogianco Genzano
- 2011-2014: Real Rieti
- 2014: Luparense
- 2015-2016: Cogianco Genzano
- 2017-2018: Italy assistant
- 2018-: Italy
- * Club domestic league appearances and goals

Alessio Musti (born 12 May 1974), is an Italian retired futsal player and coach of the Italian national futsal team.

== Honours ==
=== Player ===
==== Club ====
Torrino

- Serie A: 1992–93, 1993–94.
- Coppa Italia: 1992–93, 1993–94, 1994–95.

Lazio

- Serie A: 1997–98.
- Coppa Italia: 1997–98, 1998–99, 2002–03.

=== Manager ===
==== Club ====
Cogianco

- Serie A2: 2011–12
- Coppa Italia Serie A2: 2011–12
