= Adriano Foglia =

Brazilian-born Italian futsal player (born 1981)

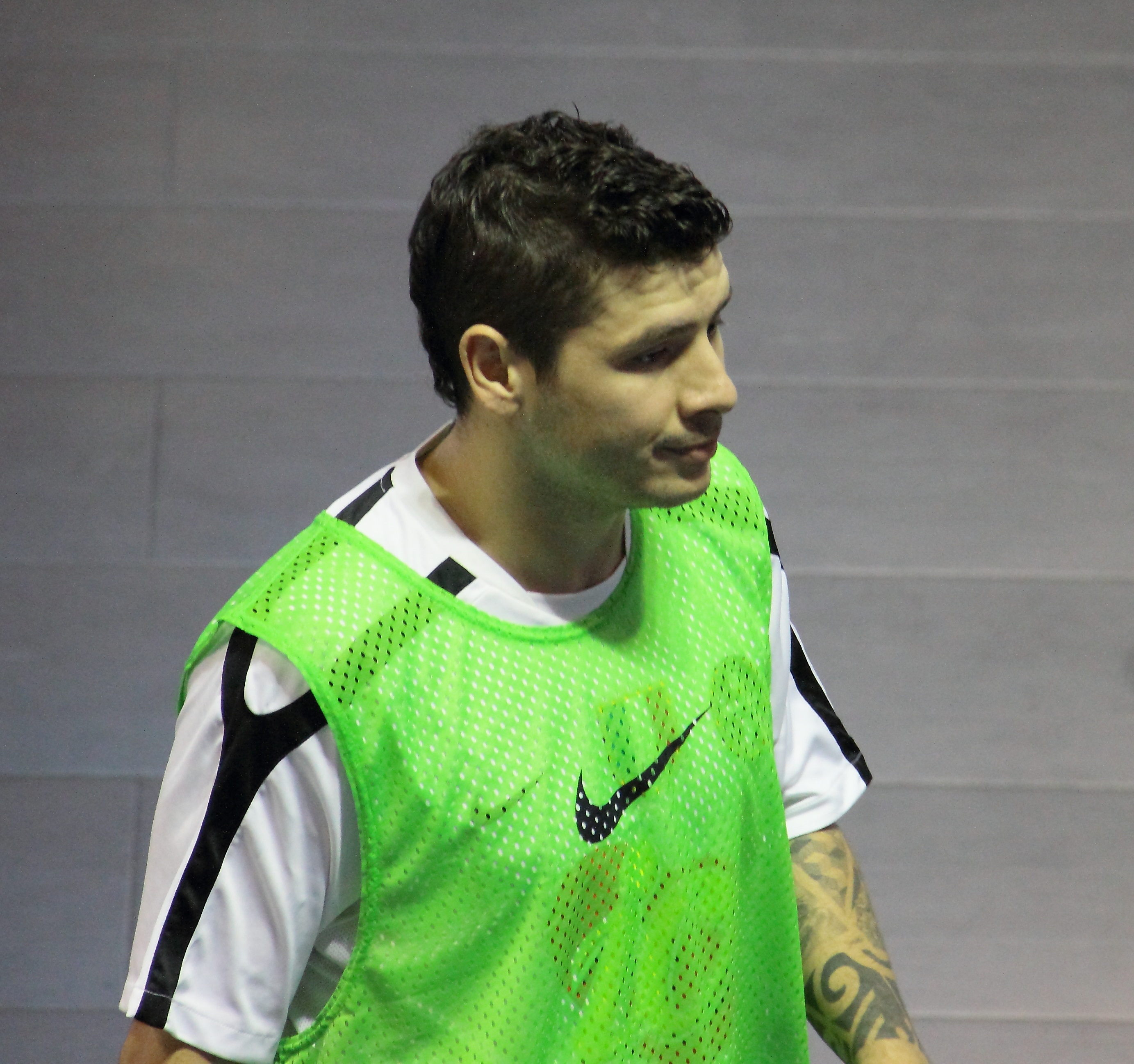

Personal information
- Full name: Adriano Foglia
- Date of birth: 25 April 1981 (age 45)
- Place of birth: São Paulo, Brazil
- Position: Flank

Team information
- Current team: Corinthians

Senior career*
Years	Team	Apps	(Gls)
- Palmeiras
2000–02	Augusta		
2002–03	Stabia		
2003–05	Arzignano Grifo		
2005–2008	Montesilvano		
2009	Malwee/Jaraguá		
2009–2011	Montesilvano		
2011–2012	Marca		
2012–2013	Lazio		
2013–2014	Araz Naxçivan		
2014–2015	Brasil Kirin		
2016	Luparense		
2016	Mumbai 5s	5	(6)
2016–	Corinthians		

International career
	Italy	101	(66)
- * Club domestic league appearances and goals

Adriano Foglia (born 25 April 1981), is a Brazilian-born Italian futsal player who plays for Corinthians as a Flank.

After beginning his career in Brazil, Foglia spent over a decade playing in Italy.

Foglia received the Futsalplanet.com Best Futsal Player of the World award for 2003.

== Honours ==
=== Individual ===
- Best Futsal Player of the World: 2003
