= 2008–09 Serie A (futsal) =

Serie A
- Season: 2008–09
- UEFA Futsal Cup: Luparense

The 2008–09 season of the Serie A is the 26th season of top-tier futsal in Italy, began October 25, 2008 and finished in June 2009.

== League table ==
| Pos | Team | Pld | W | D | L | GF | GA | GD | Pts | Qualification or relegation |
|---|---|---|---|---|---|---|---|---|---|---|
| 1 | Luparense | 26 | 16 | 7 | 3 | 106 | 45 | +61 | 55 | Playoff 2nd round |
| 2 | Montesilvano | 26 | 16 | 7 | 3 | 95 | 59 | +36 | 55 | Playoff 2nd round |
| 3 | Marca Trevigiana | 26 | 16 | 5 | 5 | 106 | 64 | +42 | 53 | Playoff 2nd round |
| 4 | Arzignano | 26 | 13 | 5 | 8 | 96 | 47 | +49 | 44 | Playoff 2nd round |
| 5 | Bisceglie | 26 | 11 | 8 | 7 | 83 | 65 | +18 | 41 | Playoff |
| 6 | Napoli | 26 | 11 | 7 | 8 | 89 | 64 | +25 | 40 | Playoff |
| 7 | Terni | 26 | 8 | 8 | 10 | 84 | 69 | +15 | 32 | Playoff |
| 8 | Cagliari | 26 | 8 | 7 | 11 | 94 | 74 | +20 | 31 | Playoff |
| 9 | Lazio | 26 | 8 | 8 | 10 | 86 | 85 | +1 | 31 (Note: 1 point deducted) | Playoff |
| 10 | Napoli Barrese | 26 | 8 | 6 | 12 | 92 | 87 | +5 | 30 | Playoff |
| 11 | Augusta | 26 | 8 | 6 | 12 | 75 | 83 | −8 | 30 | Playout |
| 12 | Pescara | 26 | 6 | 9 | 11 | 81 | 100 | −19 | 27 | Playout |
| 13 | Spoleto (R) | 26 | 3 | 9 | 14 | 54 | 72 | −18 | 18 | Relegation to Serie A2 |
| 14 | Scicli (R) | 26 | 2 | 4 | 20 | 39 | 266 | −227 | 9 | Relegation to Serie A2 |

(R) Relegated

== Playoff ==
First round
Cagliari | 5 | 2
Lazio | 0 | 5
Biscigle | 2 | 5
Atiesse | 2 | 1
Napoli | 3 | 7
Napoli V. | 6 | 2
Terni | 4 | 1
Napoli B. | 2 | 3

Quarter-finals
Luparense | 2 | 4
Cagliari | 0 | 1
Arz. Grifo | 5 | 8
Bisceglie | 4 | 2
Marca | 8 | 2 | 4
Napoli | 2 | 4 | 3
Montesilvano | 6 | 5
Terni | 2 | 0

Semi-finals
Luparense | 2 | 1 | 4
Arz. Grifo | 2 | 1 | 3
Marca | 2 | 3 | 8
Montesilvano | 4 | 1 | 9

Final
Luparense | 3 | 2
Montesilvano | 1 | 0

2008–09 Serie A
(Veneto)
Luparense
Third title

== Playout ==
Playout
Torrino | 2 | 4
Pescara | 5 | 5
Fassina | 2 | 1
Augusta | 4 | 4

== Top goalscorers ==
| Goals | Player | Club |
| 28 | Kaka | Augusta |
| 26 (2) | Schurtz | Napoli Barrese |
| 21 | Baptistella | Arzignano |
| 21 (1) | Ze Renato | Lazio |
| 20 | Jonas Pinto | Arzignano |
| 20 | Patias | Montesilvano |
| 18 | Bessa | Terni |
| 17 | Leite | Terni |
| 16 | Bellomo | Marca Trevigiana |
| 16 (2) | Previdelli | Cagliari |
