= European Futsal Cup Winners Cup =

Futsal Cup Winners Cup
- Founded: 2002
- Abolished: 2012
- Teams: 6
- Last champions: Gazprom-Ugra Yugorsk

The Recopa de Europa de Futsal (English: European Futsal Cup Winners Cup) was a futsal club competition contested annually by the most recent winners of all European domestic cup competitions. It was founded in 2002/03, is organised by LNFS. It's unofficial by the UEFA.

In 1990 there was Recopa de Europa de Futsal game organized by Mundo Deportivo. FC Barcelona beat AC Roma 3-1.

== Results ==
Season	Host city	Winner	Score	Runner-up	Third	Fourth
2011–12	Yugorsk	(Russia) Gazprom-Ugra Yugorsk	6–3 (in the round-robin)	(Belarus) MAPID Minsk	(Kazakhstan) Tulpar Karagandy	(Serbia) KMF Marbo Beograd
2008–09 — 2010–11	Not played					
2007–08	Niš	(Spain) Interviú	6–4	(Spain) Lobelle de Santiago	(Italy) Montesilvano	(Kazakhstan) Aktobe BTA
2006–07	Santiago	(Spain) Lobelle de Santiago	5–3	(Portugal) Benfica	(Italy) Luparense	(Russia) MFK Spartak Shelkovo
2005–06	Lugo	(Spain) Azkar Lugo	4–0	(Portugal) Boavista	(Italy) Nepi	(Croatia) MNK Split
2004–05	Not played					
2003–04	Murcia	(Spain) ElPozo Murcia	7–3	(Portugal) AR Freixieiro	(Belgium) Action 21 Charleroi	(Serbia) KMF Marbo Beograd
2002–03	Augusta	(Russia) Alfa Ekaterinburg	3–2	(Italy) A.S. Augusta	(Portugal) Fundação Jorge Antunes	(Croatia) Square Dubrovnik
1990–91 — 2001–02	Not played					
1989–90	Barcelona	(Spain) FC Barcelona	3–1	(Italy) AC Roma	-	-

In 2012 places were determined based on the results of the round-robin tournament.

== Performance by nation ==
Nation	Winners	Winning clubs
Spain	5	ElPozo Murcia (1), Azkar Lugo (1), Lobelle de Santiago (1), Inter Movistar (1), FC Barcelona (1)
Russia	2	Alfa Ekaterinburg (1), Gazprom-Ugra Yugorsk (1)
