= 2016 Premier Futsal season =

2016 Premier Futsal
Tournament details
- Host country: India
- Dates: 15 – 24 July 2016
- Teams: 6
- Venues: 2 (in 2 host cities)

Final positions
- Champions: Mumbai 5s (1st title)
- Runners-up: Kochi 5s
- Third place: Goa 5s
- Fourth place: Kolkata 5s

Tournament statistics
- Matches played: 15
- Goals scored: 79 (5.27 per match)
- Top scorer(s): Angellot Caro (8 goals)
- Best player: Chaguinha

The 2016 Premier Futsal was the inaugural tournament of Premier Futsal. The season featured six teams, each playing four matches before culminating in the finals. The league started on 15 July 2016 and ended on 24 July 2016.

Mumbai 5s won the inaugural season by defeating Kochi 5s 3-2 on penalties via sudden death.

== Teams ==
Locations of Premier Futsal teams

=== Stadiums and locations ===
Stadium	Location
Jawaharlal Nehru Indoor Stadium	Chennai, Tamil Nadu
Peddem Sports Complex	Mapusa, Goa

=== Marquee players ===
List of marquee players:

Teams	Marquee
Bengaluru 5s	(England) Paul Scholes
Chennai 5s	(Brazil) Falcão
Goa 5s	(Brazil) Ronaldinho (until 18 July 2016) (Brazil) Cafu (since 18 July 2016)
Kochi 5s	(Spain) Míchel Salgado
Kolkata 5s	(Argentina) Hernán Crespo
Mumbai 5s	(Wales) Ryan Giggs

- Ronaldinho was replaced by Cafu as the marquee player for Goa 5s.

== Rules ==
Note: The Premier Futsal tournament does not follow all of the rules of international Futsal.

=== Rules of 2016 Premier Futsal ===
- 4 quarters, 10 minutes each.
- No offsides.
- Throw-in instead of kick-in when ball goes out of play.
- Throw-in, penalty, keeper's release will have to be completed within 5 seconds.
- 5 players per team, unlimited rolling substitutes.
- Specially designed ball – Size 4.
- After 5, each foul lead to a penalty.

=== Penalty Shootout ===
- 5 penalties each.
- Penalty taker has 5 seconds to score.
- Unlimited touches of the ball.
- Deliberate foul by goalkeeper or preventing a goalscoring chance is a goal.
- Foul by attacker is a miss.

== Group stage ==
Tiebreaking criteria for group stage
The teams will be ranked according to points (3 points for a win, 1 point for a tie, 0 points for a loss). If tied on points, tiebreakers are applied in the following order:
1. Goal difference in all matches
2. Goal scored in all matches
3. Greater number of points obtained in the group matches between the teams concerned
4. Goal difference resulting from the group matches between the teams concerned
5. Greater number of goals scored in the group matches between the teams concerned
6. Drawing of lots

=== Group A ===
Pos	Team	Pld	W	D	L	GF	GA	GD	Pts	Qualification
1	Mumbai 5s (Q)	4	3	0	1	15	13	+2	9	Knockout stage
2	Kerala 5s (Q)	4	1	2	1	15	14	+1	5	Knockout stage
3	Chennai 5s	4	0	2	2	12	15	−3	2	

Source: Premier Futsal
(Q) Qualified for the phase indicated
15 July 2016
19:00

Chennai 5s	2–4	Mumbai 5s
Falcão 35', 36'	Report	Foglia 10' (pen.), 29'; Angellot 12'; Kevin Ramiez 34'

Jawaharlal Nehru Indoor Stadium, Chennai
16 July 2016
19:00

Mumbai 5s	1–4	Kerala 5s
Angellot 29'	Report	Deives Moraes 25' (pen.), 31'; Gekabert 32'; Salgado 38'

Jawaharlal Nehru Indoor Stadium, Chennai
17 July 2016
19:00

Kerala 5s	4–4	Chennai 5s
Deives Moraes 7', 33' (pen.); Chaguinha 17', 35'	Report	Falcão 10', 12'; Cirilo 18'; Camilo 27'

Jawaharlal Nehru Indoor Stadium, Chennai
19 July 2016
20:00

Mumbai 5s	4–3	Chennai 5s
Foglia 7', 34'; Angellot 17'; Ryan Giggs 26'	Report	Sean Garnier 9'; Romulo 15'; Camilo 23'

Peddem Sports Complex, Goa
20 July 2016
20:00

Kerala 5s	4–6	Mumbai 5s
Deives Moraes 3', 18'; Chaguinha 10', 36'	Report	Foglia 4', 20'; Kevin Ramirez 14'; Chanpreet 30'; Angellot 30'; Shimyu Manikkoth 40'

Peddem Sports Complex, Goa
21 July 2016
20:00

Chennai 5s	3–3	Kerala 5s
Camilo 12'; Nandha 18'; Falcão 39'	Report	Deives Moraes 37'; Chaguinha 38', 40'

Peddem Sports Complex, Goa

=== Group B ===
Pos	Team	Pld	W	D	L	GF	GA	GD	Pts	Qualification
1	Goa 5s (Q)	4	2	1	1	14	8	+6	7	Knockout stage
2	Kolkata 5s (Q)	4	1	3	0	8	6	+2	6	Knockout stage
3	Bengaluru 5s	4	0	2	2	4	12	−8	2	

Source: Premier Futsal
(Q) Qualified for the phase indicated
15 July 2016
20:00

Goa 5s	2–4	Kolkata 5s
Raphael 21'; Vampeta 29'	Report	Pula 5'; Mohammed Islam 6'; Crespo 24'; Mohammed Ahtesham Ali 34' (o.g.)

Jawaharlal Nehru Indoor Stadium, Chennai
16 July 2016
20:00

Kolkata 5s	1–1	Bengaluru 5s
Pula 17'	Report	Jonathan Piers 7'

Jawaharlal Nehru Indoor Stadium, Chennai
17 July 2016
20:00

Bengaluru 5s	2–7	Goa 5s
Maximiliano 10'; Jonathan Piers 15'	Report	Ronaldinho 6', 18', 19', 32', 40'; Fredsan Marshall 33'; Vampeta 39'

Jawaharlal Nehru Indoor Stadium, Chennai
19 July 2016
19:00

Kolkata 5s	2–2	Goa 5s
Pula 3'; Vander 9'	Report	Vampeta 24', 27'

Peddem Sports Complex, Goa
20 July 2016
19:00

Bengaluru 5s	1–1	Kolkata 5s
Jonathan Piers 6'	Report	Pula 17'

Peddem Sports Complex, Goa
21 July 2016
19:00

Goa 5s	3–0	Bengaluru 5s
Michael Silva 10'; Raphael 21'; Vampeta 40'	Report

Peddem Sports Complex, Goa

== Knockout stage ==
Semi-finals
23 July — Goa
Mumbai 5s	4
Kolkata 5s	2
23 July — Goa
Goa 5s	1
Kochi 5s	2

Final
24 July — Goa
Mumbai 5s	1 (3)
Kochi 5s	1 (2)

=== Semi-finals ===
23 July 2016
19:00

Mumbai 5s	4–2	Kolkata 5s
Angelott 9', 12', 32'; Kevin Ramirez 20'	Report	Carioca 22'; Gabriel 24'

Peddem Sports Complex, Goa

23 July 2016
20:00

Goa 5s	1–2	Kochi 5s
Vampeta 22'	Report	Chaguinha 13', 29'

Peddem Sports Complex, Goa

=== Final ===
24 July 2016
20:00

Mumbai 5s	1–1	Kochi 5s
Angellot 38'	Report	Deives Moraes 8'
Penalties
Foglia (penalty missed); Angellot (penalty scored); Kevin Ramirez (penalty missed); Perez (penalty scored); Giggs (penalty missed); Luis Amado (penalty scored)	3–2	(penalty scored) Chaguinha; (penalty missed) Paulinho; (penalty missed) Deives Moraes; (penalty scored) Gekabert; (penalty missed) Salgado; (penalty missed) Casalone

Peddem Sports Complex, Goa

=== Tournament team rankings ===
Premier League Futsal

Champion
Runner-up
Semi-finals
Group stage

Pos.	Team	G	Pld	W	D	L	Pts	GF	GA	GD
1	Mumbai 5s(C)	A	6	5	0	1	15	20	16	+4
2	Kochi 5s (RU)	A	6	2	2	2	8	18	16	+2
3	Goa 5s (SF)	B	5	2	1	2	7	15	10	+5
4	Kolkata 5s (SF)	B	5	1	3	1	6	10	10	0
5	Chennai 5s (GS)	A	4	0	2	2	2	12	15	−3
6	Bengaluru 5s (GS)	B	4	0	2	2	2	2	10	−8

== Season statistics ==
=== Most Goals ===
Player	Team	Goals
(Colombia) Angelott Caro	Mumbai 5s	8
(Brazil) Chaguinha	Kochi 5s	8
(Brazil) Deives Moraes	Kochi 5s	8
(Italy) Adriano Foglia	Mumbai 5s	6
(Italy) Vampeta	Goa 5s	6
(Brazil) Ronaldinho	Goa 5s	5
(Brazil) Falcão	Chennai 5s	5

=== Hat-tricks ===
Player	For	Against	Result	Date	Ref
(Brazil) Ronaldinho	Goa 5s	Bengaluru 5s	7–2	17 July 2016	
(Italy) Adriano Foglia	Mumbai 5s	Kochi 5s	6–4	20 July 2016	
(Colombia) Angelott Caro	Mumbai 5s	Kolkata 5s	4–2	23 July 2016	

== Awards ==
=== Player of the Match ===
Match	Player	Team	Ref.
Match 1	(Italy) Foglia	Mumbai 5s	
Match 2			
Match 3	(Brazil) Deives Moraes	Kochi 5s	
Match 4			
Match 5	(Brazil) Deives Moraes	Kochi 5s	
Match 6	(Brazil) Ronaldinho	Goa 5s	
Match 7	(Italy) Vampeta	Goa 5s	
Match 8	(Italy) Foglia	Mumbai 5s	
Match 9	(Russia) Pula	Kolkata 5s	
Match 10	(Italy) Foglia	Mumbai 5s	
Match 11	(Japan) Rafael	Goa 5s	
Match 12	(Russia) Romulo	Chennai 5s	
Semi-final 1	(Colombia) Angelott Caro	Mumbai 5s	
Semi-final 2	(Brazil) Chaguinha	Kochi 5s	
Final	(Colombia) Angelott Caro	Mumbai 5s	

=== End-of-season awards ===
Award	Player	Ref.
Player of the Tournament	(Brazil) Chaguinha	
Golden Arm Band	(Colombia) Angelott Caro	
Indian Player of the Tournament	(India) Jonathan Piers	

== Telecast ==
Sony Pictures Networks India Pvt. Ltd. acquired exclusive rights to broadcast Premier Futsal. As part of the agreement, all Premier Futsal matches will be televised live on Sony SIX, Sony ESPN and Sony Aath. Matches will also be available to live stream on Sony LIV.

== See also ==
- 2016 Premier Futsal season squads
- Premier Futsal
