= SS Lazio (disambiguation) =

SS Lazio is an Italian professional sports club based in Rome

SS Lazio may also refer to:

- SS Lazio Women 2015, Italian women's football team
- SS Lazio Calcio a 5, Italian five-a-side football club
- SS Lazio Calcio a 5 (women), Italian women 5-a-side football team
- SS Lazio Youth Sector, under-19 team and the academies of Italian professional football club S.S. Lazio
- SS Lazio Rugby 1927, Italian women's football team

== See also ==
- Lazio (disambiguation)
