= Marco Ercolessi =

Italian futsal player

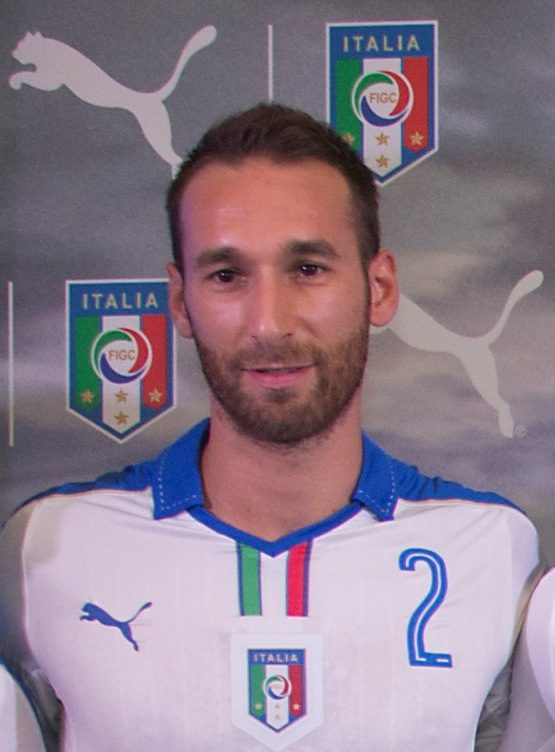
- Marco Ercolessi in 2015

Personal information
- Full name: Marco Ercolessi
- Date of birth: 15 May 1986 (age 40)
- Place of birth: Abano Terme, Italy
- Position: Ala

Team information
- Current team: Kaos Ferrara

Senior career*
Years	Team	Apps	(Gls)
2002	Cadoneghe		
2002–05	Petrarca Padova		
2005–06	Luparense		
2006–08	Belluno		
2008–12	Venezia		
2012–13	Marca		
2013–14	Luparense		
2014–16	Pescara		
2016–	Kaos Ferrara		

International career
2009–2020	Italy Futsal	137	(17)
- * Club domestic league appearances and goals

Marco Ercolessi (born 15 May 1986) is an Italian futsal player who plays for Kaos Ferrara and the Italian national futsal team.
