= 2017 in Indian sports =

The 2017 in Indian sports was held across the Indian cities all through the season.

== Events ==
=== International events ===
- 2–8 January – Chennai Open scheduled in Chennai.
- 24–29 January – Syed Modi International Grand Prix Gold scheduled in Lucknow.
- 16–19 February – India Open Squash is scheduled in New Delhi.
- 19–26 February – India participated in 2017 Asian Winter Games.
- 28 March – 2 April – India Super Series was held in New Delhi.
- 10–14 May – 2017 Asian Wrestling Championship held in New Delhi, India.
- 6–9 July – 2017 Asian Athletics Championship held in Bhubaneswar.
- 27 August – India beat Nepal by 2–1 in final of 2017 SAFF under −15 championship.
- 6–28 October – FIFA U-17 World Cup is scheduled. England wins the maiden title by beating Spain in final by 5–2.
- 22 October – India beat Malaysia by 2–1 in final of 2017 men's Hockey Asia Cup held in Dhaka, Bangladesh.
- 22 October – Srikant Kidambi wins 2017 Denmark Super Series Premier.
- 5 October – India won 2017 Hockey women's Asia cup held in Japan by beating China in final by 5–4 (1–1).
- 1 November – Indian cricket team registered their first T20I win against New Zealand at New Delhi
- 30 November – Mirabai Chanu wins gold in 2017 world weightlifting championship held in USA.
- 1–10 December – The 2016–17 Men's FIH Hockey World League Final took place in Bhubaneswar, India. India won bronze medal.

== Sports Leagues in 2017 ==
=== Domestic leagues ===
| League | Duration | Participation | Seasons | Winner/s |
|---|---|---|---|---|
| Premier Badminton League | 1 January – 14 January | 6 Clubs | Season 3 | Chennai Smashers |
| Pro Wrestling League | 2 January – 19 January | 6 Clubs | Season 2 | Punjab Royals |
| I League | 7 January – 29 April | 10 Clubs | Season 10 | Aizawl FC |
| Hockey India League | 21 January – 26 February | 6 Clubs | Season 5 | Kalinga Lancers |
| Super Fight League | 20 January – 25 February | 8 Clubs | Season 1 | Sher e Punjab |
| UBA Pro Basketball League | 16 February – 16 March | 8 Clubs | Season 4 | Mumbai Challengers |
| Indian Premier League | 5 April – 21 May | 8 Clubs | Season 10 | Mumbai Indians |
| Federation Cup | 7 May – 21 May | 8 Clubs | Season 38 | Bengaluru FC |
| Tamil Nadu Premier League | July 22 – August 20, 2017 | 8 Clubs | Season 2 | Chepauk Super Gillies |
| Karnataka Premier League | September 1–23, 2017 | 7 Clubs | Season 6 | Belagavi Panthers |
| Pro Kabaddi League | 28 July – 28 October | 12 Clubs | Season 5 | Patna Pirates |
| Duleep Trophy | 3 September- 29 September | 3 Clubs | Season 56 | India Red |
| Super Boxing League | 7 July – 12 August | 8 Clubs | Season 1 | Maratha Yodha |
| Premier Futsal League | 15 September – | 8 Clubs | Season 2 | Mumbai Warriors |
| Ranji Trophy | October 6, 2017 – January 2, 2018 | 28 Clubs | Season 84 | Vidharbha |
| Indian Super League | 17 November – 4 March | 10 clubs | Season 4 | Chennaiyin FC |
| Premier Badminton League | 23 December – 14 January | 8 Clubs | Season 4 | Hyderabad Hunters |

== Multi-sport events ==
| Event | Medals | | | Report |
| Event | Gold medal | Silver medal | Bronze medal | Report |
|---|---|---|---|---|
| 2017 Asian Winter Games | 0 | 0 | 0 | Report |
| 2017 World Games | 0 | 0 | 0 | Report |
| 2017 Summer Deaflympics | 1 | 1 | 3 | Report |
| 2017 Asian Indoor and Martial Arts Games | 9 | 12 | 19 | Report |
| Total | 10 | 13 | 22 | |
