= Kaká (futsal player) =

Italian futsal player (born 1987)

Personal information
- Full name: Carlos Augusto dos Santos da Silva
- Date of birth: 27 May 1987 (age 39)
- Place of birth: Serrana, Brazil
- Height: 1.80 m (5 ft 11 in)
- Position: Pivot

Team information
- Current team: Fuorigrotta
- Number: 14

Youth career
- Serrana Futsal
- São Paulo

Senior career*
Years	Team	Apps	(Gls)
2006–2007	São Paulo		
2015–2010	Augusta		
2010–2011	Verona		
2011–2012	Bisceglie		
2012–2018	Kaos Futsal		
2018–2019	Real Rieti		
2019–	Fuorigrotta		

International career^{‡}
2013–2016	Italy	17	(3)
- * Club domestic league appearances and goals as of 00:00, 30 August 2019 (UTC) ‡ National team caps and goals as of 00:00, 30 August 2019 (UTC)

Carlos Augusto dos Santos da Silva (born 27 May 1987), known as Kaká, is a Brazilian-born Italian futsal player who plays as a pivot for Fuorigrotta and the Italy national futsal team.

== Honours ==
=== Individual ===
- Serie A top scorer (3): 2008-09, 2012–13, 2015–16
