= Diego Giustozzi =

Argentinian association football player

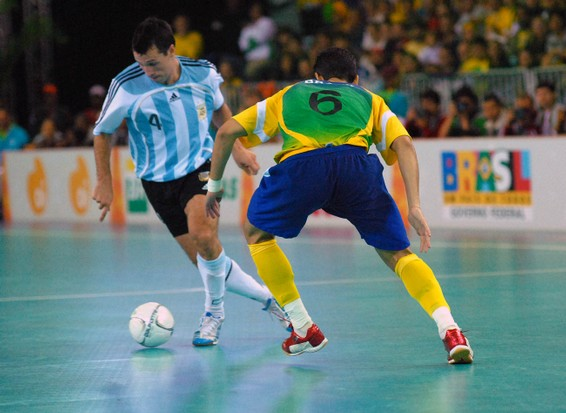
- Giustozzi (left) in 2007

Personal information
- Full name: Diego Raúl Giustozzi
- Date of birth: 1 August 1978 (age 48)
- Place of birth: Buenos Aires, Argentina

Team information
- Current team: Vietnam (manager)

Senior career*
Years	Team	Apps	(Gls)
1995–1997	Lugano (Argentina)		
1998	River		
1999	Firenze		
1999–2000	Montesilvano		
2000–2002	Roma		
2002–2004	Montesilvano		
2004–2005	Santiago Futsal		
2005–2009	Segovia Futsal		
2009–2010	Pescara		
2010–2012	Canottieri Lazio		
2012	Real Rieti		
2013	River		

International career
2000–2008	Argentina		

Managerial career
- 2013: Real Rieti
- 2014–2018: Argentina
- 2018–2022: ElPozo Murcia
- 2022–: Vietnam
- * Club domestic league appearances and goals

Diego Raúl Giustozzi (born 1 August 1978) is an Argentine futsal manager who manages Vietnam.

== Playing career ==
Giustozzi started his career with Argentine side Lugano (Argentina), helping them win their only league title. In 1999, he signed for Firenze in Italy. In 2003, Giustozzi helped Argentina win the 2003 Copa América de Futsal, their first major trophy. In 2005, he signed for Spanish top flight club Segovia Futsal.

In 2010, he signed for Canottieri Lazio in the Italian third tier, helping them achieve consecutive promotions to the Italian tip flight. In 2012, Giustozzi signed for Italian top flight team Real Rieti. In 2013, he returned to River in Argentina.

== Managerial career ==
In 2013, he was appointed manager of Italian outfit Real Rieti. In 2014, Giustozzi was appointed manager of Argentina, helping them win the 2016 FIFA Futsal World Cup, their only World Cup.

In 2018, he was appointed manager of ElPozo Murcia in Spain. In 2022, Giustozzi was appointed manager of Vietnam.

== Honours ==
Argentina

- Copa América de Futsal: 2015
- FIFA Futsal World Cup: 2016
