= Lazio (disambiguation) =

Lazio is a region of Italy in which Rome is located.

Lazio may also refer to:

- Eccellenza Lazio, the regional football league
- S.S. Lazio, a football club based in Rome
- Giro del Lazio, a bicycle race
- Rick Lazio, a U.S. Representative from the state of New York
- Anse Lazio, a beach on Praslin Island, Seychelles
- 20513 Lazio, an asteroid
- Viale Lazio massacre, a historical incident of Palermo, Sicily
- MV Lazio, an Italian cargo ship in service 1953-79
- MV Lazio (1993), in service since 1994

== See also ==
- Latium, the ancient name for Lazio
- SS Lazio (disambiguation)
