= Petrarca Calcio a Cinque =

Italian futsal club

Petrarca
- Full name: Petrarca Calcio a Cinque
- Nickname(s): --
- Founded: 1989
- Ground: Palazzetto Gozzano, Padua, Italy
Home colours	Away colours

Petrarca Calcio a Cinque is an Italian futsal club based in Padua, Italy.

== History ==
The club was founded in 1989. From 1997 to 2003 the Petrarca played in Serie A.

== Notable players ==
- (Italy) Marco Ercolessi

== Notable coaches ==
- (Spain) Jesús Velasco
