= Vampeta (futsal player) =

Brazilian-born Italian futsal player

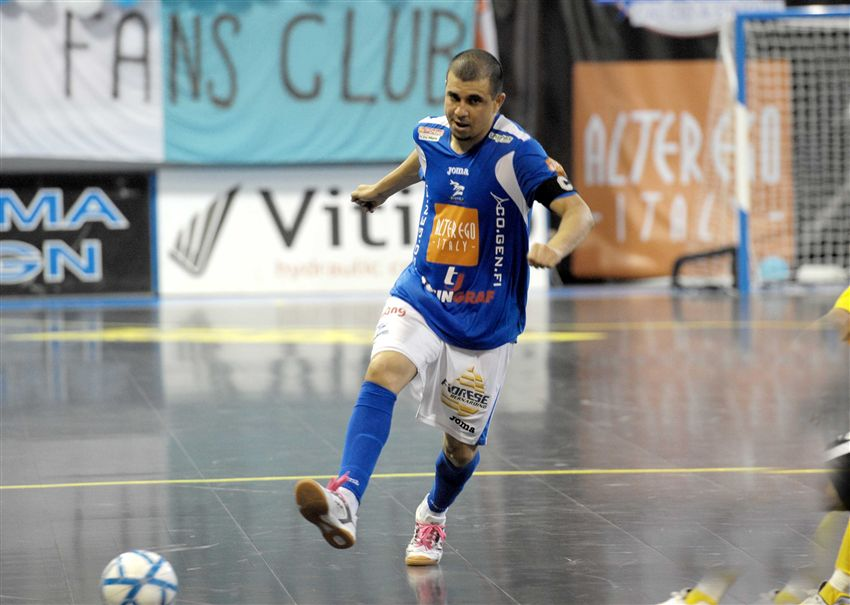

Personal information
- Full name: Jairo Manoel Dos Santos
- Date of birth: 18 July 1984 (age 42)
- Place of birth: Maringá, Brazil
- Position: Ala

Senior career*
Years	Team	Apps	(Gls)
2002–2004	Maringá		
2004–2012	Luparense		
2012–2014	Asti	47	(24)
2014	Kaos	9	(2)
2014–2019	Kazma SC		
2019	Mes Sungun	3	(1)
2020	Maringá		

International career
	Italy	59	(38)
- * Club domestic league appearances and goals

Jairo Manoel Dos Santos, a.k.a. Vampeta (born 18 July 1984), is a Brazilian born, Italian professional futsal player.
