= Murilo Ferreira =

Brazilian-born Italian futsal player

Murilo
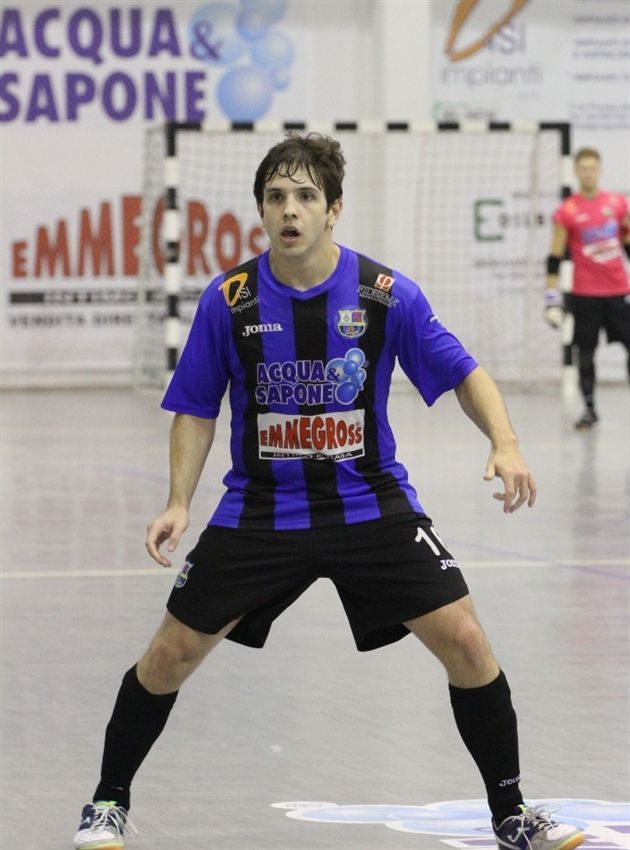

Personal information
- Full name: Julião Murilo Ferreira
- Date of birth: 10 March 1989 (age 37)
- Place of birth: São Paulo, Brazil
- Height: 1.78 m (5 ft 10 in)
- Position: Defender

Team information
- Current team: FortitudoPomezia 1957
- Number: 8

Senior career*
Years	Team	Apps	(Gls)
2007–	Acqua e Sapone		

International career
–	Italy		
- * Club domestic league appearances and goals

Julião Murilo Ferreira (born 10 March 1989), is a Brazilian born, Italian futsal player who plays for Fortitudo Pomezia 1957 and the Italian national futsal team.
