= Serie A (women's futsal) =

- Founded: 1992
- Country: Italy
- Confederation: UEFA
- Number of clubs: 2 groups of 12
- Level on pyramid: 1
- Domestic cup: Coppa Italia
- Current champions: Montesilvano (2010–11)
- Website: divisionecalcioa5
- Current: 2011-12 season

The Serie A is the women's premier futsal championship in Italy, is operated by the Divisione Calcio a 5. It was founded in 1994, which is played under UEFA rules and currently consists of two groups of 12 teams.

== Champions by year ==
Season	Winner	Runner-up
1992-1993	Roma 3Z	
1993-1994	not played	
1994-1995	Squash 88 Roma	
1995-1996	Torrino SC	
1996-1997	Il Brigante Napoli	AS Augusta
1997-1998	Dentecane Avellino	C.F. Colleferro
1998-1999	New Club Fioranello Roma	C.F. Colleferro
1999-2000	Lazio Calcio a 5	Brigante Napoli
2000-2001	Lazio Calcio a 5	Dinamo Faenza
2001-2002	Roma Lamaro	Calcetto Poggibonsese
2002-2003	Lazio Calcio a 5	Pro Reggina
2003-2004	Roma Lamaro	Cesena
2004-2005	Real Statte	Polaris Palermo
2005-2006	Real Statte	Montevelino
2006-2007	Città di Pescara	Virtus Roma Ciampino
2007-2008	Lazio Woman calcetto	Città di Pescara
2008-2009	Real Statte	Virtus Roma Ciampino
2009-2010	Isef Poggiomarino	Real Statte
2010-2011	Città di Montesilvano	Virtus Roma Ciampino

2011-12: Pro Reggina 2012-12: AZ Gold 2013-14: Lazio 2014-15: Ternana
