= SS Lazio Calcio a 5 (women) =

Italian football club

Lazio
- Full name: S.S. Lazio Calcio a 5
- Chairman: Luciano Chilelli
- League: Serie A
- 2017–18: Serie A regular season, 8th; Serie A play-offs quarter-finalist
- Website: http://www.sslaziocalcioa5.it
colours	colours

S.S. Lazio Calcio a 5 is an Italian women 5-a-side football team of a 5-a-side football club of the same name. The club is part of S.S. Lazio multi-sport club. The multi-sport club is related to S.S. Lazio, the professional football club, but did not related in terms of ownership.

== Structure ==
The women 5-a-side section had the first team, as well as youth teams known as Juniores, Allieve and Giovanissime.

== Honours ==
- Serie A
  - Winners: 5

 1998-99; 1999-2000; 2002-2003; 2007-2008; 2014-2014

• Italian Cup: 2
 2000-2001; 2013-2014

• Juniores league(Under 19): 6
 2014; 2015; 2016; 2017; 2018; 2019

== Namesakes ==
In 2018, A.S.D. Nova Phoenix was renamed to A.S.D. S.S. Lazio C5 Femminile.

There was yet another namesake women's 5-a-side-football club, Sabina Lazio Calcetto, Sabina Lazio Calcetto played in 2018–19 Serie C.

Both team were not officially affiliated to the multi-sport club.

== See also ==
- S.S. Lazio Women 2015
