= Mohammed Islam =

American professor

Mohammed Islam is an American professor of Engineering and Computer Science at University of Michigan and an Elected Fellow of the IEEE and Optical Society.
