= MV Lazio =

Two ships of Tirrenia di Navigazione have been named Lazio:

- MV Lazio (1953), in service 1953–67
- MV Lazio (1993), in service since 1994
