= Real Futsal Arzignano =

Italian futsal club

Arzignano C5
- Full name: Real Futsal Arzignano
- Founded: 1994; 2010
- Ground: PalaTezze di Arzignano; Arzignano, Italy
- Capacity: 1,500
- League: Serie A2 (futsal)
| Home colours | Away colours |

Real Futsal Arzignano is a futsal club based in Arzignano, Italy.

== Honours ==
- 2 Serie A:
  - 2003/04, 2005/06
- 1 Coppa Italia:
  - 2009
- 2 Supercoppa Italiana:
  - 2004 - 2006
- 1 Coppa Italia di Serie B:
  - 1998/99
- 1 Supercoppa Veneto:
  - 1999
- 1 Serie B:
  - 1998/99

== See also ==
- Serie A1 (Futsal)
- Divisione Calcio a 5
