= Città di Montesilvano Calcio a 5 =

Italian futsal club

Montesilvano
- Full name: Città di Montesilvano Calcio a 5
- Founded: 1984
- Dissolved: 2017
- Ground: Montesilvano, Italy
- Chairman: Antonio Iervolino
- League: Serie A2
Home colours	Away colours	Third colours

Città di Montesilvano Calcio a 5 is a futsal club based in Montesilvano, Italy. It is the only Italian club to win the UEFA Futsal Cup (2010–11)

== Chronology ==
Cronistoria del Città di Montesilvano C5
1984 · Foundation of Pescara C/5.; 1984–89· in Serie C.; 1989–90 · 1ª in Serie C. Promotion to Serie B, and renunciation for economic reasons.; 1990–91 · 1ª in Serie C. Promotion to Serie B.; 1991–92 · 1ª in Serie B. Promotion to Serie A.; 1992–93 · 13ª in Serie A.; 1993 · Merged with Virtus Serena C.S.A.. Assumes the name Polisportiva Virtus Pescara.; 1993–94 · 11ª in Serie A.; 1994–95 · 10ª in Serie A.; 1995–96 · 14ª in Serie A.; 1996–97 · 8ª in Serie A.; 3º in the play-offs.: 1997 · Merged with l'Angolana Sport. Assumes the name Polisportiva Angolana.; 1997–98 · 14ª in Serie A.; Won the play-out against Vesuvio Napoli.: 1998–99 · 12ª in Serie A.; 1999 · Returned to the team name Pescara C5.; 1999–00 · 7ª in Serie A.; Quarter-finalist in the play-offs. Round of 16 in the Coppa Italia.: 2000–01 · 13ª in Serie A.; Won the play-out against Arzignano Grifo. Round of 16 in the Coppa Italia.	2001–02 · 13ª in Serie A. Relegated to Serie B, but later was rescinded.; Lost in the play-out to CUS Chieti. Quarter-finalist in the Coppa Italia.: 2002–03 · 4ª in Serie A.; Semi-finalist in the play-offs. Round of 16 in the Coppa Italia: 2003 · Assumes the name Città di Montesilvano C5.; 2003–04 · 3ª in Serie A.; Quarter-finalist in the play-offs. Finalist in the Coppa Italia.: 2004–05 · 6ª in Serie A.; Quarter-finaliast in the play-offs. Quarter-finalist in the Coppa Italia.: 2005–06 · 8ª in Serie A.; Quarter-finalist in the play-offs.: 2006–07 · 3ª in Serie A.; Semi-finalist in the play-offs. Won the Coppa Italia (1º title).: 2007–08 · 2ª in Serie A; Quarter-finalist in the play-offs. Quarter-finalist in the Coppa Italia. Beaten finalist in the Supercoppa italiana. 3ª in European Futsal Cup Winners Cup.: 2008–09 · 2ª in Serie A.; Beaten-finalist in the play-offs. Semi-finalist in the Coppa Italia.	2009–10 · 2ª in Serie A. Champion of Italy (1º title).; Semi-finalist in the Coppa Italia.: 2010–11 · 4ª in Serie A.; Semi-finalist in the play-offs. Semi-finalist in the Coppa Italia. Beaten-finalist in the Supercoppa italiana. Won the UEFA Futsal Cup (1º title).: 2011–12 · 4ª in Serie A.; Semi-finalist in the play-offs. Semi-finalist in the Coppa Italia.: 2012–13 · 9ª in Serie A.; Semi-finalist in the Coppa Italia.: 2013 · Renounces Serie A status and relegated to Serie B.; 2013–14 · 1ª in group C di Serie B. Promossa in Serie A2.; Won the Coppa Italia di Serie B (1º title).: 2014–15 · Playing in group A in Serie A2.

== Honours ==
- 1 UEFA Futsal Cup (2010–11)
- 1 Coppa Italia
- 1 Serie A (2009–2010)

== UEFA Club Competitions record ==
=== UEFA Futsal Cup ===
Season	Competition	Round	Country	Opponent	Result	Venue
2010/11	UEFA Futsal Cup	Main Round	(Finland)	Ilves	6–1	Montesilvano
2010/11	UEFA Futsal Cup	Main Round	(Israel)	ASA Tel Aviv	6–1	Montesilvano
2010/11	UEFA Futsal Cup	Main Round	(Croatia)	Nacional Zagreb	2–1	Montesilvano
2010/11	UEFA Futsal Cup	Elite Round	(Russia)	Viz-Sinara	2–1	Yekaterinburg
2010/11	UEFA Futsal Cup	Elite Round	(Azerbaijan)	Araz Naxçivan	2–2	Yekaterinburg
2010/11	UEFA Futsal Cup	Elite Round	(Cyprus)	AGBU Ararat	10–0	Yekaterinburg
2010/11	UEFA Futsal Cup	Final Four	(Portugal)	Benfica	3–0	Almaty
2010/11	UEFA Futsal Cup	Final Four	(Portugal)	Sporting CP	5–2	Almaty
2011/12	UEFA Futsal Cup	Elite Round	(Ukraine)	Uragan Ivano-Frankovsk	1–1	Padua
2011/12	UEFA Futsal Cup	Elite Round	(Slovakia)	Slov-Mativ	2–1	Padua
2011/12	UEFA Futsal Cup	Elite Round	(Italy)	Marca Futsal	2–2	Padua
