= Augusta 1986 =

Italian futsal club

Augusta
- Full name: ASD Augusta 1986
- Founded: 1986
- Ground: Palajonio; Augusta, Italy
- Capacity: 2,000
- Chairman: G. Santanello
- League: Serie A2
Home colours	Away colours

Associazione Sportiva Dilettantistica Augusta 1986 is a futsal club based in Augusta, Italy.

== Honours ==
- Coppa Italia (Futsal):
  - Winner (2001)
  - Runner-up (2000), (2008)
- European Futsal Cup Winners Cup:
  - Runner-up (2003)

== See also ==
- Serie A (futsal)
- Divisione Calcio a 5
