= LCF Martina =

Italian futsal club

LC Five
- Full name: LC Five Martina
- Founded: 2009
- Ground: PalaWojtyla, Martina Franca
- Capacity: 1,200
- Chairman: Cosimo Scatigna
- Manager: Basile Piertro
- League: Serie A
Home colours

LC Five Martina is a futsal club based in Martina Franca, Apulia, Italy.

== Current squad ==
Note: Flags indicate national team as defined under FIFA eligibility rules; some limited exceptions apply. Players may hold more than one non-FIFA nationality.

No.	Pos.	Nation	Player
—		(Brazil) BRA	Sant'ana
—		(Italy) ITA	Lisi
—		(Argentina) ARG	Arellano
—		(Italy) ITA	Scatigna
—		(Italy) ITA	Marinosci
—		(Italy) ITA	Solidoro
—		(Brazil) BRA	Manfroi
—		(Brazil) BRA	Luft

No.	Pos.	Nation	Player
—		(Italy) ITA	Lopopolo
—		(Brazil) BRA	Dao
—		(Brazil) BRA	Bocão
—		(Brazil) BRA	Fininho
—		(Brazil) BRA	Pagnussat
—		(Brazil) BRA	Paulinho
—		(Italy) ITA	Micoli
—		(Spain) ESP	Saúl
