= 2017 Premier Futsal =

2nd season of Futsal tournament

Tournament details
- Host country: India; United Arab Emirates
- Dates: September 15 – October 1
- Teams: 6
- Venues: 4 (Delhi, Bangalore, Mumbai, Dubai)

The 2017 Premier Futsal was the second edition of Premier Futsal, which debuted in July 2016. Semi-finals were played in bilateral format where Mumbai Warriors beat Telugu Tigers and Delhi Dragons beat Bengaluru Royals. Mumbai Warriors won against Delhi Dragons 3–2 and won its second consecutive title.

== Teams ==
Team	Location	Marquee
Mumbai Warriors	Mumbai	(Wales) Ryan Giggs
Kerala Cobras	Kochi	(Spain) Míchel Salgado
Chennai Singhams	Chennai	(Argentina) Hernán Crespo
Telugu Tigers	Hyderabad	(Portugal) Deco
Delhi Dragons	New Delhi	(Brazil) Ronaldinho
Bengaluru Royals	Bengaluru	(England) Paul Scholes
