= Luparense FC (football) =

Luparense
- Full name: Luparense Football Club
- Nicknames: I Rossoblù San Martinari (San Martino's Red & Blue); I Lupi (The Wolves)
- Founded: 1933; 1952 (refounded)
- Ground: Stadio Communale G. Casèe
- Capacity: 1,500 (600 seated)
- League: Serie D
| Home colours | Away colours |

Luparense Football Club is an Italian association football in San Martino di Lupari in the Province of Padua. It is the same club that operates the futsal section of the same name.

== History ==
The club was founded in 1933 and refounded in 1952.

It have played as Unione Sportiva Luparense in Serie C and Serie D; currently it plays at the step 7 of the Italian football league system, in the Prima Categoria Veneto Girone F.

=== The merger ===
22 June 2015 A.S.D. Radio Birikina (the club have changed its name for sponsorship reasons) merged with A.S.D. Luparense Football Club, the local club of futsal changing its name in the current.

It plays with the team B after the moving of "S.S.D. Atletico San Paolo Padova", now Luparense San Paolo F.C. in the same city.

== Colors and badge ==
The team's colors are red and blue.
