= ASD Asti Calcio a 5 =

Italian futsal club

Asti Calcio a 5
- Full name: A.S.D. Asti calcio a 5
- Nickname: Orange
- Founded: 2005
- Ground: Pala San Quirico, Asti, Italy
- Capacity: 1600
- Chairman: Claudio Giovannone
- Manager: Cafu
- League: Serie A
- 2013-14: 1st, Semi-finalist
Home colours	Away colours	Third colours

Associazione Sportiva Dilettantistica Asti Calcio a 5 is a futsal club based in Asti, Piedmont, Italy.

== History ==
Chronology of'Asti Calcio a 5
2005 · Foundation of'Asti C5.; 2005-06 · 1ª in Serie D. Promotion to Serie C2.; 2006-07 · 1ª in Serie C2. Promotion to Serie C1.; 2007-08 · 1ª in Serie C1. Promotion to Serie B.; 2008-09 · 1ª in group A of Serie B. Promotion to Serie A2.; 1ª fase of Coppa Italia of Serie B.: 2009-10 · 1ª in group A of Serie A2. Promotion to Serie A.; 2010-11 · 7ª in Serie A.; Quarter-finalist in play-off. Quarter-finalist in Coppa Italia.: 2011-12 · 6ª in Serie A.; Quarter-finalist in play-off. Winner of Coppa Italia (1º title).	2012-13 · 1ª in Serie A.; Semi-finalist play-off. Beaten finalist in Supercoppa italiana. Quarter-finalist in Coppa Italia.: 2013-14 · 1ª in Serie A.; Semifinalista play-off. Winner of Winter Cup (1º title). Quarter-finalist in Coppa Italia.: 2014-15 · 3rd in Serie A; Quarter-finalist in playoffs. Winner of Winter Cup (2º title). Winner of Coppa Italia (2º title).: 2015-16 • Playing for Scudetto in Serie A.

== Honors ==
- Coppa Italia: 2012, 2015
- Winter Cup: 2014, 2015

== Famous players ==
- (Italy) Gabriel Lima
- (Italy) Alessandro Patias
