= Premier Futsal League =

Futsal tournament

Premier Futsal
- Organising body: Futsal Association of India
- Founded: 5 April 2016
- First season: 2016
- Folded: 2017
- Country: India (originally)
- Last champions: Mumbai Warriors (2nd title)
- Broadcaster(s): Sony SIX; Sony ESPN; Sony Aath
- Website: premierfutsal.com

The Premier Futsal was an Indian franchise-based futsal league conceptualised by Indian entrepreneurs under the entity of Pvt. Ltd. It was founded by Abhinandan Balasubramanian, Dinesh Raj and Nithyashree Subban, backed by business magnate Xavier Britto and his wife, philanthropist Vimala Rani Britto.

== Format ==
Each playing team consists of three international futsal players, one international marquee football player and one Indian futsal player. Every squad is allowed a maximum of twelve players.

Premier Futsal conducted a talent hunt programme across eight cities called Launchpad to scout and select Indian players. The programme combed through 2500 participants per city to shortlist five regional players for each team. Mumbai 5s won the inaugural Premier Futsal by defeating Kochi 5s in the penalty shootout.

== Management team ==
- Xavier Britto - Chairman & investor & Indev Logistics
- Dinesh Raj - Managing director of Premier Futsal
- Abhinandan Balasubramanian - CEO of Premier Futsal
- Nithyashree Subban - Director of finance & strategy
- Vimala Rani Britto - Director of Premier Futsal

== Brand ambassadors ==
Indian cricket team batsman Virat Kohli has joined the Premier Futsal as its brand ambassador.

Premier Futsal attracted a lot of fans when they signed one of the best futsal players in the world, Alessandro Rosa Vieira, popularly known as Falcão.

On 12 May 2016, Virat Kohli along with Falcão facilitated the launch of the nationwide talent hunt to select 40 players who will represent their respective cities in the first season of Premier Futsal.

== Anthem ==
The Premier Futsal anthem Naam Hai Futsal had its tunes set by two-time Academy Award winner A. R. Rahman with vocals also provided by Karthik, Lady Kash and Virat Kohli.

== Previous teams ==
Team	City	Owner	Marquee	Head coach
Kolkata 5s	Kolkata, West Bengal	Grassroot Entertainment Pvt. Ltd	(Argentina) Hernán Crespo	Christian Roldan
Chennai Singhams	Chennai, Tamil Nadu	The Hindu	(Brazil) Falcão	Falcão
Bengaluru Royals	Bengaluru, Karnataka	Puneeth Rajkumar	(England) Paul Scholes	Juan Jose Bernal Cirre
Telugu Tigers	Hyderabad, Telangana	Rana Daggubati, Esa Mohammed and Jonaid Bin Tajuddin Al Mohammed	(Portugal) Deco	
Kerala Cobras	Kochi, Kerala	ES Entertainment	(Spain) Míchel Salgado	Sergio Sapo
Mumbai Warriors	Mumbai, Maharashtra	DC Design	(Wales) Ryan Giggs	Ney Pereira
Delhi Dragons	New Delhi, Delhi		(Brazil) Ronaldinho	
Goa 5s	Goa		(Brazil) Cafu	

== Results ==
=== By season ===
Season	Final Match	Winner	Score	Runners–up	Venue	Player of the tournament	Semi-finalists
2016	24 July	Mumbai 5s	1–1 (3-2 p)	Kerala 5s	Peddem Sports Complex, Mapusa, Goa	(Brazil) Chaguinha	Kolkata 5s Goa 5s
2017	1 October	Mumbai Warriors	3–2	Delhi Dragons	Al Wasl Indoor Stadium, Dubai	(Brazil) Ronaldinho	Telugu Tigers; Bengaluru Royals

== Telecast ==
Sony Pictures Networks India Pvt. Ltd. acquired exclusive rights to broadcast Premier Futsal. As part of the agreement, all Premier Futsal matches will be televised live on Sony SIX, Sony ESPN and Sony Aath. Matches will also be available to live stream on Sony LIV.

In Indonesia, all Premier Futsal matches also broadcast live on nonton.com (2016 only) and Super Soccer TV (from 2017).

== See also ==
- History of Indian football
- AFC Futsal Asian Cup
- FIFA Futsal World Cup
- AIFF Futsal Club Championship
- Minifootball
- Five-a-side football
- Indoor soccer
