= Serie A1 (futsal) =

- Founded: 1983
- Country: Italy
- Confederation: UEFA
- Number of clubs: 16
- Level on pyramid: 1
- Relegation to: Serie A2
- Domestic cup: Coppa Italia
- International cup: UEFA Futsal Cup
- Current champions: L84
- Most championships: Luparense (6 titles)
- Broadcaster(s): RAI
- Website: http://www.Divisionecalcioa5.it
- Current: 2025–26

Serie A1 is the premier futsal league in Italy. It was founded in 1984. The league, which is played under UEFA rules, currently consists of 16 teams. It is organized by Divisione Calcio a 5.

== Champions ==
Season	Champion	Top goalscorer	Goals
1984	Roma Barilla		
1984–85	Roma Barilla		
1985–86	Ortana Griphus		
1986–87	Marino Calcetto		
1987–88	Roma RCB		
1988–89	Roma RCB		
1989–90	Roma RCB		
1990–91	Roma RCB		
1991–92	BNL Roma	(Italy) Mario Patriarca (Bologna Futsal)	
1992–93	Torrino	(Italy) Mario Patriarca (Bologna Futsal)	
1993–94	Torrino	(Italy) Andrea Rubei (Torrino)	
1994–95	BNL Roma		
1995–96	BNL Roma	(Italy) Giovanni Roma (BNL Roma)	48
1996–97	BNL Roma	(Italy) Roberto Matranga (Virtus Ladispoli)	52
1997–98	Lazio	(Italy) Mario Paolillo (Afragola Calcio)	45
1998–99	Torino	(Italy) Andrea Bearzi (Prato)	53
1999–00	Genzano	(Brazil) Ivan Júnior (Augusta)	54
2000–01	Roma RCB	(Italy) Adriano Foglia (Augusta)	44
2001–02	Prato	(Italy) Adriano Foglia (Augusta)	45
2002–03	Prato	(Italy) Fabrizio Amoroso (Arzignano)	35
2003–04	Arzignano	(Italy) Eduardo Morgado (Montesilvano)	40
2004–05	Perugia	(Brazil) Arrepio (Genzano)	33
2005–06	Arzignano	(Italy) Fabrizio Amoroso (Arzignano)	34
2006–07	Luparense	(Brazil) Sandrinho (Luparense)	34
2007–08	Luparense	(Brazil) Ivan Júnior (Montesilvano)	35
2008–09	Luparense	(Italy) Kaká (Augusta)	28
2009–10	Montesilvano	(Brazil) Gustavo Menini (Pescara)	36
2010–11	Marca	(Italy) Rodolfo Fortino (Augusta)	30
2011–12	Luparense	(Italy) Adriano Foglia (Marca) (Spain) Héctor Albadalejo (Acqua e Sapone)	28
2012–13	Marca	(Italy) Kaká (Kaos Futsal)	33
2013–14	Luparense	(Brazil) Paulinho (Five Martina)	29
2014–15	Pescara	(Italy) Manoel Crema (Real Rieti)	23
2015–16	Asti	(Italy) Kaká (Kaos Futsal) (Brazil) Márcio Zanchetta (Real Rieti)	28
2016–17	Luparense	(Brazil) Marcelinho (Isola)	24
2017–18	Acqua&Sapone	(Brazil) Jader Fornari (Feldi Eboli)	27
2018–19	Italservice	(Argentina) Cristian Borruto (Italservice)	28
2019–20	Cancelled due to COVID-19 pandemic		
2020–21	Italservice	(Italy) Arlan Vieira (Came Dosson)	38
2021–22	Italservice	(Italy) Alessandro Patias (Real San Giuseppe) (Italy) Rodolfo Fortino (FF Napoli)	35
2022–23	Feldi Eboli	(Italy) Marcelinho (Roma 1927)	32
2023–24	Meta Catania	(Italy) Rodolfo Fortino (Roma 1927)	31
2024–25	Meta Catania	(Italy) Rodolfo Fortino (Roma 1927)	31
2025–26	L84	(Argentina) Gonzalo Pires (Capurso)	29

=== Performance by club ===
Titles	Club	Winning years
6	Luparense	2007, 2008, 2009, 2012, 2014, 2017
5	Roma RCB	1988, 1989, 1990, 1991, 2001
4	BNL Roma	1992, 1995, 1996, 1997
3	Italservice	2019, 2021, 2022
2	Roma Barilla	1984, 1985
2	Torrino	1993, 1994
2	Prato	2002, 2003
2	Arzignano Grifo	2004, 2006
2	Marca	2011, 2013
2	Meta Catania	2024, 2025
1	Ortana Griphus	1986
1	Marino Calcetto	1987
1	Lazio	1998
1	Torino	1999
1	Genzano	2000
1	Perugia	2005
1	Montesilvano	2010
1	Pescara	2015
1	Asti	2016
1	Acqua e Sapone	2018
1	Feldi Eboli	2023
1	L84	2026
