= Napoli Calcio a 5 =

Italian futsal club

Napoli C5
- Full name: Napoli Calcio a 5
- Founded: 2003
- Ground: PalaCercola, Cercola
- Capacity: 1,500
- Chairman: Antonio Lugani
- Manager: Ivan Oranges
- League: Serie A
Home colours

Associazione Sportiva Dilettantistica Napoli Calcio a 5 is a futsal club based in Naples, Campania, Italy.

== Current squad ==
Note: Flags indicate national team as defined under FIFA eligibility rules; some limited exceptions apply. Players may hold more than one non-FIFA nationality.

No.	Pos.	Nation	Player
1		ITA	Pasquale Simeone
2		ITA	Gennaro Galletto
3		ITA	Rodrigo Bertoni
4		ITA	Antonio Pipolo
5		BRA	Evandro
7		ITA	Antonio Campano
8		ARG	Abdala
9		ITA	Vincenzo Botta

No.	Pos.	Nation	Player
10		ITA	Vincenzo Milucci
11		BRA	Noro
13		BRA	Bico
14		ITA	L. Campolongo
15		ITA	A. Arillo
16		ARG	Lucho
20		BRA	Leandro Garcia Pereira
22		BRA	Christian Bertoni

== See also ==
- SSC Napoli
