= Montesilvano =

City in Abruzzo, Italy

- Comune
- Città di Montesilvano
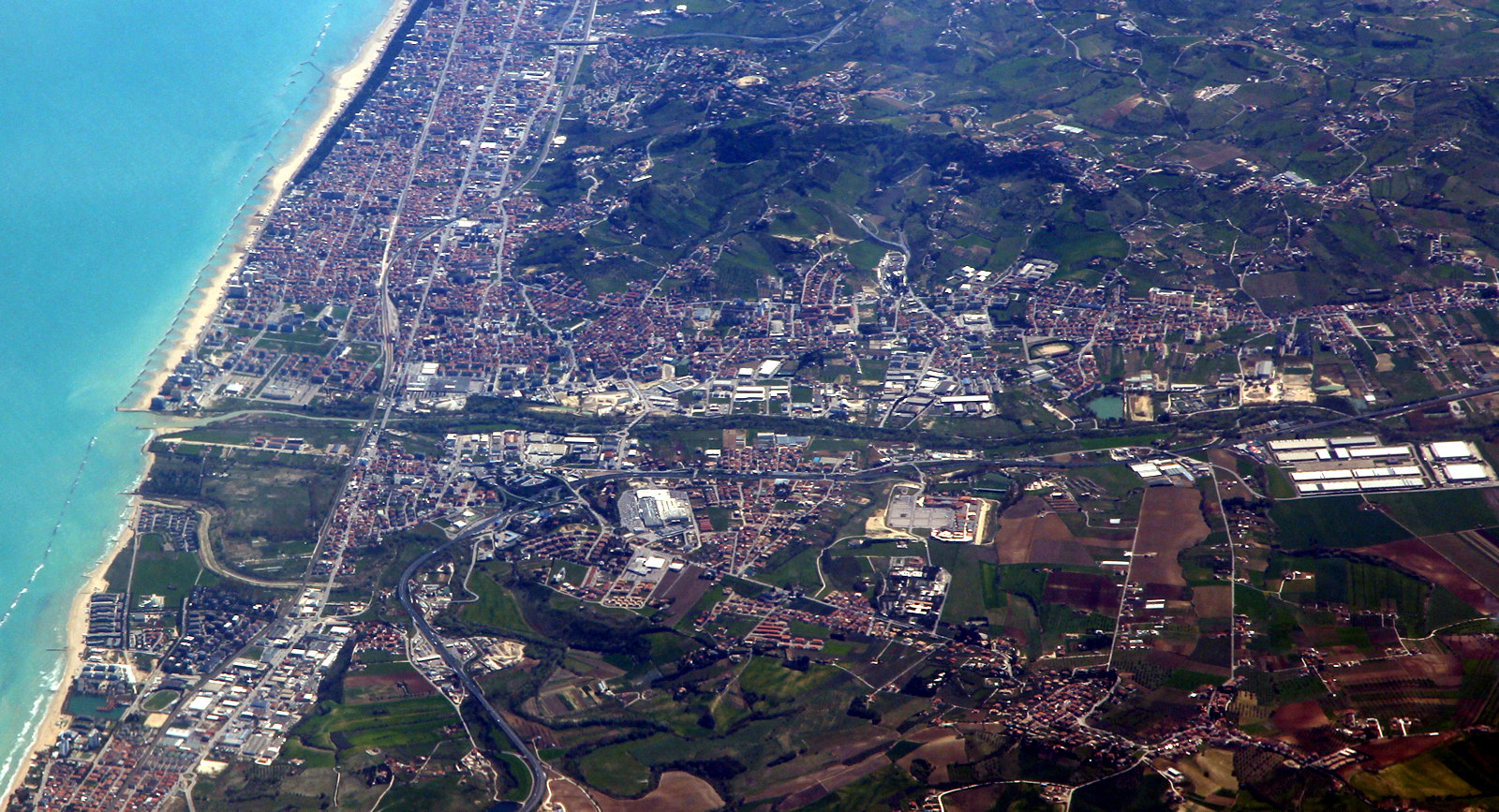
- Aerial view of Montesilvano

- Flag Coat of arms

- Location within Italy Location within Abruzzo
- Coordinates: 42°30′51″N 14°8′58″E
- Country: Italy
- Region: Abruzzo
- Province: Pescara (PE)
- Frazioni: Colonnetta, Case di Pietro, Fossonono, Mazzocco, Montesilvano Colle, Montesilvano Spiaggia, Santa Venere, Trave, Villa Verlengia, Villa Canonico, Villa Carmine, Villa Verrocchio

Government
  - Mayor: Ottavio De Martinis (Lega)

Area
  - Total: 23.57 km^{2} (9.10 sq mi)
- Elevation: 5 m (16 ft)

Population (1 January 2023)
  - Total: 53,275
  - Density: 2,260/km^{2} (5,854/sq mi)
- Demonym: Montesilvanesi
- Time zone: UTC+1 (CET)
  - Summer (DST): UTC+2 (CEST)
- Postal code: 65015 - 65016
- Dialing code: 085
- ISTAT code: 068024
- Patron saint: Sant'Antonio di Padova
- Website: Official website

Montesilvano (Italian pronunciation: [montesilˈvaːno]) is a city and comune of the province of Pescara, in the Abruzzo region of Italy.

== Geography ==
Montesilvano is located on the Adriatic Sea immediately north of Pescara, to which it is physically connected. It is divided into Montesilvano Marina and Montesilvano Colle. The first is a seaside resort; the second is the original medieval comune and citadel. Montesilvano is a two-hour drive from Rome and is close to Abruzzo Airport and Pescara Centrale railway station. The mouth of the Saline river is directly north of the town.

== Demographics ==
Historical population

Year	Pop.	±%
1861	2,253	—
1871	2,504	+11.1%
1881	2,605	+4.0%
1901	3,607	+38.5%
1911	3,905	+8.3%
1921	4,510	+15.5%
1931	5,433	+20.5%
1936	5,909	+8.8%

Year	Pop.	±%
1951	7,387	+25.0%
1961	10,420	+41.1%
1971	18,265	+75.3%
1981	29,240	+60.1%
1991	35,153	+20.2%
2001	40,700	+15.8%
2011	50,413	+23.9%
2021	53,402	+5.9%

Source: ISTAT

== Administration ==
The 2019 Italian local elections saw Ottavio De Martinis, standing for Lega, elected as the Mayor of Montesilvano.

On 25 May 2014, the city residents, alongside residents of neighboring cities of Pescara and Spoltore voted in a referendum on merging into a single city. Montesilvano voters approved the merger with 52.23% of the votes. The regional law approving the merger was passed on 8 August 2018, with a target date of 1 January 2022. It was later pushed back to 2023, and then again to 2027.

== Twin towns — sister cities ==
Montesilvano is twinned with:

- Gradiška, Bosnia and Herzegovina, since 2018
- (Transnistria) Bender, Moldova
- Hajdúböszörmény, Hungary

== Notable people ==
- Giò Di Tonno, singer
- Dean Martin, singer and movie star whose father was from Montesilvano
- Franco Marini, politician, Montesilvano senator and president of the Italian Senate
