= Marca Futsal =

Italian futsal club

A.S.D. Marca Futsal
- Full name: Associazione Sportiva Dilettantistica Marca Futsal
- Founded: 2005
- Dissolved: 2014
- Ground: PalaMazzalovo, Montebelluna, Italy
- Capacity: 1,100
- Chairman: Massimo Bello
- Manager: Julio Fernández Correa
- 2013-14: Serie A1 (Futsal), Champion
Home colours	Away colours	Third colours

Marca Futsal is a futsal club based in Castelfranco Veneto, Treviso Italy. The club was founded in 2005 as "Marca Trevigiana C5" and changed name in 2009; its stadium is Palasport PalaMazzalovo of Montebelluna with 1,100 seats.

== Honours ==
- 2 Serie A: 2010–11, 2012–13
- 1 Coppa Italia: 2010
- 2 Supercoppa Italiana: 2010, 2011
- 1 Campionato Serie A2: 2007

== Roster 2012/2013 ==
Note: Flags indicate national team as defined under FIFA eligibility rules; some limited exceptions apply. Players may hold more than one non-FIFA nationality.

No.	Pos.	Nation	Player
1	GK	ITA	Gabriel Miraglia
2		ITA	Marco Ercolessi
3		ESP	Borja Blanco Gil
4		ITA	Marco Caverzan
5		ITA	Luiz Filipe Follador
6		ARG	Fernando Wilhelm (captain)
7		BRA	Chimanguinho
8		ITA	Vinicius Omori Duarte

No.	Pos.	Nation	Player
11		BRA	Bebetinho
12	GK	BRA	Guilherme Kuromoto
14		ITA	Patrick Nora
15		ITA	Edgar Bertoni Rocha
18		ITA	Leonardo Calmonte
20		ITA	Jonas
-	GK	ITA	Giobatta Bianchini
-	FW	ROU	Andrei Dan

== UEFA club competitions record ==
=== UEFA Futsal Cup ===
Season	Competition	Round	Country	Opponent	Result	Venue
2011/12	UEFA Futsal Cup	Main Round	(Finland)	Ilves	6–0	Târgu Mureș
2011/12	UEFA Futsal Cup	Main Round	(Croatia)	MNK Split	4–1	Târgu Mureș
2011/12	UEFA Futsal Cup	Main Round	(Romania)	City'US	5–2	Târgu Mureș
2011/12	UEFA Futsal Cup	Elite Round	(Slovakia)	Slov-Matic	3–1	Padua
2011/12	UEFA Futsal Cup	Elite Round	(Ukraine)	Uragan	4–2	Padua
2011/12	UEFA Futsal Cup	Elite Round	(Italy)	Montesilvano	2–2	Padua
2011/12	UEFA Futsal Cup	Final Four	(Russia)	MFK Dinamo Moskva	0–3	Lleida
2011/12	UEFA Futsal Cup	Final Four	(Portugal)	Sporting CP	3 (4) –3 (3)	Lleida
