= Real Rieti Calcio a 5 =

Italian futsal club

Real Rieti
- Full name: Real Rieti Calcio a 5
- Founded: 1999
- Ground: PalaMalfatti, Rieti
- Capacity: 1,500
- Chairman: Roberto Pietropaoli
- Manager: Diego Giustozzi
- League: Serie A
Home colours

Real Rieti Calcio a 5 is a futsal club based in Rieti, Lazio, Italy.

== Players and coaches ==
Note: Flags indicate national team as defined under FIFA eligibility rules; some limited exceptions apply. Players may hold more than one non-FIFA nationality.

No.	Pos.	Nation	Player
1	GK	ITA	Jhonson
3	FW	ALB	Roald Halimi
4	DF	ITA	Douglas Corsini
5	DF	ITA	Rafael Rizzi
6	FW	ITA	Alessio Martinelli
7	DF	ITA	Andrea Romano
8	DF	BRA	Jeffe
9	FW	ESP	Pedrito
10	DF	BRA	Duio
11	FW	BRA	Luizinho
12	GK	ITA	Giuseppe Micoli
13	FW	BRA	Vieira

No.	Pos.	Nation	Player
14	FW	ESP	Saúl
15	FW	ITA	Edoardo Scappa
16	FW	ESP	Israel Caro
17	FW	BRA	Luis Turmena
18	DF	ITA	Nicolò Fasciolo
19	DF	ITA	Paolo Cesaroni
20	FW	ITA	Simone Caloisi
21	DF	ITA	Cristiano Santarelli
22	FW	ITA	Andrea Mancini
23	FW	ESP	Francisco Nunez Paulos
24	GK	ITA	Filippo Angelini
25	DF	ITA	Samuele Leuratti

== Famous players ==
- (Italy) Michele Miarelli
- (Italy) Marcio Forte
- (Italy) Massimo De Luca
- (Argentina) Diego Giustozzi
