= Kaos Futsal =

Italian futsal club

- Full name: Associazione Sportiva Dilettantistica Kaos Futsal
- Founded: 1983
- Ground: PalaCarife, Ferrara
- Capacity: 3,500
- Chairman: Angelo Barbi
- Manager: Leopoldo Capurso
- League: Serie A
Home colours

Associazione Sportiva Dilettantistica Kaos Futsal is a futsal club based in Bologna, Emilia-Romagna, Italy.

== Current squad ==
Note: Flags indicate national team as defined under FIFA eligibility rules; some limited exceptions apply. Players may hold more than one non-FIFA nationality.

No.	Pos.	Nation	Player
—		(Italy) ITA	Timm
—		(Italy) ITA	Boaventura
—		(Brazil) BRA	Juninho
—		(Brazil) BRA	Laion
—		(Italy) ITA	Failla
—		(Brazil) BRA	André
—		(Spain) ESP	Tuli
—		(Brazil) BRA	Coco
—		(Brazil) BRA	Scandolara

No.	Pos.	Nation	Player
—		(Brazil) BRA	Urio
—		(Brazil) BRA	Pereira
—		(Brazil) BRA	Pedotti
—		(Brazil) BRA	Kakà
—		(Brazil) BRA	Vinicius
—		(Brazil) BRA	Jeffe
—		(Italy) ITA	Zannoni
—		(Italy) ITA	Petriglieri

== Famous players ==
- (Brazil) Kakà
