= Divisione Calcio a 5 =

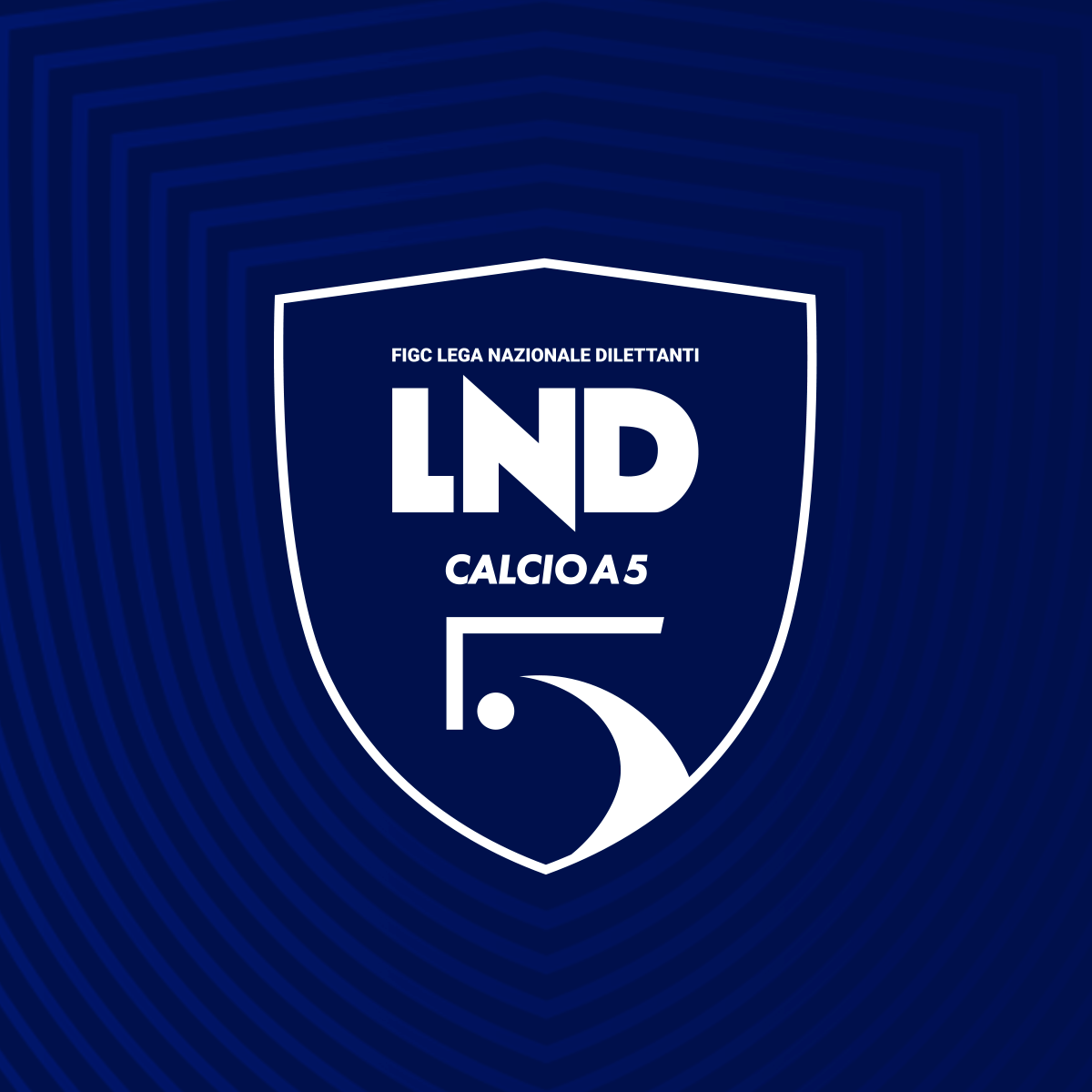
Logo of Divisione Calcio a 5

The Divisione Calcio a 5 is the organization controlling the Futsal in Italy.

== Controlling competition ==
=== Men's ===
- Serie A1
- Serie A2
- Serie B
- Coppa Italia Serie A
- Final Eight of coppa Italia Serie A2
- Final Eight of coppa Italia Serie B
- Supercoppa Italiana
- Campionato Nazionale Under 21 (216 teams)
- Final Eight of coppa Italia Under 21
- Fasi Nazionali dei Tornei Regionali (Young, Coppa Italia Regionale)

=== Women's ===
- Fasi nazionali dei tornei Femminili di Calcio a 5
