= Luparense FC (futsal) =

Italian futsal club

Luparense
- Full name: Luparense Calcio a 5
- Founded: 1996
- Ground: Pala Due, Bassano del Grappa, Italy
- Capacity: 800
- Chairman: Stefano Zarattini
- Manager: Valter Ferraro
- League: Serie A (Futsal)
| Home colours | Away colours |

Luparense Football Club, is a futsal club based in San Martino di Lupari, Italy. It is the same club that operates the association football section of the same name.

== History ==
The club was founded in 1996 formed after a merger of A.S.D. Luparense Calcio a 5 and A.S.D. Radio Birikina Luparense, the local futsal and football clubs. It is the most successful futsal club of Italy.

== Sponsorship ==
The club was sponsored for several years by Alter Ego.

== Ground ==
Its stadium is Palasport San Martino di Lupari with 800 seats.

== Notable players ==
Internationally capped players

- (Brazil) (Italy) Humberto Honorio (2006-2015)
- (Brazil) (Italy) Vampeta (2004-2012)

== Honours ==
- Serie A1: 2006–2007, 2007–2008, 2008–2009, 2011–2012, 2013-2014
- Coppa Italia: 2006, 2008, 2013
- Supercoppa Italiana: 2007, 2008, 2009, 2012, 2013
- Coppa Italia Serie B: 2001

== UEFA Club Competitions Record ==
=== UEFA Futsal Cup ===
| Season | Competition | Round | Country | Opponent | Result | Venue |
|---|---|---|---|---|---|---|
| 2012/13 | UEFA Futsal Cup | Main Round | (Bulgaria) | Varna | 2–0 | Nicosia |
| 2012/13 | UEFA Futsal Cup | Main Round | (Slovakia) | Slov-Matic | 0–0 | Nicosia |
| 2012/13 | UEFA Futsal Cup | Main Round | (Cyprus) | Omonia | 5–1 | Nicosia |
| 2012/13 | UEFA Futsal Cup | Elite Round | (Georgia (country)) | Iberia Star | 1–6 | Tbilisi |
| 2012/13 | UEFA Futsal Cup | Elite Round | (Portugal) | Benfica | 2–3 | Tbilisi |
| 2012/13 | UEFA Futsal Cup | Elite Round | (Hungary) | Győri | 2–3 | Tbilisi |
