= SS Lazio Calcio a 5 =

Italian football club

Lazio
- Full name: A.S.D. S.S. Lazio Calcio a 5
- Ground: Rome
- Chairman: Luciano Chilelli
- Head Coach: Gianfranco Angelini
- League: Serie A
- 2017-18: Serie A
Home colours	Away colours

A.S.D. S.S. Lazio calcio a 5, also known as S.S. Lazio or just Lazio, is an Italian five-a-side football club based in Rome, Italy is the five-a-side section of S.S. Lazio multi-sport club. The male and female team of Lazio Calcio played in the male Serie A and female Serie A leagues respectively.

== Honours ==
- Serie A1: 1

1997-98

- Coppa Italia: 4

1998, 1999, 2003, 2011

== See also ==
- S.S. Lazio
