= UEFA Futsal Euro 2018 squads =

This article lists the confirmed national futsal squads for the UEFA Futsal Euro 2018 tournament held in Slovenia, between 30 January and 10 February 2018.

== Group A ==
=== Slovenia ===
Slovenia named their squad on 19 January 2018.

Head coach: Andrej Dobovičnik

No.	Pos.	Player	Date of birth (age)	Club
1	GK	Damir Puškar	3 September 1987 (aged 30)	(Football Association of Slovenia) KMN Dobovec
12	GK	Vid Sever	21 September 1989 (aged 28)	(Football Association of Slovenia) FC Litija
2	FP	Rok Mordej	3 March 1989 (aged 28)	(Football Association of Slovenia) KMN Dobovec
3	FP	Dejan Bizjak	21 April 1988 (aged 29)	(Italian Football Federation) Lazio
4	FP	Anže Širok	10 November 1989 (aged 28)	(Football Association of Slovenia) Oplast Kobarid
5	FP	Kristjan Čujec	30 November 1988 (aged 29)	(Football Association of Slovenia) KMN Dobovec
6	FP	Denis Totošković	18 November 1987 (aged 30)	(Football Association of Slovenia) FC Litija
7	FP	Igor Osredkar	28 June 1986 (aged 31)	(Croatian Football Federation) Makarska
8	FP	Teo Turk	15 March 1996 (aged 21)	(Football Association of Slovenia) FC Litija
9	FP	Gašper Vrhovec	18 July 1988 (aged 29)	(Football Association of Slovenia) FC Litija
10	FP	Alen Fetić	14 October 1991 (aged 26)	(Football Association of Slovenia) FC Litija
11	FP	Tilen Štendler	18 October 1991 (aged 26)	(Italian Football Federation) Maccan
13	FP	Žiga Čeh	25 January 1995 (aged 23)	(Italian Football Federation) Imola
14	FP	Matej Fideršek	4 July 1991 (aged 26)	(Croatian Football Federation) Split Tommy

=== Italy ===
Italy named their squad on 28 January 2018.

Head coach: Roberto Menichelli

No.	Pos.	Player	Date of birth (age)	Club
1	GK	Stefano Mammarella	2 February 1984 (aged 33)	(Italian Football Federation) Acqua e Sapone
12	GK	Michele Miarelli	29 April 1984 (aged 33)	(Italian Football Federation) Luparense
2	FP	Marco Ercolessi	15 May 1986 (aged 31)	(Italian Football Federation) Pescara
3	FP	Gabriel Lima	19 August 1987 (aged 30)	(Italian Football Federation) Acqua e Sapone
4	FP	Sergio Romano	28 September 1987 (aged 30)	(Italian Football Federation) Real Rieti
6	FP	Humberto Honorio	21 July 1983 (aged 34)	(Italian Football Federation) Luparense
7	FP	Massimo De Luca	7 October 1987 (aged 30)	(Italian Football Federation) Napoli
9	FP	Júlio de Oliveira	8 June 1991 (aged 26)	(Italian Football Federation) Acqua e Sapone
10	FP	Alex Merlim	15 July 1986 (aged 31)	(Portuguese Football Federation) Sporting CP
11	FP	Cristiano Fusari	3 October 1991 (aged 26)	(Italian Football Federation) Kaos Reggio Emilia
13	FP	Giuliano Fortini	8 September 1996 (aged 21)	(Italian Football Federation) Pesarofano
15	FP	Murilo	10 March 1989 (aged 28)	(Italian Football Federation) Acqua e Sapone
17	FP	Nicolò Baron	30 July 1996 (aged 21)	(Italian Football Federation) Feldi Eboli
18	FP	Fabricio Calderolli	2 January 1986 (aged 32)	(Italian Football Federation) Acqua e Sapone

=== Serbia ===
Serbia named their squad on 29 January 2018.

Head coach: Goran Ivančić

No.	Pos.	Player	Date of birth (age)	Club
1	GK	Miodrag Aksentijević	22 July 1983 (aged 34)	(Russian Football Union) Tyumen
12	GK	Nemanja Momčilović	15 April 1991 (aged 26)	(Football Association of Serbia) Ekonomac
20	FP	Jakov Vulić	10 March 1992 (aged 25)	(Football Association of Serbia) Nova Pazova
2	FP	Marko Perić	5 February 1984 (aged 33)	(Italian Football Federation) Napoli
3	FP	Nikola Matijević	26 December 1991 (aged 26)	(Football Association of Serbia) Ekonomac
4	FP	Stefan Rakić	22 November 1993 (aged 24)	(Romanian Football Federation) Informatica Timișoara
5	FP	Vladimir Milosavac	1 December 1985 (aged 32)	(Football Association of Serbia) KMF Internacional Novi Sad
6	FP	Denis Ramić	17 November 1994 (aged 23)	(Football Association of Serbia) Ekonomac
7	FP	Dragan Tomić	25 March 1991 (aged 26)	(Lebanese Football Association) Bank of Beirut
8	FP	Andrija Stanković	13 August 1989 (aged 28)	(Football Association of Serbia) KMF Fon Beograd
9	FP	Marko Radovanović	10 October 1991 (aged 26)	(Lebanese Football Association) Louaize Futsal Club
10	FP	Mladen Kocić	22 October 1988 (aged 29)	(Russian Football Union) Tyumen
11	FP	Miloš Simić	12 August 1989 (aged 28)	(Romanian Football Federation) Informatica Timișoara
14	FP	Slobodan Rajčević	28 February 1985 (aged 32)	(Football Association of Serbia) Ekonomac

== Group B ==
=== Russia ===
Russia named their squad on 28 January 2018.

Head coach: Sergey Skorovich

No.	Pos.	Player	Date of birth (age)	Club
1	GK	Georgi Zamtaradze	12 February 1987 (aged 30)	(Russian Football Union) MFK KPRF
12	GK	Dmitrii Putilov	5 December 1994 (aged 23)	(Russian Football Union) Sinara Yekaterinburg
4	FP	Dmitri Lyskov	24 September 1987 (aged 30)	(Russian Football Union) Gazprom-Ugra
5	FP	Rômulo	28 September 1986 (aged 31)	(Russian Football Union) Gazprom-Ugra
7	FP	Ivan Milovanov	8 February 1989 (aged 28)	(Russian Football Union) Tyumen
8	FP	Eder Lima	29 June 1984 (aged 33)	(Brazilian Football Confederation) Magnus Futsal
9	FP	Sergei Abramov	9 September 1990 (aged 27)	(Russian Football Union) Sinara Yekaterinburg
10	FP	Robinho	28 January 1983 (aged 35)	(Portuguese Football Federation) Benfica
11	FP	Artem Niyazov	30 July 1996 (aged 21)	(Russian Football Union) MFK KPRF
13	FP	Sergei Abramovich	15 January 1990 (aged 28)	(Russian Football Union) Tyumen
14	FP	Daniil Davydov	23 January 1989 (aged 29)	(Russian Football Union) Gazprom-Ugra
18	FP	Andrei Afanasyev	23 May 1983 (aged 34)	(Russian Football Union) Gazprom-Ugra
19	FP	Ivan Chishkala	11 July 1995 (aged 22)	(Russian Football Union) Gazprom-Ugra
20	FP	Esquerdinha	18 November 1985 (aged 32)	(Royal Spanish Football Federation) FC Barcelona

=== Kazakhstan ===
Head coach: (Brazil) Cacau

No.	Pos.	Player	Date of birth (age)	Club
1	GK	Grigori Shamro	5 July 1984 (aged 33)	(Kazakhstan Football Federation) Aktobe
2	GK	Higuita	6 June 1986 (aged 31)	(Kazakhstan Football Federation) Kairat
4	FP	Taynan da Silva	12 February 1993 (aged 24)	(Kazakhstan Football Federation) Kairat
5	FP	Serik Zhamankulov	18 November 1983 (aged 34)	(Kazakhstan Football Federation) Kairat
8	FP	Dinmukhambet Suleimenov	25 August 1981 (aged 36)	(Kazakhstan Football Federation) Kairat
9	FP	Aleksandr Dovgan	9 February 1988 (aged 29)	(Kazakhstan Football Federation) Zhetysu-Taldykorgan
10	FP	Chingiz Yesenamanov	10 March 1989 (aged 28)	(Kazakhstan Football Federation) Kairat
11	FP	Mikhail Pershin	19 October 1989 (aged 28)	(Kazakhstan Football Federation) Kairat
12	FP	Pavel Taku	30 August 1988 (aged 29)	(Kazakhstan Football Federation) Aktobe
14	FP	Douglas Jr.	15 October 1988 (aged 29)	(Kazakhstan Football Federation) Kairat
15	FP	Dauren Tursagulov	16 January 1996 (aged 22)	(Kazakhstan Football Federation) Zhetysu-Taldykorgan
18	FP	Dauren Nurgozhin	21 May 1990 (aged 27)	(Kazakhstan Football Federation) Kairat
19	FP	Albert Akbalikov	5 January 1995 (aged 23)	(Kazakhstan Football Federation) Aktobe
20	FP	Birzhan Orazov	17 October 1994 (aged 23)	(Kazakhstan Football Federation) Zhetysu-Taldykorgan

=== Poland ===
Poland named their squad on 27 January 2018.

Head coach: Błażej Korczyński

No.	Pos.	Player	Date of birth (age)	Club
1	GK	Michał Kałuża	22 July 1998 (aged 19)	(Polish Football Association) Rekord Bielsko-Biała
12	GK	Michał Widuch	11 April 1992 (aged 25)	(Polish Football Association) Piast Gliwice
2	FP	Michał Kubik	7 May 1990 (aged 27)	(Polish Football Association) Rekord Bielsko-Biała
3	FP	Przemysław Dewucki	3 September 1988 (aged 29)	(Polish Football Association) Piast Gliwice
4	FP	Mateusz Cyman	10 October 1991 (aged 26)	(Polish Football Association) FC Toruń
5	FP	Robert Gładczak	10 April 1988 (aged 29)	(Polish Football Association) Clearex Chorzów
6	FP	Maciej Mizgajski	16 January 1988 (aged 30)	(Polish Football Association) Clearex Chorzów
7	FP	Mikołaj Zastawnik	2 September 1996 (aged 21)	(Polish Football Association) Clearex Chorzów
8	FP	Dominik Solecki	17 July 1990 (aged 27)	(Polish Football Association) Red Dragons Pniewy
9	FP	Tomasz Lutecki	1 September 1991 (aged 26)	(Polish Football Association) GSF Gliwice
10	FP	Marcin Mikołajewicz (C)	22 October 1982 (aged 35)	(Polish Football Association) FC Toruń
11	FP	Artur Popławski	4 October 1988 (aged 29)	(Polish Football Association) Rekord Bielsko-Biała
13	FP	Tomasz Kriezel	5 November 1993 (aged 24)	(Polish Football Association) FC Toruń
15	FP	Sebastian Wojciechowski	17 January 1988 (aged 30)	(Polish Football Association) Red Devils Chojnice

== Group C ==
=== Portugal ===
Portugal named their squad on 26 January 2018.

Head coach: Jorge Braz

No.	Pos.	Player	Date of birth (age)	Club
1	GK	Bebé	19 May 1983 (aged 34)	(Portuguese Football Federation) Leões de Porto Salvo
12	GK	André Sousa	25 February 1986 (aged 31)	(Portuguese Football Federation) Sporting CP
14	GK	Vítor Hugo	30 November 1982 (aged 35)	(Portuguese Football Federation) Braga/AAUM
2	FP	André Coelho	30 October 1993 (aged 24)	(Portuguese Football Federation) Benfica
3	FP	Tunha Lam	24 October 1984 (aged 33)	(Portuguese Football Federation) Belenenses
4	FP	Nílson Miguel	10 May 1992 (aged 25)	(Portuguese Football Federation) Braga/AAUM
5	FP	Fábio Cecílio	30 April 1993 (aged 24)	(Portuguese Football Federation) Benfica
6	FP	Pedro Cary	10 May 1984 (aged 33)	(Portuguese Football Federation) Sporting CP
7	FP	Bruno Coelho	1 August 1987 (aged 30)	(Portuguese Football Federation) Benfica
8	FP	Márcio Moreira	24 June 1990 (aged 27)	(Portuguese Football Federation) AD Fundão
9	FP	João Matos	21 February 1987 (aged 30)	(Portuguese Football Federation) Sporting CP
10	FP	Ricardinho	3 September 1985 (aged 32)	(Royal Spanish Football Federation) Inter Movistar
11	FP	Pany Varela	25 February 1989 (aged 28)	(Portuguese Football Federation) Sporting CP
13	FP	Tiago Brito	22 July 1991 (aged 26)	(Portuguese Football Federation) Benfica

=== Ukraine ===
Ukraine named their squad on 29 January 2018.

Head coach: Olexandr Kosenko

No.	Pos.	Player	Date of birth (age)	Club
1	GK	Yevhen Ivanyak	28 September 1982 (aged 35)	(Ukrainian Association of Football) Uragan
12	GK	Dmytro Lytvynenko	16 April 1987 (aged 30)	(Football Association of the Czech Republic) Era-Pack
17	GK	Kyrylo Tsypun	30 July 1987 (aged 30)	(Ukrainian Association of Football) Prodexim Kherson
4	FP	Volodymyr Razuvanov	1 August 1992 (aged 25)	(Russian Football Union) Dina
5	FP	Andrii Khamdamov	5 December 1993 (aged 24)	(Ukrainian Association of Football) Sokil
7	FP	Mykola Grytsyna	13 June 1989 (aged 28)	(Football Federation of Belarus) Stalitsa
8	FP	Taras Korolyshyn	18 February 1993 (aged 24)	(Football Federation of Belarus) Stalitsa
9	FP	Ruslan Sheremeta	15 January 1992 (aged 26)	(Ukrainian Association of Football) Sokil
10	FP	Serhiy Zhurba	14 March 1987 (aged 30)	(Ukrainian Association of Football) HIT Kyiv
11	FP	Mykhailo Grytsyna	19 October 1991 (aged 26)	(Football Federation of Belarus) Stalitsa
14	FP	Petro Shoturma	27 June 1992 (aged 25)	(Ukrainian Association of Football) Uragan
15	FP	Mykola Bilotserkivets	5 December 1986 (aged 31)	(Russian Football Union) Norilsk Nickel
18	FP	Andrii Lysenko	6 March 1994 (aged 23)	(Ukrainian Association of Football) Sokil
19	FP	Oleksandr Pediash	4 March 1994 (aged 23)	(Ukrainian Association of Football) Sokil

=== Romania ===
Romania named their squad on 26 January 2018.

Head coach: Robert Lupu

No.	Pos.	Player	Date of birth (age)	Club
1	GK	Vlad Iancu	3 January 1978 (aged 40)	(Romanian Football Federation) Informatica Timișoara
12	GK	Toni Toniţa	28 January 1992 (aged 26)	(Romanian Football Federation) Autobergamo Deva
2	FP	Florin Matei	8 December 1983 (aged 34)	(Romanian Football Federation) Autobergamo Deva
3	FP	Marius Matei	12 March 1987 (aged 30)	(Romanian Football Federation) Autobergamo Deva
6	FP	Emil Răducu	19 May 1984 (aged 33)	(Malta Football Association) Luxol
7	FP	Florin Ignat	26 February 1982 (aged 35)	(Romanian Football Federation) Autobergamo Deva
8	FP	Octavian Cireș	27 January 1993 (aged 25)	(Romanian Football Federation) United Galați
9	FP	Felipe Oliveira	16 December 1992 (aged 25)	(Romanian Football Federation) Informatica Timișoara
10	FP	Dumitru Stoica	30 September 1981 (aged 36)	(Romanian Football Federation) Autobergamo Deva
11	FP	Sávio Valadares	30 January 1994 (aged 24)	(Romanian Football Federation) Informatica Timișoara
15	FP	László Szőcs	10 December 1984 (aged 33)	(Romanian Football Federation) Odorheiu Secuiesc
17	FP	Csoma Alpar	22 March 1984 (aged 33)	(Romanian Football Federation) Autobergamo Deva
18	FP	Paulo Ferreira	8 March 1985 (aged 32)	(Romanian Football Federation) Autobergamo Deva
20	FP	Adrian Pânzaru	6 November 1985 (aged 32)	(Romanian Football Federation) Autobergamo Deva

== Group D ==
=== Spain ===
Spain named their squad on 15 January 2018.

Head coach: José Venancio

No.	Pos.	Player	Date of birth (age)	Club
1	GK	Paco Sedano	2 December 1979 (aged 38)	(Royal Spanish Football Federation) FC Barcelona
13	GK	Jesús Herrero	4 November 1986 (aged 31)	(Royal Spanish Football Federation) Inter Movistar
2	FP	Carlos Ortiz	3 October 1983 (aged 34)	(Royal Spanish Football Federation) Inter Movistar
3	FP	Marc Tolrà	27 January 1991 (aged 27)	(Royal Spanish Football Federation) FC Barcelona
4	FP	Bebe	28 May 1990 (aged 27)	(Royal Spanish Football Federation) Inter Movistar
5	FP	Adolfo Fernández	19 May 1993 (aged 24)	(Royal Spanish Football Federation) FC Barcelona
6	FP	Francisco Solano	26 August 1991 (aged 26)	(Royal Spanish Football Federation) Inter Movistar
7	FP	Pola	26 June 1988 (aged 29)	(Royal Spanish Football Federation) Inter Movistar
8	FP	Lin	16 May 1986 (aged 31)	(Russian Football Union) MFK KPRF
9	FP	Sergio Lozano	9 November 1988 (aged 29)	(Royal Spanish Football Federation) FC Barcelona
10	FP	Rafa Usín	22 May 1987 (aged 30)	(Royal Spanish Football Federation) Magna Gurpea
11	FP	Miguelín	9 May 1985 (aged 32)	(Royal Spanish Football Federation) ElPozo Murcia
14	FP	Álex Yepes	12 March 1989 (aged 28)	(Royal Spanish Football Federation) ElPozo Murcia
15	FP	Joselito	1 March 1991 (aged 26)	(Royal Spanish Football Federation) FC Barcelona

=== Azerbaijan ===
Azerbaijan named their squad on 26 January 2018.

Head coach: (Brazil) Alesio da Silva

No.	Pos.	Player	Date of birth (age)	Club
1	GK	Emin Kurdov	10 July 1984 (aged 33)	(Association of Football Federations of Azerbaijan) Ekol
12	GK	Rovshan Huseynli	3 April 1991 (aged 26)	(Association of Football Federations of Azerbaijan) Araz
2	FP	Samir Hamzayev	1 August 1989 (aged 28)	(Association of Football Federations of Azerbaijan) Ekol
3	FP	Bolinha	19 February 1987 (aged 30)	(Association of Football Federations of Azerbaijan) Araz
4	FP	Isa Atayev	7 August 1989 (aged 28)	(Association of Football Federations of Azerbaijan) Araz
5	FP	Fineo	10 April 1987 (aged 30)	(Japan Football Association) Agleymina Hamamatsu
6	FP	Eduardo	14 October 1986 (aged 31)	(Association of Football Federations of Azerbaijan) Araz
7	FP	Ramiz Chovdarov	28 July 1990 (aged 27)	(Association of Football Federations of Azerbaijan) Araz
8	FP	Rizvan Farzaliyev	1 September 1979 (aged 38)	(Association of Football Federations of Azerbaijan) Araz
10	FP	Vassoura	26 April 1985 (aged 32)	(United Arab Emirates Football Association) Al Dhafrah
11	FP	Khatai Baghirov	15 August 1987 (aged 30)	(Association of Football Federations of Azerbaijan) Araz
13	FP	Everton Cardoso	4 December 1987 (aged 30)	(Association of Football Federations of Azerbaijan) Araz
14	FP	Vitaliy Borisov	5 July 1982 (aged 35)	(Football Association of Serbia) Ekonomac
18	FP	Namig Mammadkarimov	21 July 1980 (aged 37)	(Association of Football Federations of Azerbaijan) Ekol

=== France ===
France named their squad on 10 January 2018.

Head coach: Pierre Jacky

No.	Pos.	Player	Date of birth (age)	Club
1	GK	Djamel Haroun	6 July 1983 (aged 34)	(French Football Federation) Roubaix AFS
12	GK	Ba El Maarouf Kerroumi	1 June 1994 (aged 23)	(French Football Federation) Herouville
16	GK	Joévin Durot	25 November 1985 (aged 32)	(French Football Federation) My-Cars Roselies
2	FP	Sid Belhaj	28 August 1992 (aged 25)	(French Football Federation) Acces
5	FP	Boulaye Ba	21 May 1993 (aged 24)	(French Football Federation) Kremlin-Bicêtre
6	FP	Kévin Ramirez	10 August 1987 (aged 30)	(French Football Federation) Acces
7	FP	Michaël de Sá Andrade	14 August 1995 (aged 22)	(French Football Federation) Garges Djibson
8	FP	Azdine Aigoun	11 May 1987 (aged 30)	(French Football Federation) Kremlin-Bicêtre
10	FP	Abdessamad Mohammed	10 December 1990 (aged 27)	(French Football Federation) Acces
11	FP	Landry N'Gala	8 June 1993 (aged 24)	(French Football Federation) Garges Djibson
14	FP	Samir Alla	27 January 1985 (aged 33)	(French Football Federation) Herouville
18	FP	Samba Kebe	4 December 1987 (aged 30)	(French Football Federation) Garges Djibson
19	FP	Adrien Gasmi	25 March 1986 (aged 31)	(French Football Federation) Kremlin-Bicêtre
20	FP	Souheil Mouhoudine	29 March 1995 (aged 22)	(French Football Federation) Acces
