= UEFA Futsal Euro 2016 squads =

This article lists the confirmed national futsal squads for the UEFA Futsal Euro 2016 tournament held in Serbia, between 2 February and 13 February 2016.

== Group A ==
=== Serbia ===
Head coach: Aca Kovačević

| No. | Pos. | Player | Date of birth (age) | Caps | Goals | Club |
|---|---|---|---|---|---|---|
| 1 | GK | Miodrag Aksentijević | 22 July 1983 (aged 32) | | | (Russian Football Union) Tyumen |
| 2 | DF | Marko Perić | 5 February 1984 (aged 31) | | | (Italian Football Federation) Kaos Futsal |
| 3 | DF | Aleksandar Živanović | 24 July 1988 (aged 27) | | | (Football Association of Serbia) Deus |
| 4 | FW | Stefan Rakić | 22 November 1993 (aged 22) | | | (Romanian Football Federation) Informatica |
| 5 | FW | Marko Radovanović | 10 October 1991 (aged 24) | | | (Football Association of Serbia) Ekonomac |
| 6 | FW | Dušan Milojević | 6 March 1986 (aged 29) | | | (Football Association of Serbia) Kalča Memoris |
| 7 | DF | Slobodan Janjić | 17 February 1987 (aged 28) | | | (Romanian Football Federation) Informatica |
| 8 | FW | Marko Pršić | 13 September 1990 (aged 25) | | | (Football Association of Serbia) Ekonomac |
| 9 | DF | Vladimir Lazić | 19 June 1984 (aged 31) | | | (Kazakhstan Football Federation) Astana - Tulpar |
| 10 | FW | Mladen Kocić | 22 October 1988 (aged 27) | | | (Croatian Football Federation) Nacional |
| 11 | DF | Miloš Simić | 12 August 1989 (aged 26) | | | (Football Association of Serbia) Ekonomac |
| 12 | GK | Nemanja Momčilović | 15 April 1991 (aged 24) | | | (Latvian Football Federation) Nikars |
| 13 | FW | Miloš Stojković | 3 October 1991 (aged 24) | | | (Football Association of Serbia) Ekonomac |
| 14 | FW | Slobodan Rajčević | 28 February 1985 (aged 30) | | | (Lebanese Football Association) Al Mayadeen |

=== Portugal ===
Head coach: Jorge Braz

| No. | Pos. | Player | Date of birth (age) | Caps | Goals | Club |
|---|---|---|---|---|---|---|
| 1 | GK | Bebé | 19 May 1983 (aged 32) | 64 | 0 | (Portuguese Football Federation) Benfica |
| 2 | DF | Paulinho | 12 March 1983 (aged 32) | 64 | 13 | (Portuguese Football Federation) Sporting CP |
| 3 | DF | Bruno Coelho | 1 August 1987 (aged 28) | 55 | 11 | (Portuguese Football Federation) Benfica |
| 4 | DF | Pedro Cary | 10 May 1984 (aged 31) | 104 | 29 | (Portuguese Football Federation) Sporting CP |
| 5 | DF | Fábio Cecílio | 30 April 1993 (aged 22) | 22 | 8 | (Portuguese Football Federation) Benfica |
| 6 | DF | Arnaldo Pereira | 16 June 1979 (aged 36) | 201 | 98 | (Italian Football Federation) Latina |
| 7 | FW | Cardinal | 26 June 1985 (aged 30) | 91 | 70 | (Royal Spanish Football Federation) Inter |
| 8 | DF | Djô | 11 January 1986 (aged 30) | 43 | 9 | (Portuguese Football Federation) Sporting CP |
| 9 | DF | João Matos | 21 February 1987 (aged 28) | 89 | 13 | (Portuguese Football Federation) Sporting CP |
| 10 | FW | Ricardinho | 3 September 1985 (aged 30) | 119 | 99 | (Royal Spanish Football Federation) Inter |
| 11 | FW | Anilton | 25 February 1989 (aged 26) | 4 | 0 | (Portuguese Football Federation) Fundão |
| 12 | GK | Vítor Hugo | 30 November 1982 (aged 33) | 31 | 1 | (Portuguese Football Federation) SC Braga |
| 13 | FW | Tiago Brito | 22 July 1991 (aged 24) | 22 | 4 | (Portuguese Football Federation) SC Braga |
| 14 | FW | Fábio Lima | 16 October 1988 (aged 27) | 21 | 5 | (Portuguese Football Federation) Sporting CP |

=== Slovenia ===
Head coach: Andrej Dobovičnik

| No. | Pos. | Player | Date of birth (age) | Caps | Goals | Club |
|---|---|---|---|---|---|---|
| 1 | GK | Damir Puškar | 3 September 1987 (aged 28) | | | (Football Association of Slovenia) Brezje Maribor |
| 2 | DF | Rok Mordej | 4 March 1989 (aged 26) | | | (Football Association of Slovenia) Dobovec |
| 3 | FW | Matej Fideršek | 4 July 1991 (aged 24) | | | (Football Association of Slovenia) Brezje Maribor |
| 4 | FW | Anže Širok | 10 November 1989 (aged 26) | | | (Football Association of Slovenia) Oplast Kobarid |
| 5 | FW | Kristjan Čujec | 30 January 1988 (aged 28) | | | (Croatian Football Federation) Nacional |
| 6 | DF | Uroš Kroflič | 2 November 1987 (aged 28) | | | (Football Association of Slovenia) Dobovec |
| 7 | DF | Igor Osredkar | 28 June 1986 (aged 29) | | | (Croatian Football Federation) Nacional |
| 8 | DF | Nejc Hozjan | 31 July 1996 (aged 19) | | | (Italian Football Federation) Montesilvano |
| 9 | FW | Gašper Vrhovec | 18 July 1988 (aged 27) | | | (Football Association of Slovenia) Litija |
| 10 | FW | Alen Fetić | 14 October 1991 (aged 24) | | | (Croatian Football Federation) Split Tommy |
| 11 | DF | Tilen Štendler | 18 October 1991 (aged 24) | | | (Italian Football Federation) Adriatica |
| 12 | GK | Alen Mordej | 13 March 1990 (aged 25) | | | (Football Association of Slovenia) Dobovec |
| 13 | FW | Jaka Sovdat | 2 June 1983 (aged 32) | | | (Football Association of Slovenia) Oplast Kobarid |
| 16 | GK | Igor Bratič | 29 October 1988 (aged 27) | | | (Football Association of Slovenia) Oplast Kobarid |

== Group B ==
=== Spain ===
Head coach: José Venancio López

| No. | Pos. | Player | Date of birth (age) | Caps | Goals | Club |
|---|---|---|---|---|---|---|
| 1 | GK | Paco Sedano | 2 December 1979 (aged 36) | | | (Royal Spanish Football Federation) FC Barcelona |
| 2 | DF | Carlos Ortiz | 3 October 1983 (aged 32) | | | (Royal Spanish Football Federation) Inter |
| 3 | DF | José Ruiz | 6 June 1983 (aged 32) | | | (Royal Spanish Football Federation) Murcia |
| 4 | FW | Mario Rivillos | 13 December 1989 (aged 26) | | | (Royal Spanish Football Federation) Inter |
| 5 | DF | Bebe | 28 May 1990 (aged 25) | | | (Royal Spanish Football Federation) Murcia |
| 6 | FW | Rafa Usín | 22 May 1987 (aged 28) | | | (Royal Spanish Football Federation) FC Barcelona |
| 7 | FW | Pola | 26 June 1988 (aged 27) | | | (Royal Spanish Football Federation) Inter |
| 8 | FW | Lin | 16 May 1986 (aged 29) | | | (Royal Spanish Football Federation) FC Barcelona |
| 9 | FW | Alex | 12 March 1989 (aged 26) | | | (Royal Spanish Football Federation) Murcia |
| 10 | DF | Andresito | 24 March 1991 (aged 24) | | | (Royal Spanish Football Federation) Ribera Navarra |
| 11 | FW | Miguelín | 9 May 1985 (aged 30) | | | (Royal Spanish Football Federation) Murcia |
| 12 | GK | Juanjo | 19 August 1985 (aged 30) | | | (Portuguese Football Federation) Benfica |
| 13 | GK | Jesús Herrero | 4 November 1986 (aged 29) | | | (Royal Spanish Football Federation) Inter |
| 14 | FW | Raúl Campos | 17 December 1987 (aged 28) | | | (Royal Spanish Football Federation) Murcia |

=== Ukraine ===
Head coach: Oleksandr Kosenko

| No. | Pos. | Player | Date of birth (age) | Caps | Goals | Club |
|---|---|---|---|---|---|---|
| 1 | GK | Yevgen Ivanyak | 28 September 1982 (aged 33) | | | (Ukrainian Association of Football) Lokomotiv Kharkiv |
| 2 | FW | Dmytro Sorokin | 14 July 1988 (aged 27) | | | (Ukrainian Association of Football) Lokomotiv Kharkiv |
| 3 | FW | Volodymyr Razuvanov | 1 August 1992 (aged 23) | | | (Russian Football Union) Progress |
| 4 | DF | Dmytro Bondar | 12 October 1983 (aged 32) | | | (Ukrainian Association of Football) Lokomotiv Kharkiv |
| 5 | DF | Yevgen Valenko | 1 November 1984 (aged 31) | | | (Ukrainian Association of Football) Lokomotiv Kharkiv |
| 7 | FW | Yevgen Rogachov | 30 August 1983 (aged 32) | | | (Ukrainian Association of Football) Lokomotiv Kharkiv |
| 8 | DF | Sergiy Koval | 23 August 1986 (aged 29) | | | (Ukrainian Association of Football) Energia Lviv |
| 9 | DF | Mykhailo Grytsyna | 19 October 1991 (aged 24) | | | (Ukrainian Association of Football) Energia Lviv |
| 10 | FW | Serhiy Zhurba | 14 March 1987 (aged 28) | | | (Ukrainian Association of Football) Lokomotiv Kharkiv |
| 11 | FW | Denys Ovsyannikov | 10 December 1984 (aged 31) | | | (Ukrainian Association of Football) Lokomotiv Kharkiv |
| 12 | GK | Dmytro Lytvynenko | 16 April 1987 (aged 28) | | | (Ukrainian Association of Football) Lokomotiv Kharkiv |
| 13 | FW | Oleksandr Sorokin | 13 August 1987 (aged 28) | | | (Ukrainian Association of Football) Lokomotiv Kharkiv |
| 14 | DF | Mykola Grytsyna | 13 June 1989 (aged 26) | | | (Ukrainian Association of Football) Energia Lviv |
| 15 | FW | Olexiy Fetko | 3 January 1988 (aged 28) | | | (Ukrainian Association of Football) Sportleader |

=== Hungary ===
Head coach: Sito Rivera

| No. | Pos. | Player | Date of birth (age) | Caps | Goals | Club |
|---|---|---|---|---|---|---|
| 1 | GK | Csaba Tihanyi | 13 July 1981 (aged 34) | | | (Hungarian Football Federation) Berettyóújfalu |
| 2 | DF | Norbert Öreglaki | 29 August 1991 (aged 24) | | | (Hungarian Football Federation) Haladás |
| 3 | DF | Bence Klacsák | 18 February 1995 (aged 20) | | | (Hungarian Football Federation) Dunaújváros Futsal |
| 4 | FW | Péter Németh | 31 August 1981 (aged 34) | | | (Hungarian Football Federation) Veszpr |
| 5 | DF | Richárd Dávid | 14 August 1990 (aged 25) | | | (Hungarian Football Federation) Berettyóújfalu |
| 6 | DF | János Trencsényi | 2 July 1980 (aged 35) | | | (Hungarian Football Federation) Berettyóújfalu |
| 7 | DF | Norbert Horváth | 5 December 1992 (aged 23) | | | (Hungarian Football Federation) Dunaújváros Futsal |
| 8 | FW | Szabolcs Szeghy | 18 July 1991 (aged 24) | | | (Hungarian Football Federation) Aramis |
| 9 | FW | János Rábl | 15 June 1989 (aged 26) | | | (Hungarian Football Federation) Berettyóújfalu |
| 10 | FW | Ákos Harnisch | 24 August 1987 (aged 28) | | | (Hungarian Football Federation) Győr |
| 11 | FW | Zoltán Dróth | 14 September 1988 (aged 27) | | | (Kazakhstan Football Federation) AFC Kairat |
| 12 | GK | Gyula Tóth | 28 June 1982 (aged 33) | | | (Hungarian Football Federation) Győr |
| 13 | FW | Ádám Hosszú | 20 February 1993 (aged 22) | | | (Hungarian Football Federation) Dunaújváros Futsal |
| 14 | DF | István Gál | 18 May 1986 (aged 29) | | | (Hungarian Football Federation) Berettyóújfalu |

== Group C ==
=== Russia ===
Head coach: Sergei Skorovich

| No. | Pos. | Player | Date of birth (age) | Caps | Goals | Club |
|---|---|---|---|---|---|---|
| 1 | GK | Sergei Vikulov | 25 March 1990 (aged 25) | | | (Russian Football Union) Viz-Sinara |
| 2 | DF | Vladislav Shayakhmetov | 25 August 1981 (aged 34) | | | (Russian Football Union) Gazprom-Ugra |
| 3 | FW | Nikolai Pereverzev | 15 December 1986 (aged 29) | | | (Russian Football Union) Tyumen |
| 4 | FW | Dmitri Lyskov | 24 September 1987 (aged 28) | | | (Russian Football Union) Gazprom-Ugra |
| 5 | DF | Sergei Sergeev | 28 June 1983 (aged 32) | | | (Russian Football Union) Dinamo Moskva |
| 7 | DF | Danil Kutuzov | 13 March 1987 (aged 28) | | | (Russian Football Union) Dina |
| 8 | FW | Eder Lima | 29 June 1984 (aged 31) | | | (Russian Football Union) Gazprom-Ugra |
| 9 | FW | Sergei Abramov | 9 September 1990 (aged 25) | | | (Russian Football Union) Viz-Sinara |
| 10 | FW | Robinho | 28 January 1983 (aged 33) | | | (Russian Football Union) Gazprom-Ugra |
| 12 | GK | Gustavo | 5 February 1979 (aged 36) | | | (Russian Football Union) Dinamo Moskva |
| 14 | DF | Ivan Milovanov | 8 February 1989 (aged 26) | | | (Russian Football Union) Tyumen |
| 15 | DF | Romulo | 28 September 1986 (aged 29) | | | (Russian Football Union) Dinamo Moskva |
| 17 | FW | Renat Shakirov | 4 March 1990 (aged 25) | | | (Russian Football Union) KPRF |
| 18 | DF | Daniil Davydov | 23 January 1989 (aged 27) | | | (Russian Football Union) Gazprom-Ugra |

=== Croatia ===
Head coach: Mato Stanković

| No. | Pos. | Player | Date of birth (age) | Caps | Goals | Club |
|---|---|---|---|---|---|---|
| 1 | GK | Ivo Jukić | 13 April 1986 (aged 29) | | | (Croatian Football Federation) Split Tommy |
| 2 | DF | Vedran Matošević | 27 August 1990 (aged 25) | | | (Croatian Football Federation) Nacional |
| 3 | DF | Jakov Grcić | 12 April 1983 (aged 32) | | | (Croatian Football Federation) Split Tommy |
| 4 | DF | Kristijan Grbeša | 17 January 1990 (aged 26) | | | (Croatian Football Federation) Nacional |
| 6 | FW | Saša Babić | 4 August 1989 (aged 26) | | | (Croatian Football Federation) Novo Vrijeme |
| 7 | DF | Franko Jelovčić | 6 July 1991 (aged 24) | | | (Croatian Football Federation) Split Tommy |
| 8 | FW | Dario Marinović | 24 May 1990 (aged 25) | | | (Royal Spanish Football Federation) ElPozo Murcia |
| 9 | FW | Andrej Pandurević | 5 July 1993 (aged 22) | | | (Croatian Football Federation) Split Tommy |
| 10 | DF | Tihomir Novak | 24 October 1986 (aged 29) | | | (Croatian Football Federation) Nacional |
| 11 | FW | Josip Suton | 14 November 1988 (aged 27) | | | (Croatian Football Federation) Split Tommy |
| 14 | FW | Maro Djuraš | 6 June 1994 (aged 21) | | | (Croatian Football Federation) Murter |
| 15 | FW | Matej Horvat | 30 January 1994 (aged 22) | | | (Croatian Football Federation) Alumnus |
| 17 | DF | Željko Petrović | 7 September 1990 (aged 25) | | | (Croatian Football Federation) Novo Vrijeme |
| 20 | GK | Franko Bilić | 18 August 1988 (aged 27) | | | (Football Association of Serbia) Ekonomac |

=== Kazakhstan ===
Head coach: (Brazil) Kaká

| No. | Pos. | Player | Date of birth (age) | Caps | Goals | Club |
|---|---|---|---|---|---|---|
| 1 | GK | Grigori Shamro | 5 July 1984 (aged 31) | | | (Kazakhstan Football Federation) MFC Inzhu |
| 2 | GK | Leo Higuita | 6 June 1986 (aged 29) | | | (Kazakhstan Football Federation) AFC Kairat |
| 3 | DF | Arnold Knaub | 16 January 1995 (aged 21) | | | (Kazakhstan Football Federation) MFC Astana-Tulpar |
| 4 | DF | Aleksandr Grebonos | 21 May 1987 (aged 28) | | | (Kazakhstan Football Federation) MFC Astana-Tulpar |
| 5 | FW | Serik Zhamankulov | 18 November 1983 (aged 32) | | | (Kazakhstan Football Federation) AFC Kairat |
| 6 | DF | Leo Jaraguá | 21 May 1987 (aged 28) | | | (Kazakhstan Football Federation) AFC Kairat |
| 7 | DF | Nikolai Pengrin | 7 August 1984 (aged 31) | | | (Kazakhstan Football Federation) MFC Astana-Tulpar |
| 8 | DF | Dinmukhambet Suleimenov | 8 January 1981 (aged 35) | | | (Kazakhstan Football Federation) AFC Kairat |
| 9 | FW | Aleksandr Dovgan | 9 February 1988 (aged 27) | | | (Kazakhstan Football Federation) MFC Astana-Tulpar |
| 10 | MF | Chingiz Yesenamanov | 10 March 1989 (aged 26) | | | (Kazakhstan Football Federation) AFC Kairat |
| 11 | MF | Mikhail Pershin | 19 October 1989 (aged 26) | | | (Kazakhstan Football Federation) AFC Kairat |
| 15 | MF | Pavel Taku | 30 August 1988 (aged 27) | | | (Kazakhstan Football Federation) MFC Astana-Tulpar |
| 18 | FW | Douglas Júnior | 15 October 1988 (aged 27) | | | (Kazakhstan Football Federation) AFC Kairat |
| 19 | DF | Dauren Nurgozhin | 21 May 1990 (aged 25) | | | (Kazakhstan Football Federation) AFC Kairat |

== Group D ==
=== Italy ===
Head coach: Roberto Menichelli

| No. | Pos. | Player | Date of birth (age) | Caps | Goals | Club |
|---|---|---|---|---|---|---|
| 1 | GK | Stefano Mammarella | 2 February 1984 (aged 32) | | | (Italian Football Federation) Acqua e Sapone |
| 2 | DF | Marco Ercolessi | 15 May 1986 (aged 29) | | | (Italian Football Federation) Pescara |
| 3 | DF | Gabriel Lima | 19 August 1987 (aged 28) | | | (Italian Football Federation) Asti |
| 4 | DF | Sergio Romano | 28 September 1987 (aged 28) | | | (Italian Football Federation) Cogianco Genzano |
| 5 | DF | Luca Leggiero | 11 November 1984 (aged 31) | | | (Italian Football Federation) Pescara |
| 6 | FW | Humberto Honorio | 21 July 1983 (aged 32) | | | (Italian Football Federation) Luparense |
| 7 | FW | Massimo De Luca | 7 October 1987 (aged 28) | | | (Italian Football Federation) Real Rieti |
| 8 | FW | Alessandro Patias | 8 July 1985 (aged 30) | | | (Portuguese Football Federation) Benfica |
| 9 | FW | Rodolfo Fortino | 30 April 1983 (aged 32) | | | (Portuguese Football Federation) Sporting CP |
| 10 | DF | Alex Merlim | 15 July 1986 (aged 29) | | | (Portuguese Football Federation) Sporting CP |
| 11 | FW | Mauro Canal | 25 June 1986 (aged 29) | | | (Italian Football Federation) Pescara |
| 12 | GK | Michele Miarelli | 29 April 1984 (aged 31) | | | (Italian Football Federation) Luparense |
| 13 | DF | Daniel Giasson | 24 August 1987 (aged 28) | | | (Italian Football Federation) Luparense |
| 15 | DF | Murilo Ferreira | 10 March 1989 (aged 26) | | | (Italian Football Federation) Acqua e Sapone |

=== Czech Republic ===
Head coach: Tomáš Neumann

| No. | Pos. | Player | Date of birth (age) | Caps | Goals | Club |
|---|---|---|---|---|---|---|
| 2 | DF | David Cupák | 27 May 1989 (aged 26) | | | (Football Association of the Czech Republic) FC Zbrojovka Brno |
| 3 | DF | Jiří Novotný | 12 July 1988 (aged 27) | | | (Football Association of the Czech Republic) Slavia Praha |
| 4 | FW | Radim Záruba | 28 December 1994 (aged 21) | | | (Football Association of the Czech Republic) Chrudim |
| 5 | DF | Vítězslav Hrubý | 4 May 1994 (aged 21) | | | (Football Association of the Czech Republic) Nejzbach |
| 6 | FW | Tomáš Koudelka | 17 December 1990 (aged 25) | | | (Football Association of the Czech Republic) Chrudim |
| 7 | FW | Lukáš Rešetár | 28 April 1984 (aged 31) | | | (Football Association of the Czech Republic) Era-Pack Chrudim |
| 8 | FW | Matěj Slováček | 8 October 1990 (aged 25) | | | (Football Association of the Czech Republic) Chrudim |
| 9 | DF | Michal Holý | 29 May 1990 (aged 25) | | | (Football Association of the Czech Republic) Teplice |
| 10 | FW | Michal Seidler | 5 April 1990 (aged 25) | | | (Hungarian Football Federation) Győr |
| 11 | FW | Marcel Rodek | 7 November 1988 (aged 27) | | | (Football Association of the Czech Republic) Benago |
| 12 | GK | Libor Gerčák | 22 July 1975 (aged 40) | | | (Football Association of the Czech Republic) Chrudim |
| 13 | DF | Michal Kovács | 17 April 1990 (aged 25) | | | (Football Association of the Czech Republic) Chrudim |
| 14 | DF | Jan Janovský | 20 June 1985 (aged 30) | | | (Polish Football Association) Bielsko-Biała |
| 16 | GK | Ondřej Vahala | 25 May 1990 (aged 25) | | | (Football Association of the Czech Republic) Slavia Praha |

=== Azerbaijan ===
Head coach: Tino Pérez

| No. | Pos. | Player | Date of birth (age) | Caps | Goals | Club |
|---|---|---|---|---|---|---|
| 2 | FW | Samir Hamazayev | 1 August 1989 (aged 26) | | | (Association of Football Federations of Azerbaijan) Araz Naxçivan |
| 3 | DF | Zeynal Zeynalov | 6 December 1979 (aged 36) | | | (Association of Football Federations of Azerbaijan) Kapaz Ganja |
| 4 | FW | Ramiz Chovdarov | 28 July 1990 (aged 25) | | | (Association of Football Federations of Azerbaijan) Araz |
| 5 | FW | Fineo De Araujo | 10 April 1987 (aged 28) | | | (Association of Football Federations of Azerbaijan) Araz |
| 6 | DF | Eduardo | 14 October 1986 (aged 29) | | | (Association of Football Federations of Azerbaijan) Araz Naxçivan |
| 8 | DF | Rizvan Farzaliyev | 1 September 1979 (aged 36) | | | (Association of Football Federations of Azerbaijan) Araz |
| 9 | FW | Augusto | 25 February 1980 (aged 35) | | | (Association of Football Federations of Azerbaijan) Araz |
| 10 | FW | Amadeu | 6 March 1990 (aged 25) | | | (Association of Football Federations of Azerbaijan) Araz |
| 12 | GK | Rovshan Huseynli | 3 April 1991 (aged 24) | | | (Association of Football Federations of Azerbaijan) Araz |
| 14 | FW | Vitaliy Borisov | 5 July 1982 (aged 33) | | | (Association of Football Federations of Azerbaijan) Araz |
| 15 | DF | Rafael | 26 December 1982 (aged 33) | | | (Association of Football Federations of Azerbaijan) Araz Naxçivan |
| 16 | FW | Khatai Baghirov | 15 August 1987 (aged 28) | | | (Association of Football Federations of Azerbaijan) Araz |
| 18 | FW | Sergey Chuykov | 4 September 1980 (aged 35) | | | (Russian Football Union) Progress |
| 19 | GK | Elnur Zamanov | 17 May 1981 (aged 34) | | | (Association of Football Federations of Azerbaijan) Neftchi Baku |
