= UEFA Futsal Euro 2022 squads =

List of the national futsal squads that take part in the UEFA Futsal Euro 2022

The UEFA Futsal Euro 2022 is an international futsal tournament to be held in the Netherlands from January 19 to February 6, 2022. The 16 national teams involved in the tournament were required by UEFA to register a squad of 14 players, including two goalkeepers. Each team is allowed to replace a maximum of one outfield player if he is injured or ill severely enough to prevent his participation in the tournament. Each team is also allowed to temporarily replace a goalkeeper if there are fewer than two healthy goalkeepers.

This article lists the national futsal squads that take part in the tournament. The age listed for each player is as of January 19, 2022, the first day of the tournament.

== Group A ==
=== Netherlands ===
Head coach: Maximiliaan Tjaden

| No. | Pos. | Player | Date of birth (age) | Club |
|---|---|---|---|---|
| 1 | GK | Manuel Kuijk | 13 October 1994 (aged 27) | (Royal Dutch Football Association) FC Eindhoven |
| 12 | GK | Barry De Wit | 16 December 1994 (aged 27) | (Royal Dutch Football Association) FC Marlène |
| 2 | DF | Oualid Saadouni (captain) | 12 March 1988 (aged 33) | (Royal Dutch Football Association) FC Eindhoven |
| 3 | DF | Jamal El Ghannouti | 29 March 1983 (aged 38) | (Royal Dutch Football Association) ASV Lebo |
| 4 | DF | Tevfik Ceyar | 2 May 1990 (aged 31) | (Royal Dutch Football Association) FCK De Hommel |
| 9 | DF | Mats Velseboer | 13 September 1993 (aged 28) | (Royal Dutch Football Association) Hovocubo |
| 11 | DF | Lahcen Bouyouzan | 17 April 1993 (aged 28) | (Royal Dutch Football Association) Hovocubo |
| 15 | DF | Dennis Van Den Eijnden | 1 January 1997 (aged 25) | (Royal Dutch Football Association) FC Eindhoven |
| 5 | FW | Said Bouzambou | 9 February 1990 (aged 31) | (Royal Dutch Football Association) FC Eindhoven |
| 6 | FW | Karim Mossaoui | 27 February 1988 (aged 33) | (Royal Dutch Football Association) Hovocubo |
| 7 | FW | Yoshua St. Juste | 23 February 1991 (aged 30) | (Royal Dutch Football Association) Hovocubo |
| 10 | FW | Mohamed Attaibi | 23 October 1987 (aged 34) | (Royal Dutch Football Association) FC Marlène |
| 14 | FW | Jordany Martinus | 10 July 1990 (aged 31) | (Royal Dutch Football Association) FC Eindhoven |
| 18 | FW | Amir Molkârâi | 15 May 1987 (aged 34) | (Royal Dutch Football Association) FC Marlène |

=== Serbia ===
Head coach: Dejan Majes

| No. | Pos. | Player | Date of birth (age) | Club |
|---|---|---|---|---|
| 1 | GK | Nemanja Momčilović | 15 April 1991 (aged 30) | (French Football Federation) Mouvaux Lille Futsal |
| 12 | GK | Jakov Vulić | 10 March 1992 (aged 29) | (Football Association of Serbia) KMF FON |
| 4 | DF | Nikola Matijević | 26 December 1991 (aged 30) | (Football Association of Serbia) KMF Loznica-Grad |
| 5 | DF | Kristijan Vasic | 24 June 1999 (aged 22) | (Football Association of Serbia) KMF Ekonomac |
| 9 | DF | Jovan Lazarević | 11 September 1997 (aged 23) | (Russian Football Union) MFK Tyumen |
| 6 | DF | Denis Ramić | 17 November 1994 (aged 27) | (Football Association of Serbia) KMF FON |
| 11 | DF | Stefan Rakić | 22 November 1993 (aged 28) | (Polish Football Association) Rekord Bielsko-Biała |
| 2 | FW | Ninoslav Aleksić | 3 February 1995 (aged 26) | (Hungarian Football Federation) SG Kecskemét |
| 3 | FW | Mladen Kocić | 22 October 1988 (aged 33) | (Football Association of Serbia) KMF Loznica-Grad |
| 7 | FW | Dragan Tomić | 25 March 1991 (aged 30) | (Royal Belgian Football Association) FP Halle-Gooik |
| 8 | FW | Marko Pršić (captain) | 13 September 1990 (aged 31) | (Kuwait Football Association) Al-Arabi |
| 10 | FW | Strahinja Petrov | 14 December 1993 (aged 28) | (Italian Football Federation) Real San Giuseppe |
| 14 | FW | Slobodan Rajčević | 28 February 1985 (aged 36) | (Football Association of Serbia) KMF FON |
| 15 | FW | Lazar Milosavljević | 20 October 1998 (aged 23) | (Football Association of Serbia) KMF FON |
| 19 | FW | Andreja Stojcevski | 6 August 1998 (aged 23) | (Football Association of Serbia) KMF Ekonomac |

=== Ukraine ===
Head coach: Oleksandr Kosenko

| No. | Pos. | Player | Date of birth (age) | Club |
|---|---|---|---|---|
| 1 | GK | Kyrylo Tsypun | 30 July 1987 (aged 34) | (Ukrainian Association of Football) MFC Prodexim Kherson |
| 12 | GK | Yuriy Savenko | 21 January 1992 (aged 29) | (Ukrainian Association of Football) MFC Prodexim Kherson |
| 2 | DF | Vitaliy Radevych | 13 November 1997 (aged 24) | (Ukrainian Association of Football) Uragan Ivano-Frankivsk |
| 7 | DF | Yevhen Siriy | 8 August 1992 (aged 29) | (Ukrainian Association of Football) MFC HIT Kyiv |
| 13 | DF | Ihor Korsun | 15 June 1993 (aged 28) | (Ukrainian Association of Football) MFC Prodexim Kherson |
| 14 | DF | Petro Shoturma (captain) | 27 June 1992 (aged 29) | (Ukrainian Association of Football) MFC Prodexim Kherson |
| 19 | DF | Mykhailo Zvarych | 23 November 1992 (aged 29) | (Ukrainian Association of Football) MFC Prodexim Kherson |
| 4 | FW | Volodymyr Razuvanov | 1 August 1992 (aged 29) | (Russian Football Union) MFK Dinamo Samara |
| 5 | FW | Yaroslav Lebid | 26 May 1995 (aged 26) | (Ukrainian Association of Football) MFC HIT Kyiv |
| 8 | FW | Ihor Cherniavskiy | 14 September 1995 (aged 26) | (Ukrainian Association of Football) MFC HIT Kyiv |
| 9 | FW | Danyil Abakshyn | 22 December 1997 (aged 24) | (Ukrainian Association of Football) Uragan Ivano-Frankivsk |
| 10 | FW | Serhiy Zhurba | 14 March 1987 (aged 34) | (Ukrainian Association of Football) MFC HIT Kyiv |
| 11 | FW | Artem Fareniuk | 9 November 1992 (aged 29) | (Ukrainian Association of Football) Uragan Ivano-Frankivsk |
| 17 | FW | Oleksandr Pediash | 4 March 1994 (aged 27) | (Ukrainian Association of Football) MFC HIT Kyiv |

=== Portugal ===
Head coach: Jorge Braz
After the team's first group stage match, goalkeeper Bebé withdrew injured and was replaced by Edu on 22 January.

| No. | Pos. | Player | Date of birth (age) | Club |
|---|---|---|---|---|
| 1 | GK | André Sousa | 25 February 1986 (aged 35) | (Portuguese Football Federation) Benfica |
| 12 | GK | Bebé (until 22 January) | 19 May 1983 (aged 38) | (Portuguese Football Federation) Leões Porto Salvo |
| 12 | GK | Edu (from 22 January) | 19 August 1996 (aged 25) | (Royal Spanish Football Federation) Viña Albali Valdepeñas |
| 2 | DF | André Coelho | 30 October 1993 (aged 28) | (Royal Spanish Football Federation) FC Barcelona |
| 3 | DF | Tomás Paçó | 19 April 2000 (aged 21) | (Portuguese Football Federation) Sporting CP |
| 4 | DF | Afonso Jesus | 6 January 1998 (aged 24) | (Portuguese Football Federation) Benfica |
| 5 | DF | Fábio Cecílio | 30 April 1993 (aged 28) | (Portuguese Football Federation) SC Braga/AAUM |
| 8 | DF | Erick Mendonça | 21 July 1995 (aged 26) | (Portuguese Football Federation) Sporting CP |
| 9 | DF | João Matos (captain) | 21 February 1987 (aged 34) | (Portuguese Football Federation) Sporting CP |
| 10 | DF | Bruno Coelho | 1 August 1987 (aged 34) | (Italian Football Federation) Napoli Futsal |
| 6 | FW | Zicky Té | 1 September 2001 (aged 20) | (Portuguese Football Federation) Sporting CP |
| 7 | FW | Miguel Ângelo | 2 February 1994 (aged 27) | (Portuguese Football Federation) Sporting CP |
| 11 | FW | Pany Varela | 25 February 1989 (aged 32) | (Portuguese Football Federation) Sporting CP |
| 13 | FW | Tiago Brito | 22 July 1991 (aged 30) | (Portuguese Football Federation) SC Braga/AAUM |
| 14 | FW | Pauleta | 12 June 1994 (aged 27) | (Portuguese Football Federation) Sporting CP |

== Group B ==
=== Kazakhstan ===
Head coach: (Brazil) Paulo Ricardo Kakà

| No. | Pos. | Player | Date of birth (age) | Club |
|---|---|---|---|---|
| 1 | GK | Rauan Atantayev | 22 September 1990 (aged 31) | (Kazakhstan Football Federation) FC Nur-Sultan |
| 2 | GK | Higuita (captain) | 6 June 1986 (aged 35) | (Kazakhstan Football Federation) AFC Kairat |
| 11 | DF | Arnold Knaub | 16 January 1995 (aged 27) | (Russian Football Union) MFK Dinamo Samara |
| 14 | DF | Douglas Júnior | 15 October 1988 (aged 33) | (Kazakhstan Football Federation) AFC Kairat |
| 17 | DF | Birzhan Orazov | 17 October 1994 (aged 27) | (Kazakhstan Football Federation) AFC Kairat |
| 3 | FW | Taynan da Silva | 12 February 1993 (aged 28) | (Royal Spanish Football Federation) ElPozo Murcia FS |
| 4 | FW | Nurbek Karagulov | 14 October 1992 (aged 29) | (Kazakhstan Football Federation) FC Aktobe |
| 5 | FW | Edson Gomes | 7 May 1992 (aged 29) | (Kazakhstan Football Federation) AFC Kairat |
| 7 | FW | Azat Valiullin | 5 May 1992 (aged 29) | (Kazakhstan Football Federation) MFC Ayat |
| 9 | FW | Albert Akbalikov | 5 January 1995 (aged 27) | (Kazakhstan Football Federation) AFC Kairat |
| 10 | FW | Chingiz Yesenamanov | 10 March 1989 (aged 32) | (Kazakhstan Football Federation) AFC Kairat |
| 12 | FW | Dauren Tursagulov | 16 January 1996 (aged 26) | (Kazakhstan Football Federation) AFC Kairat |
| 13 | FW | Zhomart Tokayev | 10 December 1999 (aged 22) | (Kazakhstan Football Federation) FC Atyrau |
| 15 | FW | Yersultan Sagyndykov | 28 April 1995 (aged 26) | (Kazakhstan Football Federation) FC Atyrau |

=== Italy ===
Head coach: Massimiliano Bellarte
Before the team's second group stage match Stefano Mammarella was replaced by Lorenzo Pietrangelo due to testing positive for coronavirus and Gabriel Motta was replaced by Julio De Oliveira due to an injury.

| No. | Pos. | Player | Date of birth (age) | Club |
|---|---|---|---|---|
| 1 | GK | Stefano Mammarella (until 24 January) | 2 February 1984 (aged 37) | (Italian Football Federation) Futsal Pescara |
| 12 | GK | Dennis Berthod | 31 July 2003 (aged 18) | (Italian Football Federation) Aosta Calcio 511 |
| 19 | GK | Lorenzo Pietrangelo (from 24 January) | 24 June 1995 (aged 26) | (Italian Football Federation) Came Dosson |
| 14 | DF | Eduardo Alano | 8 July 1996 (aged 25) | (French Football Federation) Mouvaux Lille Futsal |
| 2 | FW | Douglas Nicolodi | 9 June 1988 (aged 33) | (Italian Football Federation) Olimpus Roma |
| 3 | FW | Matteo Esposito | 24 September 1994 (aged 27) | (Italian Football Federation) Todis Lido di Ostia |
| 4 | FW | Vincenzo Caponigro | 18 August 1997 (aged 24) | (Italian Football Federation) Feldi Eboli |
| 5 | FW | Giuliano Fortini | 8 September 1996 (aged 25) | (Italian Football Federation) Italservice Pesaro |
| 6 | FW | Carmelo Musumeci | 17 December 1991 (aged 30) | (Italian Football Federation) Meta Catania |
| 7 | FW | Cainan De Matos | 27 January 1990 (aged 31) | (Royal Spanish Football Federation) Palma Futsal |
| 9 | FW | Attilio Arillo | 29 December 1994 (aged 27) | (Italian Football Federation) Napoli Futsal |
| 10 | FW | Alex Merlim (captain) | 15 July 1986 (aged 35) | (Portuguese Football Federation) Sporting CP |
| 11 | FW | Guilherme Gaio | 4 November 1991 (aged 30) | (Italian Football Federation) Futsal Pescara |
| 15 | FW | Gabriel Motta (until 24 January) | 16 August 1999 (aged 22) | (Royal Spanish Football Federation) Jimbee Cartagena |
| 18 | FW | Julio De Oliveira (from 24 January) | 8 June 1991 (aged 30) | (Italian Football Federation) Italservice Pesaro |
| 20 | FW | Guilherme Stringari | 24 September 1995 (aged 26) | (Kuwait Football Association) Kuwait SC |

=== Slovenia ===
Head coach: Tomislav Horvat
After the team's first group stage match, Gašper Vrhovec withdrew injured and was replaced by Kristjan Čujec on 22 January.

| No. | Pos. | Player | Date of birth (age) | Club |
|---|---|---|---|---|
| 1 | GK | Tjaž Lovrenčič | 17 January 1996 (aged 26) | (Football Association of Slovenia) Meteorplast Šic Bar |
| 12 | GK | Nejc Berzelak | 3 May 1998 (aged 23) | (Football Association of Slovenia) FC Litija |
| 3 | DF | Nejc Kovačič | 18 December 1998 (aged 23) | (Football Association of Slovenia) KMN Oplast Kobarid |
| 4 | DF | Maks Vesel | 11 May 2001 (aged 20) | (Football Association of Slovenia) FK Siliko |
| 7 | DF | Igor Osredkar (captain) | 28 June 1986 (aged 35) | (Football Association of Slovenia) FC Litija |
| 8 | DF | Nejc Hozjan | 31 July 1996 (aged 25) | (Italian Football Federation) Napoli Futsal |
| 10 | DF | Alen Fetić | 14 October 1991 (aged 30) | (Italian Football Federation) Syn-Bios Petrarca |
| 11 | DF | Klemen Duščak | 5 November 1994 (aged 27) | (Football Association of Slovenia) FK Dobovec |
| 13 | DF | Žiga Čeh | 25 January 1995 (aged 26) | (Football Association of Slovenia) FK Dobovec |
| 2 | FW | Teo Turk | 15 March 1996 (aged 25) | (Football Association of Slovenia) FK Dobovec |
| 5 | FW | Jeremy Bukovec | 7 October 2000 (aged 21) | (Football Association of Slovenia) FC Hiša Daril Ptuj |
| 6 | FW | Denis Totošković | 18 November 1987 (aged 34) | (Italian Football Federation) Sampdoria Futsal |
| 9 | FW | Gašper Vrhovec (until 22 January) | 18 July 1988 (aged 33) | (Football Association of Slovenia) FC Litija |
| 14 | FW | Matej Fideršek | 4 July 1991 (aged 30) | (Italian Football Federation) Sampdoria Futsal |
| 20 | FW | Kristjan Čujec (from 22 January) | 30 November 1988 (aged 33) | (Football Association of Slovenia) FK Dobovec |

=== Finland ===
Head coach: (Croatia) Mico Martić

| No. | Pos. | Player | Date of birth (age) | Club |
|---|---|---|---|---|
| 1 | GK | Juha-Matti Savolainen | 26 May 1991 (aged 30) | (Football Association of Finland) Kampuksen Dynamo |
| 12 | GK | Antti Koivumäki | 27 January 1993 (aged 28) | (Football Association of Finland) Golden Futsal Team |
| 2 | DF | Panu Autio (captain) | 4 August 1985 (aged 36) | (Football Association of Finland) Golden Futsal Team |
| 6 | DF | Jukka Kytölä | 27 December 1988 (aged 33) | (Football Association of Finland) Kampuksen Dynamo |
| 13 | DF | Jani Korpela | 8 July 1997 (aged 24) | (Russian Football Union) MFK Torpedo |
| 4 | FW | Tuukka Pikkarainen | 7 January 1998 (aged 24) | (Football Association of Finland) FC Kemi |
| 5 | FW | Juhana Jyrkiäinen | 4 April 1990 (aged 31) | (Football Association of Finland) Akaa Futsal |
| 7 | FW | Jarmo Junno | 12 May 1992 (aged 29) | (Football Association of Finland) Vieska Futsal |
| 8 | FW | Sergei Korsunov | 22 February 1992 (aged 29) | (Football Association of Finland) Kampuksen Dynamo |
| 10 | FW | Miika Hosio | 27 June 1989 (aged 32) | (Football Association of Finland) Golden Futsal Team |
| 11 | FW | Lassi Lintula | 25 June 1997 (aged 24) | (Football Association of Finland) Kampuksen Dynamo |
| 15 | FW | Olli Pöyliö | 11 August 1995 (aged 26) | (Football Association of Finland) Liikunnan Riemu |
| 16 | FW | Henri Alamikkotervo | 6 January 2001 (aged 21) | (Football Association of Finland) Golden Futsal Team |
| 19 | FW | Iiro Vanha | 19 December 1994 (aged 27) | (Football Association of Finland) Akaa Futsal |

== Group C ==
=== Russia ===
Head coach: Sergei Skorovich
Before the team's second group stage match, Éder Lima withdrew injured and was replaced by Andrei Afanasyev.

| No. | Pos. | Player | Date of birth (age) | Club |
|---|---|---|---|---|
| 1 | GK | Georgi Zamtaradze | 12 February 1987 (aged 34) | (Russian Football Union) MFK KPRF |
| 16 | GK | Dmitri Putilov | 5 December 1994 (aged 27) | (Russian Football Union) MFK Sinara Yekaterinburg |
| 4 | DF | Artem Antoshkin | 17 December 1993 (aged 28) | (Russian Football Union) MFK Tyumen |
| 7 | DF | Ivan Milovanov | 8 February 1989 (aged 32) | (Russian Football Union) MFK Tyumen |
| 12 | DF | Ivan Chishkala | 11 July 1995 (aged 26) | (Portuguese Football Federation) Benfica |
| 20 | DF | Nando | 31 October 1987 (aged 34) | (Russian Football Union) MFK Dinamo Samara |
| 8 | FW | Éder Lima (until 25 January) | 29 June 1984 (aged 37) | (Brazilian Football Confederation) Corinthians |
| 9 | FW | Sergei Abramov (captain) | 9 September 1990 (aged 31) | (Russian Football Union) MFK Sinara Yekaterinburg |
| 10 | FW | Robinho | 28 January 1983 (aged 38) | (Portuguese Football Federation) Benfica |
| 11 | FW | Artem Niyazov | 30 July 1996 (aged 25) | (Russian Football Union) MFK KPRF |
| 13 | FW | Sergei Abramovich | 15 January 1990 (aged 32) | (Russian Football Union) MFK Tyumen |
| 14 | FW | Daniil Davydov | 23 January 1989 (aged 32) | (Russian Football Union) MFK Gazprom-Ugra Yugorsk |
| 17 | FW | Anton Sokolov | 28 February 1999 (aged 22) | (Russian Football Union) MFK Sinara Yekaterinburg |
| 18 | FW | Andrei Afanasyev (from 25 January) | 23 May 1986 (aged 35) | (Russian Football Union) MFK Gazprom-Ugra Yugorsk |
| 19 | FW | Paulinho | 19 October 1985 (aged 36) | (Russian Football Union) MFK KPRF |

=== Poland ===
Head coach: Błażej Korczyński

| No. | Pos. | Player | Date of birth (age) | Club |
|---|---|---|---|---|
| 1 | GK | Michał Kałuża | 22 July 1998 (aged 23) | (Royal Spanish Football Federation) CD Burela FS |
| 12 | GK | Bartłomiej Nawrat | 15 July 1984 (aged 37) | (Polish Football Association) Rekord Bielsko-Biała |
| 2 | DF | Michał Kubik (captain) | 7 May 1990 (aged 31) | (Polish Football Association) Rekord Bielsko-Biała |
| 6 | DF | Sebastian Grubalski | 1 November 1999 (aged 22) | (Polish Football Association) Constract Lubawa |
| 8 | DF | Dominik Solecki | 17 July 1990 (aged 31) | (Polish Football Association) GI Malepszy Futsal Leszno |
| 9 | DF | Tomasz Lutecki | 1 September 1991 (aged 30) | (Polish Football Association) Dreman Opole Komprachcice |
| 13 | DF | Tomasz Kriezel | 5 November 1993 (aged 28) | (Polish Football Association) Constract Lubawa |
| 3 | FW | Mateusz Madziąg | 17 November 1996 (aged 25) | (Polish Football Association) Constract Lubawa |
| 4 | FW | Patryk Hoły | 20 May 1994 (aged 27) | (Polish Football Association) Red Dragons Pniewy |
| 5 | FW | Dominik Śmiałkowski | 27 October 1991 (aged 30) | (Polish Football Association) Piast Gliwice |
| 7 | FW | Mikołaj Zastawnik | 2 September 1996 (aged 25) | (Polish Football Association) Rekord Bielsko-Biała |
| 10 | FW | Sebastian Leszczak | 20 January 1992 (aged 29) | (Polish Football Association) Rekord Bielsko-Biała |
| 14 | FW | Michał Marek | 4 July 1993 (aged 28) | (Polish Football Association) Rekord Bielsko-Biała |
| 15 | FW | Sebastian Wojciechowski | 17 January 1988 (aged 34) | (Polish Football Association) GI Malepszy Futsal Leszno |

=== Slovakia ===
Head coach: Marián Berky

| No. | Pos. | Player | Date of birth (age) | Club |
|---|---|---|---|---|
| 2 | GK | Marek Karpiak | 28 December 1997 (aged 24) | (Football Association of the Czech Republic) SK Slavia Praha |
| 12 | GK | Richard Oberman | 7 July 1994 (aged 27) | (Slovak Football Association) Podpor Pohyb Košice |
| 5 | DF | Gabriel Rick | 17 November 1988 (aged 33) | (Football Association of the Czech Republic) SK Interobal Plzeň |
| 7 | DF | Martin Směřička | 25 August 1994 (aged 27) | (Slovak Football Association) MIMEL Lučenec |
| 9 | DF | Peter Kozár (captain) | 17 November 1986 (aged 35) | (Football Association of the Czech Republic) SK Interobal Plzeň |
| 10 | DF | Martin Doša | 18 July 1992 (aged 29) | (Football Association of the Czech Republic) FK Chrudim |
| 13 | DF | Anton Brunovský | 3 September 1989 (aged 32) | (Slovak Football Association) MIMEL Lučenec |
| 16 | DF | Tomáš Drahovský | 7 October 1992 (aged 29) | (Royal Spanish Football Federation) Industrias Santa Coloma |
| 4 | FW | Peter Serbin | 16 February 1989 (aged 32) | (Slovak Football Association) MIMEL Lučenec |
| 6 | FW | Matúš Ševčík | 23 May 2000 (aged 21) | (Football Association of the Czech Republic) SK Slavia Praha |
| 8 | FW | Martin Zdráhal | 12 March 1993 (aged 28) | (Football Association of the Czech Republic) SK Interobal Plzeň |
| 11 | FW | Patrik Zaťovič | 9 July 1993 (aged 28) | (Polish Football Association) Piast Gliwice |
| 14 | FW | Daniel Čeřovský | 19 February 1998 (aged 23) | (Slovak Football Association) MIMEL Lučenec |
| 15 | FW | Vojtech Turek | 12 March 1997 (aged 24) | (Italian Football Federation) Or.Sa Bernalda Futsal |
| 17 | FW | Dominik Ostrák | 16 April 1997 (aged 24) | (Slovak Football Association) MIMEL Lučenec |

=== Croatia ===
Head coach: Marinko Mavrović
After the team's second group stage match, Josip Suton withdrew injured and was replaced by Duje Kustura on 29 January.

| No. | Pos. | Player | Date of birth (age) | Club |
|---|---|---|---|---|
| 1 | GK | Žarko Luketin | 16 March 1989 (aged 32) | (Croatian Football Federation) Futsal Pula Stanoinvest |
| 20 | GK | Zoran Primić | 21 April 1991 (aged 30) | (Croatian Football Federation) HMNK Vrgorac |
| 2 | DF | Vedran Matošević | 27 August 1990 (aged 31) | (Football Association of Slovenia) FK Dobovec |
| 4 | DF | Davor Kanjuh | 20 July 1989 (aged 32) | (Croatian Football Federation) Futsal Dinamo |
| 5 | DF | Duje Kustura (from 29 January) | 2 July 1998 (aged 23) | (Croatian Football Federation) MNK Olmissum |
| 17 | DF | Kristian Čekol | 30 December 1997 (aged 24) | (Croatian Football Federation) Futsal Dinamo |
| 18 | DF | Matej Horvat | 30 January 1994 (aged 27) | (Croatian Football Federation) MNK Olmissum |
| 6 | FW | Maro Đuraš | 6 June 1994 (aged 27) | (Croatian Football Federation) MNK Square Dubrovnik |
| 7 | FW | Franco Jelovčić (captain) | 6 July 1991 (aged 30) | (Royal Belgian Football Association) FP Halle-Gooik |
| 8 | FW | Dario Marinović | 24 May 1990 (aged 31) | (Royal Spanish Football Federation) Jimbee Cartagena |
| 10 | FW | Tihomir Novak | 24 October 1986 (aged 35) | (Football Association of Slovenia) FK Dobovec |
| 11 | FW | Josip Suton (until 29 January) | 14 November 1988 (aged 33) | (Italian Football Federation) Came Dosson |
| 13 | FW | Josip Jurlina | 13 January 2000 (aged 22) | (Croatian Football Federation) MNK Olmissum |
| 14 | FW | Kristijan Postružin | 28 August 1995 (aged 26) | (Croatian Football Federation) MNK Olmissum |
| 19 | FW | Antonio Sekulić | 22 January 1999 (aged 22) | (Croatian Football Federation) MNK Olmissum |

== Group D ==
=== Georgia ===
Head coach: Avtandil Asatiani

| No. | Pos. | Player | Date of birth (age) | Club |
|---|---|---|---|---|
| 1 | GK | Zviad Kupatadze (captain) | 30 October 1979 (aged 42) | (Russian Football Union) Gazprom-Ugra Yugorsk |
| 12 | GK | Tornike Bukia | 15 May 1994 (aged 27) | (Football Association of Finland) FC Kemi |
| 6 | DF | Vilian Lourenço | 11 June 1989 (aged 32) | (Russian Football Union) Gazprom-Ugra Yugorsk |
| 7 | DF | Shota Tophuria | 14 May 1990 (aged 31) | (Georgian Football Federation) Telasi-Georgians |
| 10 | DF | Roninho | 4 April 1987 (aged 34) | (Royal Belgian Football Association) FP Halle-Gooik |
| 16 | DF | Thales Feitosa | 13 April 1988 (aged 33) | (Portuguese Football Federation) CR Candoso |
| 17 | DF | Archil Sebiskveradze | 14 August 1989 (aged 32) | (Football Federation of Belarus) BCH Gomel |
| 2 | FW | Chaguinha | 25 July 1988 (aged 33) | (Royal Spanish Football Federation) Palma Futsal |
| 5 | FW | Giorgi Ghavtadze | 30 October 2000 (aged 21) | (Russian Football Union) PMFK Sibiryak |
| 8 | FW | Vakhtang Kekelia | 10 September 1989 (aged 32) | (Tajikistan Football Federation) FC Sipar |
| 9 | FW | Irakli Todua | 7 September 1990 (aged 31) | (Georgian Football Federation) Telasi-Georgians |
| 18 | FW | Nikoloz Kurtanidze | 1 March 1993 (aged 28) | (Georgian Football Federation) PSP |
| 19 | FW | Elisandro Gomes | 11 December 1986 (aged 35) | (Portuguese Football Federation) SC Braga/AAUM |
| 20 | FW | Bruno Petry Branco | 22 March 1989 (aged 32) | (Royal Spanish Football Federation) Jaén Paraíso Interior |

=== Spain ===
Head coach: Federico Vidal
Adolfo Fernández didn't take part in the games against Bosnia and Herzegovina and Azerbaijan due to being tested positive on COVID-19.
Before the team's third group stage match, Esteban Cejudo withdrew injured and was replaced by Francisco Solano on 27 January.

| No. | Pos. | Player | Date of birth (age) | Club |
|---|---|---|---|---|
| 1 | GK | Jesús Herrero | 4 November 1986 (aged 35) | (Royal Spanish Football Federation) Inter FS |
| 12 | GK | Dídac Plana | 25 May 1990 (aged 31) | (Royal Spanish Football Federation) FC Barcelona |
| 2 | DF | Carlos Ortiz (captain) | 3 October 1983 (aged 38) | (Royal Spanish Football Federation) FC Barcelona |
| 5 | DF | Boyis | 26 December 1989 (aged 32) | (Royal Spanish Football Federation) Inter FS |
| 9 | DF | Sergio Lozano | 9 November 1988 (aged 33) | (Royal Spanish Football Federation) FC Barcelona |
| 13 | DF | Miguel Mellado | 23 July 1999 (aged 22) | (Royal Spanish Football Federation) Jimbee Cartagena |
| 3 | FW | Borja Díaz | 19 September 1992 (aged 29) | (Royal Spanish Football Federation) Inter FS |
| 4 | FW | Esteban Guerrero (until 27 January) | 18 February 1995 (aged 26) | (Russian Football Union) MFK KPRF |
| 6 | FW | Raúl Gómez | 25 October 1995 (aged 26) | (Royal Spanish Football Federation) Inter FS |
| 7 | FW | Catela | 14 April 1995 (aged 26) | (Royal Spanish Football Federation) Viña Albali Valdepeñas |
| 8 | FW | Adolfo Fernández | 19 May 1993 (aged 28) | (Royal Spanish Football Federation) FC Barcelona |
| 10 | FW | Cecilio Morales | 6 July 1992 (aged 29) | (Royal Spanish Football Federation) Inter FS |
| 11 | FW | Chino | 13 November 1991 (aged 30) | (Royal Spanish Football Federation) Viña Albali Valdepeñas |
| 14 | FW | Raúl Campos | 17 December 1987 (aged 34) | (Royal Spanish Football Federation) Manzanares FS |
| 16 | FW | Francisco Solano (from 27 January) | 26 August 1991 (aged 30) | (Royal Spanish Football Federation) Jimbee Cartagena |

=== Azerbaijan ===
Head coach: (Brazil) José Alesio da Silva

| No. | Pos. | Player | Date of birth (age) | Club |
|---|---|---|---|---|
| 1 | GK | Emin Kurdov | 10 July 1984 (aged 37) | (Association of Football Federations of Azerbaijan) EKOL Baku |
| 12 | GK | Rovshan Huseynli | 3 April 1991 (aged 30) | (Association of Football Federations of Azerbaijan) Araz Naxçivan |
| 6 | DF | Eduardo Borges | 14 October 1986 (aged 35) | (Royal Belgian Football Association) FP Halle-Gooik |
| 8 | DF | Rizvan Farzaliyev (captain) | 1 September 1979 (aged 42) | (Association of Football Federations of Azerbaijan) Araz Naxçivan |
| 10 | DF | Vassoura | 26 April 1985 (aged 36) | (French Football Federation) Sporting Paris |
| 13 | DF | Gallo | 4 December 1987 (aged 34) | (Royal Spanish Football Federation) Levante UD |
| 14 | DF | Hadi Ahmadi | 26 February 1994 (aged 27) | (Kazakhstan Football Federation) Baiterek |
| 2 | FW | Felipinho | 26 October 1993 (aged 28) | (Association of Football Federations of Azerbaijan) Araz Naxçivan |
| 3 | FW | Thiago Bolinha | 19 February 1987 (aged 34) | (French Football Federation) ACCS |
| 5 | FW | Fineo de Araujo | 10 April 1987 (aged 34) | (French Football Federation) Sporting Paris |
| 7 | FW | Ramiz Chovdarov | 28 July 1990 (aged 31) | (Association of Football Federations of Azerbaijan) Araz Naxçivan |
| 9 | FW | Rafael Vilela | 12 March 1993 (aged 28) | (Royal Spanish Football Federation) Palma Futsal |
| 11 | FW | Khatai Baghirov | 15 August 1987 (aged 34) | (Association of Football Federations of Azerbaijan) Araz Naxçivan |
| 17 | FW | Isa Atayev | 7 August 1989 (aged 32) | (Association of Football Federations of Azerbaijan) Araz Naxçivan |

=== Bosnia and Herzegovina ===
Head coach: Ivo Krezo
Goalkeeper Andrijano Dujmović had to play on the team's first group stage match due to the suspension received by goalkeepers Darko Milanović and Stanislav Galić for their red cards in the last game of the UEFA Futsal Euro 2022 qualifying.

| No. | Pos. | Player | Date of birth (age) | Club |
|---|---|---|---|---|
| 1 | GK | Darko Milanović | 15 October 1991 (aged 30) | (Football Association of Bosnia and Herzegovina) FC Salines |
| 12 | GK | Stanislav Galić | 26 September 1986 (aged 35) | (Football Association of Bosnia and Herzegovina) FC Mostar SG |
| 15 | GK | Andrijano Dujmović | 12 October 1988 (aged 33) | (Football Association of Bosnia and Herzegovina) MNK Hercegovina |
| 4 | DF | Davor Arnautović | 3 September 1991 (aged 30) | (Football Association of Bosnia and Herzegovina) FC Salines |
| 8 | DF | Marijo Aladžić | 30 June 1994 (aged 27) | (Football Association of Bosnia and Herzegovina) FC Mostar SG |
| 14 | DF | Kristijan Pantić | 16 April 1996 (aged 25) | (Football Association of Bosnia and Herzegovina) MNK Brotnjo |
| 2 | FW | Almedin Bundevica | 6 February 1996 (aged 25) | (Football Association of Bosnia and Herzegovina) KMF Doboj |
| 3 | FW | Josip Sesar | 16 October 1992 (aged 29) | (German Football Association) Stuttgarter Futsal Club |
| 5 | FW | Blago Gašpar | 17 June 1997 (aged 24) | (Croatian Football Federation) MNK Novo Vrijeme |
| 6 | FW | Srdjan Ivanković | 25 January 1994 (aged 27) | (German Football Association) Stuttgarter Futsal Club |
| 7 | FW | Bilal Jelić | 1 September 1994 (aged 27) | (Football Association of Bosnia and Herzegovina) FC Mostar SG |
| 9 | FW | Nermin Kahvedžić | 5 November 1987 (aged 34) | (Football Association of Bosnia and Herzegovina) FC Mostar SG |
| 10 | FW | Anel Radmilović (captain) | 29 August 1988 (aged 33) | (Football Association of Bosnia and Herzegovina) FC Mostar SG |
| 11 | FW | Josip Bošković | 25 February 1993 (aged 28) | (Croatian Football Federation) HMNK Vrgorac |
| 16 | FW | Samir Gosto | 16 May 1998 (aged 23) | (Football Association of Bosnia and Herzegovina) FC Mostar SG |
