= 2016–17 Slovenian Futsal League =

Slovenian Futsal League
- Season: 2016–17
- Champions: Brezje (2nd title)
- Relegated: Tomaž
- Futsal Cup: Brezje
- Matches: 112
- Goals: 816 (7.29 per match)
- Top goalscorer: Slaven Radišković (39 goals)
- Biggest home win: Dobovec 10–2 Benedikt
- Biggest away win: Tomaž 2–10 Dobovec
- Highest scoring: Brezje 10–11 Litija
- Longest winning run: 20 matches Brezje
- Longest unbeaten run: 22 matches Brezje
- Longest winless run: 9 matches Tomaž
- Longest losing run: 8 matches Tomaž
- Highest attendance: 500; Bronx 2–6 Litija
- Lowest attendance: 60; Litija 5–1 Puntar
- Total attendance: 16,545
- Average attendance: 149

The 2016–17 Slovenian Futsal League season (also known as the 1. SFL) was the 22nd edition of the Futsal League since its establishment in 1995. The regular season started on 23 September 2016 and concluded on 10 March 2017. The championship play-offs were played after the end of the regular season.

Brezje Maribor were the defending champions by defeating Litija in the finals of the 2015–16 season, winning its first title. They successfully defended the title, again defeating Litija 3–1 in the finals, to win their second consecutive title.

== Competition format ==
Each team played a total of 18 matches (9 home and 9 away) in the regular season. Teams played two matches against each other (1 home and 1 away).

== Teams ==
Location of teams in the 2016–17 Slovenian Futsal League.

A total of 10 teams contested the league, including eight from the previous season and two promoted from the Second League. Tomaž won direct promotion as the winners of the 2015–16 Second League. The play-off for the final spot in the top division was played between Ajdovščina and Zavas Siliko. Zavas won the play-off fixture with the score 5–3 on aggregate and promoted to the First League for the 2016–17 season.

Team	Location	Hall	Capacity
Benedikt	Benedikt	Benedikt Sports Hall	650
Brezje Maribor	Maribor	Tabor Hall	3,261
Bronx Škofije	Zgornje Škofije	Burja Sports Hall	700
Dobovec	Rogatec	Rogatec Sports Hall	600
Litija	Litija	Litija Sports Hall	1,500
Oplast Kobarid	Kobarid	Kobarid Sports Hall	500
Puntar	Tolmin	Tolmin Sports Hall	1,000
Sevnica	Boštanj	Sevnica Sports Hall	1,000
Tomaž	Sveti Tomaž	ŠIC Sports Hall	600
Zavas Siliko	Vrhnika	Anton Slomšek Sports Hall	500

== Regular season ==
=== Standings ===
Pos	Team	Pld	W	D	L	GF	GA	GD	Pts	Qualification or relegation
1	Brezje Maribor	18	17	1	0	101	45	+56	52	Qualification to the Championship play-offs
2	Litija	18	11	4	3	73	49	+24	37	Qualification to the Championship play-offs
3	Bronx Škofije	18	10	1	7	77	68	+9	31	Qualification to the Championship play-offs
4	Dobovec	18	8	3	7	71	56	+15	27	Qualification to the Championship play-offs
5	Oplast Kobarid	18	8	3	7	60	49	+11	27	Qualification to the Championship play-offs
6	Sevnica	18	7	2	9	49	57	−8	23	Qualification to the Championship play-offs
7	Puntar	18	6	0	12	37	73	−36	18	Qualification to the Championship play-offs
8	Zavas Siliko	18	5	3	10	55	76	−21	18	Qualification to the Championship play-offs
9	Benedikt (Q)	18	5	2	11	67	74	−7	17	Qualification to Relegation play-off
10	Tomaž (R)	18	2	3	13	42	85	−43	9	Relegation to Second League

Source: Futsal NZS and futsal.si
(Q) Qualified for the phase indicated; (R) Relegated

=== Results ===
Round 1
Date	Team	Result	Team	Attendance	Report
23; September; 2016	Benedikt	4–6	Bronx Škofije	100	Report
23; September; 2016	Sevnica	2–7	Tomaž	100	Report
23; September; 2016	Dobovec	3–4	Brezje Maribor	200	Report
23; September; 2016	Puntar	0–5	Oplast Kobarid	250	Report
23; September; 2016	Zavas	2–6	Litija	300	Report

Round 2
Date	Team	Result	Team	Attendance	Report
30; September; 2016	Tomaž	2–10	Dobovec	255	Report
30; September; 2016	Sevnica	3–0	Oplast Kobarid	100	Report
30; September; 2016	Litija	4–4	Brezje Maribor		Report
30; September; 2016	Bronx Škofije	2–1	Puntar	200	Report
30; September; 2016	Zavas	6–3	Benedikt	95	Report

Round 3
Date	Team	Result	Team	Attendance	Report
7 October; 2016	Puntar	3–1	Zavas	80	Report
7 October; 2016	Sevnica	3–1	Bronx Škofije	100	Report
7 October; 2016	Brezje Maribor	3–2	Tomaž	110	Report
7 October; 2016	Benedikt	2–2	Litija	70	Report
7 October; 2016	Dobovec	1–3	Oplast Kobarid	150	Report

Round 4
Date	Team	Result	Team	Attendance	Report
19 & 21; September; 2016	Zavas	0–3	Sevnica	100	Report
19 & 21; September; 2016	Oplast Kobarid	2–4	Brezje Maribor	160	Report
19 & 21; September; 2016	Benedikt	7–1	Puntar	150	Report
19 & 21; September; 2016	Litija	7–0	Tomaž	80	Report
19 & 21; September; 2016	Bronx Škofije	3–1	Dobovec	150	Report

Round 5
Date	Team	Result	Team	Attendance	Report
4 November; 2016	Tomaž	3–3	Oplast Kobarid	200	Report
4 November; 2016	Puntar	1–5	Litija	120	Report
4 November; 2016	Sevnica	4–2	Benedikt	70	Report
4 November; 2016	Brezje Maribor	6–4	Bronx Škofije	100	Report
4 November; 2016	Dobovec	4–6	Zavas	100	Report

Round 6
Date	Team	Result	Team	Attendance	Report
11; November; 2016	Puntar	0–1	Sevnica	80	Report
11; November; 2016	Litija	4–2	Oplast Kobarid	70	Report
11; November; 2016	Benedikt	3–4	Dobovec	135	Report
11; November; 2016	Bronx Škofije	3–2	Tomaž	150	Report
11; November; 2016	Zavas	1–6	Brezje Maribor	250	Report

Round 7
Date	Team	Result	Team	Attendance	Report
18; November; 2016	Tomaž	2–2	Zavas	220	Report
18; November; 2016	Sevnica	1–2	Litija	150	Report
18; November; 2016	Dobovec	8–2	Puntar	100	Report
18; November; 2016	Oplast Kobarid	6–0	Bronx Škofije	350	Report
18; November; 2016	Brezje Maribor	5–2	Benedikt	100	Report

Round 8
Date	Team	Result	Team	Attendance	Report
2 December; 2016	Puntar	2–9	Brezje Maribor	150	Report
2 December; 2016	Sevnica	2–3	Dobovec	100	Report
2 December; 2016	Benedikt	9–4	Tomaž	200	Report
2 December; 2016	Litija	5–3	Bronx Škofije	90	Report
2 December; 2016	Zavas	4–4	Oplast Kobarid	120	Report

Round 9
Date	Team	Result	Team	Attendance	Report
9 December; 2016	Tomaž	5–3	Puntar	200	Report
9 December; 2016	Oplast Kobarid	7–3	Benedikt	200	Report
9 December; 2016	Brezje Maribor	3–2	Sevnica	80	Report
9 December; 2016	Bronx Škofije	5–3	Zavas	140	Report
9 December; 2016	Dobovec	4–2	Litija	120	Report

Round 10
Date	Team	Result	Team	Attendance	Report
23; December; 2016	Tomaž	1–1	Sevnica	200	Report
23; December; 2016	Brezje Maribor	7–1	Dobovec	100	Report
23; December; 2016	Litija	6–1	Zavas	80	Report
23; December; 2016	Oplast Kobarid	1–2	Puntar	300	Report
23; December; 2016	Bronx Škofije	4–5	Benedikt	150	Report

Round 11
Date	Team	Result	Team	Attendance	Report
16–18; January; 2017	Dobovec	6–3	Tomaž	80	Report
16–18; January; 2017	Benedikt	2–3	Zavas	80	Report
16–18; January; 2017	Oplast Kobarid	7–3	Sevnica	100	Report
16–18; January; 2017	Puntar	5–4	Bronx Škofije	70	Report
16–18; January; 2017	Brezje Maribor	4–3	Litija	135	Report

Round 12
Date	Team	Result	Team	Attendance	Report
20; January; 2017	Tomaž	1–8	Brezje Maribor	150	Report
20; January; 2017	Oplast Kobarid	4–2	Dobovec	100	Report
20; January; 2017	Litija	5–4	Benedikt	100	Report
20; January; 2017	Zavas	5–3	Puntar	130	Report
20; January; 2017	Bronx Škofije	5–3	Sevnica	150	Report

Round 13
Date	Team	Result	Team	Attendance	Report
7 & 8 February; 2017	Sevnica	4–3	Zavas	120	Report
7 & 8 February; 2017	Puntar	2–1	Benedikt	150	Report
7 & 8 February; 2017	Tomaž	3–6	Litija	150	Report
7 & 8 February; 2017	Dobovec	5–5	Bronx Škofije	110	Report
7 & 8 February; 2017	Brezje Maribor	2–1	Oplast Kobarid	100	Report

Round 14
Date	Team	Result	Team	Attendance	Report
3 February; 2017	Oplast Kobarid	4–0	Tomaž	90	Report
3 February; 2017	Litija	5–1	Puntar	60	Report
3 February; 2017	Benedikt	3–3	Sevnica	150	Report
3 February; 2017	Zavas	1–1	Dobovec	160	Report
3 February; 2017	Bronx Škofije	2–7	Brezje Maribor	150	Report

Round 15
Date	Team	Result	Team	Attendance	Report
10; February; 2017	Tomaž	4–7	Bronx Škofije	150	Report
10; February; 2017	Sevnica	5–1	Puntar	100	Report
10; February; 2017	Brezje Maribor	6–4	Zavas	80	Report
10; February; 2017	Dobovec	10–2	Benedikt	100	Report
10; February; 2017	Oplast Kobarid	3–3	Litija	300	Report

Round 16
Date	Team	Result	Team	Attendance	Report
17; February; 2017	Puntar	4–0	Dobovec	200	Report
17; February; 2017	Benedikt	3–6	Brezje Maribor	150	Report
17; February; 2017	Litija	4–3	Sevnica	110	Report
17; February; 2017	Zavas	5–2	Tomaž	200	Report
17; February; 2017	Bronx Škofije	3–1	Oplast Kobarid	150	Report

Round 17
Date	Team	Result	Team	Attendance	Report
24; February; 2017	Bronx Škofije	9–2	Litija	110	Report
24; February; 2017	Oplast Kobarid	5–3	Zavas	150	Report
24; February; 2017	Tomaž	0–3	Benedikt	200	Report
24; February; 2017	Brezje Maribor	8–3	Puntar	100	Report
24; February; 2017	Dobovec	6–1	Sevnica	100	Report

Round 18
Date	Team	Result	Team	Attendance	Report
10; March; 2017	Litija	2–2	Dobovec	120	Report
10; March; 2017	Sevnica	5–9	Brezje Maribor	60	Report
10; March; 2017	Puntar	3–1	Tomaž	100	Report
10; March; 2017	Benedikt	9–2	Oplast Kobarid	135	Report
10; March; 2017	Zavas	5–11	Bronx Škofije	95	Report

== Championship play-offs ==
=== Bracket ===
Quarter-finals were played in a best-of-three series, while the semi-finals and the final were played in a best-of-five series.

Quarter-finals
1	Brezje Maribor	8	5
8	Zavas Siliko	3	0
4	Dobovec	1	5	4
5	Oplast Kobarid	5	3	5
2	Litija	2	3
7	Puntar	0	2
3	Bronx Škofije	6	7
6	Sevnica	2	4

Semi-finals
1	Brezje Maribor	5	6	1	7
5	Oplast Kobarid	2	1	5	6
2	Litija	6	5	5
3	Bronx Škofije	2	2	0

Final
1	Brezje Maribor	7	10	5	6
2	Litija	6	11	0	5

=== Quarter-finals ===
==== First match ====
17 March 2017	Oplast Kobarid	5–1	Dobovec	Kobarid
20:00 CET	Širok 1', 25', 38'; Lenarčič 31'; Kravanja 38'	Report	Bizjak 39'	Stadium: Kobarid Sports Hall; Attendance: 200; Referee: Močnik Perič, Bubulj

17 March 2017	Litija	2–0	Puntar	Litija
20:00 CET	Cortez Pontes 28'; Čujec 35'	Report		Stadium: Litija Sports Hall; Attendance: 100; Referee: Zahović, Hozyan

17 March 2017	Brezje Maribor	8–3	Zavas Siliko	Maribor
20:00 CET	Hasanbegović 7'; Totošković 7', 10'; Fetić 10'; Fideršek 12', 26'; Jandrić 31', 33'	Report	Behrić 5'; Kunc 20'; Ćosić 40'	Stadium: Lukna Sports Hall; Attendance: 80; Referee: Božič, Rustja

17 March 2017	Bronx Škofije	6–2	Sevnica	Zgornje Škofije
20:30 CET	Radišković 8', 19', 31'; Zajc 34', 40'; Hrvatin 40'	Report	Krnc 20'; Grigić 29'	Stadium: Burja Sports Hall; Attendance: 180; Referee: Todorović, Bobar

==== Second match ====
24 March 2017	Puntar	2–3	Litija	Tolmin
19:00 CET	Kragelj 2'; Sever 5' (o.g.)	Report	Rocha Velloso 5'; Cortez Pontes 27', 27'	Stadium: Tolmin Sports Hall; Attendance: 170; Referee: Močnik Perič, Bubulj

24 March 2017	Sevnica	4–7	Bronx Škofije	Sevnica
20:00 CET	Govekar 8', 18'; Nečemer 36'; Krnc 40'	Report	Radišković 5', 19'; Zajc 15', 21', 35', 35' (pen.); Hrvatin 38'	Stadium: Sevnica Sports Hall; Attendance: 100; Referee: Zahović, Sakelšek

24 March 2017	Dobovec	5–3	Oplast Kobarid	Rogaška Slatina
20:30 CET	Marot 18'; Vrabel 24'; Jurić 26'; Bizjak 35', 40'	Report	Lenarčič 10'; Kravanja 33'; Širok 39'	Stadium: Ratanska vas Sports Hall; Attendance: 100; Referee: Todorović, Bobar

24 March 2017	Zavas Siliko	0–5	Brezje Maribor	Vrhnika
20:30 CET		Report	Fideršek 2'; Totošković 8', 34'; Hasanbegović 18'; Jandrić 20'	Stadium: Anton Slomšek Sports Hall; Attendance: 150; Referee: Makivič, Janžekovič

==== Third match ====
28 March 2017	Oplast Kobarid	5–4	Dobovec	Kobarid
20:00 CEST	Kos 8'; Melink 19', 20'; Širok 34', 35'	Report	Vrabel 1'; Drobne 30', 40'; Jurić 35'	Stadium: Kobarid Sports Hall; Attendance: 200; Referee: Močnik Perič, Bubulj

=== Semi-finals ===
==== First match ====
31 March 2017	Brezje Maribor	5–2	Oplast Kobarid	Maribor
20:00 CEST	Totošković 6', 17'; Fetić 17', 40'; Fideršek 27'	Report	Kos 28'; Širok 40'	Stadium: Lukna Sports Hall; Attendance: 150; Referee: Todorović, Korošec

31 March 2017	Bronx Škofije	2–6	FC Litija	Zgornje Škofije
20:30 CEST	Radišković 5'; Zajc 30'	Report	Sever 2'; Cortez Pontes 6', 12'; Vrhovec 23'; Šturm 37'; Jelić 40'	Stadium: Burja Sports Hall; Attendance: 500; Referee: Zahović, Veselič

==== Second match ====
11 April 2017	Litija	5–2	Bronx Škofije	Litija
20:00 CEST	Rocha Velloso 1'; Cortez Pontes 7', 21'; Jelić 18'; Čujec 39'	Report	Grželj 39'; Hrvatin 40'	Stadium: Litija Sports Hall; Attendance: 120; Referee: Močnik Perič, Božič

11 April 2017	Brezje Maribor	6–1	Oplast Kobarid	Maribor
20:00 CEST	Fetić 18'; Totošković 23', 27'; Hasanbegović 24', 39'; Jandrić 40'	Report	Kravanja 30'	Stadium: Tabor Hall; Attendance: 95; Referee: Jurič, Kovačič

==== Third match ====
14 April 2017	Litija	5–0	Bronx Škofije	Litija
20:00 CEST	Cortez Pontes 4', 30', 33'; Rocha Velloso 24'; Duščak 26'	Report		Stadium: Litija Sports Hall; Attendance: 100; Referee: Zahović, Veselič

14 April 2017	Oplast Kobarid	5–1	Brezje Maribor	Kobarid
20:00 CEST	Širok 6', 30'; Kravanja 25'; Lenarčič 30', 31'	Report	Grdović 37'	Stadium: Kobarid Sports Hall; Attendance: 210; Referee: Todorović, Bobar

==== Fourth match ====
18 April 2017	Oplast Kobarid	4–4 (2–3 p)	Brezje Maribor	Kobarid
20:00 CEST	Kravanja 5'; Sovdat 6'; Koren 14'; Širok 36'	Report	Fetić 15' (pen.); Čeh 19'; Fideršek 26'; Jandrić 34'	Stadium: Kobarid Sports Hall; Attendance: 150; Referee: Todorović, Bobar
	Penalties
	Sovdat (penalty scored); Kravanja (penalty scored)		(penalty scored) Čeh; (penalty scored) Totošković; (penalty scored) Fetić

=== Final ===
==== First match ====
21 April 2017	Brezje Maribor	2–2 (5–4 p)	Litija	Maribor
19:00 CEST	Čeh 24' (pen.); Hasanbegović 26'	Report	Duščak 13', 22'	Stadium: Tabor Hall; Attendance: 300; Referee: Jurič, Kovačič
	Penalties
	Čeh (penalty scored); Totošković (penalty missed); Fetić (penalty scored); Fideršek (penalty scored); Jandrić (penalty scored); Hasanbegović (penalty scored)		(penalty scored) Cortez Pontes; (penalty scored) Rocha Velloso; (penalty missed) Vrhovec; (penalty scored) Duščak; (penalty scored) Čujec; (penalty missed) Čujec

==== Second match ====
25 April 2017	Brezje Maribor	5–5 (5–6 p)	Litija	Maribor
20:00 CEST	Hasanbegović 7', 29'; Fideršek 22', 38'; Čeh 36'	Report	Vrhovec 7'; Rocha Velloso 18', 34'; Cortez Pontes 34'; Turk 36'	Stadium: Tabor Hall; Attendance: 300; Referee: Sakelšek, Korošec
	Penalties
	Čeh (penalty scored); Fideršek (penalty scored); Fetić (penalty scored); Jandrić (penalty scored); Hasanbegović (penalty scored); Škorić (penalty missed)		(penalty scored) Rocha Velloso; (penalty scored) Duščak; (penalty scored) Cortez Pontes; (penalty scored) Vrhovec; (penalty scored) Turk; (penalty scored) Čujec

==== Third match ====
28 April 2017	Litija	0–5	Brezje Maribor	Litija
20:00 CEST		Report	Totošković 4', 24'; Hasanbegović 11', 16'; Čeh 28'	Stadium: Litija Sports Hall; Attendance: 400; Referee: Močnik Perič, Makivič

==== Fourth match ====
2 May 2017	Litija	4–4 (1–2 p)	Brezje Maribor	Litija
20:00 CEST	Jelić 3'; Rocha Velloso 18', 20'; Cortez Pontes 38'	Report	Čeh 4', 35', 40'; Totošković 12'	Stadium: Litija Sports Hall; Attendance: 400; Referee: Sakelšek, Korošec
	Penalties
	Rocha Velloso (penalty scored); Duščak (penalty missed); Cortez Pontes (penalty missed)		(penalty missed) Čeh; (penalty scored) Fideršek; (penalty scored) Fetić

== Third place match ==
Team 1	Agg.	Team 2	1st leg	2nd leg
Oplast Kobarid	10–6	Bronx Škofije	3–2	7–4

== Relegation play-off ==
Team 1	Agg.	Team 2	1st leg	2nd leg
Benedikt	12–7	FSK Stripy	7–4	5–3

== Statistics ==
=== Top scorers ===
Rank	Player	Club	Goals
1	(Slovenia) Slaven Radišković	Bronx Škofije	39
2	(Slovenia) Matej Fideršek	Brezje Maribor	33
3	(Slovenia) Žiga Čeh	Brezje Maribor	28
3	(Slovenia) Bojan Klemenčič	Benedikt	28
5	(Slovenia) Nik Zajc	Bronx Škofije	27
6	(Slovenia) Denis Totošković	Brezje Maribor	26
7	(Slovenia) Alen Fetić	Brezje Maribor	25
8	(Slovenia) Anže Širok	Oplast Kobarid	23
9	(Slovenia) Nermin Hasanbegović	Brezje Maribor	22
9	(Slovenia) Tine Kravanja	Oplast Kobarid	22

Source: Futsal NZS

== See also ==
- 2016–17 Slovenian Futsal Cup
