= 2016–17 Slovenian Futsal Cup =

Tournament details
- Country: Slovenia
- Teams: 16

Final positions
- Champions: Brezje Maribor (2nd title)
- Runner-up: Bronx Škofije

Tournament statistics
- Matches played: 19
- Goals scored: 123 (6.47 per match)
- Attendance: 2,590 (136 per match)
- Top goal scorer(s): Žiga Čeh (8 goals)

The 2016–17 Slovenian Futsal Cup was the 22nd edition of Slovenia's futsal knockout competition. Brezje Maribor were the defending champions, having won their first title in the 2015–16 edition. They successfully defended their title by defeating Bronx Škofije 6–2 in the final.

== Competition format ==
Round	Draw date	Match date	Fixtures	Clubs	Format details
Round of 16	3 October 2016	14 October 2016	8	16 → 8	Eight clubs that qualified through MNZ Regional Cups + eight top ranked teams from the 2015–16 Slovenian Futsal League entered in this stage. Teams from the same regional cup could not have been drawn against each other. Winners were decided over one leg. Lower level teams were the hosts. If both teams from a pair were from the same level, hosting was determined by the draw.
Quarter-finals	2 November 2016	25 November 2016 & 16 December 2016	4	8 → 4	Eight winners from Round of 16 were drawn into four pairs. Winners were decided over two legs on home and away matches.
Semi-finals		4 March 2017	2	4 → 2	4 teams were drawn into 2 pairs. Winners were decided in a single game in Podčetrtek.
Final	N/A	5 March 2017	1	2 → 1	Winner was decided in a single game in Podčetrtek.

== Qualified teams ==
=== 2015–16 Slovenian Futsal League (top 8) ===
- Oplast Kobarid
- Brezje Maribor
- Dobovec
- Litija
- Sevnica
- Puntar
- Bronx Škofije
- Benedikt

=== Qualified through MNZ Regional Cups ===
- Black and White
- Stripy
- Slovenske Gorice
- Mlinše
- Zavas
- Tomaž
- Gorica
- Kebelj pizzeria Salama

== Round of 16 ==
Team 1	Score	Team 2
Black and White	1–7	Stripy
Slovenske Gorice	4–8	Oplast Kobarid
Mlinše	0–4	Sevnica
Zavas	1–5	Puntar
Bronx Škofije	4–2	Tomaž
Gorica	4–2	Benedikt
Kebelj pizzeria Salama	3–5	Dobovec
Brezje Maribor	4–2	Litija

== Quarter-finals ==
Team 1	Agg.	Team 2	1st leg	2nd leg
Sevnica	5–4	Oplast Kobarid	1–1	4–3
Stripy	4–6	Gorica	4–3	0–3
Bronx Škofije	7–7	Puntar	3–1	4–6
Dobovec	5–12	Brezje Maribor	3–7	2–5

== Final four ==
Bronx Škofije, Brezje Maribor, Sevnica and Gorica have qualified for the final tournament, which was held in Podčetrtek.

=== Bracket ===
Semi-finals
Podčetrtek
Bronx Škofije	4
Gorica	1
Podčetrtek
Brezje Maribor (p)	2 (2)
Sevnica	2 (0)

Final
Podčetrtek
Bronx Škofije	2
Brezje Maribor	6

=== Semi-finals ===
4 March 2017 3	Bronx Škofije	4–1	Gorica	Podčetrtek
16:30 CET	Radišković 16', 26'; Zajc 30'; Vanceta 35' (o.g.)	Report	Žarić 27'	Stadium: Podčetrtek Sports Hall; Attendance: 200; Referee: Admir Zahović, Aleš Sakelšek

4 March 2017 3	Brezje Maribor	2–2 (2–0 p)	Sevnica	Podčetrtek
18:30 CET	Fideršek 29'; Čeh 34'	Report	Grigić 28', 38'	Stadium: Podčetrtek Sports Hall; Attendance: 300; Referee: Simon Todorović, Perič Aleš Močnik
	Penalties
	Čeh (penalty scored); Totošković (penalty scored)		(penalty missed) Martić; (penalty missed) Račič

=== Final ===
5 March 2017 4	Bronx Škofije	2–6	Brezje Maribor	Podčetrtek
19:00 CET	Radišković 3'; Zajc 18'	Report	Fideršek 7', 27', 39'; Kraljič 11'; Čeh 14' (pen.); Hasanbegović 17'	Stadium: Podčetrtek Sports Hall; Attendance: 400; Referee: Simon Todorović, Perič Aleš Močnik
