= Slovenian Futsal League =

- Founded: 1995; 31 years ago
- Country: Slovenia
- Confederation: UEFA
- Number of clubs: 11
- Level on pyramid: 1
- Domestic cup(s): Slovenian Futsal Cup; Slovenian Supercup
- International cup: UEFA Futsal Champions League
- Current champions: Siliko Vrhnika (2nd title) (2025–26)
- Most championships: Litija (10 titles)
- Website: www.futsal.si/1sfl/

The Slovenian First Futsal League (Slovene: Prva slovenska futsal liga), also known by the abbreviation 1. SFL, is the main futsal league in Slovenia, organized by the Football Association of Slovenia.

== History ==
=== 1984–1995 ===
The Slovenian Futsal League dates back to 1984, when the tournament system was used to determine the winner. Talci Maribor have won the first championship in the inaugural 1984–85 season. Talci Maribor and Vuko Ljubljana were the most successful teams of the period, winning five and four titles, respectively.

=== 1995–present ===
The competition in its current format was established in the 1995–96 season, when the tournament was transformed into a league system. Juventus from Šentjur became the first champions with the same number of points (43) as runners-up Vuko Ljubljana, but with better head-to-head record. In the following season, the title was won by Litija, which played under the name Assaloni Cosmos at the time due to sponsorship reasons. It was the first of ten titles for Litija, which are, as of 2026, the most successful Slovenian futsal team in terms of titles won.

== 2026–27 teams ==
Team locations in the 2026–27 season

Team	Location	Venue
Benedikt	Benedikt	Benedikt Sports Hall
Bronx Škofije	Škofije	Burja Sports Hall
Dobovec	Rogatec	II. Osnovna šola Ratanska vas
Dobrepolje	Videm	Videm Dobrepolje Sports Hall
Extrem	Ribnica	Sodražica Sports Hall
KIX Ajdovščina	Ajdovščina	Police Sports Hall
Mlinše	Mlinše	Zagorje ob Savi Sports Hall
Oplast Kobarid	Kobarid	Kobarid Sports Hall
Sevnica	Sevnica	OŠ Savo Kladnik Sports Hall
Siliko	Vrhnika	OŠ Antona Slomška Sports Hall
Trzin	Trzin	Trzin Sports Hall

== Champions by year ==
Season	Team
1995–96	Juventus
1996–97	Litija
1997–98	Sevnica
1998–99	Litija
1999–00	Celje
2000–01	Litija
2001–02	Litija
2002–03	Litija
2003–04	Litija
2004–05	Litija
2005–06	Zagorje
2006–07	Puntar

Season	Team
2007–08	Gorica
2008–09	Puntar
2009–10	Oplast Kobarid
2010–11	Litija
2011–12	Litija
2012–13	Litija
2013–14	Oplast Kobarid
2014–15	Dobovec
2015–16	Brezje Maribor
2016–17	Brezje Maribor
2017–18	Dobovec
2018–19	Dobovec

Season	Team
2019–20	No winners (COVID-19 pandemic)
2020–21	Dobovec
2021–22	Dobovec
2022–23	Dobovec
2023–24	Dobovec
2024–25	Siliko Vrhnika
2025–26	Siliko Vrhnika

=== Performance by club ===
Club	Titles	Season
Litija	10	1997, 1999, 2001, 2002, 2003, 2004, 2005, 2011, 2012, 2013
Dobovec	7	2015, 2018, 2019, 2021, 2022, 2023, 2024
Puntar	2	2007, 2009
Oplast Kobarid	2	2010, 2014
Brezje Maribor	2	2016, 2017
Siliko Vrhnika	2	2025, 2026
Šentjur	1	1996
Sevnica	1	1998
Celje	1	2000
Zagorje	1	2006
Gorica	1	2008

=== Top goalscorers by season ===
Season	Goals	Player	Club
1995–96	26	Simon Bogovič	Marmor Hotavlje
1996–97	27	Janko Dolenc	Sevnica
1997–98	25	Danilo Kurnik	Talci Maribor
1998–99	24	Kristjan Stojko	Ljutomer
1999–00	23	Franc Rozman	Sevnica
2000–01	29	Senudin Džafič	Litija
2001–02	30	Valdi Lakošeljac	Bronx Škofije
2002–03	29	Tomi Horvat	Litija
2003–04	38	Tomi Horvat	Litija
2004–05	33	Tomi Horvat	Litija
2005–06	26	Edis Čauševič; Peter Stres	Tomi Press Bronx; Dobovec
2006–07	21	David Šnofl	Zagorje
2007–08	22	Igor Osredkar	Litija
2008–09	30	Rade Rusmir	Živex Pekarna Duh
2009–10	39	Marko Hrvatin	Izola

Season	Goals	Player	Club
2010–11	29	Igor Osredkar; Damir Pertič	Litija
2011–12	30	Blaž Metulj	Nazarje Glin
2012–13	29	Jani Ručna	Oplast Kobarid
2013–14	22	Jaka Sovdat	Oplast Kobarid
2014–15	32	Rok Mordej	Dobovec
2015–16	37	Denis Totošković	Brezje Maribor
2016–17	39	Slaven Radišković	Bronx
2017–18	30	Rok Mordej	Dobovec
2018–19	36	Matej Fideršek	Brezje Maribor
2019–20	23	Kristjan Čujec	Dobovec
2020–21	33	Jonhn Lennon	Litija
2021–22	23	Gašper Vrhovec	Litija
2022–23	29	Jure Suban	Siliko
2023–24	26	Patrik Pasariček	Dobovec
