= Rajko Uršič =

Slovenian futsal player (born 1981)

Personal information
- Date of birth: 20 March 1981 (age 45)
- Position: Pivot

Senior career*
Years	Team	Apps	(Gls)
- Puntar
- Oplast Kobarid
–2009	Puntar		
2009–2015	Oplast Kobarid		

International career
2005–2013	Slovenia	91	(19)
- * Club domestic league appearances and goals

Rajko Uršič (born 20 March 1981) is a retired Slovenian futsal player. He played for the Slovenia national futsal team.
