= Slovenian Futsal Cup =

- Founded: 1995; 31 years ago
- Region: Slovenia
- Current champions: Dobovec (9th title)
- Most championships: Dobovec; Litija (both 9 titles)
- Website: nzs.si

The Slovenian Futsal Cup, currently named Pokal Terme Olimia due to the sponsorship reasons, is the top knockout tournament of Slovenian futsal and the second most important futsal competition in Slovenia after the Slovenian Futsal League. It is organized by the Football Association of Slovenia and was established in the 1995–96 season. Since 2013, the Final 4 tournament has been held in Podčetrtek.

The most successful clubs are Dobovec and Litija with nine titles each, followed by Puntar and Oplast Kobarid with three titles each. Luvin Maribor and Brezje, both from Maribor, have won two titles each, while Celje, Gorica and Bronx Škofije have won one title each.

== Finals ==
=== By season ===
List of finals
| Season | Winners | Runners-up | Score |
|---|---|---|---|
| 1995–96 | Litija | Orkan Zbelovo | 6–2 |
| 1996–97 | Luvin Maribor | Sevnica | 5–4; 5–4 |
| 1997–98 | Luvin Maribor | Black & White Koper | 3–3; 6–1 |
| 1998–99 | Litija | Zagorje | 3–4; 3–1 |
| 1999–2000 | Litija | Celje | 5–1; 4–1 |
| 2000–01 | Celje | Litija | 1–2; 7–4 |
| 2001–02 | Litija | Beton Lucija | 2–3; 5–3 |
| 2002–03 | Litija | Zagorje | 9–4; 3–3 |
| 2003–04 | Puntar | Oplast Kobarid | 6–2 |
| 2004–05 | Oplast Kobarid | Puntar | 1–1 (7–6 pen.) |
| 2005–06 | Oplast Kobarid | Zagorje | 1–1 (4–3 pen.) |
| 2006–07 | Puntar | Zagorje | 3–2 |
| 2007–08 | Puntar | Gorica | 2–1 |
| 2008–09 | Gorica | Oplast Kobarid | 3–1 |
| 2009–10 | Litija | Gorica | 3–0 |
| 2010–11 | Litija | Bronx Škofije | 8–4 |
| 2011–12 | Litija | Dobovec | 3–1 |
| 2012–13 | Bronx Škofije | Dobovec | 6–4 |
| 2013–14 | Litija | Sevnica | 4–1 |
| 2014–15 | Oplast Kobarid | Dobovec | 11–7 |
| 2015–16 | Brezje Maribor | Dobovec | 3–0 |
| 2016–17 | Brezje Maribor | Bronx Škofije | 6–2 |
| 2017–18 | Dobovec | Litija | 4–2 |
| 2018–19 | Dobovec | Brezje Maribor | 3–1 |
| 2019–20 | Dobovec | Oplast Kobarid | 4–0 |
| 2020–21 | Dobovec | Litija | 1–0 |
| 2021–22 | Dobovec | Ptuj | 6–1 |
| 2022–23 | Dobovec | Dobrepolje | 9–1 |
| 2023–24 | Dobovec | Meteorplast | 4–2 |
| 2024–25 | Dobovec | Bronx Škofije | 7–4 |
| 2025–26 | Dobovec | Siliko Vrhnika | 2–2 (4–2 pen.) |

=== By club ===
| Club | Titles | Years won |
|---|---|---|
| Litija | 9 | 1995–96, 1998–99, 1999–2000, 2001–02, 2002–03, 2009–10, 2010–11, 2011–12, 2013–14 |
| Dobovec | 9 | 2017–18, 2018–19, 2019–20, 2020–21, 2021–22, 2022–23, 2023–24, 2024–25, 2025–26 |
| Puntar | 3 | 2003–04, 2006–07, 2007–08 |
| Oplast Kobarid | 3 | 2004–05, 2005–06, 2014–15 |
| Luvin Maribor | 2 | 1996–97, 1997–98 |
| Brezje Maribor | 2 | 2015–16, 2016–17 |
| Celje | 1 | 2000–01 |
| Gorica | 1 | 2008–09 |
| Bronx Škofije | 1 | 2012–13 |
