= ŠD Brezje =

Brezje Maribor
- Full name: Športno društvo Brezje Maribor
- Nickname(s): Vijolice (The Violets)
- Founded: 2011; 14 years ago
- Dissolved: 2019; 6 years ago
- Ground: Tabor Hall
- Capacity: 3,261
Home colours	Away colours

Športno društvo Brezje Maribor or simply ŠD Brezje was a futsal club from Maribor, Slovenia. They won the Slovenian Futsal League two times, in 2016 and 2017.

== History ==
ŠD Brezje was founded in 2011, when the club started competing in the Slovenian second division. In their second season, the team was promoted to the top tier Slovenian Futsal League. After finishing in third place in the 2014–15 season, the team won the league title in the 2015–16 season, defeating FC Litija 3–1 in series in the final. The club, competing under the name PROEN Maribor due to sponsorship reasons, has also won the Slovenian Cup in the same season.

In the 2016–17 season, ŠD Brezje debuted in international competitions as the club competed in the 2016–17 UEFA Futsal Cup, where they reached the elite round. The team has won the Slovenian Cup trophy for the second time in a row during the 2016–17 season, defeating Bronx Škofije 6–2 in the final on 5 March 2017. Brezje has also defended the national title, again defeating Litija 3–1 in the final. In the 2017–18 UEFA Futsal Cup, Brezje started in the main round of the competition, where the team was eliminated with three defeats out of three games. In the same season, Brezje failed to retain the national championship as the team finished the season in third place. After the 2018–19 season, when Brezje finished as runners-up of the national league, the team was dissolved due to financial problems.

=== Name changes ===
Club names through history:

- ŠD Brezje (2011–2013)
- RE/MAX Brezje Maribor (2014–2015)
- PROEN Maribor (2016–2017)
- FutureNet Maribor (2017–2019)

== Arena ==
The team played their home matches at Tabor Hall in the Tabor District of Maribor. Their secondary venue was a 2,100 capacity Lukna Sports Hall, also located in Maribor.

== Honours ==
- Slovenian Championship
  - Winners: 2015–16, 2016–17
  - Runners-up: 2018–19
- Slovenian Cup
  - Winners: 2015–16, 2016–17
  - Runners-up: 2018–19
- Slovenian Supercup
  - Runners-up: 2016, 2017
- MNZ Maribor Cup
  - Winners: 2013–14, 2014–15

== Season-by-season records ==
Season	Division	League	Pos.	Cup	Supercup	UEFA Futsal Cup
2011–12	2	2. SFL	5	—	—	—
2012–13	2	2. SFL	3	—	—	—
2013–14	1	1. SFL	7	Round of 16	—	—
2014–15	1	1. SFL	3	Quarterfinals	—	—
2015–16	1	1. SFL	1	Winners	—	—
2016–17	1	1. SFL	1	Winners	Runners-up	Elite round
2017–18	1	1. SFL	3	Quarterfinals	Runners-up	Main round
2018–19	1	1. SFL	2	Runners-up	—	—

== UEFA club competitions record ==
All results list Brezje's goal tally first.

Season	Competition	Round	Opponent	Result
2016–17	UEFA Futsal Cup	Preliminary round	(Albania) KF Tirana	4–2
2016–17	UEFA Futsal Cup	Preliminary round	(Luxembourg) FC Munsbach	14–2
2016–17	UEFA Futsal Cup	Preliminary round	(Poland) Zduńska Wola	6–4
2016–17	UEFA Futsal Cup	Main round	(Hungary) ETO Győr	0–4
2016–17	UEFA Futsal Cup	Main round	(Ukraine) Energia Lviv	6–2
2016–17	UEFA Futsal Cup	Main round	(France) Kremlin-Bicêtre United	1–2
2016–17	UEFA Futsal Cup	Elite round	(Serbia) Ekonomac	6–2
2016–17	UEFA Futsal Cup	Elite round	(Czech Republic) EP Chrudim	1–4
2016–17	UEFA Futsal Cup	Elite round	(Spain) Inter FS	1–3
2017–18	UEFA Futsal Cup	Main round	(Russia) Dina Moskva	2–5
2017–18	UEFA Futsal Cup	Main round	(Portugal) Braga/AAUM	2–3
2017–18	UEFA Futsal Cup	Main round	(Spain) Inter FS	1–4

== International players ==
The following ŠD Brezje players were capped at full international level.

Bosnia and Herzegovina

- Dario Markić
- Ivan Matan

Croatia

- Robert Grdović
- Josip Jurić
- Kristijan Postružin
- Marinko Šamija

Serbia

- Miloš Stojković

Slovenia

- Jeremy Bukovec
- Žiga Čeh
- Sebastijan Drobne
- Alen Fetić
- Matej Fideršek
- Suad Fileković
- Tilen Gajser
- Nikola Jandrić
- Nikola Jelić
- Uroš Kroflič
- Tjaž Lovrenčič
- Damir Puškar
- Vid Sever
- Milivoje Simeunović
- Davorin Šnofl
- Jaka Sovdat
- Denis Totošković
- Teo Turk
- Aleš Vrabel

== Managers ==
- Boris Šprah (2011–2013)
- Dejan Kraut (2013)
- Simon Šabeder (2013–2014)
- Drago Adamič (2014–2015)
- Senudin Džafić (2015–2016)
- Robert Grdović (2016–2017)
- Matej Gajser (2017–2018)
- Tomislav Horvat (2018–2019)
