= Damir Puškar =

Slovenian futsal player (born 1987)

Personal information
- Date of birth: 3 September 1987 (age 39)
- Place of birth: Ljubljana, SFR Yugoslavia
- Height: 1.80 m (5 ft 11 in)
- Position: Goalkeeper

Youth career
- Slovan

Senior career*
Years	Team	Apps	(Gls)
2005–2008	Joma Buon Piatto		
2008–2015	Litija		
2015–2017	Brezje Maribor		
2017–2022	Dobovec		

International career
2006–2008	Slovenia U21	31	(1)
2009–2020	Slovenia	115	(0)
- * Club domestic league appearances and goals

Damir Puškar (born 3 September 1987) is a retired Slovenian futsal player who played as a goalkeeper. Between 2009 and 2020, he represented the Slovenia national team, making 115 appearances.
