= Slovenia national futsal team =

Slovenia
- Association: Football Association of Slovenia
- Confederation: UEFA (Europe)
- Head coach: Tomislav Horvat
- Captain: Igor Osredkar
- Most caps: Igor Osredkar (200)
- Top scorer: Igor Osredkar (92)
- FIFA code: SVN
- FIFA ranking: 25 ▼4 (8 May 2026)
Home colours	Away colours

First international
- Slovakia 1–1 Slovenia (Košice, Slovakia; 15 September 1995)

Biggest win
- Slovenia 14–0 United States (Koper, Slovenia; 27 January 2016)

Biggest defeat
- Spain 10–0 Slovenia (Castellón, Spain; 22 October 1996)

FIFA World Cup
- Appearances: None

European Championship
- Appearances: 8 (First in 2003)
- Best result: Quarter-finals (2014, 2018)

Grand Prix de Futsal
- Appearances: 1 (First in 2007)
- Best result: Sixth place (2007)

The Slovenia national futsal team represents Slovenia in men's international futsal and is controlled by the Football Association of Slovenia. It competes in international futsal competitions, such as the World Cup and the European Championship.

== Managers ==
Name	Period
Željko Pijetlovič	1994–1995
Dušan Razboršek	1995–2000
Darko Križman	2001–2005
Andrej Dobovičnik	2005–2020
Tomislav Horvat	2020–present

== Individual records ==
=== Most appearances ===
Rank	Name	Caps
1	Igor Osredkar	199
2	Kristjan Čujec	128
3	Benjamin Melink	124
4	Alen Fetić	122
5	Damir Puškar	115
6	Rok Mordej	106
7	Matej Fideršek	94
8	Rajko Uršič	91
9	Gašper Vrhovec	90
10	Nejc Hozjan	87

Last updated: 22 April 2025

=== Top goalscorers ===
Rank	Name	Goals
1	Igor Osredkar	92
2	Kristjan Čujec	75
3	Alen Fetić	48
4	Gašper Vrhovec	45
5	Rok Mordej	41
6	Benjamin Melink	35
7	Matej Fideršek	34
8	Jože Gačnik	25
9	Senudin Džafić	24
10	Milivoje Simeunović	23

Last updated: 22 April 2025

== Competitive record ==
=== FIFA Futsal World Cup ===
FIFA Futsal World Cup record
Year	Round	Pld	W	D	L	GF	GA
(Netherlands) 1989	Part of Yugoslavia						
(Hong Kong) 1992	Did not compete						
(Spain) 1996	Did not qualify						
(Guatemala) 2000	Did not qualify						
(Taiwan) 2004	Did not qualify						
(Brazil) 2008	Did not qualify						
(Thailand) 2012	Did not qualify						
(Colombia) 2016	Did not qualify						
(Lithuania) 2021	Did not qualify						
(Uzbekistan) 2024	Did not qualify						

=== UEFA European Futsal Championship ===
UEFA Futsal Championship record
Year	Round	Pld	W	D	L	GF	GA
(Spain) 1996	Did not qualify						
(Spain) 1999	Did not qualify						
(Russia) 2001	Did not qualify						
(Italy) 2003	Group stage	3	0	0	3	7	14
(Czech Republic) 2005	Did not qualify						
(Portugal) 2007	Did not qualify						
(Hungary) 2010	Group stage	2	0	0	2	1	7
(Croatia) 2012	Group stage	2	0	0	2	5	10
(Belgium) 2014	Quarter-finals	3	1	0	2	9	13
(Serbia) 2016	Group stage	2	0	0	2	3	11
(Slovenia) 2018	Quarter-finals	3	1	1	1	4	5
(Netherlands) 2022	Group stage	3	0	2	1	7	8
(Latvia) (Lithuania) (Slovenia) 2026	Group stage	3	1	0	2	8	11
Total	Quarter-finals	21	3	3	15	44	79

=== Grand Prix de Futsal ===
Grand Prix de Futsal record
Year	Position	Pld	W	D	L	GF	GA
(Brazil) 2007	Sixth place	6	2	2	2	16	17

=== Mediterranean Cup ===
Mediterranean Cup record
Year	Position	Pld	W	D	L	GF	GA
(Libya) 2010	Third place	6	5	0	1	32	12
