= Kristjan Čujec =

Slovenian futsal player (born 1988)

Personal information
- Date of birth: 30 November 1988 (age 37)
- Place of birth: Šempeter pri Gorici, SFR Yugoslavia
- Position: Forward

Senior career*
Years	Team	Apps	(Gls)
2005–2011	Puntar		
2011–2012	Caja Segovia		
2012	Ribera Navarra		
2012–2013	PesaroFanu		
2013–2014	A.S.D. New Team C/5		
2014	→ Araz Naxçivan (loan)		
2014–2015	Asti Calcio a 5		
2015	Luparense		
2015–2017	Nacional Zagreb		
2017–2023	Dobovec		
2023–2024	Oplast Kobarid		

International career
2006–2010	Slovenia U21	25	(19)
2007–2022	Slovenia	128	(75)
- * Club domestic league appearances and goals

Kristjan Čujec (born 30 November 1988) is a Slovenian retired futsal player who played as a forward.
