= Andrii Lysenko =

Ukrainian military journalist (born 1968)

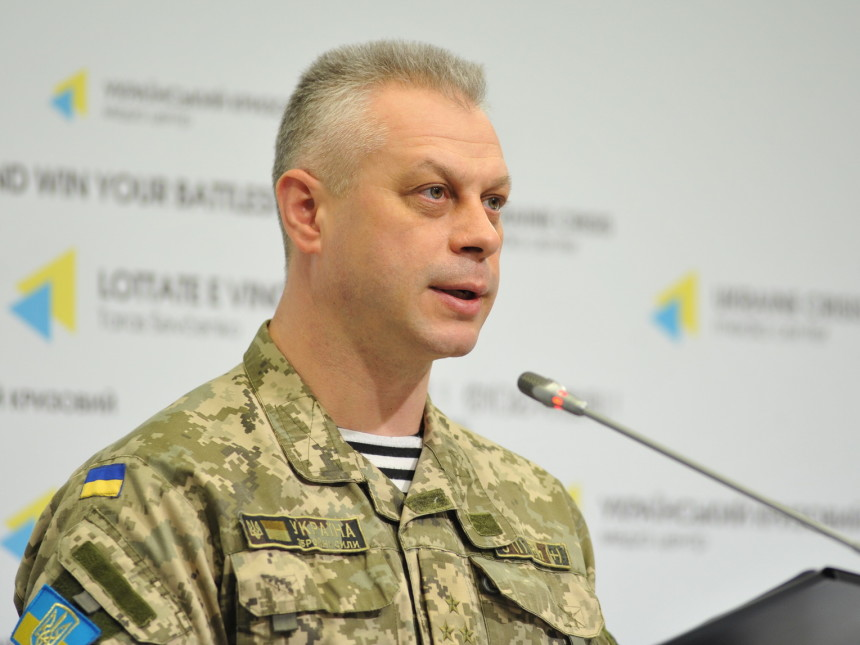
- Born: 4 November 1968 (age 57); Donetsk, Ukrainian SSR, Soviet Union
- Military career
- Allegiance: Ukraine
- Branch: Ukrainian Ground Forces
- Rank: Colonel
- Conflicts: Ukrainian peacekeeping mission in Iraq; Russo-Ukrainian War
- Awards: Honored Journalist of Ukraine

Andrii Mykolayovych Lysenko (Ukrainian: Андрій Миколайович Лисенко; born 4 November 1968) is a Ukrainian military journalist and Spokesman of the General Prosecutor's Office of Ukraine.

== Biography ==
From November 1986 to December 2007 he served in the army. In 2004, he worked as an officer of the press center of the 6th Mechanized Brigade in Kut, Iraq.

Spokesman of the Information and Analytical Center of the National Security and Defense Council of Ukraine (June - November 2014).

Spokesman of the General Prosecutor's Office of Ukraine (since December 2017).

== Awards and honors ==
- Honored Journalist of Ukraine (2004).
- Civil servant 5th rank (2013)
