= Kyrylo Tsypun =

Ukrainian futsal player

Personal information
- Full name: Kyrylo Tsypun
- Date of birth: 30 July 1987 (age 39)
- Place of birth: Soviet Union
- Position: Goalkeeper

Team information
- Current team: Prodexim Kherson

International career
Years	Team	Apps	(Gls)
- Ukraine
Medal record
Representing Ukraine
Men's Futsal
FIFA Futsal World Cup
Bronze medal – third place	2024 Uzbekistan

Kyrylo Tsypun (born 30 July 1987) is a Ukrainian futsal player who plays for Prodexim Kherson and the Ukraine national futsal team.
