= Zgornje Škofije =

Zgornje Škofije Scodalizzi
- Location in Slovenia
- Coordinates: 45°33′55.09″N 13°47′56.27″E
- Country: Slovenia
- Traditional region: Littoral
- Statistical region: Coastal–Karst
- Municipality: Koper

Area
  - Total: 1.78 km^{2} (0.69 sq mi)
- Elevation: 117.9 m (387 ft)

Population (2002)
  - Total: 745

Zgornje Škofije (pronounced [ˈzɡoːɾnjɛ ʃkɔˈfiːjɛ]; Italian: Scodalizzi) is a village in the City Municipality of Koper in the Littoral region of Slovenia. The settlement is made up of the hamlets of Druga Škofija, Tretja Škofija (a.k.a. Pri Lenartu), Četrta Škofija (a.k.a. Pri Čiču), and Rombi, in increasing elevation.

== Name ==
The name Zgornje Škofije literally means 'upper Škofije' (in contrast to neighboring Spodnje Škofije; literally, 'lower Škofije'). Zgornje Škofije is a plural name referring to the hamlets of Druga Škofija 'second Škofija', Tretja Škofija 'third Škofija', and Četrta Škofija 'fourth Škofija'. The neighboring settlement of Spodnje Škofije is also known locally as Prva Škofija 'first Škofija'. The name Škofija (literally, 'diocese') is derived from the common noun škof 'bishop', and the numbering refers to tenant farms originally owned by the Diocese of Koper.

== Church ==
The local church is dedicated to Christ the King and belongs to the Parish of Škofije.
