= Red Dragons Pniewy =

Polish futsal club

- Full name: Red Dragons Pniewy
- Nickname(s): Smoki (The Dragons)
- Founded: 2005; 20 years ago
- Ground: OSiR Pniewy
- Capacity: 420
- Chairman: Bartosz Barański
- Manager: Łukasz Frajtag
- League: Ekstraklasa
- 2024–25: Ekstraklasa, 13th of 16
- Website: http://futsalpniewy.pl
Home colours	Away colours

Red Dragons Pniewy is a Polish futsal club, based in Pniewy. They currently compete in the Ekstraklasa.

== Current squad ==
As of 4 February 2025

Note: Flags indicate national team as defined under FIFA eligibility rules; some limited exceptions apply. Players may hold more than one non-FIFA nationality.

No.	Pos.	Nation	Player
3	Defender	(Spain) ESP	Alvaro Caminero
4	Goalkeeper	(Poland) POL	Łukasz Błaszczyk
5	Winger	(Poland) POL	Oliwier Berger
6	Winger	(Poland) POL	Nikodem Krajewski
7	Winger	(Poland) POL	Aleksander Kozak
8	Defender	(Poland) POL	Hubert Klatkiewicz
9	Pivot	(Poland) POL	Mateusz Kostecki
11	Pivot	(Poland) POL	Jakub Durkiewicz
12	Winger	(Poland) POL	Bruno Kagmierski
13	Defender	(Poland) POL	Patryk Hoły
14	Pivot	(Brazil) BRA	Ramon Tubau
15	Winger	(Poland) POL	Oliwier Siuda
18	Defender	(Poland) POL	Igor Pietryka
19	Goalkeeper	(Poland) POL	Marcin Małycha
21	Winger	(Poland) POL	Bartłomiej Gładyszewski
23	Pivot	(Poland) POL	Piotr Błaszyk
26	Defender	(Portugal) POR	Sandro Rodrigues
30	Goalkeeper	(Poland) POL	Szymon Jokiel
98	Winger	(Brazil) BRA	Claudio Junior

== Honours ==
- I liga North
  - Champions: 2013–14
- Polish Cup
  - Winners: 2020–21
- Polish Super Cup
  - Winners: 2021
