= Alen Fetić =

Slovenian futsal player (born 1991)

Personal information
- Date of birth: 14 October 1991 (age 35)
- Place of birth: Ljubljana, Slovenia
- Position: Forward

Team information
- Current team: HMNK Rijeka

Youth career
- Olimpija
- Svoboda

Senior career*
Years	Team	Apps	(Gls)
- Viktorbit
2011–2012	Litija		
2013	Novo Vrijeme Makarska		
2013	Ekonomac		
2014	Novo Vrijeme Makarska		
2014–2015	Split		
2016–2017	Brezje Maribor		
2017–2018	Litija		
2018–2020	Dobovec		
2020–2021	Acqua e Sapone		
2021–2022	Petrarca		
2022–	HMNK Rijeka		

International career
2010–2011	Slovenia U21	11	(2)
2010–2022	Slovenia	122	(48)
- * Club domestic league appearances and goals

Alen Fetić (born 14 October 1991) is a Slovenian futsal player who plays for Croatian club HMNK Rijeka.
