= Igor Osredkar =

Slovenian futsal player (born 1986)

Personal information
- Date of birth: 28 June 1986 (age 40)
- Position: Defender

Team information
- Current team: Bubamara Cazin

Senior career*
Years	Team	Apps	(Gls)
2003–2008	Litija		
2008–2009	Gorica		
2009–2013	Litija		
2013–2015	Novo Vrijeme Makarska		
2015–2016	Nacional Zagreb		
2016–2021	Novo Vrijeme Makarska		
2021–2022	Litija		
2022–2023	Futsal Pula		
2023–	Bubamara Cazin		

International career^{‡}
2005–	Slovenia	200	(92)
- * Club domestic league appearances and goals ‡ National team caps and goals as of 17 October 2025

Igor Osredkar (born 28 June 1986) is a Slovenian futsal player who plays for Bubamara Cazin and the Slovenia national futsal team.
