= Rok Mordej =

Slovenian futsal player (born 1989)

Personal information
- Date of birth: 3 March 1989 (age 37)
- Position: Defender

Team information
- Current team: Dobovec (head coach)

Senior career*
Years	Team	Apps	(Gls)
2009–2012	Dobovec		
2012–2014	New Team Calcio a 5		
2014–2016	Dobovec		
2016–2017	Nacional Zagreb		
2017–2023	Dobovec		

International career
2006–2010	Slovenia U21	33	(11)
2008–2020	Slovenia	106	(41)

Managerial career
- 2024–: Dobovec
- * Club domestic league appearances and goals

Rok Mordej (born 3 March 1989) is a retired Slovenian futsal player.
