= KMN Sevnica =

Sevnica
- Full name: Klub malega nogometa Sevnica
- Founded: 1996; 30 years ago
- Ground: OŠ Savo Kladnik Sports Hall
- Capacity: 800
- President: Danijel Lindič
- Head coach: Dejan Pirc
- League: Slovenian First League
- 2025–26: Regular season: 3rd of 11; Playoffs: Quarter-final
- Website: kmn-sevnica.si
Home colours

Klub malega nogometa Sevnica (English: Sevnica Futsal Club), commonly referred to as KMN Sevnica, is a futsal club from Sevnica, Slovenia.

== Honours ==
- Slovenian Championship

Winners: 1997–98

- Slovenian Second Division

Winners: 2003–04, 2006–07, 2021–22
