= KMN Puntar =

Puntar
- Full name: Klub malega nogometa Puntar Kneža
- Nickname(s): Puntarji (The Rebels)
- Founded: 25 May 1974; 50 years ago
- Dissolved: 2019; 6 years ago
- Ground: Tolmin Sports Hall
- Capacity: 1,000
Home colours	Away colours

Klub malega nogometa Puntar (English: Puntar Futsal Club), commonly referred to as KMN Puntar or simply Puntar, was a futsal club from Tolmin, Slovenia. The club was founded in 1974.

== Honours ==
- Slovenian League
  - Winners (2): 2006–07, 2008–09
- Slovenian Cup
  - Winners (3): 2003–04, 2006–07, 2007–08
- Slovenian Supercup
  - Winners (2): 2008, 2009
