= FK Dobovec =

Dobovec
- Full name: Futsal klub Dobovec
- Founded: April 1978; 48 years ago (as KMN Dobovec)
- Ground: II. Osnovna šola Ratanska vas
- Capacity: 400
- President: Rok Mordej
- Head coach: Rok Mordej
- League: Slovenian First League
- 2025–26: Regular season: 2nd of 11; Playoffs: Runners-up
- Website: fkdobovec.si
Home colours	Away colours

Futsal klub Dobovec or simply FK Dobovec is a futsal club from Rogatec, Slovenia. They have won the Slovenian Championship seven times, most recently in 2024.

== History ==
The club was founded in April 1978 as KMN Dobovec, and played in amateur regional tournaments until 1995. In the 2000–01 season, the club was promoted to Slovenia's top division, the Slovenian Futsal League. In the 2014–15 season, Dobovec won their first national championship after defeating KMN Kobarid in the final.

== Honours ==
- Slovenian Championship
  - Winners (7): 2014–15, 2017–18, 2018–19, 2020–21, 2021–22, 2022–23, 2023–24
- Slovenian Cup
  - Winners (9): 2017–18, 2018–19, 2019–20, 2020–21, 2021–22, 2022–23, 2023–24, 2024–25, 2025–26
- Slovenian Supercup
  - Winners (3): 2015, 2018, 2026

== UEFA club competitions record ==
All results list Dobovec's goal tally first.

Season	Competition	Round	Opponent	Result
2015–16	UEFA Futsal Cup	Main round	(Bulgaria) Grand Pro Varna	7–2
2015–16	UEFA Futsal Cup	Main round	(Bosnia and Herzegovina) Centar Sarajevo	5–2
2015–16	UEFA Futsal Cup	Main round	(Portugal) Benfica	1–6
2015–16	UEFA Futsal Cup	Elite round	(Spain) Inter FS	0–8
2015–16	UEFA Futsal Cup	Elite round	(Belarus) LSM Lida	2–7
2015–16	UEFA Futsal Cup	Elite round	(France) Kremlin-Bicêtre United	2–1
2018–19	UEFA Futsal Champions League	Main round	(Russia) Sibiryak	3–0
2018–19	UEFA Futsal Champions League	Main round	(Hungary) Berettyóújfalu	6–2
2018–19	UEFA Futsal Champions League	Main round	(Russia) Gazprom-Ugra Yugorsk	0–2
2018–19	UEFA Futsal Champions League	Elite round	(Spain) Inter FS	1–5
2018–19	UEFA Futsal Champions League	Elite round	(Lithuania) Vytis	2–1
2018–19	UEFA Futsal Champions League	Elite round	(Belgium) Halle-Gooik	5–4
2019–20	UEFA Futsal Champions League	Main round	(Serbia) Ekonomac	4–0
2019–20	UEFA Futsal Champions League	Main round	(Bosnia and Herzegovina) Mostar	7–2
2019–20	UEFA Futsal Champions League	Main round	(Portugal) Sporting CP	0–3
2019–20	UEFA Futsal Champions League	Elite round	(Belgium) Halle-Gooik	3–1
2019–20	UEFA Futsal Champions League	Elite round	(Bosnia and Herzegovina) Mostar	6–1
2019–20	UEFA Futsal Champions League	Elite round	(Russia) KPRF	2–5
2020–21	UEFA Futsal Champions League	Round of 32	(Malta) Luxol St Andrews	3–2
2020–21	UEFA Futsal Champions League	Round of 16	(Kazakhstan) Aktobe	2–1
2020–21	UEFA Futsal Champions League	Quarter-finals	(Spain) Barcelona	0–2
2021–22	UEFA Futsal Champions League	Main round	(Kazakhstan) Atyrau	2–1
2021–22	UEFA Futsal Champions League	Main round	(France) ACCS	4–5
2021–22	UEFA Futsal Champions League	Main round	(Portugal) Sporting CP	1–6
2021–22	UEFA Futsal Champions League	Elite round	(Spain) Barcelona	2–8
2021–22	UEFA Futsal Champions League	Elite round	(Czech Republic) Plzeň	3–2
2021–22	UEFA Futsal Champions League	Elite round	(Belgium) Halle-Gooik	1–4
2022–23	UEFA Futsal Champions League	Main round	(Malta) Luxol St Andrews	1–1
2022–23	UEFA Futsal Champions League	Main round	(Spain) Barcelona	0–8
2022–23	UEFA Futsal Champions League	Main round	(Netherlands) Hovocubo	3–0
2022–23	UEFA Futsal Champions League	Elite round	(Spain) Palma Futsal	2–8
2022–23	UEFA Futsal Champions League	Elite round	(Croatia) Novo Vrijeme	1–1
2022–23	UEFA Futsal Champions League	Elite round	(Poland) Piast Gliwice	2–6
2023–24	UEFA Futsal Champions League	Main round	(Romania) United Galați	3–3
2023–24	UEFA Futsal Champions League	Main round	(France) Étoile Lavalloise	0–4
2023–24	UEFA Futsal Champions League	Main round	(Portugal) Benfica	1–8
2023–24	UEFA Futsal Champions League	Elite round	(Portugal) Benfica	3–4
2023–24	UEFA Futsal Champions League	Elite round	(Kosovo) FC Prishtina 01	3–3
2023–24	UEFA Futsal Champions League	Elite round	(Kazakhstan) Kairat	0–7
2024–25	UEFA Futsal Champions League	Main round	(Romania) United Galați	1–3
2024–25	UEFA Futsal Champions League	Main round	(Croatia) Futsal Dinamo	2–2
2024–25	UEFA Futsal Champions League	Main round	(Spain) Palma Futsal	1–5
