= KMN Oplast Kobarid =

Oplast Kobarid
- Full name: Klub malega nogometa Oplast Kobarid
- Founded: 2002; 24 years ago
- Ground: Kobarid Sports Hall
- Capacity: 500
- Head coaches: Primož Zorč and Jaka Sovdat
- League: Slovenian First League
- 2025–26: Regular season: 6th of 11; Playoffs: Fourth place
- Website: oplast-futsal.si
Home colours

Klub malega nogometa Oplast Kobarid (English: Oplast Kobarid Futsal Club), commonly referred to as KMN Oplast Kobarid, is a futsal club from Kobarid, Slovenia.

== Honours ==
- Slovenian Championship
  - Winners (2): 2009–10, 2013–14
- Slovenian Cup
  - Winners (3): 2004–05, 2005–06, 2014–15
- Slovenian Supercup
  - Winners (1): 2014
