= FC Litija =

- Full name: Klub malega nogometa FC Litija
- Founded: 24 December 1982; 43 years ago
- Dissolved: 9 May 2022; 3 years ago
- Ground: Litija Sports Hall
- Capacity: 1,500
Home colours	Away colours

FC Litija was a futsal club from Litija, Slovenia. Founded in 1982, it has won the Slovenian Futsal League a record ten times.

== Honours ==
- Slovenian Championship
  - Winners (10): 1996–97, 1998–99, 2000–01, 2001–02, 2002–03, 2003–04, 2004–05, 2010–11, 2011–12, 2012–13
- Slovenian Cup
  - Winners (9): 1995–96, 1998–99, 1999–2000, 2001–02, 2002–03, 2009–10, 2010–11, 2011–12, 2013–14
- Slovenian Supercup
  - Winners (10): 2000, 2004, 2005, 2010, 2012, 2013, 2016, 2017, 2020, 2021
