= List of CONCACAF competitions =

This is a list of current and defunct international CONCACAF competitions, categorized according to their geographical scope. Including intercontinental, continental and regional competitions organized or recognized by CONCACAF for men's and women's national teams and clubs in all their categories. Also listed are all domestic leagues and cup tournaments organized by each of its member associations.

== Intercontinental competitions ==
=== Defunct competitions ===
Competition	Organizer	Ed.	Est.	Abol.	Last champions
Men's clubs
Copa Interamericana	CONCACAF; CONMEBOL	18	1969	1998	(United States) D.C. United

== Continental competitions ==
=== Active competitions ===
Competition	Ed.	Est.	Title holders	Season
Men's national teams
CONCACAF Gold Cup	18	1991	Mexico	2025
CONCACAF Nations League	4	2018	Mexico	2024–25
Men's youth national teams
CONCACAF Under-20 Championship	30	1962	Mexico	2026
CONCACAF Under-17 World Cup Qualification	22	1983	— (Note: Starting with the 2025 edition, the champions and runners-up are not awarded, only qualified teams for the Under-17 World Cup.)	2026
CONCACAF Boys' Under-15 Championship	5	2013	Mexico	2025 League A
CONCACAF Boys' Under-15 Championship	5	2013	Jamaica	2025 League B
CONCACAF Boys' Under-15 Championship	5	2013	Suriname	2025 League C
Women's national teams
CONCACAF W Gold Cup	1	2024	United States	2024
CONCACAF W Championship	11	1991	United States	2022
Women's youth national teams
CONCACAF Women's Under-20 Championship	13	2002	Canada	2025
CONCACAF Under-17 Women's World Cup Qualification	10	2008	—	2026
CONCACAF Girls' Under-15 Championship	5	2014	United States	2024 League A
CONCACAF Girls' Under-15 Championship	5	2014	Honduras	2024 League B
CONCACAF Girls' Under-15 Championship	5	2014	Aruba	2024 League C
Men's clubs
CONCACAF Champions Cup	60	1962	(Mexico) Toluca	2026
Women's clubs
CONCACAF W Champions Cup	2	2024	(Mexico) América	2025–26
Futsal national teams
CONCACAF Futsal Championship	8	1996	Panama	2024
CONCACAF W Futsal Championship	1	2025	Canada	2025
Beach soccer national teams
CONCACAF Beach Soccer Championship	11	2006	El Salvador	2025

=== Defunct competitions ===
Competition	Ed.	Est.	Abol.ws	Last champions
Men's national teams
CONCACAF Championship	10	1963	1989	Costa Rica
CONCACAF Cup	1	2015		Mexico
Men's U-23 / Olympic teams
CONCACAF Men's Olympic Qualifying Championship	15	1964	2020	Mexico
Women's national teams
CONCACAF Women's Olympic Qualifying Tournament	5	2004	2020	United States
Men's clubs
CONCACAF League	6	2017	2022	(Honduras) Olimpia
CONCACAF Cup Winners Cup	4	1991	1995	(El Salvador) Atlético Marte
CONCACAF Giants Cup	1	2001		(Mexico) América
Men's youth clubs
CONCACAF Under-13 Champions League	5	2015	2019	(United States) Philadelphia Union

== Regional competitions ==
=== Active competitions ===
Competition	Organizer	Region	Ed.	Est.	Title holders	Season
Men's clubs
Leagues Cup (Note: Although the competition is not directly organized by CONCACAF, it has been officially recognized by the confederation since the 2023 edition. It is also recognized by the USSF and the FMF.)	MLS; Liga MX	North American Zone	6	2019; 2023 (Note: Established in 2019 and recognized by CONCACAF since 2023.)	(Mexico) Toluca	2026
CONCACAF Central American Cup	CONCACAF	Central American Zone	3	2023	(Costa Rica) Alajuelense	2025
CONCACAF Caribbean Cup	CONCACAF	Caribbean Zone	3	2023	(Jamaica) Mount Pleasant	2025
CFU Club Shield (Note: Formerly known as CONCACAF Caribbean Club Shield (2018–2023). Although the competition is not directly organized by CONCACAF since 2024, it is officially recognized by the confederation.)	CFU (2024–present); CONCACAF (2018–2023)	Caribbean Zone	7	2018	(Jamaica) Mount Pleasant	2026

== Domestic cups ==
National association	National cup
Anguilla	AFA Knockout Cup
Antigua and Barbuda	Antigua and Barbuda FA Cup
Aruba	Torneo Copa Betico Croes
(The Bahamas) Bahamas	Bahamas President's Cup
Barbados	Barbados FA Cup
Belize	No competition
Bermuda	Bermuda FA Cup
Bonaire	No competition
British Virgin Islands	Terry Evans Knockout Cup; Wendol Williams Cup
Canada	Canadian Championship
Cayman Islands	Cayman Islands FA Cup
Costa Rica	No competition
Cuba	No competition
Curaçao	No competition
Dominica	Champions Cup
Dominican Republic	Copa Dominicana de Fútbol
El Salvador	Copa El Salvador
French Guiana	Coupe de Guyane
Grenada	GFA Super Knockout Cup
Guadeloupe	Coupe de Guadeloupe
Guatemala	Copa de Guatemala
Guyana	GFF Super 8 Cup; Georgetown Regional Cup
Haiti	Coupe d'Haïti
Honduras	Honduran Cup
Jamaica	JFF Champions Cup
Martinique	No competition
Mexico	Copa MX
Montserrat	No competition
Nicaragua	No competition
Panama	No competition
Puerto Rico	Copa Luis Villarejo
Saint Kitts and Nevis	Saint Kitts and Nevis National Cup
Saint Lucia	SLFA President's Cup
(Collectivity of Saint Martin) Saint Martin	Coupe des Îles du Nord
Saint Vincent and the Grenadines	No competition
Sint Maarten	No competition
Suriname	Surinamese Cup; Suriname President's Cup
Trinidad and Tobago	Trinidad and Tobago FA Trophy
Turks and Caicos Islands	Turks and Caicos FA Cup
United States	U.S. Open Cup
(United States Virgin Islands) U.S. Virgin Islands	No competition

== Domestic leagues ==
Country	First division	Second division	Other
Anguilla	AFA Senior Male League		
Antigua and Barbuda	Antigua and Barbuda Premier Division	Antigua and Barbuda First Division	Antigua and Barbuda Regional Division
Aruba	Aruban Division di Honor	Aruban Division Uno	Aruban Division Dos
(The Bahamas) Bahamas	BFA Senior League	Grand Bahama Football League; New Providence Football League	
Barbados	Barbados Premier League	Barbados Division One	Barbados Division Two
Belize	Premier League of Belize		
Bermuda	Bermudian Premier Division	Bermuda First Division	
Bonaire	Bonaire League		
British Virgin Islands	BVIFA National Football League	Tortola League; Virgin Gorda League	
Canada	Canadian Premier League		League1 Alberta; League1 British Columbia; League1 Ontario; Ligue1 Québec
Cayman Islands	Cayman Islands Premier League	Cayman Islands First Division	
Costa Rica	Liga FPD	Segunda División de Costa Rica	Tercera Division de Costa Rica
Cuba	Campeonato Nacional de Fútbol de Cuba	Torneo de Ascenso	
Curaçao	Curaçao Sekshon Pagá		
Dominica	Dominica Premier League	Dominica First Division	
Dominican Republic	Liga Dominicana de Fútbol		
El Salvador	Salvadoran Primera División	Segunda División de El Salvador	Tercera Division de Fútbol Salvadoreño
French Guiana	French Guiana Honor Division	French Guiana Promotion of Honor	
Grenada	GFA Premier Division	GFA First Division	GFA Second Division
Guadeloupe	Guadeloupe Division of Honor	Honorary Promotion Championship	
Guatemala	Liga Nacional de Fútbol de Guatemala	Primera División de Ascenso	Segunda División de Ascenso
Guyana	GFF National Super League	Guyana FA Divisions	
Haiti	Championnat National D1	Championnat National D2	Championnat National D3
Honduras	Liga Nacional de Fútbol Profesional de Honduras	Honduran Liga Nacional de Ascenso	Honduran Liga Mayor
Jamaica	National Premier League	KSAFA Super League; Western Confederation Super League; Eastern Confederation Super League; South Central Confederation Super League	
Martinique	Martinique Championnat National	Martinique Promotion d'Honneur	
Mexico	Liga MX	Liga de Expansión MX	Liga Premier de México; Liga TDP
Montserrat	Montserrat Championship		
Nicaragua	Primera División de Nicaragua	Segunda División de Nicaragua	Tercera División de Nicaragua
Panama	Liga Panameña de Fútbol	Liga Nacional de Ascenso	Copa Rommel Fernández
Puerto Rico	Liga Puerto Rico		
(Saint Kitts and Nevis) St. Kitts and Nevis	SKNFA Super League	SKNFA Division 1	
(Saint Lucia) St. Lucia	SLFA First Division	SLFA Second Division	
(Collectivity of Saint Martin) St. Martin	Saint-Martin Senior League		
(Saint Vincent and the Grenadines) St. Vincent and the Grenadines	NLA Premier League	SVGFF First Division	
Sint Maarten	Sint Maarten Senior League		
Suriname	Suriname Major League	SVB Eerste Divisie	SVB Lidbondentoernooi
Trinidad and Tobago	TT Pro League		
Turks and Caicos Islands	Provo Premier League		
United States	Major League Soccer	USL Championship	USL League One; National Independent Soccer Association; USL League Two
(United States Virgin Islands) U.S. Virgin Islands	U.S. Virgin Islands Championship	St. Croix Soccer League; St. Thomas League	
