= 2017 CONCACAF Futsal Club Championship =

Campeonato de Futsal de Clubes Concacaf 2017

Tournament details
- Host country: Honduras
- City: Tegucigalpa
- Dates: 21–26 August 2017
- Teams: 8 (from 8 associations)
- Venue: 1 (in 1 host city)

Final positions
- Champions: (Costa Rica) Grupo Line Futsal (1st title)
- Runners-up: (United States) Elite Futsal
- Third place: (El Salvador) Soyapango
- Fourth place: (Cuba) Habana

Tournament statistics
- Matches played: 16
- Goals scored: 140 (8.75 per match)
- Top scorer: (Costa Rica) Juan Cordero (10 goals)

The 2017 CONCACAF Futsal Club Championship was the second edition of the CONCACAF Futsal Club Championship. It was played from 21 to 26 August 2017 at the Universidad Pedagógica Nacional Francisco Morazán in Tegucigalpa, Honduras.

== Teams ==
A total of eight teams, representing eight CONCACAF member associations, were invited to enter the competition.

Zone	Association	Team	Qualifying method	Appearance	Previous best performance
North America	Canada	Sporting Outlaws	2017 Canadian champions	1st	—
North America	Mexico	Sidekicks	2016–17 Mexican champions	2nd	3rd place (2014)
North America	(United States) United States	Elite Futsal	2017 U.S. champions	1st	—
Central America	(Costa Rica) Costa Rica	Grupo Line Futsal	2016 Costa Rican champions	1st	—
Central America	(El Salvador) El Salvador	Soyapango	2016 Salvadoran champions	1st	—
Central America	Honduras (hosts)	UPNFM	2016 Honduran champions	1st	—
Caribbean	Cuba	Habana	2016–17 Cuban champions	2nd	4th place (2014)
Caribbean	Guadeloupe	FAX Futsal	2016 Guadeloupean champions	1st	—

== Draw ==
The draw was held on 21 July 2017, 12:00 UTC−4, at the CONCACAF headquarters in Miami Beach, Florida. The eight teams were drawn into two groups of four. UPNFM (Honduras) were seeded into Group A as the host team, and Grupo Line Futsal (Costa Rica) were seeded into Group B as the team from the participating association with the best result in the previous edition in 2014. The remaining teams were drawn into the two groups, with the restriction that no more than two teams from the same zone could be drawn into the same group.

== Squads ==
Each team had to submit a squad of 12 players, including a minimum of two goalkeepers (Regulations XVI.).

== Group stage ==
The schedule of the tournament was announced on 24 July 2017.

The top two teams of each group advanced to the semi-finals. The teams were ranked according to points (3 points for a win, 1 point for a draw, 0 points for a loss). If tied on points, tiebreakers were applied in the following order (Regulations XXI. 5. 1.):

1. Results in head-to-head matches between tied teams (points, goal difference, goals scored);
2. Goal difference in all matches;
3. Goals scored in all matches;
4. Drawing of lots.

All times CST (UTC−6).

=== Group A ===
Pos	Team	Pld	W	D	L	GF	GA	GD	Pts	Qualification
1	(United States) Elite Futsal	3	3	0	0	19	4	+15	9	Knockout stage
2	(El Salvador) Soyapango	3	2	0	1	12	6	+6	6	Knockout stage
3	(Honduras) UPNFM (H)	3	1	0	2	12	11	+1	3	
4	(Guadeloupe) FAX Futsal	3	0	0	3	3	25	−22	0	

Source: CONCACAF
(H) Hosts
21 August 2017
15:00

Elite Futsal (United States)	2–0	(El Salvador) Soyapango
da Silva 15'; Mendes 30'	Report

Universidad Pedagógica Nacional Francisco Morazán, Tegucigalpa
Referee: Roberto Sánchez Álvarez (Cuba)
21 August 2017
20:00

UPNFM (Honduras)	7–0	(Guadeloupe) FAX Futsal
Pineda 7', 30'; Timinio 9'; Moncada 11'; Guzmán 19', 22'; Méndez 40'	Report

Universidad Pedagógica Nacional Francisco Morazán, Tegucigalpa
Referee: Ronny Castro Zumbado (Costa Rica)

22 August 2017
15:00

FAX Futsal (Guadeloupe)	1–12	(United States) Elite Futsal
Roth 36'	Report	Mendes 6', 39'; Alencar 17', 22', 40'; Oliveira 23', 24'; de Veiga 23'; da Silva 30', 33'; Moreira 34'; Renaud 39'

Universidad Pedagógica Nacional Francisco Morazán, Tegucigalpa
Referee: Víctor Prendas González (Costa Rica)
22 August 2017
20:00

UPNFM (Honduras)	2–6	(El Salvador) Soyapango
Recarte 1'; Timinio 13'	Report	García 1', 33', 35'; Contreras 3'; Sandoval 14', 29'

Universidad Pedagógica Nacional Francisco Morazán, Tegucigalpa
Referee: Francisco Rivera Llerenas (Mexico)

23 August 2017
15:00

Soyapango (El Salvador)	6–2	(Guadeloupe) FAX Futsal
Contreras 12'; Flores 14'; García 17', 26'; Sandoval 25'; Solís 30'	Report	Chaffort 13'; Zaire 22'

Universidad Pedagógica Nacional Francisco Morazán, Tegucigalpa
Referee: Ronny Castro Zumbado (Costa Rica)
23 August 2017
20:00

UPNFM (Honduras)	3–5	(United States) Elite Futsal
Guzmán 20' (pen.); Montes 23'; Méndez 30'	Report	Oliveira 5', 40'; Alencar 13'; Mendes 19'; de Veiga 22'

Universidad Pedagógica Nacional Francisco Morazán, Tegucigalpa
Referee: Francisco Rivera Llerenas (Mexico)

=== Group B ===
Pos	Team	Pld	W	D	L	GF	GA	GD	Pts	Qualification
1	(Costa Rica) Grupo Line Futsal	3	3	0	0	23	13	+10	9	Knockout stage
2	(Cuba) Habana	3	1	1	1	14	13	+1	4	Knockout stage
3	(Mexico) Sidekicks	3	1	0	2	19	23	−4	3	
4	(Canada) Sporting Outlaws	3	0	1	2	13	20	−7	1	

Source: CONCACAF
21 August 2017
12:30

Sidekicks (Mexico)	4–7	(Cuba) Habana
Sánchez 10'; M. Giorgana 19', 23'; Magaña 35'	Report	Baquero 15', 29'; Domínguez 21', 22'; Hernández 22'; Sánchez 25' (o.g.); Quesada 31'

Universidad Pedagógica Nacional Francisco Morazán, Tegucigalpa
Referee: Carlos González Sánchez (Guatemala)
21 August 2017
17:30

Grupo Line Futsal (Costa Rica)	8–3	(Canada) Sporting Outlaws
Zuñiga 6', 36'; Molina 15'; Cordero 25', 28', 30'; Paniagua 39' (pen.), 40'	Report	Laguel 9', 35'; Farsi 37'

Universidad Pedagógica Nacional Francisco Morazán, Tegucigalpa
Referee: Jorge Flores Hernández (El Salvador)

22 August 2017
12:30

Sporting Outlaws (Canada)	6–8	(Mexico) Sidekicks
Adair 18', 19'; Abzi 23', 30', 34', 36'	Report	Sánchez 2', 23', 37'; E. Giorgana 4', 17'; Juárez 29'; Magaña 38', 39'

Universidad Pedagógica Nacional Francisco Morazán, Tegucigalpa
Referee: Luis Aguilar (Panama)
22 August 2017
17:30

Habana (Cuba)	3–5	(Costa Rica) Grupo Line Futsal
Mariño 19'; Hernández 38'; Baquero 40' (pen.)	Report	Zuñiga 7'; Fonsea 9'; Paniagua 14', 37'; Mora 19'

Universidad Pedagógica Nacional Francisco Morazán, Tegucigalpa
Referee: Lance VanHaitsma (United States)

23 August 2017
12:30

Habana (Cuba)	4–4	(Canada) Sporting Outlaws
Quezada 11'; Mariño 17'; Baquero 25'; Peňa 36'	Report	Abzi 2', 21'; Michaud 35'; Laguel 37'

Universidad Pedagógica Nacional Francisco Morazán, Tegucigalpa
Referee: Jorge Flores Hernández (El Salvador)
23 August 2017
17:30

Grupo Line Futsal (Costa Rica)	10–7	(Mexico) Sidekicks
Cordero 6', 20', 24', 40'; Zuňiga 30', 40', 40'; Paniagua 34'; Tijerino 39'; Molina 39'	Report	M. Giorgana 1', 15'; E. Giorgana 3', 17', 19'; Magaňa 23'; Juárez 40' (pen.)

Universidad Pedagógica Nacional Francisco Morazán, Tegucigalpa
Referee: Carlos González Sánchez (Guatemala)

== Knockout stage ==
In the semi-finals, third place match and final, extra time and penalty shoot-out were used to decide the winner if necessary.

=== Bracket ===
Semi-finals
25 August
(Costa Rica) Grupo Line Futsal	3
(El Salvador) Soyapango	2
25 August
(United States) Elite Futsal	2
(Cuba) Habana	1

Final
26 August
(Costa Rica) Grupo Line Futsal	5
(United States) Elite Futsal	4
Third place
26 August
(El Salvador) Soyapango (p)	4 (5)
(Cuba) Habana	4 (4)

=== Semifinals ===
25 August 2017
16:30

Grupo Line Futsal (Costa Rica)	3–2	(El Salvador) Soyapango
Cordero 9', 22'; Zuñiga 18'	Report	Aguilar 36', 38' (pen.)

Universidad Pedagógica Nacional Francisco Morazán, Tegucigalpa
Referee: Roberto Sánchez Álvarez (Cuba)

25 August 2017
19:00

Elite Futsal (United States)	2–1	(Cuba) Habana
de Maria 4'; da Silva 13'	Report	Peña 40'

Universidad Pedagógica Nacional Francisco Morazán, Tegucigalpa
Referee: Carlos González Sánchez (Guatemala)

=== Third place match ===
26 August 2017
14:30

Soyapango (El Salvador)	4–4 (a.e.t.)	(Cuba) Habana
Flores 4'; Escalante 9'; Contreras 15'; Sandoval 26'	Report	Mariño 16', 36'; Baquero 17'; Quezada 34'
Penalties
Aguilar (penalty scored); Solís (penalty scored); Galán (penalty scored); García (penalty scored); Bonilla (penalty scored)	5–4	(penalty scored) Domínguez; (penalty scored) Baquero; (penalty scored) Ramírez; (penalty scored) Hernández; (penalty missed) Mariño

Universidad Pedagógica Nacional Francisco Morazán, Tegucigalpa
Referee: Luis Aguilar (Panama)

=== Final ===
26 August 2017
17:00

Grupo Line Futsal (Costa Rica)	5–4	(United States) Elite Futsal
Garro 13'; Paniagua 18'; Tijerino 25'; Jiménez 36'; Cordero 40'	Report	Mendes 1'; de Maria 18'; Moereira 20'; de Veiga 27'

Universidad Pedagógica Nacional Francisco Morazán, Tegucigalpa
Referee: Jorge Flores Hernández (El Salvador)

== Top goalscorers ==
Rank	Player	Team	Goals
1	(Costa Rica) Juan Cordero	(Costa Rica) Grupo Line Futsal	10
2	(Costa Rica) Diego Zuñiga	(Costa Rica) Grupo Line Futsal	7
3	(Canada) Diyaeddine Abzi	(Canada) Sporting Outlaws	6
3	(Costa Rica) Alejandro Paniagua	(Costa Rica) Grupo Line Futsal	6
5	(Cuba) Andy Baquero	(Cuba) Habana	5
5	(El Salvador) Josué García	(El Salvador) Soyapango	5
5	(Mexico) Eder Giorgana	(Mexico) Sidekicks	5
5	(United States) Thiago Mendes	(United States) Elite Futsal	5

Source: CONCACAF.com
