= Liga Premier Masculina de Futsal de Costa Rica =

Liga Premier de Fútsal
- Country: Costa Rica
- Confederation: CONCACAF
- Divisions: 2
- Number of clubs: 12
- Level on pyramid: 1
- Relegation to: Liga A de Fútsal
- Domestic cup(s): Costa Rica Futsal Cup
- International cup(s): CONCACAF Futsal Club Championship
- Current champions: Borussia Fútsal (2018)
- Current: 2019

The Liga Premier Masculina de Fútsal de Costa Rica, is the top league for Futsal in Costa Rica. The winning team obtains the participation right to the CONCACAF Futsal Club Championship.

== Champions ==
- 2009: Borussia Fútsal
- 2010: T-shirt Mundo Fútsal
- 2011: Barrio Peralta Fútsal
- 2012: Orotina Fútsal
- 2013: Borussia Fútsal
- 2014: Borussia Fútsal
- 2015: Borussia Fútsal
- 2016: Grupo Line
- 2017: Borussia Fútsal.
- 2018: Joma Extremos.
- 2019: Desamparados Borussia Futsal
- 2020: No hubo campeón
- 2021: Desamparados Borussia Futsal
- 2022: Desamparados Borussia Futsal
- 2023: Desamparados Borussia Futsal

== See also ==
- CONCACAF Futsal Club Championship
- Costa Rican Football Federation
- Costa Rica national futsal team
- Costa Rica Futsal Cup
