= CONCACAF =

International governing body for association football in North America

- Confederation of North, Central America and Caribbean Association Football

- Abbreviation: CONCACAF
- Predecessor: NAFC; CCCF
- Formation: September 18, 1961; 65 years ago
- Founded at: Mexico City, Mexico
- Type: Sports organization
- Headquarters: Miami, Florida, U.S.
- Coordinates: 25.773°N 80.138°W
- Region served: North America (the Caribbean, Central America, and Northern America); South America (The Guianas)
- Members: 41 member associations
- Official language: Dutch; English; French; Spanish
- President: Victor Montagliani
- Vice Presidents: Lyndon Cooper; Sergio Chuc; Nick Bontis
- General Secretary: Philippe Moggio
- Parent organization: FIFA
- Subsidiaries: NAFU (North America); UNCAF (Central America); CFU (Caribbean)
- Website: concacaf.com

The Confederation of North, Central America and Caribbean Association Football, (Note: Spanish: Confederación de Fútbol de Norte, Centroamérica y el Caribe [koɱfeðeɾaˈsjon de ˈfuðβol de ˈnoɾte ˌsentɾoaˈmeɾika j el kaˈɾiβe]; French: Confédération de football d'Amérique du Nord, d'Amérique centrale et des Caraïbes [kɔ̃fedeʁɑsjɔ̃ də futbol dameʁik dy nɔʁ dameʁik sɑ̃tʁal e de kaʁa.ib]. Dutch uses the English name.) abbreviated as CONCACAF (/ˈkɒŋkəkæf/ KONG-kə-kaf; typeset for branding purposes since 2018 as Concacaf), is one of FIFA's six continental governing bodies for association football. Its 41 member associations represent countries and territories mainly in North America, including the Caribbean and Central America, and, for cultural and historical reasons, three nations from the Guianas subregion of South America: Guyana, Suriname, and French Guiana (an overseas region of France). CONCACAF's primary functions are to organize competitions for national teams and clubs, and to conduct the World Cup and Women's World Cup qualifying tournaments.

CONCACAF was founded in its current form on September 18, 1961, in Mexico City, Mexico, with the merger of the NAFC and the CCCF, which made it one of the then five, now six, continental confederations affiliated with FIFA. Canada, Costa Rica, Cuba, El Salvador, Guatemala, Haiti, Honduras, Mexico, Netherlands Antilles (Curaçao, Aruba), Nicaragua, Panama, Suriname and the United States were founding members.

Mexico dominated CONCACAF men's competitions early on and has won the most Gold Cups. The Mexico national team is the only men's CONCACAF team to win an official FIFA tournament by winning the 1999 FIFA Confederations Cup. Mexico and the U.S. have won all but one of the editions of the CONCACAF Gold Cup. As of 2026, twelve CONCACAF countries have participated in the World Cup and four have advanced to at least the quarterfinals. The CONCACAF Nations League was established in 2018, with the United States winning the most editions with three.

The United States has been the most successful team in the world in the women's game, being the only CONCACAF member to win all three major worldwide competitions in women's football—the World Cup (4), the Olympics (5), and the Algarve Cup (10). Canada is the only other member to win at least two of the major competitions, winning the 2016 Algarve Cup and the 2020 Olympics.

== Governance ==
The CONCACAF is led by a general secretary, executive committee, congress, and several standing committees. The executive committee is composed of eight members — one president, three vice-presidents, three members, and one female member. Each of the three geographic zones in CONCACAF is represented by one vice-president and one member. The executive committee carries out the various statutes, regulations, and resolutions.Curacao is an associate member of Concacaf sponsored the Kingdom of the Netherlands Football Federation.

== Leadership ==
The first leader of CONCACAF was Costa Rican Ramón Coll Jaumet; he had overseen the merger between the North American Football Confederation (NAFC) and the Confederación Centroamericana y del Caribe de Fútbol (CCCF). In 1969, he was succeeded in the role by Mexican Joaquín Soria Terrazas, who served as president for 21 years.

His successor Jack Warner was the CONCACAF president from 1990 to 2011, also for 21 years. Warner was suspended as president on 30 May 2011 due to his temporary suspension from football-related activity by FIFA following corruption allegations. Chuck Blazer was the general secretary during the same period.

On 20 June 2011, Jack Warner resigned from the presidency of CONCACAF, and removed himself from all participation in football, in the wake of the corruption investigation resulting from 10 May 2011 meeting of the Caribbean Football Union. The vice-president of CONCACAF, Alfredo Hawit, acted as president until May 2012.

In May 2012, Cayman Islands banker Jeffrey Webb was installed as president of CONCACAF. On 27 May 2015, Webb was arrested in Zurich, Switzerland on corruption charges in the U.S.

Victor Montagliani, leader of the Canadian Soccer Association, was elected as president of CONCACAF in May 2016.

=== CONCACAF Council ===
Name	Nation	Position
Victor Montagliani	Canada	President
Philippe Moggio	France	General secretary
Randolph Harris	Barbados	Vice President (Caribbean)
Nick Bontis	Canada	Vice President (North America)
Sergio Chuc	Belize	Vice President (Central America)
Maurice Victoire	Martinique	Member (Caribbean)
Mikel Arriola	Mexico	Member (North America)
Jorge Salomon	Honduras	Member (Central America)

== Corporate structure ==
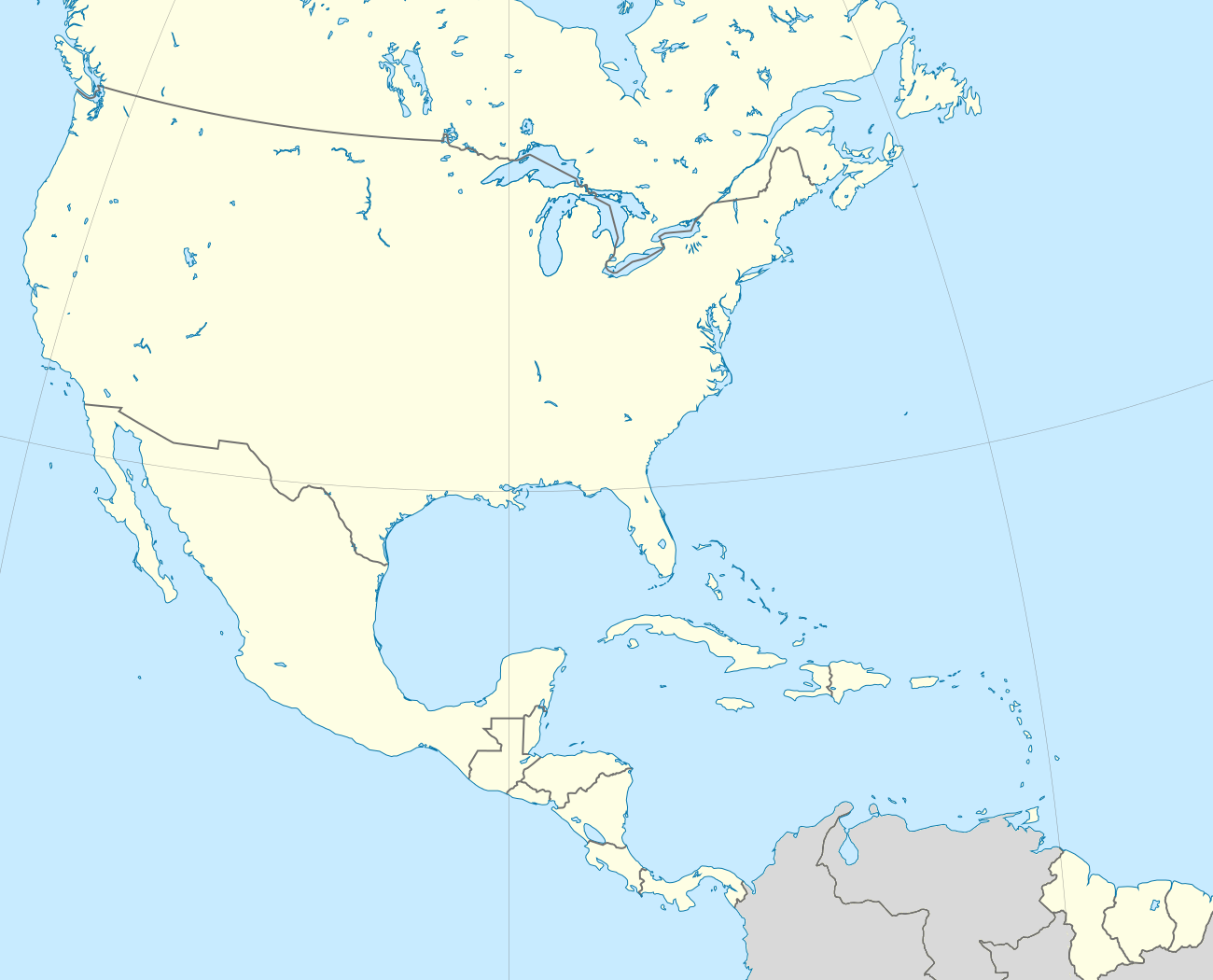
Locations of CONCACAF offices

CONCACAF is a non-profit company registered in Nassau, The Bahamas.

The headquarters of the CONCACAF are located in Miami, United States. Previously it had been the Admiral Financial Center, George Town, Cayman Islands—the home city of former CONCACAF president Jeffrey Webb and prior to that, they were based in Port of Spain, Trinidad and Tobago under the presidency of Jack Warner. The administration office of CONCACAF was previously located on the 17th floor at Trump Tower, New York, when Chuck Blazer was the general secretary.

In February 2017, a satellite office was opened in Kingston, Jamaica. In July 2017, a second satellite office was opened in Guatemala City, which is shared with the Central American Football Union (UNCAF), and most recently another satellite office for the FIFA Caribbean Development Office was opened in the suburb of Welches, in Bridgetown, Barbados.

=== Members ===
CONCACAF has 41 member associations:

Code	Association	National teams	Founded	FIFA affiliation	CONCACAF affiliation	IOC member
North American Zone (NAFU) (3)
CAN	Canada	(M, W)	1912	1913	1961	Yes
MEX	Mexico	(M, W)	1922	1929	1961	Yes
USA	United States	(M, W)	1913	1914	1961	Yes
Central American Zone (UNCAF) (7)
BLZ	Belize	(M, W)	1980	1986	1986	Yes
CRC	Costa Rica	(M, W)	1921	1927	1961	Yes
SLV	El Salvador	(M, W)	1935	1938	1961	Yes
GUA	Guatemala	(M, W)	1919	1946	1961	Yes
HON	Honduras	(M, W)	1935	1946	1961	Yes
NCA	Nicaragua	(M, W)	1931	1950	1961	Yes
PAN	Panama	(M, W)	1937	1938	1961	Yes
Caribbean Zone (CFU) (31)
AIA	Anguilla	(M, W)	1990	1996	1996	No
ATG	Antigua and Barbuda	(M, W)	1928	1972	1972	Yes
ARU	Aruba	(M, W)	1932	1988	1986	Yes
BAH	Bahamas	(M, W)	1967	1968	1981	Yes
BRB	Barbados	(M, W)	1910	1968	1967	Yes
BER	Bermuda	(M, W)	1928	1962	1967	Yes
BOE	Bonaire (Note: Full CONCACAF member, but not a FIFA member.)	(M, W)	1960	—N/a	2014	No
VGB	British Virgin Islands	(M, W)	1974	1996	1996	Yes
CAY	Cayman Islands	(M, W)	1966	1992	1990	Yes
CUB	Cuba	(M, W)	1924	1932	1961	Yes
CUW	Curaçao	(M, W)	1921	1932	1961	No
DMA	Dominica	(M, W)	1970	1994	1994	Yes
DOM	Dominican Republic	(M, W)	1953	1958	1964	Yes
GUF	French Guiana	(M, W)	1962	—N/a	2013	No
GRN	Grenada	(M, W)	1924	1978	1978	Yes
GLP	Guadeloupe	(M, W)	1958	—N/a	2013	No
GUY	Guyana	(M, W)	1902	1970	1961	Yes
HAI	Haiti	(M, W)	1904	1934	1961	Yes
JAM	Jamaica	(M, W)	1910	1962	1963	Yes
MTQ	Martinique	(M, W)	1953	—N/a	2013	No
MSR	Montserrat	(M, W)	1994	1996	1996	No
PUR	Puerto Rico	(M, W)	1940	1960	1964	Yes
SKN	Saint Kitts and Nevis	(M, W)	1932	1992	1992	Yes
LCA	Saint Lucia	(M, W)	1979	1988	1986	Yes
SMN	Saint Martin	(M, W)	1999	—N/a	2013	No
VIN	Saint Vincent and the Grenadines	(M, W)	1979	1988	1986	Yes
SMA	Sint Maarten	(M, W)	1986	—N/a	2013	No
SUR	Suriname	(M, W)	1920	1929	1961	Yes
TRI	Trinidad and Tobago	(M, W)	1908	1964	1964	Yes
TCA	Turks and Caicos Islands	(M, W)	1996	1998	1996	No
VIR	U.S. Virgin Islands	(M, W)	1992	1998	1987	Yes

M = Men's National Team. W = Women's National Team

Bonaire were promoted from an association member to a full member at the XXIX Ordinary CONCACAF Congress in São Paulo on 10 June 2014.

Teams not affiliated to the IOC are not eligible to participate in the Summer Olympics football tournament, as a result, they do not participate in the CONCACAF Men's Pre-Olympic Tournament or the CONCACAF Women's Pre-Olympic Tournament.

=== Aspiring future members ===
- Greenland — The Football Association of Greenland (KAK) announced in May 2022 that they had officially begun the process of becoming a member of CONCACAF and were expected to attend the body's next congress with observer status. Greenland was ineligible to apply to join UEFA, even with its political links with Denmark, due to UEFA applicants being required to apply as sovereign states. Kenneth Kleist was elected president of the KAK in October 2023. At that time, he announced the association's intentions to apply for full CONCACAF membership in 2024. He also stated that the association had been informed that it was "quite close to admission" to the confederation. On 28 May 2024, Greenland officially applied for full CONCACAF membership. However in June 2025, during its 28th Extraordinary Congress, CONCACAF president Victor Montagliani announced that Greenland's membership application had been unanimously rejected.
- Saint Barthélemy announced in 2019 that the Comité Territorial de Football de Saint-Barthélemy had begun the process of joining the Caribbean Football Union and CONCACAF for the first time.
- Saint Pierre and Miquelon announced in September 2019 that The Football Association of Saint Pierre and Miquelon was expected to build a suitable venue with the aim of becoming a member of CONCACAF in the near future.

=== Other potential future members ===
Although one of the three special municipalities of the Netherlands in the region is a member of CONCACAF (Bonaire), the other two are not:

- Saba has played at least six recorded international matches, all of which against neighboring Sint Eustatius.
- Sint Eustatius has played nine recorded international matches, three against CONCACAF members in the Caribbean Football Union and the remainder against neighboring Saba.

== Membership relation ==
Elections at the CONCACAF Congress are mandated with a one-member, one-vote rule. The North American Football Union is the smallest association union in the region with only three members, but its nations have strong commercial and marketing support from sponsors and they are the most populous nations in the region.

The Caribbean Football Union has the power to outvote NAFU and UNCAF with less than half of its membership. Consequently, there is a fractious relationship between members of CFU, UNCAF and NAFU. This provoked former Acting-President Alfredo Hawit to lobby for the CONCACAF Presidency to be rotated between the three unions in CONCACAF in 2011.

Trinidad's Jack Warner presided over CONCACAF for 21 years, and there was little that non-Caribbean nations could do to elect an alternative. Under Warner, the CFU members voted together as a unit with Warner acting as a party whip. It happened with such regularity that sports political commentators referred to the CFU votes as the "Caribbean bloc" vote. Warner rejected the idea in 1993 of merging several smaller nations' national teams into a Pan-Caribbean team. His reasoning was that the nations were more powerful politically when separate than when together. He commented that "being small is never a liability in this sport".

== Competitions ==
=== Current competitions ===
Competition	Type	Inaugural edition	Total editions
Men's national teams
CONCACAF Gold Cup	Continental	1991	18
CONCACAF Nations League	Continental	2019–20 (Note: Previously, the Qualifying phase took place between September 2018 and March 2019. Meanwhile, the Finals were postponed until June 2021 due to the COVID-19 pandemic.)	4
Men's youth national teams
CONCACAF Under-20 Championship	Continental	1962	30
CONCACAF Under-17 Qualifiers (Note: Between 1983 and 1994, the competition was contested by Under-16 national teams.)	Continental	1983	22
CONCACAF Boys' Under-15 Championship	Continental	2013	5
UNCAF FIFA Forward Under-19 Tournament	Regional	2018	4
UNCAF FIFA Forward Under-16 Tournament	Regional	2006	12
CFU Boys' Under-14 Challenge Series	Regional	2022	3
Women's national teams	Regional		
CONCACAF W Gold Cup	Continental	2024	1
CONCACAF W Championship	Continental	1991	11
CONCACAF W Nations League	Continental	2028	—
Women's youth national teams
CONCACAF Women's Under-20 Championship	Continental	2002	13
CONCACAF Women's Under-17 Qualifiers	Continental	2008	10
CONCACAF Girls' Under-15 Championship	Continental	2014	5
UNCAF FIFA Forward Women's Under-19 Tournament	Regional	2023	3
UNCAF FIFA Forward Women's Under-16 Tournament	Regional	2025	1
CFU Girls' Under-14 Challenge Series	Regional	2023	2
Men's clubs
CONCACAF Champions Cup	Continental	1962	61
Leagues Cup (Note: The competition is organized by the Major League Soccer and the Liga MX, and officially recognized by the USSF and the FMF. As of the 2023 edition, the competition is also officially recognized by CONCACAF, although it is not directly organized by the confederation.)	Regional	2023 (Note: Two editions had previously taken place (2019 and 2021); however, those editions are only recognized by the USSF and the FMF. As of the 2023 edition, the competition is recognized by CONCACAF.)	4
CONCACAF Central American Cup	Regional	2023	3
CONCACAF Caribbean Cup	Regional	2023	3
CFU Club Shield (Note: From 2018 to 2023, the competition was organized by CONCACAF and formerly known as CONCACAF Caribben Club Shield. As of the 2024 edition, it is organized by the CFU; however, the competition remains officially recognized by the confederation.)	Regional	2018	7
Women's clubs
CONCACAF W Champions Cup	Continental	2024–25	2
UNCAF Women's Interclub Championship	Regional	2016	9
Futsal national teams
CONCACAF Futsal Championship	Continental	1996	8
CONCACAF W Futsal Championship	Continental	2025	1
Beach soccer national teams
CONCACAF Beach Soccer Championship	Continental	2006 (Note: In 2005 and 2007, CONCACAF and CONMEBOL jointly organized the Beach Soccer Championship to serve as their qualifiers for the World Cup.)	11

=== Defunct competitions ===
Competition	Type	Inaugural edition	Abolished	Total editions
Men's national teams
CONCACAF Championship	Continental	1963	1989	10
CONCACAF Cup	Continental	2015	2017	1
North American Nations Cup	Regional	1990	1991	2
Copa Centroamericana	Regional	1991	2017	14
Caribbean Cup	Regional	1989	2017	19
CFU Championship	Regional	1978	1988	6
Men's Under-23 / Olympic teams
CONCACAF Men's Olympic Qualifying Championship	Continental	1964	2020	15
Men's youth national teams
CFU Under-19 Tournament	Regional	2010	2016	4
CFU Under-16 Tournament	Regional	2010	2016	4
Women's national teams
CONCACAF Women's Olympic Qualifying Championship	Continental	2004	2020	5
CFU Women's Caribbean Cup	Regional	2000	2018	3
Men's clubs
Copa Interamericana	Intercontinental	1969	1998	18
CONCACAF League	Continental	2017	2022	6
CONCACAF Cup Winners Cup	Continental	1991	1995	4
CONCACAF Giants Cup	Continental	2001		1
UNCAF Interclub Cup	Regional	1999	2007	9
Caribbean Club Championship	Regional	1997	2022	24
Men's youth clubs
CONCACAF Under-13 Champions League	Continental	2015	2019	5
UNCAF Under-17 Interclub Cup	Regional	2018	2024	5

=== Premier continental competitions ===
==== CONCACAF Gold Cup ====
The CONCACAF Gold Cup is the premier continental association football competition for men's national teams from North America. The competition has been held since 1991 and is currently contested by 16 participating teams.

==== CONCACAF Nations League ====
The CONCACAF Nations League is the secondary continental association football competition for men's national teams from North America. The competition has been held since 2019; however, the qualifying phase took place beforehand, between September 2018 and March 2019. It is contested by the 41 member associations of CONCACAF, divided into three leagues based on their performance in the previous edition. League A and League B are each contested by 16 teams, and League C is contested by 9 teams.

==== CONCACAF Champions Cup ====
The CONCACAF Champions Cup is the premier continental association football competition for men's clubs from North America. The competition has been held since 1962 and is currently contested by 27 participating clubs, including 18 from the North American Zone, 6 from the Central American Zone and 3 from the Caribbean Zone.

== Current title holders ==
Competition	Year	Champions	Title	Runners-up	Next edition
National teams (men)
Gold Cup	2025 (final)	Mexico	10th	United States	2027 (final)
Nations League	2024–25 (final)	Mexico	1st	Panama	2026–27 (final)
U-20 Championship	2026	Mexico	14th	United States	2028
U-17 Championship	2026	Mexico	9th	United States	2027
U-15 Championship	2025	Mexico	2nd	United States	2027
Futsal Championship	2024	Panama	1st	Cuba	2028
Beach Soccer Championship	2025	El Salvador	3rd	Guatemala	2027
National teams (women)
W Championship	2022 (final)	United States	9th	Canada	2026 (final)
W Gold Cup	2024 (final)	United States	1st	Brazil	2028 (final)
Women's U-20 Championship	2025	Canada	3rd	Mexico	2027
Women's U-17 Championship	2024	United States	6th	Mexico	2026
Girls' U-15 Championship	2024	United States	4th	Mexico	2026
W Futsal Championship	2025	Canada	1st	Panama	2029
Club teams (men)
Champions Cup	2026 (final)	(Mexico) Toluca	3rd	(Mexico) Tigres UANL	2027
Leagues Cup	2026 (final)	(Mexico) Toluca	1st	(Mexico) Monterrey	2027
Central American Cup	2025	(Costa Rica) Alajuelense	3rd	(Guatemala) Xelajú	2026
Caribbean Cup	2025	(Jamaica) Mount Pleasant	1st	(Dominican Republic) O&M FC	2026
Under-13 Champions League	2019	(United States) Philadelphia Union	1st	(El Salvador) ADFA Santa Ana	TBC
Futsal Club Championship	2017	(Costa Rica) Grupo Line Futsal	1st	(United States) Elite Futsal	TBC
Club teams (women)
W Champions Cup	2025–26	(Mexico) América	1st	(United States) Washington Spirit	2027

=== Titles by nation ===
Nation	Men					Women					Futsal		Beach	Total
Nation	Gold Cup	Nations League	U20	U17	U15	Championship	Gold Cup	U20	U17	U15	Men's	Women's	Men's	Total
United States	7	3	3	3	1	9	1	7	6	4	2	–	3	49
Mexico	13	1	15	9	2	–	–	2	1	–	–	–	4	47
Canada	2	–	2	–	–	2	–	2	1	1	–	1	–	11
Costa Rica	3	–	2	1	–	–	–	–	–	–	4	–	–	10
Honduras	1	–	2	–	1	–	–	–	–	–	–	–	–	4
El Salvador	–	–	1	–	–	–	–	–	–	–	–	–	3	4
Guatemala	1	–	–	–	–	–	–	–	–	–	1	–	–	2
Panama	–	–	–	–	–	–	–	–	–	–	1	–	1	2
Cuba	–	–	–	1	–	–	–	–	–	–	–	–	–	1
Haiti	1	–	–	–	–	–	–	–	–	–	–	–	–	1

=== CONMEBOL tournaments ===
The following CONMEBOL tournaments have had CONCACAF competitors:

==== National teams ====
- Copa América

==== Clubs ====
- Copa Libertadores – (1998–2017)
- Copa Sudamericana – (2005–2008)
- Copa Merconorte – (2000–2001) (defunct)

== CONCACAF club competition winners ==
=== Continental ===
==== By club ====
Club América is the most titled club in the continent with a record of 7 CONCACAF Champions Cup titles, a continental record of 2 Copa Interamericana titles and a record of 1 CONCACAF Giants Cup title, 10 titles overall.

Key

CCL	CONCACAF Champions Cup / CONCACAF Champions League
CWC	CONCACAF Cup Winners Cup / CONCACAF Giants Cup
CL	CONCACAF League
CI	Copa Interamericana

List of CONCACAF club competition winners
Club	Country	CCL	CWC	CL	CI	Total
América	Mexico	7	1	0	2	10
Cruz Azul	Mexico	7	0	0	0	7
Pachuca	Mexico	6	0	0	0	6
Monterrey	Mexico	5	1	0	0	6
Saprissa	Costa Rica	3	0	1	0	4
Pumas UNAM	Mexico	3	0	0	1	4
Olimpia	Honduras	2	0	2	0	4
Toluca	Mexico	3	0	0	0	3
Alajuelense	Costa Rica	2	0	1	0	3
Atlante	Mexico	2	0	0	0	2
Defence Force	Trinidad and Tobago	2	0	0	0	2
Guadalajara	Mexico	2	0	0	0	2
Transvaal	Suriname	2	0	0	0	2
Necaxa	Mexico	1	1	0	0	2
Comunicaciones	Guatemala	1	0	1	0	2
D.C. United	United States	1	0	0	1	2
Águila	El Salvador	1	0	0	0	1
Alianza	El Salvador	1	0	0	0	1
Atlético Español	Mexico	1	0	0	0	1
Cartaginés	Costa Rica	1	0	0	0	1
FAS	El Salvador	1	0	0	0	1
LA Galaxy	United States	1	0	0	0	1
León	Mexico	1	0	0	0	1
Municipal	Guatemala	1	0	0	0	1
Puebla	Mexico	1	0	0	0	1
Racing	Haiti	1	0	0	0	1
Seattle Sounders FC	United States	1	0	0	0	1
Tigres UANL	Mexico	1	0	0	0	1
Leones Negros UdeG	Mexico	1	0	0	0	1
Violette	Haiti	1	0	0	0	1
Atlético Marte	El Salvador	0	1	0	0	1
Tecos	Mexico	0	1	0	0	1
Herediano	Costa Rica	0	0	1	0	1

==== By country ====
The following table lists all the countries whose clubs have won at least one CONCACAF competition. Mexican clubs are the most successful, with a total of 48 titles. Mexican clubs hold a record number of wins in the CONCACAF Champions Cup/CONCACAF Champions League (41), the CONCACAF Cup Winners' Cup/CONCACAF Giants Cup (4) and Copa Interamericana (3). In second place, Costa Rican clubs have 9 titles, and they have the most victories in the CONCACAF League (3). In third place overall, Salvadorian and American clubs have secured 4 titles each.

Key

CCL	CONCACAF Champions Cup / CONCACAF Champions League
CWC	CONCACAF Cup Winners' Cup / CONCACAF Giants Cup
CL	CONCACAF League
CI	Copa Interamericana

List of CONCACAF club competition winners by country
Country	CCL	CWC	CL	CI	Total
Mexico	41	4	0	3	48
Costa Rica	6	0	3	0	9
El Salvador	3	1	0	0	4
United States	3	0	0	1	4
Honduras	2	0	2	0	4
Guatemala	2	0	1	0	3
Haiti	2	0	0	0	2
Trinidad and Tobago	2	0	0	0	2
Suriname	2	0	0	0	2

==== By region ====
Key

CCL	CONCACAF Champions Cup / CONCACAF Champions League
CWC	CONCACAF Cup Winners' Cup / CONCACAF Giants Cup
CL	CONCACAF League
CI	Copa Interamericana

List of CONCACAF club competition winners by region
Federation (Region)	CCL	CWC	CL	CI	Total
NAFU (North America)	44	4	0	4	52
UNCAF (Central America)	13	1	6	0	20
CFU (Caribbean)	6	0	0	0	6

=== Regional ===
The CONCACAF has also organized many regional-based competitions, which are mostly ran as qualifiers to the continental level competitions. There are three main regions that operates under the CONCACAF banner: the NAFU (North America), the UNCAF (Central America) and the CFU (Caribbeans), each of which runs their own competitions.

==== North America ====
Key

SL	SuperLiga
LC	Leagues Cup

List of North American club competition winners
Team	Country	SL	LC	Total
Morelia	Mexico	1	0	1
New England Revolution	United States	1	0	1
Pachuca	Mexico	1	0	1
Tigres UANL	Mexico	1	0	1
Columbus Crew	United States	0	1	1
Cruz Azul	Mexico	0	1	1
Inter Miami CF	United States	0	1	1
León	Mexico	0	1	1
Seattle Sounders FC	United States	0	1	1
Toluca	Mexico	0	1	1

List of North American club competition winners by country
Country	SL	LC	Total
Mexico	3	3	6
United States	1	3	4

==== Central America ====
Key

UIC	UNCAF Interclub Cup
CAC	Central American Cup

List of Central American club competition winners
Clubt	Country	UIC	CAC	Total
Alajuelense	Costa Rica	3	3	6
Saprissa	Costa Rica	5	0	5
Municipal	Guatemala	4	0	4
Aurora	Guatemala	2	0	2
Comunicaciones	Guatemala	2	0	2
Olimpia	Honduras	2	0	2
Real España	Honduras	2	0	2
Alianza	El Salvador	1	0	1
Broncos	Honduras	1	0	1
Motagua	Honduras	1	0	1
Platense	El Salvador	1	0	1
Puntarenas	Costa Rica	1	0	1

List of Central American club competition winners by country
Country	UIC	CAC	Total
Costa Rica	9	3	12
Guatemala	8	0	8
Honduras	6	0	6
El Salvador	2	0	2

==== Caribbean ====
Key

CCC	Caribbean Club Championship
CC	Caribbean Cup
CS	CFU Club Shield

List of Caribbean club competition winners
Club	Country	CCC	CC	CS	Total
Robinhood	Suriname	0	1	2	3
Central	Trinidad and Tobago	2	0	0	2
Harbour View	Jamaica	2	0	0	2
Joe Public	Trinidad and Tobago	2	0	0	2
Portmore United	Jamaica	2	0	0	2
Puerto Rico Islanders	Puerto Rico	2	0	0	2
W Connection	Trinidad and Tobago	2	0	0	2
Mount Pleasant	Jamaica	0	1	1	2
Atlético Pantoja	Dominican Republic	1	0	0	1
Caledonia AIA	Trinidad and Tobago	1	0	0	1
Cavaly	Haiti	1	0	0	1
Cibao	Dominican Republic	1	0	0	1
San Juan Jabloteh	Trinidad and Tobago	1	0	0	1
United Petrotrin	Trinidad and Tobago	1	0	0	1
Violette	Haiti	1	0	0	1
Cavalier	Jamaica	0	1	0	1
Arnett Gardens	Jamaica	0	0	1	1
Bayamón	Puerto Rico	0	0	1	1
Club Franciscain	Martinique	0	0	1	1
Moca	Dominican Republic	0	0	1	1

List of Caribbean club competition winners by country
Country	CCC	CC	CS	Total
Trinidad and Tobago	9	0	0	9
Jamaica	4	2	2	8
Dominican Republic	2	0	1	3
Puerto Rico	2	0	1	3
Suriname	0	1	2	3
Haiti	2	0	0	2
Martinique	0	0	1	1

== FIFA World Rankings ==
=== Overview ===
FIFA Men's Rankings (as of 18 November 2026)
CONCACAF*	FIFA	±	National Team	Points
1	13	▼3	Mexico	1723.64
2	16	Steady	United States	1713.56
3	25	▲2	Canada	1586.12
4	45	▲1	Panama	1481.68
5	55	▼1	Costa Rica	1440
6	67	▲2	Jamaica	1376.81
7	68	▼1	Honduras	1373.07
8	81	▼1	Curaçao	1300.27
9	86	▼2	Haiti	1272.82
10	97	▼2	Guatemala	1234.29
11	101	▲1	El Salvador	1212.4
12	104	▲1	Trinidad and Tobago	1201.63
13	128	Steady	Suriname	1137.7
14	132	▲5	Nicaragua	1108.33
15	136	▼1	Dominican Republic	1095.49
16	140	▲2	Guyana	1082.67
17	154	▼3	Saint Kitts and Nevis	1032.87
18	155	Steady	Puerto Rico	1031.43
19	162	▲1	Cuba	997.75
20	163	▲2	Saint Lucia	989.8
21	164	▼2	Antigua and Barbuda	989.77
22	165	▲1	Saint Vincent and the Grenadines	981.33
23	168	▲1	Grenada	968.96
24	171	Steady	Bermuda	944.13
25	174	Steady	Barbados	927.72
26	175	▼3	Montserrat	921.59
27	181	▼1	Belize	893.94
28	183	▲2	Aruba	889.53
29	184	▲2	Dominica	885.98
30	201	▼3	Cayman Islands	825
31	204	Steady	Turks and Caicos Islands	806.26
32	206	Steady	U.S. Virgin Islands	794.75
33	208	Steady	Bahamas	771.83
34	209	Steady	British Virgin Islands	752.75
35	210	Steady	Anguilla	736.67
*Local rankings based on FIFA ranking points

FIFA Women's Rankings (as of 20 October 2026)
CONCACAF*	FIFA	±	National Team	Points
1	2	Steady	United States	2042.38
2	9	Steady	Canada	1926.96
3	28	Steady	Mexico	1707.1
4	40	▲1	Jamaica	1558.19
5	41	▲2	Costa Rica	1523.57
6	48	▼1	Haiti	1488.98
7	54	▲2	Panama	1457.45
8	77	Steady	Puerto Rico	1294.95
9	78	Steady	El Salvador	1287.53
10	81	▲1	Trinidad and Tobago	1269.08
11	82	▲1	Guatemala	1267.25
12	91	Steady	Guyana	1217.37
13	92	▲1	Dominican Republic	1211.22
14	95	▲1	Nicaragua	1205.13
15	96	▲1	Cuba	1204.21
16	126	Steady	Honduras	1115.28
17	141	▼1	Suriname	1065.77
18	144	▼2	Bermuda	1053.17
19	151	▼1	Saint Kitts and Nevis	1026.93
20	160	Steady	Saint Vincent and the Grenadines	947.14
21	163	Steady	Barbados	924.87
22	164	Steady	Saint Lucia	923.18
23	168	Steady	Belize	903.05
24	170	Steady	Dominica	884.73
25	172	Steady	Grenada	878.19
26	181	▼1	Curaçao	821.91
27	182	Steady	Antigua and Barbuda	807.2
28	183	Steady	Aruba	801.27
29	185	Steady	U.S. Virgin Islands	790.28
30	186	Steady	Cayman Islands	777.07
31	192	Steady	Anguilla	681.6
32	193	Steady	Bahamas	665.71
33	196	Steady	Turks and Caicos Islands	627.14
*Local rankings based on FIFA ranking points

=== Historical leaders ===
Men's

Women's

==== Team of the year ====
Team ranking in the top four - Men's
Year	First	Second	Third	Fourth
2025	United States	Mexico	Canada	Panama
2024	United States	Mexico	Canada	Panama
2023	United States	Mexico	Panama	Canada
2022	United States	Mexico	Costa Rica	Canada
2021	United States	Mexico	Canada	Costa Rica
2020	Mexico	United States	Jamaica	Costa Rica
2019	Mexico	United States	Costa Rica	Jamaica
2018	Mexico	United States	Costa Rica	Jamaica
2017	Mexico	United States	Costa Rica	Jamaica
2016	Costa Rica	Mexico	United States	Panama
2015	Mexico	United States	Costa Rica	Trinidad and Tobago
2014	Costa Rica	Mexico	United States	Trinidad and Tobago
2013	United States	Mexico	Costa Rica	Panama
2012	Mexico	United States	Haiti	Panama
2011	Mexico	United States	Panama	Honduras
2010	United States	Mexico	Jamaica	Honduras
2009	United States	Mexico	Honduras	Costa Rica
2008	United States	Mexico	Honduras	Costa Rica
2007	Mexico	United States	Honduras	Canada
2006	Mexico	United States	Cuba	Honduras
2005	Mexico	United States	Costa Rica	Honduras
2004	Mexico	United States	Costa Rica	Jamaica
2003	Mexico	United States	Costa Rica	Jamaica
2002	Mexico	United States	Costa Rica	Honduras
2001	Mexico	United States	Honduras	Costa Rica
2000	Mexico	United States	Trinidad and Tobago	Honduras
1999	Mexico	United States	Jamaica	Trinidad and Tobago
1998	Mexico	United States	Jamaica	Trinidad and Tobago
1997	Mexico	United States	Jamaica	Costa Rica
1996	Mexico	United States	Jamaica	Canada
1995	Mexico	United States	Honduras	Jamaica
1994	Mexico	United States	Honduras	Canada
1993	Mexico	United States	Honduras	Costa Rica

Team ranking in the top four - Women's
Year	First	Second	Third	Fourth
2025	United States	Canada	Mexico	Jamaica
2024	United States	Canada	Mexico	Jamaica
2023	United States	Canada	Mexico	Jamaica
2022	United States	Canada	Mexico	Costa Rica
2021	United States	Canada	Mexico	Costa Rica
2020	United States	Canada	Mexico	Costa Rica
2019	United States	Canada	Mexico	Costa Rica
2018	United States	Canada	Mexico	Costa Rica
2017	United States	Canada	Mexico	Costa Rica
2016	United States	Canada	Mexico	Costa Rica
2015	United States	Canada	Mexico	Costa Rica
2014	United States	Canada	Mexico	Costa Rica
2013	United States	Canada	Mexico	Costa Rica
2012	United States	Canada	Mexico	Costa Rica
2011	United States	Canada	Mexico	Costa Rica
2010	United States	Canada	Mexico	Costa Rica
2009	United States	Canada	Mexico	Cuba
2008	United States	Canada	Mexico	Trinidad and Tobago
2007	United States	Canada	Mexico	Trinidad and Tobago
2006	United States	Canada	Mexico	Trinidad and Tobago
2005	United States	Canada	Mexico	Trinidad and Tobago
2004	United States	Canada	Mexico	Trinidad and Tobago
2003	United States	Canada	Mexico	Trinidad and Tobago

== Other rankings ==
=== Men's CONCACAF Ranking Index ===
The Ranking Index is calculated by CONCACAF.

Rank	Team	Pts	±
1	Mexico	2,112	Steady
2	United States	1,833	▲1
3	Canada	1,799	▼1
4	Panama	1,685	Steady
5	Costa Rica	1,624	Steady
6	Honduras	1,549	Steady
7	Jamaica	1,515	Steady
8	Haiti	1,452	Steady
9	Guatemala	1,436	Steady
10	Trinidad and Tobago	1,356	Steady
11	Curaçao	1,335	Steady
12	Suriname	1,289	Steady
13	Martinique	1,202	Steady
14	Guadeloupe	1,141	Steady
15	Nicaragua	1,141	Steady
16	El Salvador	1,127	Steady
17	Guyana	1,064	Steady
18	Dominican Republic	1,046	Steady
19	Cuba	1,014	Steady
20	French Guiana	950	Steady
21	Saint Vincent and the Grenadines	873	Steady

Rank	Team	Pts	±
22	Puerto Rico	865	Steady
23	Bermuda	835	Steady
24	Grenada	809	Steady
25	Saint Lucia	772	Steady
26	Saint Kitts and Nevis	770	Steady
27	Belize	735	Steady
28	Montserrat	720	Steady
29	Dominica	618	Steady
30	Sint Maarten	603	Steady
31	Saint Martin	584	Steady
32	Bonaire	554	Steady
33	Antigua and Barbuda	553	Steady
34	Barbados	547	Steady
35	Aruba	542	Steady
36	Cayman Islands	433	Steady
37	Bahamas	387	Steady
38	Turks and Caicos Islands	272	Steady
39	British Virgin Islands	160	Steady
40	Anguilla	149	Steady
41	U.S. Virgin Islands	116	Steady

Last updated 20 July 2026

=== Women's CONCACAF Ranking Index ===
The Ranking Index is calculated by CONCACAF.

Rank	Team	Pts	±
1	United States	6,642	Steady
2	Canada	4,929	Steady
3	Costa Rica	3,704	Steady
4	Mexico	3,342	▲1
5	Jamaica	3,177	▼1
6	Panama	2,351	Steady
7	Haiti	2,172	Steady
8	El Salvador	1,754	▲1
9	Trinidad and Tobago	1,644	▼1
10	Dominican Republic	1,595	▲2
11	Puerto Rico	1,380	▲6
12	Guyana	1,338	▼1
13	Cuba	1,334	▼3
14	Bermuda	1,222	▼1
15	Belize	1,075	▼1
16	Guatemala	1,028	▼1
17	Suriname	960	▼1
18	Nicaragua	877	Steady
19	Antigua and Barbuda	830	Steady
20	Curaçao	787	Steady
21	Honduras	731	Steady

Rank	Team	Pts	±
22	Aruba	723	Steady
23	Saint Kitts and Nevis	720	Steady
24	Martinique	700	Steady
25	Grenada	673	Steady
26	Barbados	617	Steady
27	Dominica	553	Steady
28	Saint Vincent and the Grenadines	544	Steady
29	Saint Lucia	501	Steady
30	U.S. Virgin Islands	476	Steady
31	Bonaire	420	▲6
32	Cayman Islands	383	▼1
33	Anguilla	363	▼1
34	Turks and Caicos Islands	271	▼1
35	Bahamas	152	▼1
36	Guadeloupe	129	▼1
37	British Virgin Islands	49	▼1
38	French Guiana	0	Steady
39	Montserrat	0	Steady
40	Sint Maarten	0	Steady
41	Saint Martin	0	Steady

Last updated 11 March 2024

=== CONCACAF Men's Club Rankings ===
On 16 May 2023, CONCACAF launched a club ranking index which will be used to seed teams in future club competitions. A league ranking index was also launched the same day.

==== Clubs ====
Top ten, last updated 17 August 2026.

Rank	Club	Points
1	(Mexico) Toluca	1,273
2	(Mexico) Cruz Azul	1,261
3	(Mexico) Tigres UANL	1,255
4	(United States) Los Angeles FC	1,250
5	(United States) Inter Miami CF	1,240
6	(Mexico) América	1,236
7	(United States) Nashville SC	1,233
8	(United States) Columbus Crew	1,220
9	(United States) Seattle Sounders FC	1,218
10	(Mexico) Guadalajara	1,214

==== Leagues ====
Top ten, last updated 17 August 2026.

Rank	League	Points
1	(Mexico) Liga MX	9,806
2	(United States) Major League Soccer	9,729
3	(Costa Rica) Liga FPD	9,334
4	(Honduras) Liga Hondubet	9,253
5	(Guatemala) Liga Guate	9,056
6	(Canada) Canadian Premier League	8,921
7	(Panama) Liga Panameña de Fútbol	8,903
8	(Nicaragua) Liga Primera	8,701
9	Primera División de El Salvador	8,687
10	Jamaica Premier League	8,435

=== CONCACAF Women’s Club Ranking ===
In June 2025, CONCACAF released a Women's Club Ranking (CWCR) in preparation for the draw of the 2025–26 CONCACAF W Champions Cup.

=== Beach Soccer National Team Rankings ===
Men's CONCACAF Ranking Index

Rankings are calculated by CONCACAF.

Top ten, last updated 17 March 2025.

Rank	Country	Points
1	United States	4,087
2	Mexico	4,024
3	Panama	3,715
4	El Salvador	3,455
5	Bahamas	1,833
6	Costa Rica	1,385
7	Guatemala	1,242
8	Trinidad and Tobago	1,117
9	Guadeloupe	660
10	Turks and Caicos Islands	376

Men's BSWW rankings

Rankings are calculated by Beach Soccer Worldwide (BSWW).

Top ten, last updated 19 January 2026.

CCF	BSWW	Country	Points
1	12	El Salvador	1,278
2	15	United States	938.25
3	19	Guatemala	776.5
4	28	Bahamas	472.5
5	31	Mexico	453.25
6	40	Costa Rica	275.5
7	57	Trinidad and Tobago	170
8	61	Panama	155
9	78	Belize	67.5
10	83	Turks and Caicos Islands	37.5

Women's BSWW rankings

Rankings are calculated by Beach Soccer Worldwide (BSWW).

Last updated 19 January 2026.

CCF	BSWW	Country	Points
1	8	United States	415.5
2	9	El Salvador	325
3	13	Bahamas	147.5
4	14	Trinidad and Tobago	115
5	15	Costa Rica	95
6	18	Mexico	60
7	20	Turks and Caicos Islands	20

== Major tournament records ==
Legend

- 1st – Champions
- 2nd – Runners-up
- 3rd – Third place (Note: There was no third place match in 1930; The United States and Yugoslavia lost in the semi-finals. FIFA recognizes the United States as the third-placed team and Yugoslavia as the fourth-placed team using the overall records of the teams in the 1930 FIFA World Cup.)
- 4th – Fourth place
- QF – Quarter-finals (1934–1938, 1954–1970, and 1986–present: knockout round of 8)
- R3 – Round 3 (2026–present: knockout round of 16)
- R2 – Round 2 (1974–1978: second group stage, top 8; 1982: second group stage, top 12; 1986–2022: knockout round of 16; 2026–present: knockout round of 32)
- R1 – Round 1 (1930, 1950–1970 and 1986–present: group stage; 1934–1938: knockout round of 16; 1974–1982: first group stage)
- •• — Qualified but withdrew
- • — Did not qualify
- — Did not enter / withdrew / banned
- — Hosts

For each tournament, the flag of the host country and the number of teams in each finals tournament (in brackets) are shown.

=== FIFA World Cup ===
Only twelve CONCACAF members have ever reached the FIFA World Cup since its inception in 1930, four of them accomplishing the feat only once. No team from the region has ever reached the final at the World Cup, but the United States reached the semi-finals in the inaugural edition, for which they were awarded third place. CONCACAF members have reached the quarter-finals five times: Cuba in 1938, Mexico as hosts in 1970 and 1986, the United States in 2002, and most recently, Costa Rica in 2014. Jamaica is the smallest country to ever win a World Cup match, by virtue of their 2–1 victory over Japan in 1998.

The following table shows the CONCACAF representatives at each edition of the World Cup, sorted by number of appearances:

FIFA World Cup record
Team	1930 (Uruguay) (13)	1934 (Italy) (16)	1938 (France) (15)	1950 (Brazil) (13)	1954 (Switzerland) (16)	1958 (Sweden) (16)	1962 (Chile) (16)	1966 (England) (16)	1970 (Mexico) (16)	1974 (West Germany) (16)	1978 (Argentina) (16)	1982 (Spain) (24)	1986 (Mexico) (24)	1990 (Italy) (24)	1994 (United States) (24)	1998 (France) (32)	2002 (Japan) (South Korea) (32)	2006 (Germany) (32)	2010 (South Africa) (32)	2014 (Brazil) (32)	2018 (Russia) (32)	2022 (Qatar) (32)	2026 (Canada) (Mexico) (United States) (48)	Years	inclusive WC Qual.
Canada						•			•	•	•	•	R1	•	•	•	•	•	•	•	•	R1	R3	3	15
Costa Rica						•	•	•	•	•	•	•	•	R2	•	•	R1	R1	•	QF	R1	R1	•	6	18
Cuba		•	QF	•				•			•	•		•		•	•	•	•	•	•	•	•	1	14
Curaçao (Note: Competed as Curaçao until 1958 and as Netherlands Antilles from 1958 to 2010.)						•	•	•	•	•	•	•	•	•	•	•	•	•	•	•	•	•	R1	1	18
El Salvador									R1	•	•	R1	•	•	•	•	•	•	•	•	•	•	•	2	15
Haiti		•			•				•	R1	•	•	•		•	•	•	•	•	•	•	•	R1	2	16
Honduras							•	•	•	•		R1	•	•	•	•	•	•	R1	R1	•	•	•	3	16
Jamaica								•	•		•			•	•	R1	•	•	•	•	•	•	•	1	13
Mexico	R1	•		R1	R1	R1	R1	R1	QF	•	R1	•	QF		R2	R2	R2	R2	R2	R2	R2	R1	R3	18	20
Panama											•	•	•	•	•	•	•	•	•	•	R1	•	R1	2	13
Trinidad and Tobago								•	•	•	•	•	•	•	•	•	•	R1	•	•	•	•	•	1	16
United States	3rd	R1		R1	•	•	•	•	•	•	•	•	•	R1	R2	R1	QF	R1	R2	R2	•	R2	R3	12	21
Total (12 teams)	2	1	1	2	1	1	1	1	2	1	1	2	2	2	2	3	3	4	3	4	3	4	6	52	–

==== FIFA World Cup hosting ====
CONCACAF nations have hosted the FIFA World Cup four times.

The 1970 FIFA World Cup took place in Mexico, the first World Cup tournament to be staged in North America, and the first held outside Europe and South America. Mexico was chosen as the host nation in 1964 by FIFA's congress ahead of the only other submitted bid from Argentina. The tournament was won by Brazil. The victorious team led by Carlos Alberto, and featuring players such as Pelé, Gérson, Jairzinho, Rivellino, and Tostão, is often cited as the greatest-ever World Cup team. They achieved a perfect record of wins in all six games in the finals. Despite the issues of altitude and high temperature, the finals produced attacking football which created an average goals per game record not since bettered by any subsequent World Cup Finals. The 1970 Finals attracted a new record television audience for the FIFA World Cup and, for the first time, in color.

In 1986, Mexico became the first country to host the FIFA World Cup twice when it stepped in to stage the 1986 FIFA World Cup after the original host selection, Colombia, suffered financial problems. Colombia was originally chosen as hosts by FIFA in June 1974. However, the Colombian authorities eventually declared in November 1982 that they could not afford to host the World Cup because of economic concerns. Mexico was selected on 20 May 1983 as the replacement hosts, beating the bids of Canada and the United States, and thereby became the first nation to host two World Cups. This second World Cup in Mexico came 16 years after the first one in 1970.

The United States won the right to host the 1994 FIFA World Cup, defeating bids from Brazil and Morocco. The vote was held in Zurich on 4 July 1988, and only took one round with the United States bid receiving a little over half of the votes by the Exco members. FIFA hoped that by staging the world's most prestigious football tournament there, it would lead to a growth of interest in the sport; one condition FIFA imposed was the creation of a professional football league, Major League Soccer, starting in 1996. The U.S. staged a hugely successful tournament, with average attendance of nearly 69,000 breaking a record that surpassed the 1966 FIFA World Cup average attendance of 51,000 thanks to the large seating capacities the American stadiums provided for the spectators in comparison to the smaller venues of Europe and Latin America. To this day, the total attendance for the final tournament of nearly 3.6 million remains the highest in World Cup history, despite the expansion of the competition to 32 teams at the 1998 World Cup.

Canada, Mexico, and the United States won the bidding to host the 2026 FIFA World Cup, competing against a Moroccan bid.

=== FIFA Women's World Cup ===
FIFA Women's World Cup record
Team	1991 (China) (12)	1995 (Sweden) (12)	1999 (United States) (16)	2003 (United States) (16)	2007 (China) (16)	2011 (Germany) (16)	2015 (Canada) (24)	2019 (France) (24)	2023 (Australia) (New Zealand) (32)	2027 (Brazil) (32)	Years	inclusive WC Qual.
Canada	•	R1	R1	4th	R1	R1	QF	R2	R1		8	9
Costa Rica	•	•	•	•	•	•	R1	•	R1		2	9
Haiti	•	×	•	•	•	•	•	•	R1		1	8
Jamaica	•	•	×	•	•	×	•	R1	R2		2	9
Mexico	•	•	R1	•	•	R1	R1	•	•		3	9
Panama	×	×	×	•	•	×	•	•	R1		1	5
United States	1st	3rd	1st	3rd	3rd	2nd	1st	1st	R2		9	9
Total (7 teams)	1	2	3	2	2	3	4	3	6		26	–

=== Olympic Games ===
==== Men's tournament ====
Olympic Games (Men's tournament) record
Team	1900 (France) (3)	1904 (United States) (3)		1908 (United Kingdom) (6)	1912 (Sweden) (11)	1920 (Belgium) (14)	1924 (France) (22)	1928 (Netherlands) (17)	1936 (Germany) (16)	1948 (United Kingdom) (18)	1952 (Finland) (25)	1956 (Australia) (11)	1960 (Italy) (16)	1964 (Japan) (14)	1968 (Mexico) (16)	1972 (West Germany) (16)	1976 (Canada) (13)	1980 (Soviet Union) (16)	1984 (United States) (16)	1988 (South Korea) (16)	1992 (Spain) (16)	1996 (United States) (16)	2000 (Australia) (16)	2004 (Greece) (16)	2008 (China) (16)	2012 (United Kingdom) (16)	2016 (Brazil) (16)	2020 (Japan) (16)	2024 (France) (16)	2028 (United States) (12)	Years
Canada	–	1		–	–	–	–	–	–	–	–	–	–	–	–	–	13	–	6	–	–	–	–	–	–	–	–	–	–	–	3
Costa Rica	–	–		–	–	–	–	–	–	–	–	–	–	–	–	–	–	16	13	–	–	–	–	8	–	–	–	–	–	–	3
Cuba	–	–		–	–	–	–	–	–	–	–	–	–	–	–	–	11	7	–	–	–	–	–	–	–	–	–	–	–	–	2
Dominican Republic	–	–		–	–	–	–	–	–	–	–	–	–	–	–	–	–	–	–	–	–	–	–	–	–	–	–	–	12	–	1
El Salvador	–	–		–	–	–	–	–	–	–	–	–	–	–	15	–	–	–	–	–	–	–	–	–	–	–	–	–	–	–	1
Guatemala	–	–		–	–	–	–	–	–	–	–	–	–	–	8	–	10	–	–	16	–	–	–	–	–	–	–	–	–	–	3
Honduras	–	–		–	–	–	–	–	–	–	–	–	–	–	–	–	–	–	–	–	–	–	10	–	16	7	4	14	–	–	5
Mexico	–	–		–	–	–	–	=9	–	=11	–	–	–	11	4	7	9	–	–	–	10	7	–	=10	–	1	9	3	–	Q	13
Netherlands Antilles	–	–		–	–	–	–	–	–	–	=14	–	–	–	–	–	–	–	–	–	–	–	–	–	–	Split into 2 n.					1
United States	–	2	3 (Note: The United States had two teams at the 1904 Games, taking the silver and bronze medals.)	–	–	–	12	=9	=9	=11	=17	=5	–	–	–	14	–	–	9	12	9	10	4	–	9	–	–	–	8	Q	16
Total (10 teams)	0	2		0	0	0	1	2	1	2	2	1	0	1	3	2	4	2	3	2	2	2	2	2	2	2	2	2	2	2	48

==== Women's tournament ====
Olympic Games (Women's tournament) record
Team	1996 (United States) (8)	2000 (Australia) (8)	2004 (Greece) (10)	2008 (China) (12)	2012 (United Kingdom) (12)	2016 (Brazil) (12)	2020 (Japan) (12)	2024 (France) (12)	2028 (United States) (16)	Years
Canada	–	–	–	8	3	3	1	7		5
Mexico	–	–	8	–	–	–	–	–		1
United States	1	2	1	1	1	5	3	1	Q	8
Total (3 teams)	1	1	2	2	2	2	2	2	3	14

=== CONCACAF Gold Cup ===
CONCACAF Gold Cup record
Team	1991 (United States) (8)	1993 (Mexico) (United States) (8)	1996 (United States) (9)	1998 (United States) (10)	2000 (United States) (12)	2002 (United States) (12)	2003 (Mexico) (United States) (12)	2005 (United States) (12)	2007 (United States) (12)	2009 (United States) (12)	2011 (United States) (12)	2013 (United States) (12)	2015 (Canada) (United States) (12)	2017 (United States) (12)	2019 (Costa Rica) (Jamaica) (United States) (16)	2021 (United States) (16)	2023 (Canada) (United States) (16)	2025 (Canada) (United States) (16)	2027 (16)	Years
North American Football Union Members
Canada	GS	GS	GS		1st	3rd	GS	GS	SF	QF	GS	GS	GS	QF	QF	SF	QF	QF	Q	18
Mexico	3rd	1st	1st	1st	QF	QF	1st	QF	2nd	1st	1st	SF	1st	SF	1st	2nd	1st	1st	Q	19
United States	1st	2nd	3rd	2nd	QF	1st	3rd	1st	1st	2nd	2nd	1st	4th	1st	2nd	1st	SF	2nd	Q	19
Caribbean Football Union Members
Bermuda															GS					1
Cuba				GS		GS	QF	GS	GS		GS	QF	QF		GS		GS		Q	11
Curaçao														GS	QF			GS		3
Dominican Republic																		GS		1
French Guiana														GS						1
Grenada										GS	GS					GS				3
Guadeloupe									SF	GS	GS					GS	GS	GS		6
Guyana															GS				Q	2
Haiti					GS	QF			GS	QF		GS	GS		SF	GS	GS	GS		11
Jamaica	GS	3rd		4th	GS		QF	QF		GS	QF		2nd	2nd	SF	QF	SF	GS		14
Martinique		GS				QF	GS					GS		GS	GS	GS	GS			8
Saint Kitts and Nevis																	GS			1
Saint Lucia																			Q	1
Saint Vincent and the Grenadines			GS																Q	2
Suriname																GS		GS		2
Trinidad and Tobago	GS		GS	GS	SF	GS		GS	GS			QF	QF		GS	GS	GS	GS		13
Central American Football Union Members
Belize												GS								1
Costa Rica	4th	3rd		GS	QF	2nd	SF	QF	QF	SF	QF	QF	QF	SF	QF	QF	QF	QF		17
El Salvador			GS	GS		QF	QF		GS	GS	QF	QF	GS	QF	GS	QF	GS	GS		13
Guatemala	GS		4th	GS	GS	GS	GS	GS	QF		QF		GS			GS	QF	SF		13
Honduras	2nd	GS	GS	GS	QF		GS	SF	QF	SF	SF	SF	GS	QF	GS	QF	GS	SF		17
Nicaragua										GS				GS	GS					3
Panama		GS						2nd	QF	QF	SF	2nd	3rd	QF	QF	GS	2nd	QF	Q	13
Guest Nations
Brazil			2nd	3rd			2nd													3
Colombia					2nd		QF	SF												3
Ecuador						GS														1
Peru					SF															1
Qatar																SF	QF			2
Saudi Arabia																		QF	Q	2
South Africa								QF												1
South Korea					GS	4th														2

=== Copa América ===
Mexico have finished runners-up twice and third place three times at the Copa América, making El Tri the most successful non-CONMEBOL nation. The United States have reached the semi-final stage in the South American tournament twice, followed by Canada and Honduras, who have each reached it once. Costa Rica has reached the quarter-finals twice, while Panama has done so once.

Team	(Ecuador) 1993	(Uruguay) 1995	(Bolivia) 1997	(Paraguay) 1999	(Colombia) 2001	(Peru) 2004	(Venezuela) 2007	(Argentina) 2011	(Chile) 2015	(United States) 2016	(Brazil) 2019	(Brazil) 2021	(United States) 2024	Years
Canada	–	–	–	–	DNE	–	–	–	–	–	–	–	4th	1
Costa Rica	–	–	GS	–	QF	QF	–	GS	–	GS	–	–	GS	6
Haiti	–	–	–	–	–	–	–	–	–	GS	–	–	–	1
Honduras	–	–	–	–	3rd	–	–	–	–	–	–	–	–	1
Jamaica	–	–	–	–	–	–	–	–	GS	GS	–	–	GS	3
Mexico	2nd	QF	3rd	3rd	2nd	QF	3rd	GS	GS	QF	–	–	GS	11
Panama	–	–	–	–	–	–	–	–	–	GS	–	–	QF	2
United States	GS	4th	–	–	–	–	GS	–	–	4th	–	–	GS	5

=== CONCACAF W Championship ===
Legend

- 1st – Champions
- 2nd – Runners-up
- 3rd – Third place
- 4th – Fourth place
- GS – Group stage
- Q – Qualified for upcoming tournament
- • – Did not qualify
- † – Disqualified
- × – Did not enter / Withdrew / Banned
- – Hosts

Team	(Haiti) 1991 (8)	(United States) 1993 (4)	(Canada) 1994 (5)	(Canada) 1998 (8)	(United States) 2000 (8)	(Canada) (United States) 2002 (8)	(United States) 2006 (6)	(Mexico) 2010 (8)	(United States) 2014 (8)	(United States) 2018 (8)	(Mexico) 2022 (8)	(United States) 2026 (8)	Total
Canada	2nd	3rd	2nd	1st	4th	2nd	2nd	1st	×	2nd	2nd	Q	11
Costa Rica	GS	×	×	3rd	GS	4th	•	4th	2nd	GS	4th	Q	9
Cuba	×	×	×	×	×	×	×	•	•	GS	•	•	1
El Salvador	×	×	×	•	×	•	•	•	•	•	•	Q	1
Guatemala	×	×	×	4th	GS	—	—	GS	GS	†	—	—	4
Guyana	—	—	—	•	×	×	×	GS	×	•	•	•	1
Haiti	4th	×	×	GS	×	GS	•	GS	GS	•	GS	Q	7
Jamaica	GS	×	5th	×	×	GS	4th	×	GS	3rd	3rd	Q	8
Martinique	GS	×	×	GS	×	×	×	×	GS	•	×	×	3
Mexico	GS	×	3rd	2nd	GS	3rd	3rd	2nd	3rd	GS	GS	Q	11
Panama	×	×	×	×	×	GS	GS	×	•	4th	GS	Q	5
Puerto Rico	×	×	×	GS	×	•	×	•	•	•	•	•	1
Trinidad and Tobago	3rd	4th	4th	GS	GS	GS	GS	GS	4th	GS	GS	•	11
United States	1st	1st	1st	—	1st	1st	1st	3rd	1st	1st	1st	Q	11
Non-CONCACAF Invitees
Brazil	—	—	—	—	2nd	—	—	—	—	—	—	—	1
China	—	—	—	—	3rd	—	—	—	—	—	—	—	1
New Zealand	—	2nd	—	—	—	—	—	—	—	—	—	—	1
Total	8	4	5	8	8	8	6	8	8	8	8	8	8

=== CONCACAF W Gold Cup ===
CONCACAF W Gold Cup record
Team	(United States) 2024 (12)	Years
Canada	SF	1
Costa Rica	QF	1
Dominican Republic	GS	1
El Salvador	GS	1
Mexico	SF	1
Panama	GS	1
Puerto Rico	GS	1
United States	1st	1
Non-CONCACAF Invitees
Argentina	QF	1
Brazil	2nd	1
Colombia	QF	1
Paraguay	QF	1

=== FIFA U-20 World Cup ===
FIFA U-20 World Cup record
Team	1977 (Tunisia) (16)	1979 (Japan) (16)	1981 (Australia) (16)	1983 (Mexico) (16)	1985 (Soviet Union) (16)	1987 (Chile) (16)	1989 (Saudi Arabia) (16)	1991 (Portugal) (16)	1993 (Australia) (16)	1995 (Qatar) (16)	1997 (Malaysia) (24)	1999 (Nigeria) (24)	2001 (Argentina) (24)	2003 (United Arab Emirates) (24)	2005 (Netherlands) (24)	2007 (Canada) (24)	2009 (Egypt) (24)	2011 (Colombia) (24)	2013 (Turkey) (24)	2015 (New Zealand) (24)	2017 (South Korea) (24)	2019 (Poland) (24)	2023 (Argentina) (24)	2025 (Chile) (24)	2027 (Azerbaijan) (Uzbekistan) (24)	Years
Canada	•	R1	•	•	R1	R1	•	•	•	•	R2	•	R1	QF	R1	R1	•	•	•	•	•	•	•	•	Q	9
Costa Rica	•	•	•	•	•	•	R1	•	•	R1	R1	R2	R2	•	•	R1	4th	R2	•	•	R2	•	•	•	Q	10
Cuba	•	•	•	•	•	•	•	•	•	•	•	•	•	•	•	•	•	•	R1	•	•	•	•	R1	•	2
Dominican Republic	•	•	•	•	•	•	•	•	•	•	•	•	•	•	•	•	•	•	•	•	•	•	R1	•	•	1
El Salvador	•	•	•	•	•	•	•	•	•	•	•	•	•	•	•	•	•	•	R1	•	•	•	•	•	•	1
Guatemala	•	•	•	•	•	•	•	•	•	•	•	•	•	•	•	•	•	R2	•	•	•	•	R1	•	•	2
Honduras	R1	•	•	•	•	•	•	•	•	R1	•	R1	•	•	R1	•	R1	•	•	R1	R1	R1	R1	•	•	9
Jamaica	•	•	•	•	•	•	•	•	•	•	•	•	R1	•	•	•	•	•	•	•	•	•	•	•	•	1
Mexico	2nd	R1	R1	R1	QF	•	×	QF	QF	•	R2	QF	•	R1	•	QF	•	3rd	R2	R1	QF	R1	•	QF	Q	18
Panama	•	•	•	•	•	•	•	•	•	•	•	•	•	R1	R1	R1	•	R1	•	R1	•	R2	•	R1	•	7
Trinidad and Tobago			•	•	•	•	•	R1	•	•	•	•	•	•	•	•	R1	•	•	•	•	•	•	•	•	2
United States	•	•	R1	R1	•	R1	4th	•	QF	•	R2	R2	R2	QF	R2	QF	R1	•	R1	QF	QF	QF	QF	QF	Q	19
Total (12 teams)	2	2	2	2	2	2	2	2	2	2	4	4	4	4	4	5	4	4	4	4	4	4	4	4	4	81

=== FIFA U-20 Women's World Cup ===
FIFA U-20 Women's World Cup record
Team	2002 (Canada) (12)	2004 (Thailand) (12)	2006 (Russia) (16)	2008 (Chile) (16)	2010 (Germany) (16)	2012 (Japan) (16)	2014 (Canada) (16)	2016 (Papua New Guinea) (16)	2018 (France) (16)	2022 (Costa Rica) (16)	2024 (Colombia) (24)	2026 (Poland) (24)	Years
Canada	2nd	QF	R1	R1	•	R1	QF	R1	•	R1	R2	QF	10
Costa Rica	•	•	•	•	R1	•	R1	•	•	R1	R1	R1	5
Haiti	•	•	•	•	•	•	•	•	R1	•	•	•	1
Mexico	R1	•	R1	R1	QF	QF	R1	QF	R1	QF	R2	R1	11
United States	1st	3rd	4th	1st	QF	1st	QF	4th	R1	R1	3rd	R2	12
Total (5 teams)	3	2	3	3	3	3	4	3	3	4	4	4	39

=== FIFA U-17 World Cup ===
FIFA U-17 World Cup record
Team	1985 (China) (16)	1987 (Canada) (16)	1989 (Scotland) (16)	1991 (Italy) (16)	1993 (Japan) (16)	1995 (Ecuador) (16)	1997 (Egypt) (16)	1999 (New Zealand) (16)	2001 (Trinidad and Tobago) (16)	2003 (Finland) (16)	2005 (Peru) (16)	2007 (South Korea) (24)	2009 (Nigeria) (24)	2011 (Mexico) (24)	2013 (United Arab Emirates) (24)	2015 (Chile) (24)	2017 (India) (24)	2019 (Brazil) (24) (Note: Original hosts Peru were stripped of the right to host the 2019 event in February 2019.)	2023 (Indonesia) (24)	2025 (Qatar) (48)	2026 (Qatar) (48)	Years
Canada	•	R1	R1	•	R1	R1	•	•	•	•	•	•	•	R1	R1	•	•	R1	R1	R2	•	9
Costa Rica	R1	•	•	•	•	R1	R1	•	QF	QF	QF	R2	R1	•	•	QF	R1	•	•	R1	Q	11
Cuba	•	•	R1	R1	•	•	•	•	•	•	•	•	•	•	•	•	•	•	•	•	Q	3
Dominican Republic	•	•	•	•	•	•	•	•	•	•	•	•	•	•	•	•	•	•	•	•	Q	1
El Salvador	•	•	•	•	•	•	•	•	•	•	•	•	•	•	•	•	•	•	•	R1	•	1
Haiti	•	•	•	•	•	•	•	•	•	•	•	R1	•	•	•	•	•	R1	•	R1	Q	4
Honduras	•	•	•	•	•	•	•	•	•	•	•	R1	R1	•	QF	R1	R2	•	•	R1	Q	7
Jamaica	•	•	•	•	•	•	•	R1	•	•	•	•	•	R1	•	•	•	•	•	•	Q	3
Mexico	R1	R1	•	R1	R1	•	R1	QF	•	QF	1st	•	R2	1st	2nd	4th	R2	2nd	R2	R3	Q	17
Panama	•	•	•	•	•	•	•	•	•	•	•	•	•	R2	R1	•	•	•	R1	R1	Q	5
Trinidad and Tobago	•	•	•	•	•	•	•	•	R1	•	•	R1	•	•	•	•	•	•	•	•	•	2
United States	R1	R1	R1	QF	QF	R1	R1	4th	R1	QF	QF	R2	R2	R2	•	R1	QF	R1	R2	R2	•	19
Total (11 teams)	3	3	3	3	3	3	3	2	3	3	3	5	4	5	4	4	4	4	4	8	8	83

=== FIFA U-17 Women's World Cup ===
FIFA U-17 Women's World Cup record
Team	2008 (New Zealand) (16)	2010 (Trinidad and Tobago) (16)	2012 (Azerbaijan) (16)	2014 (Costa Rica) (16)	2016 (Jordan) (16)	2018 (Uruguay) (16)	2022 (India) (16)	2024 (Dominican Republic) (16)	2025 (Morocco) (24)	2026 (Morocco) (24)	Years
Canada	QF	R1	QF	QF	R1	4th	R1	•	QF	Q	8
Costa Rica	R1	•	•	R1	•	•	•	•	R1	•	3
Dominican Republic	×	×	•	•	•	•	•	R1	•	•	1
Mexico	•	R1	R1	QF	QF	2nd	R1	R1	3rd	Q	8
Puerto Rico	•	•	•	•	•	•	•	•	•	Q	1
Trinidad and Tobago	•	R1	•	•	•	•	•	•	•	•	1
United States	2nd	•	R1	•	R1	R1	QF	3rd	R2	Q	7
Total (7 teams)	3	3	3	3	3	3	3	3	4	4	32

=== FIFA Futsal World Cup ===
FIFA Futsal World Cup record
Team	1989 (Netherlands) (16)	1992 (Hong Kong) (16)	1996 (Spain) (16)	2000 (Guatemala) (16)	2004 (Taiwan) (16)	2008 (Brazil) (20)	2012 (Thailand) (24)	2016 (Colombia) (24)	2021 (Lithuania) (24)	2024 (Uzbekistan) (24)	Years
Canada	R1										1
Costa Rica		R1		R1			R1	R2	R1	R2	6
Cuba			R1	R1	R1	R1		R1		R1	6
Guatemala				R1		R1	R1	R1	R1	R1	6
Mexico							R1				1
Panama							R2	R1	R1	R1	4
United States	3rd	2nd	R1		R2	R1			R1		6
Total (7 teams)	2	2	2	3	2	3	4	4	4	4	30

=== FIFA Beach Soccer World Cup ===
FIFA Beach Soccer World Cup record
Team	1995 (Brazil) (8)	1996 (Brazil) (8)	1997 (Brazil) (8)	1998 (Brazil) (10)	1999 (Brazil) (12)	2000 (Brazil) (12)	2001 (Brazil) (12)	2002 (Brazil) (8)	2003 (Brazil) (8)	2004 (Brazil) (12)	2005 (Brazil) (12)	2006 (Brazil) (16)	2007 (Brazil) (16)	2008 (France) (16)	2009 (United Arab Emirates) (16)	2011 (Italy) (16)	2013 (French Polynesia) (16)	2015 (Portugal) (16)	2017 (The Bahamas) (16)	2019 (Paraguay) (16)	2021 (Russia) (16)	2024 (United Arab Emirates) (16)	2025 (Seychelles) (16)	Years
Bahamas	•	•	•	•	•	•	•	•	•	•	•	•	•	•	•	•	•	•	R1; 11th	•	•	•	•	1
Canada	•	R1; 7th	•	•	QF; 7th	•	•	•	•	•	•	QF; 7th	•	•	•	•	•	•	•	•	•	•	•	3
Costa Rica	•	•	•	•	•	•	•	•	•	•	•	•	•	•	R1; 15th	•	•	R1; 16th	•	•	•	•	•	2
El Salvador	•	•	•	•	•	•	•	•	•	•	•	•	•	R1; 14th	R1; 14th	4th	QF; 6th	•	•	•	R1; 15th	•	R1	6
Guatemala	•	•	•	•	•	•	•	•	•	•	•	•	•	•	•	•	•	•	•	•	•	•	R1	1
Mexico	•	•	•	•	•	•	•	•	•	•	•	•	2nd	R1; 11th	•	QF; 8th	•	R1; 15th	R1; 13th	R1; 15th	•	R1; 16th	•	7
Panama	•	•	•	•	•	•	•	•	•	•	•	•	•	•	•	•	•	•	R1; 14th	•	•	•	•	1
United States	2nd	4th	3rd	R1; 7th	QF; 6th	QF; 7th	QF; 5th	•	R1; 8th	R1; 10th	R1; 10th	R1; 13th	R1; 13th	•	•	•	R1; 10th	•	•	R1; 14th	R1; 16th	R1; 14th	•	15
Total (8 teams)	1	2	1	1	2	1	1	0	1	1	1	2	2	2	2	2	2	2	3	2	2	2	2	36

=== Former tournaments ===
==== FIFA Confederations Cup ====
FIFA Confederations Cup record
Team	1992 (Saudi Arabia) (4)	1995 (Saudi Arabia) (6)	1997 (Saudi Arabia) (8)	1999 (Mexico) (8)	2001 (South Korea) (Japan) (8)	2003 (France) (8)	2005 (Germany) (8)	2009 (South Africa) (8)	2013 (Brazil) (8)	2017 (Russia) (8)	Years
Canada	•	•	•	×	GS	•	•	•	•	•	1
Mexico	•	3rd	GS	1st	GS	•	4th	•	GS	4th	7
United States	3rd	•	•	3rd	•	GS	•	2nd	•	•	4
Total (3 teams)	1	1	1	2	2	1	1	1	1	1	12

== Hall of fame ==
- (Aruba) Hubert Tromp
- (Bermuda) Gerard Bean
- (Bermuda) Matthew Hogan
- (Brazil) João Havelange
- (Canada) Jim Fleming
- (Canada) Rudy Gittens
- (Costa Rica) Hiram Sosa López
- (Costa Rica) Isaac Sasso
- (Costa Rica) Julio Moya
- (Costa Rica) Ramón Coll Jaumet
- (Curaçao) Andres Avelino Constansia (Note: Inducted in 2015)
- (Dominica) Patrick John
- (United Kingdom) Mavis Derflinger
- (United Kingdom) Clive Toye
- (Guatemala) Guillermo Cañedo
- (Guatemala) Oscar Thamar
- (Guatemala) Carlos Carrera
- (Guadeloupe) Jacques Rugard
- (Honduras) Federico Fortín
- (Honduras) Rafael L. Callejas Romero
- (Jamaica) Anthony James
- (Jamaica) George Abrahams
- (Jamaica) Ricardo Gardener
- (Jamaica) Lincoln "Happy" Sutherland (Note: Inducted in 2013)
- (Mexico) Aaron Padilla Gutiérrez
- (Mexico) Arturo Yamasaki
- (Mexico) Javier Arriaga
- (Mexico) Jesús Martínez
- (Mexico) Joaquín Soria Terrazas
- (Martinique) Joseph Ursulet
- (Nicaragua) Júlio Rocha
- (Netherlands Antilles) Mordy Maduro
- (Panama) Ariel Alvarado
- (Switzerland) Sepp Blatter
- (Suriname) André Kamperveen
- (United States) Gene Edwards
- (United States) Kurt Lamm
- (United States) Werner Fricker

=== Team of the Century ===
The CONCACAF Team of the Century was announced as part of the festivities associated with the 1998 FIFA World Cup in France.

1. GK — Antonio Carbajal (Mexico)
2. DF — Marcelo Balboa (United States)
3. DF — Gilberto Yearwood (Honduras)
4. DF — Bruce Wilson (Canada)
5. DF — Gustavo Peña (Mexico)
6. MF — Ramón Ramírez (Mexico)
7. MF — Mágico González (El Salvador)
8. MF — Tab Ramos (United States)
9. FW — Julio César Dely Valdés (Panama)
10. FW — Hugo Sánchez (Mexico)
11. FW — Hernán Medford (Costa Rica)

== President's award ==
2013

- Carlos Ruiz for speaking out against match-fixing in Guatemala
- (Belize) Ian Gaynair for reporting an offer of a bribe

2015

- United States for winning the 2012 Summer Olympics Women's football tournament
- Mexico for winning the 2012 Summer Olympics Men's football tournament

== Logos ==
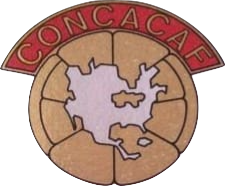
1961 to 1994

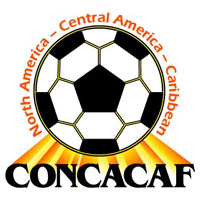
1994 to 1999

2004 to 2018

== Corruption ==
At the CONCACAF Congress in May 2012 in Budapest, Hungary, legal counsel John P. Collins informed the members of CONCACAF of several financial irregularities. Collins revealed that Jack Warner, the former CONCACAF President, had registered the $22 million 'Dr. João Havelange Centre of Excellence' development in Port-of-Spain under the name of two companies that Warner owned. In addition, Warner had secured a mortgage against the asset in 2007 which the CONCACAF members were also unaware of; the mortgage was co-signed by Lisle Austin, a former vice-president of CONCACAF. The loan defaulted.

Collins also revealed that CONCACAF, despite most of its income coming from the United States, had not paid any tax to the Internal Revenue Service since at least 2007 and had never filed a return in the United States. Although CONCACAF is a registered non-profit organization in the Bahamas and headquartered in Port-of-Spain, Trinidad, they have an administration office in New York, and BDO and CONCACAF invited the IRS to investigate potential liabilities. It is thought that CONCACAF may have to pay up to $2 million plus penalties.

Chuck Blazer stated that a full financial audit into CONCACAF by New-York based consultancy BDO was delayed due to the actions of Jack Warner and his personal accountant, and the accounts could not be "signed off" as a consequence.

In addition, Blazer is to sue CONCACAF for unpaid commission of sponsorship and marketing deals which he had made in 2010 during his time as general secretary. Blazer received a 10% commission on any deal that he made on behalf of CONCACAF.

The Bermuda FA asked members of CONCACAF to lobby FIFA to remove Blazer from his position on the FIFA Executive Committee. Blazer suggested that it was less to do with financial irregularities and more for his role in the removal of Jack Warner in the Caribbean Football Union corruption scandal: "I spent 21 years building the confederation and its competitions and its revenues and I'm the one responsible for its good levels of income . . . I think this is a reflection of those who were angry at me having caused the action against Warner. This is also a reaction by people who have their own agenda."

Jack Warner presided over CONCACAF for 21 years. Warner was one of the most controversial figures in world football. Warner was suspended as president on 30 May 2011 due to his temporary suspension from football-related activity by FIFA following corruption allegations. A power struggle developed at CONCACAF following the allegations against Warner. The allegations against Warner were reported to the FIFA Ethics Committee by Chuck Blazer, the secretary general of CONCACAF. The acting president of CONCACAF, Lisle Austin, sent Blazer a letter saying he was "terminated as general secretary with immediate effect". Austin described Blazer's actions as "inexcusable and a gross misconduct of duty and judgement" and said the American was no longer fit to hold the post. The executive committee of CONCACAF later issued a statement saying that Austin did not have the authority to fire Blazer, and the decision was unauthorized. On 20 June 2011, Jack Warner resigned from the presidency of CONCACAF, all posts with FIFA, and removed himself from all participation in football, in the wake of the corruption investigation resulting from 10 May 2011 meeting of the Caribbean Football Union. The vice-president of CONCACAF, Alfredo Hawit, acted as president until May 2012.

=== Indicted CONCACAF individuals ===
Several CONCACAF officials have been indicted.

Name	Nationality	FIFA position	CONCACAF position	Regional or national position	Status	Ref.
Chuck Blazer	United States		Former general secretary		Guilty plea	
Alfredo Hawit	Honduras	Vice-president	President		Arrested	
Eduardo Li	Costa Rica	member-elect of executive committee	member of executive committee	President of the Costa Rican Football Federation	Arrested	
Costas Takkas	Cayman Islands		Attaché to the president	Former general secretary of the Cayman Islands Football Association	Arrested	
Daryan Warner	Trinidad and Tobago; Grenada			Son of Jack Warner	Guilty plea	
Daryll Warner	Trinidad and Tobago; United States	former development officer		Son of Jack Warner	Guilty plea	
Jack Warner	Trinidad and Tobago	Former vice president	former president	former Minister of National Security	Bailed	
Jeffrey Webb	Cayman Islands	Vice President	President	President of the Cayman Islands Football Association	Bailed	

== See also ==
=== CONCACAF ===
- CONCACAF Awards—In November 2013, CONCACAF announced that they would create annual awards for the best players, coaches, and referees.
- List of CONCACAF competitions—current schedule for finals
- List of presidents of CONCACAF

=== Related links ===
- Confederation of South American Football (CONMEBOL)
- Confederación Centroamericana y del Caribe de Fútbol
- International Federation of Association Football (FIFA)
- Union of European Football Associations (UEFA)
- List of association football sub-confederations
- Confederation of African Football (CAF)
- North American Football Confederation
- Oceania Football Confederation (OFC)
- Asian Football Confederation (AFC)
- Timeline of association football
- Soccer in the United States
- Football in Mexico
- Soccer in Canada
