= Jovaunn Ramos =

Belizean footballer (born 2002)

Personal information
- Date of birth: 24 March 2002 (age 24)
- Place of birth: Belize City, Belize
- Height: 1.78 m (5 ft 10 in)
- Position: Midfielder

Team information
- Current team: Rochester
- Number: 11

College career
Years	Team	Apps	(Gls)
2022–	UNOH Racers	38	(8)

Senior career*
Years	Team	Apps	(Gls)
2021–2022	Verdes		
2023–	Rochester	3	(0)

International career^{‡}
2022–	Belize	5	(0)
- * Club domestic league appearances and goals ‡ National team caps and goals as of 19:25, 18 September 2023 (UTC)

Jovaunn Ramos (born 24 March 2002) is a Belizean association footballer who currently plays for USL League Two club Rochester FC and the Belize national team.

== Career ==
=== Youth ===
As a youth, Ramos played as a striker. At the under-13 level, he played for Brown Bombers FC. In 2015 he led the club to the U13 division championship. He was the competition's top scorer and named the Most Valuable Player. The following summer, he was selected as part of a small group to participate in a training camp in Miami hosted by Miami FC. He had attended a similar camp in Miami a year earlier. By 2019 he had joined Stars Academy FC. That year the club won the National U17 Championship and earned the right to compete in the 2019 UNCAF U-17 Interclub Cup in Honduras.

=== College ===
In summer 2022 it was announced that Ramos had received a scholarship to play college soccer in the United States with the Racers of University of Northwestern Ohio of the NAIA. During his first season with the team, Ramos made twenty-one appearances, scoring three goals. Following the season he was named to the WHAC Second All-Conference Team and All-Newcomer Team.

=== Club ===
By the 2021–22 season, Ramos joined Verdes FC of the Belize Premier Football League. He was among the top scorers in the league that season as the club were crowned league champions and qualified for the 2022 CONCACAF League. He remained with the club entering the 2022–23 season. In summer 2022 Ramos was named Belize's Youth Footballer of the Year.

In March 2023, during the college soccer offseason, Ramos joined Rochester FC of the USL League Two for the upcoming season. He was joined at the club by national teammate Warren Moss.

== International career ==
Ramos made his senior international debut on 27 March 2022 in a friendly with Cuba. Later that year he was called up again for four 2022–23 CONCACAF Nations League B matches.

=== International career statistics ===
As of match played 24 March 2023.

Belize national team
2022	4	0
2023	1	0
Total	5	0
