= CONCACAF Giants Cup =

2001 CONCACAF Giants Cup
Copa de Gigantes

Tournament details
- Dates: March 4 – August 5
- Teams: 12

Final positions
- Champions: (Mexico) América (1st title)
- Runners-up: (United States) D.C. United
- 2002 CONCACAF Champions' Cup: América; D.C. United

Tournament statistics
- Matches played: 27
- Goals scored: 54 (2 per match)

The CONCACAF Giants Cup was an international football club competition held in 2001 to replace the CONCACAF Cup Winners Cup. The tournament was organized by CONCACAF for the 12 teams with the highest attendance in their respective national leagues. The winners and runners-up would qualify for the new CONCACAF Clubs Cup, which would serve as a qualification tournament for the FIFA Club World Championship. The Giants Cup was announced in November 2000 and planned to be one of the two primary annual club tournaments for CONCACAF alongside the more traditional Champions' Cup.

The tournament's semifinals and final were originally scheduled to take place in late April in Los Angeles, but were later postponed to early August to accommodate conflicts with the teams' schedules. The prize money for the Giants Cup was set at $50,000 for the winner and $40,000 for the runners-up. Mexico's Club América won 2–0 in the final against D.C. United of the United States at the Los Angeles Memorial Coliseum, with 3,127 spectators in attendance. Both teams qualified for the CONCACAF Champions' Cup 2002, which replaced the Clubs Cup in October 2001.

== First round ==
| March 4, 2001 1st leg | Transvaal (Suriname) | 1–1 | (Jamaica) Arnett Gardens | Paramaribo, Suriname |
| 15:00 | Kijansi 31' | | Neil 63' | Stadium: André Kamperveen Stadion; Referee: Urvin Faneijte (ANT) |

| March 11, 2001 2nd leg | Arnett Gardens (Jamaica) | 5–1 (6–2 agg.) | (Suriname) Transvaal | Kingston, Jamaica |
| 15:00 | Shedden 15', 77'; Neil 60'; Smith 88'; Chin-Sue 90' | | Reingoud 32' | Stadium: Tony Spaulding Sports Complex; Referee: Mervin Lee (ATG) |

Arnett Gardens qualified for the quarterfinals.

| March 7, 2001 1st leg | Alianza (El Salvador) | 1–5 | (Costa Rica) Saprissa | San Salvador, El Salvador |
| 12:00 | Larrea 45' | | Campos 33'; Fonseca 58', 83'; Vieira 67'; Centeno 87' | Stadium: Estadio Cuscatlán; Referee: Hugo Castillo (GUA) |

| March 9, 2001 2nd leg | Saprissa (Costa Rica) | 0–0 (5–1 agg.) | (El Salvador) Alianza | San Juan de Tibás, Costa Rica |
| 20:00 | | | | Stadium: Estadio Ricardo Saprissa Aymá; Referee: Marcio Carranza (HON) |

Saprissa qualified for the quarterfinals.

| March 7, 2001 1st leg | Águila (El Salvador) | 1–3 | (Guatemala) Municipal | San Miguel, El Salvador |
| 15:00 | Sampaio 72' | | Acevedo 11', 69'; Pérez 64' | Stadium: Estadio Juan Francisco Barraza; Referee: Roberto Moreno (PAN) |

| March 14, 2001 2nd leg | Municipal (Guatemala) | 1–1 (4–2 agg.) | (El Salvador) Águila | Guatemala City, Guatemala |
| 20:00 | Martins 19' | | Ponciano 74' | Stadium: Estadio Mateo Flores; Referee: Vivian Rodríguez (HON) |

Municipal qualified for the quarterfinals.

| March 7, 2001 1st leg | Comunicaciones (Guatemala) | 4–0 | (Honduras) Motagua | Guatemala City, Guatemala |
| 20:00 | Torres 15', 31', 39'; Machón 44' | | | Stadium: Estadio Mateo Flores; Referee: Olger Mejía (CRC) |

| March 14, 2001 2nd leg | Motagua (Honduras) | 1–1 (1–5 agg.) | (Guatemala) Comunicaciones | Tegucigalpa, Honduras |
| 19:30 | Carballo 42' | | Machón 15' | Stadium: Estadio Tiburcio Carías Andino; Referee: Neftalí Recinos (SLV) |

Comunicaciones qualified for the quarterfinals.

== Quarterfinals ==
April 4, 2001

| Arnett Gardens (Jamaica) | 0–3 | (United States) D.C. United |
|---|---|---|
| | Report |

Anthony Spaulding Sports Complex, Kingston
April 11, 2001

| D.C. United (United States) | 2–1 | (Jamaica) Arnett Gardens |
|---|---|---|
| | Report |

Robert F. Kennedy Memorial Stadium, Washington, D.C.

D.C. United won 5–1 on aggregate.

July 25, 2001

| Comunicaciones (Guatemala) | 3–1 | (Mexico) Guadalajara |
|---|---|---|
| | Report |

Estadio Doroteo Guamuch Flores, Guatemala City
August 1, 2001

| Guadalajara (Mexico) | 1–1 | (Guatemala) Comunicaciones |
|---|---|---|
| | Report |

Los Angeles Memorial Coliseum, Los Angeles

Comunicaciones won 4–2 on aggregate.

July 8, 2001

| C.S.D. Municipal (Guatemala) | 0–1 | (Mexico) Club América |
|---|---|---|
| | Report |

Estadio Doroteo Guamuch Flores, Guatemala City
July 31, 2001
20:00 (18:00 UTC−6)

| Club América (Mexico) | 2–1 | (Guatemala) C.S.D. Municipal |
|---|---|---|
| | Report |

Los Angeles Memorial Coliseum, Los Angeles

América won 3–1 on aggregate.

April 4, 2001

| Deportivo Saprissa (Costa Rica) | 2–0 | (United States) Columbus Crew |
|---|---|---|
| | Report |

Estadio Ricardo Saprissa Aymá, San Juan de Tibás
April 11, 2001

| Columbus Crew (United States) | 1–1 | (Costa Rica) Deportivo Saprissa |
|---|---|---|
| | Report |

Historic Crew Stadium, Columbus

Saprissa won 3–1 on aggregate.

== Semifinals ==
August 3, 2001

| D.C. United (United States) | 2–1 | (Guatemala) Comunicaciones |
|---|---|---|
| Moreno 26'; Lisi 88' | Report | García 22' |

Los Angeles Memorial Coliseum, Los Angeles
Attendance: 4,533

August 3, 2001

| Deportivo Saprissa (Costa Rica) | 1–2 | (Mexico) Club América |
|---|---|---|
| | Report |

Los Angeles Memorial Coliseum, Los Angeles

== Final ==
August 5, 2001
12:00 UTC-6

| Club América (Mexico) | 2–0 | (United States) D.C. United |
|---|---|---|
| Mendoza 52'; Valdez 70' | Report |

Los Angeles Memorial Coliseum, Los Angeles
Attendance: 3,127

== Champion ==
CONCACAF Giants Cup
2001 Winners
(Mexico)
América
First title

== Top goalscorers ==
- Jorge Toledano (América) – 3 goals
- Martín Machón (Comunicaciones) – 3 goals
- Walter Centeno (Saprissa) – 2 goals
- Rolando Fonseca (Saprissa) – 2 goals
- Raúl Díaz Arce (D.C. United) – 2 goals
