= Nations League =

Nations League may refer to:

== Sports ==
=== Association football ===
- AFC Nations League
- African Nations League
- CONCACAF Nations League
- CONCACAF W Nations League
- CONMEBOL Women's Nations League
- UEFA Nations League
- UEFA Women's Nations League

=== Volleyball ===
- FIVB Men's Volleyball Nations League
- FIVB Women's Volleyball Nations League

== See also ==
- League of Nations, a worldwide intergovernmental organisation 1920–1946
- League of Nations (professional wrestling), a professional wrestling stable
- National League (disambiguation)
- Nations Championship, in rugby union
- Nations Cup
