= 2006 CONCACAF Beach Soccer Championship =

1st beach soccer championship for CONCACAF

2006 FIFA Beach Soccer World Cup qualification (CONCACAF)

Tournament details
- Host country: Costa Rica
- Dates: 13–17 September
- Teams: 5 (from 1 confederation)
- Venue: 1 Hotel Punta Leona (in 1 Garabito host cities)

Final positions
- Champions: United States (1st title)
- Runners-up: Canada
- Third place: Costa Rica
- Fourth place: Mexico

Tournament statistics
- Matches played: 10
- Goals scored: 83 (8.3 per match)
- Top scorer: (Mexico) Ricardo Villalobos
- Best player: (United States) Francis Farberoff

The 2006 CONCACAF Beach Soccer Championship, also known as the 2006 FIFA Beach Soccer World Cup qualifiers for (CONCACAF), was the first beach soccer championship for CONCACAF, held in September 2006, in Puntarenas, Costa Rica. The USA won the championship, with Canada finishing second. The two moved on to play in the 2006 FIFA Beach Soccer World Cup in Rio de Janeiro, Brazil from 2 November - 12 November.

== Competing nations ==
- Canada
- Costa Rica (hosts)
- Jamaica
- Mexico
- United States

== Team USA Roster ==
The following outlines the player roster and coaching staff for Team USA during the 2006 CONCACAF Beach Soccer Tournament:
Player name	Position	Date of birth
Luis Montanoz	GK	27.07.1982
Austin Roman	DF	14.09.1979
Brendon Taguinod	DF	02.02.1979
Yurt Maraler	MF	30.09.1981
Benyam Astorga	DF	14.05.1972
Ronald Silva	FW	11.11.1982
Joshua Hill	DF	02.07.1981
Anthony Chimienti	FW	17.06.1979
Zak Ibsen	DF	06.06.1972
Francis Farberoff	FW	16.03.1975
Raphael Xexeo	FW	30.10.1979
Bayard Lifvin	GK	01.02.1981

=== Coaching and Support Staff ===
- Technical Director: Roberto Ceciliano
- Assistant Coach: Chris Antonopoulos
- Coordinator: Georgi Katron
- Doctor: Brad Moser
- Trainer: Mike Overturi

== Matches ==
=== Day 1 ===
September 13, 2006

Canada	0–3	United States
	Report	Brendon Taguinod 9'; Yuri Morales 28'; Zak Ibsen 35'

Punta Leona, Puntarenas
Attendance: 950
Referee: Antonio Buaiz (Brazil)

September 13, 2006

Costa Rica	8–6	Jamaica
Danny Jonson 3', 11', 23'; Roy Myers 21'; Hans Morales 22'; Jeffrey Chavarria 25', 29'; Christian Ovares 34'	Report	Gerald Neil 13'; Derrick Planter 14'; Dwen Wanliss 16'; Gregory Simpson 20'; Shawn Hunter 22'; Andre Reid 23'

Punta Leona, Puntarenas
Attendance: 950
Referee: Juan Marcelo Rodriguez (Argentina)

=== Day 2 ===
September 14, 2006

United States	5–2	Jamaica
Yuri Morales 1', 2'; Benyam Astorga 5'; Anthony Chimienti 13'; Ronald Silva 19'	Report	Shaun Hunter 9'; Gregory Simpson 23'

Punta Leona, Puntarenas
Attendance: 950
Referee: Erick Chavarra (Costa Rica)

September 14, 2006

Mexico	4–6	Canada
Jesus Lopez 5'; Ricardo Villalobos 15', 31', 32'	Report	Eric Munoz 2', 30'; Sipho Sibiya 4'; Paul Manji Dhaliwal 7'; Ian Carlos Díaz 9'; Jason Miniaci 35'

Punta Leona, Puntarenas
Attendance: 950
Referee: Kiarash Dehpanan (USA)

=== Day 3 ===
September 15, 2006

Jamaica	3–7	Canada
Andre Reid 8'; Gerald Neil 19', 28'	Report	Kyle Yamada 1', 11', 25'; Ian Carlos Díaz 5', 32'; Chris Lemire 23'; Damir Daco Jesic 31'

Punta Leona, Puntarenas
Attendance: 950
Referee: Jorge Gasso(Mexico)

September 15, 2006

Costa Rica	4–4 1-0 (pen.)	Mexico
Danny Jhonson 20'; Jeffrey Chavarria 22'; Hans Morales 22'; Andres Villegas 35'	Report	Jose Fernando Dávila 13'; Jose Luís Navarrete 18'; Antonio González 31'; Jesús López 36'

Punta Leona, Puntarenas
Attendance: 1000
Referee: Antonio Buaiz (Brazil)

=== Day 4 ===
September 16, 2006

United States	7–4	Mexico
Benyam Astorga 1'; Zak Ibsen 12'; Francis Farberoff 18'; Anthony Chimienti 20'; Raphael Xexeo 22'; Yuri Morales 26', 27'	Report	Jesús López 7'; Ricardo Villalobos 13', 31'; Genoni Martinez 28'

Punta Leona, Puntarenas
Attendance: 547
Referee: Nelson Bonilla (Costa Rica)

September 16, 2006

Costa Rica	4–6	Canada
Jeffrey Chavarria 11', 21'; Ron Myers 20'; Jose Calvo 28'	Report	Sipho Sibiya 1'; Kyt Selaidopoulos 18', 27'; Damir Deco Jesic 21'; Kyle Yamada 28'; Ian Carlos Díaz 30'

Punta Leona, Puntarenas
Attendance: 547
Referee: Antonio Buaiz (Brazil)

=== Day 5 ===
September 17, 2006

Mexico	3–2	Jamaica
Ricardo Villalobos 1', 13'; Antonio González 10'	Report	Gregory Simpson 21'; Gerald Neil 21'

Punta Leona, Puntarenas
Attendance: 950
Referee: Kiarash Dehpanan (USA)

September 17, 2006

Costa Rica	3–2	United States
Andrés Villegas 19'; Roy Myers 25'; Wilberth Mora 31'	Report	Anthony Chimienti 13'; Ronald Silva 31'

Punta Leona, Puntarenas
Attendance: 950
Referee: Jorge Gasso (Mexico)

== Final standings ==
Team	Pts	Pld	W	L	GF	GA	GD
United States	9	4	3	1	17	10	+7
Canada	9	4	3	1	19	14	+5
Costa Rica	8	4	3	1	19	18	+1
Mexico	3	4	1	3	15	19	-4
Jamaica	0	4	0	4	13	23	-10

=== Winners ===
(2006) FIFA Beach Soccer World Cup
Qualification (CONCACAF) Winners:

United States
First title

== Top scorers ==
7 goals

- (Mexico) Ricardo Villalobos

5 goals

- (United States) Yuri Morales
- (Costa Rica) Jeffrey Chavarría

4 goals

- (Canada) Kyle Yamada
- (Jamaica) Gerald Neil
- (Canada) Ian Carlos Díaz
- (Costa Rica) Danny Jhonson

== Awards ==
Best Player (MVP)
(United States) Francis Farberoff
Top Scorer
(Mexico) Ricardo Villalobos
Best Goalkeeper
(Canada) Jim Larkin
FIFA Fair Play Award
Canada
