= Nations Cup =

Nations Cup may refer to:

== Association football ==
- Africa Cup of Nations, continental association football tournament in Africa
- OFC Nations Cup, also known as Oceania Nations Cup, continental association football tournament in Oceania
- 2011 Nations Cup, association football tournament involving Northern Ireland, Republic of Ireland, Scotland and Wales
- Taça das Nações (or "Nations' Cup") association football tournament played in Brazil in 1964
- UEFA European Nations Cup, a traditional name for the UEFA European Football Championship
- Coupe des Nations, (or "Nations' Cup") association football tournament played in Switzerland in 1930

== Hockey ==
=== Ice hockey ===
- Nations Cup (women's ice hockey), is a women's ice hockey tournament contested every year in Germany or Switzerland

=== Field hockey ===
- Women's FIH Hockey Nations Cup, an international women's field hockey tournament organised annually

=== Roller hockey ===
- Nations Cup (roller hockey), is a roller hockey tournament held in Montreux each two years

== Motor racing ==
- Australian Nations Cup Championship, a national motor racing series (2000 to 2004)

== Netball ==
- Nations Cup (netball), an annual netball competition organised by Netball Singapore
- Netball Nations Cup, a four nation international netball tournament

== Rugby ==
- World Rugby Nations Cup, an international men's rugby union competition held from 2006 to 2019.
- World Rugby Nations Cup (2026–), a second tier rugby union competition for international men's teams held since 2026.
- Women's Nations Cup (rugby union), an international women's rugby union series held from 2008 to 2013.

== Other sports ==
- Bofrost Cup on Ice, a figure skating competition known for many years as the "Nations Cup"
- FEI Nations Cup, an equestrian showjumping competition
- Nations Cup (sailing), match racing competition
- Nations Cup (snooker), professional snooker tournament
- World Under 23 Rowing Championships, formerly known as the Nations Cup
- Nations Cup (theatre on ice), an international theatre on ice competition
- World Team Cup, international team tennis championship of the ATP, formerly known as the Nations Cup

== See also ==
- Cup of Nations (disambiguation)
- European Nations' Cup (disambiguation)
- Nations Championship in rugby union
- Nations League
