= Luis Montañez (beach soccer) =

Retired American beach soccer goalkeeper

Personal information
- Full name: Luis Manuel Montañez-Maldonado
- Date of birth: July 27, 1982 (age 44)
- Place of birth: Hayward, California, U.S.
- Position: Goalkeeper

Senior career*
Years	Team	Apps	(Gls)
2010-2011	Seattle Sounders FC		
2014	Oakland Stompers		

International career^{‡}
2006-2010	U.S. Beach National Team	26	
Medal record
Men's Beach soccer
Representing United States
Gold medal – first place	2006	1st
Gold medal – first place	2007	1st
Bronze medal – third place	2008	3rd
Gold medal – first place	2009	1st
Bronze medal – third place	2010	3rd
- * Club domestic league appearances and goals ‡ National team caps and goals as of 2010

Luis Manuel Montañez-Maldonado (born July 27, 1982) is an American retired beach soccer goalkeeper. He represented the United States in international beach soccer competitions, including at the 2006 & 2007 FIFA Beach Soccer World Cup. At the national level, he is recognized for having made the most appearances by a goalkeeper in U.S. beach soccer FIFA Beach Soccer World Cup history, with six.

== International career ==
Montañez began his official FIFA regulated international career with the U.S. Beach Soccer National Team in 2006. Over a five-year span, he made 26 appearances as goalkeeper, including matches at two FIFA Beach Soccer World Cups and five CONCACAF qualifying tournaments.

=== FIFA Beach Soccer World Cup ===
He was a goalkeeper of the United States Men's National Beach Soccer Team at the 2006 and 2007 FIFA Beach Soccer World Cups, both held in Brazil. The U.S. secured group stage victories over Poland in 2006 and Iran in 2007, both considered milestones for the team at the time. The U.S. did not advance past the group stage in either tournament. His six appearances make him the most-capped goalkeeper in U.S. beach soccer history.

=== CONCACAF Beach Soccer Championship ===
Montañez took part in the 2006-2010 CONCACAF Beach Soccer Championships, accumulating 20 appearances in those tournaments. In 2006, the U.S. won the regional title and qualified for the World Cup, with a 3–0 win against Canada marking the program’s first recorded shutout. In 2009, the U.S. finished as runners-up after losing the final to Costa Rica.

== Club career ==
During the 2010–11 season, Montañez was part of the U.S.-based Seattle Sounders beach soccer squad.

In 2014 Montañez made an appearance with the Oakland Stompers, a semi-professional team in the National Premier Soccer League (NPSL).

== Post-career recognition ==
His contributions earned him consideration for inclusion in the U.S. National Soccer Hall of Fame, appearing on the Veteran Eligibility List.

== Achievements ==
Most appearances by a U.S. beach soccer goalkeeper: 6 caps.

First shutout in U.S. Beach MNT history: 3–0 vs. Canada, 2006.
