= 2018 UNCAF U-17 Interclub Cup =

Copa Interclubes Uncaf Sub-17 2018

Tournament details
- Dates: 26 November – 1 December
- Teams: 7 (from 6 associations)

Final positions
- Champions: (Costa Rica) Alajuelense (1st title)
- Runners-up: Honduras

Tournament statistics
- Matches played: 11
- Goals scored: 33 (3 per match)
- Top scorer: (Costa Rica) Paulo Rodríguez (4)

The 2018 UNCAF U-17 Interclub Cup was the 1st edition of the UNCAF U-17 Interclub Cup, Central America's under-17 club football tournament organized by UNCAF.

== Teams ==
Seven teams participated in the tournament. Honduras sent a national representative.

Association	Club
Costa Rica	Alajuelense
Costa Rica	Puntarenas
El Salvador	Águila
Guatemala	Comunicaciones
Honduras	Honduras
Nicaragua	Real Estelí
Panama	Sporting San Miguelito

== Group stage ==
=== Group A ===
Pos	Team	Pld	W	D	L	GF	GA	GD	Pts	Qualification
1	(Costa Rica) Alajuelense	3	3	0	0	8	3	+5	9	Semifinals
2	Honduras	3	1	1	1	7	7	0	4	Semifinals
3	(Nicaragua) Real Estelí	3	0	2	1	4	6	−2	2	
4	(Panama) Sporting San Miguelito	3	0	1	2	2	5	−3	1	

Updated to match(es) played on 29 November 2018. Source: UNCAF
Rules for classification: 1) Points; 2) Goal difference; 3) Goals scored.

26 November 2018 Day 1	Sporting San Miguelito (Panama)	1–3	Honduras	Alajuela
12:45	Saldívar 25'		9' 14' Medrano; 53' Barahona	Stadium: Estadio Rafael Bolaños; Referee: César Nolasco (SLV)

26 November 2018 Day 1	Alajuelense (Costa Rica)	3–1	(Nicaragua) Real Estelí	Alajuela
15:00	P. Rodríguez 27'; G. Rodríguez 23'; Álvarez 39'		61' Castillo	Stadium: Estadio Rafael Bolaños; Referee: Víctor Ríos (PAN)

27 November 2018 Day 2	Real Estelí (Nicaragua)	0–0	(Panama) Sporting San Miguelito	Alajuela
12:45				Stadium: Estadio Rafael Bolaños

27 November 2018 Day 2	Honduras	1–3	(Costa Rica) Alajuelense	Alajuela
15:00	Sierra 57'		24' Castro; 48' 66' Rodríguez	Stadium: Estadio Rafael Bolaños; Referee: Julio Luna (GUA)

28 November 2018 Day 3	Real Estelí (Nicaragua)	3–3	Honduras	Alajuela
12:45	Vásquez 18' (pen.); González 27'; Castillo 54'		16' 39' Aguilera; 64' Bonilla	Stadium: Estadio Rafael Bolaños; Referee: César Nolasco (SLV)

28 November 2018 Day 3	Alajuelense (Costa Rica)	2–1	(Panama) Sporting San Miguelito	Alajuela
15:00	Arce 65'; Rodríguez 70+5' (pen.)		50' (pen.) González	Stadium: Estadio Rafael Bolaños; Referee: Melissa Borjas (HON)

=== Group B ===
Pos	Team	Pld	W	D	L	GF	GA	GD	Pts	Qualification
1	(Guatemala) Comunicaciones	2	2	0	0	2	0	+2	6	Semifinals
2	(El Salvador) Águila	2	1	0	1	3	1	+2	3	Semifinals
3	(Costa Rica) Puntarenas	2	0	0	2	0	4	−4	0	

Updated to match(es) played on 29 November 2018. Source: UNCAF
Rules for classification: 1) Points; 2) Goal difference; 3) Goals scored.

26 November 2018 Day 1	Puntarenas (Costa Rica)	0–3	(El Salvador) Águila	Alajuela
10:30			8' Ulloa; 10' Rodríguez; 33' (pen.) Escobar	Stadium: Estadio Rafael Bolaños; Referee: Melissa Borjas (HON)

27 November 2018 Day 2	Águila (El Salvador)	0–1	(Guatemala) Comunicaciones	Alajuela
10:30			63' Cabrera	Stadium: Estadio Rafael Bolaños; Referee: Josué Ugalde (CRC)

28 November 2018 Day 3	Comunicaciones (Guatemala)	1–0	(Costa Rica) Puntarenas	Alajuela
10:30	Florián 70+1'			Stadium: Estadio Rafael Bolaños; Referee: Erick Lezama (NCA)

== Knockout stage ==
=== Semifinals ===
30 November 2018 Semifinals	Comunicaciones (Guatemala)	0–2	Honduras	Alajuela
12:00			34' Ávila; 48' Bonilla	Stadium: Estadio Rafael Bolaños; Referee: Erick Lezama (NCA)

30 November 2018 Semifinals	Alajuelense (Costa Rica)	3–2	(El Salvador) Águila	Alajuela
14:30	Rodríguez 4'; Solano 10'; Álvarez 60'		8' Martínez; 34' Escobar	Stadium: Estadio Rafael Bolaños; Attendance: Víctor Ríos (PAN)

=== Third place ===
1 December 2018 Third place	Comunicaciones (Guatemala)	2–3	(El Salvador) Águila	Alajuela
12:00				Stadium: Estadio Rafael Bolaños

=== Final ===
1 December 2018 Final	Alajuelense (Costa Rica)	1–1 (4–3 p)	Honduras	Alajuela
14:30				Stadium: Estadio Rafael Bolaños

== Top goalscorers ==
- 5 goals:

(Costa Rica) Paulo Rodríguez (Alajuelense)

- 2 goals:

Héctor Medrano (Honduras)
José Aguilera (Honduras)
Michael Bonilla (Honduras)
(El Salvador) Esly Escobar (Águila)
(Costa Rica) Fabián Álvarez (Alajuelense)
(Nicaragua) Edgar Castillo (Real Estelí)

- 1 goal:

(El Salvador) Paolo Ulloa (Águila)
(El Salvador) César Rodríguez (Águila)
(Panama) Edwin Saldívar (Sporting San Miguelito)
Moisés Barahona (Honduras)
(Costa Rica) Gabriel Rodríguez (Alajuelense)
(Guatemala) Bryan Cabrera (Comunicaciones)
Brian Sierra (Honduras)
(Costa Rica) Geancarlo Castro (Alajuelense)
(Guatemala) Xavier Florián (Comunicaciones)
(Nicaragua) Walner Vásquez (Real Estelí)
(Nicaragua) Franklin González (Real Estelí)
(Costa Rica) Juan Arce (Alajuelense)
(Panama) Adrián González (Sporting San Miguelito)
Marvin Ávila (Honduras)
(Costa Rica) Esteban Solano (Alajuelense)
(El Salvador) Roberto Martínez (Águila)
