= CONCACAF Under-13 Champions League =

Champions League U-13
- Organizer(s): CONCACAF
- Founded: 2015
- Region: Central America, North America, Caribbean
- Teams: 16
- Related competitions: CONCACAF Champions League
- Current champion(s): (United States) Philadelphia Union (1st title)
- Broadcaster: Fox Sports

The CONCACAF Champions League U13 is an annual youth continental club football invitational competition organized by CONCACAF. The goal of the competition is to develop the sport and talent of football within the CONCACAF region, which includes North and Central America, and the Caribbean. CONCACAF invites national football associations to select their best club teams to represent the country at a continental level. The under-13 tournament is the youngest age group ever to compete in an official CONCACAF event. It is officially known as Scotiabank CONCACAF U13 Champions Leagues for sponsorship reasons.

The competition was cancelled in 2020 due to the Covid-19 pandemic and has not been held since.

== History ==
The competition was initially created in 2015 and brought together 8 U-13 football clubs from 7 different countries across the CONCACAF region for a chance to compete in a professional-level, international CONCACAF sanctioned development tournament. The first competition took place from August 4, 2015, to August 8, 2015, and was held in the Cruz Azul Acoxpa Academy Training Facility. (18 teams, 128 players and 16 matches) The competition was a great experience for everyone involved and as a result, is still being executed on a yearly basis. The 2016 competition kicked off on July 23 with 16 club teams from 10 countries throughout North America, Central America and the Caribbean. The tournament took place from July 23–30, 2016 at the Universidad Intercontinental in Mexico City. The 2017 edition of the initiative starts the 5th of August in Toluca, Mexico at La Nueva Casa de Fútbol de la FMF and ends the 12th. (16 teams, 288 players, 40 matches) The 2018 edition of the Scotiabank Concacaf Under-13 Champion League will take place August 12–23, 2018, in Toluca City, Mexico (at the Federación Mexicana de Fútbol's (FEMEXFUT) Casa de Fútbol).

== Tournament Format ==
Sixteen club teams from the Caribbean, Central America and North America are divided into four groups of four teams. The tournament follows a round-robin group format which guarantees each team three group games. The top two teams in each of the four-team groups advance to the quarterfinals which are then followed by the semifinals, third-place match and final match. All games are 60 minutes in duration. The 2017 edition of the Scotiabank CONCACAF Champions League Under-13 Tournament includes a new Shield Tournament for teams who did not advance during the group stage. The Shield Tournament is completed in a round-robin format and the winning team is awarded a trophy. (2017 Shield tournament winner: Chicago Fire)

== Finals ==
Season	Winners	Score	Runners-up	Losing semi-finalists
2015	Toluca (Mexico)	4–0	(El Salvador) Chalatenango	(Mexico) UAS
2015	Toluca (Mexico)	4–0	(El Salvador) Chalatenango	(Canada) Montreal Impact
2016	FAS (El Salvador)	0–0 (5–4 a.e.t.)	(Guatemala) Comunicaciones	(Costa Rica) Alajuelense
2016	FAS (El Salvador)	0–0 (5–4 a.e.t.)	(Guatemala) Comunicaciones	???
2017	UCN (Mexico)	?–?	(Costa Rica) Alajuelense	(Mexico) Fuerza Naranja
2017	UCN (Mexico)	?–?	(Costa Rica) Alajuelense	???
2018	Los Angeles FC (United States)	2–0	(Mexico) Guadalajara	(Panama) Plaza Amador
2018	Los Angeles FC (United States)	2–0	(Mexico) Guadalajara	(Canada) Montreal Impact
2019	Philadelphia Union (United States)	2–1	(El Salvador) FAS	(Guatemala) Comunicaciones
2019	Philadelphia Union (United States)	2–1	(El Salvador) FAS	(Panama) UD Universitario
2020	Canceled due to the COVID-19 pandemic			

== Awards ==
The awards ceremony is staged on the field at the end of the final match. This opportunity gives teams and fans the feel of a professional tournament. There are several awards and prizes awarded to not on the winning team but as well as individual performance. There are 4 main types of individual awards which include the Golden Boot, the Golden Ball, the Golden Glove, and the most valuable player. The Golden Boot award goes to the top goal scorer of the tournament. The Golden Ball is presented to the outstanding player of the tournament. The Golden Glove is awarded to the most outstanding goalkeeper and the Most Valuable Player award is given to the player who demonstrates top performance among all players in the tournament. (2017: Most Valuable Player (Luis Fernado Renteria Farias/Cantera Norte), Golden Boot (Miguel Angel/Cantera Norte), Golden Glove (Dino Bontis/Toronto FC), Fair play award (CD Victoria).

2016 Champions - CD Santa Ana (SLV)

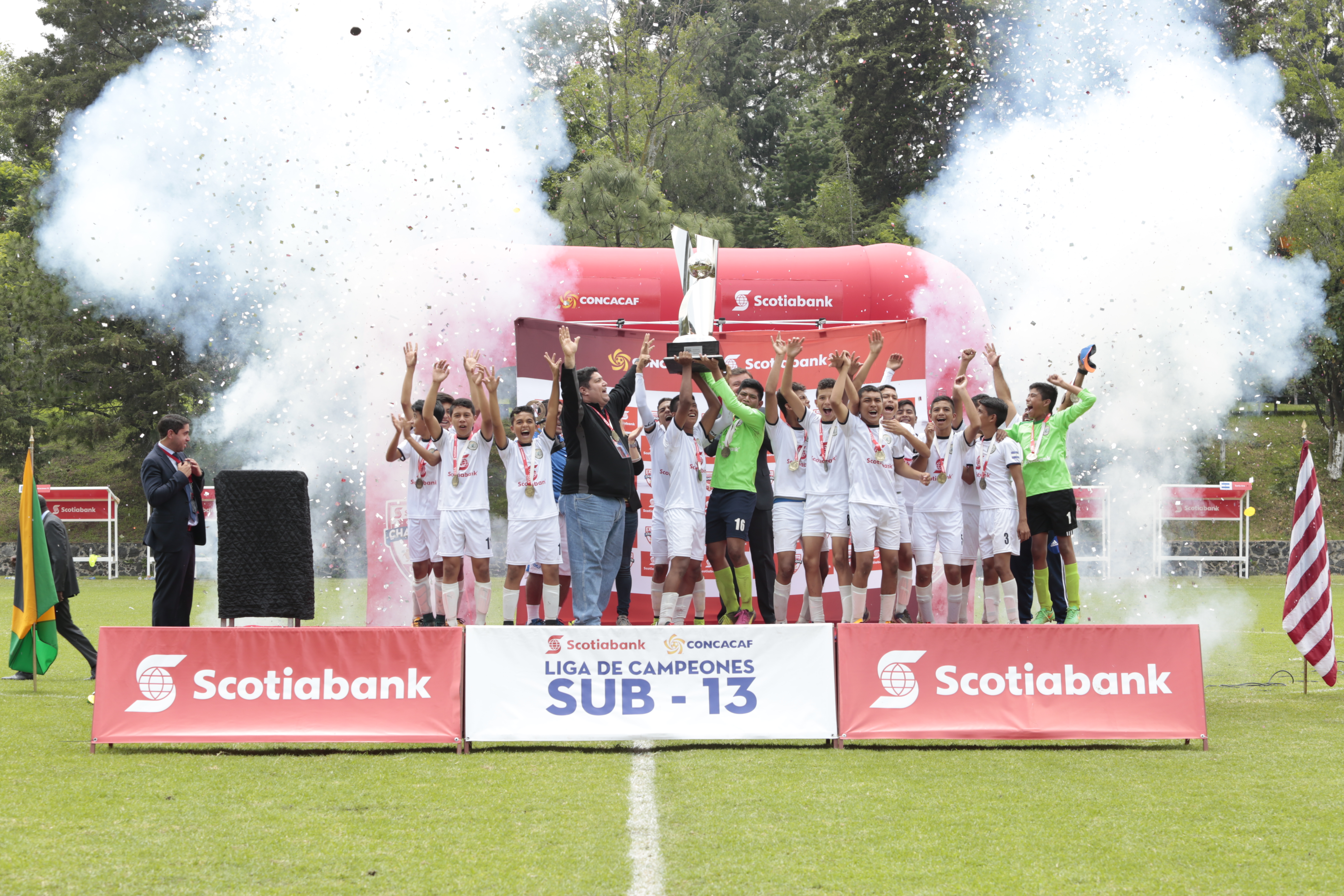

== See also ==
- UEFA Youth League
