= CONCACAF Futsal Club Championship =

- Organizer(s): CONCACAF
- Founded: 2014
- Region: North America, Central America & the Caribbean
- Teams: 6
- Current champion(s): (Costa Rica) Grupo Line Futsal (1st title)
- Most championships: (Guatemala) Glucosoral (Costa Rica) Grupo Line Futsal (1 title each)
- Website: Official website
- 2017 CONCACAF Futsal Club Championship

The CONCACAF Futsal Club Championship is the North American futsal club competition hosted by CONCACAF.

== History and format ==
The inaugural CONCACAF Futsal Club Championship was played from August 20 to 24, 2014, at the Domo Polideportivo de la CDAG at Guatemala City, Guatemala. A total of six teams participated: Glucosoral (Guatemala), Habana (Cuba), U.E.S. (El Salvador), Borussia (Costa Rica), Sidekicks (Mexico), and Futsal Club Toronto (Canada). The six teams were divided into two groups of three, playing a round-robin format during the opening round of the tournament. The top two teams of each group advanced to the semifinals, followed by the third place match and the final a day later.

== Summaries ==
Year	Host	Final			Third Place			Number of teams
Year	Host	Winner	Score	Runner-up	Third Place	Score	Fourth Place	Number of teams
2014; Details	Guatemala City	Glucosoral (Guatemala)	4–4 a.e.t. (5–4) pen.	(Costa Rica) Borussia	Sidekicks (Mexico)	1–1 a.e.t. (2–1) pen.	(Cuba) Habana	6
2017; Details	(Honduras); Tegucigalpa	Grupo Line Futsal (Costa Rica)	5–4	(United States) Elite Futsal	Soyapango F.C. (El Salvador)	4–4 a.e.t. (5–4) pen.	(Cuba) Habana	8
