= 2014 CONCACAF Futsal Club Championship =

Tournament details
- Host country: Guatemala
- City: Guatemala City
- Dates: August 20–24, 2014
- Teams: 6 (from 6 associations)
- Venue(s): 1 (in 1 host city)

Final positions
- Champions: (Guatemala) Glucosoral (1st title)
- Runners-up: (Costa Rica) Borussia
- Third place: (Mexico) Sidekicks
- Fourth place: (Cuba) Habana

Tournament statistics
- Matches played: 10
- Goals scored: 76 (7.6 per match)

The 2014 CONCACAF Futsal Club Championship was the inaugural CONCACAF Futsal Club Championship, and was played from August 20 to 24, 2014, at the Domo Polideportivo de la CDAG at Guatemala City, Guatemala.

== Participating teams ==
A total of six teams participated:

- (Canada) Futsal Club Toronto
- (Costa Rica) Borussia
- (Cuba) Habana
- (El Salvador) U.E.S.
- (Guatemala) Glucosoral
- (Mexico) Sidekicks

== Format ==
The six teams were divided into two groups of three, playing a round-robin format during the opening round of the tournament. The top two teams of each group advanced to the semifinals, followed by the third place match and the final a day later.

== Group stage ==
=== Group A ===
Pos	Team	Pld	W	D	L	GF	GA	GD	Pts	Qualification
1	(Guatemala) Glucosoral (H)	2	2	0	0	16	2	+14	6	Advance to knockout stage
2	(Cuba) Habana	2	1	0	1	3	6	−3	3	Advance to knockout stage
3	(El Salvador) U.E.S.	2	0	0	2	2	13	−11	0	

Source: CONCACAF
(H) Hosts
August 20, 2014
20:00

Glucosoral (Guatemala)	11–1	(El Salvador) U.E.S.
	Report

Domo Polideportivo de la CDAG, Guatemala City

August 21, 2014
20:00

U.E.S. (El Salvador)	1–2	(Cuba) Habana
	Report

Domo Polideportivo de la CDAG, Guatemala City

August 22, 2014
20:00

Habana (Cuba)	1–5	(Guatemala) Glucosoral
	Report

Domo Polideportivo de la CDAG, Guatemala City

=== Group B ===
Pos	Team	Pld	W	D	L	GF	GA	GD	Pts	Qualification
1	(Costa Rica) Borussia	2	2	0	0	11	4	+7	6	Advance to knockout stage
2	(Mexico) Sidekicks	2	1	0	1	6	10	−4	3	Advance to knockout stage
3	(Canada) Futsal Club Toronto	2	0	0	2	9	12	−3	0	

Source: CONCACAF
August 20, 2014
18:00

Borussia (Costa Rica)	5–0	(Mexico) Sidekicks
	Report

Domo Polideportivo de la CDAG, Guatemala City

August 21, 2014
18:00

Sidekicks (Mexico)	6–5	(Canada) Futsal Club Toronto
	Report

Domo Polideportivo de la CDAG, Guatemala City

August 22, 2014
18:00

Futsal Club Toronto (Canada)	4–6	(Costa Rica) Borussia
	Report

Domo Polideportivo de la CDAG, Guatemala City

== Knockout stage ==
=== Bracket ===
Semi-finals
23 August
(Costa Rica) Borussia	8
(Cuba) Habana	1
23 August
(Guatemala) Glucosoral	8
(Mexico) Sidekicks	2

Final
24 August
(Costa Rica) Borussia	4 (4)
(Guatemala) Glucosoral (p)	4 (5)
Third place
24 August
(Cuba) Habana	1 (1)
(Mexico) Sidekicks (p)	1 (2)

=== Semifinals ===
August 23, 2014
16:00

Borussia (Costa Rica)	8–1	(Cuba) Habana
	Report

Domo Polideportivo de la CDAG, Guatemala City

August 23, 2014
18:00

Glucosoral (Guatemala)	8–2	(Mexico) Sidekicks
	Report

Domo Polideportivo de la CDAG, Guatemala City

=== Third place match ===
August 24, 2014
16:00

Habana (Cuba)	1–1 (a.e.t.)	(Mexico) Sidekicks
	Report
Penalties
	1–2

Domo Polideportivo de la CDAG, Guatemala City

=== Final ===
August 24, 2014
18:00

Borussia (Costa Rica)	4–4 (a.e.t.)	(Guatemala) Glucosoral
	Report
Penalties
	4–5

Domo Polideportivo de la CDAG, Guatemala City
