= CONCACAF W Nations League =

International women's association football tournament

- Organiser(s): CONCACAF
- Founded: 16 September 2024; 2 years ago
- Region: North America, Central America and the Caribbean (CONCACAF)
- Related competitions: CONCACAF Nations League
- Website: www.concacaf.com/competitions/calendar-w-nations-league-apr-2028
- 2028 CONCACAF W Nations League

The CONCACAF W Nations League is an upcoming international women's football competition contested by the senior women's national teams of the member associations of CONCACAF, the regional governing body of North America, Central America, and the Caribbean. It was announced in September 2020, with the first edition to take place in 2028.

== Adoption ==
On 16 September 2024, CONCACAF announced the creation of the W Nations League. The first edition will take place in February and April 2028 (group stage), with the final tournament in November 2028.

== Format ==
The competition will feature a group stage played over two international windows, followed by a final tournament to determine the champions. The competition will act as qualifying for the CONCACAF W Gold Cup. Further details regarding the competition format will be announced in due course.

== See also ==
- CONCACAF Nations League (men's competition)
