= Cup of Nations =

Cup of Nations may refer to:

Football (soccer)

- Africa Cup of Nations, a men's international association football competition in Africa
- Afro-Asian Cup of Nations, a men's international association football competition played between the winners of the Asian Cup and African Cup of Nations
- Cup of Nations (Australia), a women's international football (soccer) tournament held by Football Australia

Roller hockey

- Nations Cup (roller hockey), a roller hockey tournament hosted in Montreux since 1921

Rugby

- 2017 Cup of Nations (rugby union), an annual international rugby union tournament
