= Soyapango F.C. =

Association football club in El Salvador

Soyapango Futbol Clube
- Full name: Soyapango Futbol Clube
- Founded: ADOC; 1986 (as for Soyapango FC)
- Ground: Cancha Jorgito Melendez; Soyapango, San Salvador Department, El Salvador
- Capacity: 1,000
- Manager: (El Salvador)
- League: ADFA San Salvador
- Grupo Centro Occidente A, 4th
| Home colours | Away colours |

Soyapango Futbol Clube is a Salvadoran professional football club based in Soyapango, San Salvador Department, El Salvador.

The club currently plays in the ADFA San Salvador.

== Honours ==
=== Domestic honours ===
==== Leagues ====
- Tercera División Salvadorean and predecessors
  - Champions (2) : N/A
  - Play-off winner (2):
- La Asociación Departamental de Fútbol Aficionado' and predecessors (4th tier)
  - Champions (1):
  - Play-off winner (2):

== List of notable players ==
- (El Salvador) Mauricio Cienfuegos

== List of coaches ==
- (El Salvador) TBD
- (El Salvador) TBD (TBD-Present)
- (El Salvador) Jose Alvarado (June 2025 -Present)
