= UNCAF U-17 Interclub Cup =

- Organising body: UNCAF
- Founded: 26 November 2018; 6 years ago
- Region: Central America
- Number of teams: 7 (from 6 associations)
- Current champions: (Costa Rica) Alajuelense
- Most successful club(s): (Costa Rica) Alajuelense (1)
- Website: UNCAF
- 2018 UNCAF U-17 Interclub Cup

The UNCAF U-17 Interclub Cup, is an annual international football competition open for domestic clubs under the age of 17 organized by UNCAF since 2018. In the present format, the tournament consists of two stages, the first stage consist of two groups of four and three teams. The winners and runners-up of each group enter the knockout stage, which consist of a semifinal round and a final.

== Editions ==
Year	Winners	Score	Runners-up	Venue
2018	Alajuelense (Costa Rica)	1–1 (4–3 pen.)	Honduras	(Costa Rica) Estadio Rafael Bolaños, Alajuela
2019				(Honduras) Estadio Emilio Williams Agasse, Choluteca
2020	CSD Municipal (Guatemala)		(Nicaragua) Real Esteli	(Honduras) Estadio Emilio Williams
2022	Plaza Amador (Panama)		Honduras AFFI Academia	(Nicaragua) Estadio Nacional de Managua

== See also ==
- UNCAF Interclub Cup
- UNCAF Women's Interclub Championship
