= Gerald Neil =

Jamaican footballer (born 1978)

Personal information
- Date of birth: 22 August 1978 (age 48)
- Place of birth: Kingston, Jamaica
- Height: 5 ft 7 in (1.70 m)
- Position: Defender

Senior career*
Years	Team	Apps	(Gls)
2002–2013	Arnett Gardens		
2013–2014	August Town	13	(0)

International career^{‡}
2003–2004	Jamaica	18	(0)
- * Club domestic league appearances and goals as of 16 July 2014 ‡ National team caps and goals as of 16 July 2014

Gerald Neil (born 22 August 1978) is former a Jamaican footballer. He currently plays for Dunbeholden F.C.

== Club career ==
Nicknamed 'Kunte', he played as a defender for Arnett Gardens and August Town.

== International career ==
He made his debut for the Reggae Boyz in 2003 against Cuba and played his last against Guatemala in 2004. He earned a total of 18 caps, scoring no goals.

== Personal life ==
Neil son, Gerald Neil Jr, is a professional footballer who currently plays for Arnett Gardens. They share the same alias “Kunta Kinte”.
