= Costa Rican Football Federation =

Governing body of association football in Costa Rica

CONCACAF
- Founded: June 13, 1921; 105 years ago
- Headquarters: San Rafael, Alajuela
- FIFA affiliation: 1927
- CONCACAF affiliation: 1961
- UNCAF affiliation: 1990
- President: Osael Maroto
- Vice-President: Vacant
- Website: fcrf.cr

The Costa Rican Football Federation (Spanish: Federación Costarricense de Fútbol, FCRF), also known as FEDEFUTBOL or FEDEFUT, is the official association football governing body in Costa Rica and is in charge of the Costa Rica national football team and the Costa Rica women's national football team.

== History ==
On June 13, 1921, the Liga Nacional de Fútbol was created by Liga Deportiva Alajuelense, Club Sport Cartaginés, Club Sport Herediano, Club Sport La Libertad, Sociedad Gimnástica Española de San José, Club Sport La Unión de Tres Ríos and Sociedad Gimnástica Limonense to direct and organize football in Costa Rica. In 1931, the league was centralized and renamed Federación Deportiva de Costa Rica, then Federación Nacional de Fútbol and then in the 1970s to Federación Costarricense de Fútbol (FEDEFUTBOL).

== Association staff ==
Name	Position	Source
(Costa Rica) Osael Maroto	President	
(Costa Rica) Sergio Idalogo	Vice President	
(Costa Rica) Gustavo Araya	General Secretary	
(Costa Rica) Elandio Carranza	Treasurer	
(Costa Rica) Gabriel Porras	Technical Director	
n/a	Team Coach (Men's)	
(Brazil) Lindsay Camila	Team Coach (Women's)	
(Costa Rica) Adrianna Duran	Media/Communications Manager	
(Costa Rica) Eduardo Pacheo	Futsal Coordinator	
(Chile) Enrique Osses	Chairperson of the Referees Committee	
(Chile) Enrique Osses	Head/Director of the Referees Department	
(Costa Rica) Hugo Cruz	Referee Coordinator	

== See also ==
- Costa Rica national football team
- Costa Rica women's national football team
- Costa Rica national under-23 football team
- Costa Rica national under-20 football team
- Costa Rica national under-17 football team
- Liga Premier Masculina de Futsal de Costa Rica

== Notes ==
1.^a The UNCAF website incorrectly lists the Costa Rican Football Federation as being founded in 1931 and affiliated in 1950.
