= 2021 CONCACAF Futsal Championship squads =

This is a list of the squads for the 2021 CONCACAF Futsal Championship that took place in Guatemala City between May 3 and 9, 2020. The 13 national teams involved in the tournament were required to register a squad of 14 players each, two of whom must be goalkeepers; only players in these squads were eligible to take part in the tournament.

Players marked (c) were named as captain for their national squad.

== Group A ==
=== Dominican Republic ===
Coach:

=== Guatemala ===
Coach:

=== Trinidad and Tobago ===
Coach:

== Group B ==
=== Mexico ===
Coach:

=== Panama ===
Coach:

=== Suriname ===
Coach:

== Group C ==
=== Canada ===
Coach: (Canada) Kyt Selaidopoulos

No.	Pos.	Player	Date of birth (age)	Caps	Goals	Club
1	GK	Josh Lemos		12	0	(United States) Milwaukee Wave
13	GK	Louis-Philippe Simard		2	0	(Canada) Spartiates Sports Club
11	DF	Daniel Chamale	16 March 1993 (aged 28)	13	1	(United States) Milwaukee Wave
3	DF	Bila Dicko-Raynauld		0	0	(Canada) Sporting Québec FC
2	DF	Eduardo Jauregui		14	1	(Canada) Toronto Idolo Futsal
4	DF	Maxime Leconte		2	0	(Canada) Spartiates Sports Club
8		Nazim Belguendouz		10	7	(Canada) Spartiates Sports Club
6		Ian Bennett		14	1	(United States) Milwaukee Wave
14		Safwane Mlah		0	0	(Canada) Sporting Montreal
10		Robert Renaud		8	0	(United States) Milwaukee Wave
7		Marco Rodriguez		8	1	(Canada) Toronto Idolo Futsal
12		Damion Graham		0	0	(Canada) Toronto Idolo Futsal
9		Frederico Moojen		8	5	(United States) Dallas Sidekicks
5		Jayzinho		0	0	free agent

=== Costa Rica ===
Coach: Carlos Quirós Álvarez

No.	Pos.	Player	Date of birth (age)	Caps	Goals	Club
1	GK	César Vargas	February 15, 1998 (age 28)			(Costa Rica) Desamparados Borussia
14	GK	Álvaro Santamaría	April 1, 1988 (age 38)			(Costa Rica) Hatillo Futsal
4	DF	Gilberth Garro	November 26, 1990 (age 35)			(Costa Rica) Barrio Peralta SJM
5	DF	Jean Carlo Salas	July 4, 1998 (age 28)			(Costa Rica) Desamparados Borussia
6	DF	Víctor Fonseca	November 16, 1992 (age 33)			(Costa Rica) Hatillo Futsal
7	DF	Edwin Cubillo	August 23, 1987 (age 39)			(Costa Rica) Desamparados Borussia
2		José Guevara	March 16, 1991 (age 35)			(Costa Rica) Barrio Peralta SJM
3		Daniel Gómez	July 8, 1994 (age 32)			(Costa Rica) Orotina Futsal
8		Alonso Cordero	May 29, 1988 (age 38)			(Costa Rica) Hatillo Futsal
10		Milinton Tijerino	September 26, 1997 (age 29)			(Costa Rica) Hatillo Futsal
11		Pablo Rodríguez	May 15, 1998 (age 28)			(Costa Rica) Hatillo Futsal
9		Mainor Cabalceta	May 24, 1994 (age 32)			(Costa Rica) Hatillo Futsal
12		Emanuel Gamboa	July 24, 1999 (age 27)			(Costa Rica) Paraíso Futsal
13		Diego Vargas	December 21, 1991 (age 34)			(Costa Rica) Esparza Futsal

=== Haiti ===
Coach:

== Group D ==
=== Cuba ===
Coach:

=== El Salvador ===
Coach:

=== Nicaragua ===
Coach:

=== United States ===
Coach: (Serbia) Dusan Jakica

No.	Pos.	Player	Date of birth (age)	Caps	Goals	Club
1	GK	Eduardo Macias	March 3, 1993 (age 33)			Unattached
2	FP	Zach Reget	May 7, 1995 (age 31)			(United States) Florida Tropics SC
3	FP	Raphael Araujo	September 18, 1985 (age 41)			(United States) NY Ecuador Futsal
4	FP	Alencar Ventura-Junior	October 7, 1992 (age 34)			(United States) Safira Futsal
5	FP	Julian Escobar	December 12, 1987 (age 38)			(United States) Harrisburg Heat
6	FP	Jeremy Klepal	December 6, 1992 (age 33)			(United States) Lansing City Futsal
7	FP	Daniel Mattos	March 20, 1986 (age 40)			(United States) Compass United Futsal
8	FP	Guilherme Veiga	April 21, 1984 (age 42)			(United States) Milwaukee Wave
9	FP	Everson Maciel	March 14, 1978 (age 48)			(United States) Safira Futsal
10	FP	Ricardo Sobreira	January 6, 1989 (age 37)			(United States) Florida Tropics SC
11	FP	Tomas Pondeca	October 10, 2001 (age 25)			(France) Paris Acasa
12	GK	Diego Moretti	September 8, 1982 (age 44)			(Italy) Petrarca Padova
13	FP	Eduardo Buenfil	September 11, 1997 (age 29)			Unattached
14	FP	Luciano Gonzalez	November 4, 1994 (age 32)			(Italy) Buldog Lucrezia
