= 2016 CONCACAF Futsal Championship squads =

CONCACAF published the final rosters on May 2, 2016.

== Canada ==
No.	Pos.	Player	Date of birth (age)	Club
1	GK	Josh Lemos	27	(Canadian Soccer Association) Toronto United Futsal
2	GK	David Campusano	31	(Canadian Soccer Association) Futsal Club Toronto
3	MF	Desmond Humphrey	36	(Canadian Soccer Association) Toronto United Futsal
4	DF	Eduardo Jauregui	32	(Canadian Soccer Association) Futsal Club Toronto
5	MF	Matias Dimarco	27	(Canadian Soccer Association) Toronto Idolo
6	MF	Ian Bennett	32	(United States Soccer Federation) Milwaukee Wave
7	DF	Vahid Assadpour	32	(United States Soccer Federation) Missouri Comets
8	MF	Nazim Belguendouz	25	(Canadian Soccer Association) FC Grenadiers
9	FW	Frederico Moojen	33	(United States Soccer Federation) St. Louis Ambush
10	MF	Marco Rodriguez	24	(Canadian Soccer Association) Toronto United Futsal
11	DF	Daniel Chamale	23	(Canadian Soccer Association) Futsal Club Toronto
12	MF	Jacob Orellana	21	(Canadian Soccer Association) Toronto Idolo
13	FW	Robert Renaud	22	(Canadian Soccer Association) Albiceleste
14	GK	Vincent Cournoyer	29	Unattached

== Costa Rica ==
No.	Pos.	Player	Date of birth (age)	Club
		Erick Brenes		(Costa Rican Football Federation) Paraíso
		Juan Cordero		(Costa Rican Football Federation) Borussia
		Edwin Cubillo		(Costa Rican Football Federation) Borrusia
		Victor Fonseca		(Costa Rican Football Federation) Goicoechea
		Gilberth Garro		(Costa Rican Football Federation) Borussia
		Christopher Molina		(Costa Rican Football Federation) Borussia
		Isaías Mora		(Costa Rican Football Federation) Goicoechea
		Alejandro Paniagua		(Costa Rican Football Federation) Barrio Peralta
		Yariel Sandí		(Costa Rican Football Federation) Goicoechea
		Alvaro Santamaría		(Costa Rican Football Federation) Barrio Peralta
		Stiven Solis		(Costa Rican Football Federation) Barrio Peralta
		Jairo Toruño		(Costa Rican Football Federation) Borussia
		Adonay Vindas		(Costa Rican Football Federation) Borussia
		Diego Zuñiga		(Costa Rican Football Federation) Borussia

== Cuba ==
No.	Pos.	Player	Date of birth (age)	Club
		Ricardo Castillo		(Football Association of Cuba) Granma
		Sandy Dominguez		(Football Association of Cuba) La Habana
		Ronald Egozcue		(Football Association of Cuba) La Habana
		Reynier Fiallo		(Football Association of Cuba) La Habana
		Daniel Hernandez		(Football Association of Cuba) Cienfuegos
		Nelson Johnston		(Football Association of Cuba) Santiago de Cuba
		Karel Mariño		(Football Association of Cuba) Holguin
		Denis Marquez		(Football Association of Cuba) Villa Clara
		Alejandro Marrero		(Football Association of Cuba) Granma
		Jhonnet Martinez		(Football Association of Cuba) La Habana
		Luis Yunior Portal		(Football Association of Cuba) La Habana
		Diego Ramirez		(Football Association of Cuba) La Habana
		Reinier Socarras		(Football Association of Cuba) La Habana
		Breniht Suarez		(Football Association of Cuba) La Habana

== Curacao ==
No.	Pos.	Player	Date of birth (age)	Club
		Djuric Ascencion		(Royal Belgian Football Association) VC Herentals
		Ashar Bernardus		(Curaçao Football Federation) Centro Dominguito
		Gino Costina		(Curaçao Football Federation) Hubentud Fortuna
		Everon Espacia		(Curaçao Football Federation) Vesta
		Germaine Geerman		(Curaçao Football Federation) Centro Dominguito
		Luidjino Hojer		(Royal Dutch Football Association) Magreb 90
		Stallone Isenia		(Curaçao Football Federation) Centro Dominguito
		Every Janzen		(Royal Dutch Football Association) Hovo Cubo
		Jamian De kaster		(Curaçao Football Federation) Victory Boys
		Jean Pauletta		(Curaçao Football Federation) Centro Dominguito
		Bryan Pereira		(Royal Belgian Football Association) Hasselt
		Jarzinho Pieter		(Curaçao Football Federation) Centro Dominguito
		Rudrick Pop		(Curaçao Football Federation) Jong Holland
		Shurwendel Roosje		(Curaçao Football Federation) Hubentud Fortuna

== Guatemala ==
No.	Pos.	Player	Date of birth (age)	Club
		Alan Aguilar		(National Football Federation of Guatemala) Glucosoral FSC
		Roberto Alvarado		(National Football Federation of Guatemala) Kinesiotape FC
		Jonatan Arevalo		(National Football Federation of Guatemala) Legendarios FSC
		Ervin Coronado		(National Football Federation of Guatemala) Glucosoral FSC
		Rafael Gonzalez		(National Football Federation of Guatemala) Glucosoral FSC
		Jose Mansilla		(National Football Federation of Guatemala) Glucosoral FSC
		Carlos Merida		(National Football Federation of Guatemala) Farmaceuticos FSC
		Rodrigo Novales		(National Football Federation of Guatemala) Legendarios FSC
		William Ramirez		(National Football Federation of Guatemala) Glucosoral FSC
		Wanderley Ruiz		(National Football Federation of Guatemala) Legendarios FSC
		Patrick Ruiz		(National Football Federation of Guatemala) Legendarios FSC
		Marvin Sandoval		(National Football Federation of Guatemala) Glucosoral FSC
		Edgar Santizo		(National Football Federation of Guatemala) Glucosoral FSC
		Miguel Santizo		(National Football Federation of Guatemala) Glucosoral FSC

== Honduras ==
No.	Pos.	Player	Date of birth (age)	Club
		Carlos Alvarado		(National Autonomous Federation of Football of Honduras) UPNFM
		Jose Amador		(National Autonomous Federation of Football of Honduras) UNAH
		Eder Cerrato		(National Autonomous Federation of Football of Honduras) UNAH
		Leonel Erazo		(National Autonomous Federation of Football of Honduras) UNAH
		Juan Hernandez		(National Autonomous Federation of Football of Honduras) UNAH
		Oscar Lopez		(National Autonomous Federation of Football of Honduras) UNICAH
		Antonio Moncada		(National Autonomous Federation of Football of Honduras) UNAH
		Carlos Montes		(National Autonomous Federation of Football of Honduras) UPNFM
		Daniel Padilla		(National Autonomous Federation of Football of Honduras) UNAH
		Luis Rivera		(National Autonomous Federation of Football of Honduras) UPNFM
		Hasser Sanchez		(National Autonomous Federation of Football of Honduras) UNICAH
		Marco Triminio		(National Autonomous Federation of Football of Honduras) UPNFM
		Oscar Valeriano		(National Autonomous Federation of Football of Honduras) UPNFM
		Norman Vega		(National Autonomous Federation of Football of Honduras) UPNFM

== Mexico ==
No.	Pos.	Player	Date of birth (age)	Club
	GK	Javier Caso		(Mexican Football Federation) Zacatepec
	GK	Alfredo Chávez		Unattached
	DF	Édgar Portilla		(Mexican Football Federation) América
	DF	Luis Castillón		(Mexican Football Federation) UNAM Premier
	DF	César Saldívar		(Mexican Football Federation) Venados
	DF	Adrián González		Unattached
	MF	Erik Tovar		(United States Soccer Federation) San Diego Sockers
	MF	Abdiel Villa		Unattached
	MF	Fausto Alemán		Unattached
	MF	Ángel Rodríguez		Unattached
	FW	Michelle Castro		Unattached
	FW	Gerardo Hernández		Unattached
	FW	Jaime Romero		Unattached
	FW	Miguel Resendes		Unattached

== Panama ==
No.	Pos.	Player	Date of birth (age)	Club
		Daniel Atencio		(Panamanian Football Federation) Perejil FC
		Joshua Brown		Unattached
		Ariel Castillo		Unattached
		Claudio Goodridge		(Panamanian Football Federation) Perejil FC
		Oscar Hinks		(Panamanian Football Federation) Municipal
		Michael De Leon		(Panamanian Football Federation) Santa Gema FC
		Jaime Londono		(Panamanian Football Federation) Municipal
		Fernando Mena		(Panamanian Football Federation) Sport West
		Jorge Perez		(Panamanian Football Federation) Perejil FC
		Carlos Perez		(Panamanian Football Federation) Perejil FC
		Edgar Rivas		(Panamanian Football Federation) Perejil FC
		Angel Sanchez		(Panamanian Football Federation) Chorrillo FC
		Jose Vasquez		(Panamanian Football Federation) Panama Oeste
		Jose Victoria		Unattached

== Trinidad and Tobago ==
No.	Pos.	Player	Date of birth (age)	Club
		Jerwyn Balthazar		(Trinidad and Tobago Football Association) Defence Force
		Bevon Bass		(Trinidad and Tobago Football Association) Point Fortin Civic Centre
		Kevaughn Connell		Unattached
		Ishmael Daniel		Unattached
		Cyrano Glen		Unattached
		Kevin Graham		(Trinidad and Tobago Football Association) Defence Force
		Keston Guy		(Trinidad and Tobago Football Association) Defence Force
		Colin Joseph		Unattached
		Kerry Joseph		(Trinidad and Tobago Football Association) Defence Force
		Jamel Lewis		Unattached
		Jameel Neptune		Morvant Caledonia F.C.
		Kareem Perry		Unattached
		Adrian Pirthysingh		Unattached
		Noel Williams		(Trinidad and Tobago Football Association) San Juan Jabloteh

== United States ==
No.	Pos.	Player	Date of birth (age)	Club
		Taylor Bond		(United States Soccer Federation) Chicago Mustangs
		Kraig Chiles		(United States Soccer Federation) San Diego Sockers
		Tony Donatelli		Unattached
		Felipe Gonzalez		(United States Soccer Federation) Las Vegas Legends MASL
		Brian Harris		(United States Soccer Federation) Missouri Comets
		Patrick Healey		(United States Soccer Federation) Baltimore Blast
		Eduardo Macias		(United States Soccer Federation) City Futsal
		Daniel Mattos		(United States Soccer Federation) Detroit Waza Flo
		Bryan Perez		(United States Soccer Federation) Missouri Comets
		Nelson Santana		(United States Soccer Federation) Syracuse Silver Knights
		Adriano Dos Santos		Unattached
		Joey Tavernese		(United States Soccer Federation) Syracuse Silver Knights
		Franck Tayou		(Mexican Football Federation) Soles de Sonora
		Danny Waltman		(United States Soccer Federation) Tacoma Stars
