= 2024 CONCACAF Futsal Championship squads =

This is a list of the squads for the 2024 CONCACAF Futsal Championship that took place in Managua, Nicaragua between 13 and 20 April 2024. The 12 national teams involved in the tournament were required to register a squad of up to 14 players, 2 of whom must be goalkeepers; only players in these squads were eligible to take part in the tournament.

== Group A ==
=== Costa Rica ===
Coach: (Costa Rica) Alex Ramos

No.	Pos.	Player	Date of birth (age)	Club
1	GK	César Rosales	15 February 1998 (aged 26)	(Costa Rican Football Federation) Borussia
2	DF	Gilbert Vindas	7 December 1997 (aged 26)	(Polish Football Association) FC Toruń
3	FW	Halleran Dixon	26 September 1998 (aged 25)	(Costa Rican Football Federation) Sporting FC
4	MF	Diego Chavarría	29 November 2002 (aged 21)	(Costa Rican Football Federation) Sporting FC
5	DF	Jean Carlo Salas	7 July 1998 (aged 25)	(Slovak Football Association) Podpor Pohyb Košice
6	DF	Víctor Fonseca	16 November 1992 (aged 31)	(Costa Rican Football Federation) RS Hatillo
7	MF	Minor Cabalceta	24 May 1994 (aged 29)	(Polish Football Association) BSF ABJ Bochnia
8	FW	Yosel León	9 May 2000 (aged 23)	(Slovak Football Association) Podpor Pohyb Košice
9	FW	Pablo Rodríguez	15 May 1998 (aged 25)	(Polish Football Association) FC Toruń
10	FW	Milinton Tijerino	26 September 1997 (aged 26)	(Polish Football Association) We-Met Futsal Club
11	FW	Daniel Gómez	8 July 1994 (aged 29)	(Costa Rican Football Federation) Orotina
12	GK	Pablo Castro	1 July 1997 (aged 26)	(Costa Rican Football Federation) RS Hatillo
13	FW	Pablo Ortega	11 August 1998 (aged 25)	(Estonian Football Association) FC NPM Silmet
14	MF	Emanuel Gamboa	24 July 1999 (aged 24)	(Costa Rican Football Federation) Paraíso

=== Haiti ===
Coach: (United States) Constantine Konstin

No.	Pos.	Player	Date of birth (age)	Club
1	GK	Jeff Dervil	27 February 1992 (aged 32)	(Haitian Football Federation) Union Hope FC
2	MF	Stevens Guillaume	29 November 2000 (aged 23)	(Haitian Football Federation) Shelcy FC
3	MF	Ritch-Andy Jean-Pierre	23 April 1995 (aged 28)	(Canadian Soccer Association) FC Sparte
4	DF	Brhorhado Borgella	11 September 2004 (aged 19)	(Haitian Football Federation) Flambeau AC
5	FW	Anthony Legendre	28 October 1996 (aged 27)	(Haitian Football Federation) Association Haïtienne de Futsal
6	MF	Alexandre Lemaire	18 January 2000 (aged 24)	(Haitian Football Federation) ADJFC
7	MF	Pierre-Rudolph Mayard	21 February 1988 (aged 36)	(Canadian Soccer Association) FC Sparte
8	MF	Shaquille Michaud	28 March 1993 (aged 31)	(Canadian Soccer Association) FC Sparte
9	MF	Angelo Simeon	19 September 2003 (aged 20)	(Haitian Football Federation) ADJFC
10	MF	Jean Schwetzer St-Hubert	15 April 1997 (aged 26)	(Haitian Football Federation) FC Kappa
11	GK	Mitchell Syla	1 August 1994 (aged 29)	(Canadian Soccer Association) FC Sparte
12	GK	Woodson Charnel	17 June 2002 (aged 21)	Unattached
13	FW	Christo-Fils Voltaire	9 January 2006 (aged 18)	(Haitian Football Federation) ADJFC
14	FW	Nicolas Waché	2 August 2002 (aged 21)	(Canadian Soccer Association) Cinque Stelle

=== Mexico ===
Coach: (Mexico) Juan Pablo Vivanco

No.	Pos.	Player	Date of birth (age)	Club
1	GK	Alfonso Rodriguez	14 April 1987 (aged 36)	
2	FW	Miguel Benitez	10 February 1996 (aged 28)	
3	MF	Elias Harari	6 February 2002 (aged 22)	
4	MF	Luis Magaña	26 April 1989 (aged 34)	
5	FW	Daniel Soltero	3 January 1997 (aged 27)	
6	FW	Eduardo Dávalos	13 October 1992 (aged 31)	
7	MF	Miguel Limón	6 August 1985 (aged 38)	
8	DF	Miguel Giorgana	18 February 1992 (aged 32)	
9	FW	Eder Giorgana	18 February 1992 (aged 32)	
10	MF	Eddie Sanchez	15 July 1997 (aged 26)	
11	DF	Abraham Atri	7 July 1988 (aged 35)	
12	GK	Gerardo Galicia-Salomón	10 August 2004 (aged 19)	
13	DF	Rigoberto Trujillo	13 April 1996 (aged 28)	
14	FW	Carlos Rivera	21 October 2004 (aged 19)	

=== Suriname ===
Coach: (Suriname) Prishad Parmessar

No.	Pos.	Player	Date of birth (age)	Club
1	GK	Gillian Borgis	12 October 2001 (aged 22)	(Surinamese Football Association) ZV Zwaluw '96
2	FP	Rivaldo Plet	11 April 2000 (aged 24)	(Surinamese Football Association) Fire Fighters
3	FP	Vangelino Sastromedjo	25 March 1984 (aged 40)	(Surinamese Football Association) ZV Osreng
4	FP	Gillian Maatrijk	3 January 1990 (aged 34)	(Surinamese Football Association) Lions
5	FP	Jaemie Naana	1 October 1996 (aged 27)	(Surinamese Football Association) Super Five
6	FP	Mohamed Goelaman	25 November 1993 (aged 30)	(Royal Dutch Football Association) Groene Ster Vlissingen
7	FP	Nazario Doesburg	11 January 1997 (aged 27)	(Surinamese Football Association) SV Kabel Boyz
8	FP	Roche Pita	15 December 1998 (aged 25)	(Surinamese Football Association) ZV Zwaluw '96
9	FP	Ike Adams	24 April 1992 (aged 31)	(Surinamese Football Association) ZV Zwaluw '96
10	FP	Giovanni Blatz	2 December 1993 (aged 30)	(Surinamese Football Association) SV Kabel Boyz
11	FP	Anthony Blijd	7 July 1994 (aged 29)	(Surinamese Football Association) SV Kabel Boyz
12	FP	Marcelinho Plet	7 April 2002 (aged 22)	(Surinamese Football Association) ZV Zwaluw '96
13	GK	Resham Panchoe	6 September 2004 (aged 19)	(Surinamese Football Association) ZV Zwaluw '96
14	FP	Lorenzo Donner	27 August 1995 (aged 28)	(Surinamese Football Association) ZVV De Ster

== Group B ==
=== Canada ===
Coach: (Canada) Kyt Selaidopoulos

No.	Pos.	Player	Date of birth (age)	Club
1	GK	John Smits	7 September 1988 (aged 35)	(Canadian Soccer Association) 9 de Octubre FC Toronto
2	FW	Samir Morsli-Mahiddine	2 September 1999 (aged 24)	(Canadian Soccer Association) Sporting Montréal FC
3	DF	Sebastian Lopez	24 November 1996 (aged 27)	(Canadian Soccer Association) Toronto Idolo
4	FW	Yassine Saad	11 June 2001 (aged 22)	(Canadian Soccer Association) Sporting Montréal FC
5	FW	Raheem Rose	13 March 1995 (aged 29)	(Canadian Soccer Association) 9 de Octubre FC Toronto
6	FW	Montacer El Harchali	3 February 2001 (aged 23)	(Canadian Soccer Association) Sporting Montréal FC
7	DF	Abdel Nboucha	1 June 1994 (aged 29)	(Canadian Soccer Association) Sporting Montréal FC
8	FW	Aylan Khenoussi	14 December 2001 (aged 22)	(Canadian Soccer Association) Sporting Montréal FC
9	FW	Loïc Kwemi	2 March 1997 (aged 27)	(Canadian Soccer Association) Évolution Futsal Club Montréal
10	FW	Safwane Mlah	8 December 2001 (aged 22)	(Canadian Soccer Association) Sporting Montréal FC
11	DF	Daniel Chamale	16 March 1993 (aged 31)	(Canadian Soccer Association) 9 de Octubre FC Toronto
12	GK	Callum Weir	21 October 2003 (aged 20)	(Canadian Soccer Association) Whitehorse Yukon Selects FC
13	FW	Mahdi Djellab	28 June 2003 (aged 20)	(Canadian Soccer Association) Albi Sve Montréal
14	DF	Obeng Tabi	28 October 2000 (aged 23)	(Canadian Soccer Association) Sporting Montréal FC

=== Cuba ===
Coach: (Cuba) Osmel Valdivia

No.	Pos.	Player	Date of birth (age)	Club
1	GK	Kevin Rueda	27 December 2003 (aged 20)	(Football Association of Cuba) Ciego de Ávila
2	GK	Lipsam Sánchez	6 February 2008 (aged 16)	(Football Association of Cuba) La Habana
3	MF	Cristian Óscar	24 April 2002 (aged 21)	(Football Association of Cuba) Holguín
4	DF	Jorge González	5 February 2002 (aged 22)	(Football Association of Cuba) La Habana
5	MF	José Morales	29 May 2000 (aged 23)	(Football Association of Cuba) La Habana
6	DF	Harold Aguilera	1 January 2002 (aged 22)	(Football Association of Cuba) Camagüey
7	MF	Christian Valiente	11 July 2001 (aged 22)	(Football Association of Cuba) Holguín
8	MF	Lázaro Castro	17 September 1996 (aged 27)	(Football Association of Cuba) Pinar del Río
9	FW	Jonathan Hernández	23 February 2001 (aged 23)	(Football Association of Cuba) La Habana
10	MF	Iduan Martínez	25 February 2000 (aged 24)	(Football Association of Cuba) La Habana
11	MF	Dayan Cotilla	2 July 1999 (aged 24)	(Football Association of Cuba) La Habana
12	GK	Leonardo Hirrezuelo	4 September 2001 (aged 22)	(Football Association of Cuba) La Habana
13	MF	Diego Ramírez	3 November 1998 (aged 25)	(Royal Spanish Football Federation) Ribarroja
14	FW	Bárbaro Álvarez	17 April 2003 (aged 20)	(Football Association of Cuba) Ciego de Ávila

=== Nicaragua ===
Coach: (Nicaragua) Carlos Sotela

No.	Pos.	Player	Date of birth (age)	Club
1	GK	Asdierick Roca	12 March 2004 (aged 20)	(Nicaraguan Football Federation) Juventus FC
2	DF	Marcelo Alvarado	3 August 2002 (aged 21)	(Nicaraguan Football Federation) Uni Futsal
3	MF	Manuel Mejía	6 May 2002 (aged 21)	(Nicaraguan Football Federation) Sport Spirit
4	DF	Patrick Luna	9 August 1998 (aged 25)	(Nicaraguan Football Federation) Chelsea Masaya
5	MF	William Barrientos	8 March 1999 (aged 25)	(Nicaraguan Football Federation) Cheyenes JC LT
6	MF	Wesley Ruíz	15 July 2002 (aged 21)	(Nicaraguan Football Federation) Uni Futsal
7	MF	Lester Kripp	13 December 1998 (aged 25)	(Nicaraguan Football Federation) Uni Futsal
8	MF	Marcos Chávez	24 March 1999 (aged 25)	(Nicaraguan Football Federation) Cheyenes JC LT
9	FW	Exequiel Sequeira	23 August 2000 (aged 23)	(Nicaraguan Football Federation) UNAN Managua
10	DF	Adaly Lacayo	27 September 1992 (aged 31)	(Nicaraguan Football Federation) Guacer FC
11	MF	Bryan Corea	18 October 2000 (aged 23)	(Nicaraguan Football Federation) Guacer FC
12	GK	Ruddy Rodríguez	13 December 1995 (aged 28)	(Nicaraguan Football Federation) Santa Emilia
13	MF	Roberto Díaz	15 August 2004 (aged 19)	(Nicaraguan Football Federation) Uni Futsal
14	FW	Franklin Palacios	22 March 2003 (aged 21)	(Nicaraguan Football Federation) Juventus FC

=== Panama ===
Coach: (Panama) Alex Del Rosario

No.	Pos.	Player	Date of birth (age)	Club
1	GK	Jaime Peñaloza	3 May 1997 (aged 26)	(Panamanian Football Federation) CD Los Lobos
2	DF	José Caballero	27 August 1996 (aged 27)	(Panamanian Football Federation) Villa 9
3	DF	Óscar Hinks	20 September 1985 (aged 38)	(Panamanian Football Federation) CD Milenio
4	DF	José Escobar	7 February 2000 (aged 24)	(Panamanian Football Federation) CD Milenio
5	MF	Abdiel Escobar	28 May 1995 (aged 28)	(Costa Rican Football Federation) AD Corredores
6	MF	Abdiel Ortiz	1 July 1996 (aged 27)	(Panamanian Football Federation) CD Los Lobos
7	MF	Claudio Goodridge	2 January 1990 (aged 34)	(Panamanian Football Federation) Villa 9
8	MF	Ruman Milord	4 May 1998 (aged 25)	(Panamanian Football Federation) CD Los Lobos
9	FW	Aquiles Campos	13 November 1991 (aged 32)	(Panamanian Football Federation) CD Los Lobos
10	DF	Alfonso Maquensi	7 August 1997 (aged 26)	(Panamanian Football Federation) Villa 9
11	FW	Abdiel Castrellón	19 July 1991 (aged 32)	(Panamanian Football Federation) Perejil FC
12	GK	José Alvarez	29 October 1990 (aged 33)	(Panamanian Football Federation) Villa 9
13	MF	Allan Aparicio	12 May 2001 (aged 22)	Unattached
14	FW	Cuthbert Boxill	20 March 1997 (aged 27)	(Panamanian Football Federation) Villa 9

== Group C ==
=== Dominican Republic ===
Coach: (Spain) Fernando Antonio Ballester

No.	Pos.	Player	Date of birth (age)	Club
1	GK	Dimar Blanco	18 September 1997 (aged 26)	(The Football Association) Bloomsbury Futsal
2	MF	Juan Rondón	3 August 2003 (aged 20)	(Italian Football Federation) Heracles Formia C5
3	DF	Uriel Cepeda	15 November 2002 (aged 21)	(Argentine Football Association) Pinocho
4	DF	Christian Gardelli	17 July 1997 (aged 26)	(Italian Football Federation) A.S.D. Futsal Cesena
5	MF	Ricardo Álvarez	22 April 1997 (aged 26)	(Dominican Football Federation) Turia FC
6	MF	David Rondón	26 October 1988 (aged 35)	(French Football Federation) GOAL FC
7	MF	Héctor Pérez	13 November 1998 (aged 25)	(Royal Spanish Football Federation) Albacete Fútbol Sala
8	MF	José Belliard	2 October 1996 (aged 27)	(Colombian Football Federation) Independiente Barranquilla
9	MF	Marco Gómez	25 April 1991 (aged 32)	(Royal Spanish Football Federation) CFS La Unión
10	DF	Guillermo López	22 March 1995 (aged 29)	(Royal Spanish Football Federation) Athletic Vilatorrada
11	DF	Marselle Cestero	25 December 1991 (aged 32)	(Royal Spanish Football Federation) FS Diagonal
12	GK	José Pérez	4 August 2003 (aged 20)	(The Football Association) York Futsal
13	DF	Javier Pepen	27 May 1998 (aged 25)	(Dominican Football Federation) Turia FC
14	MF	Granci Moscoso	23 March 1988 (aged 36)	(Italian Football Federation) Venezia FC

=== Guatemala ===
Coach: (Guatemala) Eduardo Estrada

No.	Pos.	Player	Date of birth (age)	Club
1	GK	Angel Mazariegos	29 April 1999 (aged 24)	(National Football Federation of Guatemala) Legendarios
2	GK	José Reyes	20 November 1995 (aged 28)	(National Football Federation of Guatemala) Tellioz
3	DF	Jenner Paniagua	27 December 1997 (aged 26)	(National Football Federation of Guatemala) Legendarios
4	FW	Nelson Tagre	25 January 2000 (aged 24)	(National Football Federation of Guatemala) Glucusoral
5	MF	Edgar Santizo	2 February 1987 (aged 37)	(National Football Federation of Guatemala) Glucusoral
6	MF	José Marin	25 January 1992 (aged 32)	(National Football Federation of Guatemala) Tellioz
7	MF	Roberto Alvarado	2 December 1997 (aged 26)	(National Football Federation of Guatemala) Glucosoral
8	MF	Patrick Ruiz	10 January 1993 (aged 31)	(National Football Federation of Guatemala) Legendarios
9	MF	Marvin Sandoval	22 March 1989 (aged 35)	(National Football Federation of Guatemala) Glucosoral
10	DF	Wanderley Ruiz	9 August 1995 (aged 28)	(National Football Federation of Guatemala) Legendarios
11	DF	Alan Aguilar	2 December 1989 (aged 34)	(National Football Federation of Guatemala) Glucosoral
12	MF	Jhony Diaz	18 March 2001 (aged 23)	(National Football Federation of Guatemala) Glucosoral
13	FW	Fernando Campaignac	13 June 1994 (aged 29)	(National Football Federation of Guatemala) Glucosoral
14	MF	Bryan Santizo	31 January 1995 (aged 29)	(National Football Federation of Guatemala) Tellioz

=== Trinidad and Tobago ===
Coach: (Trinidad and Tobago) Paul Decle

No.	Pos.	Player	Date of birth (age)	Club
1	GK	Andre Marchan	11 August 1990 (aged 33)	(Trinidad and Tobago Football Association) Defence Force FC
2	GK	Kelvin Henry	20 October 1992 (aged 31)	(Trinidad and Tobago Football Association) Prisons FC
3	DF	Michel Poon-Angeron	19 April 2001 (aged 22)	(Trinidad and Tobago Football Association) AC Port of Spain
4	MF	Che Benny	18 August 2000 (aged 23)	(Trinidad and Tobago Football Association) AC Port of Spain
5	MF	Matthew Woo Ling	15 September 1996 (aged 27)	(Trinidad and Tobago Football Association) Defence Force FC
6	FW	Darius Ollivierra	11 November 1996 (aged 27)	(Trinidad and Tobago Football Association) Defence Force FC
7	FW	Sedale McLean	8 April 1994 (aged 30)	(Trinidad and Tobago Football Association) AC Port of Spain
8	DF	Dylan King	17 January 1994 (aged 30)	(Trinidad and Tobago Football Association) Defence Force FC
9	MF	Jameel Neptune	19 July 1993 (aged 30)	(Trinidad and Tobago Football Association) AC Port of Spain
10	MF	Shane Hospedales	25 August 1991 (aged 32)	(Trinidad and Tobago Football Association) Central FC
11	MF	Adrian Welch	5 September 1995 (aged 28)	(German Football Association) SV Berolina Stralau
12	FW	Jerwyn Balthazar	17 December 1982 (aged 41)	(Trinidad and Tobago Football Association) Defence Force FC
13	DF	Kareem Perry	15 August 1986 (aged 37)	(Trinidad and Tobago Football Association) Police FC
14	MF	Jelani Felix	22 November 1993 (aged 30)	(Trinidad and Tobago Football Association) Defence Force FC

=== United States ===
Coach: (Brazil) Hewerton Moreira

No.	Pos.	Player	Date of birth (age)	Club
1	GK	Robert Damron	25 March 2002 (aged 22)	
2	FW	Manuel Andrade	28 July 1993 (aged 30)	
3	MF	Nilton de Andrade	10 March 1998 (aged 26)	(United States Soccer Federation) Utica City FC
4	MF	Alencar Ventura-Junior	18 September 1985 (aged 38)	
5	DF	Luciano Gonzalez	4 November 1994 (aged 29)	(Italian Football Federation) Sammichele 1992
6	MF	Sebastian Mendez	6 March 2001 (aged 23)	(United States Soccer Federation) Texas Outlaws
7	MF	Diego Burato	10 September 1988 (aged 35)	
8	FW	Franck Tayou	16 April 1990 (aged 33)	(United States Soccer Federation) Utica City FC
9	DF	Raphael Araujo	7 October 1985 (aged 38)	(United States Soccer Federation) St. Louis Ambush
10	MF	David Ortiz	20 September 2000 (aged 23)	(United States Soccer Federation) Texas Outlaws
11	FW	Luiz Morales	23 October 1999 (aged 24)	(United States Soccer Federation) Texas Outlaws
12	GK	Diego Moretti	8 September 1982 (aged 41)	
13	MF	Nicolas Lopez	19 June 2002 (aged 21)	(Italian Football Federation) Ciampino Futsal
14	DF	Erik Macias	21 September 1996 (aged 27)	(United States Soccer Federation) Texas Outlaws
