= 2012 CONCACAF Futsal Championship =

Tournament details
- Host country: Guatemala
- Dates: 2–8 July
- Teams: 8 (from 1 confederation)
- Venue: 1 (in 1 host city)

Final positions
- Champions: Costa Rica (2nd title)
- Runners-up: Guatemala
- Third place: Panama
- Fourth place: Mexico

Tournament statistics
- Matches played: 16
- Goals scored: 109 (6.81 per match)

The 2012 CONCACAF Futsal Championship was the fifth edition of the main international futsal tournament of the North and Central America and the Caribbean region. It took place in Guatemala City, Guatemala from 2 to 8 July 2012.

The tournament served as a qualifying tournament for the 2012 FIFA Futsal World Cup in Thailand.

== Qualifying ==
=== CFU (Caribbean Football Union) qualifying tournament ===
Saint Kitts and Nevis advanced automatically to the final round of a 2012 CONCACAF Futsal Championship after the Dominican Republic, Guyana, Haiti and Trinidad & Tobago withdrew from regional qualifying. Cuba was to host a Caribbean qualifying event 17–23 February.

=== Playoff ===
Canada and El Salvador competed for the fourth spot in Group A.

Team 1	Agg.	Team 2	1st leg	2nd leg
Canada	7–6	El Salvador	1–4	6–2

28 June 2012

Canada	1–4	El Salvador
Elliot 3'		Rosales 3', 19', 27', 36'

Domo Polideportivo
Guatemala City, Guatemala

29 June 2012

El Salvador	2–6	Canada
Rosales 32', 40'		Chavez 14' (o.g.); Yaques 14'; Laliberté 22'; Elliot 26'; Rios 40'; Lemos 40'

Domo Polideportivo
Guatemala City, Guatemala

== Championship ==
The eight participating teams were divided into two groups of four which each played on a single round-robin format. The top two teams of each group advanced to semi-finals. The top four teams from the tournament earned participation at the 2012 Futsal World Cup. The draw was held on 12 April 2012 at the Intercontinental Hotel in Guatemala City. The schedule of matches was released on 23 April 2012.

=== Group A ===
Team	Pld	W	D	L	GF	GA	GD	Pts
Guatemala	3	3	0	0	14	6	+8	9
Panama	3	2	0	1	15	12	+3	6
United States	3	1	0	2	6	9	-3	3
Canada	3	0	0	3	10	18	-8	0

2 July 2012
18:00

United States	2–5	Panama
Perez 15'; Chiles 27'		Lasso 6', 14', 15', 39'; Alvarado 40'

Domo Polideportivo
Guatemala City, Guatemala

2 July 2012
20:00

Guatemala	7–3	Canada

Domo Polideportivo
Guatemala City, Guatemala

3 July 2012
18:00

Canada	2–3	United States
Xavier 7'; Bennett 30'		Healey 17'; Pérez 30'; Chiles 33'

Domo Polideportivo
Guatemala City, Guatemala
Referee: Antonio Alvarez (Cuba)

3 July 2012
20:00

Guatemala	5–2	Panama
Acevedo 1', 29'; De Leon 14', 27'; Estrada 24'		Bello 31'; Goodridge 32'

Domo Polideportivo
Guatemala City, Guatemala
Referee: Eduardo Hernandez (Mexico)

4 July 2012
18:00

Panama	8–5	Canada

Domo Polideportivo
Guatemala City, Guatemala
4 July 2012
20:00

Guatemala	2–1	United States
Gonzalez 4'; Aguilar 34'		Stewart 10'

Domo Polideportivo
Guatemala City, Guatemala
Referee: Hector Mesen (Costa Rica)

=== Group B ===
Team	Pld	W	D	L	GF	GA	GD	Pts
Costa Rica	3	2	1	0	13	6	+7	7
Mexico	3	2	1	0	14	9	+5	7
Cuba	3	1	0	2	12	7	+5	3
Saint Kitts and Nevis	3	0	0	3	5	22	-17	0

2 July 2012
10:00

Mexico	4–4	Costa Rica

Domo Polideportivo
Guatemala City, Guatemala
2 July 2012
12:00

Saint Kitts and Nevis	0–10	Cuba

Domo Polideportivo
Guatemala City, Guatemala

3 July 2012
10:00

Mexico	5–4	Saint Kitts and Nevis
Ramirez Vasquez 7'; Cati 17'; Angel 19', 35'; Gonzalez 40'		Ramirez Vasquez 7' (o.g.); Lake 9'; Nurse 10'; Somersall 19'

Domo Polideportivo
Guatemala City, Guatemala
Referee: Leroy Brown (Guatemala)

3 July 2012
12:00

Cuba	1–2	Costa Rica
Olivera 35'		Paniagua 21'; Brenes 32'

Domo Polideportivo
Guatemala City, Guatemala
Referee: Alexander Cline Beteta (Panama)

4 July 2012
10:00

Costa Rica	7–1	Saint Kitts and Nevis

Domo Polideportivo
Guatemala City, Guatemala
4 July 2012
12:00

Cuba	1–5	Mexico

Domo Polideportivo
Guatemala City, Guatemala

== Knockout stage ==
Semi-finals
6 July 2012 – Guatemala City
Costa Rica	4
Panama	1
6 July 2012 – Guatemala City
Guatemala	3
Mexico	0

Final
8 July 2012 – Guatemala City
Costa Rica	3
Guatemala	2
Third place
8 July 2012 – Guatemala City
Panama (a.e.t.)	6
Mexico	4

=== Semi-finals ===
6 July 2012
18:00

Costa Rica	4–1	Panama

Domo Polideportivo
Guatemala City, Guatemala

6 July 2012
20:00

Guatemala	3–0	Mexico

Domo Polideportivo
Guatemala City, Guatemala

=== Third place play-off ===
8 July 2012
16:00

Panama	6–4 (a.e.t.)	Mexico

Domo Polideportivo
Guatemala City, Guatemala

=== Final ===
8 July 2012
18:00

Costa Rica	3–2	Guatemala

Domo Polideportivo
Guatemala City, Guatemala

== Winner ==
2012 CONCACAF champion

Costa Rica
Second title

== Final standing ==
Place	Team
1	Costa Rica
2	Guatemala
3	Panama
4	Mexico
5	Cuba
6	United States
7	Canada
8	Saint Kitts and Nevis

Team qualified for the 2012 FIFA Futsal World Cup

== Top goalscorers ==
The top 10 scorers from the 2012 CONCACAF Futsal Championship are as follows:

Rank	Name	Country	Goals
1	Miguel Lasso	Panama	6
2	Humberto Armando Escobar	Guatemala	5
3	Miguel Angel Limon	Mexico	4
3	Eduardo Morales	Cuba	4
5	Jorge Arias	Costa Rica	3
5	Jose Rafael Gonzalez	Guatemala	3
5	Oscar Hinks	Panama	3
5	Aaron Gerardo Jerez	Costa Rica	3
5	Yulier Olivera	Cuba	3
5	Matthew Rios	Canada	3
