= Canada men's national futsal team =

Canada
- Shirt badge/Association crest
- Association: Canadian Soccer Association
- Confederation: CONCACAF
- Head coach: Kyt Selaidopoulos
- FIFA code: CAN
- FIFA ranking: 70 ▲1 (24 September 2026)
Home colours	Away colours

First international
- Argentina 3–1 Canada ('s-Hertogenbosch, Netherlands; January 6, 1989)

Biggest win
- Japan 2–6 Canada (Leeuwarden, Netherlands; January 8, 1989) El Salvador 2–6 Canada (Guatemala City, Guatemala; June 29, 2012)

Biggest defeat
- Brazil 18–0 Canada (Lages, Brazil; October 21, 2007)

FIFA World Cup
- Appearances: 1 (First in 1989)
- Best result: 12th place (1989)

AMF World Cup
- Appearances: 7 (First in 1985)
- Best result: 11th place (1985)

CONCACAF Championship
- Appearances: 4 (First in 2012)
- Best result: 6th place (2016, 2021)

Grand Prix de Futsal
- Appearances: 1 (First in 2008)
- Best result: 16th place (2008)

The Canadian national futsal team represents Canada in international men's futsal competitions. They are overseen by the Canadian Soccer Association, the governing body for soccer in Canada.

Their first FIFA sanctioned international was played in 's-Hertogenbosch, Netherlands at the 1989 FIFA Futsal World Cup against Argentina. The match resulted in a 3–1 loss. Their most recent tournament was the 2024 CONCACAF Futsal Championship.

== Results and fixtures ==
The following is a list of match results in the last 12 months, as well as any future matches that have been scheduled.

Legend

Win Draw Loss Fixture

== Players ==
=== Current squad ===
The following players were called up to the squad for the 2024 CONCACAF Futsal Championship in Managua, Nicaragua. The team played against group stage matches against Cuba on 13 April, Panama on 14 April, and Nicaragua on 15 April, as well as a quarter-final match against Costa Rica on April 17. The tournament also served as qualifying for the 2024 FIFA Futsal World Cup that will take place in Uzbekistan scheduled in September 2024.

No.	Pos.	Player	Date of birth (age)	Caps	Goals	Club
1	GK	John Smits	September 7, 1988 (age 38)			(Canadian Soccer Association) 9 de Octubre FC Toronto
12	GK	Callum Weir	October 21, 2003 (age 23)			(Canadian Soccer Association) Yukon Selects FC
11	DF	Daniel Chamale	March 16, 1993 (age 33)			(Canadian Soccer Association) 9 de Octubre FC Toronto
3	DF	Sebastian Lopez	November 24, 1996 (age 29)			(Canadian Soccer Association) Toronto Idolo
7	DF	Abdel Nboucha	(age 29)			(Canadian Soccer Association) Sporting Montréal FC
14	DF	Obeng Tabi	October 28, 2000 (age 26)			(Canadian Soccer Association) Sporting Montréal FC
13	FW	Mahdi Djellab	June 28, 2003 (age 23)			(Canadian Soccer Association) Albi Sve Montréal
6	FW	Montacer El Harchali	February 3, 2001 (age 25)			(Canadian Soccer Association) Sporting Montréal FC
8	FW	Aylan Khenoussi	December 14, 2001 (age 24)			(Canadian Soccer Association) Sporting Montréal FC
9	FW	Loïc Kwemi	March 2, 1997 (age 29)			(Canadian Soccer Association) Évolution Futsal Club Montréal
10	FW	Safwane Mlah	December 8, 2001 (age 24)			(Canadian Soccer Association) Sporting Montréal FC
2	FW	Samir Morsli-Mahiddine	September 2, 1999 (age 27)			(Canadian Soccer Association) Sporting Montréal FC
5	FW	Raheem Rose	March 13, 1995 (age 31)			(Canadian Soccer Association) 9 de Octubre FC Toronto
4	FW	Yassine Saad	June 11, 2001 (age 25)			(Canadian Soccer Association) Sporting Montréal FC

=== Previous squads ===
CONCACAF Futsal Championship

- 2016 CONCACAF Futsal Championship squad
- 2021 CONCACAF Futsal Championship squad
- 2024 CONCACAF Futsal Championship squad

== Competitive record ==
Tournament	Final placing
(Spain) 1985 FIFUSA Futsal World Cup	11th
(Australia) 1988 FIFUSA Futsal World Cup	13th
(Netherlands) 1989 FIFA Futsal World Cup	12th
(Italy) 1991 FIFUSA Futsal World Cup	18th
(Argentina) 1994 FIFUSA Futsal World Cup	16th
(Paraguay) 2003 AMF Futsal Men's World Cup	16th
(United States) Futsal Goal Cup 2003	3rd
(Panama) 2004 CONCACAF Futsal Championship Qualifying Playoff	Lost (Note: This tournament was a two game aggregate score playoff to determine a qualifier for the 2004 CONCACAF Futsal Championship.)
(Argentina) 2007 AMF Futsal Men's World Cup	12th
(Brazil) 2008 Grand Prix de Futsal	16th
(Colombia) 2011 AMF Futsal Men's World Cup	14th
(Guatemala) 2012 CONCACAF Futsal Championship Qualifying Playoff	Won (Note: This tournament was a two game, aggregate score playoff to determine the qualifier for the fourth spot in Group A at the 2012 CONCACAF Futsal Championship.)
(Guatemala) 2012 CONCACAF Futsal Championship	7th
(Costa Rica) 2016 CONCACAF Futsal Championship North American Zone Qualification	Won (Note: This tournament was a two game, aggregate score playoff to determine the second qualifier from the North American Zone for the 2016 CONCACAF Futsal Championship.)
(Costa Rica) 2016 CONCACAF Futsal Championship	6th
(Costa Rica) 2021 CONCACAF Futsal Championship	6th
(Nicaragua) 2024 CONCACAF Futsal Championship	8th

== See also ==
- Futsal Canadian Championship
- Canada men's national soccer team
- Canada men's national beach soccer team
- Soccer in Canada

== Head-to-head record ==
The following table shows Canada's head-to-head record in the FIFA Futsal World Cup.

Opponent	Pld	W	D	L	GF	GA	GD	Win %
Argentina	1	0	0	1	1	3	−2	0.00
Belgium	1	0	0	1	0	2	−2	0.00
Japan	1	1	0	0	6	2	+4	100.00
Total	3	1	0	2	7	7	+0	33.33
