= Futsal Canadian Championship =

- Founded: 2015
- First season: 2015
- Country: Canada
- Confederation: CONCACAF / FIFA
- Number of clubs: 8
- Most championships: 9 de Octubre; Sporting Montreal FC; Toronto Idolo Futsal (2 titles)
- Broadcaster: FIFA+
- Website: Official website

Futsal Canadian Championship is the futsal national club competition. Its first year featured two teams from Quebec and Ontario. The competition is under the authority of the Canada Soccer Association.

== History ==
The inaugural season was played in 2015 at Centre d'éducatif des adultes Outremont with Futsal Club Toronto and Albiceleste participating. The most recent edition featured eight clubs in 2019 and was won by Toronto Idolo. The 2020 and 2021 tournaments were cancelled due to the COVID-19 pandemic.

The 2016 tournament was held at the University of Ontario Institute of Technology while the 2017-2019 editions were held at the Athletic Recreation Complex at Queen's University in Kingston. 2022 was held at the Centre Sportif de Gatineau in Gatineau, Quebec, and 2023 at the Seven Chiefs Sportsplex in Calgary, Alberta. 2023 season also added a women's championship, won by Xtrême from Quebec in a field of eight teams.

The all-time participating teams have come from British Columbia, Yukon, Alberta, Nunavut, Saskatchewan, Manitoba, Ontario, and Quebec.

== Past winners ==
=== Men's champions ===
Season	Winners	Score	Runners-up	Scorers	MVP	Venue
2015	Futsal Club Toronto	7-5; 6-2	Albiceleste FC Laval			Montréal, Québec; Outremont
2016	Toronto United Futsal	4-3; 4-3	Montréal Sparte FC			Oshawa, Ontario; Durham College
2017	Montréal Sporting Outlaws FC	7-3	Saskatoon Olimpia SK FC		Diyaeddine Abzi	Kingston, Ontario; Queen's University
2018	Toronto Idolo Futsal	6-1	Sporting Montréal FC		Luigi Caruso	Kingston, Ontario; Queen's University
2019	Toronto Idolo Futsal	5-5 (a.e.t.); 3-2(p)	Sporting Montréal FC		Luis Rocha	Kingston, Ontario; Queen's University
2022	Sporting Montréal FC	6-3	Toronto Idolo Futsal		Shaquille Michaud	Gatineau, Québec; Centre sportif Gatineau
2023	9 de Octubre FC Toronto	5-3	Sporting Montréal FC		Raheem Rose	Calgary, Alberta; 7 Chiefs
2024	9 de Octubre FC Toronto	5-3	Sporting Montréal FC		Andy Baquero	Calgary, Alberta; 7 Chiefs
2025	9 de Octubre FC Toronto	2-3	Atlético Gatineau			Regina, Saskatchewan Brandt Centre

=== Women's champions ===
Season	Winners	Score	Runners-up	Scorers	MVP	Venue
2023	Montréal Xtreme ADR	3-2	Scarborough GS United		Sophie Thérien	Calgary, Alberta; 7 Chiefs

== Top goalscorers ==
Season	Player	Team	Goals
2015	(Canada) Timo Garzon	Futsal Club Toronto	3
2015	(Canada) Alvaro Yaques	Futsal Club Toronto	3
2016	(Canada) Desmond Humphrey	Toronto United Futsal	2
2016	(Canada) Marco Rodriguez	Toronto United Futsal	2
2016	(Canada) Jonathan Osorio	Toronto United Futsal	2
2017	(Canada) Diyaeddine Abzi	Sporting de Montreal	8
2018	(Canada) Damion Graham	Toronto Idolo Futsal	13
2019	(Canada) Luis Rocha	Toronto Idolo Futsal	11

== See also ==
- Canada men's national futsal team
- Canada men's national soccer team
- Canada national beach soccer team
- Soccer in Canada
