= Nick Bontis =

Canadian academic and sports executive

- Bontis in 2004

35th President of the Canadian Soccer Association
- In office November 21, 2020 – February 27, 2023
- Preceded by: Steve Reed
- Succeeded by: Charmaine Crooks

Personal details
- Born: May 27, 1969 (age 57) Toronto, Ontario, Canada
- Spouse: Stacy Bontis (m. 2001)
- Children: 3
- Education: BA (HBA) 1992, PhD (1999)
- Alma mater: Ivey Business School; University of Western Ontario
- Website: https://www.nickbontis.com/

Nick Bontis (born May 27, 1969) is a Canadian academic and sports executive. He is associate professor and chair of strategic management at the DeGroote School of Business, McMaster University in Hamilton, Ontario.

== Playing career ==
In 1985, Bontis played in the U16 Championship Final of The Robbie tournament at Birchmount Stadium for Scarborough Maple Leaf. In 1992, he was a member of the five-time winning Ontario Cup champions Scarborough Azzurri. In 1996, he played semi-pro for London City in the CNSL (Canadian National Soccer League). In 1997, Bontis led the Premier Division of the WOSL (Western Ontario Soccer League) in goals while playing for London Portuguese. Toward the end of his playing career, Bontis played for Schalke FC in the Ontario Soccer League and Proto Stars in the Hamilton Old-Timers League.

== Sports executive ==
On June 7, 2012, Bontis was elected to the board of directors of Canada Soccer. On February 13, 2014, Bontis was appointed co-chair of the Sport Organizing Committee for Men's and Women's Soccer at the 2015 Pan American Games.

On May 6, 2017, Bontis was elected vice president of Canada Soccer and on May 7, 2018, he was re-elected vice president.

On February 28, 2018, Bontis led Canada Soccer's launch of an updated version of the strategic plan based on a nationwide video campaign entitled "You are Canada Soccer".

On November 21, 2020, Bontis was elected president of Canada Soccer.

On February 25, 2023, Bontis is selected as CONCACAF Council vice president representing North America. Two days later, Bontis resigned as president of Canada Soccer after Canada's provincial and territorial soccer federations sent Bontis a letter requesting he step down amid labour disputes between the men's and women's senior national teams.

== Personal life ==
In 2009, Bontis won the Ontario Confederation of University Faculty Associations Teaching Award. Bontis carried the Olympic Torch in Hamilton while it was en route to the 2010 Winter Olympics in Vancouver, and the Pan-American Games torch in lead up to the Hamilton 2015 Pan-American Games.

== Books ==
- Bontis, N. (2020). Information bombardment: Rising above the digital onslaught. Hamilton: Institute for Intellectual Capital Research. 4th edition. ISBN 0-9867945-0-3
- Borins, S., Kernaghan, K., Bontis, N., Brown, D., Thompson, F. and Perri 6. (2007). Digital State at the Leading Edge: Lessons from Canada. Toronto: University of Toronto Press. ISBN 0-8020-9490-2
- Bontis, N. (2004). eBusiness Essentials. Greenwich, CT: Information Age Publishing. ISBN 1-59311-248-3
- Bontis, N. (2002). World Congress of Intellectual Capital Readings. Boston: Elsevier Butterworth Heinemann KMCI Press. ISBN 0-7506-7475-X
- Choo, C. and Bontis, N. (2002). The Strategic Management of Intellectual Capital and Organizational Knowledge. New York: Oxford University Press. ISBN 0-19-515486-X
