= Soccer in Canada =

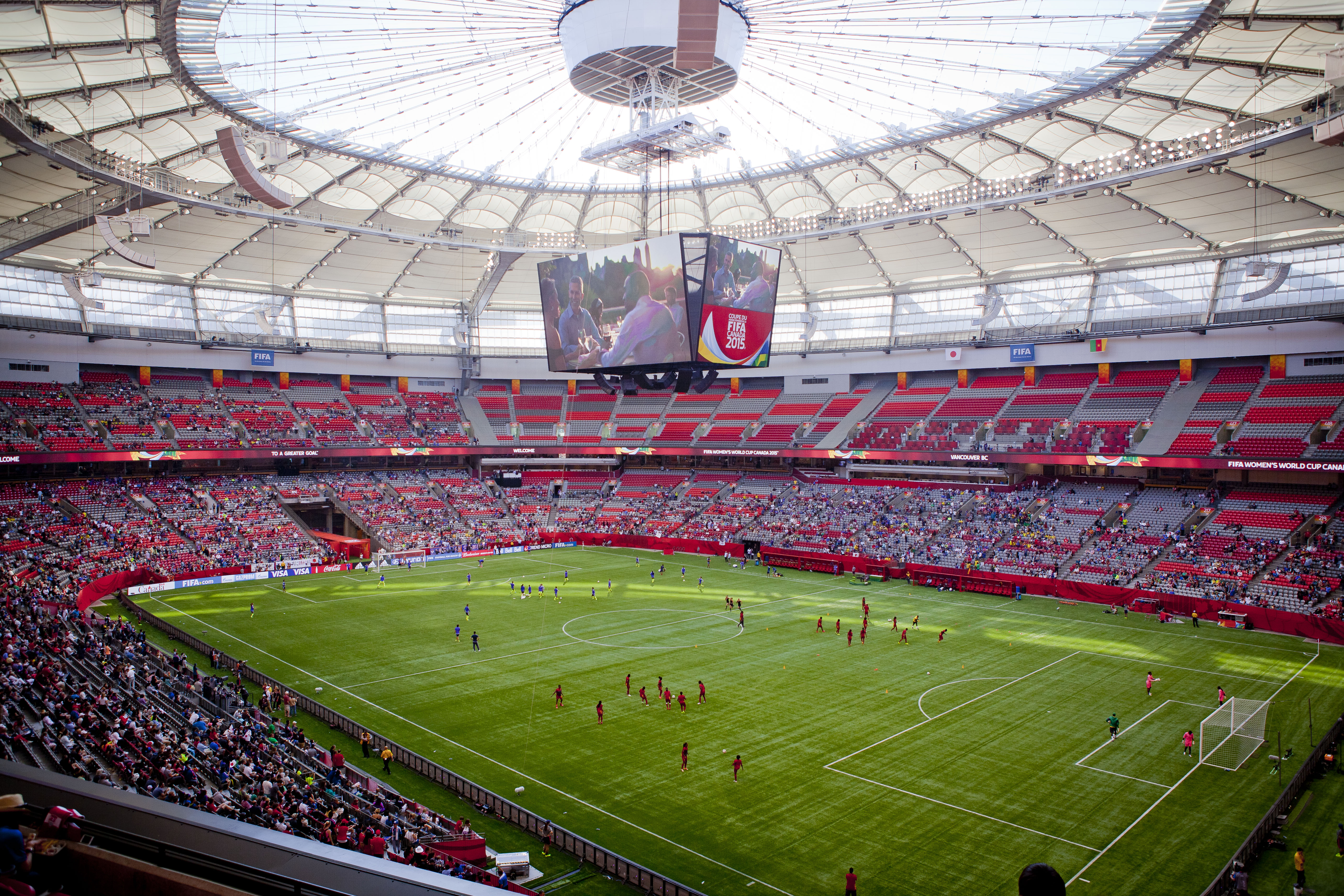
- BC Place, in Vancouver, hosted the final of the 2015 FIFA Women's World Cup.
- Country: Canada
- Governing body: Canadian Soccer Association
- National teams: Men's team Women's team
- First played: 1876
- Registered players: 689,938 (2022)
- Clubs: 1,200 (CSA)

National competitions
- Men's competitions: FIFA World Cup CONCACAF Gold Cup CONCACAF Nations League Copa América (by invite); Women's competitions: FIFA Women's World Cup Summer Olympics CONCACAF W Gold Cup CONCACAF W Championship

Club competitions
- Men's cups: Canadian Championship Challenge Trophy (amateur) Futsal Canadian Championship; Women's cups: W Canadian Championship Inter-Provincial Championship Jubilee Trophy (amateur) Futsal Canadian Championship; Men's leagues: Canadian Premier League Premier Soccer Leagues Canada (APL · BCPL · OPL · PPL · LS Pro) (in the United States) Major League Soccer (3 clubs) MLS Next Pro (2 clubs); Women's leagues: Northern Super League Premier Soccer Leagues Canada (APL · BCPL · OPL · PPL · LS Pro)

International competitions
- Men's competitions: FIFA Club World Cup FIFA Intercontinental Cup CONCACAF Champions Cup Leagues Cup; Women's competitions: FIFA Women's Club World Cup CONCACAF W Champions Cup

Audience records
- Single match: 71,619 (1976) East Germany vs Poland (Olympic Stadium, Montreal)
- Season: 17,971 (2025) Forge FC vs Atlético Ottawa (Hamilton Stadium, Hamilton)

In Canada, soccer is the most popular sport in terms of participation rate; according to Canada Soccer, there are nearly 1 million registered players in Canada, with 50% of youth participating in the sport. Professional soccer in Canada is played in the Canadian Premier League, the Northern Super League and Major League Soccer. Canada also has many semi-professional and amateur soccer leagues. Canada's men's and women's national soccer teams are ranked 25th and 9th respectively in the FIFA World Rankings as of November 2026. Canada has hosted FIFA events including the 2015 FIFA Women's World Cup and the 2026 FIFA World Cup.

== Surveys ==
A 2017 survey by Sportsnet found that soccer is the fourth most popular among Canadians when asked their most-watched sport. Of all respondents, 7% of chose soccer, trailing ice hockey with 40%, Canadian football with 10% and baseball with 8%. According to a Business in Vancouver survey, 15% of Canadians began considering themselves soccer fans after 2022.

== Terminology ==
Soccer is played in Canada according to the rules of the sport. Soccer used to be known as football in Canada, until Canadian football was founded.

The British Columbia Football Association was the first provincial soccer association formed in Canada in 1891. This was followed by the Manitoba Football Association in 1896, the Ontario Football Association in 1901, the Saskatchewan Football Association in 1906, the Alberta Football Association in 1909 and the Province of Quebec Football Association in 1911.

The Dominion of Canada Football Association was formed in 1912. The game's governing body retained that name until it was changed to The Football Association of Canada on June 6, 1952. The Association later changed its name to the Canadian Soccer Football Association in 1958 and then to the Canadian Soccer Association in 1971.

== History ==
=== Early history ===
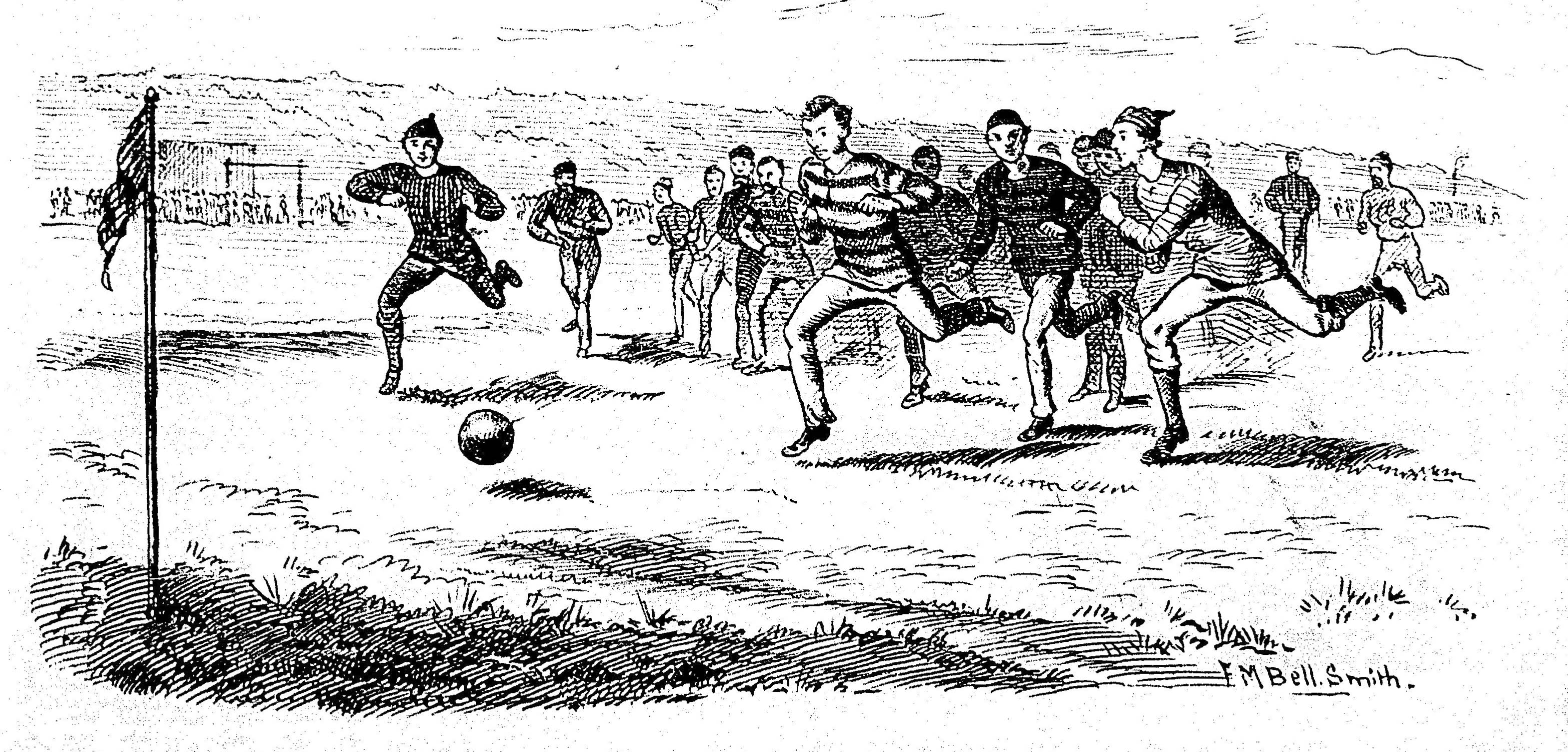
Illustration of a Hamilton vs. Toronto "football" match by Frederic M. Bell-Smith in 1874

One of the earliest soccer games was played in Toronto in 1859 between the St. George's Society and a team of Irishmen. Games were played in New Westminster in 1862 and in Victoria in 1865. The first game played under modern rules took place in Toronto in 1876, after which the Dominion Football Association, the first recorded football association outside the British Isles, was formed in Toronto in 1877 to foster competition between local sides.

In 1880, the Western Football Association was formed in Berlin (now Kitchener), Ontario and played a major role in the subsequent development of the sport throughout southern Ontario. In the time around 1900, the WFA had teams throughout Western Ontario in various municipalities including Seaforth, Mildmay, Listowel, Woodstock, Ingersoll, Brussels, Dundas, Aylmer, Ayr, Tavistock, Preston, Galt and Berlin.

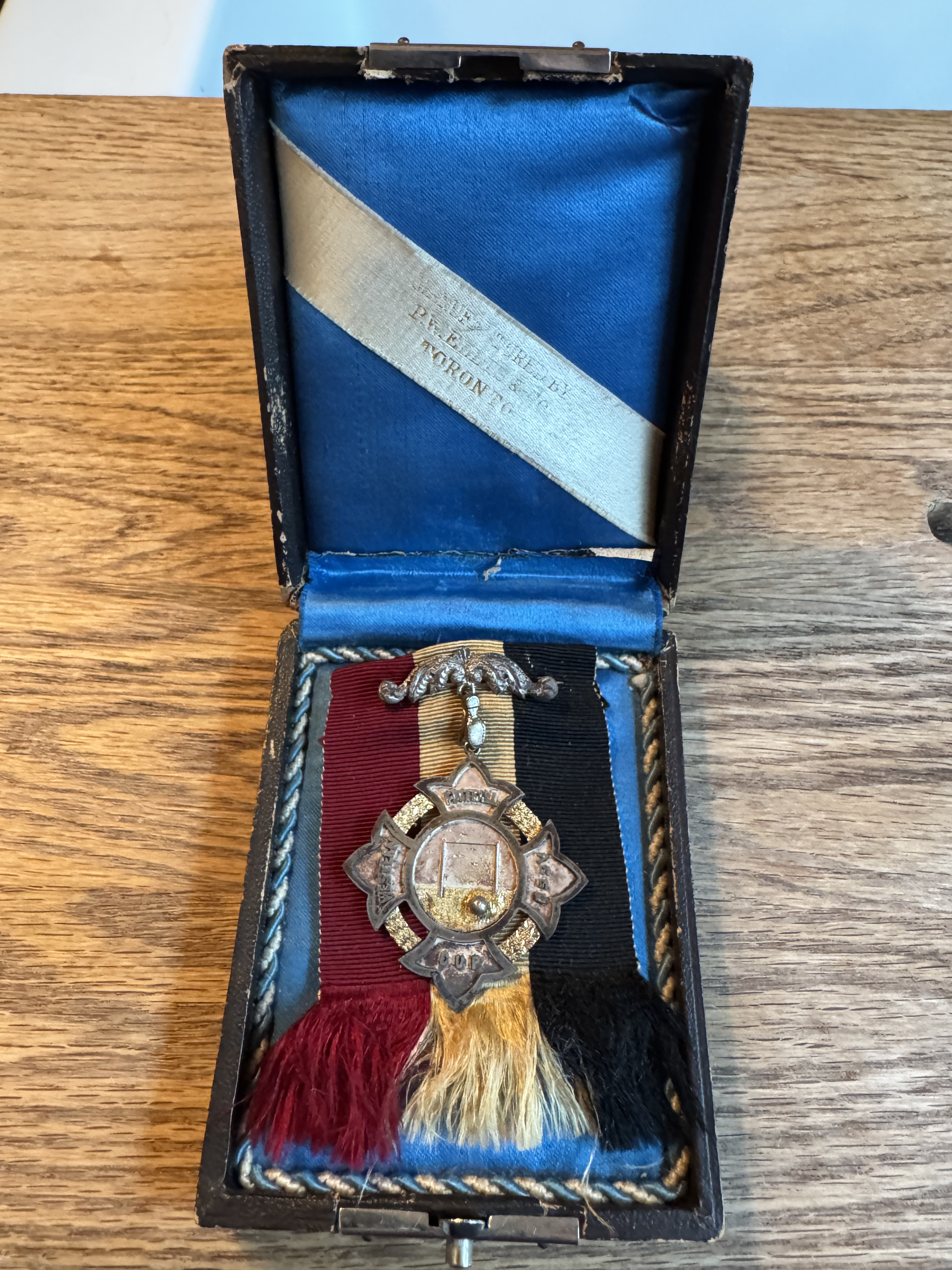
Medal won by Berlin High School FC of Western Football Association – 1881

In 1885 and 1886, the Western Football Association sent teams to New Jersey to play both indoor and outdoor matches against teams representing the American Football Association, then the unofficial governing body of soccer in the United States. In the first unofficial international between the two countries in 1885 Canada defeated the United States 1–0 in East Newark, New Jersey. A year later the American side won 3–2 on the same field. Teams from the two organizations played one another on both sides of the border regularly in the years that followed.

In 1896, the Newfoundland Football League was founded on March 15 in St. John's. The Manitoba Football Association was formed that same year on March 19 in Brandon.

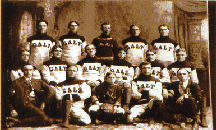
Galt F.C., the first Ontario Cup winner in 1901

In 1901 the Ontario Football Association was formed in Toronto, and competition for the Ontario Cup began. Galt F.C. won the first edition of the tournament that is still running. They represented the WFA at the 1904 Olympic Games in St. Louis, Missouri, winning the gold medal. Only two other teams participated, both American clubs.

In 1905, the Saskatchewan Football Association was formed in the province of Saskatchewan, and by 1911 the Province of Quebec Football Association was formed in Montreal with Frank Calder, first president of the National Hockey League, playing a leading role in the PQFA's formation. The Alberta Football Association was incorporated in the same year.

The first ever professional game was played in Vancouver between the Callies and Rovers in 1910. The "Dominion of Canada Football Association", today known as the "Canadian Soccer Association was founded in Winnipeg, Manitoba in July 1912. "At the meeting, the Manitoba Football Association joined with the provincial associations of Ontario, New Ontario, Quebec, Saskatchewan and Alberta to form the national association." The organization became a member of FIFA December 31, 1912. In 1926, the National Soccer League was formed with teams in Ontario and Quebec. On June 21, 1926, the DCFA resigned from FIFA and remained outside the world governing body, following the example of British associations in a dispute over broken time payments to amateurs. Hamilton's Whitey McDonald was signed by Scottish club Rangers in the 1920s, who spotted him while on tour in North America.

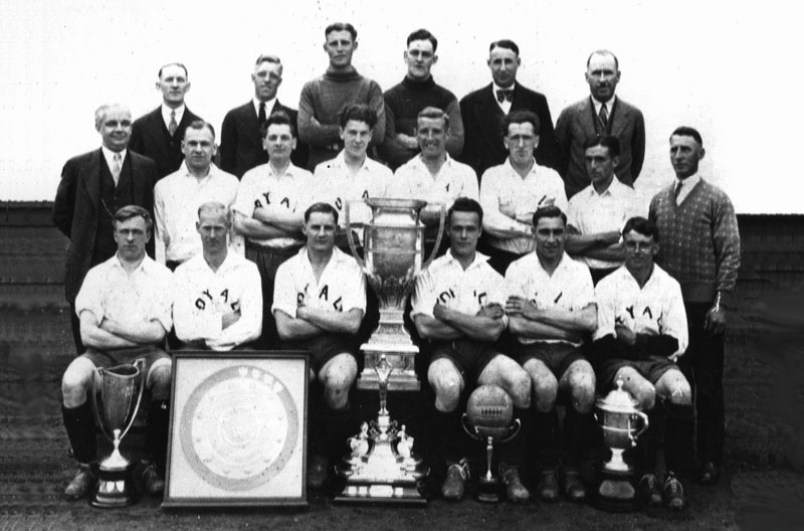
The 1928 Westminster Royals, winners of their first Connaught Cup

The Great Depression of the 1930s meant that the DCFA struggled financially and could not afford to hold annual meetings in 1932 and 1933 and from 1935 to 1940. In those years, business was conducted by mail. At one point, president Len Peto of Montreal loaned the DFA a considerable sum of money to stave off bankruptcy. The money was later repaid in full. Despite the hard times, Montreal-born goalkeeper Joe Kennaway signed for Scottish giants Glasgow Celtic in 1931 and was an immediate success. Toronto Scottish won a North American club championship in 1933 by beating holders and U.S. champions Stix, Baer and Fuller F.C. at Chicago's Soldier Field by a score of 2–1.

=== 1945–1979 ===
In July 1946, the Dominion of Canada Football Association held reorganizational meetings in Winnipeg, Manitoba. On July 24, 1948, the Association again became a member of FIFA. On June 6, 1952, the Association officially changed its name to the Football Association of Canada. In 1958, the Association again changed its name, this time to the Canadian Soccer Football Association. It would change its name one more time in 1971, at that time becoming the Canadian Soccer Association.

In 1957, Canada entered qualifying for the FIFA World Cup for the first time and met the United States and Mexico in qualifying for the finals in Sweden in 1958. Canada won its first World Cup qualifying game 5–1 against the U.S. in Toronto, but played Mexico twice in Mexico City and lost 2–0 and 3–0. In the final group game, Canada beat the U.S. 3–2 in St. Louis, but group winners Mexico advanced to the Finals.

From the 1940s through 1960s, Canada's four major leagues were the Pacific Coast League (re-established in 1939–40), the National League of Ontario/Quebec (re-established in 1947), the Eastern Canada Professional League (established in 1961), and the Western Canada League (established in 1963). Canadian teams also played in the American-based North American Soccer Football League in the late 1940s. The Western Canada League was the first-ever league to feature teams across three and then four provinces, although the league folded in 1971.

During the 1960s there was a concerted effort to push professional soccer in Canada. The Eastern Canada Professional Soccer League was formed in 1961 and featured teams in Toronto, Montreal, Hamilton, and (for one season) Buffalo, New York. One club, Toronto City, even featured some very prominent British soccer stars during its inaugural season, including Northern Ireland international Danny Blanchflower, England internationals Stanley Matthews and Johnny Haynes and Scottish internationals Jackie Mudie and Tommy Younger. This is also notable as the last time that the England, Scotland and Northern Ireland captains all played on the same side together.

Following a rise in the popularity of the game after the global broadcasting of the 1966 World Cup, the North American Soccer League was formed in 1968. The league primarily based in the United States also had clubs in Canada and used many European professionals brought in to supplement domestic talent. Throughout the 1970s and 1980s, Canada was represented by professional teams playing in Montreal, Toronto and Vancouver with short-lived teams in Calgary and Edmonton. The NASL had a stormy relationship with FIFA and the USSF and their clubs did not compete in the CONCACAF Champions' Cup.

The Olympic Summer Games were held in Montreal in 1976, but the soccer tournament featured only 13 teams instead of the normal 16 after the African nations boycotted the games in protest against South Africa's apartheid policies. Canada opened against the Soviet Union in the Olympic Stadium, losing 2–1. Canada lost its second game in Toronto against North Korea and was eliminated from the tournament. The same year, Toronto Metros-Croatia won the Soccer Bowl, the North American Soccer League championship. The final was held in Seattle, where the Toronto side defeated Minnesota 3–0 with a squad featuring Eusébio, striker Ivan Lukačević, Canadian defender Robert Iarusci and goaltender Željko Bilecki. Vancouver Whitecaps won the 1979 Soccer Bowl, beating Tampa Bay Rowdies 2–1 in the final at Giants Stadium in New Jersey.

=== 1980–1999 ===
In 1983, Toronto Blizzard reached the final at B.C. Place Stadium in Vancouver but lost 2–0 to the Tulsa Roughnecks. Also in 1983 the Canadian Professional Soccer League played one shortened season after two years of aborted attempts to find enough clubs to play. Canada also lost the bid to host the 1986 World Cup in 1983 when Mexico was awarded the World Cup. Toronto Blizzard returned to the NASL Finals in 1984, but in losing to the Chicago Sting, came up short for the second consecutive year. The league folded prior to the 1985 season. Despite these misfortunes, Canada qualified for the 1984 Los Angeles Olympics soccer tournament played throughout the United States. In the first round, they drew with Iraq, lost to Yugoslavia and beat Cameroon to qualify for the quarter finals. After taking an early lead against Brazil, Canada were defeated on penalty kicks.

The 1985 CONCACAF Championship was the fourth edition that doubled as qualification for the FIFA World Cup. Continuing in its good phase, Canada secured qualification for the 1986 World Cup after beating Honduras 2–1 in St John's, Newfoundland on September 14, 1985 at King George V Park in front of over 13,000 people. Canada had bid to host the final tournament, but their application was rejected in favour of Mexico, who qualified automatically as hosts, with Canada earning the remaining CONCACAF spot and winning the CONCACAF Championship (now the Gold Cup) for the first time. At the World Cup, Canada were drawn in Group C and lost 1–0 to France and 2–0 to both Hungary and the Soviet Union.

Also in 1986, four Canadian national team players were guilty of taking bribes in a match-fixing scandal at the Merlion Cup in Singapore. The Canadian Soccer Association suspended Chris Cheuden, Hector Marinaro, David Norman and Igor Vrablic for one year each. Marinaro and Norman were reinstated and resumed play for Canada. In the wake of Canada's World Cup appearance, the Canadian Soccer League began operations in 1987 with teams in eight Canadian cities. In 1989 the Canadian Soccer Referees' Association was founded. In 1987, Canada hosted its first FIFA tournament, the 1987 FIFA U-16 World Championship. The country would later also host the 2002 FIFA U-19 Women's World Championship, 2007 FIFA U-20 World Cup, and the 2014 FIFA U-20 Women's World Cup.

The Vancouver 86ers of the CSL won the 1990 North American Club Championship, beating Maryland Bays 3–2 in the final in Burnaby, British Columbia. The same year, Canada's national side took part in the North American Nations Cup, hosting the three-team tournament. Canada won the tournament after a 1–0 win over the United States on May 6 and a 2–1 win over Mexico on May 13, all three goals scored by John Catliff, the tournament's top scorer. In 1991, Canada took part in the championship for the second time as defending champions. Mexico won the 1991 North American Nations Cup with Canada finishing in third place.

After the 1992 season, the CSL was forced to end operations with Vancouver 86ers and Montreal Impact joining the United States' APSL. In January 1993, the Toronto Blizzard also joined the APSL. The Winnipeg Fury, not meeting USSF Division 1 market size standards, and North York Rockets joined the National Soccer League, which changed its name to the Canadian National Soccer League in 1993.

The Canadian women's national team benefited from a surge in youth participation throughout the 1980s, and in 1995 Canada qualified for the FIFA Women's World Cup for the first time. Canada lost to England and Norway and drew with Nigeria at the tournament played in Sweden. Canada again qualified for FIFA Women's World Cup 1999 played in the United States, again going winless after drawing with Japan and losing to Norway and Russia.

=== 2000–2009 ===
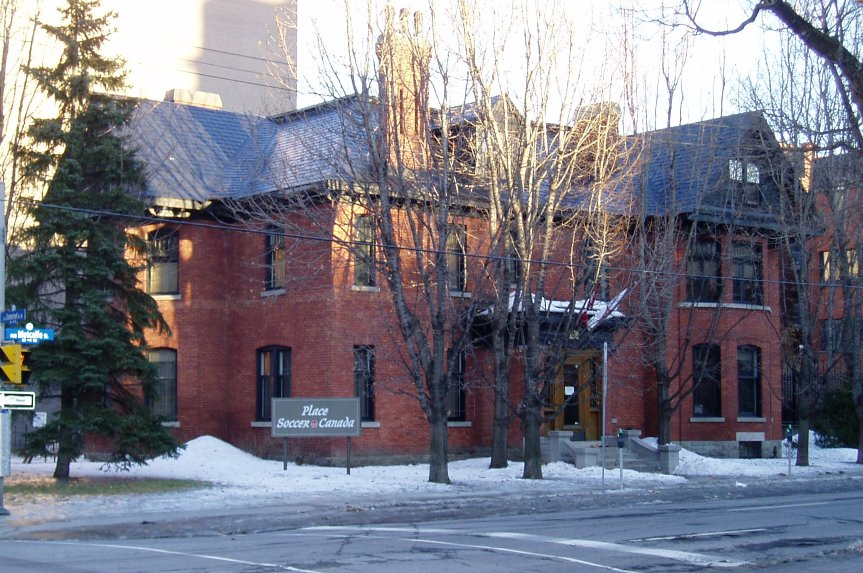
Place Soccer Canada, in Downtown Ottawa, is the headquarters of the Canadian Soccer Association.

In 2000, Canada's men's team won the CONCACAF Gold Cup for the first time. Canada had finished in a tie in group play with South Korea, but won the tie-breaking coin toss to advance to the quarter-final, where they beat Mexico 2–1 on an extra-time golden goal. In the semi-final, Canada beat Trinidad and Tobago 1–0, and beat invited side Colombia 2–0 in the final. As a result of being named CONCACAF champions, Canada travelled to the 2001 Confederations Cup in Japan, earning a memorable 0–0 draw with Brazil thanks to a stellar performance from Gold Cup Most Valuable Player, goalkeeper Craig Forrest.

At the next Gold Cup in 2002, Canada reached the semi-final for the second time but lost to the United States, on penalty kicks, who would go on to win the tournament. Despite their success in the Gold Cup, Canada's senior men's side failed to qualify for either the 2002 or 2006 World Cup.

Also in 2002, Canada hosted the first ever FIFA U-19 Women's World Championship with games in Edmonton, Victoria, and Vancouver. The final between Canada and the United States was played at Edmonton's Commonwealth Stadium, with the U.S. winning on a golden goal. Canadian Christine Sinclair received the tournament's Golden Ball as MVP and Golden Boot as leading goal-scorer. Rounding out 2002, Canada's senior women's team, with several players from the U-19 squad, met the United States in the 2002 CONCACAF Women's Gold Cup final, where the U.S. won on yet another golden goal. Still later that year, Sinclair led the U.S. NCAA Division I in goals scored as she helped the University of Portland win the national championship.

The senior women's side again qualified for the 2003 FIFA Women's World Cup. In the group stages they lost to Germany before beating Japan and Argentina for their first wins in World Cup history (men or women). In the quarter-finals, Canada upset China 1–0 before losing to Sweden in the semifinal. They were again beat by old rivals the U.S. in the 3rd place game. The under-19 women's side qualified for the 2004 world championship in Thailand, losing in the quarterfinals to China. For the second straight tournament, a Canadian won the Golden Boot, with Brittany Timko the top-scorer. Sinclair set an NCAA Division I record in 2005 with 39 goals as she led Portland to another NCAA title and earned a second straight Hermann Trophy. In the wake of her record-setting season at Portland, Sinclair won the Honda-Broderick Cup in 2006 as the outstanding female athlete at a U.S. university. Also in 2006, long-serving CSA Chief Operating Officer Kevan Pipe was fired from his duties. The CPSL re-branded as the Canadian Soccer League.

In 2007, Toronto FC began play in Major League Soccer as its first franchise located outside the United States. It would become the first Canadian team to win the MLS Cup in 2017, after defeating Seattle Sounders FC. Canada's national team reached the semi-final at the 2007 CONCACAF Gold Cup, losing again to the U.S. who would again win the tournament as in 2002. Dale Mitchell was named coach of Canada's senior men's team, to begin duties after the 2007 FIFA U-20 World Cup, held in Canada. The host went out without scoring a goal and losing all three matches. The final was held in front of 20,000 people at BMO Field in Toronto, with Argentina beating the Czech Republic 2–1.

In May 2008, the CSA inaugurated the Canadian Championship – a domestic cup competition open to professional clubs in Canada. The Montreal Impact won the inaugural season and qualified for the 2008–09 CONCACAF Champions League season. In women's soccer, Canada qualified for the Women's Olympic Football Tournament for the first time. The team came within an extra-time goal of knocking off number-one ranked U.S. in the quarter-final. At the youth level, Canada won its second CONCACAF Women's U-20 Championship.

=== 2010–present ===
In March 2011, it was announced Canada would host the 2015 FIFA Women's World Cup for the first time, where they reached the quarterfinals. Matches were held BC Place in Vancouver, Commonwealth Stadium in Edmonton, Olympic Stadium in Montreal, Investors Group Field in Winnipeg, TD Place Stadium in Ottawa, and Moncton Stadium in Moncton.

On January 31, 2013, the Canadian Soccer Association announced they were withdrawing sanctioning of the Canadian Soccer League (CSL) as a division 3 league following the 2013 season as the CSA board of directors adopted a new soccer structure in Canada based on the Easton Report. Prior to being de-sanctioned, the CSL had been involved in a match-fixing scandal and a majority of the teams reportedly did not meet CSA requirements in the 2012 season. The league was founded in 1998 after a merger between the Canadian National Soccer League with the stillborn Ontario Professional Soccer League and previously featured academy clubs of Toronto FC and Montreal Impact. The CSL continued to play following the creation of their own soccer federation in 2014 which was unsanctioned by FIFA.

On June 10, 2013, the Canadian Soccer Association suspended the Quebec Soccer Federation over its refusal to let turban-wearing children play. Quebec's premier Pauline Marois announced her support of the Quebec Soccer Federation's ban and suggested that the CSA has no authority over provincial organizations.

In 2014, the QSF removed the ban after a ruling from FIFA that turbans are allowed for male players.

On May 6, 2017, the creation the Canadian Premier League was unanimously approved and sanctioned by the Canadian Soccer Association as a division 1 league. On December 9, 2017, Toronto FC became the first MLS team to complete a domestic treble with their 2–0 win over the Seattle Sounders FC in the MLS Cup, as well as the first Canadian team to win the MLS Cup. On June 13, 2018, Canada, Mexico and United States joint bid was chosen to co-host the 2026 FIFA World Cup 69 votes ahead of Morocco 134–65 at the FIFA Congress in Moscow. The first match of the inaugural season of the Canadian Premier League took place between Forge FC and York9 FC at Tim Hortons Field on April 27, 2019, and resulted in a 1–1 draw.

On August 6, 2021, the women's side won their first Olympic gold medal, at the 2020 Summer Olympics.

On March 27, 2022, the men's side defeated Jamaica 4–0 on Matchday 13 to qualify for the 2022 FIFA World Cup. This ended a 36-year drought since the first time Canada played in the FIFA World Cup, in 1986. In the tournament, as part of Group F, Canada suffered three defeats again, being 1–0 for Belgium, 4–1 for Croatia (in which he scored his first goal in the tournament's history, with Alphonso Davies) and 2–1 for Morocco.

A national domestic women's soccer league, the Northern Super League, was launched in 2025.

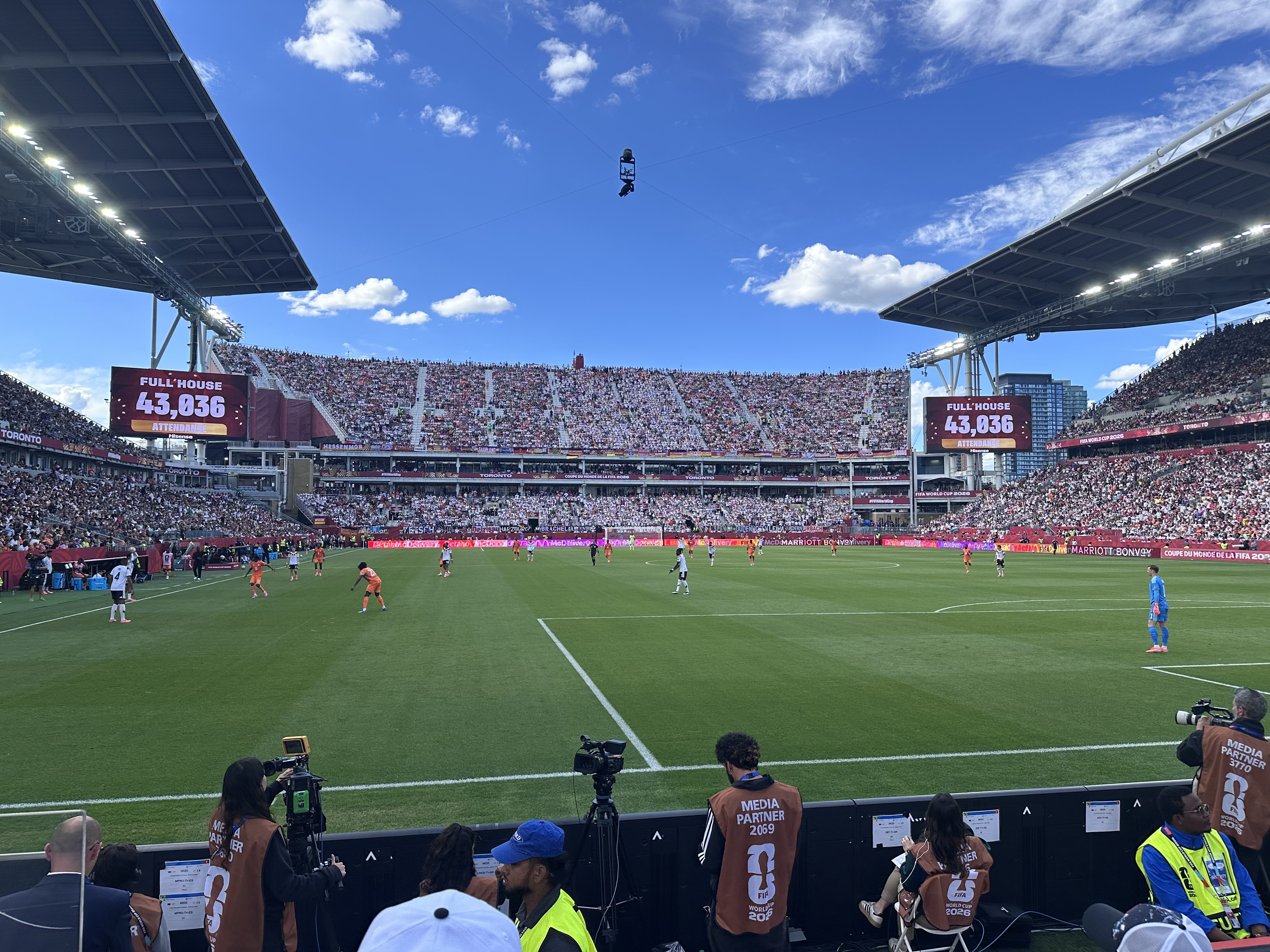
BMO Field during the 2026 FIFA World Cup.

Canada co-hosted the 2026 FIFA World Cup, along with the United States and Mexico. 13 matches were held at BMO Field in Toronto and BC Place in Vancouver. In the tournament, Canada earned its first group-stage point, a World Cup match win, and a knockout-round win. The team faced Morocco in the round of 16 and were defeated 3–0.

== Popularity ==
As in other English-speaking nations outside the United Kingdom, association football (soccer) has been traditionally overshadowed by a rival code of the game with explicitly local roots. As in Australia, where Australian rules football took hold; and Ireland, where Gaelic football is played; while in New Zealand, rugby holds greater popularity; Canadian football usurped association football. In 1869, the founding of Hamilton Football Club, who played what would become Canadian football, helped make that sport the dominant football code in Canada by the dawn of the twentieth century.

Despite the difference in popularity of their respective professional leagues, soccer overtook ice hockey in the 1980s and 1990s as the sport with the most registered players in the country. In 2008, there were 873,032 soccer players, compared to 584,679 registered hockey players in Canada in 2008–09.

== Leagues ==
The following is a list of fully professional teams in Canada:

Fully professional teams (2026)
Team	League	Division	Location	Stadium	Joined
Atlético Ottawa	CPL	1	Ottawa	TD Place Stadium	2020
Cavalry FC	CPL	1	Foothills County (Greater Calgary)	ATCO Field	2019
Forge FC	CPL	1	Hamilton	Tim Hortons Field	2019
HFX Wanderers FC	CPL	1	Halifax	Wanderers Grounds	2019
Inter Toronto FC	CPL	1	Toronto	York Lions Stadium	2019
FC Supra du Québec	CPL	1	Laval (Greater Montreal)	Stade Boréale	2026
Pacific FC	CPL	1	Langford (Greater Victoria)	Starlight Stadium	2019
Vancouver FC	CPL	1	Langley (Greater Vancouver)	Willoughby Community Park	2023
CF Montréal	MLS	1 (US)	Montreal	Saputo Stadium	2012
Toronto FC	MLS	1 (US)	Toronto	BMO Field	2007
Vancouver Whitecaps FC	MLS	1 (US)	Vancouver	BC Place	2011
Toronto FC II	MLSNP	3 (US)	Toronto	BMO Training Ground	2022
Whitecaps FC 2	MLSNP	3 (US)	Vancouver	Swangard Stadium	2022
Calgary Wild FC	NSL	1	Calgary	McMahon Stadium	2025
Halifax Tides FC	NSL	1	Halifax	Wanderers Grounds	2025
Montreal Roses FC	NSL	1	Laval (Greater Montreal)	Centre Sportif Bois-de-Boulogne	2025
Ottawa Rapid FC	NSL	1	Ottawa	TD Place Stadium	2025
AFC Toronto	NSL	1	Toronto	York Lions Stadium	2025
Vancouver Rise FC	NSL	1	Burnaby (Greater Vancouver)	Swangard Stadium	2025

=== Canadian Premier League ===
The Canadian Premier League (CPL) is the highest level of professional soccer in Canada. The tier 1 soccer league began play in 2019 and includes eight Canadian teams, including Atlético Ottawa (Ottawa, Ontario), Cavalry FC (Foothills County, Alberta), Forge FC (Hamilton, Ontario), HFX Wanderers (Halifax, Nova Scotia), Inter Toronto FC (Toronto, Ontario) Pacific FC (Langford, British Columbia), FC Supra du Québec (Laval, Quebec), and Vancouver FC (Langley, British Columbia). The CPL has announced conditional expansion clubs to Saskatoon and Windsor. The stated goal of the league is to develop Canadian soccer talent, and as such will have a minimum number of Canadian players on each roster and an annual draft of U Sports players.

=== Major League Soccer ===
Major League Soccer (MLS) is the highest level of professional soccer in the United States. There are three MLS teams located in Canada. Toronto FC became the first Canadian club in 2007. An MLS franchise was awarded to Vancouver in 2009 and began play in the 2011 season. An MLS franchise was awarded to Montreal in 2010 and began play in the 2012 season. Both the Vancouver and Montreal clubs were long-time organizations that had played in USSF-sanctioned Division 2 leagues — North American Soccer League and the USL Championship.

==== Attendances ====
The MLS clubs from Canada with their average home attendance in 2025:

#	Club	Average
1	Vancouver Whitecaps	21,806
2	Toronto FC	21,353
3	CF Montréal	16,162

=== MLS Next Pro ===
In 2022, Toronto FC II and Whitecaps FC 2 began play in MLS Next Pro, a United States Soccer Federation-sanctioned division 3 league and the reserve league of MLS. Toronto FC II had played in the division 2 USL Championship until 2018 and in the division 3 USL League One from 2019 to 2021.

=== Premier Soccer Leagues Canada ===
Semi-professional leagues have been operated by provincial soccer associations since 2012 and have been designated as pro-am by the Canadian Soccer Association. Currently five such leagues exist: Ligue1 Québec, Ontario Premier League, British Columbia Premier League, Alberta Premier League, and Prairies Premier League — all operating men's and women's competitions. The champions of the four men's leagues are given berths into the Canadian Championship. Starting in 2022, the champions of the three women's leagues, along with a second team from the host league, compete at a single location in an interprovincial championship. In 2022, League1 Canada was launched as an alliance for Ligue1 Québec, League1 Ontario and League1 British Columbia to unify and elevate the sport of soccer at the pro-am level through sharing of resources, best practices, and coordination of national commercial partnerships. In 2026, all leagues were rebranded under Premier Soccer Leagues Canada.

=== USL League Two ===
USL League Two is a U.S.-based, men's amateur league. For the 2024 season, Thunder Bay Chill, based in Thunder Bay, Ontario, was the only Canadian team in the league. Since 2025, no Canadian teams play in USL League Two. Four Canadian teams have won the league championship:

- 2008 – Thunder Bay Chill, who moved to the Prairies Premier League in 2026
- 2012 – Forest City London, who moved to League1 Ontario in 2016
- 2015 – K–W United FC, now defunct
- 2018 – Calgary Foothills FC, who moved to League1 Alberta in 2023

=== Northern Super League ===
The Northern Super League is a fully Canadian women's pro league. Halifax Tides FC, Montreal Roses FC, AFC Toronto, Calgary Wild FC, Ottawa Rapid FC, and Vancouver Rise FC are the teams in the league.

=== United Women's Soccer ===
United Women's Soccer is a U.S.-based, women's pro-am league. Calgary Foothills WFC is the only Canadian team in the league.

=== Canadian soccer cup competitions ===
- Canadian Championship (fully pro teams from Canadian Premier League and Major League Soccer and league champions from League1 Ontario, League1 British Columbia, and Ligue1 Québec.)
- Challenge Trophy (amateur men's nationals)
- Jubilee Trophy (amateur women's nationals)

Many of the provincially sanctioned amateur leagues have league cup competitions. Some such as the ones in British Columbia have significant history.

- Vancouver Island Soccer League – Sir John Jackson Cup first contested 1914
- Fraser Valley Soccer League – Packenham Cup first contested 1909
- Vancouver Metro Soccer League – Imperial Cup first contested 1913
- British Columbia Provincial Soccer Championship – Province Cup (formerly McBride Shield and BCFA Challenge Cup) first contested 1892
- Pacific Coast Soccer League – Cambridge Cup
- Pacific Coast Soccer League – John F. Kennedy Cup (between top amateur teams in BC, Washington State, and Oregon)

== National teams ==
The men's national soccer team have appeared in four senior FIFA tournaments: the 1986 FIFA World Cup in Mexico, the 2001 FIFA Confederations Cup in Japan, the 2022 FIFA World Cup in Qatar, and the 2026 FIFA World Cup in Canada, Mexico, and the United States. The women's senior national team have appeared in ten senior FIFA tournaments: seven FIFA Women's World Cups and three Women's Olympic Soccer Tournaments.

A Québec official soccer team has represented Quebec and French Canadians in non-FIFA tournaments.

== Stadiums ==
Many Canadian football stadiums and multi-use stadiums are utilized for soccer.

With the growth of Major League Soccer, the Canadian Premier League and the three Tier 3 provincially-based soccer leagues, Canada has a number of soccer-specific stadiums.

=== Largest Canadian stadiums used for soccer ===
Rank	Stadium	City	Capacity	Opened	Surface	Professional teams
1	Commonwealth Stadium	Edmonton, Alberta	56,302	1978	Turf	Edmonton Elks (CFL)
2	Olympic Stadium	Montreal, Quebec	56,040	1976	Turf	None (Note: Occasionally hosts CF Montréal games.)
3	BC Place	Vancouver, British Columbia	54,500	1983	Turf	BC Lions (CFL); Vancouver Whitecaps FC (MLS)
4	Princess Auto Stadium	Winnipeg, Manitoba	32,343	2013	Turf	Winnipeg Blue Bombers (CFL)

== See also ==
- Canadian soccer pyramid
- Canada men's national soccer team
- Canada women's national soccer team
- Canadian Premier League
- Canadian Soccer Hall of Fame and Museum
- List of soccer clubs in Canada
- List of soccer stadiums in Canada
- Canada men's national beach soccer team
- Canada men's national futsal team
