= Steve Reed (soccer executive) =

Canadian soccer executive

34th President of the Canadian Soccer Association
- In office May 7, 2017 – 2020
- Preceded by: Victor Montagliani
- Succeeded by: Nick Bontis

Personal details
- Education: Simon Fraser University

Steve Reed is a Canadian soccer executive, and a former president of the Canadian Soccer Association.

Reed is a Partner Vancouver-based Manning Elliott LLP.

Reed graduated from Simon Fraser University in 1980 and received his Chartered accountant designation in 1981. He left Deloitte & Touche where he held a position as Tax Manager to join Manning Elliot in 1989.

Reed had been a board member of the CSA since 2006 and a vice-president since 2012 until his election as president in 2016.
