= Ginásio Paulo Sarasate =

Arena in Brazil

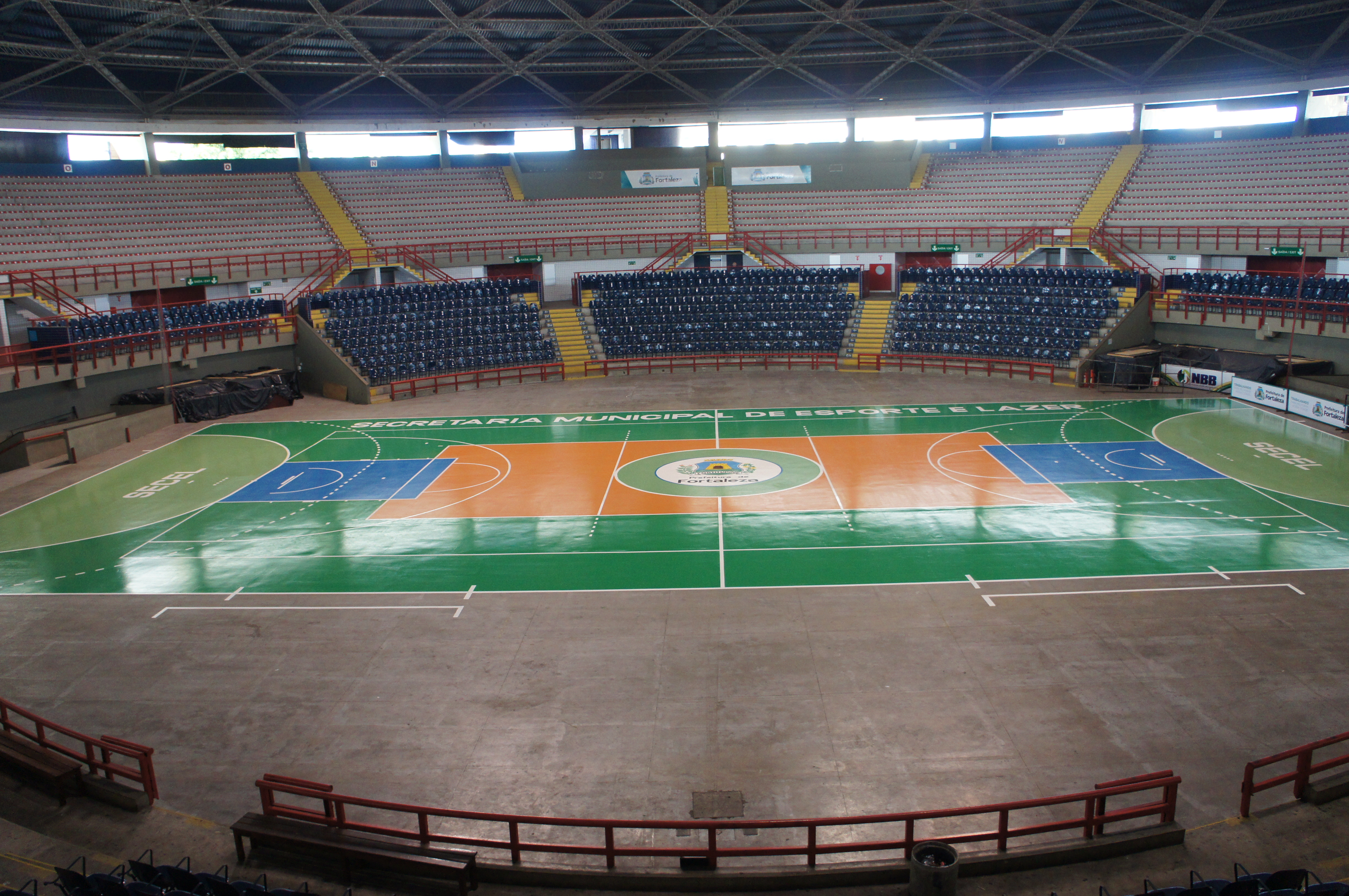
- Ginásio Paulo Sarasate
- Interactive map of Ginásio Paulo Sarasate
- Full name: Ginásio Paulo Sarasate
- Location: Fortaleza, Brazil
- Coordinates: 3°44′15″S 38°30′55″W
- Capacity: 10,000

Construction
- Opened: September 24, 1971

Tenant
- 2008 Grand Prix de Futsal

Ginásio Paulo Sarasate is an indoor sporting arena located in Fortaleza, Brazil. The capacity of the arena is 10,000 spectators and opened in 1971. It hosts indoor sporting events such as basketball and volleyball, and also hosts concerts.
