= Josh Lemos =

Canadian soccer and futsal player

Personal information
- Full name: Joshua Lemos
- Date of birth: May 4, 1989 (age 37)
- Place of birth: Brampton, Ontario, Canada
- Height: 1.83 m (6 ft 0 in)
- Position: Goalkeeper

Team information
- Current team: Milwaukee Wave
- Number: 30

Youth career
- 2004–2005: Liverpool F.C. (Montevideo)
- 2006–2007: Deportivo AELU
- 2006: Cruz Azul Shooters
- 2007: Cienciano

Senior career*
Years	Team	Apps	(Gls)
2006–2007	Italia Shooters		
2008	North York Astros		
2009–2011	Diriangén FC		
2016–	Milwaukee Wave (indoor)	51	(3)

International career^{‡}
2012–2021	Canada Futsal	15	(1)
- * Club domestic league appearances and goals as of 22 December 2022 ‡ National team caps and goals as of 4 May 2021

Joshua Lemos (born May 4, 1989) is a Canadian futsal player who plays as a goalkeeper for the Canada national team. He also plays professional indoor soccer for the Milwaukee Wave.

== Early life ==
Lemos was born in Brampton, Ontario, a suburb of Toronto, to a Uruguayan father and a Canadian mother.

== Club career ==
=== Early career ===
In 2004, Lemos played abroad in the Uruguayan youth circuit for Liverpool F.C.. He also played with the under-16 sides of Deportivo AELU in Peru and for Cienciano.

In 2006, he returned to Canada and played in the Ontario Soccer League's provincial east under-21 division with Cruz Azul Shooters. Once the season concluded, he was named the division's top goalkeeper. His time with Cruz Azul granted him the opportunity to be called up to their parent club, the Italia Shooters, in the Southern Ontario-based Canadian Soccer League. He re-signed with Italia for the 2007 season.

His third season in the CSL circuit was in 2008, when he played for the North York Astros. Following his stint with North York, he played abroad in the Nicaraguan top league with Diriangén FC.

=== Indoor ===
Lemos transitioned into the indoor level during the winter of 2016 by playing in the American-based Major Arena Soccer League with the Milwaukee Wave. In his debut season with Milwaukee, he received an honorable mention for the league's all-rookie team. In total, he played in 15 matches for the club.

He re-signed with Milwaukee the following season. In his second season with the club, he helped clinch the Central Division title, which also secured a playoff berth. The Wave was eliminated in the conference final by the Baltimore Blast. For his efforts, the league named Lemos to the All-League second team.

The 2018–19 season marked his third year for the club. Lemos assisted the club in securing another postseason berth and played in the Eastern Conference semi-final match, where Milwaukee defeated Baltimore Blast to advance to the Ron Newman Cup final. He would participate in the championship finals, where Milwaukee defeated Monterrey Flash for their eighth championship title. He was named to the league's All-League second team for the second consecutive season.

After lifting the COVID-19 pandemic restrictions, Milwaukee fielded a team for the 2021–22 season with Lemos returning to play with the club. However, he failed to make an appearance throughout the season due to complications with his work permit.

== International career ==
Lemos played with the Canada national futsal team in the 2012 CONCACAF Futsal Championship qualifier match against El Salvador, where Canada qualified for the tournament, with Lemos also contributing a goal. He was also selected to represent the national team in the tournament, where he played against the United States and Panama.

He returned to the international scene to represent Canada in the 2016 CONCACAF Futsal Championship. Lemos would play in all three matches in the group stage against Cuba, Costa Rica, and Curaçao. He was selected once again to represent the national team for the 2021 CONCACAF Futsal Championship.

In 2021, the Canadian Soccer Association named Lemos the Canadian Soccer Futsal Player of the Year.

== Honors ==
Milwaukee Wave

- Major Arena Soccer League Ron Newman Cup: 2018–19
- Major Arena Soccer League Central Division: 2017–18
- Major Arena Soccer League South Central Division: 2018–19

Individual

- Canadian Soccer Association Canadian Soccer Futsal Player of the Year: 2021
- Ontario Soccer League Provincial East U-21 Goalkeeper of the Year: 2006
