= 2008 Grand Prix de Futsal =

Tournament details
- Host country: Brazil
- Dates: 31 May – 8 June
- Teams: 16 (from 4 confederations)
- Venue(s): 2 (in 1 host city)

Final positions
- Champions: Brazil (4th title)
- Runners-up: Argentina
- Third place: Ukraine
- Fourth place: Paraguay

Tournament statistics
- Matches played: 72
- Goals scored: 249 (3.46 per match)

The 2008 Grand Prix de Futsal was the fourth edition of the international futsal competition of the same kind as the FIFA Futsal World Cup but with invited nations and held annually in Brazil.It was first held in 2005.

== Venues ==
- Fortaleza (Ceará, Brazil)
- Halls: Ginásio Paulo Sarasate (Fortaleza), Ginásio da Universidade de Fortaleza (Unifor)

== Fixtures ==
31 May 2008 Ginásio Paulo Sarasate

- 09.00 Serbia – Argentina 2–3 (0–2)
- 11.00 Brazil – Angola 12–0 (2–0)
- 13.00 Czech Republic – Paraguay 2–2 (2–1)
- 15.00 Chile – Croatia 0–3 (0–1)

Ginásio da Universidade de Fortaleza (Unifor)

- 13.00 Egypt – Venezuela 1–0 (0–0)
- 15.00 Canada – Ukraine 0–5 (0–1)
- 17.00 Colombia – Mozambique 5–1 (2–0)
- 19.00 Peru – Uruguay 1–6 (0–3)

01/06/2008 Ginásio Paulo Sarasate

- 12.30 Croatia – Brazil 0–7(0–5)
- 14.30 Uruguay – Czech Republic 0–3 (0–3)
- 16.30 Angola – Chile 3–2 (1–0)
- 18.30 Paraguay – Peru 4–1 (1–1)

Ginásio da Universidade de Fortaleza (Unifor)

- 10.00 Argentina – Egypt 5–0 (2–0)
- 12.00 Mozambique – Canada 6–2 (3–2)
- 14.00 Venezuela – Serbia 1–4 (0–2)
- 16.00 Ukraine – Colombia 3–3 (1–1)

02/06/2008 Ginásio Paulo Sarasate

- 15.00 Croatia – Angola 2–1 (0–0)
- 17.00 Uruguay – Paraguay 2–5 (0–1)
- 19.00 Brazil – Chile 11–0 (3–0)
- 21.00 Czech Republic – Peru 4–2 (2–2)

Ginásio da Universidade de Fortaleza (Unifor)

- 15.00 Egypt – Serbia 1–6 (1–3)
- 17.00 Canada – Colombia 1–2 (1–0)
- 19.00 Argentina – Venezuela 2–1 (1–1)
- 21.00 Mozambique – Ukraine 1–8 (1–5)

== First stage ==
=== Group A ===
Team	Pld	W	D	L	GF	GA	Diff	Pts
Brazil	3	3	0	0	30	0	0	9
Croatia	3	2	0	1	5	8	−3	6
Angola	3	1	0	2	4	16	−12	3
Chile	3	0	0	3	2	17	−15	0

31 May 2008
11:00 BRT

Brazil	12–0	Angola

Ginásio Paulo Sarasate, Fortaleza

31 May 2008
15:00 BRT

Chile	0–3	Croatia

Ginásio Paulo Sarasate, Fortaleza

1 June 2008
12:30 BRT

Croatia	0–7	Brazil

Ginásio Paulo Sarasate, Fortaleza

1 June 2008
16:30 BRT

Angola	3–2	Chile

Ginásio Paulo Sarasate, Fortaleza

2 June 2008
15:00 BRT

Croatia	2–1	Angola

Ginásio Paulo Sarasate, Fortaleza

2 June 2008
19:00 BRT (UTC-03)

Brazil	11–0	Chile

Ginásio Paulo Sarasate, Fortaleza

=== Group B ===
Team	Pld	W	D	L	GF	GA	Diff	Pts
Paraguay	3	2	1	0	11	5	7	7
Czech Republic	3	2	1	0	9	4	5	7
Uruguay	3	1	0	2	8	9	−1	3
Peru	3	0	0	3	4	14	−10	0

31 May 2008
13:00 BRT

Czech Republic	2–2	Paraguay

Ginásio Paulo Sarasate, Fortaleza

31 May 2008
15:00 BRT

Peru	1–6	Uruguay

Ginásio da Universidade de Fortaleza, Unifor

1 June 2008
14:30 BRT

Uruguay	0–3	Czech Republic

Ginásio Paulo Sarasate, Fortaleza

1 June 2008
18:30 BRT

Paraguay	4–1	Peru

Ginásio Paulo Sarasate, Fortaleza

2 June 2008
17:00 BRT

Uruguay	2–5	Paraguay

Ginásio Paulo Sarasate, Fortaleza

2 June 2008
21:00 BRT (UTC-03)

Czech Republic	4–2	Peru

Ginásio Paulo Sarasate, Fortaleza

=== Group C ===
Team	Pld	W	D	L	GF	GA	Diff	Pts
Argentina	3	3	0	0	10	3	7	9
Serbia	3	2	0	1	12	5	7	6
Egypt	3	1	0	2	2	11	−9	3
Venezuela	3	0	0	3	2	7	−5	0

31 May 2008
09:00 BRT

Serbia	2–3	Argentina

Ginásio Paulo Sarasate, Fortaleza

31 May 2008
13:00 BRA

Egypt	1–0	Venezuela

Ginásio da Universidade de Fortaleza, Unifor

1 June 2008
10:00 BRT

Argentina	5–0	Egypt

Ginásio da Universidade de Fortaleza, Unifor

1 June 2008
14:00 BRT

Venezuela	1–4	Serbia

Ginásio Paulo Sarasate, Fortaleza

2 June 2008
15:00 BRT

Egypt	1–6	Serbia

Ginásio da Universidade de Fortaleza, Unifor

2 June 2008
19:00 BRT (UTC-03)

Argentina	2–1	Venezuela

Ginásio da Universidade de Fortaleza, Unifor

=== Group D ===
Team	Pld	W	D	L	GF	GA	Diff	Pts
Ukraine	3	2	1	0	16	4	12	7
Colombia	3	2	1	0	10	5	5	7
Mozambique	3	1	0	2	8	15	−7	3
Canada	3	0	0	3	3	13	−10	0

31 May 2008
15:00 BRT

Canada	0–5	Ukraine

Ginásio da Universidade de Fortaleza, Unifor

31 May 2008
17:00 BRA

Colombia	5–1	Mozambique

Ginásio da Universidade de Fortaleza, Unifor

1 June 2008
12:00 BRT

Mozambique	6–2	Canada

Ginásio da Universidade de Fortaleza, Unifor

1 June 2008
16:00 BRT

Ukraine	3–3	Colombia

Ginásio da Universidade de Fortaleza, Unifor

2 June 2008
17:00 BRT

Canada	1–2	Colombia

Ginásio da Universidade de Fortaleza, Unifor

2 June 2008
21:00 BRT (UTC-03)

Mozambique	1–8	Ukraine

Ginásio da Universidade de Fortaleza, Unifor

== Second stage ==
=== Plate competition ===
Ginásio da Universidade de Fortaleza (Unifor)

Quarter finals
4 June
Uruguay	3
Canada	2
4 June
Egypt	4
Chile	0
4 June
Angola	1
Venezuela	3
4 June
Mozambique	3
Peru	2

Semifinals (9th–12th)
5 June
Uruguay	2
Egypt (aet)	3
5 June
Venezuela	1
Mozambique	0

Final
5 June
Egypt	2
Venezuela	3
11th place
5 June
Mozambique	3(2)
Uruguay	3(4)

Semifinals (13th–16th)
5 June
Angola	3
Peru	1
5 June
Canada	2
Chile (aet)	3

13th place
7 June
Angola (aet)	5
Chile	4
15th place
7 June
Peru	4
Canada	1

== Finals ==
=== 15th/16th Place Match ===
7 June 2008
15:00 BRT

Peru	4–1	Canada

=== 13th/14th Place Match ===
7 June 2008
17:00 BRT

Angola	5–4 (a.e.t.)	Chile

=== 11th/12th Place Match ===
7 June 2008
19:00 BRT

Mozambique	3–3 (a.e.t.)	Uruguay
Penalties
	2–4

=== 9th/10th Place Match ===
7 June 2008
21:00 BRT

Egypt	2–3	Venezuela

=== Cup competition ===
Ginásio Paulo Sarasate (Fortaleza)

Quarter finals
4 June
Paraguay	2
Colombia	0
4 June
Argentina	1
Croatia	0
4 June
Brazil	4
Serbia	2
4 June
Ukraine (aet)	3
Czech Republic	0

Semifinals
5 June
Paraguay	2 (2)
Argentina	2 (4)
5 June
Brazil	5
Ukraine	1

Final
8 June
Argentina	2
Brazil	3
3rd place
7 June
Ukraine (aet)	5
Paraguay	4

Semifinals (5th–8th)
5 June
Serbia	3
Czech Republic	2
5 June
Colombia	5
Croatia	2

5th place
7 June
Serbia	4
Colombia	2
7th place
7 June
Czech Republic	0
Croatia	1

== Finals ==
=== 7th/8th Place Match ===
7 June 2008
15:00 BRT

Czech Republic	0–1	Croatia

=== 5th/6th Place Match ===
7 June 2008
17:00 BRT

Serbia	4–2	Colombia

=== 3rd/4th Place Match ===
7 June 2008
19:00 BRT

Ukraine	5–4 (a.e.t.)	Paraguay

=== 1st/2nd Place Match ===
8 June 2008
10:00 BRT

Brazil	3–2	Argentina

== Winner ==
Grand Prix de Futsal
2008 winners

Brazil
Fourth title

== 2008 Grand Prix de Futsal Final Standings ==
- 01. Brazil
- 02. Argentina
- 03. Ukraine
- 04. Paraguay
- 05. Serbia
- 06. Colombia
- 07. Croatia
- 08. Czech Republic
- 09. Venezuela
- 10. Egypt
- 11. Uruguay
- 12. Mozambique
- 13. Angola
- 14. Chile
- 15. Peru
- 16. Canada
