= Marco Rodriguez (soccer) =

Canadian soccer player

Personal information
- Date of birth: 7 January 1992 (age 34)
- Place of birth: Toronto, Canada
- Position: Midfielder

Youth career
- 2009–2013: Club Atlético Platense
- 2014: Defensor Sporting

Senior career*
Years	Team	Apps	(Gls)
2014	Toronto FC Academy		
2015	Windsor Arch Ka I	10	(6)
2016	York Region Shooters		
2016–2018	Florida Tropics SC (indoor)	42	(10)
2017	Vaughan Azzurri	1	(0)
2018–2019	Mississauga MetroStars (indoor)	18	(11)
2019	Toronto Croatia		

International career
2016–2021	Canada Futsal	10	(1)
- * Club domestic league appearances and goals

Marco Rodriguez (born January 7, 1992) is a Canadian soccer player who plays as a midfielder. He has also played at the international level with the Canada national futsal team.

== Career ==
=== Early career ===
Rodriguez played at the youth level in Argentina with Club Atlético Platense from 2009 until 2013. After a successful trial with Defensor Sporting in 2013, he was accepted into the club's reserve squad. Following a year in Uruguay, he returned to Canada in 2014 and became involved with Toronto FC Academy in League1 Ontario. In his debut season with TFC Academy, he helped the club win the Inter-Provincial Cup after defeating CS Longueuil.

=== Asia ===
In 2015, he played abroad in Asia in Macau's Liga de Elite with Windsor Arch Ka I. His tenure with the club was short, as he departed for the last portion of the season. He would appear in 10 matches and record 6 goals.

=== Canada ===
He returned to Canada in 2016 to play in the southern Ontario-based Canadian Soccer League with the York Region Shooters. Rodriguez made his debut for the club on May 29, 2016, against Brantford Galaxy, where he recorded a goal. Throughout his stint with York Region, he assisted the club in securing the First Division title. He had another run in League1 Ontario in 2017, where he played with Vaughan Azzurri. In the summer of 2019, he participated in the Croatian World Club Championship with Toronto Croatia, where he played in the championship final where Toronto lost the match in a penalty shootout to SC Croat San Pedro.

=== Indoor ===
In 2016, he won the Futsal Canadian Championship with Toronto United Futsal.

He joined the professional ranks of indoor soccer for the 2016-17 season when he signed with Florida Tropics SC of the Major Arena Soccer League. He recorded a hat-trick on January 14, 2017, against St. Louis Ambush. Rodriguez received an honorable mention for week 12 of the competition. In his debut season with Florida, he appeared in 20 matches and recorded 8 goals. He returned for his sophomore season, where he appeared in 22 matches and recorded 2 goals.

When the MASL expanded into Canada, he was acquired by the expansion side, Mississauga MetroStars, for the 2018-19 season. He missed the opening match due to a buildup of suspension cards from his previous tenure with Florida. He made his debut for Mississauga on December 7, 2018, against his former club. Florida, where he also recorded his first goal for the MetroStars. He assisted Mississauga in breaking their losing streak of eight matches by contributing a goal against Harrisburg Heat, which marked the club's second win of the season. After an incident with a player in Harrisburg on March 9, 2019, he received a suspension for several matches. In total, he made 18 appearances and scored 11 goals.

== International career ==
Rodriguez was selected by head coach Kyt Selaidopoulos to help the Canada national futsal team qualify for the 2016 CONCACAF Futsal Championship in a qualification series against the United States. Throughout the futsal tournament, he recorded a goal against Curacao where the Canadians won the match by a score of 7-4. He was called up by Selaidopoulos once more, this time for the 2021 CONCACAF Futsal Championship. In the opening match for the national team, he helped Canada defeat Haiti. The national team managed to advance to the quarterfinals but was defeated in a penalty shootout by Panama.

== Personal life ==
Rodriguez was born in Toronto to Argentine parents.

== Honours ==
York Region Shooters

- Canadian Soccer League First Division: 2016
