= Francisco Cati =

Mexican footballer (born 1981)

Francisco Cati Balderrama (born 18 December 1981) is a Mexican former professional footballer who played as a defender. In 2007 he started playing for the Mexico national beach soccer team and represented it in tournaments, helping it reach the final of the 2007 FIFA Beach Soccer World Cup. In January 2021 he was appointed head coach of the Mexico national beach soccer team.
