= Daniel Chamale =

Canadian soccer player

Personal information
- Full name: Daniel Christian Chamale
- Date of birth: March 16, 1993 (age 33)
- Place of birth: Toronto, Ontario, Canada
- Height: 1.85 m (6 ft 1 in)
- Position: Defender

Team information
- Current team: Canadian Crusaders (indoor)
- Number: 2

College career
Years	Team	Apps	(Gls)
2013–2014	Humber Hawks	4	(0)

Senior career*
Years	Team	Apps	(Gls)
2013–2015	Serbian White Eagles		
2016–2022	Milwaukee Wave (indoor)	56	(11)
2024–	Canadian Crusaders (indoor)	21	(3)

International career^{‡}
2012–	Canada (futsal)	14	(1)
2017	Canada (beach)	6	(1)
- * Club domestic league appearances and goals as of April 11, 2026 ‡ National team caps and goals as of February 4, 2023

Daniel Chamale (born March 16, 1993) is a Canadian soccer player who plays as a defender with the Canadian Crusaders in Major League Indoor Soccer.

== Club career ==
=== Early career ===
Chamale played at the college level with the Humber Hawks for the 2013–14 season. During his stint with Humber College, he helped the team secure the national college championship.

In the summer of 2013, he played in the Canadian Soccer League's first division with the Serbian White Eagles. In his debut season with the Serbs, he assisted the team in securing the final postseason berth in the First Division. Their opponents in the preliminary round of the playoffs were Kingston FC where the White Eagles were defeated from the competition. He returned for another season in 2014, when once more the team qualified for the playoffs by finishing sixth in the division. Kingston once again defeated the Toronto-based team in the tournament's opening round.

Chamale re-signed with the Serbs for his third and final season in 2015. He would help the club win the divisional title. The Serbs would defeat London City in the preliminary round of the playoffs. Their postseason journey would conclude in the following round after a defeat by SC Waterloo Region.

=== Indoor career ===
In 2015, he played with Futsal Club Toronto, where he won the national Futsal Canadian Championship.

Chamale transitioned into the professional indoor level for the 2016–17 season by signing with Milwaukee Wave in the Major Arena Soccer League. He aided the team in qualifying for the playoffs, where they were defeated in the Eastern Conference final by Baltimore Blast. In total, he would appear in 20 matches and score 2 goals in his debut season. He would receive an All-Rookie honorable mention for his rookie season.

He would re-sign with Milwaukee for the following season. In his sophomore season with the Wave, the team clinched the Central Division title. However, their postseason journey concluded as the previous season in the Eastern Conference final, losing once more to Baltimore. Chamale renewed his contract with the Wave for the 2018–19 season. He assisted Milwaukee in securing the double where they defeated Monterrey Flash for the championship. During their championship season, he appeared in 16 matches and recorded 7 goals.

In 2021, he re-signed with Milwaukee for his fifth season. He would miss the majority of the season due to an injury.

In 2024, he began playing with the Canadian Crusaders in Major League Indoor Soccer.

== International career ==
Chamale made his debut for the Canada national futsal team on June 23, 2012, against Costa Rica in a friendly match. He was called to the national team for the 2016 CONCACAF Futsal Championship qualification against the United States. As the national team qualified for the tournament, he was selected for the team and recorded a goal against Curaçao in the group stages.

In 2017, he was selected for the Canada national beach soccer team to participate in the 2017 CONCACAF Beach Soccer Championship. Throughout the tournament, he recorded a goal against Mexico in the group stages.

Once more, he was selected to represent Canada in the 2021 CONCACAF Futsal Championship. The national team managed to advance to the quarterfinals but was defeated in a penalty shootout by Panama. In 2022, he was named the Canada Soccer Futsal Player of the Year.

Chamale was called up to the senior futsal team for his third futsal international tournament in the 2024 CONCACAF Futsal Championship.

== Minifootball career ==
In 2023, he played with Sports Leagues Canada FC at The Soccer Tournament, finishing in second place.

== Honors ==
Milwaukee Wave

- Ron Newman Cup: 2018–19
- Major Arena Soccer League Central Division: 2017–18, 2018–19

Serbian White Eagles

- Canadian Soccer League First Division: 2015

Individual

- Canadian Soccer Association Canadian Soccer Futsal Player of the Year: 2022
