= Canada national beach soccer team =

Canada
- Association: Canadian Soccer Association
- Confederation: CONCACAF (North America)
- Head coach: Kyt Selaidopoulos
- FIFA code: CAN
First colours
Second colours

Biggest defeat
- Brazil 12–1 Canada (Rio de Janeiro, Brazil; 30 January 1996)

World Cup
- Appearances: 3
- Best result: Quarterfinals (1999, 2006)

CONCACAF Beach Soccer Championship
- Appearances: 4 (first in 2006)
- Best result: Runners Up (2006)

The Canada national beach soccer team represents Canada in international beach soccer competitions and is controlled by the Canadian Soccer Association, the governing body for soccer in Canada.

== Players ==
=== Current squad ===
As of 13 February 2017

No.	Pos.	Player	Date of birth (age)	Caps	Goals	Club
1	GK	Vincent Cournoyer	28 February 1987 (age 39)			(Canadian Soccer Association) Royal Sélect Beauport
18	GK	Anthony Alves	10 June 1984 (age 42)			(Canadian Soccer Association) Peniche Community Club of Toronto
3	DF	Daniel Chamale	16 March 1993 (age 33)			(United States Soccer Federation) Milwaukee Wave
4	DF	Adrian Cann	19 September 1980 (age 45)			(Canadian Soccer Association) Scarborough SC
6	DF	Ian Bennett	27 August 1985 (age 40)			(United States Soccer Federation) Milwaukee Wave
3	MF	Jacob Orellana	9 February 1995 (age 31)			(Canadian Soccer Association) Toronto United
7	MF	Milos Scepanovic	28 June 1989 (age 37)			(Canadian Soccer Association) Serbian White Eagles
8	MF	Nazim Belguendouz	29 April 1991 (age 35)			(Canadian Soccer Association) FC Grenadiers
13	MF	Marc Jankovic	27 October 1980 (age 45)			(Canadian Soccer Association) Scarborough SC
9	FW	Danilo Pessoa	2 March 1990 (age 36)			(Canadian Soccer Association) FC Grenadiers
14	FW	Robert Renaud	14 March 1993 (age 33)			(United States Soccer Federation) Milwaukee Wave

== Achievements ==
- FIFA Beach Soccer World Cup Best: Seventh Place
  - 1996, 1999, 2006
- CONCACAF Beach Soccer Championship Best: Runners-up
  - 2006
- Copa Latina Best: Fourth place
  - 2003

== See also ==
- Canada men's national futsal team
- Canada men's national soccer team
- Soccer in Canada
