= Callum Weir =

Canadian soccer player (born 2003)

Personal information
- Date of birth: October 21, 2003 (age 23)
- Place of birth: North Vancouver, British Columbia, Canada
- Height: 6 ft 0 in (1.83 m)
- Position: Goalkeeper

Team information
- Current team: TSS FC Rovers

Youth career
- Yukon Selects FC
- Vancouver Island Wave

College career
Years	Team	Apps	(Gls)
2023–	Victoria Vikes	49	(0)

Senior career*
Years	Team	Apps	(Gls)
2021–2022	Blumenthaler SV	0	(0)
2023–2024	Harbourside FC	20	(0)
2024	→ Pacific FC (loan)	0	(0)
2025–	TSS FC Rovers	29	(0)
2025	→ Valour FC (loan)	2	(0)

International career
2024–	Canada (futsal)	2	(0)
- * Club domestic league appearances and goals as of October 7, 2026

Callum Weir (born October 21, 2003) is a Canadian soccer player who plays for TSS FC Rovers in the British Columbia Premier League.

== Early life ==
Born in North Vancouver, British Columbia, Weir moved to Haines Junction, Yukon at age four. Weir began playing youth soccer with Yukon Selects FC at age seven. He later joined the Vancouver Isle Wave.

In 2016, he played for Team Yukon in futsal at the 2016 Arctic Winter Games in Greenland. In 2022, he played for Team Yukon at the 2022 Canada Summer Games, where he was named to the tournament all-star team.

== University career ==
In 2023, Weir began attending the University of Victoria, where he played for the men's soccer team. On September 1, 2023, he recorded a shutout in his debut, in a 1-0 victory over the Thompson Rivers WolfPack. In October 2023, he was named both the Canada West and U Sports Player of the Week. At the end of the 2024 season, he was named a Canada West First Team All-Star.

== Club career ==
In August 2021, Weir signed with German club Blumenthaler SV in the fifth tier Bremen-Liga.

Ahead of the 2023 season, he attended pre-season with Pacific FC of the Canadian Premier League, on a trial. Afterwards, he joined Harbourside FC in League1 British Columbia. In June 2024, he joined Pacific FC as a short-term replacement player.

In 2025, he played with TSS FC Rovers in League1 British Columbia. In August 2025, he joined Valour FC in the Canadian Premier League, as a short-term replacement player. On August 2, 2025, he made his professional debut, starting against Forge FC.

== International career ==
In December 2022, Weir was called up to a camp with the Canada futsal team for the first time. He was later named to the squad for the 2024 CONCACAF Futsal Championship.
