= Canadian Soccer Association =

Governing body of soccer in Canada

CONCACAF
- Short name: CSA
- Founded: May 1912; 114 years ago
- Headquarters: 237 Metcalfe Street; Ottawa, Ontario
- FIFA affiliation: 1912–1926; 1948–present
- CONCACAF affiliation: September 18, 1961 (original member)
- President: Peter Augruso
- General Secretary: Kevin Blue
- Website: www.canadasoccer.com

The Canadian Soccer Association (French: Association canadienne de soccer; branded as Canada Soccer) is the governing body for soccer in Canada. Headquartered in Ottawa, Ontario, the federation is a full member of FIFA and governs Canadian soccer at the international, professional, and amateur levels, including: the men's and women's national teams, youth organizations, beach soccer, futsal, Paralympic and deaf national teams. The Canadian Soccer Association also administers and operates the Canadian Premier League, the Canadian Championship, and the Futsal Canadian Championship.

== History ==
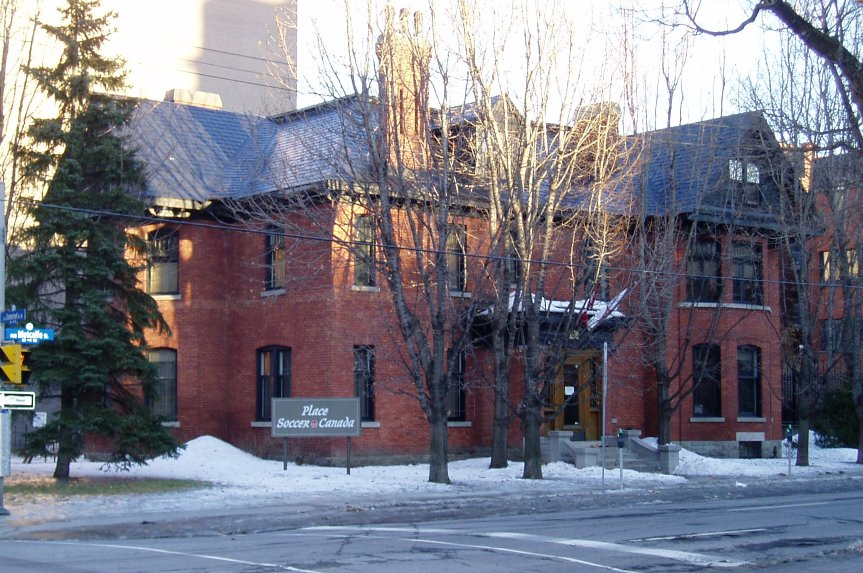
Place Soccer Canada in Downtown Ottawa is the headquarters of the Canadian Soccer Association

The Dominion of Canada Football Association, today known as the Canadian Soccer Association, was founded in Winnipeg, Manitoba, in July 1912. The organization joined FIFA on December 31, 1912. On June 21, 1926, the DCFA resigned from FIFA, only to rejoin on June 20, 1948. The governing body of the game retained that name until it was changed to The Football Association of Canada on June 6, 1952. The association later changed its name to the Canadian Soccer Football Association in 1958 and then at last to the Canadian Soccer Association in 1971.

Canada Soccer has hosted several global soccer tournaments, including the 1976 Olympic football tournament, the 2015 FIFA Women's World Cup, and co-hosted the 2026 FIFA World Cup along with Mexico and United States. The 2026 tournament was hosted in Toronto and Vancouver, with Canada becoming the first country to host five different categories of FIFA men's and women's national-team tournaments. The association has also hosted the FIFA U-20 World Cup (2007), the FIFA U-16 World Championship (1987), and the FIFA U-20 Women's World Cup (2002, 2014).

== Organization and governance ==
Canada Soccer is a non-profit organization governed by a board of directors consisting of 14 directors: a President, Vice President, six elected directors, and six appointed or independent directors. Each of the six elected directors is elected from one of six geographic regions. The board must include at least three men and three women.

Canada Soccer is administered by the General Secretariat. The general secretary is the chief executive of Soccer Canada, and is appointed by the board of directors.

Canada Soccer is a member of the worldwide soccer body FIFA and the North American soccer body CONCACAF and also has a relationship with the International Olympic Committee.

Canada Soccer's objectives, as described in its by-laws, are to:

1. promote, regulate and control the game of soccer throughout Canada, particularly through youth and development programs;
2. organize competitions in Association Football in all its forms at a national level, by defining the areas of authority conceded to the various leagues of which it is composed;
3. draw up Association Football regulations and provisions, and ensure their enforcement;
4. protect the interests of its Members;
5. respect and prevent any infringement of the statutes, regulations, directives and decisions of FIFA, CONCACAF and The CSA, as well as the Laws of the Game;
6. prevent all methods or practices that jeopardize the integrity of matches or competitions or give rise to abuse of Association Football;
7. control and supervise all friendly Association Football matches played throughout Canada;
8. manage international sporting relations connected with Association Football;
9. host competitions at international and other levels.

== National teams ==
=== Men's national team ===
The Canada men's national soccer team represents Canada in international soccer competitions at the senior level. The team has played in the FIFA World Cup on three occasions, in 1986, 2022, and 2026. Canada's best result came in 2026 where they recorded their first World Cup match win and reached the round of 16. The 2026 FIFA World Cup was jointly hosted by Canada, Mexico, and the United States and was the first 48-team event.

Canada also achieved international success by winning the 1985 CONCACAF Championship, which secured qualified for the 1986 FIFA World Cup, and the 2000 CONCACAF Gold Cup, which qualified the team for the 2001 FIFA Confederations Cup. Canada also qualified for and played in the 2022 FIFA World Cup. Additionally, Canada won a gold medal in the 1904 Summer Olympics, represented by a club team. The team also had a strong performance at the 1984 Los Angeles Olympics where it reached the quarter-finals and took Brazil to a penalty shootout.

Canada have competed in the CONCACAF Gold Cup 17 times, most recently in 2025. The country co-hosted the tournament in 2015, where the team finished fourth in their group and did not advance to the knockout stage.

=== Women's national team ===
The Canada women's national soccer team represents Canada in international women's soccer competitions at the senior women's level. Its most significant achievements are winning the 1998 CONCACAF Women's Championship to qualify for the 1999 FIFA Women's World Cup, and winning the 2010 CONCACAF Women's World Cup Qualifying to qualify for the 2011 FIFA Women's World Cup. The Canadian team also won a gold medal in the 2020 Summer Olympics.

The women's national soccer team has played at the FIFA Women's World Cup on eight occasions (missing only the inaugural 1991 edition), most recently in 2023. The team reached international prominence at the 2003 FIFA Women's World Cup, losing in the third place match to the United States. Canada hosted the 2015 FIFA Women's World Cup, and reached the quarterfinals.

The team has played at the CONCACAF W Championship on ten occasions, most recently in 2022. It hosted the tournament in 1994 and 1998.

Canada has played at the Summer Olympics on four occasions, most recently at the 2020 Summer Olympics in Tokyo, where they were crowned champions for the very first time.

=== Youth national teams ===
The men's youth team most significant achievements are winning the 1986 CONCACAF U-20 Tournament to qualify for the 1987 FIFA World Youth Championship, and winning the 1996 CONCACAF U-20 Tournament to qualify for the 1997 FIFA World Youth Championship.

The women's youth team most significant achievements are winning the 2004 CONCACAF Women's U-20 Championship, winning the 2008 CONCACAF Women's U-20 Championship to qualify for the 2008 FIFA U-20 Women's World Cup, and winning the 2010 CONCACAF Women's U-17 Championship to qualify for the 2010 FIFA U-17 Women's World Cup.

Canada Soccer Association oversees and promotes the development of many youth national teams:

- Canada men's national under-23 (Olympic) soccer team
- Canada men's national under-20 soccer team
- Canada men's national under-17 soccer team
- Canada men's national under-15 soccer team
- Canada women's national under-20 soccer team
- Canada women's national under-17 soccer team
- Canada girls' national under-15 soccer team

=== Extended national teams ===
- Canada national beach soccer team
- Canada national cerebral palsy soccer team
- Canada men's national futsal team
- Canada women's national futsal team

== Professional leagues ==
Despite a long history of professional soccer in the country, Canada have struggled to build and sustain domestic soccer leagues. They have gone through many different iterations, finally landing on the Canadian Premier League that was founded in 2019.

=== Men ===
The Canadian Premier League (CPL) is the top division of soccer in Canada. It is the only fully professional, and only fully national league in the system. Founded in 2019, the CPL is composed of eight teams and is sanctioned by the CSA. There are also three Canadian teams which play in Major League Soccer, the first-division league sanctioned by the United States Soccer Federation, reflecting a longstanding practice of major Canadian sports franchises competing in American leagues.

CSA does not have a sanctioned second-division men's soccer league; however, they do have a third-division sanctioned league: Premier Soccer Leagues Canada which was founded in 2022 (as League1 Canada). PSL Canada is contested by clubs from five divisions; these are Ligue1 Québec, the Ontario Premier League, the British Columbia Premier League, the Alberta Premier League, and the Prairies Premier League for both the men's and women's divisions. Ligue1 Québec and the Ontario Premier League also have a promotion and relegation setup with two lower leagues each, acting as unofficial fourth and fifth divisions in the Canadian pyramid. In 2022, Toronto FC II and Whitecaps FC 2 began play in MLS Next Pro, a USSF-sanctioned third-division league.

At the professional level, Canada's domestic cup is the Canadian Championship. Founded in 2008, the Canadian Championship is an annual tournament contested by Canadian professional teams and the champions of each League1 Canada division. The winner is awarded the Voyageurs Cup and a berth in the CONCACAF Champions Cup. Canada's best performance in the CONCACAF Champions Cup came in the 2014–15 competition, when Montreal Impact reached the finals. Toronto FC also reached the final in 2018 where they fell in penalties to C.D. Guadalajara.

=== Women ===
The Northern Super League (NSL) is the top division soccer league in Canada. The league began play in April 2025 and consists of six teams: Halifax Tides FC, AFC Toronto, Calgary Wild FC, Montreal Roses FC, Ottawa Rapid FC and Vancouver Rise FC. A seventh team based in Winnipeg is expected to begin play in 2027. The domestic cup for women's teams is the W Canadian Championship which was established in 2026.

The CSA previously had an affiliation with the U.S.-based National Women's Soccer League (NWSL) where some Canada women's national soccer team players were assigned to NWSL clubs. This affiliation ended after the 2021 season when the allocation system was abolished, although many Canadians continue to play in the American league.

=== Leagues ===
Professional leagues in Canada
League	Division	Federation	# of teams
Canadian Premier League	1	CSA	8 men's
Major League Soccer	1	USSF	3 men's
MLS Next Pro	3	USSF	2 men's
Northern Super League	1	CSA	6 women's

Semi-professional leagues in Canada
League	Division	Federation	# of men's teams	# of women's teams
Alberta Premier League	3	CSA	9	9
British Columbia Premier League	3	CSA	9	9
Prairies Premier League	3	CSA	6	6
Ontario Premier League	3	CSA	12	10
Ontario Premier League 2	3	CSA	12	10
Ontario Premier League 3	3	CSA	25	20
Ligue1 Québec	3	CSA	12	11
Ligue2 Québec	3	CSA	12	19
Ligue3 Québec	3	CSA	25	N/A

== Controversies ==
=== Sexual harassment ===
In July 2022, an independent review summarized in a 125-page report by McLaren Global Sport Solution, commissioned by Canada Soccer, concluded that Canada Soccer mishandled sexual harassment allegations in 2008 against then Canada U-20 women's soccer coach Bob Birarda, who was later found guilty of three counts of sexual assault. It said Canada Soccer was "described by many as being dysfunctional and inefficient" in 2007 and 2008, and concluded among other things that "harassment was not a priority issue amongst the senior Canadian Soccer Association leadership team" at the time.

In 2022, Canada Soccer's then newly appointed Secretary General Earl Cochrane said: "We are going to be leaders in this safe sport – through policy, practice, programs."

=== Drone spying scandal ===
On July 22, 2024, New Zealand's women's soccer team made a startling report to French authorities, claiming a drone had been flying over their practice sessions in Saint-Étienne. French investigators quickly traced the drone to Joseph Lombardi, a staff member of Canada Soccer.

The Canadian Olympic Committee (COC) confirmed that both Lombardi and assistant coach Jasmine Mander, had been sent home. In response, Canadian head coach Beverly Priestman issued a public statement clarifying that, while she hadn't "directed" the staffers responsible for the drone, she was stepping down from coaching the upcoming game. She also offered an apology to New Zealand, acknowledging that the actions didn't reflect the values her team stands for. Canada Soccer quickly launched an investigation into the matter, with FIFA soon announcing it would hold its own disciplinary hearings.

Canada Soccer's CEO, Kevin Blue, spoke to reporters, suggesting that, based on initial findings, the drone incident might not have been an isolated one, but part of a "systemic culture." He added that Priestman would not be coaching the Canadian team at the Paris Olympics.

Following their investigation, FIFA announced that Priestman, Lombardi, and Mander were all found responsible for "offensive behavior" and violations of fair play. As a result, the three were handed a one-year ban from all soccer-related activities, and Canada's national team was hit with a six-point penalty in the ongoing Olympics, making their already challenging route to the knockout stages even harder.

According to documentation from CONMEBOL’s disciplinary process, a member of Canada Soccer’s staff operated a drone over the ESPN Wide World of Sports Complex while another national team was conducting a closed training session during the 2024 COPA America weeks prior to the Paris incident.

Submissions made by the Canada men’s national team during the CONMEBOL disciplinary process argued that the staff member was filming an empty pitch, not an active training session. According to Canada Soccer’s explanation, the footage was intended for motivational and promotional video purposes, and the organization denied that the staff member had inappropriately filmed a closed training session.

The matter was adjudicated by CONMEBOL during the Copa América tournament. Following its review of the incident and the submissions provided, CONMEBOL imposed disciplinary measures for a violation of Articles 11.1 and 11.2 of the CONMEBOL Disciplinary Code related to integrity, loyalty, and sportsmanship and prohibits conduct that discredits football or seeks to obtain an improper sporting advantage.

== Executive committee ==
Role	Member	Notes
President	Peter Augruso	
General Secretary	Kevin Blue	
Vice-president	Paul-Claude Bérubé	
Treasurer	Steve Reed	
Corporate Secretary	Tim Hutzul	
Board Secretary	David Choinière	
Member	Kelly Brown	
Member	Tara Larsen	
Member	Terri Mattucci	
Member	Tony Delblond	
Member	Stephanie J. Geosits	
Member	Dominique Grégoire	
Member	Orest Konowalchuk	
Member	Brad Baker	
Member	Davide Xausa	
Member	Don Story	
Member	Gayle Statton	

=== Presidents ===
No.	Name	Tenure
1	Fred Barter	1912
2	Tom Watson	1913
3	Edward Bailey Fisher	1914
4	Hugh Craig Cambell	1915–1919
5	Tom Guthrie	1919
6	Dan McNeil	1920–1921
7	John Easton	1922–1925
8	John Russell	1925–1931
9	Tom Holland	1931–1932
10	Charles Smail	1932–1934
11	Len Peto	1935–1938
12	Tom Elliot	1939–1940
13	Fred Crumblehulme	1946–1947
14	Robert Walker	1947
15	Otis Todd	1947–1949
16	Charles Pinnell	1949–1953
17	Ernest Campbell	1953
18	Jock Hendry	1954–1956
19	Arthur Arnold	1957
20	Victor Hagen	1958–1960
21	Patrick Nolan	1961–1962
22	Dave Fryatt	1963–1964
23	Bill Simpson	1965–1968
24	Aubrey Sanford	1969–1971
25	John Barnes	1972–1973
26	Bill Stirling	1973–1981
27	Jim Fleming	1982–1985
28	Fred Stambrook	1986–1991
29	Terry Quinn	1992–1997
30	Andy Sharpe	2001–2005
31	Colin Linford	2006–2007
32	Dominic Maestracci	2008–2012
33	Victor Montagliani	2012–2017
34	Steve Reed	2017–2020
35	Nick Bontis	2020–2023
36	Charmaine Crooks	2023–2024
37	Peter Augruso	2024–present

== See also ==
- Canada men's national soccer team
- Canada women's national soccer team
- Canadian soccer league system
- Soccer in Canada
- Challenge Trophy
- Jubilee Trophy
