= Kyt Selaidopoulos =

Canadian soccer player

- Selaidopoulos in 2026

Personal information
- Full name: Kyriakos Selaidopoulos
- Date of birth: February 26, 1978 (age 48)
- Place of birth: Montreal, Quebec, Canada
- Height: 1.75 m (5 ft 9 in)
- Position: Attacking midfielder

Senior career*
Years	Team	Apps	(Gls)
1995–96	Chicago Power (indoor)	4	(1)
1997	Vermont Voltage		
1999–2000	Montreal Impact (indoor)	33	(5)
2000	Montreal Impact	5	(0)
2001–2003	Montreal Dynamites		
2004	Montreal Impact	10	(0)
2004–2005	Cleveland Force (indoor)	31	(8)
2005–2006	Milwaukee Wave (indoor)	28	(6)
2006–2008	Detroit Ignition (indoor)	51	(25)
2009–2011	Milwaukee Wave (indoor)	29	(14)

International career
2006–2013	Canada (beach)	11	(5)
2003–2012	Canada (futsal)	5	(2)

Managerial career
- 2016–: Canada (futsal)
- 2021–2026: Forge FC (assistant)
- 2026–: FC Supra du Québec
- * Club domestic league appearances and goals

Kyriakos "Kyt" Selaidopoulos (born February 26, 1978) is a Canadian soccer and futsal coach who serves as head coach and sporting director of FC Supra du Québec and head coach of the Canadian national futsal team.

As a player, he played in the USISL D-3 Pro League, National Professional Soccer League, USL A-League, Canadian Professional Soccer League, and the Major Indoor Soccer League.

== Playing career ==
Selaidopoulos began his career in 1995 in the National Professional Soccer League with the Chicago Power. In his debut season in the NPSL, he appeared in four matches and recorded one goal. After the conclusion of the indoor season, he signed with the Vermont Voltage of the USISL D-3 Pro League in 1997. In 1999, he signed with the Montreal Impact and played during the 1999–2000 indoor season, where he appeared in 33 matches and scored five goals. He featured in the 2000 outdoor season, but after suffering a groin injury, he only featured in five matches and soon after was released from his contract. In 2001, he signed with the newly expansion franchise, the Montreal Dynamites of the Canadian Professional Soccer League. With the Dynamites, he led his team to a fourth-place finish in the overall standings, thus qualifying for the playoffs. In the playoffs, the Dynamites faced St. Catharines Wolves, but were defeated by a score of 2–1, with the lone goal coming from Selaidopolous.

On April 14, 2004, he returned to Montreal Impact. During the 2004 season, he assisted in the team's record 12-game undefeated streak and won the A-League title, the club's second North American Championship in team history. He returned to indoor soccer by signing with the Cleveland Force of the Major Indoor Soccer League in the winter of 2004. He had further stints with Milwaukee Wave and the Detroit Ignition.

== Coaching career ==
In June 2011, Selaidopoulos was named the head coach of the Louisville Lightning in the Professional Arena Soccer League. However, prior to the start of the season, he resigned, due to a family matter.

He later became the Technical Director for CS Mont-Royal Outremont and was the provincial coach for Quebec futsal.

In February 2016, he was named the head coach of the Canada national futsal team.

In March 2021, he was named assistant coach of the Canadian Premier League side Forge FC.

In September 2026, he was hired as the sporting director and head coach for FC Supra du Québec.

== Honours ==
Montreal Impact

- A-League/USL: 2004
- Voyageurs Cup: 2004
