= List of men's national futsal teams =

This is a list of the men's national futsal teams in the world.

== Current FIFA affiliates ==
Map of the World with the six confederations.

There are currently 163 men's national futsal teams affiliated to the Fédération Internationale de Football Association (FIFA), the world's football governing body, through their national football associations. They are eligible to enter the FIFA Futsal World Cup and matches between them are recognized as official international matches. Based on their match results, the Futsal World Ranking, published weekly, compare the relative strengths of the national teams.

Each of these national teams is also affiliated to one of the six confederations, according to their continental zones:

- Asia - Asian Football Confederation (AFC)
- Africa - Confédération Africaine de Football (CAF)
- North and Central America and the Caribbean - Confederation of North, Central American and Caribbean Association Football (CONCACAF)
- South America - Confederación Sudamericana de Fútbol (CONMEBOL)
- Oceania - Oceania Football Confederation (OFC)
- Europe - Union of European Football Associations (UEFA)

Below is a list of the national football teams by their confederations. Some national teams are full members of their confederation, but do not have membership of FIFA; these are listed with a note explaining this. There are also notes of teams who have left one confederation to join another.

=== AFC (Asia) ===
Due to the geographical size of Asia, the AFC is subdivided into five sub-federations:

- West Asian Football Federation (WAFF) - represents nations at the western extremity of the continent. The WAFF has six members, but the AFC groups those non members into a single geographical region.
- East Asian Football Federation (EAFF) - represents nations generally agreed to constitute the "Far East".
- Central Asian Football Federation (CEAFA) - represents nations in Central Asia.
- ASEAN Football Federation (AFF) - represents nations from Southeast Asia, plus Australia
- South Asian Football Federation (SAFF) - represents nations from South Asia

- Afghanistan
- Australia^{1}
- Bahrain
- Bhutan
- Bangladesh
- Cambodia
- China
- Chinese Taipei^{2}
- Guam
- Hong Kong^{3}
- Indonesia
- India
- Iran
- Iraq
- Japan
- Jordan
- South Korea
- Kuwait
- Kyrgyzstan
- Laos
- Lebanon
- Macau^{3}
- Malaysia
- Maldives
- Mongolia
- Myanmar
- Nepal
- Oman
- Palestine
- Philippines
- Qatar
- Saudi Arabia
- Singapore
- Syria
- Tajikistan
- Thailand
- Timor-Leste
- Turkmenistan
- United Arab Emirates
- Uzbekistan
- Vietnam
- Yemen

They are 42 national teams of futsal in AFC

1: Formerly member of OFC (Joined AFC in 2006)
2: Official name of the national team of the Republic of China (Taiwan); OFC member 1975-1989
3: Official names used by FIFA and AFC; official names used by EAFF are "Hong Kong, China" and "Macau, China"

=== CAF (Africa) ===
Due to the geographical size of Africa, CAF is divided into six regional federations:

- Council of East and Central African Football Associations (CECACAF) - represents nations generally regarded as forming the regions of East Africa and some nations of Central Africa.
- Council of Southern African Football Associations (COSAFA) - represents nations generally regarded as forming Southern Africa, as well as island states off the coast of Southern Africa.
- Union of West African Football Associations (WAFU) - one of two bodies that represent nations in West Africa.
- Union of North African Federations (UNAF) - represents nations regarded as forming North Africa.
- Union des Fédérations du Football de l'Afrique Centrale (UNIFFAC) - represents some of the nations that form Central Africa.
- Union du Football de l'Ouest Afrique - one of two bodies that represent nations in West Africa.

- Algeria
- Angola
- Cameroon
- Comoros
- DR Congo
- Egypt
- Equatorial Guinea
- Ghana
- Guinea-Bissau
- Ivory Coast
- Libya
- Madagascar
- Mauritius
- Morocco
- Mozambique
- Namibia
- Nigeria
- Réunion^{1}
- São Tomé and Príncipe
- Somalia
- South Africa
- Sudan
- Tunisia
- Zambia
- Zimbabwe

They are 24 (23 FIFA members) national teams of futsal in CAF 1: Full CAF member but not FIFA member.

=== CONCACAF (North and Central America and Caribbean) ===
The CONCACAF federation is divided into three regional federations that have responsibility for part of the region's geographical area:

- Caribbean Football Union (CFU) - represents all nations in the Caribbean
- North American Football Union (NAFU) - represents the three sovereign nations of North America
- Union Centroamericana de Fútbol (UNCAF) - represents the seven nations of Central America

- Antigua and Barbuda
- Aruba
- Belize
- Canada
- Costa Rica
- Cuba
- Curaçao
- Dominican Republic
- El Salvador
- French Guiana^{1}
- Grenada
- Guadeloupe^{1}
- Guatemala
- Guyana^{2}
- Haiti
- Honduras
- Jamaica
- Martinique^{1}
- Mexico
- Nicaragua
- Panama
- Puerto Rico
- Saint Kitts and Nevis
- Saint Vincent and the Grenadines
- Sint Maarten^{1}
- Suriname^{2}
- Trinidad and Tobago
- Turks and Caicos Islands
- United States

They are 29 (25 FIFA members) national teams of futsal in CONCACAF 1: Full CONCACAF member but not FIFA member.
2: Geographically part of South America, but member of CONCACAF (CFU).

=== CONMEBOL (South America) ===
- Argentina
- Bolivia
- Brazil
- Chile
- Colombia
- Ecuador
- Paraguay
- Peru
- Uruguay
- Venezuela

They are all 10 national teams of futsal in CONMEBOL

=== OFC (Oceania) ===
- American Samoa
- Cook Islands
- Fiji
- Kiribati^{1}
- Tahiti
- Tonga
- New Caledonia
- New Zealand
- Papua New Guinea
- Samoa
- Solomon Islands
- Tuvalu^{1}
- Vanuatu

They are 13 (11 FIFA Members) national teams of futsal in OFC. 1: Associate member of OFC but not FIFA member

=== UEFA (Europe) ===
- Albania
- Andorra
- Armenia
- Austria
- Azerbaijan
- Belarus
- Belgium
- Bosnia and Herzegovina
- Bulgaria
- Croatia
- Cyprus
- Czech Republic
- Denmark
- England
- Estonia
- Finland
- France
- Germany
- Georgia
- Gibraltar
- Greece
- Hungary
- Iceland
- Republic of Ireland^{1}
- Israel^{2}
- Italy
- Kazakhstan^{3}
- Kosovo
- Latvia
- Lithuania
- Malta
- Moldova
- Montenegro
- Netherlands
- North Macedonia
- Northern Ireland
- Norway
- Poland
- Portugal
- Romania
- Russia
- San Marino
- Scotland
- Serbia
- Slovakia
- Slovenia
- Spain
- Sweden
- Switzerland
- Turkey
- Ukraine
- Wales

They are 52 national teams of futsal in UEFA. 1: Official name given by UEFA to the team representing Ireland
2: Formerly member of AFC (AFC 1954–1974; Joined UEFA in 1994)
3: Formerly member of AFC (Joined UEFA in 2002)

== Current AMF affiliates ==
=== CAFS (Asia) ===
- Bali
- Bangladesh
- China
- East Java
- South Korea
- Japan
- Macau
- Malaysia
- Sabah
- Sarawak
- Singapore
- Chinese Taipei
- Vietnam
- (West Papua (province)) West Papua

=== CAFUSA (Africa) ===
- Algeria
- Burundi
- Cameroon
- Ivory Coast
- Egypt
- Ethiopia
- Libya
- Mali
- Morocco
- Central African Republic
- DR Congo
- Rwanda
- Senegal
- Tunisia
- Zambia
- South Africa

=== CONCACFUTSAL (North America, Central America and Caribbean) ===
- Aruba
- Bonaire
- Canada
- Colombia
- Costa Rica
- Curaçao
- El Salvador
- United States
- Mexico
- Puerto Rico
- Sint Maarten
- Suriname
- Venezuela

=== CSFS (South America) ===
- Argentina
- Brazil
- Chile
- Colombia
- Ecuador
- Paraguay
- Peru
- Uruguay
- Venezuela

=== PANAFUTSAL (South America, Central America and Caribbean) ===
- Bonaire
- Curaçao
- Sint Maarten
- Argentina
- Aruba
- Bolivia
- Brazil
- Canada
- Chile
- Colombia
- Costa Rica
- Ecuador
- Mexico
- Paraguay
- Peru
- Puerto Rico
- Uruguay
- Venezuela

=== UEFS (Europe) ===
==== Full members ====
- Abkhazia
- Andalusia
- Aragon
- Armenia
- (Basque Country (autonomous community)) Basque Country
- Belarus
- Catalonia
- Czech Republic
- Denmark
- England
- France
- Germany
- Greece
- Italy
- Kazakhstan
- Latvia
- Norway
- Portugal
- Russia
- Slovakia
- South Ossetia
- Spain
- Ukraine
- (Valencian Community) Valencia
- (Autonomous Province of Western Bosnia) Western Bosnia

==== Associated members ====
- Australia
- Israel
- Saint Helena

=== Teams without confederation ===
- Abazinia
- Ambazonia
- Azad Kashmir
- Bulgaria
- Brunei
- (Autonomous Republic of Crimea) Crimea
- Donetsk People's Republic
- East Turkestan
- Federated States of Micronesia
- (Galicia (Spain)) Galicia
- Indonesia
- (Kurdistan Region) Kurdistan
- Luhansk People's Republic
- Marshall Islands
- New Zealand
- Palau
- Puntland
- Somaliland
- Transnistria
- Sweden
- Tibet
- Western Sahara
- Western Togoland
- (Yap State) Yap
- Yugoslavia
- Zanzibar

== See also ==
- List of FIFA country codes
