= 2016 CONCACAF Futsal Championship qualification =

The 2016 CONCACAF Futsal Championship qualification was a men's futsal competition which decided the participating teams of the 2016 CONCACAF Futsal Championship.

A total of eight teams qualified to play in the final tournament, where the berths were allocated to the three regional zones as follows:

- Two teams from the North American Zone (NAFU), including Mexico who qualified automatically
- Three teams from the Central American Zone (UNCAF), including Costa Rica who qualified automatically as hosts
- Two teams from the Caribbean Zone (CFU)
- The final berth was allocated to the play-off winner between a team from the Central American Zone and a team from the Caribbean Zone

The top four teams of the final tournament qualified for the 2016 FIFA Futsal World Cup in Colombia.

== Teams ==
A total of 18 CONCACAF member national teams entered the tournament. Among them, two teams qualified automatically for the final tournament, and 16 teams entered the regional qualifying competitions.

Zone	Teams entering	No. of teams
North American Zone (NAFU)	Mexico (qualified automatically for final tournament); Canada; United States	3
Central American Zone (UNCAF)	Costa Rica (qualified automatically for final tournament); Belize; El Salvador; Guatemala; Honduras; Nicaragua; Panama	7
Caribbean Zone (CFU)	Antigua and Barbuda; Cuba; Curaçao; Guadeloupe^{1}; Guyana; Jamaica; Sint Maarten^{1}; Trinidad and Tobago	8

Did not enter
North American Zone (NAFU)	None
Central American Zone (UNCAF)	None
Caribbean Zone (CFU)	Anguilla; Aruba; Bahamas; Barbados; Bermuda; Bonaire^{1}; British Virgin Islands; Cayman Islands; Dominica; Dominican Republic; French Guiana^{1}; Grenada; Haiti; Martinique^{1}; Montserrat; Puerto Rico; Saint Kitts and Nevis; Saint Lucia; Saint Martin^{1}; Saint Vincent and the Grenadines; Suriname; Turks and Caicos Islands; U.S. Virgin Islands

Notes
^{1} Non-FIFA member, ineligible for World Cup.

== North American Zone ==
In the North American Zone, Mexico qualified automatically as the highest-placed North American team from the 2012 CONCACAF Futsal Championship. The remaining two teams from NAFU, Canada and the United States, played in a two-match aggregate-goals play-off in Costa Rica on 4 and 5 May 2016, with the winner qualifying for the final tournament.

Times UTC−6.

4 May 2016
20:00

Canada	4–4	United States
Bennett 30'; DiMarco 36'; Belguendouz 37'; Orellana 38'	Report	Tayou 20'; Healy 28'; Santana 29'; Mattos 40'

BN Arena, San José

5 May 2016
20:00

United States	3–5	Canada
Dos Santos 15'; Donatelli 38'; Mattos 39'	Report	Renaud 14', 17', 29'; Harris 22' (o.g.); Bennett 25'

BN Arena, San José

Canada won 9–7 on aggregate and qualified for 2016 CONCACAF Futsal Championship.

== Central American Zone ==
2016 CONCACAF Futsal Championship qualification (Central American Zone)
Torneo Eliminatorio de Futsal de UNCAF 2016

Tournament details
- Host country: Guatemala
- City: Guatemala City
- Dates: 27–31 January 2016
- Teams: 6 (from 1 sub-confederation)
- Venue: 1 (in 1 host city)

Final positions
- Champions: Guatemala
- Runners-up: Panama
- Third place: Honduras
- Fourth place: El Salvador

Tournament statistics
- Matches played: 10
- Goals scored: 97 (9.7 per match)
- Top scorer: (Guatemala) Jonatan Arevalo (7 goals)

In the Central American Zone, Costa Rica qualified automatically as hosts. The remaining six teams from UNCAF entered the qualifying competition, played in Guatemala between 27 and 31 January 2016.

The draw for the qualifying tournament was held on 12 January 2016 in Guatemala City. Guatemala and Panama, which qualified for the 2012 FIFA Futsal World Cup, were seeded into Groups A and B respectively. The other four teams were placed in two pots, with El Salvador and Honduras in Pot 1, and Belize and Nicaragua in Pot 2.

The six teams were drawn into two groups of three teams. The group winners and runners-up advanced to the semi-finals, with the semi-final winners playing in the final and the losers playing in the third-place play-off. The top two teams qualified for the final tournament as the UNCAF representatives besides hosts Costa Rica, while the third-placed team advanced to the play-off against the third-placed team from the Caribbean Zone.

Times UTC−6.

=== Group A ===
Pos	Team	Pld	W	D	L	GF	GA	GD	Pts	Qualification
1	Guatemala (H)	2	2	0	0	19	4	+15	6	Semi-finals
2	Honduras	2	1	0	1	8	8	0	3	Semi-finals
3	Nicaragua	2	0	0	2	4	19	−15	0	

Source: UNCAF
(H) Hosts
27 January 2016
20:00

Guatemala	13–2	Nicaragua
E. Santizo 2', 21'; Santizo 9'; W. Ruiz 12'; Aguilar 19', 32', 37', 38'; P. Ruiz 26', 34'; Sandoval 28'; Alvarado 39'; Mansilla 39'	Report	Escoto 29'; Morales 37'

Domo Polideportivo de la CDAG, Guatemala City

28 January 2016
20:00

Nicaragua	2–6	Honduras
Palma 20'; Escoto 34'	Report	Moncada 4'; Raudales 9', 30'; Hernandez 28'; Alvarado 34'; Triminio 39'

Domo Polideportivo de la CDAG, Guatemala City

29 January 2016
20:00

Honduras	2–6	Guatemala
Triminio 8'; Rivera 10'	Report	Arevalo 6', 10', 29'; Mansilla 15', 22'; Santizo 16'

Domo Polideportivo de la CDAG, Guatemala City

=== Group B ===
Pos	Team	Pld	W	D	L	GF	GA	GD	Pts	Qualification
1	Panama	2	2	0	0	18	0	+18	6	Semi-finals
2	El Salvador	2	1	0	1	9	5	+4	3	Semi-finals
3	Belize	2	0	0	2	2	24	−22	0	

Source: UNCAF
27 January 2016
17:30

Panama	15–0	Belize
Sánchez 6', 30'; Rivas 7', 34'; J. Pérez 9', 28'; Goodridge 9', 17'; Castellon 12', 24', 34'; Atencio 19'; Hinks 23', 37' de Leon 26'	Report

Domo Polideportivo de la CDAG, Guatemala City

28 January 2016
17:30

Belize	2–9	El Salvador
Figueroa 17'; Valdez 24'	Report	Contreras 9', 15', 36'; Galicia 14', 18', 18'; Corea 14'; Solis 24'; Erazo 29'

Domo Polideportivo de la CDAG, Guatemala City

29 January 2016
17:30

El Salvador	0–3	Panama
	Report	Goodridge 9' de Leon 12'; J. Pérez 30'

Domo Polideportivo de la CDAG, Guatemala City

=== Semi-finals ===
Winners qualified for 2016 CONCACAF Futsal Championship.

30 January 2016
16:00

Panama	6–4	Honduras
Vega 23' (o.g.); Sánchez 29', 38'; C. Pérez 31' de Leon 32'; J. Pérez 34'	Report	Alvarado 7'; Triminio 14'; Hernandez 33'; Montes 40'

Domo Polideportivo de la CDAG, Guatemala City

30 January 2016
18:30

Guatemala	7–1	El Salvador
Coronado 14', 24'; Aguilar 25'; W. Ruiz 31'; Arevalo 32'; Alvarado 39'; Sandoval 40'	Report	Contreras 23'

Domo Polideportivo de la CDAG, Guatemala City

=== Third place play-off ===
Winner advanced to Central American Zone–Caribbean Zone play-off.

31 January 2016
16:00

Honduras	5–2	El Salvador
Triminio 9'; Moncada 19'; Corea 24' (o.g.); Montes 30'; Valeriano 33'	Report	Solis 1'; Sandoval 17'

Domo Polideportivo de la CDAG, Guatemala City

=== Final ===
31 January 2016
18:30

Panama	4–8	Guatemala
Goodridge 20'; C. Pérez 34'; Castellon 35', 36'	Report	Arevalo 6', 24', 40'; Ruiz 12'; M. Santizo 26'; E. Santizo 28'; Sandoval 34'; Alvarado 38'

Domo Polideportivo de la CDAG, Guatemala City

== Caribbean Zone ==
2016 CONCACAF Futsal Championship qualification (Caribbean Zone)
2016 CFU Futsal Tournament

Tournament details
- Host country: Cuba
- City: Havana
- Dates: 22–26 January 2016
- Teams: 8 (from 1 sub-confederation)
- Venue: 1 (in 1 host city)

Final positions
- Champions: Cuba
- Runners-up: Curaçao
- Third place: Trinidad and Tobago
- Fourth place: Guadeloupe

Tournament statistics
- Matches played: 14
- Goals scored: 92 (6.57 per match)
- Top scorer: (Trinidad and Tobago) Jerwyn Balthazar (8 goals)

In the Caribbean Zone, eight teams from CFU entered the qualifying competition, played in Cuba between 22 and 26 January 2016.

The eight teams were divided into two groups of four teams. The group winners played in the final and the runners-up played in the third-place play-off. The top two teams qualified for the final tournament as the CFU representatives, while the third-placed team advanced to the play-off against the third-placed team from the Central American Zone.

Times UTC−5.

=== Group 1 ===
Pos	Team	Pld	W	D	L	GF	GA	GD	Pts	Qualification
1	Curaçao	3	3	0	0	13	4	+9	9	Final and 2016 CONCACAF Futsal Championship
2	Trinidad and Tobago	3	2	0	1	13	7	+6	6	Third place play-off
3	Guyana	3	1	0	2	8	11	−3	3	
4	Antigua and Barbuda	3	0	0	3	3	15	−12	0	

Source: CFU
22 January 2016
16:30

Trinidad and Tobago	7–1	Antigua and Barbuda
K. Joseph 2'; Balthazar 11', 32', 40'; Neptune 14'; C. Joseph 16', 33'	Report	Philip 38'

Sala Polivalente Kid Chocolate, Havana
22 January 2016
18:30

Curaçao	5–2	Guyana
Espacia 18', 25'; Bernardus 19'; Pop 37'; Roosje 38'	Report	Mannings 22'; Phillips 23'

Sala Polivalente Kid Chocolate, Havana

23 January 2016
15:00

Guyana	3–4	Trinidad and Tobago
Mannings 33'; Phillips 33', 37'	Report	Joseph 5'; Balthazar 7'; Daniel 20'; Neptune 32'

Sala Polivalente Kid Chocolate, Havana
23 January 2016
18:30

Antigua and Barbuda	0–5	Curaçao
	Report	Everon Espacia 26:46, 37:14; Ashar Bernardus 27:34, 27:52; Shurwendel Roosje 38:49

Sala Polivalente Kid Chocolate, Havana

24 January 2016
15:00

Guyana	3–2	Antigua and Barbuda
Konata Mannings 4:01; Travis Grant 17:58; Jermine Jeffrey 32:42	Report	Eugine Kirwan 03:46; Novelle Francis Jr. 15:07

Sala Polivalente Kid Chocolate, Havana
24 January 2016
18:30

Curaçao	3–2	Trinidad and Tobago
Jean Pauletta 23:03, 30:12; Ashar Bernardus 39:13	Report	Ishmael Daniel 14:13; Jerwyn Balthazar 39:39

Sala Polivalente Kid Chocolate, Havana

=== Group 2 ===
Pos	Team	Pld	W	D	L	GF	GA	GD	Pts	Qualification
1	Cuba (H)	3	3	0	0	14	1	+13	9	Final and 2016 CONCACAF Futsal Championship
2	Guadeloupe	3	2	0	1	15	10	+5	6	Third place play-off
3	Sint Maarten	3	1	0	2	6	13	−7	3	
4	Jamaica	3	0	0	3	6	17	−11	0	

Source: CFU
(H) Hosts
22 January 2016
15:00

Jamaica	3–9	Guadeloupe
Michily Waul 9:05, 25:04; Anthony Marks 9:55	Report	Mickael Burlet 2:59, 12:32; Rohann Rambojan 3:17; Samuel Lantidor 3:55, 7:53, 21:19; Manuel Chaffort ? Ludovic Malacquis ? Loic Labuthie ?

Sala Polivalente Kid Chocolate, Havana
22 January 2016
20:00

Cuba	5–0	Sint Maarten
Ricardo Castillo 12:00; Jhonnet Martinez 19:07, 34:30, 35:40; Sandy Dominguez 19:41	Report

Sala Polivalente Kid Chocolate, Havana

23 January 2016
16:30

Sint Maarten	3–2	Jamaica
Raymond Wolff 0:34, 39:49; Rick De Punder 11:02	Report	Marvin Morgan 19:09, 37:07

Sala Polivalente Kid Chocolate, Havana
23 January 2016
20:00

Cuba	4–0	Guadeloupe
Sandy Dominguez 8:57; Karen Mariño 24:00; Brenieht Suarez 37:38; Ricardo Castillo 38:53	Report

Sala Polivalente Kid Chocolate, Havana

24 January 2016
16:30

Guadeloupe	6–3	Sint Maarten
Samuel Lantidor 0:14; Mickael Burlet 4:02, 38:09; Manuel Chaffort 11:38; Yvan Chicate 15:29; Ludovic Malacquis 19:41	Report	Raymond Wolff 4:29; Julius Richardson 9:28; Benoite Lacazette 12:30 (o.g.)

Sala Polivalente Kid Chocolate, Havana
24 January 2016
20:00

Cuba	5–1	Jamaica
Karen Mariño 1:01; Ricardo Castillo 7:14, 10:45, 17:14; Jhonnet Martinez 18:26	Report	Kemeel Wolfe 39:00

Sala Polivalente Kid Chocolate, Havana

=== Third place play-off ===
Winner advanced to Central American Zone–Caribbean Zone play-off.

26 January 2016
17:30

Trinidad and Tobago	5–4	Guadeloupe
Jerwyn Balthazar 5:17, 32:58, 37:21; Kerry Joseph 13:13; Jameel Neptune 38:05	Report	Benoite Lacazette 4:24; Mickael Burlet 23:47, 36:46, 39:51

Sala Polivalente Kid Chocolate, Havana

=== Final ===
26 January 2016
19:30

Curaçao	0–5	Cuba
	Report	Fernando Chapman 5:06, 28:17; Jhonnet Martinez 19:02; Karen Mariño 33:09, 34:28

Sala Polivalente Kid Chocolate, Havana

== Central American Zone–Caribbean Zone play-off ==
Honduras (Central American Zone third place) and Trinidad and Tobago (Caribbean Zone third place) played in a two-match aggregate-goals play-off in Costa Rica on 4 and 5 May 2016, with the winner qualifying for the final tournament.

Times UTC−6.

4 May 2016
17:30

Trinidad and Tobago	1–1	Honduras
Kerry Joseph 24'	Report	Oscar Lopez 6'

BN Arena, San José

5 May 2016
17:30

Honduras	5–3	Trinidad and Tobago
Juan Hernandez 3'; Luis Rivera 16'; Hasser Ortiz 16'; Carlos Montes 40'; Antonio Moncada 40'	Report	Kerry Joseph 3'; Ishmael Daniel 10'; Jameel Neptune 17'

BN Arena, San José

Honduras won 6–4 on aggregate and qualified for 2016 CONCACAF Futsal Championship.

== Qualified teams ==
The following eight teams qualified for the final tournament.

Team	Qualified as	Qualified on	Previous appearances in tournament^{1}
Mexico	Automatic qualifier	N/A	5 (1996, 2000, 2004, 2008, 2012)
Canada	North American Zone play-off winner	5 May 2016	1 (2012)
Costa Rica	Hosts	2 February 2016	5 (1996, **2000**, 2004, 2008, **2012**)
Guatemala	Central American Zone 1st place	30 January 2016	3 (1996, **2008**, 2012)
Panama	Central American Zone 2nd place	30 January 2016	3 (2004, 2008, 2012)
Cuba	Caribbean Zone 1st place	24 January 2016	5 (1996, 2000, 2004, 2008, 2012)
Curaçao	Caribbean Zone 2nd place	24 January 2016	1 (2000)
Honduras	Central American Zone–Caribbean Zone play-off winner	5 May 2016	0 (debut)

^{1} Bold indicates champion for that year. Italic indicates host for that year.
