= Belize national futsal team =

Belize
- Association: FFB
- Confederation: CONCACAF
- Top scorer: Ethnie Figueroa, Louis Valdez (1)
- FIFA code: BLZ
- FIFA ranking: NR (4 April 2025)

First international
- Panama 15–0 Belize (Windhoek, Guatemala City, Guatemala; 27 January 2016)

Biggest defeat
- Panama 15–0 Belize (Windhoek, Guatemala City, Guatemala; 27 January 2016)

FIFA World Cup
- Appearances: 0

CONCACAF Futsal Championship
- Appearances: 0

The Belize national futsal team is controlled by the Football Federation of Belize, the governing body for futsal in Belize, and represents the country in international futsal competitions.

== History ==
Belize organized its first-ever national futsal side to participate in 2016 CONCACAF Futsal Championship qualification.

== All-time fixtures and results ==
27 January 2016 2016 CONCACAF Futsal Championship qualification	Panama	15–0	Belize	Guatemala City, Guatemala
		Report	Maximillian Boll; Vilho Lawrence	Stadium: Domo Polideportivo de la CDAG

28 January 2016 2016 CONCACAF Futsal Championship qualification	El Salvador	9–2	Belize	Guatemala City, Guatemala
		Report	Ethnie Figueroa 17'; Louis Valdez 24'	Stadium: Domo Polideportivo de la CDAG

== Competitive record ==
=== FIFA Futsal World Cup ===
FIFA Futsal World Cup record
Year	Round	Pld	W	D	L	GS	GA	DIF
(Netherlands) 1989	Did not enter							
(British Hong Kong) 1992	Did not enter							
(Spain) 1996	Did not enter							
(Guatemala) 2000	Did not enter							
(Chinese Taipei) 2004	Did not enter							
(Brazil) 2008	Did not enter							
2012	Did not enter							
(Colombia) 2016	Did not qualify							
(Lithuania) 2021	Did not qualify							
(Uzbekistan) 2024	Did not qualify							
Total	0/10	0	0	0	0	0	0	0

=== CONCACAF Futsal Championship ===
CONCACAF Futsal Championship Record
Year	Round	Pld	W	D	L	GF	GA	Diff
(Guatemala) 1996	Did not enter							
(Costa Rica) 2000	Did not enter							
(Costa Rica) 2004	Did not enter							
(Guatemala) 2008	Did not enter							
(Guatemala) 2012	Did not enter							
(Costa Rica) 2016	Did not qualify							
(Guatemala) 2021	Did not enter							
(Nicaragua) 2024	Did not enter							
Total	0/8	0	0	0	0	0	0	0

== Current squad ==
The following players were called up for the 2016 CONCACAF Futsal Championship qualification in January 2016.

- Rugerri Trejo
- Darrell Novelo
- Thomas Baptist
- Ethnie Figueroa
- Mario Chimal
- Luis Valdez
- Nestor Cerpa
- Jorge Garcia
- Juan Carlos Saravia
- David Micheal Madrid
- Luis Avalos
- Jairo Lopez
- Cristian Orellana
- Kevin Botes
- Jorge Hidalgo
- Jony Gonzalez
- Luis Perez
- Cesar Gonzalez
- Henry Avilar
- Edmond Floyd Pandy
