= Mexico national futsal team =

Mexico
- Shirt badge/Association crest
- Nickname(s): El Tri (The Tri); El Tricolor (The Tricolor)
- Association: Mexican Football Federation
- Confederation: CONCACAF
- Head coach: Juan Pablo Vivanco
- FIFA code: MEX
- FIFA ranking: 83 (8 May 2026)
Home colours	Away colours

First international
- Australia 5–7 Mexico (Melbourne, Australia; 1 May 1994)

Biggest win
- Guatemala 2–8 Mexico (Guatemala City, Guatemala; 30 August 1996); Canada 1–7 Mexico (Washington, United States; 23 March 2002); Mexico 10–4 El Salvador (Pachuca, Mexico; 20 May 2004); Honduras 1–7 Mexico (San José, Costa Rica; 8 May 2016)

Biggest defeat
- Brazil 15–2 Mexico (Milwaukee, United States; 25 August 2002)

FIFA World Cup
- Appearances: 1 (First in 2012)
- Best result: Group Stage (2012)

AMF World Cup
- Appearances: 5 (First in 1991)
- Best result: 2nd round (1994, 2000, 2011)

CONCACAF Futsal Championship
- Appearances: 8 (First in 1996)
- Best result: (bronze) 3rd place (1996)

The Mexico national futsal team is controlled by the Mexican Football Federation, the governing body for futsal in Mexico and represents the country in international futsal competitions, such as the World Cup and the CONCACAF Championships.

Mexico has competed in the FIFA Futsal World Cup only once. Unlike 11-a-side games, futsal is not the strength of Mexico. The Mexicans now are struggling to emerge from the shadow of powerful regional rivals United States, Cuba, Guatemala, Costa Rica and recently is Panama. Despite making it to the semi-finals of the CONCACAF Futsal Championship on four occasions, the Mexicans have never done better than the third-place finish they managed at the tournament's debut edition back in 1996.

It was their fourth semi-final appearance at the 2012 CONCACAF Futsal Championship that Mexico booked their ticket to Thailand 2012 with some noteworthy performances against strong teams. Their campaign began with a valuable draw against Costa Rica and successive wins over St. Kitts and Nevis and Cuba were enough to see them through to the semi-final and guarantee them a place at their first ever FIFA Futsal World Cup, taking the second slot in their group after Costa Rica pipped them to first place on goal difference.

== Competitive record ==
=== FIFA Futsal World Cup ===
FIFA Futsal World Cup record
Year	Round	MP	W	D	L	GF	GA
(Netherlands) 1989	did not enter						
(Hong Kong) 1992	did not enter						
(Spain) 1996	did not qualify						
(Guatemala) 2000	did not qualify						
(Chinese Taipei) 2004	did not qualify						
(Brazil) 2008	did not qualify						
(Thailand) 2012	Group Stage	3	0	0	3	4	13
(Colombia) 2016	did not qualify						
(Lithuania) 2021	did not qualify						
(Uzbekistan) 2024	did not qualify						
Total	1/10	3	0	0	3	4	13

=== CONCACAF Futsal Championship ===
CONCACAF Futsal Championship record
Year	Round	MP	W	D	L	GF	GA
(Guatemala) 1996	Third Place	4	3	0	1	19	8
(Costa Rica) 2000	Fourth Place	5	2	0	3	13	14
(Costa Rica) 2004	Fourth Place	5	2	0	3	21	30
(Guatemala) 2008	Group Stage	3	1	2	0	12	8
(Guatemala) 2012	Fourth place	5	2	1	2	18	18
(Costa Rica) 2016	Group Stage	3	1	0	2	12	11
(Guatemala) 2021	Group Stage	2	0	0	2	8	10
(Nicaragua) 2024	Quarter-final	4	2	0	2	22	20
Total	8/8	31	13	3	15	125	119

== Current squad ==
Note: Flags indicate national team as defined under FIFA eligibility rules; some limited exceptions apply. Players may hold more than one non-FIFA nationality.

No.	Pos.	Nation	Player
—	GK	MEX	Jesús González
—	GK	MEX	José Luis Montoya
—	DF	MEX	Abraham Atri
—	DF	MEX	Esteban Mendoza
—	DF	MEX	César Paniagua
—	DF	MEX	Rigoberto Trujillo
—	DF	MEX	Eleazar Ureta

No.	Pos.	Nation	Player
—	MF	MEX	Francisco Flores
—	MF	MEX	Miguel Limón
—	MF	MEX	David Morales
—	MF	MEX	Emmanuel Morales
—	MF	MEX	Eddie Sánchez
—	MF	MEX	Miguel Vences
—	FW	MEX	Daniel Soltero

== Total ==
Until to 02/12/2018.

All	Pld	W	D	L	GF	GA	GD
Total	77	21	12	44	217	327	-110

== See also ==
- Mexico national football team record
- Mexico national football team schedule and results
- Mexico national under-17 football team
- Mexico national under-20 football team
- Mexico national under-23 football team
- Mexico national beach football team
