= 2026 Copa de Naciones Futsal =

International futsal tournament in Nicaragua

Copa de Naciones de Futsal 2026
Copa Centroamericana de Naciones de Futsal

Tournament details
- Host country: Nicaragua
- City: Managua
- Dates: 28–31 October
- Teams: 6 (from 1 confederation)
- Venue: 1 (in 1 host city)

Final positions
- Champions: Panama (1st title)
- Runners-up: Cuba
- Third place: Costa Rica
- Fourth place: Nicaragua

Tournament statistics
- Matches played: 9
- Goals scored: 51 (5.67 per match)
- Top scorer(s): (Cuba) Cristian Valiente (3 goals)

The Copa de Naciones de Futsal 2026, also known as the Copa Centroamericana de Naciones de Futsal, was the inaugural edition of Central America men's international futsal tournament. Hosted by Nicaragua and organized by the Nicaraguan Football Federation (FENIFUT), with the support of the Central American Football Union (UNCAF), the tournament was held from 28 to 31 October 2026.

Panama won the final against Cuba to win the maiden title.

== Participating teams ==
Five of UNCAF's seven member associations entered the competition, with Cuba participating as an invited nation.

- Costa Rica (39)
- Cuba (95)
- El Salvador (62)
- Honduras (NR)
- Nicaragua (92)
- Panama (35)

=== Squads ===
Panama	Costa Rica	El Salvador
1 Jorge Hernández (GK); 2 Jafet Alvarado; 3 Fernando Sánchez; 4 Alexis Castillo; 5 Ricardo Castillo; 6 Abdiel Ortiz; 7 Jesús Santos; 8 Ruman Millord; 9 Ángel Sánchez; 10 Alfonso Maquensi; 11 Didier Herrera; 12 Noel Hernández (GK); 13 Luis Vásquez; 14 José Yearwood	1 César Rosales (GK); 2 Josué Rojas; 3 Jeiner Ballestero; 4 Diego Chavarría; 5 Jean Salas; 6 Dilan Báez; 7 Pablo Rodríguez; 8 Yosel León; 9 Emanuel Gamboa; 10 Jeremy Gómez; 11 Daniel Gómez; 12 Alejandro Mena (GK); 13 Ramsés Coto; 14 Jorge Quirós; 15 Uziel Arrieta	1 Emerson Cañas (GK); 2 Miguel Torres; 3 Michael Coreas; 4 William Ayala; 5 David Sandoval; 6 Christian Mejía; 7 Cristian Valladares; 8 Rosemberg Ramírez; 9 Cristobal Osorio; 10 Samuel Muñóz; 11 Erick Martínez; 12 Ferid Murra (GK); 13 Carlos Artero; 14 Salvador Aguilar
Nicaragua	Cuba	Honduras
1 Kevin Sánchez (GK); 2 Leonardo Alvarado; 3 Manuel Mejía; 4 Adaly Lacayo; 5 Julio Espinoza; 6 Wesly Ruiz; 7 Lester Kripp; 8 Alexander Martínez; 9 Alejandro Sequeira; 10 Yesling Espinoza; 11 Bryan Corea; 12 Francisco Hurtado (GK); 13 Roberto Díaz; 14 Franklin Palacios	1 Kevin Rueda (GK); 2 Miguel Hidalgo; 5 Cristian Morejón; 7 Cristian Valiente; 8 Pablo Tamayo; 9 Dayán Cotilla; 10 George González; 12 Lipsam Sánchez (GK); 13 Iduan Martínez; 15 Yordanis Galán; 17 Marc Leyva; 18 Yadiel González; 20 Berni Llanes; Frannk del Valle; Diego Martínez; Jonathan Hernández; Dorgis Lara	4 César Mejía; 5 Marco Triminio; 6 José Varela; 8 Daniel Morazán; 10 Jean López; 14 Roberto Sorto (GK); Isaías Zúñiga (GK); Isac López; Jairo Zúñiga; Kevin Alemán; Miguel Baquedano; Leonardo Yescas; Eddy Fúnez; Jeremy Ramos; Jhosua Ramos

== Group stage ==
=== Group A ===
Pos	Team	Pld	W	D	L	GF	GA	GD	Pts	Qualification
1	Panama	2	2	0	0	6	2	+4	6	Final
2	Costa Rica	2	0	1	1	2	3	−1	1	Third place match
3	El Salvador	2	0	1	1	2	5	−3	1	Fifth place match

Source: FENIFUT
28 October 2026
15:30

Panama	4–1	El Salvador
Á. Sánchez 16'49", 32'09"; R. Castillo 25'16"; N. Hernández 39'15"	Report	Ramírez 11'55"

Polideportivo Alexis Argüello

29 October 2026
18:00

Costa Rica	1–1	El Salvador
J. Gómez 32'09"	Report	Valladares 4'07"

Polideportivo Alexis Argüello

30 October 2026
15:30

Costa Rica	1–2	Panama
Maquensi 38'49" (o.g.)	Report	Yearwood 6'00"; Millord 38'33"

Polideportivo Alexis Argüello

=== Group B ===
Pos	Team	Pld	W	D	L	GF	GA	GD	Pts	Qualification
1	Cuba	2	2	0	0	11	7	+4	6	Final
2	Nicaragua (H)	2	1	0	1	7	5	+2	3	Third place match
3	Honduras	2	0	0	2	5	11	−6	0	Fifth place match

Source: FENIFUT
(H) Hosts
28 October 2026
18:00

Nicaragua	4–1	Honduras
Mejía 12'31", 37'00"; Sequeira 18'46"; Palacios 18'57"	Report	Mejía 14'55"

Polideportivo Alexis Argüello

29 October 2026
15:30

Cuba	7–4	Honduras
Cotilla 1'39", 22'19"; Valiente 4'32", 14'57", 29'50"; Tamayo 32'43", 36'14"	Report	Mejía 28'00", 36'40"; Morazán 32'56"; Varela 39'55"

Polideportivo Alexis Argüello

30 October 2026
18:00

Nicaragua	3–4	Cuba
Kripp 7'21" (2pen.); Díaz 24'55"; Alvarado 25'43"	Report	I. Martínez 21'01"; Llanes 27'35"; Cotilla 33'34"; Galán 34'09"

Polideportivo Alexis Argüello

== Placement matches ==
=== Fifth place match ===
31 October 2026
13:00

Honduras	1–5	El Salvador
Triminio 6'47"	Report	Ramírez 12'11"; Muñóz 16'17"; Coreas 33'25"; Mejía 34'21"; Osorio 37'20"

Polideportivo Alexis Argüello

=== Third place match ===
31 October 2026
15:30

Nicaragua	3–3	Costa Rica
Kripp 19'53" (pen.); Espinoza 29'46"; Ruiz 33'07"		J. Gómez 1'19"; Báez 20'00"; Arrieta 39'44"
Penalties
Kripp (penalty scored); Corea (penalty scored); Alvarado (penalty scored); Lacayo (penalty missed); Palacios (penalty missed)	3–4	(penalty scored) J. Gómez; (penalty scored) Salas; (penalty missed) Rodríguez; (penalty scored) Báez; (penalty scored) Gamboa

Polideportivo Alexis Argüello

=== Final ===
31 October 2026
18:00

Cuba	1–5	Panama
Y. González 10'23"		Vásquez 12'32"; Herrera 29'06"; Castillo 31'02"; Sánchez 35'28"; Millord 39'46"

Polideportivo Alexis Argüello
