= 2016 CONCACAF Futsal Championship =

Campeonato de Futsal de CONCACAF 2016

Tournament details
- Host country: Costa Rica
- City: San José
- Dates: 8–14 May
- Teams: 8 (from 1 confederation)
- Venue: 1 (in 1 host city)

Final positions
- Champions: Costa Rica (3rd title)
- Runners-up: Panama
- Third place: Guatemala
- Fourth place: Cuba

Tournament statistics
- Matches played: 16
- Goals scored: 123 (7.69 per match)
- Top scorer(s): (Canada) Frederico Moojen (Costa Rica) Juan Cordero (Cuba) Reynier Fiallo (Panama) Claudio Goodridge (Panama) Fernando Mena (5 goals each)
- Best player: (Costa Rica) Edwin Cubillo
- Best young player: (Cuba) Diego Ramírez
- Best goalkeeper: (Panama) Daniel Atencio
- Fair play award: Costa Rica

The 2016 CONCACAF Futsal Championship was the 6th edition of the CONCACAF Futsal Championship, the quadrennial international futsal championship organised by CONCACAF for the men's national teams of the North, Central American and Caribbean region. The tournament was held in San José, Costa Rica between 8–14 May 2016. A total of eight teams played in the tournament.

Same as previous editions, the tournament acted as the CONCACAF qualifiers for the FIFA Futsal World Cup. The top four teams of the tournament qualified for the 2016 FIFA Futsal World Cup in Colombia as the CONCACAF representatives.

Champions Costa Rica, runners-up Panama, third-placed Guatemala and fourth-placed Cuba qualified for the 2016 FIFA Futsal World Cup as the CONCACAF representatives.

== Qualification ==
The eight berths were allocated to the three regional zones as follows:

- Two teams from the North American Zone (NAFU), including Mexico who qualified automatically
- Three teams from the Central American Zone (UNCAF), including Costa Rica who qualified automatically as hosts
- Two teams from the Caribbean Zone (CFU)
- The final berth was allocated to the play-off winner between a team from the Central American Zone and a team from the Caribbean Zone

Regional qualification tournaments were held to determine the teams joining Mexico and hosts Costa Rica at the final tournament, including two play-offs which were played on 4 and 5 May in Costa Rica prior to the final tournament.

=== Qualified teams ===
The following eight teams qualified for the final tournament.

| Team | Qualification | Appearance | Previous best performances | Previous FIFA Futsal World Cup appearances |
North American Zone (NAFU) qualified through North American qualifying competition
| Mexico | Automatic | 6th | Third place (1996) | 1 |
| Canada | Play-off winner | 2nd | Group stage (2012) | 1 |
Central American Zone (UNCAF) qualified through Central American qualifying competition
| Costa Rica | Hosts | 6th | Winner (2000, 2012) | 3 |
| Guatemala | Winner | 4th | Winner (2008) | 3 |
| Panama | Runner-up | 4th | Third place (2012) | 1 |
Caribbean Zone (CFU) qualified through Caribbean qualifying competition
| Cuba | Winner | 6th | Runner-up (1996, 2000, 2004, 2008) | 4 |
| Curaçao | Runner-up | 2nd | Group stage (2000) | 0 |
Play-off winner between Central American Zone third place and Caribbean Zone third place
| Honduras | Play-off winner | 1st | Debut | 0 |

== Venues ==
The matches were played at the BN Arena of Ciudad Deportiva de Hatillo in San José.

== Draw ==
The draw for the tournament took place on 16 March 2016 at 12:30 CST (UTC−6) at the Hotel Barceló San José Palacio in San José.

The eight teams were drawn into two groups of four teams. Tournament host and defending CONCACAF Futsal Championship champion Costa Rica were seeded in Group B, while 2012 runner-up Guatemala were seeded in Group A.

The draw took place before the final two qualifiers from play-offs (Honduras and Canada) had been confirmed.

| Pot 1 | Pot 2 |
|---|---|
| Costa Rica (Position B1); Cuba; Guatemala (Position A1); Mexico | Curaçao; Panama; Canada; Honduras |

== Squads ==
Each team could register a maximum of 14 players (two of whom must be goalkeepers).

== Group stage ==
The top two teams of each group advanced to the semi-finals and qualified for the 2016 FIFA Futsal World Cup. The teams were ranked according to points (3 points for a win, 1 point for a draw, 0 points for a loss). If tied on points, tiebreakers would be applied in the following order:

1. Goal difference in all group matches;
2. Greatest number of goals scored in all group matches;
3. Greatest number of points obtained in the group matches between the teams concerned;
4. Goal difference resulting from the group matches between the teams concerned;
5. Greater number of goals scored in all group matches between the teams concerned;
6. Drawing of lots.

All times were local, CST (UTC−6).

=== Group A ===
| Pos | Team | Pld | W | D | L | GF | GA | GD | Pts | Qualification |
|---|---|---|---|---|---|---|---|---|---|---|
| 1 | Panama | 3 | 3 | 0 | 0 | 18 | 7 | +11 | 9 | Knockout stage and 2016 FIFA Futsal World Cup |
| 2 | Guatemala | 3 | 2 | 0 | 1 | 13 | 10 | +3 | 6 | Knockout stage and 2016 FIFA Futsal World Cup |
| 3 | Mexico | 3 | 1 | 0 | 2 | 12 | 11 | +1 | 3 | |
| 4 | Honduras | 3 | 0 | 0 | 3 | 8 | 23 | −15 | 0 | |

Source: CONCACAF
8 May 2016
12:30

| Honduras | 1–7 | Mexico |
|---|---|---|
| Marco Triminio 14:24 | Report | César Saldívar 6:23, 12:28; Jair Alemán 17:05; Christian Hernández 19:53; Ángel Rodríguez 20:43; Miguel Resendes 28:49; Erick Tovar 29:42 |

BN Arena, San José
Referee: Victor Prendas (Costa Rica)
8 May 2016
15:00

| Guatemala | 1–4 | Panama |
|---|---|---|
| Patrick Ruiz 25:43 | Report | Fernando Mena 12:13, 22:43; Jorge Pérez 19:10; Claudio Goodridge 19:53 |

BN Arena, San José
Referee: Sergio Cabrera (Cuba)

9 May 2016
12:30

| Panama | 10–3 | Honduras |
|---|---|---|
| Josue Brown 7:13; Edgar Rivas 11:54; Carlos Pérez 15:41; Claudio Goodridge 19:08, 29:29, 36:00; José Vásquez 21:54; Ángel Sánchez 29:52, 39:56; Oscar Hinks 31:20 | Report | Antonio Moncada 11:44; Carlos Montes 25:01; Oscar Valeriano 30:14 |

BN Arena, San José
Referee: Shane Butler (United States)
9 May 2016
15:00

| Mexico | 2–6 | Guatemala |
|---|---|---|
| Jair Alemán 10:54; Christian Hernández 29:34 | Report | Roberto Alvarado 0:43; Rafael González 3:59; Miguel Santizo 18:25, 34:25; Carlos Merida 37:34; Wanderley Ruiz 39:20 |

BN Arena, San José
Referee: Roberto Sánchez (Cuba)

10 May 2016
12:30

| Mexico | 3–4 | Panama |
|---|---|---|
| César Saldívar 8:44; Christian Hernández 12:29, 39:59 | Report | Claudio Goodridge 20:38; Fernando Mena 28:32, 32:43; Carlos Pérez 34:29 |

BN Arena, San José
Referee: Jorge Flores (El Salvador)
10 May 2016
15:00

| Guatemala | 6–4 | Honduras |
|---|---|---|
| Jonatan Arevalo 8:12, 13:27, 20:30, 24:59; José Mansilla 11:37, 16:15 | Report | Luis Rivera 6:10, 25:11; Roberto Alvarado 18:17 (o.g.); Carlos Montes 31:40 |

BN Arena, San José
Referee: Lance Vahanitsma (United States)

=== Group B ===
| Pos | Team | Pld | W | D | L | GF | GA | GD | Pts | Qualification |
|---|---|---|---|---|---|---|---|---|---|---|
| 1 | Costa Rica (H) | 3 | 3 | 0 | 0 | 15 | 5 | +10 | 9 | Knockout stage and 2016 FIFA Futsal World Cup |
| 2 | Cuba | 3 | 1 | 1 | 1 | 8 | 11 | −3 | 4 | Knockout stage and 2016 FIFA Futsal World Cup |
| 3 | Canada | 3 | 1 | 0 | 2 | 13 | 14 | −1 | 3 | |
| 4 | Curaçao | 3 | 0 | 1 | 2 | 8 | 14 | −6 | 1 | |

Source: CONCACAF
(H) Hosts
8 May 2016
17:30

| Curaçao | 1–1 | Cuba |
|---|---|---|
| Ashar Bernardus 27:09 | Report | Karel Mariño 14:17 |

BN Arena, San José
Referee: Carlos González (Guatemala)
8 May 2016
20:00

| Costa Rica | 3–2 | Canada |
|---|---|---|
| Erick Brenes 19:36, 34:42; Alejandro Paniagua 21:17 | Report | Moojen 4:36, 35:36 |

BN Arena, San José
Referee: Francisco Rivera (Mexico)

9 May 2016
17:30

| Canada | 7–4 | Curaçao |
|---|---|---|
| Belguendouz 0:55, 28:56; Chamale 16:36; Rodriguez 16:51; Vahid Assadpour 20:17; Moojen 33:51; Eduardo Jauregui 34:55 | Report | Djuric Ascencion 5:36, 33:23; Every Janzen 15:33, 27:27 |

BN Arena, San José
Referee: Leroy Brown (Guatemala)
9 May 2016
20:00

| Cuba | 0–6 | Costa Rica |
|---|---|---|
| | Report | Yariel Sandi 6:27; Juan Cordero 13:37, 38:03; Erick Brenes 14:42; Edwin Cubillo 28:36; Diego Zuñiga 35:12 |

BN Arena, San José
Referee: Luis Aguilar (Panama)

10 May 2016
17:30

| Cuba | 7–4 | Canada |
|---|---|---|
| Reynier Fiallo 14:07, 26:45, 28:02; Daniel Hernández 28:56; Jhonnet Martínez 29:27; Reinier Socarras 36:08; Breniht Suárez 38:02 | Report | Bennett 17:21; Moojen 33:07, 33:23; Vahid Assadpour 35:20 |

BN Arena, San José
Referee: Shane Butler (United States)
10 May 2016
20:00

| Costa Rica | 6–3 | Curaçao |
|---|---|---|
| Edwin Cubillo 1:27; Juan Cordero 2:03; Yariel Sandi 5:47; Isaias Mora 7:11; Adonay Vindas 11:19; Christopher Molina 14:25 | Report | Jean Pauletta 9:18; Everon Espacia 18:03; Ashar Bernardus 38:50 |

BN Arena, San José
Referee: Carlos de la Cruz (Guatemala)

== Knockout stage ==
In the knockout stage, extra time and penalty shoot-out would be used to decide the winner if necessary.

=== Bracket ===
Semi-finals
May 12 – San José
Panama (a.e.t.) | 6
Cuba | 5
May 12 – San José
Costa Rica | 7
Guatemala | 1

Final
May 14 – San José
Panama | 0
Costa Rica | 4
Third place
May 14 – San José
Cuba | 2
Guatemala | 3

=== Semi-finals ===
12 May 2016
17:00

| Panama | 6–5 (a.e.t.) | Cuba |
|---|---|---|
| Michael de León 5:09; Ángel Sánchez 11:14, 13:12; Carlos Pérez 19:04, 33:07; Fernando Mena 41:16 | Report | Denis Márquez 14:57, 28:23; Jhonnet Martínez 20:39; Sandy Domínguez 24:28; Reynier Fiallo 32:44 |

BN Arena, San José
Referee: Francisco Rivera (Mexico)

12 May 2016
20:00

| Costa Rica | 7–1 | Guatemala |
|---|---|---|
| Juan Cordero 21:03, 22:42; Diego Zuñiga 21:58, 26:11; Edwin Cubillo 36:57; Alejandro Paniagua 37:27 (pen.); Stiven Solís 39:45 | Report | Edgar Santizo 34:28 |

BN Arena, San José
Referee: Sergio Cabrera (Cuba)

=== Third place playoff ===
14 May 2016
12:30

| Cuba | 2–3 | Guatemala |
|---|---|---|
| Reynier Fiallo 19:22; Luis Portal 32:59 (pen.) | Report | Miguel Santizo 2:04, 7:26; Marvin Sandoval 14:19 |

BN Arena, San José
Referee: Einer Arce (Costa Rica)

=== Final ===
14 May 2016
15:30

| Panama | 0–4 | Costa Rica |
|---|---|---|
| | Report | Alejandro Paniagua 10:20 (pen.); Christopher Molina 19:06, 26:18; Diego Zuñiga 33:09 |

BN Arena, San José
Referee: Francisco Rivera (Mexico)

== Winners ==
2016 CONCACAF Futsal Championship

Costa Rica
Third title

== Final ranking ==
Teams qualified for the 2016 FIFA Futsal World Cup

| Rank | Team |
|---|---|
| 1st place, gold medalist(s) | Costa Rica |
| 2nd place, silver medalist(s) | Panama |
| 3rd place, bronze medalist(s) | Guatemala |
| 4 | Cuba |
| 5 | Mexico |
| 6 | Canada |
| 7 | Curaçao |
| 8 | Honduras |

=== Qualified teams for FIFA Futsal World Cup ===
The following four teams from CONCACAF qualified for the 2016 FIFA Futsal World Cup

| Team | Qualified on | Previous appearances in tournament^{1} |
|---|---|---|
| Costa Rica | 9 May 2016 | 3 (1992, 2000, 2012) |
| Panama | 10 May 2016 | 1 (2012) |
| Guatemala | 10 May 2016 | 3 (2000, 2008, 2012) |
| Cuba | 10 May 2016 | 4 (1996, 2000, 2004, 2008) |

^{1} Bold indicates champion for that year. Italic indicates host for that year.

== Awards ==
The following awards were given at the conclusion of the tournament.

| Award | Player |
|---|---|
| Golden Ball | (Costa Rica) Edwin Cubillo |
| Golden Boot | (Canada) Frederico Moojen |
| Golden Glove | (Panama) Daniel Atencio |
| Scotiabank Bright Future Award | (Cuba) Diego Ramírez |
| Fair Play Award | Costa Rica |
