= National football team =

National football team may refer to:

== Sports ==
=== Lists ===
==== Association football ====
- List of men's national association football teams
- List of men's national futsal teams
- List of women's national association football teams
- List of women's national futsal teams

==== Rugby ====
- List of men's national rugby league teams
- List of men's national rugby sevens teams
- List of men's national rugby union teams
- List of women's national rugby league teams
- List of women's national rugby sevens teams
- List of women's national rugby union teams

==== Other codes ====
- List of national American football teams
- List of national Australian rules football teams

=== Websites ===
- National Football Teams, website
