= Honduras national futsal team =

Honduras
- Nickname(s): Los Catrachos; La Bicolor; La H La Garra Catracha
- Association: Federación de Fútbol de Honduras
- Confederation: CONCACAF
- FIFA code: HON
- FIFA ranking: NR (24 September 2026)
- Highest FIFA ranking: 68 (3 May 2016)
- Lowest FIFA ranking: 70 (13 July 2016)
Home colours	Away colours

First international
- United States 5–1 Honduras (Milwaukee, Wisconsin, USA; 18 May 2004)

Biggest win
- Honduras 6–2 Nicaragua (Guatemala City, Guatemala; 28 January 2016)

Biggest defeat
- Honduras 3–10 Panama (San José, Costa Rica; 9 May 2016)

FIFA World Cup
- Appearances: 0

CONCACAF Futsal Championship
- Appearances: 1 (First in 2016)
- Best result: Group stage (2016)

The Honduras national futsal team represents Honduras during international futsal competitions and is controlled by the Federación de Fútbol de Honduras. As of 2016, the team is integrated in its entirety from amateur players or college students.

== History ==
Honduras officially made their debut at the 2004 CONCACAF Futsal Championship against the United States, losing 1–7 on aggregate. Due to lack of interest and negligence from the Honduran Federation, the team has nearly never appeared in subsequent competitions. Their first ever win took place on 28 January 2016, when they defeated Nicaragua 6–2 in the 2016 CONCACAF Futsal Championship qualification in Guatemala City.

== Tournament records ==
CONCACAF Futsal Championship
Year	Record	Goals	Finish
(Guatemala) 1996 ↓ (Costa Rica) 2000	Didn't enter		
(Costa Rica) 2004	0–0–2	1:7	Preliminary round
(Guatemala) 2008 ↓ (Guatemala) 2012	Didn't enter		
(Costa Rica) 2016	0–0–3	8:23	Group stage
FIFA Futsal World Cup
Year	Record	Goals	Finish
(Netherlands) 1989 ↓ (Guatemala) 2000	Didn't enter		
(Chinese Taipei) 2004	Didn't qualify		
(Brazil) 2008 ↓ (Thailand) 2012	Didn't enter		
(Colombia) 2016 ↓ (Lithuania) 2021	Didn't qualify		
(Uzbekistan) 2024	Didn't enter		

== Head to head ==
- As of 10 May 2016

Opponent	Record	Goals
El Salvador	1–0–0	5:2
Guatemala	0–0–2	6:12
Mexico	0–0–1	1:7
Nicaragua	1–0–0	6:2
Panama	0–0–2	7:16
Trinidad and Tobago	1–1–0	6:4
United States	0–0–2	1:7
Totals	3–1–7	34:56

== See also ==
- Honduras national football team
- Honduras national under-23 football team
- Honduras national under-20 football team
- Honduras national under-17 football team
- Honduras women's national football team
