= CONCACAF Futsal Championship =

- Organizer(s): CONCACAF
- Founded: 1996; 30 years ago
- Region: North America, Central America and the Caribbean
- Teams: 12
- Current champion: Panama (1st title)
- Most championships: Costa Rica (4 titles)
- 2024 CONCACAF Futsal Championship

The CONCACAF Futsal Championship is the main national futsal competition of the CONCACAF nations. It was first held in 1996, and it is held every four years.

== Results ==
#	Year	Host	Final			Third place match			Teams
#	Year	Host	Champion	Score	Second place	Third place	Score	Fourth place	Teams
1	1996; Details	Guatemala City; Guatemala	United States	7 – 3	Cuba	Mexico	3 – 1	Guatemala	6
2	2000; Details	San José; Costa Rica	Costa Rica	2 – 0	Cuba	United States	5 – 1	Mexico	8
3	2004; Details	Heredia; Costa Rica	United States	2 – 0	Cuba	Costa Rica	12 – 5	Mexico	8
4	2008; Details	Guatemala City; Guatemala	Guatemala	3 – 3 (a.e.t.); 5 – 3 (pen)	Cuba	United States	7 – 1	Panama	8
5	2012; Details	Guatemala City; Guatemala	Costa Rica	3 – 2	Guatemala	Panama	6 – 4 (a.e.t.)	Mexico	8
6	2016; Details	San José; Costa Rica	Costa Rica	4 – 0	Panama	Guatemala	3 – 2	Cuba	8
7	2021; Details	Guatemala City; Guatemala	Costa Rica	3 – 2	United States	Guatemala	3 – 2 (a.e.t.)	Panama	13
8	2024; Details	Managua; Nicaragua	Panama	4 – 3	Cuba	Guatemala	3 – 0	Costa Rica	12

== Overall team records ==
In this ranking, 3 points are awarded for a win, 1 for a draw, and 0 for a loss. As per statistical convention in football, matches decided in extra time are counted as wins and losses, while matches decided by penalty shoot-outs are counted as draws. Teams are ranked by total points, then by goal difference, then by goals scored; this is the same as the competition's first three tiebreaking procedure criteria.

As of 2024 CONCACAF Futsal Championship

Rank	Team	Part	M	W	D	L	GF	GA	GD	Points
1	Costa Rica	8	36	29	3	4	184	73	+111	90
2	United States	7	32	18	6	8	115	68	+47	60
3	Guatemala	6	30	17	6	7	109	90	+19	57
4	Panama	6	29	16	4	9	116	89	+27	52
5	Cuba	8	36	14	8	14	130	106	+24	50
6	Mexico	8	31	13	3	15	125	119	+6	42
7	Canada	4	13	3	2	8	45	58	−13	11
8	Dominican Republic	2	7	3	0	4	32	24	+8	9
9	Suriname	4	12	3	0	9	43	85	−42	9
10	El Salvador	2	6	2	2	2	16	17	−1	8
11	Nicaragua	3	9	1	1	7	23	54	−31	4
12	Netherlands Antilles	1	3	1	0	2	5	11	−6	3
13	Trinidad and Tobago	4	11	1	0	10	30	70	−40	3
14	Curaçao	1	3	0	1	2	8	14	−6	1
15	Puerto Rico	1	3	0	0	3	2	13	−11	0
16	Honduras	1	3	0	0	3	8	23	−15	0
17	Saint Kitts and Nevis	1	3	0	0	3	5	22	−17	0
18	Guyana	1	3	0	0	3	6	24	−18	0
19	Haiti	3	8	0	0	8	12	54	−42	0

== Medals ==
Rank	Nation	Gold	Silver	Bronze	Total
1	Costa Rica	4	0	1	5
2	United States	2	1	2	5
3	Guatemala	1	1	3	5
4	Panama	1	1	1	3
5	Cuba	0	5	0	5
6	Mexico	0	0	1	1
Totals (6 entries)		8	8	8	24

== Qualification ==
#	Year	Games	Teams	Qualified Teams
1	1996 CONCACAF Futsal Championship	No Qualification		6
2	2000 CONCACAF Futsal Championship	No Qualification		8
3	2004 CONCACAF Futsal Championship	2004 Qualification	14	6 + 2
4	2008 CONCACAF Futsal Championship	2008 Qualification	6	2 + 6
5	2012 CONCACAF Futsal Championship	2012 Qualification	3	2 + 6
6	2016 CONCACAF Futsal Championship	2016 Qualification	16	6 + 2
7	2021 CONCACAF Futsal Championship	No Qualification		13
8	2024 CONCACAF Futsal Championship	No Qualification		12
Total	8	4	Max:16	Max:13

== Comprehensive team results by tournament ==
Legend

- 1st — Champions
- 2nd — Runners-up
- 3rd — Third place
- 4th — Fourth place
- QF — Quarterfinals
- R1 — Round 1
- Q — Qualified for upcoming tournament
- • — Did not qualify / Withdrew
- — Hosts
- – Not a CONCACAF member

Team	1996 (Guatemala) (6)	2000 (Costa Rica) (8)	2004 (Costa Rica) (8)	2008 (Guatemala) (8)	2012 (Guatemala) (8)	2016 (Costa Rica) (8)	2021 (Guatemala) (13)	2024 (Nicaragua) (12)	Years
Canada	•	•	•	•	R1	R1	QF	QF	4
Costa Rica	R1	1st	3rd	R1	1st	1st	1st	4th	8
Cuba	2nd	2nd	2nd	2nd	R1	4th	R1	2nd	8
Curaçao					•	R1	•	•	1
Dominican Republic	•	•	•	•	•	•	QF	QF	2
El Salvador	R1	•	•	•	•	•	QF	•	2
Guatemala	4th	•	•	1st	2nd	3rd	3rd	3rd	6
Guyana	•	•	R1	•	•	•	•	•	1
Haiti	•	•	•	R1	•	•	R1	R1	3
Honduras	•	•	•	•	•	R1	•	•	1
Mexico	3rd	4th	4th	R1	4th	R1	R1	QF	8
Netherlands Antilles	•	R1	•	•					1
Nicaragua	•	R1	•	•	•	•	R1	R1	3
Panama	•	•	R1	4th	3rd	2nd	4th	1st	6
Puerto Rico	•	R1	•	•	•	•	•	•	1
Saint Kitts and Nevis	•	•	•	•	R1	•	•	•	1
Suriname	•	R1	R1	•	•	•	QF	R1	4
Trinidad and Tobago	•	•	R1	R1	•	•	R1	R1	4
United States	1st	3rd	1st	3rd	R1	•	2nd	QF	7

== FIFA Futsal World Cup Qualifiers ==
Legend

- 1st – Champions
- 2nd – Runners-up
- 3rd – Third place
- 4th – Fourth place
- QF – Quarterfinals
- R2 – Round 2 (1989–2008, second group stage, top 8; 2012–present: knockout round of 16)
- R1 – Round 1
- – Hosts
- Q – Qualified for upcoming tournament

Team	(Netherlands) 1989	(Hong Kong) 1992	(Spain) 1996	(Guatemala) 2000	(Chinese Taipei) 2004	(Brazil) 2008	(Thailand) 2012	(Colombia) 2016	(Lithuania) 2021	(Uzbekistan) 2024	2028	Total
Canada	R1											1
Costa Rica		R1		R1			R1	R2	R1	R2		6
Cuba			R1	R1	R1	R1		R1		R1		6
Guatemala				R1		R1	R1	R1	R1	R1		6
Mexico							R1					1
Panama							R2	R1	R1	R1		4
United States	3rd	2nd	R1		R2	R1			R1			6

== See also ==
- CONCACAF Beach Soccer Championship
