= Rogério Alves =

Brazilian futsal player

Rogério
Personal information
- Full name: Rogério Santana Alves
- Date of birth: 20 September 1973 (age 53)
- Place of birth: Simão Dias, Sergipe, Brazil
- Height: 1.70 m (5 ft 7 in)
- Position: Goalkeeper

Senior career*
Years	Team	Apps	(Gls)
1991–1992	Banespa		
1994–1997	Santa Cruz		
1998–2000	Atlético Mineiro		
2001–2003	Ulbra Canoas		
2004–2009	Joinville		

International career
2000–2008	Brazil		
Medal record
Men's futsal
Representing Brazil
Pan American Games
Gold medal – first place	2007 Rio de Janeiro	Men's
- * Club domestic league appearances and goals as of 13 September 2024

Rogério Santana Alves (born 20 September 1973), simply known as Rogério, is a Brazilian retired professional futsal player who played as a goalkeeper.

== Career ==
Born in Simão Dias, Sergipe, Rogério started playing futsal as a joke, but ended up catching the attention of some scouts. In 1991 he was invited to become a professional by EC Banespa, and remained in São Paulo until 1992. In 1993 he returned to his home state when he thought about abandoning his career, but returned to the courts with the Santa Cruz futsal team, which he defended from 1994 to 1997. Also played for Atlético Mineiro, Ulbra Canoas and Krona/Joinville.

After retiring professionally in 2009, he still defended some municipal teams in the Copa TV Sergipe de Futsal (affiliated with Grupo Globo), being champion for the cities of Moita Bonita, Itaporanga d'Ajuda and Lagarto.

== Honours ==
=== Professional ===
Atlético Mineiro

- Intercontinental Futsal Cup: 1998
- Liga Nacional de Futsal: 1999

Brazil

- Pan American Games: 2007
- FIFA Futsal World Cup: 2008
- Copa América de Futsal: 2000, 2008

=== Amateur ===
- Copa TV Sergipe de Futsal: 2011, 2014, 2015, 2017, 2018
