= Bęben =

Bęben is a Polish surname. Notable people with the surname include:

- Marek Bęben (born 1958), Polish footballer
- Józefa Ledwig-Bęben (born 1935), Polish volleyball player
- Wojciech Bęben (born 1949), Polish anthropologist, ethnographer, ethnologist, and Roman Catholic priest
