= Guadeloupe national futsal team =

Guadeloupe
- Nickname(s): Les Gwada Boys
- Association: Ligue Guadeloupéenne de Football (LGF)
- Confederation: CONCACAF
Home colours	Away colours

First international
- Martinique 6–0 Guadeloupe (Martinique; Date

The Guadeloupe national futsal team is controlled by the Ligue Guadeloupéenne de Football, the governing body for futsal in Guadeloupe and represents the country in international futsal competitions, such as the CONCACAF Championships.

== Tournaments ==
=== CONCACAF Futsal Championship ===
- 1996 - did not qualify
- 2000 - did not qualify
- 2004 - did not qualify
- 2008 - did not qualify
- 2012 - did not qualify
- 2016 - did not qualify
