= Sebastian Leszczak =

Polish footballer

Personal information
- Full name: Sebastian Marcin Leszczak
- Date of birth: 20 January 1992 (age 34)
- Place of birth: Kraków, Poland
- Height: 1.73 m (5 ft 8 in)
- Position: Winger

Team information
- Current team: BSF Bochnia
- Number: 10

Youth career
- 2001–2003: Clepardia Kraków
- 2004–2009: Wisła Kraków

Senior career*
Years	Team	Apps	(Gls)
2009–2010	Wisła Kraków	3	(0)
2010–2016	Górnik Zabrze	0	(0)
2011–2013	→ Garbarnia Kraków (loan)	67	(7)
2014	→ Kolejarz Stróże (loan)	13	(0)
2014–2015	→ Poroniec Poronin (loan)	35	(7)
2014–2015	BSF Bochnia (futsal)	19	(38)
2016	Górnik Zabrze II	12	(3)
2016	Sandecja Nowy Sącz	9	(0)
2017	LEX Kancelaria Słomniki (futsal)	21	(26)
2018–2021	Clearex Chorzów (futsal)	89	(92)
2021–2023	Rekord Bielsko-Biała (futsal)	53	(34)
2023–	BSF Bochnia (futsal)	34	(19)

International career
- Poland U18
- Poland U19
2018–	Poland (futsal)		
- * Club domestic league appearances and goals as of 16:17, 17 February 2025 (UTC)

Sebastian Leszczak (born 20 January 1992) is a Polish futsal player and former professional footballer who plays for BSF Bochnia and the Poland national team.

== Career ==
Previously he played for Wisła Kraków, making his Ekstraklasa debut in November 2009. His contract with the club expired at the start of 2010. In January 2010, the club attempted to suspend him for half a year for training with another club, however the PZPN overturned the decision on appeal in March. In June, he signed a three-year contract with the newly promoted Ekstraklasa side Górnik Zabrze.
