= Bartosz Łeszyk =

Polish futsal player

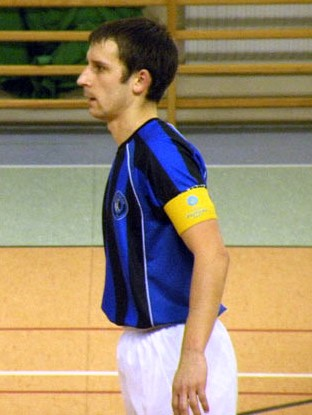

Personal information
- Full name: Bartosz Łeszyk
- Date of birth: 4 December 1980 (age 45)
- Place of birth: Poznań, Poland
- Height: 1.71 m (5 ft 7 in)
- Position: Midfielder

Team information
- Current team: Akademia Słowa
- Number: 14

Senior career*
Years	Team	Apps	(Gls)
- Lechita Kłecko
- Warta Poznań
2008–	Akademia Słowa		

International career
2007–	Poland		
- * Club domestic league appearances and goals

Bartosz Łeszyk (born 4 December 1980 in Poznań) is a Polish futsal player who plays for Akademia Futsal Club. He has represented the Poland national futsal team multiple times, including qualifying matches for the 2007 UEFA Futsal Championship.

He has also played 11-a-side football for Warta Poznań and Lechita Kłecko in Poland.
