= Joel Shanker =

American soccer player

Personal information
- Date of birth: August 14, 1971 (age 55)
- Place of birth: St. Louis, Missouri, United States
- Height: 5 ft 9 in (1.75 m)
- Position: Forward

Youth career
- 1991–1994: Indiana Hoosiers

Senior career*
Years	Team	Apps	(Gls)
1995–1996	Detroit Neon	48	(38)
1995–1999	St. Louis Ambush	93	(55)
1999–2000	Philadelphia KiXX	14	(4)
2000–2001	Detroit Rockers	42	(28)
2001–2005	Philadelphia KiXX	107	(90)
Total		313	(215)

International career
2004	U.S. Futsal		
- * Club domestic league appearances and goals

Joel Shanker (born August 14, 1971) is a retired American soccer forward who spent his entire professional career in the U.S. indoor leagues. He was a three time MISL All Star and was a member of the U.S. national futsal team at the 2004 FIFA Futsal World Championship.

== Youth ==
Shanker grew up in St. Louis where he played soccer at Parkway Central High School. He graduated in 1990. He then attended Indiana University where he played on the men's soccer team from 1991 to 1994. In 1994, the Hoosiers went to the NCAA championship game where they lost to the University of Virginia.

== Professional ==
In 1995, Shanker signed with the Detroit Neon in the Continental Indoor Soccer League. He remained with the Neon through the 1995 season. That fall, he moved to the St. Louis Ambush in the National Professional Soccer League, playing the 1995–1996 season with them. In February 1996, the Colorado Rapids selected Shanker in the 16th round (152nd overall) of the 1996 MLS Inaugural Player Draft. The Rapids released Shanker on March 25, 1996, during its final pre-season roster reduction. He returned to the Ambush for the next two NPSL seasons. In 1999, Shanker began the season with the Philadelphia KiXX. On January 30, 2000, the KiXX sent Shanker and Genoni Martinez to the Detroit Rockers in exchange for Bojan Vuckovic. He played for the Rockers through the 2000–2001 season. The Rockers folded at the end of the seasons and on September 11, 2001, the KiXX selected Shanker in the MISL Dispersal Draft. He finished his career with four seasons in Philadelphia. In 2002, he was the MVP of the MISL All Star Game.

== Futsal ==
In 2004, Shanker was selected to the U.S. national futsal team which competed at the 2004 FIFA Futsal World Championship. He played six games in the finals as the U.S. went to the 1–1–4.
