= Jorginho (futsal player) =

Brazilian futsal player

Personal information
- Full name: Jorge Luiz da Costa Pimentel
- Date of birth: 10 October 1968 (age 58)
- Place of birth: Brazil
- Height: 1.67 m (5 ft 6 in)
- Position: Pivot

Youth career
- 1970s: Riachuelo

Senior career*
Years	Team	Apps	(Gls)
1980s	Mackenzie		
1980s	Social Ramos		
1980s	Cariocas da Gávea		
1980s	Bradesco		
1980s	Vanel		
1980s	Tênis da Piedade		
1990s	Grêmio		
1992	Banfort		
1993–1996	Enxuta Futsal		
1997	SE Votorantim		
1998	Atlético Mineiro		
1998–2001	GKI-Gazprom		
2002	VIZ-Sinara		
2004	Norilsk Nickel		
2004–2005	Spartak Moscow		

International career
1991–1996	Brazil		
- * Club domestic league appearances and goals

Jorge Luiz da Costa Pimentel (born 10 October 1968), simply known as Jorginho, is a Brazilian retired professional futsal player who played as a pivot.

== Career ==
Jorginho began his career at Riachuelo, in Rio de Janeiro, and later played for the clubs Mackenzie, Social Ramos, Cariocas da Gávea and Tênis da Piedade in the city, still in the 1980s. He also worked for Bradesco and Vanel in São Paulo. While playing for Banfort from Ceará he was chosen to play for the Brazilian national team at 1992 World Cup. In Rio Grande do Sul he had greater success, playing for Enxuta Futsal from Caxias do Sul, a team for which he won more titles. He also had a notable spell at Atlético Mineiro and GKI-Gazprom, with Jorginho being the first Brazilian futsal player to play in Russia.

For the Brazil futsal team, he was considered largely responsible for winning the 1992 FIFA Futsal World Cup, a competition in which he was elected the best player.

== Honours ==
Enxuta Futsal

- Taça Brasil de Futsal: 1995, 1996
- Campeonato Gaúcho de Futsal: 1993, 1994, 1995

Atlético Mineiro

- Intercontinental Futsal Cup: 1998
- Campeonato Mineiro de Futsal: 1998

GKI-Gazprom

- Russian Cup: 2000–01

Brazil

- FIFA Futsal World Cup: 1992
- Copa América de Futsal: 1992, 1995, 1996
- Futsal Mundialito: 1995, 1996

Awards

- 1992 FIFA Futsal World Championship Best Player
