= Poland national futsal team =

Poland
- Nickname(s): Biało-czerwoni (The white and reds); Białe Orły (The White Eagles)
- Association: Polish Football Association (Polski Związek Piłki Nożnej)
- Confederation: UEFA (Europe)
- Head coach: Błażej Korczyński
- Captain: Tomasz Kriezel
- Most caps: Michał Kubik (165)
- FIFA code: POL
- FIFA ranking: 27 ▼8 (8 May 2026)
Home colours	Away colours

First international
- CIS 7–7 Poland (Burjassot, Spain; 21 April 1992)

Biggest win
- Poland 16–0 England (Krosno, Poland, 23 October 2006)

Biggest defeat
- Russia 10–1 Poland (Moscow, Russia; 6 February 2003); Poland 2–11 Italy (Sarajevo, BIH; 30 January 2004)

FIFA World Cup
- Appearances: 1 (First in 1992)
- Best result: Second round (1992)

European Championship
- Appearances: 3 (First in 2001)
- Best result: First round (2001)

Grand Prix de Futsal
- Appearances: 0

The Poland national futsal team represents Poland in international futsal competitions, such as the FIFA Futsal World Cup and the European Championships. It is controlled by the Polish Football Association, the governing body for futsal in Poland.

== Competitive record ==
=== FIFA Futsal World Cup ===
FIFA Futsal World Cup record
Year	Round	Position	Pld	W	D	L	GF	GA
(Netherlands) 1989	Did not enter							
(Hong Kong) 1992	2nd round	8th	6	2	0	4	15	22
(Spain) 1996	Did not qualify							
(Guatemala) 2000	Did not qualify							
(Taiwan) 2004	Did not qualify							
(Brazil) 2008	Did not qualify							
(Thailand) 2012	Did not qualify							
(Colombia) 2016	Did not qualify							
(Lithuania) 2021	Did not qualify							
(Uzbekistan) 2024	Did not qualify							
Total:1/10	2nd round	8th	6	2	0	4	15	22

=== UEFA European Futsal Championship ===
UEFA European Futsal Championship record
Year	Round	Position	Pld	W	D	L	GF	GA
(Spain) 1996	Did not qualify							
(Spain) 1999	Did not qualify							
(Russia) 2001	Group stage	8th	3	0	0	3	6	18
(Italy) 2003	Did not qualify							
(Czech Republic) 2005	Did not qualify							
(Portugal) 2007	Did not qualify							
(Hungary) 2010	Did not qualify							
(Croatia) 2012	Did not qualify							
(Belgium) 2014	Did not qualify							
(Serbia) 2016	Did not qualify							
(Slovenia) 2018	Group stage	11th	2	0	1	1	2	6
(Netherlands) 2022	Group stage	15th	3	0	1	2	4	10
(Latvia) / (Lithuania) / (Slovenia) 2026	Group stage	16th	3	0	0	3	4	11
Total: 4/13	Group stage	8th	11	0	2	9	16	45

=== Grand Prix de Futsal ===
Grand Prix de Futsal record
Year	Round	Position	Pld	W	D	L	GF	GA
(Brazil) 2005	Did not enter							
(Brazil) 2006	Did not enter							
(Brazil) 2007	Did not enter							
(Brazil) 2008	Did not enter							
(Brazil) 2009	Did not enter							
(Brazil) 2010	Did not enter							
(Brazil) 2011	Did not enter							
(Brazil) 2013	Did not enter							
(Brazil) 2014	Did not enter							
(Brazil) 2015	Did not enter							
(Brazil) 2017	Did not enter							
Total	0/11	—	0	0	0	0	0	0

== Players ==
=== Current squad ===
The following players were selected for the UEFA Futsal Euro 2026.

No.	Pos.	Player	Date of birth (age)	Club
1	GK	Michał Kałuża	22 July 1998 (age 28)	(Polish Football Association) Rekord Bielsko-Biała
22	GK	Michał Widuch	11 April 1992 (age 34)	(Polish Football Association) Piast Gliwice
2	DF	Michał Kubik	7 May 1990 (age 36)	(Polish Football Association) AZS UŚ Katowice
6	DF	Paweł Kaniewski	20 October 1995 (age 30)	(Polish Football Association) Constract Lubawa
8	DF	Sebastian Grubalski	1 November 1999 (age 26)	(Polish Football Association) Constract Lubawa
13	DF	Tomasz Kriezel (captain)	5 November 1993 (age 32)	(Polish Football Association) Piast Gliwice
15	DF	Grzegorz Haraburda	7 June 2006 (age 20)	(Polish Football Association) Rekord Bielsko-Biała
16	DF	Maciej Jankowski	5 March 1999 (age 27)	(Polish Football Association) FC Toruń
3	DF	Mateusz Madziąg	17 November 1996 (age 29)	(Polish Football Association) We-Met Futsal Club
4	FW	Piotr Skiepko	25 February 1995 (age 31)	(Polish Football Association) Jagiellonia Białystok
7	FW	Mikołaj Zastawnik	2 September 1996 (age 29)	(Polish Football Association) Rekord Bielsko-Biała
10	FW	Sebastian Leszczak	20 January 1992 (age 34)	(Polish Football Association) BSF ABJ Bochnia
14	FW	Michał Marek	4 July 1993 (age 33)	(Polish Football Association) Rekord Bielsko-Biała

=== Recent call-ups ===
The following players have also been called up to the squad within the last 12 months.

Pos.	Player	Date of birth (age)	Caps	Goals	Club	Latest call-up
GK	Krzysztof Iwanek	26 July 2000 (age 26)			(Poland) Eurobus Przemyśl	v. Netherlands, 21 October 2025
DF	Jakub Kąkol	4 August 1996 (age 29)			(Poland) KS Futsal Leszno	v. Japan, 21 December 2025
DF	Kacper Pawlus	9 August 2006 (age 19)			(Poland) Rekord Bielsko-Biała	v. Japan, 21 December 2025
DF	Jacek Dzienis	7 November 1994 (age 31)			(Poland) Jagiellonia Białystok	v. Netherlands, 21 October 2025
DF	Martin Solzi	4 May 1995 (age 31)			(Poland) Wiara Lecha Poznań	v. Netherlands, 21 October 2025
FW	Albert Betowski	29 September 2004 (age 21)			(Poland) KS Futsal Leszno	v. Netherlands, 21 October 2025
FW	Sebastian Szadurski	5 January 1998 (age 28)			(Poland) Dreman Futsal Opole Komprachcice	v. Slovakia, 15 April 2025

== Notable players ==
- Tomasz Ciastko
- Krzysztof Filipczak
- Krzysztof Jasiński
- Jarosław Kaszowski
- Krzysztof Kuchciak
- Sebastian Leszczak
- Bartosz Łeszyk
- Andrzej Szłapa
- Waldemar Sobota

== Head coaches ==
- Krzysztof Sobieski (1992)
- Andrzej Góral (1992)
- Janusz Kupcewicz (1993–1994)
- Michał Globisz (1994–1995)
- Roman Sowiński (1995–2001)
- Leszek Latacz (2001–2002)
- Marek Bęben (2002–2004)
- Stanisław Kwiatkowski (2004)
- Władysław Łach (2004)
- Mirosław Nowicki (2005)
- Tomasz Aftański (2005–2007)
- Leszek Latacz (2007–2008)
- Andrzej Bianga (2008)
- Tadeusz Wolny (2008–2009)
- Gerard Juszczak (2009)
- (Czech Republic) Vlastimil Bartosek (2009–2012)
- Klaudiusz Hirsch (2012–2013)
- (Italy) Andrea Bucciol (2013–2015)
- Andrzej Bianga (2015–2017)
- Błażej Korczyński (2017–present)

== See also ==
- Futsal in Poland
- Polish Futsal Ekstraklasa
