= Panama national futsal team =

Panama
- Nickname(s): Los Canaleros (The Canal Men); La Marea Roja (The Red Tide)
- Association: Federación Panameña de Fútbol
- Confederation: CONCACAF
- Head coach: Agustín Campuzano
- FIFA code: PAN
- FIFA ranking: 35 (24 September 2026)
Home colours	Away colours

First international
- Costa Rica 12–4 Panama (Heredia, Costa Rica; May 7, 2004)

Biggest win
- Panama 15–0 Belize (Guatemala City, Guatemala; January 27, 2016)

Biggest defeat
- Brazil 16–0 Panama (Nakhon Ratchasima, Thailand; November 12, 2012)

FIFA World Cup
- Appearances: 4 (First in 2012)
- Best result: Round of 16 (2012)

CONCACAF Futsal Championship
- Appearances: 4 (First in 2004)
- Best result: (gold) Champions (2024)

The Panama national futsal team is controlled by the Federación Panameña de Fútbol, the governing body for futsal in Panama and represents the country in international futsal competitions, such as the World Cup and the CONCACAF Championships.

== Results and fixtures ==
The following is a list of match results in the last 12 months, as well as any future matches that have been scheduled.

Legend

Win Draw Loss Fixture

=== 2026 ===
31 October 2026 2026 Copa De Naciones Futsal Final	Panama	5-1	Cuba	Managua, Nicaragua
18:00 EEST (UTC+3)	Luis Vásquez, Didier Herrera, Alexis Castillo, Ángel Sánchez y Ruman Milord.	Report	Cristian Valiente	Stadium: Polideportivo Alexis Argüello

== Competitive record ==
=== FIFA Futsal World Cup ===
FIFA Futsal World Cup Record
Year	Round	Pld	W	D	L	GS	GA
(Netherlands) 1989	Did not enter						
(Hong Kong) 1992	Did not enter						
(Spain) 1996	Did not enter						
(Guatemala) 2000	Did not enter						
(Chinese Taipei) 2004	Did not qualify						
(Brazil) 2008	Did not qualify						
(Thailand) 2012	Round of 16	4	1	0	3	14	31
(Colombia) 2016	Group stage	3	1	0	2	6	14
(Lithuania) 2020	Group stage	3	0	0	3	4	13
(Uzbekistan) 2024	Group stage	3	1	0	2	12	19
Total	4/10	13	3	0	10	36	77

=== CONCACAF Futsal Championship ===
CONCACAF Futsal Championship Record
Year	Round	Pld	W	D	L	GF	GA	Diff
(Guatemala) 1996	Did not enter							
(Costa Rica) 2000	Did not enter							
(Costa Rica) 2004	Group Stage	3	1	1	1	10	7	+3
(Guatemala) 2008	Fourth Place	5	1	2	2	13	18	-5
(Guatemala) 2012	Third Place	5	3	0	2	22	20	+2
(Costa Rica) 2016	Runners-up	5	4	0	1	24	16	+8
(Guatemala) 2021	Fourth Place	5	2	1	2	20	12	+8
(Nicaragua) 2024	Champions	6	5	0	1	24	13	+11
Total	6/8	29	16	4	9	113	86	+27

=== Futsal Confederations Cup ===
- 2009 – Did not enter
- 2013 – Did not enter
- 2014 – Did not enter

=== South American Games ===
- 2018 - 5th place
