= Leandro Simi =

Brazilian futsal player

Simi
Personal information
- Full name: Leandro Simi
- Date of birth: 29 October 1977 (age 49)
- Place of birth: São Paulo, Brazil
- Height: 1.82 m (5 ft 11 1/2 in)
- Position: Flank

Team information
- Current team: Corinthians
- Number: 11

Senior career*
Years	Team	Apps	(Gls)
1994–1997	Wimpro		
1998	Banespa		
1999	General Motors		
2000	Vasco da Gama		
2001	Corinthians		
2002	Banespa		
2003	Barueri		
2003–2004	Perugia		
2004–2007	Cartagena		
2007	Joinville		
2007	Valencia		
2008	São José		
2009	Corinthians		

International career
- Brazil
- * Club domestic league appearances and goals

Leandro Simi (born 29 October 1977) is a Brazilian futsal player who plays for Corinthians and the Brazilian national futsal team.
