= Palacio de los Deportes (Heredia) =

Coordinates: 9.999154°N 84.122131°W

Palacio de los Deportes (English language:Palace of Sports) is an indoor arena with capacity for 7,500 persons located in Heredia, Costa Rica.

The arena regularly hosts local events such as sporting events, concerts, and trade shows.

In 2004, the arena hosted the CONCACAF Futsal Championship. It was built in 1989.

Services that the Palacio de los Deportes offers:

- Gym
- Pool
- Spa
- Karate
- Soccer camp
- Concerts
- Matches

== Notable events ==
Concerts

- Disney Live! - Mickey's Magic Show
- Aerosmith
- Ricardo Arjona
- Gustavo Cerati
- Ricardo Montaner
- Ana Belén y Víctor Manuel
- Diego Torres
- Mercedes Sosa
- Bon Jovi
- Fabulosos Cadillacs
- Mägo de Oz
- Heroes del Silencio
- Joaquín Sabina
- David Bisbal
- Yuridia
- Belinda
- Café Tacuba
- Julieta Venegas
- Sin Bandera
- Kudai
- Sting
- Roxette
- Franco de Vita
- Sean Paul
- Survivor
- Camilo Sesto
- La Quinta Estación
- Todos Tus Muertos
- UB40. Year 1994.
- INXS
- Roberto Carlos
- Júlio Iglesias
- Dream Theater. Year 2012
- Evanescence. Year 2012
- José Luis Perales . Year 2012
- La Oreja de Van Gogh
- Alex Ubago
- Axe Bahia
- Enrique Bunbury

National events

- Telethon

Sport

- Hosted the CONCACAF Futsal Championship.
- Home of Ferreteria Brenes-Barva Costa Rican 1st Division Basketball Team
