= Marek Bęben =

Polish footballer

Personal information
- Full name: Marek Stanisław Bęben
- Date of birth: 28 April 1958 (age 68)
- Place of birth: Czeladź, Poland
- Height: 1.83 m (6 ft 0 in)
- Position: Goalkeeper

Senior career*
Years	Team	Apps	(Gls)
1971–1977	CKS Czeladź		
1977–1978	Górnik Piaski Czeladź		
1978	CKS Czeladź		
1978–1990	Zagłębie Sosnowiec	275	(0)
1990–1994	Górnik Zabrze	102	(0)
1994–1996	Polonia Bytom	57	(0)
1995	→ Zagłębie Sosnowiec (loan)	14	(0)
1997–1998	Zagłębie Sosnowiec	18	(0)
1998	Polonia Bytom	0	(0)
1998	Odra Wodzisław Śląski	13	(0)
2009	Niwy Brudzowice		
2009–2012	Moravia Morawica		

Managerial career
- Clearex Chorzów (futsal)
- 2002–2004: Poland (futsal)
- Sarmacja Będzin
- 2011–2018: Moravia Morawica
- 2018–2019: Spartakus Daleszyce II
- * Club domestic league appearances and goals

Marek Bęben (born 28 April 1958) is a Polish football manager and former professional player who played as a goalkeeper.
