= Julio García Mera =

Spanish futsal player

Julio
Personal information
- Full name: Julio García Mera
- Date of birth: 27 May 1972 (age 54)
- Place of birth: Madrid, Spain
- Position: Defender

Senior career*
Years	Team	Apps	(Gls)
- Valle Inclàn
- Gallardo
- Requena
1991–2007	Interviú		

International career
1996–2005	Spain		

Managerial career
- 2023: 1K FC (KL)
- * Club domestic league appearances and goals

Julio García Mera (born 27 May 1972) is a former Spanish futsal player, best known for his spell with Inter Movistar as a defender.

== Honours ==
=== Interviú ===
- 5 LNFS Champion 95-96 01-02 02-03 03-04 and 04-05
- 1 LNFS Vice-Champion 94-95
- 4 LNFS Futsal Cup Winner 95-96 00-01 03-04 and 04-05
- 3 LNFS Futsal Cup Vice-Champion 96-97 98-99 and 02-03
- 5 LNFS Super Cup Winner 90-91, 96-97 01-02 02-03 and 03-04
- 1 European Champions Cup 3rd place 96-97
- 1 UEFA Futsal Cup 03-04
- 1 "Copa Iberica" 03-04
- 1 Intercontinental Cup 05

=== Spain ===
- FIFA World Champion Guatemala 2000
- FIFA World Vice-Champion Spain 1996
- UEFA European Champion Cordoba-Spain 1996, Moscow-Russia 2001 and Czech Rep. 2005
- UEFA European Vice Champion Granada-Spain 1999
- Four Nations Cup Winner Spain 1994, Netherlands 1997
