= Futsal at the 2007 Pan American Games =

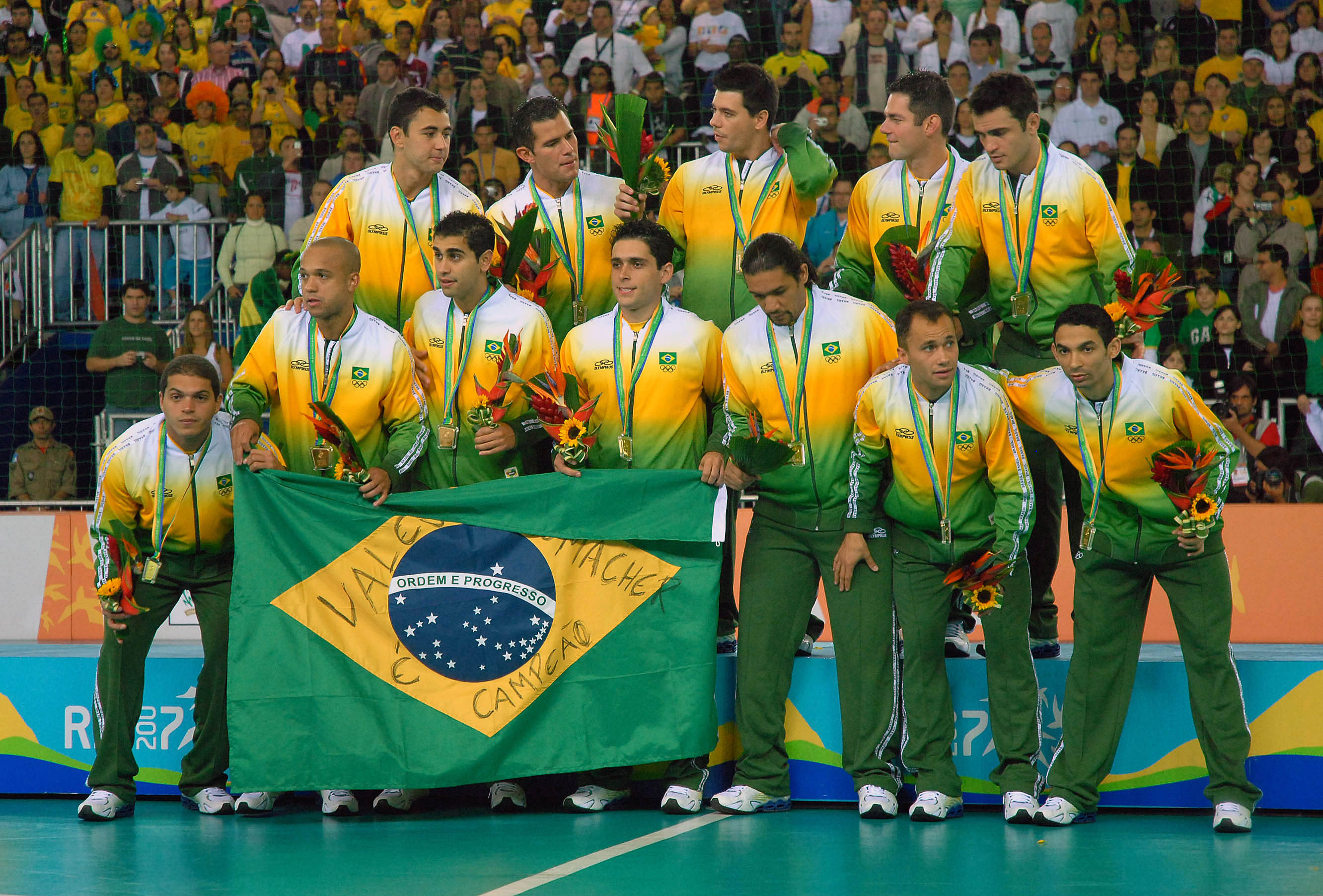
Brazil won the gold medal

Futsal at the 2007 Pan American Games took place at the Rio Centro Complex in a temporary facility. It was the first time the sport was played in a Pan American Games, due to its popularity in Brazil.

In each group, each team played against all others once and the two best teams in each group advanced to the semifinals. The teams that did not advance to the semi-finals played 5th to 8th classification matches.

== Preliminary round ==
=== Group A ===
Team	Pts	Pld	W	D	L	GF	GA	Diff
Brazil	9	3	3	0	0	14	1	+13
Paraguay	6	3	2	0	1	4	4	0
Cuba	3	3	1	0	2	5	10	–5
Guatemala	0	3	0	0	3	2	10	–8

July 23

Paraguay	2–1	Cuba

Brazil	4–1	Guatemala

July 24

Paraguay	2–1	Guatemala

Brazil	8–0	Cuba

July 25

Cuba	4–0	Guatemala

Paraguay	0–2	Brazil

=== Group B ===
Team	Pts	Pld	W	D	L	GF	GA	Diff
Argentina	7	3	2	1	0	11	3	+8
Costa Rica	4	3	1	1	1	12	11	+1
United States	4	3	1	1	1	11	13	–2
Ecuador	1	3	0	1	2	7	14	–7

July 23

Ecuador	4–6	Costa Rica

United States	2–5	Argentina

July 24

United States	3–3	Ecuador

Argentina	1–1	Costa Rica

July 25

United States	6–5	Costa Rica

Argentina	5–0	Ecuador

== Consolation round ==
5-8th place
27 July
Cuba	5
Ecuador	4
27 July
United States	4
Guatemala	3

5th place
28 July
Cuba	2 (4)
United States	2 (5)
7th place
28 July
Ecuador	3
Guatemala	8

=== Classification 5th-8th ===
July 27

Cuba	5–4	Ecuador

United States	4–3	Guatemala

=== Seventh Place ===
July 28

Guatemala	8–3	Ecuador

=== Fifth Place ===
July 28

Cuba	2–2 (4–5 PSO)	United States

== Final round ==
Semi-finals
27 July
Paraguay	1 (3)
Argentina	1 (4)
27 July
Brazil	8
Costa Rica	1

Final
28 July
Argentina	1
Brazil	4
Third place
28 July
Paraguay (a.e.t.)	6
Costa Rica	5

=== Semifinals ===
July 27

Paraguay	1–1 (3–4 PSO)	Argentina

Brazil	8–1	Costa Rica

=== Bronze Medal ===
July 28

Paraguay	4–4 6–5 AET	Costa Rica

=== Gold Medal ===
July 28

Brazil	4–1	Argentina

== Final classification ==
Place	Team
Gold medal	Brazil
Silver medal	Argentina
Bronze medal	Paraguay
4	Costa Rica
5	United States
6	Cuba
7	Guatemala
8	Ecuador

2007 Pan American Games winners

Brazil
First title
