= Cuba national futsal team =

Cuba
- Shirt badge/Association crest
- Nickname(s): Leones del Caribe (Lions of the Caribbean)
- Association: Asociación de Fútbol de Cuba
- Confederation: CONCACAF
- FIFA code: CUB
- FIFA ranking: 95 (24 September 2026)
| Home colours | Away colours |

First international
- Cuba 4–6 Costa Rica (Guatemala City, Guatemala; 31 August 1996)

Biggest win
- Saint Kitts and Nevis 0–10 Cuba (Guatemala City, Guatemala; 2 July 2012)

Biggest defeat
- Brazil 18–0 Cuba (Segovia, Spain; 27 November 1996)

FIFA World Cup
- Appearances: 6 (First in 1996)
- Best result: First Round (1996, 2000, 2004, 2008, 2016)

CONCACAF Futsal Championship
- Appearances: 6 (First in 1996)
- Best result: (silver) 2nd place (1996, 2000, 2004, 2008, 2024)

The Cuba national futsal team is controlled by the Asociación de Fútbol de Cuba, the governing body for football in Cuba and represents the country in international futsal competitions, such as the World Cup and the CONCACAF Championships. They are one of the strongest teams in CONCACAF, has been reaching second place four times at the CONCACAF Futsal Championship and played 6 FIFA Futsal World Cup editions.

== Tournaments ==
=== FIFA Futsal World Cup ===
FIFA Futsal World Cup record
| Year | Round | Pld | W | D | L | GF | GA |
|---|---|---|---|---|---|---|---|
| (Netherlands) 1989 | Did not enter | | | | | | |
| (Hong Kong) 1992 | Did not enter | | | | | | |
| (Spain) 1996 | Group stage | 3 | 0 | 0 | 3 | 4 | 31 |
| (Guatemala) 2000 | Group stage | 3 | 0 | 0 | 3 | 1 | 20 |
| (Chinese Taipei) 2004 | Group stage | 3 | 0 | 0 | 3 | 3 | 16 |
| (Brazil) 2008 | Group stage | 4 | 1 | 0 | 3 | 16 | 25 |
| (Thailand) 2012 | Did not qualify | | | | | | |
| (Colombia) 2016 | Group stage | 3 | 0 | 0 | 3 | 7 | 22 |
| (Lithuania) 2021 | Did not qualify | | | | | | |
| (Uzbekistan) 2024 | Group stage | 3 | 0 | 0 | 3 | 5 | 27 |
| Totals | 6/10 | 16 | 1 | 0 | 18 | 36 | 141 |

=== CONCACAF Futsal Championship ===
- 1996 - (silver) 2nd place
- 2000 - (silver) 2nd place
- 2004 - (silver) 2nd place
- 2008 - (silver) 2nd place
- 2012 - Group Stage (5th place)
- 2016 - Semi-Final (4th place)
- 2021 - Group Stage (12th place)
- 2024 - (silver) 2nd place

=== Futsal at the Pan American Games ===
- 2007 – 6th place
