= 2004 CONCACAF Futsal Championship =

Campeonato de Futsal de CONCACAF 2016

Tournament details
- Host country: Costa Rica
- City: Heredia
- Dates: 23 July – 1 August
- Teams: 8 (from 1 confederation)
- Venue: 1 (in 1 host city)

Final positions
- Champions: United States (2nd title)
- Runners-up: Cuba
- Third place: Costa Rica
- Fourth place: Mexico

Tournament statistics
- Matches played: 16
- Goals scored: 127 (7.94 per match)
- Attendance: 10,882 (680 per match)
- Top scorer: (Costa Rica) Jefrid Ruiz (8 goals)
- Best player: (Cuba) Juan Portal
- Best goalkeeper: (United States) Brett Phillips
- Fair play award: United States

The 2004 CONCACAF Futsal Championship was the 3rd edition of the CONCACAF Futsal Championship, the quadrennial international futsal championship organised by CONCACAF for the men's national teams of the North, Central American and Caribbean region. The tournament was held in Heredia, Costa Rica between 23 July–1 August 2004. A total of eight teams played in the tournament.

Same as previous editions, the tournament acted as the CONCACAF qualifiers for the FIFA Futsal World Cup. The top two teams of the tournament qualified for the 2004 FIFA Futsal World Championship in Chinese Taipei as the CONCACAF representatives.

== Qualification ==
Results:

Was held in Costa Rica:

=== North and Central Zone ===
United States-Honduras

Mexico-El Salvador

Panama-Canada

Date/Time Match

18/05/2004 USA Honduras 5 1

20/05/2004 Mexico Club Internacional de Futbol Sivar 10 4

20/05/2004 Honduras USA 0 2

21/05/2004 Panama Canada 4 5

22/05/2004 Canada Panama 1 7

22/05/2004 Club Internacional de Futbol Sivar Mexico 5 7

Club Internacional de Futbol Sivar = El Salvador

=== Caribbean ===
Standing : Group A - Round

1. Team PT MP W D L GF GA +/-

1 Trinidad and Tobago 9 3 3 0 0 17 7 10

2 Netherlands Antilles 6 3 2 0 1 16 9 7

3 Grenada 3 3 1 0 2 10 16 -6

4 Puerto Rico 0 3 0 0 3 6 17 -11

Group A - Round

Date/Time Match

19/04/2004 Grenada Netherlands Antiles 2 6

19/04/2004 Trinidad and Tobago Puerto Rico 4 2

20/04/2004 Puerto Rico Grenada 1 6

20/04/2004 Netherlands Antiles Trinidad and Tobago 3 4

21/04/2004 Trinidad and Tobago Grenada 9 2

21/04/2004 Puerto Rico Netherlands Antiles 3 7

Standing : Group B - Round

1. Team PT MP W D L GF GA +/-

1 Guyana 9 3 3 0 0 29 9 20

2 Suriname 6 3 2 0 1 27 8 19

3 Saint Vincent and the Grenadines 3 3 1 0 2 4 18 -14

4 Turks and Caicos Islands 0 3 0 0 3 3 28 -25

Group B - Round

Date/Time Match

19/04/2004 Suriname St. Vincent and the Grenadines 7 0

19/04/2004 Guyana Turks and Caicos Islands 11 2

20/04/2004 Turks and Caicos Islands Suriname 1 15

20/04/2004 St. Vincent and the Grenadines Guyana 2 11

21/04/2004 Suriname Guyana 5 7

21/04/2004 Turks and Caicos Islands St. Vincent and the Grenadines 0 2

3rd Place Match

Date/Time Match

23/04/2004 Suriname Netherlands Antiles 9 4

Final

Date/Time Match

23/04/2004 Trinidad and Tobago Guyana 5 0

=== Qualified teams ===
The following eight teams qualified for the final tournament.

Team	Qualification	Appearance	Previous best performances	Previous FIFA Futsal World Cup appearances
North American Zone (NAFU) qualified through North / Central American qualifying play-off
Mexico	Play-off winner	3rd	Third place (1996)	0
United States	Play-off winner	3rd	Winners (1996)	3
Central American Zone (UNCAF) qualified through North / Central American qualifying play-off
Costa Rica	Hosts	3rd	Winners (2000)	2
Panama	Play-off winner	1st	—	0
Caribbean Zone (CFU) qualified through Caribbean qualifying tournament
Trinidad and Tobago	Winners	1st	—	0
Guyana	Runners-up	1st	—	0
Suriname	Third place	2nd	Group stage (2000)	0
Cuba	Automatic	3rd	Runners-up (1996, 2000)	1

== Venues ==
The matches were played at the Palacio de los Deportes in Heredia.

== Group stage ==
The top two teams of each group advanced to the semi-finals. The semi-final winners qualified for the 2004 FIFA Futsal World Championship. The teams were ranked according to points (3 points for a win, 1 point for a draw, 0 points for a loss). If tied on points, tiebreakers would be applied in the following order:

1. Goal difference in all group matches;
2. Greatest number of goals scored in all group matches;
3. Greatest number of points obtained in the group matches between the teams concerned;
4. Goal difference resulting from the group matches between the teams concerned;
5. Greater number of goals scored in all group matches between the teams concerned;
6. Drawing of lots.

All times were local, CST (UTC−6).

=== Group A ===
Pos	Team	Pld	W	D	L	GF	GA	GD	Pts	Qualification
1	Costa Rica	3	3	0	0	23	2	+21	9	Knockout stage
2	Mexico	3	2	0	1	12	13	−1	6	Knockout stage
3	Trinidad and Tobago	3	1	0	2	12	16	−4	3	
4	Suriname	3	0	0	3	10	26	−16	0	

Source: RSSSF

23 July 2004	Mexico	6–4	Trinidad and Tobago	Heredia, Costa Rica
	Contreras 12' 24'; Montiel 14'; Olvera 22'; López 29'; Huerta 39'		6' 40' Balthazar; 16' Small; 21' James	Stadium: Palacio de los Deportes; Attendance: 100; Referee: Carlos del Cid (GUA)

23 July 2004	Costa Rica	13–1	Suriname	Heredia, Costa Rica
	Jú. Rodríguez 13' 15'; Montoya 16' 27' 37'; Carvajal 18'; Chávez 19' 38'; Ruiz 22' 24'; Jo. Rodríguez 23'; Barrantes 39' 40'		33' Feller	Stadium: Palacio de los Deportes; Attendance: 750; Referee: Terry Mashino (USA)

25 July 2004	Suriname	5–6	Mexico	Heredia, Costa Rica
	Derby 23'; Brandon 23'; Doesburg 35'; Zebeda 36'; Feller 40'		1' Contreras; 15' Ramírez; 16' Castañeda; 18' López; 29' Huerta; 35' Montiel	Stadium: Palacio de los Deportes; Attendance: 700; Referee: Antonio Álvarez (CUB)

25 July 2004	Costa Rica	6–1	Trinidad and Tobago	Heredia, Costa Rica
	Montoya 3'; Vindas 30'; Chávez 34'; Rodríguez 35'; Ruiz 36'; Arce 38'		38' Lee	Stadium: Palacio de los Deportes; Attendance: 700; Referee: Donald Campos (NCA)

27 July 2004	Trinidad and Tobago	7–4	Suriname	Heredia, Costa Rica
	Balthazar 17' 18'; Olliverra 21'; James 28'; Joseph 30'; Small 36'; Lee 38'		3' 35' 37' Brandon; 34' Zebeda	Stadium: Palacio de los Deportes; Attendance: 350; Referee: Roy McArthur (GUY)

27 July 2004	Costa Rica	4–0	Mexico	Heredia, Costa Rica
	Ruiz 10'; Carvaja 28'; Arce 30'; Barrantes 38'			Stadium: Palacio de los Deportes; Attendance: 1,980; Referee: Ricardo Díaz (PAN)

=== Group B ===
Pos	Team	Pld	W	D	L	GF	GA	GD	Pts	Qualification
1	Cuba	3	2	1	0	13	4	+9	7	Knockout stage
2	United States	3	1	2	0	9	3	+6	5	Knockout stage
3	Panama	3	1	1	1	10	7	+3	4	
4	Guyana	3	0	0	3	6	24	−18	0	

Source: RSSSF

24 July 2004	United States	2–2	Panama	Heredia, Costa Rica
	Howes 26'; Shanker 32'		20' 32' Rangel	Stadium: Palacio de los Deportes; Attendance: 103; Referee: Emilio Dongu (MEX)

24 July 2004	Guyana	3–10	Cuba	Heredia, Costa Rica
	Bentick 10'; Grant 25'; Nassy 40'		2' 33' 37' Saname; 8' 11' Díaz; 12' 36' Guerra; 13' Morales; 26' Serrano; 38' Chapman	Stadium: Palacio de los Deportes; Attendance: 103; Referee: Jorge Ruiz (CRC)

26 July 2004	United States	6–0	Guyana	Heredia, Costa Rica
	Shanker 20'; Dusosky 22' 23'; White 27' 35'; Gustaferro 28' (pen.)			Stadium: Palacio de los Deportes; Attendance: 45; Referee: Víctor Prendas (CRC)

26 July 2004	Cuba	2–0	Panama	Heredia, Costa Rica
	Serrano 18' 26'			Stadium: Palacio de los Deportes; Attendance: 95; Referee: Ernest Richardson (GRN)

28 July 2004	Panama	8–3	Guyana	Heredia, Costa Rica
	Rangel 5' 33' 35'; Williams 7'; Alvarado 25'; Smith 28' 35'; Murillo 38'		15' Douglas; 28' Hayde; 37' Waterton	Stadium: Palacio de los Deportes; Attendance: 53; Referee: Emilio Dongu (MEX)

28 July 2004	Cuba	1–1	United States	Heredia, Costa Rica
	Morales 7'		30' (pen.) Gustaferro	Stadium: Palacio de los Deportes; Attendance: 71; Referee: Jorge Ruiz (CRC)

== Knockout stage ==
In the knockout stage, extra time and penalty shoot-out would be used to decide the winner if necessary.

=== Bracket ===
Semi-finals
30 July – Heredia
Costa Rica	0
United States	4
30 July – Heredia
Cuba	5
Mexico	4

Final
1 August – Heredia
United States	2
Cuba	0
Third place
1 August – Heredia
Costa Rica	12
Mexico	5

=== Semi-finals ===
30 July 2004	Cuba	5–4	Mexico	Heredia, Costa Rica
	Morales 2'; Guerra 2'; Díaz 10' 14' (pen.) 39' (pen.)		3' Huerta; 11' Contreras; 35' Ramírez; 38' Castañeda	Stadium: Palacio de los Deportes; Attendance: 2,741; Referee: John Konstantinidis (USA)

30 July 2004	Costa Rica	0–4	United States	Heredia, Costa Rica
			9' (pen.) Gustaferro; 26' 38' Howes; 40' Shanker	Stadium: Palacio de los Deportes; Attendance: 2,741; Referee: Vladimir Goitisolo (CUB)

=== Third place playoff ===
1 August 2004	Costa Rica	12–5	Mexico	Heredia, Costa Rica
	Rodríguez 4' 11' 18'; Chávez 12' 13'; Ruiz 19' 24' 34' 35'; Montoya 21'; Vindas 33' 38'		22' López; 23' Huerta; 27' 31' Olvera; 36' Ramírez	Stadium: Palacio de los Deportes; Attendance: 175; Referee: Ricardo Díaz (PAN)

=== Final ===
1 August 2004	Cuba	0–2	United States	Heredia, Costa Rica
			20' Howes; 26' D'Ambra	Stadium: Palacio de los Deportes; Attendance: 175; Referee: Ernest Richardson (GRN)

== Winner ==
2004 CONCACAF Futsal Championship

United States
Second title

== Final ranking ==
Teams qualified for the 2004 FIFA Futsal World Championship

Rank	Team
1st place, gold medalist(s)	United States
2nd place, silver medalist(s)	Cuba
3rd place, bronze medalist(s)	Costa Rica
4	Mexico
5	Panama
6	Trinidad and Tobago
7	Suriname
8	Guyana
