= Costa Rica national futsal team =

National futsal association team

Costa Rica
- Shirt badge/Association crest
- Nickname(s): Ticos; La Sele (The Selection)
- Association: Costa Rican Football Federation
- Confederation: CONCACAF
- FIFA code: CRC
- FIFA ranking: 35 ▼3 (12 December 2025)
| Home colours | Away colours |

First international
- Costa Rica 2–6 Belgium (Hong Kong, Hong Kong; November 16, 1992)

Biggest win
- Haiti 0–13 Costa Rica (Guatemala City, Guatemala; June 4, 2008)

Biggest defeat
- Brazil 15–1 Costa Rica (Hong Kong, Hong Kong; November 19, 1992)

FIFA World Cup
- Appearances: 6 (First in 1992)
- Best result: Second Round (2016, 2024)

AMF World Cup
- Appearances: 4 (First in 1982)
- Best result: First Round (1982, 1985, 1991, 2000)

CONCACAF Futsal Championship
- Appearances: 8 (First in 1996)
- Best result: (gold) Champions (2000, 2012, 2016, and 2021)

Grand Prix de Futsal
- Appearances: 5 (First in 2009)
- Best result: 4th place (2018)

The Costa Rica national futsal team is controlled by the Costa Rican Football Federation, the governing body for futsal in Costa Rica and represents the country in international futsal competitions, such as the World Cup and the CONCACAF Championships.

== Competitive record ==
=== FIFA Futsal World Cup ===
FIFA Futsal World Cup record
| Year | Round | Pld | W | D | L | GF | GA |
|---|---|---|---|---|---|---|---|
| (Netherlands) 1989 | Did not qualify | | | | | | |
| (Hong Kong) 1992 | 1st Round | 3 | 0 | 0 | 3 | 9 | 29 |
| (Spain) 1996 | Did not qualify | | | | | | |
| (Guatemala) 2000 | 1st Round | 3 | 1 | 0 | 2 | 8 | 12 |
| (Taiwan) 2004 | Did not qualify | | | | | | |
| (Brazil) 2008 | Did not qualify | | | | | | |
| (Thailand) 2012 | Group Stage | 3 | 1 | 0 | 2 | 8 | 12 |
| (Colombia) 2016 | Round of 16 | 4 | 1 | 1 | 2 | 7 | 11 |
| (Lithuania) 2021 | Group Stage | 3 | 1 | 0 | 2 | 7 | 9 |
| (Uzbekistan) 2024 | Round of 16 | 4 | 1 | 1 | 2 | 9 | 15 |
| Totals | 6/10 | 20 | 5 | 2 | 13 | 48 | 88 |

=== CONCACAF Futsal Championship ===
CONCACAF Futsal Championship Record
| Year | Round | Pld | W | D | L | GF | GA | Diff |
|---|---|---|---|---|---|---|---|---|
| (Guatemala) 1996 | Group Stage | 2 | 1 | 0 | 1 | 7 | 8 | -1 |
| (Costa Rica) 2000 | Champions | 5 | 5 | 0 | 0 | 25 | 8 | +17 |
| (Costa Rica) 2004 | Third Place | 5 | 4 | 0 | 1 | 35 | 11 | +24 |
| (Guatemala) 2008 | Group Stage | 3 | 1 | 1 | 1 | 21 | 12 | +9 |
| (Guatemala) 2012 | Champions | 5 | 4 | 1 | 0 | 20 | 9 | +11 |
| (Costa Rica) 2016 | Champions | 5 | 5 | 0 | 0 | 26 | 6 | +20 |
| (Guatemala) 2021 | Champions | 5 | 5 | 0 | 0 | 30 | 6 | +24 |
| (Nicaragua) 2024 | Fourth Place | 6 | 4 | 1 | 1 | 21 | 14 | +7 |
| Total | 8/8 | 36 | 29 | 3 | 4 | 185 | 74 | +111 |

=== FIFUSA/AMF Futsal World Cup ===
- 1982 – 1st round
- 1985 – 1st round
- 1988 – did not enter
- 1991 – 1st round
- 1994 – did not enter
- 1997 – did not enter
- 2000 – 1st round
- 2003 – did not enter
- 2007 – did not enter
- 2011 – did not enter
- 2015 – did not enter
- 2019 – did not enter

=== Grand Prix de Futsal ===
- 2005 – did not enter
- 2006 – did not enter
- 2007 – did not enter
- 2008 – did not enter
- 2009 – 10th place
- 2010 – 12th place
- 2011 – 15th place
- 2013 – did not enter
- 2014 – 5th place
- 2015 – did not enter
- 2018 – 4th place

=== Futsal Mundialito ===
- 1994 – did not enter
- 1995 – did not enter
- 1996 – did not enter
- 1998 – did not enter
- 2001 – 1st round
- 2002 – did not enter
- 2006 – did not enter
- 2007 – did not enter
- 2008 – did not enter

=== Futsal at the Pan American Games ===
- 2007 – 4th place
