= 1992 FIFA Futsal World Championship =

1992年世界室內五人足球錦標賽

Tournament details
- Host country: Hong Kong
- Dates: 15–28 November
- Teams: 16 (from 6 confederations)
- Venues: 2 (in 1 host city)

Final positions
- Champions: Brazil (2nd title)
- Runners-up: United States
- Third place: Spain
- Fourth place: Iran

Tournament statistics
- Matches played: 40
- Goals scored: 307 (7.68 per match)
- Attendance: 50,300 (1,258 per match)
- Top scorer: (Iran) Saeid Rajabi (17 goals)
- Best player: (Brazil) Jorginho Pimentel

The 1992 FIFA Futsal World Championship was the second FIFA Futsal World Championship, the quadrennial international futsal championship contested by the men's national teams of the member associations of FIFA. It was held between 15 and 28 November 1992 in Hong Kong. It was the first FIFA tournament held in Hong Kong.

Brazil won the tournament for the second consecutive time.

== Qualifying criteria ==
=== Qualified nations ===
Competition	Date	Venue	Berths	Qualified
Host Nation			1	Hong Kong
CAF Qualification (NOT HELD) only 1 team			1	Nigeria
CONCACAF Qualification			2	United States; Costa Rica
AFC Preliminary Competition	May 1–3, 1992	Hong Kong	2	Iran; China
1992 CONMEBOL Futsal Championship	Jun 2–4, 1992	Brazil	3	Brazil; Argentina; Paraguay
1992 Oceanian Futsal Championship	Jun 15–20, 1992	Australia	1	Australia
UEFA Preliminary Competition	1992	Italy; Spain	6	Spain; Poland; Italy; Russia; Netherlands; ~~Yugoslavia~~ ^{1} Belgium
TOTAL			16	Field is Finalized

^{1} Qualified for the tournament, but was ejected due to the Yugoslav Wars.

== Venues ==
(British Hong Kong) Hong Kong
Hong Kong Coliseum	Kowloon Park Sports Center
Capacity: 10,500	Capacity: 500
1992 FIFA Futsal World Championship is located in Hong Kong

== Squads ==
Each nation submitted a squad of 12 players, including two goalkeepers.

== Officials ==
Confederation	Referees
CONMEBOL	(Brazil) Manoel Filha Serapiao
CONMEBOL	(Chile) Hernán Silva
CONMEBOL	(Paraguay) Sabino Farina Céspedes
CAF	(Egypt) Ali Hussein Mousa
CONCACAF	(Costa Rica) Jorge G. Cantillano Castro
OFC	(New Zealand) Kenneth Wallace

Confederation	Referees
AFC	(British Hong Kong) Samuel Chan Yam Ming
AFC	(Iran) Hossein Asgari
UEFA	(Portugal) Carlos Silva Valente
UEFA	(Czech Republic) Václav Krondl
UEFA	(Spain) Juan Ansuátegui Roca
UEFA	(Hungary) László Vágner

== Matches ==
The 16 teams were divided in four groups, each group with four teams.

=== First round ===
==== Group A ====
Team	Pld	W	D	L	GF	GA	GD	Pts
Argentina	3	3	0	0	11	5	+6	6
Poland	3	2	0	1	11	9	+2	4
Hong Kong	3	1	0	2	7	7	0	2
Nigeria	3	0	0	3	7	15	−8	0

15 November 1992
17:00

Poland	4–2	Hong Kong
	Report

Hong Kong Coliseum, Hung Hom
Attendance: 3,863
Referee: Hernán Silva Arce (Chile)
15 November 1992
15:00

Argentina	6–2	Nigeria
	Report

Hong Kong Coliseum, Hung Hom
Attendance: 3,863
Referee: Václav Krondl (Czechoslovakia)

18 November 1992
20:30

Argentina	2–1	Hong Kong
	Report

Hong Kong Coliseum, Hung Hom
Attendance: 3,184
Referee: Kenneth Wallace (New Zealand)
18 November 1992
18:30

Poland	5–4	Nigeria
	Report

Kowloon Park Sports Center, Tsim Sha Tsui
Attendance: 256
Referee: Juan Ansuátegui Roca (Spain)

20 November 1992
20:30

Hong Kong	4–1	Nigeria
	Report

Hong Kong Coliseum, Hung Hom
Attendance: 2,390
Referee: Manoel Serapiao Filha (Brazil)
20 November 1992
20:30

Argentina	3–2	Poland
	Report

Kowloon Park Sports Center, Tsim Sha Tsui
Attendance: 252
Referee: Carlos Silva Valente (Portugal)

==== Group B ====
Team	Pld	W	D	L	GF	GA	GD	Pts
Iran	3	2	0	1	18	13	+5	4
Netherlands	3	2	0	1	7	7	0	4
Italy	3	1	0	2	15	16	−1	2
Paraguay	3	1	0	2	14	18	−4	2

16 November 1992
18:30

Netherlands	2–1	Iran
	Report

Hong Kong Coliseum, Hung Hom
Attendance: 2,100
Referee: Manoel Serapiao Filha (Brazil)
16 November 1992
18:30

Italy	7–5	Paraguay
	Report

Kowloon Park Sports Center, Tsim Sha Tsui
Attendance: 206
Referee: Carlos Silva Valente (Portugal)

18 November 1992
18:30

Iran	7–5	Italy
	Report

Hong Kong Coliseum, Hung Hom
Attendance: 1,482
Referee: Hernán Silva Arce (Chile)
18 November 1992
20:30

Paraguay	3–1	Netherlands
	Report

Hong Kong Coliseum, Hung Hom
Attendance: 1,482
Referee: László Vágner (Hungary)

20 November 1992
18:30

Netherlands	4–3	Italy
	Report

Hong Kong Coliseum, Hung Hom
Attendance: 2,390
Referee: Václav Krondl (Czechoslovakia)
20 November 1992
18:30

Iran	10–6	Paraguay
	Report

Kowloon Park Sports Center, Tsim Sha Tsui
Attendance: 252
Referee: Juan Ansuátegui Roca (Spain)

==== Group C ====
Team	Pld	W	D	L	GF	GA	GD	Pts
Brazil	3	3	0	0	23	1	+22	6
Belgium	3	2	0	1	8	8	0	4
Australia	3	1	0	2	9	11	−2	2
Costa Rica	3	0	0	3	9	29	−20	0

16 November 1992
20:30

Brazil	3–0	Australia
	Report

Hong Kong Coliseum, Hung Hom
Attendance: 2,100
Referee: László Vágner (Hungary)
16 November 1992
20:30

Belgium	6–2	Costa Rica
	Report

Kowloon Park Sports Center, Tsim Sha Tsui
Attendance: 206
Referee: Hossein Asgari (Iran)

18 November 1992
20:30

Brazil	15–1	Costa Rica
	Report

Kowloon Park Sports Center, Tsim Sha Tsui
Attendance: 567
Referee: Václav Krondl (Czechoslovakia)
18 November 1992
18:30

Belgium	2–1	Australia
	Report

Kowloon Park Sports Center, Tsim Sha Tsui
Attendance: 567
Referee: Ali Hussein Mousa (Egypt)

20 November 1992
18:30

Australia	8–6	Costa Rica
	Report

Kowloon Park Sports Center, Tsim Sha Tsui
Attendance: 226
Referee: Samuel Chan Yam Ming (British Hong Kong)
20 November 1992
18:30

Brazil	5–0	Belgium
	Report

Hong Kong Coliseum, Hung Hom
Attendance: 1,749
Referee: Kenneth Wallace (New Zealand)

==== Group D ====
Team	Pld	W	D	L	GF	GA	GD	Pts
Spain	3	2	1	0	18	15	+3	5
United States	3	2	0	1	18	9	+9	4
Russia	3	1	1	1	20	16	+4	3
China	3	0	0	3	7	23	−16	0

17 November 1992
18:30

Spain	6–5	China
	Report

Hong Kong Coliseum, Hung Hom
Attendance: 3,184
Referee: Sabino Farina Céspedes (Paraguay)
17 November 1992
20:30

United States	8–3	Russia
	Report

Kowloon Park Sports Center, Tsim Sha Tsui
Attendance: 256
Referee: Samuel Chan Yam Ming (British Hong Kong)

19 November 1992
20:30

Russia	10–1	China
	Report

Hong Kong Coliseum, Hung Hom
Attendance: 1,245
Referee: Jorge G. Cantillano Castro (Costa Rica)
19 November 1992
18:30

Spain	5–3	United States
	Report

Hong Kong Coliseum, Hung Hom
Attendance: 1,245
Referee: Hossein Asgari (Iran)

21 November 1992
20:30

Spain	7–7	Russia
	Report

Kowloon Park Sports Center, Tsim Sha Tsui
Attendance: 226
Referee: Ali Hussein Mousa (Egypt)
21 November 1992
20:30

United States	7–1	China
	Report

Hong Kong Coliseum, Hung Hom
Attendance: 1,749
Referee: Sabino Farina Céspedes (Paraguay)

=== Second round ===
==== Group E ====
Team	Pld	W	D	L	GF	GA	GD	Pts
Brazil	3	2	1	0	13	4	+9	5
United States	3	1	2	0	11	8	+3	4
Netherlands	3	1	1	1	8	10	−2	3
Argentina	3	0	0	3	5	15	−10	0

23 November 1992
20:30

Brazil	2–2	United States
	Report

Hong Kong Coliseum, Hung Hom
Attendance: 2,769
Referee: Hossein Asgari (Iran)
23 November 1992
18:30

Netherlands	4–1	Argentina
	Report

Hong Kong Coliseum, Hung Hom
Attendance: 2,769
Referee: Kenneth Wallace (New Zealand)

24 November 1992
20:30

Brazil	5–1	Argentina
	Report

Kowloon Park Sports Center, Tsim Sha Tsui
Attendance: 328
Referee: Carlos Silva Valente (Portugal)
24 November 1992
20:30

United States	3–3	Netherlands
	Report

Kowloon Park Sports Center, Tsim Sha Tsui
Attendance: 328
Referee: Juan Ansuátegui Roca (Spain)

25 November 1992
20:30

United States	6–3	Argentina
	Report

Hong Kong Coliseum, Hung Hom
Attendance: 3,394
Referee: Juan Ansuátegui Roca (Spain)
25 November 1992
20:30

Brazil	6–1	Netherlands
	Report

Kowloon Park Sports Center, Tsim Sha Tsui
Attendance: 191
Referee: Hossein Asgari (Iran)

==== Group F ====
Team	Pld	W	D	L	GF	GA	GD	Pts
Iran	3	3	0	0	10	4	+6	6
Spain	3	2	0	1	14	10	+4	4
Belgium	3	1	0	2	9	10	−1	2
Poland	3	0	0	3	4	13	−9	0

23 November 1992
18:30

Iran	2–0	Poland
	Report

Kowloon Park Sports Center, Tsim Sha Tsui
Attendance: 148
Referee: Hernán Silva Arce (Chile)
23 November 1992
20:30

Spain	5–3	Belgium
	Report

Kowloon Park Sports Center, Tsim Sha Tsui
Attendance: 148
Referee: Sabino Farina Céspedes (Paraguay)

24 November 1992
18:30

Iran	4–2	Spain
	Report

Hong Kong Coliseum, Hung Hom
Attendance: 2,180
Referee: László Vágner (Hungary)
24 November 1992
18:30

Belgium	4–1	Poland
	Report

Hong Kong Coliseum, Hung Hom
Attendance: 2,180
Referee: Manoel Filha Serapiao (Brazil)

25 November 1992
18:30

Iran	4–2	Belgium
	Report

Hong Kong Coliseum, Hung Hom
Attendance: 3,394
Referee: Sabino Farina Céspedes (Paraguay)
25 November 1992
18:30

Spain	7–3	Poland
	Report

Kowloon Park Sports Center, Tsim Sha Tsui
Attendance: 191
Referee: Samuel Chan Yam Ming (British Hong Kong)

=== Third round ===
Semi-finals
27 November 1992
Brazil	4
Spain	1
27 November 1992
Iran	2
United States	4

Final
28 November 1992
Brazil	4
United States	1
Third place
28 November 1992
Spain	9
Iran	6

==== Semi-finals ====
27 November 1992
20:30

Brazil	4–1	Spain
	Report

Hong Kong Coliseum, Hung Hom
Attendance: 5,744
Referee: Hernán Silva Arce (Chile)
27 November 1992
18:30

Iran	2–4	United States
	Report

Hong Kong Coliseum, Hung Hom
Attendance: 5,744
Referee: Carlos da Silva Valente (Portugal)

==== Third place play-off ====
28 November 1992
18:30

Iran	6–9	Spain
	Report

Hong Kong Coliseum, Hung Hom
Attendance: 10,466
Referee: Kenneth Wallace (New Zealand)

==== Final ====
28 November 1992
20:30

Brazil	4–1	United States
	Report

Hong Kong Coliseum, Hung Hom
Attendance: 10,466
Referee: Sabino Farina Céspedes (Paraguay)

== Champions ==
FIFA Futsal World Championships 1992 winners

Brazil
Second title

== Awards ==
Golden Ball winner
(Brazil) Jorginho Pimentel
Golden Boot winner
(Iran) Saeid Rajabi
Silver Boot winner
(Russia) Konstantin Eremenko
Bronze Boot winner
(Spain) Álvaro
FIFA Fair Play Trophy
United States

== Tournament ranking ==
Per statistical convention in football, matches decided in extra time are counted as wins and losses, while matches decided by penalty shoot-out are counted as draws.

Pos	Team	Pld	W	D	L	GF	GA	GD	Pts	Final result
1	Brazil	8	7	1	0	44	7	+37	15	Champions
2	United States	8	4	2	2	34	23	+11	10	Runners-up
3	Spain	8	5	1	2	42	35	+7	11	Third place
4	Iran	8	5	0	3	36	30	+6	10	Fourth place
5	Netherlands	6	3	1	2	15	17	–2	7	Eliminated in Second round
6	Belgium	6	3	0	3	17	18	–1	6	Eliminated in Second round
7	Argentina	6	3	0	3	16	20	–4	6	Eliminated in Second round
8	Poland	6	2	0	4	15	22	–7	4	Eliminated in Second round
9	Russia	3	1	1	1	20	16	+4	3	Eliminated in First round
10	Hong Kong	3	1	0	2	7	7	0	2	Eliminated in First round
11	Italy	3	1	0	2	15	16	–1	2	Eliminated in First round
12	Australia	3	1	0	2	9	11	–2	2	Eliminated in First round
13	Paraguay	3	1	0	2	14	18	–4	2	Eliminated in First round
14	Nigeria	3	0	0	3	7	15	–8	0	Eliminated in First round
15	China	3	0	0	3	7	23	–16	0	Eliminated in First round
16	Costa Rica	3	0	0	3	9	29	–20	0	Eliminated in First round
