= 2004 FIFA Futsal World Championship =

FIFA Futsal World Championship Chinese Taipei 2004 2004年世界杯五人制足球錦標賽

Tournament details
- Host country: Taiwan
- Dates: 21 November – 5 December
- Teams: 16 (from 6 confederations)
- Venues: 2 (in 2 host cities)

Final positions
- Champions: Spain (2nd title)
- Runners-up: Italy
- Third place: Brazil
- Fourth place: Argentina

Tournament statistics
- Matches played: 40
- Goals scored: 237 (5.93 per match)
- Attendance: 50,923 (1,273 per match)
- Top scorer: (Brazil) Falcão (13 goals)
- Best player: (Brazil) Falcão

The 2004 FIFA Futsal World Championship was the fifth FIFA Futsal World Championship, the quadrennial international futsal championship contested by the men's national teams of the member associations of FIFA. It was held between 21 November and 5 December 2004 in Taiwan (designated as Chinese Taipei under FIFA). It was the first FIFA tournament held in the country and was the last to feature 16 teams.

Spain won their second successive title, defeating Italy in the final.

== Qualifying criteria ==
=== Qualified nations ===
Competition	Date	Venue	Berths	Qualified teams
Host nation			1	Chinese Taipei
2004 AFC Futsal Championship	16–25 April 2004	Macau	3	Iran; Thailand; Japan
2004 African Futsal Championship	9 July – 3 September 2004	Home & away	1	Egypt
2004 CONCACAF Futsal Championship	23 July – 1 August 2004	Costa Rica	2	United States; Cuba
2003 Copa América de Futsal	26 August – 1 September 2003	Paraguay	3	Paraguay; Argentina; Brazil
2004 Oceanian Futsal Championship	25–29 July 2004	Australia	1	Australia
UEFA preliminary competition	November – December 2003	Groups	5	Ukraine; Spain; Czech Republic; Italy; Portugal
Total			16	—

== Venues ==
Taipei	Taoyuan (Linkou)
NTU Gymnasium	NTSU Gymnasium
Capacity: 3,500	Capacity: 15,000
2004 FIFA Futsal World Championship is located in Taiwan

== First round ==
(21–26 November)

=== Group A ===
Team	Pld	W	D	L	GF	GA	GD	Pts
Spain	3	3	0	0	19	0	+19	9
Ukraine	3	2	0	1	12	8	+4	6
Egypt	3	1	0	2	16	12	+4	3
Chinese Taipei	3	0	0	3	2	29	−27	0

Chinese Taipei	0–12	Egypt
Spain	2–0	Ukraine
Chinese Taipei	0–10	Spain
Egypt	4–5	Ukraine
Ukraine	7–2	Chinese Taipei
Egypt	0–7	Spain

=== Group B ===
Team	Pld	W	D	L	GF	GA	GD	Pts
Brazil	3	3	0	0	23	2	+21	9
Czech Republic	3	2	0	1	8	5	+3	6
Thailand	3	1	0	2	5	13	−8	3
Australia	3	0	0	3	2	18	−16	0

Australia	0–10	Brazil
Czech Republic	2–1	Thailand
Australia	0–5	Czech Republic
Brazil	9–1	Thailand
Thailand	3–2	Australia
Brazil	4–1	Czech Republic

=== Group C ===
Team	Pld	W	D	L	GF	GA	GD	Pts
Italy	3	3	0	0	15	5	+10	9
United States	3	1	1	1	7	8	−1	4
Paraguay	3	1	0	2	8	11	−3	3
Japan	3	0	1	2	5	11	−6	1

Italy	6–3	United States
Japan	4–5	Paraguay
Italy	5–0	Japan
United States	3–1	Paraguay
Paraguay	2–4	Italy
United States	1–1	Japan

=== Group D ===
Team	Pld	W	D	L	GF	GA	GD	Pts
Argentina	3	3	0	0	10	1	+9	9
Portugal	3	2	0	1	9	1	+8	6
Iran	3	1	0	2	9	13	−4	3
Cuba	3	0	0	3	3	16	−13	0

Iran	0–4	Portugal
Cuba	0–3	Argentina
Iran	8–3	Cuba
Portugal	0–1	Argentina
Argentina	6–1	Iran
Portugal	5–0	Cuba

== Second round ==
(28 November – 1 December)

=== Group E ===
Team	Pts	Pld	W	D	L	GF	GA	Diff
Italy	7	3	2	1	0	6	2	+4
Spain	6	3	2	0	1	7	4	+3
Portugal	4	3	1	1	1	9	7	+2
Czech Republic	0	3	0	0	3	4	13	–9

Spain	2–0	Czech Republic
Italy	0–0	Portugal
Spain	2–3	Italy
Czech Republic	4–8	Portugal
Spain	3–1	Portugal
Czech Republic	0–3	Italy

=== Group F ===
Team	Pts	Pld	W	D	L	GF	GA	Diff
Brazil	9	3	3	0	0	16	7	+9
Argentina	4	3	1	1	1	3	3	0
Ukraine	4	3	1	1	1	4	7	–3
United States	0	3	0	0	3	7	13	–6

Brazil	6–1	Ukraine
Argentina	2–1	United States
Brazil	2–1	Argentina
Ukraine	3–1	United States
Brazil	8–5	United States
Ukraine	0–0	Argentina

== Final round ==
Semi-finals
3 December 2004 – Taipei
Brazil	2 (4)
Spain (p)	2 (5)
3 December 2004 – Taipei
Argentina	4
Italy	7

Final
5 December 2004 – Taipei
Spain	2
Italy	1
Third place
5 December 2004 – Taipei
Brazil	7
Argentina	4

=== Semi-finals ===
3 December
18:00

Brazil	2–2 (a.e.t.)	Spain
Pablo 26'; Simi 35'	Report	Andreu 23'; Marcelo 35'
Penalties
Simi (penalty scored); Euler (penalty scored); Índio (penalty missed); Falcão (penalty scored); Schumacher (penalty scored); Neto (penalty missed)	4–5	(penalty missed) Kike; (penalty scored) Torras; (penalty scored) Julio; (penalty scored) Limones; (penalty scored) Javi Rodríguez; (penalty scored) Andreu

NTU Gymnasium, Taipei City
Attendance: 3,400
Referee: Néstor Valiente (Paraguay)
3 December
20:30

Argentina	4–7	Italy
Sánchez 28'; Gimenez 34', 40+1'; Wilhelm 35'	Report	Bácaro 2', 12', 35'; Fabiano 9'; Vicentini 32'; Foglia 34'; Giustozzi 38' (o.g.)

NTU Gymnasium, Taipei City
Attendance: 3,500
Referee: Ibrahim Mohamed (Egypt)

=== Third-place match ===
5 December
14:00

Brazil	7–4	Argentina
Falcão 1', 6', 12'; Schumacher 17', 36'; Euler 18'; Índio 19'	Report	Sánchez 10', 16'; Giustozzi 29', 30'

NTU Gymnasium, Taipei City
Attendance: 3,500
Referee: Pedro Galán (Spain)

=== Final ===
5 December
16:00

Spain	2–1	Italy
Kike 24'; Marcelo 30'	Report	Zanetti 40'

NTU Gymnasium, Taipei City
Attendance: 3,500
Referee: Juan Carlos Sciancalepore (Argentina)

== Champions ==
FIFA Futsal World Championships 2004 winners

Spain
Second title

== Top goalscorers ==
The top 10 scorers from the 2004 FIFA Futsal World Cup are as follows:

Rank	Name	Country	Goals
1	Falcão	Brazil	13
2	Índio	Brazil	10
3	Marcelo	Spain	9
4	Joel Queirós	Portugal	7
4	Leandro Simi	Brazil	7
6	Abou El Komsan	Egypt	6
6	Javi Rodríguez	Spain	6
8	Johnny Torres	United States	5
8	Michal Mareš	Czech Republic	5
8	Sandro Zanetti	Italy	5

== Tournament ranking ==
Per statistical convention in football, matches decided in extra time are counted as wins and losses, while matches decided by penalty shoot-out are counted as draws.

Pos	Team	Pld	W	D	L	GF	GA	GD	Pts	Final result
1	Spain	8	6	1	1	30	7	+23	19	Champions
2	Italy	8	6	1	1	29	13	+16	19	Runners-up
3	Brazil	8	7	1	0	48	15	+33	22	Third place
4	Argentina	8	4	1	3	21	18	+3	13	Fourth place
5	Portugal	6	3	1	2	18	8	+10	10	Eliminated in Second round
6	Ukraine	6	3	1	2	16	15	+1	10	Eliminated in Second round
7	Czech Republic	6	2	0	4	12	18	–6	6	Eliminated in Second round
8	United States	6	1	1	4	14	21	–7	4	Eliminated in Second round
9	Egypt	3	1	0	2	16	12	+4	3	Eliminated in First round
10	Paraguay	3	1	0	2	8	11	–3	3	Eliminated in First round
11	Iran	3	1	0	2	9	13	–4	3	Eliminated in First round
12	Thailand	3	1	0	2	5	13	–8	3	Eliminated in First round
13	Japan	3	0	1	2	5	11	–6	1	Eliminated in First round
14	Cuba	3	0	0	3	3	16	–13	0	Eliminated in First round
15	Australia	3	0	0	3	2	18	–16	0	Eliminated in First round
16	Chinese Taipei	3	0	0	3	2	29	–27	0	Eliminated in First round

== See also ==
- List of sporting events in Taiwan
