= 2024 CONCACAF Futsal Championship =

8th edition of the CONCACAF Futsal Championship

Campeonato de Futsal de CONCACAF 2024

Tournament details
- Host country: Nicaragua
- City: Managua
- Dates: 13–20 April
- Teams: 12 (from 1 confederation)
- Venue: 1 (in 1 host city)

Final positions
- Champions: Panama (1st title)
- Runners-up: Cuba
- Third place: Guatemala
- Fourth place: Costa Rica

Tournament statistics
- Matches played: 26
- Goals scored: 206 (7.92 per match)
- Top scorer(s): (Dominican Republic) David Rondón (Guatemala) Roberto Alvarado (Guatemala) Marvin Sandoval (7 goals each)
- Best player: (Panama) Alfonso Maquensi
- Best young player: (Cuba) Kevin Rueda
- Best goalkeeper: (Panama) Jaime Peñaloza
- Fair play award: Panama

The 2024 CONCACAF Futsal Championship was the 8th edition of the CONCACAF Futsal Championship, the quadrennial international futsal championship organised by CONCACAF for the men's national teams of the North, Central American and Caribbean region. The tournament was held in Managua, Nicaragua between 13 and 20 April 2024, and was the first edition not hosted by Costa Rica or Guatemala.

Same as previous editions, the tournament acted as the CONCACAF qualifiers for the FIFA Futsal World Cup. The top four teams of the tournament qualified for the 2024 FIFA Futsal World Cup in Uzbekistan as the CONCACAF representatives.

The champions Panama, runners-up Cuba, third-placed Guatemala, and fourth-placed Costa Rica, qualified for the 2024 FIFA Futsal World Cup.

== Teams ==
On 8 December 2023, CONCACAF announced the 12 teams that will play in the tournament.

Team	Appearance	Previous best performance	Previous FIFA Futsal World Cup appearances
Canada	4th	Quarter-finalists (2021)	1 (1989)
Costa Rica (title holders)	8th	**Champions** (2000, 2012, 2016, 2021)	5 (1992, 2000, 2012, 2016, 2021)
Cuba	8th	Runners-up (1996, 2000, 2004, 2008)	5 (1996, 2000, 2004, 2008, 2016)
Dominican Republic	2nd	Quarter-finalists (2021)	
Guatemala	6th	**Champions** (2008)	5 (2000, 2008, 2012, 2016, 2021)
Haiti	5th	Group stage (2008, 2021)	
Mexico	8th	Third place (1996)	1 (2012)
Nicaragua (hosts)	3rd	Group stage (2000, 2021)	
Panama	6th	Runners-up (2016)	3 (2012, 2016, 2021)
Suriname	4th	Quarter-finalists (2021)	
Trinidad and Tobago	4th	Group stage (2004, 2008, 2021)	
United States	7th	**Champions** (1996, 2004)	6 (1989, 1992, 1996, 2004, 2008, 2021)

Bold indicates champions. Italic indicates host.

== Venue ==
The matches were played at Polideportivo Alexis Argüello in Managua, Nicaragua. The venue, built in 2019, is named after the late Nicaraguan boxer Alexis Argüello.

2024 CONCACAF Futsal Championship is located in Nicaragua	Managua
2024 CONCACAF Futsal Championship is located in Nicaragua	Polideportivo Alexis Argüello
2024 CONCACAF Futsal Championship is located in Nicaragua	Capacity: 8,000

== Draw ==
The draw for the group stage took place on 14 December 2023, 11:00 EST (UTC−5), at the CONCACAF Headquarters in Miami. Based on the CONCACAF Futsal Ranking as of 3 October 2021, the 12 teams which entered the group stage were distributed into four pots, as follows:

Pot 1	Pot 2	Pot 3	Pot 4
Costa Rica; Guatemala; Panama	United States; Cuba; Mexico	Canada; Trinidad and Tobago; Suriname	Dominican Republic; Nicaragua (Host); Haiti

The 12 teams were drawn into three groups of four teams.

== Match officials ==
The following officials were chosen for the tournament on 1 April 2024.

Referees
(Canada) Christopher Grabas	(Dominican Republic) Manuel Rosario	(Panama) Roberto López
(Costa Rica) Diego López	(Guatemala) Lester Mazariegos	(El Salvador) Jhony Garcia
(Costa Rica) Josué Molina	(Guatemala) Maynor Sanic	(El Salvador) Jorge Flores
(Cuba) Adrián Martínez	(Guyana) Colin Abel	(El Salvador) José Barrera
(Cuba) Brenda Valdez	(Mexico) Carlos Trejo	(Suriname) Anthony Terborg
(Cuba) Reinier Fis Solís	(Mexico) Jonathan Betancourt	(United States) Josh Wilkens
(Cuba) Yordanka Pouyoux	(Panama) Francisco Cedeño	(United States) Krystin Pahia
(Dominican Republic) Javier García	(Panama) Ricardo Lay	(United States) Matthew Rodman

== Squads ==
Each team must register a provisional squad list of up to 25 players, at least 3 of whom must be goalkeepers, no later than 30 days before the opening match.

Each team must register a final squad list of up to 14 players, 2 of whom must be goalkeepers, no later than 10 days before the opening match.

On 5 April 2024, CONCACAF released the final rosters.

== Group stage ==
The top two teams of each group and the two best third-placed teams advance to the quarter-finals.

Fans were able to watch all group stage matches through ConcacafGO, and YouTube.

=== Tiebreakers ===
The ranking of teams in each group is determined by points earned (three for win, one for draw). If tied on points, tiebreakers would be applied in the following order:

1. Goal difference in all group matches;
2. Goals scored in all group matches;
3. Head-to-head result between tied teams;
  1. Points in matches among the tied teams;
  2. Goal difference in matches among the tied teams;
  3. Goals scored in matches among the tied teams;
4. Fair play points in all group matches (only one deduction per player, per match):
  - One yellow card: −1 point;
  - Two yellow cards (indirect red card): −3 points;
  - Direct red card: −4 points;
  - Yellow card and direct red card: −5 points;
5. Drawing of lots.

=== Group A ===
Pos	Team	Pld	W	D	L	GF	GA	GD	Pts	Qualification
1	Costa Rica	3	3	0	0	15	6	+9	9 (Note: (Note: With the score 8–3 in favor of Costa Rica and 21 minutes and 1 seconds played, the match was abandoned as Haiti was unable to field the minimum of 3 players. Haiti started the match with a total of 10 players and substitutes, 2 of which were goalkeepers. Several Haitian players left the game due to injury, although under suspicious circumstances as there was no obvious cause in most cases. CONCACAF implied the final score will stand at 8–3 in a news release later the same day.))	Knockout stage
2	Mexico	3	2	0	1	18	11	+7	6	Knockout stage
3	Suriname	3	1	0	2	8	10	−2	3	
4	Haiti	3	0	0	3	7	21	−14	0	

Source: CONCACAF
Rules for classification: Tiebreakers
Notes:
13 April 2024
14:00

Mexico	7–3	Suriname
Soltero 3'42"; Sánchez 12'52"; M. Giorgana 13'41"; Magaña 14'30", 35'16"; E. Giorgana 27'02"; Rivera 29'59"	Report (CONCACAF)	Adams 2'49"; Donner 7'58"; Blatz 38'22"

Polideportivo Alexis Argüello, Managua
Referee: Roberto López (Panama), Javier García (Dominican Republic)
13 April 2024
16:00

Costa Rica	8–3 (Abandoned)	Haiti
Chavarria 4'40", 6'42"; León 7'32"; Vargas 13'42"; Cabalceta 15'18", 16'06"; Fonseca 19'04"; Gómez 21'01"	Report (CONCACAF)	Preval 12'29"; Voltaire 16'38"; Borgella 17'34"

Polideportivo Alexis Argüello, Managua
Referee: Reinier Fis Solís (Cuba), Lester Mazariegos (Guatemala)

14 April 2024
14:00

Suriname	1–3	Costa Rica
Sastromedjo 6'45"	Report (CONCACAF)	Rodríguez 7'43"; Salas 10'04"; Tijerino 17'54"

Polideportivo Alexis Argüello, Managua
Referee: Francisco Cedeño (Panama), Yordanka Pouyoux (Cuba)
14 April 2024
16:00

Haiti	4–9	Mexico
Borgella 2'54", 4'00"; Preval 5'55"; St Hubert 12'47"	Report (CONCACAF)	Soltero 0'59"; E. Giorgana 7'25", 34'30"; Dávalos 7'54", 29'52"; Sánchez 12'25", 26'42"; Atri 20'55"; M. Giorgana 35'12"

Polideportivo Alexis Argüello, Managua
Referee: Adrián Martínez (Cuba), Maynor Sanic (Guatemala)

15 April 2024
14:00

Suriname	4–0	Haiti
Doesburg 8'22"; Adams 19'52"; Sastromedjo 33'36", 35'00"	Report (CONCACAF)

Polideportivo Alexis Argüello, Managua
Referee: Christopher Grabas (Canada), Krystin Pahia (United States)
15 April 2024
16:00

Costa Rica	4–2	Mexico
Gamboa 12'34"; Gómez 21'15"; Vindas 26'19"; Cabalceta 29'02"	Report (CONCACAF)	E. Giorgana 10'44"; Soltero 26'56"

Polideportivo Alexis Argüello, Managua
Referee: Josh Wilkens (United States), Ricardo Lay (Panama)

=== Group B ===
Pos	Team	Pld	W	D	L	GF	GA	GD	Pts	Qualification
1	Panama	3	2	0	1	15	9	+6	6	Knockout stage
2	Cuba	3	1	2	0	10	9	+1	5	Knockout stage
3	Canada	3	1	1	1	14	15	−1	4	Knockout stage
4	Nicaragua (H)	3	0	1	2	8	14	−6	1	

Source: CONCACAF
Rules for classification: Tiebreakers
(H) Hosts
13 April 2024
18:00

Cuba	5–5	Canada
Martínez 6'14", 24'54"; Hernández 6'55"; Álvarez 7'36"; González 30'20"	Report (CONCACAF)	Mlah 14'22", 31'07"; El Harchali 16'21"; Kwemi 24'34", 35'53"

Polideportivo Alexis Argüello, Managua
Referee: Josh Wilkens (United States), Manuel Rosario (Dominican Republic)
13 April 2024
20:00

Panama	6–3	Nicaragua
Milord 2'50"; Goodridge 12'40"; Ortiz 22'48", 35'37"; Hinks 24'40"; Escobar 33'02"	Report (CONCACAF)	Sequeira 21'39"; Kripp 28'00"; Ruiz 35'22"

Polideportivo Alexis Argüello, Managua
Referee: José Barrera (El Salvador), Matthew Rodman (United States)

14 April 2024
18:00

Canada	3–7	Panama
Kwemi 7'39", 20'18" (pen.), 34'15"	Report (CONCACAF)	Maquensi 4'39", 12'11"; Ortiz 5'13", 24'56"; Campos 30'17"; Goodridge 36'14"; Peñaloza 16'41"

Polideportivo Alexis Argüello, Managua
Referee: Diego López (Costa Rica), Lester Mazariegos (Guatemala)
14 April 2024
20:00

Nicaragua	2–2	Cuba
Kripp 25'25", 29'33" (pen.)	Report (CONCACAF)	González 8'40"; Morales 18'49"

Polideportivo Alexis Argüello, Managua
Referee: Jhony García (El Salvador), Carlos Trejo (Mexico)

15 April 2024
18:00

Panama	2–3	Cuba
Ortiz 32'03"; Campos 38'24"	Report (CONCACAF)	Hernández 17'15", 20'56", 38'39"

Polideportivo Alexis Argüello, Managua
Referee: José Barrera (El Salvador), Josué Molina (Costa Rica)
15 April 2024
20:00

Canada	6–3	Nicaragua
Diaz 05'07" (o.g.); Nboucha 12'32", 17'41"; Chamale 23'06"; Kwemi 30'36"; El Harchali 33'54"	Report (CONCACAF)	Sequeira 10'46", 17'07"; Ruiz 29'09"

Polideportivo Alexis Argüello, Managua
Referee: Diego López (Costa Rica), Jorge Flores (El Salvador)

=== Group C ===
Pos	Team	Pld	W	D	L	GF	GA	GD	Pts	Qualification
1	Guatemala	3	2	1	0	15	11	+4	7	Knockout stage
2	Dominican Republic	3	2	0	1	23	14	+9	6	Knockout stage
3	United States	3	1	1	1	16	14	+2	4	Knockout stage
4	Trinidad and Tobago	3	0	0	3	8	23	−15	0	

Source: CONCACAF
Rules for classification: Tiebreakers
13 April 2024
10:00

United States	7–4	Trinidad and Tobago
Ortiz 8'11", 19'55"; De Andrade 9'46", 34'46"; Burato 22'35"; Lopez 31'54"; Tayou 33'24"	Report (CONCACAF)	Ollivierra 1'49", 22'09"; Benny 24'13" (pen.); Woo Ling 36'00"

Polideportivo Alexis Argüello, Managua
Referee: Ricardo Lay (Panama), Jonathan Betancourt (Mexico)
13 April 2024
12:00

Guatemala	7–5	Dominican Republic
Alvarado 4'05", 21'51", 25'20"; Aguilar 21'25"; Campaignac 27'59"; Sandoval 33'44"; Ruiz 35'11"	Report (CONCACAF)	Gómez 13'14"; D. Rondón 15'57", 20'48"; López 24'27"; Gardelli 39'29"

Polideportivo Alexis Argüello, Managua
Referee: Adrián Martínez (Cuba), Josué Molina (Costa Rica)

14 April 2024
10:00

Trinidad and Tobago	3–5	Guatemala
Benny 6'35", 28'46"; Hospedales 15'52"	Report (CONCACAF)	B. Santizo 21'52"; Aguilar 25'11"; Alvarado 26'20"; Sandoval 27'48"; Ruiz 34'59"

Polideportivo Alexis Argüello, Managua
Referee: Reinier Fis Solís (Cuba), Christopher Grabas (Canada)
14 April 2024
12:00

Dominican Republic	7–6	United States
D. Rondón 2'40"; Belliard 4'30"; Pepén 14'11"; López 25'29"; Cestero 30'18"; H. Pérez 31'27", 39'29"	Report (CONCACAF)	Mendez 5'11", 33'37", 35'44"; Gonzalez 19'55"; Tayou 33'10"; De Andrade 39'39"

Polideportivo Alexis Argüello, Managua
Referee: Jorge Flores (El Salvador), Colin Abel (Guyana)

15 April 2024
10:00

Trinidad and Tobago	1–11	Dominican Republic
Neptune 28'32"	Report (CONCACAF)	D. Rondón 9'42", 22'07", 30'07", 38'19"; Belliard 12'40", 24'09"; Gómez 13'56"; H. Pérez 28'09"; López 32'31"; Álvarez 34'01"; Gardelli 39'07"

Polideportivo Alexis Argüello, Managua
Referee: Brenda Valdez (Cuba), Anthony Terborg (Suriname)
15 April 2024
12:00

Guatemala	3–3	United States
Sandoval 30'31", 32'04"; Ruiz 37'43"	Report (CONCACAF)	Gonzalez 13'38"; De Andrade 20'00"; Tayou 20'37"

Polideportivo Alexis Argüello, Managua
Referee: Roberto López (Panama), Jhony García (El Salvador)

=== Ranking of third-placed teams ===
The 2 best third-placed teams advance to the knockout stage along with the three group winners and three runners-up.

Pos	Grp	Team	Pld	W	D	L	GF	GA	GD	Pts	Qualification
1	C	United States	3	1	1	1	16	14	+2	4	Knockout stage
2	B	Canada	3	1	1	1	14	15	−1	4	Knockout stage
3	A	Suriname	3	1	0	2	8	10	−2	3	

Source: CONCACAF
Rules for classification: 1) Points; 2) Goal difference; 3) Goals scored; 4) Fair play points; 5) Drawing of lots.

== Knockout stage ==
In the knockout stage, extra time and penalty shoot-out are used to decide the winner if necessary.

=== Bracket ===
Quarter-finals
17 April
Costa Rica	3
Canada	2
17 April
Dominican Republic	1
Cuba	2
17 April
Panama	2
United States	1
17 April
Guatemala	9
Mexico	4

Semi-finals
18 April
Costa Rica	3 (6)
Cuba (p)	3 (7)
18 April
Panama (a.e.t.)	6
Guatemala	3

Final
20 April
Cuba	3
Panama	4
Third place match
20 April
Costa Rica	0
Guatemala	3

=== Quarter-finals ===
Winners qualify for 2024 FIFA Futsal World Cup.

17 April 2024
12:00

Costa Rica	3–2	Canada
Cabalceta 7'49"; Tijerino 8'59"; Vindas 16'15"	Report (CONCACAF)	Rose 4'35"; El Harchali 28'29"

Polideportivo Alexis Argüello, Managua
Referee: Roberto López (Panama), Josh Wilkens (United States)
17 April 2024
14:00

Panama	2–1	United States
Hinks 12'42"; Milord 14'41"	Report (CONCACAF)	De Andrade 38'50"

Polideportivo Alexis Argüello, Managua
Referee: Diego López (Costa Rica), Reiner Fis Solís (Cuba)
17 April 2024
16:00

Guatemala	9–4	Mexico
Alvarado 3'47", 8'21", 24'33"; Sandoval 11'08", 33'58"; Díaz 13'08"; E. Santizo 24'53"; Marín 30'49"; Paniagua 35'21"	Report (CONCACAF)	Sánchez 3'37"; E. Giorgana 5'10"; M. Giorgana 5'18"; Dávalos 40'00"

Polideportivo Alexis Argüello, Managua
Referee: Adrián Martínez (Cuba), José Barrera (El Salvador)
17 April 2024
18:00

Dominican Republic	1–2	Cuba
Pepen 17'21"	Report (CONCACAF)	Hernández 1'24"; Ramírez 16'06"

Polideportivo Alexis Argüello, Managua
Referee: Ricardo Lay (Panama), Jorge Flores (El Salvador)

=== Semi-finals ===
18 April 2024
18:00

Costa Rica	3–3 (a.e.t.)	Cuba
Rodriguez 14'43"; Fonseca 33'37"; Tijerino 35'32"	Report (CONCACAF)	Morales 24'28"; Cotilla 31'43"; Aguilera 38'02"
Penalties
Rodriguez (penalty scored); Leon (penalty scored); Vindas (penalty scored); Salas (penalty missed); Tijerino (penalty scored); Fonseca (penalty scored); Ortega (penalty scored); Gomez (penalty missed)	6–7	(penalty missed) Martinez; (penalty scored) Hernández; (penalty scored) Valiente; (penalty scored) Cotilla; (penalty scored) Ramirez; (penalty scored) Gonzalez; (penalty scored) Aguilera; (penalty scored) Morales

Polideportivo Alexis Argüello, Managua
Referee: Matthew Rodman (United States), Maynor Sanic (Guatemala)
18 April 2024
20:00

Panama	6–3 (a.e.t.)	Guatemala
Campos 1'44"; Maquensi 4'07"; Milord 22'53", 46'53"; Castrellon 44'59"; Ortiz 49'48"	Report (CONCACAF)	Ruiz 3'48"; Diaz 10'55"; Campaignac 18'55"

Polideportivo Alexis Argüello, Managua
Referee: Christopher Grabas (Canada), Manuel Rosario (Dominican Republic)

=== Third place match ===
20 April 2024
18:00

Costa Rica	0–3	Guatemala
	Report (CONCACAF)	E. Santizo 0'38"; Sandoval 4'58"; Díaz 30'15"

Polideportivo Alexis Argüello, Managua
Referee: Ricardo Lay (Panama), Brenda Valdez (Cuba)

=== Final ===
20 April 2024
20:00

Cuba	3–4	Panama
Martínez 19'02", 36'39"; Maquensi 20'17" (o.g.)	Report (CONCACAF)	Milord 13'43"; Campos 21'33"; Goodridge 24'17", 34'15"

Polideportivo Alexis Argüello, Managua
Referee: Josh Wilkens (United States), Diego López (Costa Rica)

== Goalscorers ==
There were 206 goals scored in 26 matches, for an average of 7.92 goals per match.

7 goals

- (Dominican Republic) David Rondón
- (Guatemala) Roberto Alvarado
- (Guatemala) Marvin Sandoval

6 goals

- (Canada) Loic Kwemi
- (Panama) Abdiel Ortiz

5 goals

- (Cuba) Jonathan Hernández
- (Mexico) Eder Giorgana
- (United States) Nilton De Andrade
- (Panama) Ruman Milord

4 goals

- (Costa Rica) Minor Cabalceta
- (Cuba) Iduan Martínez
- (Guatemala) Patrick Ruiz
- (Mexico) Eddie Sánchez
- (Panama) Aquiles Campos
- (Panama) Claudio Goodridge

3 goals

- (Canada) Montacer El Harchali
- (Costa Rica) Milinton Tijerino
- (Dominican Republic) José Belliard
- (Dominican Republic) Héctor Pérez
- (Dominican Republic) Guillermo López
- (Guatemala) Jhonny Díaz
- (Haiti) Brhorhado Borgella
- (Mexico) Daniel Soltero
- (Mexico) Miguel Giorgana
- (Mexico) Eduardo Dávalos
- (Nicaragua) Lester Kripp
- (Nicaragua) Exequiel Sequeira
- (Panama) Alfonso Maquensi
- (Suriname) Vangellino Sastromedjo
- (Trinidad and Tobago) Che Benny
- (United States) Sebastian Mendez
- (United States) Franck Tayou

2 goals

- (Canada) Safwane Mlah
- (Canada) Abdelmouhaimen Nboucha
- (Costa Rica) Diego Chavarria
- (Costa Rica) Daniel Gómez
- (Costa Rica) Gilberth Vindas
- (Costa Rica) Pablo Rodríguez
- (Costa Rica) Víctor Fonseca
- (Cuba) Jorge González
- (Cuba) José Morales
- (Dominican Republic) Marco Gómez
- (Dominican Republic) Christian Gardelli
- (Dominican Republic) Javier Pepén
- (Guatemala) Alan Aguilar
- (Guatemala) Fernando Campaignac
- (Guatemala) Edgar Santizo
- (Haiti) John Preval
- (Mexico) Luis Magaña
- (Nicaragua) Wesly Ruiz
- (Panama) Óscar Hinks
- (Suriname) Ike Adams
- (Trinidad and Tobago) Darius Ollivierra
- (United States) David Ortiz
- (United States) Luciano Gonzalez

1 goal

- (Canada) Daniel Chamale
- (Canada) Raheem Rose
- (Costa Rica) Yosel León
- (Costa Rica) César Vargas
- (Costa Rica) Jean Salas
- (Costa Rica) Enmanuel Gamboa
- (Cuba) Bárbaro Álvarez
- (Cuba) Diego Ramírez
- (Cuba) Dayan Cotilla
- (Cuba) Harold Aguilera
- (Dominican Republic) Ricardo Álvarez
- (Dominican Republic) Marselle Cestero
- (Guatemala) Bryan Santizo
- (Guatemala) José Marín
- (Guatemala) Jenner Paniagua
- (Haiti) Jean Schwetzer St Hubert
- (Haiti) Christo-Fils Voltaire
- (Mexico) Carlos Rivera
- (Mexico) Abraham Atri
- (Panama) Abdiel Escobar
- (Panama) Abdiel Castrellon
- (Panama) Jaime Peñaloza
- (Suriname) Lorenzo Donner
- (Suriname) Giovanni Blatz
- (Suriname) Nazario Doesburg
- (Trinidad and Tobago) Shane Hospedales
- (Trinidad and Tobago) Matthew Woo Ling
- (Trinidad and Tobago) Jameel Neptune
- (United States) Diego Burato
- (United States) Nicholas Lopez

1 own goal

- (Nicaragua) Roberto Díaz (against Canada)
- (Panama) Alfonso Maquensi (against Cuba)

== Qualified teams for FIFA Futsal World Cup ==
The following four teams from CONCACAF qualified for the 2024 FIFA Futsal World Cup on 17 April 2024.

Team	Qualified on	Previous appearances in FIFA Futsal World Cup
Costa Rica	17 April 2024	5 (1992, 2000, 2012, 2016, 2021)
Panama	17 April 2024	3 (2012, 2016, 2021)
Guatemala	17 April 2024	5 (2000, 2008, 2012, 2016, 2021)
Cuba	17 April 2024	5 (1996, 2000, 2004, 2008, 2016)

Italic indicates host.

== Ranking ==
Pos	Team	Pld	W	D	L	GF	GA	GD	Pts	Final result
1	Panama	6	5	0	1	24	13	+11	15	Champions
2	Cuba	6	2	3	1	15	14	+1	9	Runners-up
3	Guatemala	6	4	1	1	30	21	+9	13	Third place
4	Costa Rica	6	4	1	1	21	14	+7	13	Fourth place
5	Dominican Republic	4	2	0	2	24	16	+8	6	Eliminated in quarter-finals
6	Mexico	4	2	0	2	22	20	+2	6	Eliminated in quarter-finals
7	United States	4	1	1	2	17	16	+1	4	Eliminated in quarter-finals
8	Canada	4	1	1	2	16	18	−2	4	Eliminated in quarter-finals
9	Suriname	3	1	0	2	8	10	−2	3	Eliminated in group stage
10	Nicaragua	3	0	1	2	8	14	−6	1	Eliminated in group stage
11	Haiti	3	0	0	3	7	21	−14	0	Eliminated in group stage
12	Trinidad and Tobago	3	0	0	3	8	23	−15	0	Eliminated in group stage

Source: CONCACAF
- Note: Costa Rica 8–3 Haiti (Abandoned)

== Awards ==
The following awards were given at the conclusion of the tournament:

- Best Player Award: (Panama) Alfonso Maquensi
- Young Player Award: (Cuba) Kevin Rueda
- Top Scorer Award: (Guatemala) Marvin Sandoval
- Best Goalkeeper Award: (Panama) Jaime Peñaloza
- Fair Play Award: Panama
