= 2024 FIFA Futsal World Cup qualification =

The 2024 FIFA Futsal World Cup qualification decided who qualified for the 2024 FIFA Futsal World Cup in Uzbekistan. Qualifying occurred between April 2022 and April 2024.

== Qualified teams ==
Team qualified Team failed to qualify Team suspended Did not enter Not a FIFA member.

Confederation	Qualified through	Team	Date of qualification	Appearance	First appearance	Last appearance	Current consecutive appearances	Previous best performance
AFC (Asia) (Hosts + 4 teams)	Host nation	Uzbekistan	23 June 2023	3rd	2016	2021	3	Round of 16 (2021)
AFC (Asia) (Hosts + 4 teams)	Play off winner at the 2024 AFC Futsal Asian Cup	Afghanistan	28 April 2024	1st	N/A	N/A	1	Debut
AFC (Asia) (Hosts + 4 teams)	Semifinalists at the 2024 AFC Futsal Asian Cup	Iran	24 April 2024	9th	1992	2021	9	Third place (2016)
AFC (Asia) (Hosts + 4 teams)	Semifinalists at the 2024 AFC Futsal Asian Cup	Tajikistan	24 April 2024	1st	N/A	N/A	1	Debut
AFC (Asia) (Hosts + 4 teams)	Semifinalists at the 2024 AFC Futsal Asian Cup	Thailand	24 April 2024	7th	2000	2021	7	Round of 16 (2012, 2016, 2021)
CAF (Africa) (3 teams)	Top three at the 2024 Futsal Africa Cup of Nations	Angola	19 April 2024	2nd	2021	2021	1	Group stage (2021)
CAF (Africa) (3 teams)	Top three at the 2024 Futsal Africa Cup of Nations	Libya	21 April 2024	3rd	2008	2012	1	Group stage (2008, 2012)
CAF (Africa) (3 teams)	Top three at the 2024 Futsal Africa Cup of Nations	Morocco	19 April 2024	4th	2012	2021	4	Quarter-finals (2021)
CONCACAF (Central, North America and Caribbean) (4 teams)	Semifinalists at the 2024 CONCACAF Futsal Championship	Costa Rica	17 April 2024	6th	1992	2021	4	Round of 16 (2016)
CONCACAF (Central, North America and Caribbean) (4 teams)	Semifinalists at the 2024 CONCACAF Futsal Championship	Cuba	17 April 2024	6th	1996	2016	1	Group stage (1996, 2000, 2004, 2008, 2016)
CONCACAF (Central, North America and Caribbean) (4 teams)	Semifinalists at the 2024 CONCACAF Futsal Championship	Guatemala	17 April 2024	6th	2000	2021	5	Group stage (2000, 2008, 2012, 2016, 2021)
CONCACAF (Central, North America and Caribbean) (4 teams)	Semifinalists at the 2024 CONCACAF Futsal Championship	Panama	17 April 2024	4th	2012	2021	4	Round of 16 (2012)
CONMEBOL (South America) (4 teams)	Semifinalists at the 2024 Copa América de Futsal	Argentina	6 February 2024	10th	1989	2021	10	Champions (2016)
CONMEBOL (South America) (4 teams)	Semifinalists at the 2024 Copa América de Futsal	Brazil	6 February 2024	10th	1989	2021	10	Champions (1989, 1992, 1996, 2008, 2012)
CONMEBOL (South America) (4 teams)	Semifinalists at the 2024 Copa América de Futsal	Paraguay	7 February 2024	8th	1989	2021	6	Quarter-finals (2016)
CONMEBOL (South America) (4 teams)	Semifinalists at the 2024 Copa América de Futsal	Venezuela	7 February 2024	2nd	2021	2021	2	Round of 16 (2021)
OFC (Oceania) (1 team)	Winner of the 2023 OFC Futsal Nations Cup	New Zealand	7 October 2023	1st	N/A	N/A	1	Debut
UEFA (Europe) (7 teams)	Play off winner in Elite round	Croatia	16 April 2024	2nd	2000	2000	1	Fifth place (2000)
UEFA (Europe) (7 teams)	Elite Round Group C Winner	France	14 December 2023	1st	N/A	N/A	1	Debut
UEFA (Europe) (7 teams)	Elite Round Group A Winner	Kazakhstan	14 December 2023	4th	2000	2021	2	Fourth place (2021)
UEFA (Europe) (7 teams)	Play off winner in Elite round	Netherlands	17 April 2024	5th	1989	2000	1	Runners-up (1989)
UEFA (Europe) (7 teams)	Elite Round Group E Winner	Portugal	15 December 2023	7th	2000	2021	7	Champions (2021)
UEFA (Europe) (7 teams)	Elite Round Group D Winner	Spain	15 December 2023	10th	1989	2021	10	Champions (2000, 2004)
UEFA (Europe) (7 teams)	Elite Round Group B Winner	Ukraine	20 December 2023	6th	1996	2016	1	Fourth place (1996)

== Slot allocation ==
The slot allocation is as follows:

- AFC (Asia): 5 slots (including host Uzbekistan)
- CAF (Africa): 3 slots
- CONCACAF (Central, North America and Caribbean): 4 slots
- CONMEBOL (South America): 4 slots
- OFC (Oceania): 1 slot
- UEFA (Europe): 7 slots

== Summary ==
=== Summary of qualification process ===
Confederation	Teams started	Teams qualified	Teams eliminated	Percentage of entered teams with spots in finals	Qualifying start date	Qualifying end date
AFC (hosts)	30	5	25	16.667%	7 October 2023	28 April 2024
CAF	13	3	10	23.077%	2 February 2024	21 April 2024
CONCACAF	12	4	8	33%	13 April 2024	20 April 2024
CONMEBOL	10	4	6	40%	2 February 2024	10 February 2024
OFC	8	1	7	12.5%	1 October 2023	7 October 2023
UEFA	48	7	41	14.583%	5 April 2022	17 April 2024
Total	121	24	97	19.83%	5 April 2022	28 April 2024

== Confederation qualification ==
=== AFC ===
The four best teams not already qualified from the 2024 AFC Futsal Asian Cup in Thailand qualified for the 2024 FIFA Futsal World Cup.

Group A

Pos	Team	Pld	Pts
1	Thailand (H)	3	9
2	Vietnam	3	4
3	Myanmar	3	4
4	China	3	0

Source: AFC
(H) Hosts
Group B

Pos	Team	Pld	Pts
1	Uzbekistan	3	9
2	Iraq	3	6
3	Saudi Arabia	3	3
4	Australia	3	0

Source: AFC

Group C

Pos	Team	Pld	Pts
1	Tajikistan	3	5
2	Kyrgyzstan	3	5
3	Japan	3	4
4	South Korea	3	1

Source: AFC
Group D

Pos	Team	Pld	Pts
1	Iran	3	9
2	Afghanistan	3	4
3	Kuwait	3	4
4	Bahrain	3	0

Source: AFC

==== Knockout stage ====
Quarter-finals
24 April – Indoor Stadium Huamark
Thailand	3
Iraq	2
24 April – Indoor Stadium Huamark
Tajikistan (a.e.t.)	2
Afghanistan	1
24 April – Bangkok Arena
Uzbekistan	2
Vietnam	1
24 April – Bangkok Arena
Iran	6
Kyrgyzstan	1

Semi-finals
26 April – Indoor Stadium Huamark
Thailand (p)	3 (6)
Tajikistan	3 (5)
26 April – Bangkok Arena
Uzbekistan	3 (4)
Iran (p)	3 (5)

Final
28 April – Bangkok Arena
Thailand	1
Iran	4
Third place play-off
28 April – Bangkok Arena
Tajikistan	5 (1)
Uzbekistan (p)	5 (3)

==== Play offs ====
To decide the fifth qualifier, the four losing quarterfinalists all played in a bracket to decide the spot.

Play-off 1 and 2
26 April – Indoor Stadium Huamark
Iraq	3
Afghanistan	5
26 April – Bangkok Arena
Vietnam	2
Kyrgyzstan	3

Play-off 3
28 April – Bangkok Arena
Afghanistan	5
Kyrgyzstan	3

=== CAF ===
The top three from the 2024 Futsal Africa Cup of Nations in Morocco qualified for the 2024 FIFA Futsal World Cup.

Group A

Pos	Team	Pld	Pts
1	Morocco (H)	3	9
2	Angola	3	6
3	Zambia	3	3
4	Ghana	3	0

Source: CAF
(H) Hosts
Group B

Pos	Team	Pld	Pts
1	Egypt	3	9
2	Libya	3	6
3	Mauritania	3	3
4	Namibia	3	0

Source: CAF

==== Knockout stage ====
Semi-finals
19 April
Morocco	6
Libya	0
19 April
Egypt	3
Angola	7

Final
21 April
Morocco	5
Angola	1
Third place match
21 April
Libya (p)	2 (3)
Egypt	2 (1)

=== CONCACAF ===
The four semifinalists from the 2024 CONCACAF Futsal Championship in Nicaragua qualified for the 2024 FIFA Futsal World Cup.

Group A

Pos	Team	Pld	Pts
1	Costa Rica	3	9
2	Mexico	3	6
3	Suriname	3	3
4	Haiti	3	0

Source: CONCACAF
Group B

Pos	Team	Pld	Pts
1	Panama	3	6
2	Cuba	3	5
3	Canada	3	4
4	Nicaragua (H)	3	1

Source: CONCACAF
(H) Hosts
Group C

Pos	Team	Pld	Pts
1	Guatemala	3	7
2	Dominican Republic	3	6
3	United States	3	4
4	Trinidad and Tobago	3	0

Source: CONCACAF

==== Bracket ====
Quarter-finals
17 April
Costa Rica	3
Canada	2
17 April
Dominican Republic	1
Cuba	2
17 April
Panama	2
United States	1
17 April
Guatemala	9
Mexico	4

Semi-finals
18 April
Costa Rica	3 (6)
Cuba (p)	3 (7)
18 April
Panama (a.e.t.)	6
Guatemala	3

Final
20 April
Cuba	3
Panama	4
Third place match
20 April
Costa Rica	0
Guatemala	3

=== CONMEBOL ===
The four semifinalists from the 2024 Copa América de Futsal in Paraguay qualified for the 2024 FIFA Futsal World Cup.

Group A

Pos	Team	Pld	Pts
1	Paraguay (H)	4	8
2	Venezuela	4	7
3	Chile	4	7
4	Colombia	4	6
5	Ecuador	4	0

Source: CONMEBOL
(H) Hosts
Group B

Pos	Team	Pld	Pts
1	Brazil	4	12
2	Argentina	4	9
3	Uruguay	4	6
4	Peru	4	3
5	Bolivia	4	0

Source: CONMEBOL

==== Knockout stage ====
Semi-finals
9 February
Paraguay	0
Argentina	1
9 February
Brazil	3
Venezuela	0

Final
10 February
Argentina	0
Brazil	2
Third place play-off
10 February
Paraguay	1
Venezuela	4

=== OFC ===
The winner the 2023 OFC Futsal Nations Cup in New Zealand qualified for the 2024 FIFA Futsal World Cup.

Group A

Pos	Team	Pld	Pts
1	New Zealand (H)	3	9
2	Fiji	3	6
3	Vanuatu	3	3
4	Tonga	3	0

Source: OFC
(H) Hosts
Group B

Pos	Team	Pld	Pts
1	Tahiti	3	7
2	Solomon Islands	3	5
3	New Caledonia	3	4
4	Samoa	3	0

Source: OFC

==== Bracket (1st–4th place) ====
Semi-finals
5 October - Auckland
New Zealand	4
Solomon Islands	2
5 October - Auckland
Tahiti	7
Fiji	3

Final
7 October - Auckland
New Zealand	5
Tahiti	0
Third place match
7 October - Auckland
Solomon Islands	5
Fiji	3

=== UEFA ===
Unlike other regions, UEFA organises a separate qualification process to decide the seven qualifiers.

=== Format ===
The qualifying competition consists of five stages:

- Preliminary round: The lowest-ranked 24 teams play in the preliminary round, and are drawn into six groups of four teams. The winners and runners-up of each group advance to the main round to join the 24 highest-ranked teams which receive byes to the main round.
- Main round: The 36 teams are drawn into twelve groups of three. The 12 winners and four best runners-up progress directly to the elite round. The remaining eight runners-up enter main round play-offs.
- Main round play-offs: The eight teams are drawn into four ties, to be played home and away. The four winners of the ties complete the elite round line-up.
- Elite round: The 20 teams are drawn into five groups of four. The winners of each group qualify directly for the World Cup, while the four best runners-up advance to the play-offs.
- Elite round play-offs: The four teams are drawn into two ties to play home-and-away two-legged matches to determine the last two European qualified teams. If only two teams enter, a draw will be held to determine the order of matches.

In the preliminary round each group is played as a round-robin mini-tournament at the pre-selected hosts.

In the main and the elite round, each team plays one home and one away match against each other team in its group.

=== Elite round ===
Group A

Pos	Team	Pld	Pts
1	Kazakhstan	6	18
2	Netherlands	6	9
3	Romania	6	4
4	Azerbaijan	6	4

Source: UEFA
Group B

Pos	Team	Pld	Pts
1	Ukraine	6	13
2	Poland	6	12
3	Serbia	6	8
4	Belgium	6	1

Source: UEFA
Group C

Pos	Team	Pld	Pts
1	France	6	16
2	Croatia	6	12
3	Slovakia	6	4
4	Germany	6	3

Source: UEFA

Group D

Pos	Team	Pld	Pts
1	Spain	6	16
2	Italy	6	7
3	Slovenia	6	7
4	Czech Republic	6	4

Source: UEFA
Group E

Pos	Team	Pld	Pts
1	Portugal	6	15
2	Finland	6	12
3	Georgia	6	6
4	Armenia	6	3

Source: UEFA

Ranking of runners up

Pos	Grp	Team	Pld	W	D	L	GF	GA	GD	Pts	Qualification
1	E	Finland	6	4	0	2	21	10	+11	12	Elite round play-offs
2	C	Croatia	6	4	0	2	20	10	+10	12	Elite round play-offs
3	B	Poland	6	4	0	2	21	14	+7	12	Elite round play-offs
4	A	Netherlands	6	3	0	3	14	10	+4	9	Elite round play-offs
5	D	Italy	6	2	1	3	14	18	−4	7	

Rules for classification: 1) points; 2) goal difference; 3) goals scored; 4) away goals scored; 5) wins; 6) away wins; 7) disciplinary points; 8) coefficient ranking.

=== Elite round play-offs ===
The matches were played on 12–17 April 2024. The winners of each tie will qualify to the 2024 FIFA Futsal World Cup.

Teams that enter the play-offs

- Croatia
- Finland
- Netherlands
- Poland

Team 1	Agg.	Team 2	1st leg	2nd leg
Netherlands	5–5 (5–4 p)	Finland	1–1	4–4
Poland	4–5	Croatia	2–3	2–2
