= 2021 CONCACAF Futsal Championship =

7th edition of the CONCACAF Futsal Championship

Campeonato de Futsal de CONCACAF 2021

Tournament details
- Host country: Guatemala
- City: Guatemala City
- Dates: 3–9 May
- Teams: 13 (from 1 confederation)
- Venue: 1 (in 1 host city)

Final positions
- Champions: Costa Rica (4th title)
- Runners-up: United States
- Third place: Guatemala
- Fourth place: Panama

Tournament statistics
- Matches played: 23
- Goals scored: 140 (6.09 per match)
- Top scorer: (Panama) Carlos Pérez (8 goals)
- Best player: (Costa Rica) Milinton Tijerino
- Best young player: (United States) Tomas Pondeca
- Best goalkeeper: (Costa Rica) Cesar Vargas
- Fair play award: Costa Rica

The 2021 CONCACAF Futsal Championship was the 7th edition of the CONCACAF Futsal Championship, the quadrennial international futsal championship organised by CONCACAF for the men's national teams of the North, Central American and Caribbean region. The tournament was originally scheduled to be held in Guatemala City, Guatemala between 1–10 May 2020. However, on 19 March 2020, CONCACAF announced the decision to postpone the tournament due to the COVID-19 pandemic. On 11 February 2021, CONCACAF confirmed Guatemala as host and that the dates are going to be May 3–9, 2021.

Same as previous editions, the tournament acted as the CONCACAF qualifiers for the FIFA Futsal World Cup. The top four teams of the tournament qualified for the 2021 FIFA Futsal World Cup (originally 2020 but postponed due to COVID-19 pandemic) in Lithuania as the CONCACAF representatives.

Costa Rica, the defending champions, won their third straight and fourth overall title. They, along with runners-up the United States, third-placed Guatemala, and fourth-placed Panama, qualified for the 2021 FIFA Futsal World Cup.

== Teams ==
The 41 CONCACAF teams were ranked based on the CONCACAF Futsal Ranking as of February 2020. A total of 20 teams originally entered the tournament. The highest-ranked 12 entrants would have advanced directly to the group stage of the final tournament, while the lowest-ranked eight entrants would have had to participate in the qualifying stage, where winners of the four matchups (played as two-game series) would have advanced to the group stage of the final tournament.

On 11 February 2021, CONCACAF announced that a total of 16 teams were going to play in the tournament. On 12 April 2021, CONCACAF announced that only 13 teams were going to play in the tournament.

Round	Rank	Team	Points	Appearance	Previous best performance	Previous FIFA Futsal World Cup appearances
Group stage	1	Guatemala (hosts)	2,416	5th	Champions (**2008**)	2008, 2012, 2016
Group stage	2	Panama	2,315	5th	Second place (2016)	2012, 2016
Group stage	3	Costa Rica (title holders)	2,120	7th	Champions (**2000**, **2012**, **2016**)	1992, 2000, 2012, 2016
Group stage	4	Cuba	2,024	7th	Second place (1996, 2000, 2004, 2008)	1996, 2000, 2004, 2008, 2016
Group stage	5	Mexico	1,143	7th	Third place (1996)	2012
Group stage	6	United States	1,046	6th	Champions (**1996**, **2004**)	1989, 1992, 1996, 2004, 2008
Group stage	7	Trinidad and Tobago	980	3rd	Group Stage (2004, 2008)	
Group stage	9	Canada	655	3rd	Group Stage (2012, 2016)	1989
Group stage	10	Curaçao (withdrew)	574	3rd	Group Stage (1996, 2016)	
Group stage	11	El Salvador	389	2nd	Group Stage (1996)	
Group stage	13	Guadeloupe (Note: Non-FIFA members and thus ineligible to play in World Cup.) (withdrew)	360	1st	Debut	
Group stage	14	Haiti	260	2nd	Group Stage (2008)	
Qualifying stage	15	Sint Maarten (withdrew)	245	1st	Debut	
Qualifying stage	16	Suriname	236	3rd	Group Stage (2000, 2004)	
Qualifying stage	19	Saint Kitts and Nevis (withdrew)	78	2nd	Group Stage (2012)	
Qualifying stage	20	Nicaragua	63	2nd	Group Stage (2000)	
Qualifying stage	22	Puerto Rico (withdrew)	36	2nd	Group Stage (2000)	
Qualifying stage	32	Dominican Republic	0	1st	Debut	
Qualifying stage	33	French Guiana (withdrew)	0	1st	Debut	
Qualifying stage	35	Martinique (withdrew)	0	1st	Debut	

Championship years are in bold, hosting years are in italics

Did not enter tournament

Rank	Team	Points
8	Honduras	672
12	Guyana	377
17	Jamaica	101
18	Antigua and Barbuda	100
21	Belize	58
23	Anguilla	0
24	Aruba	0

Rank	Team	Points
25	Bahamas	0
26	Barbados	0
27	Bermuda	0
28	Bonaire	0
29	British Virgin Islands	0
30	Cayman Islands	0
31	Dominica	0

Rank	Team	Points
34	Grenada	0
36	Montserrat	0
37	Saint Lucia	0
38	Saint Martin	0
39	Saint Vincent and the Grenadines	0
40	Turks and Caicos Islands	0
41	U.S. Virgin Islands	0

== Venues ==
The matches were played at the Domo Polideportivo de la CDAG in Guatemala City. Before the postponement of the tournament, matches were originally also to be played at the Teodoro Palacios Flores Gymnasium.

2021 CONCACAF Futsal Championship is located in Guatemala	Guatemala City
2021 CONCACAF Futsal Championship is located in Guatemala	Domo Polideportivo
2021 CONCACAF Futsal Championship is located in Guatemala	Capacity: 7,500

== Draw ==
The draw for the group stage took place on 20 February 2020, 14:00 EST (UTC−5), at the CONCACAF Headquarters in Miami. The 16 teams, which included the 12 which entered the group stage and the four qualifying stage matchups winners, were drawn into four groups of four teams. Based on the CONCACAF Futsal Ranking, the 12 teams which entered the group stage were distributed into three pots, with teams in Pot 1 assigned to each group prior to the draw, as follows:

Pot 1	Pot 2	Pot 3
Guatemala (Group A/Host); Panama (Group B); Costa Rica (Group C); Cuba (Group D)	Mexico; United States; Trinidad and Tobago; Canada	Curaçao; El Salvador; Guadeloupe; Haiti

The qualifying stage matchups were determined based on the CONCACAF Futsal Ranking, with the highest-ranked team playing the lowest-ranked team, etc. The qualifying stage winners 1, 2, 3 and 4 were then placed in groups A, B, C and D respectively.

=== Original draw ===
The original draw results involving the 20 teams were as follows:

Group	Pot 1 team	Pot 2 team	Pot 3 team	Winner from qualifying stage	
A	Guatemala	Trinidad and Tobago	~~Guadeloupe~~	~~Sint Maarten~~	~~Martinique~~
B	Panama	Mexico	~~Curaçao~~	Suriname	~~French Guiana~~
C	Costa Rica	Canada	Haiti	~~Saint Kitts and Nevis~~	Dominican Republic
D	Cuba	United States	El Salvador	Nicaragua	~~Puerto Rico~~

Following the withdrawals of Sint Maarten, Curaçao, Saint Kitts and Nevis, and Puerto Rico, only 16 teams were left, so the qualifying stage was no longer necessary, and the 16 remaining teams were placed in the four groups as before as there were four teams in each group. Following the withdrawals of Guadeloupe, Martinique, and French Guiana, only 13 teams were left, and as there were only two teams left in Group A, to ensure that each group had a minimum of three teams, Dominican Republic were moved from Group C to Group A.

== Match officials ==
The list of match officials were announced on 20 April 2021.

== Squads ==
Each team must register a squad of 14 players, two of whom must be goalkeepers.

== Group stage ==
The top two teams in each group advance to the quarter-finals.

Tiebreakers

The ranking of teams in each group is determined as follows (Regulations Article 12.7):

1. Points obtained in all group matches (three points for a win, one for a draw, zero for a loss);
2. Goal difference in all group matches;
3. Number of goals scored in all group matches;
4. Points obtained in the matches played between the teams in question;
5. Goal difference in the matches played between the teams in question;
6. Number of goals scored in the matches played between the teams in question;
7. Fair play points in all group matches (only one deduction could be applied to a player in a single match):
  - Yellow card: −1 points;
  - Indirect red card (second yellow card): −3 points;
  - Direct red card: −4 points;
  - Yellow card and direct red card: −5 points;
8. Drawing of lots.

All times are local, CST (UTC−6).

=== Group A ===
Pos	Team	Pld	W	D	L	GF	GA	GD	Pts	Qualification
1	Guatemala	2	2	0	0	8	5	+3	6	Knockout stage
2	Dominican Republic	2	1	0	1	8	6	+2	3	Knockout stage
3	Trinidad and Tobago	2	0	0	2	5	10	−5	0	

Source: CONCACAF
Rules for classification: Tiebreakers
3 May 2021
20:00

Dominican Republic	2–4	Guatemala
Gómez 14'; Domínguez 27'	Report	Aguilar 3'; Sandoval 18'; Alay 19'; González 30'

Domo Polideportivo de la CDAG, Guatemala City
Attendance: Josh Wilkens (USA), Francisco Cedeño (Panama)

4 May 2021
20:00

Trinidad and Tobago	2–6	Dominican Republic
George 32'; Neptune 39'	Report	Gómez 5', 33', 35'; Álvarez 25'; López 27'; Cestero 40'

Domo Polideportivo de la CDAG, Guatemala City
Referee: Yeraldín Araya (Costa Rica), Francisco Cedeño (Panama)

5 May 2021
20:00

Guatemala	4–3	Trinidad and Tobago
Aguilar 11', 39'; Ramos 12'; Ruiz 21'	Report	Benny 9', 33'; Neptune 16'

Domo Polideportivo de la CDAG, Guatemala City
Referee: Dunia Aguilera (Cuba), Francisco López (Nicaragua)

=== Group B ===
Pos	Team	Pld	W	D	L	GF	GA	GD	Pts	Qualification
1	Panama	2	2	0	0	16	5	+11	6	Knockout stage
2	Suriname	2	1	0	1	6	15	−9	3	Knockout stage
3	Mexico	2	0	0	2	8	10	−2	0	

Source: CONCACAF
Rules for classification: Tiebreakers
3 May 2021
16:00

Suriname	1–11	Panama
Milito 5'	Report	Hinks 2'; Castrellón 3', 16'; Del Rosario 13', 27'; Ortiz 18', 29'; Pérez 26', 37' (pen.), 37' (pen.); Campos 36'

Domo Polideportivo de la CDAG, Guatemala City
Referee: Reiner Solís (Cuba), José Barrera (El Salvador)

4 May 2021
16:00

Mexico	4–5	Suriname
Paniagua 5', 33'; Soltero 6'; Atri 9'	Report	Sastromedjo 12'; Maatrijk 16'; Doesburg 18'; Sánchez 25' (o.g.); Pita 39'

Domo Polideportivo de la CDAG, Guatemala City
Referee: Ahmed Almahamid (Cuba), Joel Cuba (Nicaragua)

5 May 2021
16:00

Panama	5–4	Mexico
Hinks 3'; Pérez 13', 29', 39' (pen.); Castrellón 33'	Report	Paniagua 11'; Limón 12'; Vences 20'; Atri 35'

Domo Polideportivo de la CDAG, Guatemala City
Referee: Carlos González (Guatemala), Adrián Martínez (Cuba)

=== Group C ===
Pos	Team	Pld	W	D	L	GF	GA	GD	Pts	Qualification
1	Costa Rica	2	2	0	0	12	1	+11	6	Knockout stage
2	Canada	2	1	0	1	5	7	−2	3	Knockout stage
3	Haiti	2	0	0	2	2	11	−9	0	

Source: CONCACAF
Rules for classification: Tiebreakers
3 May 2021
18:00

Haiti	0–7	Costa Rica
	Report	Cabalceta 2', 4', 20'; Cordero 19'; Tijerino 23', 38'; Guevara 37'

Domo Polideportivo de la CDAG, Guatemala City
Referee: Carlos González (Guatemala), Brenda Valdez (Cuba)

4 May 2021
18:00

Canada	4–2	Haiti
Graham 33'; Bennett 37'; Mlah 40'; Dicko-Raynauld 40'	Report	Monfort 16'; Syla 20'

Domo Polideportivo de la CDAG, Guatemala City
Referee: Dunia Aguilera (Cuba), Óscar González (Guatemala)

5 May 2021
18:00

Costa Rica	5–1	Canada
Guevara 5'; Garro 6', 35' (pen.); Rodríguez 8'; Vargas 20'	Report	Bennett 35'

Domo Polideportivo de la CDAG, Guatemala City
Referee: Jorge Flores (El Salvador), Israel Dávila (Guatemala)

=== Group D ===
Pos	Team	Pld	W	D	L	GF	GA	GD	Pts	Qualification
1	United States	3	2	1	0	9	5	+4	7	Knockout stage
2	El Salvador	3	2	1	0	8	4	+4	7	Knockout stage
3	Nicaragua	3	1	0	2	8	10	−2	3	
4	Cuba	3	0	0	3	4	10	−6	0	

Source: CONCACAF
Rules for classification: Tiebreakers
3 May 2021
12:00

Cuba	1–4	Nicaragua
Moratón 32'	Report	Downs 17'; Kripp 29'; Marrero 32' (o.g.); Zepeda 38'

Domo Polideportivo de la CDAG, Guatemala City
Referee: Ronny Castro (Costa Rica), Josué Molina (Costa Rica)
3 May 2021
14:00

United States	1–1	El Salvador
Maciel 28'	Report	Muñoz 19'

Domo Polideportivo de la CDAG, Guatemala City
Referee: Diego López (Costa Rica), Ricardo Lay (Panama)

4 May 2021
12:00

El Salvador	2–1	Cuba
Solís 27'; Sandoval 32'	Report	Castillo 13'

Domo Polideportivo de la CDAG, Guatemala City
Referee: Christopher Grabas (Canada), Manual Rosario (Dominican Republic)
4 May 2021
14:00

Nicaragua	2–4	United States
Corea 33'; Luna 35'	Report	Klepal 5', 31'; Buenfil 18'; Pondeca 40'

Domo Polideportivo de la CDAG, Guatemala City
Referee: Francisco Rivera (Mexico), Erick Coello (Honduras)

5 May 2021
12:00

El Salvador	5–2	Nicaragua
Gómez 18'; Díaz 19'; Chávez 26'; Contreras 34', 37'	Report	Kripp 18'; Salinas 30'

Domo Polideportivo de la CDAG, Guatemala City
Referee: Roberto López (Panama), Diego Molina (Costa Rica)
5 May 2021
14:00

Cuba	2–4	United States
Marrero 4'; Castillo 23'	Report	Escobar 12', 20', 33'; Gonzalez 40'

Domo Polideportivo de la CDAG, Guatemala City
Referee: Ronny Castro (Costa Rica), Ricardo Lay (Panama)

== Knockout stage ==
In the knockout stage, extra time and penalty shoot-out are used to decide the winner if necessary.

=== Bracket ===
Quarter-finals
7 May – Domo Polideportivo
Panama (p)	1 (4)
Canada	1 (3)
7 May – Domo Polideportivo
Costa Rica	12
Suriname	1
7 May – Domo Polideportivo
United States	2
Dominican Republic	0
7 May – Domo Polideportivo
Guatemala (p)	3 (4)
El Salvador	3 (3)

Semi-finals
8 May – Domo Polideportivo
Panama	1
Costa Rica	3
8 May – Domo Polideportivo
United States (p)	2 (5)
Guatemala	2 (4)

Final
9 May – Domo Polideportivo
Costa Rica	3
United States	2
Third place match
9 May – Domo Polideportivo
Panama	2
Guatemala (a.e.t.)	3

=== Quarter-finals ===
Winners qualify for 2021 FIFA Futsal World Cup.

7 May 2021
12:30

United States	2–0	Dominican Republic
Araujo 3'; Pondeca 27'	Report

Domo Polideportivo de la CDAG, Guatemala City
Referee: Yeraldín Araya (Costa Rica), Diego Molina (Costa Rica)

7 May 2021
15:00

Panama	1–1 (a.e.t.)	Canada
Ortiz 20'	Report	Bennett 27'
Penalties
Milord (penalty scored); Castrellón (penalty scored); Pérez (penalty missed); Del Rosario (penalty scored); Maquensi (penalty scored)	4–3	(penalty scored) Belguendouz; (penalty missed) Leconte; (penalty scored) Renaud; (penalty scored) Rodriguez; (penalty missed) Bennett

Domo Polideportivo de la CDAG, Guatemala City
Referee: Carlos González (Guatemala), Jorge Flores (El Salvador)

7 May 2021
17:30

Costa Rica	12–1	Suriname
Cordero 7' (pen.), 15'; Benali 7' (o.g.); Rodríguez 7', 8', 40'; Cubillo 26'; Gamboa 27', 35', 37'; Fonseca 31'; Cabalceta 39'	Report	Esajas 17'

Domo Polideportivo de la CDAG, Guatemala City
Referee: Josh Wilkens (USA), José Barrera (El Salvador)

7 May 2021
20:00

Guatemala	3–3 (a.e.t.)	El Salvador
Ramos 34'; Alvarado 40', 46'	Report	Contreras 19'; Martínez 28'; Sandoval 47'
Penalties
Alay (penalty missed); Santizo (penalty scored); Aguilar (penalty scored); Ramos (penalty scored); Alvarado (penalty scored)	4–3	(penalty missed) Solís; (penalty scored) Muñoz; (penalty missed) Sandoval; (penalty scored) Aguilar; (penalty scored) Martínez

Domo Polideportivo de la CDAG, Guatemala City
Referee: Roberto López (Panama), Ricardo Lay (Panama)

=== Semi-finals ===
8 May 2021
15:00

Panama	1–3	Costa Rica
Pérez 20'	Report	Gómez 32', 34'; Cabalceta 34'

Domo Polideportivo de la CDAG, Guatemala City
Referee: Josh Wilkens (USA), Francisco Rivera (Mexico)

8 May 2021
18:00

United States	2–2 (a.e.t.)	Guatemala
Gonzalez 8'; Reget 46'	Report	Ramos 21'; Santizo 44'
Penalties
Mattos (penalty missed); Maciel (penalty scored); Klepal (penalty scored); Gonzalez (penalty missed); Ventura-Junior (penalty scored); Sobreira (penalty scored); Buenfil (penalty scored)	5–4	(penalty scored) Alay; (penalty scored) Santizo; (penalty missed) Aguilar; (penalty missed) Ramos; (penalty scored) Alvarado; (penalty scored) Ruiz; (penalty missed) Campaignac

Domo Polideportivo de la CDAG, Guatemala City
Referee: Ronny Castro (Costa Rica), Jorge Flores (El Salvador)

=== Third place match ===
9 May 2021
15:00

Panama	2–3 (a.e.t.)	Guatemala
Ortiz 31'; Pérez 36' (pen.)	Report	Alvarado 3'; Enríquez 32'; Campaignac 49'

Domo Polideportivo de la CDAG, Guatemala City
Referee: Yeraldín Araya (Costa Rica), José Barrera (El Salvador)

=== Final ===
9 May 2021
18:00

Costa Rica	3–2	United States
Gómez 12', 19'; Cordero 14'	Report	Gonzalez 6'; Reget 16'

Domo Polideportivo de la CDAG, Guatemala City
Referee: Carlos González (Guatemala), Roberto López (Panama)

== Qualified teams for FIFA Futsal World Cup ==
The following four teams from CONCACAF qualified for the 2021 FIFA Futsal World Cup.

Team	Qualified on	Previous appearances in FIFA Futsal World Cup^{1}
United States	7 May 2021	5 (1989, 1992, 1996, 2004, 2008)
Panama	7 May 2021	2 (2012, 2016)
Costa Rica	7 May 2021	4 (1992, 2000, 2012, 2016)
Guatemala	7 May 2021	4 (2000, 2008, 2012, 2016)

^{1} Bold indicates champions for that year. Italic indicates hosts for that year.

== Awards ==
The following awards were given at the conclusion of the tournament:

- Best Player Award: (Costa Rica) Milinton Tijerino
- Young Player Award: (United States) Tomas Pondeca
- Top Scorer Award: (Panama) Carlos Pérez (8 goals)
- Best Goalkeeper Award: (Costa Rica) Cesar Vargas
- Fair Play Award: Costa Rica
