= Suriname national futsal team =

National futsal team of Suriname

Suriname
- Nickname(s): Natio (National); A-Selektie (A-Selection)
- Association: Surinaamse Voetbal Bond
- Confederation: CONCACAF
- FIFA code: SUR
- FIFA ranking: 94 ▲1 (8 May 2026)
| Home colours | Away colours |

First international
- Cuba 13–4 Suriname (Heredia, Costa Rica; 20 July 2000)

Biggest win
- Turks and Caicos Islands 1–15 Suriname (Saint Augustine, Trinidad and Tobago; 20 April 2004)

Biggest defeat
- Suriname 1–13 Costa Rica (Heredia, Costa Rica; 23 July 2004)

CONCACAF Futsal Championship
- Appearances: 4 (First in 2000)
- Best result: Quarter-finals (2021)

The Suriname national futsal team is controlled by the Surinamese Football Association, the governing body for football in Suriname and represents the country in international futsal competitions, such as the World Cup and the CONCACAF Championships.

Just like the Suriname national football team in field soccer, the national futsal team is also nicknamed Natio.

== Tournaments ==
=== FIFA Futsal World Cup ===
- 1989 to 1996 – did not enter
- 2000 – did not qualify
- 2004 – did not qualify
- 2008 – did not qualify
- 2012 – did not enter
- 2016 – did not enter
- 2021 – did not qualify
- 2024 – did not qualify

=== CONCACAF Futsal Championship ===
- 1996 – did not enter
- 2000 – Group Stage
- 2004 – Group Stage
- 2008 – did not qualify
- 2012 – did not qualify
- 2016 – did not enter
- 2021 – Quarter-finals
- 2024 – Group Stage

==== Until 2020 ====
Futsal has nearly only been played on a national level until 2000. In that year the national selection only reached the qualification matches in Costa Rica. In 2004 it played its qualification matches in Costa Rica again. Suriname ended at number 3 in the second round, but did not succeed to qualify for the last round.

==== 2021 ====
In 2021 the national team, led by Serghino Reding, left on 1 May for Guatemala. Natio (Suriname) played in the group with Mexico and Guatemala. In the first group the match against Panama was lost with 1–11. Next, Suriname won from Mexico with 5–4, and ended as runner-up in the group. In the quarter final against Costa Rica, Suriname lost with 1–11, signaling the end of the CONCACAF Cup journey for Natio. With it, the dream of the players to qualify for the Futsal World Cup ended as well.

==== 2024 ====
In 2024 Natio held up the goal again to qualify for the Futsal World Cup. Suriname lost in the opening match against Mexico with 7–3, and the second match against Costa Rica as well, with 1–3. In the last match Surinam won with 4–0 against Haiti. Suriname ended on number 3, which finally was not enough to qualify for the next round.
