= Haiti national futsal team =

Haiti
- Nickname(s): Les Grenadiers; Le Rouge et Bleu; Les Bicolores; La Sélection Nationale
- Association: Fédération Haïtienne de Football (FHF)
- Confederation: CONCACAF
- FIFA code: HAI
- FIFA ranking: 133 (4 April 2025)
Home colours	Away colours

First international
- Canada 9–5 Haiti (Quebec City, Canada; September 23, 2001)

Biggest win
- Haiti 19–1 Sint Maarten (Port of Spain, Trinidad and Tobago; April 5, 2008)

Biggest defeat
- Haiti 0–13 Costa Rica (Guatemala City, Guatemala; June 4, 2008)

FIFA World Cup
- Appearances: 0

CONCACAF Futsal Championship
- Appearances: 3 (First in 2008)
- Best result: Group Stage (2008, 2021, 2024)

The Haiti national futsal team is controlled by the Fédération Haïtienne de Football, the governing body for futsal in Haiti, and represents the country in international futsal competitions, such as the CONCACAF Championships, but has yet to qualify for a World Cup.

== Tournaments ==
=== FIFA Futsal World Cup ===
- 1989 to 2008 - did not qualify
- 2012 to 2016 - did not enter
- 2021 to 2024 - did not qualify

=== CONCACAF Futsal Championship ===
- 1996 - did not qualify
- 2000 - did not qualify
- 2004 - did not qualify
- 2008 - Group Stage (8th)
- 2012 - did not enter
- 2016 - did not enter
- 2021 - Group Stage (13th)
- 2024 - Group Stage (11th)
