= 2011 Grand Prix de Futsal =

Tournament details
- Host country: Brazil
- Dates: 16 October – 23 October
- Teams: 16 (from 5 confederations)
- Venues: 2 (in 1 host city)

Final positions
- Champions: Brazil (6th title)
- Runners-up: Russia
- Third place: Argentina
- Fourth place: Iran

Tournament statistics
- Matches played: 48
- Goals scored: 345 (7.19 per match)
- Top scorer: (Belgium) André Vanderlei (11 Goals)

The 2011 Grand Prix de Futsal was the seventh edition of the international futsal competition of the same kind as the FIFA Futsal World Cup but with invited nations and held annually in Brazil. It was first held in 2005.

== Venues ==
Arena	Arena Amadeu Teixeira	Ginásio Principal do SESI
City	Manaus	Manaus
Capacity	11,800	2,000

== Bidding ==
Manaus beat bids from Rio de Janeiro and Uruguay.

== Participating ==
The following 16 teams, shown with they pre-tournament rankings.

AFC (1)

- Iran (6)

CAF (3)

- Angola (38)
- Mozambique (43)
- Zambia (81)

CONCACAF (3)

- Guatemala (24)
- Costa Rica (25)
- United States (21)

CONMEBOL (4)

- Argentina (7)
- Brazil (2)
- Paraguay (9)
- Uruguay (30)

UEFA (5)

- Belgium (27)
- Czech Republic (13)
- Hungary (26)
- Netherlands (22)
- Russia (4)

=== Draw pots ===
- Pot 1

Brazil
Guatemala
Netherlands
Angola

- Pot 2

Russia
Zambia
Costa Rica
Paraguay

- Pot 3

Iran
Belgium
Uruguay
USA

- Pot 4

Argentina
Hungary
Mozambique
Czech Republic

== Squads ==
Each nation submitted a squad of 15 players, including three goalkeepers.

== First round ==
=== Group A ===
Team	Pld	W	D	L	GF	GA	GD	Pts
Brazil	3	3	0	0	20	3	+17	9
Guatemala	3	1	1	1	6	8	−2	4
Netherlands	3	1	0	2	9	11	−2	3
Angola	3	0	1	2	5	18	−13	1

2011-10-16

Brazil	5–0	Guatemala

Amadeu Teixeira Arena
2011-10-16

Angola	2–6	Netherlands

Ginásio Principal do SESI
2011-10-17

Netherlands	1–4	Guatemala

Ginásio Principal do SESI
2011-10-17

Brazil	10–1	Angola

Amadeu Teixeira Arena
2011-10-18

Guatemala	2–2	Angola

Ginásio Principal do SESI
2011-10-18

Brazil	5–2	Netherlands

Amadeu Teixeira Arena

=== Group B ===
Team	Pld	W	D	L	GF	GA	GD	Pts
Russia	3	3	0	0	21	5	+16	9
Paraguay	3	2	0	1	9	6	+3	6
Costa Rica	3	1	0	2	13	11	+2	3
Zambia	3	0	0	3	3	24	−21	0

2011-10-16

Russia	13–1	Zambia

Amadeu Teixeira Arena
2011-10-16

Paraguay	4–3	Costa Rica

Ginásio Principal do SESI
2011-10-17

Paraguay	2–3	Russia

Amadeu Teixeira Arena
2011-10-17

Costa Rica	8–2	Zambia

Ginásio Principal do SESI
2011-10-18

Zambia	0–3	Paraguay

Ginásio Principal do SESI
2011-10-18

Russia	5–2	Costa Rica

Amadeu Teixeira Arena

=== Group C ===
Team	Pld	W	D	L	GF	GA	GD	Pts
Iran	3	3	0	0	15	3	+12	9
Uruguay	3	1	1	1	10	5	+5	4
Belgium	3	1	1	1	14	13	+1	4
United States	3	0	0	3	7	25	−18	0

2011-10-16

Iran	4–2	Belgium

Amadeu Teixeira Arena
2011-10-16

Uruguay	7–0	United States

Ginásio Principal do SESI
2011-10-17

United States	0–8	Iran

Amadeu Teixeira Arena
2011-10-17

Uruguay	2–2	Belgium

Ginásio Principal do SESI
2011-10-18

Iran	3–1	Uruguay

Amadeu Teixeira Arena
2011-10-18

Belgium	10–7	United States

Ginásio Principal do SESI

=== Group D ===
Team	Pld	W	D	L	GF	GA	GD	Pts
Argentina	3	2	1	0	13	6	+7	7
Czech Republic	3	2	1	0	11	7	+4	7
Hungary	3	1	0	2	10	14	−4	3
Mozambique	3	0	0	3	7	14	−7	0

2011-10-16

Argentina	4–1	Hungary

Amadeu Teixeira Arena
2011-10-16

Mozambique	1–2	Czech Republic

Ginásio Principal do SESI
2011-10-17

Czech Republic	4–4	Argentina

Amadeu Teixeira Arena
2011-10-17

Mozambique	5–7	Hungary

Ginásio Principal do SESI
2011-10-18

Argentina	5–1	Mozambique

Amadeu Teixeira Arena
2011-10-18

Hungary	2–5	Czech Republic

Ginásio Principal do SESI

== Final round ==
=== Classification 9th–16th ===
Ginásio da UniEvangélica

Quarter finals
October 20
Netherlands	5
United States	2
October 20
Belgium	4 (1)
Angola	4 (4)
October 20
Costa Rica	2
Mozambique	4
October 20
Hungary	2
Zambia	1

9th–12th playoffs
October 21
Netherlands (aet)	6
Angola	5
October 21
Mozambique	3
Hungary	7

9th place
October 22
Netherlands (aet)	2
Hungary	1
11th place
October 22
Angola	9
Mozambique	2

13th–16th playoffs
October 21
United States	1
Belgium	4
October 21
Costa Rica	3
Zambia	7

13th place
October 22
Belgium	10
Zambia	3
15th place
October 22
United States	0
Costa Rica	1

==== 9th–16th playoffs ====
2011-10-20

Netherlands	5–2	United States

Ginásio Principal do SESI
2011-10-20

Belgium	4 – 4 P(1–4)	Angola

Ginásio Principal do SESI
2011-10-20

Costa Rica	2–4	Mozambique

Ginásio Principal do SESI
2011-10-20

Hungary	2–1	Zambia

Ginásio Principal do SESI

==== 13th–16th playoffs ====
2011-10-21

United States	1–4	Belgium

Ginásio Principal do SESI
2011-10-21

Costa Rica	3–7	Zambia

Ginásio Principal do SESI

==== 9th–12th playoffs ====
2011-10-21

Netherlands	6–5 (a.e.t.)	Angola

Ginásio Principal do SESI
2011-10-21

Mozambique	3–7	Hungary

Ginásio Principal do SESI

==== 15th place match ====
2011-10-22

Costa Rica	1–0	United States

Ginásio Principal do SESI

==== 13th place match ====
2011-10-22

Belgium	10–3	Zambia

Ginásio Principal do SESI

==== 11th place match ====
2011-10-22

Angola	9–2	Mozambique

Ginásio Principal do SESI

==== 9th place match ====
2011-10-22

Netherlands	2–1 (a.e.t.)	Hungary

Ginásio Principal do SESI

=== Classification 1st–8th ===
Ginásio Newton de Faria

Quarter finals
October 20
Argentina	7
Paraguay	3
October 20
Russia	4
Czech Republic	2
October 20
Brazil	12
Uruguay	0
October 20
Iran	4
Guatemala	2

Semifinals
October 21
Argentina	2
Russia (aet)	3
October 21
Brazil	4
Iran	1

Final
October 23
Russia	1
Brazil	2
3rd place
October 22
Argentina	4
Iran	2

5th–8th playoffs
October 21
Paraguay	6
Czech Republic	2
October 21
Uruguay	4 (3)
Guatemala	4 (4)

5th place
October 22
Paraguay	3
Guatemala	5
7th place
October 22
Czech Republic	3
Uruguay	4

==== Quarterfinals ====
2011-10-20

Argentina	7–3	Paraguay

Amadeu Teixeira Arena
2011-10-20

Russia	4–2	Czech Republic

Amadeu Teixeira Arena
2011-10-20

Brazil	12–0	Uruguay

Amadeu Teixeira Arena
2011-10-20

Iran	4–2	Guatemala

Amadeu Teixeira Arena

==== 5th–8th playoffs ====
2011-10-21

Paraguay	6–2	Czech Republic

Amadeu Teixeira Arena
2011-10-21

Uruguay	4 – 4 P(3–4)	Guatemala

Amadeu Teixeira Arena

==== Semifinals ====
2011-10-21

Argentina	2–3 (a.e.t.)	Russia

Amadeu Teixeira Arena
2011-10-21

Brazil	4–1	Iran

Amadeu Teixeira Arena

==== 7th place match ====
2011-10-22

Uruguay	4–3	Czech Republic

Amadeu Teixeira Arena

==== 5th place match ====
2011-10-22

Guatemala	5–3	Paraguay

Amadeu Teixeira Arena

==== 3rd place match ====
2011-10-22

Argentina	4–2	Iran

Amadeu Teixeira Arena

==== Final ====
2011-10-23

Russia	1–2	Brazil

Amadeu Teixeira Arena

== Final standing ==
Rank	Team
1st place, gold medalist(s)	Brazil
2nd place, silver medalist(s)	Russia
3rd place, bronze medalist(s)	Argentina
4	Iran
5	Guatemala
6	Paraguay
7	Uruguay
8	Czech Republic
9	Netherlands
10	Hungary
11	Angola
12	Mozambique
13	Belgium
14	Zambia
15	Costa Rica
16	United States

2011 Grand Prix de Futsal winners

Brazil
Fifth title

Team roster:
Djony, Tiago, Franklin, Neto, Carlinhos, Jackson, Vinicius, Gadeia, Lukaian, Fernando, Simi, Falcão, Valdin, Rodrigo, Murilo.
Head coach: Marcos Sorato
