= Zach Reget =

American soccer player

Personal information
- Full name: Zachary Reget
- Date of birth: May 7, 1995 (age 31)
- Place of birth: Kenosha, Wisconsin, United States
- Height: 6 ft 0 in (1.83 m)
- Positions: Forward; Pivot

Team information
- Current team: Kansas City Comets
- Number: 8

College career
Years	Team	Apps	(Gls)
2013–2016	Trinity International Trojans	68	(26)

Senior career*
Years	Team	Apps	(Gls)
2018–2019	St. Louis Ambush (indoor)	24	(22)
2019–2023	Florida Tropics (indoor)	62	(64)
2023	Harrisburg Heat (indoor)	2	(2)
2023–	Kansas City Comets (indoor)	33	(48)
- * Club domestic league appearances and goals as of November 30, 2024

Zach Reget (born May 7, 1995) is an American professional soccer and futsal player. He was named the Major Arena Soccer League's Rookie of the Year in 2018–19.

== Playing career ==
Zach started his soccer career as a player for Trinity International University team. Then, he went on to play for the St. Louis Ambush where he was awarded the Rookie of the Year. During his season there, he managed to score 22 goals in 24 games as a target forward. Later, Zach signed with Florida Tropics SC and scored a total of 27 goals and made 16 assists of the 2021–22 season.

Zach also played on the United States national futsal team and made an appearance in the CONCACAF Tournament as well as won a silver. He qualified for the 2021 CONCACAF Futsal Championship made an appearance in all the games played. Recently, he was nominated for the 2022 U.S. Futsal Player of the Year and played another season for the Florida Tropics SC in 2022.
