= Nicaragua national futsal team =

Nicaragua
- Nickname(s): La Azul y Blanco (The Blue and White); Los Pinoleros (The Pinoleros)
- Association: Federación Nicaragüense de Fútbol
- Confederation: CONCACAF
- FIFA code: NCA
- FIFA ranking: 103 ▲2 (4 April 2025)
Home colours	Away colours

First international
- Costa Rica 10–1 Nicaragua (Heredia, Costa Rica; 20 July 2000)

Biggest win
- Cuba 1–4 Nicaragua (Guatemala City, Guatemala; 3 May 2021)

Biggest defeat
- Guatemala 13–2 Nicaragua (Guatemala City, Guatemala; 27 January 2016)

CONCACAF Futsal Championship
- Appearances: 3 (First in 2000)
- Best result: Group Stage (2000, 2021, 2024)

The Nicaragua national futsal team is controlled by the Nicaraguan Football Federation, the governing body for football in Nicaragua and represents the country in international futsal competitions, such as the World Cup and the CONCACAF Championships.

== Tournaments ==
=== FIFA Futsal World Cup ===
- 1989 to 1996 – did not enter
- 2000 – did not qualify
- 2004 to 2012 – did not enter
- 2016 – did not qualify
- 2021 – did not qualify
- 2024 – did not qualify

=== CONCACAF Futsal Championship ===
- 1996 – did not enter
- 2000 – Group Stage
- 2004 to 2012 – did not enter
- 2016 – did not qualify
- 2021 – Group Stage
- 2024 – Group Stage
