= United States men's national futsal team =

National sports team

United States
- Shirt badge/Association crest
- Nickname(s): USMNT; Team USA; The Stars and Stripes; The Yanks
- Association: United States Soccer Federation (USSF); U.S. Soccer
- Confederation: CONCACAF
- Head coach: Hewerton Moreira
- FIFA code: USA
- FIFA ranking: 76 ▼1 (8 May 2026)
Home colors	Away colors

First international
- Netherlands 4–1 United States (Budapest, Hungary; November 18, 1986)

Biggest win
- United States 10–0 Canada (Baltimore, Maryland; March 20, 2002)

Biggest defeat
- Slovenia 14–0 United States (Koper, Slovenia; January 27, 2016)

FIFA World Cup
- Appearances: 6 (First in 1989)
- Best result: (silver) 2nd place (1992)

AMF World Cup
- Appearances: 4 (First in 1988)
- Best result: First round (1988, 1991, 1994, 1997)

North and Central American Futsal Championship
- Appearances: 7 (First in 1996)
- Best result: (gold) Champions (1996, 2004)

Grand Prix de Futsal
- Appearances: 1 (First in 2011)
- Best result: 16th place (2011)

The United States national futsal team represents the United States at international futsal competitions. It is governed by the United States Soccer Federation and the U.S. Soccer, affiliated with CONCACAF. The U.S. Futsal Federation was founded in 1981 and the first international futsal match played by the U.S. National Futsal Team was in May 1984 in Nanaimo, Canada where the United States won, 6–5. The first international futsal match in the United States was held in December, 1985, at Sonoma State University in Rohnert Park, California. The U.S. select team, defeated Australia, 9–5.

The U.S. golden age of futsal was in the late 1980s and early 1990s when the team achieved third-place at 1989 FIFA Futsal World Championship and runner-up at 1992 FIFA Futsal World Championship. After that, U.S. futsal has dropped down. They have also won CONCACAF Futsal Championships twice.

== Competitive record ==
=== FIFA Futsal World Cup ===
FIFA Futsal World Cup record
Year	Round	GP	W	D	L	GS	GA
Netherlands 1989	3rd place	8	6	1	1	24	11
Hong Kong 1992	2nd place	8	4	2	2	34	23
Spain 1996	1st round	3	1	0	2	12	7
Guatemala 2000	Did not qualify						
Taiwan 2004	2nd round	6	1	1	4	14	20
Brazil 2008	1st round	4	0	0	4	5	25
Thailand 2012	Did not qualify						
Colombia 2016	Did not qualify						
Lithuania 2021	Group stage	3	0	0	3	2	22
Uzbekistan 2024	Did not qualify						
Total	6/10	32	12	4	16	91	108

=== CONCACAF Futsal Championship ===
CONCACAF Futsal Championship record
Year	Round	GP	W	D*	L	GF	GA
Guatemala 1996	Winners	4	3	0	1	21	12
Costa Rica 2000	3rd place	5	4	0	1	22	7
Costa Rica 2004	Winners	5	3	2	0	15	3
Guatemala 2008	3rd place	5	3	1	1	19	11
Guatemala 2012	1st round	3	1	0	2	6	9
Costa Rica 2016	Did not qualify						
Guatemala 2021	Runners-up	6	3	2	1	15	10
Nicaragua 2024	Quarter finals	4	1	1	2	17	16
Total	7/8	32	18	6	8	115	68

*Draws include matches decided on penalty kicks

=== Grand Prix de Futsal ===
- 2005 – Did not enter
- 2006 – Did not enter
- 2007 – Did not enter
- 2008 – Did not enter
- 2009 – Did not enter
- 2010 – Did not enter
- 2011 – 16th place
- 2013 – Did not enter
- 2014 – Did not enter
- 2015 – Did not enter

=== Futsal Mundialito ===
- 1994 – Did not enter
- 1995 – 4th place
- 1996 – 4th place
- 1998 – (bronze) 3rd place
- 2001 – Did not enter
- 2002 – Did not enter
- 2006 – Did not enter
- 2007 – Did not enter
- 2008 – Did not enter

=== Pan American Games ===
- Rio de Janeiro 2007 – 5th place

== Results and fixtures ==
The following is a list of match results in the last 12 months, as well as any future matches that have been scheduled.

Legend

Win Draw Lose Fixture

=== 2021 ===
September 14, 2021 FIFA Futsal World Cup GS Group F	Argentina	11–0; Source (FIFA)	United States	Vilnius, Lithuania
20:00 EEST (UTC+3)	Brandi 1', 2', 12', 40'; Cuzzolino 4'; Rescia 5'; Basile 7', 16'; Claudino 17', 25'; Borruto 24'	Report (FIFA)		Stadium: Avia Solutions Group Arena

September 17, 2021 FIFA Futsal World Cup GS Group F	Iran	4–2; Source (FIFA)	United States	Vilnius, Lithuania
18:00 EEST (UTC+3)	Tavakoli 3'; Javid 7'; Esmaeilpour 10'; Ahmadabbasi 39'	Report (FIFA)	Gonzalez 3', 36'	Stadium: Avia Solutions Group Arena

September 20, 2021 FIFA Futsal World Cup GS Group F	United States	0–7; Source (FIFA)	Serbia	Klaipėda, Lithuania
20:00 EEST (UTC+3)		Report (FIFA)	Rakić 6'; Tomić 8', 17'; Petrov 20'; Milosavljević 32'; Lazarević 33'; Radovanović 38'	Stadium: Švyturys Arena

== Players ==
=== Current squad ===
The following players were called up to the squad for the 2024 CONCACAF Futsal Championship. The team played group stage matches against Trinidad and Tobago on 13 April, Dominican Republic on 14 April, and Guatemala on 15 April, as well as a quarter-final match against Panama on April 17.
Caps and goals updated as of 2 April 2024.

No.	Pos.	Player	Date of birth (age)	Caps	Goals	Club
1	GK	Robert Damron	25 March 2002 (age 24)	4	0	(United States Soccer Federation) Michigan Futsal Factory
12	GK	Diego Moretti (captain)	8 September 1982 (age 43)	18	0	Unattached
5	DF	Luciano González	4 November 1994 (age 31)	16	7	(Italian Football Federation) Sammichele 1992
9	DF	Raphael Araujo	18 September 1985 (age 40)	17	4	(United States Soccer Federation) St. Louis Ambush
14	DF	Erik Macias	21 September 1996 (age 29)	5	0	(United States Soccer Federation) Texas Outlaws
3	MF	Nilton De Andrade	20 March 1996 (age 30)	0	0	(United States Soccer Federation) Utica City FC
4	MF	Alencar Ventura-Junior	7 October 1992 (age 33)	15	1	(United States Soccer Federation) Safira Futsal
6	MF	Sebastian Méndez	6 March 2001 (age 25)	6	0	(United States Soccer Federation) Texas Outlaws
7	MF	Diego Burato	10 September 1988 (age 37)	4	2	Unattached
10	MF	David Ortiz	20 September 2000 (age 25)	9	2	(United States Soccer Federation) Texas Outlaws
13	MF	Nicholas López	19 June 2002 (age 24)	0	0	(Italian Football Federation) Ciampino Futsal
2	FW	Manuel de Andrade		5	1	(United States Soccer Federation) Brockton FC United
8	FW	Franck Tayou	16 April 1990 (age 36)	5	1	(United States Soccer Federation) St. Louis Ambush
11	FW	Luiz Morales	23 October 1999 (age 26)	4	5	(United States Soccer Federation) Texas Outlaws

== All-time record ==
Until to 05/05/2016.

Year	Pld	W	D	L	GS	GA	Dif	Pts
1986	0	0	0	0	0	0	0	0
1987	0	0	0	0	0	0	0	0
1988	0	0	0	0	0	0	0	0
1989	0	0	0	0	0	0	0	0
1990	0	0	0	0	0	0	0	0
1991	0	0	0	0	0	0	0	0
1992	0	0	0	0	0	0	0	0
1993	0	0	0	0	0	0	0	0
1994	0	0	0	0	0	0	0	0
1995	0	0	0	0	0	0	0	0
1996	0	0	0	0	0	0	0	0
1997	Did not play							
1998	Did not play							
1999	0	0	0	0	0	0	0	0
2000	0	0	0	0	0	0	0	0
2001	0	0	0	0	0	0	0	0
2002	0	0	0	0	0	0	0	0
2003	0	0	0	0	0	0	0	0
2004	0	0	0	0	0	0	0	0
2005	0	0	0	0	0	0	0	0
2006	0	0	0	0	0	0	0	0
2007	0	0	0	0	0	0	0	0
2008	0	0	0	0	0	0	0	0
2009	0	0	0	0	0	0	0	0
2010	0	0	0	0	0	0	0	0
2011	0	0	0	0	0	0	0	0
2012	0	0	0	0	0	0	0	0
2013	0	0	0	0	0	0	0	0
2014	0	0	0	0	0	0	0	0
2015	0	0	0	0	0	0	0	0
2016	Did not play							
2017	0	0	0	0	0	0	0	0
2018	0	0	0	0	0	0	0	0
2019	0	0	0	0	0	0	0	0
2020	0	0	0	0	0	0	0	0
2021	0	0	0	0	0	0	0	0
Total	138	52	20	66	413	481	-68	0

http://www.futsalplanet.com/matches/index.asp http://theroonba.com/

== Results ==
Number	Year	Opponent	Result
1	1986	Netherlands	1–4 L
2	1986	Brazil	4–5 L
159	2021	Costa Rica	2–3 L

== See also ==
- United States Futsal Federation
- Futsal in the United States
- United States women's national futsal team
