= Dominican Republic national futsal team =

Dominican Republic
- Nickname(s): Los Quisqueyanos (The Quisqueyanos)
- Association: Federación Dominicana de Fútbol
- Confederation: CONCACAF
- FIFA code: DOM
- FIFA ranking: 114 ▲1 (8 May 2026)
Home colours	Away colours

First international
- Dominican Republic 6–3 Haiti (Santo Domingo, Dominican Republic; 1 February 2014)

Biggest win
- Trinidad and Tobago 0–10 Dominican Republic (Managua, Nicaragua; 15 April 2024)

Biggest defeat
- Dominican Republic 0–8 Paraguay (Valledupar, Colombia; 25 June 2022); Dominican Republic 0–8 El Salvador (Valledupar, Colombia; 27 June 2022)

CONCACAF Futsal Championship
- Appearances: 2 (First in 2021)
- Best result: Quarter-finals (2021, 2024)

The Dominican Republic national futsal team is controlled by the Dominican Football Federation, the governing body for football in Dominican Republic and represents the country in international futsal competitions, such as the World Cup and the CONCACAF Championships.

== Tournaments ==
=== FIFA Futsal World Cup ===
- 1989 to 2016 – did not enter
- 2021 – did not qualify
- 2024 – did not qualify

=== CONCACAF Futsal Championship ===
- 1996 to 2016 – did not enter
- 2021 – Quarter-finals
- 2024 – Quarter-finals
