= Guatemala national futsal team =

National sports team

Guatemala
- Shirt badge/Association crest
- Nickname(s): La Azul y Blanco; Los Chapines; La Bicolor; La Furia Azul
- Association: Federación Nacional de Fútbol
- Confederation: CONCACAF (North America)
- Head coach: Estuardo De León
- Home stadium: Domo Polideportivo
- FIFA code: GUA
- FIFA ranking: 44 (24 September 2026)
Home colours	Away colours

First international
- Guatemala 2–8 Mexico (Guatemala City, Guatemala; 30 August 1996)

Biggest win
- Guatemala 13–2 Nicaragua (Guatemala City, Guatemala; 27 January 2016)

Biggest defeat
- Guatemala 2–29 Brazil (Guatemala City, Guatemala; 23 November 2000)

FIFA World Cup
- Appearances: 6 (First in 2000)
- Best result: First round (2000, 2008, 2012, 2016, 2021, 2024)

CONCACAF Futsal Championship
- Appearances: 4 (First in 1996)
- Best result: (gold) Champions (2008)

Confederations Cup
- Appearances: 2 (First in 2009)
- Best result: 4th place (2009)

Grand Prix de Futsal
- Appearances: 6 (First in 2009)
- Best result: 4th place (2014)

The Guatemala national futsal team represents Guatemala in international futsal competitions, such as the World Cup and the CONCACAF Championships, and is governed by the Federación Nacional de Fútbol.

The Guatemalan futsal team was the host team of the FIFA Futsal World Cup in 2000 when it was held in Guatemala. It was the 4th Futsal World Cup held under FIFA. This world event launched the national squad and is seen as what catapulted Guatemala in the sport.

The Guatemalan team has participated in four FIFA Futsal World Cups.

Guatemala was the CONCACAF champion in 2008. Their home games are held in the Domo Polideportivo in Zone 13 in Guatemala City. Their best match was a 13–2 victory over Nicaragua in 2016. In late February, it was announced that Spaniard and experienced Tomas De Dios Lopez would become the new national head coach. Days later, in a press conference, the news were made official as well as a new kit deal with Joma that replaced Umbro.

== Results and fixtures ==
The following is a list of match results in the last 12 months, as well as any future matches that have been scheduled.

== Competitive record ==
=== FIFA Futsal World Cup ===
FIFA Futsal World Cup record
Year	Round	Pld	W	D	L	GS	GA
(Netherlands) 1989	Did not enter						
(Hong Kong) 1992	Did not enter						
(Spain) 1996	Did not enter						
(Guatemala) 2000	1st round	3	1	0	2	10	40
(Chinese Taipei) 2004	Did not enter						
(Brazil) 2008	Group stage	4	2	0	2	14	9
(Thailand) 2012	Group stage	3	1	0	2	8	15
(Colombia) 2016	Group stage	3	0	0	3	7	10
(Lithuania) 2021	Group stage	3	1	0	2	9	14
(Uzbekistan) 2024	Group stage	3	0	0	3	10	22
Total	6/10	19	5	0	14	58	110

=== CONCACAF Futsal Championship ===
- 1996 – 4th place (host)
- 2000 – Did not qualify
- 2004 – Did not enter
- 2008 – (gold) Champions (host)
- 2012 – (silver) 2nd place (host)
- 2016 – (bronze) 3rd place
- 2021 – (bronze) 3rd place
- 2024 – (bronze) 3rd place

=== Grand Prix de Futsal ===
- 2005 – Did not enter
- 2006 – Did not enter
- 2007 – Did not enter
- 2008 – Did not enter
- 2009 – 7th place
- 2010 – 11th place
- 2011 – 5th place
- 2013 – 6th place
- 2014 – 4th place
- 2015 – 6th place
- 2017 – TBD

=== Futsal Confederations Cup ===
- 2009 – 4th place
- 2013 – Did not enter
- 2014 – 8th place

=== Futsal at the Pan American Games ===
- 2007 – 7th place
