= 2008 CONCACAF Futsal Championship =

Tournament details
- Host country: Guatemala
- Dates: 3–8 June
- Teams: 8 (from 1 confederation)
- Venue: 1 (in 1 host city)

Final positions
- Champions: Guatemala (1st title)
- Runners-up: Cuba
- Third place: United States
- Fourth place: Panama

Tournament statistics
- Matches played: 16
- Goals scored: 112 (7 per match)

The 2008 CONCACAF Futsal Championship was the fourth edition of the main international futsal tournament of the North and Central America and the Caribbean region. It took place in Guatemala City, Guatemala from 3 to 8 June 2008, with the Domo Polideportivo de la CDAG as the only venue.

Hosts Guatemala won the tournament after defeating the United States in semifinals and Cuba in the final. It was the first international futsal title won by Guatemala.

The tournament also acted as a qualifying tournament for the 2008 FIFA Futsal World Cup in Brazil, with second and third placed teams Cuba and the U.S. joining Guatemala as the qualified teams.

== Qualifying ==
Qualifying to 2008 CONCACAF Futsal Championship took place in Macoya, Trinidad and Tobago from 3–6 April 2008. and all matches played in Canedo Hall in the Centre of Excellence, Port of Spain.

=== Group A ===
Team	Pld	W	D	L	GF	GA	GD	Pts
Trinidad and Tobago	2	2	0	0	14	3	+11	6
Suriname	2	1	0	1	18	10	+8	3
Puerto Rico	2	0	0	2	3	22	-19	0

2008-04-03
19:00

Trinidad and Tobago	7 - 0	Puerto Rico

Canedo Hall
Macoya, Trinidad and Tobago
2008-04-04
19:00

Puerto Rico	3 - 15	Suriname

Canedo Hall
Macoya, Trinidad and Tobago
2008-04-05
18:00

Trinidad and Tobago	7 - 3	Suriname

Canedo Hall
Macoya, Trinidad and Tobago

=== Group B ===
Team	Pld	W	D	L	GF	GA	GD	Pts
Haiti	2	2	0	0	31	3	+28	6
Guyana	2	1	0	1	10	14	-4	3
Sint Maarten	2	0	0	2	3	27	-24	0

2008-04-03
17:00

Guyana	8 - 2	Sint Maarten

Macoya, Trinidad and Tobago
2008-04-04
17:00

Guyana	2 - 12	Haiti

Canedo Hall
Macoya, Trinidad and Tobago
2008-04-05
16:00

Haiti	19 - 1	Sint Maarten

Canedo Hall
Macoya, Trinidad and Tobago

=== Third & Fourth Places ===
2008-04-06
16:00

Suriname	7 - 3	Guyana

Canedo Hall
Macoya, Trinidad and Tobago

=== Final ===
2008-04-06
18:00

Trinidad and Tobago	6 - 3	Haiti

Canedo Hall
Macoya, Trinidad and Tobago

=== Final standing ===
1. Trinidad and Tobago *
2. Haiti *
3. Suriname
4. Guyana
5. Puerto Rico
6. Sint Maarten

* Qualified to 2008 CONCACAF Futsal Championship

== Championship ==
The eight participating teams are divided into two groups of four which will play each on a single round-robin format. The top two teams of each group advance to semi-finals. The top three teams for the tournament will earn participation at the 2008 Futsal World Cup.

=== Group A ===
Team	Pld	W	D	L	GF	GA	GD	Pts
Cuba	3	1	2	0	14	7	+7	5
Guatemala	3	1	2	0	11	6	+5	5
Mexico	3	1	2	0	12	8	+4	5
Trinidad and Tobago	3	0	0	3	5	21	-16	0

2008-06-03
18:00

Cuba	2 – 2	Mexico

2008-06-03
20:00

Guatemala	5 – 0	Trinidad and Tobago

2008-06-04
18:00

Trinidad and Tobago	2 – 9	Cuba

2008-06-04
20:00

Guatemala	3 – 3	Mexico

2008-06-05
18:00

Mexico	7 – 3	Trinidad and Tobago

2008-06-05
20:00

Guatemala	3 – 3	Cuba

=== Group B ===
Team	Pld	W	D	L	GF	GA	GD	Pts
United States	3	2	1	0	12	6	+6	7
Panama	3	1	2	0	11	7	+4	5
Costa Rica	3	1	1	1	21	12	+9	4
Haiti	3	0	0	3	3	22	-19	0

2008-06-03
10:00

Costa Rica	6 - 6	Panama

2008-06-03
12:00

United States	5 - 3	Haiti

2008-06-04
10:00

Haiti	0 - 13	Costa Rica

2008-06-04
12:00

Panama	1 - 1	United States

2008-06-05
10:00

Panama	4 - 0	Haiti

2008-06-05
12:00

United States	6 - 2	Costa Rica

== Knockout stage ==
Semi-finals
7 June 2008 – Guatemala City
United States	0
Guatemala	4
7 June 2008 – Guatemala City
Cuba	4
Panama	1

Final
8 June 2008 – Guatemala City
Guatemala (pen.)	3 (5)
Cuba	3 (3)
Third place
8 June 2008 – Guatemala City
United States	7
Panama	1

=== Semifinal ===
2008-06-07
14:00

United States	0 - 4	Guatemala

2008-06-07
16:00

Cuba	4 - 1	Panama

=== 3rd place ===
2008-06-08
14:00

United States	7 - 1	Panama

=== Final ===
2008-06-08
16:00

Guatemala	3 – 3 (a.e.t.) (5 – 3 pen.)	Cuba

== Winner ==
2008 CONCACAF champion

Guatemala
First title

== Final standing ==
Place	Team
1	Guatemala
2	Cuba
3	United States
4	Panama
5	Mexico
6	Costa Rica
7	Trinidad and Tobago
8	Haiti

Team qualified for the 2008 FIFA Futsal World Cup
