= Jameel Neptune =

Trinidadian footballer (born 1993)

Personal information
- Date of birth: 19 July 1993 (age 33)
- Place of birth: Trinidad and Tobago
- Positions: Defender; midfielder

Senior career*
Years	Team	Apps	(Gls)
- Malabar FC
–2016/17	Morvant Caledonia United		(5)
2017	North East Stars		(3)
2018–	Central		(2+)

International career
2018–	Trinidad and Tobago	2	(0)
- * Club domestic league appearances and goals

Jameel Neptune (born 19 July 1993) is a Trinidadian professional footballer who plays as both defender and midfielder for Central.

== Career ==
After playing for Trinidadian lower league side Malabar, Neptune signed for Morvant Caledonia United in the top flight. However, his quality of training was affected by the fact that the club had no designated training ground.

As of 2018, he has made 2 appearances for the Trinidad and Tobago national team.

In 2021, he participated in the 2021 CONCACAF Futsal Championship with the Trinidad and Tobago national futsal team.
