= Amadeu Teixeira Arena =

Indoor sporting arena in Manaus, Brazil

Coordinates: 3.081043°S 60.027602°W

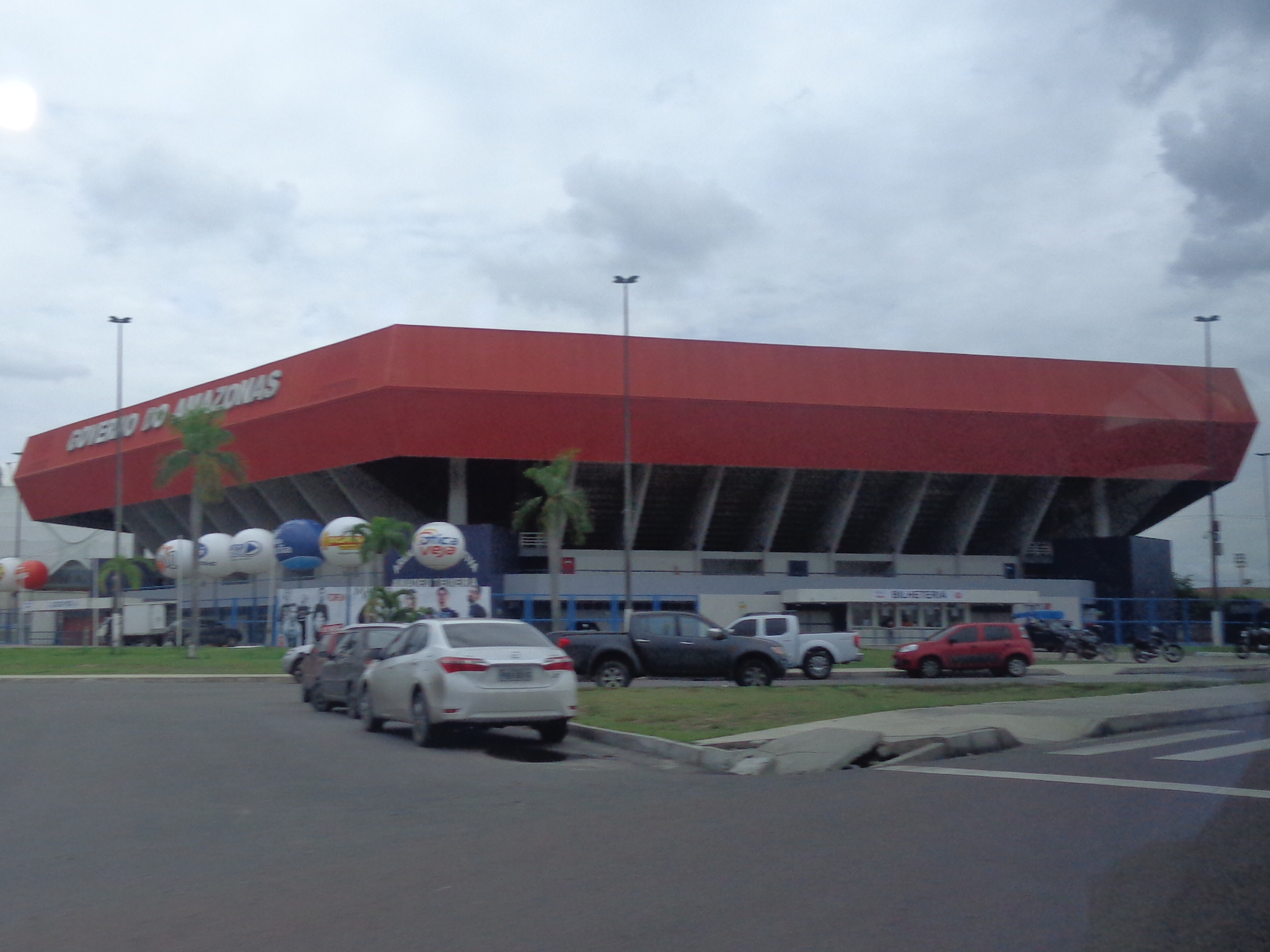
- Amadeu Teixeira Arena
- Interactive map of Amadeu Teixeira Arena
- Full name: Arena Poliesportiva Amadeu Teixeira
- Location: Manaus, Brazil
- Capacity: 10,201

Construction
- Opened: 2006

Arena Poliesportiva Amadeu Teixeira is an indoor sporting arena used mostly for futsal and volleyball located in Manaus, Brazil. The capacity of the arena is 11,800 spectators and opened in 2006. The venue is used for numerous events, like basketball, concerts, futsal, handball, volleyball and fight sports.

== See also ==
- List of indoor arenas in Brazil
