= Matthew Woo Ling =

Trinidad and Tobago footballer

Personal information
- Date of birth: 15 September 1996 (age 30)
- Place of birth: Port of Spain, Trinidad
- Height: 1.75 m (5 ft 9 in)
- Position: Midfielder

Team information
- Current team: Vere United F.C.

Youth career
- –2013: W Connection
- 2013–2015: St Anthony's College

College career
Years	Team	Apps	(Gls)
2017	Iowa Western Reivers	11	(4)

Senior career*
Years	Team	Apps	(Gls)
2017	Peachtree City MOBA	12	(2)
2018–2019	St. Andrews	19	(3)
2019–2020	North East Stars		
2020–2022	Miami United		
2022	Dalvík/Reynir	20	(2)
2023–2024	Miami United		
2024 -	Vere United F.C.	0	(0)

International career^{‡}
2012–2013	Trinidad and Tobago U17	4	(1)
2015	Trinidad and Tobago U20	2	(0)
2019–	Trinidad and Tobago	4	(0)
- * Club domestic league appearances and goals as of 14:45, 9 August 2022 (UTC) ‡ National team caps and goals as of 14:45, 9 August 2022 (UTC)

Matthew Woo Ling (born 15 September 1996) is a Trinidadian footballer who plays as a midfielder for Vere United F.C.

== Club career ==
Woo Ling is a well travelled footballer with stops in the Caribbean, Europe and North America. As of September 2024, he plays for Vere United F.C. in the Jamaica Premier League.

== Career statistics ==
=== Club ===
As of 1 February 2021.

Club	Season	League			Cup		Other		Total	
Club	Season	Division	Apps	Goals	Apps	Goals	Apps	Goals	Apps	Goals
Peachtree City MOBA	2017	PDL	12	2	0	0	0	0	12	2
St. Andrews	2018–19	Maltese Premier League	19	3	0	0	1 (Note: Appearances in the relegation play-offs)	0	20	3
Career total			31	5	0	0	1	0	32	5

=== International ===
As of matches played 9 August 2022

National team	Year	Apps	Goals
Trinidad and Tobago	2019	2	0
Trinidad and Tobago	2020	0	0
Trinidad and Tobago	2021	1	0
Trinidad and Tobago	2022	1	0
Total		4	0
