= 2000 CONCACAF Futsal Championship =

2nd edition of the CONCACAF Futsal Championship

Campeonato de Futsal de CONCACAF 2000

Tournament details
- Host country: Costa Rica
- City: San José
- Dates: 20–29 July
- Teams: 8 (from 1 confederation)
- Venue: Gimnasio Nacional Eddy Cortés

Final positions
- Champions: Costa Rica (1st title)
- Runners-up: Cuba
- Third place: United States
- Fourth place: Mexico

Tournament statistics
- Matches played: 16
- Goals scored: 119 (7.44 per match)

The 2000 CONCACAF Futsal Championship was the 2nd edition of the CONCACAF Futsal Championship, the quadrennial international futsal championship organised by CONCACAF for the men's national teams of the North, Central American and Caribbean regions. The tournament was held in San José, Costa Rica between 20 and 29 July 2000.

As with the previous edition, the tournament acted as the CONCACAF qualifiers for the FIFA Futsal World Cup. The top two teams of the tournament, Costa Rica and Cuba, qualified for the 2000 FIFA Futsal World Cup in Guatemala as the CONCACAF representatives.

== Teams ==
CONCACAF announced that 8 teams will play in the tournament.

Team	Appearance	Previous best performance	Previous FIFA Futsal World Cup appearances
Costa Rica (hosts)	2nd	Group Stage (1996)	1992
Cuba	2nd	Second place (1996)	1996
Mexico	2nd	Third place (1996)	
United States (title holders)	2nd	Champions (**1996**)	1989, 1992, 1996
Puerto Rico	1st		
Netherlands Antilles	1st		
Suriname	1st		
Nicaragua	1st		

Bold indicates champions. Italic indicates host.

== Group stage ==
The top two teams of each group advance to the semi-finals.

=== Group A ===
Pos	Team	Pld	W	D	L	GF	GA	GD	Pts	Qualification
1	Costa Rica (H)	3	3	0	0	19	6	+13	**9**	Semi-finals
2	Cuba	3	2	0	1	24	10	+14	**6**	Semi-finals
3	Suriname	3	1	0	2	18	22	−4	**3**	
4	Nicaragua	3	0	0	3	7	30	−23	**0**	

Source: FutsalPlanet
(H) Hosts
20 July 2000

Cuba	13–4	Suriname

Gimnasio Nacional Eddy Cortés, San José
20 July 2000

Costa Rica	10–1	Nicaragua

Gimnasio Nacional Eddy Cortés, San José

22 July 2000

Suriname	3–5	Costa Rica

Gimnasio Nacional Eddy Cortés, San José
22 July 2000

Cuba	9–2	Nicaragua

Gimnasio Nacional Eddy Cortés, San José

24 July 2000

Nicaragua	4–11	Suriname

Gimnasio Nacional Eddy Cortés, San José
24 July 2000

Costa Rica	4–2	Cuba

Gimnasio Nacional Eddy Cortés, San José

=== Group B ===
Pos	Team	Pld	W	D	L	GF	GA	GD	Pts	Qualification
1	United States	3	3	0	0	15	2	+13	**9**	Semi-finals
2	Mexico	3	2	0	1	10	6	+4	**6**	Semi-finals
3	Netherlands Antilles	3	1	0	2	5	11	−6	**3**	
4	Puerto Rico	3	0	0	3	2	13	−11	**0**	

Source: FutsalPlanet
21 July 2000

Mexico	4–1	Netherlands Antilles

Gimnasio Nacional Eddy Cortés, San José
21 July 2000

United States	5–0	Puerto Rico

Gimnasio Nacional Eddy Cortés, San José

23 July 2000

Mexico	4–2	Puerto Rico

Gimnasio Nacional Eddy Cortés, San José
23 July 2000

Netherlands Antilles	0–7	United States

Gimnasio Nacional Eddy Cortés, San José

25 July 2000

Puerto Rico	0–4	Netherlands Antilles

Gimnasio Nacional Eddy Cortés, San José
25 July 2000

United States	3–2	Mexico

Gimnasio Nacional Eddy Cortés, San José

== Knockout stage ==
In the knockout stage, extra time and penalty shoot-out are used to decide the winner if necessary.

=== Bracket ===
Semi-finals
5 September
United States	2
**Cuba**	**4**
5 September
**Costa Rica**	**3**
Mexico	2

Final
7 September
Cuba	0
**Costa Rica**	**2**
Third place match
7 September
**United States**	**5**
Mexico	1

=== Semi-finals ===
Winners qualify for 2000 FIFA Futsal World Cup.

27 July 2000

United States	2–4	Cuba

Gimnasio Nacional Eddy Cortés, San José
27 July 2000

Costa Rica	3–2	Mexico

Gimnasio Nacional Eddy Cortés, San José

=== Third place match ===
29 July 2000

United States	5–1	Mexico

Gimnasio Nacional Eddy Cortés, San José

=== Final ===
29 July 2000

Cuba	0–2	Costa Rica

Gimnasio Nacional Eddy Cortés, San José

== Qualified teams for FIFA Futsal World Cup ==
The following two teams from CONCACAF qualified for the 2000 FIFA Futsal World Cup on 27 July 2000.

Team	Previous appearances in FIFA Futsal World Cup
Costa Rica	1 (1992)
Cuba	1 (1996)
