= Nilton De Andrade =

Cape Verdean-born American soccer and futsal player (born 1996)

Nilton de Andrade
Personal information
- Full name: Nilton Teixeira de Andrade
- Date of birth: March 20, 1996 (age 30)
- Place of birth: Fogo, Cape Verde
- Position: Forward

Team information
- Current team: Utica City FC
- Number: 10

College career
Years	Team	Apps	(Gls)
2016–2017	Newbury Nighthawks		
2019–2021	UMass Boston Beacons	39	(32)

Senior career*
Years	Team	Apps	(Gls)
2020–	Brockton FC United		
2022–	Utica City FC (indoor)	22	(12)

International career
2024–	United States (futsal)		(2)
- * Club domestic league appearances and goals

Nilton Teixeira de Andrade (born March 20, 1996) is a Cape Verdean-born American soccer and futsal player who plays as a forward for Utica City FC in the Major Arena Soccer League (MASL) and for Brockton FC United in the United Premier Soccer League (UPSL). He played college soccer at Newbury College and the University of Massachusetts Boston, earning United Soccer Coaches First Team All-American honors in 2021. De Andrade also represents the United States in international futsal.

== Early life ==
De Andrade was born on the island of Fogo, Cape Verde, and moved to Boston, Massachusetts, as a teenager.

== College career ==
De Andrade began his collegiate career at Newbury College in 2016. He earned New England Collegiate Conference Rookie of the Year honors and was named to the All-Conference First Team in both seasons.

After Newbury College announced its closure, he transferred to the University of Massachusetts Boston. In 2019, he finished with 12 goals and 8 assists and was named a United Soccer Coaches All-American.

In 2021, he led the Little East Conference in goals, points, and game-winning goals and became the program’s first First Team All-American. He finished his Beacons career with 32 goals and 17 assists in 39 appearances.

== Club career ==
=== Brockton FC United ===
De Andrade joined Brockton FC United during the 2020–21 UPSL season. He helped the club win the UPSL East Region title and advance to the national semifinals, scoring twice in the regional final against NY Contour United.

He made his U.S. Open Cup debut in the 2022 first round against Western Mass Pioneers.

=== Utica City FC ===
De Andrade signed with Utica City FC ahead of the 2022–23 MASL season. He recorded 12 goals and 10 assists in 22 matches during his rookie season.

In the 2023–24 campaign, he scored 26 goals and added 15 assists and was named Utica City FC’s Most Valuable Player. A club feature noted his dribbling, movement, and community involvement.

== International futsal career ==
De Andrade was first invited to training camps for the United States futsal national team in 2021.

He made his international debut at the 2024 CONCACAF Futsal Championship, scoring twice in a 7–4 win over Trinidad and Tobago.

== Style of play ==
De Andrade plays primarily as an attacking midfielder or forward. He is known for close control, quick movement, and creating scoring chances in tight spaces.

== Personal life ==
According to his UMass Boston biography, he is the son of Jaime de Andrade and has four brothers. He majored in criminal justice.

== Honours ==
=== College ===
- United Soccer Coaches First Team All-American: 2021
- United Soccer Coaches Third Team All-American: 2019
- Little East Conference Offensive Player of the Year: 2021
- NECC Rookie of the Year: 2016

=== Club ===
- UPSL East Region Champion: 2021 (Brockton FC United)
- UPSL National Semifinalist: 2021 (Brockton FC United)

=== Individual ===
- Utica City FC Most Valuable Player: 2023–24
