= Vangelino Sastromedjo =

Surinamese footballer

Personal information
- Full name: Vangellino L. Sastromedjo
- Date of birth: 25 March 1984 (age 42)
- Place of birth: Paramaribo, Suriname
- Height: 1.71 m (5 ft 7 in)
- Position: Midfielder

Team information
- Current team: Real Poerwo

Senior career*
Years	Team	Apps	(Gls)
2006–2008f	Leo Victor		
2008–2009	FCS Nacional		
2009–2018	WBC		
2018–2022	Bintang Lahir		
2022–	Real Poerwo		

International career
2006–2015	Suriname	19	(2)
2020–	Suriname Futsal	5	(4)
- * Club domestic league appearances and goals

Vangelino L. Sastromedjo (born 25 March 1984) is a Surinamese professional footballer who plays as a midfielder for LSB club Real Poerwo. He also plays futsal for Z.V. Osreng and the Suriname national futsal team.

Formerly an international for Suriname, Sastromedjo has represented his country in eleven FIFA World Cup qualification matches. He is of Javanese descent.

== International career ==
Sastromedjo scored 2 goals in 19 games for the Suriname national football team. In 2015 he went on to captain Suriname in their efforts to qualify for the World Cup. He played both home and away matches against Nicaragua.

=== International goals ===
Suriname score listed first, score column indicates score after each Sastromedjo goal.

List of international goals scored by Vangellino Sastromedjo
No.	Cap	Date	Venue	Opponent	Score	Result	Competition	Ref.
1	1	12 November 2006	Stade Pierre-Aliker, Fort-de-France, Martinique	Haiti	1–0	1–1	2007 Caribbean Cup	
2	6	10 August 2008	Providence Stadium, Providence, Guyana	Guyana	1–0	1–1	2008 Caribbean Cup qualification	

== Honours ==
=== Club ===
WBC

- SVB Hoofdklasse: 2008–09
- SVB Cup: 2008–09
- Suriname President's Cup: 2009

=== Futsal ===
S.C.V. LINCO

- SZVB Hoofdklasse: 2011

The Lions

- SZVB Hoofdklasse: 2020
