= 2008 FIFA Futsal World Cup =

Copa do Mundo de Futsal da FIFA Brasil 2008

Tournament details
- Host country: Brazil
- Dates: 30 September – 19 October
- Teams: 20 (from 6 confederations)
- Venues: 2 (in 2 host cities)

Final positions
- Champions: Brazil (4th title)
- Runners-up: Spain
- Third place: Italy
- Fourth place: Russia

Tournament statistics
- Matches played: 56
- Goals scored: 387 (6.91 per match)
- Attendance: 292,161 (5,217 per match)
- Top scorer: (Russia) Pula (16 goals)
- Best player: (Brazil) Falcão
- Best goalkeeper: (Brazil) Tiago
- Fair play award: Spain

The 2008 FIFA Futsal World Cup was the sixth edition of the FIFA Futsal World Cup, the quadrennial international futsal championship contested by the men's national teams of the member associations of FIFA. It was the first tournament to use the term "World Cup". It was held between 30 September and 19 October 2008 in Brazil. It was the only Futsal World Cup to feature 20 teams.

Brazil won the tournament for the fourth time. It was their first title since 1996.

== Qualifying criteria ==
=== Qualified nations ===
Competition	Date	Venue	Berths	Qualified
Host Nation			1	Brazil
2008 AFC Futsal Championship	11–18 May 2008	Thailand	4	Iran; Thailand; Japan; China
2008 African Futsal Championship	21–30 March 2008	Libya	2	Libya; Egypt
2008 CONCACAF Futsal Championship	2–8 June 2008	Guatemala	3	Guatemala; Cuba; United States
2008 Copa América de Futsal	23–28 June 2008	Uruguay	3	Uruguay; Argentina; Paraguay
2008 Oceanian Futsal Championship	8–14 June 2008	Fiji	1	Solomon Islands
UEFA Preliminary Competition	23 February – 16 April 2008	Groups	6	Spain; Portugal; Italy; Russia; Ukraine; Czech Republic
TOTAL			20	—

== Venues ==
Arena	Maracanã Arena	Nilson Nelson Gymnasium
Picture	Ginásio do Maracanãzinho	Ginásio Nilson Nelson
City	Rio de Janeiro	Brasília
Capacity	12,105	11,160
2008 FIFA Futsal World Cup is located in Brazil

== Squads ==
Each nation submitted a squad of 14 players, including two goalkeepers.

== Officials ==
Confederation	Referees
AFC	(Kyrgyzstan) Nurdin Bukuev
AFC	(Japan) Kazuya Isokawa
AFC	(Malaysia) Badrul Hisham Kalam
AFC	(Australia) Scott Kidson
AFC	(South Korea) Kim Jang-Kwan
AFC	(China) Li Zhizhong
AFC	(Iran) Alireza Sohrabi
CAF	(Libya) Tawfik Al-Dawi
CAF	(Egypt) Saiud Abdul-Kader
CAF	(Mozambique) Asselam Khan
CONCACAF	(Guatemala) Carlos del Cid
CONCACAF	(Cuba) Antonio Alvarez Betancourt
CONCACAF	(United States) Jason Krnac
CONCACAF	(Costa Rica) Hector Mesen
CONCACAF	(Panama) Elix Peralta
OFC	(Fiji) Amitesh Chandra Behari

Confederation	Referees
CONMEBOL	(Venezuela) Octalivar Hernández
CONMEBOL	(Argentina) Sergio Ghibaudi
CONMEBOL	(Brazil) Tales Goulart
CONMEBOL	(Ecuador) Franklin Loor
CONMEBOL	(Colombia) Fabián López
CONMEBOL	(Peru) Héctor Rojas Figueroa
CONMEBOL	(Uruguay) Álvaro Sacarelo
CONMEBOL	(Paraguay) Nestor Fabian Valiente Ibarra
UEFA	(Italy) Massimo Cumbo
UEFA	(Portugal) António Cardoso
UEFA	(Spain) Roberto Gracia Marin
UEFA	(Czech Republic) Karel Henych
UEFA	(Ukraine) Oleg Ivanov
UEFA	(Russia) Ivan Shabanov
UEFA	(Croatia) Edi Sunjic
UEFA	(Hungary) Károly Török

== First round ==
=== Draw ===
The 20 teams were divided in four groups, each group with five teams. The draw was held on 10 July 2008 in Brasília, Brazil

=== Tie break rule ===
In case two or more teams are equal on points, their ranking is determined by the results of matches between the tied teams only. If there is still a tie after this, the ranking is determined by goals difference in all group matches.

=== Group A ===
Team	Pld	W	D	L	GF	GA	GD	Pts
Brazil (H)	4	4	0	0	49	1	+48	12
Russia	4	3	0	1	50	15	+35	9
Japan	4	2	0	2	13	24	−11	6
Cuba	4	1	0	3	16	25	−9	3
Solomon Islands	4	0	0	4	6	69	−63	0

(H) Hosts

Brazil	12–1	Japan
Cuba	10–2	Solomon Islands
Solomon Islands	0–21	Brazil
Russia	10–5	Cuba
Brazil	7–0	Russia
Japan	7–2	Solomon Islands
Japan	4–1	Cuba
Russia	31–2	Solomon Islands
Brazil	9–0	Cuba
Russia	9–1	Japan

=== Group B ===
Team	Pld	W	D	L	GF	GA	GD	Pts
Paraguay	4	3	0	1	19	5	+14	9 (Note: The ranking between the top three teams was determined by the results of matches between them.)
Italy	4	3	0	1	12	6	+6	9
Portugal	4	3	0	1	15	8	+7	9
Thailand	4	1	0	3	7	15	−8	3
United States	4	0	0	4	5	24	−19	0

Notes:

Italy	1–0	Thailand
Paraguay	5–0	United States
Portugal	3–2	Paraguay
United States	1–6	Italy
Thailand	5–3	United States
Italy	3–1	Portugal
Portugal	8–1	United States
Thailand	0–8	Paraguay
Italy	2–4	Paraguay
Portugal	3–2	Thailand

=== Group C ===
Team	Pld	W	D	L	GF	GA	GD	Pts
Ukraine	4	3	1	0	17	7	+10	10
Argentina	4	3	1	0	13	5	+8	10
Guatemala	4	2	0	2	14	9	+5	6
Egypt	4	1	0	3	9	12	−3	3
China	4	0	0	4	5	25	−20	0

Guatemala	1–0	Egypt
Argentina	5–0	China
Egypt	2–4	Argentina
Ukraine	6–2	Guatemala
China	2–6	Egypt
Argentina	2–2	Ukraine
China	1–10	Guatemala
Ukraine	5–1	Egypt
Argentina	2–1	Guatemala
Ukraine	4–2	China

=== Group D ===
Team	Pld	W	D	L	GF	GA	GD	Pts
Spain	4	3	1	0	13	3	+10	10
Iran	4	3	1	0	14	9	+5	10
Czech Republic	4	2	0	2	10	10	0	6
Libya	4	0	1	3	7	14	−7	1
Uruguay	4	0	1	3	6	14	−8	1

Spain	3–3	Iran
Uruguay	3–3	Libya
Libya	0–3	Spain
Czech Republic	4–1	Uruguay
Spain	4–0	Czech Republic
Iran	4–2	Libya
Czech Republic	4–2	Libya
Iran	4–2	Uruguay
Spain	3–0	Uruguay
Czech Republic	2–3	Iran

== Second round ==
=== Group E ===
Team	Pld	W	D	L	GF	GA	GD	Pts
Brazil	3	3	0	0	9	3	+6	9
Italy	3	1	1	1	9	8	+1	4
Iran	3	1	1	1	10	10	0	4
Ukraine	3	0	0	3	7	14	−7	0

Brazil	1–0	Iran
Ukraine	0–4	Italy
Italy	0–3	Brazil
Ukraine	4–5	Iran
Brazil	5–3	Ukraine
Iran	5–5	Italy

=== Group F ===
Team	Pld	W	D	L	GF	GA	GD	Pts
Spain	3	3	0	0	11	4	+7	9
Russia	3	1	1	1	9	11	−2	4
Argentina	3	0	2	1	6	7	−1	2
Paraguay	3	0	1	2	8	12	−4	1

Paraguay	3–3	Argentina
Spain	5–2	Russia
Spain	2–1	Argentina
Russia	5–4	Paraguay
Argentina	2–2	Russia
Paraguay	1–4	Spain

== Final round ==
Semi-finals
16 October 2008 – Rio de Janeiro
Russia	2
Brazil	4
16 October 2008 – Rio de Janeiro
Spain (a.e.t.)	3
Italy	2

Final
19 October 2008 – Rio de Janeiro
Brazil (pen.)	2 (4)
Spain	2 (3)
Third place
18 October 2008 – Rio de Janeiro
Russia	1
Italy	2

=== Semi-finals ===
16 October

Russia	2–4	Brazil

Rio de Janeiro
16 October

Spain	3–2	Italy

Rio de Janeiro

=== Third place match ===
18 October

Russia	1–2	Italy

Rio de Janeiro

=== Final ===
19 October

Brazil	2–2 (a.e.t.)	Spain
Penalties
	4–3

Rio de Janeiro

== Champions ==
FIFA Futsal World Cup
2008 winners

Brazil
Fourth title

== Awards ==
Golden Shoe winner	Golden Ball winner	Golden Gloves winner
(Russia) Pula	(Brazil) Falcão	(Brazil) Tiago
Silver Shoe winner	Silver Ball winner	Goal of the Tournament
(Brazil) Falcão	(Brazil) Schumacher	(Guatemala) José Rafael González
Bronze Shoe winner	Bronze Ball winner	FIFA Fair Play Trophy
(Brazil) Lenísio	(Brazil) Tiago	Spain

== Top goalscorers ==
The top 10 scorers from the 2008 FIFA Futsal World Cup are as follows:

Rank	Name	Country	Goals
1	Pula	Russia	16
2	Falcão	Brazil	15
3	Lenísio	Brazil	11
4	Schumacher	Brazil	10
4	Damir Khamadiyev	Russia	10
6	Vladislav Shayakhmetov	Russia	9
7	Fabio Alcaraz	Paraguay	8
7	René Villalba	Paraguay	8
7	Cirilo	Russia	8
10	Fernando Grana	Italy	7
10	Dmitri Prudnikov	Russia	7
10	Fernandão	Spain	7

== Final tournament rankings ==
Per statistical convention in football, matches decided in extra time are counted as wins and losses, while matches decided by penalty shoot-out are counted as draws.

Pos	Team	Pld	W	D	L	GF	GA	GD	Pts	Final result
1	Brazil	9	8	1	0	64	8	+56	25	Champions
2	Spain	9	7	2	0	29	11	+18	23	Runners-up
3	Italy	9	5	1	3	25	18	+7	16	Third place
4	Russia	9	4	1	4	62	32	+30	13	Fourth place
5	Iran	7	4	2	1	24	19	+5	14	Eliminated in Second round
6	Argentina	7	3	3	1	19	12	+7	12	Eliminated in Second round
7	Paraguay	7	3	1	3	27	17	+10	10	Eliminated in Second round
8	Ukraine	7	3	1	3	24	21	+3	10	Eliminated in Second round
9	Portugal	4	3	0	1	15	8	+7	9	Eliminated in First round
10	Guatemala	4	2	0	2	14	9	+5	6	Eliminated in First round
11	Czech Republic	4	2	0	2	10	10	0	6	Eliminated in First round
12	Japan	4	2	0	2	13	24	–11	6	Eliminated in First round
13	Egypt	4	1	0	3	9	12	–3	3	Eliminated in First round
14	Thailand	4	1	0	3	7	15	–8	3	Eliminated in First round
15	Cuba	4	1	0	3	16	25	–9	3	Eliminated in First round
16	Libya	4	0	1	3	7	14	–7	1	Eliminated in First round
17	Uruguay	4	0	1	3	6	14	–8	1	Eliminated in First round
18	United States	4	0	0	4	5	24	–19	0	Eliminated in First round
19	China	4	0	0	4	5	25	–20	0	Eliminated in First round
20	Solomon Islands	4	0	0	4	6	69	–63	0	Eliminated in First round
