= 2000 FIFA Futsal World Championship =

FIFA Futsal World Championship Guatemala 2000 Campeonato Mundial de fútbol sala de la FIFA 2000

Tournament details
- Host country: Guatemala
- Dates: 18 November – 3 December
- Teams: 16 (from 6 confederations)
- Venues: 2 (in 1 host city)

Final positions
- Champions: Spain (1st title)
- Runners-up: Brazil
- Third place: Portugal
- Fourth place: Russia

Tournament statistics
- Matches played: 40
- Goals scored: 302 (7.55 per match)
- Attendance: 224,038 (5,601 per match)
- Top scorer: (Brazil) Manoel Tobias (19 goals)
- Best player: (Brazil) Manoel Tobias

The 2000 FIFA Futsal World Championship was the fourth FIFA Futsal World Championship, the quadrennial international futsal championship contested by the men's national teams of the member associations of FIFA. It was held between 18 November and 3 December 2000 in Guatemala. It was the first FIFA tournament held in the country.

Spain won the tournament, defeating Brazil in the final. They ended a streak of three straight championships by Brazil and also became the only nation other than the South Americans to win the title at that time until Argentina in 2016, and later Portugal in 2021.

== Qualifying criteria ==
=== Qualified nations ===
Competition	Date	Venue	Berths	Qualified
Host Nation			1	Guatemala
2000 AFC Futsal Championship	May 5–12, 2000	Thailand	3	Iran; Thailand; Kazakhstan
2000 African Futsal Championship	April 16–21, 2000	Egypt	1	Egypt
2000 CONCACAF Futsal Championship	July 20–29, 2000	Costa Rica	2	Costa Rica; Cuba
2000 South American Futsal Championship	April 29 – May 7, 2000	Brazil	3	Uruguay; Argentina; Brazil
1999 Oceanian Futsal Championship	August 21–28, 1999	Vanuatu	1	Australia
UEFA Preliminary Competition	January 30 – March 5, 2000	Groups	5	Portugal; Spain; Russia; Croatia; Netherlands
TOTAL			16	—

== Venues ==
Guatemala City
Domo Polideportivo de la CDAG	Gimnasio Nacional Teodoro Palacios Flores
Capacity: 10,000	Capacity: 8,000
2000 FIFA Futsal World Championship is located in Guatemala

== Squads ==
Each nation submitted a squad of 14 players, including two or three goalkeepers.

== First round ==
=== Group A ===
(18 November – 23 November)

Team	Pld	W	D	L	GF	GA	GD	Pts
Brazil	3	3	0	0	45	3	+42	9
Portugal	3	2	0	1	12	8	+4	6
Guatemala	3	1	0	2	10	40	−30	3
Kazakhstan	3	0	0	3	8	24	−16	0

Guatemala	2–6	Portugal
Brazil	12–1	Kazakhstan
Brazil	4–0	Portugal
Guatemala	6–5	Kazakhstan
Portugal	6–2	Kazakhstan
Guatemala	2–29	Brazil

=== Group B ===
(20 November – 23 November)

Team	Pld	W	D	L	GF	GA	GD	Pts
Netherlands	3	3	0	0	14	5	+9	9
Egypt	3	2	0	1	14	7	+7	6
Uruguay	3	1	0	2	7	8	−1	3
Thailand	3	0	0	3	2	17	−15	0

Uruguay	4–1	Thailand
Netherlands	5–3	Egypt
Egypt	7–0	Thailand
Netherlands	3–1	Uruguay
Netherlands	6–1	Thailand
Egypt	4–2	Uruguay

=== Group C ===
(19 November – 23 November)

Team	Pld	W	D	L	GF	GA	GD	Pts
Russia	3	3	0	0	20	4	+16	9
Croatia	3	2	0	1	12	5	+7	6
Costa Rica	3	1	0	2	8	12	−4	3
Australia	3	0	0	3	3	22	−19	0

Russia	4–2	Croatia
Costa Rica	6–2	Australia
Russia	6–1	Costa Rica
Croatia	6–0	Australia
Croatia	4–1	Costa Rica
Russia	10–1	Australia

=== Group D ===
(19 November – 23 November)

Team	Pld	W	D	L	GF	GA	GD	Pts
Spain	3	3	0	0	19	2	+17	9
Argentina	3	2	0	1	10	5	+5	6
Iran	3	1	0	2	6	9	−3	3
Cuba	3	0	0	3	1	20	−19	0

Spain	9–0	Cuba
Argentina	2–1	Iran
Argentina	8–1	Cuba
Spain	7–2	Iran
Iran	3–0	Cuba
Spain	3–0	Argentina

== Second round ==
=== Group E ===
(26 November – 29 November)

Team	Pld	W	D	L	GF	GA	GD	Pts
Brazil	3	3	0	0	22	7	+15	9
Russia	3	1	0	2	13	13	0	3
Egypt	3	1	0	2	13	20	−7	3
Argentina	3	1	0	2	6	14	−8	3

Russia	7–1	Argentina
Brazil	12–4	Egypt
Egypt	6–4	Russia
Brazil	4–1	Argentina
Argentina	4–3	Egypt
Brazil	6–2	Russia

=== Group F ===
(25 November – 28 November)

Team	Pld	W	D	L	GF	GA	GD	Pts
Spain	3	3	0	0	15	1	+14	9
Portugal	3	2	0	1	7	5	+2	6
Croatia	3	1	0	2	6	10	−4	3
Netherlands	3	0	0	3	3	15	−12	0

Portugal	3–1	Netherlands
Spain	5–0	Croatia
Croatia	5–2	Netherlands
Spain	3–1	Portugal
Portugal	3–1	Croatia
Spain	7–0	Netherlands

== Final round ==
Semi-finals
1 December 2000 – Guatemala City
Spain	3
Russia	2
1 December 2000 – Guatemala City
Brazil	8
Portugal	0

Final
3 December 2000 – Guatemala City
Spain	4
Brazil	3
Third place
3 December 2000 – Guatemala City
Russia	2
Portugal	4

=== Semi-finals ===
1 December 2000
18:00

Spain	3–2	Russia
Paulo Roberto 15:02; Daniel 23:03, 39:05	Report	Verizhnikov 2:01, 38:04

Domo Polideportivo de la CDAG
Attendance: 7,128
Referee: Francisco Salinas Ramírez (Paraguay)
1 December 2000
20:30

Brazil	8–0	Portugal
	Report

Domo Polideportivo de la CDAG
Attendance: 7,128
Referee: Félix Alberto Chávez (Argentina)

=== Third-place match ===
3 December 2000
14:00

Russia	2–4	Portugal
Agaphonov 5:01; Kupetskov 10:02	Report	Vitinha 15:03; Majó 27:04, 28:05; Formiga 38:07

Domo Polideportivo de la CDAG
Attendance: 7,568
Referee: Pedro Galán Nieto (Spain)

=== Final ===
3 December 2000
16:00

Spain	4–3	Brazil
Daniel 2' (pen.); Javi Sánchez 20'; Javi Rodríguez 36' (pen.), 39' (pen.)	Report	Anderson 18'; Manoel Tobías 30'; Vander 35'

Domo Polideportivo de la CDAG
Attendance: 7,568
Referee: Ivan Novak (Croatia)

== Champions ==
FIFA Futsal World Championships 2000 winners

Spain
First title

== Tournament ranking ==
Per statistical convention in football, matches decided in extra time are counted as wins and losses, while matches decided by penalty shoot-out are counted as draws.

Pos	Team	Pld	W	D	L	GF	GA	GD	Pts	Final result
1	Spain	8	8	0	0	41	8	+33	24	Champions
2	Brazil	8	7	0	1	78	14	+64	21	Runners-up
3	Portugal	8	5	0	3	23	23	0	15	Third place
4	Russia	8	4	0	4	37	24	+13	12	Fourth place
5	Croatia	6	3	0	3	18	15	+3	9	Eliminated in Second round
6	Egypt	6	3	0	3	27	27	0	9	Eliminated in Second round
7	Netherlands	6	3	0	3	17	20	–3	9	Eliminated in Second round
8	Argentina	6	3	0	3	16	19	–3	9	Eliminated in Second round
9	Uruguay	3	1	0	2	7	8	–1	3	Eliminated in First round
10	Iran	3	1	0	2	6	9	–3	3	Eliminated in First round
11	Costa Rica	3	1	0	2	8	12	–4	3	Eliminated in First round
12	Guatemala	3	1	0	2	10	40	–30	3	Eliminated in First round
13	Thailand	3	0	0	3	2	17	–15	0	Eliminated in First round
14	Kazakhstan	3	0	0	3	8	24	–16	0	Eliminated in First round
15	Australia	3	0	0	3	3	22	–19	0	Eliminated in First round
16	Cuba	3	0	0	3	1	20	–19	0	Eliminated in First round
