= 1996 CONCACAF Futsal Championship =

1st edition of the CONCACAF Futsal Championship

Campeonato de Futsal de CONCACAF 1996

Tournament details
- Host country: Guatemala
- City: Guatemala City
- Dates: 30 August – 7 September
- Teams: 6 (from 1 confederation)
- Venue: Gimnasio Teodoro Palacios Flores

Final positions
- Champions: United States (1st title)
- Runners-up: Cuba
- Third place: Mexico
- Fourth place: Guatemala

Tournament statistics
- Matches played: 10
- Goals scored: 75 (7.5 per match)

The 1996 CONCACAF Futsal Championship was the 1st edition of the CONCACAF Futsal Championship, the quadrennial international futsal championship organised by CONCACAF for the men's national teams of the North, Central American and Caribbean regions. The tournament was held in Guatemala City, Guatemala between 30 August and 7 September 1996.

The tournament acted as the CONCACAF qualifiers for the FIFA Futsal World Cup. The top two teams of the tournament, United States and Cuba, qualified for the 1996 FIFA Futsal World Cup in Spain as the CONCACAF representatives.

== Teams ==
CONCACAF announced that 6 teams will play in the tournament.

Team
Guatemala (hosts)
Panama
El Salvador
Cuba
Mexico
United States

== Group stage ==
The top two teams of each group advance to the semi-finals.

=== Group A ===
Pos	Team	Pld	W	D	L	GF	GA	GD	Pts	Qualification
1	United States	2	1	0	1	7	6	+1	3	Semi-finals
2	Cuba	2	1	0	1	9	9	0	3	Semi-finals
3	Costa Rica	2	1	0	1	7	8	−1	3	

Source: FutsalPlanet
30 August 1996

Costa Rica	6–4	Cuba

Gimnasio Teodoro Palacios Flores, Guatemala City

1 September 1996

United States	4–1	Costa Rica

Gimnasio Teodoro Palacios Flores, Guatemala City

3 September 1996

Cuba	5–3	United States

Gimnasio Teodoro Palacios Flores, Guatemala City

=== Group B ===
Pos	Team	Pld	W	D	L	GF	GA	GD	Pts	Qualification
1	Mexico	2	2	0	0	15	5	+10	6	Semi-finals
2	Guatemala (H)	2	1	0	1	5	10	−5	3	Semi-finals
3	El Salvador	2	0	0	2	5	10	−5	0	

Source: FutsalPlanet
(H) Hosts
30 August 1996

Guatemala	3–2	El Salvador

Gimnasio Teodoro Palacios Flores, Guatemala City

1 September 1996

Mexico	7–3	El Salvador

Gimnasio Teodoro Palacios Flores, Guatemala City

3 September 1996

Mexico	8–2	Guatemala

Gimnasio Teodoro Palacios Flores, Guatemala City

== Knockout stage ==
In the knockout stage, extra time and penalty shoot-out are used to decide the winner if necessary.

=== Bracket ===
Semi-finals
5 September
United States	7
Guatemala	3
5 September
Mexico	1
Cuba	2

Final
7 September
United States	7
Cuba	3
Third place match
7 September
Guatemala	1
Mexico	3

=== Semi-finals ===
Winners qualify for 1996 FIFA Futsal World Cup.

5 September 1996

United States	7–3	Guatemala

Gimnasio Teodoro Palacios Flores, Guatemala City
5 September 1996

Cuba	2–1	Mexico

Gimnasio Teodoro Palacios Flores, Guatemala City

=== Third place match ===
7 September 1996

Guatemala	1–3	Mexico

Gimnasio Teodoro Palacios Flores, Guatemala City

=== Final ===
7 September 1996

United States	7–3	Cuba

Gimnasio Teodoro Palacios Flores, Guatemala City

== Qualified teams for FIFA Futsal World Cup ==
The following two teams from CONCACAF qualified for the 1996 FIFA Futsal World Cup on 5 September 1996.

Team	Previous appearances in FIFA Futsal World Cup
United States	2 (1989, 1992)
Cuba	0
