= List of Portugal international futsal players =

This is a list of players who earned caps for the Portugal national futsal team.

As of February 2021, 151 different players have played for Portugal. The record for the most caps is held by Arnaldo Pereira with 208 between 1999 and 2016, overtaking André Lima's previous record of 111 caps on 13 January 2009.

The first player to reach 50 caps was Vitinha on 30 June 2002. The first player to reach 100 caps was André Lima on 14 October 2006, and the other players with 100 caps or more are Arnaldo Pereira, João Benedito, Ricardinho, Gonçalo Alves, Pedro Cary, João Matos, Joel Queirós, Bebé, Fernando Cardinal, Pedro Costa, Bruno Coelho, Ivan Dias, and Israel Alves. João Benedito is also the most capped Portuguese goalkeeper with 181 caps to his name from 2000 to 2014.

== Players ==
Players are listed by number of caps, then number of goals scored. If number of goals are equal, the players are then listed alphabetically. Statistics correct as of 27 February 2021.
Players in bold are still active for the national team.

Players capped for the Portugal national futsal team
#	Name	Position	Caps	Goals	Date of debut	Debut against	Date of final match	Final match against	Ref
1	Arnaldo Pereira	Winger	208	98	23 December 1999	Belgium	8 February 2016	Spain	
2	João Benedito	Goalkeeper	181	0	18 November 2000	Guatemala	8 February 2014	Spain	
3	Ricardinho	Winger	173	139	26 June 2003	Andorra	3 October 2021	Argentina	
4	Gonçalo Alves	Defender	171	75	22 October 2001	Spain	8 February 2014	Spain	
5	**Pedro Cary**	Winger	159	39	25 September 2007	Brazil	—	—	
6	**João Matos**	Defender	148	19	25 November 2008	Georgia	—	—	
7	Joel Queirós	Pivot	143	107	24 April 2002	Greece	28 October 2014	Georgia	
8	**Fernando Cardinal**	Pivot	121	97	25 March 2008	Iran	—	—	
8	**Bebé**	Goalkeeper	121	0	22 November 2005	Romania	—	—	
10	Pedro Costa	Universal	119	53	18 November 2000	Guatemala	8 February 2014	Spain	
11	**Bruno Coelho**	Winger	112	34	14 December 2010	Romania	—	—	
12	André Lima	Winger	111	107	4 November 1997	Spain	8 July 2007	Slovakia	
13	Ivan Dias	Defender	106	46	5 October 2000	Greece	15 April 2008	Slovenia	
14	Israel Alves	Winger	104	60	2 February 1999	Australia	23 October 2010	Italy	
15	**André Sousa**	Goalkeeper	96	2	12 July 2009	São Tomé and Príncipe	—	—	
16	Marinho	Winger	92	33	20 December 2005	Slovenia	8 January 2014	Switzerland	
17	Formiga	Winger	85	27	13 October 2000	Israel	13 January 2009	Belgium	
18	**Tiago Brito**	Winger	81	20	16 September 2014	Croatia	—	—	
18	**Fábio Cecílio**	Defender	81	19	16 September 2014	Croatia	—	—	
20	Fernando Leitão	Pivot	79	31	30 October 2007	Greece	8 February 2014	Spain	
21	Paulinho	Winger	76	13	12 July 2009	São Tomé and Príncipe	8 February 2016	Spain	
22	Zezito	Pivot	68	16	5 December 1998	Ukraine	17 February 2005	Hungary	
23	Zé Maria	Defender	66	13	25 September 2001	Costa Rica	15 April 2008	Slovenia	
23	**Vítor Hugo**	Goalkeeper	66	1	16 January 2007	Israel	—	—	
25	Djô	Defender	64	12	12 July 2009	São Tomé and Príncipe	1 October 2016	Iran	
26	**André Coelho**	Defender	55	13	19 August 2016	Mozambique	—	—	
27	Marcelinho	Defender	51	18	21 October 2004	England	23 September 2009	Thailand	
27	Vitinha	Defender	51	10	3 October 1995	Belgium	30 June 2002	Netherlands	
27	Cristiano	Goalkeeper	51	0	10 April 2007	Czech Republic	11 April 2017	Romania	
30	**Pany Varela**	Winger	49	6	22 September 2015	Brazil	—	—	
31	Majó	Winger	45	26	5 December 1998	Ukraine	1 December 2004	Spain	
32	Miguel Mota	Winger	44	6	4 November 1997	Spain	28 January 2003	Netherlands	
33	Ricardo Fernandes	Winger	42	9	12 July 2009	São Tomé and Príncipe	17 September 2014	Croatia	
34	Nelito	Pivot	38	26	25 January 1998	Spain	30 June 2002	Netherlands	
34	Fábio Aguiar	Winger	38	11	26 September 2006	Azerbaijan	29 October 2013	Spain	
34	**Nílson Miguel**	Defender	38	1	1 November 2016	Poland	—	—	
37	**Miguel Ângelo**	Winger	36	6	22 September 2015	Brazil	—	—	
37	Toni Martins	Goalkeeper	36	0	18 November 2000	Guatemala	29 June 2003	Slovakia	
39	João Marçal	Winger	34	8	22 October 2001	Spain	17 July 2009	Brazil	
40	Naná	Goalkeeper	33	0	3 March 1998	Andorra	30 September 2001	Czech Republic	
41	Leo Conceição	Defender	32	18	23 September 2003	Azerbaijan	17 January 2007	Israel	
42	António Teixeira	Pivot	31	7	5 December 1998	Ukraine	30 September 2001	Czech Republic	
43	Fábio Lima	Winger	30	5	8 January 2013	Poland	7 December 2016	North Macedonia	
44	Ré	Winger	29	5	3 December 2013	Slovenia	1 October 2016	Iran	
45	Jardel	Pivot	28	7	22 January 2008	Belgium	28 October 2009	Brazil	
45	Miguel Almeida	Universal	28	7	26 June 2003	Andorra	20 March 2009	Finland	
47	**Márcio Moreira**	Winger	27	4	6 December 2016	Bosnia and Herzegovina	—	—	
48	João Leite	Universal	26	9	4 November 1997	Spain	8 November 2003	Albania	
49	Carlos França	Goalkeeper	25	0	4 November 1997	Spain	15 October 2000	Poland	
50	Sandro Barradas	Goalkeeper	24	0	23 September 2003	Azerbaijan	17 February 2005	Hungary	
51	Sérgio Júnior	Defender	23	4	22 December 1999	Andorra	18 February 2003	Ukraine	
51	**Mário Freitas**	Winger	23	1	16 September 2014	Croatia	—	—	
53	Bibi	Defender	22	4	22 October 2001	Spain	8 October 2008	Thailand	
54	Seninho	Winger	19	15	9 February 1987	Spain	28 October 1995	Ukraine	
54	**Erick Mendonça**	Defender	19	1	3 April 2018	Serbia	—	—	
56	Luís Silva	Winger	18	7	14 October 2002	Czech Republic	17 January 2007	Israel	
56	Paulo Mendes	Defender	18	5	9 February 1987	Spain	28 October 1995	Ukraine	
56	Tunha	Pivot	18	2	25 September 2017	Russia	24 September 2019	Spain	
56	Alex Peixoto	Goalkeeper	18	0	3 October 2003	Brazil	28 February 2008	Latvia	
60	Tiago Soares	Winger	14	4	2 July 2008	Libya	16 May 2012	Belgium	
60	Paulo Mota	Winger	14	3	23 October 1995	Hungary	30 September 2001	Czech Republic	
62	Jony	Pivot	13	12	22 November 2005	Romania	13 October 2006	Macau	
62	Gil Marques	Winger	13	2	4 November 1997	Spain	1 July 2001	Brazil	
64	Nuno Dias	Defender	12	4	23 December 1999	Belgium	1 July 2001	Brazil	
65	Eduardo Miguel	Pivot	11	3	4 November 1997	Spain	30 January 2004	Andorra	
65	Madié	Winger	11	3	9 February 1987	Spain	17 April 1992	Belgium	
65	Nandinho	Winger	11	3	15 May 2012	Belgium	14 November 2012	Italy	
65	Zé Belo	Goalkeeper	11	0	13 September 1987	Belgium	23 October 1995	Hungary	
69	Pedro Antunes	Pivot	10	4	12 April 1992	Netherlands	28 October 1995	Ukraine	
69	Ivo Cristóvão	Defender	10	4	25 January 1998	Spain	25 February 1999	Russia	
69	Amílcar Gomes	Winger	10	1	12 July 2009	São Tomé and Príncipe	4 December 2013	Slovenia	
69	Lhé	Winger	10	0	12 April 1992	Netherlands	28 October 1995	Ukraine	
69	Sílvio Roda	Goalkeeper	10	0	21 October 2004	England	17 February 2005	Hungary	
74	Vitinha	Winger	9	6	22 December 1999	Andorra	5 February 2000	Italy	
74	Carlos Silva	Defender	9	2	9 February 1987	Spain	18 September 1987	United States	
74	Minhoca	Defender	9	1	27 September 2005	Spain	17 January 2006	Italy	
77	Ricardinho	Universal	8	0	19 August 2016	Mozambique	7 December 2016	North Macedonia	
78	Manuel Azevedo	Winger	7	8	3 October 1995	Belgium	28 October 1995	Ukraine	
78	**Pauleta**	Winger	7	2	4 December 2018	Ukraine	—	—	
78	Paulo Jorge	Defender	7	2	3 October 1995	Belgium	28 October 1995	Ukraine	
78	Xana	Winger	7	1	4 November 1997	Spain	28 February 1999	Yugoslavia	
78	José Camilo	Goalkeeper	7	0	3 October 1995	Belgium	28 October 1995	Ukraine	
78	Manuel Jorge	Winger	7	0	3 October 1995	Belgium	28 October 1995	Ukraine	
78	Raul Oliveira	Goalkeeper	7	0	13 September 1987	Belgium	12 April 1992	Netherlands	
78	Evandro Souza	Winger	7	0	27 October 2009	Brazil	30 January 2010	Spain	
86	Paulo David	Winger	6	3	25 March 2008	Iran	17 July 2009	Brazil	
86	Ricardo Caturra	Defender	6	2	20 July 2006	Switzerland	26 September 2007	Brazil	
86	André Gomes	Winger	6	0	12 July 2009	São Tomé and Príncipe	16 May 2012	Belgium	
86	Rui Meireles	Winger	6	0	3 October 1995	Belgium	28 October 1995	Ukraine	
86	Paulinho Rocha	Universal	6	0	22 March 2011	Japan	14 September 2011	Russia	
86	Nuno Rodrigues	Goalkeeper	6	0	7 January 2003	Hungary	20 February 2003	Belgium	
92	Paulo Miguel	Universal	5	4	9 February 1987	Spain	16 September 1987	Chile	
92	Nuno Soares	Winger	5	2	13 September 1987	Belgium	18 September 1987	United States	
92	Paulo Castelinho	Winger	5	1	25 January 1998	Spain	25 February 1999	Russia	
92	José Maria	Winger	5	1	13 September 1987	Belgium	18 September 1987	United States	
92	Gabriel Pereira	Winger	5	1	27 October 2005	Poland	23 November 2005	Romania	
92	Júlio Andrade	Winger	5	0	13 September 1987	Belgium	18 September 1987	United States	
92	Quim Barata	Goalkeeper	5	0	9 February 1987	Spain	18 September 1987	United States	
92	Drula	Winger	5	0	24 April 2002	Greece	28 January 2003	Netherlands	
92	Luís Estrela	Winger	5	0	7 February 2005	Poland	18 January 2006	Italy	
92	**Afonso Jesus**	Defender	5	0	6 December 2017	Slovenia	—	—	
92	João Lopes	Winger	5	0	3 March 1998	Andorra	25 February 1999	Russia	
92	**Edu Sousa**	Goalkeeper	5	0	3 December 2019	France	—	—	
92	**Edgar Varela**	Winger	5	0	27 January 2017	Russia	—	—	
105	Fábio Soares	Winger	4	2	12 July 2009	São Tomé and Príncipe	17 July 2009	Brazil	
105	André Galvão	Pivot	4	1	15 May 2012	Belgium	5 December 2018	Ukraine	
105	Pedro Miguel	Pivot	4	1	12 April 1992	Netherlands	17 April 1992	Belgium	
105	Hugo Ramada	Winger	4	1	12 July 2009	São Tomé and Príncipe	17 July 2009	Brazil	
105	Fernando Rodrigues	Winger	4	1	12 April 1992	Netherlands	17 April 1992	Belgium	
105	João Rodrigues	Defender	4	1	12 April 1992	Netherlands	17 April 1992	Belgium	
105	Pedro Catalim	Goalkeeper	4	0	9 February 1987	Spain	12 February 1987	Hungary	
105	Coelho	Universal	4	0	15 May 2012	Belgium	4 April 2018	Serbia	
105	Paulo Leite	Universal	4	0	5 October 2000	France	13 October 2000	Israel	
105	Marco Mateus	Goalkeeper	4	0	12 July 2009	São Tomé and Príncipe	17 July 2009	Brazil	
105	Davide Moura	Winger	4	0	22 March 2011	Japan	16 May 2012	Belgium	
105	Lino Oliveira	Goalkeeper	4	0	9 February 1987	Spain	12 February 1987	Hungary	
105	Eusébio Rodrigues	Universal	4	0	9 February 1987	Spain	12 February 1987	Hungary	
105	Samirro	Universal	4	0	9 February 1987	Spain	12 February 1987	Hungary	
105	**Tiaguinho**	Winger	4	0	4 December 2018	Ukraine	—	—	
120	Luís Jorge	Winger	3	1	12 April 1992	Netherlands	16 April 1992	Italy	
120	Nuno Coelho	Winger	3	0	22 December 1999	Andorra	1 July 2001	Brazil	
120	Luís Miguel	Universal	3	0	1 February 1999	Australia	22 February 1999	Belgium	
120	Paulo Marcos	Goalkeeper	3	0	5 December 1998	Ukraine	8 December 1998	Bosnia and Herzegovina	
120	Nelinho	Winger	3	0	12 April 1992	Netherlands	16 April 1992	Italy	
120	Mário Oliveira	Pivot	3	0	5 December 1998	Ukraine	8 December 1998	Bosnia and Herzegovina	
120	João Trindade	Winger	3	0	9 February 1987	Spain	11 February 1987	United States	
127	Pupa	Winger	2	1	8 January 2013	Poland	9 January 2013	Poland	
127	Torugo	Winger	2	1	8 January 2013	Poland	9 January 2013	Poland	
127	Camarão	Defender	2	0	4 November 1997	Spain	25 January 1998	Spain	
127	**Tiago Cruz**	Winger	2	0	30 October 2018	Japan	—	—	
127	Dani Fernandes	Pivot	2	0	3 October 1995	Belgium	4 October 1995	Spain	
127	Hélder Fernandes	Goalkeeper	2	0	15 May 2012	Belgium	16 May 2012	Belgium	
127	Pedro Ferreira	Universal	2	0	30 June 2001	Spain	1 July 2001	Brazil	
127	**Ludgero Lopes**	Pivot	2	0	22 June 2019	Norway	—	—	
127	Sérgio Machado	Winger	2	0	3 June 1995	Belgium	4 June 1995	Spain	
127	Gustavo Martins	Winger	2	0	15 May 2012	Belgium	16 May 2012	Belgium	
127	André Nabais	Defender	2	0	8 January 2013	Poland	9 January 2013	Poland	
127	Nhonha	Pivot	2	0	30 June 2001	Spain	1 July 2001	Brazil	
127	Miguel Nunes	Goalkeeper	2	0	16 April 1992	Italy	17 April 1992	Belgium	
127	**Gonçalo Portugal**	Goalkeeper	2	0	22 June 2019	Norway	—	—	
127	**Rui Pedro**	Goalkeeper	2	0	22 June 2019	Norway	—	—	
127	Ruizinho	Winger	2	0	29 June 2002	Slovakia	30 June 2002	Netherlands	
127	Daniel Tasaka	Goalkeeper	2	0	16 January 2007	Israel	17 January 2007	Israel	
144	Cautela	Defender	1	1	4 November 1997	Spain	4 November 1997	Spain	
144	Hélder Amaral	Winger	1	0	25 January 1998	Spain	25 January 1998	Spain	
144	Sandro Azenha	Goalkeeper	1	0	6 July 2008	Hungary	6 July 2008	Hungary	
144	Pedro Caetano	Universal	1	0	22 December 1999	Andorra	22 December 1999	Andorra	
144	André Marques	Universal	1	0	25 January 1998	Spain	25 January 1998	Spain	
144	Nuno Neves	Universal	1	0	4 November 1997	Spain	4 November 1997	Spain	
144	Jorge Pires	Universal	1	0	25 January 1998	Spain	25 January 1998	Spain	
144	Zé Carlos	Goalkeeper	1	0	4 November 1997	Spain	4 November 1997	Spain	
