= 2000 FIFA Futsal World Championship squads =

List of confirmed national squads for 2000 FIFA Futsal World Championship tournament

This article lists the confirmed national futsal squads for the 2000 FIFA Futsal World Championship tournament held in Guatemala, between November 18 and December 3, 2000.

== Group A ==
=== Guatemala ===
Team coach: (Brazil) Fernando Ferretti

No.	Pos.	Player	Date of birth (age)	Caps	Goals	Club
1	GK	Carlos Merida	27 March 1978 (aged 22)			(Guatemala) Futeca
2	GK	Juan José Ruíz	5 February 1980 (aged 20)			(Guatemala) Futeca
3		Rolf Rottmann	29 July 1972 (aged 28)			(Guatemala) Futeca
4		Hector de Mata	17 April 1980 (aged 20)			(Guatemala) Chimaltenango
5		Luís Chicas	30 November 1982 (aged 17)			(Guatemala) Universidad SC
6		Marvin Mejicanos	26 December 1962 (aged 37)			(Guatemala) Club Menedy
7		Wylder Rodríguez	21 November 1980 (aged 19)			(Guatemala) Futeca
8		Claudio Rojas	29 November 1973 (aged 26)			(Guatemala) Comunicaciones
9		Carlos Ruiz	15 September 1979 (aged 21)			(Guatemala) Municipal
10		Erick Acevedo (captain)	20 September 1980 (aged 20)			(Guatemala) Futeca
11		Freddy García	12 January 1977 (aged 23)			(Guatemala) Comunicaciones
12	GK	Luis Pedro Molina	4 June 1977 (aged 23)			(Guatemala) Comunicaciones
13		Estuardo Juárez	6 July 1976 (aged 24)			(Guatemala) Futeca
14		Erick Fion	20 February 1976 (aged 24)			(Guatemala) Aurora

=== Brazil ===
Team coach: (Brazil) Vander Iacovino

No.	Pos.	Player	Date of birth (age)	Caps	Goals	Club
1	GK	Lavoisier	27 March 1974 (aged 26)			(Brazil) Vasco da Gama
2	GK	Rogério Alves	20 September 1973 (aged 27)			(Brazil) Atlético Mineiro
3		Anderson Andrade	28 February 1976 (aged 24)			(Brazil) São Miguel Futsal
4		André Siqueira (captain)	4 May 1976 (aged 24)			(Brazil) Vasco da Gama
5		Manoel Tobias	19 April 1971 (aged 29)			(Brazil) Vasco da Gama
6		Fininho	6 July 1972 (aged 28)			(Brazil) Ulbra
7		Almir	21 December 1974 (aged 25)			(Brazil) GM/Chevrolet
8		Schumacher	21 August 1975 (aged 25)			(Brazil) Vasco da Gama
9		Índio	10 June 1972 (aged 28)			(Brazil) Vasco da Gama
10		Lenísio	23 October 1976 (aged 24)			(Brazil) Atlético Mineiro
11		Joan Nunes	4 July 1976 (aged 24)			(Brazil) São Paulo
12		Falcão	8 June 1977 (aged 23)			(Brazil) Banespa
13	GK	Franklin Bueres	18 May 1971 (aged 29)			(Brazil) GM/Chevrolet
14		Vander Carioca	22 June 1976 (aged 24)			(Brazil) Flamengo

=== Kazakhstan ===
Team coach: (Kazakhstan) Kassymzhan Madjyev

No.	Pos.	Player	Date of birth (age)	Caps	Goals	Club
1	GK	Dmitriy Lakamov	30 July 1976 (aged 24)			(Kazakhstan) Alibi
2		Sergey Lukonin	8 May 1975 (aged 25)			(Kazakhstan) Alibi
3		Andrey Linevich	23 July 1968 (aged 32)			(Kazakhstan) Aksauit
4		Alexandr Bondarev (captain)	22 December 1975 (aged 24)			(Kazakhstan) Alibi
5		Gabdulla Kassenov	5 January 1968 (aged 32)			(Kazakhstan) Aksauit
6		Bolat Yerezhepov	3 July 1971 (aged 29)			(Kazakhstan) Kainur
7		Yermek Tursunov	20 July 1961 (aged 39)			(Kazakhstan) Kainur
8		Yebol Koshanov	20 March 1977 (aged 23)			(Kazakhstan) Aksauit
9		Talgat Baimuratov	1 July 1972 (aged 28)			(Kazakhstan) Alibi
10		Ramil Yussupov	25 November 1979 (aged 20)			(Kazakhstan) Alibi
11		Kairat Toxanbayev	9 September 1970 (aged 30)			(Kazakhstan) Aksauit
12	GK	Nurzhan Doskeyev	4 February 1972 (aged 28)			(Kazakhstan) Kainur
13		Kairat Biykenov	23 September 1965 (aged 35)			(Kazakhstan) Alibi
14		Yergali Kalikov	4 January 1966 (aged 34)			(Kazakhstan) Alibi

=== Portugal ===
Team coach: (Portugal) Orlando Duarte

No.	Pos.	Player	Date of birth (age)	Caps	Goals	Club
1	GK	Toni Martins	10 August 1974 (aged 26)			(Portugal) Miramar FC
2	DF	Ivan Dias	28 August 1972 (aged 28)			(Portugal) Miramar FC
3	MF	Pedro Costa	18 December 1978 (aged 21)			(Portugal) Sporting CP
4	DF	Vitinha (captain)	16 March 1969 (aged 31)			(Portugal) Sporting CP
5	MF	Arnaldo Pereira	16 June 1979 (aged 21)			(Portugal) Instituto D. João V
6	FW	António Teixeira	2 April 1975 (aged 25)			(Portugal) Atlético CP
7	MF	André Lima	10 May 1971 (aged 29)			(Portugal) Miramar FC
8	MF	Majó	16 April 1975 (aged 25)			(Portugal) Atlético CP
9	MF	Miguel Mota	14 September 1974 (aged 26)			(Portugal) Miramar FC
10	MF	Formiga	22 October 1978 (aged 22)			(Portugal) AR Freixieiro
11	FW	Nelito	31 March 1970 (aged 30)			(Portugal) Sporting Vila Verde
12	GK	Naná	8 September 1969 (aged 31)			(Portugal) Correio da Manhã
13	FW	Zezito	4 January 1973 (aged 27)			(Portugal) Sporting CP
14	GK	João Benedito	7 October 1978 (aged 22)			(Portugal) Sporting CP

== Group B ==
=== Egypt ===
Team coach: (Egypt) Emad Hag

No.	Pos.	Player	Date of birth (age)	Caps	Goals	Club
1	GK	Yasser Mohamed	7 April 1973 (aged 27)			(Egypt) Ismaily
2	GK	Ayman Nassef	13 August 1976 (aged 24)			(Egypt) Ismaily
3		Ehab Sayed	9 November 1977 (aged 23)			(Egypt) Egeco
4		Nader Soliman	10 November 1979 (aged 21)			(Egypt) El-Shams
5		Mahmoud Mohamed	19 April 1978 (aged 22)			(Egypt) ENPPI
6		Wael Abdalla	17 January 1976 (aged 24)			(Egypt) Ismaily
7		Mohamed Abdelhamid	29 January 1977 (aged 23)			(Egypt) Ismaily
8		Samir Attia	8 June 1975 (aged 25)			(Egypt) Olympic
9		Tamer Ismail (captain)	19 October 1968 (aged 32)			(Egypt) Olympic
10		Sayed Abdel Kader	11 September 1975 (aged 25)			(Egypt) ENPPI
11		Arafa Sayed	20 October 1973 (aged 27)			(Egypt) Egeco
12		Sabry Abdou	13 January 1976 (aged 24)			(Egypt) ENPPI
13		Morsy Kenawy	11 October 1974 (aged 26)			(Egypt) Asmant el-Suweis
14		Youssef Mohamed	25 October 1975 (aged 25)			(Egypt) Demyat

=== Uruguay ===
Team coach: (Uruguay) César Robido

No.	Pos.	Player	Date of birth (age)	Caps	Goals	Club
1	GK	Carlos Clavero	16 March 1967 (aged 33)			(Uruguay) Nacional
2	DF	Juan Falco	30 September 1978 (aged 22)			(Uruguay) Nacional
3	FW	Martín Pérez	8 July 1978 (aged 22)			(Uruguay) Nacional
4	MF	Gustavo Silva	27 August 1976 (aged 24)			(Uruguay) Nacional
5	DF	Andrés D'Alessandro	9 October 1978 (aged 22)			(Uruguay) Peñarol
6	MF	Pablo Lamanna	25 October 1974 (aged 26)			(Uruguay) Banco República
7	DF	Walter Skurko	8 August 1971 (aged 29)			(Spain) Inca
8	MF	Miguel Aguirrezabala (captain)	23 February 1970 (aged 30)			(Uruguay) Nacional
9	FW	Nico Moliterno	4 October 1971 (aged 29)			(Uruguay) Nacional
10	MF	Álvaro Piñeiro	16 June 1971 (aged 29)			(Spain) AE Manacor
11	MF	Martín Hernández	25 August 1977 (aged 23)			(Uruguay) Peñarol
12	GK	Roberto Merola	11 April 1971 (aged 29)			(Uruguay) Banco República
13	GK	Mauro Roibal	16 December 1971 (aged 28)			(Uruguay) Banco República
14	DF	Claudio Guerra	1 August 1966 (aged 34)			(Spain) AE Manacor

=== Thailand ===
Team coach: (Brazil) Sílvio Pinheiro

No.	Pos.	Player	Date of birth (age)	Caps	Goals	Club
1	GK	Vilard Normcharoen	14 July 1962 (aged 38)			(Thailand) Port Authority
2		Pichet Piasai	22 August 1971 (aged 29)			(Thailand) Metropolitan Administration
3	MF	Pattaya Piamkum	13 June 1968 (aged 32)			(Thailand) Metropolitan Administration
4		Tairong Poodee	27 August 1978 (aged 22)			(Thailand) Metropolitan Administration
5	DF	Panuwat Janta	14 February 1979 (aged 21)			(Thailand) Rajdamnoen Commercial School
6	GK	Chalermphon Pormsrirot	5 December 1968 (aged 31)			(Thailand) Provincial Electricity Authority
7	FW	Anucha Munjarern	9 October 1979 (aged 21)			(Thailand) Bangkok Christian College
8	DF	Yutthana Polsak (captain)	21 March 1970 (aged 30)			(Thailand) Rajpracha
9		Khumron Sumranphun	19 November 1969 (aged 30)			(Thailand) Port Authority
10		Apisit Khaikaew	6 June 1974 (aged 26)			(Thailand) Port Authority
11		Montree Praepun	18 January 1973 (aged 27)			(Thailand) Air Force
12	GK	Bancha Nunart	17 March 1973 (aged 27)			(Thailand) Air Force
13		Sompong Phungphook	29 October 1970 (aged 30)			(Thailand) Prachinburi Province
14	DF	Narongsak Khongkaew	17 January 1979 (aged 21)			(Thailand) Bangkok Christian College

=== Netherlands ===
Team coach: (Netherlands) Nico Spreij

No.	Pos.	Player	Date of birth (age)	Caps	Goals	Club
1	GK	Tom Sier	17 November 1973 (aged 27)			(Netherlands) Hilversum
2		Said Moumane	8 November 1971 (aged 29)			(Netherlands) Veerhuys
3		Anton Biloro	19 August 1969 (aged 31)			(Netherlands) Bunga Melati
4		Hank Leatemia (captain)	13 July 1966 (aged 34)			(Netherlands) Bunga Melati
5		Pascal Langenhuijsen	4 June 1971 (aged 29)			(Netherlands) Den Haag/Trimeur
6		Moes Talha	1 December 1970 (aged 29)			(Netherlands) Den Haag/Trimeur
7		Maarten Frankfort	15 March 1976 (aged 24)			(Netherlands) Veerhuys
8		Hennie Lettinck	5 January 1967 (aged 33)			(Netherlands) Den Haag/Trimeur
9		Glenn Zeelig	3 December 1974 (aged 25)			(Netherlands) Veerhuys
10		Max Tjaden	13 June 1971 (aged 29)			(Netherlands) Veerhuys
11		René Marechal	2 October 1973 (aged 27)			(Netherlands) De Hommel
12		Antoine Merlino	23 May 1978 (aged 22)			(Netherlands) Bunga Melati
13	GK	Ron Sijm	9 August 1975 (aged 25)			(Netherlands) Veerhuys
14	GK	Patrick Thomassen	25 August 1965 (aged 35)			(Netherlands) De Hommel

== Group C ==
=== Russia ===
Team coach: (Russia) Mikhail Bondarev

No.	Pos.	Player	Date of birth (age)	Caps	Goals	Club
1	GK	Oleg Denisov	9 February 1967 (aged 33)			(Russia) Dina Moskva
2	FW	Konstantin Eremenko	5 August 1970 (aged 30)			(Russia) Dina Moskva
3	DF	Denis Agafonov	6 April 1975 (aged 25)			(Russia) VIZ-Sinara
4	DF	Alexander Verizhnikov (captain)	16 July 1968 (aged 32)			(Russia) Dina Moskva
5	DF	Temur Alekberov	22 September 1969 (aged 31)			(Russia) Dina Moskva
6	DF	Sergei Malyshev	7 August 1975 (aged 25)			(Russia) GKI-Gazprom
7	DF	Mikhail Markin	16 November 1971 (aged 29)			(Russia) Dina Moskva
8	MF	Vladislav Shchuchko	29 June 1976 (aged 24)			(Russia) Norilsky Nikel
9	FW	Boris Kupetskov	18 August 1976 (aged 24)			(Russia) Dina Moskva
10	MF	Arkady Bely	31 May 1973 (aged 27)			(Russia) Dina Moskva
11	DF	Dmitri Chugunov	9 June 1968 (aged 32)			(Russia) Dina Moskva
12	GK	Ilya Samokhin	10 August 1970 (aged 30)			(Russia) Dina Moskva
13	MF	Gennady Ionov	25 May 1976 (aged 24)			(Russia) GKI-Gazprom
14	GK	Andrei Tkachuk	13 August 1974 (aged 26)			(Russia) Dina Moskva

=== Australia ===
Team coach: (Australia) James Roberts

No.	Pos.	Player	Date of birth (age)	Caps	Goals	Club
1	GK	Adam Confoy (captain)	21 June 1971 (aged 29)			(Australia) Sydney Falcons
2		David Palywoda	19 April 1979 (aged 21)			(Australia) Supercats
3		Brett Hewit	10 July 1971 (aged 29)			(Australia) Sydney Falcons
4		Daniel Macor	11 December 1973 (aged 26)			(Australia) Azzurri
5		Simon Keith	26 July 1975 (aged 25)			(Australia) Quake
6		Matthew Whyte	6 August 1977 (aged 23)			(Australia) Supercats
7		Simon Aitchison	31 August 1972 (aged 28)			(Australia) Skipsu
8		Andrew Nolan	28 October 1981 (aged 19)			(Australia) Sydney Falcons
9		Elliot Zwangobani	23 October 1973 (aged 27)			(Australia) CBF
10		Jason Wells	27 March 1971 (aged 29)			(Australia) Sydney Falcons
11		Elia Salloum	3 April 1978 (aged 22)			(Australia) CBF
12		Jamie Amendolia	16 February 1977 (aged 23)			(Australia) Sydney Falcons
13	GK	Jorge Suarez	10 August 1976 (aged 24)			(Australia) Sydney Falcons
14	GK	Gavin O'Brien	30 September 1977 (aged 23)			(Australia) Quake

=== Costa Rica ===
Team coach: (Costa Rica) Carlos Quiros Alvarez

No.	Pos.	Player	Date of birth (age)	Caps	Goals	Club
1	GK	Randall Salas	30 March 1971 (aged 29)			(Costa Rica) Borussia
2		Eric Arce	22 June 1970 (aged 30)			(Costa Rica) Borussia
3		Diego Solis	15 May 1962 (aged 38)			(Costa Rica) UCR
4		José Picado	30 December 1973 (aged 26)			(Costa Rica) Borussia
5		Alejandro Alpízar	14 June 1979 (aged 21)			(Costa Rica) Borussia
6		Gilbert Alpízar	7 January 1971 (aged 29)			(Costa Rica) Borussia
7		Ricardo Juárez	25 November 1978 (aged 21)			(Costa Rica) Borussia
8		José Carvajal (captain)	31 March 1968 (aged 32)			(Costa Rica) Borussia
9		Freddy Espinoza	16 February 1974 (aged 26)			(Costa Rica) Borussia
10		Carlos Chaves	3 January 1980 (aged 20)			(Costa Rica) UNA
11		Juan Valverde	4 November 1972 (aged 28)			(Costa Rica) UCR
12		Rolando Fonseca	6 June 1974 (aged 26)			(Guatemala) Comunicaciones
13		Allan Innecken	26 March 1972 (aged 28)			(Costa Rica) UCR
14	GK	José Luís Garro	1 November 1967 (aged 33)			(Costa Rica) Juventud Olímpica

=== Croatia ===
Team coach: (Croatia) Marijan Brnčić

No.	Pos.	Player	Date of birth (age)	Caps	Goals	Club
1	GK	Tomislav Papeš	1 August 1973 (aged 27)			(Croatia) Petrinjčica
2		Velimir Čarapina	16 May 1974 (aged 26)			(Croatia) Uspinjača
3		Edin Dervišagić	30 April 1968 (aged 32)			(Croatia) Petar RKM
4		Tomislav Gričar	11 January 1972 (aged 28)			(Croatia) Uspinjača
5		Mićo Martić (captain)	24 February 1964 (aged 36)			(Italy) Bergamo
6		Siniša Alebić	24 September 1969 (aged 31)			(Croatia) Split Star Šport
7		Goran Eklić	20 November 1965 (aged 34)			(Italy) La Dominante
8		Nikola Tomičić	16 April 1973 (aged 27)			(Croatia) Split Star Šport
9		Pjer Malvasija	5 July 1970 (aged 30)			(Croatia) Split Star Šport
10		Robert Grdović	23 February 1974 (aged 26)			(Italy) Cagliari
11		Alen Delpont	24 July 1971 (aged 29)			(Croatia) Split Star Šport
12	GK	Božidar Butigan	27 December 1963 (aged 36)			(Croatia) Square Dubrovnik
13		Mate Čuljak	4 September 1975 (aged 25)			(Italy) Luparense
14	GK	Alen Jukić	9 October 1975 (aged 25)			(Croatia) Uspinjača

== Group D ==
=== Iran ===
Team coach: (Iran) Hossein Shams

No.	Pos.	Player	Date of birth (age)	Caps	Goals	Club
1	GK	Amir Farrashi	21 March 1968 (aged 32)			(Iran) Peyman Tehran
2		Safar Ali Kazemi	30 April 1970 (aged 30)			(Iran) Hesa Isfahan
3		Ahmad Pariazar	12 July 1975 (aged 25)			(Iran) Rah Ahan Tehran
4	DF	Ali Sanei	28 June 1973 (aged 27)			(Iran) Hesa Isfahan
5	MF	Siamak Dadashi	13 July 1974 (aged 26)			(Iran) Peyman Tehran
6		Alireza Afzal	13 April 1974 (aged 26)			(Iran) Zob Ahan Isfahan
7	FW	Ahmad Baghbanbashi	31 March 1972 (aged 28)			(Iran) Sepahan Isfahan
8		Kazem Mohammadi	23 August 1973 (aged 27)			(Iran) Peyman Tehran
9	FW	Vahid Shamsaei	21 September 1975 (aged 25)			(Iran) Peyman Tehran
10	MF	Mohammad Reza Heidarian	17 February 1974 (aged 26)			(Iran) Esteghlal
11	FW	Babak Masoumi (captain)	13 July 1972 (aged 28)			(Iran) Esteghlal
12	GK	Asghar Ghahremani	6 March 1972 (aged 28)			(Iran) Payam Paykan
13		Mojtaba Moeini	24 August 1975 (aged 25)			(Iran) Esteghlal
14		Moslem Tolouei	12 February 1971 (aged 29)			(Iran) Shensa Saveh

=== Cuba ===
Team coach: (Cuba) Clemente Reinoso

No.	Pos.	Player	Date of birth (age)	Caps	Goals	Club
1	GK	Francis López	4 October 1976 (aged 24)			(Cuba) Ciudad de La Habana
3		Ernesto Duane	2 June 1970 (aged 30)			(Cuba) Ciego de Ávila
4		José Luis Arencibia	10 October 1973 (aged 27)			(Cuba) Holguín
5		Amauri Morales	20 December 1972 (aged 27)			(Cuba) Ciudad de La Habana
6		Pillin Guerra (captain)	12 January 1969 (aged 31)			(Cuba) Ciudad de La Habana
7		Camilo Kindelán	2 May 1960 (aged 40)			(Cuba) Ciudad de La Habana
8		Alvaro Mederos	23 July 1977 (aged 23)			(Cuba) Cienfuegos
9		Carecas Martínez	9 January 1968 (aged 32)			(Cuba) Ciudad de La Habana
10		Papi Portal	24 July 1967 (aged 33)			(Cuba) Ciudad de La Habana
11		Boris Sanamé	2 June 1974 (aged 26)			(Cuba) Ciudad de La Habana
12	GK	Wilfredo Carbó	1 December 1969 (aged 30)			(Cuba) Ciudad de La Habana
14	GK	Dagmar Gómez	29 March 1972 (aged 28)			(Cuba) Ciudad de La Habana

=== Spain ===
Team coach: (Spain) Javier Lozano

No.	Pos.	Player	Date of birth (age)	Caps	Goals	Club
1	GK	Jesús Clavería (captain)	4 January 1968 (aged 32)			(Spain) Antena3 Boomerang
2	DF	Julio García	27 May 1972 (aged 28)			(Spain) Antena3 Boomerang
3	MF	Santi	27 March 1971 (aged 29)			(Spain) Foticos Zaragoza
4	DF	Antonio Adeva	12 February 1972 (aged 28)			(Spain) Caja Segovia
5	DF	Javier Orol	4 April 1973 (aged 27)			(Spain) Antena3 Boomerang
6	FW	Joan Linares	24 February 1975 (aged 25)			(Spain) Playas de Castellón
7	MF	Javi Rodriguez	26 March 1974 (aged 26)			(Spain) Playas de Castellón
8	DF	Kike	4 May 1978 (aged 22)			(Spain) Valencia Vijusa
9	FW	Javi Sánchez	15 January 1971 (aged 29)			(Spain) Playas de Castellón
10	FW	Paulo Roberto	12 August 1967 (aged 33)			(Spain) ElPozo Murcia
11	FW	Alberto Riquer	10 October 1974 (aged 26)			(Spain) Caja Segovia
12	GK	Luis Amado	4 May 1976 (aged 24)			(Spain) Caja Segovia
13	GK	Guillermo Martín	11 January 1972 (aged 28)			(Spain) Playas de Castellón
14	MF	Daniel Ibañes	6 July 1976 (aged 24)			(Spain) Caja Segovia
15	GK	Ricardo Jiménez	30 June 1969 (aged 31)			(Spain) ElPozo Murcia

=== Argentina ===
Team coach: (Argentina) Fernando Larrañaga

No.	Pos.	Player	Date of birth (age)	Caps	Goals	Club
1	GK	Javier Guisande	15 December 1975 (aged 24)			(Argentina) Boca Juniors
2		Leandro Planas	28 November 1975 (aged 24)			(Italy) Roma Calcetto
3		Juan Segura	23 December 1975 (aged 24)			(Argentina) Boca Juniors
4		Diego Giustozzi	1 August 1978 (aged 22)			(Italy) BNL Roma
5		Carlos Sánchez	31 January 1975 (aged 25)			(Italy) Genzano
6		Esteban González	13 May 1977 (aged 23)			(Italy) BNL Roma
7		Augusto Mónaco	9 July 1970 (aged 30)			(Argentina) San Lorenzo
8		Hernan Garcias	2 June 1978 (aged 22)			(Italy) Torino
9		Rodrigo Petillo	19 May 1977 (aged 23)			(Italy) Genzano
10		Mariano Tallaferro	19 December 1974 (aged 25)			(Italy) Delfino Cagliari
11		Leonardo Magarelli (captain)	21 August 1974 (aged 26)			(Argentina) Atlanta
12	GK	José Mandayo	18 June 1978 (aged 22)			(Argentina) Franja de Oro
13	DF	Fernando Wilhelm	5 April 1982 (aged 18)			(Argentina) Club Glorias
14		Marcelo Gimenez	29 January 1977 (aged 23)			(Argentina) Franja de Oro
