= 2017–18 Liga Sport Zone =

Liga Portuguesa de Futsal
- Season: 2017–18
- Dates: 9 September 2017 – 30 June 2018
- Champions: Sporting CP; 15th title
- Relegated: Fabril Barreiro; CD Aves
- UEFA Futsal Champions League: Sporting CP; Benfica
- Matches: 200
- Goals: 1,357 (6.79 per match)
- Top goalscorer: Rodolfo Fortino (33 goals)

The 2017–18 season of the Liga Portuguesa de Futsal was the 28th season of top-tier futsal in Portugal. It was named Liga Sport Zone for sponsorship reasons. The regular season started on September 9, 2017, and ended on May 5, 2018. After the end of the regular season, the top eight teams played the championship playoffs.

Sporting CP won the competition for the third time in a row, matching the two best runs in the history of the competition.

== Teams ==
Location of teams in Liga Sport Zone 2016–17

Team	Location	Stadium	Capacity
CD Aves	Vila das Aves	Pavilhão do Clube Desportivo das Aves	1000
Belenenses	Lisbon	Pavilhão Acácio Rosa	1683
Benfica	Lisbon	Pavilhão Fidelidade	2400
Braga/AAUM	Braga	Pavilhão Desportivo Universitário de Gualtar	1740
Burinhosa	Burinhosa	Pavilhão Gimnodesportivo da Burinhosa	300
Fabril Barreiro	Barreiro	Pavilhão Vítor Domingos	1500
Fundão	Fundão	Pavilhão Municipal do Fundão	1056
Futsal Azeméis	Oliveira de Azeméis	Pavilhão Municipal de Oliveira de Azeméis	250
Leões Porto Salvo	Porto Salvo	Pavilhão dos Leões de Porto Salvo	700
Modicus Sandim	Sandim	Pavilhão do Modicus	700
Quinta dos Lombos	Quinta dos Lombos	Pavilhão Desportivo dos Lombos	650
Rio Ave	Vila do Conde	Pavilhão de Desportos de Vila do Conde	800
Sporting CP	Lisbon	Pavilhão João Rocha	3000
Unidos Pinheirense	Valbom	Pavilhão Municipal de Valbom	500

== League table ==
P	Team	Pts	Pld	W	D	L	GF	GA	GD	Qualification or relegation
1	Sporting CP	76	26	25	1	0	143	31	+112	Title Playoffs
2	Benfica	70	26	23	1	2	147	43	+104	Title Playoffs
3	Braga/AAUM	50	26	15	5	6	86	59	+27	Title Playoffs
4	Modicus Sandim	43	26	13	4	9	123	101	+22	Title Playoffs
5	Fundão	37	26	11	4	11	71	69	+2	Title Playoffs
6	Futsal Azeméis	37	26	11	4	11	87	102	-15	Title Playoffs
7	Quinta dos Lombos	32	26	9	5	12	70	101	-31	Title Playoffs
8	Burinhosa	31	26	9	4	13	70	89	-19	Title Playoffs
9	Rio Ave	30	26	9	3	14	80	101	-21	
10	Unidos Pinheirense	29	26	10	2	14	56	105	-49	
11	Belenenses	28	26	8	4	14	71	86	-15	
12	Leões Porto Salvo	27	26	8	3	15	89	95	-6	
13	Fabril Barreiro	22	26	6	4	16	99	146	-47	Relegation
14	CD Aves	8	26	2	2	22	46	110	-64	Relegation

== Title Playoffs ==
Quarterfinals
1	Sporting CP	4	3*(2p)
8	Burinhosa	2	3 (0p)
4	Modicus Sandim	2	3	2*(2p)
5	Fundão	4	1	2 (0p)
2	Benfica	4	6
7	Quinta dos Lombos	2	1
3	Braga/AAUM	3*(3p)	7
6	Futsal Azeméis	3 (1p)	0

Semifinals
1	Sporting CP	2	4
4	Modicus Sandim	0	0
2	Benfica	3	2
3	Braga/AAUM	2	1

Finals
1	Sporting CP	5	2	6 (0p)	5 (0)**(2p)	2 (1)**(2p)
2	Benfica	4	3	6*(3p)	5 (0) (0p)	2 (1) (0p)

Extra Time = *

Penalty shootout = **

== See also ==
- Futsal in Portugal
