= 2009–10 Campeonato Nacional da 1ª Divisão de Futsal =

Portuguese Futsal First Division
- Season: 2009–10
- Champions: Sporting CP
- Relegated: Vila Verde & Onze Unidos
- UEFA Futsal Cup: Sporting CP

The 2009–10 season of the Portuguese Futsal First Division is the 20th season of top-tier futsal in Portugal.

== League table ==
P	Team	Pts	Pld	W	D	L	GF	GA	GD	Qualification or relegation
1	Sporting CP	65	26	21	2	3	137	65	+72	Title Play-off
2	Belenenses	65	26	20	5	1	117	51	+66	Title Play-off
3	Benfica	61	26	19	4	3	124	56	+68	Title Play-off
4	Instituto D. João V	45	26	14	3	9	97	76	+21	Title Play-off
5	Freixieiro	45	26	14	3	9	109	93	+16	Title Play-off
6	Fundão	40	26	11	7	8	72	64	+8	Title Play-off
7	GD Boticas	36	26	11	3	12	111	109	+2	Title Play-off
8	Alpendorada	36	26	11	3	12	76	84	-8	Title Play-off
9	Fundação Jorge Antunes	34	26	9	7	10	72	80	-8	
10	Mogadouro	31	25	10	1	14	89	109	-20	
11	S.L. Olivais	26	26	8	2	16	84	92	-8	
12	AAUTAD/Real Fut	15	26	3	6	17	62	120	-58	
13	Vila Verde	10	26	3	1	22	64	127	-63	Relegation
14	Onze Unidos	9	25	2	3	20	63	151	-88	Relegation

Note: Round 16: Mogadouro - Onze Unidos was suspended due to incidents between players in the pitch. The game was declared lost for both clubs (0-3)

== Title playoffs ==
Quarter-finals
6	Fundão	4* (11p)	4	2
3	Benfica	4* (12p)	2	4
7	Boticas	3	3
2	Belenenses	5	4
8	Alpendorada	2*(6p)	1	1
1	Sporting	2*(4p)	6	6
5	Freixieiro	5	3
4	Instituto	8	4

Semi-finals
3	Benfica	3	3
2	Belenenses	1	1
4	Instituto	1	3*
1	Sporting	3	4*

Final
1	Sporting	4	3	4* (9p)	5*
3	Benfica	3	4	4* (7p)	3*

Extra Time = *

== See also ==
- Futsal in Portugal
