= Teka (futsal player) =

Portuguese futsal player

Personal information
- Full name: César André Costa Dias
- Date of birth: 7 July 1991 (age 35)
- Place of birth: Amadora, Portugal
- Height: 1.75 m (5 ft 9 in)
- Position: Winger

Team information
- Current team: Fundão
- Number: 4

Youth career
- 2005–2007: Presa Casal Rato
- 2007–2010: Sporting CP

Senior career*
Years	Team	Apps	(Gls)
2010–2014	Benfica		
2013–2014	→ SL Olivais (loan)		
2014–	Fundão		
- * Club domestic league appearances and goals as of 20 September 2012

César André Costa Dias (born 7 July 1991), known as Teka, is a Portuguese futsal player who plays for Benfica as a winger.

== Career ==
Born in Amadora, he started competing in futsal at Presa Casal Rato, representing them for two seasons, before joining Sporting CP at age 16.

In the summer of 2010, Teka was tested by Paulo Fernandes in the preseason trainings, signing a one-year deal on 3 September 2010. The 20-year-old renewed his contract on 29 July 2011, and helped the club win a league and cup double.

After sustaining an ACL knee injury in November 2012, Teka was loaned out for the 2013-14 season to SL Olivais. On 18 June 2014, he joined Fundão, which had just won its first Portuguese Cup, a month earlier.

== Honours ==
SL Benfica

- Liga Portuguesa de Futsal: 2011–12
- Taça de Portugal de Futsal: 2011–12
- SuperTaça de Futsal de Portugal: 2010–11, 2011–12
