= 2015–16 Taça da Liga de Futsal =

Tournament details
- Country: Portugal
- Teams: 8

Final positions
- Champions: Sporting CP (1)
- Runners-up: AD Fundão

Tournament statistics
- Matches played: 7
- Goals scored: 35 (5 per match)

The 2015–16 Taça da Liga de Futsal was the inaugural edition of the Taça da Liga de Futsal. The competition was disputed between 7 and 10 January 2016. For this edition, the 8 best ranked teams at the end of the regular phase first half of 2015–16 National League. The games were played on Pavilhão Dr. Salvador Machado at Oliveira de Azeméis in a final-eight format.

== Fixtures ==
Quarterfinals
Sporting CP	4
Burinhosa	3
Braga/AAUM	3
Modicus	3
Benfica	0
AD Fundão	1
Olivais	3
Belenenses	1

Semifinals
Sporting CP	5
Modicus	2
AD Fundão	5
Olivais	3

Finals
Sporting CP	2
AD Fundão	0

=== Final ===
The final was played on 10 January at the Pavilhão Dr. Salvador Machado in Oliveira de Azeméis.

May 10, 2016	Sporting CP	2–0	AD Fundão	Oliveira de Azeméis
17:45 (UTC+0)	Cavinato, Cavinato			Stadium: Pavilhão Dr. Salvador Machado

2015–16 Taça da Liga de Futsal
(Lisbon)
Sporting CP
First title

== See also ==
- Liga Portuguesa de Futsal
- Taça de Portugal de Futsal
