= Bruno Coelho =

Portuguese futsal player

Bruno Coelho ComIH ComM
Personal information
- Full name: Bruno Alexandre Dias Coelho
- Date of birth: 1 August 1987 (age 39)
- Place of birth: Sintra, Portugal
- Height: 1.70 m (5 ft 7 in)
- Position: Winger

Youth career
- 2002–2005: JOMA
- 2005–2006: Vila Verde

Senior career*
Years	Team	Apps	(Gls)
2006–2009	Vila Verde		
2009–2010	Olivais		
2010–2011	Belenenses		
2011–2020	Benfica	146	(69)
2020–2021	ACCS	21	(12)
2021–	FF Napoli		

International career^{‡}
2010–	Portugal	130	(43)
Medal record
Men's futsal
Representing Portugal
UEFA Futsal Championship
Runner-up	2026 Latvia / Lithuania / Slovenia
- * Club domestic league appearances and goals as of 1 March 2020 ‡ National team caps and goals as of 14 September 2019

Bruno Alexandre Dias Coelho ComIH ComM (born 1 August 1987) is a Portuguese futsal player who plays as a winger for FF Napoli, and for the Portugal national team. Coelho scored Portugal's winning goal in UEFA Futsal Euro 2018 final. He also has over 100 caps.

== Honours ==
=== Club ===
Benfica

- Campeonato Nacional: 2011-12, 2014–15, 2018–19
- Taça de Portugal: 2011-12, 2014–15 2018-19
- Taça da Liga: 2017–18, 2018–19, 2019–20
- Supertaça de Portugal: 2011, 2012, 2015, 2016

ACCS Asnières Villeneuve 92

- Championnat de France de Futsal: 2020-2021

=== International ===
- UEFA Futsal Championship: 2018, 2022
- FIFA Futsal World Cup: 2021

Individual

- UEFA Futsal Euro 2018 Silver Shoe

=== Orders ===
- Commander of the Order of Prince Henry
- Commander of the Order of Merit
