= Pauleta (futsal player) =

Portuguese futsal player

Personal information
- Full name: Paulo César Vaz Mendes
- Date of birth: 12 June 1994 (age 32)
- Place of birth: São Domingos de Rana, Portugal
- Position: Winger

Team information
- Current team: Sporting CP
- Number: 6

Youth career
- 2002–2011: Leões Porto Salvo
- 2011–2013: Belenenses

Senior career*
Years	Team	Apps	(Gls)
2013–2015	Belenenses	35	(9)
2015–2017	Leões Porto Salvo	50	(30)
2017–2019	AD Fundão	55	(28)
2019–	Sporting CP		

International career^{‡}
	Portugal U21	8	(4)
2018–	Portugal	7	(2)
Medal record
Men's futsal
Representing Portugal
UEFA Futsal Championship
Runner-up	2026 Latvia / Lithuania / Slovenia
- * Club domestic league appearances and goals as of 00:00, 20 February 2021 (UTC) ‡ National team caps and goals as of 00:00, 20 February 2021 (UTC)

Paulo César Vaz Mendes (born 12 June 1994), known as Pauleta, is a Portuguese professional futsal player who plays for Sporting CP and the Portugal national team as a winger.

== Personal life ==
Born in Portugal, Pauleta is of Cape Verdean descent.

== Honours ==
=== Clubes ===
Sporting

- Liga Portuguesa: 2020–21, 2021–22, 2022–23
- Taça de Portugal: 2019–20, 2021–22
- Taça da Liga de Futsal: 2020–21, 2021–22
- Supertaça de Futsal: 2021, 2022, 2025
- UEFA Futsal Champions League: 2020–21

=== International ===
Portugal

- FIFA Futsal World Cup: 2021
- UEFA Futsal Championship: 2022
- Futsal Finalissima: 2022
