= André Sousa (futsal player) =

Portuguese futsal player

Personal information
- Full name: André Melo Bandeira Almeida Sousa
- Date of birth: 25 February 1986 (age 40)
- Place of birth: Coimbra, Portugal
- Height: 1.68 m (5 ft 6 in)
- Position: Goalkeeper

Team information
- Current team: Benfica
- Number: 12

Youth career
- 1994–1999: Académica (football)
- 1999–2000: Académica
- 2000–2001: CF Santa Clara
- 2001–2005: Académica

Senior career*
Years	Team	Apps	(Gls)
2005–2007	Académica		
2007–2011	Instituto D. João V		
2011–2012	Académica		
2012	CD Operário		
2013–2014	AD Fundão		
2014–2019	Sporting	76	(6)
2019–	Benfica	32	(1)

International career^{‡}
2009–	Portugal	113	(2)
- * Club domestic league appearances and goals as of 00:00, 31 August 2019 (UTC) ‡ National team caps and goals as of 13 September 2022

André Melo Bandeira Almeida Sousa (born 25 February 1986) is a Portuguese futsal player who plays for Benfica and the Portugal national team as a goalkeeper.

== Honours ==
Fundão

- Taça de Portugal: 2013–14

Sporting CP

- Campeonato Nacional: 2015–16, 2016–17, 2017–18
- Taça de Portugal: 2015–16, 2017–18, 2018–19
- Taça da Liga: 2016–17
- Supertaça de Portugal: 2017, 2018
- UEFA Futsal Champions League: 2018–19

Benfica

- Taça de Portugal: 2022–23
- Taça da Liga: 2019–20, 2022–23
- Supertaça de Portugal: 2023

International

- UEFA Futsal Championship: 2018, 2022
- FIFA Futsal World Cup: 2021
- Futsal Finalissima: 2022
