= Marinho (futsal player) =

Portuguese futsal player

Personal information
- Full name: Mário Claúdio Nogueira Carreiras
- Date of birth: 30 March 1985 (age 41)
- Place of birth: Porto, Portugal
- Height: 1.76 m (5 ft 9 1/2 in)
- Position: Winger

Team information
- Current team: Novaya Generatsiya

Youth career
- Fatigados
- Boavista

Senior career*
Years	Team	Apps	(Gls)
2005–2009	Jorge Antunes		
2009–2013	Benfica		
2013–2014	Luparense		
2014–2015	Novaya Generatsiya		
2015–	Braga/AAUM	87	(30)

International career^{‡}
2005–2014	Portugal	92	(33)
- * Club domestic league appearances and goals as of 8 December 2014 ‡ National team caps and goals as of 4 July 2016

Mário Claúdio Nogueira Carreiras (born 30 March 1985), known as Marinho, is a Portuguese futsal player who plays as a winger for Braga/AAUM and the Portugal national team.

In July 2013, Marinho left Benfica and joined Italian side Luparense.

== Honours ==
Benfica

- UEFA Futsal Cup: 2009–10
- Liga Portuguesa: 2011–12
- Taça de Portugal: 2011–12
- Supertaça de Portugal: 2009, 2011, 20112
