= Vítor Hugo (futsal player, born 1982) =

Portuguese futsal player

Vítor Hugo ComIH ComM
Personal information
- Full name: Vítor Hugo Fernandes Moreira
- Date of birth: 30 November 1982 (age 43)
- Place of birth: Porto, Portugal
- Height: 1.84 m (6 ft 0 in)
- Position: Goalkeeper

Team information
- Current team: Braga/AAUM
- Number: 16

Youth career
- 1997–2001: Boavista

Senior career*
| Years | Team | Apps | (Gls) |
| 2001–2004 | Boavista | | |
| 2004–2010 | Jorge Antunes | 24 | |
| 2010–2012 | Benfica | 11 | |
| 2012–2014 | Rio Ave | 19 | (2) |
| 2014– | Braga/AAUM | 178 | (11) |

International career^{‡}
| 2007– | Portugal | 78 | (1) |
- * Club domestic league appearances and goals ‡ National team caps and goals as of 00:00, 6 October 2018 (UTC)

Vítor Hugo Fernandes Moreira ComIH ComM (born 30 November 1982) is a Portuguese futsal player who plays as a goalkeeper for Braga/AAUM and the Portugal national team.

== Honours ==
=== Club ===
Benfica

- Liga Portuguesa: 2011–12
- Taça de Portugal: 2011–12
- Supertaça de Portugal: 2011

=== International ===
Portugal

- UEFA Futsal Championship: 2018
- FIFA Futsal World Cup: 2021

=== Orders ===
- Commander of the Order of Prince Henry
- Commander of the Order of Merit
