= Bebé (futsal player, born 1983) =

Portuguese futsal player

Personal information
- Full name: Euclides Gomes Vaz
- Date of birth: 19 May 1983 (age 43)
- Place of birth: Lisbon, Portugal
- Height: 1.73 m (5 ft 8 in)
- Position: Goalkeeper

Youth career
- 2001–2002: Os Económicos

Senior career*
Years	Team	Apps	(Gls)
2002–2003	Os Económicos		
2003	GD Castelo		
2003–2006	Sporting CP	57	(0)
2006–2017	Benfica	163	(2)
2017–2022	Leões Porto Salvo	27	(1)

International career^{‡}
2005–2022	Portugal	136	(0)
- * Club domestic league appearances and goals as of 30 January 2022 ‡ National team caps and goals as of 30 January 2022

Euclides Gomes Vaz (born 19 May 1983), known as Bebé, is a Portuguese former futsal player who played as a goalkeeper and also played for the Portugal national team.

== Personal life ==
Born in Portugal, Bebé is of Cape Verdean descent.

== Honours ==
=== Club ===
Sporting CP

- Liga Portuguesa: 2003–04, 2005–06
- Taça de Portugal: 2005–06
- Supertaça de Portugal: 2004

Benfica

- Liga Portuguesa: 2006–07, 2007–08, 2008–09, 2011–12, 2014–15
- Taça de Portugal: 2006–07, 2008–09, 2011–12, 2014–15, 2016–17
- Supertaça de Portugal: 2007, 2009, 2011, 2012, 2015, 2016
- UEFA Futsal Cup: 2009–10

=== International ===
Portugal

- FIFA Futsal World Cup: 2021
- UEFA Futsal Championship: 2018, 2022
