= Torugo =

Portuguese futsal player

Vítor Hugo
Personal information
- Full name: Vítor Hugo Rosário; Mendes Correia
- Date of birth: 20 May 1984 (age 42)
- Place of birth: Lisbon, Portugal
- Height: 1.75 m (5 ft 9 in)
- Position: Defender

Senior career*
Years	Team	Apps	(Gls)
2007–2009	UP Venda Nova		
2009–2011	AMSAC		
2011–2012	Leões de Porto Salvo		
2012–2015	Benfica		
2015–2016	Catanzaro		
2016–	Olho Marinho		

International career^{‡}
2013	Portugal	2	(1)
- * Club domestic league appearances and goals as of 2 June 2013 ‡ National team caps and goals as of 2 June 2013

Vítor Hugo Rosário Mendes Correia (born 20 May 1984), also known as Torugo, is a Portuguese futsal player who plays as a defender for Olho Marinho and the Portugal national team.

== Career ==
Born in Lisbon, Vitor Hugo started his career in amateur club, União e Progresso da Venda Nova, competing there from age 23 to age 25. In 2009, he moved to Associação de Moradores de Santo António dos Cavaleiros, in the Santo António dos Cavaleiros e Frielas parish.

He arrived at first tier to 2011, to represent Leões de Porto Salvo, where he quickly caught the attention of Benfica, which signed him for the following season. At Benfica, Vítor Hugo won a supercup in his first year, but suffered a fractured tibia on a match against Sporting on 16 June 2013. He was sidelined for 21 months, reappearing on 11 March 2015, helping the club win the league and Portuguese cup, before leaving the club on 17 June 2015.

After a brief spell in Italy, at Catanzaro, he returned to Portugal to play for Olho Marinho in the second tier.

== Honours ==
Benfica

- Liga Portuguesa: 2014–15
- Taça de Portugal: 2014–15
- Supertaça de Portugal: 2012
