= Bibi (futsal player) =

Portuguese futsal player (born 1980)

Personal information
- Full name: Emanuel Luís Marques Walter de Magalhães
- Date of birth: 28 May 1980 (age 46)
- Place of birth: Lisbon, Portugal
- Height: 1.74 m (5 ft 9 in)
- Position: Defender

Youth career
- 1998–1999: Vale de Milhaços

Senior career*
Years	Team	Apps	(Gls)
1999–2000	Piedense		
2000–2001	Correio da Manhã		
2001–2009	Sporting CP	194	(83)
2009	SL Olivais		
2010	Belenenses		
2010–2011	Venezia		
2012	Caja Segovia		
2013	CD Operário		
2013–2014	Vale Cavala		
2014–2015	Sta. Marta do Pinhal		
2016–2017	Montesilvano		

International career^{‡}
2001	Portugal U23	2	(0)
2002	Portugal B	1	(0)
2001–2008	Portugal	22	(4)
- * Club domestic league appearances and goals as of 00:00, 25 October 2018 (UTC) ‡ National team caps and goals as of 00:00, 25 October 2018 (UTC)

Emanuel Luís Marques Walter de Magalhães (born 28 May 1980), commonly known as Bibi, is a Portuguese former futsal player who played as a defender. Bibi won two Portuguese futsal leagues with Sporting CP and played for the Portugal national team in the 2008 World Cup.
