= Tunha =

Portuguese futsal player

Personal information
- Full name: Carlos Jorge Fortes Magalhães Medina Vasconcelos
- Date of birth: 24 October 1984 (age 42)
- Place of birth: Lisbon, Portugal
- Height: 1.77 m (5 ft 10 in)
- Position: Pivot

Team information
- Current team: Torreense
- Number: 77

Youth career
- 1995–1996: CAC (football)
- 1998–1999: Charneca (football)
- 1999–2000: Sporting da Torre (football)
- 2000–2001: Ramiro José
- 2002–2003: Academia do Lumiar

Senior career*
Years	Team	Apps	(Gls)
2003–2004	Atlético Odivelas		
2004–2005	GD Castelo		
2005–2006	AMSAC		
2006	Ereira		
2007	Os Torpedos		
2007–2008	Ismailitas		
2008–2010	Sacavenense		
2010–2014	SL Olivais		
2014–2015	Leões Porto Salvo	23	(18)
2015–2016	AD Fundão	28	(6)
2016–2018	Belenenses	49	(14)
2018–2019	Burinhosa	25	(12)
2019–2020	Belenenses	19	(6)
2020–	Torreense		

International career^{‡}
2017–2019	Portugal	18	(2)
- * Club domestic league appearances and goals as of 00:00, 20 February 2021 (UTC) ‡ National team caps and goals as of 00:00, 20 February 2021 (UTC)

Carlos Jorge Fortes Magalhães Medina Vasconcelos (born 24 October 1984), commonly known as Tunha or Tunha Lam, is a Portuguese professional futsal player who plays for Torreense and the Portugal national team as a pivot.
