= Nuno Dias =

Portuguese futsal coach

Personal information
- Full name: Nuno Sérgio dos Santos Dias
- Date of birth: 28 December 1972 (age 53)
- Place of birth: Cantanhede, Portugal

Team information
- Current team: Sporting CP (head coach)

Managerial career
- Years: Team
- 2006-2011: Instituto D. João V
- 2012-: Sporting CP

Nuno Sérgio dos Santos Dias (born 28 December 1972) is a Portuguese futsal coach who currently manages Sporting Clube de Portugal.

== Honours ==
=== Manager ===
(Portugal) Sporting CP

- UEFA Futsal Champions League: 3
- Portuguese Futsal League: 9
- Portuguese Futsal Cup: 7
- Portuguese Futsal League Cup: 6
- Portuguese Futsal Super Cup: 7
