= Ludgero Lopes =

Portuguese futsal player

Personal information
- Full name: António Ludgero Carvalho Pina Lopes
- Date of birth: 17 August 1997 (age 29)
- Place of birth: Portugal
- Height: 1.91 m (6 ft 3 in)
- Position: Pivot

Team information
- Current team: Quinta dos Lombos
- Number: 10

Youth career
- 2007–2011: Shotokai Queluz
- 2011–2012: Sporting CP
- 2012–2013: Real Massamá (football)
- 2013–2016: Sporting CP

Senior career*
Years	Team	Apps	(Gls)
2016	Sporting CP	4	(0)
2016–2017	AEL Limassol		
2017–2018	Braga/AAUM	37	(17)
2018–2021	Quinta dos Lombos	71	(65)
2021	Modicus	6	(1)
2022	Leões Porto Salvo	14	(7)
2022	Portimonense	7	(0)
2023	KS Constract Lubawa	22	(22)

International career^{‡}
2016–	Portugal U19	2	(1)
2016–	Portugal U21	8	(7)
2019–	Portugal	2	(0)
- * Club domestic league appearances and goals as of 00:00, 7 August 2018 (UTC) ‡ National team caps and goals as of 00:00, 5 July 2019 (UTC)

António Ludgero Carvalho Pina Lopes (born 17 August 1997), is a Portuguese futsal player who plays for KS Constract Lubawa and the Portugal national team.
