= G.D. Fabril =

Portuguese association football club

Fabril Barreiro
- Full name: Grupo Desportivo Fabril
- Short name: Fabril
- Founded: 27 January 1937; 89 years ago
- Ground: Estádio Alfredo da Silva, Barreiro, Portugal
- Capacity: 21,498
- Chairman: Faustino Mestre
- Manager: João Miguel Parreira
- League: Campeonato de Portugal
- 2024-25: Campeonato de Portugal
- Website: http://www.grupodesportivofabril.pt/
Home colours	Away colours

Grupo Desportivo Fabril is a Portuguese sports club established as Grupo Desportivo CUF do Barreiro (commonly known as CUF Barreiro), with CUF standing for the company Companhia União Fabril. A multisports club best known for its football section, it was founded as a works team in the city of Barreiro, District of Setúbal, on 27 January 1937. CUF Barreiro's greatest achievement was a third place in the 1964–65 Portuguese Liga season. The club's football home ground is the Complexo Desportivo Alfredo da Silva, which was inaugurated in June 1965 and named after Alfredo da Silva, an entrepreneur who was the founder of CUF.

Besides football, Fabril's futsal team has reached top-flight twice in their history, participating in the Liga Sport Zone in the 2012–13 and 2016–17 seasons. In the 2012–13 season, Fabril reached the 5th round of the Taça de Portugal.

== History ==
Established as Grupo Desportivo da CUF (G.D. CUF, with CUF standing for the company Companhia União Fabril) in 1937, it also was known as CUF Barreiro, it was one of three football clubs created by the parent company, whose players were also workers (the other clubs were CUF Lisboa, founded in 1936 and now known as Unidos de Lisboa, and the short-lived CUF Porto, that existed between 1945 and 1950). In 1940, the Estado Novo forced the club to change its name, as it didn't allow sports teams with corporate names. Thus the club changed its name to Unidos Futebol Clube or Unidos do Barreiro (CUF Lisboa, meanwhile changed to Clube de Futebol Os Unidos or Unidos de Lisboa). The original name returned in 1944. After the Carnation Revolution, a military coup in April 1974, the club was renamed Grupo Desportivo Quimigal.

The club changed its name several times during its history:

- 1937 : The club was founded under the name Grupo Desportivo CUF do Barreiro
- 1940 : The club is renamed as the Unidos Futebol Clube do Barreiro
- 1944 : The club is renamed again as the Grupo Desportivo CUF do Barreiro
- 1978 : The club is renamed as the Grupo Desportivo Quimigal do Barreiro
- 2000 : The club is renamed as the Grupo Desportivo Fabril do Barreiro

=== Timeline ===
- 1937 – Grupo Desportivo da CUF (CUF Sporting Club) is founded on 27 January. CUF (Companhia União Fabril) was a soap and chemical manufacturer founded by Alfredo da Silva.
- 1939 – Joaquim Fernandes, a G.D. CUF cyclist, wins the Volta a Portugal.
- 1942–43 – The senior football team participates for first time in the first division, only managing to stay one season. Also that year, Alfredo da Silva dies.
- 1953–54 – The football team wins the second division and is promoted to the first division again, ushering a golden era for the club. The most important players were Barriga, Vasques, Luís, Sérgio, Aureliano, André, Carreira (captain), Orlando, Matos, Vale and Velhinho and the coach was João Mário. The club would remain in the first division for the next 22 years. That same year, the junior team became vice-champions of the first division losing in the final against Academica Coimbra.
- 1964–65 – The football team achieved its highest position to date in the first division reaching the third place among 14 teams, qualifying for a European competition, the Inter-Cities Fairs Cup (now UEFA Europa League, formerly UEFA Cup until 2009), the first time. The rink hockey would perform even better, becoming national champions.
- 1965–66 – The Alfredo da Silva stadium is inaugurated leaving their former stadium, Santa Bárbara. In the Inter-Cities Fairs Cup, after a walkover in the first round, the team is eliminated by A.C. Milan after three games (2–0, 0–2, 0–1). The team would make two more appearances in the competition in 67/68 (1R) and in 72/73 (2R). The rink hockey team was eliminated from the Champions League in the first round by Reus Deportiu with a 1–4, 0–3 score.
- 1968–69 – Football team reach the semifinals of the Taça de Portugal, only to lose 7–2 on aggregate to eventual champions Benfica.
- 1972 – Víctor Domingos, the CUF and rink hockey national team goalkeeper, is considered the best player in the world in that position.
- 1972–73 – Football team reaches the Taça de Portugal semifinals again, only to lose to the other big Lisbon team, Sporting, 0–1 at home. Again, Sporting goes on to win the entire competition.
- 1974 – Carnation Revolution. During the communist-inspired period known as PREC, the company CUF, one of the largest conglomerates of Portugal, is nationalized.
- 1975–76 – After 22 consecutive years in the first division, G.D. CUF is relegated to the second division after finishing in the 16th and last position. From then on, the football club would disappear into the lower divisions, never returning to the first division.
- 1980–81 – The club changes its name to Grupo Desportivo da Quimigal.
- 1991–92 – After decades in the professional divisions, the club fell into the Setúbal District Division.
- 1999-00 – Quimigal wins the Setúbal District Championship, but would be relegated again in the next year. At the end of the season the club's name changed to its current name, Grupo Desportivo Fabril.
- 2002–03 – The club wins the Setúbal District Championship again, only to be relegated again.
- 2006–07 – The club once again wins the Setúbal District Championship.
- 2012–13 – Tercera Divisão is disbanded, sending most of the clubs (excepting those promoted to the new Campeonato Nacional de Seniores, after the merger between the II Divisão and the 3ª Divisão) including Fabril, back to their district championships.
- 2013–14 – The club once again wins the Setúbal District Championship and is promoted to the Campeonato Nacional.

	Presences
Primeira Liga (First League)	23
Liga de Honra (League of Honour)	–
Segunda Divisão (Second Division)	21
Terceira Divisão	14
Taça de Portugal (Portuguese Cup)	?

== Sports ==
- Athletics
- Football
- Futsal
- Gymnastics
- Rink Hockey
- Judo
- Rowing
- Tennis

== Football ==
=== Honours ===
- Portuguese Liga: 3rd place – 1964–65
- Portuguese Cup: Semi-Final – 1968–69, 1972–73
- Portuguese Second Division: Champion – 1953–54
- AF Setúbal First Division: Champion – 1999–00, 2002–03, 2006–07, 2013–14, 2018–19
- Inter-Cities Fairs Cup/UEFA Cup: 2nd Round – 1965–66, 1972–73
- Intertoto Cup: 1974

=== League and cup history ===
Season		Pos.	Pl.	W	D	L	GS	GA	P	Cup	Europe		Notes
1942–1943	1D	9	18	5	1	12	46	77	11	QF			
...
1947–1948	?	?	?	?	?	?	?	?	?	1/8			
1948–1949	?	?	?	?	?	?	?	?	?	1/8			
...
1954–1955	1D	7	26	10	5	11	45	52	25	1/16			
1955–1956	1D	10	26	6	8	12	33	58	20	1/16			
1956–1957	1D	9	26	9	3	4	35	69	21	1/8			
1957–1958	1D	12	26	8	3	15	40	59	19	1/8			
1958–1959	1D	11	26	8	5	13	34	55	21	-			
1959–1960	1D	5	26	10	5	11	36	39	25	1/32			
1960–1961	1D	6	26	10	6	10	38	28	26	1/8			
1961–1962	1D	4	26	14	5	7	44	34	33	1/16			
1962–1963	1D	12	26	6	6	14	37	40	18	1/16			
1963–1964	1D	5	26	12	6	8	46	33	30	QF			
1964–1965	1D	3	26	15	5	6	49	29	35	1/8			best classification ever
1965–1966	1D	9	26	8	8	10	37	46	24	1/8	FC	2nd Round	
1966–1967	1D	8	26	9	5	12	27	43	23	1/16			
1967–1968	1D	11	26	7	7	12	28	37	21	1/32	FC	1st Round	
1968–1969	1D	7	26	8	11	7	32	30	27	SF			
1969–1970	1D	8	26	9	5	12	24	38	23	1/16			
1970–1971	1D	8	26	8	5	13	28	37	21	1/16			
1971–1972	1D	4	30	12	13	5	43	28	37	1/16			
1972–1973	1D	8	30	11	8	11	38	37	30	SF	UC	2nd round	
1973–1974	1D	8	30	8	9	13	33	44	25	QF			
1974–1975	1D	8	30	10	9	11	41	41	29	1/8			
1975–1976	1D	16	30	4	10	16	15	50	18	1/16			relegated
1976–1977	?	?	?	?	?	?	?	?	?	QF			
1977–1978	?	?	?	?	?	?	?	?	?	1/32			
1978–1979	?	?	?	?	?	?	?	?	?	1/32			
1979–1980	?	?	?	?	?	?	?	?	?	1/64			
1980–1981	?	?	?	?	?	?	?	?	?	1/128			
1981–1982	?	?	?	?	?	?	?	?	?	1/64			
1982–1983	?	?	?	?	?	?	?	?	?	1/16			
1983–1984	?	?	?	?	?	?	?	?	?	1/128			
1984–1985	?	?	?	?	?	?	?	?	?	1/128			
1985–1986	?	?	?	?	?	?	?	?	?	1/128			
1986–1987	?	?	?	?	?	?	?	?	?	1/128			
1987–1988	?	?	?	?	?	?	?	?	?	1/64			
1988–1989	?	?	?	?	?	?	?	?	?	1/128			
1989–1990	?	?	?	?	?	?	?	?	?	1/32			
1990–1991	?	?	?	?	?	?	?	?	?	1/128			
1991–1992	3D	?	?	?	?	?	?	?	?	1/256			
...
2000–2001	3D	?	?	?	?	?	?	?	?	1/256			
...
2007–2008	3D	4	26	12	8	6	38	25	40	1/128			

1D = First Division

3D = Third Division

FC = Fairs Cup

UC = UEFA Cup

=== International performance ===
As CUF Barreiro, the club has made three official appearances in international football competitions:

Season	Competition	Round	Club	Score
1965–66	Inter-Cities Fairs Cup	2R	(Italy) AC Milan	2–0, 0–2, 0–1
1967–68	Inter-Cities Fairs Cup	1R	(Socialist Federal Republic of Yugoslavia) Vojvodina Novi Sad	0–1, 1–3
1972–73	UEFA Cup	1R	(Belgium) Racing White	1–0, 2–0
1972–73	UEFA Cup	2R	(Germany) 1. FC Kaiserslautern	1–3, 1–0
1973–74	Intertoto Cup	Gr.3	(Germany) Hertha Berlin	0–0, 0–1; 2nd
1973–74	Intertoto Cup	Gr.3	(Sweden) Malmö FF	4–0, 0–1
1973–74	Intertoto Cup	Gr.3	(Switzerland) Grasshopper	3–0, 4–1
1974–75	Intertoto Cup	Gr.10	(Sweden) Landskrona	1–0, 1–1; Winner
1974–75	Intertoto Cup	Gr.10	(Turkey) Altay S.K.	2–0, 1–2
1974–75	Intertoto Cup	Gr.10	(Sweden) Hammarby IF	1–0, 2–2

== Futsal ==
Fabril has a futsal team that has played top tier futsal in the Liga Sport Zone.

=== Honours ===
- I Divisão: 9th place (relegated through the Relegation Playout; 3rd place) – 2012–13

== Current squad ==
As of 9 May 2020

Note: Flags indicate national team as defined under FIFA eligibility rules; some limited exceptions apply. Players may hold more than one non-FIFA nationality.

No.	Pos.	Nation	Player
1	GK	POR	João Crespo
2	DF	ANG	Valdo Wilson
4	DF	POR	Janita
5	MF	POR	Miguel Pimenta
6	MF	POR	Crisanto Silva
7	FW	POR	Miguel Correia
8	MF	CPV	Nelson Cruz
9	FW	BRA	Jackson Souza
10	FW	POR	Cajó Conceição
11	FW	POR	Daniel Lourenço
12	DF	POR	Diogo Vilela
13	MF	POR	Bruno Elias
16	DF	POR	Rúben Tavares
18	DF	POR	Rafael Matos
19	FW	CPV	Ailton Moreira

No.	Pos.	Nation	Player
20	MF	POR	Iddy Embaló
21	MF	POR	Diogo Palma
27	DF	POR	Fábio Freitas
28	MF	POR	Miguel Flor
29	GK	ANG	Nilton Paulo
30	MF	POR	Diogo Semedo
31	MF	POR	João Vasco
93	GK	POR	Kevin Bernardeco
—	GK	POR	Marco Mosca
—	DF	POR	André Amaral
—	DF	POR	André Esteves
—	DF	BRA	Odilon Jr.
—	MF	POR	Rafael Bastos
—	MF	POR	André Flôr
—	FW	POR	Rúben Nicolau

== See also ==
- Companhia União Fabril
