= Tiago Soares =

Portuguese futsal player

Personal information
- Full name: Tiago André Magalhães Soares
- Date of birth: 9 November 1988 (age 37)
- Place of birth: Gondomar, Portugal
- Height: 1.72 m (5 ft 8 in)
- Position: Winger

Team information
- Current team: Viseu 2001
- Number: 10

Youth career
- 1999–2006: Leões Valboenses
- 2006–2007: Jorge Antunes

Senior career*
Years	Team	Apps	(Gls)
2007–2010	Jorge Antunes		
2010–2012	Freixieiro		
2012–2015	Modicus Sandim		
2015–2016	Fundão	36	(20)
2016–2018	Modicus Sandim	55	(19)
2018–2019	Unidos Pinheirense	22	(8)
2019	Viseu 2001	7	(2)

International career^{‡}
2008–2012	Portugal	14	(4)
- * Club domestic league appearances and goals as of 00:00, 21 February 2021 (UTC) ‡ National team caps and goals as of 00:00, 21 February 2021 (UTC)

Tiago André Magalhães Soares (born 9 November 1988) is a Portuguese former futsal player who played as a winger for several teams in the Liga Portuguesa de Futsal including Freixieiro, Modicus Sandim, and Fundão. Soares was capped 14 times for the Portugal national team and won the 2008 Futsal Mundialito with them.
