= Futsal in Portugal =

The Portuguese futsal league is divided into divisions. The top teams play in the 1ª Divisão (1st Division). In each division, a team plays all other teams twice, once at home and once away and 1ª Divisão the final phase is played under the playoff system.

The Portuguese league teams compete in Europe under UEFA, most notably in the UEFA Futsal Cup. The teams also compete in a domestic cup competition each year, called the Portuguese Cup. The winners of the 1ª Divisão play the winners of the Portuguese Cup, in the Portuguese SuperCup.

== Current hierarchical divisional breakdowns ==
- Campeonato Nacional (First Division) (14 teams)
- 2a Divisão (Second Division) (28 teams split in 2 series)
- 3a Divisão (Third Division) (56 teams split in 4 series)
- Distritais (Lower Division) (the rest split by 8 regions)

The Portugal national futsal team represents the whole country in FIFA Futsal World Cup.

Portugal is one of the top futsal nations.

== Other Competitions ==
- Portuguese Cup
- League Cup
- Portuguese SuperCup

== See also ==
- Sport in Portugal
