= Sandro Azenha =

Portuguese futsal player

Personal information
- Full name: Sandro Isidoro Azenha
- Date of birth: 19 May 1988 (age 38)
- Place of birth: Sintra, Portugal
- Height: 1.81 m (5 ft 11 in)
- Position: Goalkeeper

Team information
- Current team: MTBA

Youth career
- 1997–1998: Núcleo Sintra (football)
- 2002–2004: Santa Susana
- 2004–2007: Sporting CP

Senior career*
Years	Team	Apps	(Gls)
2007–2009	Sporting CP	28	(0)
2009–2010	Vitória Olivais		
2010–2011	Sporting Vila Verde		
2011–2013	Cascais		
2013–2017	Quinta dos Lombos		
2017–2018	MTBA		
2018	Belenenses		
2019–	MTBA		

International career^{‡}
2008	Portugal	1	(0)
- * Club domestic league appearances and goals as of 00:00, 13 May 2019 (UTC) ‡ National team caps and goals as of 00:00, 13 May 2019 (UTC)

Sandro Isidoro Azenha (born 19 May 1988) is a Portuguese futsal player who plays as a goalkeeper for MTBA after a short stint at Belenenses in late 2018. Sandro has also been capped once for the Portugal national team.
