= Fábio Cecílio =

Portuguese futsal player

Fábio Cecílio ComIH ComM
Personal information
- Full name: Fábio Miguel Valadares Cecílio
- Date of birth: 30 April 1993 (age 33)
- Place of birth: Barcos, Portugal
- Height: 1.70 m (5 ft 7 in)
- Position: Defender

Team information
- Current team: Eurobus Przemyśl

Youth career
- 2008–2010: AJAB Tabuaço

Senior career*
Years	Team	Apps	(Gls)
2010–2013	AJAB Tabuaço		
2013–2015	Braga/AAUM	53	(39)
2015–2021	Benfica	249	(107)
2021–2025	Braga/AAUM	120	(4)
2025	FF Napoli	8	(4)
2026–	Eurobus Przemyśl	0	(0)

International career^{‡}
2013	Portugal U21	6	(1)
2014–	Portugal	131	(36)
- * Club domestic league appearances and goals as of 17:52, 10 January 2026 (UTC) ‡ National team caps and goals as of 17:52, 10 January 2026 (UTC)

Fábio Miguel Valadares Cecílio ComIH ComM (born 6 April 1993) is a Portuguese futsal player who plays as a defender for Ekstraklasa club Eurobus Przemyśl and the Portugal national team.

== Honours ==
Benfica

- Campeonato Nacional: 2018–19
- Taça da Liga: 2017–18, 2018–19, 2019–20
- Supertaça de Portugal: 2015, 2016

Portugal

- FIFA Futsal World Cup: 2021
- UEFA Futsal Championship: 2018, 2022
- Futsal Finalissima: 2022

=== Orders ===
- Commander of the Order of Prince Henry
- Commander of the Order of Merit
