= Zezito =

Portuguese futsal player

Personal information
- Full name: José António da Costa Pereira Dias
- Date of birth: 4 January 1973 (age 53)
- Place of birth: Lisbon, Portugal
- Height: 1.73 m (5 ft 8 in)
- Position: Pivot

Youth career
- 1988–1990: Alhões
- 1990–1991: Águias Musgueira (football)

Senior career*
Years	Team	Apps	(Gls)
1991–1994	Alhões		
1994–1998	Atlético CP		
1998–1999	Sporting CP		
1999–2000	Ourense		
2000–2009	Sporting CP		
2009–2012	SL Olivais		

International career^{‡}
1998–2005	Portugal	68	(16)
- * Club domestic league appearances and goals as of 00:00, 13 October 2018 (UTC) ‡ National team caps and goals as of 00:00, 13 October 2018 (UTC)

José António da Costa Pereira Dias (born 4 January 1973), commonly known as Zezito, was a Portuguese futsal player who played as a pivot for Alhões, Atlético CP, Sporting CP, and SL Olivais in the Liga Portuguesa de Futsal, and for Ourense in the Spanish Liga Nacional de Fútbol Sala. Zezito was also frequently called to the Portugal national team, earning 68 caps in total.
