= Ricardinho (futsal player, born 1991) =

Portuguese futsal player

Personal information
- Full name: Ricardo Alberto de Jesus Pinto
- Date of birth: 28 November 1991 (age 34)
- Place of birth: Porto, Portugal
- Height: 1.71 m (5 ft 7 in)
- Position: Universal

Team information
- Current team: Modicus Sandim

Youth career
- 2000–2010: Freixieiro

Senior career*
Years	Team	Apps	(Gls)
2010–2011	Freixieiro		
2012	Rio Ave		
2013	Freixieiro		
2013–2017	Modicus Sandim	72	(33)
2017–2018	AD Fundão	28	(10)
2018–	Braga/AAUM	8	(2)

International career^{‡}
2012	Portugal U21	5	(3)
2016	Portugal	8	(0)
- * Club domestic league appearances and goals as of 00:00, 8 August 2018 (UTC) ‡ National team caps and goals as of 15:30, 20 December 2016 (UTC)

Ricardo Alberto de Jesus Pinto (born 28 November 1991), also known as Ricardinho, is a Portuguese futsal player who plays for Braga/AAUM and the Portugal national team.
