= António Teixeira (futsal player) =

Portuguese futsal player

Personal information
- Full name: António Jorge Santos Teixeira
- Date of birth: 2 April 1975 (age 51)
- Place of birth: Lisbon, Portugal
- Position: Pivot

Youth career
- 1992–1993: Recordação de Apolo

Senior career*
Years	Team	Apps	(Gls)
1993–1995	Recordação de Apolo		
1995–1998	Atlético CP		
1998–2000	Sporting CP		
2000–2001	Atlético CP		
2001–2002	Correio da Manhã		
2002–2003	Sporting Vila Verde		
2003–2004	Marinhais		
2004–2005	Estrela da Amadora		
2006–2007	Odivelas FC		

International career^{‡}
1998–2001	Portugal	31	(7)
- * Club domestic league appearances and goals as of 00:00, 20 October 2018 (UTC) ‡ National team caps and goals as of 00:00, 20 October 2018 (UTC)

António Jorge Santos Teixeira (born 2 April 1975) was a Portuguese futsal player who played as a pivot. Teixeira won one Portuguese futsal league with Sporting CP and played for the Portugal national team in the 1999 Euros and the 2000 World Cup.
