= Pedro Cary =

Portuguese futsal player

Personal information
- Full name: Pedro Miguel Fangueiro de São Payo Cary
- Date of birth: 10 May 1984 (age 42)
- Place of birth: Faro, Portugal
- Height: 1.73 m (5 ft 8 in)
- Positions: Winger; defender

Team information
- Current team: Leões Porto Salvo
- Number: 6

Youth career
- 1994–1997: Louletano (football)
- 1998–1999: SL Falcões
- 1999–2003: Benfica de Loulé

Senior career*
Years	Team	Apps	(Gls)
2003–2004	Benfica de Loulé		
2004–2006	JD Fontaínhas		
2006–2007	Melilla FS		
2007–2010	Belenenses		
2010–2019	Sporting CP	289	(130)
2019	Sala 10		
2020–	Leões Porto Salvo		

International career^{‡}
2007–	Portugal	159	(39)
- * Club domestic league appearances and goals as of 00:00, 31 August 2019 (UTC) ‡ National team caps and goals as of 00:00, 20 February 2021 (UTC)

Pedro Miguel Fangueiro de São Payo Cary (born 10 May 1984) is a Portuguese futsal player who plays for Leões Porto Salvo and the Portugal national team.

== Honours ==
- UEFA Futsal Champions League: 2018–19
