= C.D. Aves (futsal) =

Portuguese futsal team

Desportivo das Aves
- Full name: Clube Desportivo das Aves
- Ground: Pavilhão do Clube Desportivo das Aves; Vila das Aves, Portugal
- Capacity: 1000
- Chairman: Armando Silva
- Manager: Fernando Maranho Neves
- League: II Divisão Futsal
- 2018–19: II Divisão Futsal; Series F: 5th Series F relegation playoffs: 3rd

Clube Desportivo das Aves is a futsal team based in Vila das Aves, Portugal, that played in the Portuguese Futsal First Division. It is a part of the C.D. Aves sports club. In 2017 Desportivo das Aves won the North Zone series of the Portuguese II Divisão Futsal achieving the promotion to the first tier Liga Sport Zone.
