= G.D. Fabril (futsal) =

- Full name: Grupo Desportivo Fabril
- Ground: Pavilhão Vítor Domingos; Barreiro, Portugal
- Capacity: 1,500
- Chairman: Faustino Mestre
- Manager: Filipe Azinheirinha
- League: II Divisão Futsal
- 2018–19: II Divisão Futsal; Series F: 5th Series F relegation playoffs: 3rd

Grupo Desportivo Fabril is a futsal team based in the city of Barreiro, Portugal, that played in the Portuguese Futsal First Division. It is a part of the G.D. Fabril sports club. In 2017 Fabril won the South Zone series of the Portuguese II Divisão Futsal achieving the promotion to the first tier Liga Sport Zone for the second time in its history. In 2018 Fabril made it to the Taça de Portugal final eventually losing it to Sporting CP.
