= Mário Freitas =

Portuguese futsal player

Personal information
- Full name: Mário André Afonso Freitas
- Date of birth: 9 February 1990 (age 36)
- Place of birth: Mogadouro, Portugal
- Height: 1.73 m (5 ft 8 in)
- Position: Winger

Team information
- Current team: AD Fundão
- Number: 17

Youth career
- 2000–2001: CA Mogadouro (football)
- 2001–2003: Mogadourense (football)
- 2003–2006: CA Mogadouro
- 2006–2007: Mogadourense (football)
- 2007–2008: Vitória Guimarães (football)
- 2008–2009: CA Mogadouro

Senior career*
Years	Team	Apps	(Gls)
2008–2010	CA Mogadouro		
2010–2012	Sporting CP	13	(1)
2011–2012	→ AD Fundão (loan)		
2012–2015	AD Fundão		
2015–2017	Benfica	29	(3)
2017–	AD Fundão	43	(24)

International career^{‡}
2014–	Portugal	21	(1)
- * Club domestic league appearances and goals as of 00:00, 25 September 2018 (UTC) ‡ National team caps and goals as of 00:00, 25 September 2018 (UTC)

Mário André Afonso Freitas (born 9 February 1990) is a Portuguese professional futsal player who plays for AD Fundão and the Portugal national team as a winger.
