= Coelho (futsal player) =

Portuguese futsal player

Personal information
- Full name: Pedro Manuel Oliveira Martins
- Date of birth: 16 June 1988 (age 38)
- Place of birth: Valbom, Portugal
- Height: 1.83 m (6 ft 0 in)
- Position: Universal

Team information
- Current team: Braga/AAUM
- Number: 6

Youth career
- 1999–2006: Leões Valboenses
- 2006–2007: Jorge Antunes

Senior career*
Years	Team	Apps	(Gls)
2007–2010	Jorge Antunes		
2010–2012	Freixieiro		
2012–2014	Rio Ave		
2014–2018	Modicus Sandim	85	(55)
2018–	Braga/AAUM	9	(1)

International career^{‡}
2012–	Portugal	4	(0)
- * Club domestic league appearances and goals ‡ National team caps and goals as of 00:00, 6 October 2018 (UTC)

Pedro Manuel Oliveira Martins (born 16 June 1988), commonly known as Coelho, is a Portuguese futsal player who is a universal player for Braga/AAUM and the Portugal national team.
