= Tiago Cruz =

Portuguese futsal player

Personal information
- Full name: Tiago Daniel Galante Cruz
- Date of birth: 5 July 1995 (age 31)
- Place of birth: Caxinas, Portugal
- Height: 1.75 m (5 ft 9 in)
- Position: Winger

Team information
- Current team: Braga/AAUM

Youth career
- 2004–2013: Caxinas

Senior career*
Years	Team	Apps	(Gls)
2013–2015	Rio Ave		
2015–2017	Braga/AAUM		
2017–2019	Rio Ave		
2019–	Braga/AAUM		

International career^{‡}
2013–2016	Portugal U21	14	(7)
2018–	Portugal	2	(0)
- * Club domestic league appearances and goals as of 00:00, 10 May 2019 (UTC) ‡ National team caps and goals as of 00:00, 10 May 2019 (UTC)

Tiago Daniel Galante Cruz (born 5 July 1995) is a Portuguese futsal player who plays as a winger for Braga/AAUM and the Portugal national team.
