= Formiga (futsal player) =

Portuguese futsal player

Personal information
- Full name: Rogério Hugo Rodrigues dos Santos
- Date of birth: 22 October 1978 (age 48)
- Place of birth: Porto, Portugal
- Height: 1.71 m (5 ft 7 in)
- Position: Winger

Team information
- Current team: Gondomar FC
- Number: 11

Youth career
- 1989–1990: Senhora da Hora (football)

Senior career*
Years	Team	Apps	(Gls)
1997–1998	Gaia		
1998–1999	Lusíada Porto		
1999–2007	Freixieiro		
2007–2009	Burela		
2009–2010	Alpendorada		
2010–2011	Belenenses		
2011–2012	Modicus Sandim		
2012–2013	Lamas Futsal		
2013–2014	Rio Ave		
2014–2015	Boavista		
2015–2018	Unidos Pinheirense		
2018–	Gondomar FC		

International career^{‡}
2000	Portugal U21	2	(1)
2001	Portugal U23	2	(1)
2000–2009	Portugal	85	(27)
- * Club domestic league appearances and goals as of 00:00, 14 October 2018 (UTC) ‡ National team caps and goals as of 00:00, 14 October 2018 (UTC)

Rogério Hugo Rodrigues dos Santos (born 22 October 1978), commonly known as Formiga, is a Portuguese futsal player who plays as a winger for Gondomar FC. Formiga also played for the Portugal national team, earning 85 caps in total.
