= Gonçalo Portugal =

Portuguese futsal player

Personal information
- Full name: Gonçalo de Sousa Portugal
- Date of birth: 21 January 1992 (age 34)
- Place of birth: Lisbon, Portugal
- Height: 1.73 m (5 ft 8 in)
- Position: Goalkeeper

Team information
- Current team: Sporting CP
- Number: 1

Youth career
- 2002–2007: Shotokai Queluz
- 2007–2011: Sporting CP

Senior career*
Years	Team	Apps	(Gls)
2010–	Sporting CP	68	(1)
2014–2015	→ AD Fundão (loan)	8	(0)
2016	→ Quinta dos Lombos (loan)	5	(0)

International career^{‡}
2012–2013	Portugal U21	7	(0)
2019–	Portugal	2	(0)
- * Club domestic league appearances and goals as of 00:00, 11 August 2018 (UTC) ‡ National team caps and goals as of 00:00, 5 July 2019 (UTC)

Gonçalo de Sousa Portugal (born 21 January 1992) is a Portuguese futsal player who plays for Sporting CP and the Portugal national team.
