= Ré (futsal player) =

Portuguese futsal player

Personal information
- Full name: Nélson Ricardo Gomes Alves Santos
- Date of birth: 4 October 1985 (age 41)
- Place of birth: Lisbon, Portugal
- Height: 1.66 m (5 ft 5 in)
- Position: Winger

Team information
- Current team: Leões Porto Salvo
- Number: 14

Youth career
- 2000–2001: Buraca
- 2003–2004: UPVN

Senior career*
Years	Team	Apps	(Gls)
2005–2006	Priorenses		
2006–2007	Odivelas FC		
2007–2009	Sassoeiros		
2009–2010	Sporting CP	25	(2)
2010–2012	Leões Porto Salvo		
2012	Al Rayyan		
2012–2014	Leões Porto Salvo		
2014–2017	Benfica		
2017–	Leões Porto Salvo		

International career^{‡}
2013–2016	Portugal	29	(5)
- * Club domestic league appearances and goals as of 00:00, 18 May 2019 (UTC) ‡ National team caps and goals as of 00:00, 18 May 2019 (UTC)

Nélson Ricardo Gomes Alves Santos (born 4 October 1985), known as Ré, is a Portuguese futsal player who plays as a winger for Leões Porto Salvo Ré was capped 29 times for the Portugal national team and competed in the 2016 FIFA Futsal World Cup.

== Personal life ==
Born in Portugal, Ré is of Cape Verdean descent.
