= Vitinha (futsal player) =

Portuguese futsal player

Personal information
- Full name: Vítor Manuel da Silva Marques
- Date of birth: 16 March 1969 (age 57)
- Place of birth: Castro Daire, Portugal
- Height: 1.77 m (5 ft 10 in)
- Position: Defender

Youth career
- 1983–1985: Oriental (football)
- 1985–1986: CF Chelas (football)
- 1986–1987: Oriental Recreativo (football)

Senior career*
Years	Team	Apps	(Gls)
1987–1988	Alhões		
1988–1990	Palmense (football)		
1990–1991	Oriental Recreativo		
1991–1992	Palmense (football)		
1992–1993	Alhões		
1993–1997	Atlético CP		
1997–2001	Sporting CP		
2001–2003	Benfica		
2003–2006	SL Olivais		
2006–2007	Odivelas FC		
2007–2009	Lagoa e Benfica		
2009	Portela		
2010	Caldas		
2012–2013	Oriental Recreativo		

International career^{‡}
1995–2002	Portugal	51	(10)
- * Club domestic league appearances and goals as of 00:00, 17 October 2018 (UTC) ‡ National team caps and goals as of 00:00, 17 October 2018 (UTC)

Vítor Manuel da Silva Marques (born 16 March 1969), commonly known as Vitinha, is a Portuguese former futsal player who played as a defender. Vitinha captained the Portugal national team, and was the most capped player alongside André Lima upon his retirement from the team.
