= Nelito =

Portuguese futsal player

Personal information
- Full name: Vítor Manuel Simões Fernandes Bernardo
- Date of birth: 31 March 1970 (age 56)
- Place of birth: Lisbon, Portugal
- Height: 1.65 m (5 ft 5 in)
- Position: Pivot

Senior career*
Years	Team	Apps	(Gls)
1994–2000	Correio da Manhã		(130)
2000–2001	Sporting Vila Verde		(43)
2001–2003	Benfica		(23)
2003–2004	Correio da Manhã		(25)
2004–2006	Benfica		(35)

International career^{‡}
1998–2002	Portugal	38	(26)

Managerial career
- 2006–2013: Benfica (assistant coach)
- 2018–: Novos Talentos
- * Club domestic league appearances and goals as of 00:00, 20 October 2018 (UTC) ‡ National team caps and goals as of 00:00, 20 October 2018 (UTC)

Vítor Leonel Simões Fernandes Bernardo (born 31 Março 1970), commonly known as Nelito, is a Portuguese futsal coach and former futsal player who played as a pivot. He is the head coach of the Lisbon Division of Honour club Novos Talentos. As a player Nelito was the 2000–01 Portuguese Futsal First Division top scorer while playing for Sporting Vila Verde and he won two Portuguese futsal leagues with Benfica. Nelito played for the Portugal national team in the 1999 Euros and the 2000 World Cup.
