= Santos da Venda Nova =

Portuguese futsal club

- Full name: Santos Futebol Clube da Venda Nova
- Founded: 12 April 1982; 43 years ago
- 2017–18: Liga Futsal Inatel Lisboa, 2nd

Santos Futebol Clube da Venda Nova is a Portuguese sports club based in Venda Nova, Amadora. Founded in 1982 the club is better known for its futsal team whose greatest success was winning the second edition of the Portuguese Futsal League. After last playing in the top tier during the 2001–02 season following two promotions in two seasons, the futsal team currently plays in the local Liga Futsal Inatel Lisboa amateur league.
