= Márcio Moreira (futsal player) =

Portuguese futsal player

Personal information
- Full name: Joaquim Márcio Gonçalves Moreira
- Date of birth: 24 June 1990 (age 36)
- Place of birth: Matosinhos, Portugal
- Height: 1.76 m (5 ft 9 in)
- Position: Winger

Team information
- Current team: AD Fundão
- Number: 8

Youth career
- 2000–2009: Freixieiro

Senior career*
Years	Team	Apps	(Gls)
2009–2010	Freixieiro		
2010–2011	Farlab		
2011–2012	Póvoa Futsal		
2012	Rio Ave		
2013	Freixieiro		
2013–2014	Modicus Sandim		
2014–2015	Póvoa Futsal	25	(22)
2015–	AD Fundão	87	(42)

International career^{‡}
2016–	Portugal	16	(3)
- * Club domestic league appearances and goals ‡ National team caps and goals as of 00:00, 25 September 2018 (UTC)

Joaquim Márcio Gonçalves Moreira (born 24 June 1990) is a Portuguese professional futsal player who plays for AD Fundão and the Portugal national team as a winger.
