= Orlando Duarte =

Brazilian sports journalist (1932–2020)

- Born: Orlando Duarte Figueiredo; 18 February 1932; Rancharia, São Paulo, Brazil
- Died: 15 December 2020 (aged 88); São Paulo, São Paulo, Brazil
- Occupation(s): Sports journalist and commentator

Orlando Duarte Figueiredo (18 February 1932 – 15 December 2020) was a Brazilian sports journalist and commentator.

== Career ==
He was one of the most complete sports chroniclers in Brazil. Acting for a long time on radio and television in São Paulo and writing a column distributed throughout the country, he covered 14 world football championships, ten Olympic Games and championships of various sports. Duarte covered all the World Cups during the period between 1950 and 2006. During the 1960s, he was a journalist continually covering Santos' masterful team closely, and ended up becoming a personal friend of Pelé. Duarte would write the player's official biography years later. His broadcasting career was interrupted in 2007 due to his health. In February 2019, his wife revealed that the commentator suffered from Alzheimer's disease, which showed signs after the 2018 World Cup.

== Death ==
Duarte died on 15 December 2020, a victim of COVID-19 during the COVID-19 pandemic in Brazil, after three weeks of hospitalization to treat two aneurysms and coronavirus symptoms.
