= Luis Pedro Molina =

Guatemalan footballer

Personal information
- Full name: Luis Pedro Molina Bruni
- Date of birth: June 4, 1977 (age 49)
- Place of birth: Retalhuleu, Guatemala
- Height: 1.88 m (6 ft 2 in)
- Position: Goalkeeper

Team information
- Current team: Deportivo Marquense
- Number: 1

Senior career*
| Years | Team | Apps | (Gls) |
| 2000–2004 | Comunicaciones | 6 | (0) |
| 2004–2009 | Deportivo Jalapa | 72 | (0) |
| 2009–? | Marquense | | (0) |
| 2012– | Petapa | 59 | (0) |

International career^{‡}
| 2000– | Guatemala | 15 | (0) |
| 2000 | Guatemala (futsal) | | |
- * Club domestic league appearances and goals as of 20 February 2007 ‡ National team caps and goals as of 22 February 2010

Luis Pedro Molina Bruni (born 4 June 1977) is a Guatemalan football goalkeeper. He currently plays for the local club Deportivo Marquense in the Guatemala's top division.

== Club career ==
Molina had been the reserve goalkeeper at Guatemala's top side Comunicaciones behind Edgar Estrada and Danny Ortiz, but moved to Jalapa in 2004 in order to get more playing time. He moved to Marquense in 2009 after Jalapa failed to pay him and in November 2009 Jalapa were ordered to settle the debt or would lose three points.

== International career ==
He made his debut for the Guatemalan national team in a January 2000 friendly match against Panama and sometimes represented them during the 2006 World Cup qualification campaign. He had earned 15 caps at the start of January 2010.

Also a futsal player, he was part of his country's Futsal team, and played at the 2000 Futsal World Championship which was held in Guatemala.
