= AD Jorge Antunes =

Portuguese sports club

Jorge Antunes
- Full name: Associação - Desportivo Jorge Antunes
- Founded: 27 December 1979; 46 years ago as Grupo Desportivo da Lasa
- Ground: Pavilhão Municipal de Vizela, Vizela, Portugal
- Capacity: 450
- Chairman: (Portugal) Bento José Pinto Antunes
- Manager: (Portugal) Paulo Leite
- League: Portuguese Futsal First Division
Home colours

Associação - Desportivo Jorge Antunes is a sports club based in Vizela, Portugal. The club was originally founded as Grupo Desportivo da Lasa but in 1989 it became involved with the Fundação Jorge Antunes (Jorge Antunes Foundation) and changed its name to Grupo Desportivo Fundação Jorge Antunes, before again changing it to its current name in 2011. The club is best known for its futsal team which has previously played in the Portuguese Futsal First Division.

== Honours ==
National

- Portugal Cup:
  - Winner (2): 2000–01, 2001–02
  - Runner-up (1): 2007–08
- Supercup:
  - Runner-up (2): 2001, 2002

== Former players ==
- (Portugal) (Brazil) Fábio Aguiar (2005–08 and 2009)
- (Portugal) Miguel Almeida (2009–10)
- (Portugal) Fernando Cardinal (2004–05)
- (Portugal) Coelho (2006–10)
- (Brazil) Divanei (2004–08)
- (Portugal) Pedro Ferreira (2001–04)
- (Portugal) Amílcar Gomes (2009–11)
- (Portugal) João Leite (2001–03, 2006–07 and 2008–09)
- (Portugal) Paulo Leite (2000–07 and 2009–11)
- (Portugal) Luís Miguel (2002–03)
- (Portugal) Majó (2001–02)
- (Portugal) Marinho (2005–09 and 2020–21)
- (Portugal) (Brazil) Gil Marques (2001–03)
- (Portugal) Toni Martins (2002–05 and 2008–11)
- (Portugal) Paulo Jorge (2001–02)
- (Portugal) Gabriel Pereira (2000–01 and 2004–10)
- (Portugal) Hugo Ramada (2009–11)
- (Portugal) Sílvio Roda (2006–07)
- (Portugal) (Brazil) Sérgio Júnior (2002–05)
- (Portugal) Fábio Soares (2004–11)
- (Portugal) Tiago Soares (2006–10)
- (Portugal) Vítor Hugo (2004–10)
