= João Benedito =

Portuguese futsal player

Personal information
- Full name: João Paulo Feliciano Neves Benedito
- Date of birth: 7 October 1978 (age 48)
- Place of birth: Lisbon, Portugal
- Height: 1.76 m (5 ft 9 in)
- Position: Goalkeeper

Youth career
- 1992–1994: UDOB
- 1994–1996: Sporting CP

Senior career*
Years	Team	Apps	(Gls)
1995–2006	Sporting CP	253	(0)
2006–2007	Playas de Castellón		
2007–2016	Sporting CP	208	(1)

International career^{‡}
2000	Portugal U21	2	(0)
2001	Portugal U23	2	(0)
2000–2014	Portugal	181	(0)
- * Club domestic league appearances and goals as of 22:40, 5 May 2016 (UTC) ‡ National team caps and goals as of 19 August 2016 (UTC)

João Paulo Feliciano Neves Benedito (born 7 October 1978) is a retired Portuguese futsal player. He played as a goalkeeper for Sporting CP, Playas de Castellón and the Portugal national team.
