= Boavista F.C. (futsal) =

Boavista
- Full name: Boavista Futebol Clube
- Ground: Pavilhão Rosa Mota; Porto; Portugal
- Capacity: 4,500
- League: Portuguese Futsal First Division
Home colours	Away colours

Boavista Futebol Clube is an amateur futsal team based in Porto, Portugal. It plays in Portuguese Futsal First Division.

== Honours ==
International

- European Futsal Cup Winners Cup:
  - Runner-up (1): 2005–06

National

- Taça de Portugal de Futsal:
  - Runner-up (1): 2004–05
- SuperTaça de Futsal de Portugal:
  - Winner (1): 2005
