= CCRD Burinhosa =

Burinhosa
- Full name: Centro Cultural Recreativo e Desportivo Burinhosa
- Ground: Pavilhão Gimnodesportivo da Burinhosa; Burinhosa, Portugal
- Capacity: 300
- Chairman: Tiago Inácio
- Manager: Alexandre Pinto
- League: Liga Sport Zone
- 2015–16: Overall table: 3rd Playoffs: Semi-Finals

Centro Cultural Recreativo e Desportivo Burinhosa is a futsal team based in the village of Burinhosa, Portugal. It plays in the Portuguese Futsal First Division.

== Current squad ==
As of 15 May 2019

#	Position	Name	Nationality
1	Goalkeeper	John Welton	(Brazil)
4	Goalkeeper	João Azevedo	(Portugal)
5	Winger	Marquinhos	(Brazil)
7	Winger	Pimpolho	(Portugal)
8	Pivot	Kiko Nunes	(Portugal)
8	Winger	Dino	(Portugal)
10	Winger	Russo	(Portugal)
9	Winger	Paulo Ferreira	(Portugal)
11	Winger	Gui Fonseca	(Brazil)
12	Goalkeeper	Airton Martins	(Portugal)
13	Pivot	Tiago Pereira	(Portugal)
14	Pivot	Tunha	(Portugal)
15	Defender	Nuno Chuva	(Portugal)
17	Winger	Matheus Abreu	(Brazil)
20	Pivot	Jovan Lazarević	(Serbia)
20	Defender	Leonardo Lopes	(Portugal)
20	Winger	Miguel Pegacha	(Portugal)
21	Winger	João Marçal	(Portugal)
22	Pivot	Nino	(Brazil)
25	Defender	Careca	(Portugal)
25	Goalkeeper	José Presado	(Portugal)
77	Defender	Espanhol	(Portugal)
