= Instituto D. João V =

- Full name: Clube Desportivo Instituto D. João V
- Founded: 1992
- Dissolved: 2011
- Ground: Pavilhão do Instituto D. João V Pombal; Portugal
- Capacity: 1,500
- Chairman: Ventura Pereira
- League: Liga Portuguesa de Futsal
- 2010–11: Overall table: 4th Playoffs: Semi-finals
- Website: https://idjv.pt/
Home colours	Away colours

Clube Desportivo Instituto D. João V is a former futsal team from Pombal, Portugal created by the Instituto D. João V school. They played in the Liga Portuguesa de Futsal but dissolved in 2011 due to lack of sponsors.

== Honours ==
National

- Taça de Portugal de Futsal:
  - Winner (1): 1998–99
  - Runner-up (1): 2000–01
- SuperTaça de Futsal de Portugal:
  - Winner (1): 1999

== Former players ==
- (Portugal) (Brazil) Fábio Aguiar (2009–11)
- (Portugal) Nuno Dias (1997–2003)
- (Portugal) Dani Fernandes (1997–98)
- (Portugal) Pedro Ferreira (1999–2001)
- (Portugal) Nuno Neves (2000–01)
- (Portugal) Arnaldo Pereira (1999–2001)
- (Portugal) Ruizinho (2000–02 and 2007–11)
- (Portugal) André Sousa (2007–11)
