= GDC Correio da Manhã =

Portuguese futsal club

Correio da Manhã
- Full name: Grupo Desportivo e Cultural do Correio da Manhã
- Founded: 1981
- Dissolved: 2004
- Final season; 2003–04: Liga Portuguesa de Futsal, 10th of 16

Grupo Desportivo e Cultural do Correio da Manhã was a Portuguese sports club based in Lisbon. Founded in 1981 by employees of the newspaper Correio da Manhã, the club was better known for its futsal team whose greater successes included two Portuguese Futsal League wins and one Portuguese Futsal Cup. The futsal team ceased playing after the 2003–04 season ceding its spot in the league to Estrela da Amadora.

== Former players ==
- (Portugal) Manuel Azevedo (1994–97 and 1998–2000)
- (Portugal) Bibi (2000–01)
- (Portugal) Paulo Castelinho (1994–2000 and 2002–04)
- (Portugal) Cautela (1997–98)
- (Portugal) Nuno Coelho (2000–02)
- (Portugal) Ivo Cristóvão (1994–2000)
- (Portugal) Majó (2002–04)
- (Portugal) Naná (1997–98 and 1999–2001)
- (Portugal) Nelito (1994–2000 and 2003–04)
- (Portugal) Nuno Neves (2001–02)
- (Portugal) Nhonha (2000–04)
- (Portugal) Lino Oliveira
- (Portugal) Pedro Miguel (1995–96)
- (Portugal) Nuno Rodrigues (1998–2000)
- (Portugal) António Teixeira (2001–02)
- (Portugal) Vitinha (1994–97 and 2000–01)
- (Portugal) Xana (1994–2000)
- (Portugal) Rodrigo Nunes (2000-2004)
