= Leões de Porto Salvo =

- Full name: Clube Recreativo Leões de Porto Salvo
- Ground: Pavilhão dos Leões de Porto Salvo; Porto Salvo, Portugal
- Capacity: 660
- Chairman: Jorge Delgado
- Manager: Ricardo Lobão
- League: Liga Placard
- 2022–23: Overall table: 4th Playoffs: Semifinals
- Website: http://www.leoesdeportosalvo.pt/

Clube Recreativo Leões de Porto Salvo is a sports club based in the village of Porto Salvo, Portugal. The futsal team of Leões de Porto Salvo plays in the Portuguese Futsal First Division.

== Futsal ==
=== Current squad ===
As of 22 May 2023

| # | Position | Name | Nationality |
|---|---|---|---|
| 1 | Goalkeeper | André Correia | (Portugal) |
| 24 | Goalkeeper | Pedro Martinho | (Portugal) |
| 6 | Defender | Pedro Cary | (Portugal) |
| 8 | Defender | Wesley Reinaldo | (Brazil) |
| 92 | Defender | Djaelson | (Brazil) |
| 10 | Winger | Ruan Silvestre | (Brazil) |
| 12 | Winger | Bruno Pinto | (Portugal) |
| 13 | Winger | Rodrigo Hiroshi | (Brazil) |
| 14 | Winger | Ré | (Portugal) |
| 18 | Winger | Francisco Oliveira | (Portugal) |
| 41 | Winger | Wendell | (Brazil) |
| 7 | Pivot | Mamadú Ture | (Guinea-Bissau) |
