= Supertaça de Futsal =

- Founded: 1998
- Region: Portugal
- Teams: 2
- Current champions: Sporting (13th title)
- Most championships: Sporting (13 titles)
- Broadcaster: TVI24
- Website: Website

Supertaça de Portugal de Futsal (English: Portuguese Futsal Super Cup) is a futsal cup in Portugal, played by the winners of the Portuguese Futsal First Division and the winners of the Portuguese Futsal Cup.

GDC Correio da Manhã were the first winners, in 1998, and the latest winners are Sporting, having won the trophy for the 13th time.

== Winners ==
| Year | Final |
| Year | Winners | Result | Runners-up |
|---|---|---|---|
| 1998 | Correio da Manhã | 7–6 | Miramar |
| 1999 | Instituto D.João V | 5–4 / 6–2 | Sporting |
| 2000 | Miramar | 6–4 / 1–0 | Correio da Manhã |
| 2001 | Sporting | 4–3 / 2–1 | Jorge Antunes |
| 2002 | AR Freixieiro | 3–4 / 6–4 | Jorge Antunes |
| 2003 | Benfica | 3–0 | AR Freixieiro |
| 2004 | Sporting (2) | 7–1 | Olivais |
| 2005 | Boavista | 4–2 | Benfica |
| 2006 | Benfica (2) | 5–5 (5–4 p.) | Sporting |
| 2007 | Benfica (3) | 8–3 | Braga/AAUM |
| 2008 | Sporting (3) | 5–3 | Benfica |
| 2009 | Benfica (4) | 1–0 | Belenenses |
| 2010 | Sporting (4) | 5–2 | Belenenses |
| 2011 | Benfica (5) | 3–2 | Sporting |
| 2012 | Benfica (6) | 5–3 | Modicus |
| 2013 | Sporting (5) | 4–1 | Braga/AAUM |
| 2014 | Sporting (6) | 7–0 | AD Fundão |
| 2015 | Benfica (7) | 6–3 | AD Fundão |
| 2016 | Benfica (8) | 3–2 | Sporting |
| 2017 | Sporting (7) | 3–2 | Benfica |
| 2018 | Sporting (8) | 11–0 | Fabril |
| 2019 | Sporting (9) | 6–2 | Benfica |
| 2020 | Cancelled due to the COVID-19 pandemic in Europe |
| 2021 | Sporting (10) | 7–2 | Benfica |
| 2022 | Sporting (11) | 4–4 (3–1 p.) | Benfica |
| 2023 | Benfica (9) | 4–4 (5–4 aet) | Sporting |
| 2024 | Braga/AAUM (1) | 3-3(5–3 aet) | Sporting |
| 2025 | Sporting (12) | 6-1 | Benfica |
| 2026 | Sporting (13) | 3-2 (aet) | Benfica |

=== Performance by club ===
| Team | Winners | Runners-up | Years won | Years runners-up |
|---|---|---|---|---|
| Sporting | 13 | 6 | 2001, 2004, 2008, 2010, 2013, 2014, 2017, 2018, 2019, 2021, 2022, 2025, 2026 | 1999, 2006, 2011, 2016, 2023, 2024 |
| Benfica | 9 | 8 | 2003, 2006, 2007, 2009, 2011, 2012, 2015, 2016, 2023 | 2005, 2008, 2017, 2019, 2021, 2022, 2025, 2026 |
| Correio da Manhã | 1 | 1 | 1998 | 2000 |
| Miramar | 1 | 1 | 2000 | 1998 |
| AR Freixieiro | 1 | 1 | 2002 | 2003 |
| Instituto D. João V | 1 | 0 | 1999 | – |
| Boavista | 1 | 0 | 2005 | – |
| AD Jorge Antunes | 0 | 2 | – | 2001, 2002 |
| Belenenses | 0 | 2 | – | 2009, 2010 |
| Braga/AAUM | 1 | 2 | 2024 | 2007, 2013 |
| AD Fundão | 0 | 2 | – | 2014, 2015 |
| Olivais | 0 | 1 | – | 2004 |
| Modicus | 0 | 1 | – | 2012 |
| Fabril | 0 | 1 | – | 2018 |
