= SC Vila Verde =

- Full name: Sporting Clube Vila Verde
- Founded: 1943
- Ground: Pavilhão do SC Vila Verde, Sintra, Portugal
- Capacity: 2,500
- Chairman: (Portugal) António Tojeira Mateus
- Manager: (Portugal) Rodrigo Barreiros
- League: Portuguese Futsal First Division

Sporting Clube Vila Verde is a futsal team based in Sintra, Portugal. It plays in Portuguese Futsal First Division. They were founded in 1943.

== History ==
The foundation of Sporting Clube Vila Verde happened in the first half of the 20th century, more precisely in 1943, on January 15, responsibility of an organizing committee composed of natural earth.

Almost exactly four years later, on January 20, 1947, on the same date they are published in serial No. 20 in the Government Gazette, are presented in the General Assembly of the statutes that would govern the Club.

However, only in 1953 the club began to participate in official events of the Football Association Lisbon. The even later began the construction of the headquarters building in 1964, the year the Club also bought the land where sports facilities by 7000 $ 00 and publish in the Government Gazette No. 287 series III, the list of management bodies.

In the early 1970s the club began the participation of youth in football 11 that survived the extinction of seniors in 1984 for lack of funds. In 1980 started up the works of the sports pavilion that would, years later, the inscription of the Club to participate in Division III District Football 5. It took just one year to the team climb to second division and then two more for the climb to Division I in the same year that the flag of the club received the final district level, followed from the year 1992. It was also this year that the Club is affiliated to Sporting Clube de Portugal.

In 1994, the Club has finally managed to climb to the Division I National Futsal where he participated in the seasons 1994/95 to 1997/98. At the end of this season came down to the Second Division. Still, in 1999, the Club could be a finalist of the Cup of Portugal Futsal being defeated by the team of D. João V has an extension.

== Current Squad 2009/2010 ==
Note: Flags indicate national team as defined under FIFA eligibility rules; some limited exceptions apply. Players may hold more than one non-FIFA nationality.

No.	Pos.	Nation	Player
—		POR	Carlo
—		POR	Libaneo
—		POR	Andre Rocha
—		POR	Dino
—		POR	Tchola
—		POR	Magina
—		AUS	Miles
—		POR	Ivan Varela
—		POR	Huguinho

No.	Pos.	Nation	Player
—		POR	Fabio
—		POR	Fabio Capelas
—		POR	Vasco
—		POR	Daniel Ramos
—		POR	Diogo Alves
—		POR	Bruno Cardoso
—		POR	Tuca
—		POR	Teixeira
