= Sporting Clube de Braga/AAUM =

- Full name: Sporting Clube de Braga - Associação Académica da Universidade do Minho
- Nicknames: Os Arcebispos (The Archbishops); Os Arsenalistas (The Arsenalists); Os Guerreiros do Minho (The Minho Warriors)
- Short name: SC Braga/AAUM
- Founded: 7 August 2007; 18 years ago
- Ground: Pavilhão Desportivo da Universidade do Minho, Braga
- President: António Salvador
- Head Coach: Paulo Tavaes
- League: Liga Portuguesa de Futsal
- 2021-22: Overall table: 6th Playoffs: Quarterfinals
- Website: http://www.scbaaumfutsal.com
Home colours	Away colours

Sporting Clube de Braga/AAUM Futsal is a futsal team based in Braga, Portugal. The team was established in 2007 when SC Braga and AAUM (University of Minho Students Association) merged their futsal teams. The senior team plays in Liga Portuguesa de Futsal.

== Honours ==
National

- Portuguese League:
  - Runner-up: 2016-17, 2023-24
  - Semi-finals (3): 2013–14, 2014–15, 2015–16
- Portugal Cup:
  - 2023-2024
- Supercup:
  - 2024
  - Runner-up (2): 2007, 2013
- Portuguese League Cup:
  - Runner-up: 2019

== Technical Team ==
Technical Team
	Name	Post
(Portugal)	Paulo Tavares	Head coach
(Portugal)	David Lopes	Assistant coach
(Portugal)	Luís Silva	Goal-keeper's coach
(Portugal)	Pedro Rodrigues	Physiotherapist

== Current squad ==
As of 9 March 2023

#	Position	Name	Nationality
1	Goalkeeper	Pedro Nunes	(Portugal)
21	Goalkeeper	Leandro Costa	(Portugal)
31	Goalkeeper	Deivd Charles	(Brazil)
3	Defender	Tiago Sousa	(Portugal)
5	Defender	Fábio Cecílio	(Portugal)
9	Defender	Ricardo Lopes	(Portugal)
19	Defender	Rodrigo Rego	(Portugal)
6	Winger	Tiago Brito	(Portugal)
8	Winger	Rudi Júnior	(Brazil)
10	Winger	Robinho	(Russia)
12	Winger	Tiago Correia	(Portugal)
30	Winger	Rúben Santos	(Portugal)
33	Winger	Samuel Marques	(Portugal)
71	Winger	Bruno Soares	(Portugal)
11	Pivot	Allan Guilherme	(Brazil)
14	Pivot	Júnior	(Portugal)
99	Pivot	Jean Gaúcho	(Brazil)

== Historical results ==
Season	I	II	RS	Pts	G	W	D	L	GF	GA	+/-	Cup	SC	L Cup
2018–19	quarterfinal		6th	38 pts	26	11	5	10	71	72	-1	1/8 final	-	Final
2017–18	semifinal		3rd	50 pts	26	15	5	6	86	59	+27	1/4 final	-	1/2 final
2016–17	Final		3rd	54 pts	26	16	6	4	101	62	+39	1/8 final	-	1/4 final
2015–16	semifinal		4th	48 pts	26	14	6	6	91	50	+41	5th stage	-	1/4 final
2014–15	semifinal		2nd	65 pts	26	21	2	3	120	67	+53	1/16 final	-	
2013–14	semifinal		3rd	61 pts	26	20	1	5	126	76	+50	1/4 final	Final	
2012–13	quarterfinal		5th	41 pts	26	13	2	11	87	83	+4	Final	-	
2011–12	9th		10th	26 pts	26	7	5	14	80	105	-25	2nd stage	-	
2010–11		2nd	1st	60 pts	26	19	3	4	101	60	+41	3rd stage	-	
2009–10		4th	4th	42 pts	26	12	6	8	100	93	+7	2nd stage	-	
2008–09		4th	4th	53 pts	26	15	2	9	129	103	+26	1st stage	-	
2007–08		3rd	3rd	51 pts	26	16	3	7	131	99	+32	1st stage	Final	
2006–07	11th		12th	20 pts	26	5	5	16	54	114	-60	Final	-	
2005–06	11th		11th	22 pts	26	6	4	16	78	119	-41	3rd stage	-	
I – 1st Division; II – 2nd Division; the following statistics only refer to regular seasons: Pts – Points; G – Games; W – Wins; D – Draws; L – Losses; GF – Goals for; GA – Goals against; +/- – Goal difference; Cup – Portuguese Cup; SC – Supercup

Promoted to division above
Relegated to division below

=== UEFA Club Competitions record ===
Season	Competition	Round	Opponent	Result	Venue	Qual
2017–18	UEFA Futsal Cup	Main Round	(Spain) Inter FS	1—4	Maribor	3rd (A)
2017–18	UEFA Futsal Cup	Main Round	(Russia) MFK Dina Moskva	1—2	Maribor	3rd (A)
2017–18	UEFA Futsal Cup	Main Round	(Slovenia) Brezje Maribor	3—2	Maribor	3rd (A)
2017–18	UEFA Futsal Cup	Elite Round	(Spain) Inter FS	0—7	Madrid	3rd (E)
2017–18	UEFA Futsal Cup	Elite Round	(Kazakhstan) Kairat Almaty	1—4	Madrid	3rd (E)
2017–18	UEFA Futsal Cup	Elite Round	(Romania) Autobergamo Deva	8—5	Madrid	3rd (E)
