= C.F. Os Belenenses (futsal) =

Futsal team based in Lisbon, Portugal

Belenenses
- Full name: Clube Futebol Os Belenenses
- Nickname: Os Azuis do Restelo (The Blues from Restelo)
- Founded: 2003
- Ground: Pavilhão Acácio Rosa; Lisbon, Portugal
- Capacity: 1,683
- Chairman: Patrick Morais de Carvalho
- Manager: José Feijão
- League: Liga Placard
Home colours	Away colours

Clube Futebol Os Belenenses is an amateur futsal team based in Lisbon, Portugal. It plays in Liga Placard .

Their nickname comes from the fact that in their first two seasons they won two trophies (Campeonato Nacional da 3ª Divisão and Campeonato Nacional da 2ª Divisão). In 2009-10 they win their most important title, the Taça de Portugal de Futsal for the first time, beating Benfica in the final. Benfica scored first, but Diego Sol equalized in the second half, Marcelinho in the final seconds of Extra time scored the decisive goal. Notable players included Marcão, Diego Sol, Pedro Cary, Paulinho and Marcelinho.

More recently, Belenenses encountered some financial problems, including a request for insolvency after unpaid salaries to former futsal player Formiga and a pledge of the clubs trophies for unpaid construction work done to Estádio do Restelo. Belenenses was relegated in 2011/2012 after a play-out.

== Current squad ==
As of 15 May 2019

#	Position	Name	Nationality
1	Goalkeeper	Marcão	(Brazil)
3	Winger	Jota Ramos	(Portugal)
4	Universal	Tiago Correia	(Portugal)
7	Winger	João Marques	(Portugal)
8	Winger	João Pires	(Portugal)
9	Winger	Yulián Díaz	(Colombia)
10	Winger	Mamadu Turé	(Guinea-Bissau)
11	Winger	Bruno Pinto	(Portugal)
12	Goalkeeper	Paulo Pimenta	(Portugal)
15	Winger	Cláudio Ferreira	(Portugal)
16	Goalkeeper	André Carrola	(Portugal)
16	Goalkeeper	Sandro Azenha	(Portugal)
19	Defender	Sandro Noronha	(Portugal)
19	Universal	Wilson Tavares	(Portugal)
23	Pivot	Jardel	(Portugal)
23	Universal	Daniel Pinto	(Portugal)
38	Goalkeeper	Márcio Santos	(Portugal)
38	Goalkeeper	Pedro Mónica	(Portugal)
48	Pivot	José Varela	(Portugal)
94	Winger	Rodrigo Lolatto	(Brazil)
96	Winger	Ygor Mota	(Brazil)

== Honours ==
National

- Liga Portuguesa de Futsal:
  - Runner-up (2): 2007–08, 2008–09
- Taça de Portugal de Futsal:
  - Winner (1): 2009–10
  - Runner-up (1): 2008–09
- SuperTaça de Futsal de Portugal:
  - Runner-up (2): 2009, 2010
