= S.L. Olivais =

Portuguese sports club

SL Olivais
- Full name: Sport Lisboa e Olivais
- Founded: 1934
- Ground: Pavilhão Municipal Casal Vistoso, Lisbon
- Capacity: 1,500
- Chairman: Manuel Luizo
- Manager: Luís Alves
- League: Portuguese Futsal First Division
Home colours	Away colours

Sport Lisboa e Olivais is a Portuguese sports club from Lisbon.

The men's futsal team plays in Portuguese Futsal First Division.

The men's football team plays in the I Série 2 AF Lisboa. The team played on the fourth-tier Terceira Divisão in 1994–95 and from 1996 to 1999. The team also participated in the Taça de Portugal.

== Honours ==
=== Futsal ===
National

- Taça de Portugal de Futsal:
  - Winner (1): 2003–04
- SuperTaça de Futsal de Portugal:
  - Runner-up (1): 2004
