= Taça de Portugal de Futsal =

- Founded: 1997
- Region: Portugal
- Teams: 110
- Current champions: Benfica (9th title)
- Most championships: Sporting (10 titles)

The Taça de Portugal de Futsal (English: Portuguese Futsal Cup) is the main Portuguese national futsal knock-out competition. It has been played yearly since 1997 and is organized by the Portuguese Football Federation. The current holders of the competition are Sporting, who won their 10th title.

== Taça de Portugal finals ==
Season	Winners	Score	Runners-up
1997–98	Miramar	4–1	Sporting
1998–99	Instituto D. João V	2–2 (4–3 p.)	Vila Verde
1999–00	Correio da Manhã	3–1	Freixieiro
2000–01	Jorge Antunes	3–3 (4–3 p.)	Instituto D. João V
2001–02	Jorge Antunes (2)	3–1	Sporting
2002–03	Benfica	5–4	Freixieiro
2003–04	Olivais	4–3	CF Sassoeiros
2004–05	Benfica (2)	4–1	Boavista
2005–06	Sporting	9–5	Benfica
2006–07	Benfica (3)	2–1	Braga/AAUM
2007–08	Sporting (2)	4–1	Jorge Antunes
2008–09	Benfica (4)	4–1	Belenenses
2009–10	Belenenses	2–1 aet	Benfica
2010–11	Sporting (3)	3–2 aet	Benfica
2011–12	Benfica (5)	2–1	Modicus
2012–13	Sporting (4)	7–1	Braga/AAUM
2013–14	AD Fundão	5–5 (7–6 aet)	Benfica
2014–15	Benfica (6)	5–2	AD Fundão
2015–16	Sporting (5)	4–2	Benfica
2016–17	Benfica (7)	5–1	Burinhosa
2017–18	Sporting (6)	6–2	Fabril
2018–19	Sporting (7)	5–5 (3–2 p.)	Benfica
2019–20	Sporting (8)	7–1	Braga/AAUM
2020–21	Cancelled due to the COVID-19 pandemic in Europe		
2021–22	Sporting (9)	4–3	Benfica
2022–23	Benfica (8)	4–1	Sporting
2023–24	Braga/AAUM (1)	5–3 aet	Sporting
2024–25	Sporting (10)	4–3	Benfica
2025–26	Benfica (9)	6–5	Sporting

=== Performance by club ===
Club	Winners	Runners-up	Winning years and runner-up years
Sporting	10	5	1998, 2002, 2006, 2008, 2011, 2013, 2016, 2018, 2019, 2020, 2022, 2023, 2024, 2025, 2026
Benfica	9	8	2003, 2005, 2006, 2007, 2009, 2010, 2011, 2012, 2014, 2015, 2016, 2017, 2019, 2022, 2023 , 2025, 2026
AD Jorge Antunes	2	1	2001, 2002, 2008
Braga/AAUM	1	3	2007, 2013, 2020, 2024
Instituto D. João V	1	1	1999, 2001
Belenenses	1	1	2009, 2010
AD Fundão	1	1	2014, 2015
Miramar	1	0	1998
Correio da Manhã	1	0	2000
Olivais	1	0	2004
Freixieiro	0	2	2000, 2003
Vila Verde	0	1	1999
CF Sassoeiros	0	1	2004
Boavista	0	1	2005
Modicus	0	1	2012
Burinhosa	0	1	2017
Fabril	0	1	2018
