= A.D. Fundão =

Portuguese sports club

AD do Fundão
- Full name: Associação Desportiva do Fundão
- Founded: 1955
- Ground: Pavilhão Municipal do Fundão; Fundão; Portugal
- Capacity: 1,056
- Chairman: António Angeja
- League: Liga Placard
- 2021-22: Overall table: 4th Playoffs: Semifinals
Home colours

Associação Desportiva do Fundão is a sports club based in the city of Fundão, Portugal. The futsal team of Fundão plays in the Portuguese Futsal First Division and won the 2013-14 Portuguese Futsal Cup beating SL Benfica 7–6 in extra time. The club formerly fielded a football team whose highest success was a 13th place in the fourth tier Terceira Divisão during the 1985–86 season.

== Futsal ==
=== Current squad ===
As of 9 March 2023

#	Position	Name	Nationality
2	Goalkeeper	Juan Pinheiro	(Brazil)
31	Goalkeeper	Alexandre Rodrigues	(Portugal)
92	Goalkeeper	Deivão	(Brazil)
6	Defender	Uesler Schaefer	(Brazil)
10	Defender	Thalles Henrique	(Brazil)
18	Defender	Rui Moreira	(Portugal)
4	Winger	Tomás Colaço	(Portugal)
8	Winger	Rafael Freire	(Portugal)
11	Winger	Edmilson Kutchy	(Portugal)
13	Winger	Bebé	(Portugal)
17	Winger	Mário Freitas	(Portugal)
80	Winger	Rafael Semedo	(Portugal)
9	Pivot	Renato Ramba	(Brazil)
97	Pivot	Iury Bahia	(Brazil)

== Football ==
=== League and cup history ===
Season	I	II	III	IV	V	Pts.	Pl.	W	L	T	GS	GA	Diff.	Portuguese Cup
1985-86				13 (D)		25 pts	30	10	5	15	36	50	-14	
1987-88				16 (D)		30 pts	38	10	10	18	38	48	-10	
1990-91				17 (D)		16 pts	34	4	8	22	25	76	-51	
1992-93				17 (D)		18 pts	34	3	12	19	23	66	-43	
1994–95					3	35 pts	34	11	13	10	51	38	13	
1998–99					3	52 pts	26	16	4	6	55	21	+34	
2001-02					12	24 pts	26	6	4	6	55	21	+34	
2002-03					9	34 pts	26	9	7	10	36	38	-2	
2003–04					6	45 pts	26	13	6	7	45	34	+9	
2004–05					6	41 pts	26	11	8	7	49	35	+14	
2005–06				15 (D)		34 pts	32	9	7	16	24	37	-13	
2006–07					2	63 pts	28	19	6	3	70	20	+50	
2007–08					2	57 pts	26	18	3	5	65	17	+48	
2008–09					3	38 pts	22	13	2	8	33	23	+10	
