= Sporting CP (futsal) =

Futsal club in Portugal

- Full name: Sporting Clube de Portugal
- Founded: 4 March 1985; 41 years ago
- Ground: Pavilhão João Rocha
- Capacity: 3,000
- President: Frederico Varandas
- Head coach: Nuno Dias
- League: Liga Placard
- 2023-24: Overall table: 1st Playoffs: Champions
- Website: sporting.pt
Home colours	Away colours	Third colours

Sporting Clube de Portugal (Portuguese pronunciation: [sɨˈpɔɾtĩ ˈkluβɨ ðɨ puɾtuˈɣal]), otherwise referred to as Sporting CP is a professional futsal club, based in Lisbon, Portugal.

The team competes in the Campeonato Nacional da I Divisão de Futsal and plays its home matches at Pavilhão João Rocha.

Sporting CP is one of the founding teams and the first champions of the Campeonato Nacional da I Divisão de Futsal, in 1990/1991, being the Portuguese team with the most titles, both domestic and international. Prior to the domestic first division’s creation, Sporting CP was already a dominant force on a Regional level in the games’ infancy in Portugal.

It is the team who has reached the most finals of the Campeonato Nacional da I Divisão de Futsal (29 times of 35 editions), being the only one to have won it four times in a row and holds the record for most titles in all major Portuguese futsal competitions.

== History ==
Futsal was introduced in Sporting Clube de Portugal in 1985. As a founding member of the first Portuguese League Championship in 1991, Sporting won the league for its first success and inaugural season of Futsal first division. Sporting's first hat trick of came in 1993-95 and from there on started becoming a dominant force as years progressed and have forged a bitter rivalry with their cross town rivals S.L. Benfica. Just like in Football, matches between these two teams is the main highlight of the Portuguese Futsal in all competitions and known as the Lisbon Derby.

In 1995, Sporting fans were forced to choose the modalities to keep in the club, due to financial problems, having chosen handball and futsal, leading to the closure of the basketball, hockey and volleyball sections (which have all returned in the meantime).

In 2002, futsal is officially adopted by UEFA and the UEFA Futsal Cup was created. This first edition was played in Lisbon and organized by Sporting Clube de Portugal, which represented the country as national champion and reached the semi-finals. The 2014-15 edition was also held in Lisbon with Sporting CP once again reaching the final four.

In 2019, Sporting CP won their first UEFA Futsal Champions League after defeating tournament hosts Kairat Almaty by 2-1. In 2021, Sporting CP won their second Futsal Champions League title defeating FC Barcelona 4-3 in Zadar, Croatia. In the 2020-21 season Sporting won its 16th Portuguese First Division Title, beating their eternal rivals Benfica 3-1 at Pavilhão Fidelidade, thus completing the quadruple for the calendar season (minus the Portuguese Cup: cancelled due to Covid-19) and extending Sportings' hegemony in Portuguese futsal.

In the 2025-26 edition of the UEFA Futsal Champions League Sporting faced their Lisbon rivals Benfica in the quarter finals knockout stage, winning 10-8 on aggregate. Only the third time these two Portuguese teams have faced each other at International level, with Sporting advancing to the final four. With the final four being held at Vitrifrigo Arena, Italy, Sporting eliminated Jimbee Cartagena 6-5 on penalties and beat three time winner Palma Futsal 2-0 in the final, to win its third Futsal Champions League.

Domestically and Internationally Sporting is currently the most decorated team in Portugal, with a total of 52 trophies: 19 Portuguese League titles, 10 Portuguese Cups, 6 League Cups, 13 Super Cups, 3 UEFA Futsal Champions League and 1 Intercontinental Futsal Cup. Overall, Sporting holds the record for all five major competitions listed compared to any other Portuguese Futsal team.

== Facilities ==
=== Pavilhão João Rocha ===
Pavilhão João Rocha is a multi-sports arena located in Lisbon. Located next to the Estádio José Alvalade, it is the home of Sporting CP indoor sports teams and was named after former club president João Rocha.

== Honours ==
=== International Competitions ===
- Intercontinental Futsal Cup: 1

2026

- UEFA Futsal Champions League: 3

2018/2019, 2020/2021, 2025/2026

=== Continental Competitions ===
- International Futsal Masters: 4

2018, 2022, 2025, 2026

=== Domestic Competitions ===
- Campeonato Nacional da I Divisão de Futsal: 19 – Record

1990/1991, 1992/1993, 1993/1994, 1994/1995, 1998/1999, 2000/2001, 2003/2004, 2005/2006, 2009/2010, 2010/2011, 2012/2013, 2013/2014, 2015/2016, 2016/2017, 2017/2018, 2020/2021, 2021/2022, 2022/2023, 2023/2024

- Taça de Portugal de Futsal: 10 – Record

2005/2006, 2007/2008, 2010/2011, 2012/2013, 2015/2016, 2017/2018, 2018/2019, 2019/2020, 2021/2022, 2024/2025

- Taça da Liga de Futsal: 6 - Record

2015/2016, 2016/2017, 2020/2021, 2021/2022, 2023/2024, 2024/2025

- Supertaça de Futsal: 13 - Record

2001, 2004, 2008, 2010, 2013, 2014, 2017, 2018, 2019, 2021, 2022, 2025, 2026

=== Regional Competitions ===
- AF Lisbon Championship: 5

1985-86, 1986-87, 1987-88, 1988-89, 1989-90

- Social Media Cup: 5

1986-87, 1987-88, 1988-89, 1989-90, 1991-92

- AF Lisbon Honour Cup: 4

2013-14, 2015-16, 2016-17, 2017-18

== Awards ==
Awards received by the club, by players while playing for the club or by coaches while coaching the club

Best Men's Club in the World

- Sporting CP – 2021

UEFA Best Futsal Club of the Decade (2010-2019)

- Sporting CP – 2019

Best Men's Player in the World

- (Portugal) Pany Varela – 2022

Best Men's Goalkeeper in the World

- (Brazil) Guitta – 2021

Best Men's Young Player in the World

- (Portugal) Zicky Té – 2021

Best Men's Club Coach in the World

- (Portugal) Nuno Dias – 2021

UEFA Futsal Champions League Finals Player of the Tournament

- (Portugal) Zicky Té - 2026

UEFA Futsal Champions League Finals Team of the Tournament

- (Portugal) Zicky Té - 2026
- (Portugal) Bernardo Paçó - 2026
- (Portugal) Tomás Paçó - 2026
- (Brazil) Felipe Valério - 2026

== International Records ==
Records achieved at Sporting CP

All-time Most UEFA Futsal Champions League appearances

- (Portugal) João Matos – 98

Most UEFA Futsal Champions League matches as head coach

- (Portugal) Nuno Dias – 84

== Current Squad ==
As of 11 September 2025

Note: Flags indicate national team as defined under FIFA eligibility rules; some limited exceptions apply. Players may hold more than one non-FIFA nationality.

No.	Pos.	Nation	Player
1	GK	POR	Gonçalo Portugal
4	DF	POR	Tomás Paçó
6	FW	POR	Zicky Té
7	MF	POR	Diogo Santos
8	MF	BRA	Wesley
9	DF	POR	João Matos (captain)
10	MF	POR	Pauleta
11	MF	BRA	Allan Guilherme
14	GK	BRA	Filipe Valério

No.	Pos.	Nation	Player
16	GK	POR	Bernardo Paçó
18	FW	POR	Pedro Santos
25	MF	POR	Bruno Pinto
29	MF	ITA	Alex Merlim
33	MF	KAZ	Taynan
44	DF	POR	Bruno Maior
77	MF	POR	Rúben Freire
70	FW	BRA	Rocha
92	GK	BRA	Henrique Rafagnin
