= Campeonato Nacional da I Divisão de Futsal =

Futsal league in Portugal

- Founded: 1990
- Country: Portugal
- Confederation: UEFA
- Number of clubs: 14
- Level on pyramid: 1
- Relegation to: II Divisão Futsal
- Domestic cup: Portuguese Cup
- International cup: UEFA Futsal Champions League
- Current champions: Benfica (10th title)
- Most championships: Sporting CP (19 titles)
- Broadcaster(s): RTP, Sport TV, Canal 11
- Website: Official website
- Current: 2025–26 Liga Placard Futsal

Campeonato Nacional da I Divisão de Futsal (English: Futsal National Championship First Division), also known as Liga Placard for sponsorship reasons, is the premier professional futsal league in Portugal. Benfica are the current champions, having won 9 titles.

== Format ==
The current format, in place since the 2013–14 season has each of the 14 teams play each other twice, home and away during the regular season in a total of 26 rounds. The top 8 teams then proceed to the playoffs, where the 1st place team plays the 8th place, the 2nd place plays the 7th place, the 3rd place plays the 6th place and the 4th place plays the 5th place. The quarter-finals and semi-finals are played in 1-1-1 format, with the highest-ranked team during the regular season playing at home in the first and, if needed the third game. The final takes place over 5 games in a 2-2-1 format, with the highest-ranked team during the regular season playing the first two games and the fifth game, if needed, at home.

The last two teams in the regular season are relegated to the 2nd Division for the next season, being replaced by the two finalists in the 2nd Division playoff.

== 2021–22 season teams ==
Location of teams in Liga Placard 2021-22

| Team | Location | Stadium | Capacity |
|---|---|---|---|
| Benfica | Lisbon | Pavilhão Fidelidade | 2400 |
| Braga/AAUM | Braga | Pavilhão Desportivo Universitário de Gualtar | 1740 |
| Candoso | Guimarães | Pavilhão Desportivo do CR Candoso | 700 |
| Eléctrico FC | Ponte de Sor | Pavilhão Gimnodesportivo de Ponte de Sor | 720 |
| Fundão | Fundão | Pavilhão Municipal do Fundão | 1056 |
| Futsal Azeméis | Oliveira de Azeméis | Pavilhão Municipal de Oliveira de Azeméis | 250 |
| Leões Porto Salvo | Porto Salvo | Pavilhão dos Leões de Porto Salvo | 660 |
| Modicus | Sandim | Pavilhão do Modicus | 700 |
| Portimonense | Portimão | Pavilhão Gimnodesportivo de Portimão | 235 |
| Quinta dos Lombos | Quinta dos Lombos | Pavilhão Desportivo dos Lombos | 650 |
| Sporting CP | Lisbon | Pavilhão João Rocha | 3000 |
| Viseu 2001 | Viseu | Pavilhão Desportivo Cidade de Viseu | 1200 |
| Torreense | Torres Vedras | Pavilhão Física de Torres Vedras | 1000 |
| Nun'Álvares | Fafe | Pavilhão do Nun'Álvares | 1500 |

== Portuguese champions ==
| Season | Champions | Runners-up | Third-place | Top Scorer | Club | Goals |
|---|---|---|---|---|---|---|
| 1991 | Sporting | Portela | Estoril Praia | | | |
| 1992 | Santos da Venda Nova | Atlético CP | AMSAC | | | |
| 1993 | Sporting (2) | Esperança Viva | Atlético CP & Beneditense | | | |
| 1993–94 | Sporting (3) | Atlético CP | Recordação de Apolo | | | |
| 1994–95 | Sporting (4) | Correio da Manhã | SC Coimbrões | | | |
| 1995–96 | Correio da Manhã | Sporting | Miramar | | | |
| 1996–97 | Miramar | SC Coimbrões | Correio da Manhã | | | |
| 1997–98 | Correio da Manhã (2) | Sporting | Recordação de Apolo | | | |
| 1998–99 | Sporting (5) | Miramar | Correio da Manhã | | | |
| 1999–2000 | Miramar (2) | Sporting | Atlético CP | | | |
| 2000–01 | Sporting (6) | Miramar | Atlético CP | | | |
| 2001–02 | AR Freixieiro | Benfica | Jorge Antunes | | | |
| 2002–03 | Benfica | Sporting | Jorge Antunes | | | |
| 2003–04 | Sporting (7) | Benfica | AR Freixieiro | | | |
| 2004–05 | Benfica (2) | Sporting | Jorge Antunes & Olivais | | | |
| 2005–06 | Sporting (8) | Benfica | AR Freixieiro & Olivais | | | |
| 2006–07 | Benfica (3) | Sporting | AR Freixieiro & Jorge Antunes | | | |
| 2007–08 | Benfica (4) | Belenenses | AR Freixieiro & Sporting | | | |
| 2008–09 | Benfica (5) | Belenenses | AR Freixieiro & Jorge Antunes | | | |
| 2009–10 | Sporting (9) | Benfica | Belenenses & Instituto D. João V | | | |
| 2010–11 | Sporting (10) | Benfica | AD Fundão & Instituto D. João V | | | |
| 2011–12 | Benfica (6) | Sporting | Modicus & Leões Porto Salvo | | | |
| 2012–13 | Sporting (11) | Benfica | AD Fundão & Rio Ave | | | |
| 2013–14 | Sporting (12) | AD Fundão | Benfica & Braga/AAUM | Ré | Leões Porto Salvo | 35 |
| 2014–15 | Benfica (7) | Sporting | Braga/AAUM & AD Fundão | Alessandro Patias | Benfica | 36 |
| 2015–16 | Sporting (13) | Benfica | Braga/AAUM & Burinhosa | Diogo | Sporting | 35 |
| 2016–17 | Sporting (14) | Braga/AAUM | Benfica & Modicus | Diego Cavinato | Sporting | 36 |
| 2017–18 | Sporting (15) | Benfica | Braga/AAUM & Modicus | Rodolfo Fortino | Sporting | 32 |
| 2018–19 | Benfica (8) | Sporting | AD Fundão & Modicus | Fernandinho | Benfica | 39 |
| 2019–20 | Cancelled after 20 rounds due to the COVID-19 pandemic in Europe | | | Júnior | Viseu 2001 | 24 |
| 2020–21 | Sporting (16) | Benfica | AD Fundão & Leões de Porto Salvo | Diego Cavinato | Sporting | 38 |
| 2021–22 | Sporting (17) | Benfica | AD Fundão & Eléctrico FC | Ivan Chishkala | Benfica | 26 |
| 2022–23 | Sporting (18) | Benfica | Braga/AAUM & Leões de Porto Salvo | Diego Cavinato | Sporting | 35 |
| 2023–24 | Sporting (19) | Braga/AAUM | Benfica & Leões de Porto Salvo | Taynan | Sporting | 25 |
| 2024–25 | Benfica (9) | Sporting | Braga/AAUM & Leões de Porto Salvo | Taynan | Sporting | 24 |
| 2025–26 | Benfica (10) | Sporting | Braga/AAUM & Leões de Porto Salvo | Bruno Pinto | Sporting | 26 |

=== Performance by club ===
| Team | Winners | Runners-up | Third-place | Years won | Years runners-up | Years third-place |
|---|---|---|---|---|---|---|
| Sporting | 19 | 11 | 1 | 1991, 1993, 1994, 1995, 1999, 2001, 2004, 2006, 2010, 2011, 2013, 2014, 2016, 2017, 2018, 2021, 2022, 2023, 2024 | 1996, 1998, 2000, 2003, 2005, 2007, 2012, 2015, 2019, 2025, 2026 | 2008 |
| Benfica | 10 | 11 | 3 | 2003, 2005, 2007, 2008, 2009, 2012, 2015, 2019, 2025, 2026 | 2002, 2004, 2006, 2010, 2011, 2013, 2016, 2018, 2021, 2022, 2023 | 2014, 2017, 2024 |
| Miramar | 2 | 2 | 1 | 1997, 2000 | 1999, 2001 | 1996 |
| Correio da Manhã | 2 | 1 | 2 | 1996, 1998 | 1995 | 1997, 1999 |
| AR Freixieiro | 1 | 0 | 5 | 2002 | – | 2004, 2006, 2007, 2008, 2009 |
| Santos da Venda Nova | 1 | 0 | 0 | 1992 | – | – |
| Braga/AAUM | 0 | 2 | 7 | – | 2017, 2024 | 2014, 2015, 2016, 2018, 2023, 2025, 2026 |
| Atlético CP | 0 | 2 | 3 | – | 1992, 1994 | 1993, 2000, 2001 |
| Belenenses | 0 | 2 | 1 | – | 2008, 2009 | 2010 |
| AD Fundão | 0 | 1 | 6 | – | 2014 | 2011, 2013, 2015, 2019, 2021, 2022 |
| SC Coimbrões | 0 | 1 | 1 | – | 1997 | 1995 |
| Portela | 0 | 1 | 0 | – | 1991 | – |
| Esperança Viva | 0 | 1 | 0 | – | 1993 | – |
| Leões Porto Salvo | 0 | 0 | 6 | – | – | 2012, 2021, 2023, 2024, 2025, 2026 |
| AD Jorge Antunes | 0 | 0 | 5 | – | – | 2002, 2003, 2005, 2007, 2009 |
| Modicus | 0 | 0 | 4 | – | – | 2012, 2017, 2018, 2019 |
| Recordação de Apolo | 0 | 0 | 2 | – | – | 1994, 1998 |
| Olivais | 0 | 0 | 2 | – | – | 2005, 2006 |
| Instituto D. João V | 0 | 0 | 2 | – | – | 2010, 2011 |
| Estoril Praia | 0 | 0 | 1 | – | – | 1991 |
| AMSAC | 0 | 0 | 1 | – | – | 1992 |
| Beneditense | 0 | 0 | 1 | – | – | 1993 |
| Rio Ave | 0 | 0 | 1 | – | – | 2013 |
| Burinhosa | 0 | 0 | 1 | – | – | 2016 |
| Eléctrico FC | 0 | 0 | 1 | – | – | 2022 |

== Media coverage ==
As of the 2020–21 season, Sport TV and Canal 11 are the official broadcasters of the league. Both Benfica and Sporting CP home games are also broadcast on Benfica TV and Sporting TV, respectively.
