= 2006–07 Campeonato Nacional da 1ª Divisão de Futsal =

Portuguese Futsal First Division
- Season: 2006–07
- Champions: Benfica (3rd title)

The 2006–07 season of the Portuguese Futsal First Division was the 17th season of top-tier futsal in Portugal, and was won by Benfica.

== Teams ==
- FC Alpendorada
- CF Belenenses
- SL Benfica
- Boavista FC
- AR Freixieiro
- FJ Antunes
- AD Fundão
- ARCD Junqueira
- Modicus
- Odivelas
- SL Olivais
- Sporting CP
- SC Braga
- SC Pombal

== League table ==
P	Team	Pts	Pld	W	D	L	GF	GA	GD	Qualification or relegation
1	Benfica	68	26	22	2	2	157	62	+95	Title play-off
2	Fundação Jorge Antunes	62	26	19	5	2	116	55	+61	Title play-off
3	Sporting CP	60	26	19	3	4	109	53	+56	Title play-off
4	Freixieiro	59	26	18	5	3	126	68	+58	Title play-off
5	Sporting de Pombal	48	26	13	9	4	90	86	+4	Title play-off
6	SL Olivais	33	26	10	3	13	90	90	0	Title play-off
7	Alpendorada	32	26	9	5	12	86	92	-6	Title play-off
8	Belenenses	32	26	9	5	12	69	86	-17	Title play-off
9	Boavista	31	26	9	4	13	78	100	-22	Play-out
10	Fundão	25	26	7	4	15	75	90	-15	Play-out
11	Módicus	21	26	7	0	19	72	107	-35	Play-out
12	Sporting de Braga	20	26	5	5	16	54	114	-60	Play-out
13	Odivelas	17	26	3	8	15	58	123	-65	Play-out
14	Junqueira	6	26	0	6	20	74	128	-54	Play-out

== Play-offs ==
Quarter-finals
1	Benfica	2	4	9
8	Belenenses	0	1	4
4	Freixieiro	2	2	7	6
5	SC Pombal	1	3	3	1
2	FJ Antunes	2	3*	1
7	Alpendorada	0	2*	0
3	Sporting CP	2	4	5
6	SL Olivais	0	2	3

Semi-finals
1	Benfica	2	5	6 (3)
4	Freixieiro	0	3	6 (2)
2	FJ Antunes	1	5	4 (3)	1
3	Sporting CP	2	1	4 (4)	3

Final
1	Benfica	2	4	1	1
3	Sporting CP	1	1	2	0

Extra Time = *

=== Quarter-finals ===
May 20, 2007
16:15

Belenenses	1–4	Benfica
Eduardo Miguel Fernandes 12'	(Report)	André Lima 4'; Ricardo Braga 8', 22'; Márcio May 10'

Pavilhão Acácio Rosa, Lisbon

May 26, 2007
16:00

Benfica	9–4	Belenenses
Zé Maria 1', 6'; Gonçalo Alves 2', 12'; André Lima 16'; Márcio May 24'; Ricardo Braga 30'; Sidnei 32'; João Correia 36'	(Report)	Drula 3', 25'; Guga 5'; Eduardo Miguel Fernandes 37'

Pavilhão EDP, Lisbon

May 19, 2007
19:00

SC Pombal	3–2	Freixieiro
Roger 4'; Néné 5'; Batalha 29'	(Report)	Wilson 35'; Ivan Dias 38'

Pavilhão do Instituto D.João V, Louriçal

May 26, 2007
18:00

Freixieiro	7–3	SC Pombal
Israel Alves 2', 9', 25', 27'; Ricardo Fernandes 10'; Wilson 20'; Júlio César 22'	(Report)	Nino 23'; João Castro 36'; Néné 40'

Pavilhão da AR Freixieiro, Matosinhos

May 27, 2007
18:00

Freixieiro	6–1	SC Pombal
Daniel Souza 5', 35'; Wilson 25'; Israel Alves 26', 34'; Ivan Dias 32'	(Report)	Nino 10'

Pavilhão da AR Freixieiro, Matosinhos

May 19, 2007
16:00

Alpendorada	2–3 (AET)	FJ Antunes
Artur Camarão 14'; Moita 17'	(Report)	Fábio Aguiar 10'; Gabriel 36'; André Kerber 43'

Pavilhão da EB 2,3 de Alpendorada, Marco de Canavezes

May 26, 2007
15:00

FJ Antunes	1–0	Alpendorada
Fábio Aguiar 15'	(Report)

Pavilhão Municipal de Vizela, Vizela

May 20, 2007
18:00

SL Olivais	2–4	Sporting CP
João Pires 11', 22'	(Report)	Deo 9', 40'; Zezito 10'; Davi 18'

Pavilhão do Complexo Desportivo Municipal do Casal Vistoso, Lisbon

May 26, 2007
17:30

Sporting CP	5–3	SL Olivais
Davi 3'; Deo 10', 30'; Zezito 29', 36'	(Report)	João Pires 4', 36'; Pedro Ferreira 25'

Pavilhão Paz e Amizade, Loures

=== Semi-finals ===
June 2, 2007
16:00

Freixieiro	3–5	Benfica
Dandan Souza 6'; Wilson Vaz 35'; Israel Alves 39'	(Report)	Luís Estrela 13'; Sidnei 18'; Ricardinho 28', 28'; Pedro Costa 38'

Pavilhão da AR Freixieiro, Matosinhos

June 9, 2007
15:10

Benfica	6–6 (AET) (3–2 PSO)	Freixieiro
Zé Maria 2', 25'; Ricardinho 5', 17'; Gonçalo Alves 21', 44'	(Report)	Dandan Souza 7', 9'; Israel Alves 15'; Ivan Dias 23', 45'; Ricardo Fernandes 43'
Penalties
(penalty missed) Jony; (penalty scored) Amandus; (penalty scored) Sidnei; (penalty scored) Luís Estrela	3–2	Ivan Dias (penalty scored); Israel Alves (penalty missed); Júlio César (penalty missed); Dandan Souza (penalty scored); Ricardo Fernandes (penalty missed)

Pavilhão Açoreana Seguros, Lisbon

June 3, 2007
19:00

Sporting CP	1–5	FJ Antunes
Davi 24'	(Report)	Divanei 22', 26', 38', 39'; Fábio Aguiar 32'

Pavilhão Paz e Amizade, Loures

June 10, 2007
18:00

FJ Antunes	4–4 (AET) (2–4 PSO)	Sporting CP
Côco 3', 38', 43'; Gabriel 11'	(Report)	Zezito 19'; Evandro Souza 27'; Adolfo Wulf 35'; Gonçalo Barão 45'
Penalties
(penalty scored) Fábio Aguiar; (penalty missed) Côco; (penalty missed) Marinho; (penalty scored) Andrezinho	2–4	Deo (penalty missed); Adolfo Wulf (penalty scored); Edinho (penalty scored); Gonçalo Barão (penalty scored); Evandro Souza (penalty scored)

Pavilhão Municipal de Vizela, Vizela

June 11, 2007
20:00

FJ Antunes	1–3	Sporting CP
Fábio Ribeiro 25'	(Report)	Davi 23'; Nenê 29'; Cristiano Parreiro 39'

Pavilhão Municipal de Vizela, Vizela

=== Final ===
June 17, 2007
16:15

Sporting CP	1–4	Benfica
Evandro Souza 4'	(Report)	Ricardinho 15', 25', 28'; Pedro Costa 34'

Pavilhão Paz e Amizade, Loures
Attendance: 2,500

June 23, 2007
21:00

Benfica	1–2	Sporting CP
Ricardinho 13'	(Report)	Davi 5'; Zé Maria 14' (o.g.)

Pavilhão Açoreana Seguros, Lisbon
Attendance: 3,000

June 24, 2007
19:30

Benfica	1–0	Sporting CP
Zé Maria 4'

Pavilhão Açoreana Seguros, Lisbon
Attendance: 3,000

2006/2007 Portuguese Futsal First Division Winners

S.L. Benfica
Third title

== Play-out ==
Each team started with half of the points conquered in the regular phase.

	Team	P	W	D	L	F	A	Pts
1	Boavista	5	3	0	2	17	6	25
2	Fundão	5	3	2	0	29	19	24
3	SC Braga	5	1	3	1	36	15	16
4	Modicus	5	1	1	3	21	24	15
5	Odivelas	5	1	0	4	9	43	12
6	Junqueira	5	2	2	1	15	15	11
