= 2016–17 Liga Sport Zone =

Liga Portuguesa de Futsal
- Season: 2016–17
- Champions: Sporting CP; 14th title
- Relegated: CS São João; Os Vinhais
- UEFA Futsal Cup: Sporting CP; Braga/AAUM

The 2016-17 season of the Liga Portuguesa de Futsal was the 27th season of top-tier futsal in Portugal. It was named Liga Sport Zone for sponsorship reasons. The regular season started on October 8, 2016, and ended on May 6, 2017. After the end of the regular season, the top eight teams played the championship playoffs.

Sporting CP won the competition for the second time in a row, while Sporting Clube de Braga/AAUM made its debut in championship finals. Both teams qualified for 2017–18 UEFA Futsal Cup.

== Teams ==
Location of teams in Liga Sport Zone 2016-17

Team	Location	Stadium	Capacity
Belenenses	Lisbon	Pavilhão Acácio Rosa	1683
Benfica	Lisbon	Pavilhão Fidelidade	2400
Braga/AAUM	Braga	Pavilhão Desportivo Universitário de Gualtar	1740
Burinhosa	Burinhosa	Pavilhão Gimnodesportivo da Burinhosa	300
CS São João	São Martinho do Bispo	Pavilhão do Centro Social de São João	700
Fundão	Fundão	Pavilhão Municipal do Fundão	1056
Futsal Azeméis	Oliveira de Azeméis	Pavilhão Municipal de Oliveira de Azeméis	250
Leões Porto Salvo	Porto Salvo	Pavilhão dos Leões de Porto Salvo	700
Modicus Sandim	Sandim	Pavilhão do Modicus	700
Os Vinhais	São Domingos de Rana	Pavilhão dos Vinhais	350
Quinta dos Lombos	Quinta dos Lombos	Pavilhão Desportivo dos Lombos	650
Rio Ave	Vila do Conde	Pavilhão Municipal de Desportos	800
Sporting CP	Lisbon	Pavilhão Multiusos de Odivelas	2000
Unidos Pinheirense	Valbom	Pavilhão Municipal de Valbom	500

== League table ==
P	Team	Pts	Pld	W	D	L	GF	GA	GD	Qualification or relegation
1	Sporting CP	72	26	23	3	0	144	35	+109	Title Play-off
2	Benfica	65	26	20	5	1	106	39	+67	Title Play-off
3	Braga/AAUM	54	26	16	6	4	101	62	+39	Title Play-off
4	Belenenses	51	26	16	3	7	86	73	+13	Title Play-off
5	Modicus Sandim	47	26	14	5	7	109	76	+33	Title Play-off
6	Fundão	35	26	11	2	13	78	95	-17	Title Play-off
7	Burinhosa	32	26	10	2	14	86	99	-13	Title Play-off
8	Futsal Azeméis	30	26	7	9	10	78	94	-16	Title Play-off
9	Rio Ave	30	26	8	6	12	86	95	-9	
10	Unidos Pinheirense	26	26	8	2	16	75	112	-37	
11	Quinta dos Lombos	26	26	8	2	16	62	102	-40	
12	Leões Porto Salvo	20	26	5	5	16	76	109	-33	
13	CS São João	19	26	5	4	17	70	102	-32	Relegation
14	Os Vinhais	11	26	3	2	21	68	132	-64	Relegation

== Title Playoffs ==
Quarterfinals
1	Sporting CP	5	6
8	Futsal Azeméis	1	2
4	Belenenses	2*(3p)	4	2
5	Modicus Sandim	2 (2p)	1	4
2	Benfica	4	7
7	Burinhosa	0	0
3	Braga/AAUM	7	2	8
6	Fundão	1	4	2

Semifinals
1	Sporting CP	5	5
5	Modicus Sandim	2	2
2	Benfica	3 (1p)	1
3	Braga/AAUM	3*(2p)	2

Finals
1	Sporting CP	3	4	6	3
3	Braga/AAUM	1	5	1	1

Extra Time = *

== See also ==
- Futsal in Portugal
