= 2010 UEFA Futsal Championship final =

2010 UEFA Futsal Championship
- Event: 2010 UEFA Futsal Championship
Portugal	Spain
(Portugal)	(Spain)
2	4
- Date: 30 January 2010
- Venue: Főnix Arena, Debrecen
- Referee: Massimo Cumbo (Italy)
- Attendance: 7,000

The final of UEFA Futsal Championship 2010 was a futsal match played on 30 January 2010 at the Főnix Arena in Debrecen, Hungary to determine the winner of 2010 UEFA Futsal Championship. The match was contested by Portugal and Spain, and won by Spain by 4 goals to 2 goals.

== Match details ==
30 January 2010
20:30

Portugal	2 – 4	Spain
Gonçalo 38'; Joel 39'	Report	Ortiz 9'; Javi Rodríguez 13'; Lin 36'; Daniel 40'

Főnix Arena, Debrecen
Attendance: 7,000
Referee: Massimo Cumbo (Italy)

Portugal	Spain

PORTUGAL:
GK	12	Bébé
FP	4	Pedro Costa
FP	6	Arnaldo
FP	9	Gonçalo Alves
FP	13	Pedro Cary
Substitutions:
GK	1	João Benedito
FP	2	Evandro
FP	3	Leitão
FP	5	Joel Queirós
FP	7	Cardinal	(yellow card) 28'
FP	8	Israel
FP	11	João Matos
Manager:
(Portugal) Orlando Duarte

SPAIN:
GK	1	Luis Amado
FP	6	Álvaro
FP	7	Javi Rodríguez
FP	8	Kike	(yellow card) 38'
FP	10	Borja
Substitutions:
GK	12	Juanjo
FP	2	Ortiz
FP	4	Torras
FP	5	Fernandão
FP	9	Juanra
FP	11	Lin
FP	14	Daniel
Manager:
(Spain) José Venancio López

- Second referee

(Hungary) Gabor Kovacs

- Third referee

(Germany) Stephan Kammerer

- Timekeeper

(Finland) Tommi Grönman

- UEFA Delegate

(Croatia) Boris Durlen

- UEFA Delegate

(Croatia) Ivan Novak
