= UEFA Futsal Euro 2014 =

Europees kampioenschap zaalvoetbal 2014 Championnat d'Europe de futsal 2014 Futsal-Europameisterschaft 2014

Tournament details
- Host country: Belgium
- Dates: 28 January – 8 February
- Teams: 12
- Venues: 2 (in 1 host city)

Final positions
- Champions: Italy (2nd title)
- Runners-up: Russia
- Third place: Spain
- Fourth place: Portugal

Tournament statistics
- Matches played: 20
- Goals scored: 121 (6.05 per match)
- Attendance: 90,751 (4,538 per match)
- Top scorer: (Russia) Eder Lima (8 goals)
- Best player: (Italy) Gabriel Lima

The UEFA Futsal Euro 2014 was the ninth edition of the European Championship for men's national futsal teams organised by UEFA. It was hosted for the first time in Belgium, from 28 January to 8 February 2014, following a decision of the UEFA Executive Committee in December 2011.

The final tournament was contested by twelve teams, eleven of which joined the hosts after overcoming a qualifying tournament. The matches were played in two venues in the city of Antwerp, the Lotto Arena (group stage) and the Sportpaleis (knockout stage). Television coverage was provided by Eurosport and Eurosport 2.

The defending champions, Spain, were beaten in the semifinals by Russia and thus failed to reach their fifth consecutive tournament final. In the decisive match, Italy defeated Russia 3–1 to win their second title. Spain defeated Portugal 8–4 in the third place match to secure a ninth consecutive podium finish. The top scorer of the tournament was Eder Lima of Russia, with eight goals.

== Venues ==
Location of the 2014 UEFA Futsal Euro final tournament host city in Belgium

The final tournament matches were played in two venues located in Antwerp's Merksem district. The Lotto Arena hosted the twelve group stage matches, while the remaining eight matches, including the final, were staged in the Sportpaleis arena.

Antwerp
Lotto Arena	Sportpaleis
5,218	15,089

== Qualification ==
The qualification draw was made in Nyon on 4 December 2012.

=== Qualified teams ===
Country	Qualified as	Previous appearances in tournament^{1, 2}
Belgium	Hosts	4 (1996, 1999, 2003, 2010)
Italy	Group 1 winner	8 (1996, 1999, 2001, **2003**, 2005, 2007, 2010, 2012)
Azerbaijan	Group 2 winner	2 (2010, 2012)
Russia	Group 3 winner	8 (1996, **1999**, 2001, 2003, 2005, 2007, 2010, 2012)
Spain	Group 4 winner	8 (**1996**, 1999, **2001**, 2003, **2005**, **2007**, **2010**, **2012**)
Portugal	Group 5 winner	6 (1999, 2003, 2005, 2007, 2010, 2012)
Czech Republic	Group 6 winner	6 (2001, 2003, 2005, 2007, 2010, 2012)
Slovenia	Group 7 winner	3 (2003, 2010, 2012)
Ukraine	Play-off winner	7 (1996, 2001, 2003, 2005, 2007, 2010, 2012)
Romania	Play-off winner	2 (2007, 2012)
Netherlands	Play-off winner	4 (1996, 1999, 2001, 2005)
Croatia	Play-off winner	3 (1999, 2001, 2012)

^{1} Bold indicates champion for that year
^{2} Italic indicates host for that year

=== Draw ===
The final tournament draw was held in Antwerp's Centrum Elzenveld, on 4 October 2013.

Pot 1	Pot 2	Pot 3
Belgium (hosts; assigned to A1); Spain (holders); Italy; Russia	Portugal; Ukraine; Czech Republic; Azerbaijan	Croatia; Romania; Slovenia; Netherlands

== Match officials ==
UEFA named sixteen match officials to referee matches at the 2014 UEFA Futsal Euro final tournament.

Nationality	Name	Date of birth
Austria	Gerald Bauernfeind	1 April 1981
Belgium	Pascal Lemal	21 November 1972
Croatia	Saša Tomić	23 August 1975
Czech Republic	Ondřej Černý	11 April 1979
England	Marc Birkett	3 February 1978
Finland	Timo Onatsu	17 March 1973
Hungary	Balázs Farkas	25 March 1975
Italy	Alessandro Malfer	23 January 1975
Poland	Sebastian Stawicki	23 January 1975
Portugal	Eduardo José Fernandes Coelho	10 October 1979
Romania	Bogdan Sorescu	21 August 1974
Russia	Ivan Shabanov	15 August 1978
Slovenia	Borut Šivic	20 April 1971
Spain	Fernando Gutiérrez Lumbreras	26 January 1971
Turkey	Kamil Çetin	11 October 1984
Ukraine	Oleg Ivanov	12 October 1972

== Squads ==
Map of the UEFA Futsal Euro 2014 finalist teams and their performances.

== Group stage ==
In the group stage, a total of twelve matches (three matches per group) were played between 28 January and 2 February at a rate of two matches each day. The teams finishing in the top two positions in each of the four groups progressed to the knockout stage, while the third-placed team was eliminated from the tournament.

Tie-breaking

If two or more teams were equal on points on completion of the group matches, the following tie-breaking criteria were applied:

1. Higher number of points obtained in the matches played between the teams in question;
2. Superior goal difference resulting from the matches played between the teams in question;
3. Higher number of goals scored in the matches played between the teams in question.

If, after having applied criteria 1–3, teams still have an equal ranking, criteria 1–3 are reapplied to determine their final ranking. If this does not lead to a decision, the following criteria apply:

1. Superior goal difference in all group matches;
2. Higher number of goals scored in all group matches;
3. Fair play ranking of the teams in question;
4. Drawing of lots.

Key to colours in group tables
Team advanced to the knockout stage

All times local (CET or UTC+01:00).

=== Group A ===
Team	Pld	W	D	L	GF	GA	GD	Pts
Ukraine	2	1	1	0	1	0	+1	4
Romania	2	1	0	1	6	2	+4	3
Belgium	2	0	1	1	1	6	−5	1

28 January 2014
21:00

Belgium	1–6	Romania
Rahou 23'	Report	Răducu 3'; Matei 14'; Lupu 22'; Șotărcă 32'; Iancu 35'; Salhi 39' (o.g.)

Lotto Arena, Antwerp
Attendance: 3,760
Referee: Alessandro Malfer (Italy)

30 January 2014
18:30

Romania	0–1	Ukraine
	Report	Sorokin 17'

Lotto Arena, Antwerp
Attendance: 2,544
Referee: Ondřej Černý (Czech Republic)

1 February 2014
20:45

Ukraine	0–0	Belgium
	Report

Lotto Arena, Antwerp
Attendance: 3,724
Referee: Saša Tomić (Croatia)

=== Group B ===
Team	Pld	W	D	L	GF	GA	GD	Pts
Russia	2	1	1	0	11	5	+6	4
Portugal	2	1	1	0	9	4	+5	4
Netherlands	2	0	0	2	1	12	−11	0

28 January 2014
18:30

Russia	7–1	Netherlands
Cirilo 4', 12'; Lyskov 10'; Eder Lima 15', 35'; Sergeev 21'; Robinho 23'	Report	Attaibi 28'

Lotto Arena, Antwerp
Attendance: 3,248
Referee: Fernando Gutiérrez Lumbreras (Spain)

30 January 2014
20:45

Netherlands	0–5	Portugal
	Report	João Matos 6'; Joel 13'; Cardinal 36'; Bruno Coelho 38', 39'

Lotto Arena, Antwerp
Attendance: 3,629
Referee: Saša Tomić (Croatia)

1 February 2014
18:30

Portugal	4–4	Russia
Ricardinho 23'; Gonçalo 29', 34'; Fukin 32' (o.g.)	Report	Abramov 23'; Pereverzev 25'; Eder Lima 30', 35'

Lotto Arena, Antwerp
Attendance: 3,515
Referee: Timo Onatsu (Finland)

=== Group C ===
Team	Pld	W	D	L	GF	GA	GD	Pts
Italy	2	1	0	1	9	3	+6	3
Slovenia	2	1	0	1	9	9	0	3
Azerbaijan	2	1	0	1	7	13	−6	3

29 January 2014
20:45

Italy	2–3	Slovenia
Fortino 24'; Saad 40'	Report	Vrhovec 11'; Čujec 26'; Osredkar 39'

Lotto Arena, Antwerp
Attendance: 3,649
Referee: Oleg Ivanov (Ukraine)

31 January 2014
20:45

Slovenia	6–7	Azerbaijan
Vrhovec 1', 20', 29'; Čujec 17'; Kroflič 26'; Fetić 37'	Report	Amadeu 1'; Rafael 24', 39'; Borisov 29'; Augusto 31'; Felipe 36'; Edu 40'

Lotto Arena, Antwerp
Attendance: 2,321
Referee: Eduardo Fernandes Coelho (Portugal)

2 February 2014
18:30

Azerbaijan	0–7	Italy
	Report	Romano 2'; Fortino 4'; Honorio 16'; Vampeta 25'; Gabriel Lima 27'; Mammarella 32'; Miarelli 40'

Lotto Arena, Antwerp
Attendance: 3,298
Referee: Marc Birkett (England)

=== Group D ===
Team	Pld	W	D	L	GF	GA	GD	Pts
Spain	2	1	1	0	11	4	+7	4
Croatia	2	0	2	0	6	6	0	2
Czech Republic	2	0	1	1	4	11	−7	1

29 January 2014
18:30

Spain	3–3	Croatia
Aicardo 16'; Lin 27', 28'	Report	Babić 10'; Jelovčić 18'; Capar 38'

Lotto Arena, Antwerp
Attendance: 3,528
Referee: Pascal Lemal (Belgium)

31 January 2014
18:30

Croatia	3–3	Czech Republic
Jelovčić 14'; Marinović 16'; Capar 39'	Report	Novotný 9'; Mareš 21'; Belej 24'

Lotto Arena, Antwerp
Attendance: 2,002
Referee: Ivan Shabanov (Russia)

2 February 2014
20:45

Czech Republic	1–8	Spain
Belej 26'	Report	Fernandão 7', 23'; Sergio Lozano 20' (pen.), 37'; Ortiz 25'; José Ruiz 33'; Raúl Campos 35'; Pola 38'

Lotto Arena, Antwerp
Attendance: 3,433
Referee: Bogdan Sorescu (Romania)

== Knockout stage ==
The knockout stage matches, which includes quarter-finals, semi-finals, third place play-off and the final, will be played at the Sportpaleis arena. If a match is drawn after 40 minutes of regular play, an extra-time consisting of two five-minute periods is played. If teams are still leveled after extra-time, a penalty shoot-out is used to determine the winner. In the third place match, the extra-time is skipped and the decision goes directly to kicks from the penalty mark.

=== Bracket ===
Quarter-finals
3 February – Antwerp (Sportpaleis)
Ukraine	1
Portugal	2
4 February – Antwerp (Sportpaleis)
Italy	2
Croatia	1
3 February – Antwerp (Sportpaleis)
Romania	0
Russia	6
4 February – Antwerp (Sportpaleis)
Slovenia	0
Spain	4

Semi-finals
6 February – Antwerp (Sportpaleis)
Portugal	3
Italy	4
6 February – Antwerp (Sportpaleis)
Russia (a.e.t.)	4
Spain	3

Final
8 February – Antwerp (Sportpaleis)
Italy	3
Russia	1
Third place
8 February – Antwerp (Sportpaleis)
Portugal	4
Spain	8

=== Quarterfinals ===
3 February 2014
18:00

Ukraine	1–2	Portugal
Valenko 13'	Report	Cardinal 3', 23'

Sportpaleis, Antwerp
Attendance: 3,702
Referee: Balázs Farkas (Hungary)

3 February 2014
20:30

Romania	0–6	Russia
	Report	Robinho 3'; Shayakhmetov 8'; Eder Lima 9', 16', 37'; Sergeev 34'

Sportpaleis, Antwerp
Attendance: 4,124
Referee: Borut Šivic (Slovenia)

4 February 2014
18:00

Italy	2–1	Croatia
Romano 1'; Fortino 10'	Report	Jelovčić 7'

Sportpaleis, Antwerp
Attendance: 3,225
Referee: Fernando Gutiérrez Lumbreras (Spain)

4 February 2014
20:30

Slovenia	0–4	Spain
	Report	Fernandão 11'; Rafa Usín 17'; Aicardo 36', 39'

Sportpaleis, Antwerp
Attendance: 3,893
Referee: Alessandro Malfer (Italy)

=== Semifinals ===
6 February 2014
18:00

Portugal	3–4	Italy
Ricardinho 13'; Arnaldo 19'; Joel 35'	Report	Gabriel Lima 1', 31'; Romano 23'; Fortino 35'

Sportpaleis, Antwerp
Attendance: 6,833
Referee: Ondřej Černý (Czech Republic)

6 February 2014
20:30

Russia	4–3 (a.e.t.)	Spain
Sergeev 22'; Lyskov 26'; Fukin 26'; Robinho 49'	Report	Pola 16'; Rafa Usín 26'; Miguelín 38'

Sportpaleis, Antwerp
Attendance: 8,152
Referee: Saša Tomić (Croatia)

=== Third place match ===
8 February 2014
18:00

Portugal	4–8	Spain
Ricardinho 8'; Pedro Cary 12'; Pedro Costa 26'; Joel 36'	Report	Fernandão 6', 38'; José Ruíz 7'; Sergio Lozano 7'; Miguelín 17'; Rafa Usín 18'; Raúl Campos 20'; Pola 40'

Sportpaleis, Antwerp
Attendance: 10,619
Referee: Alessandro Malfer (Italy)

=== Final ===
8 February 2014
20:30

Italy	3–1	Russia
Gabriel Lima 7'; Murilo 14'; Giasson 19'	Report	Eder Lima 10'

Sportpaleis, Antwerp
Attendance: 11,552
Referee: Fernando Gutiérrez Lumbreras (Spain)

2014 UEFA Futsal Championship winners

Italy
2nd title

== Tournament ranking ==
Per statistical convention in football, matches decided in extra time are counted as wins and losses, while matches decided by penalty shoot-out are counted as draws.

Pos	Team	Pld	W	D	L	GF	GA	GD	Pts	Final result
1	Italy	5	4	0	1	18	8	+10	12	Champions
2	Russia	5	3	1	1	22	11	+11	10	Runners-up
3	Spain	5	3	1	1	26	12	+14	10	Third place
4	Portugal	5	2	1	2	18	17	+1	7	Fourth place
5	Ukraine	3	1	1	1	2	2	0	4	Eliminated in Quarter-finals
6	Romania	3	1	0	2	6	8	–2	3	Eliminated in Quarter-finals
7	Slovenia	3	1	0	2	9	13	–4	3	Eliminated in Quarter-finals
8	Croatia	3	0	2	1	7	8	–1	2	Eliminated in Quarter-finals
9	Azerbaijan	2	1	0	1	7	13	–6	3	Eliminated in Group stage
10	Belgium	2	0	1	1	1	6	–5	1	Eliminated in Group stage
11	Czech Republic	2	0	1	1	4	11	–7	1	Eliminated in Group stage
12	Netherlands	2	0	0	2	1	12	–11	0	Eliminated in Group stage

== Goalscorers ==
Only goals scored in the final tournament are considered.

8 goals

- (Russia) Eder Lima

5 goals

- (Spain) Fernandão

4 goals

- (Italy) Rodolfo Fortino
- (Italy) Gabriel Lima
- (Slovenia) Gašper Vrhovec

3 goals

- (Croatia) Franko Jelovčić
- (Italy) Sergio Romano
- (Portugal) Cardinal
- (Portugal) Joel Queirós
- (Portugal) Ricardinho
- (Russia) Robinho
- (Russia) Sergei Sergeev
- (Spain) Aicardo
- (Spain) Sergio Lozano
- (Spain) Pola
- (Spain) Rafa Usín

2 goals

- (Azerbaijan) Rafael
- (Croatia) Matija Capar
- (Czech Republic) Michal Belej
- (Portugal) Gonçalo Alves
- (Portugal) Bruno Coelho
- (Russia) Cirilo
- (Russia) Dmitri Lyskov
- (Slovenia) Kristjan Čujec
- (Spain) Raúl Campos
- (Spain) Lin
- (Spain) Miguelín
- (Spain) José Ruiz

1 goal

- (Azerbaijan) Amadeu
- (Azerbaijan) Augusto
- (Azerbaijan) Vitaliy Borisov
- (Azerbaijan) Edu
- (Azerbaijan) Felipe
- (Belgium) Omar Rahou
- (Croatia) Saša Babić
- (Croatia) Dario Marinović
- (Czech Republic) Roman Mareš
- (Czech Republic) Jiří Novotný
- (Italy) Saad Assis
- (Italy) Daniel Giasson
- (Italy) Humberto Honorio
- (Italy) Stefano Mammarella
- (Italy) Michele Miarelli
- (Italy) Murilo
- (Italy) Vampeta
- (Netherlands) Mohamed Attaibi
- (Portugal) Pedro Cary
- (Portugal) Pedro Costa
- (Portugal) João Matos
- (Portugal) Arnaldo Pereira
- (Romania) Vlad Iancu
- (Romania) Robert Lupu
- (Romania) Florin Matei
- (Romania) Emil Răducu
- (Russia) Aleksandr Fukin
- (Russia) Nikolai Pereverzev
- (Russia) Vladislav Shayakhmetov
- (Slovenia) Alen Fetić
- (Slovenia) Uroš Kroflič
- (Slovenia) Igor Osredkar
- (Spain) Ortiz
- (Ukraine) Dmytro Sorokin
- (Ukraine) Yevgen Valenko
- (Romania) Marian Șotărcă
- (Russia) Sergei Abramov

1 own goal

- (Belgium) Saad Salhi (against Romania)
- (Russia) Aleksandr Fukin (against Portugal)
