= Sandro Barradas =

Portuguese futsal player

Personal information
- Full name: Sandro Emanuel Anjos Barradas
- Date of birth: 29 June 1979 (age 47)
- Place of birth: Porto, Portugal
- Height: 1.80 m (5 ft 11 in)
- Position: Goalkeeper

Team information
- Current team: Rio Ave
- Number: 12

Youth career
- 1989–1990: Padroense (football)
- 1990–1994: Leixões (football)
- 1994–1998: Candal (football)

Senior career*
Years	Team	Apps	(Gls)
1998–2000	Gaia		
2000–2001	Boavista		
2001–2003	Miramar		
2003–2006	Freixieiro		
2006–2015	Modicus Sandim		
2015–2019	Unidos Pinheirense		
2019–	Rio Ave		

International career^{‡}
2000	Portugal U21	2	(0)
2001	Portugal U23	2	(0)
2003–2005	Portugal	24	(0)
- * Club domestic league appearances and goals as of 00:00, 14 May 2019 (UTC) ‡ National team caps and goals as of 00:00, 14 May 2019 (UTC)

Sandro Emanuel Anjos Barradas (born 29 June 1979) is a Portuguese futsal player who plays as a goalkeeper for Rio Ave. Sandro has been capped 24 times for the Portugal national team.
