= Paulinho Rocha =

Portuguese futsal player

Personal information
- Full name: Paulo Alexandre Faria Rocha
- Date of birth: 26 January 1990 (age 36)
- Place of birth: Portugal
- Height: 1.76 m (5 ft 9 in)
- Position: Universal

Team information
- Current team: Portimonense
- Number: 15

Youth career
- 1998–2009: Freixieiro

Senior career*
Years	Team	Apps	(Gls)
2006–2011	Freixieiro		
2012	KPRF Moskva		
2013	Freixieiro		
2013–2014	Benfica		
2015	Unidos Pinheirense		
2015	Braga/AAUM		
2016–2018	Unidos Pinheirense		
2018	FS Gelko Hasselt		
2018–2019	AD Fundão		
2019	Unidos Pinheirense		
2019	Amicale Clervaux		
2019–	Portimonense		

International career^{‡}
2011	Portugal	6	(0)
- * Club domestic league appearances and goals as of 00:00, 12 October 2018 (UTC) ‡ National team caps and goals as of 00:00, 12 October 2018 (UTC)

Paulo Alexandre Faria Rocha (born 26 January 1990), known as Paulinho Rocha, is a Portuguese futsal player who is a universal player for Portimonense and the Portugal national team.
