= Tiago Brito (futsal player) =

Portuguese futsal player

Tiago Brito ComIH ComM
Personal information
- Full name: Tiago Filipe Alves Brito
- Date of birth: 22 July 1991 (age 35)
- Place of birth: Matosinhos, Portugal
- Height: 1.71 m (5 ft 7 in)
- Position: Winger

Team information
- Current team: Braga/AAUM
- Number: 6

Youth career
- 1999–2010: Freixieiro

Senior career*
| Years | Team | Apps | (Gls) |
| 2009–2012 | Freixieiro | | |
| 2012–2013 | Novaya Generatsiya | | (6) |
| 2013–2017 | Braga/AAUM | 65 | (47) |
| 2017–2021 | Benfica | 54 | (25) |
| 2021– | Braga/AAUM | 4 | (2) |

International career^{‡}
| 2012 | Portugal U21 | 5 | (2) |
| 2014– | Portugal | 96 | (25) |
Medal record
Men's futsal
Representing Portugal
UEFA Futsal Championship
| Runner-up | 2026 Latvia / Lithuania / Slovenia |
- * Club domestic league appearances and goals as of 3 November 2021 ‡ National team caps and goals as of 3 November 2021

Tiago Filipe Alves Brito ComIH ComM (born 22 July 1991) is a Portuguese futsal player who plays as a winger for Braga/AAUM

== Honours ==
Benfica

- Campeonato Nacional: 2018–19
- Taça da Liga: 2017–18, 2018–19, 2019–20

Portugal

- UEFA Futsal Championship: 2018, 2022
- FIFA Futsal World Cup: 2021
- Futsal Finalissima: 2022

=== Orders ===
- Commander of the Order of Prince Henry
- Commander of the Order of Merit
