= Israel Alves =

Portuguese futsal player (b. 1977)

Personal information
- Full name: Israel Fernando da Costa Alves
- Date of birth: 31 January 1977 (age 49)
- Place of birth: Porto, Portugal
- Height: 1.70 m (5 ft 7 in)
- Position: Winger

Team information
- Current team: Futsal Azeméis
- Number: 24

Senior career*
| Years | Team | Apps | (Gls) |
| 1995–1996 | Fonte da Moura (football) | | |
| 1997–1998 | Boavista | | |
| 1998–2001 | Joarte | | |
| 2001–2002 | Miramar | | |
| 2002–2003 | Boavista | | |
| 2003–2005 | Sporting CP | 67 | (53) |
| 2005–2008 | Freixieiro | | |
| 2009 | Burela | | |
| 2009–2010 | FS Zamora | | |
| 2010 | Belenenses | | |
| 2010–2012 | Modicus Sandim | | |
| 2012 | Zhuhai Ming Shi | | |
| 2012–2014 | Rio Ave | | |
| 2014 | Boavista | 17 | (13) |
| 2015–2017 | Unidos Pinheirense | 26 | (35) |
| 2017– | Futsal Azeméis | 57 | (24) |

International career^{‡}
| 2001 | Portugal U23 | 2 | (0) |
| 2002 | Portugal B | 1 | (2) |
| 1999–2010 | Portugal | 104 | (60) |
- * Club domestic league appearances and goals as of 00:00, 3 October 2018 (UTC) ‡ National team caps and goals as of 00:00, 3 October 2018 (UTC)

Israel Fernando da Costa Alves (born 31 January 1977), is a Portuguese professional futsal player who plays as a winger for Futsal Azeméis. Israel earned over 100 caps for the Portugal national team and competed in two FIFA Futsal World Cups, in 2004 and 2008, and in three UEFA Futsal Championships, in 2005, 2007, and 2010. At club level in his long career as a futsal player he became Portuguese champion playing for Sporting CP in the 2003–04 season and he also played in the Spanish División de Honor de Futsal for FS Zamora and in China for Zhuhai Ming Shi.
