= Ricardo Fernandes (futsal player) =

Portuguese futsal player

Personal information
- Full name: Ricardo Nuno Pinto Fernandes
- Date of birth: 20 February 1986 (age 40)
- Place of birth: Padrão da Légua, Portugal
- Height: 1.71 m (5 ft 7 in)
- Position: Winger

Team information
- Current team: Póvoa Futsal
- Number: 3

Youth career
- 1995–1996: Senhora da Hora (football)
- 1996–1998: Águias Areosa (football)
- 2000–2001: Leixões (football)
- 2001–2003: CCSS Guifões
- 2003–2005: Freixieiro

Senior career*
| Years | Team | Apps | (Gls) |
| 2005–2013 | Freixieiro | | |
| 2013–2014 | Benfica | 20 | (16) |
| 2014–2015 | Modicus Sandim | 27 | (17) |
| 2015–2016 | Gualtar | 26 | (6) |
| 2016–2017 | Póvoa Futsal | 21 | (9) |
| 2017–2019 | Unidos Pinheirense | 48 | (15) |
| 2019– | Póvoa Futsal | 25 | (17) |

International career^{‡}
| 2009–2014 | Portugal | 42 | (9) |
- * Club domestic league appearances and goals as of 22:00, 16 February 2021 (UTC) ‡ National team caps and goals as of 22:00, 16 February 2021 (UTC)

Ricardo Nuno Pinto Fernandes (born 20 February 1986) is a Portuguese futsal player who plays as a winger for Póvoa Futsal and the Portugal national team.
