= André Correia (futsal player) =

Portuguese futsal player (born 1998)

Personal information
- Full name: André Filipe Quintão Correia
- Date of birth: 17 February 1998 (age 28)
- Place of birth: Lisbon, Portugal
- Height: 1.74 m (5 ft 9 in)
- Position: Goalkeeper

Senior career*
Years	Team	Apps	(Gls)
2016–2020	Benfica		
2020–2022	Eléctrico		
2021	→Benfica (loan)		
2022–2024	Leões de Porto Salvo		
2024–	Benfica		

International career
2022–	Portugal		
- * Club domestic league appearances and goals as of 24 September 2024

André Filipe Quintão Correia (born 17 February 1998) is a Portuguese professional futsal player who plays as a goalkeeper for Benfica and the Portuguese national team.

== Club career ==
In 2016, Correia was called up to the senior Benfica squad. During his first stint with the team, he won the league title in the 2018–19 season and the Taça da Liga in 2018, 2019 and 2020. On 25 February 2021, Correia was loaned to Benfica for the remainder of the season. On 17 July 2024, Benfica announced that they had signed Correia.

== International career ==
Correia was called up to the senior Portuguese national team for the first time on 5 October 2022. He was announced as being part of the senior Portuguese national team for the FIFA Futsal World Cup on 5 September 2024.

== Honours ==
Benfica

- Liga Portuguesa: 2018–19, 2024–25, 2025–26
- Taça de Portugal: 2016–17, 2025–26
- Taça da Liga: 2017–18, 2018–19, 2019–2020, 2025–26
- Supertaça: 2016
