= André Lima (futsal player) =

Portuguese futsal player and coach

Personal information
- Full name: José André Soares Lima
- Date of birth: 10 May 1971 (age 55)
- Place of birth: Porto, Portugal
- Height: 1.68 m (5 ft 6 in)
- Position: Winger

Team information
- Current team: Guangzhou Lixun (coach)

Youth career
- 1986–1989: Gondomar

Senior career*
Years	Team	Apps	(Gls)
1989–1995	Gondomar		
1995–1998	Miramar		
1998–1999	Caja Segovia		
1999–2002	Miramar		
2002–2008	Benfica		

International career
1997–2007	Portugal	111	(107)

Managerial career
- 2008–2010: Benfica
- 2011–2012: Gu Gugang
- 2012: China
- 2014–: Guangzhou Lixun
- * Club domestic league appearances and goals

José André Soares Lima (born 10 May 1971), known as André Lima, is a Portuguese retired futsal player who played as a winger, and the current coach of Chinese club Guangzhou Lixun.

A late bloomer, his career spanned 13 seasons, being best known for his performances at Benfica, also playing for Portugal national team on more than 100 occasions.

== Career ==
Born in Porto, Lima started in football, arriving at Gondomar S.C. as an under-17, competing all the way until the first team, which he would represent in the Regional league, but also in the Terceira Divisão.

His first experience in futsal was in 1995, at age 24, when he received an invitation for a tryout at Miramar. Lima spent the first season in the reserve team, on the second division, bagging more than sixty goals. He was promoted to the first team and help the club win their first ever league title in 1996–97.

His performance granted a move to the competitive Spanish league, representing Caja Segovia FS for one year, winning the 1998–99 league, as well as Copa de España and a Supercopa. The 28-year-old then returned to Miramar for the next season, winning another league title. In July 2002, already in his thirties, Lima joined Benfica. Over the next six seasons, he won four league titles, three Taça de Portugal and three Supertaça de Portugal, receiving honors for league topscorer in 2002-03 and 2004–05, plus Best Player in the latter season. He retired in June 2008, as the club topscorer.

On 7 July 2008, Lima replaced Beto Aranha as head coach, making his debut as manager. He won the league and cup in his first season, and in his second, lead the club in their first European title, the 2009–10 UEFA Futsal Cup. Failing to conquer any more silverware, on 23 June 2010, Lima was replaced as head coach. He continued his coaching career in China, briefly directing their national team, and helping to develop futsal there, which included opening youth schools in the Guangdong province.

== Honours ==
=== As player ===
Miramar

- Liga Portuguesa: 1996–97, 1999–2000
- Taça de Portugal: 1997–98

Caja Segovia

- División de Honor: 1998–99
- Copa de España: 1998–99
- Supercopa de España: 1998

Benfica

- Liga Portuguesa: 2002–03, 2004–05, 2006–07, 2007–08
- Taça de Portugal: 2002–03, 2004–05, 2006–07
- Supertaça de Portugal: 2003, 2006, 2007

=== As coach ===
Benfica

- UEFA Futsal Cup: 2009–10
- Liga Portuguesa: 2008–09
- Taça de Portugal: 2008–09
- Supertaça de Portugal: 2009
