= Miguel Mota =

Portuguese futsal coach

Personal information
- Full name: Luís Miguel Fraga de Magalhães Mota
- Date of birth: 14 September 1974 (age 52)
- Place of birth: Porto, Portugal
- Height: 1.66 m (5 ft 5 in)
- Position: Winger

Youth career
- 1991–1993: Senhora da Hora (football)

Senior career*
| Years | Team | Apps | (Gls) |
| 1995–2002 | Miramar | | |
| 2002–2009 | Freixieiro | | |
| 2009–2013 | Bonfim FC | | |
| 2013–2014 | Vermoim | | |
| 2014–2015 | Bonfim FC | | |
| 2015–2016 | Pinheirense | | |

International career^{‡}
| 1997–2003 | Portugal | 44 | (6) |

Managerial career
- 2015–2017: Moradores da Granja
- 2017–2018: Estrelas Vasco da Gama
- 2018–: Freixieiro
- * Club domestic league appearances and goals as of 00:00, 18 October 2018 (UTC) ‡ National team caps and goals as of 00:00, 18 October 2018 (UTC)

Luís Miguel Fraga de Magalhães Mota (born 14 September 1974) is a Portuguese futsal coach and former futsal player who played as a winger. He is the head coach of the Portuguese II Divisão club Freixieiro. As a player Mota won two Portuguese futsal leagues with Miramar and played for the Portugal national team in the 1999 Euros and the 2000 World Cup.
