= Filipe Soares =

Filipe Soares may refer to:

- Filipe Soares (footballer, born 1994)
- Filipe Soares (footballer, born 1999)
- Filipe Soares (footballer, born 2000)
- Filipe Soares (politician) (born 1981), Brazilian politician
