= Henrique Costa =

Armenian futsal player

Personal information
- Full name: Henrique Costa da Silva
- Date of birth: 23 April 1995 (age 31)
- Place of birth: Brazil
- Height: 1.64 m (5 ft 5 in)
- Position: Winger

Team information
- Current team: AEK LARNACA
- Number: 5

Senior career*
Years	Team	Apps	(Gls)
2014	Santos		
2015–2016	Novo Vrijeme		
2016–2017	Crnica		
2017–2019	Armenia Travel		
2019	Portimonense		
2019–	FC Kingersheim		
2020-2021	Bethune Futsal		
2021-2023	AEK Larnaca		

International career
2019–	Armenia		
- * Club domestic league appearances and goals

Henrique Costa da Silva (born 23 April 1995) is a Brazilian-born Armenian futsal player who plays as a winger for FC Kingersheim after a short stint at Portimonense. Henrique Costa became an international for the Armenia national futsal team in 2019, participating in the european national team championship. Henrique Costa is currently playing for AEK Larnaca, in Cyprus. With the club AEK Larnaca, Henrique has already played two seasons and still has two more contractual years with the club until 2025.
