= Rui Pedro =

Rui Pedro is a given name. Notable people with the name include:

- Rui Duarte (footballer, born 1978) (born 1978), Portuguese footballer
- Rui Pedro (footballer, born 1988), Portuguese footballer
- Rui Pedro (footballer, born 1998), Portuguese footballer
- Rui Pedro (futsal player) (born 1993), Portuguese futsal player
- Rui Pedro Teixeira Mendonça (born 1987), missing boy
