= Miramar FC =

Portuguese futsal club

Miramar
- Full name: Miramar Futsal Clube
- Founded: 1 October 1991
- Dissolved: 2008
- Ground: Pavilhão Municipal de Gulpilhares
- Capacity: 2,000
- Final season; 2007–08: II Divisão Futsal; Series A: 14th

Miramar Futsal Clube was a Portuguese futsal club from Gulpilhares, Vila Nova de Gaia. Founded in 1991 the club won two Portuguese Futsal Leagues and competed on the last edition of the Futsal European Clubs Championship. The team was dissolved after the 2007–08 season.

== Club honours ==
=== National competitions ===
- Liga Portuguesa de Futsal (2): 1996–97, 1999–2000
- Taça de Portugal de Futsal: 1997–98
- Supertaça de Futsal: 2000
- AF Porto Taça Futsal - 2022/23

== Former players ==
- (Portugal) Israel Alves (2001–02)
- (Portugal) Sandro Barradas (2001–03)
- (Portugal) (Brazil) Ivan Dias (1996–2002)
- (Portugal) Pedro Ferreira (1995–99)
- (Portugal) Carlos França (1995–98)
- (Portugal) João Leite (1994–2001)
- (Portugal) André Lima (1995–98 and 1999–2002)
- (Portugal) João Lopes (1995–98)
- (Portugal) Luís Miguel (1996–99)
- (Portugal) (Brazil) Gil Marques (1994–98)
- (Portugal) Toni Martins (1994–2002)
- (Portugal) Miguel Mota (1995–2002)
- (Portugal) Jorge Pires (1995–2003)
- (Portugal) Ricardinho (2001–03)
- (Portugal) João Rodrigues (1997–98)
- (Portugal) (Brazil) Sérgio Júnior (1999–2002)
