= Paulinho (futsal player) =

Portuguese futsal player

Personal information
- Full name: Paulo Jorge Camões Martins
- Date of birth: 12 March 1983 (age 43)
- Place of birth: Barreiro, Portugal
- Height: 1.63 m (5 ft 4 in)
- Position: Winger

Team information
- Current team: Portimonense
- Number: 10

Youth career
- 1993–1998: Silves (football)
- 1998–2002: GEJUPCE

Senior career*
Years	Team	Apps	(Gls)
2002–2005	GEJUPCE		
2005–2007	JD Fontaínhas		
2007–2010	Belenenses		
2010–2017	Sporting CP	182	(76)
2017	Futsal Cisternino		
2017–2018	Real Rieti		
2018–2019	Leões Porto Salvo		
2019–	Portimonense		

International career^{‡}
2009–2016	Portugal	76	(13)
- * Club domestic league appearances and goals as of 23:00, 21 January 2018 (UTC) ‡ National team caps and goals as of 23:00, 21 January 2018 (UTC)

Paulo Jorge Camões Martins (born 12 March 1983), known as Paulinho, is a Portuguese futsal player who plays for Portimonense and the Portugal national team.
