= Diece =

Brazilian futsal player

Personal information
- Full name: Francisco Diece de Oliveira Pereira
- Date of birth: 17 June 1986 (age 40)
- Place of birth: Fortaleza, Brazil
- Position: Winger

Team information
- Current team: Svarog FC Teplice
- Number: 5

Senior career*
Years	Team	Apps	(Gls)
2007–2010	Minas Tênis Clube		
2010–2013	Benfica		
2013–2014	Intelli		
2015	Clube Atlético Deportivo		
2016-2017	Carlos Barbosa		
2018	Copagril Futsal		
2018	Minas Tênis Clube		
2018-2019	Al-Arabi SC		
2019-2021	MVFC Berettyóújfalu		
2021-	Svarog FC Teplice		

International career
¿?–	Brazil	4	
- * Club domestic league appearances and goals

Francisco Diece de Oliveira Pereira (born 17 June 1986), commonly known as Diece, is a Brazilian futsal player who plays for Svarog FC Teplice as a winger.

== Career ==
Born in Fortaleza, Diece's career started in Minas Tênis Clube, where he won three Minas Gerais State Championship, plus three Belo Horizonte Metropolitan Championship.

On 4 August 2010, Diece made his first move abroad, joining Benfica in a three-year deal, as the Portuguese club sought a replacement for Ricardinho. Over the course of his contract, he helped the Lisbon-side win a league and cup double in 2011–12, plus two supercups, returning to Brazil in July 2013, as a free player, to play for Intelli.

In the Orlândia team, he won his first league title in Brazil, and his first continental title, the 2013 Copa de Libertadores. He left Intelli in December 2014 and moved to Clube Atlético Deportivo in Guarapuava, helping them finish eight and qualify for the second phase. After a year there, he signed with Carlos Barbosa, who had just won the 2015 Liga Futsal against his former team, Intelli.

== Honours ==
Benfica

- Liga Portuguesa: 2011–12
- Taça de Portugal: 2011–12
- Supertaça de Portugal: 2011, 2012

Intelli

- Copa Libertadores de Futsal: 2013
- Liga Futsal: 2013
