= Cristiano Parreiro =

Portuguese futsal player

Personal information
- Full name: Cristiano Galvão Parreiro
- Date of birth: 20 August 1979 (age 47)
- Place of birth: Neuss, West Germany
- Height: 1.71 m (5 ft 7 in)
- Position: Goalkeeper

Team information
- Current team: Futsal Azeméis
- Number: 19

Youth career
- 1988–1991: FC Alverca (football)
- 1995–1998: Núcleo de Chasa

Senior career*
Years	Team	Apps	(Gls)
2000–2003	Forte da Casa		
2003–2015	Sporting CP	295	(14)
2005–2006	→ Belenenses (loan)		
2015–2016	SL Olivais	32	(1)
2016–	Futsal Azeméis	43	(1)

International career^{‡}
2007–2017	Portugal	51	(0)
- * Club domestic league appearances and goals as of 00:00, 29 September 2018 (UTC) ‡ National team caps and goals as of 00:00, 29 September 2018 (UTC)

Cristiano Galvão Parreiro (born 20 August 1979), commonly known as Cristiano, is a Portuguese professional futsal player who plays as a goalkeeper for Futsal Azeméis. He competed at the UEFA Futsal Euro 2014 for the Portugal national team. At club level he started his career playing for Forte da Casa and also played for Sporting CP for over a decade, with shorter stints at Belenenses, SL Olivais and Futsal Azeméis.
