= Ivan Dias (futsal) =

Brazilian futsal player

Personal information
- Full name: Ivan Almeida Dias
- Date of birth: 28 August 1972 (age 54)
- Place of birth: Niterói, Brazil
- Height: 1.79 m (5 ft 10 in)
- Position: Defender

Senior career*
Years	Team	Apps	(Gls)
1996–2002	Miramar		
2002–2010	Freixieiro		
2010–2011	Académica		
2011–2015	Boavista		

International career^{‡}
2000–2008	Portugal	106	(46)
- * Club domestic league appearances and goals ‡ National team caps and goals as of 00:00, 7 October 2018 (UTC)

Ivan Almeida Dias (born 28 August 1972), is a retired Brazilian born Portuguese futsal player who played as a defender for Miramar, Freixieiro, Académica, Boavista and the Portugal national team.
