= 2008–09 Campeonato Nacional da 1ª Divisão de Futsal =

2008–09 Portuguese Futsal First Division

Portuguese Futsal First Division
- Season: 2008–09
- Champions: Benfica (5th title)

The 2008–09 season of the Portuguese Futsal First Division was the 19th season of top-tier futsal in Portugal and it was won by Benfica.

== Teams ==
- CF Belenenses
- FJ Antunes
- Benfica
- AR Freixieiro
- AD Fundão
- Instituto D. João V
- SL Olivais
- Sporting CP
- FC Alpendorada
- Modicus - Sandim
- Academico Mogadouro
- CF Sassoeiros
- Odivelas
- Nucleo Sportinguista de Tires

== League table ==
P	Team	Pts	Pld	W	D	L	GF	GA	GD	Qualification or relegation
1	Benfica	56	26	17	5	4	108	56	+52	Title Play-off
2	Fundação Jorge Antunes	56	26	17	5	4	92	53	+39	Title Play-off
3	Belenenses	54	26	17	3	6	100	63	+37	Title Play-off
4	Freixieiro	53	26	16	5	5	112	60	+52	Title Play-off
5	Sporting CP	52	26	15	7	4	97	74	+23	Title Play-off
6	Alpendorada	39	26	10	9	7	92	74	+18	Title Play-off
7	Fundão	36	26	10	6	10	66	72	-6	Title Play-off
8	Instituto D. João V	36	26	10	6	10	70	82	-12	Title Play-off
9	Modicus - Sandim	34	26	9	7	10	67	81	-14	
10	SL Olivais	27	26	6	9	11	71	83	-12	
11	Mogadouro	23	26	5	8	13	85	98	-13	
12	Sassoeiros	20	26	6	2	18	67	108	-41	
13	Odivelas FC	11	26	3	2	21	68	124	-56	Relegation
14	Nucleo S. Tires	11	26	3	2	21	48	115	-67	Relegation

== Title Playoffs ==
=== Quarterfinals ===
1st Matches 16/5/2009 Sporting C.P. - A.R. Freixieiro 4-3 (1-1) F.C. Alpendorada - C.F. Belenenses 4-7 (1-2) AD Fundão - Fundação Jorge Antunes 5-1 (2-0) Instituto D. João V - S.L. Benfica 1-4 (1-3)

2nd Matches 23/5/2009 A.R. Freixieiro - Sporting C.P. 7-6 (0-1) C.F. Belenenses - F.C. Alpendorada 5-2 (1-1) Fundação Jorge Antunes - AD Fundão 6-4 (3-1) S.L. Benfica - Instituto D. João V 4-2 (3-1)

3rd Matches - If necessary 24/5/2009 A.R. Freixieiro - Sporting C.P. 4-3 (3-0) Fundação Jorge Antunes - AD Fundão 5-3 (2-3)

=== Semifinals ===
1st Matches 6/6/2009 A.R. Freixieiro - S.L. Benfica 9-10 ap; 4-4 (4-2) C.F. Belenenses - Fundação Jorge Antunes 7-4 a2ndet; 4-4 a1stet; 3-3 (2-0)

2nd Matches 13/6/2009 S.L. Benfica - A.R. Freixieiro 4-3 (2-2) Fundação Jorge Antunes - C.F. Belenenses 3-2 a2ndet; 2-2 a1stet; 2-2 (1-1)

3rd Matches - If necessary 14/6/2009 Fundação Jorge Antunes - C.F. Belenenses 3-4 (1-2)

=== Final ===
- 1st Match

20/6/2009 S.L. Benfica - C.F. Belenenses 6-2 (1-0)

- 2nd Match

21/6/2009 S.L. Benfica - C.F. Belenenses 2-3 (1-1)

- 3rd Match

27/6/2009 C.F. Belenenses - S.L. Benfica 3-2 (3-1)

- 4th Match - If necessary

28/6/2009 C.F. Belenenses - S.L. Benfica 3-6 (3-3)

- 5th Match - If necessary

30/6/2009 S.L. Benfica - C.F. Belenenses 4-3 a.2nd.e.t (3-2 a.1st.e.t;2-2;2-0)

  - Portuguese Futsal Play-Off 2008/2009 Winner: Benfica
