= Rui Pedro (futsal player) =

Brazilian futsal player

Personal information
- Full name: Rui Pedro Teixeira Cardoso
- Date of birth: 31 December 1993 (age 32)
- Place of birth: Porto, Portugal
- Height: 1.83 m (6 ft 0 in)
- Position: Goalkeeper

Team information
- Current team: Modicus Sandim
- Number: 1

Youth career
- 2004–2005: Fonte da Moura
- 2007–2008: Portuguesa Aldoar
- 2008–2010: Fonte da Moura
- 2010–2012: Boavista

Senior career*
Years	Team	Apps	(Gls)
2012–2016	Boavista		
2016–	Modicus Sandim		

International career^{‡}
2019–	Portugal	2	(0)
- * Club domestic league appearances and goals as of 00:00, 13 August 2019 (UTC) ‡ National team caps and goals as of 00:00, 13 August 2019 (UTC)

Rui Pedro Teixeira Cardoso (born 31 December 1993) is a Portuguese futsal player who plays as a goalkeeper for Modicus Sandim and the Portuguese national futsal team.
