= F.C. Alpendorada =

Portuguese football club

Alpendorada
- Full name: Futebol Clube de Alpendorada
- Founded: 1960
- Ground: Estádio Municipal de Alpendorada; Alpendorada; Marco de Canaveses; Portugal
- Capacity: 15,000
- Chairman: Antonio Oliveira Pereira
- League: Campeonato de Portugal
- 2021–22: Portuguese District Championships, promoted
Home colours

Futebol Clube de Alpendorada (abbreviated as FC Alpendorada) is a Portuguese football club based in Alpendorada, Marco de Canaveses in the district of Porto.

== Background ==
FC Alpendorada currently plays in the Campeonato de Portugal which is the fourth tier of Portuguese football. The club was founded in 1960 and they play their home matches at the Estádio Municipal de Alpendorada in Alpendurada e Matos, Marco de Canaveses. The stadium is able to accommodate 15,000 spectators.

The club is affiliated to Associação de Futebol do Porto and has competed in the AF Porto Taça. The club has also entered the national cup competition known as Taça de Portugal on occasions.

== Season to season ==
Season	Level	Division	Section	Place	Movements
1990–91	Tier 5	Distritais	AF Porto – 1ª Divisão 2		
1991–92	Tier 5	Distritais	AF Porto – 1ª Divisão 2		
1992–93	Tier 5	Distritais	AF Porto – Honra		
1993–94	Tier 5	Distritais	AF Porto – Honra		
1994–95	Tier 5	Distritais	AF Porto – Honra		
1995–96	Tier 5	Distritais	AF Porto – Honra		Promoted
1996–97	Tier 4	Terceira Divisão	Série B	10th	
1997–98	Tier 4	Terceira Divisão	Série B	15th	Relegated
1998–99	Tier 5	Distritais	AF Porto – Honra	4th	
1999–2000	Tier 5	Distritais	AF Porto – Honra		
2000–01	Tier 5	Distritais	AF Porto – Honra	12th	
2001–02	Tier 5	Distritais	AF Porto – Honra	9th	
2002–03	Tier 5	Distritais	AF Porto – Honra	12th	
2003–04	Tier 5	Distritais	AF Porto – Honra	11th	
2004–05	Tier 5	Distritais	AF Porto – 1ª Divisão	16th	Relegated
2005–06	Tier 6	Distritais	AF Porto – 1ª Divisão 1		Promoted
2006–07	Tier 5	Distritais	AF Porto – Honra	10th	
2007–08	Tier 5	Distritais	AF Porto – Honra	2nd	Promoted
2008–09	Tier 4	Terceira Divisão	Série B – 1ª Fase	12th	Relegation Group
	Tier 4	Terceira Divisão	Série B – Sub-Série B2	3rd	Relegated
2009–10	Tier 5	Distritais	AF Porto – Honra	2nd	Promoted
2010–11	Tier 4	Terceira Divisão	Série C – 1ª Fase	5th	Promotion Group
	Tier 4	Terceira Divisão	Série C Fase Final	5th	
2011–12	Tier 4	Terceira Divisão	Série B – 1ª Fase	11th	Relegation Group
	Tier 4	Terceira Divisão	Série B Fase Últimos	6th	Relegated

== League and Cup history ==
Season		Pos.	Pl.	W	D	L	GS	GA	P	Portuguese Cup	Notes
2006–07	AF Porto – Honra	10	34	11	13	10	37	36	46	none	
2007–08	AF Porto – Honra	2	34	21	8	5	67	36	71	none	

== Futsal ==
The club has run a successful futsal team which competed in the Portuguese Futsal First Division and reached the championship play-off stages in 2004–05, 2006–07, 2007–08, 2008–09 and 2009–10. They were relegated from the top flight at the end of the 2010–11 season.
