= Ricardinho (futsal player, born 1985) =

Portuguese futsal player (born 1985)

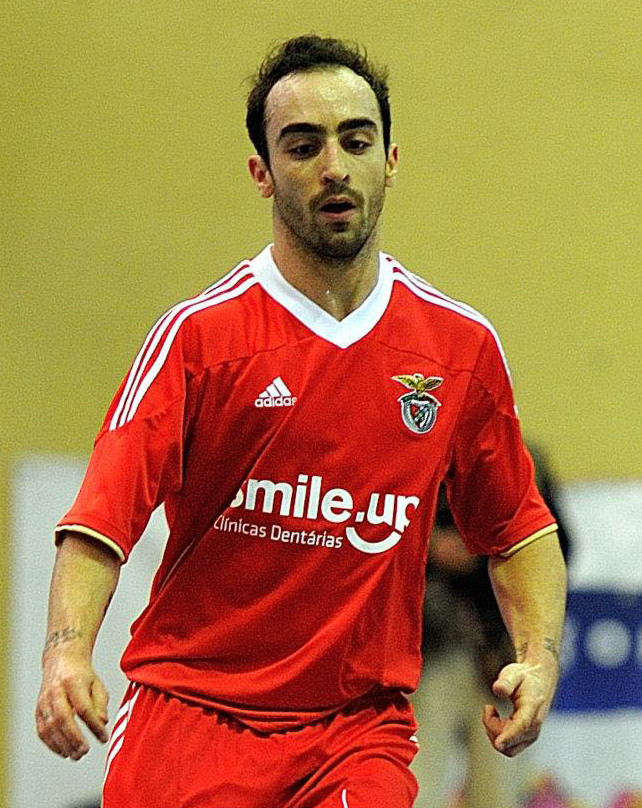
- Ricardinho playing for Benfica in 2012

Personal information
- Full name: Ricardo Filipe da Silva Braga
- Date of birth: 3 September 1985 (age 41)
- Place of birth: Valbom, Portugal
- Height: 1.65 m (5 ft 5 in)
- Position: Winger

Team information
- Current team: Riga Futsal Club
- Number: 10

Youth career
- –2002: Gramidense
- Miramar

Senior career*
Years	Team	Apps	(Gls)
2003–2010	Benfica	98	(195)
2010–2013	Nagoya Oceans		
2011	→ CSKA Moscow (loan)	8	(2)
2011–2012	→ Benfica (loan)	4	(1)
2013–2020	Inter Movistar	210	(152)
2020–2022	ACCS	8	(5)
2022–2023	Pendekar United	8	(5)
2023–2024	Riga Futsal Club		
2024–	Ecocity Genzano		

International career^{‡}
2003–2021	Portugal	188	(142)
- * Club domestic league appearances and goals ‡ National team caps and goals as of 3 April 2019

Ricardo Filipe da Silva Braga ComIH ComM (born 3 September 1985), best known as Ricardinho, is a Portuguese professional futsal player who plays for Latvian club Riga Futsal Club. He is regarded by many as one of the best futsal players of all time, winning numerous titles and accolades for both club and country, such as the UEFA Futsal Champions League, UEFA European Futsal Championship, FIFA Futsal World Cup, the Best Player of the World awards, and many more. He operates mainly as a flank/winger, and commonly wears his iconic number "10".

Nicknamed O Mágico (The Magician), he was named Best Player of the World a record six times by Futsal Planet, 5 of which he won consecutively from 2014 to 2018 a record as well. He won his first in 2010. Ricardinho is the only player to have won the award more than four times.

In 2020 he was awarded a spot in the FutsalFeed's Best Team of the Year Award, the first time this award was conceived.

At international club level, Ricardinho has won the UEFA Futsal Cup, now known as the UEFA Futsal Champions League, thrice, in 2009–10 with Benfica and in 2016–17 and 2017–18 with Inter FS. As a teenager he had already played and lost a final in 2003–04, for Benfica, against Boomerang Interviú. He also lost another final, while at Inter FS, in 2015–16, against Gazprom-Ugra. In European competitions with his country, he won the UEFA Futsal Euro 2018, in which he finished as top scorer and received the award for Best Player. He had already been named the Best Player in the 2007 edition and been joint-top scorer in the 2016 edition. He is now the all-time top scorer of the competition.

In 2021, right after his last FIFA Futsal World Cup match, Ricardinho was awarded with the Golden Ball for the best player throughout the tournament, adding another individual achievement to his World Cup Golden Shoe award for top scorer that he had been awarded with the previous edition in 2016. This distinction was strongly associated with his contributions to help Portugal win the 2021 World Cup. Ricardinho captained his Portuguese national team to the first two of their back-to-back-to-back international trophies during the late 2010s and early 2020s, the country's first major honors: the UEFA Futsal Euro 2018 and the 2021 FIFA Futsal World Cup.

== Style of play ==
Ricardinho is lauded for his defensive quality, in addition to his offensive prowess. He has been regarded by some experts as the greatest futsal player of all time.

== Honours ==
=== Club ===
Benfica

- Liga Portuguesa: 2004–05, 2006–07, 2007–08, 2008–09, 2011–12
- Taça de Portugal: 2004–05, 2006–07, 2008–09, 2011–12
- Supertaça de Portugal: 2006, 2007, 2009
- UEFA Futsal Cup: 2009–10

Nagoya Oceans

- F. League: 2010–11, 2012–13
- F. League Ocean Cup: 2010, 2012

Inter Movistar

- Primera División: 2013–14, 2014–15, 2015–16, 2016–17, 2017–18, 2019–20
- Copa de España: 2014, 2016, 2017
- Copa del Rey: 2014–15
- Supercopa de España: 2015, 2017, 2018
- UEFA Futsal Cup: 2016–17, 2017–18

ACCS Asnières Villeneuve 92

- Championnat de France de Futsal: 2020–21
- Championnat de France de Futsal Division 2: 2021–22

Riga Futsal Club

- Latvian Futsal Premier League: 2023–24

=== National team ===
Portugal

- Futsal Mundialito: 2007
- UEFA Futsal Championship: 2018
- FIFA Futsal World Cup: 2021

=== Individual ===
- Best Player of the World: 2010, 2014, 2015, 2016, 2017, 2018
- Liga Portuguesa Best Player: 2006–07
- Liga Portuguesa Top scorer: 2006–07 (49 goals)
- Liga Portuguesa Best Young Player: 2002–03
- F. League Best Player: 2010–11
- Primera División de Futsal Best Player: 2013–14, 2014–15
- Copa de España Best Player: 2014
- UEFA Futsal Championship Best Player: 2007, 2018
- UEFA Futsal Championship Top Scorer: 2016 (6 goals, shared), 2018 (7 goals)
- FIFA Futsal World Cup Best Player: 2021
- FIFA Futsal World Cup Golden Shoe: 2016
- FIFA Futsal World Cup Bronze Ball: 2012
- Best Team of the Year Winger: 2020

Orders

- Commander of the Order of Prince Henry
- Commander of the Order of Merit

== International goals ==
No.	Date	Venue	Opponent	Score	Result	Competition
1.	18 November 2007	Porto, Portugal	Czech Republic	1–1	5–3	2007 UEFA Futsal Championship
2.	21 November 2007	Porto, Portugal	Romania	1–0	3–0	2007 UEFA Futsal Championship
3.	21 November 2007	Porto, Portugal	Romania	2–0	3–0	2007 UEFA Futsal Championship
4.	23 November 2007	Porto, Portugal	Spain	2–1	2–2 (3–4 p)	2007 UEFA Futsal Championship
5.	4 October 2008	Rio de Janeiro, Brazil	Italy	1–3	1–3	2008 FIFA Futsal World Cup
6.	1 February 2012	Zagreb, Croatia	Italy	4–1	4–1	UEFA Futsal Euro 2012
7.	7 February 2012	Zagreb, Croatia	Azerbaijan	1–1	1–3	UEFA Futsal Euro 2012
8.	4 November 2012	Nakhon Ratchasima, Thailand	Japan	2–0	5–5	2012 FIFA Futsal World Cup
9.	4 November 2012	Nakhon Ratchasima, Thailand	Japan	5–1	5–5	2012 FIFA Futsal World Cup
10.	11 November 2012	Bangkok, Thailand	Paraguay	3–1	4–1	2012 FIFA Futsal World Cup
11.	11 November 2012	Bangkok, Thailand	Paraguay	4–1	4–1	2012 FIFA Futsal World Cup
12.	14 November 2012	Bangkok, Thailand	Italy	1–0	3–4 (a.e.t.)	2012 FIFA Futsal World Cup
13.	14 November 2012	Bangkok, Thailand	Italy	2–0	3–4 (a.e.t.)	2012 FIFA Futsal World Cup
14.	14 November 2012	Bangkok, Thailand	Italy	3–0	3–4 (a.e.t.)	2012 FIFA Futsal World Cup
15.	1 February 2014	Antwerp, Belgium	Russia	1–0	4–4	UEFA Futsal Euro 2014
16.	6 February 2014	Antwerp, Belgium	Italy	1–1	3–4	UEFA Futsal Euro 2014
17.	8 February 2014	Antwerp, Belgium	Spain	1–3	4–8	UEFA Futsal Euro 2014
18.	18 March 2015	Călărași, Romania	Georgia	3–0	7–0	UEFA Futsal Euro 2016 qualifying
19.	18 March 2015	Călărași, Romania	Georgia	5–0	7–0	UEFA Futsal Euro 2016 qualifying
20.	19 March 2015	Călărași, Romania	Kazakhstan	1–0	1–3	UEFA Futsal Euro 2016 qualifying
21.	21 March 2015	Călărași, Romania	Romania	2–0	4–1	UEFA Futsal Euro 2016 qualifying
22.	21 March 2015	Călărași, Romania	Romania	3–0	4–1	UEFA Futsal Euro 2016 qualifying
23.	10 December 2015	Póvoa de Varzim, Portugal	Poland	6–2	6–2	2016 FIFA Futsal World Cup qualification
24.	13 December 2015	Póvoa de Varzim, Portugal	Romania	2–0	5–0	2016 FIFA Futsal World Cup qualification
25.	13 December 2015	Póvoa de Varzim, Portugal	Romania	5–0	5–0	2016 FIFA Futsal World Cup qualification
26.	4 February 2016	Belgrade, Serbia	Slovenia	2–1	6–2	UEFA Futsal Euro 2016
27.	4 February 2016	Belgrade, Serbia	Slovenia	3–2	6–2	UEFA Futsal Euro 2016
28.	4 February 2016	Belgrade, Serbia	Slovenia	5–2	6–2	UEFA Futsal Euro 2016
29.	6 February 2016	Belgrade, Serbia	Serbia	1–1	1–3	UEFA Futsal Euro 2016
30.	8 February 2016	Belgrade, Serbia	Spain	1–3	2–6	UEFA Futsal Euro 2016
31.	8 February 2016	Belgrade, Serbia	Spain	2–4	2–6	UEFA Futsal Euro 2016
32.	13 September 2016	Cali, Colombia	Panama	1–0	9–0	2016 FIFA Futsal World Cup
33.	13 September 2016	Cali, Colombia	Panama	3–0	9–0	2016 FIFA Futsal World Cup
34.	13 September 2016	Cali, Colombia	Panama	5–0	9–0	2016 FIFA Futsal World Cup
35.	13 September 2016	Cali, Colombia	Panama	6–0	9–0	2016 FIFA Futsal World Cup
36.	13 September 2016	Cali, Colombia	Panama	7–0	9–0	2016 FIFA Futsal World Cup
37.	13 September 2016	Cali, Colombia	Panama	9–0	9–0	2016 FIFA Futsal World Cup
38.	16 September 2016	Medellín, Colombia	Uzbekistan	1–0	5–1	2016 FIFA Futsal World Cup
39.	16 September 2016	Medellín, Colombia	Uzbekistan	2–1	5–1	2016 FIFA Futsal World Cup
40.	16 September 2016	Medellín, Colombia	Uzbekistan	3–1	5–1	2016 FIFA Futsal World Cup
41.	21 September 2016	Cali, Colombia	Costa Rica	1–0	4–0	2016 FIFA Futsal World Cup
42.	21 September 2016	Cali, Colombia	Costa Rica	2–0	4–0	2016 FIFA Futsal World Cup
43.	25 September 2016	Cali, Colombia	Azerbaijan	3–1	3–2	2016 FIFA Futsal World Cup
44.	31 January 2018	Ljubljana, Slovenia	Romania	3–1	4–1	UEFA Futsal Euro 2018
45.	4 February 2018	Ljubljana, Slovenia	Ukraine	5–2	5–3	UEFA Futsal Euro 2018
46.	6 February 2018	Ljubljana, Slovenia	Azerbaijan	4–1	8–1	UEFA Futsal Euro 2018
47.	6 February 2018	Ljubljana, Slovenia	Azerbaijan	5–1	8–1	UEFA Futsal Euro 2018
48.	6 February 2018	Ljubljana, Slovenia	Azerbaijan	7–1	8–1	UEFA Futsal Euro 2018
49.	6 February 2018	Ljubljana, Slovenia	Azerbaijan	8–1	8–1	UEFA Futsal Euro 2018
50.	10 February 2018	Ljubljana, Slovenia	Spain	1–0	3–2 (a.e.t.)	UEFA Futsal Euro 2018
51.	27 October 2019	Viseu, Portugal	Czech Republic	2–1	4–1	2020 FIFA Futsal World Cup qualification
52.	27 October 2019	Viseu, Portugal	Czech Republic	4–1	4–1	2020 FIFA Futsal World Cup qualification
53.	2 February 2020	Póvoa de Varzim, Portugal	Italy	3–0	4–1	2020 FIFA Futsal World Cup qualification
54.	2 February 2020	Póvoa de Varzim, Portugal	Italy	4–0	4–1	2020 FIFA Futsal World Cup qualification
55.	16 September 2021	Kaunas, Lithuania	Solomon Islands	2–0	7–0	2021 FIFA Futsal World Cup
56.	24 September 2021	Kaunas, Lithuania	Serbia	1–0	4–3 (a.e.t.)	2021 FIFA Futsal World Cup
