= Arnaldo Pereira (futsal player) =

Portuguese futsal player

Personal information
- Full name: Arnaldo Augusto Rodrigues Pereira
- Date of birth: 16 June 1979 (age 47)
- Place of birth: Bragança, Portugal
- Height: 1.73 m (5 ft 8 in)
- Position: Winger

Team information
- Current team: Rio Ave
- Number: 16

Youth career
- 1994–1996: Mãe de Água (football)
- 1997–1998: Pioneiros de Bragança

Senior career*
Years	Team	Apps	(Gls)
1999–2001	Instituto D. João V		
2001–2002	Freixieiro		
2002–2004	Benfica		
2004–2007	Xota FS		
2007–2012	Benfica		
2012–2013	Nikars		
2013–2014	Baku United		
2014–2015	Nikars		
2015–2016	Latina		
2016–2017	Futsal Azeméis		
2017–2018	Petrarca		
2018	GD Viso		
2018–	Rio Ave		

International career^{‡}
1999–2000	Portugal U21	2	(5)
2001	Portugal U23	2	(2)
1999–2016	Portugal	208	(98)
- * Club domestic league appearances and goals ‡ National team caps and goals as of 00:00, 7 October 2018 (UTC)

Arnaldo Augusto Rodrigues Pereira (born 16 June 1979) is a Portuguese futsal player who plays for Rio Ave after a short stint at GD Viso as a winger. Arnaldo is the most capped player in the history of the Portugal national futsal team with 208 appearances.

== Honours ==
Freixieiro

- Liga Portuguesa de Futsal: 2001–02

Benfica

- Liga Portuguesa: 2002–03, 2004–05, 2007–08, 2008–09, 2011–12
- Taça de Portugal: 2002–03, 2004–05, 2008–09, 2011–12
- Supertaça de Portugal: 2003–04, 2007–08, 2009–10, 2011–12
- UEFA Futsal Cup: 2009–10

Nikars

- Latvian League: 2011–12, 2012–13
