= S.L. Benfica (futsal) =

Portuguese professional futsal team

Benfica
- Full name: Sport Lisboa e Benfica
- Nicknames: As Águias (The Eagles); Os Encarnados (The Reds)
- Founded: 13 September 2001 (25 years ago)
- Ground: Pavilhão Fidelidade
- Capacity: 2,400
- Chairman: Armindo Cordeiro
- Head coach: Cassiano Klein
- League: Liga Placard
- 2024–25: Overall table: 2nd Playoffs: Champions
- Website: slbenfica.pt
Home colours	Away colours	Third colours

Sport Lisboa e Benfica (Portuguese pronunciation: [sɨˈpɔɾ liʒˈβoɐ i βɐ̃jˈfikɐ]), commonly known as Benfica, is a professional futsal team based in Lisbon, Portugal, that plays in the Liga Portuguesa de Futsal, where they are the current champions.

Since its creation in 2001, the team has been a challenger for the domestic championship, and they won at least one trophy per season between 2005 and 2013. In 2006–07 and 2011–12, Benfica won all Portuguese competitions at the time (3). Benfica became the first Portuguese team to win the UEFA Futsal Champions League (then "UEFA Futsal Cup"), in 2010, and were ranked first in the competition's ranking two years later.

Benfica is the second-most decorated team in Portugal, with a total 34 trophies: 10 Portuguese League titles, 9 Portuguese Cups, 5 League Cups, 9 Super Cups, and 1 UEFA Futsal Champions League.

== History ==
=== Establishment (2001–2004) ===
Established on 13 September 2001, Benfica merged with futsal team Olímpico and became managed by company MPM on 2 June, with Benfica only providing the facilities, medical staff and kits. This union allowed Benfica to participate in the 2001–02 first division. In their debut, Benfica were runners-up, losing 3–2 to Miramar Futsal Clube with the decisive goal coming from a future Benfica glory, André Lima. Benfica's notable players in their first season were Portuguese internationals Naná, Vitinho I, Drula and Nelito, who were coached by Alípio Matos.

The following season, with new players such as André Lima, Rogério Vilela, Pedro Costa and Arnaldo Pereira, Benfica won their first league title, against Sporting CP, their first Taça de Portugal, and their first SuperTaça.

In 2003–04, notable players Ciço and Ricardinho joined Benfica. Benfica reached the 2003–04 UEFA Futsal Cup final, losing 7–5 on aggregate to Interviu.

=== Adil Amarante years (2004–2008) ===
In 2004–05, Adil Amarante replaced Alípio Matos and added Nelito, Estrela and Pica Pau. Benfica won the Portuguese Cup against Boavista FC and the second league title against Sporting.

The next season, players such as Wilson, Côco and Sidnei joined Benfica, while Miguel Almeida and Zé Maria left. Benfica lost the Portuguese Cup to Sporting in the Final Four, and then the league.

In 2006–07, Benfica improved their squad with new players such as Gonçalo Alves, Bebé, Pedro Costa, Zé Maria and Estrela, who returned. Nelito ended his career. Benfica conquered the Super Cup. In May Benfica won another Portuguese Cup and by June another league

In the 2007–08 season, Arnaldo Pereira and Miguel Almeida returned, while Estrela left. Benfica started the season by winning the Super Cup. In January, César Paulo joined Benfica. In March, Adil Amarante left in disagreement with Benfica about his new contract, and was replaced by Beto Aranha, who lead Benfica to their first back-to-back champion titles.

=== André Lima years (2008–2010) ===
In July 2008, despite being in charge only for four months, Benfica replaced Beto Aranha with former player and coach, André Lima. The only reinforcement was Pedrinho, while Miguel Almeida left. Benfica lost the Super Cup but won the Portuguese Cup, and the third league title in a row for the first time.

In 2009–10, Benfica hired Davi and Marinho, and went on winning their 13th title, the domestic Super Cup.

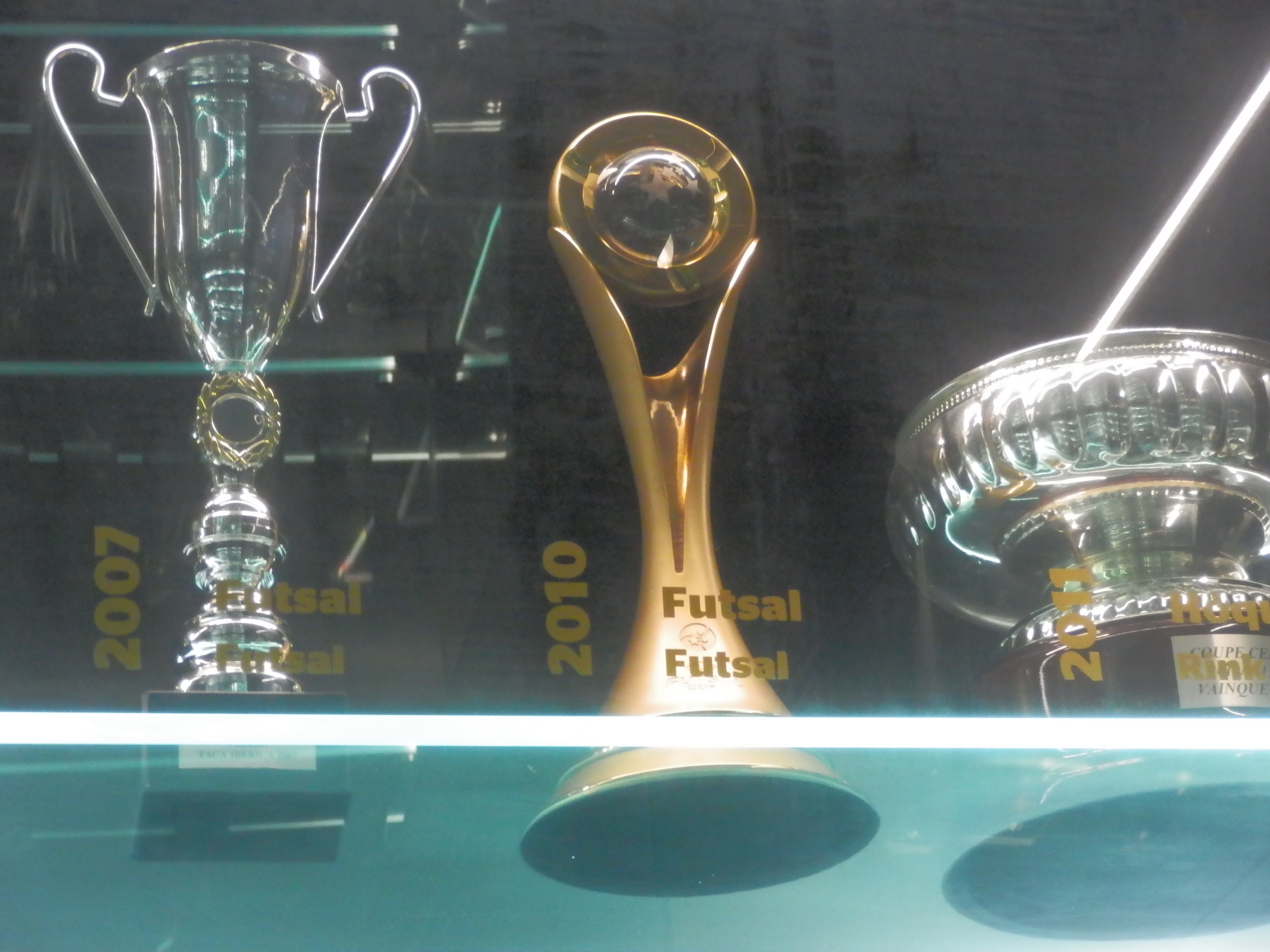
2009–10 UEFA Futsal Cup trophy (centre) on display at Museu Benfica

On 25 April 2010, Benfica became European champions by conquering the UEFA Futsal Cup, after defeating Luparense by 8–4 in the semi-finals, they beat Interviu 3–2 in the final; Benfica conceded first by Marquinho, but Joel Queirós and then Arnaldo put Benfica in the lead, Interviu equalised by Betão, but Davi in the final minutes sealed the historic victory.

In the remainder of the season, Benfica lost the Portuguese Cup to Belenenses and then the league to Sporting.

=== 2010–present ===
In the 2010–11 season, coach Paulo Fernandes, who had just won the league for Sporting, replaced European champion André Lima. Ricardinho left and was replaced by Diece. Another addition was Diego Sol who arrived from Belenenses, and Teka from Sporting. In this season Benfica lost the Portuguese Cup, and then the league in three matches, despite winning the regular phase. In European competitions, Benfica finished fourth in the 2010–11 UEFA Futsal Cup.

In 2011–12, Benfica added Marcão, Dentinho and Bruno Coelho. The season was better than the previous one as Benfica won all three competitions they entered: the Super Cup, Portuguese Cup and the league. Ricardinho returned in January on a 6 month-loan but failed to make an impact, being suspended for three matches in the final.

In 2012–13, Benfica hired Vítor Hugo and Nené. On 2 September 2012, they won their sixth Super Cup against Modicus (5–3) and tied with Sporting in terms of overall titles (17). After a series of bad results, including an early exit of the UEFA Futsal Cup, Paulo Fernandes was sacked and replaced by João Freitas Pinto. However, Benfica failed to retain the league title, losing 3–1 in the final against Sporting. In the offseason, Benfica did not renew the contract of Davi, Diego Sol, Diece, Marinho and César Paulo, replacing them with Ricardo Fernandes, Pablo del Moral, Rafael Henmi, Serginho, Bruno Pinto, Paulinho, Alan Brandi and Ivo Oliveira.

On 14 June 2015, Benfica became Portuguese champions for the seventh time and achieved their seventh double, defeating Sporting on penalties (2–3) in the fourth match of playoffs final. Benfica reached the playoff finals without defeat.

In August 2015, Benfica beat AD Fundão 6–3 and won the Super Cup. Benfica won again the Super Cup in October 2016, for a record eighth time, defeating Sporting 3–2. In the end of the season, Benfica beat Burinhosa and won their seventh Portuguese Cup (record). Later on, in January 2018, Benfica won their first League Cup with a 5–2 victory over Sporting.

== Season to season ==
Season	League		Portuguese Cup	League Cup	Super Cup	UEFA Champions League
Season	RS	PO	Portuguese Cup	League Cup	Super Cup	UEFA Champions League
2001–02	2nd	—	QF	Not held	—	—
2002–03	1st	—	Winners	Not held	—	—
2003–04	2nd	—	3rd round	Not held	Winners	Runners-up
2004–05	1st	Winners	Winners	Not held	—	—
2005–06	2nd	F	Runners-up	Not held	Runners-up	Second round
2006–07	1st	Winners	Winners	Not held	Winners	—
2007–08	1st	Winners	2nd round	Not held	Winners	Elite round
2008–09	1st	Winners	Winners	Not held	Runners-up	Elite round
2009–10	3rd	F	Runners-up	Not held	Winners	Winners
2010–11	1st	F	Runners-up	Not held	—	4th place
2011–12	1st	Winners	Winners	Not held	Winners	—
2012–13	2nd	F	QF	Not held	Winners	Main round
2013–14	1st	SF	Runners-up	Not held	—	—
2014–15	1st	Winners	Winners	Not held	—	—
2015–16	2nd	F	Runners-up	R1	Winners	3rd place
2016–17	2nd	SF	Winners	R1	Winners	—
2017–18	2nd	F	Runners-up	Winners	Runners-up	—
2018–19	1st	Winners	Runners-up	Winners	—	Elite round
2019–20	Cancelled due to the COVID-19 pandemic			Winners	Runners-up	Elite round
2020–21	2nd	F	Cancelled	Runners-up	Runners-up	Quarter-finalist
2021–22	2nd	F	Runners-up	Runners-up	Runners-up	3rd place
2022–23	3rd	F	Winners	Winners	Runners-up	3rd place
2023–24	3rd	SF	R16	Runners-up	Winners	3rd place
2024–25	2nd	Winners	Runners-up	SF	—	—
2025–26	1st	Winners	Winners	Winners	Runners-up	Quarter-Finalist
2026–27	—	—	—	—	Runners-up	Main Round

== Results in international competition ==
As of 2 November 2026

Note: Benfica score is always listed first. H = home ground; A = away

Season	Competition	Round	Opponent	Score
2003–04	UEFA Futsal Cup	1st Qualification Round Group 8	(Bosnia and Herzegovina) Kaskada Gračanica	11–0
2003–04	UEFA Futsal Cup	1st Qualification Round Group 8	(Greece) Athina 90	12–0
2003–04	UEFA Futsal Cup	1st Qualification Round Group 8	(Serbia) CD Shop Mozart Danilovgrad	4–2
2003–04	UEFA Futsal Cup	2nd Qualification Round Group B	(Italy) Prato Calcio a 5	5–2
2003–04	UEFA Futsal Cup	2nd Qualification Round Group B	(Croatia) MNK Split	7–0
2003–04	UEFA Futsal Cup	2nd Qualification Round Group B	(Belgium) Action 21 Charleroi	5–4
2003–04	UEFA Futsal Cup	Final	(Spain) Boomerang Interviú	1–4 (A); 4–3 (H)
2005	Intercontinental Futsal Cup	Qualification Round Group B	(Japan) Fire Fox Tokyo	11–0
2005	Intercontinental Futsal Cup	Qualification Round Group B	(Spain) Boomerang Interviú	1–8
2005	Intercontinental Futsal Cup	Third place match	(Brazil) Carlos Barbosa	0–4
2005–06	UEFA Futsal Cup	1st Qualification Round Group 3	(Armenia) Tal-Grig Yerevan	3–2
2005–06	UEFA Futsal Cup	1st Qualification Round Group 3	(Cyprus) Ararat Nicosia	5–0
2005–06	UEFA Futsal Cup	1st Qualification Round Group 3	(Hungary) Aramis Futsal Club	8–0
2005–06	UEFA Futsal Cup	2nd Qualification Round Group A	(Kazakhstan) Kairat Almaty	3–3
2005–06	UEFA Futsal Cup	2nd Qualification Round Group A	(Belgium) PB Morlanwelz	1–1
2005–06	UEFA Futsal Cup	2nd Qualification Round Group A	(Spain) Boomerang Interviú	2–4
2006–07	European Futsal Cup Winners Cup	Qualification Round Group A	(Russia) Spartak Shelkovo	3–3
2006–07	European Futsal Cup Winners Cup	Qualification Round Group A	(Spain) Azkar Lugo	8–5
2006–07	European Futsal Cup Winners Cup	Final	(Spain) Lobelle de Santiago	3–5
2007	Intercontinental Futsal Cup	Qualification Round Group A	(Japan) Nagoya Oceans	5–0
2007	Intercontinental Futsal Cup	Qualification Round Group A	(Brazil) Carlos Barbosa	6–1
2007	Intercontinental Futsal Cup	Qualification Round Group A	(Spain) Boomerang Interviú	2–3
2007	Intercontinental Futsal Cup	Semi-final	(Brazil) Malwee/Jaraguá	2–6
2007	Intercontinental Futsal Cup	Third place match	(Portugal) Sporting CP	2–4
2007–08	UEFA Futsal Cup	Elite Round Group B	(Italy) Luparense	2–2
2007–08	UEFA Futsal Cup	Elite Round Group B	(Russia) Dinamo Moskva	4–8
2007–08	UEFA Futsal Cup	Elite Round Group B	(Montenegro) Municipium Pljevlja	7–3
2008–09	UEFA Futsal Cup	Main Round Group 1	(Slovenia) KMN Gorica	2–1
2008–09	UEFA Futsal Cup	Main Round Group 1	(Greece) Athina 90	8–0
2008–09	UEFA Futsal Cup	Main Round Group 1	(Montenegro) KMF Municipium Pljevlja	6–1
2008–09	UEFA Futsal Cup	Elite Round Group D	(Israel) Hapoel Ironi R.L.	8–1
2008–09	UEFA Futsal Cup	Elite Round Group D	(Serbia) Ekonomac Kragujevac	8–1
2008–09	UEFA Futsal Cup	Elite Round Group D	(Spain) Boomerang Interviú	1–2
2009–10	UEFA Futsal Cup	Main Round Group 4	Montenegro Stars Budva	15–1
2009–10	UEFA Futsal Cup	Main Round Group 4	(Belarus) Viten Orsha	7–1
2009–10	UEFA Futsal Cup	Main Round Group 4	(Slovenia) KMN Puntar	4–2
2009–10	UEFA Futsal Cup	Elite Round Group 2	(Netherlands) FC Marlène	4–0
2009–10	UEFA Futsal Cup	Elite Round Group 2	(Croatia) MNK Potpican '98	8–1
2009–10	UEFA Futsal Cup	Elite Round Group 2	(Russia) Viz-Sinara Ekaterinburg	2–2
2009–10	UEFA Futsal Cup	Semi-final	(Italy) Luparense	8–4
2009–10	UEFA Futsal Cup	Final	(Spain) Interviú	3–2
2011	Intercontinental Futsal Cup	League	(Brazil) Carlos Barbosa	3–4
2011	Intercontinental Futsal Cup	League	(Spain) Interviú	2–4
2011	Intercontinental Futsal Cup	League	(Thailand) Bank Rbak	8–1
2010–11	UEFA Futsal Champions League	Elite Round Group A	(Serbia) Ekonomac Kragujevac	5–2
2010–11	UEFA Futsal Champions League	Elite Round Group A	(Croatia) Nacional Zagreb	1–0
2010–11	UEFA Futsal Champions League	Elite Round Group A	(Ukraine) Time Lviv	2–1
2010–11	UEFA Futsal Champions League	Semi-final	(Italy) Montesilvano	0–3
2010–11	UEFA Futsal Champions League	Third place match	(Kazakhstan) Kairat	3–3 (3–5 pen.)
2012–13	UEFA Futsal Champions League	Elite Round Group D	(Hungary) Győri ETO FC	3–3
2012–13	UEFA Futsal Champions League	Elite Round Group D	(Italy) Luparense	3–2
2012–13	UEFA Futsal Champions League	Elite Round Group D	(Georgia (country)) Iberia Star	4–7
2015–16	UEFA Futsal Champions League	Main Round Group 2	(Bosnia and Herzegovina) MNK Centar Sarajevo	8–2
2015–16	UEFA Futsal Champions League	Main Round Group 2	(Bulgaria) FC Grand Pro Varna	9–2
2015–16	UEFA Futsal Champions League	Main Round Group 2	(Slovenia) KMN Dobovec	6–1
2015–16	UEFA Futsal Champions League	Elite Round Group D	(Serbia) Ekonomac Kragujevac	3–0
2015–16	UEFA Futsal Champions League	Elite Round Group D	(Slovakia) Slov-Matic Bratislava	4–5
2015–16	UEFA Futsal Champions League	Elite Round Group D	(Ukraine) Lokomotiv Kharkiv	2–0
2015–16	UEFA Futsal Champions League	Semi-final	(Russia) Ugra	4–4 (a.e.t.) (2–3 pen.)
2015–16	UEFA Futsal Champions League	Third place match	(Italy) Pescara	2–2; 2–0 (pen.)
2018–19	UEFA Futsal Champions League	Main Round Group 1	(Belgium) Halle-Gooik	5–3
2018–19	UEFA Futsal Champions League	Main Round Group 1	(Spain) Barcelona	1–1
2018–19	UEFA Futsal Champions League	Main Round Group 1	(France) Kremlin-Bicêtre United	9–1
2018–19	UEFA Futsal Champions League	Elite Round Group C	(Croatia) MNK Novo Vrijeme	5–0
2018–19	UEFA Futsal Champions League	Elite Round Group C	(Russia) MFK Sibiryak	4–2
2018–19	UEFA Futsal Champions League	Elite Round Group C	(Portugal) Sporting CP	1–1
2019–20	UEFA Futsal Champions League	Main Round Group 2	(Belgium) Halle-Gooik	6–2
2019–20	UEFA Futsal Champions League	Main Round Group 2	(Azerbaijan) Araz Naxçivan	7–0
2019–20	UEFA Futsal Champions League	Main Round Group 2	(Ukraine) Prodexim Kherson	1–1
2019–20	UEFA Futsal Champions League	Elite Round Group C	(Italy) Pesaro	1–5
2019–20	UEFA Futsal Champions League	Elite Round Group C	(Spain) ElPozo	2–4
2019–20	UEFA Futsal Champions League	Elite Round Group C	(Kazakhstan) Kairat	5–3
2020–21	UEFA Futsal Champions League	Round of 32	(Switzerland) Minerva	5–1
2020–21	UEFA Futsal Champions League	Round of 16	(Hungary) MVFC Berettyóújfalu	5–0
2020–21	UEFA Futsal Champions League	Quarter-finals	(Kazakhstan) Kairat	2–6 (a.e.t.)
2021–22	UEFA Futsal Champions League	Main Round Group 1	(Belgium) Halle-Gooik	2–1
2021–22	UEFA Futsal Champions League	Main Round Group 1	(Russia) Sinara Yekaterinburg	5–1
2021–22	UEFA Futsal Champions League	Main Round Group 1	(Slovakia) Lučenec	10–1
2021–22	UEFA Futsal Champions League	Elite Round Group D	(Hungary) Haladás	8–3
2021–22	UEFA Futsal Champions League	Elite Round Group D	(Ukraine) Uragan	4–0
2021–22	UEFA Futsal Champions League	Elite Round Group D	(Spain) Levante	3–2
2021–22	UEFA Futsal Champions League	Semi-finals	(Spain) Barcelona	4–5 (a.e.t.)
2021–22	UEFA Futsal Champions League	Third place match	(France) ACCS	5–2
2022–23	UEFA Futsal Champions League	Main Round Group 4	(Hungary) Haladás	3–1
2022–23	UEFA Futsal Champions League	Main Round Group 4	(Ukraine) Uragan	4–1
2022–23	UEFA Futsal Champions League	Main Round Group 4	(Romania) United Galați	8–1
2022–23	UEFA Futsal Champions League	Elite Round Group C	(Czech Republic) FK Chrudim	3–3
2022–23	UEFA Futsal Champions League	Elite Round Group C	(Malta) Luxol St Andrews	6–0
2022–23	UEFA Futsal Champions League	Elite Round Group C	(Kazakhstan) Kairat	2–1
2022–23	UEFA Futsal Champions League	Semi-finals	(Spain) Palma Futsal	3–4
2022–23	UEFA Futsal Champions League	Third place match	(Belgium) Anderlecht	4–3
2023–24	UEFA Futsal Champions League	Main Round Group 4	(France) Étoile Lavalloise	2–2
2023–24	UEFA Futsal Champions League	Main Round Group 4	(Romania) United Galați	12–0
2023–24	UEFA Futsal Champions League	Main Round Group 4	(Slovenia) FK Dobovec	8–1
2023–24	UEFA Futsal Champions League	Elite Round Group B	(Slovenia) Dobovec	4–3
2023–24	UEFA Futsal Champions League	Elite Round Group B	(Kazakhstan) Kairat	3–2
2023–24	UEFA Futsal Champions League	Elite Round Group B	(Kosovo) Prishtina 01	10–1
2023–24	UEFA Futsal Champions League	Semi-finals	(Spain) Palma Futsal	4–4 (a.e.t.) (3–4 pen.)
2023–24	UEFA Futsal Champions League	Third place match	(Portugal) Sporting CP	6–3
2025–26	UEFA Futsal Champions League	Main Round – Path A Group 3	(Serbia) Loznica	9–0
2025–26	UEFA Futsal Champions League	Main Round – Path A Group 3	(Latvia) Riga FC	6–1
2025–26	UEFA Futsal Champions League	Main Round – Path A Group 3	(Malta) Luxol St. Andrews	6–1
2025–26	UEFA Futsal Champions League	R16	(United Arab Emirates) Araz Naxçivan	9–0 (A); 4–2 (H)
2025–26	UEFA Futsal Champions League	QF	(Portugal) Sporting	4–3 (H); 4–7 (A)
2026–27	UEFA Futsal Champions League	Main Round – Path A Group 4	(Ukraine) HIT Kyiv	4–4 (N)
2026–27	UEFA Futsal Champions League	Main Round – Path A Group 4	(Spain) ElPozo Murcia	3–2 (N)
2026–27	UEFA Futsal Champions League	Main Round – Path A Group 4	(Netherlands) Tigers Roermond	7–1 (N)

== Players ==
=== Current squad ===
As of 28 October 2026

Note: Flags indicate national team as defined under FIFA eligibility rules; some limited exceptions apply. Players may hold more than one non-FIFA nationality.

No.	Pos.	Nation	Player
1	GK	POR	André Correia
2	MF	POR	Silvestre Ferreira
4	DF	POR	Afonso Jesus (captain)
5	MF	POR	Diogo Almeida
6	DF	POR	Raúl Moreira
7	MF	POR	Lúcio Rocha
8	DF	POR	André Coelho
10	MF	BRA	Arthur
11	FW	POR	Eduardo Tchuda

No.	Pos.	Nation	Player
13	MF	POR	Pany Varela
14	MF	POR	Kutchy
16	GK	POR	Vasco Pinto
17	MF	POR	Carlos Monteiro
19	FW	POR	Ruben Góis
20	MF	ANG	Anderson Fortes
22	GK	BRA	Léo Gugiel
77	MF	BRA	Cléber Souza

=== First-team staff ===
- Head coach: Cassiano Klein
- Assistant coach: Estevão Cordovil
- Goalkeeping coach: Vítor Hugo
- Fitness coach: Raphael Martins
- Analyst coach: André Chaveiro
- Coordinator: Raúl Moreira
- Team manager: Gonçalo Alves

== Honours ==
=== Domestic competitions ===
- Liga Portuguesa

Winners (10): 2002–03, 2004–05, 2006–07, 2007–08, 2008–09, 2011–12, 2014–15, 2018–19, 2024–25, 2025-26

- Taça de Portugal

Winners (9): 2002–03, 2004–05, 2006–07, 2008–09, 2011–12, 2014–15, 2016–17, 2022–23, 2025-26

- Taça da Liga

Winners (5): 2017–18, 2018–19, 2019–20, 2022–23, 2025-26

- Supertaça de Portugal

Winners (9): 2003, 2006, 2007, 2009, 2011, 2012, 2015, 2016, 2023

=== International competitions ===
- UEFA Futsal Champions League

Winners (1): 2009–10

== Women's team ==
=== Current squad ===
As of 8 September 2025

Note: Flags indicate national team as defined under FIFA eligibility rules; some limited exceptions apply. Players may hold more than one non-FIFA nationality.

No.	Pos.	Nation	Player
1	GK	POR	Ana Catarina
4	DF	BRA	Bruna Carolina
6	DF	POR	Inês Fernandes (captain)
7	MF	POR	Maria Pereira
8	FW	POR	Janice Silva
9	MF	POR	Fifó
10	MF	POR	Sara Ferreira
11	FW	POR	Madalena Frederique

No.	Pos.	Nation	Player
12	GK	POR	Alexandra Melo
13	DF	POR	Inês Matos
16	GK	POR	Maria Inês
17	FW	POR	Angélica Alves
18	MF	POR	Ana Oliveira
19	MF	POR	Sofia Calheiros
20	MF	POR	Raquel Santos
99	MF	BRA	Nati Detoni

=== First-team staff ===
- Head Coach: Paulo Roxo
- Assistant Coach: Fábio Jerónimo
- Goalkeeping Coach: Alexandre Rodrigues
- Analyst Coach: Pedro Canelas
- Coordinator: Raúl Moreira
- Team Manager: Rita Martins

== Women's honours ==
=== Regional competitions ===
- Lisbon Championship

Winners (5): 2004–05, 2005–06, 2006–07, 2007–08, 2009–10

- Lisbon Honour Cup

Winners (10): 2004–05, 2005–06, 2006–07, 2007–08, 2008–09, 2009–10, 2010–11, 2011–12, 2012–13, 2014–15

- Taça de Honra AF Lisboa

Winners: 2016

=== National competitions ===
- Portuguese League

Winners (8) – record: 2016–17, 2017–18, 2018–19, 2020–21, 2021–22, 2022–23, 2023–24, 2025-26

- Portuguese Cup

Winners (10) – record: 2013–14, 2015–16, 2016–17, 2017–18, 2018–19, 2019–20, 2022–23, 2023–24, 2024–25, 2025-26

- Taça da Liga

Winners (3) – shared record: 2020–21, 2022–23, 2024–25

- Portuguese Super Cup

Winners (10) – record: 2014, 2016, 2017, 2018, 2019, 2021, 2022, 2023, 2024, 2026

=== European competitions ===
- Futsal Women's European Champions

Winners (1): 2023

=== Other competitions ===
- Iberian Cup

Winners (3): 2007, 2024, 2026
