= José Venancio López =

Guatemalan politician (1791–1863)

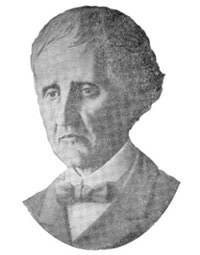
Portrait of López

José Venancio López (May 13, 1791 in New Guatemala de la Asunción, General Captaincy of Guatemala – September 26, 1863 in Ibid, Guatemala) was a Guatemalan jurist and politician, First President of the Supreme Court, president of the Chamber of Representatives and became 2nd President of the State of Guatemala (25 February 1842 to 14 May 1842).

== Later life ==
After retiring to private life, he was regent of the chair of law at the National and Pontifical University of San Carlos Borromeo.
