= Portimonense S.C. (futsal) =

Portimonense
- Full name: Portimonense Sporting Clube
- Ground: Pavilhão Gimnodesportivo de Portimão; Portimão, Portugal
- Capacity: 235
- Chairman: Fernando Rocha
- Manager: Pedro Moreira
- League: Liga Portuguesa de Futsal
- 2018–19: II Divisão Futsal; Series F: 1st South Zone: 1st Playoffs: Finalist

Portimonense Sporting Clube is a futsal team based in the city of Portimão, Portugal, that plays in the Portuguese Futsal First Division. It is a part of the Portimonense sports club. In 2019 Portimonense won the South Zone series of the Portuguese II Divisão Futsal achieving the promotion to the first tier Liga Sport Zone for the first time in its history, and becoming the first team from the Algarve to play in the competition.

== Current squad ==
As of 18 February 2021

#	Position	Name	Nationality
8	Winger	Filipinho	(Portugal)
9	Pivot	André Rochato	(Portugal)
10	Winger	Paulinho	(Portugal)
12	Winger	Divanei	(Brazil)
14	Winger	Júnior	(Portugal)
15	Universal	Paulinho Rocha	(Portugal)
16	Goalkeeper	Márcio Palma	(Portugal)
16	Goalkeeper	Pedro Bernardino	(Portugal)
18	Winger	Nuno Miranda	(Portugal)
19	Winger	Caio Ruiz	(Brazil)
21	Winger	Deivão	(Brazil)
22	Goalkeeper	Moreira	(Portugal)
25	Pivot	João Vigário	(Portugal)
41	Winger	Wendell	(Brazil)
96	Goalkeeper	Gutta	(Portugal)
