= Os Vinhais =

- Full name: Clube Desportivo Recreativo Os Vinhais
- Ground: Pavilhão do Vinhais; São Domingos de Rana, Portugal
- Capacity: 350
- Chairman: Tiago Ferreira
- Manager: Rogério Ferreira
- League: II Divisão Futsal
- 2017–18: II Divisão Futsal; Series F: 8th Relegation playoffs Series F: 4th
- Website: http://www.cdrvinhais.pt/

Clube Desportivo Recreativo Os Vinhais is a futsal team based in the village of São Domingos de Rana, Portugal, that plays in the Portuguese second tier II Divisão Futsal. Os Vinhas was promoted to the top tier Portuguese Futsal First Division for the 2016/17 but failed to stay up finishing last place and being relegated back to the II Divisão Futsal.
