= José Ruiz (futsal player) =

Spanish futsal player (born 1983)

Personal information
- Full name: José Miguel Ruiz Cortés
- Date of birth: 6 June 1983 (age 43)
- Place of birth: Barcelona, Spain
- Position: Defender

Team information
- Current team: ElPozo Murcia
- Number: 3

Youth career
- Martorell

Senior career*
Years	Team	Apps	(Gls)
2000–02	Olesa		
2003–04	Barcelona		
2004–07	Martorell		
2007–10	Guadalajara		
2010–12	Manacor		
2012–	ElPozo Murcia		

International career
- Spain
- * Club domestic league appearances and goals

José Miguel Ruiz Cortés (born 6 June 1983), commonly known as José Ruiz, is a Spanish futsal player who plays for ElPozo Murcia as a Defender.
