= Filipe Soares (footballer, born 1994) =

Portuguese footballer

Personal information
- Full name: Filipe José Valente Vinagre Soares
- Date of birth: 28 November 1994 (age 31)
- Place of birth: Alvor, Portimão, Portugal
- Height: 1.68 m (5 ft 6 in)
- Positions: Midfielder; winger

Youth career
- 2004–2007: ACR Alvorense
- 2008–2011: Esperança de Lagos
- 2011–2013: Portimonense

Senior career*
Years	Team	Apps	(Gls)
2013–2015	Portimonense		
2013–2014	→ Quarteirense (loan)		
2015–2017	Portimonense (futsal)		
2017–2019	Burinhosa (futsal)		
2019–2022	Portimonense (futsal)		
2022–2023	Albufeira Futsal		
2023–2024	Pedra Mourinha Futsal		
2024–2025	Albufeira Futsal		
2025–	Portimonense (futsal)		
- * Club domestic league appearances and goals as of 30 January 2026

Filipe José Valente Vinagre Soares (born 28 November 1994), also known as Filipinho, is a Portuguese former footballer and a futsal player.

== Football career ==
On 1 September 2013, Soares made his professional debut with Portimonense in a 2013–14 Segunda Liga match against Atlético replacing Mica (81st minute). Soares played for only three seasons, one of which was on loan to CDR Quarteirense.

== Futsal career ==
In 2015 he resumed his career as a futsal player, playing mainly for the Portimonense team during those years.
