= Valbom =

- Civil parish
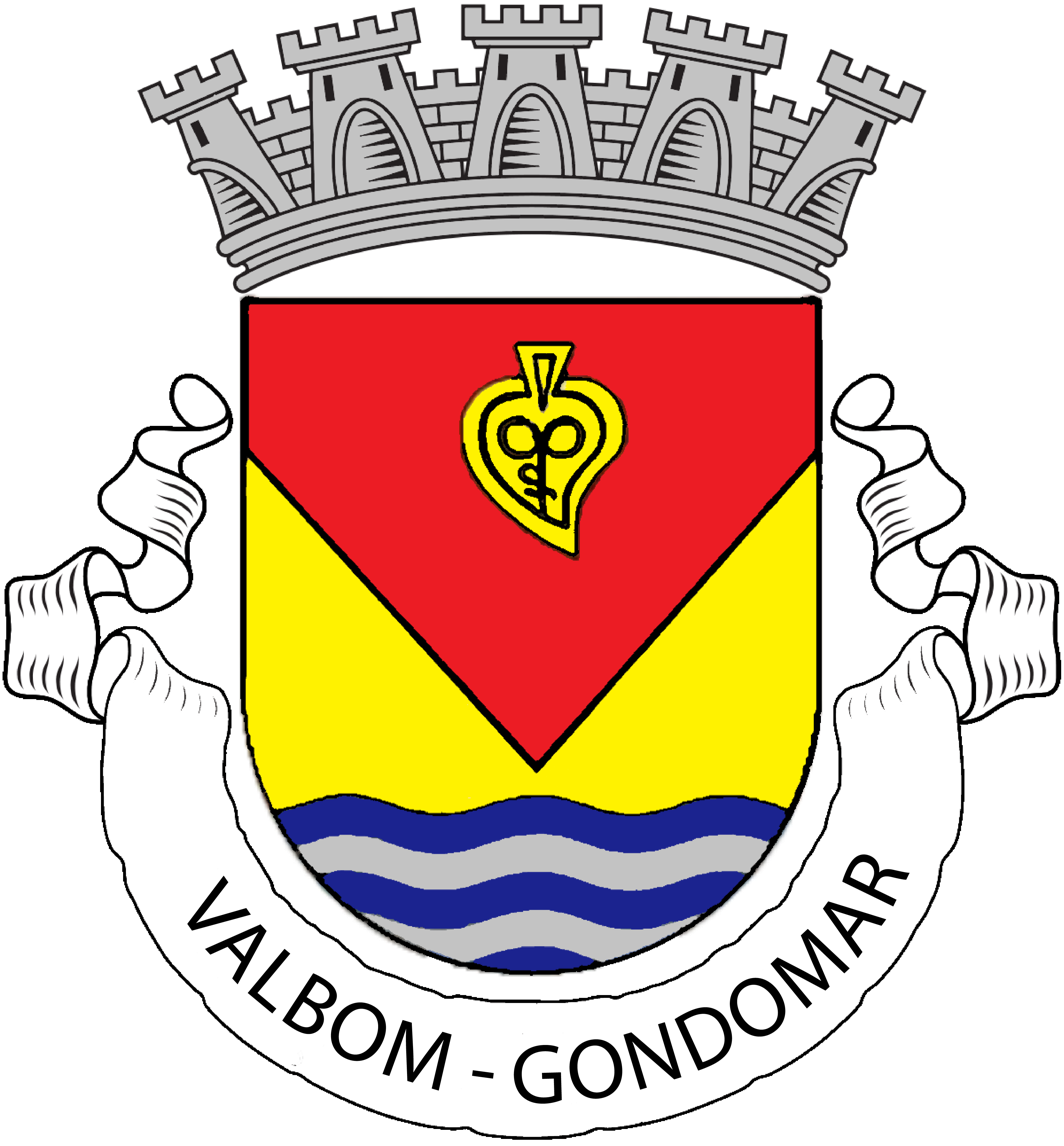
- Coat of arms

- Coordinates: 41°08′00″N 8°34′00″W
- Country: Portugal
- Region: Norte
- Metropolitan area: Porto
- District: Porto
- Municipality: Gondomar
- Disbanded: 2013

Area
  - Total: 4.55 km^{2} (1.76 sq mi)

Population (2011)
  - Total: 14,407
  - Density: 3,170/km^{2} (8,200/sq mi)
- Time zone: UTC+00:00 (WET)
  - Summer (DST): UTC+01:00 (WEST)

Valbom is a city and a former civil parish in the municipality of Gondomar, Portugal. In 2013, the parish merged into the new parish Gondomar (São Cosme), Valbom e Jovim. It has about 15,000 residents. It was elevated to city status on 9 December 2004. For generations Valbom was a fishing village, due to its location by the river Douro. Today, local crafts dominate the economy.

It was here, in the house called "Casa Branca", that the Convention of Gramido was signed on 29 June 1847, ending the civil war of the Septembrists against the Cartists known as the Patuleia.
