= Saša Babić =

Croatian futsal player

Babić
Personal information
- Full name: Saša Babić
- Date of birth: 4 August 1989 (age 37)
- Place of birth: Croatia
- Position: Ala

Team information
- Current team: Kijevo Knauf

International career^{‡}
Years	Team	Apps	(Gls)
2011–2017	Croatia	65	(10)
- ‡ National team caps and goals as of 25 November 2019

Saša Babić (born 4 August 1989) is a Croatian futsal player who plays for MNK Kijevo Knauf and the Croatia national futsal team.
