= ARCD Junqueira =

Junqueira
- Full name: Associação Recreativa, Cultural e Desportiva; Junqueira Futebol Clube - A.R.C.D.J.F.C.
- Founded: 1969
- Ground: Pavilhão Municipal Santa Cruz do Bispo, Santa Cruz do Bispo, Portugal
- Capacity: 4,500
- League: Portuguese Futsal First Division
Home colours

Associação Recreativa, Cultural e Desportiva Junqueira Futebol Clube - A.R.C.D.J.F.C. Is an amateur futsal team based in Santa Cruz do Bispo, Portugal. It plays in Portuguese Futsal First Division.
