= CS São João =

Futsal team based in Portugal

- Full name: Centro Social de São João
- Ground: Pavilhão do Centro Social de São João; Pé de Cão, Portugal
- Capacity: 700
- Chairman: Alcides Lopes
- Manager: Alcides Lopes
- League: Liga Sport Zone
- 2015–16: Overall table: 11th Playoffs: Did not qualify

Centro Social de São João is a futsal team based in the village of Pé de Cão in the freguesia of São Martinho do Bispo e Ribeira de Frades, Portugal, that plays in the Portuguese Futsal First Division.

== Current squad ==
As of 5 December 2016

#	Position	Name	Nationality
1	Goalkeeper	João Gregório	(Portugal)
2	Defender	Tiago Salgado	(Portugal)
3	Winger	Pedro Buco	(Portugal)
4	Defender	Zeca Rodrigues	(Portugal)
5	Winger	Zito Devesa	(Portugal)
5	Pivot	Bruno Ferreira	(Portugal)
6	Universal	Picasso	(Portugal)
7	Winger	Gustavo Martins	(Portugal)
8	Winger	Tiago Jardel	(Portugal)
10	Winger	Josiel Feitosa	(Brazil)
11	Pivot	Claudinho	(Brazil)
11	Winger	Francisco Cardoso	(Portugal)
12	Goalkeeper	Pedro Marques	(Portugal)
12	Goalkeeper	José Cruz	(Portugal)
12	Goalkeeper	Leandro Costa	(Portugal)
14	Defender	Gonçalo Barão	(Portugal)
15	Universal	João Lopes	(Portugal)
18	Winger	Bruno Carvalho	(Portugal)
19	Winger	André Batalha	(Portugal)
20	Pivot	Cássio Coelho	(Brazil)
24	Goalkeeper	Miguel Valença	(Portugal)
	Defender	André Silva	(Portugal)
