= Marian Șotărcă =

Romanian futsal player

Șotărcă
Personal information
- Full name: Marian Șotărcă
- Date of birth: 12 November 1980 (age 45)
- Place of birth: Romania
- Position: Ala

Team information
- Current team: Andorra

International career
Years	Team	Apps	(Gls)
- Romania

Marian Șotărcă (born 12 November 1980), is a Romanian futsal player who plays for Andorra and the Romanian national futsal team.
