= Joel Queirós =

Portuguese futsal player (born 1982)

Personal information
- Full name: Joel Ricardo Ribeiro Queirós
- Date of birth: 21 May 1982 (age 44)
- Place of birth: Porto, Portugal
- Height: 1.92 m (6 ft 4 in)
- Position: Pivot

Team information
- Current team: Modicus Sandim
- Number: 25

Youth career
- 1991–1992: Bom Pastor (football)
- 1993–1995: Porto (football)
- 1995–1997: Infesta (football)
- 1997–2000: Gaia
- 2000–2001: Boavista

Senior career*
Years	Team	Apps	(Gls)
2001–2004	Freixieiro		
2004–2007	ElPozo Murcia		
2007–2009	Xota FS		
2009–2014	Benfica		
2014–2016	Novaya Generatsiya		
2016–2017	KPRF Moskva		
2017–	Modicus Sandim	41	(34)

International career^{‡}
2002–2014	Portugal	143	(107)
- * Club domestic league appearances and goals as of 00:00, 15 August 2018 (UTC) ‡ National team caps and goals as of 00:00, 4 July 2016 (UTC)

Joel Ricardo Ribeiro Queirós (born 21 May 1982) is a Portuguese futsal player who plays as a pivot for Modicus Sandim and formerly played for the Portugal national team.

== Honours ==
=== Club ===
Freixieiro

- Liga Portuguesa: 2001–02
- Supertaça de Portugal: 2002

ElPozo Murcia

- Primera División: 2005–06, 2006–07
- Supercopa de España: 2006

Benfica

- Liga Portuguesa: 2011–12
- Taça de Portugal: 2011–12
- Supertaça de Portugal: 2011, 2012
- UEFA Futsal Cup: 2009–10

=== Country ===
Portugal

- UEFA Futsal Championship: Runner-up 2010

=== Individual ===
- UEFA Futsal Championship Golden Boot: 2010
