= Filipe Soares (footballer, born 2000) =

Portuguese footballer

Personal information
- Full name: Filipe Correia Soares
- Date of birth: 27 January 2000 (age 26)
- Place of birth: Viseu, Portugal
- Height: 1.85 m (6 ft 1 in)
- Position: Centre back

Team information
- Current team: Castro Daire

Youth career
- 2008–2013: Viseu e Benfica
- 2013–2019: Académico Viseu

Senior career*
Years	Team	Apps	(Gls)
2019–2021	Académico Viseu	5	(0)
2021–2023	Ferreira de Aves	22	(0)
2022–	Castro Daire	24	(0)
- * Club domestic league appearances and goals as of 27 May 2023

Filipe Correia Soares (born 27 January 2000) is a Portuguese footballer who plays for Castro Daire as a defender.

== Football career ==
He made his professional debut for Académico Viseu on 8 February 2020 in the LigaPro.
