= Pedro Costa (futsal player) =

Portuguese futsal player and coach

Personal information
- Full name: Pedro Alexandre da Silva da Costa
- Date of birth: 18 December 1978 (age 47)
- Place of birth: São Sebastião da Pedreira, Portugal
- Height: 1.65 m (5 ft 5 in)
- Position: Universal

Youth career
- 1992–1993: UP Venda Nova
- 1993–1994: Del Negro
- 1994–1996: Sporting

Senior career*
| Years | Team | Apps | (Gls) |
| 1995–2001 | Sporting | | |
| 2001-2002 | Freixieiro | | |
| 2002–2005 | Benfica | | |
| 2005–2006 | Playas de Castellón | | |
| 2006–2011 | Benfica | | |
| 2011–2016 | Nagoya Oceans | | |

International career^{‡}
| 2000 | Portugal U21 | 2 | (3) |
| 2001 | Portugal U23 | 2 | (0) |
| 2000–2014 | Portugal | 119 | (53) |

Managerial career
- 2016–2019: Nagoya Oceans
- * Club domestic league appearances and goals as of 20 September 2012 ‡ National team caps and goals as of 24 June 2015

Pedro Alexandre da Silva da Costa (born 18 December 1978), also known as Costinha, is a Portuguese professional futsal coach. A former player, he played as a universal.

== Career ==
Born in São Sebastião da Pedreira, Costa started playing futsal at UP da Venda Nova, progressing to GCD Del Negro in the year before joining Sporting youth ranks, in 1994. In 1995–96, at age 18, he started playing in the first team, staying there for six seasons, winning two league titles and arriving at the national team.

He then had a one-year stint at Freixieiro, helping the club conquer their only league title, before joining Benfica in July 2002. In the eight years he spent with them, with exception of a one-year break to play for Playas de Castellón, he won five league titles, four Portuguese cups, plus captained them in their historic UEFA Futsal Cup win in 2009–10, winning a total of 15 titles.

On 6 July 2011, Costa moved to Japan to compete for Nagoya Oceans, winning numerous titles, including two AFC Futsal Club. He announced his retirement in 2016, subsequently assuming the managerial role of Nagoya Oceans.

== Honours ==
=== Player ===
Sporting CP

- Liga Portuguesa (2): 1998–99, 2000–01
- Supertaça de Portugal (1): 2001

Freixieiro

- Liga Portuguesa (1): 2001–02

Benfica

- UEFA Futsal Cup (1): 2009–10
- Liga Portuguesa (5): 2002–03, 2004–05, 2006–07, 2007–08, 2008–09
- Taça de Portugal (4): 2002–03, 2004–05, 2006–07, 2008–09
- Supertaça de Portugal (4): 2003, 2006, 2007, 2009

Nagoya Oceans

- AFC Futsal Club Championship (2): 2011, 2014
- F. League (6): 2010–11, 2011–12, 2012–13, 2013–14, 2014–15, 2015–16
- Ocean Arena Cup (4): 2011, 2012, 2013, 2014
- Japan Futsal Championship (3): 2011, 2014, 2015

=== Manager ===
Nagoya Oceans

- AFC Futsal Club Championship (1): 2016
- F.League (2): 2017–18, 2018-19
- F.League Ocean Cup (3): 2017, 2018, 2019
- Japan Futsal Championship (2): 2018, 2019
