= Taça da Liga de Futsal =

- Founded: 2016
- Region: Portugal
- Teams: 8
- Current champions: Sporting CP (6th title)
- Most championships: Sporting CP (6 titles)
- Broadcaster: TVI24
- Website: Website

The Taça da Liga de Futsal (English: Portuguese Futsal League Cup) is the second Portuguese futsal knock-out competition. It was created in 2016 to be disputed in a yearly basis by the eight-best ranked teams of the National Championship at the end of the latter's first half of the regular stage, and is organized by the Portuguese Football Federation.

Sporting CP were the inaugural winners in 2016 and are the current holders of the competition, having won it a record six times.

== Taça da Liga finals ==
Season	Winners	Score	Runners-up
2015–16	Sporting CP	2–0	AD Fundão
2016–17	Sporting CP (2)	4–0	AD Fundão
2017–18	Benfica	5–2	Sporting CP
2018–19	Benfica (2)	3–0	Braga/AAUM
2019–20	Benfica (3)	5–4	Sporting CP
2020–21	Sporting CP (3)	6–2	Benfica
2021–22	Sporting CP (4)	5–2	Benfica
2022–23	Benfica (4)	3–0	Quinta dos Lombos
2023–24	Sporting CP (5)	4-2	Benfica
2024–25	Sporting CP (6)	9-0	Quinta dos Lombos

=== Performance by club ===
Club	Winners	Runners-up	Winning years and runner-up years
Sporting CP	6	2	2016, 2017, 2018, 2020, 2021, 2022, 2024, 2025
Benfica	5	3	2018, 2019, 2020, 2023, 2026, 2021, 2022, 2024
AD Fundão	–	2	2016, 2017
Braga/AAUM	–	1	2019
Quinta dos Lombos	–	2	2023, 2025
