= Rio Ave F.C. (futsal) =

Rio Ave
- Full name: Rio Ave Futebol Clube
- Ground: Pavilhão Municipal de Desportos; Vila do Conde, Portugal
- Capacity: 800
- Chairman: António Silva Campos
- Manager: Paulo Morim
- League: Liga Sport Zone
- 2015–16: Overall table: 12th Playoffs: Did not qualify
- Website: http://www.rioavefc.pt/
Home colours

Rio Ave Futebol Clube is a futsal team based in the city of Vila do Conde, Portugal, that plays in the Portuguese Futsal First Division. It is a part of the Rio Ave sports club.

== Current squad ==
As of 14 May 2019

#	Position	Name	Nationality
1	Goalkeeper	Chico Braga	(Portugal)
4	Defender	Lincon Neto	(Brazil)
5	Winger	Renato Pontes	(Portugal)
6	Winger	Cigano	(Portugal)
7	Winger	Pedro Ferreira	(Portugal)
8	Universal	Eli Júnior	(Brazil)
9	Winger	Jefferson Melo	(Brazil)
10	Pivot	Felipe Simas	(Brazil)
11	Winger	Rubinho	(Portugal)
12	Goalkeeper	Sandro Barradas	(Portugal)
13	Pivot	Vinícius Silva	(Brazil)
14	Defender	Tiago Monteiro	(Portugal)
15	Universal	Francisco Meireles	(Portugal)
15	Winger	Manuel Silva	(Portugal)
16	Winger	Arnaldo Pereira	(Portugal)
17	Pivot	Fred Torres	(Portugal)
20	Universal	João Pedro Ferreira	(Portugal)
21	Winger	Alex Ribeiro	(Portugal)
