= Gondomar (São Cosme), Valbom e Jovim =

- Civil parish
- Location in Portugal
- Coordinates: 41.139°N 8.532°W
- Country: Portugal
- Region: Norte
- Metropolitan area: Porto
- District: Porto
- Municipality: Gondomar

Area
  - Total: 23.32 km^{2} (9.00 sq mi)

Population (2011)
  - Total: 48,600
  - Density: 2,100/km^{2} (5,400/sq mi)
- Time zone: UTC+00:00 (WET)
  - Summer (DST): UTC+01:00 (WEST)

Gondomar (São Cosme), Valbom e Jovim is a civil parish in the municipality of Gondomar, Portugal. It was formed in 2013 by the merger of the former parishes Gondomar (São Cosme), Valbom and Jovim. The population in 2011 was 48,600, in an area of 23.32 km^{2}.
