= Futsal Azeméis =

- Full name: Futsal Clube Azeméis
- Ground: Pavilhão Municipal de Oliveira de Azeméis; Oliveira de Azeméis, Portugal
- Capacity: 250
- Chairman: Marco Aurélio Silva
- Manager: Ricardo Tavares Canavarro
- League: Liga Sport Zone
- 2015–16: II Divisão Futsal; Series C: 2nd North Zone: 1st Playoffs: Champions

Futsal Clube Azeméis is a futsal team based in the city of Oliveira de Azeméis, Portugal, that plays in the Portuguese Futsal First Division.

== Current squad ==
As of 10 May 2019

No.	Position	Name	Nationality
1	Goalkeeper	Ricardo Moreira	(Portugal)
1	Goalkeeper	Joel Silva	(Portugal)
2	Winger	Rúben Freire	(Portugal)
3	Winger	João Couto	(Portugal)
8	Winger	Emerson Ribeiro	(Brazil)
9	Winger	Ruan Silvestre	(Brazil)
10	Pivot	Vitinha	(Portugal)
13	Pivot	Rafael Lara	(Brazil)
14	Winger	Tiago Sousa	(Portugal)
18	Universal	Samuel Silva	(Portugal)
19	Goalkeeper	Cristiano Parreiro	(Portugal)
20	Goalkeeper	Rafael Tavares	(Portugal)
24	Winger	Israel Alves	(Portugal)
26	Winger	Coco	(Portugal)
77	Winger	Quaresma	(Portugal)
99	Pivot	Jacaré	(Brazil)
	Defender	Diogo Almeida	(Portugal)

=== Out on loan ===
Note: Flags indicate national team as defined under FIFA eligibility rules; some limited exceptions apply. Players may hold more than one non-FIFA nationality.

No. / Pos. / Nation / Player; — / MF / (Brazil) BRA / Igor Nascimento (on loan to ABC Nelas until 30 June 2019)	No. / Pos. / Nation / Player
