= Unidos Pinheirense =

- Full name: Futebol Clube Unidos Pinheirense
- Ground: Pavilhão Municipal de Valbom; Valbom, Portugal
- Chairman: Marco Vigário
- Manager: Pedro Henriques
- League: Liga Sport Zone
- 2015–16: II Divisão Futsal; Series B: 1st North Zone: 2nd

Futebol Clube Unidos Pinheirense is a sports club based in the village of Valbom, Portugal. The futsal team of Unidos Pinheirense plays in the Portuguese Futsal First Division.

== Current squad ==
As of 14 May 2019

#	Position	Name	Nationality
1	Goalkeeper	Ari Guimarães	(Portugal)
2	Universal	Pirata	(Portugal)
3	Winger	Ricardo Fernandes	(Portugal)
4	Winger	Bruno Martínez	(Portugal)
6	Universal	Paulinho Rocha	(Portugal)
7	Winger	Tiago Soares	(Portugal)
8	Winger	Benny Marinho	(Portugal)
9	Pivot	André Cardoso	(Portugal)
10	Universal	Ruca	(Portugal)
10	Defender	Ricardo Gonçalves	(Portugal)
11	Defender	Fábio Peixinho	(Portugal)
12	Goalkeeper	Bruno Santos	(Portugal)
21	Winger	Sérgio Bianchi	(Portugal)
24	Goalkeeper	Nuno Costa	(Portugal)
25	Universal	João Vigário	(Portugal)
28	Defender	Márcio Pinto	(Portugal)
