= Gonçalo Alves =

Portuguese futsal player

Personal information
- Full name: Gonçalo Nunes Borges Ferreira Gomes Alves
- Date of birth: 1 July 1977 (age 49)
- Place of birth: Lisbon, Portugal
- Height: 1.75 m (5 ft 9 in)
- Positions: Defender; winger

Youth career
- 1991–1992: AC Odivelas
- 1993–1995: Sporting CP

Senior career*
Years	Team	Apps	(Gls)
1996–2000	GD Bons Dias		
2000–2006	Sporting CP		
2006–2017	Benfica		

International career
	Portugal U-23	2	(0)
2001–2014	Portugal	171	(75)
- * Club domestic league appearances and goals

Gonçalo Nuno Borges Ferreira Gomes Alves (born 1 July 1977) is a Portuguese former futsal player who played as a winger and defender.

At club level, he most notably represented Benfica, with whom he won 18 major titles in 11 seasons – the last 6 years as team captain. On 8 October 2014, he retired from international duty as the most capped player of all time for the Portugal national team.

After ending his career as player, Alves became team manager of Benfica.

== Honours ==
Benfica

- Liga Portuguesa: 2006–07, 2007–08, 2008–09, 2011–12, 2014–15
- Taça de Portugal: 2006–07, 2008–09, 2011–12, 2014–15, 2016–17
- Supertaça de Portugal: 2006, 2007, 2009, 2011, 2012, 2015, 2016
- UEFA Futsal Cup: 2009–10
