= Modicus =

- Full name: Movimento Dinâmico e Cultural de Sandim
- Founded: 1975
- Ground: Pavilhão do MODICUS; Sandim; Portugal
- Capacity: 700
- Chairman: (Portugal) António Joaquim Lopes Quelhas
- Manager: (Portugal) Ricardo Ferreira
- League: Portuguese Futsal First Division
| Home colours | Away colours |

Movimento Dinâmico e Cultural de Sandim Is an amateur futsal team based in Sandim, Portugal. It plays in Portuguese Futsal First Division.

== Futsal ==
=== Current squad ===
As of 15 May 2019

| # | Position | Name | Nationality |
|---|---|---|---|
| 1 | Goalkeeper | Rui Pedro | (Portugal) |
| 3 | Goalkeeper | Gerson Pinho | (Portugal) |
| 4 | Winger | Paulinho | (Portugal) |
| 6 | Winger | Uesler Schäfer | (Brazil) |
| 7 | Winger | Gabriel Pereira | (Portugal) |
| 8 | Defender | Paulo Major | (Portugal) |
| 9 | Winger | Fábio Lima | (Portugal) |
| 10 | Defender | Óscar Santos | (Portugal) |
| 13 | Winger | Pedrinho | (Portugal) |
| 14 | Pivot | Willian Carioca | (Brazil) |
| 16 | Goalkeeper | Tiago Trapa | (Portugal) |
| 25 | Pivot | Joel Queirós | (Portugal) |
| 77 | Winger | Luís Ferreira | (Portugal) |
| 79 | Winger | Bruninho | (Brazil) |
| 90 | Pivot | Marco Campos | (Portugal) |

=== Out on loan ===
Note: Flags indicate national team as defined under FIFA eligibility rules; some limited exceptions apply. Players may hold more than one non-FIFA nationality.

| No. / Pos. / Nation / Player; 17 / MF / (Portugal) POR / Rúben Reis (on loan to FC Differdange 03 until 30 June 2019) | No. / Pos. / Nation / Player; 77 / DF / (Portugal) POR / Valter Batista (on loan to Dínamo Sanjoanense until 30 June 2019) |

=== Honours ===
- Taça de Portugal de Futsal:
  - Runner-up (1): 2011–12
- SuperTaça de Futsal de Portugal:
  - Runner-up (1): 2012
