= Portugal national futsal team =

National sports team

Portugal
- Nickname(s): Seleção das Quinas
- Association: Federação Portuguesa de Futebol
- Confederation: UEFA (Europe)
- Head coach: (Portugal) Jorge Braz
- Captain: João Matos
- Most caps: Arnaldo Pereira (208)
- Top scorer: Ricardinho (142)
- FIFA code: POR
- FIFA ranking: 2 (24 September 2026)
- Highest FIFA ranking: 2 (May 2024 – August 2025)
Home colours	Away colours

First international
- Spain 4–0 Portugal (A Coruña, Spain; 9 February 1987)

Biggest win
- Portugal 56–0 Timor-Leste (Macau, China; 9 October 2006)

Biggest defeat
- Portugal 0–8 Brazil (Guatemala City, Guatemala; 1 December 2000)

FIFA World Cup
- Appearances: 7 (First in 2000)
- Best result: (gold) Champions (2021)

AMF World Cup
- Appearances: 5 (First in 1985)
- Best result: (gold) Champions (1991)

European Championship
- Appearances: 11 (First in 1999)
- Best result: (gold) Champions (2018, 2022)

Grand Prix de Futsal
- Appearances: 1 (First in 2010)
- Best result: Sixth place (2010)

The Portugal national futsal team represents Portugal in international men's futsal competitions and is controlled by the Portuguese Football Federation. Portugal has won the 2021 FIFA Futsal World Cup, the European Championship in 2018 and 2022 and the 2022 Futsal Finalissima. They are one of only four teams to win the World Cup as well as one of four to be crowned European champions and the winners of the first ever Futsal Finalissima. Portugal are, together with Spain, the only team from UEFA to be world champions and the only team, also alongside Spain, to successfully defend their European title. They are the only team to win the World Cup title as reigning European champions.

== Results and fixtures ==
The following is a list of match results in the last 12 months, as well as any future matches that have been scheduled.

Legend

Win Draw Loss Fixture

=== 2021 ===
13 September 2021 FIFA Futsal World Cup GS Group C	Thailand	1–4	Portugal	Kaunas, Lithuania
20:00 EEST (UTC+3)		Report (FIFA)		Stadium: Žalgiris Arena; Attendance: 362; Referee: Ronny Zumbado Costa Rica)

16 September 2021 FIFA Futsal World Cup GS Group C	Solomon Islands	0–7	Portugal	Kaunas, Lithuania
18:00 EEST (UTC+3)		Report (FIFA)		Stadium: Žalgiris Arena; Attendance: 345; Referee: Carlos Martínez Paraguay)

19 September 2021 FIFA Futsal World Cup GS Group C	Portugal	3–3	Morocco	Klaipėda, Lithuania
18:00 EEST (UTC+3)		Report (FIFA)		Stadium: Švyturys Arena; Attendance: 1,860; Referee: Anthony Riley New Zealand)

24 September 2021 FIFA Futsal World Cup Round of 16	Portugal	4–3 (a.e.t.)	Serbia	Kaunas, Lithuania
20:00 EEST (UTC+3)		Report (FIFA)		Stadium: Žalgiris Arena; Attendance: 782; Referee: Daniel Rodríguez Uruguay)

27 September 2021 FIFA Futsal World Cup Quarter-finals	Spain	2–4 (a.e.t.)	Portugal	Vilnius, Lithuania
17:30 EEST (UTC+3)		Report (FIFA)		Stadium: Avia Solutions Group Arena; Attendance: 1,629; Referee: Mohamed Hassan Ahmed Youssef Egypt)

30 September 2021 FIFA Futsal World Cup Semi-finals	Portugal	2–2 (a.e.t.) (4–3 p)	Kazakhstan	Kaunas, Lithuania
20:00 EEST (UTC+3)		Report (FIFA)		Stadium: Žalgiris Arena; Attendance: 2,052; Referee: Nikola Jelić Croatia)

3 October 2021 FIFA Futsal World Cup Final	Argentina	1–2	Portugal	Kaunas, Lithuania
20:00 EEST (UTC+3)		Report (FIFA)		Stadium: Žalgiris Arena; Referee: Nurdin Bukuev (Kyrgyzstan)

== Players ==
=== Current squad ===
The following players were called up for the 2026 Futsal Finalissima, held in Brazil from 6 to 8 November 2026.

Head coach: Jorge Braz

No.	Pos.	Player	Date of birth (age)	Caps	Goals	Club
1	GK	André Correia	17 February 1998 (age 28)			(Portuguese Football Federation) Benfica
12	GK	Bernardo Paçó	19 April 2000 (age 26)			(Portuguese Football Federation) Sporting CP
2	DF	André Coelho	30 October 1993 (age 33)			(Portuguese Football Federation) Benfica
3	DF	Tomás Paçó	19 April 2000 (age 26)			(Portuguese Football Federation) Sporting CP
4	DF	Afonso Jesus	6 January 1998 (age 28)			(Portuguese Football Federation) Benfica
6	MF	Rúben Teixeira	17 October 2003 (age 23)			(Portuguese Football Federation) Sporting CP
7	MF	Lúcio Rocha	5 May 2004 (age 22)			(Portuguese Football Federation) Benfica
8	MF	Silvestre Ferreira	5 May 1999 (age 27)			(Portuguese Football Federation) Benfica
9	MF	Diogo Santos	7 November 2002 (age 24)			(Portuguese Football Federation) Sporting CP
10	MF	Pauleta	12 June 1994 (age 32)			(Italian Football Federation) Napoli Futsal
11	MF	Pany Varela	25 February 1989 (age 37)			(Portuguese Football Federation) Benfica
14	MF	Edmilson Kutchy	12 October 2002 (age 24)			(Portuguese Football Federation) Benfica
5	FW	Hugo Neves	5 May 2000 (age 26)			(Italian Football Federation) Napoli Futsal
13	FW	Rúben Góis	13 September 2001 (age 25)			(Portuguese Football Federation) Benfica

=== Recent call-ups ===
The following players have also been called up to the Portugal national team since the 2024 FIFA Futsal World Cup.

Pos.	Player	Date of birth (age)	Caps	Goals	Club	Latest call-up
GK	Diogo Basílio	10 October 1996 (age 30)	5	0	(Portugal) Eléctrico	v. Romania, 21 October 2026
GK	Guilherme Cintra	2 July 2005 (age 21)			(Portugal) Leões de Porto Salvo	v. Romania, 21 October 2026
GK	Edu Sousa	19 August 1996 (age 30)	58	2	(Spain) ElPozo Murcia	v. Spain, 7 February 2026
GK	Cristiano Marques	29 August 1996 (age 30)	1	0	(France) Montpellier Méditerranée Futsal	v. Netherlands, 18 December 2024
DF	Erick Mendonça	21 July 1995 (age 31)	81	14	(Portugal) Sporting CP	v. Japan, 11 April 2026
DF	Bruno Maior	23 January 2004 (age 22)	4	1	(Portugal) Sporting CP	v. Japan, 11 April 2026
DF	Peixinho	24 November 2000 (age 25)	2	0	(Portugal) SC Braga	v. Japan, 11 April 2026
DF	Ricardo Lopes	26 February 2001 (age 25)	2	1	(Portugal) SC Braga	v. Morocco, 13 April 2025
DF	Gonçalo Sobral	10 April 1996 (age 30)	6	0	(Portugal) Q. Lombos	v. Morocco, 13 April 2025
DF	João Matos	21 February 1987 (age 39)	213	27	(Portugal) Retired	v. Netherlands, 12 March 2025^{RET}
DF	Tiago Sousa	6 April 1997 (age 29)	5	1	(Portugal) SC Braga	v. North Macedonia, 9 February 2025
MF	Célio Coque	1 May 2000 (age 26)	2	1	(Spain) Wanapix AD Sala 10	v. Japan, 11 April 2026
MF	Bruno Pinto	3 September 1993 (age 33)	4	0	(Portugal) Sporting CP	v. Japan, 11 April 2026
MF	Carlos Monteiro	21 August 2002 (age 24)	10	4	(Portugal) Benfica	v. Japan, 11 April 2026
MF	Tiago Brito	22 July 1991 (age 35)	142	37	(Portugal) SC Braga	v. Spain, 7 February 2026
MF	Bruno Coelho	1 August 1987 (age 39)	179	61	(Portugal) Retired	v. Spain, 7 February 2026^{RET}
MF	Mamadú Turé	12 June 1994 (age 32)	2	0	(Portugal) SC Braga	v. Morocco, 13 April 2025
MF	Tiago Macedo	3 July 2004 (age 22)	4	0	(Spain) Noia FS	v. Morocco, 13 April 2025
MF	Miguel Ângelo	2 February 1994 (age 32)	73	11	(Portugal) Rio Ave	v. North Macedonia, 9 February 2025
FW	Pedro Santos	2 February 2005 (age 21)	4	2	(Portugal) Leões de Porto Salvo	v. Croatia, September 2025
FW	Ludgero Lopes	17 August 1997 (age 29)	4	1	(Italy) L84 Torino	v. Morocco, 13 April 2025
FW	Zicky Té	1 September 2001 (age 25)	55	24	(Portugal) Sporting CP	v. Kazakhstan, 26 September 2024
^{INJ} Player withdrew from the squad due to an injury.^{RET} Retired from international futsal.

== Records ==
As of matches played 27 February 2021

Players in bold are still active for the national team.

=== Most appearances ===
Rank	Player	Caps	First Cap	Last Cap
1	**João Matos**	213	25-11-2008	12-03-2025
2	Arnaldo Pereira	208	23-12-1999	08-02-2016
3	Ricardinho	188	26-06-2003	07-04-2022
4	João Benedito	181	18-11-2000	08-02-2014
5	**Bruno Coelho**	179	13-04-2011	13-04-2025
6	Gonçalo Alves	171	22-10-2001	08-02-2014
7	Pedro Cary	159	22-01-2008	03-10-2021
8	Joel Queirós	143	24-04-2002	28-10-2014
9	**Tiago Brito**	142	12-12-2012	13-04-2025
10	Bebé	137	22-11-2005	03-10-2021

=== Top goalscorers ===
Rank	Player	Goals	Caps	Avg
1	Ricardinho	142	188	0.76
2	André Lima	107	111	0.96
2	Joel Queirós	107	143	0.75
4	Arnaldo Pereira	98	208	0.47
5	Fernando Cardinal	97	123	0.79
6	Gonçalo Alves	75	171	0.44
7	**Bruno Coelho**	61	179	0.34
8	Israel Alves	60	104	0.58
9	Pedro Costa	53	119	0.45
10	Ivan Dias	46	106	0.43

== Competitive record ==
A gold background colour indicates that Portugal won the tournament, a silver background colour indicates they were runner-up, a bronze background colour indicates a third place in the tournament, and a blue background indicates a fourth-place finish. A green border colour indicates that the tournament was hosted in Portugal.

=== FIFA Futsal World Cup ===
FIFA Futsal World Cup record
Year	Round	Pld	W	D	L	GF	GA
(Netherlands) 1989	Did not enter						
(Hong Kong) 1992	Did not qualify						
(Spain) 1996	Did not qualify						
(Guatemala) 2000	Third place	8	5	0	3	23	23
(Taiwan) 2004	Second round	6	3	1	2	18	8
(Brazil) 2008	First round	4	3	0	1	15	8
(Thailand) 2012	Quarter-finals	5	2	1	2	18	14
(Colombia) 2016	Fourth place	7	4	2	1	26	11
(Lithuania) 2021	Champions	7	5	2	0	26	12
(Uzbekistan) 2024	Round of 16	4	3	0	1	18	6
Total:7/10	1 Title	40	25	6	10	144	81

=== UEFA Futsal Championship ===
UEFA Futsal Championship record
Year	Round	Pld	W	D	L	GF	GA
(Spain) 1996	Did not qualify						
(Spain) 1999	Group stage	3	0	2	1	4	6
(Russia) 2001	Did not qualify						
(Italy) 2003	Group stage	3	1	1	1	10	12
(Czech Republic) 2005	Group stage	3	1	0	2	9	14
(Portugal) 2007	Fourth place	5	2	1	2	13	7
(Hungary) 2010	Runners-up	5	1	2	2	12	14
(Croatia) 2012	Quarter-finals	3	2	0	1	7	5
(Belgium) 2014	Fourth place	5	2	1	2	18	17
(Serbia) 2016	Quarter-finals	3	1	0	2	9	11
(Slovenia) 2018	Champions	5	5	0	0	23	9
(Netherlands) 2022	Champions	6	6	0	0	19	9
(Latvia) (Lithuania) (Slovenia) 2026	Runners-up	6	5	0	1	29	13
Total:11/13	2 Titles	47	24	7	14	153	117

=== Futsal Finalissima ===
Futsal Finalissima record
Year	Round	Pld	W	D	L	GF	GA
(Argentina) 2022	Champions	2	1	1	0	3	2
Total:1/1	1 Title	2	1	1	0	3	2

=== FIFUSA/AMF Futsal World Cup ===
AMF Futsal World Cup record
Year	Round	Pld	W	D	L	GF	GA
(Brazil) 1982	did not enter						
(Spain) 1985	Second round	?	?	?	?	?	?
(Australia) 1988	Fourth place	8	3	2	3	23	18
(Italy) 1991	Champions	?	?	?	?	?	?
(Argentina) 1994	Second round	6	3	0	3	13	12
(Mexico) 1997	Second round	?	?	?	?	?	?
(Bolivia) 2000	did not enter						
(Paraguay) 2003	did not enter						
(Argentina) 2007	did not enter						
(Colombia) 2011	did not enter						
(Belarus) 2015	did not enter						
(Argentina) 2019	did not enter						
Total	5/12	?	?	?	?	?	?

=== Grand Prix de Futsal ===
Grand Prix de Futsal record
Year	Round	Pld	W	D	L	GF	GA
Brazil 2005	did not enter						
Brazil 2006	did not enter						
Brazil 2007	did not enter						
Brazil 2008	did not enter						
Brazil 2009	did not enter						
Brazil 2010	Sixth place	6	3	0	3	10	13
Brazil 2011	did not enter						
Brazil 2013	did not enter						
Brazil 2014	did not enter						
Brazil 2015	did not enter						
Total	1/11	6	3	0	3	10	13

=== Confederations Cup ===
Futsal Confederations Cup record
Year	Round	Pld	W	D*	L	GS	GA
Libya 2009	did not enter	-	-	-	-	-	-
Brazil 2013	did not enter	-	-	-	-	-	-
Kuwait 2014	did not enter	-	-	-	-	-	-
Total	1/3	0	0	0	0	0	0

=== Futsal Mundialito ===
Futsal Mundialito record
Year	Round	Pld	W	D	L	GF	GA
Italy 1994	did not enter						
Brazil 1995	did not enter						
Brazil 1996	did not enter						
Brazil 1998	did not enter						
Brazil 2001	Third place	4	2	1	1	8	6
Italy 2002	did not enter						
Portugal 2006	Champions	4	4	0	0	31	3
Portugal 2007	Champions	4	4	0	0	23	6
Portugal 2008	Champions	4	4	0	0	34	1
Total	4/9	16	14	1	1	96	16

Note: Draws include knockout matches decided on penalty kicks.
