= AR Freixieiro =

- Full name: Associação Recreativa de Freixieiro
- Ground: Pavilhão do Centro de Congressos de Matosinhos; Matosinhos, Portugal.
- Chairman: Mário Valente da Silva Brito
- Manager: Miguel Mota
- League: II Divisão Futsal; Series B
- 2017–18: II Divisão Futsal; Series B: 6th Relegation League B: 6th
Home colours

Associação Recreativa de Freixieiro is a professional futsal team based in Matosinhos, Portugal. It plays in the II Divisão Futsal.

== Honours ==
International

- Futsal European Clubs Championship:
  - Runner-up (1): 1990–91
- European Futsal Cup Winners Cup:
  - Runner-up (1): 2003–04

National

- Liga Portuguesa de Futsal:
  - Winner (1): 2001–02
- Taça de Portugal de Futsal:
  - Runner-up (2): 1999–2000, 2002–03
- SuperTaça de Futsal de Portugal:
  - Winner (1): 2002
  - Runner-up (1): 2003
