= 2016 FIFA Futsal World Cup =

Copa Mundial de Fútbol Sala de la FIFA (Spanish) Colombia 2016

Tournament details
- Host country: Colombia
- Dates: 10 September – 1 October
- Teams: 24 (from 6 confederations)
- Venues: 3 (in 3 host cities)

Final positions
- Champions: Argentina (1st title)
- Runners-up: Russia
- Third place: Iran
- Fourth place: Portugal

Tournament statistics
- Matches played: 52
- Goals scored: 352 (6.77 per match)
- Attendance: 139,307 (2,679 per match)
- Top scorer: (Portugal) Ricardinho (12 goals)
- Best player: (Argentina) Fernando Wilhelm
- Best goalkeeper: (Argentina) Nicolás Sarmiento
- Fair play award: Vietnam

The 2016 FIFA Futsal World Cup was the eighth FIFA Futsal World Cup, the quadrennial international futsal championship contested by the men's national teams of the member associations of FIFA. The tournament was held in Colombia from 10 September to 1 October 2016.

Brazil and Spain, the two teams that won all seven previous tournaments, were eliminated in the round of 16 and quarter-finals respectively. Their elimination makes this tournament was the first in which the champions was neither of them.

Argentina defeated Russia 5–4 in the final to win the tournament; becoming only the third country to win a FIFA Futsal World Cup title.

== Host selection ==
Two countries bid for the tournament:

- Colombia
- Czech Republic

Four countries withdrew their bids:

- France
- Iran
- Puerto Rico
- Spain

The FIFA Executive Committee announced on 28 May 2013 that Colombia was appointed as host of the tournament.

== Qualified teams ==
A total of 24 teams qualify for the final tournament. In addition to Colombia who qualified automatically as hosts, the other 23 teams qualify from six separate continental competitions. FIFA ratified the distribution of spots at the executive committee meeting in March 2014.

Confederation	Competition	Date	Venue	Berths	Qualifier(s)
AFC (Asia)	2016 AFC Futsal Championship	10–21 February 2016	Uzbekistan	5	Australia; Iran; Thailand; Uzbekistan^{1} Vietnam^{1}
CAF (Africa)	2016 Africa Futsal Cup of Nations	15–24 April 2016	South Africa	3	Egypt; Morocco; Mozambique^{1}
CONCACAF (North, Central America & Caribbean)	2016 CONCACAF Futsal Championship	8–14 May 2016	Costa Rica	4	Costa Rica; Cuba; Guatemala; Panama
CONMEBOL (South America)	Host nation			1	Colombia
CONMEBOL (South America)	2016 FIFA Futsal World Cup qualification (CONMEBOL)	5–13 February 2016	Paraguay	3	Argentina; Brazil; Paraguay
OFC (Oceania)	2016 OFC Futsal Championship	8–13 February 2016	Fiji	1	Solomon Islands
UEFA (Europe)	2016 FIFA Futsal World Cup qualification (UEFA)	22 October 2015 – 13 April 2016	Various	7	Azerbaijan^{1} Italy; Kazakhstan^{2} Portugal; Russia; Spain; Ukraine
Total				24	

1.Teams that made their debut.
2.Kazakhstan's last appearance was when it was a member of the AFC

== Venues ==
Colombia presented the cities of Bogotá, Villavicencio, Bucaramanga, Cúcuta, Ibagué and Neiva as host cities when they bid to host the tournament. After an inspection meeting in October 2014, four stadiums were confirmed, with Neiva allowed an extension to finish works, before being removed as a venue later that month.

Confirmation of the four host cities were presented to the Colombian Football Federation and FIFA on 11 November. Medellín then replaced Villavicencio. A further inspection in January 2016 saw the removal of Ibagué as a host, meaning half of the cities in the initial bids proposal are confirmed, with the three remaining cites scheduled to accommodate two groups per stadia.

Cali	Bucaramanga	Medellín
Coliseo El Pueblo	Coliseo Bicentenario	Coliseo Iván de Bedout
Capacity: 12,000	Capacity: 7,600	Capacity: 6,000
2016 FIFA Futsal World Cup is located in Colombia

== Emblem ==
The official emblem was unveiled on 29 September 2015.

== Mascot ==
The official mascot, a spectacled bear, was launched on 19 April 2016.

== Draw ==
The official draw was held on 19 May 2016, 18:00 COT (UTC−5), at the Plaza Mayor Conference Centre in Medellín. The teams were seeded based on their performances in previous FIFA Futsal World Cups and confederation tournaments, with the hosts Colombia automatically seeded and assigned to position A1. Moreover, for ticket sales reasons, the hosts and the top two teams (Colombia, Brazil and Spain) were spread across the three venues for the group matches: Cali (Groups A and C), Medellín (Groups B and F) and Bucaramanga (Groups D and E). Teams of the same confederation could not meet in the group stage, except that there were one group with two UEFA teams.

Pot 1	Pot 2	Pot 3	Pot 4
Colombia; Brazil; Spain; Italy; Argentina; Russia	Iran; Ukraine; Portugal; Paraguay; Egypt; Costa Rica	Solomon Islands; Thailand; Morocco; Panama; Guatemala; Australia	Cuba; Mozambique; Kazakhstan; Azerbaijan; Uzbekistan; Vietnam

== Match officials ==
The following officials were chosen for the tournament.

Confederation	Referees
AFC	(United Arab Emirates) Khamis Hassan Al Shamsi
AFC	(Iran) Vahid Arzpeyma Mohammreh
AFC	(Kyrgyzstan) Nurdin Bukuev
AFC	(Australia) Chris Colley
AFC	(Japan) Tomohiro Kozaki
AFC	(China) Liu Jianqiao
AFC	(Philippines) Rey Ritaga
AFC	(Vietnam) Trương Quốc Dũng
CAF	(Senegal) Adalbert Diouf
CAF	(Egypt) Mohamed Hassan Hassan Ahmed Youssef
CAF	(Morocco) Khalid Hnich
CAF	(Angola) José Francisco Katemo Katchingavisa
CAF	(Cameroon) Theodore Yves Eyebe Messoa (support)
CONCACAF	(Cuba) Sergio Cabrera
CONCACAF	(Costa Rica) Ronny Castro Zumbado
CONCACAF	(El Salvador) Jorge Flores
CONCACAF	(Guatemala) Carlos González
CONCACAF	(Mexico) Francisco Rivera
CONCACAF	(United States) Lance Vanhaitsma

Confederation	Referees
CONMEBOL	(Chile) Cristian Espindola
CONMEBOL	(Colombia) Yuri García
CONMEBOL	(Ecuador) José Hernández
CONMEBOL	(Peru) Cesar Malaga
CONMEBOL	(Paraguay) Elvis Peña
CONMEBOL	(Uruguay) Daniel Rodríguez
CONMEBOL	(Argentina) Dario Santamaria
CONMEBOL	(Brazil) Gean Telles
CONMEBOL	(Bolivia) Henry Gutiérrez (support)
OFC	(Solomon Islands) Rex Kamusu
OFC	(New Zealand) Chris Sinclair
UEFA	(England) Marc Birkett
UEFA	(Czech Republic) Ondřej Černý
UEFA	(Turkey) Kamil Çetin
UEFA	(Portugal) Eduardo Fernandes
UEFA	(Spain) Fernando Gutiérrez
UEFA	(Belgium) Pascal Lemal
UEFA	(Italy) Alessandro Malfer
UEFA	(France) Cédric Pelissier
UEFA	(Romania) Bogdan Sorescu
UEFA	(Croatia) Saša Tomić

== Squads ==
Each team must name a squad of 14 players (two of whom must be goalkeepers) by the FIFA deadline. The official squads were announced by FIFA on 2 September 2016.

== Group stage ==
The match schedule was officially confirmed on 5 February 2016, a week after the removal of Ibagué from the host cities.

The top two teams of each group and the four best third-placed teams advance to the round of 16.

Tiebreakers

The rankings of teams in each group are determined as follows:

1. points obtained in all group matches;
2. goal difference in all group matches;
3. number of goals scored in all group matches;

If two or more teams are equal on the basis of the above three criteria, their rankings are determined as follows:

4. points obtained in the group matches between the teams concerned;
5. goal difference in the group matches between the teams concerned;
6. number of goals scored in the group matches between the teams concerned;
7. drawing of lots by the FIFA Organising Committee.

All times are local, COT (UTC−5).

=== Group A ===
Pos	Team	Pld	W	D	L	GF	GA	GD	Pts	Qualification
1	Portugal	3	2	1	0	15	2	+13	7	Knockout stage
2	Colombia (H)	3	1	2	0	8	7	+1	5	Knockout stage
3	Panama	3	1	0	2	6	14	−8	3	
4	Uzbekistan	3	0	1	2	5	11	−6	1	

Source: FIFA
Rules for classification: Group stage tiebreakers
(H) Hosts
10 September 2016
18:00

Uzbekistan	1–3	Panama
Anorov 39'	Report	Castrellón 16'; De León 30'; Mena 36'

Coliseo El Pueblo, Cali
Attendance: 7,352
Referee: Mohamed Hassan Hassan Ahmed Youssef (Egypt)
10 September 2016
20:00

Colombia	1–1	Portugal
Angellot 1'	Report	Cardinal 40'

Coliseo El Pueblo, Cali
Attendance: 10,084
Referee: Fernando Gutiérrez Lumbreras (Spain)

13 September 2016
18:00

Panama	0–9	Portugal
	Report	Ricardinho 1', 8', 11', 17', 17', 22'; Cardinal 5', 10'; Miguel Ângelo 18'

Coliseo El Pueblo, Cali
Attendance: 2,774
Referee: Cédric Pelissier (France)
13 September 2016
20:00

Colombia	3–3	Uzbekistan
Abril 18'; Angellot 37', 40'	Report	Anorov 5'; Irsaliev 15'; Elibaev 28'

Coliseo El Pueblo, Cali
Attendance: 6,610
Referee: Ondřej Černý (Czech Republic)

16 September 2016
20:00

Panama	3–4	Colombia
Brown 9'; Castrellón 28'; Mena 37'	Report	Angellot 4'; Toro 12'; Abril 22'; C. Reyes 34'

Coliseo El Pueblo, Cali
Attendance: 9,730
Referee: Saša Tomić (Croatia)
16 September 2016
20:00

Portugal	5–1	Uzbekistan
Ricardinho 10', 14', 22'; André Coelho 26'; Djô 35'	Report	Ricardinho 11' (o.g.)

Coliseo Iván de Bedout, Medellín
Attendance: 2,032
Referee: Daniel Rodríguez (Uruguay)

=== Group B ===
Pos	Team	Pld	W	D	L	GF	GA	GD	Pts	Qualification
1	Russia	3	3	0	0	19	6	+13	9	Knockout stage
2	Thailand	3	2	0	1	14	12	+2	6	Knockout stage
3	Egypt	3	1	0	2	9	9	0	3	Knockout stage
4	Cuba	3	0	0	3	7	22	−15	0	

Source: FIFA
Rules for classification: Group stage tiebreakers
10 September 2016
16:00

Cuba	1–7	Egypt
Marrero 31'	Report	El-Ashwal 1'; Eid 8', 31', 33'; Mizo 11'; Homos 18'; Nader 23'

Coliseo Iván de Bedout, Medellín
Attendance: 750
Referee: Kamil Çetin (Turkey)
10 September 2016
18:00

Thailand	4–6	Russia
Suphawut 19'; Jirawat 22'; Apiwat 22'; Jetsada 34'	Report	Davydov 12'; Eder Lima 16', 18', 26'; Niyazov 25'; Shayakhmetov 26' (pen.)

Coliseo Iván de Bedout, Medellín
Attendance: 1,043
Referee: Cristian Espindola (Chile)

13 September 2016
18:00

Egypt	1–6	Russia
Mizo 36'	Report	Davydov 1'; Eder Lima 2', 21'; Rômulo 6', 31'; Niyazov 18'

Coliseo Iván de Bedout, Medellín
Attendance: 457
Referee: Nurdin Bukuev (Kyrgyzstan)
13 September 2016
20:00

Thailand	8–5	Cuba
Wiwat 14'; Jirawat 15', 24'; Suphawut 20', 33', 40'; Jetsada 26'; Kritsada 28'	Report	Domínguez 6', 25'; Baquero 8'; Marrero 12'; Marino 19'

Coliseo Iván de Bedout, Medellín
Attendance: 757
Referee: Adalbert Diouf (Senegal)

16 September 2016
18:00

Egypt	1–2	Thailand
El-Ashwal 37'	Report	Eika 6' (o.g.); Jirawat 23'

Coliseo Iván de Bedout, Medellín
Attendance: 842
Referee: Kamil Çetin (Turkey)
16 September 2016
18:00

Russia	7–1	Cuba
Davydov 16'; Chishkala 18'; Niyazov 18'; Shayakhmetov 20'; Lyskov 32'; Milovanov 33'; Abramovich 36'	Report	Hernández 30'

Coliseo El Pueblo, Cali
Attendance: 2,141
Referee: Khamis Hassan Al Shamsi (United Arab Emirates)

=== Group C ===
Pos	Team	Pld	W	D	L	GF	GA	GD	Pts	Qualification
1	Italy	3	3	0	0	11	3	+8	9	Knockout stage
2	Paraguay	3	2	0	1	17	9	+8	6	Knockout stage
3	Vietnam	3	1	0	2	5	11	−6	3	Knockout stage
4	Guatemala	3	0	0	3	7	17	−10	0	

Source: FIFA
Rules for classification: Group stage tiebreakers
11 September 2016
18:00

Vietnam	4–2	Guatemala
Nguyễn Minh Trí 20', 29', 29'; Trần Văn Vũ 40' (pen.)	Report	Wanderley 24'; Patrick 31'

Coliseo El Pueblo, Cali
Attendance: 1,615
Referee: Bogdan Sorescu (Romania)
11 September 2016
20:00

Paraguay	2–4	Italy
J. Salas 8', 19'	Report	Lima 16'; Romano 23'; C. dos Santos 25'; Merlim 32'

Coliseo El Pueblo, Cali
Attendance: 2,220
Referee: Sergio Cabrera (Cuba)

14 September 2016
18:00

Guatemala	1–5	Italy
Romano 8' (o.g.)	Report	Fortino 3', 19', 32'; Leggiero 4', 34'

Coliseo El Pueblo, Cali
Attendance: 1,048
Referee: Daniel Rodriguez (Uruguay)
14 September 2016
20:00

Paraguay	7–1	Vietnam
F. Martínez 3'; J. Salas 11'; E. Ayala 12'; Trần Long Vũ 13' (o.g.); Villalba 18'; Rejala 34'; Pedrozo 39'	Report	Trần Văn Vũ 40'

Coliseo El Pueblo, Cali
Attendance: 2,193
Referee: Saša Tomić (Croatia)

17 September 2016
18:00

Guatemala	4–8	Paraguay
Arévalo 2'; Enríquez 3'; Mansilla 34'; González 39'	Report	E. Ayala 17', 18', 24'; Rejala 19'; Pedrozo 27'; Morel 35'; H. Martínez 36'; Franco 40'

Coliseo El Pueblo, Cali
Attendance: 4,123
Referee: Pascal Lemal (Belgium)
17 September 2016
18:00

Italy	2–0	Vietnam
Lima 5'; Murilo 27'	Report

Coliseo Bicentenario, Bucaramanga
Attendance: 1,374
Referee: José Francisco Katemo Katchingavisa (Angola)

=== Group D ===
Pos	Team	Pld	W	D	L	GF	GA	GD	Pts	Qualification
1	Brazil	3	3	0	0	29	5	+24	9	Knockout stage
2	Ukraine	3	2	0	1	8	6	+2	6	Knockout stage
3	Australia	3	1	0	2	5	16	−11	3	
4	Mozambique	3	0	0	3	7	22	−15	0	

Source: FIFA
Rules for classification: Group stage tiebreakers
11 September 2016
16:00

Mozambique	2–3	Australia
Calo 32'; Dino 35'	Report	Barrientos 11'; Cooper 18'; G. Giovenali 19'

Coliseo Bicentenario, Bucaramanga
Attendance: 2,014
Referee: Carlos Gonzalez (Guatemala)
11 September 2016
18:00

Ukraine	1–3	Brazil
Mykh. Grytsyna 26'	Report	Rodrigo 7'; Falcão 10'; Sorokin 35' (o.g.)

Coliseo Bicentenario, Bucaramanga
Attendance: 4,443
Referee: Nurdin Bukuev (Kyrgyzstan)

14 September 2016
18:00

Australia	1–11	Brazil
G. Giovenali 4'	Report	Rodrigo 2'; Fernandinho 8', 26'; Falcão 12', 23', 39'; Bateria 19'; Dieguinho 25', 40'; Jé 28'; Lockhart 39' (o.g.)

Coliseo Bicentenario, Bucaramanga
Attendance: 2,678
Referee: Marc Birkett (England)
14 September 2016
20:00

Ukraine	4–2	Mozambique
Sorokin 1'; Mykh. Grytsyna 8'; Ovsyannikov 25'; Koval 37'	Report	Dino 19'; Calo 19'

Coliseo Bicentenario, Bucaramanga
Attendance: 3,464
Referee: Rex Kamusu (Solomon Islands)

17 September 2016
16:00

Australia	1–3	Ukraine
Zeballos 38'	Report	Zhurba 7'; Bondar 35'; Ovsyannikov 40'

Coliseo Bicentenario, Bucaramanga
Attendance: 876
Referee: Francisco Rivera (Mexico)
17 September 2016
16:00

Brazil	15–3	Mozambique
Rodrigo 1', 7'; Xuxa 2', 12'; Dieguinho 13', 14'; Jackson 16'; Fernandinho 19', 30'; Bateria 29'; Ari 29', 32'; Falcão 35' (pen.), 37', 38'	Report	Mário 16' (pen.); Magu 30'; Dino 38'

Coliseo El Pueblo, Cali
Attendance: 3,567
Referee: Rex Kamusu (Solomon Islands)

=== Group E ===
Pos	Team	Pld	W	D	L	GF	GA	GD	Pts	Qualification
1	Argentina	3	2	1	0	10	5	+5	7	Knockout stage
2	Kazakhstan	3	2	0	1	13	2	+11	6	Knockout stage
3	Costa Rica	3	1	1	1	7	7	0	4	Knockout stage
4	Solomon Islands	3	0	0	3	5	21	−16	0	

Source: FIFA
Rules for classification: Group stage tiebreakers
12 September 2016
18:00

Solomon Islands	2–4	Costa Rica
Ragomo 36' (pen.); Bule 39'	Report	Paniagua 19', 33' (pen.); Chavés 24'; Brenes 37'

Coliseo Bicentenario, Bucaramanga
Attendance: 752
Referee: Elvis Peña (Paraguay)
12 September 2016
20:00

Argentina	1–0	Kazakhstan
A. Vaporaki 20'	Report

Coliseo Bicentenario, Bucaramanga
Attendance: 1,794
Referee: Chris Colley (Australia)

15 September 2016
18:00

Costa Rica	1–3	Kazakhstan
Paniagua 15'	Report	Douglas Jr. 1'; Taku 16'; Leo Jaraguá 21'

Coliseo Bicentenario, Bucaramanga
Attendance: 903
Referee: Cristian Espindola (Chile)
15 September 2016
20:00

Argentina	7–3	Solomon Islands
Brandi 3'; Basile 9'; Borruto 11', 20', 28'; Taborda 14'; A. Vaporaki 31'	Report	Bule 6'; Makau 12'; Ragomo 23'

Coliseo Bicentenario, Bucaramanga
Attendance: 2,111
Referee: Lance Vanhaitsma (United States)

18 September 2016
16:00

Costa Rica	2–2	Argentina
Cordero 19'; Cubillo 30'	Report	Basile 31'; Wilhelm 35'

Coliseo Bicentenario, Bucaramanga
Attendance: 1,959
Referee: Eduardo Fernandes (Portugal)
18 September 2016
16:00

Kazakhstan	10–0	Solomon Islands
Dovgan 4'; Knaub 9', 22'; Douglas Jr. 16', 29'; Leo Jaraguá 18'; Taku 28', 30'; Mun 29'; Pengrin 38'	Report

Coliseo Iván de Bedout, Medellín
Attendance: 727
Referee: Tomohiro Kozaki (Japan)

=== Group F ===
Pos	Team	Pld	W	D	L	GF	GA	GD	Pts	Qualification
1	Spain	3	3	0	0	13	6	+7	9	Knockout stage
2	Azerbaijan	3	1	1	1	10	7	+3	4	Knockout stage
3	Iran	3	1	1	1	9	11	−2	4	Knockout stage
4	Morocco	3	0	0	3	6	14	−8	0	

Source: FIFA
Rules for classification: Group stage tiebreakers
12 September 2016
18:00

Morocco	0–5	Azerbaijan
	Report	Vassoura 15', 18', 33'; Gallo 29'; Bolinha 31'

Coliseo Iván de Bedout, Medellín
Attendance: 1,016
Referee: José Francisco Katemo Katchingavisa (Angola)
12 September 2016
20:00

Iran	1–5	Spain
Hassanzadeh 28' (pen.)	Report	Lozano 1'; José Ruiz 7'; Aicardo 17' (pen.), 33'; Miguelín 27'

Coliseo Iván de Bedout, Medellín
Attendance: 1,980
Referee: Cesar Malaga (Peru)

15 September 2016
18:00

Azerbaijan	2–4	Spain
Vassoura 3'; Bolinha 40'	Report	Vassoura 5', 14' (o.g.); Fernandão 27'; Miguelín 36'

Coliseo Iván de Bedout, Medellín
Attendance: 1,221
Referee: Alessandro Malfer (Italy)
15 September 2016
20:00

Iran	5–3	Morocco
Tayyebi 10'; Javid 15'; Hassanzadeh 16', 24'; Tavakoli 18'	Report	Jouad 16'; Habil 19' (pen.), 33'

Coliseo Iván de Bedout, Medellín
Attendance: 1,509
Referee: Sergio Cabrera (Cuba)

18 September 2016
18:00

Azerbaijan	3–3	Iran
Bolinha 2'; Gallo 22', 32'	Report	Esmaeilpour 1'; Tavakoli 21'; Tayyebi 36'

Coliseo Iván de Bedout, Medellín
Attendance: 1,108
Referee: Cesar Malaga (Peru)
18 September 2016
18:00

Spain	4–3	Morocco
Lozano 8', 33'; Aicardo 17'; Raúl Campos 19'	Report	Habil 14', 34'; El Mazray 24'

Coliseo Bicentenario, Bucaramanga
Attendance: 2,696
Referee: Yuri García (Colombia)

=== Ranking of third-placed teams ===
The four best teams among those ranked third are determined as follows:

1. points obtained in all group matches;
2. goal difference in all group matches;
3. number of goals scored in all group matches;
4. drawing of lots by the FIFA Organising Committee.

Pos	Grp	Team	Pld	W	D	L	GF	GA	GD	Pts	Qualification
1	E	Costa Rica	3	1	1	1	7	7	0	4	Knockout stage
2	F	Iran	3	1	1	1	9	11	−2	4	Knockout stage
3	B	Egypt	3	1	0	2	9	9	0	3	Knockout stage
4	C	Vietnam	3	1	0	2	5	11	−6	3	Knockout stage
5	A	Panama	3	1	0	2	6	14	−8	3	
6	D	Australia	3	1	0	2	5	16	−11	3	

Source: FIFA

== Knockout stage ==
In the knockout stages, if a match is level at the end of normal playing time, extra time shall be played (two periods of five minutes each) and followed, if necessary, by kicks from the penalty mark to determine the winner. However, for the third place match, no extra time shall be played and the winner shall be determined by kicks from the penalty mark.

Round of 16
20 September – Cali
Colombia	0 (2)
Paraguay (p)	0 (3)
21 September – Bucaramanga
Brazil	4 (2)
Iran (p)	4 (3)
20 September – Medellín
Russia	7
Vietnam	0
21 September – Medellín
Spain	5
Kazakhstan	2
22 September – Bucaramanga
Argentina (a.e.t.)	1
Ukraine	0
22 September – Cali
Italy	3
Egypt (a.e.t.)	4
22 September – Medellín
Thailand	8
Azerbaijan (a.e.t.)	13
21 September – Cali
Portugal	4
Costa Rica	0

Quarter-finals
24 September – Bucaramanga
Paraguay	3
Iran (a.e.t.)	4
24 September – Cali
Russia	6
Spain	2
25 September – Medellín
Argentina	5
Egypt	0
25 September – Cali
Azerbaijan	2
Portugal	3

Semi-finals
27 September – Medellín
Iran	3
Russia	4
28 September – Cali
Argentina	5
Portugal	2

Final
1 October – Cali
Russia	4
Argentina	5
Third place
1 October – Cali
Iran (p)	2 (4)
Portugal	2 (3)

Combinations of matches in the Round of 16

The specific match-ups involving the third-placed teams depend on which four third-placed teams qualified for the round of 16:

Combination according to the four qualified teams

Third-placed teams qualify from groups						1A (Portugal) vs	1B (Russia) vs	1C (Italy) vs	1D (Brazil) vs
A	B	C	D			3C	3D	3A	3B
A	B	C		E		3C	3A	3B	3E
A	B	C			F	3C	3A	3B	3F
A	B		D	E		3D	3A	3B	3E
A	B		D		F	3D	3A	3B	3F
A	B			E	F	3E	3A	3B	3F
A		C	D	E		3C	3D	3A	3E
A		C	D		F	3C	3D	3A	3F
A		C		E	F	3C	3A	3F	3E
A			D	E	F	3D	3A	3F	3E
	B	C	D	E		3C	3D	3B	3E
	B	C	D		F	3C	3D	3B	3F
	B	C		E	F	3E	3C	3B	3F
	B		D	E	F	3E	3D	3B	3F
		C	D	E	F	3C	3D	3F	3E

=== Round of 16 ===
20 September 2016
17:30

Russia	7–0	Vietnam
Chishkala 3'; Abramovich 10', 13'; Abramov 18'; Niyazov 22'; Rômulo 30'; Milovanov 37'	Report

Coliseo Iván de Bedout, Medellín
Attendance: 643
Referee: Jorge Flores (El Salvador)

20 September 2016
20:00

Colombia	0–0 (a.e.t.)	Paraguay
	Report
Penalties
Toro (penalty missed); Zúñiga (penalty scored); Duque (penalty scored); Otero (penalty missed)	2–3	(penalty missed) E. Ayala; (penalty scored) J. Salas; (penalty scored) A. Salas; (penalty scored) G. Ayala

Coliseo El Pueblo, Cali
Attendance: 5,988
Referee: Bogdan Sorescu (Romania)

21 September 2016
17:30

Brazil	4–4 (a.e.t.)	Iran
Falcão 9', 13', 48'; Dieguinho 29'	Report	Tayyebi 14'; Kazemi 31'; Hassanzadeh 37'; Keshavarz 48'
Penalties
Rodrigo (penalty scored); Ari (penalty missed); Falcão (penalty scored)	2–3	(penalty scored) Hassanzadeh; (penalty scored) Sangsefidi; (penalty scored) Esmaeilpour

Coliseo Bicentenario, Bucaramanga
Attendance: 1,576
Referee: Ondřej Černý (Czech Republic)

21 September 2016
17:30

Spain	5–2	Kazakhstan
Lozano 3'; Bebe 23'; Nurgozhin 32' (o.g.); Raúl Campos 39'; Miguelín 40'	Report	Yesenamanov 5'; Nurgozhin 31'

Coliseo Iván de Bedout, Medellín
Attendance: 985
Referee: Vahid Arzpeyma Mohammreh (Iran)

21 September 2016
20:00

Portugal	4–0	Costa Rica
Ricardinho 5', 22'; A. Coelho 26'; Brito 27'	Report

Coliseo El Pueblo, Cali
Attendance: 1,072
Referee: Khalid Hnich (Morocco)

22 September 2016
17:30

Argentina	1–0 (a.e.t.)	Ukraine
Cuzzolino 49' (pen.)	Report

Coliseo Bicentenario, Bucaramanga
Attendance: 866
Referee: Nurdin Bukuev (Kyrgyzstan)

22 September 2016
17:30

Thailand	8–13 (a.e.t.)	Azerbaijan
Suphawut 9', 13'; Kritsada 18', 19', 26'; Jirawat 22'; Jetsada 37', 45' (pen.)	Report	Vassoura 4', 44'; Fineo 6', 13', 44', 48', 49'; Borisov 14'; Bolinha 28', 29', 41'; Poletto 31'; Huseynli 49'

Coliseo Iván de Bedout, Medellín
Attendance: 838
Referee: Fernando Gutiérrez (Spain)

22 September 2016
20:00

Italy	3–4 (a.e.t.)	Egypt
Murilo 7', 35'; Ercolessi 20'	Report	El-Ashwal 7', 19', 48'; Essam 34'

Coliseo El Pueblo, Cali
Attendance: 1,125
Referee: Carlos González (Guatemala)

=== Quarter-finals ===
24 September 2016
15:30

Paraguay	3–4 (a.e.t.)	Iran
F. Martínez 13'; J. Salas 20'; Villalba 39'	Report	Esmaeilpour 16', 50'; Javid 23', 36'

Coliseo Bicentenario, Bucaramanga
Attendance: 2,155
Referee: Marc Birkett (England)

24 September 2016
18:00

Russia	6–2	Spain
Chishkala 3', 15'; Eder Lima 19', 31'; Fernandão 27' (o.g.); Gustavo 39'	Report	Rivillos 3'; Miguelín 6'

Coliseo El Pueblo, Cali
Attendance: 3,009
Referee: Gean Telles (Brazil)

25 September 2016
15:30

Argentina	5–0	Egypt
Taborda 12'; Stazzone 14'; Basile 28'; Cuzzolino 29'; Battistoni 34'	Report

Coliseo Iván de Bedout, Medellín
Attendance: 2,529
Referee: Alessandro Malfer (Italy)

25 September 2016
18:00

Azerbaijan	2–3	Portugal
Bolinha 13'; Eduardo 35'	Report	Djô 8'; João Matos 18'; Ricardinho 28'

Coliseo El Pueblo, Cali
Attendance: 2,974
Referee: Sergio Cabrera (Cuba)

=== Semi-finals ===
27 September 2016
19:00

Iran	3–4	Russia
Esmaeilpour 17'; Hassanzadeh 30'; Javid 40'	Report	Lyskov 14'; Abramov 23'; Shayakhmetov 30'; Chishkala 40'

Coliseo Iván de Bedout, Medellín
Attendance: 3,510
Referee: Nurdin Bukuev (Kyrgyzstan)

28 September 2016
19:00

Argentina	5–2	Portugal
Borruto 5'; Stazzone 11'; A. Vaporaki 12'; Brandi 13'; Cuzzolino 36'	Report	Ré 9'; Tiago Brito 37'

Coliseo El Pueblo, Cali
Attendance: 7,610
Referee: Ondřej Černý (Czech Republic)

=== Third place match ===
1 October 2016
12:00

Iran	2–2	Portugal
Kazemi 26'; Javid 36' (pen.)	Report	Cardinal 21', 21'
Penalties
Hassanzadeh (penalty scored); Taheri (penalty missed); Tayyebi (penalty scored); Kazemi (penalty scored); Ahmadi (penalty missed); Javid (penalty scored)	4–3	Cardinal (penalty scored); Tiago Brito (penalty missed); Ricardinho (penalty scored); Bruno Coelho (penalty scored); André Coelho (penalty missed); João Matos (penalty missed)

Coliseo El Pueblo, Cali
Attendance: 4,018
Referee: Alessandro Malfer (Italy)

=== Final ===
1 October 2016
14:30

Russia	4–5	Argentina
Eder Lima 16', 22', 40' (pen.); Lyskov 39'	Report	A. Vaporaki 16'; Cuzzolino 20' (pen.); Brandi 22', 23'; C. Vaporaki 39'

Coliseo El Pueblo, Cali
Attendance: 8,559
Referee: Fernando Gutiérrez Lumbreras (Spain)

Russia	Argentina

== Champions ==
2016 FIFA Futsal World Cup
Winners

Argentina
1st title

== Awards ==
The following awards were given for the tournament:

Golden Shoe winner	Golden Ball winner	Golden Glove winner
(Portugal) Ricardinho	(Argentina) Fernando Wilhelm	(Argentina) Nicolás Sarmiento
Silver Shoe winner	Silver Ball winner	FIFA Fair Play Trophy
(Russia) Eder Lima	(Russia) Eder Lima	Vietnam
Bronze Shoe winner	Bronze Ball winner	Goal of the Tournament
(Brazil) Falcão	(Iran) Ahmad Esmaeilpour	(Thailand) Suphawut Thueanklang

== Goalscorers ==
12 goals

- (Portugal) Ricardinho

10 goals

- (Russia) Eder Lima
- (Brazil) Falcão

7 goals

- (Azerbaijan) Bolinha

6 goals

- (Azerbaijan) Vassoura
- (Thailand) Suphawut Thueanklang

5 goals

- (Azerbaijan) Fineo
- (Brazil) Dieguinho
- (Egypt) Abdelrahman El-Ashwal
- (Iran) Ali Asghar Hassanzadeh
- (Iran) Mahdi Javid
- (Portugal) Fernando Cardinal
- (Russia) Ivan Chishkala
- (Thailand) Jirawat Sornwichian

4 goals

- (Argentina) Cristian Borruto
- (Argentina) Alan Brandi
- (Argentina) Leandro Cuzzolino
- (Argentina) Alamiro Vaporaki
- (Brazil) Fernandinho
- (Brazil) Rodrigo
- (Colombia) Angellot Caro
- (Iran) Ahmad Esmaeilpour
- (Morocco) Adil Habil
- (Paraguay) Enmanuel Ayala
- (Paraguay) Juan Salas
- (Russia) Artem Niyazov
- (Spain) Miguelín
- (Spain) Sergio Lozano
- (Thailand) Kritsada Wongkaeo
- (Thailand) Jetsada Chudech

3 goals

- (Argentina) Santiago Basile
- (Azerbaijan) Gallo
- (Costa Rica) Alejandro Paniagua
- (Egypt) Mostafa Eid
- (Iran) Hossein Tayyebi
- (Italy) Murilo Ferreira
- (Italy) Rodolfo Fortino
- (Kazakhstan) Douglas Júnior
- (Kazakhstan) Pavel Taku
- (Mozambique) Dino
- (Russia) Sergei Abramovich
- (Russia) Daniil Davydov
- (Russia) Dmitri Lyskov
- (Russia) Vladislav Shayakhmetov
- (Russia) Rômulo
- (Spain) Jesús Aicardo
- (Vietnam) Nguyễn Minh Trí

2 goals

- (Australia) Gregory Giovenali
- (Argentina) Damián Stazzone
- (Argentina) Pablo Taborda
- (Brazil) Ari
- (Brazil) Bateria
- (Brazil) Xuxa
- (Colombia) Jorge Abril
- (Cuba) Sandy Dominguez
- (Cuba) Alejandro Marrero
- (Egypt) Mizo
- (Iran) Farhad Tavakoli
- (Iran) Afshin Kazemi
- (Italy) Luca Leggiero
- (Italy) Gabriel Lima
- (Kazakhstan) Leo Jaraguá
- (Kazakhstan) Arnold Knaub
- (Mozambique) Calo
- (Panama) Abdiel Castrellón
- (Panama) Fernando Mena
- (Paraguay) Francisco Martínez
- (Paraguay) Juan Pedrozo
- (Paraguay) Richard Rejala
- (Paraguay) René Villalba
- (Portugal) Tiago Brito
- (Portugal) André Coelho
- (Portugal) Djô
- (Russia) Sergei Abramov
- (Russia) Ivan Milovanov
- (Solomon Islands) Jeffery Bule
- (Solomon Islands) Elliot Ragomo
- (Spain) Raúl Campos
- (Ukraine) Denys Ovsyannikov
- (Uzbekistan) Javlon Anorov
- (Vietnam) Trần Văn Vũ

1 goal

- (Australia) Jonathan Barrientos
- (Australia) Adam Cooper
- (Australia) Chris Zeballos
- (Argentina) Gerardo Battistoni
- (Argentina) Constantino Vaporaki
- (Argentina) Fernando Wilhelm
- (Azerbaijan) Vitaliy Borisov
- (Azerbaijan) Eduardo
- (Azerbaijan) Fabio Poletto
- (Azerbaijan) Rovshan Huseynli
- (Brazil) Jackson Samurai
- (Brazil) Jé
- (Colombia) Jhonatan Toro
- (Colombia) Andrés Reyes
- (Costa Rica) Juan Alonso Cordero
- (Costa Rica) Erick Brenes
- (Costa Rica) Carlos Chaves
- (Costa Rica) Edwin Cubillo
- (Cuba) Andy Baquero
- (Cuba) Karel Marino
- (Cuba) Daniel Hernandez
- (Egypt) Essam Alla
- (Egypt) Ahmed Homos
- (Egypt) Mostafa Nader
- (Guatemala) Jonatan Arévalo
- (Guatemala) Walter Enríquez
- (Guatemala) José González
- (Guatemala) José Mansilla
- (Guatemala) Patrick Ruiz
- (Guatemala) Wanderley Ruiz
- (Iran) Mohammad Keshavarz
- (Italy) Carlos dos Santos
- (Italy) Marco Ercolessi
- (Italy) Alex Merlim
- (Italy) Sergio Romano
- (Kazakhstan) Aleksandr Dovgan
- (Kazakhstan) Ilya Mun
- (Kazakhstan) Nikolai Pengrin
- (Kazakhstan) Chingiz Yesenamanov
- (Kazakhstan) Dauren Nurgozhin
- (Morocco) Youssef El Mazray
- (Morocco) Mohamed Jouad
- (Mozambique) Magu
- (Mozambique) Mário
- (Panama) Michael De León
- (Panama) Josue Brown
- (Paraguay) Enrique Franco
- (Paraguay) Hugo Martínez
- (Paraguay) Juan Morel
- (Portugal) Miguel Ângelo
- (Portugal) João Matos
- (Portugal) Ré
- (Russia) Gustavo
- (Solomon Islands) Coleman Makau
- (Spain) Bebe
- (Spain) Fernandão
- (Spain) José Ruiz
- (Spain) Rivillos
- (Thailand) Apiwat Chaemcharoen
- (Thailand) Wiwat Thaijaroen
- (Ukraine) Dmytro Bondar
- (Ukraine) Mykhailo Grytsyna
- (Ukraine) Mykola Grytsyna
- (Ukraine) Sergiy Koval
- (Ukraine) Oleksandr Sorokin
- (Ukraine) Serhiy Zhurba
- (Uzbekistan) Nodir Elibaev
- (Uzbekistan) Dilshod Irsaliev

Own goals
2 goals

- (Azerbaijan) Vassoura (playing against Spain)

1 goal

- (Australia) Dean Lockhart (playing against Brazil)
- (Egypt) Ibrahim Eika (playing against Thailand)
- (Italy) Sergio Romano (playing against Guatemala)
- (Kazakhstan) Dauren Nurgozhin (playing against Spain)
- (Portugal) Ricardinho (playing against Uzbekistan)
- (Spain) Fernandão (playing against Russia)
- (Thailand) Nattawut Madyalan (playing against Russia)
- (Ukraine) Oleksandr Sorokin (playing against Brazil)
- (Vietnam) Trần Long Vũ (playing against Paraguay)

== Tournament ranking ==
Per statistical convention in football, matches decided in extra time are counted as wins and losses, while matches decided by penalty shoot-out are counted as draws.

Pos	Team	Pld	W	D	L	GF	GA	GD	Pts	Final result
1	Argentina	7	6	1	0	26	11	+15	19	Champions
2	Russia	7	6	0	1	40	16	+24	18	Runners-up
3	Iran	7	2	3	2	22	24	–2	9	Third place
4	Portugal	7	4	2	1	26	11	+15	14	Fourth place
5	Spain	5	4	0	1	20	14	+6	12	Eliminated in Quarter-finals
6	Azerbaijan	5	2	1	2	25	18	+7	7	Eliminated in Quarter-finals
7	Paraguay	5	2	1	2	20	13	+7	7	Eliminated in Quarter-finals
8	Egypt	5	2	0	3	13	17	–4	6	Eliminated in Quarter-finals
9	Brazil	4	3	1	0	33	9	+24	10	Eliminated in Round of 16
10	Italy	4	3	0	1	14	7	+7	9	Eliminated in Round of 16
11	Kazakhstan	4	2	0	2	15	7	+8	6	Eliminated in Round of 16
12	Colombia	4	1	3	0	8	7	+1	6	Eliminated in Round of 16
13	Ukraine	4	2	0	2	8	7	+1	6	Eliminated in Round of 16
14	Thailand	4	2	0	2	22	25	–3	6	Eliminated in Round of 16
15	Costa Rica	4	1	1	2	7	11	–4	4	Eliminated in Round of 16
16	Vietnam	4	1	0	3	5	18	–13	3	Eliminated in Round of 16
17	Panama	3	1	0	2	6	14	–8	3	Eliminated in Group stage
18	Australia	3	1	0	2	5	16	–11	3	Eliminated in Group stage
19	Uzbekistan	3	0	1	2	5	11	–6	3	Eliminated in Group stage
20	Morocco	3	0	0	3	6	14	–8	0	Eliminated in Group stage
21	Guatemala	3	0	0	3	7	17	–10	0	Eliminated in Group stage
22	Cuba	3	0	0	3	7	22	–15	0	Eliminated in Group stage
23	Mozambique	3	0	0	3	7	22	–15	0	Eliminated in Group stage
24	Solomon Islands	3	0	0	3	5	21	–16	0	Eliminated in Group stage

== Broadcasting rights ==
=== Television ===
Territory	Channel	Ref
Argentina	Televisión Pública Argentina; TyC Sports	
Australia	SBS; Optus	
Austria	ORF	
Azerbaijan	İTV	
Brazil	Globo; Band (all matches of Brazil and some matches); SporTV (all matches)	
Bolivia	Tigo Sports	
Bulgaria	BNT	
Canada	TSN	
Caribbean (Note: The FIFA/DIRECTV deal covers the rights for 21 countries: Antigua & Barbuda, Anguilla, Aruba, Bahamas, Barbados, Belize, British Virgin Islands, Cayman Islands, Curaçao, Dominica, Grenada, Guyana, Haiti, Jamaica, Montserrat, St. Lucia, St. Kitts & Nevis, St. Vincent & the Grenadines, Suriname, Trinidad & Tobago and the Turks and Caicos.)	DIRECTV	
Central America (Note: The FIFA/SKY deal for the 2016 FIFA Futsal World Cup covers the rights for 7 countries: Costa Rica (Teletica), Dominican Republic, El Salvador, Guatemala (RTVG), Honduras, Nicaragua and Panama.)	SKY	
China	CCTV	
Colombia	Caracol Televisión; RCN Televisión	
Costa Rica	Teletica	
Cuba	Tele Rebelde	
Europe (Note: The FIFA/Eurosport deal covers the rights for 43 countries: Albania, Armenia, Austria, Azerbaijan (İTV), Belarus, Belgium, Bosnia-Herzegovina, Bulgaria, Croatia, Cyprus, Czech Republic, Denmark, Estonia, Finland, France, Georgia, Germany, Hungary, Iceland, Ireland, Israel, Italy (RAI), Kazakhstan (KAZsport), Kosovo, Latvia, Liechtenstein, Lithuania, Luxembourg, Macedonia, Malta, Moldova, Montenegro, Netherlands, Norway, Portugal (RTP), Romania, Russia (Match TV), San Marino, Serbia, Slovakia, Slovenia, Spain (GOL), Sweden, Switzerland, Ukraine (Ukrayina), the United Kingdom and the Vatican City)	Eurosport	
France	TF1 beIN Sports	
Georgia	GPB	
Guatemala	Radio y Televisión de Guatemala	
Hong Kong	TVB	
Lithuania	LRT	
Indian subcontinent (Note: The FIFA/Sony deal for the 2016 FIFA Futsal World Cup covers the rights for 8 countries: Afghanistan, Bangladesh, Bhutan, India, Maldives, Nepal, Pakistan and Sri Lanka)	Sony SIX; Sony ESPN	
Iran	IRIB TV3; IRIB Varzesh	
Italy	RAI	
Kazakhstan	KAZsport	
Macau	TDM	
Malaysia	Astro	
Mexico	SKY México; Televisa; Azteca; Cinépolis	
(Arab League) MENA (Note: The FIFA/beIN Sports Arabia deal covers the rights for 24 countries: Algeria, Bahrain, Comoros, Djibouti, Egypt, Iran (IRIB), Iraq, Jordan, Kuwait, Lebanon, Libya, Mauritania, Morocco, Oman, Palestine, Qatar, Saudi Arabia, Somalia, South Sudan, Sudan, Syria, Tunisia, United Arab Emirates and Yemen)	beIN Sports	
Montenegro	RTCG	
New Zealand	Sky Sport	
Oceania (Note: The FIFA/SBS deal covers the rights for 16 countries: American Samoa (Fox), Australia (Fox Sports), Cook Islands, Fiji, Kiribati, Micronesia, Nauru, Niue, Northern Mariana Islands (Fox), Palau, Papua New Guinea (Fox Sports), Samoa, Solomon Islands, Tonga, Tuvalu and Vanuatu)	SBS	
Panama	TVMax; TVN	
Paraguay	Paraguay TV; Tigo Sports	
Poland	Polsat	
Portugal	RTP	
Russia	Match TV	
South America (Note: The FIFA/DIRECTV deal for the 2016 FIFA Futsal World Cup covers the rights for 9 countries: Argentina (TVPA and TyC), Bolivia (Tigo), Chile, Colombia (Caracol and RCN), Ecuador (CNT), Paraguay (Paraguay TV and Tigo), Peru, Uruguay (VTV) and Venezuela)	DIRECTV	
Spain	GOL	
Thailand	BBTV	
Turkey	Show TV	
Ukraine	Ukrayina	
Uruguay	VTV	
United States	Fox Sports (English); Telemundo Deportes (Spanish)	
Uzbekistan	SportUZ; UzHD	
Vietnam	K+	

=== Radio ===
Territory	Channel	Ref
Argentina	ESPN 107.9 FM; Radio Continental; Radio La Red; Radio Nacional	
Australia	SBS Radio	
Brazil	Globo/CBN; Jovem Pan; Rádio Difusora	
Colombia	Antena 2 Bluradio; Caracol Radio; La FM; Q'Hubo Radio; Radioacktiva; RCN Radio	
Costa Rica	Radio Columbia; Radio Monumental	
Cuba	Radio Rebelde	
Guatemala	Emisoras Unidas; Radio Punto	
Italy	RAI	
Iran	IRIB Radio Varzesh	
Kazakhstan	Kazakh Radio	
Mexico	Televisa Deportes W W Radio affiliated stations	
Panama	RPC Radio	
Paraguay	La 970; Megacadena de Comunicación; ABC Cardinal; La Unión; Radio Uno; Monumental; Caritas; La Deportiva; Radio Nacional	
Portugal	RTP; Renascença; TSF	
Russia	VGTRK	
Spain	Cadena SER; COPE; Onda Cero; Radio Marca; RNE	
