= Medellín Sports Coliseum =

Sport coliseum in Colombia

- Coliseo de Deportes de Medellín
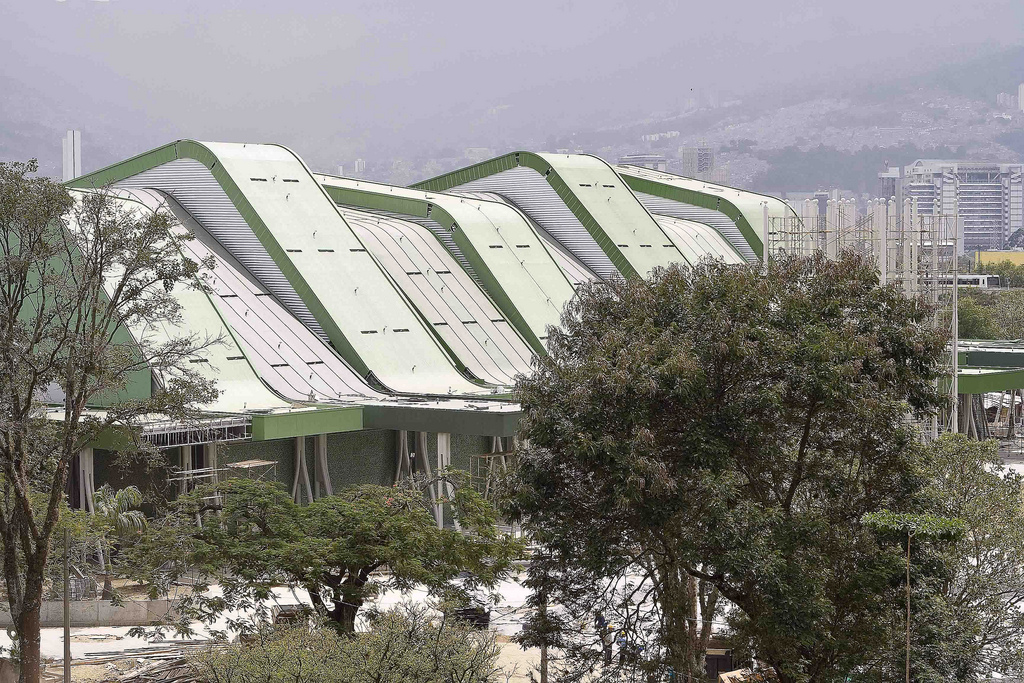
- Exterior view
- Interactive map of Medellín Sports Coliseum
- Location: Medellín, Colombia
- Coordinates: 6°15′24.48″N 75°35′24.62″W
- Owner: Mayoral of Medellín
- Operator: INDER Medellín
- Capacity: 6,000 (Iván de Beodut Coliseum)

Construction
- Built: 2009
- Opened: 2010
- Cost: CO$50 million
- Architects: Giancarlo Mazzanti; Felipe Mesa (Plan B Architects)
- Structural engineers: Nicolás Parra; Daniel Lozano (CNI Ingenieros)

Medellín Sports Coliseum (known in Spanish simply as the Coliseums (Spanish: Los Coliseos) or the Sport Coliseums (Spanish: Los Coliseos Deportivos), is a complex of five sports arenas located in Medellín, Colombia: the Guillermo Gaviria Correa Coliseum for Martial Arts, the Jorge Valderrama Coliseum for Handball, the Jorge Hugo Giraldo Coliseum for Gymnastics, the Iván de Beodut Coliseum for Basketball, and the Yesid Santos Coliseum for Volleyball. It is part of the larger Atanasio Girardot Sports Complex.

The five gymnasiums were designed by Giancarlo Mazzanti and Plan B Architects. Three coliseums were renovated and two new coliseums were constructed in 18 months and with CO$50 million in preparation for the 2010 South American Games. The design has a wavy sloped green roofline and an area of 493,000 square feet.

== History ==
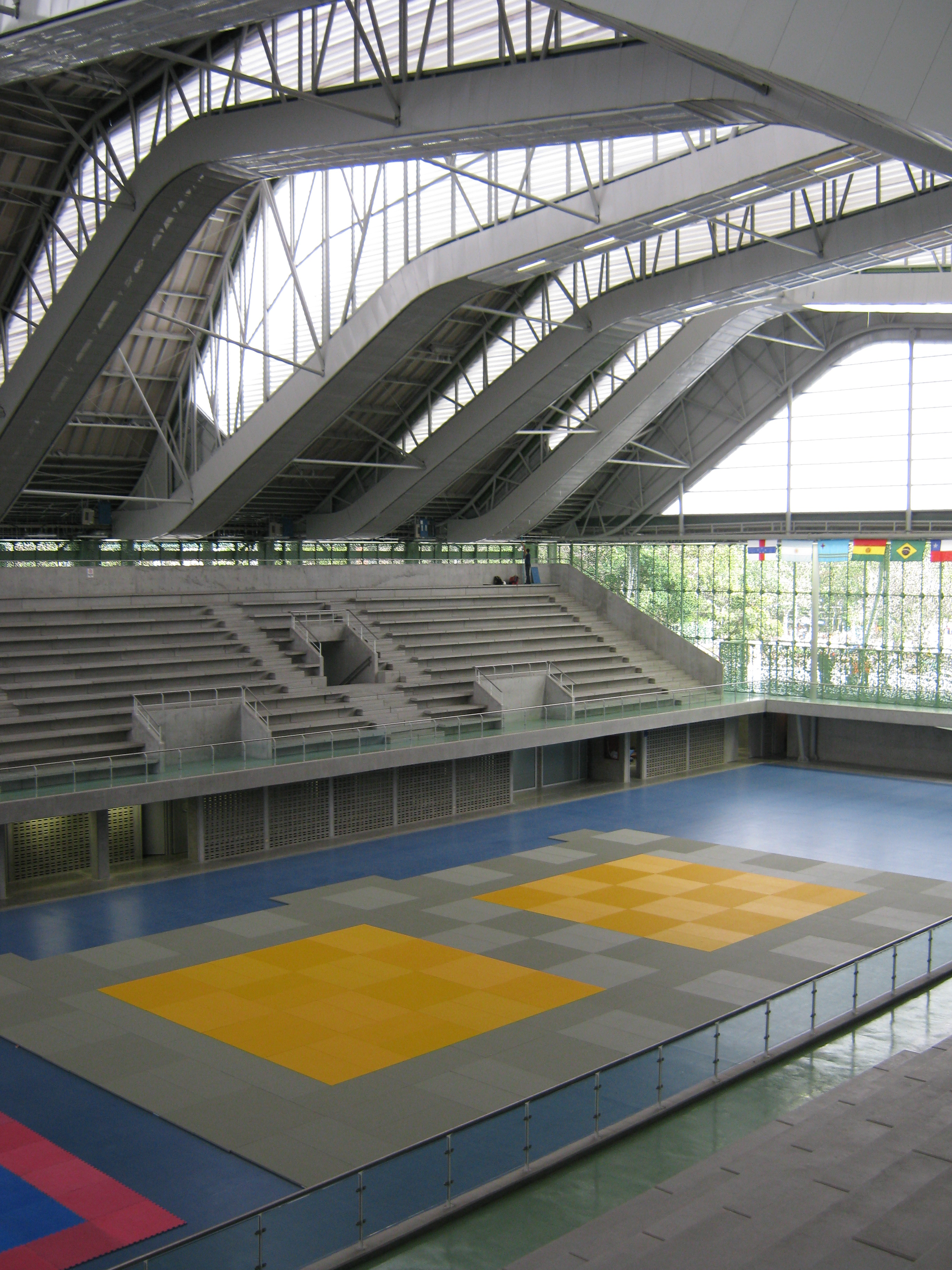
Interior view of the Guillermo Gaviria Correa Coliseum

The sports complex was completed in 18 months for the 2010 South American Games. In 2008, two years before the tournament, Medellín held an international design competition, in which was proposed the building of two new venues for gymnastics and martial arts for the Atanasio Girardot Sports Complex, and the renovation of the Iván de Beodut Coliseum, in which are held basketball, volleyball and handball events. The winning design featured a semi-open construction that interconnected the four sports arenas.

== Design ==
The coliseums are arranged along a north–south axis. The walls of the coliseums are perforated, allowing a natural breeze to pass through the arenas and saving money on air conditioning. The largest coliseum has a capacity of 9,000.

In 2012, the design was one of two structures in Colombia honored by the 8th Ibero-American Architecture and Urban Design Biennial, an initiative that honors the best architectural projects in Spain, Portugal, and Latin America.

== Iván de Beodut Coliseum ==
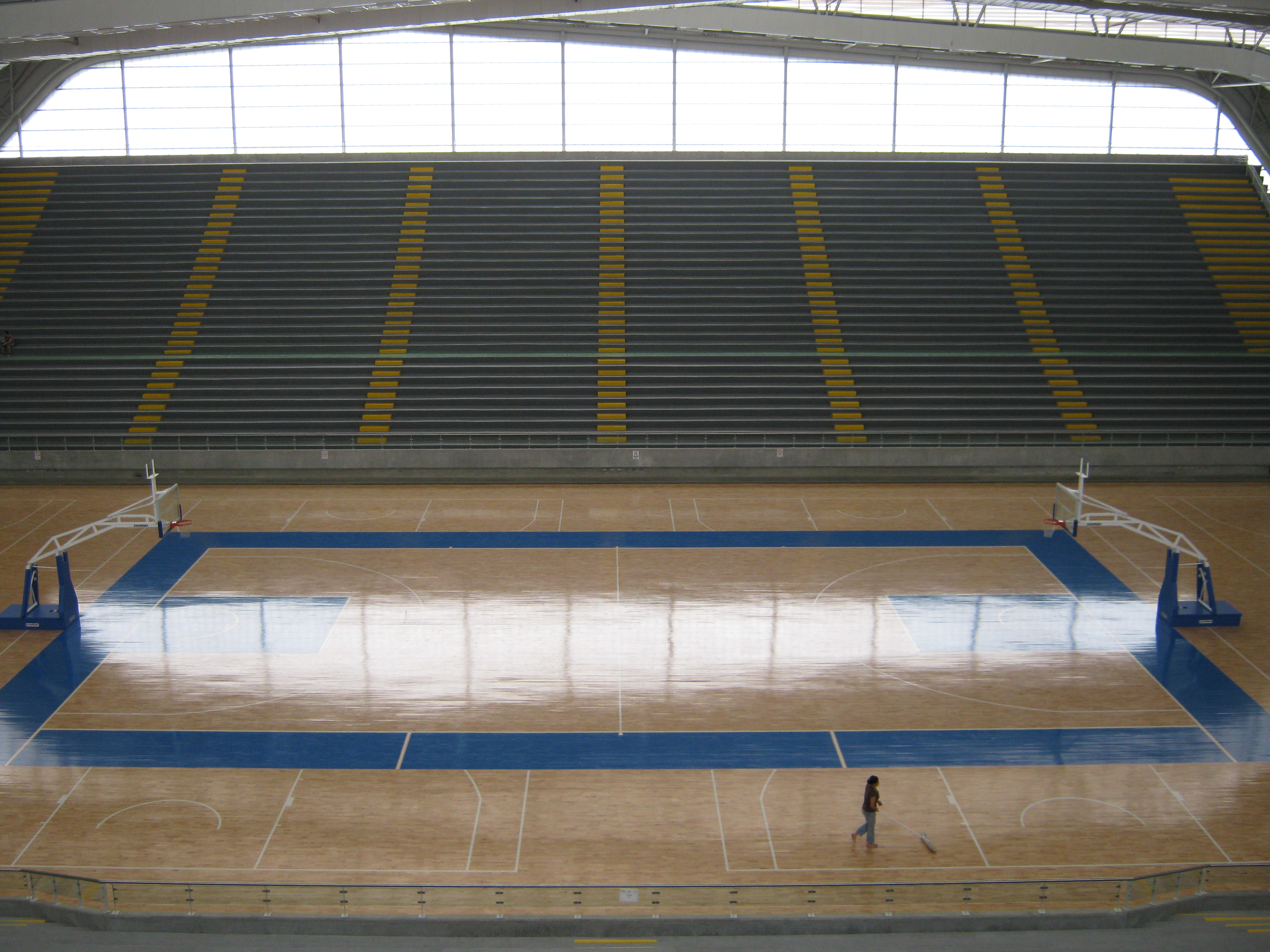
Coliseo Iván de Bedout

Iván de Beodut Coliseum, (Coliseo Cubierto Iván de Bedout in Spanish), also known as Coliseo Cubierto Mayor, is an indoor sporting arena built in 1955 and included in the Medellín Sports Coliseum since 2009. The capacity of the arena is for 6,000 people and is primarily used for basketball. The arena hosted the basketball competitions for the 2010 South American Games. The coliseum is one of the three venues chosen for the 2016 FIFA Futsal World Cup.

== See also ==
- Atanasio Girardot Sports Complex
