= Atanasio Girardot Sports Complex =

Sports venue in Medellín, Colombia

Coordinates: 6°15′24.48″N 75°35′24.62″W

- Unidad Deportiva Atanasio Girardot
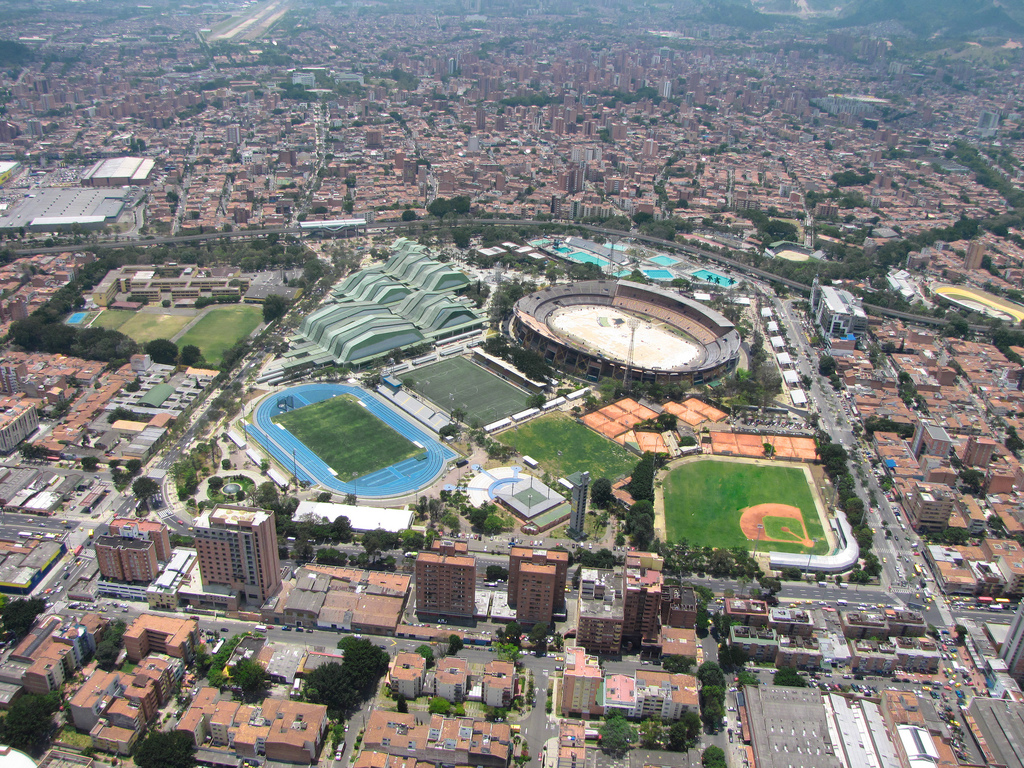
- Interactive map of Atanasio Girardot Sports Complex
- Location: Medellín, Colombia
- Operator: INDER Medellin

Construction
- Opened: 19 March 1953
- Renovated: 2010–2011

Tenants
- Atlético Nacional (1953–present); Independiente Medellín (1953–present)

Atanasio Girardot Sports Complex (officially Unidad Deportiva Atanasio Girardot) is a sports complex located in Medellín, Colombia. The complex includes Estadio Atanasio Girardot, Medellín Sports Coliseum, Luis Alberto Villegas Stadium, and Alfonso Galvis Duque Stadium.

== Atanasio Girardot Stadium ==
Estadio Atanasio Girardot (Atanasio Girardot Stadium), commonly referred to as El Atanasio, is currently used mostly for football matches by two teams, Atlético Nacional and Independiente Medellín, two of the most successful and popular football clubs from Colombia. Its current capacity is 44,826 which ranks as the third largest in the country behind Estadio Deportivo Cali and Estadio Metropolitano Roberto Meléndez. The stadium was named after Atanasio Girardot, a Colombian revolutionary leader who fought alongside Simón Bolívar.

== Medellín Sports Coliseum ==
Medellin Sports Coliseum is a complex of five sports arenas: the Guillermo Gaviria Correa Coliseum for Martial Arts, the Jorge Valderrama Coliseum for Handball, the Jorge Hugo Giraldo Coliseum for Gymnastics, the Iván de Beodut Coliseum for Basketball, and the Yesid Santos Coliseum for Volleyball. The five gymnasiums were designed by Giancarlo Mazzanti and Plan B Architects. Three coliseums were renovated and two new coliseums were constructed in 18 months and with CO$50 million in preparation for the 2010 South American Games. The coliseum was built with wavy, sloped green roofs, and has an area of 493,000 square feet.

== Transport ==
The complex has its own station on line B of the Medellín Metro, which is named Estadio.
