= 1982 FIBA World Championship =

1982 edition of the FIBA World Championship

FIBA Campeonato Mundial de Baloncesto de 1982

Tournament details
- Host country: Colombia
- Dates: 15–28 August
- Officially opened by: Belisario Betancur
- Teams: 13 (from 5 confederations)
- Venue(s): 5 (in 5 host cities)

Final positions
- Champions: Soviet Union (3rd title)
- Runners-up: United States
- Third place: Yugoslavia
- Fourth place: Spain

Tournament statistics
- Games played: 50
- MVP: (United States) Doc Rivers
- Top scorer: (Panama) Rolando Frazer (24.4 points per game)

The 1982 FIBA World Championship was the 9th FIBA World Championship, the international basketball world championship for men's national teams. The tournament was hosted by Colombia from 15 to 28 August 1982.

== Qualification ==
Defending World Champions
Host country, advances outright to the semifinal round

Americas (6)	Europe (4)	FIBA Asia (1)	Africa (1)	Oceania (1)
United States	Yugoslavia	China	Ivory Coast	Australia
Panama	Soviet Union			
Colombia	Spain			
Uruguay	Czechoslovakia			
Canada				
Brazil				

== Venues ==
Group A	Group B	Group C	Classification round	Final round
Bogotá	Medellín	Bucaramanga	Cúcuta	Cali
Coliseo Cubierto El Campín	Coliseo Iván de Bedout	Coliseo Vicente Díaz Romero	Coliseo Toto Hernández	Coliseo El Pueblo
Capacity: 14,000	Capacity: 10,000	Capacity: 5,000	Capacity: 6,000	Capacity: 18,000

== Competing nations ==
Group A	Group B	Group C
China; Panama; Spain; United States	Australia; Brazil; Ivory Coast; Soviet Union	Canada; Czechoslovakia; Uruguay; Yugoslavia
Colombia – advanced automatically to the semifinal round as host

== Preliminary round ==
=== Group A ===
Pos	Team	Pld	W	L	PF	PA	PD	Pts	Qualification
1	Spain	3	3	0	305	262	+43	6	Semifinal round
2	United States	3	2	1	295	261	+34	5	Semifinal round
3	Panama	3	1	2	285	280	+5	4	Classification round
4	China	3	0	3	243	325	−82	3	Classification round

Source: FIBA archive
Rules for classification: 1) points; 2) head-to-head points; 3) head-to-head goal average; 4) head-to-head number of points scored.

15 August

Spain	88–85	Panama
Scoring by half: 47-40, 41-45

Coliseo Cubierto El Campín, Bogotá

15 August

United States	96–73	China
Scoring by half: 47-44, 49-29

Coliseo Cubierto El Campín, Bogotá

16 August

United States	100–79	Panama
Scoring by half: 46-45, 54-34

Coliseo Cubierto El Campín, Bogotá

16 August

China	78–108	Spain
Scoring by half: 29-64, 49-44

Coliseo Cubierto El Campín, Bogotá

17 August

Panama	121–92	China
Scoring by half: 73-54, 48-38

Coliseo Cubierto El Campín, Bogotá

17 August

United States	99–109	Spain
Scoring by half: 49-50, 50-59

Coliseo Cubierto El Campín, Bogotá

=== Group B ===
Pos	Team	Pld	W	L	PF	PA	PD	Pts	Qualification
1	Soviet Union	3	3	0	336	241	+95	6	Semifinal round
2	Australia	3	2	1	224	240	−16	5	Semifinal round
3	Brazil	3	1	2	267	253	+14	4	Classification round
4	Ivory Coast	3	0	3	218	311	−93	3	Classification round

Source: FIBA archive
Rules for classification: 1) points; 2) head-to-head points; 3) head-to-head goal average; 4) head-to-head number of points scored.

15 August

Soviet Union	129–80	Ivory Coast
Scoring by half: 75-39, 54-41

Coliseo Ivan de Bedout, Medellín

15 August

Brazil	73–75 (OT)	Australia
Scoring by half: 28-30, 39-37 Overtime: 6-8

Coliseo Ivan de Bedout, Medellín

16 August

Soviet Union	108–69	Australia
Scoring by half: 53-30, 55-39

Coliseo Ivan de Bedout, Medellín

16 August

Ivory Coast	79–102	Brazil
Scoring by half: 31-60, 48-42

Coliseo Ivan de Bedout, Medellín

17 August

Australia	80–59	Ivory Coast
Scoring by half: 34-25, 46-34

Coliseo Ivan de Bedout, Medellín

17 August

Soviet Union	99–92	Brazil
Scoring by half: 51-53, 48-39

Coliseo Ivan de Bedout, Medellín

=== Group C ===
Pos	Team	Pld	W	L	PF	PA	PD	Pts	Qualification
1	Yugoslavia	3	3	0	290	235	+55	6	Semifinal round
2	Canada	3	2	1	269	265	+4	5	Semifinal round
3	Czechoslovakia	3	1	2	290	289	+1	4	Classification round
4	Uruguay	3	0	3	239	299	−60	3	Classification round

Source: FIBA archive
Rules for classification: 1) points; 2) head-to-head points; 3) head-to-head goal average; 4) head-to-head number of points scored.

15 August

Canada	87–78	Uruguay
Scoring by half: 49-40, 38-38

Coliseo Vicente Díaz Romero, Bucaramanga

15 August

Yugoslavia	101–80	Czechoslovakia
Scoring by half: 46-40, 55-40

Coliseo Vicente Díaz Romero, Bucaramanga

16 August

Yugoslavia	101–77	Uruguay
Scoring by half: 54-34, 47-43

Coliseo Vicente Díaz Romero, Bucaramanga

16 August

Canada	104–99	Czechoslovakia
Scoring by half: 46-52, 58-47

Coliseo Vicente Díaz Romero, Bucaramanga

17 August

Uruguay	84–111	Czechoslovakia
Scoring by half: 42-50, 42-61

Coliseo Vicente Díaz Romero, Bucaramanga

17 August

Yugoslavia	88–78	Canada
Scoring by half: 50-39, 38-39

Coliseo Vicente Díaz Romero, Bucaramanga

== Classification round ==
Pos	Team	Pld	W	L	PF	PA	PD	Pts
8	Brazil	5	4	1	474	415	+59	9 (Note: Head-to-head record: Brazil 1–1 (1.017 GAvg), Panama 1–1 (0.994 GAvg), Czechoslovakia 1–1 (0.989 GAvg))
9	Panama	5	4	1	503	424	+79	9
10	Czechoslovakia	5	4	1	499	449	+50	9
11	Uruguay	5	2	3	404	440	−36	7
12	China	5	1	4	406	474	−68	6
13	Ivory Coast	5	0	5	416	500	−84	5

Source: FIBA archive
Rules for classification: 1) points; 2) head-to-head points; 3) head-to-head goal average; 4) head-to-head number of points scored.
Notes:

19 August

Panama	117–83	Ivory Coast
Scoring by half: 53-33, 64-50

Coliseo Toto Hernández, Cúcuta

19 August

Brazil	93–79	China
Scoring by half: 57-32, 36-47

Coliseo Toto Hernández, Cúcuta

20 August

Czechoslovakia	111–88	China
Scoring by half: 54-40, 57-48

Coliseo Toto Hernández, Cúcuta

20 August

Uruguay	75–92	Panama
Scoring by half: 32-47, 43-45

Coliseo Toto Hernández, Cúcuta

21 August

Czechoslovakia	94–92	Ivory Coast
Scoring by half: 46-40, 48-52

Coliseo Toto Hernández, Cúcuta

21 August

Uruguay	77–96	Brazil
Scoring by half: 43-52, 34-44

Coliseo Toto Hernández, Cúcuta

22 August

China	91–77	Ivory Coast
Scoring by half: 39-39, 52-38

Coliseo Toto Hernández, Cúcuta

22 August

Panama	86–85	Brazil
Scoring by half: 51-50, 35-35

Coliseo Toto Hernández, Cúcuta

23 August

Uruguay	72–56	China
Scoring by half: 35-30, 37-26

Coliseo Toto Hernández, Cúcuta

23 August

Czechoslovakia	89–87	Panama
Scoring by half: 45-42, 44-45

Coliseo Toto Hernández, Cúcuta

24 August

Uruguay	96–85	Ivory Coast
Scoring by half: 51-45, 45-40

Coliseo Toto Hernández, Cúcuta

24 August

Czechoslovakia	94–98	Brazil
Scoring by half: 47-42, 47-56

Coliseo Toto Hernández, Cúcuta

== Semifinal round ==
Pos	Team	Pld	W	L	PF	PA	PD	Pts	Qualification
1	United States	6	5	1	567	521	+46	11 (Note: Head-to-head record: United States 1–0 Soviet Union)	Final
2	Soviet Union	6	5	1	663	514	+149	11	Final
3	Yugoslavia	6	4	2	573	535	+38	10 (Note: Head-to-head record: Yugoslavia 1–0 Spain)	Third place playoff
4	Spain	6	4	2	612	564	+48	10	Third place playoff
5	Australia	6	2	4	489	563	−74	8	
6	Canada	6	1	5	495	519	−24	7	
7	Colombia (H)	6	0	6	473	656	−183	6	

Source: FIBA archive
Rules for classification: 1) points; 2) head-to-head points; 3) head-to-head goal average; 4) head-to-head number of points scored.
(H) Hosts
Notes:

19 August

Colombia	84–137	Spain
Scoring by half: 34-75, 50-62

Coliseo El Pueblo, Cali

19 August

Canada	83–114	Soviet Union
Scoring by half: 33-45, 50-69

Coliseo El Pueblo, Cali

20 August

Yugoslavia	81–88	United States
Scoring by half: 46-55, 35-33

Coliseo El Pueblo, Cali

20 August

Canada	78–84	Australia
Scoring by half: 30-44, 48-40

Coliseo El Pueblo, Cali

21 August

Yugoslavia	108–91	Spain
Scoring by half: 54-49, 54-42

Coliseo El Pueblo, Cali

21 August

Colombia	76–143	Soviet Union
Scoring by half: 36-56, 40-87

Coliseo El Pueblo, Cali

22 August

Spain	99–87	Australia
Scoring by half: 53-50, 46-37

Coliseo El Pueblo, Cali

22 August

Colombia	83–100	United States
Scoring by half: 40-44, 43-56

Coliseo El Pueblo, Cali

23 August

Soviet Union	99–94	Yugoslavia
Scoring by half: 46-52, 53-42

Coliseo El Pueblo, Cali

23 August

United States	71–69	Canada
Scoring by half: 42-34, 29-35

Coliseo El Pueblo, Cali

24 August

Colombia	63–72	Australia
Scoring by half: 27-40, 36-32

Coliseo El Pueblo, Cali

24 August

Spain	83–80	Canada
Scoring by half: 42-46, 41-34

Coliseo El Pueblo, Cali

25 August

Colombia	88–97	Yugoslavia
Scoring by half: 45-50, 43-47

Coliseo El Pueblo, Cali

25 August

Spain	93–106	Soviet Union
Scoring by half: 44-58, 49-48

Coliseo El Pueblo, Cali

26 August

Australia	91–105	Yugoslavia
Scoring by half: 37-61, 54-44

Coliseo El Pueblo, Cali

26 August

United States	99–93	Soviet Union
Scoring by half: 48-51, 51-42

Coliseo El Pueblo, Cali

27 August

Colombia	79–107	Canada
Scoring by half: 38-53, 41-54

Coliseo El Pueblo, Cali

27 August

Australia	86–110	United States
Scoring by half: 37-49, 49-61

Coliseo El Pueblo, Cali

== Final round ==
=== Third place playoff ===
28 August

Yugoslavia	119–117	Spain
Scoring by half: 60-47, 59-70

Coliseo El Pueblo, Cali

=== Final ===
28 August

Soviet Union	95–94	United States
Scoring by half: 47–49, 48–45
Pts: Myshkin 29		Pts: Rivers 24

Coliseo El Pueblo, Cali

== Final standings ==
Rank	Team	Record
1	Soviet Union	8–1
2	United States	7–2
3	Yugoslavia	7–2
4	Spain	6–3
5	Australia	4–4
6	Canada	3–5
7	Colombia	0–6
8	Brazil	4–3
9	Panama	4–3
10	Czechoslovakia	4–3
11	Uruguay	2–5
12	China	1–6
13	Ivory Coast	0–7

== Awards ==
1982 FIBA World champions

Soviet Union
3rd title

Most Valuable Player
(United States) Doc Rivers

=== All-Tournament Team ===
- Doc Rivers (USA)
- Dragan Kićanović (Yugoslavia)
- Juan Antonio San Epifanio (Spain)
- Vladimir Tkachenko (USSR)
- Anatoli Myshkin (USSR)

== Top 10 scorers (points per game) ==
1. Rolando Frazer (Panama) 24.4
2. Ian Davies (Australia) 23.4
3. Wilfredo Ruiz (Uruguay) 23.4
4. Dié Drisa (Côte d'Ivoire) 21.6
5. Dragan Kićanović (Yugoslavia) 21.1
6. Oscar Schmidt (Brazil) 21.0
7. Stanislav Kropilak (Czechoslovakia) 19.3
8. Juan Antonio San Epifanio (Spain) 18.1
9. Gustav Hraska (Czechoslovakia) 18.0
10. Jay Triano (Canada) 17.9
