= Unicentro Medellín =

Unicentro Medellín Mall
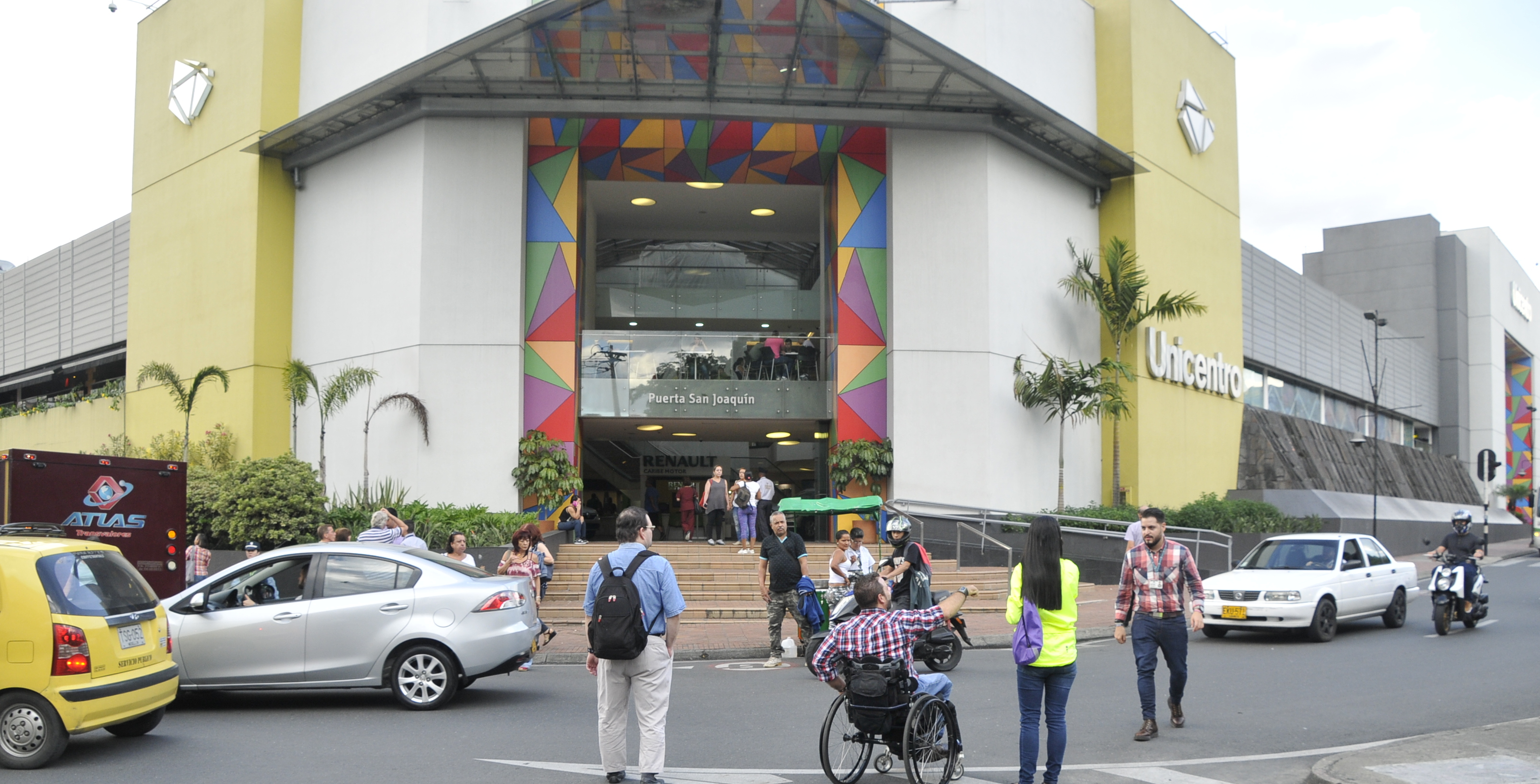
- Location: Medellín, Colombia
- Coordinates: 6.2408°N 75.5871°W
- Address: Carrera 66B # 34A-76, Conquistadores, Laureles - Estadio
- Opened: 6 November 1991
- Num. of stores: 271
- Num. of anchor tenants: 1
- Floor area: 90.000 m²
- Floors: 3
- Parking: 1504
- Website: www.unicentromedellin.com.co

The Unicentro Medellín Mall (Spanish: Centro Comercial Unicentro Medellín) is a mall located in the western part of the city of Medellín, in front of the campus of the Universidad Pontificia Bolivariana.

It has 91,000 square metres of built area, 271 commercial premises, 16 offices, 1,000 parking spaces for cars and 400 spaces for motorcycles, as well as a bicycle parking lot with approximately 104 spaces. Additionally, it has a charging station for cars, motorcycles and electric bicycles.

It has a monthly traffic of one million people.

== History ==
Opened on November 6, 1991, Unicentro was the first mall in the western sector of Medellín. It has always been a centre of development for the neighbourhoods of Laureles, San Joaquín, Conquistadores, Belén Fátima and neighbourhoods surrounding Carrera 70 with its tourist corridor. It is also known for its proximity to the Universidad Pontificia Bolivariana.

The construction and inauguration of the commercial citadel was carried out with 18 billion pesos. The opening ceremony was attended by influential personalities such as: the governor of Antioquia, Gilberto Echeverri Mejía, the mayor of Medellín, Omar Flórez Vélez and the president of Colombia, César Gaviria Trujillo.

The Mayor's Office of Medellín awarded the city the "Gonzalo Mejía" Medal of Civic Merit, recognizing the trust that investors placed in Antioquia for the construction of a large project.

== Architecture ==
90,000 square metres were built, with 5,000 tons of cement, 6,000 tons of steel, two million bricks, 270 commercial premises and two movie theaters, as well as 16 offices. Materials such as brick, granite, wood and marble were used for the architectural structure of the mall.

The work "Entre Aguas" by the master Hugo Zapata, located on the main façade of the mall, was a mix of urban structure, architecture and sculpture. It was inspired by the ceremonial fountain "El Lavapatas" in San Agustín, a reference to the cultural wealth of the pre-Columbian tribes.

=== Remodeling ===
In 2013, with an investment of 22 billion pesos, Unicentro Medellín underwent a remodeling process that rejuvenated, expanded and illuminated the spaces of the mall.
