= Botanical Garden of Medellín =

Botanical garden in Colombia

- Joaquin Antonio Uribe Botanical Garden of Medellín
- Jardín Botánico de Medellín Joaquín Antonio Uribe
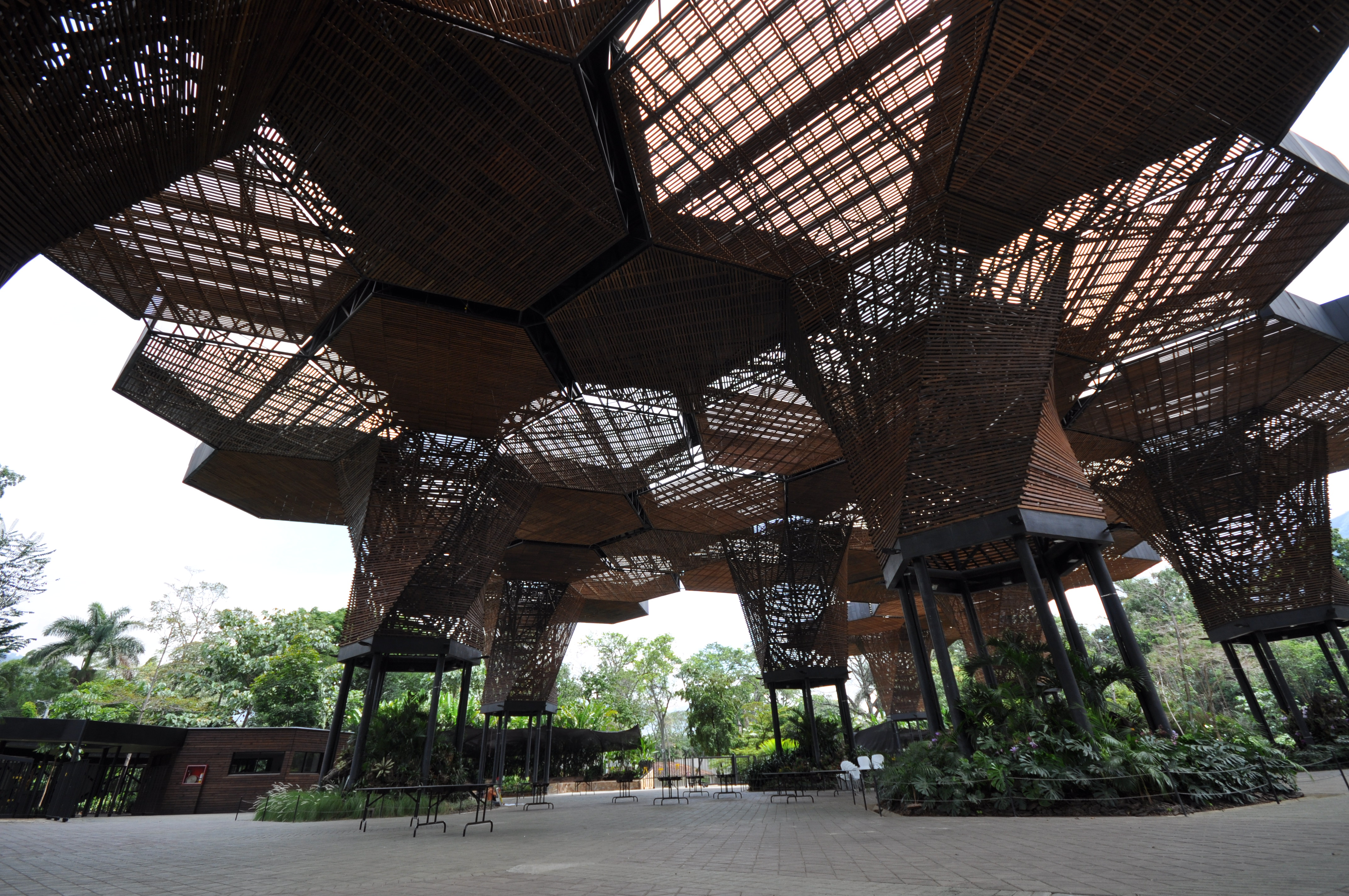
- The Orchideorama at the Botanical Gardens of Medellín.
- Interactive map of Botanical Garden of Medellín
- Type: Private
- Location: Medellín, Colombia
- Coordinates: 6.270833°N 75.564167°W
- Area: 13.2 hectares (33 acres)
- Opened: April 19, 1972; 54 years ago
- Operator: Botanical Garden Foundation of Medellín Joaquín Antonio Uribe
- Open: 9am to 5pm daily, including weekends and holidays

The Joaquin Antonio Uribe Botanical Garden of Medellín (Spanish: Joaquin Antonio Uribe Jardín Botánico de Medellín), more simply known as the Botanical Garden of Medellín, is a 14-hectare botanical garden in Medellín, Colombia. The botanical garden has 4,500 flowers and 139 recorded bird species. It has an important collection of orchids preserved in an architectural space called the "Orchideorama".

== Description ==
The entrance pavilion to the botanical garden was designed by Lorenzo Castro and Ana Elvira Vélez. The garden includes a butterfly house, cactus garden, exhibition spaces, library, and pond. A plan to create an additional pavilion was rejected and a competition for local architects was devised to come up with a new structure for the park.

The winners of the project designed the Orchideorama. This structure was jointly designed by Plan B Architects and JPRCR Architects. The structure is 65-feet high. It is a wood meshwork canopy with ten hexagonal flower-tree structures that collect rainwater and shelter an orchid collection and butterfly reserves.

== History ==
In the late nineteenth century, the land now occupied by the botanical garden began was a farm known as The Bathhouse of Eden (la Casa de Baños El Edén). The farm was originally owned by Mr. Victor Arango, and then his sisters and family listed on the deed.

The garden was temporarily closed due to high crime rates in the area. A plan was created to demolish the gardens but these were changed in favor of making renovations to the park.

It acquired the name "Joaquín Antonio Uribe Botanical Garden" in 1972 when the facilities were enlarged to add a much larger collection of plant species, an auditorium, library, museum, and spacious dining areas for visitors.

== Gallery ==
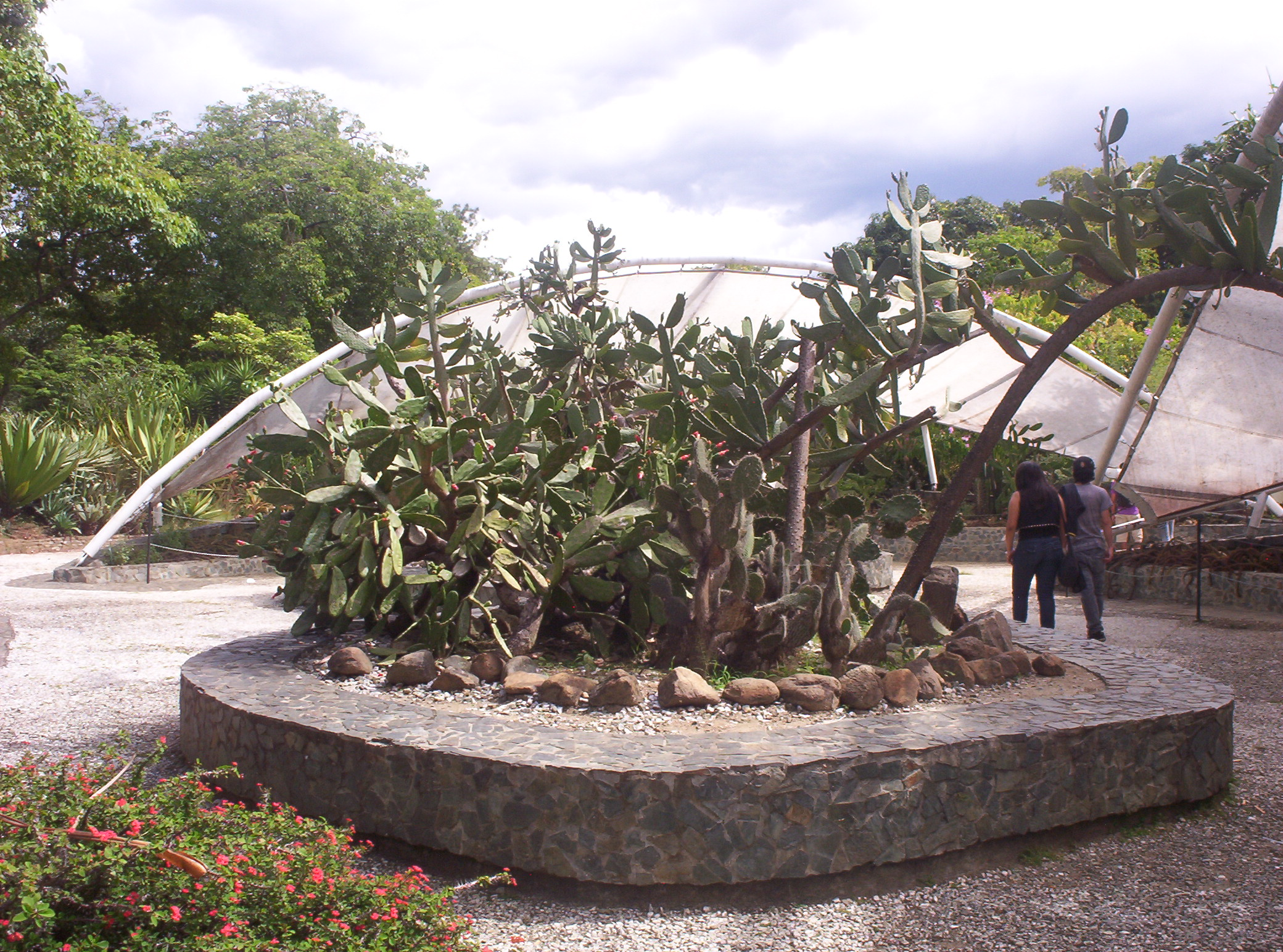
Cactus garden

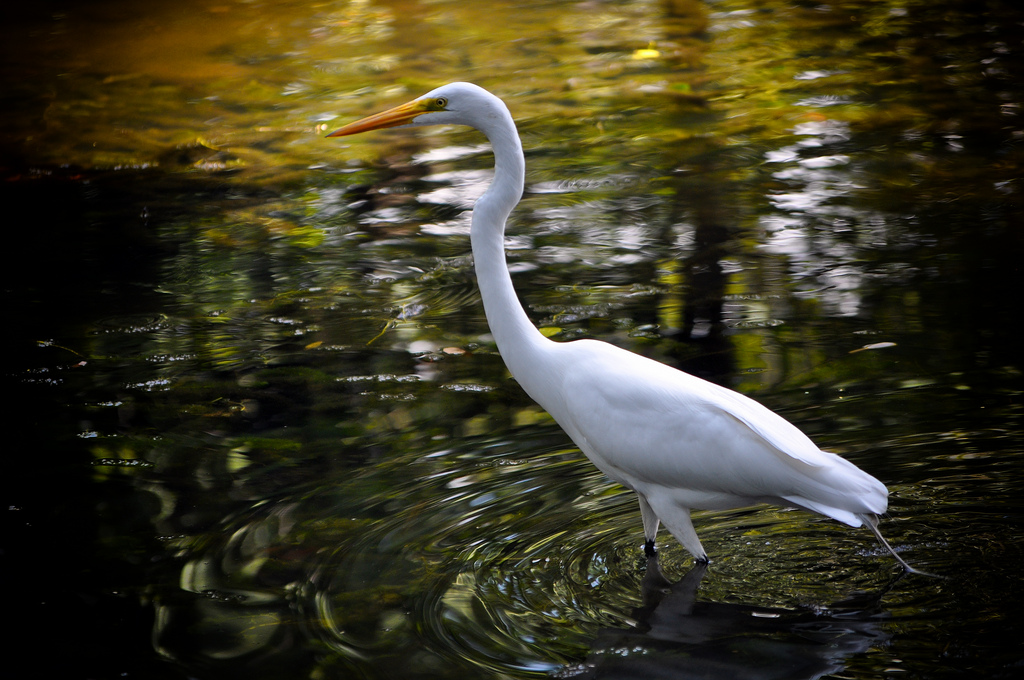
Great egret in water

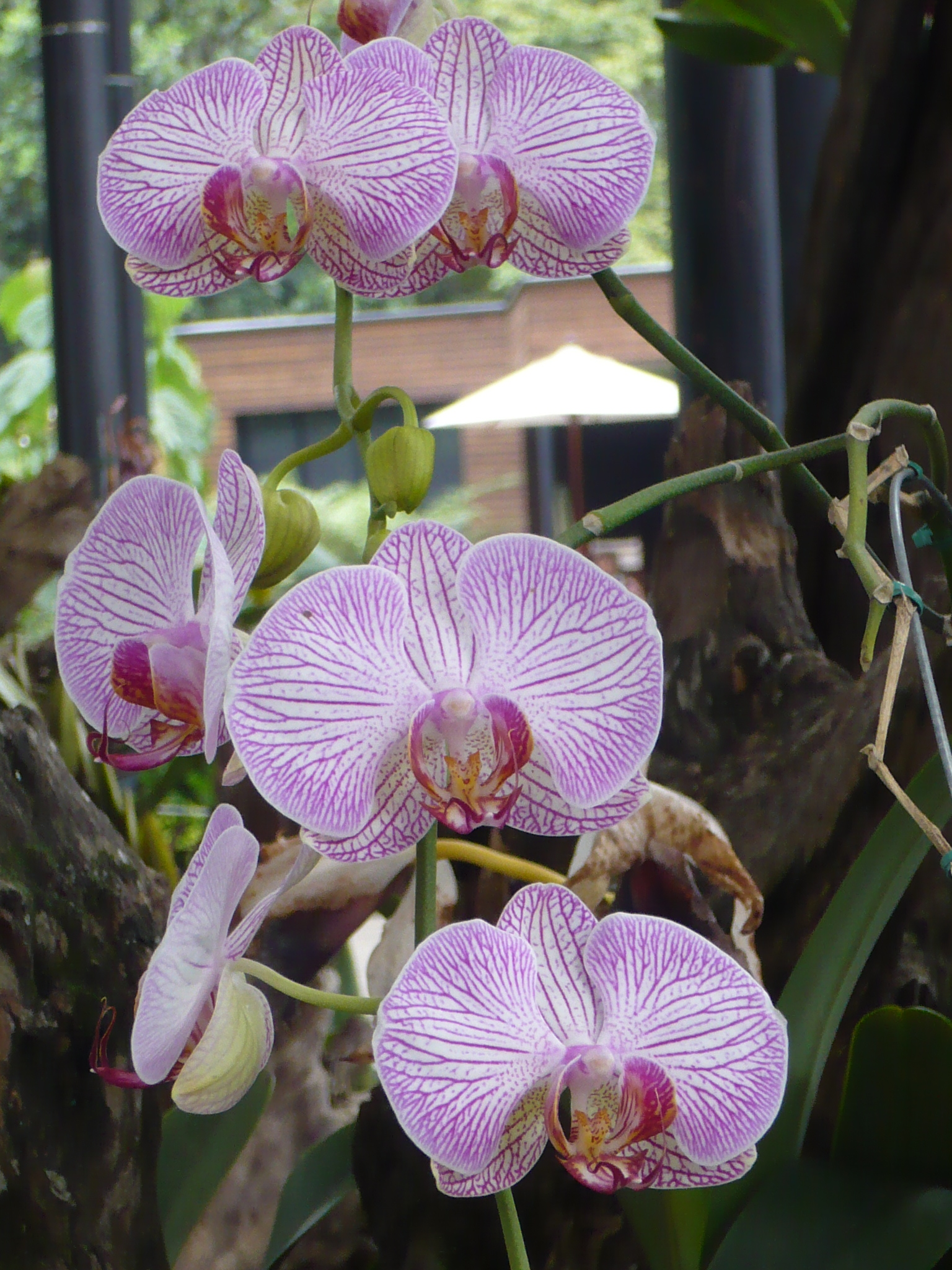
Orchids

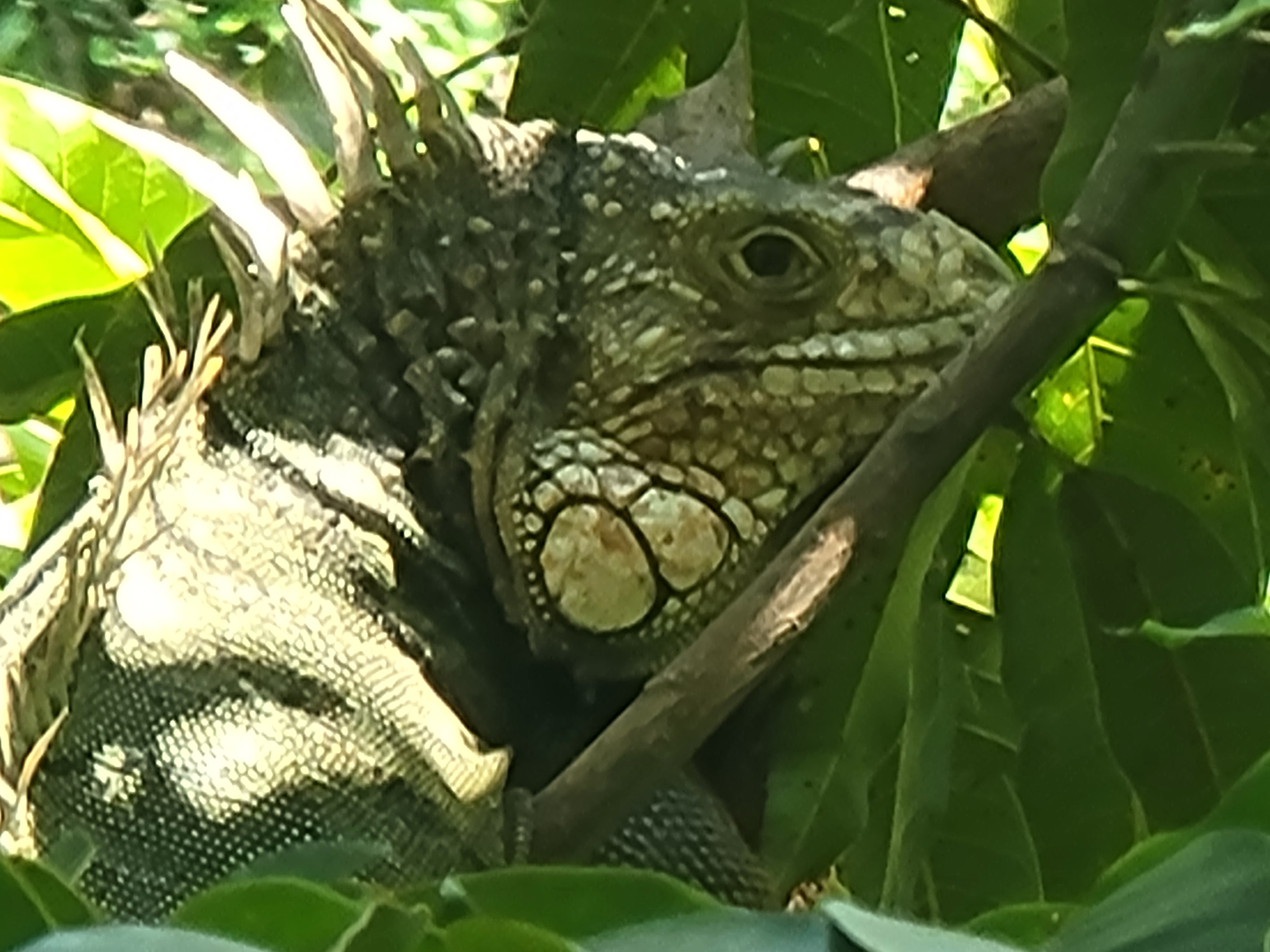
Adult green iguana in a tree above the lagoon

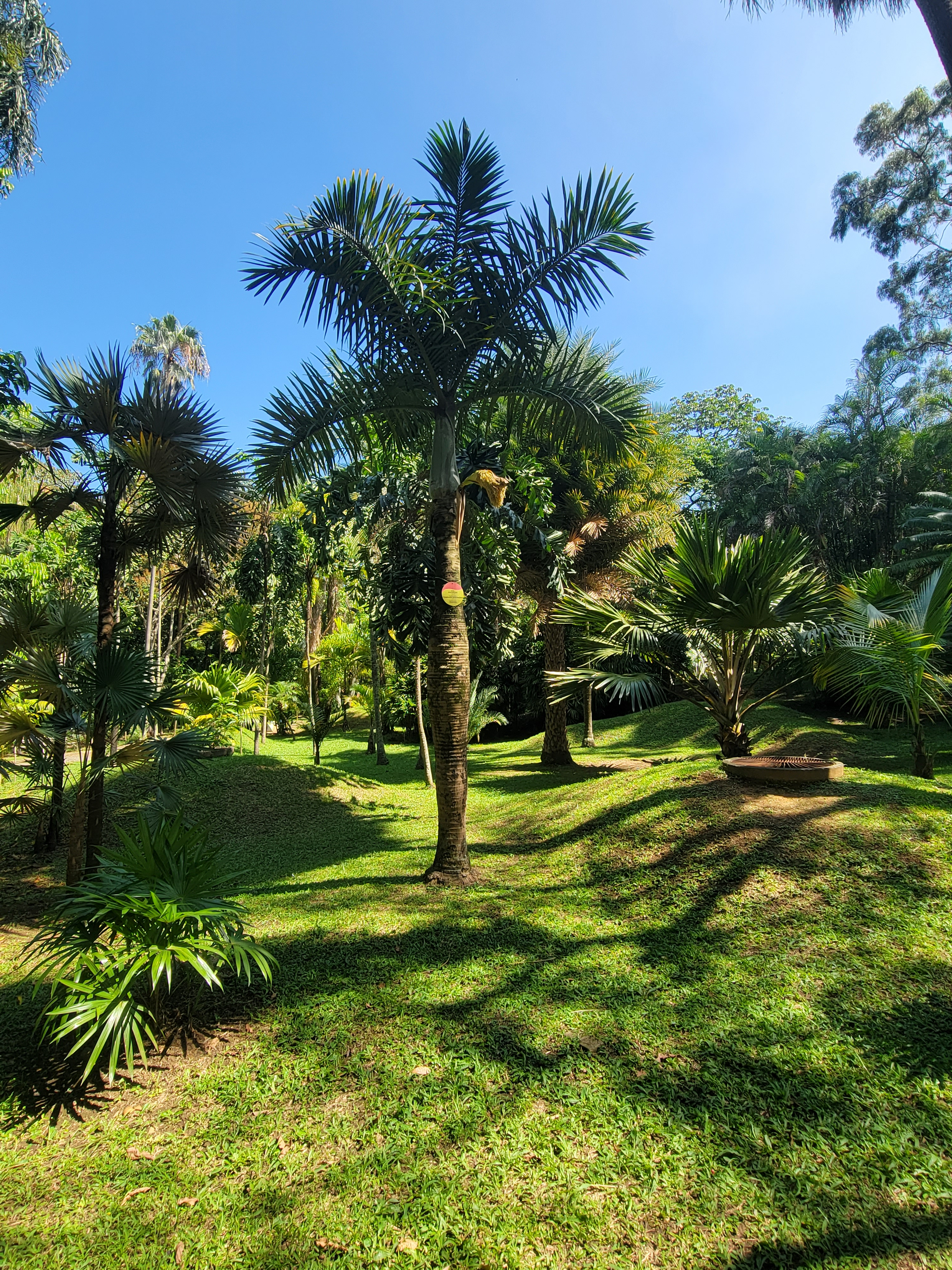
Palmiste Marron
