= Coliseo Bicentenario =

Indoor arena in Bucaramanga, Colombia

Coordinates: 7.1382°N 73.1163°W

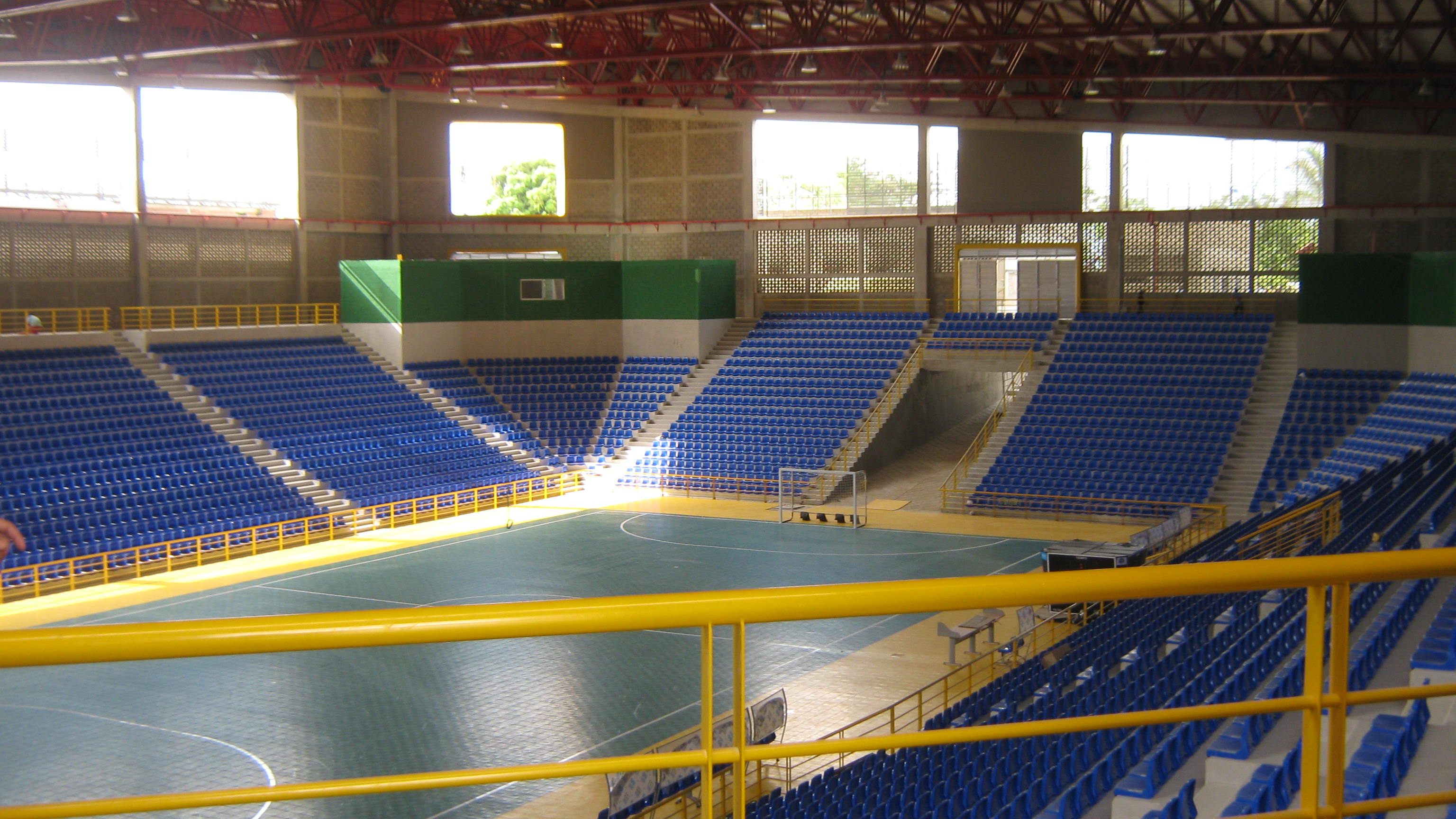
- Interactive map of Coliseo Bicentenario
- Location: Bucaramanga, Colombia
- Owner: INDERBU
- Capacity: 7,000

Construction
- Opened: 2011

Tenant
- Real Bucaramanga

Coliseo Bicentenario Alejandro Galvis Ramírez, mostly known as Coliseo Bicentenario, is an indoor sporting arena, located in Bucaramanga, Colombia. The stadium was built in 2011 for the AMF Futsal Men's World Cup and is part of the Villa Olímpica Alfonso López (Alfonso López Olympic Village), which is also composed by the Alfonso López stadium. The capacity of the stadium is for 7,000 spectators. Coliseo Bicentenario is currently used by futsal team Real Bucaramanga and was used previously by the now-defunct team Bucaramanga FSC. The stadium hosted the 2012 FIRS Senior Men's Inline Hockey World Championships. and was one of the three stadiums that hosted the 2016 FIFA Futsal World Cup.

== See also ==
- Estadio Américo Montanini
