= Coliseo El Pueblo =

Indoor sports venue in Cali, Colombia

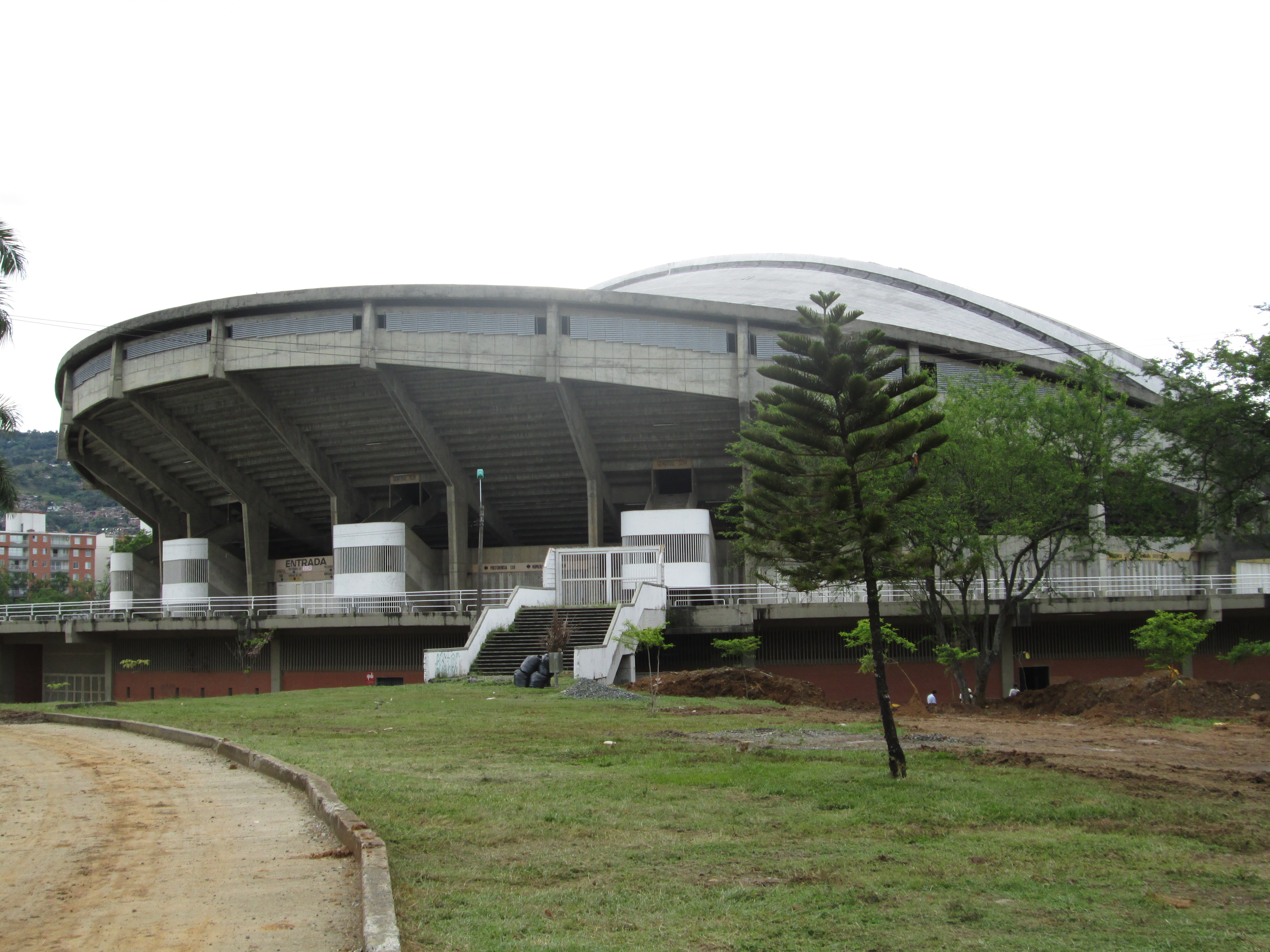
- Interactive map of Coliseo El Pueblo
- Location: Cali, Colombia
- Coordinates: 03°24′48.36″N 76°33′6.71″W
- Owner: Cali City Hall
- Operator: Secretary of Sports and Recreation of Cali
- Capacity: 12,000

Construction
- Opened: 30 July 1971
- Renovated: April 2016
- Architects: Libia Yusti; Pedro Enrique Richardson
- Project manager: Mayor of Santiago de Cali
- Structural engineer: Guillermo González Zuleta

Coliseo El Pueblo (English: Coliseum of the People) is an indoor sporting arena located in Cali, Colombia. Opened in 1971 for the 1971 Pan American Games, the capacity of the arena was, before it became a 12,000-capacity all-seater, 18,000.

It was designed by Colombian architect Pedro Enrique Richardson from the Richardson and Yusti studio (together with Libia Yusti). The calculation of structures was carried out by Harold Arzayuz.

== Events ==
On 2 September 1977, Colombian boxer José Cervantes (Kid Pambele's brother) out-pointed future world champion Jorge Luján of Panama in one of the few boxing matches held here.

The arena has hosted some world championships of indoor sports, most notably the 1982 FIBA World Championship and the 2016 FIFA Futsal World Cup.

It is also used for concerts, with the likes of Santana, Jowell & Randy, Ñejo & Dalmata, Yomo and Eloy, among others, having performed here.

== See also ==
- Velódromo Alcides Nieto Patiño

Events and tenants
Preceded by Ginásio do Ibirapuera (Brazil) São Paulo	FIBA Women's World Cup final venue 1975	Succeeded by Jangchung Arena (South Korea) Seoul
Preceded by Araneta Coliseum (Philippines) Quezon City	FIBA World Cup; Final Venue; 1982	Succeeded by Palacio de Deportes de la CAM (Spain) Madrid
Preceded by Indoor Stadium Huamark (Thailand) Bangkok	FIFA Futsal World Cup; Final Venue; 2016	Succeeded by Žalgiris Arena (Lithuania) Kaunas
