= Coliseo Iván de Bedout =

Sports arena in Medellín, Colombia

Iván de Beodut Coliseum
- Coliseo Iván de Bedout
- Coliseo Cubierto Mayor
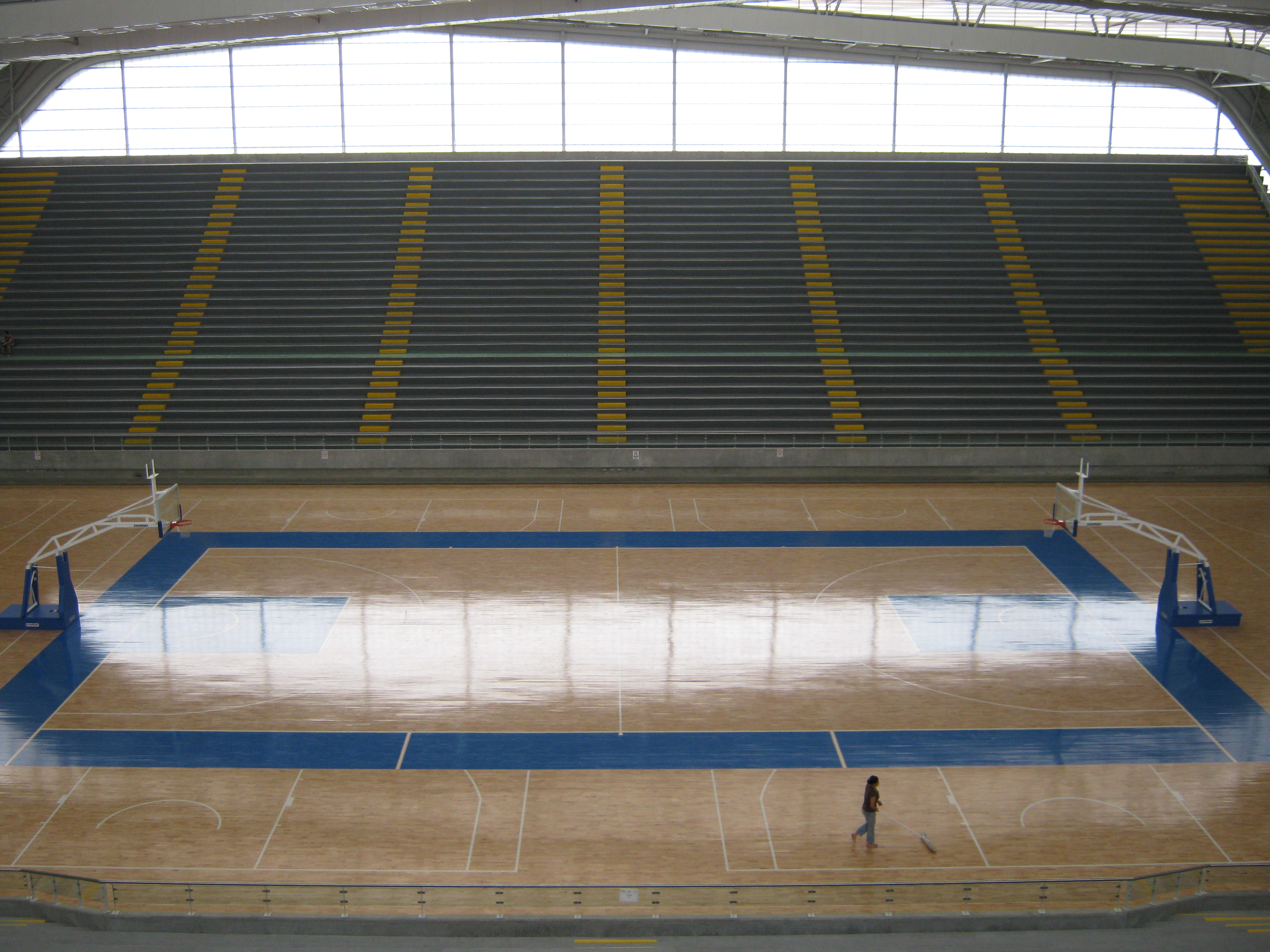
- Interactive map of Iván de Beodut Coliseum
- Full name: Coliseo Cubierto Iván de Bedout
- Location: Carrera 48 #70-10; Medellín, Antioquia, Colombia
- Coordinates: 6.2562°N 75.5879°W
- Capacity: Basketball: 6,000; Futsal: 6,000
- Surface: Parquet

Construction
- Opened: 1955
- Renovated: 2010, 2016

Tenant
- Arrieros de Antioquia

Coliseo Iván de Bedout is an indoor sporting arena that is located in Medellín, Colombia. The arena is mainly used to host basketball and futsal games. The arena's seating capacity for basketball and futsal games is 6,000. The arena has been a part of the Medellín Sports Coliseum since 2009.

== History ==
Coliseo Iván de Bedout was originally opened in 1955. It has been used as a host basketball arena of the 2010 South American Games, and the 2017 FIBA AmeriCup. It was also used as a host venue of the 2016 FIFA Futsal World Cup.

== See also ==
- Medellín Sports Coliseum
