= Basketball at the 2010 South American Games =

- Venue: Coliseo Iván de Bedout
- Dates: March 20–29

Basketball at the 2010 South American Games in Medellín was held from March 20 to March 29. All games were played at Coliseo Iván de Bedout.

== Medal summary ==
=== Medal table ===
Rank	Nation	Gold	Silver	Bronze	Total
1	Argentina (ARG)	1	1	0	2
2	Brazil (BRA)	1	0	0	1
3	Uruguay (URU)	0	1	0	1
4	Chile (CHI)	0	0	1	1
4	Colombia (COL)	0	0	1	1
Totals (5 entries)		2	2	2	6

== Men ==
=== First round ===
Team	W	L	Pts
Argentina	4	1	9
Uruguay	4	1	9
Chile	3	2	8
Brazil	2	3	7
Venezuela	2	3	7
Colombia	0	5	5

24-03-2010
Argentina	84 – 76	Venezuela
Uruguay	75 – 68	Brazil
Colombia	65 – 76	Chile
25-03-2010
Argentina	54 – 71	Uruguay
Chile	60 – 57	Brazil
Venezuela	59 – 49	Colombia
26-03-2010
Brazil	46 – 68	Argentina
Venezuela	65 – 72	Chile
Uruguay	73 – 42	Colombia
27-03-2010
Chile	74 – 76	Argentina
Venezuela	76 – 68	Uruguay
Colombia	51 – 69	Brazil
28-03-2010
Uruguay	52 – 42	Chile
Brazil	92 – 62	Venezuela
Colombia	56 – 71	Argentina

=== 5th/6th Placement ===
29-03-2010
Venezuela	74 – 61	Colombia

=== Bronze-medal match ===
29-03-2010
Chile	78 – 69	Brazil

=== Gold-medal match ===
29-03-2010
Uruguay	46 – 60	Argentina

== Women ==
=== Group stage ===
==== Group A ====
Team	W	L	Pts
Brazil	3	0	6
Colombia	2	1	5
Venezuela	1	2	4
Ecuador	0	3	3

20-03-2010
Brazil	93 – 48	Ecuador
Colombia	53 – 46	Venezuela

21-03-2010
Venezuela	57 – 86	Brazil
Colombia	63 – 58	Ecuador

22-03-2010
Ecuador	59 – 67	Venezuela
Colombia	42 – 60	Brazil

==== Group B ====
Team	W	L	Pts
Argentina	2	0	4
Chile	1	1	3
Paraguay	0	2	2

20-03-2010
Argentina	70 – 37	Paraguay

21-03-2010
Paraguay	73 – 78	Chile

21-03-2010
Chile	63 – 74	Argentina

=== Semifinals ===
20-03-2010
Brazil	65 – 48	Chile
Argentina	66 – 42	Colombia

=== Bronze-medal match ===
29-03-2010
Chile	39 – 44	Colombia

=== Gold-medal match ===
29-03-2010
Brazil	63 – 49	Argentina
