= Miguel Ângelo (futsal player) =

Portuguese futsal player

Personal information
- Full name: Miguel Ângelo Magno Castro
- Date of birth: 2 February 1994 (age 32)
- Place of birth: Aldoar, Portugal
- Height: 1.78 m (5 ft 10 in)
- Position: Winger

Team information
- Current team: Sporting CP
- Number: 20

Youth career
- 2002–2011: Boavista
- 2012–2013: Sporting CP

Senior career*
| Years | Team | Apps | (Gls) |
| 2009–2012 | Boavista | | |
| 2012–2016 | Sporting CP | 78 | (14) |
| 2016–2020 | Benfica | 78 | (27) |
| 2020–2021 | Braga/AAUM | 30 | (18) |
| 2021–2023 | Sporting CP | 42 | (10) |
| 2023– | Fortitudo Pomezia | | |

International career^{‡}
| | Portugal U21 | 11 | (3) |
| 2015– | Portugal | 25 | (3) |
- * Club domestic league appearances and goals as of 00:00, 11 November 2023 (UTC) ‡ National team caps and goals as of 30 July 2018

Miguel Ângelo Magno Castro (born 2 February 1994) is a Portuguese futsal player who plays as a winger for the Portugal national team and Fortitudo Pomezia in the Italian futsal Serie A.

== Honours ==
Benfica

- Campeonato Nacional: 2018–19
- Taça da Liga: 2019–20

=== International ===
Portugal

- FIFA Futsal World Cup: 2021
- UEFA Futsal Championship: 2022
