= Gilberto Echeverri Mejía =

Colombian politician (1936–2003)

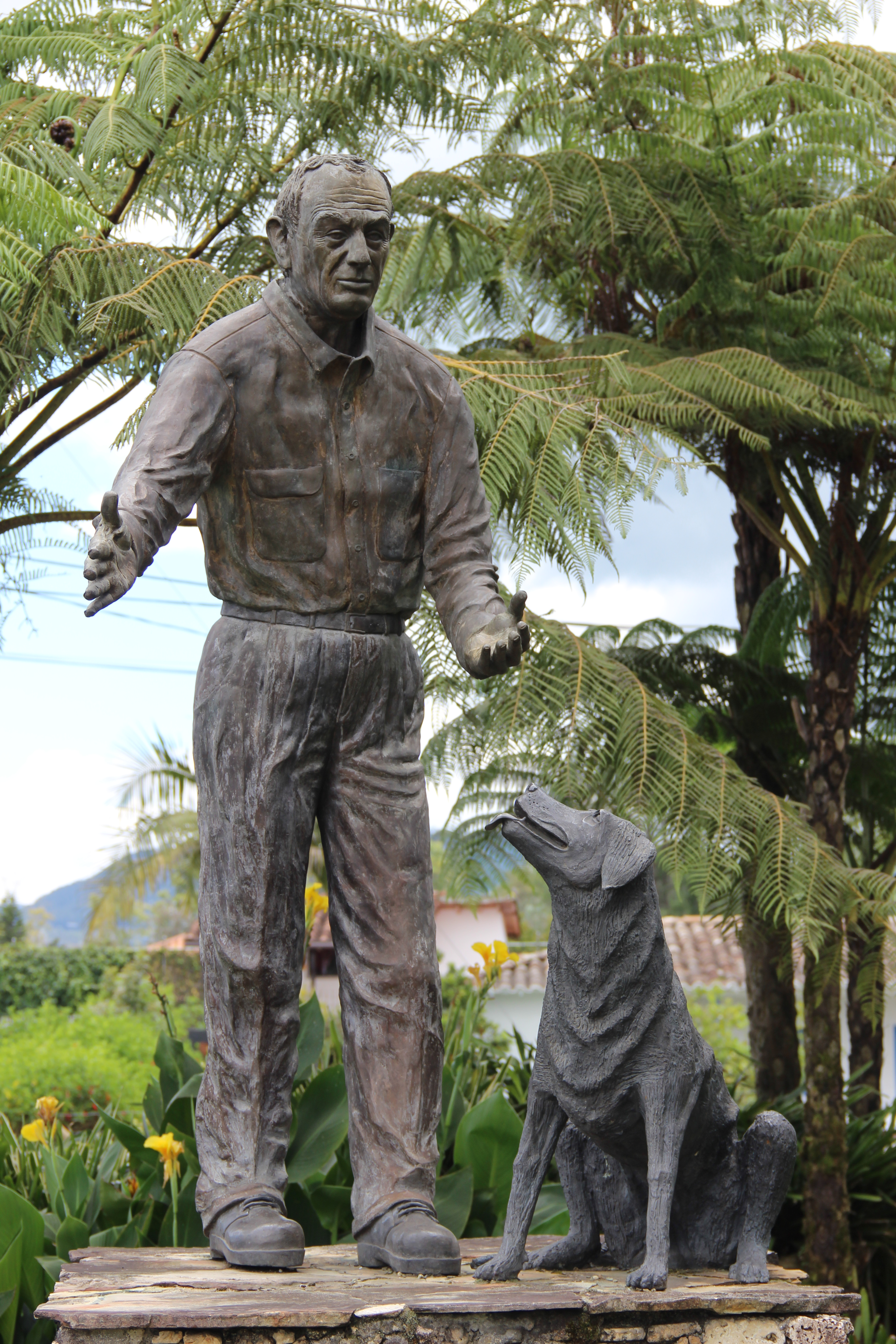

Minister of National Defence
- In office 10 April 1997 – 7 August 1998
- President: Ernesto Samper
- Preceded by: Guillermo González
- Succeeded by: Rodrigo Lloreda

Governor of Antioquia
- In office 28 August 1990 – 31 December 1991
- President: César Gaviria
- Preceded by: Helena Herrán González
- Succeeded by: Juan Pablo Gómez

Minister of Economic Development
- In office 7 August 1978 – 14 May 1980
- President: Julio César Turbay
- Preceded by: Diego Moreno Jaramillo
- Succeeded by: Andrés Restrepo Londoño

Colombia Ambassador to Ecuador
- In office 1975–1977
- President: Alfonso López Michelsen

Personal details
- Born: Gilberto Echeverri Mejía; 31 July 1936 Rionegro, Antioquia, Colombia
- Died: 5 May 2003 (aged 66) Urrao, Antioquia, Colombia
- Party: Liberal
- Spouse: Marta Inés Pérez Mejía (1962-2003)
- Children: Lina María Echeverri Pérez, Jorge Ignacio Echeverri Pérez, Carlos Arturo Echeverri Pérez
- Education: Pontifical Bolivarian University (BSEE, 1959)
- Profession: Electrical Engineer

Gilberto Echeverri Mejía (31 July 1936 – 5 May 2003) was a Colombian electrical engineer, businessman and politician who on 21 April 2002 was kidnapped by the Revolutionary Armed Forces of Colombia - FARC-EP along with the then-Governor of Antioquia Guillermo Gaviria Correa among others while participating in a peace walk and held hostage until 5 May 2003 when he was murdered by the guerrillas during a botched rescue operation by government forces deep in the Colombian northwestern jungle, bordering between Antioquia and Chocó. A Liberal party politician, he had previously served as Ambassador of Colombia to Ecuador from 1975 to 1977 in the Administration of President Alfonso López Michelsen, Minister of Economic Development from 1978 to 1980 in the Administration of President Julio César Turbay Ayala, Minister of National Defence from 1997 to 1998 in the Administration of President Ernesto Samper Pizano, and was working as peace advisor to Governor Gaviria before he was kidnapped.

== Personal life ==
Gilberto was born on 31 July 1936 in Rionegro, Antioquia and was the youngest of twelve children born to José María Echeverri and María Mejía. He finished his secondary education in 1954 at the Pontifical Bolivarian University where he also graduated in 1959 with a Bachelor of Electrical Engineering. In 1962 he married Marta Inés Pérez Mejía, with whom he had three children: Lina María, Jorge Ignacio, and Carlos Arturo.

== Works selected ==
- Echeverri Mejía, Gilberto (April 2006). Palacios Chamat, Mónica (ed.). Bítacora Desde El Cautiverio [Journal From Captivity] (in Spanish). Medellín: EAFIT University. ISBN 978-958-8173-85-6. LCCN 2006481628. OCLC 133467559.
  - Delfín Acevedo Restrepo (2006-06-05). "El libro de Gilberto Echeverri". El Mundo (Review) (in Spanish).

== See also ==
- Colombian conflict
- Consuelo Araújo
- List of kidnappings
