= Plan B Architects =

Colombian architecture firm

Plan B architects is a Colombian architecture firm. The firm designed the towering Orchidiarium at the Medellin Botanical Garden with JPRCR Architects. Plan B also designed the V House in Bogotá. The firm assisted Mazzanti in designing the Medellín Sports Coliseum.
