= Djô =

Portuguese futsal player

Personal information
- Full name: Jorge Augusto Fernandes
- Date of birth: 11 January 1986 (age 40)
- Place of birth: Praia, Cape Verde
- Height: 1.83 m (6 ft 0 in)
- Positions: Winger; defender

Team information
- Current team: Leões Porto Salvo
- Number: 7

Youth career
- 1997–1998: Metralhas da Damaia
- 1998–2001: FC Altinho
- 2001–2005: Sporting CP

Senior career*
Years	Team	Apps	(Gls)
2004–2018	Sporting CP	341	(57)
2005–2007	→ Sassoeiros (loan)		
2018–	Leões Porto Salvo	7	(0)

International career^{‡}
2009–2016	Portugal	64	(12)
- * Club domestic league appearances and goals as of 00:00, 7 August 2018 (UTC) ‡ National team caps and goals as of 00:00, 16 February 2021 (UTC)

Jorge Augusto Fernandes (born 11 January 1986), known as Djô, is a Portuguese futsal player who plays for Leões Porto Salvo and the Portugal national team.
