= Guillermo Gaviria Correa =

Colombian politician

- Born: November 27, 1962; Medellín, Colombia
- Died: May 5, 2003 (aged 40); Colombia
- Cause of death: Homicide
- Occupation: Governor of Antioquia
- Known for: Kidnapping and murder by FARC guerillas

Guillermo Gaviria Correa (November 27, 1962, Medellín – May 5, 2003) was the state governor of Antioquia, a province of over 6 million people in northwestern Colombia. Kidnapped by FARC guerrillas during a march against violence on April 21, 2002, he was held captive for over a year deep in the northwestern Colombian jungle, bordering between Antioquia and Chocó, until he was killed there by the FARC along with other nine fellow hostages, including the politician and former Minister of defense, Gilberto Echeverri Mejía, in response to an attempted military rescue on May 5, 2003. Gaviria Correa's letters survived his execution, and were published as Diary of a Kidnapped Colombian Governor. His gubernatorial agenda also survived, carried on by his younger brother Anibal. Gaviria Correa was nominated posthumously for the 2004 Nobel Peace Prize, but did not receive the prize that year.

== Education and career ==
Gaviria Correa was the eldest of eight children of a prominent family in Antioquia. Having completed his undergraduate studies in 1988 at the Colorado School of Mines in the U.S., he then began work at a Colombian ferronickel mine, Cerro Matoso S.A.

In 1994 Gaviria Correa accepted the invitation of Colombian President Ernesto Samper to lead the newly created Institute of National Roads. In this capacity, he oversaw the improvement and repair of Colombian roads and bridges until 1999.

In 2000 Gaviria Correa was elected Governor of Antioquia. His administration focused on improvement in six areas: housing, education, peace, reforestation, food security and nutrition, and administrative transparency. Gaviria Correa was also chosen by his fellow Governors to preside over the Colombian Federation of Governors.

== Nonviolence and sacrifice ==
As part of his "Congruent Peace Plan", Guillermo Gaviria Correa took inspiration from Martin Luther King Jr. and Mahatma Gandhi, and began deploying non-violent actions in the department. In 2001, he created the position of Peace Commissioner, naming Gilberto Echeverri Mejía to this post.

From April 17 to 21, 2002, accompanied by Commissioner Echeverri, Gaviria Correa led a 120-kilometer (85-mile) non-violent march for reconciliation and solidarity with the municipality of Caicedo, a town in western Antioquia that had been besieged by guerrillas and paramilitaries since 1995. The march began in Medellin with over a thousand civilians, and was attended by several mayors of Antioquia, as well as internationally known nonviolence leaders such Bernard Lafayette.

As the march neared Caicedo on April 21, FARC guerrillas confronted the march, kidnapping the governor and his peace commissioner. For over a year, the two men were held hostage deep in the jungle. On May 5, 2003, after a year in captivity, Gaviria Correa was killed by the FARC, along with Echeverri and eight other captives, during an attempted rescue by Colombian armed forces.

== Writings ==
During his year in captivity, Gaviria Correa kept journals and wrote frequent letters to his two children and his wife Yolanda Pinto de Gaviria, centered on his love for them and his hopes for reconciliation among Colombians. These writings became a book, and were later translated to English as Diary of a Kidnapped Colombian Governor.

Weeks before his death, Gaviria Correa wrote these lines in his final letter to his father:

Our task, if we hope for a new Antioquia, is to open the doors to all the possibilities that nonviolence offers and to incorporate them in the different segments of community life – family, education, relationships among people, communities, and nations – overcoming poverty and inequalities to build a new nation based on human principles.

In an open letter to the people of Antioquia, written before setting out on the fateful march to Caicedo, Gaviria Correa explained his motives as well as his understanding of the risks involved:

Dear People of Antioquia:

The trust you placed in me as your Governor obliges me to seek, without rest, the roads to overcome the pain that the use of violence and injustice cause to our people. This search has moved me to undertake the Nonviolent March of Reconciliation and Solidarity with the people of Caicedo. With this pilgrimage I invite you to apply the strategy of nonviolence.

The philosophy of nonviolence brings spirits closer, brings souls closer, brings human beings closer and will allow us, together, to build true roads to social transformation. Nonviolence is not simply saying no to violence, because if so it would end up being confused with passively accepting suffering, injustice and abuse. Nonviolence is a way to overcome violence, investigating and discovering just means to oppose injustice. Nonviolence is not only about neutralizing all forms of direct violence, but also all manifestations of structural violence, because it builds peace through justice and solidarity and helps to prevent future forms of violence, by offering methods and models of peaceful struggle to those social groups left out and sacrificed by unbalanced power and systemic maladjustment.

If you are reading this letter it is surely because the FARC were not able to listen or understand my message. If I have been murdered, my spirit will be praying for peace in Colombia. In this case I hope that Aníbal, my brother, will take up the flag I have been carrying to build a new Antioquia.

== Legacy ==
In the first election after Gaviria Correa's death, his brother Aníbal Gaviria did in fact run and was in fact elected as Governor of Antioquia. After pursuing the same programs begun by his older brother in 2000, Aníbal was selected 2007's best Governor in Colombia by Colombia Líder, a national nonpartisan institute. Specific accomplishments cited included extending health coverage to 1.6 million inhabitants, providing new or improved housing for 110,000 low-income families, building schools for 90,000 additional elementary and intermediate students, increasing access to potable water from 24 to 96 municipalities, and a reduction of over 60% in the murder rate during his term.

Varying opinions exist on the legacy of Gaviria Correa's movement of nonviolence. In the years following his death, violence decreased markedly. However, most Colombians attributed this improvement not to nonviolence, but to the opposite: namely, strong military offensives by President Álvaro Uribe against the FARC, paramilitary, and other narco-terrorist groups.

On the other hand Gaviria Correa's writing, and his story of personal sacrifice, continue to inspire those involved in the cause of nonviolence. In nominating Gaviria Correa for the 2004 Nobel Peace Prize, for instance, nonviolence scholar Glenn D. Paige described him as "a nonviolent political leader whose legacy is no less significant than those of Gandhi and Martin Luther King, Jr." According to Nobel Peace Prize winner Mairead Maguire, "Governor Gaviria’s writings reveal a brave and deeply spiritual man, whose compassionate heart and fine mind were not corrupted by suffering, but deepened to an all-encompassing unconditional love of everyone, including his captors."

== See also ==
- List of kidnappings
