= 2018–19 in Portuguese futsal =

2018–19 in Portuguese futsal details the events and happenings in Portuguese futsal for the 2018&ndash:19 season.

== UEFA Competitions ==
=== UEFA Futsal Champions League ===
==== Main Round ====
===== Path A =====
====== Group 1 ======
Pos	Team	Pld	W	D	L	GF	GA	GD	Pts	Qualification
1	(Portugal) Benfica	3	2	1	0	15	5	+10	7	Elite round
2	(Spain) Barcelona	3	2	1	0	12	6	+6	7	Elite round
3	(Belgium) Halle-Gooik (H)	3	1	0	2	15	16	−1	3	Elite round
4	(France) Kremlin-Bicêtre United	3	0	0	3	7	22	−15	0	

Source: UEFA
Rules for classification: Qualifying tiebreakers
(H) Hosts

3 October 2018	Halle-Gooik (Belgium)	3–5	(Portugal) Benfica	Sportcomplex De Bres, Halle
20:00	Diogo 24:24; Patias 32:09; B. Coelho 35:53 (o.g.)	Report	Fits 5:22, 32:33; A. Coelho 21:14, 30:13; B. Coelho 25:59	Referee: Ondřej Černý (Czech Republic), Vladimir Kadykov (Russia)

4 October 2018	Benfica (Portugal)	1–1	(Spain) Barcelona	Sportcomplex De Bres, Halle
17:30	Cecílio 30:19	Report	Esquerdinha 35:16	Referee: Vladimir Kadykov (Russia), Balázs Farkas (Hungary)

6 October 2018	Kremlin-Bicêtre United (France)	1–9	(Portugal) Benfica	Sportcomplex De Bres, Halle
17:30	Saliou 9:48	Report	Tolrà 4:45; Robinho 15:51, 23:16, 32:14; Campos 25:03, 34:38; Henmi 26:12; Fits 32:51, 39:16	Referee: Christos Christou (Cyprus), Vladimir Kadykov (Russia)

====== Group 4 ======
Pos	Team	Pld	W	D	L	GF	GA	GD	Pts	Qualification
1	(Kazakhstan) Kairat	3	3	0	0	15	4	+11	9	Elite round
2	(Portugal) Sporting CP	3	2	0	1	9	4	+5	6	Elite round
3	(Belarus) Lidselmash Lida	3	1	0	2	5	11	−6	3	Elite round
4	(Kosovo) Feniks (H)	3	0	0	3	5	15	−10	0	

Source: UEFA
Rules for classification: Qualifying tiebreakers
(H) Hosts

3 October 2018	Sporting CP (Portugal)	3–2	(Belarus) Lidselmash Lida	Palace of Youth and Sports, Pristina
18:00	Leo 0:56; Cavinato 7:46; Dieguinho 9:13	Report	Zhigalko 30:28; Voronin 38:41	Referee: Cédric Pelissier (France), Elchin Samadli (Azerbaijan)

4 October 2018	Kairat (Kazakhstan)	2–1	(Portugal) Sporting CP	Palace of Youth and Sports, Pristina
18:00	Taynan 4:49; Pereira 11:13	Report	Erick 14:00	Referee: Alessandro Malfer (Italy), Cédric Pelissier (France)

6 October 2018	Sporting CP (Portugal)	5–0	(Kosovo) Feniks	Palace of Youth and Sports, Pristina
20:30	Cavinato 15:11, 24:41; Rocha 34:07; Deo 36:21; Erick 37:44	Report		Referee: Juan José Cordero Gallardo (Spain), Alessandro Malfer (Italy)

==== Elite round ====
===== Group C =====
Pos	Team	Pld	W	D	L	GF	GA	GD	Pts	Qualification
1	(Portugal) Sporting CP (H)	3	2	1	0	11	1	+10	7	Final tournament
2	(Portugal) Benfica	3	2	1	0	10	3	+7	7	
3	(Russia) Sibiryak	3	1	0	2	5	9	−4	3	
4	(Croatia) Novo Vrijeme	3	0	0	3	1	14	−13	0	

Source: UEFA
Rules for classification: Qualifying tiebreakers
(H) Hosts

15 November 2018	Benfica (Portugal)	5–0	(Croatia) Novo Vrijeme	Pavilhão João Rocha, Lisbon
15:00 (14:00 WET)	Cecílio 7:01; Campos 9:07, 18:44, 28:57; Robinho 22:51	Report		Referee: Juan José Cordero Gallardo (Spain), Alejandro Martinez Flores (Spain)

15 November 2018	Sporting CP (Portugal)	4–0	(Russia) Sibiryak	Pavilhão João Rocha, Lisbon
21:30 (20:30 WET)	Cardinal 6:41; Deo 15:03; Dieguinho 20:52, 29:00	Report		Referee: Ondřej Černý (Czech Republic), Cédric Pelissier (France)

16 November 2018	Sibiryak (Russia)	2–4	(Portugal) Benfica	Pavilhão João Rocha, Lisbon
15:00 (14:00 WET)	Balashov 22:40; Pokotylo 37:48	Report	B. Coelho 7:47, 24'00; Robinho 11:24; Chaguinha 28:41	Referee: Alejandro Martinez Flores (Spain), Juan José Cordero Gallardo (Spain)

16 November 2018	Sporting CP (Portugal)	6–0	(Croatia) Novo Vrijeme	Pavilhão João Rocha, Lisbon
21:30 (20:30 WET)	P. Cary 1:23; Dieguinho 4:01, 30:39; Rocha 11:07; Alex 15:39; Erick 27:26	Report		Referee: Cédric Pelissier (France), Ondřej Černý (Czech Republic)

18 November 2018	Benfica (Portugal)	1–1	(Portugal) Sporting CP	Pavilhão João Rocha, Lisbon
20:00 (19:00 WET)	Robinho 11:28	Report	Cardinal 17:16 (2pen.)	Referee: Juan José Cordero Gallardo (Spain), Alejandro Martinez Flores (Spain)

==== Final tournament ====
===== Semi-finals =====
26 April 2019	Sporting CP (Portugal)	5–3	(Spain) Inter FS	Almaty Arena, Almaty
14:45 (18:45 ALMT)	Deo 5:25; Dieguinho 23:41, 29:34, 35:57; Cardinal 39:38	Report	Pedro Cary 5:16 (o.g.); Bebe 37:00; Gadeia 39:41	Attendance: 6,700; Referee: Marc Birkett (England), Kamil Çetin (Turkey)

===== Final =====
28 April 2019
16:00 (20:00 ALMT)

Sporting CP (Portugal)	2–1	(Kazakhstan) Kairat
Cavinato 21:17; Merlim 26:49	Report	Douglas Júnior 37:39

Almaty Arena, Almaty
Attendance: 11,973
Referee: Saša Tomić (Croatia), Nikola Jelić (Croatia)

== Men's futsal ==
=== Campeonato Nacional da I Divisão ===
Campeonato Nacional da I Divisão de Futsal
- Season: 2018–19
- Dates: 15 September 2018 – June 2019
- Champions: Benfica
- Relegated: Unidos Pinheirense; Rio Ave
- UEFA Futsal Champions League: Benfica; Sporting CP

The 2018-19 season of the Campeonato Nacional da I Divisão de Futsal will be the 29th season of top-tier futsal in Portugal. It will be named Liga Sport Zone for sponsorship reasons. The regular season started on September 15, 2018, and will end in April 2019. After the end of the regular season, the top eight teams will play the championship playoffs.

Viseu 2001 and Eléctrico FC will participate for the first time in their history in the Liga Portuguesa de Futsal after being promoted from the II Divisão de Futsal.

==== Teams ====
Location of teams in Liga Sport Zone 2016-17

Team	Location	Stadium	Capacity
Belenenses	Lisbon	Pavilhão Acácio Rosa	1683
Benfica	Lisbon	Pavilhão Fidelidade	2400
Braga/AAUM	Braga	Pavilhão Desportivo Universitário de Gualtar	1740
Burinhosa	Burinhosa	Pavilhão Gimnodesportivo da Burinhosa	300
Eléctrico FC	Ponte de Sor	Pavilhão Gimnodesportivo de Ponte de Sor	720
Fundão	Fundão	Pavilhão Municipal do Fundão	1056
Futsal Azeméis	Oliveira de Azeméis	Pavilhão Municipal de Oliveira de Azeméis	250
Leões Porto Salvo	Porto Salvo	Pavilhão dos Leões de Porto Salvo	660
Modicus Sandim	Sandim	Pavilhão do Modicus	700
Quinta dos Lombos	Quinta dos Lombos	Pavilhão Desportivo dos Lombos	650
Rio Ave	Vila do Conde	Pavilhão Municipal de Desportos	800
Sporting CP	Lisbon	Pavilhão João Rocha	3000
Unidos Pinheirense	Valbom	Pavilhão Municipal de Valbom	500
Viseu 2001	Viseu	Pavilhão Desportivo Cidade de Viseu	1200

==== League table ====
Pos	Team	Pld	W	D	L	GF	GA	GD	Pts	Qualification or relegation
1	Benfica	26	25	0	1	149	35	+114	75	Advance to play-off stage
2	Sporting CP	26	24	1	1	138	43	+95	73	Advance to play-off stage
3	Modicus Sandim	26	15	3	8	87	79	+8	48	Advance to play-off stage
4	Fundão	26	14	2	10	90	79	+11	44	Advance to play-off stage
5	Leões Porto Salvo	26	13	3	10	95	88	+7	42	Advance to play-off stage
6	Braga/AAUM	26	11	5	10	71	72	−1	38	Advance to play-off stage
7	Quinta dos Lombos	26	9	6	11	71	87	−16	33	Advance to play-off stage
8	Eléctrico FC	26	9	5	12	87	89	−2	32	Advance to play-off stage
9	Futsal Azeméis	26	7	6	13	80	107	−27	27	
10	Belenenses	26	7	5	14	68	84	−16	26	
11	Burinhosa	26	8	2	16	70	93	−23	26	
12	Viseu 2001	26	6	3	17	81	130	−49	21	
13	Unidos Pinheirense (R)	26	6	2	18	56	122	−66	20	Relegation to Campeonato Nacional da II Divisão
14	Rio Ave (R)	26	4	5	17	64	99	−35	17	Relegation to Campeonato Nacional da II Divisão

Updated to match(es) played on 21 April 2019. Source: http://resultados.fpf.pt/Competition/Details?competitionId=13163
Rules for classification: 1) Points; 2) Head-to-head points; 3) Head-to-head goal difference; 4) Head-to-head away goals scored; 5) Matches won; 6) Goal difference; 7) Goals scored; 8) Goals conceded 9) Average age; 10) Disciplinary points.
(R) Relegated

==== Play-off stage ====
Quarter-finals
1 Benfica	6	5	-
8 Eléctrico FC	4	0	-
4 Fundão	3	4	4 (7)
5 Leões Porto Salvo	0	6	4 (6)
2 Sporting CP	5	5	-
7 Quinta dos Lombos	3	0	-
3 Modicus Sandim	3	2	3
6 Braga/AAUM	6	1	2

Semi-finals
1 Benfica	7	3	7
4 Fundão	1	5	3
2 Sporting CP	4	4	7
3 Modicus Sandim	5	1	0

Final
1 Benfica	4	6	4	3	4
2 Sporting CP	5	3	3	5	3

=== Taça de Portugal ===
==== Bracket ====
Round of 32
Olho Marinho	2
Portimonense	7
Sassoeiros	0
Modicus Sandim	4
Albufeira	8
Nun'Álvares	4
Amarense	2
Burinhosa	8
Paredes	4
Macedence	5
Elétrico	1
Sporting CP	3
Domus Nostra	0
Belenenses	9
Candoso	2
Leões de Porto Salvo	4
Nogueiró Tenões	0
Braga/AAUM	3
CS São João	0
Benfica	8
MTBA	5
São Mateus	4
Viseu 2001	3
Quinta dos Lombos	7
Caxinas	4
Unidos Pinheirense	2
CD Aves	0
Fundão	5
Marítimo	3 (4)
Rio Ave	3 (5)
Farense	5
Futsal Azeméis	6

Round of 16
Portimonense	2
Modicus Sandim	5
Albufeira	2
Burinhosa	4
Macedense	0
Sporting CP	7
Belenenses	1
Leões de Porto Salvo	0
Braga/AAUM	3
Benfica	4
MTBA	2
Quinta dos Lombos	6
Caxinas	1
Fundão	3
Rio Ave	2
Futsal Azeméis	4

Quarter-finals
Modicus Sandim	5 (7)
Burinhosa	5 (8)
Sporting CP	2
Belenenses	1
Benfica	4
Quinta dos Lombos	1
Fundão	7
Futsal Azeméis	2

Semi-finals
Burinhosa	2
Sporting CP	3
Benfica	2
Fundão	1

Final
Sporting CP	5 (3)
Benfica	5 (2)

==== Final ====
31 March 2019
17:00

Sporting CP	5–5 (a.e.t.)	Benfica
Dieguinho 11'; Cardinal 19'; Cavinato 23'; Merlim 25'; Marc Tolrà 47' (o.g.)	Report	Marc Tolrà 2'; Robinho 9'; Fernandinho 16', 44'; Diego Rocaglio 32'
Penalties
Cardinal (penalty scored); Dieguinho (penalty scored); Merlim (penalty scored)	3–2	(penalty scored) Fernandinho; (penalty scored) Marc Tolrà; (penalty missed) Robinho

Pavilhão Multiusos de Gondomar, Gondomar
Attendance: 3,000
Referee: Filipe Duarte, António Almeida

=== Taça da Liga ===
==== Bracket ====
Quarter-finals
10 January
Eléctrico FC	3 (5)
Sporting CP	3 (4)
11 January
Fundão	1 (1)
Braga/AAUM	1 (3)
10 January
Leões Porto Salvo	3 (7)
Modicus Sandim	3 (8)
11 January
Futsal Azeméis	1
Benfica	7

Semi-finals
12 January
Eléctrico FC	1
Braga/AAUM	4
12 January
Modicus Sandim	2
Benfica	6

Final
13 January
Braga/AAUM	0
Benfica	3

==== Final ====
13 January 2019
19:00

Braga/AAUM	0–3	Benfica
	Report	Fernandinho 14'; Fábio Cecílio 20'; Raúl Campos 33'

Pavilhão Multiusos de Sines, Sines
Attendance: 1,600
Referee: Eduardo Coelho, Rúben Santos

=== Supertaça ===
8 September 2018
14:20

Sporting CP	11–0	Fabril
Diego Cavinato 2', 28'; Dieguinho 5', 7'; Pany Varela 6', 40'; Alex Merlim 9', 10', 32'; Daniel Machado 30'; Pedro Cary 40'	Report

Pavilhão Municipal de Loulé, Loulé
Referee: Cristiano Santos, Rúben Santos

== See also ==
- Futsal in Portugal
