= 2018–19 UEFA Futsal Champions League =

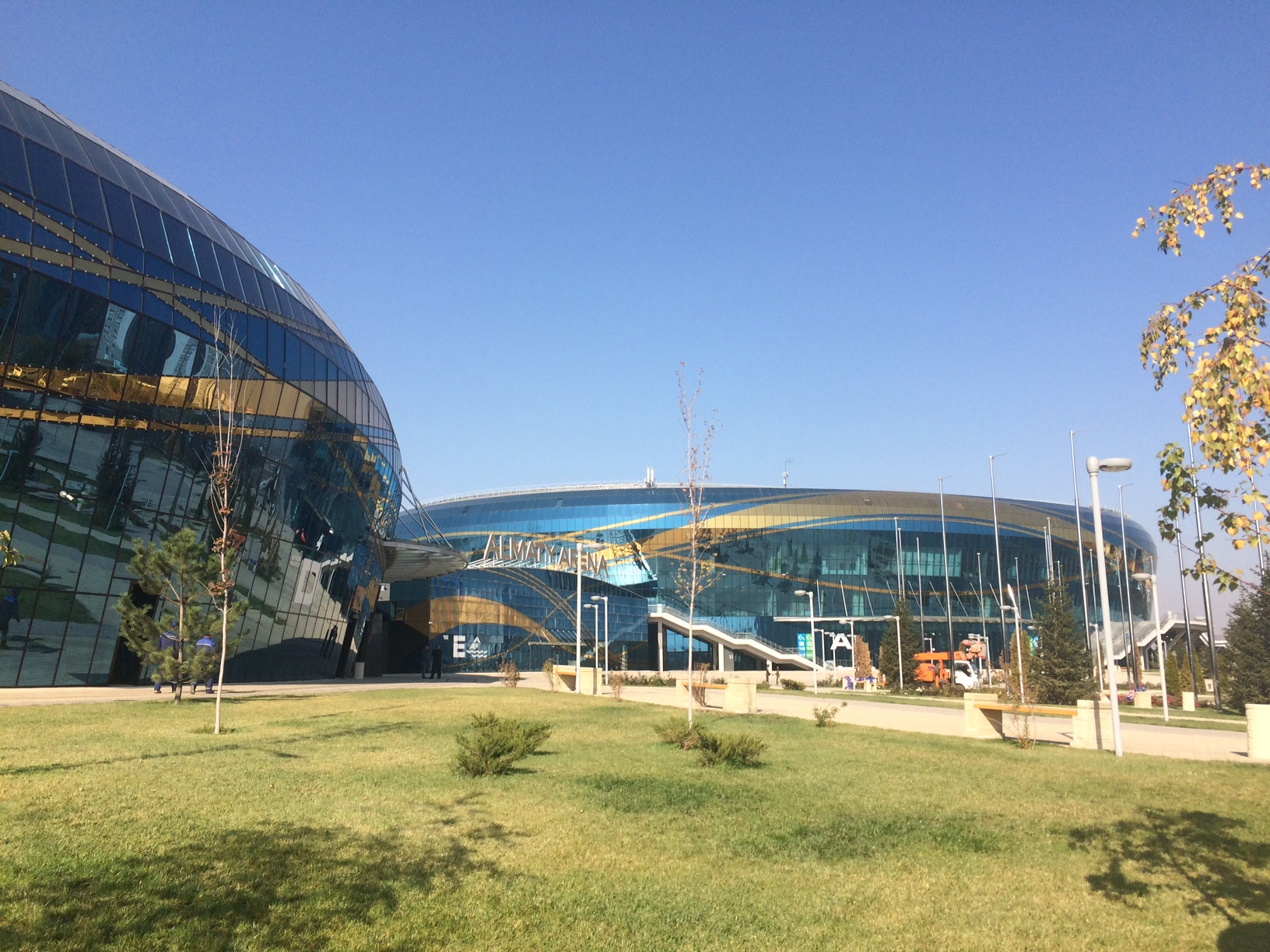
- The Almaty Arena in Almaty hosted the final tournament

Tournament details
- Dates: Qualifying rounds: 28 August – 18 November 2018; Final tournament: 26–28 April 2019
- Teams: Final tournament: 4 Total: 57 (from 53 associations)

Final positions
- Champions: (Portugal) Sporting CP (1st title)
- Runners-up: (Kazakhstan) Kairat
- Third place: (Spain) Barcelona
- Fourth place: (Spain) Inter FS

Tournament statistics
- Matches played: 124
- Goals scored: 828 (6.68 per match)
- Top scorer(s): Season total: (Poland) Michał Kubik (10 goals); Final tournament: (Brazil) Dieguinho (3 goals)

The 2018–19 UEFA Futsal Champions League was the 33rd edition of Europe's premier club futsal tournament, and the 18th edition organized by UEFA. It was also the first edition since the tournament was rebranded from "UEFA Futsal Cup" to "UEFA Futsal Champions League". The final tournament took place at the Almaty Arena in Almaty, Kazakhstan on 26–28 April 2019.

Two-time defending champions Inter FS were unable to defend their title as they succumbed 5–3 to Sporting CP in the semi-finals. Appearing in their third consecutive final, Sporting CP defeated final tournament hosts Kairat 2–1 to claim their first title in the competition. Barcelona beat Inter FS 3–1 to finish in the third place.

== Association team allocation ==
The format remained the same as the previous season, as the top three-ranked associations according to the UEFA Futsal National Team coefficient rankings can enter two teams. The title holders qualified automatically, and thus their association could also enter a second team. If the title holders were from the top three-ranked associations, the fourth-ranked association can also enter two teams. All other associations could enter one team (the winners of their regular top domestic futsal league, or in special circumstances, the runners-up).

=== Association ranking ===
For this season, the associations were allocated places according to the coefficient ranking of their men's senior national teams, calculated based on the following:

- UEFA Futsal Euro 2016 final tournament and qualifying competition
- 2016 FIFA Futsal World Cup final tournament and qualifying competition
- UEFA Futsal Euro 2018 final tournament and qualifying competition

Since the winners of the 2017–18 UEFA Futsal Cup, Inter FS, were from the top three-ranked associations, the fourth-ranked association could also enter two teams. As a result, Spain, Portugal, Russia and Kazakhstan entered two teams.

Association ranking for 2018–19 UEFA Futsal Champions League

Rank	Association	Coeff.	Teams
1	Russia	10.171	2
2	Spain	10.022	2
3	Portugal	9.633	2
4	Kazakhstan	9.000	2
5	Ukraine	8.389	1
6	Azerbaijan	7.822	1
7	Italy	7.444	1
8	Serbia	6.833	1
9	Slovenia	6.500	1
10	Croatia	4.278	1
11	Hungary	4.111	1
12	Czech Republic	3.611	1
13	Romania	3.500	1
14	Poland	3.389	1
15	France	2.944	1
16	Slovakia	2.944	1
17	Belarus	2.889	1
18	Netherlands	2.278	1
19	Bosnia and Herzegovina	2.222	1

Rank	Association	Coeff.	Teams
20	Belgium	2.111	1
21	Georgia	2.056	1
22	Macedonia	2.000	1
23	Finland	1.694	1
24	Latvia	1.222	1
25	Turkey	1.222	1
26	Moldova	0.833	1
27	England	0.833	1
28	Albania	0.778	1
29	Sweden	0.778	1
30	Montenegro	0.722	1
31	Denmark	0.722	1
32	Norway	0.722	1
33	Kosovo	0.667	1
34	Switzerland	0.583	1
35	Bulgaria	0.556	1
36	Armenia	0.500	1
37	Greece	0.500	1

Rank	Association	Coeff.	Teams
38	Germany	0.500	1
39	Wales	0.389	1
40	Lithuania	0.389	1
41	Cyprus	0.389	1
42	Israel	0.278	1
43	Andorra	0.222	1
44	Estonia	0.111	1
45	Malta	0.000	1
46	Gibraltar	0.000	1
47	San Marino	0.000	1
48	Scotland	0.000	1
NR	Austria	0.000	1
NR	Iceland	0.000	1
NR	Luxembourg	0.000	1
NR	Northern Ireland	0.000	1
NR	Republic of Ireland	0.000	1
NR	Faroe Islands	0.000	DNE
NR	Liechtenstein	0.000	DNE

Notes

- TH – Additional berth for title holders
- NR – No rank (association did not enter in any of the competitions used for computing coefficients)
- DNE – Did not enter

=== Distribution ===
Following expansion of the tournament, the top-ranked teams no longer receive byes to the elite round, and the number of teams in the main round is increased from 24 to 32. Teams are ranked according to their UEFA club coefficients, computed based on results of the last three seasons, to decide on the round they enter:

- The title holders and the teams ranked 1–22 or 23 (depending on the number of entries) enter the main round, divided into Path A and Path B.
  - Path A contains the title holders and the teams ranked 1–11 and 16–19, and the 16 teams are drawn into four groups of four. The top three teams of each group advance to the elite round.
  - Path B contains the teams ranked 12–15 and 20–22 or 23, and together with the preliminary round qualifiers (8 or 9 teams), the 16 teams are drawn into four groups of four. The winners of each group advance to the elite round.
- The remaining lowest-ranked teams enter the preliminary round, and are drawn into groups of three or four. The winners of each group and possibly one or more best runners-up advance to main round Path B.

The elite round remains to be contested by 16 teams (twelve teams from Path A and four teams from Path B), drawn into four groups of four, where the group winners and runners-up from main round Path A are seeded into the top two pots and kept apart if they are from the same group. The winners of each group advance to the final tournament, which is played in the same knockout format between four teams as before.

=== Teams ===
A record total of 57 teams from 53 associations entered this season's competition. Two associations had no league as of 2017–18 (Faroe Islands, Liechtenstein).

The 23 highest-ranked teams entered the main round, while the 34 lowest-ranked teams entered the preliminary round. The coefficient ranking was also used for seeding in the preliminary round and main round draws, where each team was assigned a seeding position according to their ranking for the respective draw. Nine teams were pre-selected as hosts for the preliminary round and eight teams were pre-selected as hosts for the main round.

The draws for the preliminary round and main round were held on 5 July 2018, 14:15 CEST (UTC+2), at the UEFA headquarters in Nyon, Switzerland. The mechanism of the draws for each round is as follows:

- In the preliminary round, the 34 teams were drawn into nine groups: seven groups of four containing one team from each of the seeding positions 1–4, and two groups of three containing one team from each of the seeding positions 1–3. First, the nine teams which were pre-selected as hosts were drawn from their own designated pot and allocated to their respective group as per their seeding positions. Next, the remaining 25 teams were drawn from their respective pot which were allocated according to their seeding positions.
- In the main round Path B, the 16 teams were drawn into four groups of four, containing one team from each of the seeding positions 1–4. First, the four teams which were pre-selected as hosts were drawn from their own designated pot and allocated to their respective group as per their seeding positions. Next, the remaining 12 teams were drawn from their respective pot which were allocated according to their seeding positions (including the nine preliminary round winners, whose identity was not known at the time of the draw, which were allocated to first seeding position 4, then seeding position 3, then seeding position 2). Based on the decisions taken by the UEFA Emergency Panel, should a team from Armenia advance from the preliminary round and qualify for a main round group with a team from Azerbaijan, they would be swapped with the preliminary round group winner in seeding position 4 of the next main round group.
- In the main round Path A, the 16 teams were drawn into four groups of four, containing one team from each of the seeding positions 1–4. First, the four teams which were pre-selected as hosts were drawn from their own designated pot and allocated to their respective group as per their seeding positions. Next, the remaining 12 teams were drawn from their respective pot which were allocated according to their seeding positions. Teams from the same association could be drawn into the same group. Based on the decisions taken by the UEFA Emergency Panel, teams from Russia and Ukraine would not be drawn into the same group.

Legend

- TH: Futsal Cup title holders
- CH: National champions
- RU: National runners-up
- (H): Preliminary and main round hosts

Qualified teams for 2018–19 UEFA Futsal Champions League

Teams entering main round
Rank	Team	Coeff.	Path	Seed
TH	(Spain) Inter FS (CH)	73.334	A	1
1	(Portugal) Sporting CP (CH)	47.333	A	1
2	(Russia) Gazprom-Ugra Yugorsk (CH)	41.000	A	1
3	(Spain) Barcelona (RU)	36.001	A	1
4	(Portugal) Benfica (RU)	29.333	A	2
5	(Kazakhstan) Kairat (CH)	28.500	A	2
6	(Hungary) Berettyóújfalu (RU)	23.001	A	2
7	(Serbia) Ekonomac (CH) (H)	20.501	A	2
8	(Belgium) Halle-Gooik (CH) (H)	17.000	A	3
9	(Russia) Sibiryak (RU)	17.000	A	3
10	(Czech Republic) Era-Pack Chrudim (CH)	14.501	A	3
11	(Belarus) Lidselmash Lida (CH)	12.834	A	3
12	(Latvia) Nikars (CH) (H)	12.000	B	1
13	(Italy) Acqua e Sapone (CH)	10.667	B	1
14	(Azerbaijan) Araz Naxçivan (CH)	10.500	B	1
15	(Kazakhstan) Aktobe (RU)	9.500	B	1
16	(Slovenia) Dobovec (CH) (H)	8.167	A	4
17	(Ukraine) Prodexim Kherson (CH)	8.167	A	4
18	(France) Kremlin-Bicêtre United (CH)	8.167	A	4
19	(Kosovo) Feniks (CH) (H)	5.833	A	4
20	(Croatia) Novo Vrijeme (CH) (H)	5.501	B	2
21	(Cyprus) APOEL (CH) (H)	4.834	B	2
22	(Slovakia) MIMEL Lučenec (RU) (H)	4.167	B	2

Teams entering preliminary round
Rank	Team	Coeff.	Seed
23	(Romania) Informatica Timişoara (CH) (H)	4.000	1
24	(Bosnia and Herzegovina) Mostar SG Staklorad (CH) (H)	3.501	1
25	(Armenia) Leo (CH)	3.250	1
26	(North Macedonia) Veles (CH) (H)	3.167	1
27	(Germany) Hohenstein-Ernstthal (CH) (H)	3.084	1
28	(Poland) Rekord Bielsko-Biała (CH) (H)	2.834	1
29	(Netherlands) Hovocubo (CH)	2.667	1
30	(Georgia (country)) Tatishvili (CH)	2.501	1
31	(Norway) Sandefjord (CH)	2.250	1
32	(Finland) Kampuksen Dynamo (CH)	2.167	2
33	(Sweden) Uddevalla (CH) (H)	2.084	2
34	(Denmark) JB Gentofte (CH)	2.084	2
35	(Malta) Valletta (CH)	1.583	2
36	(Bulgaria) Varna City (CH)	1.583	2
37	(Greece) Doukas (CH)	1.500	2
38	(England) Reading Escolla (CH)	1.334	2
39	(Moldova) Dinamo Chişinău (CH) (H)	1.167	2
40	(Gibraltar) Lynx (CH)	1.001	2
41	(Montenegro) Čelik (CH)	1.001	3
42	(Switzerland) RCD Fidell (CH)	0.834	3
43	(Turkey) Osmanlıspor (CH)	0.667	3
44	(Lithuania) Vytis (CH) (H)	0.583	3
45	(Israel) Maccabi Nahalat Itzhak (CH)	0.583	3
46	(Austria) Murexin Allstars (CH) (H)	0.500	3
47	(Albania) Tirana (CH)	0.334	3
48	(Republic of Ireland) Futsamba Naas (CH)	0.334	3
49	(Wales) Cardiff University (CH)	0.251	3
50	(Andorra) Encamp (CH)	0.251	4
51	Racing Luxembourg (CH)	0.250	4
52	(Estonia) Tallinna Cosmos (CH)	0.167	4
53	(San Marino) Murata (CH)	0.167	4
54	(Scotland) Wattcell (CH)	0.000	4
55	(Northern Ireland) Belfast United (CH)	0.000	4
56	(Iceland) Vængir Júpiters (CH)	0.000	4

Notes

1. Hungary (HUN): Hungarian champions Győri ETO (coefficient 23.001) were entered into the main round draw, but withdrew afterwards due to financial problems, and so runners-up Berettyóújfalu replaced them in the competition.
2. Slovakia (SVK): Slovak champions Slov-Matic Bratislava withdrew from the league due to financial problems, and so the berth was given to runners-up MIMEL Lučenec.
3. Turkey (TUR): Osmanlıspor were confirmed as Turkish champions after the preliminary round draw.

== Format ==
In the preliminary round, main round, and elite round, each group was played as a round-robin mini-tournament at the pre-selected hosts.

In the final tournament, the four qualified teams played in knockout format (semi-finals, third place match, and final), either at a host selected by UEFA from one of the teams, or at a neutral venue if none of the teams wished to host.

=== Tiebreakers ===
In the preliminary round, main round, and elite round, teams were ranked according to points (3 points for a win, 1 point for a draw, 0 points for a loss), and if tied on points, the following tiebreaking criteria were applied, in the order given, to determine the rankings (Regulations Articles 14.01 and 14.02):

1. Points in head-to-head matches among tied teams;
2. Goal difference in head-to-head matches among tied teams;
3. Goals scored in head-to-head matches among tied teams;
4. If more than two teams are tied, and after applying all head-to-head criteria above, a subset of teams are still tied, all head-to-head criteria above are reapplied exclusively to this subset of teams;
5. Goal difference in all group matches;
6. Goals scored in all group matches;
7. Penalty shoot-out if only two teams have the same number of points, and they met in the last round of the group and are tied after applying all criteria above (not used if more than two teams have the same number of points, or if their rankings are not relevant for qualification for the next stage);
8. Disciplinary points (red card = 3 points, yellow card = 1 point, expulsion for two yellow cards in one match = 3 points);
9. UEFA club coefficient;
10. Drawing of lots.

== Schedule ==
The schedule of the competition is as follows.

Schedule for 2018–19 UEFA Futsal Champions League
Round	Draw	Dates
Preliminary round	5 July 2018	28 August – 2 September 2018
Main round	5 July 2018	2–7 October 2018
Elite round	12 October 2018	13–18 November 2018
Final tournament	1 February 2019	Semi-finals: 26 April 2019; Third place match & Final: 28 April 2019

In the preliminary round, main round and elite round, the schedule of each group is as follows, with one rest day between matchdays 2 and 3 for four-team groups, and no rest days for three-team groups (Regulations Articles 19.04, 19.05 and 19.06):

Note: For scheduling, the hosts are considered as Team 1, while the visiting teams are considered as Team 2, Team 3, and Team 4 according to their coefficient rankings.

Group schedule
Matchday	Matches (4 teams)	Matches (3 teams)
Matchday 1	2 v 4, 1 v 3	1 v 3
Matchday 2	3 v 2, 1 v 4	3 v 2
Matchday 3	4 v 3, 2 v 1	2 v 1

== Preliminary round ==
The winners of each group advance to the main round Path B to join the seven teams which receive byes (another 16 teams receive byes to the main round Path A).

Times are CEST (UTC+2), as listed by UEFA (local times, if different, are in parentheses).

=== Group A ===
Pos	Team	Pld	W	D	L	GF	GA	GD	Pts	Qualification
1	(Bosnia and Herzegovina) Mostar SG Staklorad (H)	3	3	0	0	17	5	+12	9	Main round
2	(Denmark) JB Gentofte	3	2	0	1	15	4	+11	6	
3	(Israel) Maccabi Nahalat Itzhak	3	1	0	2	9	15	−6	3	
4	(Scotland) Wattcell	3	0	0	3	7	24	−17	0	

Source: UEFA
Rules for classification: Qualifying tiebreakers
(H) Hosts
29 August 2018
19:00

JB Gentofte (Denmark)	6–0	(Scotland) Wattcell
Jørgensen 5:28; Veis 7:49, 30:25; Falck 10:39; V. Hansen 37:21; O. Hansen 38:49	Report

USRC Midhat Hujdur Hujka, Mostar
Referee: Ramil Namazov (Azerbaijan), Viktor Bugenko (Moldova)
29 August 2018
21:15

Mostar SG Staklorad (Bosnia and Herzegovina)	4–0	(Israel) Maccabi Nahalat Itzhak
Hugo 0:53; Vesić 14:10; Kahvedžić 31:51; Galić 39:34	Report

USRC Midhat Hujdur Hujka, Mostar
Referee: Michael Christofides (Cyprus), Norbert Szilágyi (Hungary)

30 August 2018
19:00

Maccabi Nahalat Itzhak (Israel)	1–8	(Denmark) JB Gentofte
Weiss 31:14	Report	El-Ouaz 2:05; Jørgensen 7:44, 15:55; Veis 15:45, 31:53; Falck 20:57; Shkolnik 28:30; O. Hansen 36:22

USRC Midhat Hujdur Hujka, Mostar
Referee: Viktor Bugenko (Moldova), Michael Christofides (Cyprus)
30 August 2018
21:15

Mostar SG Staklorad (Bosnia and Herzegovina)	10–4	(Scotland) Wattcell
Aladžić 1:17, 14:05, 23:10; Hrkać 5:05; Vesić 12:32; Hugo 14:59, 22:54, 35:57; Kahvedžić 18:47, 34:49	Report	Del Moral 8:32; Kader 17:54, 28:36; Mollison 19:38

USRC Midhat Hujdur Hujka, Mostar
Referee: Norbert Szilágyi (Hungary), Ramil Namazov (Azerbaijan)

1 September 2018
14:00

Wattcell (Scotland)	3–8	(Israel) Maccabi Nahalat Itzhak
Forsyth 6:20, 39:18; Guthrie 8:23	Report	Weiss 4:04, 14:18, 32:23, 37:53, 38:02; Stunis 4:35; Goldstein 24:24, 33:18

USRC Midhat Hujdur Hujka, Mostar
Referee: Norbert Szilágyi (Hungary), Michael Christofides (Cyprus)
1 September 2018
20:00

JB Gentofte (Denmark)	1–3	(Bosnia and Herzegovina) Mostar SG Staklorad
Veis 16:24	Report	Kahvedžić 21:24; Rakić 21:54; Vesić 29:58

USRC Midhat Hujdur Hujka, Mostar
Referee: Viktor Bugenko (Moldova), Ramil Namazov (Azerbaijan)

=== Group B ===
Pos	Team	Pld	W	D	L	GF	GA	GD	Pts	Qualification
1	(Finland) Kampuksen Dynamo	3	3	0	0	15	1	+14	9	Main round
2	(Austria) Murexin Allstars (H)	3	2	0	1	14	10	+4	6	
3	(Norway) Sandefjord	3	1	0	2	4	8	−4	3	
4	(Andorra) Encamp	3	0	0	3	5	19	−14	0	

Source: UEFA
Rules for classification: Qualifying tiebreakers
(H) Hosts
29 August 2018
18:00

Sandefjord (Norway)	2–1	(Andorra) Encamp
Christiansen 23:34; Anthonisen 26:36	Report	Saviola 25:34

Sporthalle Dr. Fred Sinowatz-Schule, Wiener Neustadt
Referee: Vedran Babić (Croatia), Gordon Mccabe (Scotland)
29 August 2018
20:30

Murexin Allstars (Austria)	1–4	(Finland) Kampuksen Dynamo
J. Kytölä 14:14 (o.g.)	Report	Radin 3:47, 15:21; Korsunov 18:28; Valkama 30:05

Sporthalle Dr. Fred Sinowatz-Schule, Wiener Neustadt
Referee: Peter Nurse (England), Antonios Adamopoulos (Greece)

30 August 2018
18:00

Kampuksen Dynamo (Finland)	2–0	(Norway) Sandefjord
Radin 39:18; J. Kytölä 39:56	Report

Sporthalle Dr. Fred Sinowatz-Schule, Wiener Neustadt
Referee: Antonios Adamopoulos (Greece), Vedran Babić (Croatia)
30 August 2018
20:30

Murexin Allstars (Austria)	8–4	(Andorra) Encamp
Nicolin 1:15 (o.g.); V. Muharemovic 3:20, 29:46; Englisch 5:14; Jatic 21:03, 36:22 (2pen.); A. Muharemovic 25:35; Bezer 26:33	Report	Saviola 3:11; Barbosa 12:57; Andreu 30:11, 30:27

Sporthalle Dr. Fred Sinowatz-Schule, Wiener Neustadt
Referee: Gordon Mccabe (Scotland), Peter Nurse (England)

1 September 2018
18:00

Encamp (Andorra)	0–9	(Finland) Kampuksen Dynamo
	Report	J. Kytölä 3:06; Nicolin 5:56 (o.g.); M. Kytölä 8:54; Radin 9:09 (2pen.), 37:41 (2pen.); Korpela 14:52; Muridiyazd 31:29; Intala 33:55; Vidaković 35:01

Sporthalle Dr. Fred Sinowatz-Schule, Wiener Neustadt
Referee: Vedran Babić (Croatia), Antonios Adamopoulos (Greece)
1 September 2018
20:30

Sandefjord (Norway)	2–5	(Austria) Murexin Allstars
Espegren 2:38; Christiansen 19:46	Report	Nuhanovic 12:00, 14:01, 39:59; Saribekyan 16:40; V. Muharemovic 38:43

Sporthalle Dr. Fred Sinowatz-Schule, Wiener Neustadt
Referee: Peter Nurse (England), Gordon Mccabe (Scotland)

=== Group C ===
Pos	Team	Pld	W	D	L	GF	GA	GD	Pts	Qualification
1	(Sweden) Uddevalla (H)	3	3	0	0	14	7	+7	9	Main round
2	(Armenia) Leo	3	2	0	1	13	6	+7	6	
3	(Montenegro) Čelik	3	1	0	2	12	11	+1	3	
4	(Iceland) Vængir Júpiters	3	0	0	3	9	24	−15	0	

Source: UEFA
Rules for classification: Qualifying tiebreakers
(H) Hosts
29 August 2018
17:00

Leo (Armenia)	8–2	(Iceland) Vængir Júpiters
Galstyan 1:41, 7:56, 10:07, 36:32; Radovanović 3:18; Matheus 17:21; Mashumyan 19:24; Mkrtchyan 19:53	Report	K. Kristinsson 20:34; Guðjónsson 31:20

Agnebergshallen, Uddevalla
Referee: Kaloyan Kirilov (Bulgaria), Talgat Kosmukhambetov (Kazakhstan)
29 August 2018
19:30

Uddevalla (Sweden)	4–2	(Montenegro) Čelik
Al Mouti 13:25, 19:59, 39:14; G. Berisha 25:52	Report	Drašković 2:19; Spasojević 29:05

Agnebergshallen, Uddevalla
Referee: David Urdánoz Apezteguía (Spain), Jan Kresta (Czech Republic)

30 August 2018
17:00

Čelik (Montenegro)	2–4	(Armenia) Leo
Barović 7:54; Jakovljević 39:25	Report	Lucas 5:20; Mkrtchyan 6:13; Galstyan 35:56; Mardanyan 37:48

Agnebergshallen, Uddevalla
Referee: Jan Kresta (Czech Republic), Kaloyan Kirilov (Bulgaria)
30 August 2018
19:30

Uddevalla (Sweden)	8–4	(Iceland) Vængir Júpiters
Hiseni 2:17, 10:34, 15:20; Moussa 5:43; Bagger 25:06 (pen.); Söderqvist 29:07; Legiec 36:51, 39:21	Report	Eymundsson 19:38; Rögnvaldsson 24:09; Svavarsson 29:26; G. Kristinsson 35:21

Agnebergshallen, Uddevalla
Referee: Talgat Kosmukhambetov (Kazakhstan), David Urdánoz Apezteguía (Spain)

1 September 2018
14:00

Vængir Júpiters (Iceland)	3–8	(Montenegro) Čelik
Guðmundsson 15:55; Barović 19:48 (o.g.); þorsteinsson 20:34	Report	Drašković 10:16, 22:47; Barović 14:42; Jakovljević 19:30; Spasojević 32:51; Gojković 37:40; Durutović 38:27, 39:22

Agnebergshallen, Uddevalla
Referee: Jan Kresta (Czech Republic), Talgat Kosmukhambetov (Kazakhstan)
1 September 2018
16:30

Leo (Armenia)	1–2	(Sweden) Uddevalla
Galstyan 16:31	Report	Legiec 0:37, 4:32

Agnebergshallen, Uddevalla
Referee: David Urdánoz Apezteguía (Spain), Kaloyan Kirilov (Bulgaria)

=== Group D ===
Pos	Team	Pld	W	D	L	GF	GA	GD	Pts	Qualification
1	(Germany) Hohenstein-Ernstthal (H)	3	2	1	0	19	5	+14	7	Main round
2	(Greece) Doukas	3	1	2	0	11	9	+2	5	
3	(Albania) Tirana	3	1	1	1	8	9	−1	4	
4	(Northern Ireland) Belfast United	3	0	0	3	9	24	−15	0	

Source: UEFA
Rules for classification: Qualifying tiebreakers
(H) Hosts
30 August 2018
16:15

Doukas (Greece)	7–5	(Northern Ireland) Belfast United
Karmis 1:01; Karavidas 17:32; Irvine 19:44 (o.g.); Stavrakopoulos 21:33; Malovits 23:26; Kondylatos 28:59, 30:06	Report	Pierce 8:10; Lalor 14:37, 24:19; Colligan 35:24; Glenholmes 38:40

HOT-Sportzentrum, Hohenstein-Ernstthal
Referee: Igor Puzović (Bosnia and Herzegovina), Slawomir Steczko (Poland)
30 August 2018
19:00

Hohenstein-Ernstthal (Germany)	4–2	(Albania) Tirana
Wittig 22:08; Melnyk 28:39; Hudáček 38:42; Sharovara 39:12	Report	Alaj 4:00, 13:20

HOT-Sportzentrum, Hohenstein-Ernstthal
Referee: Ruben Guerreiro (Portugal), Omar Rafiq (Norway)

31 August 2018
16:15

Tirana (Albania)	1–1	(Greece) Doukas
Gashi 22:07	Report	Kondylatos 24:18

HOT-Sportzentrum, Hohenstein-Ernstthal
Referee: Omar Rafiq (Norway), Igor Puzović (Bosnia and Herzegovina)
31 August 2018
19:00

Hohenstein-Ernstthal (Germany)	12–0	(Northern Ireland) Belfast United
Elezi 0:59, 25:48; Shcherytsia 1:28; Wittig 18:58; Melnyk 21:28; Costa 22:12, 22:36, 36:43; Garcia 27:24; Belej 31:08, 35:48; Sharovara 39:15	Report

HOT-Sportzentrum, Hohenstein-Ernstthal
Referee: Slawomir Steczko (Poland), Ruben Guerreiro (Portugal)

2 September 2018
11:30

Belfast United (Northern Ireland)	4–5	(Albania) Tirana
Colligan 4:50, 32:34; Gunn 23:21; Magee 35:21	Report	Selmanaj 1:47, 16:18 (pen.); Alibegu 3:29; Kaca 14:56; Alaj 38:25

HOT-Sportzentrum, Hohenstein-Ernstthal
Referee: Igor Puzović (Bosnia and Herzegovina), Slawomir Steczko (Poland)
2 September 2018
14:15

Doukas (Greece)	3–3	(Germany) Hohenstein-Ernstthal
Hudáček 7:55 (o.g.); Konstantinou 31:40; Aggelinas 39:11	Report	Costa 3:51, 36:19; Hudáček 25:48

HOT-Sportzentrum, Hohenstein-Ernstthal
Referee: Ruben Guerreiro (Portugal), Omar Rafiq (Norway)

=== Group E ===
Pos	Team	Pld	W	D	L	GF	GA	GD	Pts	Qualification
1	(Malta) Valletta	3	3	0	0	17	7	+10	9	Main round
2	(North Macedonia) Veles (H)	3	2	0	1	19	11	+8	6	
3	(Estonia) Tallinna Cosmos	3	1	0	2	9	10	−1	3	
4	(Republic of Ireland) Futsamba Naas	3	0	0	3	5	22	−17	0	

Source: UEFA
Rules for classification: Qualifying tiebreakers
(H) Hosts
29 August 2018
17:30

Valletta (Malta)	4–2	(Estonia) Tallinna Cosmos
Kakabadze 2:22; Gomez 11:28; Yerai 32:36; Aleksić 38:20	Report	Tšernoussov 17:30; Grigorjev 20:07

Jane Sandanski Arena, Skopje
Referee: Dejan Veselič (Slovenia), Besar Beqiri (Kosovo)
29 August 2018
20:00

Veles (North Macedonia)	10–3	(Republic of Ireland) Futsamba Naas
Andov 2:34, 8:05, 38:56; Rangotov 8:53, 28:40; Gligorov 10:10; Petrovski 32:38; Todorovski 36:04, 39:34; Ramadan 39:23	Report	Stancuta 18:12, 25:50 (pen.), 36:30

Jane Sandanski Arena, Skopje
Referee: Fredric Nilholt (Sweden), Alem Bajrović (Bosnia and Herzegovina)

30 August 2018
17:30

Futsamba Naas (Republic of Ireland)	0–5	(Malta) Valletta
	Report	Kakabadze 2:00; Di Maio 7:16; Aleksić 8:26, 37:31; Gomez 26:19

Jane Sandanski Arena, Skopje
Referee: Alem Bajrović (Bosnia and Herzegovina), Dejan Veselič (Slovenia)
30 August 2018
20:00

Veles (North Macedonia)	4–0	(Estonia) Tallinna Cosmos
Rangotov 2:01, 13:59, 30:57; Gligorov 33:02	Report

Jane Sandanski Arena, Skopje
Referee: Besar Beqiri (Kosovo), Fredric Nilholt (Sweden)

1 September 2018
17:30

Tallinna Cosmos (Estonia)	7–2	(Republic of Ireland) Futsamba Naas
Grigorjev 7:47; Tšernoussov 23:32, 33:39, 38:37; Tšernei 26:25, 37:52; Sergejevs 39:08	Report	Galo 18:19; Bleahu 33:53

Jane Sandanski Arena, Skopje
Referee: Besar Beqiri (Kosovo), Alem Bajrović (Bosnia and Herzegovina)
1 September 2018
20:00

Valletta (Malta)	8–5	(North Macedonia) Veles
Gomez 15:07, 16:45, 38:21; Yerai 21:03, 39:51; Kakabadze 21:56; Di Maio 26:28; Bukia 39:14	Report	Stojkovski 8:27; Leveski 24:34, 35:05; Rangotov 26:57; Gligorov 38:24

Jane Sandanski Arena, Skopje
Referee: Fredric Nilholt (Sweden), Dejan Veselič (Slovenia)

=== Group F ===
Pos	Team	Pld	W	D	L	GF	GA	GD	Pts	Qualification
1	(Lithuania) Vytis (H)	3	3	0	0	20	4	+16	9	Main round
2	(Netherlands) Hovocubo	3	2	0	1	20	8	+12	6	
3	(England) Reading Escolla	3	1	0	2	10	18	−8	3	
4	(San Marino) Murata	3	0	0	3	4	24	−20	0	

Source: UEFA
Rules for classification: Qualifying tiebreakers
(H) Hosts
28 August 2018
15:30 (16:30 EEST)

Hovocubo (Netherlands)	12–2	(San Marino) Murata
Molkarai 2:46; Bouyouzan 7:36, 20:39; Makraou 9:14, 27:11; St Juste 12:36, 32:07; Mossaoui 15:41, 38:46; Suleiman 29:16; Amrani 32:50; Mellah 35:27	Report	Felici 6:22; Albani 39:55

Jonava Sports Arena, Jonava
Referee: Grigori Ošomkov (Estonia), Marco Rothenfluh (Switzerland)
28 August 2018
18:00 (19:00 EEST)

Vytis (Lithuania)	12–0	(England) Reading Escolla
Isaac 1:13, 22:20 (pen.); Genigle 11:35, 12:50; Sandrinho 14:37, 26:46; Rafa 15:05, 35:56; Andres 15:18, 34:53; Santos 24:54; Buinickij 34:02	Report

Jonava Sports Arena, Jonava
Referee: Hennadiy Hora (Ukraine), Ovidiu Dan Curta (Romania)

29 August 2018
15:30 (16:30 EEST)

Reading Escolla (England)	2–5	(Netherlands) Hovocubo
Muraca 30:42; Mieli 33:45	Report	Velseboer 5:42; Mellah 15:17, 23:47; Suleiman 23:23; Molkarai 27:07

Jonava Sports Arena, Jonava
Referee: Ovidiu Dan Curta (Romania), Grigori Ošomkov (Estonia)
29 August 2018
18:00 (19:00 EEST)

Vytis (Lithuania)	4–1	(San Marino) Murata
Santos 11:26, 14:26, 22:00; Rafa 16:34	Report	Busignani 38:14

Jonava Sports Arena, Jonava
Referee: Marco Rothenfluh (Switzerland), Hennadiy Hora (Ukraine)

31 August 2018
15:30 (16:30 EEST)

Murata (San Marino)	1–8	(England) Reading Escolla
Busignani 31:11	Report	Morales 7:53, 21:10; Lopez 12:05, 19:34, 33:40; Mieli 20:39; Nalletamby 37:19; Damasio 38:36

Jonava Sports Arena, Jonava
Referee: Ovidiu Dan Curta (Romania), Hennadiy Hora (Ukraine)
31 August 2018
18:00 (19:00 EEST)

Hovocubo (Netherlands)	3–4	(Lithuania) Vytis
Mellah 28:01; St Juste 36:33; Velseboer 38:56	Report	Zagurskas 33:13; Andres 35:32; Genigle 37:39, 39:09

Jonava Sports Arena, Jonava
Referee: Grigori Ošomkov (Estonia), Marco Rothenfluh (Switzerland)

=== Group G ===
Pos	Team	Pld	W	D	L	GF	GA	GD	Pts	Qualification
1	(Poland) Rekord Bielsko-Biała (H)	3	3	0	0	23	4	+19	9	Main round
2	(Bulgaria) Varna City	3	1	1	1	9	8	+1	4	
3	Racing Luxembourg	3	1	0	2	11	19	−8	3	
4	(Wales) Cardiff University	3	0	1	2	7	19	−12	1	

Source: UEFA
Rules for classification: Qualifying tiebreakers
(H) Hosts
30 August 2018
16:30

Varna City (Bulgaria)	5–3	Racing Luxembourg
Karageorgiev 5:06, 21:27 (pen.), 35:30; Petev 23:00; Stoykov 30:11	Report	Valente 5:32, 11:39 (pen.); Goncalves 8:43

Hala Pod Dębowcem, Bielsko-Biała
Referee: Aurélien Uzan (France), Šarūnas Tamulynas (Lithuania)
30 August 2018
19:00

Rekord Bielsko-Biała (Poland)	10–1	(Wales) Cardiff University
Marek 0:56, 11:47, 13:44; Bondar 6:19, 8:10, 16:08; Popławski 8:00; Kubik 11:07, 23:14; Viana 34:55	Report	Dorward 3:27

Hala Pod Dębowcem, Bielsko-Biała
Referee: Daniel Matkovic (Switzerland), Shota Kukhilava (Georgia)

31 August 2018
16:30

Cardiff University (Wales)	3–3	(Bulgaria) Varna City
Hudson 14:16; Dorward 32:09; Prangley 35:29	Report	Nestorov 6:45; Karageorgiev 23:31, 38:56

Hala Pod Dębowcem, Bielsko-Biała
Referee: Shota Kukhilava (Georgia), Aurélien Uzan (France)
31 August 2018
19:00

Rekord Bielsko-Biała (Poland)	11–2	Racing Luxembourg
Viana 3:42; Budniak 6:57, 18:10; Kubik 10:48; Marek 11:17, 16:40; Bondar 12:42, 37:14; Mura 28:11; Biel 35:12, 39:44 (2pen.)	Report	Goncalves 28:57; Rodrigues 35:45

Hala Pod Dębowcem, Bielsko-Biała
Referee: Šarūnas Tamulynas (Lithuania), Daniel Matkovic (Switzerland)

2 September 2018
15:30

Racing Luxembourg	6–3	(Wales) Cardiff University
Monteiro 10:07; Da Silva 19:44, 28:12; Soares 20:59, 21:11; Maia 23:26	Report	Prangley 12:37; Dabbs 29:34; Gomez 31:17

Hala Pod Dębowcem, Bielsko-Biała
Referee: Aurélien Uzan (France), Daniel Matkovic (Switzerland)
2 September 2018
18:00

Varna City (Bulgaria)	1–2	(Poland) Rekord Bielsko-Biała
Karageorgiev 18:21	Report	Kubik 11:55; Biel 28:33

Hala Pod Dębowcem, Bielsko-Biała
Referee: Shota Kukhilava (Georgia), Šarūnas Tamulynas (Lithuania)

=== Group H ===
Pos	Team	Pld	W	D	L	GF	GA	GD	Pts	Qualification
1	(Romania) Informatica Timişoara (H)	2	2	0	0	15	2	+13	6	Main round
2	(Gibraltar) Lynx	2	1	0	1	5	8	−3	3	
3	(Turkey) Osmanlıspor	2	0	0	2	4	14	−10	0	

Source: UEFA
Rules for classification: Qualifying tiebreakers
(H) Hosts
30 August 2018
18:00 (19:00 EEST)

Informatica Timişoara (Romania)	9–2	(Turkey) Osmanlıspor
Deco 0:48, 21:12; Valadares 5:40, 23:59, 29:32, 39:49; Bondar 9:22; Pedrinho 11:44; Ilas 26:29	Report	Aydogan 25:44; Deco 31:29 (o.g.)

Constantin Jude Hall, Timișoara
Referee: Dario Pezzuto (Italy), Lars Van Leeuwen (Netherlands)

31 August 2018
18:00 (19:00 EEST)

Osmanlıspor (Turkey)	2–5	(Gibraltar) Lynx
Ozkul 38:30; Pinar 39:16	Report	Martin 0:18; Popo 13:35, 35:50; Bernal 38:38, 39:52

Constantin Jude Hall, Timișoara
Referee: Lars Van Leeuwen (Netherlands), Ingo Heemsoth (Germany)

1 September 2018
18:00 (19:00 EEST)

Lynx (Gibraltar)	0–6	(Romania) Informatica Timişoara
	Report	Araujo 5:22, 6:25; Valadares 6:42, 25:33; Ruxandari 11:00, 36:49

Constantin Jude Hall, Timișoara
Referee: Ingo Heemsoth (Germany), Dario Pezzuto (Italy)

=== Group I ===
Pos	Team	Pld	W	D	L	GF	GA	GD	Pts	Qualification
1	(Georgia (country)) Tatishvili	2	1	1	0	8	6	+2	4	Main round
2	(Moldova) Dinamo Chişinău (H)	2	1	0	1	6	7	−1	3	
3	(Switzerland) RCD Fidell	2	0	1	1	9	10	−1	1	

Source: UEFA
Rules for classification: Qualifying tiebreakers
(H) Hosts
28 August 2018
15:00 (16:00 EEST)

Dinamo Chişinău (Moldova)	5–4	(Switzerland) RCD Fidell
Coceban 17:18; Negara 26:42; Munteanu 27:40; Deliatynskyi 35:07; Nicolaiciuc 38:12	Report	Sousa 6:39; Castelo 16:36, 35:54; Leonaldi 31:53

FMF Arena, Ciorescu
Referee: Raafat Al Hamola (Israel), Kirill Naishouler (Finland)

29 August 2018
15:00 (16:00 EEST)

RCD Fidell (Switzerland)	5–5	(Georgia (country)) Tatishvili
Leonaldi 13:41; Puente 24:57; Cia 32:34, 39:21; Sanchez 35:46	Report	Kekelia 3:17; Silagava 15:49; Ekizashvili 19:52; Jvarashvili 30:04; Tikurishvili 30:23

FMF Arena, Ciorescu
Referee: Daniele D'adamo (San Marino), Raafat Al Hamola (Israel)

30 August 2018
15:00 (16:00 EEST)

Tatishvili (Georgia (country))	3–1	(Moldova) Dinamo Chişinău
Tikurishvili 28:44, 30:31; Jvarashvili 38:45	Report	Negara 14:11

FMF Arena, Ciorescu
Referee: Kirill Naishouler (Finland), Raafat Al Hamola (Israel)

== Main round ==
Times are CEST (UTC+2), as listed by UEFA (local times, if different, are in parentheses).

=== Path A ===
The top three teams of each group in Path A advance to the elite round.

==== Group 1 ====
Pos	Team	Pld	W	D	L	GF	GA	GD	Pts	Qualification
1	(Portugal) Benfica	3	2	1	0	15	5	+10	7	Elite round
2	(Spain) Barcelona	3	2	1	0	12	6	+6	7	Elite round
3	(Belgium) Halle-Gooik (H)	3	1	0	2	15	16	−1	3	Elite round
4	(France) Kremlin-Bicêtre United	3	0	0	3	7	22	−15	0	

Source: UEFA
Rules for classification: Qualifying tiebreakers
(H) Hosts
3 October 2018
17:30

Barcelona (Spain)	4–2	(France) Kremlin-Bicêtre United
Ferrão 2:37, 3:14, 36:38; Esquerdinha 33:06	Report	Aigoun 17:18, 32:11

Sportcomplex De Bres, Halle
Referee: Balázs Farkas (Hungary), Christos Christou (Cyprus)
3 October 2018
20:00

Halle-Gooik (Belgium)	3–5	(Portugal) Benfica
Diogo 24:24; Patias 32:09; B. Coelho 35:53 (o.g.)	Report	Fits 5:22, 32:33; A. Coelho 21:14, 30:13; B. Coelho 25:59

Sportcomplex De Bres, Halle
Referee: Ondřej Černý (Czech Republic), Vladimir Kadykov (Russia)

4 October 2018
17:30

Benfica (Portugal)	1–1	(Spain) Barcelona
Cecílio 30:19	Report	Esquerdinha 35:16

Sportcomplex De Bres, Halle
Referee: Vladimir Kadykov (Russia), Balázs Farkas (Hungary)
4 October 2018
20:00

Halle-Gooik (Belgium)	9–4	(France) Kremlin-Bicêtre United
Diogo 1:25, 2:10; Carpes 7:18, 8:11, 35:22; Gréllo 20:19, 21:13; Leitão 33:48; Carsi 39:33	Report	Ba 13:00; Bessa 22:12; Saliou 29:18; Pezeron 31:07

Sportcomplex De Bres, Halle
Referee: Christos Christou (Cyprus), Ondřej Černý (Czech Republic)

6 October 2018
17:30

Kremlin-Bicêtre United (France)	1–9	(Portugal) Benfica
Saliou 9:48	Report	Tolrà 4:45; Robinho 15:51, 23:16, 32:14; Campos 25:03, 34:38; Henmi 26:12; Fits 32:51, 39:16

Sportcomplex De Bres, Halle
Referee: Christos Christou (Cyprus), Vladimir Kadykov (Russia)
6 October 2018
20:00

Barcelona (Spain)	7–3	(Belgium) Halle-Gooik
Esquerdinha 4:21, 5:00, 11:53; Ferrão 9:41, 32:12; Aicardo 29:11; Adolfo 35:36	Report	Diogo 19:55; Gréllo 22:17 (pen.); Patias 27:06

Sportcomplex De Bres, Halle
Referee: Ondřej Černý (Czech Republic), Balázs Farkas (Hungary)

==== Group 2 ====
Pos	Team	Pld	W	D	L	GF	GA	GD	Pts	Qualification
1	(Spain) Inter FS	3	3	0	0	9	3	+6	9	Elite round
2	(Czech Republic) Era-Pack Chrudim	3	2	0	1	8	5	+3	6	Elite round
3	(Serbia) Ekonomac (H)	3	1	0	2	8	12	−4	3	Elite round
4	(Ukraine) Prodexim Kherson	3	0	0	3	2	7	−5	0	

Source: UEFA
Rules for classification: Qualifying tiebreakers
(H) Hosts
3 October 2018
18:00

Inter FS (Spain)	3–0	(Ukraine) Prodexim Kherson
Humberto 2:14, 9:56; Arevalo 31:48	Report

Jezero Hall, Kragujevac
Referee: Josip Barton (Macedonia), Juan Boelen (Belgium)
3 October 2018
20:30

Ekonomac (Serbia)	3–6	(Czech Republic) Era-Pack Chrudim
Matijević 25:39; Thales 30:11; Igor 36:06	Report	Felipe 2:53, 18:17, 38:30; Everton 23:06; Drozd 28:39; Max 37:52

Jezero Hall, Kragujevac
Referee: Timo Onatsu (Finland), Vitali Rakutski (Belarus)

4 October 2018
18:00

Era-Pack Chrudim (Czech Republic)	1–2	(Spain) Inter FS
Bagatini 15:53 (2pen.)	Report	Humberto 11:22; Daniel 32:49

Jezero Hall, Kragujevac
Referee: Vitali Rakutski (Belarus), Josip Barton (Macedonia)
4 October 2018
20:30

Ekonomac (Serbia)	3–2	(Ukraine) Prodexim Kherson
Rajčević 1:33; Rnić 1:57; Matijević 28:29	Report	Roninho 24:48; Bilotserkivets 30:13

Jezero Hall, Kragujevac
Referee: Juan Boelen (Belgium), Timo Onatsu (Finland)

6 October 2018
18:00

Prodexim Kherson (Ukraine)	0–1	(Czech Republic) Era-Pack Chrudim
	Report	Slováček 38:41

Jezero Hall, Kragujevac
Referee: Timo Onatsu (Finland), Vitali Rakutski (Belarus)
6 October 2018
20:30

Inter FS (Spain)	4–2	(Serbia) Ekonomac
Ortiz 3:47; Borja 13:29; Humberto 21:24; Thales 27:16 (o.g.)	Report	Divanei 5:08; Rajčević 39:31

Jezero Hall, Kragujevac
Referee: Josip Barton (Macedonia), Juan Boelen (Belgium)

==== Group 3 ====
Pos	Team	Pld	W	D	L	GF	GA	GD	Pts	Qualification
1	(Russia) Gazprom-Ugra Yugorsk	3	3	0	0	15	2	+13	9	Elite round
2	(Slovenia) Dobovec (H)	3	2	0	1	9	4	+5	6	Elite round
3	(Russia) Sibiryak	3	1	0	2	4	13	−9	3	Elite round
4	(Hungary) Berettyóújfalu	3	0	0	3	4	13	−9	0	

Source: UEFA
Rules for classification: Qualifying tiebreakers
(H) Hosts
3 October 2018
17:30

Gazprom-Ugra Yugorsk (Russia)	4–1	(Hungary) Berettyóújfalu
Lyskov 9:05, 18:19; Marcênio 11:06; Kupatadze 23:25	Report	Amílcar 14:30

Podčetrtek Sports Hall, Podčetrtek
Referee: Marc Birkett (England), Trayan Enchev (Bulgaria)
3 October 2018
20:00

Dobovec (Slovenia)	3–0	(Russia) Sibiryak
Duščak 18:58; Čujec 36:20; Fetić 37:55	Report

Podčetrtek Sports Hall, Podčetrtek
Referee: Javier Moreno Reina (Spain), Vladan Radulović (Serbia)

4 October 2018
17:30

Sibiryak (Russia)	1–9	(Russia) Gazprom-Ugra Yugorsk
Joan 33:24 (pen.)	Report	Volyniuk 4:19; Lyskov 9:52; Shayakhmetov 23:56; Nando 26:46; Signev 30:35; Chishkala 31:49; Katata 34:51; Kupatadze 36:00, 36:44

Podčetrtek Sports Hall, Podčetrtek
Referee: Marc Birkett (England), Javier Moreno Reina (Spain)
4 October 2018
20:00

Dobovec (Slovenia)	6–2	(Hungary) Berettyóújfalu
Grbić 10:38; Fetić 21:35, 28:37; Čujec 27:28; Čeh 31:12; Mordej 39:33	Report	Gál 21:22, 30:33

Podčetrtek Sports Hall, Podčetrtek
Referee: Trayan Enchev (Bulgaria), Vladan Radulović (Serbia)

6 October 2018
17:30

Berettyóújfalu (Hungary)	1–3	(Russia) Sibiryak
Rábl 19:13	Report	Islamov 5:22; Bastrikov 9:37; Tchistopolov 27:38

Podčetrtek Sports Hall, Podčetrtek
Referee: Javier Moreno Reina (Spain), Marc Birkett (England)
6 October 2018
20:00

Gazprom-Ugra Yugorsk (Russia)	2–0	(Slovenia) Dobovec
Chishkala 30:55, 37:23	Report

Podčetrtek Sports Hall, Podčetrtek
Referee: Vladan Radulović (Serbia), Trayan Enchev (Bulgaria)

==== Group 4 ====
Pos	Team	Pld	W	D	L	GF	GA	GD	Pts	Qualification
1	(Kazakhstan) Kairat	3	3	0	0	15	4	+11	9	Elite round
2	(Portugal) Sporting CP	3	2	0	1	9	4	+5	6	Elite round
3	(Belarus) Lidselmash Lida	3	1	0	2	5	11	−6	3	Elite round
4	(Kosovo) Feniks (H)	3	0	0	3	5	15	−10	0	

Source: UEFA
Rules for classification: Qualifying tiebreakers
(H) Hosts
3 October 2018
18:00

Sporting CP (Portugal)	3–2	(Belarus) Lidselmash Lida
Leo 0:56; Cavinato 7:46; Dieguinho 9:13	Report	Zhigalko 30:28; Voronin 38:41

Palace of Youth and Sports, Pristina
Referee: Cédric Pelissier (France), Elchin Samadli (Azerbaijan)
3 October 2018
20:30

Feniks (Kosovo)	3–7	(Kazakhstan) Kairat
Cesar 8:46; Mejzini 19:32; Petrović 34:31	Report	Pereira 4:16; Taynan 10:44, 15:36, 23:57, 39:26; Jonhn Lennon 11:25; Edson 13:46

Palace of Youth and Sports, Pristina
Referee: Juan José Cordero Gallardo (Spain), Alessandro Malfer (Italy)

4 October 2018
18:00

Kairat (Kazakhstan)	2–1	(Portugal) Sporting CP
Taynan 4:49; Pereira 11:13	Report	Erick 14:00

Palace of Youth and Sports, Pristina
Referee: Alessandro Malfer (Italy), Cédric Pelissier (France)
4 October 2018
20:30

Feniks (Kosovo)	2–3	(Belarus) Lidselmash Lida
Topilla 11:42; Dentinho 39:06	Report	Zhigalko 21:42, 38:20; Podalinski 27:11

Palace of Youth and Sports, Pristina
Referee: Elchin Samadli (Azerbaijan), Juan José Cordero Gallardo (Spain)

6 October 2018
18:00

Lidselmash Lida (Belarus)	0–6	(Kazakhstan) Kairat
	Report	Taynan 2:17; Pereira 8:10; Edson 19:02, 33:48; Jonhn Lennon 20:29; Yesenamanov 34:52

Palace of Youth and Sports, Pristina
Referee: Elchin Samadli (Azerbaijan), Cédric Pelissier (France)
6 October 2018
20:30

Sporting CP (Portugal)	5–0	(Kosovo) Feniks
Cavinato 15:11, 24:41; Rocha 34:07; Deo 36:21; Erick 37:44	Report

Palace of Youth and Sports, Pristina
Referee: Juan José Cordero Gallardo (Spain), Alessandro Malfer (Italy)

=== Path B ===
The winners of each group in Path B advance to the elite round.

==== Group 5 ====
Pos	Team	Pld	W	D	L	GF	GA	GD	Pts	Qualification
1	(Italy) Acqua e Sapone	3	3	0	0	18	3	+15	9	Elite round
2	(Cyprus) APOEL (H)	3	1	0	2	7	11	−4	3 (Note: Head-to-head results: APOEL 4–0 Mostar SG Staklorad, APOEL 2–5 Uddevalla, Uddevalla 4–8 Mostar SG Staklorad. Head-to-head standings: APOEL: 3 pts, +1 GD (6 GF, 5 GA); Mostar SG Staklorad: 3 pts, 0 GD (8 GF, 8 GA); Uddevalla: 3 pts, −1 GD (9 GF, 10 GA))	
3	(Bosnia and Herzegovina) Mostar SG Staklorad	3	1	0	2	10	14	−4	3	
4	(Sweden) Uddevalla	3	1	0	2	9	16	−7	3	

Source: UEFA
Rules for classification: Qualifying tiebreakers
(H) Hosts
Notes:
3 October 2018
16:00 (17:00 EEST)

Acqua e Sapone (Italy)	6–0	(Sweden) Uddevalla
Calderolli 5:42, 11:38; Murilo 31:40; Lima 35:25; Pinto 37:59, 38:23	Report

Eleftheria Indoor Hall, Nicosia
Referee: Gábor Kovács (Hungary), Vasilios Christodoulis (Greece)
3 October 2018
18:30 (19:30 EEST)

APOEL (Cyprus)	4–0	(Bosnia and Herzegovina) Mostar SG Staklorad
Schlemper 22:16; Ferreira 29:58; Omirou 33:45; Iacovou 38:53	Report

Eleftheria Indoor Hall, Nicosia
Referee: Alejandro Martinez Flores (Spain), Dejan Veselič (Slovenia)

4 October 2018
15:00 (16:00 EEST)

Mostar SG Staklorad (Bosnia and Herzegovina)	2–6	(Italy) Acqua e Sapone
Dandan 24:45; Vesić 39:29	Report	Ercolessi 8:12, 28:59; Lima 20:36; Pinto 35:19; Coco 36:22; Calderolli 39:41

Eleftheria Indoor Hall, Nicosia
Referee: Vasilios Christodoulis (Greece), Alejandro Martinez Flores (Spain)
4 October 2018
18:00 (19:00 EEST)

APOEL (Cyprus)	2–5	(Sweden) Uddevalla
Omirou 8:40; Schlemper 37:21	Report	Zhubi 4:26; Legiec 8:53; M. Berisha 17:00; Smajlovic 26:33; G. Berisha 35:16

Eleftheria Indoor Hall, Nicosia
Referee: Dejan Veselič (Slovenia), Gábor Kovács (Hungary)

6 October 2018
15:00 (16:00 EEST)

Uddevalla (Sweden)	4–8	(Bosnia and Herzegovina) Mostar SG Staklorad
Hiseni 8:59; Legiec 13:25, 17:11; Kahvedžić 21:31 (o.g.)	Report	Kahvedžić 2:48, 26:10, 26:23, 38:51; Vesić 7:11; Hrkać 31:07; Dandan 37:51; Hiseni 39:50 (o.g.)

Eleftheria Indoor Hall, Nicosia
Referee: Vasilios Christodoulis (Greece), Dejan Veselič (Slovenia)
6 October 2018
18:00 (19:00 EEST)

Acqua e Sapone (Italy)	6–1	(Cyprus) APOEL
Ercolessi 2:51; Calderolli 12:08, 36:04; Murilo 19:06; Bertoni 34:47; Avellino 39:59	Report	Schlemper 26:48

Eleftheria Indoor Hall, Nicosia
Referee: Gábor Kovács (Hungary), Alejandro Martinez Flores (Spain)

==== Group 6 ====
Pos	Team	Pld	W	D	L	GF	GA	GD	Pts	Qualification
1	(Croatia) Novo Vrijeme (H)	3	3	0	0	14	6	+8	9	Elite round
2	(Kazakhstan) Aktobe	3	2	0	1	12	6	+6	6	
3	(Georgia (country)) Tatishvili	3	1	0	2	9	11	−2	3	
4	(Finland) Kampuksen Dynamo	3	0	0	3	2	14	−12	0	

Source: UEFA
Rules for classification: Qualifying tiebreakers
(H) Hosts
3 October 2018
18:00

Aktobe (Kazakhstan)	6–2	(Georgia (country)) Tatishvili
Da Silva 0:14; Siryi 2:16; Valenko 7:15, 32:40; Imanalin 10:27; Turegazin 34:24	Report	Kekelia 22:52; Kurdadze 36:30

Gradski Sportski Centar Makarska, Makarska
Referee: Tomasz Frąk (Poland), Jan Kliner (Czech Republic)
3 October 2018
20:30

Novo Vrijeme (Croatia)	6–1	(Finland) Kampuksen Dynamo
Kazazić 2:59; Babić 13:12, 25:40; Bašković 34:16; De Souza 34:34; Brito 37:36	Report	Intala 7:52

Gradski Sportski Centar Makarska, Makarska
Referee: Angelo Galante (Italy), Costas Nicolaou (Cyprus)

4 October 2018
18:00

Kampuksen Dynamo (Finland)	0–3	(Kazakhstan) Aktobe
	Report	Akbalikov 8:38, 28:37, 35:02

Gradski Sportski Centar Makarska, Makarska
Referee: Jan Kliner (Czech Republic), Angelo Galante (Italy)
4 October 2018
20:30

Novo Vrijeme (Croatia)	4–2	(Georgia (country)) Tatishvili
De Souza 9:00, 15:43; Kazazić 14:42; Bajrušović 27:38	Report	Kurdadze 4:31; Kekelia 18:51

Gradski Sportski Centar Makarska, Makarska
Referee: Costas Nicolaou (Cyprus), Tomasz Frąk (Poland)

6 October 2018
18:00

Tatishvili (Georgia (country))	5–1	(Finland) Kampuksen Dynamo
Ekizashvili 6:14, 26:23; Kekelia 25:29; Kurdadze 38:51; Jvarashvili 39:25	Report	M. Kytölä 16:47

Gradski Sportski Centar Makarska, Makarska
Referee: Jan Kliner (Czech Republic), Costas Nicolaou (Cyprus)
6 October 2018
20:30

Aktobe (Kazakhstan)	3–4	(Croatia) Novo Vrijeme
Imanalin 11:30 (2pen.); Siryi 29:24, 39:24	Report	Brito 11:22, 33:22; Osredkar 15:09; De Souza 38:12

Gradski Sportski Centar Makarska, Makarska
Referee: Angelo Galante (Italy), Tomasz Frąk (Poland)

==== Group 7 ====
Pos	Team	Pld	W	D	L	GF	GA	GD	Pts	Qualification
1	(Poland) Rekord Bielsko-Biała	3	2	1	0	13	2	+11	7	Elite round
2	(Romania) Informatica Timişoara	3	1	1	1	7	4	+3	4	
3	(Latvia) Nikars (H)	3	1	0	2	6	16	−10	3 (Note: Head-to-head result: Hohenstein-Ernstthal 3–4 Nikars.)	
4	(Germany) Hohenstein-Ernstthal	3	1	0	2	5	9	−4	3	

Source: UEFA
Rules for classification: Qualifying tiebreakers
(H) Hosts
Notes:
4 October 2018
16:00 (17:00 EEST)

Hohenstein-Ernstthal (Germany)	1–0	(Romania) Informatica Timişoara
Garcia 38:45	Report

Zemgale Olympic Center, Jelgava
Attendance: 125
Referee: Eduardo Fernandes Coelho (Portugal), Grigori Zelentsov (Russia)
4 October 2018
18:30 (19:30 EEST)

Nikars (Latvia)	0–7	(Poland) Rekord Bielsko-Biała
	Report	Marek 1:00, 1:25; Popławski 7:00, 18:40; Kubik 12:29, 29:35; Bondar 31:30

Zemgale Olympic Center, Jelgava
Attendance: 163
Referee: Borislav Kolev (Bulgaria), Moshe Bohbot (Israel)

5 October 2018
16:00 (17:00 EEST)

Rekord Bielsko-Biała (Poland)	5–1	(Germany) Hohenstein-Ernstthal
Budniak 0:10, 21:51; Popławski 27:42; Marek 36:02; Bondar 39:59	Report	Hudáček 7:23

Zemgale Olympic Center, Jelgava
Attendance: 78
Referee: Grigori Zelentsov (Russia), Borislav Kolev (Bulgaria)
5 October 2018
18:30 (19:30 EEST)

Nikars (Latvia)	2–6	(Romania) Informatica Timişoara
Seņs 36:14; Baklanovs 39:36	Report	Ovsyannikov 3:37, 36:47; Valadares 5:41; Pedrinho 25:36; Lupu 38:10; Araujo 39:21 (pen.)

Zemgale Olympic Center, Jelgava
Attendance: 148
Referee: Moshe Bohbot (Israel), Eduardo Fernandes Coelho (Portugal)

7 October 2018
14:00 (15:00 EEST)

Informatica Timişoara (Romania)	1–1	(Poland) Rekord Bielsko-Biała
Ovsyannikov 38:56	Report	Kubik 4:37

Zemgale Olympic Center, Jelgava
Attendance: 92
Referee: Eduardo Fernandes Coelho (Portugal), Grigori Zelentsov (Russia)
7 October 2018
16:30 (17:30 EEST)

Hohenstein-Ernstthal (Germany)	3–4	(Latvia) Nikars
Wittig 20:08; Belej 23:18; Melnyk 27:56	Report	Zabarovskis 5:18; Zolotuhins 20:55; Baklanovs 24:10; Seņs 30:53

Zemgale Olympic Center, Jelgava
Attendance: 125
Referee: Borislav Kolev (Bulgaria), Moshe Bohbot (Israel)

==== Group 8 ====
Pos	Team	Pld	W	D	L	GF	GA	GD	Pts	Qualification
1	(Lithuania) Vytis	3	3	0	0	9	2	+7	9	Elite round
2	(Slovakia) MIMEL Lučenec (H)	3	2	0	1	11	8	+3	6	
3	(Azerbaijan) Araz Naxçivan	3	0	1	2	3	7	−4	1	
4	(Malta) Valletta	3	0	1	2	4	10	−6	1	

Source: UEFA
Rules for classification: Qualifying tiebreakers
(H) Hosts
3 October 2018
15:30

Araz Naxçivan (Azerbaijan)	0–1	(Lithuania) Vytis
	Report	Rafa 25:37

Športová hala Aréna Lučenec, Lučenec
Referee: Ivan Shabanov (Russia), Swen Eichler (Germany)
3 October 2018
18:00

MIMEL Lučenec (Slovakia)	4–3	(Malta) Valletta
Fehevári 17:54, 32:56; Steinwandter 30:53; Kuhajdiík 34:20	Report	Elamari 15:44; Gomez 26:07; Musu 39:18

Športová hala Aréna Lučenec, Lučenec
Referee: Kamil Çetin (Turkey), David Schaerli (Switzerland)

4 October 2018
15:30

Valletta (Malta)	1–1	(Azerbaijan) Araz Naxçivan
Di Maio 28:43	Report	Baghirov 2:59

Športová hala Aréna Lučenec, Lučenec
Referee: Swen Eichler (Germany), Kamil Çetin (Turkey)
4 October 2018
18:00

MIMEL Lučenec (Slovakia)	2–3	(Lithuania) Vytis
Steinwandter 13:16 (2pen.); Fehevári 38:19 (pen.)	Report	Genigle 17:54; Isaac 18:30; Rafa 22:10

Športová hala Aréna Lučenec, Lučenec
Referee: David Schaerli (Switzerland), Ivan Shabanov (Russia)

6 October 2018
15:30

Vytis (Lithuania)	5–0	(Malta) Valletta
Genigle 0:18; Jeremejev 3:16; Buinickij 28:40 (pen.); Japa 36:45; Zagurskas 39:24	Report

Športová hala Aréna Lučenec, Lučenec
Referee: Ivan Shabanov (Russia), Kamil Çetin (Turkey)
6 October 2018
18:00

Araz Naxçivan (Azerbaijan)	2–5	(Slovakia) MIMEL Lučenec
Ismayilov 4:09; Chovdarov 5:02	Report	Greško 18:10, 29:46; Fehervári 19:10, 33:51, 35:26

Športová hala Aréna Lučenec, Lučenec
Referee: Swen Eichler (Germany), David Schaerli (Switzerland)

== Elite round ==
The draw for the elite round was held on 12 October 2018, 14:00 CEST (UTC+2), at the UEFA headquarters in Nyon, Switzerland. The 16 teams were drawn into four groups of four, containing one Path A group winners (seeding position 1), one Path A group runners-up (seeding position 2), and two teams which were either Path A group third-placed teams or Path B group winners (seeding positions 3 or 4). First, the four teams which were pre-selected as hosts (marked by (H) below) were drawn from their own designated pot and allocated to their respective group as per their seeding positions. Next, the remaining 12 teams were drawn from their respective pot which were allocated according to their seeding positions (teams, including hosts, which were neither Path A group winners nor runners-up were allocated to first seeding position 4, then seeding position 3). Winners and runners-up from the same Path A group could not be drawn in the same group, but third-placed teams could be drawn in the same group as winners or runners-up from the same Path A group. Teams from the same association could be drawn against each other.

Advanced from main round Path A
Group	Winners	Runners-up	Third-placed teams
Seed	Seeding position 1	Seeding position 2	Seeding position 3 or 4
1	(Portugal) Benfica	(Spain) Barcelona (H)	(Belgium) Halle-Gooik
2	(Spain) Inter FS	(Czech Republic) Era-Pack Chrudim (H)	(Serbia) Ekonomac
3	(Russia) Gazprom-Ugra Yugorsk	(Slovenia) Dobovec	(Russia) Sibiryak
4	(Kazakhstan) Kairat	(Portugal) Sporting CP (H)	(Belarus) Lidselmash Lida

Advanced from main round Path B
Group	Winners
Seed	Seeding position 3 or 4
5	(Italy) Acqua e Sapone
6	(Croatia) Novo Vrijeme
7	(Poland) Rekord Bielsko-Biała
8	(Lithuania) Vytis (H)

The winners of each group advance to the final tournament.

Times are CET (UTC+1), as listed by UEFA (local times, if different, are in parentheses).

=== Group A ===
Pos	Team	Pld	W	D	L	GF	GA	GD	Pts	Qualification
1	(Spain) Inter FS	3	3	0	0	13	6	+7	9	Final tournament
2	(Slovenia) Dobovec	3	2	0	1	8	10	−2	6	
3	(Belgium) Halle-Gooik	3	1	0	2	12	11	+1	3	
4	(Lithuania) Vytis (H)	3	0	0	3	5	11	−6	0	

Source: UEFA
Rules for classification: Qualifying tiebreakers
(H) Hosts
14 November 2018
16:00 (17:00 EET)

Inter FS (Spain)	5–1	(Slovenia) Dobovec
Humberto 10:37; Gadeia 15:49 (2pen.); Daniel 18:19; Pola 33:12; Elisandro 39:12	Report	Duščak 36:47

Alytus Arena, Alytus
Referee: Saša Tomić (Croatia), Nikola Jelić (Croatia)
14 November 2018
19:00 (20:00 EET)

Vytis (Lithuania)	2–5	(Belgium) Halle-Gooik
Rafa 24:39; Barbosa 38:22	Report	Diogo 10:45, 12:53; Leitão 14:15; Fernandão 27:35; Patias 39:15

Alytus Arena, Alytus
Referee: Marc Birkett (England), Kamil Çetin (Turkey)

15 November 2018
16:00 (17:00 EET)

Halle-Gooik (Belgium)	3–4	(Spain) Inter FS
Patias 26:35, 29:14; Leo 39:17	Report	Gadeia 2:54, 38:00; Pola 12:28; Ricardinho 22:26

Alytus Arena, Alytus
Referee: Kamil Çetin (Turkey), Marc Birkett (England)
15 November 2018
19:00 (20:00 EET)

Vytis (Lithuania)	1–2	(Slovenia) Dobovec
Sandrinho 39:21	Report	Fetić 2:17; Mordej 21:53

Alytus Arena, Alytus
Referee: Nikola Jelić (Croatia), Saša Tomić (Croatia)

17 November 2018
16:00 (17:00 EET)

Dobovec (Slovenia)	5–4	(Belgium) Halle-Gooik
Mordej 2:28, 2:57; Grbić 19:46; Totošković 30:09; Čeh 34:57	Report	Carsi 2:14, 17:08; Diogo 28:33; Patias 38:02

Alytus Arena, Alytus
Referee: Marc Birkett (England), Kamil Çetin (Turkey)
17 November 2018
19:00 (20:00 EET)

Inter FS (Spain)	4–2	(Lithuania) Vytis
Humberto 12:57, 14:52; Elisandro 26:35; Bebe 39:08	Report	Sandrinho 1:21; Sendžikas 14:33

Alytus Arena, Alytus
Referee: Saša Tomić (Croatia), Nikola Jelić (Croatia)

=== Group B ===
Pos	Team	Pld	W	D	L	GF	GA	GD	Pts	Qualification
1	(Spain) Barcelona (H)	3	3	0	0	11	2	+9	9	Final tournament
2	(Russia) Gazprom-Ugra Yugorsk	3	2	0	1	7	7	0	6	
3	(Serbia) Ekonomac	3	1	0	2	11	13	−2	3	
4	(Poland) Rekord Bielsko-Biała	3	0	0	3	8	15	−7	0	

Source: UEFA
Rules for classification: Qualifying tiebreakers
(H) Hosts
15 November 2018
18:30

Gazprom-Ugra Yugorsk (Russia)	4–3	(Poland) Rekord Bielsko-Biała
Lyskov 4:07, 7:51; Shayakhmetov 21:29; Chishkala 33:17	Report	Kubik 9:33, 36:00, 39:47

Palau Blaugrana, Barcelona
Referee: Angelo Galante (Italy), Alessandro Malfer (Italy)
15 November 2018
21:15

Barcelona (Spain)	6–1	(Serbia) Ekonomac
Adolfo 5:01, 17:39; Ferrão 7:21; Dyego 13:03; Aicardo 21:50; Lozano 34:58	Report	Divanei 9:06

Palau Blaugrana, Barcelona
Referee: Eduardo Fernandes Coelho (Portugal), Miguel Castilho (Portugal)

16 November 2018
18:30

Ekonomac (Serbia)	2–3	(Russia) Gazprom-Ugra Yugorsk
Matijević 8:46; Rajčević 25:14	Report	Nando 17:29; Shayakhmetov 30:01; Kupatadze 39:14

Palau Blaugrana, Barcelona
Referee: Miguel Castilho (Portugal), Eduardo Fernandes Coelho (Portugal)
16 November 2018
21:15

Barcelona (Spain)	3–1	(Poland) Rekord Bielsko-Biała
Esquerdinha 16:57; Ferrão 27:13; Adolfo 38:56	Report	Viana 16:15

Palau Blaugrana, Barcelona
Referee: Alessandro Malfer (Italy), Angelo Galante (Italy)

18 November 2018
11:00

Rekord Bielsko-Biała (Poland)	4–8	(Serbia) Ekonomac
Bondar 4:49, 33:53; Surmiak 29:49; Marek 32:52	Report	Thales 6:10, 28:11; Divanei 7:12, 11:35, 16:06; Igor 20:59, 26:31; Rajčević 33:20

Palau Blaugrana, Barcelona
Referee: Eduardo Fernandes Coelho (Portugal), Miguel Castilho (Portugal)
18 November 2018
13:15

Gazprom-Ugra Yugorsk (Russia)	0–2	(Spain) Barcelona
	Report	Ferrão 7:24 (pen.); Juanjo 39:50

Palau Blaugrana, Barcelona
Referee: Alessandro Malfer (Italy), Angelo Galante (Italy)

=== Group C ===
Pos	Team	Pld	W	D	L	GF	GA	GD	Pts	Qualification
1	(Portugal) Sporting CP (H)	3	2	1	0	11	1	+10	7	Final tournament
2	(Portugal) Benfica	3	2	1	0	10	3	+7	7	
3	(Russia) Sibiryak	3	1	0	2	5	9	−4	3	
4	(Croatia) Novo Vrijeme	3	0	0	3	1	14	−13	0	

Source: UEFA
Rules for classification: Qualifying tiebreakers
(H) Hosts
15 November 2018
15:00 (14:00 WET)

Benfica (Portugal)	5–0	(Croatia) Novo Vrijeme
Cecílio 7:01; Campos 9:07, 18:44, 28:57; Robinho 22:51	Report

Pavilhão João Rocha, Lisbon
Referee: Juan José Cordero Gallardo (Spain), Alejandro Martinez Flores (Spain)
15 November 2018
21:30 (20:30 WET)

Sporting CP (Portugal)	4–0	(Russia) Sibiryak
Cardinal 6:41; Deo 15:03; Dieguinho 20:52, 29:00	Report

Pavilhão João Rocha, Lisbon
Referee: Ondřej Černý (Czech Republic), Cédric Pelissier (France)

16 November 2018
15:00 (14:00 WET)

Sibiryak (Russia)	2–4	(Portugal) Benfica
Balashov 22:40; Pokotylo 37:48	Report	B. Coelho 7:47, 24'00; Robinho 11:24; Chaguinha 28:41

Pavilhão João Rocha, Lisbon
Referee: Alejandro Martinez Flores (Spain), Juan José Cordero Gallardo (Spain)
16 November 2018
21:30 (20:30 WET)

Sporting CP (Portugal)	6–0	(Croatia) Novo Vrijeme
P. Cary 1:23; Dieguinho 4:01, 30:39; Rocha 11:07; Alex 15:39; Erick 27:26	Report

Pavilhão João Rocha, Lisbon
Referee: Cédric Pelissier (France), Ondřej Černý (Czech Republic)

18 November 2018
17:00 (16:00 WET)

Novo Vrijeme (Croatia)	1–3	(Russia) Sibiryak
Osredkar 22:10	Report	Islamov 31:40; Joan 38:06 (2pen.); Bastrikov 39:32

Pavilhão João Rocha, Lisbon
Referee: Ondřej Černý (Czech Republic), Cédric Pelissier (France)
18 November 2018
20:00 (19:00 WET)

Benfica (Portugal)	1–1	(Portugal) Sporting CP
Robinho 11:28	Report	Cardinal 17:16 (2pen.)

Pavilhão João Rocha, Lisbon
Referee: Juan José Cordero Gallardo (Spain), Alejandro Martinez Flores (Spain)

=== Group D ===
Pos	Team	Pld	W	D	L	GF	GA	GD	Pts	Qualification
1	(Kazakhstan) Kairat	3	3	0	0	15	5	+10	9	Final tournament
2	(Italy) Acqua e Sapone	3	2	0	1	15	7	+8	6	
3	(Czech Republic) Era-Pack Chrudim (H)	3	1	0	2	6	7	−1	3	
4	(Belarus) Lidselmash Lida	3	0	0	3	5	22	−17	0	

Source: UEFA
Rules for classification: Qualifying tiebreakers
(H) Hosts
14 November 2018
17:30

Kairat (Kazakhstan)	4–1	(Italy) Acqua e Sapone
Tayyebi 18:24; Orazov 29:05, 38:14; Higuita 36:26	Report	Bertoni 0:08

Zimní stadion, Chrudim
Referee: Gábor Kovács (Hungary), Balázs Farkas (Hungary)
14 November 2018
20:00

Era-Pack Chrudim (Czech Republic)	4–0	(Belarus) Lidselmash Lida
Bagatini 22:20; Slováček 28:50, 35:23; Felipe 38:15	Report

Zimní stadion, Chrudim
Referee: Ivan Shabanov (Russia), Vladimir Kadykov (Russia)

15 November 2018
17:30

Lidselmash Lida (Belarus)	2–7	(Kazakhstan) Kairat
Voronin 10:15; Zhigalko 22:09	Report	Edson 2:45, 3:53, 21:04, 31:21; Tayyebi 7:41 (pen.); Pereira 35:50; Tursagulov 36:40

Zimní stadion, Chrudim
Referee: Balázs Farkas (Hungary), Gábor Kovács (Hungary)
15 November 2018
20:00

Era-Pack Chrudim (Czech Republic)	0–3	(Italy) Acqua e Sapone
	Report	Murilo 0:24; Bertoni 17:44; Slováček 25:07 (o.g.)

Zimní stadion, Chrudim
Referee: Vladimir Kadykov (Russia), Ivan Shabanov (Russia)

17 November 2018
16:30

Acqua e Sapone (Italy)	11–3	(Belarus) Lidselmash Lida
Bertoni 2:40; Lima 3:54, 9:47, 37:19; De Oliveira 19:29, 36:02; Calderolli 20:33; Lukaian 24:28, 30:24; Avellino 35:22, 37:47	Report	Todua 10:22; Calderolli 21:57 (o.g.); Kandratovich 28:31

Zimní stadion, Chrudim
Referee: Gábor Kovács (Hungary), Balázs Farkas (Hungary)
17 November 2018
19:00

Kairat (Kazakhstan)	4–2	(Czech Republic) Era-Pack Chrudim
Pereira 1:45; Jonhn Lennon 6:08; Yesenamanov 16:34; Tursagulov 28:17	Report	Slováček 21:45; Max 24:47

Zimní stadion, Chrudim
Referee: Vladimir Kadykov (Russia), Ivan Shabanov (Russia)

== Final tournament ==
The hosts of the final tournament were selected from the four qualified teams. Kairat were chosen as hosts at the UEFA Executive Committee meeting in Dublin, Republic of Ireland on 3 December 2018, with the final tournament taking place at the Almaty Arena in Almaty, Kazakhstan, on 26 and 28 April 2019.

=== Qualified teams ===
In the following table, all final tournaments were in the Futsal Cup era. Only final tournaments in four-team format starting from 2007 are shown.

Group	Winners	Previous final tournament appearances (bold indicates winners)
A	(Spain) Inter FS	6 (2007, **2009**, 2010, 2016, **2017**, **2018**)
B	(Spain) Barcelona	5 (**2012**, 2013, **2014**, 2015, 2018)
C	(Portugal) Sporting CP	5 (2011, 2012, 2015, 2017, 2018)
D	(Kazakhstan) Kairat (hosts)	7 (2008, 2009, 2011, **2013**, 2014, **2015**, 2017)

Notes

1. Inter FS were also champions in 2004 and 2006, when the finals were played in two-legged home-and-away format.

=== Final draw ===
The draw for the final tournament was held on 1 February 2019, at half-time of the Kazakhstan v Croatia friendly (kick-off 19:30 local time), at the Baluan Sholak Sports Palace in Almaty. The four teams were drawn into two semi-finals without any restrictions.

=== Bracket ===
In the semi-finals and final, extra time and penalty shoot-out were used to decide the winner if necessary; however, no extra time was used in the third place match (Regulations Article 17.01 and 17.02).

Semi-finals
26 April – Almaty
**(Portugal) Sporting CP**	**5**
(Spain) Inter FS	3
26 April – Almaty
(Spain) Barcelona	2
**(Kazakhstan) Kairat**	**5**

Final
28 April – Almaty
**(Portugal) Sporting CP**	**2**
(Kazakhstan) Kairat	1
Third place match
28 April – Almaty
(Spain) Inter FS	1
**(Spain) Barcelona**	**3**

Times are CEST (UTC+2), as listed by UEFA (local times are in parentheses).

=== Semi-finals ===
26 April 2019
14:45 (18:45 ALMT)

Sporting CP (Portugal)	5–3	(Spain) Inter FS
Deo 5:25; Dieguinho 23:41, 29:34, 35:57; Cardinal 39:38	Report	Pedro Cary 5:16 (o.g.); Bebe 37:00; Gadeia 39:41

Almaty Arena, Almaty
Attendance: 6,700
Referee: Marc Birkett (England), Kamil Çetin (Turkey)

26 April 2019
17:30 (21:30 ALMT)

Barcelona (Spain)	2–5	(Kazakhstan) Kairat
Lozano 38:27; Dyego 39:16	Report	Tayyebi 21:21; Taynan 27:00; Jonhn Lennon 37:37; Edson 39:04; Douglas Júnior 39:52

Almaty Arena, Almaty
Attendance: 12,090
Referee: Alessandro Malfer (Italy), Angelo Galante (Italy)

=== Third place match ===
28 April 2019
13:30 (17:30 ALMT)

Inter FS (Spain)	1–3	(Spain) Barcelona
Marlon 6:27	Report	Ferrão 9:00; Adolfo 11:39; Esquerdinha 34:50

Almaty Arena, Almaty
Attendance: 7,031
Referee: Alessandro Malfer (Italy), Angelo Galante (Italy)

=== Final ===
28 April 2019
16:00 (20:00 ALMT)

Sporting CP (Portugal)	2–1	(Kazakhstan) Kairat
Cavinato 21:17; Merlim 26:49	Report	Douglas Júnior 37:39

Almaty Arena, Almaty
Attendance: 11,973
Referee: Saša Tomić (Croatia), Nikola Jelić (Croatia)

== Top goalscorers ==
- Preliminary round: There were 382 goals scored in 48 matches, for an average of 7.96 goals per match.
- Main round: There were 281 goals scored in 48 matches, for an average of 5.85 goals per match.
- Elite round: There were 143 goals scored in 24 matches, for an average of 5.96 goals per match.
- Final tournament: There were 22 goals scored in 4 matches, for an average of 5.5 goals per match.

— Team eliminated / inactive for this stage.

Rank	Player	Team	PR	MR	ER	FT	Total
1	(Poland) Michał Kubik	(Poland) Rekord Bielsko-Biała	4	3	3	—	10
2	(Brazil) Ferrão	(Spain) Barcelona	—	5	3	1	9
2	(Ukraine) Oleksandr Bondar	(Poland) Rekord Bielsko-Biała	5	2	2	—	9
2	(Poland) Michał Marek	(Poland) Rekord Bielsko-Biała	5	3	1	—	9
5	(Brazil) Dieguinho	(Portugal) Sporting CP	—	1	4	3	8
5	(Brazil) Edson	(Kazakhstan) Kairat	—	3	4	1	8
5	(Bosnia and Herzegovina) Nermin Kahvedžić	(Bosnia and Herzegovina) Mostar SG Staklorad	4	4	—	—	8
8	(Russia) Leandro Esquerdinha	(Spain) Barcelona	—	5	1	1	7
8	(Kazakhstan) Taynan da Silva	(Kazakhstan) Kairat	—	6	0	1	7
8	(Brazil) Diogo Castro	(Belgium) Halle-Gooik	—	4	3	—	7
8	(Brazil) Humberto	(Spain) Inter FS	—	4	3	0	7
8	(Sweden) Kristian Legiec	(Sweden) Uddevalla	4	3	—	—	7
8	(Romania) Sávio Valadares	(Romania) Informatica Timişoara	6	1	—	—	7

Source: UEFA.com
