= Diego Cavinato =

Brazilian-born Italian futsal player

Personal information
- Full name: Diego Simoni Cavinato
- Date of birth: 6 May 1985 (age 41)
- Place of birth: São Lourenço do Oeste, Brazil
- Height: 1.78 m (5 ft 10 in)
- Position: Winger

Team information
- Current team: Sporting CP
- Number: 17

Senior career*
Years	Team	Apps	(Gls)
2006–2010	Augusta		
2010–2014	Asti		
2014–2015	Acqua e Sapone		
2015–2023	Sporting CP	229	(246)

International career^{‡}
2010–	Italy	23	(15)
- * Club domestic league appearances and goals as of 00:00, 11 November 2023 (UTC) ‡ National team caps and goals as of 00:00, 1 April 2019 (UTC)

Diego Simoni Cavinato (born 6 May 1985) is a Brazilian-born Italian futsal player who plays for the Italian national futsal team.

== Honours ==
- Liga Portuguesa: 2015–16, 2016–17, 2017–18, 2020–21, 2021–22, 2022–23
- Taça de Portugal: 2015–16, 2017–18, 2018–19, 2019–20, 2021–22
- Taça da Liga de Futsal: 2015–16, 2017–18, 2020–21, 2021–22
- Supertaça de Futsal: 2017, 2018, 2021, 2022
- UEFA Futsal Champions League: 2018–19, 2020–21
