= Gadeia =

Brazilian futsal player

Personal information
- Full name: Fabrício Bastezini
- Date of birth: 14 June 1988 (age 38)
- Place of birth: São Lourenço do Oeste, Brazil
- Height: 1.76 m (5 ft 9 in)
- Position: Winger

Team information
- Current team: ElPozo Murcia FS
- Number: 31

Senior career*
Years	Team	Apps	(Gls)
2009–2012	Copagril		
2012–2013	Inter FS		
2013–2016	Intelli		
2017–2021	Inter FS		
2021-	ElPozo Murcia		

International career^{‡}
2009-	Brazil		
- * Club domestic league appearances and goals as of 00:00, 27 October 2018 (UTC) ‡ National team caps and goals as of 00:00, 27 October 2018 (UTC)

Fabrício Bastezini (born 14 June 1988), known as Gadeia, is a Brazilian futsal player who plays as a winger for ElPozo Murcia FS and the Brazilian national futsal team.

== Honours ==
- UEFA Futsal Champions League fourth place: 2018–19
