= André Galvão (futsal player) =

Portuguese futsal player

Personal information
- Full name: André Filipe Santos Galvão
- Date of birth: 27 July 1992 (age 34)
- Place of birth: Portugal
- Height: 1.85 m (6 ft 1 in)
- Position: Pivot

Team information
- Current team: Viseu 2001
- Number: 27

Youth career
- 2003–2009: Juventude Horta Nova
- 2009–2011: Sporting CP

Senior career*
Years	Team	Apps	(Gls)
2011–2015	Sporting CP	92	(19)
2014–2015	→ AD Fundão (loan)		
2015–2017	FC Benago	38	(49)
2017–	Viseu 2001	41	(28)

International career^{‡}
2012	Portugal U21	7	(5)
2012–	Portugal	4	(1)
- * Club domestic league appearances and goals as of 00:00, 8 October 2018 (UTC) ‡ National team caps and goals as of 00:00, 21 August 2019 (UTC)

André Filipe Santos Galvão (born 27 July 1992) is a Portuguese futsal player who is a pivot for Viseu 2001 and the Portugal national team.
