= Tiaguinho (futsal player) =

Portuguese futsal player (born 1998)

Personal information
- Full name: Tiago André Santos Fernandes
- Date of birth: 17 June 1998 (age 28)
- Place of birth: Portugal
- Height: 1.69 m (5 ft 7 in)
- Position: Winger

Team information
- Current team: Quinta dos Lombos
- Number: 19

Youth career
- 2006–2014: Cohaemato
- 2014–2016: Benfica

Senior career*
Years	Team	Apps	(Gls)
2015–2017	Benfica	22	(2)
2017–2019	→ Braga/AAUM (loan)	49	(11)
2019–2020	→ Modicus Sandim (loan)	18	(4)
2020–	→ Quinta dos Lombos (loan)	15	(1)

International career^{‡}
2015–2017	Portugal U19	8	(1)
2017–2018	Portugal U21	14	(3)
2018–	Portugal	4	(0)
- * Club domestic league appearances and goals as of 00:00, 26 February 2021 (UTC) ‡ National team caps and goals as of 00:00, 11 May 2019 (UTC)

Tiago André Santos Fernandes (born 17 June 1998), also known as Tiaguinho, is a Portuguese futsal player who plays as a winger for the Portugal national team and for Quinta dos Lombos on loan from Benfica. Tiaguinho has previously played for Braga/AAUM and Modicus Sandim, both also on loan from Benfica.
