= Vinícius Rocha =

Brazilian futsal player

Personal information
- Full name: Vinícius Nunes Rocha
- Date of birth: 30 March 1995 (age 31)
- Place of birth: São Vicente, Brazil
- Height: 1.77 m (5 ft 9 1/2 in)
- Position: Pivot

Team information
- Current team: Sporting CP
- Number: 70

Youth career
- –2015: Corinthians

Senior career*
Years	Team	Apps	(Gls)
2016	Corinthians	24	(8)
2017–2018	Magnus Futsal	28	(15)
2018–2021	Sporting CP	72	(49)
2021	Carlos Barbosa	5	(1)
2021–2024	S.L. Benfica		
2024–2025	L84 Torino		
2025–	Sporting CP		

International career
2017–	Brazil		
- * Club domestic league appearances and goals as of 7 August 2018 (UTC)

Vinícius Nunes Rocha more commonly known as Rocha (born 30 March 1995) is a Brazilian futsal player who plays for Sporting CP and the Brazilian national futsal team as a pivot.

== Honours ==
- UEFA Futsal Champions League (3): 2018–19, 2020–21, 2025–26
- Portuguese Futsal Championship: 2020-21
- Portuguese Futsal Cup (2): 2018-19, 2019-20
- Portuguese Futsal League Cup: 2020-21
- Portuguese Futsal Supercup (2): 2018, 2019
