= Viseu 2001 =

- Full name: Viseu 2001 Associação Desportiva Social e Cultural
- Ground: Pavilhão Desportivo Cidade de Viseu; Viseu, Portugal
- Capacity: 1200
- Chairman: Pedro Miguel Almeida
- Manager: Paulo Fernandes
- League: Liga Sport Zone
- 2017–18: II Divisão Futsal; Series C: 1st North Zone: 1st Playoffs: Winner
- Website: http://viseu2001.com/

Viseu 2001 Associação Desportiva Social e Cultural is a sports club based in the city of Viseu, Portugal. The futsal team of Viseu 2001 plays in the Portuguese Futsal First Division.

== Futsal ==
=== Current squad ===
As of 15 May 2019

#	Position	Name	Nationality
1	Goalkeeper	Fernando Matos	(Portugal)
2	Goalkeeper	Nilton Fontes	(São Tomé and Príncipe)
4	Defender	Bernardo Costa	(Portugal)
7	Pivot	Lucas Amparo	(Brazil)
8	Winger	Ismael Furtado	(Portugal)
9	Winger	Eduardo Santos	(Switzerland)
10	Universal	Nuças	(Portugal)
11	Winger	Gonçalo Almeida	(Portugal)
12	Goalkeeper	Pedro Ferraz	(Portugal)
13	Defender	Alexandre Lopes	(Portugal)
15	Winger	Pedro Peixoto	(Portugal)
17	Defender	Bartolomeu Borges	(Portugal)
20	Defender	Vitinho	(Brazil)
20	Defender	Daniel Coelho	(Portugal)
23	Winger	Gabriel Buckson	(Switzerland)
27	Pivot	André Galvão	(Portugal)
80	Defender	Tiaguinho	(Portugal)
82	Winger	Kilson Santos	(Brazil)
	Winger	André Gomes	(Portugal)
