= Racing Futsal Luxembourg =

- Full name: Racing Football Club Union Lëtzebuerg
- Founded: 2016 (Futsal), 2005 (Club)
- Ground: Hall Omnisports Josy Barthel, Luxembourg City
- Capacity: 250
- Chairman: (Luxembourg) Karine Reuter
- Manager: (Portugal) André Sério
- League: Luxembourg Futsal Ligue 1
- 2018-2019: Ligue 1, 1st
- Website: http://www.racing-union.lu/
Home colours	Away colours

Racing Futsal Luxembourg is a futsal club based in Luxembourg City, Luxembourg.

The club was founded in 2016 and joined the Federation Luxembourgeoise de Football (FLF). On 5 March 2017 the club became the champion of the first official competition in Futsal Ligue 2 and was promoted to Futsal Ligue 1. In the 2017/18 debut season the club won the championship and the national cup. Racing Futsal won the national championship again this year and will participate in the second edition of the UEFA Futsal Champions League.

== Honours ==
=== Domestic ===
- Luxembourg Futsal Ligue 1 Champions (2)
  - 2017–18, 2018–19
- Luxembourg Futsal Cup Winners (1)
  - 2016–17
- Luxembourg Futsal Ligue 2 Champions (1)
  - 2016–17

=== International ===
- UEFA Futsal Champions League Participations (2)
  - 2018–19, 2019–20

== Current squad ==
=== Technical Staff ===
- (Luxembourg) Tiago Fernandes (Directeur Sportif)
- (Portugal) José Valente
- (Luxembourg) Carmen Sousa
- (Luxembourg) Steve Martins
- (Portugal) Ana Maria Valente
- (Luxembourg) Jorge Fernandes
- (Luxembourg) Cristiano Alves

=== Coaching staff ===
- (Portugal) André Sério (Head Coach)
- (Portugal) Miguel Monteiro (Deputy Coach)
- (Italy) Julien Mantovanelli (Deputy Coach)

=== Players ===
As of 12 March 2019

#	Position	Name	Nationality
1	Goalkeeper	Moises Valente	(Luxembourg)
3	Goalkeeper	Michel Vaz	(Luxembourg)
4	Winger	Rafael Dos Reis	(Luxembourg)
5	Defender	Micka Pereira	(Luxembourg)
6	Defender	Steve Guedes	(Luxembourg)
7	Winger	Admir Agovic	(Luxembourg)
8	Pivot	Tiago Da Silva	(Luxembourg)
9	Pivot	Rafael Valente	(Luxembourg)
10	Winger	Carlos Soares	(Portugal)
14	Defender	Filipe Maia	(Portugal)
23	Winger	Joe Monteiro	(Luxembourg)
27	Winger	João Guerrinha	(Portugal)
69	Goalkeeper	André Silva	(Portugal)
88	Defender	Dani Figueiredo	(Luxembourg)
