= Erick Mendonça =

Mexican-born Portuguese futsal player

Personal information
- Full name: Erick Olim Mendonça
- Date of birth: 21 July 1995 (age 31)
- Place of birth: Guadalajara, Mexico
- Position: Universal

Team information
- Current team: Barça
- Number: 17

Youth career
- 2007–2012: Quinta dos Lombos
- 2012–2015: Sporting CP

Senior career*
Years	Team	Apps	(Gls)
2013–2015	Sporting CP	1	(0)
2015–2016	Quinta dos Lombos	13	(8)
2016–2017	AD Fundão	30	(5)
2017–2023	Sporting CP	14	(3)
2017–2018	→ AD Fundão (loan)	28	(12)
2023-2026	FcBarcelona		
2026-	Sporting CP		

International career^{‡}
	Portugal U21	12	(6)
2018–	Portugal	2	(0)
Medal record
Men's futsal
Representing Portugal
UEFA Futsal Championship
Runner-up	2026 Latvia / Lithuania / Slovenia
- * Club domestic league appearances and goals as of 00:00, 10 August 2018 (UTC) ‡ National team caps and goals as of 00:00, 10 August 2018 (UTC)

Erick Olim Mendonça (born 21 July 1995) is a futsal player who plays for Sporting CP. Born in Mexico, he plays for the Portugal national team. Erick was diagnosed with Legg–Calvé–Perthes disease when he was 7 years old and was told it would be very unlikely for him to be able to play futsal again, but after spending the following seven years battling the disease, including time spent in a wheelchair, he made a recovery and returned to futsal.

== Honours ==
- UEFA Futsal Champions League: 2018–19

=== International ===
Portugal

- FIFA Futsal World Cup: 2021
- UEFA Futsal Championship: 2022
- Futsal Finalissima: 2022
