= Deo (futsal player) =

Brazilian futsal player

Personal information
- Full name: André Henrique Justino
- Date of birth: 8 October 1982 (age 44)
- Place of birth: João Pessoa, Brazil
- Height: 1.54 m (5 ft 1 in)
- Position: Winger

Team information
- Current team: Sporting CP
- Number: 10

Senior career*
| Years | Team | Apps | (Gls) |
| 2001 | Cervicá | | |
| 2002–2014 | Sporting CP | 451 | (254) |
| 2014–2016 | KPRF Moskva | | |
| 2016–2020 | Sporting CP | 104 | (28) |
| 2020 | FC Autobergamo | | |
| 2021- | MFC Aktobe | | |
- * Club domestic league appearances and goals as of 00:00, 25 February 2021 (UTC)

André Henrique Justino (born 8 October 1982), commonly known as Deo, is a Brazilian futsal player who plays for MFC Aktobe as a winger.

== Honours ==
- UEFA Futsal Champions League: 2018–19
- 8*Campeonato Nacional da I Divisão de Futsal : 2003–04, 2005–06, 2009–10, 2010–11, 2012–13, 2013–14, 2016–17, 2017–18
