= Eléctrico F.C. (futsal) =

- Full name: Eléctrico Futebol Clube
- Ground: Pavilhão Gimnodesportivo de Ponte de Sor; Ponte de Sor, Portugal
- Capacity: 720
- Chairman: Vítor Martins
- Manager: João Freitas Pinto
- League: Liga Placard
- 2022–23: Overall table: 5th Playoffs: Quarterfinals

Eléctrico Futebol Clube is a futsal team based in the city of Ponte de Sor, Portugal, that plays in the Portuguese Futsal First Division. It is a part of the Eléctrico F.C. sports club. In 2018 Eléctrico F.C. won the South Zone series of the Portuguese II Divisão Futsal achieving the promotion to the first tier Liga Sport Zone for the first time in its history.

== Current squad ==
As of 22 May 2023

| # | Position | Name | Nationality |
|---|---|---|---|
| 17 | Goalkeeper | Diogo Mateus | (Portugal) |
| 30 | Goalkeeper | João Silva | (Portugal) |
| 99 | Goalkeeper | Diogo Basílio | (Portugal) |
| 5 | Defender | Ferrugem | (Brazil) |
| 19 | Defender | Peixinho | (Portugal) |
| 96 | Defender | Ygor Mota | (Brazil) |
| 2 | Winger | Rúben Freire | (Portugal) |
| 6 | Winger | Telmo Lourenço | (Portugal) |
| 10 | Winger | Célio Coque | (Portugal) |
| 11 | Winger | João Lopes | (Portugal) |
| 90 | Winger | Daniel Airoso | (Brazil) |
| 97 | Winger | Vini Rod | (Brazil) |
| 3 | Pivot | António Silva | (Portugal) |
| 20 | Pivot | Tiago Cruz | (Portugal) |
| 77 | Pivot | Simi Saiotti | (Georgia (country)) |
