= Leandro Esquerdinha =

Brazilian futsal player (born 1985)

Personal information
- Date of birth: 18 November 1985 (age 40)
- Place of birth: Brazil
- Height: 1.85 m (6 ft 1 in)
- Position: Forward

Senior career*
Years	Team	Apps	(Gls)
2006–2012	ElPozo Murcia		
2012–2017	Dina Moscow		
2017–2022	Barcelona		

International career
2017–2021	Russia	23	(10)
- * Club domestic league appearances and goals

Leandro Rodrigues Bernardes, aka Leandro Esquerdinha (born Cuiabá-MT 18 November 1985) is a Brazilian-born Russian futsal player who currently plays for Barcelona and the Russia national team.

Esquerdinha previously played for Goias (Brazil), Minas (Brazil), Cartagena Futsal (Spain), Segovia Futsal (Spain), ElPozo Murcia FS (Spain). As of 12.16.2014 he held 91 games and scored 122 goals for Dina Moscow. His 50th game was played on March 22, 2014 in Troitsk in the XXII Championship of Russia against “Norilsk Nickel”. His 50th goal was scored on the 23 of November 2014 in Troitsk in the Russian Championship XXII in a game against “Sibiryak”.

== Achievements ==
- Spanish Cup and Supercup Winner (1): 2009/10
- Russian Futsal Championship Winner (1): 2013/14
- UEFA Futsal Champions League Winner (1): 2019–20
- UEFA Futsal Champions League third place: 2018–19

=== Personal ===
- The best scorer of the Spanish Championship: 2007;
- The best player in the Spanish Championship: 2011;
- The best forward of the regular Spanish Championship: 2012;

For three seasons of 2010-2012 Esquerdinha scored in the Championship of Spain more than hundred goals.
