= Nando (futsal player) =

Brazilian futsal player

Personal information
- Full name: Leandro Henrique Cypriano Catarino de Jesus
- Date of birth: 31 October 1987 (age 38)
- Place of birth: Belo Horizonte, Brazil
- Height: 1.76 m (5 ft 9 in)
- Position: Defender

Team information
- Current team: Norilsk Nickel
- Number: 20

Senior career*
Years	Team	Apps	(Gls)
2007–2012	Minas		
2012–2017	Dinamo Moskva		
2018–2020	Gazprom-Ugra		
2020–2021	KPRF		
2021–2022	Dinamo-Samara		
2022–	Norilsk Nickel		

International career
2022–	Russia		
- * Club domestic league appearances and goals as of 00:00, 9 March 2019 (UTC)

Leandro Henrique Cypriano Catarino de Jesus (born 31 October 1987), known as Nando, is a Brazilian futsal player who plays as a defender for Norilsk Nickel.
