= CRC Quinta dos Lombos =

Quinta dos Lombos
- Full name: Centro Recreativo e Cultural da Quinta dos Lombos
- Ground: Pavilhão Desportivo dos Lombos; Quinta dos Lombos, Portugal
- Capacity: 650
- Chairman: Jorge Manuel Antunes Vieira
- Manager: Rodrigo Barreiros
- League: Liga Placard
- 2022–23: Overall table: 6th Playoffs: Quarterfinals
- Website: http://crcquintadoslombos.pt/

Centro Recreativo e Cultural da Quinta dos Lombos is a sports club based in the village of Quinta dos Lombos, Portugal. The futsal team of Quinta dos Lombos plays in the Portuguese Futsal First Division.

== Futsal ==
=== Current squad ===
As of 22 May 2023

#	Position	Name	Nationality
13	Goalkeeper	Tiago Pinto	(Portugal)
22	Goalkeeper	Gonçalo Moreira	(Portugal)
25	Goalkeeper	Vinícius Schütt	(Brazil)
8	Defender	Eddy Fernandes	(Cape Verde)
23	Defender	Murilo Duarte	(Brazil)
33	Defender	Telmo Sousa	(Portugal)
7	Winger	Paulo Babau	(Portugal)
10	Winger	Rodriguinho	(Qatar)
11	Winger	Kaká	(Brazil)
12	Winger	Danny	(Portugal)
19	Winger	Tiaguinho	(Portugal)
20	Winger	Henrique Vicente	(Portugal)
14	Pivot	Willian Carioca	(Brazil)
17	Pivot	Milton Dias	(Portugal)
18	Pivot	Miguel Conceição	(Portugal)

== Former players ==
- (Portugal) Sandro Azenha (2013–2017)
- (Portugal) Cautela (2011–12)
- (Portugal) Hélder Fernandes (2010–11)
- (Portugal) Marco Mateus (2016–2017)
- (Portugal) Erick Mendonça (2007–12 and 2015–16)
- (Portugal) Hugo Neves (2019–20 and 2020–21)
- Gonçalo Portugal (2016)
