= Almaty Arena =

Indoor arena in Almaty, Kazakhstan

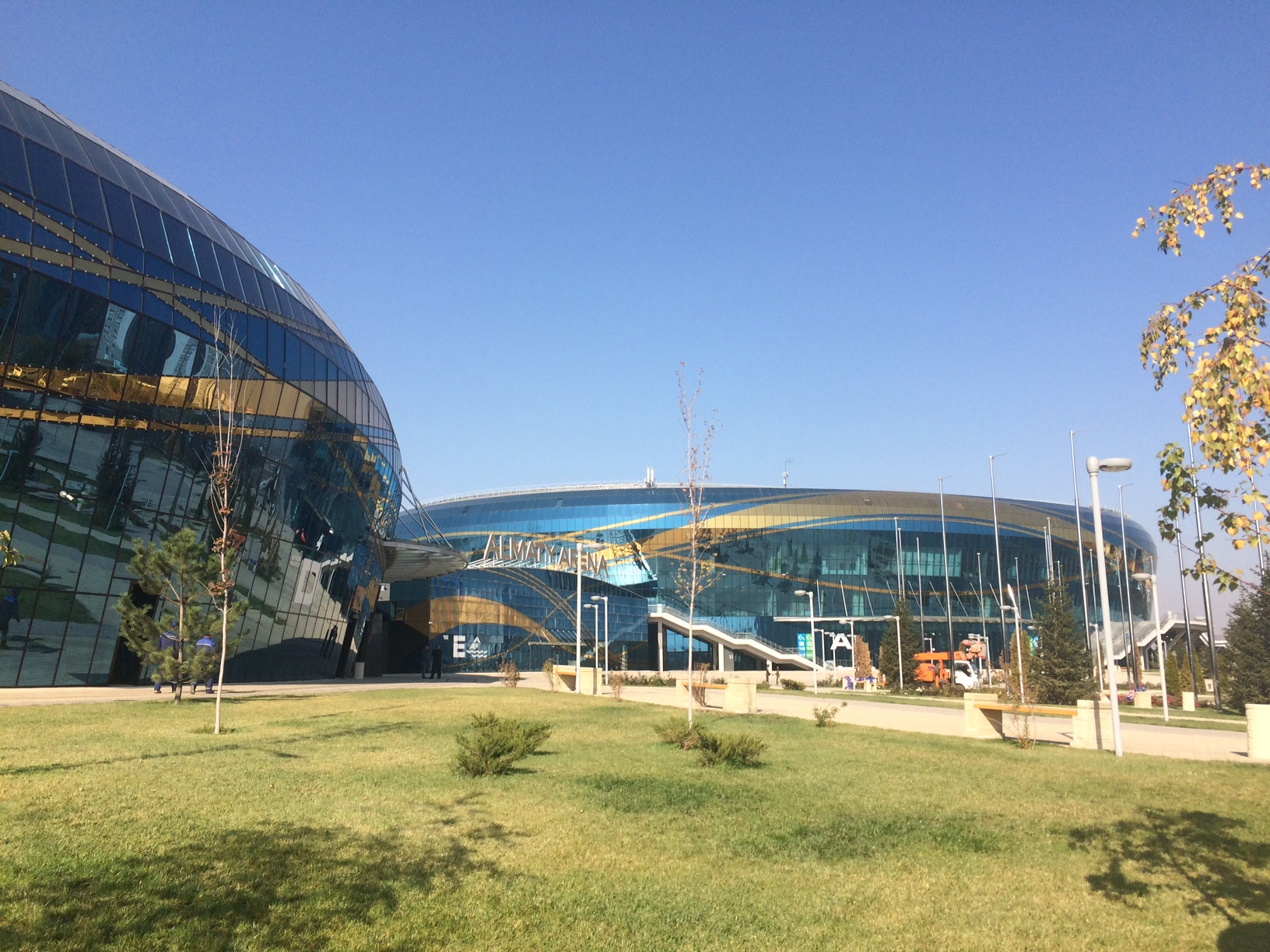
- Almaty Arena complex, January 2018
- Interactive map of Almaty Arena
- Location: Almaty, Kazakhstan
- Coordinates: 43°15′50″N 76°49′03″E
- Owner: City of Almaty
- Operator: City of Almaty
- Capacity: Ice hockey: 12,000
- Field size: 9.96 ha (99,600 m^{2})

Construction
- Groundbreaking: 20 June 2014
- Built: 2014–2016
- Opened: 18 September 2016; 10 years ago
- Cost: $170 million
- General contractor: Bazis A

Tenant
- HC Almaty

Almaty Arena (formerly Almaty Ice Palace) is a multi-purpose indoor arena located in Almaty, Kazakhstan which was opened on 18 September 2016 and seats 12,000 spectators for ice hockey. Apart from hosting ice hockey matches, the arena is venue for basketball, boxing, concerts, curling, figure skating, futsal, MMA, tennis and other events. It is one of the venues to host the 2017 Winter Universiade. The arena is located in the north of punched Ryskulov Avenue, to the west from Momyshuly street in the Alatau District.

== History ==
Almaty's successful bid to host the 2017 Winter Universiade, coupled with its (unsuccessful) bid to host the 2022 Winter Olympics, drove the need to build an ice hockey arena meeting the standards of the International Ice Hockey Federation (IIHF). On 27 March 2014, the city's mayor Akhmetzhan Yessimov announced the building of the new arena for 12,000 spectators and a minor arena for 3,000. The arenas were projected to cost $170 million and $89 million respectively.

It will serve as the main venue of the 2029 Asian Winter Games.

== Structure and facilities ==
The ice palace is the second largest in the CIS with the area of 9.96 ha (1,072,000 sq ft), similar with the Minsk-Arena and smaller than the Bolshoy Ice Dome. The complex consists of three units: the ice arena with 12,000 seats, a training rink with a recreation complex, and a swimming pool. The layout of the ice arena allows it to function as a universal platform for figure skating, ice hockey, boxing, basketball, volleyball, as well as a concert hall with an extra 5,000 seats, in the case of laying thermal insulation covering the entire area of the ice field with about 1,800 m^{2} (19,000 sq ft).

Special attention is given to the technology of ice freezing. 120 cubic metres of water is needed for each rink pouring. The water is pre-treated from various mechanical impurities, iron, chlorine and the salts, and then falls into the softener system and maintain the desired storage temperature. Ice surface is aligned with special ice machines to achieve the desired thickness - 5 cm after a complete freezing.

== Sport events ==
- 2016, October - IV International Kazak Kuresi Championship "Eurasia Barysy
- 2016, October 29 - Pro Boxing Night (Kanat Islam - Patrick Allotey) for the WBO, IBO and WBA Fedelatin titles.
- 2016, December - Kazakhstan Figure Skating Championship
- 2017, April 1 - MMA Fight Nights
- 2017, April - UEFA Futsal Cup Final Four 2016/2017 (Inter, Sporting, Gazprom-Yugra, Kairat).
- 2017, Final stage of National Student Futsal League games
- 2018, December - TITAN FC 51 international MMA tournament
- 2019, March - Professional boxing night with fights for four local WBA and WBC titles
- 2019, March 30 - Ilya Averbukh Ice Show featuring Alexei Yagudin, Elisabeth Tursynbaeva and others.
- 2019, April 26 - 28 - UEFA Champions League Final Four 2018/2019 (Inter, Sporting, Barça, Kairat)
- 2021 - NFC Championship
- 2021 - city cultural and sports festival Almaty Urban Fest
- 2021 2021 - World Curling Cup

== Music events ==
- 2017, June - VIA Gra concert
- 2017, September - VI Eurasian Music Award of the Muzzone TV channel "EMA 2017"
- 2017, September - Platinum ABBA tribute show
- 2018, March - DDT concert
- 2018, May 26 - Scriptonite concert
- 2018, June - "Leningrad" concert
- 2018, October - "Hands Up!" concert
- 2018, November - concert of Garik Sukachev and the Untouchables
- 2019, March - concert of Bi-2

== See also ==
- List of indoor arenas in Kazakhstan
