= São Lourenço do Oeste =

Coordinates: 26°24′S 52°46′W

- Municipality
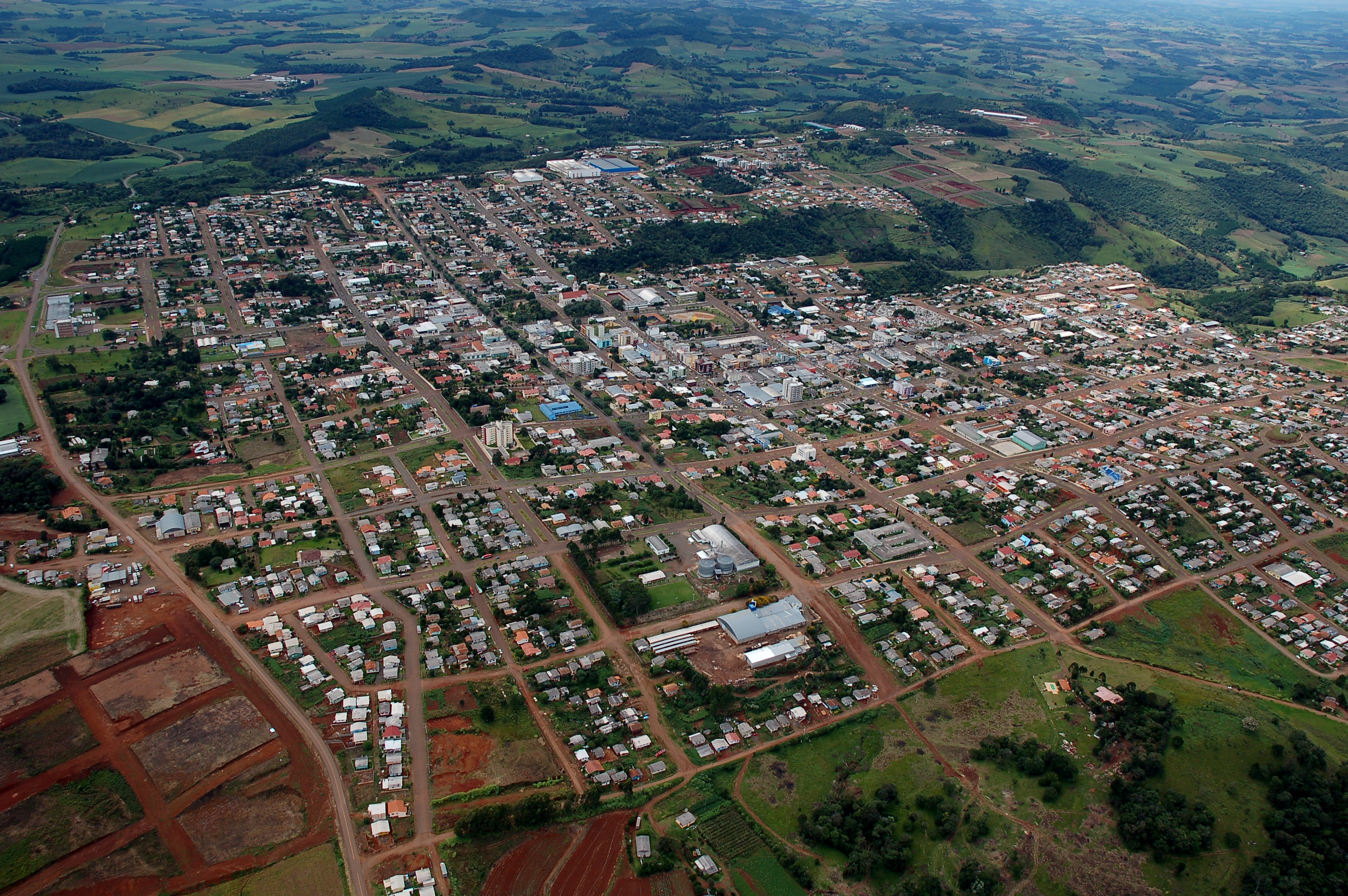

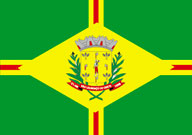
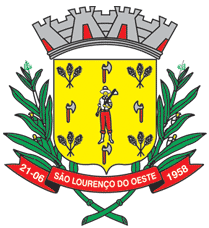
- Flag Coat of arms
- Interactive map of São Lourenço do Oeste
- Country: Brazil
- Region: South
- State: Santa Catarina
- Mesoregion: Oeste Catarinense

Population (2020)
  - Total: 24,291
- Time zone: UTC -3

São Lourenço do Oeste is a municipality in the state of Santa Catarina in the South region of Brazil.

== See also ==
- List of municipalities in Santa Catarina
