= 2023–24 UEFA Futsal Champions League =

38th edition of top European men's futsal competition

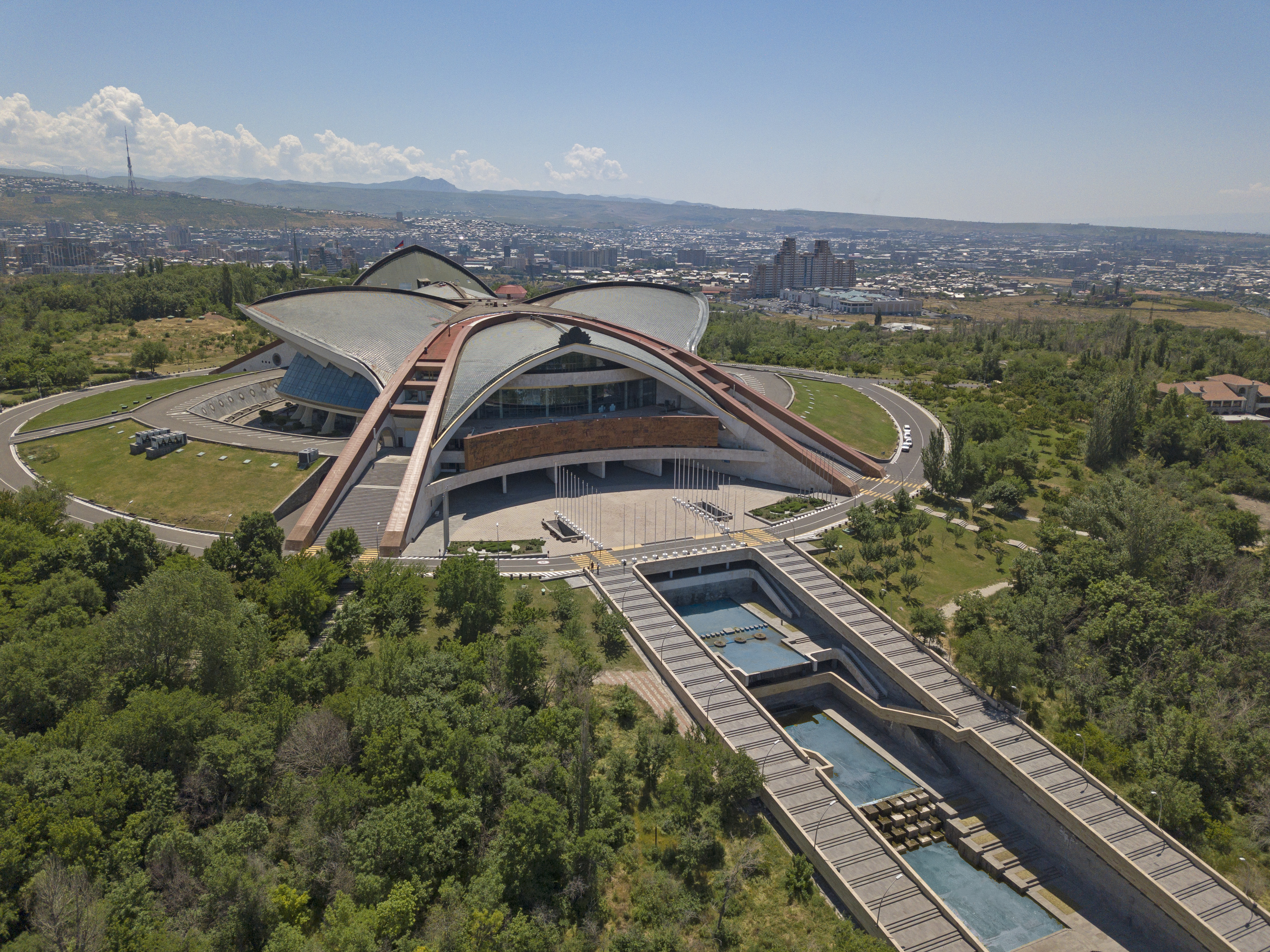
- The Karen Demirchyan Complex in Yerevan hosted the final.

Tournament details
- Dates: Qualifying rounds: 23 August 2023 – 3 December 2023; Final tournament: 3 – 5 May 2024
- Teams: Final tournament: 4 Total: 55 (from 51 associations)

Final positions
- Champions: (Spain) Palma Futsal (2nd title)
- Runners-up: (Spain) Barcelona
- Third place: (Portugal) Benfica
- Fourth place: (Portugal) Sporting CP

Tournament statistics
- Matches played: 121
- Goals scored: 840 (6.94 per match)
- Top scorer(s): Season total: (Brazil) Thalles Henrique (15 goals); Final tournament: (Portugal) Lúcio Rocha (5 goals)
- All statistics correct as of 3 December 2023.

The 2023–24 UEFA Futsal Champions League was the 38th edition of Europe's premier club futsal tournament, and the 23rd edition organized by UEFA. It is also the sixth edition since the tournament was rebranded from "UEFA Futsal Cup" to UEFA Futsal Champions League. The final tournament took place at the Karen Demirchyan Complex in Yerevan, Armenia on 3–5 May 2024.

Palma Futsal are the title holders.

== Association team allocation ==
A total of 55 teams from 51 of the 55 UEFA member associations will participate in the 2023–24 UEFA Futsal Champions League. The association ranking based on the UEFA futsal national team coefficients was used to determine the number of participating teams for each association:

- The top three-ranked associations have two teams qualify.
- The winners of the 2022–23 UEFA Futsal Champions League qualify automatically and its association can also enter a second team. If the title-holders' association is among the top three-ranked associations, the 4th ranked association is also entitled to enter a second team.
- The remaining associations have one team qualify.

For this season, the top three-ranked associations are Portugal, Russia, and Spain. As the title holders are from Spain, the 4th ranked association, Kazakhstan, can enter two teams. After UEFA's decision to exclude Russian clubs from all UEFA competitions due to the 2022 Russian invasion of Ukraine, the right to enter a second team passed to the 5th ranked association, Croatia.

=== Association ranking ===
The UEFA futsal national team coefficients at the end of April 2023, used to determine the number of teams each association was entitled to enter, was as follows.

Association ranking for 2023–24 UEFA Champions League

Rank	Association	Coeff.	Teams
1	Portugal	2697.016	2
2	Russia	2547.159	0
3	Spain (TH)	2494.422	2
4	Kazakhstan	2344.395	2
5	Croatia	2035.784	2
6	Ukraine	2010.147	1
7	Azerbaijan	1977.359	1
8	Serbia	1945.646	1
9	Georgia	1924.716	1
10	Slovenia	1891.854	1
11	Italy	1877.471	1
12	Poland	1845.059	1
13	Romania	1819.600	1
14	Czech Republic	1815.227	1
15	Finland	1814.563	1
16	Slovakia	1804.533	1
17	France	1759.326	1
18	Netherlands	1740.688	1
19	Armenia	1637.739	1

Rank	Association	Coeff.	Teams
20	Hungary	1635.528	1
21	Bosnia and Herzegovina	1609.649	1
22	Belgium	1568.922	1
23	Belarus	1521.865	1
24	Moldova	1514.719	1
25	North Macedonia	1451.512	DNE
26	Germany	1442.547	1
27	Latvia	1387.402	1
28	Sweden	1327.701	1
29	Montenegro	1306.735	1
30	Kosovo	1264.444	1
31	England	1204.183	1
32	Denmark	1199.225	1
33	Lithuania	1195.790	1
34	Albania	1177.965	1
35	Norway	1173.463	1
36	Greece	1164.389	1
37	Turkey	1131.406	1

Rank	Association	Coeff.	Teams
38	Israel	1128.385	1
39	Cyprus	1090.591	1
40	Switzerland	1066.246	1
41	Bulgaria	1031.006	1
42	Wales	1011.432	1
43	Andorra	916.855	1
44	Malta	830.007	1
45	Gibraltar	809.650	1
46	Austria	794.108	1
47	Estonia	787.508	1
48	San Marino	762.906	1
49	Scotland	755.050	1
50	Northern Ireland	717.420	1
NR	Iceland	—	1
NR	Luxembourg	—	1
NR	Republic of Ireland	—	1
NR	Faroe Islands	—	DNE
NR	Liechtenstein	—	DNE

Notes

- TH – Additional berth for title holders
- NR – No rank (association national team had been inactive on the previous 36 months)
- DNE – Did not enter

=== Distribution ===
For the 2023–24 UEFA Futsal Champions League, the clubs' entry round was determined by their UEFA futsal club coefficients, which took into account their performance from the previous three seasons.

Access list for 2023–24 UEFA Futsal Champions League
		Teams entering in this round	Teams advancing from previous round
Preliminary round (32 teams)		32 teams ranked 23–54	
Main round	Path A (16 teams)	Title holders; 15 teams ranked 1–11 and 16–19	
Main round	Path B (16 teams)	7 teams ranked 12–15 and 20–22	8 group winners from preliminary round; Preliminary round best runner-up
Elite round (16 teams)			4 group winners from main round path A; 4 group runners-up from main round path A; 4 group third-placed teams from main round path A; 4 group winners from main round path B
Final tournament (4 teams)			4 group winners from elite round

=== Teams ===
Below are the participating teams of the 2023–24 UEFA Futsal Champions League (with their ranking among participating teams), grouped by their starting round and path for the main round.

Main round Path A
Team	Rank
(Spain) Palma Futsal	TH
(Portugal) Sporting CP	1
(Spain) FC Barcelona	2
(Portugal) Benfica	3
(Kazakhstan) Kairat	4
(Slovenia) FK Dobovec	5
(Belgium) Anderlecht	6
(Croatia) Olmissum	7
(Kazakhstan) Ayat	8
(Hungary) Haladás	9
(Malta) Luxol St Andrews	10
(Romania) United Galați	11
(Serbia) KMF Loznica-Grad	16
(Ukraine) HIT Kyiv	17
(Luxembourg) Differdange 03	18
(France) Étoile Lavalloise	19

Main round Path B
Team	Rank
(Lithuania) Kauno Žalgiris	12
(Czech Republic) SK Plzeň	13
(Italy) Feldi Eboli	14
(Croatia) Futsal Dinamo	15
(Finland) Kampuksen Dynamo	20
(Denmark) JB Futsal Gentofte	21
(Belarus) Stalitsa Minsk	22

Preliminary round
Team	Rank
(Azerbaijan) Araz Naxçivan	23
(Poland) KSC Lubawa	24
(Switzerland) Futsal Minerva	25
(Slovakia) MIMEL Lučenec	26
(Greece) Doukas	27
(Sweden) Örebro SK	28
(Netherlands) FC Eindhoven	29
(Bosnia and Herzegovina) Radnik Bijeljina	30
(Austria) FC Diamant Linz	31
(Kosovo) FC Prishtina 01	32
(Latvia) Riga Futsal Club	33
(Montenegro) KMF Titograd	34
(Armenia) Yerevan FC	35
(Albania) FK Tirana	36
(Estonia) Cosmos Tallinn	37
(Republic of Ireland) Blue Magic Dublin	38
(Georgia (country)) New Vision Georgians	39
(Andorra) FC Encamp	40
(Moldova) Nistru Chișinău	41
(Germany) Jahn Regensburg Futsal	42
(Bulgaria) Amigo Northwest	43
(Norway) Utleira	44
(Cyprus) AEL Futsal	45
(Wales) Cefn Druids	46
(England) Bloomsbury Futsal	47
(Scotland) PYF Saltires	48
(Israel) Tel Aviv Owls	49
(Turkey) Istanbul Şişli	50
(Northern Ireland) Sparta Belfast	51
(San Marino) FC Fiorentino	52
(Iceland) Ísbjörninn	53
(Gibraltar) Europa FC	54

== Format ==
The tournament has a mini-tournament format consisting of three qualifying rounds and the final tournament. The qualifying rounds consisted of the following stages:

- Preliminary round: 32 teams entering this round were divided into eight groups of four teams with the group winners advancing to the next round.
- Main round:
  - Path A: 16 teams entering this round were divided into four groups of four teams, with the group winners, runners-up, and third-placed teams advancing to the next round.
  - Path B: 7 teams that entered in this round and the 9 teams advancing from the preliminary round were divided into four groups of four teams, with the group winners advancing to the next round.
- Elite round: 16 teams advancing from the main round were divided into four groups of four teams, with the group winners qualifying for the final tournament.

In each group, teams played against each other in a single round-robin format hosted by one of the participating teams.

The final tournament is played at a centralized location and consisted of single-legged semi-finals, a third-place play-off, and final. If scores were level at the end of normal time, extra time was played, followed by a penalty shoot-out if the scores remained tied.

=== Tiebreakers ===
Teams were ranked according to points (3 points for a win, 1 point for a draw, 0 points for a loss). If two or more teams were tied on points, the following tiebreaking criteria were applied, in the order given, to determine the rankings (see Article 14 Equality of points – mini-tournaments, Regulations of the UEFA Futsal Champions League):

1. Points in head-to-head matches among the tied teams;
2. Goal difference in head-to-head matches among the tied teams;
3. Goals scored in head-to-head matches among the tied teams;
4. If more than two teams were tied, and after applying all head-to-head criteria above, a subset of teams are still tied, all head-to-head criteria above were reapplied exclusively to this subset of teams;
5. Goal difference in all group matches;
6. Goals scored in all group matches;
7. Disciplinary points (direct red card = 3 points; double yellow card = 3 points; single yellow card = 1 point);
8. UEFA futsal club coefficients.

If two teams that have the same number of points and have scored and conceded the same number of goals play their last mini-tournament match against each other and are still equal at the end of that match, their final rankings are determined by a penalty shoot-out provided that no other teams within the group have the same number of points on completion of the mini-tournament. This procedure is only necessary if a ranking of the teams is required to determine the team which qualifies for the next stage.

== Schedule ==
The schedule of the competition was as follows (all draws were held at the UEFA headquarters in Nyon, Switzerland).

Schedule for 2023–24 UEFA Futsal Champions League
Phase	Round	Draw	Dates
Qualifying stage	Preliminary round	5 July 2023	23–26 August 2023
Qualifying stage	Main round	5 July 2023	24–29 October 2023
Qualifying stage	Elite round	2 November 2023	28 November–3 December 2023
Final tournament	Semi-finals	14 March 2024	3 May 2024
Final tournament	Third-place play-off & final	14 March 2024	5 May 2024

== Preliminary round ==
The draw for the preliminary round was held on 5 July 2023, 14:00 CET. The preliminary round will be played from 23 to 26 August 2023. The winners of each group and best runner-up progress to the main round Path B.

Times are CEST, as listed by UEFA (local times, if different, are in parentheses).

=== Seeding ===
A total of 32 teams played in the preliminary round. Seeding of teams was based on their 2023 UEFA futsal club coefficients. Eight teams were pre-selected as hosts and were first drawn from a separate pot to their corresponding seeding position. The remaining teams were then drawn from their respective pots to their corresponding seeding position. Teams from Armenia & Azerbaijan, and Kosovo & Bosnia and Herzegovina could not be drawn into the same group.

Seeding position 1	Seeding position 2	Seeding position 3	Seeding position 4
(Azerbaijan) Araz Naxçivan; (Poland) KSC Lubawa (H); (Switzerland) Futsal Minerva; (Slovakia) MIMEL Lučenec (H); (Greece) Doukas (H); (Sweden) Örebro SK; (Netherlands) FC Eindhoven; (Bosnia and Herzegovina) Radnik Bijeljina	(Austria) Diamant Linz; (Kosovo) Prishtina 01; (Latvia) Riga Futsal Club (H); (Montenegro) KMF Titograd (H); (Armenia) Yerevan FC; (Albania) FK Tirana (H); (Estonia) Cosmos Tallinn; (Republic of Ireland) Blue Magic Dublin	(Georgia (country)) New Vision Georgians; (Andorra) FC Encamp; (Moldova) Nistru Chișinău; (Germany) Jahn Regensburg; (Bulgaria) Amigo Northwest (H); (Norway) Utleira; (Cyprus) AEL Futsal (H); (Wales) Cefn Druids	(England) Bloomsbury Futsal; (Scotland) PYF Saltires; (Israel) Tel Aviv Owls; (Turkey) Istanbul Şişli; (Northern Ireland) Sparta Belfast; (San Marino) FC Fiorentino; (Iceland) Ísbjörninn; (Gibraltar) Europa FC

Notes

- H – Mini-tournament hosts

=== Group A ===
Pos	Team	Pld	W	D	L	GF	GA	GD	Pts	Qualification
1	(Latvia) Riga Futsal Club (H)	3	3	0	0	33	5	+28	9	Advance to main round
2	(Azerbaijan) Araz Naxçivan	3	2	0	1	17	9	+8	6	
3	(Germany) Jahn Regensburg	3	1	0	2	4	9	−5	3	
4	(Turkey) Istanbul Şişli	3	0	0	3	3	34	−31	0	

Source: UEFA
Rules for classification: Tiebreakers
(H) Hosts
23 August 2023
13:00

Araz Naxçivan (Azerbaijan)	9–1	(Turkey) Istanbul Şişli
Catatau 3'25"; Baghirov 5'53"; Milosavljević 15'49"; Amadeu 21'35", 22'49", 30'05"; Atayev 27'29", 33'05"; Erick Dannilo 35'52"	Report	Çamcı 30'10"

Salaspils Sporta Nams, Salaspils
Attendance: 32
Referee: Arttu Kyynäräinen (Finland),
Dražen Vukčević (Montenegro)
23 August 2023
18:00

Jahn Regensburg (Germany)	1–3	(Latvia) Riga Futsal Club
Marques 8'00"	Report	Kozlovskis 33'22", 36'14"; Ricardinho 36'43"

Salaspils Sporta Nams, Salaspils
Attendance: 507
Referee: Martina Piccolo (Italy),
Georgios Kozakos (Cyprus)

24 August 2023
13:00

Jahn Regensburg (Germany)	0–5	(Azerbaijan) Araz Naxçivan
	Report	Catatau 6'37"; Erick Dannilo 8'07"; Agalizadeh 12'59"; Atayev 25'34"; Baghirov 26'13"

Salaspils Sporta Nams, Salaspils
Attendance: 35
Referee: Dražen Vukčević (Montenegro),
Martina Piccolo (Italy)
24 August 2023
18:00

Riga Futsal Club (Latvia)	22–1	(Turkey) Istanbul Şişli
Thalles Henrique 5'05", 35'07"; Rimkus 7'23", 13'27", 20'43"; Strazdiņš 7'47"; Kuļepovs 10'31", 32'40"; Seņs 15'23", 16'52"; Kozlovskis 19'17", 34'02"; Vaporaki 20'59", 21'57", 28'01"; Yılmaz 24'14" (o.g.); Ricardinho 26'12", 34'52", 35'23"; Serginho 27'31", 28'52"; Mickēvičs 39'13"	Report	Çamcı 34'13"

Salaspils Sporta Nams, Salaspils
Attendance: 416
Referee: Georgios Kozakos (Cyprus),
Arttu Kyynäräinen (Finland)

26 August 2023
11:00

Istanbul Şişli (Turkey)	1–3	(Germany) Jahn Regensburg
Hizli 19'53"	Report	Parasole 28'49"; Poersch 33'53", 37'22"

Salaspils Sporta Nams, Salaspils
Attendance: 29
Referee: Dražen Vukčević (Montenegro),
Georgios Kozakos (Cyprus)
26 August 2023
16:00

Riga Futsal Club (Latvia)	8–3	(Azerbaijan) Araz Naxçivan
Kuzmin 2'30"; Thalles Henrique 10'24"; Serginho 18'26", 27'12"; Strazdiņš 24'38"; Ricardinho 30'05", 39'57"; Labuts 32'54"	Report	Amadeu 14'17", 15'05"; Catatau 33'51"

Salaspils Sporta Nams, Salaspils
Attendance: 600
Referee: Arttu Kyynäräinen (Finland),
Martina Piccolo (Italy)

=== Group B ===
Pos	Team	Pld	W	D	L	GF	GA	GD	Pts	Qualification
1	(Sweden) Örebro SK	3	2	1	0	16	6	+10	7 (Note: Tied on head-to-head points, goal difference, and goals scored. Total goal difference: Örebro SK +10, Amigo Northwest +8.)	Advance to main round
2	(Bulgaria) Amigo Northwest (H)	3	2	1	0	13	5	+8	7	
3	(Austria) Diamant Linz	3	1	0	2	5	9	−4	3	
4	(Israel) Tel Aviv Owls	3	0	0	3	4	18	−14	0	

Source: UEFA
Rules for classification: Tiebreakers
(H) Hosts
Notes:
23 August 2023
14:30

Örebro SK (Sweden)	9–2	(Israel) Tel Aviv Owls
Tauan 3'26", 10'58", 28'55", 37'18"; Sosseh 7'28"; Mieli 7'39", 17'49"; Morales 9'30"; Pirata 31'04"	Report	Ezra 0'12"; Weiss 25'15"

Arena Armeets, Sofia
Attendance: 200
Referee: Peter Budáč (Slovakia),
Aleš Močnik Perič (Slovenia)
23 August 2023
17:00

Diamant Linz (Austria)	1–4	(Bulgaria) Amigo Northwest
Seperović 5'03"	Report	Dobrichov 3'41"; Seniuk 28'10"; Kefa 34'44", 39'32"

Arena Armeets, Sofia
Attendance: 1200
Referee: Josip Barton (North Macedonia),
Eduards Fatkuļins (Latvia)

24 August 2023
14:30

Diamant Linz (Austria)	1–4	(Sweden) Örebro SK
Šimić 39'49"	Report	Morales 3'25"; Mieli 21'07", 28'48"; Palmquist 33'36"

Arena Armeets, Sofia
Attendance: 100
Referee: Aleš Močnik Perič (Slovenia),
Josip Barton (North Macedonia)
24 August 2023
17:00

Amigo Northwest (Bulgaria)	6–1	(Israel) Tel Aviv Owls
Kefa 2'46"; Kostov 30'20"; Stepanov 30'32"; Seniuk 31'44"; Luiz Fernando 36'21"; Dobrichov 39'26"	Report	Ezra 6'55"

Arena Armeets, Sofia
Attendance: 800
Referee: Eduards Fatkuļins (Latvia),
Peter Budáč (Slovakia)

26 August 2023
10:00

Tel Aviv Owls (Israel)	1–3	(Austria) Diamant Linz
Levi 9'13"	Report	Dinar 11'29" (o.g.); Rozic 29'26", 35'56"

Arena Armeets, Sofia
Attendance: 80
Referee: Josip Barton (North Macedonia),
Peter Budáč (Slovakia)
26 August 2023
13:00

Amigo Northwest (Bulgaria)	3–3	(Sweden) Örebro SK
Seniuk 3'13"; Dobrichov 6'26"; Stepanov 19'36"	Report	Pirata 7'39"; Tauan 19'02"; Mieli 26'38"

Arena Armeets, Sofia
Attendance: 1650
Referee: Aleš Močnik Perič (Slovenia),
Eduards Fatkuļins (Latvia)

=== Group C ===
Pos	Team	Pld	W	D	L	GF	GA	GD	Pts	Qualification
1	(Montenegro) KMF Titograd (H)	3	3	0	0	13	6	+7	9	Advance to main round
2	(Georgia (country)) New Vision Georgians	3	2	0	1	11	4	+7	6	
3	(Netherlands) FC Eindhoven	3	1	0	2	7	10	−3	3	
4	(Gibraltar) Europa FC	3	0	0	3	1	12	−11	0	

Source: UEFA
Rules for classification: Tiebreakers
(H) Hosts
23 August 2023
17:00

FC Eindhoven (Netherlands)	5–0	(Gibraltar) Europa FC
Ceyar 1'29"; Boukhari 2'40"; Bouzambou 26'13"; Van Houtum 27'02"; Oliveira 30'21"	Report

Verde Complex, Podgorica
Attendance: 50
Referee: Ozan Soykan (Turkey),
Sviatoslav Kliuchnyk (Ukraine)
23 August 2023
20:30

New Vision Georgians (Georgia (country))	3–4	(Montenegro) KMF Titograd
Todua 9'53", 15'47"; Gabrichidze 39'50"	Report	Cimbaljević 13'43", 28'52", 36'19"; Delić 15'07"

Verde Complex, Podgorica
Attendance: 300
Referee: Mantas Pomeckis (Lithuania),
Laurenţiu Deaconu (Romania)

24 August 2023
17:00

New Vision Georgians (Georgia (country))	5–0	(Netherlands) FC Eindhoven
Todua 1'16"; Roninho 8'03" (pen.); Jvarashvili 25'04", 37'45"; Tophuria 37'29"	Report

Verde Complex, Podgorica
Attendance: 50
Referee: Laurenţiu Deaconu (Romania),
Ozan Soykan (Turkey)
24 August 2023
20:30

KMF Titograd (Montenegro)	4–1	(Gibraltar) Europa FC
Krstevski 12'59"; Rakić 22'33"; Delić 30'48"; Bulatović 34'55"	Report	Caravante 27'35"

Verde Complex, Podgorica
Attendance: 150
Referee: Sviatoslav Kliuchnyk (Ukraine),
Mantas Pomeckis (Lithuania)

26 August 2023
17:00

Europa FC (Gibraltar)	0–3	(Georgia (country)) New Vision Georgians
	Report	Gabrichidze 8'08"; Makhmadaminov 9'49"; Kekelia 10'56"

Verde Complex, Podgorica
Attendance: 15
Referee: Sviatoslav Kliuchnyk (Ukraine),
Laurenţiu Deaconu (Romania)
26 August 2023
20:30

KMF Titograd (Montenegro)	5–2	(Netherlands) FC Eindhoven
Gosto 2'43", 27'00"; Marković 29'51"; Cimbaljević 38'09", 38'55"	Report	Ceyar 19'54"; Boukhari 33'14" (pen.)

Verde Complex, Podgorica
Attendance: 200
Referee: Ozan Soykan (Turkey),
Mantas Pomeckis (Lithuania)

=== Group D ===
Pos	Team	Pld	W	D	L	GF	GA	GD	Pts	Qualification
1	(Kosovo) Prishtina 01	3	2	1	0	17	3	+14	7 (Note: Tied on head-to-head points, goal difference, goals scored, and total goal difference. Total goals scored: Prishtina 01 = 17 goals, KSC Lubawa = 15 goals.)	Advance to main round
2	(Poland) KSC Lubawa (H)	3	2	1	0	15	1	+14	7	Advance to main round
3	(Norway) Utleira	3	1	0	2	7	12	−5	3	
4	(Iceland) Ísbjörninn	3	0	0	3	2	25	−23	0	

Source: UEFA
Rules for classification: Tiebreakers
(H) Hosts
Notes:
23 August 2023
16:00

Prishtina 01 (Kosovo)	11–1	(Iceland) Ísbjörninn
Selmanaj 8'16"; Kryeziu 12'43"; Mazreku 13'24", 31'55"; Qerimi 13'45"; Maxharraj 15'16", 22'57"; Krasniqi 21'04"; Argote 26'39" (o.g.); Kaqandolli 37'17", 37'54"	Report	Reta 8'28"

Hala Widowiskowo-Sportowa, Lubawa
Attendance: 149
Referee: Bogdan Hanceariuc (Romania),
Péter Zimonyi (Hungary)
23 August 2023
19:30

Utleira (Norway)	0–6	(Poland) KSC Lubawa
	Report	Pedrinho 2'09"; Raszkowski 7'53", 23'11"; Halvorsen 11'27" (o.g.); Sendlewski 21'53"; Kriezel 32'03"

Hala Widowiskowo-Sportowa, Lubawa
Attendance: 489
Referee: Gordon McCabe (Scotland),
Carl Hughes (Wales)

24 August 2023
16:00

Utleira (Norway)	1–5	(Kosovo) Prishtina 01
Johansen 32'34"	Report	Alaj 1'08"; Selmanaj 9'57"; Qerimi 15'45"; Maxharraj 23'23"; Kryeziu 28'03"

Hala Widowiskowo-Sportowa, Lubawa
Attendance: 79
Referee: Carl Hughes (Wales),
Bogdan Hanceariuc (Romania)
24 August 2023
19:30

KSC Lubawa (Poland)	8–0	(Iceland) Ísbjörninn
A. Lemos 4'01"; Claudinho 9'04", 9'31"; Kriezel 11'26"; López 19'28"; Grubalski 24'11"; Doša 24'39"; Pedrinho 39'44"	Report

Hala Widowiskowo-Sportowa, Lubawa
Attendance: 440
Referee: Péter Zimonyi (Hungary),
Gordon McCabe (Scotland)

26 August 2023
14:00

Ísbjörninn (Iceland)	1–6	(Norway) Utleira
Reta 32'19"	Report	Welo 4'02", 22'06"; Kvalvær 7'47"; Argote 17'14" (o.g.); Andreassen 19'21"; Halvorsen 31'25"

Hala Widowiskowo-Sportowa, Lubawa
Attendance: 31
Referee: Carl Hughes (Wales),
Péter Zimonyi (Hungary)
26 August 2023
17:30

KSC Lubawa (Poland)	1–1	(Kosovo) Prishtina 01
Sendlewski 7'16"	Report	Maxharraj 14'45"

Hala Widowiskowo-Sportowa, Lubawa
Attendance: 469
Referee: Gordon McCabe (Scotland),
Bogdan Hanceariuc (Romania)

=== Group E ===
Pos	Team	Pld	W	D	L	GF	GA	GD	Pts	Qualification
1	(Slovakia) MIMEL Lučenec (H)	3	2	1	0	14	6	+8	7 (Note: Tied on head-to-head points, goal difference, and goals scored. Total goal difference: MIMEL Lučenec +8, Cosmos Tallinn +6.)	Advance to main round
2	(Estonia) Cosmos Tallinn	3	2	1	0	13	7	+6	7	
3	(Scotland) PYF Saltires	3	1	0	2	9	12	−3	3	
4	(Andorra) FC Encamp	3	0	0	3	2	13	−11	0	

Source: UEFA
Rules for classification: Tiebreakers
(H) Hosts
Notes:
23 August 2023
16:00

Cosmos Tallinn (Estonia)	5–2	(Scotland) PYF Saltires
Ivanov 11'17"; Quevedo 15'28"; Romero 24'36", 33'09", 38'13"	Report	McLaren 32'26", 36'46"

Športová Hala Arena, Lučenec
Attendance: 100
Referee: Javier Moreno (Spain),
Arlind Subashi (Albania)
23 August 2023
19:00

FC Encamp (Andorra)	1–3	(Slovakia) MIMEL Lučenec
Ferreira 19'36"	Report	Ostrák 1'05"; Belaník 1'51"; Washington Luiz 16'50"

Športová Hala Arena, Lučenec
Attendance: 600
Referee: Paweł Tokarewicz (Poland),
Jacob Van Dijke (Netherlands)

24 August 2023
16:00

FC Encamp (Andorra)	1–4	(Estonia) Cosmos Tallinn
Katerynin 1'12" (o.g.)	Report	Tšernei 12'22"; Romero 15'08"; Katerynin 15'40", 36'59"

Športová Hala Arena, Lučenec
Attendance: 100
Referee: Jacob Van Dijke (Netherlands),
Javier Moreno (Spain)
24 August 2023
19:00

MIMEL Lučenec (Slovakia)	7–1	(Scotland) PYF Saltires
Leovski 5'54", 35'03"; Belaník 6'15"; Fehervári 11'41"; Marík 14'25"; McLaren 29'12" (o.g.); Moreno 36'27"	Report	Grcić 18'52" (o.g.)

Športová Hala Arena, Lučenec
Attendance: 550
Referee: Arlind Subashi (Albania),
Paweł Tokarewicz (Poland)

26 August 2023
16:00

PYF Saltires (Scotland)	6–0	(Andorra) FC Encamp
McLaren 5'52", 29'11"; Aloulou 17'23"; Steedman 31'18"; Brand 34'26"; Laurie 36'04"	Report

Športová Hala Arena, Lučenec
Attendance: 50
Referee: Jacob Van Dijke (Netherlands),
Paweł Tokarewicz (Poland)
26 August 2023
19:00

MIMEL Lučenec (Slovakia)	4–4	(Estonia) Cosmos Tallinn
Moreno 9'17"; Belaník 14'55"; Washington Luiz 37'54"; Leovski 39'49"	Report	Katerynin 12'16"; Ivanov 16'39"; Quevedo 17'59"; Tšernei 34'59"

Športová Hala Arena, Lučenec
Attendance: 800
Referee: Javier Moreno (Spain),
Arlind Subashi (Albania)

=== Group F ===
Pos	Team	Pld	W	D	L	GF	GA	GD	Pts	Qualification
1	(Greece) Doukas (H)	3	3	0	0	14	4	+10	9	Advance to main round
2	(Republic of Ireland) Blue Magic Dublin	3	1	1	1	9	9	0	4	
3	(Moldova) Nistru Chișinău	3	1	1	1	6	8	−2	4	
4	(England) Bloomsbury Futsal	3	0	0	3	4	12	−8	0	

Source: UEFA
Rules for classification: Tiebreakers
(H) Hosts
23 August 2023
15:00

Blue Magic Dublin (Republic of Ireland)	5–0	(England) Bloomsbury Futsal
Calderón 23'11", 38'28"; Micoski 37'52", 39'07" (pen.); Soares 39'28"	Report

Dais Sports Hall, Athens
Attendance: 51
Referee: Stephen Vella (Malta),
Maximilian Alkofer (Germany)
23 August 2023
18:00

Nistru Chișinău (Moldova)	0–4	(Greece) Doukas
	Report	Biel 6'33", 39'02"; Neto Lira 14'24"; Tsinas 21'31"

Dais Sports Hall, Athens
Attendance: 207
Referee: Nebojša Panić (Serbia),
Maksim Dzeikala (Belarus)

24 August 2023
15:00

Nistru Chișinău (Moldova)	2–2	(Republic of Ireland) Blue Magic Dublin
Fabinho 31'21", 32'55"	Report	Calderón 23'45", 38'59"

Dais Sports Hall, Athens
Attendance: 56
Referee: Maksim Dzeikala (Belarus),
Stephen Vella (Malta)
24 August 2023
18:00

Doukas (Greece)	3–2	(England) Bloomsbury Futsal
Tsinas 14'50"; Biel 20'41"; Martins 21'12"	Report	Palfreeman 11'18"; Walsh 23'56"

Dais Sports Hall, Athens
Attendance: 174
Referee: Maximilian Alkofer (Germany),
Nebojša Panić (Serbia)

26 August 2023
15:00

Bloomsbury Futsal (England)	2–4	(Moldova) Nistru Chișinău
Amorim 7'04"; Millar 20'24"	Report	Oliveira 29'41", 39'56"; Tacot 30'42", 35'09"

Dais Sports Hall, Athens
Attendance: 92
Referee: Stephen Vella (Malta),
Maximilian Alkofer (Germany)
26 August 2023
18:00

Doukas (Greece)	7–2	(Republic of Ireland) Blue Magic Dublin
Karydas 9'18"; Pett 19'20", 23'51"; Neto Lira 36'08"; Ensi 36'49", 39'28"; Cardoso 38'18" (o.g.)	Report	Micoski 21'04"; Tardelli 38'55"

Dais Sports Hall, Athens
Attendance: 246
Referee: Maksim Dzeikala (Belarus),
Nebojša Panić (Serbia)

=== Group G ===
Pos	Team	Pld	W	D	L	GF	GA	GD	Pts	Qualification
1	(Cyprus) AEL Futsal (H)	3	2	1	0	15	4	+11	7	Advance to main round
2	(Switzerland) Futsal Minerva	3	1	1	1	10	9	+1	4	
3	(San Marino) FC Fiorentino	3	0	2	1	2	7	−5	2	
4	(Armenia) Yerevan FC	3	0	2	1	5	12	−7	2	

Source: UEFA
Rules for classification: Tiebreakers
(H) Hosts
23 August 2023
16:00

Futsal Minerva (Switzerland)	5–0	(San Marino) FC Fiorentino
Kosmann 0'29"; Konopek 4'27", 32'40"; Fideršek 8'47"; Eleotério 37'58"	Report

Spyros Kyprianou Arena, Limassol
Attendance: 50
Referee: Trayan Enchev (Bulgaria),
Panagiotis Ntalas (Greece)
23 August 2023
19:00

Yerevan FC (Armenia)	1–8	(Cyprus) AEL Futsal
Hakobyan 9'07"	Report	Batata 2'00", 3'52", 11'45", 22'55"; Fabrício Lima 24'18"; Skarparis 25'49", 37'13"; Chadjigeorgiou 31'33"

Spyros Kyprianou Arena, Limassol
Attendance: 400
Referee: Kastriot Gerxhaliu (Sweden),
Nikola Tadić (Bosnia and Herzegovina)

24 August 2023
16:00

Yerevan FC (Armenia)	4–4	(Switzerland) Futsal Minerva
Melikyan 2'33", 10'37", 33'20"; Dermenjyan 29'26"	Report	Konopek 11'32"; Fideršek 23'06", 23'42"; Zakaryan 37'57" (o.g.)

Spyros Kyprianou Arena, Limassol
Attendance: 50
Referee: Nikola Tadić (Bosnia and Herzegovina), Trayan Enchev (Bulgaria)
24 August 2023
19:00

AEL Futsal (Cyprus)	2–2	(San Marino) FC Fiorentino
Batata 22'11"; Fabrício Lima 23'11"	Report	Ercolani 28'46" (pen.); Busignani 34'08"

Spyros Kyprianou Arena, Limassol
Attendance: 602
Referee: Panagiotis Ntalas (Greece),
Kastriot Gerxhaliu (Sweden)

26 August 2023
16:00

FC Fiorentino (San Marino)	0–0	(Armenia) Yerevan FC
	Report

Spyros Kyprianou Arena, Limassol
Attendance: 50
Referee: Kastriot Gerxhaliu (Sweden),
Nikola Tadić (Bosnia and Herzegovina)
26 August 2023
19:00

AEL Futsal (Cyprus)	5–1	(Switzerland) Futsal Minerva
Fabrício Lima 3'59", 28'05", 37'59"; Batata 15'00", 39'45"	Report	Pereira 25'37"

Spyros Kyprianou Arena, Limassol
Attendance: 550
Referee: Trayan Enchev (Bulgaria),
Panagiotis Ntalas (Greece)

=== Group H ===
Pos	Team	Pld	W	D	L	GF	GA	GD	Pts	Qualification
1	(Bosnia and Herzegovina) Radnik Bijeljina	2	2	0	0	23	4	+19	6	Advance to main round
2	(Albania) FK Tirana (H)	2	1	0	1	9	10	−1	3	
3	(Northern Ireland) Sparta Belfast	2	0	0	2	5	23	−18	0	
4	(Wales) Cefn Druids	0	0	0	0	0	0	0	0	Withdrew

Source: UEFA
Rules for classification: Tiebreakers
(H) Hosts
23 August 2023
17:00

Radnik Bijeljina (Bosnia and Herzegovina)	16–2	(Northern Ireland) Sparta Belfast
Pavlović 0'22", 37'42"; Marinković 4'54", 15'26", 16'35", 21'02", 21'29", 22'21", 35'24", 36'48"; S. Hodžić 11'01", 11'43"; Jović 12'13"; Rakić 29'28"; Ružičić 32'27"; E. Hodžić 38'56"	Report	Roohi 14'43"; Wilson 26'14"

Tirana Olympic Park, Tirana
Attendance: 34
Referee: Knyaz Amiraslanov (Azerbaijan),
Zviad Bliadze (Georgia)

24 August 2023
20:45

FK Tirana (Albania)	7–3	(Northern Ireland) Sparta Belfast
Kelmendi 1'56", 39'00"; Gashi 7'56"; Wilson 8'18" (o.g.); Mejzini 26'50"; Pishtani 27'09"; Jonuzi 32'32"	Report	McMenemy 10'39"; Lowry 21'49"; Gibson 31'51"

Tirana Olympic Park, Tirana
Attendance: 83
Referee: Zviad Bliadze (Georgia),
Jan Kresta (Czech Republic)

26 August 2023
20:45

FK Tirana (Albania)	2–7	(Bosnia and Herzegovina) Radnik Bijeljina
Mejzini 5'05"; Gashi 16'20"	Report	Marinković 3'49", 15'31", 22'14", 27'36"; Pavlović 5'18"; E. Hodžić 30'21"; Rakić 38'10"

Tirana Olympic Park, Tirana
Attendance: 101
Referee: Jan Kresta (Czech Republic),
Knyaz Amiraslanov (Azerbaijan)

=== Ranking of second-placed teams ===
Pos	Grp	Team	Pld	W	D	L	GF	GA	GD	Pts	Qualification
1	D	(Poland) KSC Lubawa	3	2	1	0	15	1	+14	7	Advance to main round
2	B	(Bulgaria) Amigo Northwest	3	2	1	0	13	5	+8	7	
3	E	(Estonia) Cosmos Tallinn	3	2	1	0	13	7	+6	7	
4	A	(Azerbaijan) Araz Naxçivan	3	2	0	1	17	9	+8	6	
5	C	(Georgia (country)) New Vision Georgians	3	2	0	1	11	4	+7	6	
6	G	(Switzerland) Futsal Minerva	3	1	1	1	10	9	+1	4	
7	F	(Republic of Ireland) Blue Magic Dublin	3	1	1	1	9	9	0	4	
8	H	(Albania) FK Tirana	2	1	0	1	9	10	−1	3	

Source: UEFA
Rules for classification: 1) points; 2) goal difference; 3) goals scored; 4) disciplinary points; 5) coefficient ranking; 6) drawing of lots.

== Main round ==
The draw for the preliminary round was held on 5 July 2023, 14:00 CET.The main round will be played from 24 to 29 October 2023.

Times are CEST, as listed by UEFA (local times, if different, are in parentheses).

=== Seeding ===
A total of 32 teams played in the main round. They were divided in two paths:

- Path A (16 teams): The title holders and teams ranked 1–11 and 16–19. The top three teams on each group proceed to the elite round.
- Path B (16 teams): Teams ranked 12–15 and 20-22 and 9 teams advancing from the preliminary round. The winners of each group move on to the elite round.

Seeding of teams was based on their 2023 UEFA futsal club coefficients. On Path B, the teams ranked 12th to 15th were in seeding position 1 and those ranked 20th to 22nd in position 2, along with one preliminary round winner. The remaining preliminary round winners were in a further pot to fill positions 3 and 4, while the best preliminary round runner-up is pre-allocated into Group 5 position 4.

Eight teams (four in each path) were pre-selected as hosts and were first drawn from a separate pot to their corresponding seeding position. The remaining teams were then drawn from their respective pots to their corresponding seeding position. Teams from Armenia & Azerbaijan, and Kosovo & Bosnia and Herzegovina could not be drawn into the same group.

Path A
Seeding position 1	Seeding position 2	Seeding position 3	Seeding position 4
(Spain) Palma Futsal (H); (Portugal) Sporting CP; (Spain) FC Barcelona; (Portugal) Benfica	(Kazakhstan) Kairat; (Slovenia) FK Dobovec (H); (Belgium) Anderlecht; (Croatia) Olmissum (H)	(Kazakhstan) Ayat; (Hungary) Haladás; (Malta) Luxol St Andrews; (Romania) United Galați	(Serbia) KMF Loznica-Grad (H); (Ukraine) HIT Kyiv; (Luxembourg) Differdange 03; (France) Étoile Lavalloise

Path B
Seeding position 1	Seeding position 2	Seeding positions 2 (one club), 3 and 4	
(Lithuania) Kauno Žalgiris (H); (Czech Republic) SK Plzeň (H); (Italy) Feldi Eboli (H); (Croatia) Futsal Dinamo (H)	(Finland) Kampuksen Dynamo; (Denmark) Futsal Gentofte; (Belarus) Stalitsa Minsk	(Latvia) Riga Futsal Club; (Sweden) Örebro SK; (Montenegro) KMF Titograd; (Kosovo) Prishtina 01; (Slovakia) MIMEL Lučenec	(Greece) Doukas; (Cyprus) AEL Futsal; (Bosnia and Herzegovina) Radnik Bijeljina; (Poland) KSC Lubawa

Notes

- H – Mini-tournament hosts

=== Path A ===
==== Group 1 ====
Pos	Team	Pld	W	D	L	GF	GA	GD	Pts	Qualification
1	(Portugal) Sporting CP	3	2	1	0	14	5	+9	7	Advance to elite round
2	(Ukraine) HIT Kyiv	3	1	2	0	8	5	+3	5	Advance to elite round
3	(Croatia) Olmissum (H)	3	1	0	2	6	12	−6	3	Advance to elite round
4	(Kazakhstan) Ayat	3	0	1	2	5	11	−6	1	

Source: UEFA
Rules for classification: Tiebreakers
(H) Hosts
25 October 2023
11:00

Sporting CP (Portugal)	2–2	(Ukraine) HIT Kyiv
Zicky Té 14'09"; João Matos 26'45"	Report	Abakshyn 14'54", 35'22"

Ribnjak Sports Hall, Omiš
Referee: Vlad Nicolae Ciobanu (Romania),
Josip Barton (North Macedonia)
25 October 2023
15:00

Ayat (Kazakhstan)	2–3	(Croatia) Olmissum
Luan Marcelo 24'22"; Lucas Ian 36'05"	Report	Bukovec 19'32"; Sekulić 27'42", 28'29"

Ribnjak Sports Hall, Omiš
Referee: Kirill Naishouler (Finland),
Jan Kresta (Czech Republic)

26 October 2023
11:00

Ayat (Kazakhstan)	1–6	(Portugal) Sporting CP
Valiullin 12'25"	Report	Zicky Té 9'05"; João Matos 9'22"; Taynan 11'06", 18'46", 21'46"; Merlim 15'06" (pen.)

Ribnjak Sports Hall, Omiš
Referee: Jan Kresta (Czech Republic),
Vlad Nicolae Ciobanu (Romania)
26 October 2023
15:00

Olmissum (Croatia)	1–4	(Ukraine) HIT Kyiv
Kustura 0'45"	Report	Pediash 36'24", 37'18"; Sukhov 38'18", 38'42"

Ribnjak Sports Hall, Omiš
Referee: Josip Barton (North Macedonia),
Kirill Naishouler (Finland)

28 October 2023
11:00

HIT Kyiv (Ukraine)	2–2	(Kazakhstan) Ayat
Siryi 38'15" (pen.); Melnyk 39'43"	Report	Abdumanapuly 6'12"; Kozyrchikov 19'12"

Ribnjak Sports Hall, Omiš
Referee: Jan Kresta (Czech Republic),
Kirill Naishouler (Finland)
28 October 2023
15:00

Olmissum (Croatia)	2–6	(Portugal) Sporting CP
Žilić 13'31"; Bukovec 39'04"	Report	Zicky Té 0'43", 10'02"; Merlim 18'56"; Tomás Paçó 21'27", 30'54"; Taynan 26'25"

Ribnjak Sports Hall, Omiš
Referee: Josip Barton (North Macedonia),
Vlad Nicolae Ciobanu (Romania)

==== Group 2 ====
Pos	Team	Pld	W	D	L	GF	GA	GD	Pts	Qualification
1	(Spain) FC Barcelona	3	3	0	0	10	1	+9	9	Advance to elite round
2	(Belgium) Anderlecht	3	2	0	1	8	4	+4	6	Advance to elite round
3	(Serbia) KMF Loznica-Grad (H)	3	1	0	2	4	5	−1	3	Advance to elite round
4	(Malta) Luxol St Andrews	3	0	0	3	2	14	−12	0	

Source: UEFA
Rules for classification: Tiebreakers
(H) Hosts
25 October 2023
12:30

FC Barcelona (Spain)	6–0	(Malta) Luxol St Andrews
Adolfo 8'21"; Pito 12'51"; Catela 15'36", 30'38"; Álex 17'37", 18'56"	Report

Lagator Hall, Loznica
Referee: Talgat Kosmukhambetov (Kazakhstan), Damian Grabowski (Poland)
25 October 2023
15:30

Anderlecht (Belgium)	2–1	(Serbia) KMF Loznica-Grad
Tomić 22'46"; Saura 33'54"	Report	Baručija 17'39"

Lagator Hall, Loznica
Referee: Vasilios Christodoulis (Greece),
Daniel Matkovic (Switzerland)

26 October 2023
12:30

Anderlecht (Belgium)	1–2	(Spain) FC Barcelona
Gréllo 24'11" (pen.)	Report	Pito 29'30"; Adolfo 31'51"

Lagator Hall, Loznica
Referee: Damian Grabowski (Poland),
Vasilios Christodoulis (Greece)
26 October 2023
15:30

KMF Loznica-Grad (Serbia)	3–1	(Malta) Luxol St Andrews
Rosić 19'18"; Radovanović 34'02"; Machado 36'26"	Report	C. Alves 28'39"

Lagator Hall, Loznica
Referee: Daniel Matkovic (Switzerland),
Talgat Kosmukhambetov (Kazakhstan)

28 October 2023
12:30

Luxol St Andrews (Malta)	1–5	(Belgium) Anderlecht
Paulo André 10'43"	Report	Vilela 7'30"; Marcênio 11'18"; Edu 13'37"; Roncáglio 34'43"; Gréllo 39'51"

Lagator Hall, Loznica
Referee: Talgat Kosmukhambetov (Kazakhstan), Vasilios Christodoulis (Greece)
28 October 2023
15:30

KMF Loznica-Grad (Serbia)	0–2	(Spain) FC Barcelona
	Report	S. González 23'08"; Adolfo 38'06"

Lagator Hall, Loznica
Referee: Daniel Matkovic (Switzerland),
Damian Grabowski (Poland)

==== Group 3 ====
Pos	Team	Pld	W	D	L	GF	GA	GD	Pts	Qualification
1	(Spain) Palma Futsal (H)	3	3	0	0	16	8	+8	9	Advance to elite round
2	(Kazakhstan) Kairat	3	1	1	1	9	8	+1	4	Advance to elite round
3	(Hungary) Haladás	3	0	2	1	4	6	−2	2	Advance to elite round
4	(Luxembourg) Differdange 03	3	0	1	2	7	14	−7	1	

Source: UEFA
Rules for classification: Tiebreakers
(H) Hosts
26 October 2023
12:00

Kairat (Kazakhstan)	4–2	(Luxembourg) Differdange 03
Tursagulov 5'06"; Cavalcanti 9'02"; Alisson Lima 12'54", 38'08"	Report	Rúben Reis 10'27"; A. Rojas 20'32"

Palau Son Moix, Palma de Mallorca
Referee: Aleš Mocnik Peric (Slovenia),
Daniele D'adamo (San Marino)
26 October 2023
15:00

Haladás (Hungary)	1–3	(Spain) Palma Futsal
Sipos 2'35"	Report	Fabinho 13'55" (pen.); Chaguinha 30'46"; Bruno Gomes 35'59"

Palau Son Moix, Palma de Mallorca
Referee: Nicola Manzione (Italy),
Dominykas Norkus (Lithuania)

27 October 2023
12:00

Haladás (Hungary)	2–2	(Kazakhstan) Kairat
Dróth 4'03"; A. Santos 39'59"	Report	Akbalikov 15'04"; Alex Viana 20'34"

Palau Son Moix, Palma de Mallorca
Referee: Dominykas Norkus (Lithuania),
Aleš Mocnik Peric (Slovenia)
27 October 2023
15:00

Palma Futsal (Spain)	9–4	(Luxembourg) Differdange 03
Tayyebi 2'16", 10'58"; Chaguinha 3'54"; Vilian 12'14", 15'08"; Aghapour 17'30"; Gordillo 18'09", 25'05"; Oladghobad 19'04"	Report	D. Garrido 5'04"; R. Bocum 28'31"; Bruno Felipe 33'41"; Pedro Gomes 35'16"

Palau Son Moix, Palma de Mallorca
Referee: Daniele D'adamo (San Marino),
Nicola Manzione (Italy)

29 October 2023
12:30

Differdange 03 (Luxembourg)	1–1	(Hungary) Haladás
R. Bocum 17'45" (pen.)	Report	A. Santos 27'55"

Palau Son Moix, Palma de Mallorca
Referee: Aleš Mocnik Peric (Slovenia),
Daniele D'adamo (San Marino)
29 October 2023
15:30

Palma Futsal (Spain)	4–3	(Kazakhstan) Kairat
Rômulo 1'55"; Bruno Gomes 13'22"; Fabinho 14'00" (pen.), 38'40"	Report	Cléber Souza 23'15" (o.g.); Caio Ruiz 28'06"; Tursagulov 39'48"

Palau Son Moix, Palma de Mallorca
Referee: Nicola Manzione (Italy),
Dominykas Norkus (Lithuania)

==== Group 4 ====
Pos	Team	Pld	W	D	L	GF	GA	GD	Pts	Qualification
1	(Portugal) Benfica	3	2	1	0	22	3	+19	7 (Note: Tied on head-to-head points, goal difference, and goals scored. Total goal difference: Benfica +19, Étoile Lavalloise +10.)	Advance to elite round
2	(France) Étoile Lavalloise	3	2	1	0	16	6	+10	7	Advance to elite round
3	(Slovenia) FK Dobovec (H)	3	0	1	2	4	15	−11	1 (Note: Tied on head-to-head points, goal difference, and goals scored. Total goal difference: FK Dobovec -11, United Galați -18.)	Advance to elite round
4	(Romania) United Galați	3	0	1	2	7	25	−18	1	

Source: UEFA
Rules for classification: Tiebreakers
(H) Hosts
Notes:
25 October 2023
12:30

Benfica (Portugal)	2–2	(France) Étoile Lavalloise
Vinícius Rocha 32'12"; Afonso Jesus 35'39"	Report	Lutin 19'16"; Mouhoudine 26'16"

Podčetrtek Sports Hall, Podčetrtek
Referee: Grigori Ošomkov (Estonia),
Ingus Puriņš (Latvia)
25 October 2023
15:00

United Galați (Romania)	3–3	(Slovenia) FK Dobovec
Dudau 25'49"; Sasse 32'38"; Matei 35'14"	Report	Čeh 10'26"; Duščak 19'26", 36'15"

Podčetrtek Sports Hall, Podčetrtek
Referee: Yiangos Yiangou (Cyprus),
Ozan Soykan (Turkey)

26 October 2023
12:30

United Galați (Romania)	0–12	(Portugal) Benfica
	Report	Jacaré 1'42"; Arthur 2'11", 3'08", 11'45", 33'15"; Higor de Souza 5'23"; Chishkala 12'09"; Diego Nunes 14'28"; C. Monteiro 29'18"; Lúcio Rocha 36'03"; Vinícius Rocha 38'27", 38'59"

Podčetrtek Sports Hall, Podčetrtek
Referee: Ozan Soykan (Turkey),
Grigori Ošomkov (Estonia)
26 October 2023
15:00

FK Dobovec (Slovenia)	0–4	(France) Étoile Lavalloise
	Report	Peček 9'20" (o.g.); Guirio 19'50"; Mouhoudine 24'03", 39'15"

Podčetrtek Sports Hall, Podčetrtek
Referee: Ingus Puriņš (Latvia),
Yiangos Yiangou (Cyprus)

28 October 2023
12:30

Étoile Lavalloise (France)	10–4	(Romania) United Galați
B. Bakkali 3'51", 17'24"; Diego Napoles 11'27"; Guirio 16'07", 37'52"; A. Mohammed 28'42", 35'21"; Kaíque Souza 29'28"; El Mesrar 30'15"; Lutin 37'09"	Report	Craciun 5'54"; D. Araujo 15'51" (pen.); Dudau 28'31"; Cojocaru 36'46"

Podčetrtek Sports Hall, Podčetrtek
Referee: Grigori Ošomkov (Estonia),
Yiangos Yiangou (Cyprus)
28 October 2023
15:00

FK Dobovec (Slovenia)	1–8	(Portugal) Benfica
Duščak 6'30"	Report	Gonçalo Sobral 0'22"; Arthur 1'29", 31'52", 34'05"; Jacaré 2'05", 2'35"; Lúcio Rocha 35'59"; Afonso Jesus 38'39"

Podčetrtek Sports Hall, Podčetrtek
Referee: Ingus Puriņš (Latvia),
Ozan Soykan (Turkey)

=== Path B ===
==== Group 5 ====
Pos	Team	Pld	W	D	L	GF	GA	GD	Pts	Qualification
1	(Poland) KSC Lubawa	3	2	1	0	23	13	+10	7	Advance to elite round
2	(Croatia) Futsal Dinamo (H)	3	2	0	1	18	10	+8	6	
3	(Montenegro) KMF Titograd	3	1	1	1	11	9	+2	4	
4	(Sweden) Örebro SK	3	0	0	3	5	25	−20	0	

Source: UEFA
Rules for classification: Tiebreakers
(H) Hosts
24 October 2023
11:00

KMF Titograd (Montenegro)	4–4	(Poland) KSC Lubawa
Cimbaljević 14'35", 34'32"; Obradović 23'57"; Marković 35'09" (pen.)	Report	López 15'06"; Sendlewski 22'28"; Kriezel 26'24"; Obradović 39'26" (o.g.)

Dražen Petrović Basketball Hall, Zagreb
Referee: David Urdánoz (Spain),
Stephen Vella (Malta)
24 October 2023
14:00

Örebro SK (Sweden)	1–8	(Croatia) Futsal Dinamo
Fawaz 24'40"	Report	Konsuo 2'13"; Novak 4'39", 33'05"; Čekol 8'56"; Mužar 12'08"; Pavlić 20'53"; Postružin 22'12", 31'26"

Dražen Petrović Basketball Hall, Zagreb
Referee: Stefan Vrijens (Belgium),
Telmen Undrakh (Norway)

25 October 2023
11:00

Örebro SK (Sweden)	2–7	(Montenegro) KMF Titograd
Erik 16'29"; Gantzhorn 38'14"	Report	Vuletić 1'30", 1'59", 23'40"; Marković 8'28"; Adžić 10'30"; Cimbaljević 27'41"; Bulatović 39'11"

Dražen Petrović Basketball Hall, Zagreb
Referee: Telmen Undrakh (Norway),
David Urdánoz (Spain)
25 October 2023
14:00

Futsal Dinamo (Croatia)	7–9	(Poland) KSC Lubawa
Postružin 12'41" (pen.), 15'20" (pen.), 28'40" (pen.); Perić 19'02"; Čekol 34'34"; Novak 35'57", 36'20"	Report	Pedrinho 0'30"; Raszkowski 0'49", 0'59"; Claudinho 1'26", 5'44"; Kriezel 10'55"; A. Lemos 16'38"; Jankowski 19'11"; Kaniewski 38'24"

Dražen Petrović Basketball Hall, Zagreb
Referee: Stephen Vella (Malta),
Stefan Vrijens (Belgium)

27 October 2023
11:00

KSC Lubawa (Poland)	10–2	(Sweden) Örebro SK
Claudinho 2'26"; Lisowski 8'02", 22'04"; Raszkowski 15'53", 21'17", 25'39"; Pedrinho 21'44", 32'21"; Everton 31'00"; Jankowski 34'14"	Report	Erik 10'24"; Gantzhorn 29'36"

Dražen Petrović Basketball Hall, Zagreb
Referee: Telmen Undrakh (Norway),
Stephen Vella (Malta)
27 October 2023
14:00

Futsal Dinamo (Croatia)	3–0	(Montenegro) KMF Titograd
Gudasic 6'27"; Čekol 29'47", 34'16"	Report

Dražen Petrović Basketball Hall, Zagreb
Referee: David Urdánoz (Spain),
Stefan Vrijens (Belgium)

==== Group 6 ====
Pos	Team	Pld	W	D	L	GF	GA	GD	Pts	Qualification
1	(Latvia) Riga Futsal Club	3	3	0	0	25	6	+19	9	Advance to elite round
2	(Czech Republic) SK Plzeň (H)	3	1	1	1	11	16	−5	4	
3	(Denmark) Futsal Gentofte	3	1	0	2	11	17	−6	3	
4	(Bosnia and Herzegovina) Radnik Bijeljina	3	0	1	2	12	20	−8	1	

Source: UEFA
Rules for classification: Tiebreakers
(H) Hosts
25 October 2023
11:00

Futsal Gentofte (Denmark)	1–9	(Latvia) Riga Futsal Club
Hansen 10'53"	Report	Kuzmin 11'39"; Ricardinho 18'42", 31'54"; Serginho 18'57"; Strazdiņš 20'41", 22'21"; Thalles Henrique 23'18", 38'34"; Mickēvičs 30'44"

TJ Lokomotiva Plzeň, Plzeň
Attendance: 152
Referee: Eduardo Fernandes (Portugal),
Marjan Mladenovski (North Macedonia)
25 October 2023
14:00

Radnik Bijeljina (Bosnia and Herzegovina)	5–5	(Czech Republic) SK Plzeň
Pavlović 1'01", 32'16"; Pavić 22'23"; Arnautović 26'18"; Marinković 27'11"	Report	Rick 18'24"; Rešetár 21'54", 34'32"; Holý 27'33"; Vnuk 27'53"

TJ Lokomotiva Plzeň, Plzeň
Attendance: 650
Referee: Denys Kutsyi (Ukraine),
Filipe Santos (Portugal)

26 October 2023
11:00

Radnik Bijeljina (Bosnia and Herzegovina)	3–6	(Denmark) Futsal Gentofte
Odžaklić 5'33"; Miljković 6'25"; Ruzicić 27'52" (pen.)	Report	Johansson 18'41"; Rasmussen 20'29", 25'26", 33'33"; Hansen 34'29"; Andersen 36'56"

TJ Lokomotiva Plzeň, Plzeň
Attendance: 323
Referee: Filipe Santos (Portugal),
Eduardo Fernandes (Portugal)
26 October 2023
14:00

SK Plzeň (Czech Republic)	1–7	(Latvia) Riga Futsal Club
Rešetár 16'58"	Report	Serginho 5'46"; Vargas 13'48"; Ricardinho 28'19"; Thalles Henrique 31'16", 38'40"; Kuzmin 36'12"; Vaporaki 38'14"

TJ Lokomotiva Plzeň, Plzeň
Attendance: 872
Referee: Marjan Mladenovski (North Macedonia), Denys Kutsyi (Ukraine)

28 October 2023
11:00

Riga Futsal Club (Latvia)	9–4	(Bosnia and Herzegovina) Radnik Bijeljina
Vaporaki 3'18"; Kuzmin 6'36", 26'49" (pen.); Thalles Henrique 9'41", 22'03", 36'39"; Ricardinho 22'38"; Strazdiņš 29'13"; Kozlovskis 38'51"	Report	Ruzicić 2'31" (pen.), 29'20" (pen.); Marinković 6'25"; Pavlović 39'48"

TJ Lokomotiva Plzeň, Plzeň
Referee: Denys Kutsyi (Ukraine),
Filipe Santos (Portugal)
28 October 2023
14:00

SK Plzeň (Czech Republic)	5–4	(Denmark) Futsal Gentofte
Holý 0'40", 26'47"; Knobloch 13'48"; El-Ouaz 34'23" (o.g.); Vitinho 39'48"	Report	El-Ouaz 11'35"; Veis 24'51"; Jørgensen 28'36", 32'14"

TJ Lokomotiva Plzeň, Plzeň
Attendance: 350
Referee: Eduardo Fernandes (Portugal),
Marjan Mladenovski (North Macedonia)

==== Group 7 ====
Pos	Team	Pld	W	D	L	GF	GA	GD	Pts	Qualification
1	(Kosovo) Prishtina 01	3	2	1	0	14	2	+12	7	Advance to elite round
2	(Lithuania) Kauno Žalgiris (H)	3	1	2	0	11	4	+7	5	
3	(Finland) Kampuksen Dynamo	3	1	1	1	8	9	−1	4	
4	(Cyprus) AEL Futsal	3	0	0	3	7	25	−18	0	

Source: UEFA
Rules for classification: Tiebreakers
(H) Hosts
25 October 2023
10:00

Kampuksen Dynamo (Finland)	0–6	(Kosovo) Prishtina 01
	Report	Selmanaj 0'47"; Mazreku 12'41", 26'09"; Savolainen 22'07" (o.g.); Krasniqi 24'36"; Alaj 30'51"

Kaunas Sports Hall, Kaunas
Referee: Lars Van Leeuwen (Netherlands),
Rastislav Behancin (Slovakia)
25 October 2023
13:00

AEL Futsal (Cyprus)	3–10	(Lithuania) Kauno Žalgiris
Batata 22'17", 27'01", 37'47" (pen.)	Report	Zagurskas 6'03"; Vitinho 16'32", 36'42"; Beleu 18'40"; Vini Carvalho 21'21"; Voskunovič 24'29", 30'25"; Sendžikas 26'32", 32'36"; Kassula 27'32"

Kaunas Sports Hall, Kaunas
Referee: David Schaerli (Switzerland),
Trayan Enchev (Bulgaria)

26 October 2023
10:00

AEL Futsal (Cyprus)	2–7	(Finland) Kampuksen Dynamo
Fabrício Lima 0'52"; Batata 27'47" (pen.)	Report	Koskela 4'09"; Filppu 6'46"; Sylla 15'02"; Newton Jr. 25'23", 38'22"; David Parente 30'02"; Laitinen 38'48"

Kaunas Sports Hall, Kaunas
Referee: Trayan Enchev (Bulgaria),
Lars Van Leeuwen (Netherlands)
26 October 2023
13:00

Kauno Žalgiris (Lithuania)	0–0	(Kosovo) Prishtina 01
	Report

Kaunas Sports Hall, Kaunas
Referee: Rastislav Behancin (Slovakia),
David Schaerli (Switzerland)

28 October 2023
10:00

Prishtina 01 (Kosovo)	8–2	(Cyprus) AEL Futsal
Maxharraj 0'26"; Qerimi 0'45"; Mazreku 3'39"; Limani 7'41", 22'18"; Selmanaj 9'44", 36'18" (pen.); Kryeziu 25'15"	Report	Skarparis 32'54"; Batata 37'58" (pen.)

Kaunas Sports Hall, Kaunas
Referee: Trayan Enchev (Bulgaria),
Rastislav Behancin (Slovakia)
28 October 2023
13:00

Kauno Žalgiris (Lithuania)	1–1	(Finland) Kampuksen Dynamo
Vitinho 22'08"	Report	Newton Jr. 37'13"

Kaunas Sports Hall, Kaunas
Referee: Lars Van Leeuwen (Netherlands),
David Schaerli (Switzerland)

==== Group 8 ====
Pos	Team	Pld	W	D	L	GF	GA	GD	Pts	Qualification
1	(Italy) Feldi Eboli (H)	3	3	0	0	7	3	+4	9	Advance to elite round
2	(Belarus) Stalitsa Minsk	3	2	0	1	8	5	+3	6	
3	(Slovakia) MIMEL Lučenec	3	1	0	2	6	5	+1	3	
4	(Greece) Doukas	3	0	0	3	6	14	−8	0	

Source: UEFA
Rules for classification: Tiebreakers
(H) Hosts
25 October 2023
12:30

Stalitsa Minsk (Belarus)	5–2	(Greece) Doukas
Osipov 1'29", 13'26"; Yakubov 2'28"; Scherbich 10'37"; Edimar 38'41"	Report	Neto Lira 8'52"; Edimar 16'49" (o.g.)

PalaSele, Eboli
Referee: Victor Chaix (France),
Viktor Bugenko (Moldova)
25 October 2023
15:30

MIMEL Lučenec (Slovakia)	0–1	(Italy) Feldi Eboli
	Report	Calderolli 6'23"

PalaSele, Eboli
Referee: Petar Radojcic (Serbia),
Martin Køster (Denmark)

26 October 2023
12:30

MIMEL Lučenec (Slovakia)	1–3	(Belarus) Stalitsa Minsk
Greško 38'08"	Report	Lavor 5'34"; Umpirovich 23'54"; Islamov 39'11"

PalaSele, Eboli
Referee: Martin Køster (Denmark),
Victor Chaix (France)
26 October 2023
15:45

Feldi Eboli (Italy)	4–3	(Greece) Doukas
Marinović 2'46"; Venâncio 7'17"; Calderolli 15'32"; Selucio 18'10"	Report	Karydas 4'32"; Neto Lira 8'31"; Pett 23'07"

PalaSele, Eboli
Referee: Viktor Bugenko (Moldova),
Petar Radojcic (Serbia)

28 October 2023
12:30

Doukas (Greece)	1–5	(Slovakia) MIMEL Lučenec
Neto Lira 33'34"	Report	Čeřovský 4'25", 18'14"; Marík 5'07"; Washington Luiz 29'55"; Franklin Neto 34'35"

PalaSele, Eboli
Referee: Viktor Bugenko (Moldova),
Martin Køster (Denmark)
28 October 2023
15:45

Feldi Eboli (Italy)	2–0	(Belarus) Stalitsa Minsk
Marinović 27'09"; Venâncio 39'09" (pen.)	Report

PalaSele, Eboli
Referee: Victor Chaix (France),
Petar Radojcic (Serbia)

== Elite round ==
The draw for the elite round was held on 2 November 2023, 14:15 CET. The elite round was played from 29 November to 3 December 2023.

Times are CET, as listed by UEFA (local times, if different, are in parentheses).

=== Seeding ===
A total of 16 teams played in the elite round. Seeding of teams was based on their results in the previous round:

- Seeding position 1: main round path A group winners.
- Seeding position 2: main round path A runners-up.
- Seeding positions 3 and 4 (drawn from the same pot): main round path A third-placed teams and path B group winners.

Four teams were pre-selected as hosts and were first drawn from a separate pot to their corresponding seeding position. Winners and runners-up from the same main round path A group could not be drawn into the same group.

Seeding position 1	Seeding position 2	Seeding positions 3 and 4	
(Portugal) Sporting CP (H); (Spain) FC Barcelona; (Spain) Palma Futsal (H); (Portugal) Benfica	(Ukraine) HIT Kyiv; (Belgium) Anderlecht; (Kazakhstan) Kairat; (France) Étoile Lavalloise	(Croatia) Olmissum; (Serbia) KMF Loznica-Grad; (Hungary) Haladás; (Slovenia) Dobovec	(Poland) KSC Lubawa; (Latvia) Riga Futsal Club (H); (Kosovo) Prishtina 01 (H); (Italy) Feldi Eboli

Notes

- H – Mini-tournament hosts

=== Group A ===
Pos	Team	Pld	W	D	L	GF	GA	GD	Pts	Qualification
1	(Spain) FC Barcelona	3	2	1	0	12	4	+8	7	Advance to final tournament
2	(Latvia) Riga Futsal Club (H)	3	2	0	1	12	11	+1	6	
3	(France) Étoile Lavalloise	3	1	0	2	8	12	−4	3	
4	(Italy) Feldi Eboli	3	0	1	2	6	11	−5	1	

Source: UEFA
Rules for classification: Tiebreakers
(H) Hosts
29 November 2023
15:00

FC Barcelona (Spain)	2–2	(Italy) Feldi Eboli
Catela 19'10" (pen.); Touré 34'18"	Report	Calderolli 11'32", 39'49"

Zemgale Olympic Center, Jelgava
Attendance: 369
Referee: Vedran Babić (Croatia),
Vlad Nicolae Ciobanu (Romania)
29 November 2023
18:00

Étoile Lavalloise (France)	4–5	(Latvia) Riga Futsal Club
El Mesrar 1'16", 39'09"; A. Mohammed 9'54", 16'34"	Report	Kuzmin 12'36"; Serginho 15'57", 39'23"; Thalles Henrique 19'53" (pen.), 39'54"

Zemgale Olympic Center, Jelgava
Attendance: 581
Referee: Marc Birkett (England),
Ademir Avdic (Sweden)

30 November 2023
15:00

Étoile Lavalloise (France)	0–7	(Spain) FC Barcelona
	Report	Pito 5'15", 20'33", 30'10"; Adolfo 12'54", 32'42", 33'29"; Matheus Rodrigues 38'14"

Zemgale Olympic Center, Jelgava
Attendance: 292
Referee: Ademir Avdic (Sweden),
Vedran Babić (Croatia)
30 November 2023
18:00

Riga Futsal Club (Latvia)	5–4	(Italy) Feldi Eboli
Thalles Henrique 13'25", 23'56" (pen.); Rimkus 14'31"; Vargas 30'16"; Ricardinho 39'29"	Report	Dalcin 4'50"; Venâncio 12'25", 25'35"; Igor Carioca 17'11" (pen.)

Zemgale Olympic Center, Jelgava
Attendance: 677
Referee: Vlad Nicolae Ciobanu (Romania),
Marc Birkett (England)

2 December 2023
13:00

Feldi Eboli (Italy)	0–4	(France) Étoile Lavalloise
	Report	Kaíque Souza 17'16"; A. Mohammed 24'00"; Mouhoudine 37'40"; B. Bakkali 39'58"

Zemgale Olympic Center, Jelgava
Attendance: 683
Referee: Ademir Avdic (Sweden),
Vlad Nicolae Ciobanu (Romania)
2 December 2023
16:00

Riga Futsal Club (Latvia)	2–3	(Spain) FC Barcelona
André Coelho 9'59" (o.g.); Thalles Henrique 35'05"	Report	Adolfo 5'44"; Catela 24'14"; Touré 29'54"

Zemgale Olympic Center, Jelgava
Attendance: 1,417
Referee: Marc Birkett (England),
Vedran Babić (Croatia)

=== Group B ===
Pos	Team	Pld	W	D	L	GF	GA	GD	Pts	Qualification
1	(Portugal) Benfica	3	3	0	0	17	6	+11	9	Advance to final tournament
2	(Kazakhstan) Kairat	3	2	0	1	20	5	+15	6	
3	(Slovenia) Dobovec	3	0	1	2	6	14	−8	1	
4	(Kosovo) Prishtina 01 (H)	3	0	1	2	6	24	−18	1	

Source: UEFA
Rules for classification: Tiebreakers
(H) Hosts
29 November 2023
17:00

Benfica (Portugal)	4–3	(Slovenia) Dobovec
Diego Nunes 0'13"; Afonso Jesus 11'27"; Gonçalo Sobral 25'39"; Jacaré 39'52"	Report	Pasariček 22'48"; Duščak 23'43"; Čeh 32'34"

Palace of Youth and Sports, Pristina
Attendance: 348
Referee: Cédric Pelissier (France),
Bogdan Hanceariuc (Romania)
29 November 2023
20:00

Kairat (Kazakhstan)	11–2	(Kosovo) Prishtina 01
Pedro Ribeiro 6'29", 17'47"; Alisson Lima 6'51"; Diego Fávero 8'52", 16'13"; Dener 11'02", 26'38"; Edson Gomes 12'15"; Douglas Júnior 28'07"; Alex Viana 28'34"; Caio Ruiz 29'49"	Report	Alex Viana 4'14" (o.g.); Maxharraj 23'52"

Palace of Youth and Sports, Pristina
Attendance: 1,624
Referee: Daniel Matkovic (Switzerland),
Ondřej Černý (Czech Republic)

30 November 2023
17:00

Kairat (Kazakhstan)	2–3	(Portugal) Benfica
Tursagulov 7'13"; Dener 35'53"	Report	Afonso Jesus 3'36"; Diego Nunes 4'02"; Lúcio Rocha 10'00"

Palace of Youth and Sports, Pristina
Attendance: 889
Referee: Ondřej Černý (Czech Republic),
Cédric Pelissier (France)
30 November 2023
20:00

Prishtina 01 (Kosovo)	3–3	(Slovenia) Dobovec
Maxharraj 7'08", 38'52"; Pihler 27'06" (o.g.)	Report	Pasariček 4'17"; Knežević 5'11"; Cesarec 20'30"

Palace of Youth and Sports, Pristina
Attendance: 920
Referee: Bogdan Hanceariuc (Romania),
Daniel Matkovic (Switzerland)

2 December 2023
17:00

Dobovec (Slovenia)	0–7	(Kazakhstan) Kairat
	Report	Dasaiev 2'58" (o.g.); Caio Ruiz 14'16"; Douglas Júnior 18'56"; Alex Viana 21'49", 39'09"; Orazov 22'23"; Akbalikov 27'25"

Palace of Youth and Sports, Pristina
Attendance: 288
Referee: Cédric Pelissier (France),
Daniel Matkovic (Switzerland)
2 December 2023
20:00

Prishtina 01 (Kosovo)	1–10	(Portugal) Benfica
Maxharraj 21'28"	Report	Afonso Jesus 6'10", 13'05"; Diego Nunes 9'34", 32'25"; Jacaré 22'06"; S. Ferreira 24'59", 26'04"; Bruno Cintra 25'30"; Higor de Souza 37'38"; Bruno Coelho 39'55"

Palace of Youth and Sports, Pristina
Attendance: 1,026
Referee: Ondřej Černý (Czech Republic),
Bogdan Hanceariuc (Romania)

=== Group C ===
Pos	Team	Pld	W	D	L	GF	GA	GD	Pts	Qualification
1	(Portugal) Sporting CP (H)	3	3	0	0	20	4	+16	9	Advance to final tournament
2	(Belgium) Anderlecht	3	2	0	1	14	7	+7	6	
3	(Serbia) KMF Loznica-Grad	3	1	0	2	5	19	−14	3	
4	(Hungary) Haladás	3	0	0	3	6	15	−9	0	

Source: UEFA
Rules for classification: Tiebreakers
(H) Hosts
30 November 2023
17:00

Anderlecht (Belgium)	5–2	(Hungary) Haladás
Edu 14'25"; Tomić 18'06"; A. Santos 19'54" (o.g.); Marcênio 27'50"; Gréllo 38'42"	Report	Rangel 1'26" (o.g.); Henrique Souza 13'20"

Pavilhão João Rocha, Lisbon
Attendance: 138
Referee: Peter Nurse (England),
Kamil Çetin (Turkey)
30 November 2023
21:30

KMF Loznica-Grad (Serbia)	1–9	(Portugal) Sporting CP
Rosić 27'32"	Report	Zicky Té 1'13", 33'16"; Merlim 3'50"; Pauleta 16'13"; Diogo Santos 16'47"; Tomás Paçó 21'37"; Dandan 24'00" (o.g.); Neves 37'00", 38'53"

Pavilhão João Rocha, Lisbon
Attendance: 1,531
Referee: Alejandro Martínez (Spain),
Damian Grabowski (Poland)

1 December 2023
17:00

KMF Loznica-Grad (Serbia)	1–8	(Belgium) Anderlecht
Rosić 8'40"	Report	Rangel 5'35"; Edu 9'09", 21'48"; Roncáglio 9'40"; Tomić 18'22", 23'21"; Saura 28'44"; Vilela 33'58"

Pavilhão João Rocha, Lisbon
Attendance: 202
Referee: Damian Grabowski (Poland),
Peter Nurse (England)
1 December 2023
21:30

Sporting CP (Portugal)	7–2	(Hungary) Haladás
Merlim 3'29", 22'59", 33'48"; Neves 8'32" (pen.), 36'31"; Taynan 12'45"; Zicky Té 15'15"	Report	Merlim 8'34" (o.g.); Vas 30'37"

Pavilhão João Rocha, Lisbon
Referee: Kamil Çetin (Turkey),
Alejandro Martínez (Spain)

3 December 2023
16:00

Haladás (Hungary)	2–3	(Serbia) KMF Loznica-Grad
Dróth 19'58"; Luiggi Baptista 28'58"	Report	Rosić 5'54", 12'35"; Dudu 14'28"

Pavilhão João Rocha, Lisbon
Attendance: 188
Referee: Kamil Çetin (Turkey),
Peter Nurse (England)
3 December 2023
19:30

Sporting CP (Portugal)	4–1	(Belgium) Anderlecht
Diogo Santos 8'34"; Pany Varela 14'10"; Zicky Té 22'09"; Bernardo Paço 31'15"	Report	Gréllo 17'46"

Pavilhão João Rocha, Lisbon
Attendance: 2,473
Referee: Alejandro Martínez (Spain),
Damian Grabowski (Poland)

=== Group D ===
Pos	Team	Pld	W	D	L	GF	GA	GD	Pts	Qualification
1	(Spain) Palma Futsal (H)	3	2	1	0	10	6	+4	7	Advance to final tournament
2	(Poland) KSC Lubawa	3	2	0	1	14	10	+4	6	
3	(Ukraine) HIT Kyiv	3	1	1	1	11	11	0	4	
4	(Croatia) Olmissum	3	0	0	3	8	16	−8	0	

Source: UEFA
Rules for classification: Tiebreakers
(H) Hosts
29 November 2023
16:00

HIT Kyiv (Ukraine)	5–6	(Poland) KSC Lubawa
Zhuk 6'46"; Abakshyn 16'19", 32'28"; Siryi 20'22"; Cherniavskyi 38'48"	Report	Pedrinho 10'33", 37'47"; Raszkowski 36'29"; Kaniewski 36'40", 39'12"; Claudinho 37'18"

Palau Son Moix, Palma de Mallorca
Attendance: 287
Referee: Gábor Kovács (Hungary),
Dejan Veselič (Slovenia)
29 November 2023
19:00

Olmissum (Croatia)	3–5	(Spain) Palma Futsal
Kustura 9'03"; Sekulić 10'26"; Bukovec 30'56"	Report	Rivillos 11'47"; Oladghobad 20'39", 28'11"; Gordillo 22'14", 34'19"

Palau Son Moix, Palma de Mallorca
Attendance: 2,821
Referee: Miguel Castilho (Portugal),
David Grøndal Nissen (Denmark)

30 November 2023
16:00

Olmissum (Croatia)	3–4	(Ukraine) HIT Kyiv
Sekulić 18'32", 26'09"; Kustura 35'26"	Report	Abakshyn 24'50", 29'13"; Zhuk 28'07"; Ponochovnyi 39'58"

Palau Son Moix, Palma de Mallorca
Attendance: 143
Referee: David Grøndal Nissen (Denmark),
Gábor Kovács (Hungary)
30 November 2023
19:00

Palma Futsal (Spain)	3–1	(Poland) KSC Lubawa
M. dos Santos 12'57"; Bruno Gomes 33'31"; Oladghobad 36'17"	Report	Raszkowski 16'20"

Palau Son Moix, Palma de Mallorca
Attendance: 2,251
Referee: Dejan Veselič (Slovenia),
Miguel Castilho (Portugal)

2 December 2023
16:00

KSC Lubawa (Poland)	7–2	(Croatia) Olmissum
Kriezel 24'02", 36'28"; Jankowski 27'06"; A. Lemos 29'22"; Claudinho 33'36"; Kaniewski 36'50"; Pedrinho 38'07"	Report	Sekulić 17'33"; Kustura 20'29"

Palau Son Moix, Palma de Mallorca
Attendance: 186
Referee: David Grøndal Nissen (Denmark),
Dejan Veselič (Slovenia)
2 December 2023
19:00

HIT Kyiv (Ukraine)	2–2	(Spain) Palma Futsal
Abakshyn 13'34"; Ponochovnyi 37'38"	Report	Gordillo 23'22"; Oladghobad 25'22"

Palau Son Moix, Palma de Mallorca
Attendance: 3,997
Referee: Gábor Kovács (Hungary),
Miguel Castilho (Portugal)

== Final tournament ==
Semi-finals
3 May
(Portugal) Benfica	4 (3)
(Spain) Palma Futsal	4 (4)
3 May
(Spain) FC Barcelona	5
(Portugal) Sporting CP	4

Final
5 May
(Spain) Palma Futsal	5
(Spain) FC Barcelona	1
Third place
5 May
(Portugal) Benfica	6
(Portugal) Sporting CP	3

=== Semi-finals ===
3 May 2024
15:00

Benfica (Portugal)	4–4 (a.e.t.)	(Spain) Palma Futsal
Lúcio Rocha 6'16", 21'24", 36'32"; Jacaré 10'59"	Report	Gordillo 8'03", 38'38"; Muller 33'46"; M. dos Santos 37'30"
Penalties
Arthur (penalty scored); Bruno Coelho (penalty scored); Afonso Jesus (penalty scored); Diego Nunes (penalty missed); Vinícius Rocha (penalty missed)	3–4	Vilian (penalty scored); Rômulo (penalty scored); Neguinho (penalty scored); Gordillo (penalty scored); M. dos Santos (penalty missed)

Demirchyan Arena, Yerevan
Referee: Ondřej Černý (Czech Republic),
Denys Kutsyi (Ukraine)
3 May 2024
18:00

FC Barcelona (Spain)	5–4	(Portugal) Sporting CP
Rafa Félix 8'20" (o.g.); Adolfo 8'48"; A. Pérez 18'21"; Catela 21'28"; Matheus Rodrigues 31'10"	Report	Tomás Paçó 0'54"; Zicky Té 16'32"; Neves 17'22"; Tatinho 23'58"

Demirchyan Arena, Yerevan
Referee: Dejan Veselič (Slovenia),
Damian Grabowski (Poland)

=== Third place match ===
5 May 2024
15:00

Sporting CP (Portugal)	3–6	(Portugal) Benfica
Rafagnin 19'53"; Taynan 21'35"; Zicky Té 38'08"	Report	Arthur 8'55"; Higor de Souza 10'27", 21'21", 21'58"; Lúcio Rocha 37'57", 39'34"

Demirchyan Arena, Yerevan
Referee: Dominykas Norkus (Lithuania),
Peter Nurse (England)

=== Final ===
5 May 2024
18:00

FC Barcelona (Spain)	1–5	(Spain) Palma Futsal
Adolfo 14'59"	Report	Rômulo 18'15"; Vilian 19'53"; Neguinho 33'49", 39'52"; Chaguinha 39'39"

Demirchyan Arena, Yerevan
Referee: Nikola Jelić (Croatia),
Nicola Manzione (Italy)

UEFA Futsal Champions League
2023–24 Winners

Palma Futsal
2nd Title

== Statistics ==
- Preliminary round: There were 308 goals scored in 45 matches, for an average of 6.84 goals per match.
- Main round: There were 325 goals scored in 48 matches, for an average of 6.77 goals per match.
- Elite round: There were 175 goals scored in 24 matches, for an average of 7.29 goals per match.
- Final tournament: There were 32 goals scored in 4 matches, for an average of 8 goals per match.

=== Top goalscorers ===
Players in **bold** are still in the competition

Rank	Player	Team	Goals
1	(Brazil) Thalles Henrique	(Latvia) Riga Futsal Club	15
2	(Bosnia and Herzegovina) Mirko Marinković	(Bosnia and Herzegovina) Radnik Bijeljina	14
3	(Brazil) Batata Schlemper	(Cyprus) AEL Futsal	12
4	(Portugal) Ricardinho	(Latvia) Riga Futsal Club	11
5	(Portugal) Zicky Té	(Portugal) Sporting CP	10
6	(Spain) Adolfo Fernández	(Spain) FC Barcelona	9
6	(Kosovo) Drilon Maxharraj	(Kosovo) Prishtina 01	9
6	(Poland) Jakub Raszkowski	(Poland) KSC Lubawa	9

=== Top assists ===
Players in **bold** are still in the competition

Rank	Player	Team	Assists
1	(Italy) Alex Merlim	(Portugal) Sporting CP	10
1	(Brazil) Pedrinho	(Poland) KSC Lubawa	10
3	(Brazil) Thalles Henrique	(Latvia) Riga Futsal Club	8
4	(Portugal) Bruno Coelho	(Portugal) Benfica	7
5	(Spain) Juanjo Catela	(Spain) FC Barcelona	6
6	(Georgia (country)) **Chaguinha**	(Spain) Palma Futsal	5
6	(Argentina) Dylan Vargas	(Latvia) Riga Futsal Club	5
6	(Poland) Tomasz Kriezel	(Poland) KSC Lubawa	5
