= 2024 FIFA Futsal World Cup squads =

List of the national futsal squads that take part in the 2024 FIFA Futsal World Cup

The 2024 FIFA Futsal World Cup was an international futsal tournament held in Uzbekistan from 14 September to 6 October 2024. The 24 national teams involved in the tournament were required by FIFA to register a squad of 14 players, including at least two goalkeepers.

This article lists the national futsal squads that take part in the tournament. The age listed for each player is as of 14 September 2024, the first day of the tournament, and the names of the players shown are that of the FIFA Display Names listed on the official squad document issued by FIFA.

== Group A ==
=== Uzbekistan ===
The final squad was announced on 10 September 2024.

Head coach: (Spain) José Venancio López

No.	Pos.	Player	Date of birth (age)	Club
1	GK	Sunnatjon Anvarov	5 September 1998 (aged 26)	(Uzbekistan Football Association) Bunyodkor MFK
2	DF	Fazliddin Botirov	12 November 2004 (aged 19)	(Uzbekistan Football Association) FK AGMK
3	DF	Mashrab Adilov	15 August 1994 (aged 30)	(Uzbekistan Football Association) BMB Futsal
4	MF	Ikhtiyor Ropiev	19 September 1993 (aged 30)	(Uzbekistan Football Association) Oil Star Futsal
5	FW	Muzaffar Akhadjonov	8 November 1997 (aged 26)	(Uzbekistan Football Association) BMB Futsal
6	DF	Ilkhomjon Khamroev (captain)	25 September 1997 (aged 26)	(Uzbekistan Football Association) Oil Star Futsal
7	MF	Anaskhon Rakhmatov	20 June 1994 (aged 30)	(Uzbekistan Football Association) Oil Star Futsal
8	MF	Khusniddin Nishonov	19 May 1998 (aged 26)	(Uzbekistan Football Association) Oil Star Futsal
9	FW	Elbek Tulkinov	24 December 2000 (aged 23)	(Uzbekistan Football Association) FK AGMK
10	FW	Akbar Usmonov	9 March 1997 (aged 27)	(Uzbekistan Football Association) BMB Futsal
11	FW	Abror Akhmetzyanov	22 May 2004 (aged 20)	(Uzbekistan Football Association) FK AGMK
12	GK	Abbos Elmurodov	4 September 1998 (aged 26)	(Uzbekistan Football Association) BMB Futsal
13	DF	Mekhroj Khudoyberdiev	14 May 1998 (aged 26)	(Uzbekistan Football Association) Dinamo Samarqand
14	MF	Samariddin Berkinov	18 July 2000 (aged 24)	(Uzbekistan Football Association) Dinamo Samarqand

=== Netherlands ===
The final squad was announced on 31 August 2024. Saber Ben Khalou had to withdrawn from the squad due to an injury and was replaced by Steije Kee.

Head coach: (Spain) Miguel Andrés Moreno

No.	Pos.	Player	Date of birth (age)	Club
1	GK	Manuel Kuijk	13 October 1994 (aged 29)	(Royal Dutch Football Association) Tigers Roermond
2	DF	Jordy Cretier	16 July 1994 (aged 30)	(Royal Dutch Football Association) VNS United
3	DF	Steije Kee	5 March 2003 (aged 21)	(Royal Dutch Football Association) FC Marlène
4	DF	Tevfik Ceyar	2 May 1990 (aged 34)	(Royal Dutch Football Association) FC Eindhoven
5	FW	Ayoub Boukhari	6 May 1997 (aged 27)	(Royal Belgian Football Association) FT Borgerhout
6	MF	Karim Mossaoui	27 February 1988 (aged 36)	(Royal Dutch Football Association) Tigers Roermond
7	FW	Jordany Martinus (captain)	10 July 1990 (aged 34)	(Royal Dutch Football Association) FC Eindhoven
8	DF	Abdessamad Attahiri	19 December 1994 (aged 29)	(Royal Dutch Football Association) VNS United
9	FW	Said Bouzambou	9 February 1990 (aged 34)	(Royal Dutch Football Association) FC Eindhoven
10	FW	Ismaïl Ouaddouh	14 November 1994 (aged 29)	(Royal Dutch Football Association) BE '79
11	MF	Lahcen Bouyouzan	17 April 1993 (aged 31)	(Royal Dutch Football Association) Tigers Roermond
12	GK	Mika Spigt	10 September 2005 (aged 19)	(Royal Dutch Football Association) FC Marlène
13	MF	Ishak Belhaj	20 August 1993 (aged 31)	(Royal Dutch Football Association) Tigers Roermond
14	DF	Mohamed Chih	12 August 1999 (aged 25)	(Royal Dutch Football Association) Os Lusitanos

=== Paraguay ===
The final squad was announced on 30 August 2024.

Head coach: Carlos Chilavert

No.	Pos.	Player	Date of birth (age)	Club
1	GK	Igor Insfrán	29 August 2002 (aged 22)	(Paraguayan Football Association) Club Olimpia
2	DF	Alan Rojas	20 October 1998 (aged 25)	(French Football Federation) Sporting Paris
3	DF	Damián Mareco (captain)	4 September 1994 (aged 30)	(Royal Spanish Football Federation) Córdoba Futsal
4	MF	Emerson Méndez	18 November 2001 (aged 22)	(Paraguayan Football Association) Cerro Porteño
5	GK	Marcio Ramírez	10 June 2004 (aged 20)	(Paraguayan Football Association) Club Olimpia
6	MF	Lucas Suárez	7 February 1993 (aged 31)	(Argentine Football Association) 17 de Agosto
7	FW	Javier Adolfo Salas	22 September 1993 (aged 30)	(Italian Football Federation) Napoli C5
8	MF	Pedro Pascottini	30 November 1998 (aged 25)	(Paraguayan Football Association) Cerro Porteño
9	MF	Hugo Martínez	12 January 1993 (aged 31)	(French Football Federation) Béthune Essars Futsal
10	FW	Arnaldo Báez	30 March 1996 (aged 28)	(Royal Spanish Football Federation) Córdoba Futsal
11	FW	Francisco Martínez	12 January 1993 (aged 31)	(French Football Federation) Béthune Essars Futsal
12	GK	Giovanni González	5 May 1995 (aged 29)	(Royal Spanish Football Federation) Servigroup Peñíscola
13	FW	Aldo Amarilla	31 December 1994 (aged 29)	(French Football Federation) Sporting Paris
14	MF	Jorge Espinoza	22 November 1993 (aged 30)	(Paraguayan Football Association) Cerro Porteño

=== Costa Rica ===
The final squad was announced on 16 August 2024.

Head coach: Alexander Ramos

No.	Pos.	Player	Date of birth (age)	Club
1	GK	César Vargas	15 February 1998 (aged 23)	(Costa Rican Football Federation) AD Borussia
2	MF	Gilberth Vindas	7 December 1997 (aged 23)	(Polish Football Association) FC Toruń
3	MF	Jeremy Gómez	21 October 2001 (aged 19)	(Costa Rican Football Federation) San Isidro Futsal
4	FW	Diego Chavarría	29 November 2002 (aged 18)	(Costa Rican Football Federation) Sporting FC
5	DF	Jean Carlo Salas	4 July 1998 (aged 23)	(Estonian Football Association) Sillamäe Silla FC
6	DF	Víctor Fonseca (captain)	16 November 1992 (aged 28)	(Costa Rican Football Federation) RS Hatillo Futsal
7	FW	Minor Cabalceta	24 May 1994 (aged 27)	(Polish Football Association) BSF Bochnia
8	MF	Yosel León	9 May 2000 (aged 21)	(Estonian Football Association) Sillamäe Silla FC
9	MF	Pablo Rodríguez	15 May 1998 (aged 23)	(Polish Football Association) FC Toruń
10	MF	Edwin Cubillo	23 August 1987 (aged 34)	(Costa Rican Football Federation) AD Borussia
11	MF	Daniel Gómez	8 July 1994 (aged 27)	(Costa Rican Football Federation) Orotina Futsal
12	GK	Danny Vásquez	7 November 2001 (aged 19)	(Costa Rican Football Federation) Sporting FC
13	MF	Luis Navarrete	25 August 1991 (aged 30)	(Costa Rican Football Federation) RS Hatillo Futsal
14	FW	Emanuel Gamboa	24 July 1999 (aged 22)	(Costa Rican Football Federation) Paraíso Futsal

== Group B ==
=== Brazil ===
Initial list with 15 athletes was announced on 18 July 2024 and has not changed until the departure of the delegation to Uzbekistan. However the player Lucas Gomes, was not included in the final list of 14 players.

Head coach: Marquinhos Xavier

No.	Pos.	Player	Date of birth (age)	Club
1	GK	Guitta	11 June 1987 (aged 37)	(Russian Football Union) MFK Ukhta
2	GK	Diego Roncáglio	15 July 1988 (aged 36)	(Royal Belgian Football Association) Anderlecht
3	GK	Willian Dorn	16 December 1994 (aged 29)	(Russian Football Union) Norilsk Nickel
4	DF	Marlon	28 December 1987 (aged 36)	(Royal Spanish Football Federation) ElPozo Murcia
5	DF	Neguinho	12 July 2000 (aged 24)	(Royal Spanish Football Federation) Palma Futsal
6	MF	Marcel	26 July 1996 (aged 28)	(Royal Spanish Football Federation) ElPozo Murcia
7	MF	Dyego Zuffo (captain)	5 August 1989 (aged 35)	(Royal Spanish Football Federation) FC Barcelona
8	MF	Marcênio	5 October 1987 (aged 36)	(Brazilian Football Confederation) Jaraguá
9	MF	Leandro Lino	25 July 1995 (aged 29)	(Brazilian Football Confederation) Magnus Futsal
10	FW	Pito	6 November 1991 (aged 32)	(Royal Spanish Football Federation) FC Barcelona
11	FW	Ferrão	29 October 1990 (aged 33)	(Kazakhstan Football Federation) Semey
12	MF	Arthur Guilherme	16 May 1994 (aged 30)	(Portuguese Football Federation) Benfica
13	FW	Rafa Santos	25 September 1990 (aged 33)	(Royal Spanish Football Federation) ElPozo Murcia
14	MF	Felipe Valério	8 July 1993 (aged 31)	(Royal Spanish Football Federation) ElPozo Murcia

=== Cuba ===
Head coach: Osmel Valdivia

No.	Pos.	Player	Date of birth (age)	Club
1	GK	Kevin Rueda	27 December 2003 (aged 20)	(Football Association of Cuba) FC Ciego de Ávila
2	MF	Dyllan Hernández	15 April 2005 (aged 19)	(Football Association of Cuba) La Habana Futsal
3	MF	Cristian Cabrera	24 April 2002 (aged 22)	(Football Association of Cuba) FC Camagüey
4	DF	Jorge González	5 February 2002 (aged 22)	(Football Association of Cuba) La Habana Futsal
5	DF	Cristian Morejon	27 March 2003 (aged 21)	(Football Association of Cuba) La Habana Futsal
6	FW	Berni Llanes	25 July 2005 (aged 19)	(Football Association of Cuba) La Habana Futsal
7	MF	Cristian Valiente	11 July 2001 (aged 23)	(Football Association of Cuba) FC Holguín
8	MF	Pablo Tamayo	15 September 2002 (aged 21)	(Football Association of Cuba) FC Ciego de Ávila
9	FW	Jonathan Hernández (captain)	23 January 2001 (aged 23)	(Argentine Football Association) Newell's Old Boys
10	MF	Iduan Martínez	25 February 2000 (aged 24)	(Nicaraguan Football Federation) Camoapa FC
11	MF	Dayan Cotilla	2 July 2000 (aged 24)	(Nicaraguan Football Federation) Camoapa FC
12	GK	Ariel Pérez	28 May 1991 (aged 33)	(Football Association of Cuba) La Habana Futsal
13	MF	Diego Ramírez	3 November 1998 (aged 25)	(Royal Spanish Football Federation) FS Riba-Roja
14	FW	Bárbaro Álvarez	17 April 2000 (aged 24)	(Nicaraguan Football Federation) Camoapa FC

=== Croatia ===
The final squad was announced on 20 August 2024.

Head coach: Marinko Mavrović

No.	Pos.	Player	Date of birth (age)	Club
1	GK	Zoran Primić	21 April 1991 (aged 33)	(Croatian Football Federation) MNK Square
2	GK	Filip Bašković	9 January 1993 (aged 31)	(Croatian Football Federation) MNK Novo Vrijeme
3	MF	Kristian Čekol	30 December 1997 (aged 26)	(Croatian Football Federation) Futsal Dinamo
4	DF	Duje Kustura	2 July 1998 (aged 26)	(Croatian Football Federation) MNK Olmissum
5	DF	Niko Vukmir	27 August 2001 (aged 23)	(Croatian Football Federation) Futsal Pula
6	MF	Marko Kuraja	27 February 1997 (aged 27)	(Latvian Football Federation) RFS Futsal
7	MF	Franco Jelovčić (captain)	6 July 1991 (aged 33)	(Croatian Football Federation) MNK Torcida
8	MF	Dario Marinović	24 May 1990 (aged 34)	(Croatian Football Federation) MNK Torcida
9	FW	Luka Perić	9 February 1997 (aged 27)	(Football Association of Bosnia and Herzegovina) MNK Bubamara Cazin
10	DF	Tihomir Novak	24 October 1986 (aged 37)	(Croatian Football Federation) Futsal Dinamo
11	FW	Antonio Sekulić	22 January 1999 (aged 25)	(Royal Belgian Football Association) Anderlecht
12	MF	Josip Jurlina	13 January 2000 (aged 24)	(Croatian Football Federation) MNK Olmissum
13	FW	David Mataja	17 March 1997 (aged 27)	(Croatian Football Federation) Futsal Pula
14	MF	Kristijan Postružin	28 August 1995 (aged 29)	(Football Association of Bosnia and Herzegovina) MNK Bubamara Cazin

=== Thailand ===
The final squad was announced on 6 September 2024.

Head coach: (Spain) Miguel Rodrigo

No.	Pos.	Player	Date of birth (age)	Club
1	GK	Arut Senbat	26 November 1988 (aged 35)	(Football Association of Thailand) Black Pearl United
2	DF	Narongsak Wingwon	18 February 1998 (aged 26)	(Football Association of Thailand) Hongyen Thakam
3	MF	Alongkorn Janphon	16 September 1994 (aged 29)	(Football Association of Thailand) Port Futsal Club
4	MF	Krit Aransanyalak	27 March 2001 (aged 23)	(Football Association of Thailand) Chonburi Bluewave
5	DF	Itticha Praphaphan	31 December 1991 (aged 32)	(Football Association of Thailand) Port Futsal Club
6	DF	Jirawat Sornwichian (captain)	25 October 1988 (aged 35)	(Football Association of Thailand) Thammasat Stallion
7	MF	Kritsada Wongkaeo	29 April 1988 (aged 36)	(Football Association of Thailand) Chonburi Bluewave
8	MF	Worasak Srirangpirot	26 December 1992 (aged 31)	(Football Association of Thailand) Hongyen Thakam
9	FW	Suphawut Thueanklang	14 July 1989 (aged 35)	(Football Association of Thailand) Chonburi Bluewave
10	DF	Sarawut Phalaphruek	9 June 1997 (aged 27)	(Football Association of Thailand) Hongyen Thakam
11	FW	Muhammad Osamanmusa	19 January 1998 (aged 26)	(Royal Spanish Football Federation) Jimbee Cartagena
12	GK	Katawut Hankampa	27 May 1992 (aged 32)	(Football Association of Thailand) Thammasat Stallion
13	DF	Ronnachai Jungwongsuk	4 March 1997 (aged 27)	(Football Association of Thailand) Chonburi Bluewave
14	MF	Apiwat Chaemcharoen	31 March 1991 (aged 33)	(Football Association of Thailand) Chonburi Bluewave

== Group C ==
=== Argentina ===
The final squad was announced on 3 September 2024. Andrés Geraghty had to withdrawn from the squad due to an injury and was replaced by Kevin Arrieta.

Head coach: Matías Lucuix

No.	Pos.	Player	Date of birth (age)	Club
1	GK	Nicolás Sarmiento	3 December 1992 (aged 31)	(Royal Belgian Football Association) Anderlecht
2	DF	Lucas Tripodi	18 June 1994 (aged 30)	(Royal Spanish Football Federation) Ribera Navarra FS
3	MF	Ángel Claudino	8 December 1995 (aged 28)	(Latvian Football Federation) Riga FC
4	DF	Lucas Bolo Alemany	12 March 1992 (aged 32)	(Italian Football Federation) Napoli C5
5	FW	Agustín Plaza	5 July 1999 (aged 25)	(Royal Spanish Football Federation) Servigroup Peñíscola
6	MF	Sebastián Corso	12 February 1992 (aged 32)	(Royal Spanish Football Federation) Industrias Santa Coloma
7	MF	Matías Rosa	18 September 1995 (aged 28)	(Royal Spanish Football Federation) Jaén Paraíso Interior
8	MF	Luciano Gauna	24 February 2001 (aged 23)	(Royal Spanish Football Federation) Servigroup Peñíscola
9	FW	Cristian Borruto	7 May 1987 (aged 37)	(Italian Football Federation) Napoli C5
10	MF	Constantino Vaporaki	6 January 1990 (aged 34)	(Latvian Football Federation) RFS Futsal
11	FW	Alan Brandi	24 November 1987 (aged 36)	(Royal Spanish Football Federation) Jaén Paraíso Interior
12	GK	Nicolás Kravetzky	18 October 1996 (aged 27)	(Argentine Football Association) Barracas Central
13	MF	Kevin Arrieta	16 February 1997 (aged 27)	(Royal Spanish Football Federation) Alzira FS
14	DF	Pablo Taborda (captain)	3 September 1986 (aged 38)	(Italian Football Federation) Ecocity Genzano

=== Ukraine ===
The final squad was announced on 8 September 2024.

Head coach: Oleksandr Kosenko

No.	Pos.	Player	Date of birth (age)	Club
1	GK	Kyrylo Tsypun	30 July 1987 (aged 37)	(Polish Football Association) Piast Gliwice
2	GK	Oleksandr Sukhov	8 June 1997 (aged 27)	(Ukrainian Association of Football) HIT Kyiv
3	DF	Nazar Shved	16 March 1997 (aged 27)	(Polish Football Association) Eurobus Przemyśl
4	FW	Andriy Melnyk	10 May 2000 (aged 24)	(Ukrainian Association of Football) HIT Kyiv
5	DF	Yevheniy Zhuk	15 April 1993 (aged 31)	(Ukrainian Association of Football) HIT Kyiv
6	MF	Mykola Mykytiuk	13 September 1996 (aged 28)	(Royal Spanish Football Federation) Córdoba Futsal
7	FW	Rostyslav Semenchenko	1 September 2003 (aged 21)	(Ukrainian Association of Football) Aurora Futsal
8	DF	Ihor Cherniavskiy	14 September 1995 (aged 29)	(Ukrainian Association of Football) HIT Kyiv
9	FW	Danyil Abakshyn	22 December 1997 (aged 26)	(Ukrainian Association of Football) HIT Kyiv
10	DF	Mykhailo Zvarych	23 November 1992 (aged 31)	(Ukrainian Association of Football) Energia Lviv
11	FW	Artem Fareniuk	9 November 1992 (aged 31)	(Polish Football Association) Eurobus Przemyśl
12	GK	Yuriy Savenko	21 January 1992 (aged 32)	(Ukrainian Association of Football) Aurora Futsal
13	DF	Ihor Korsun	15 June 1993 (aged 31)	(Royal Spanish Football Federation) Osasuna Magna Xota
14	DF	Petro Shoturma (captain)	27 June 1992 (aged 32)	(Ukrainian Association of Football) Uragan Ivano-Frankivsk

=== Afghanistan ===
The final squad was announced on 9 September 2024.

Head coach: (Iran) Majid Mortezaei

No.	Pos.	Player	Date of birth (age)	Club
1	GK	Javad Safari	16 March 2000 (aged 24)	(Football Federation Islamic Republic of Iran) Giti Pasand
2	GK	Alireza Jafari	23 January 2005 (aged 19)	(Football Federation Islamic Republic of Iran) Safir Gofteman
3	GK	Ali Ahmad Mohseni	3 June 2003 (aged 21)	(Afghanistan Football Federation) Sidaqat Kabul
4	DF	Mahdi Norowzi (captain)	11 May 1996 (aged 28)	(Football Federation Islamic Republic of Iran) Sunich Saveh
5	MF	Hussain Mohammadi	28 January 2005 (aged 19)	(Football Federation Islamic Republic of Iran) Farsh Ara Mashhad
6	MF	Hamid Reza Hossaini	30 September 2000 (aged 23)	(Afghanistan Football Federation) Saadat Nimrooz
7	DF	Reza Hosseinpour	23 August 1999 (aged 25)	(Afghanistan Football Federation) Asree Jadid
8	MF	Mehran Gholami	31 October 2005 (aged 18)	(Afghanistan Football Federation) Sidaqat Kabul
9	FW	Omid Qanbari	29 June 2004 (aged 20)	(Afghanistan Football Federation) Sidaqat Kabul
10	FW	Akbar Kazemi	12 May 1996 (aged 28)	(Afghanistan Football Federation) Sidaqat Kabul
11	MF	Mohammad Moradi	22 May 2005 (aged 19)	(Football Federation Islamic Republic of Iran) Giti Pasand
12	MF	Farzad Mahmoodi	14 April 1999 (aged 25)	(Afghanistan Football Federation) Piroze Panjsher
13	DF	Khodadad Ebrahimi	2 March 2004 (aged 20)	(Afghanistan Football Federation) Sidaqat Kabul
14	DF	Sayed Mojtaba Hosseini	6 October 2003 (aged 20)	(Afghanistan Football Federation) Saadat Nimrooz

=== Angola ===
The final squad was announced on 7 September 2024.

Head coach: (Portugal) Marcos Antunes

No.	Pos.	Player	Date of birth (age)	Club
1	GK	Gomito	4 August 2002 (aged 22)	(Portuguese Football Federation) G.D. Macedense
2	DF	Arroz Doce	3 July 1997 (aged 27)	(Angolan Football Federation) SCDR Maculusso
3	DF	Vedo	9 May 2000 (aged 24)	(Angolan Football Federation) 4 de Junho Huambo
4	FW	Pesado	22 June 2001 (aged 23)	(Angolan Football Federation) JCY de Luanda
5	FW	Bráulio Fontoura	6 August 1994 (aged 30)	(Angolan Football Federation) G.D. RNT
6	MF	Anderson Fortes	20 January 2004 (aged 20)	(Portuguese Football Federation) Leões de Porto Salvo
7	MF	Helber Garcia	27 August 2000 (aged 24)	(Angolan Football Federation) SCDR Maculusso
8	DF	Chico	30 May 1997 (aged 27)	(Angolan Football Federation) Sagrada Esperança
9	MF	Kaluanda	8 March 1995 (aged 29)	(Angolan Football Federation) JCY de Luanda
10	MF	Jó Mahrez	15 April 1998 (aged 26)	(Portuguese Football Federation) SC Ferreira do Zêzere
11	FW	Adérito Barros	3 August 2001 (aged 23)	(Angolan Football Federation) JCY de Luanda
12	GK	Nelsinho	19 September 1990 (aged 33)	(Angolan Football Federation) SCDR Maculusso
13	DF	Paulo Ricardo (captain)	10 September 2001 (aged 23)	(Angolan Football Federation) SCDR Maculusso
14	GK	Dennis	5 May 2003 (aged 21)	(Angolan Football Federation) G.D. RNT

== Group D ==
=== Spain ===
The final squad was announced on 4 September 2024. César Velasco had to withdrawn from the squad due to an injury and was replaced by Jesús Gordillo.

Head coach: Fede Vidal

No.	Pos.	Player	Date of birth (age)	Club
1	GK	Jesús Herrero	4 November 1986 (aged 37)	(Royal Spanish Football Federation) Inter Movistar
2	DF	Antonio Pérez	19 October 2000 (aged 23)	(Royal Spanish Football Federation) FC Barcelona
3	MF	Juanjo Catela	15 April 1995 (aged 29)	(Royal Spanish Football Federation) FC Barcelona
4	DF	Tomaz Braga	13 September 1990 (aged 34)	(Royal Spanish Football Federation) Jimbee Cartagena
5	DF	Boyis Sánchez	26 December 1989 (aged 34)	(Royal Spanish Football Federation) Viña Albali Valdepeñas
6	FW	Raúl Gómez	25 October 1995 (aged 28)	(Royal Spanish Football Federation) Inter Movistar
7	MF	Francisco Cortés	13 October 1995 (aged 28)	(Royal Spanish Football Federation) Jimbee Cartagena
8	MF	Adolfo Fernández	19 May 1993 (aged 31)	(Royal Spanish Football Federation) FC Barcelona
9	MF	Sergio Lozano	9 November 1988 (aged 35)	(Royal Spanish Football Federation) FC Barcelona
10	MF	Jesús Gordillo	8 February 2001 (aged 23)	(Royal Spanish Football Federation) Palma Futsal
11	GK	Chemi	19 February 1996 (aged 28)	(Royal Spanish Football Federation) Jimbee Cartagena
12	GK	Dídac Plana	22 May 1990 (aged 34)	(Royal Spanish Football Federation) FC Barcelona
13	MF	Miguel Mellado	23 July 1999 (aged 25)	(Royal Spanish Football Federation) Jimbee Cartagena
14	FW	Raúl Campos (captain)	17 December 1987 (aged 36)	(Royal Spanish Football Federation) Manzanares FS

=== Kazakhstan ===
The final squad was announced on 7 September 2024.

Head coach: (Brazil) Kaká

No.	Pos.	Player	Date of birth (age)	Club
1	GK	Narun Serikov	30 September 2001 (aged 22)	(Kazakhstan Football Federation) Kairat
2	GK	Leo Higuita (captain)	6 June 1986 (aged 38)	(Kazakhstan Football Federation) Semey
3	DF	Arnold Knaub	16 January 1995 (aged 29)	(Kazakhstan Football Federation) Astana
4	FW	Rinat Turegazin	2 July 1995 (aged 29)	(Kazakhstan Football Federation) Semey
5	FW	Akzhol Daribay	26 July 1999 (aged 25)	(Kazakhstan Football Federation) Semey
6	FW	Abdirassil Abdumanapuly	20 December 2000 (aged 23)	(Kazakhstan Football Federation) Ayat
7	FW	Azat Valiullin	5 May 1992 (aged 32)	(Kazakhstan Football Federation) Ayat
8	DF	Leo Jaraguá	21 May 1987 (aged 37)	(Latvian Football Federation) RFS Futsal
9	FW	Albert Akbalikov	5 January 1995 (aged 29)	(Kazakhstan Football Federation) Kairat
10	DF	Chingiz Yesenamanov	10 March 1989 (aged 35)	(Kazakhstan Football Federation) Semey
11	DF	Birzhan Orazov	17 October 1994 (aged 29)	(Kazakhstan Football Federation) Kairat
12	FW	Dauren Tursagulov	16 January 1996 (aged 28)	(Kazakhstan Football Federation) Kairat
13	FW	Zhakhangir Rashit	28 March 2000 (aged 24)	(Kazakhstan Football Federation) Kairat
14	DF	Douglas Júnior	15 October 1988 (aged 35)	(Saudi Arabian Football Federation) Al-Ula

=== New Zealand ===
The final squad was announced on 28 August 2024.

Head coach: Marvin Eakins

No.	Pos.	Player	Date of birth (age)	Club
1	GK	Mike Antamanov	27 April 1987 (aged 37)	(New Zealand Football) Auckland City Futsal
2	MF	Adam Paulsen	2 June 2001 (aged 23)	(New Zealand Football) Auckland City Futsal
3	MF	Hamish Grey	6 April 2002 (aged 22)	(Royal Spanish Football Federation) Zambú CFS Pinatar
4	FW	Art Twigg	17 April 1997 (aged 27)	(New Zealand Football) Auckland City Futsal
5	DF	Miroslav Malivuk	17 July 1983 (aged 41)	(New Zealand Football) Palmerston North Marist
6	FW	Rahan Ali	3 April 1997 (aged 27)	(Football Australia) Moreland Blues FC
7	DF	Ethan Martin	11 January 2000 (aged 24)	(New Zealand Football) Waikato Rapids
8	DF	Logan Wisnewski	16 November 2000 (aged 23)	(The Football Association) Bloomsbury Futsal
9	DF	Stephen Ashby-Peckham	9 April 1995 (aged 29)	(New Zealand Football) Auckland City Futsal
10	MF	Dylan Manickum (captain)	16 June 1992 (aged 32)	(New Zealand Football) Auckland City Futsal
11	MF	Jordan Ditfort	9 June 1998 (aged 26)	(The Football Association) Bloomsbury Futsal
12	GK	Patrick Steele	14 November 2000 (aged 23)	(New Zealand Football) Waikato Rapids
13	MF	Oban Hawkins	6 October 2000 (aged 23)	(New Zealand Football) Southern United
14	MF	Casey Sharplin	26 August 2001 (aged 23)	(New Zealand Football) Waikato Rapids

=== Libya ===
Head coach: (Spain) Ricardo Iñiguez

No.	Pos.	Player	Date of birth (age)	Club
1	GK	Ziyad Azeez	12 October 2000 (aged 23)	(Libyan Football Federation) Al-Ittihad
2	DF	Ahmed Abdelhafide	1 September 1994 (aged 30)	(Royal Moroccan Football Federation) RS Berkane
3	DF	Abraheem Suhayb	29 January 1996 (aged 28)	(Libyan Football Federation) Al-Ahly
4	FW	Mohamed Zreeg	28 April 1991 (aged 33)	(Libyan Football Federation) Olympic
5	DF	Suliman Aldrwish	15 December 1990 (aged 33)	(Libyan Football Federation) Asswehly
6	DF	Husam Banina	3 December 1993 (aged 30)	(Libyan Football Federation) Al-Ittihad
7	MF	Ahmed Alajnef	14 December 2000 (aged 23)	(Libyan Football Federation) Olympic
8	MF	Mohamed Khamis	1 December 1995 (aged 28)	(Libyan Football Federation) Asswehly
9	FW	Ali Jazoora	17 September 1992 (aged 31)	(Libyan Football Federation) Asswehly
10	MF	Ahmed Alyamny	3 June 1994 (aged 30)	(Libyan Football Federation) Al-Ahly
11	MF	Rashid Hakam	20 January 1998 (aged 26)	(Libyan Football Federation) Olympic
12	GK	Feras Abuksheam	2 December 1995 (aged 28)	(Libyan Football Federation) Olympic
13	MF	Ibrahim Lemhammel	25 August 1999 (aged 25)	(Libyan Football Federation) Asswehly
14	DF	Mohamed Suleiman (captain)	27 September 1988 (aged 35)	(Libyan Football Federation) Al-Ittihad

== Group E ==
=== Portugal ===
The final squad was announced on 5 September 2024.

Head coach: Jorge Braz

No.	Pos.	Player	Date of birth (age)	Club
1	GK	Edu Sousa	19 August 1996 (aged 28)	(Royal Spanish Football Federation) ElPozo Murcia
2	DF	André Coelho	30 October 1993 (aged 30)	(Portuguese Football Federation) Benfica
3	DF	Tomás Paçó	19 April 2000 (aged 24)	(Portuguese Football Federation) Sporting CP
4	DF	Afonso Jesus	6 January 1998 (aged 26)	(Portuguese Football Federation) Benfica
5	FW	Fábio Cecílio	30 April 1993 (aged 31)	(Portuguese Football Federation) SC Braga
6	FW	Zicky Té	1 September 2001 (aged 23)	(Portuguese Football Federation) Sporting CP
7	MF	Lúcio Rocha	5 May 2004 (aged 20)	(Portuguese Football Federation) Benfica
8	MF	Erick Mendonça	21 July 1995 (aged 29)	(Royal Spanish Football Federation) FC Barcelona
9	DF	João Matos (captain)	21 February 1987 (aged 37)	(Portuguese Football Federation) Sporting CP
10	MF	Bruno Coelho	1 August 1987 (aged 37)	(Latvian Football Federation) RFS Futsal
11	MF	Pany Varela	25 February 1989 (aged 35)	(Saudi Arabian Football Federation) Al Nassr
12	GK	André Correia	17 February 1998 (aged 26)	(Portuguese Football Federation) Benfica
13	MF	Tiago Brito	22 July 1991 (aged 33)	(Portuguese Football Federation) SC Braga
14	MF	Edmilson Kutchy	12 October 2002 (aged 21)	(Portuguese Football Federation) Benfica

=== Panama ===
The final squad was announced on 4 September 2024.

Head coach: Alex Del Rosario

No.	Pos.	Player	Date of birth (age)	Club
1	GK	Jaime Peñaloza (captain)	3 May 1997 (aged 27)	(Panamanian Football Federation) CD Los Lobos
2	DF	José Caballero	27 August 1996 (aged 28)	(Panamanian Football Federation) Villa 9 La Paz
3	MF	Mario Forero	5 December 1998 (aged 25)	(Panamanian Football Federation) Chorrillo FC
4	MF	Yail García	26 October 1991 (aged 32)	(Panamanian Football Federation) Villa 9 La Paz
5	DF	Ricardo Castillo	15 November 1996 (aged 27)	(Panamanian Football Federation) Villa 9 La Paz
6	MF	Abdiel Ortiz	1 July 1996 (aged 28)	(Panamanian Football Federation) CD Los Lobos
7	DF	José Escobar	7 February 2000 (aged 24)	(Panamanian Football Federation) CD Milenio Panamá Oeste
8	MF	Ruman Milord	4 May 1998 (aged 26)	(Panamanian Football Federation) CD Los Lobos
9	FW	Aquiles Campos	13 November 1991 (aged 32)	(Panamanian Football Federation) CD Los Lobos
10	DF	Alfonso Maquensi	7 August 1997 (aged 27)	(Peruvian Football Federation) Panta Walon
11	FW	Abdiel Castrellón	19 July 1991 (aged 33)	(Panamanian Football Federation) Perejil FC
12	GK	José Álvarez	29 October 1990 (aged 33)	(Panamanian Football Federation) Villa 9 La Paz
13	MF	Luis Vásquez	19 October 1996 (aged 27)	(Costa Rican Football Federation) Paraíso Futsal
14	MF	José Yearwood	12 March 2001 (aged 23)	(Panamanian Football Federation) Villa 9 La Paz

=== Tajikistan ===
The final squad was announced on 11 September 2024.

Head coach: Pairav Vakhidov

No.	Pos.	Player	Date of birth (age)	Club
1	GK	Nuriddin Dzhabarov	2 March 2002 (aged 22)	(Tajikistan Football Federation) Soro Company
2	GK	Firuz Bekmurodov	10 January 1998 (aged 26)	(Tajikistan Football Federation) Istiklol
3	DF	Abduqaiyum Umarov	11 February 2001 (aged 23)	(Tajikistan Football Federation) Istiklol
4	DF	Nasratsho Ismoilov	20 January 2002 (aged 22)	(Tajikistan Football Federation) Istiklol
5	MF	Samandar Rizomov	5 January 2001 (aged 23)	(Tajikistan Football Federation) Soro Company
6	MF	Idris Yorov	18 September 2000 (aged 23)	(Tajikistan Football Federation) Soro Company
7	MF	Bahodur Khojaev	26 April 1995 (aged 29)	(Tajikistan Football Federation) Istaravshan
8	MF	Muhamadjon Sharipov	14 September 1998 (aged 26)	(Tajikistan Football Federation) Istiklol
9	FW	Fayzali Sardorov	8 April 1998 (aged 26)	(Tajikistan Football Federation) Soro Company
10	MF	Nekruz Alimakhmadov	10 August 1995 (aged 29)	(Tajikistan Football Federation) Istiklol
11	FW	Komron Aliev	8 February 2001 (aged 23)	(Tajikistan Football Federation) Istiklol
12	MF	Umed Kuziev	17 December 1997 (aged 26)	(Tajikistan Football Federation) Amonatbank
13	DF	Bakhtiyor Soliev	16 December 2001 (aged 22)	(Tajikistan Football Federation) Soro Company
14	DF	Dilshod Salomov (captain)	5 October 1995 (aged 28)	(Tajikistan Football Federation) Soro Company

=== Morocco ===
The final squad was announced on 3 September 2024.

Head coach: Hicham Dguig

No.	Pos.	Player	Date of birth (age)	Club
1	GK	Abdelkrim Anbia	8 April 1989 (aged 35)	(Royal Moroccan Football Federation) ASF Agadir
2	MF	Anas Dahani	14 December 1999 (aged 24)	(Royal Moroccan Football Federation) ASF Agadir
3	FW	Anás El Ayyane	30 October 1992 (aged 31)	(Italian Football Federation) Meta Catania
4	MF	Mohamed Kamal	4 January 2003 (aged 21)	(Royal Moroccan Football Federation) RS Berkane
5	MF	Othmane El Idrissi	7 August 1999 (aged 25)	(Royal Moroccan Football Federation) CL Ksar El Kebir
6	DF	Soufiane Borite	11 December 1992 (aged 31)	(Football Association of Finland) FC Kemi
7	DF	Ismail Amazal	10 October 1996 (aged 27)	(Royal Moroccan Football Federation) ASF Agadir
8	FW	Soufian Charraoui	15 November 1996 (aged 27)	(Royal Dutch Football Association) Tigers Roermond
9	FW	Otmane Boumezou	8 July 1992 (aged 32)	(French Football Federation) GOAL Futsal Club
10	MF	Soufiane El Mesrar (captain)	5 June 1990 (aged 34)	(French Football Federation) Étoile Lavalloise
11	MF	Khalid Bouzid	20 April 1998 (aged 26)	(Royal Spanish Football Federation) FC Barcelona
12	GK	Mohammed Cheridou	20 September 1999 (aged 24)	(Royal Moroccan Football Federation) AOKH Kenitra
13	GK	Youssef Ben Sellam	16 August 2000 (aged 24)	(Royal Dutch Football Association) FC Eindhoven
14	MF	Idriss Raiss El-Fenni	9 May 1996 (aged 28)	(Royal Moroccan Football Federation) CL Ksar El Kebir

== Group F ==
=== Iran ===
The final squad was announced on 2 September 2024.

Head coach: Vahid Shamsaei

No.	Pos.	Player	Date of birth (age)	Club
1	GK	Bagher Mohammadi	21 June 1991 (aged 33)	(Football Federation Islamic Republic of Iran) Giti Pasand
2	GK	Saeid Momeni	23 November 1992 (aged 31)	(Football Federation Islamic Republic of Iran) Crop Alvand
3	MF	Sajad Youssefkhah	17 April 1995 (aged 29)	(Football Federation Islamic Republic of Iran) Crop Alvand
4	DF	Alireza Rafieipour	9 October 1993 (aged 30)	(Football Federation Islamic Republic of Iran) Giti Pasand
5	DF	Mohammad Hossein Derakhshani	1 April 1993 (aged 31)	(Football Federation Islamic Republic of Iran) Giti Pasand
6	DF	Mohammad Reza Sangsefidi	2 November 1989 (aged 34)	(Football Federation Islamic Republic of Iran) Giti Pasand
7	MF	Ali Asghar Hassanzadeh (captain)	2 November 1987 (aged 36)	(Football Federation Islamic Republic of Iran) Mes Sungun
8	MF	Moslem Oladghobad	29 November 1995 (aged 28)	(Football Federation Islamic Republic of Iran) Gohar Zamin
9	FW	Saeid Ahmadabbasi	31 July 1992 (aged 32)	(Football Federation Islamic Republic of Iran) Giti Pasand
10	FW	Hossein Tayyebi	29 September 1988 (aged 35)	(Football Federation Islamic Republic of Iran) Gohar Zamin
11	MF	Mahdi Karimi	28 January 1997 (aged 27)	(Football Federation Islamic Republic of Iran) Giti Pasand
12	MF	Salar Aghapour	7 March 2000 (aged 24)	(Football Federation Islamic Republic of Iran) Gohar Zamin
13	MF	Amir Hossein Davoudi	16 August 2002 (aged 22)	(Football Federation Islamic Republic of Iran) Giti Pasand
14	FW	Behrooz Azimi	25 August 2001 (aged 23)	(Football Federation Islamic Republic of Iran) Mes Sungun

=== Venezuela ===
The final squad was announced on 9 September 2024.

Head coach: Robinson Romero

No.	Pos.	Player	Date of birth (age)	Club
1	GK	Carlos Vásquez	3 March 1989 (aged 35)	(Venezuelan Football Federation) Centauros de Caracas
2	DF	Carlos Sanz	21 March 1996 (aged 28)	(Royal Spanish Football Federation) Jaén Paraíso Interior
3	FW	Wilmer Cabarcas	15 September 1994 (aged 29)	(Italian Football Federation) Manfredonia C5
4	DF	Carlos Jiménez	4 May 1991 (aged 33)	(Venezuelan Football Federation) Piratas de La Guaira
5	MF	Alexander Moreno	3 October 1994 (aged 29)	(Venezuelan Football Federation) Monagas Futsal
6	MF	Víctor Carreño	4 May 1999 (aged 25)	(Venezuelan Football Federation) Centauros de Caracas
7	MF	Jesús Viamonte	9 April 1997 (aged 27)	(Uruguayan Football Association) Peñarol
8	MF	Maikel Torres	24 November 1999 (aged 24)	(Venezuelan Football Federation) Centauros de Caracas
9	FW	Kevin Briceño	24 August 2000 (aged 24)	(Venezuelan Football Federation) Centauros de Caracas
10	DF	Rafael Morillo (captain)	20 October 1992 (aged 31)	(Venezuelan Football Federation) Centauros de Caracas
11	MF	Alfredo Vidal	3 February 1994 (aged 30)	(Peruvian Football Federation) Panta Walon
12	GK	José Villalobos	26 November 1991 (aged 32)	(Venezuelan Football Federation) Monagas Futsal
13	DF	Milton Francia	18 December 1994 (aged 29)	(Venezuelan Football Federation) Piratas de La Guaira
14	DF	Saimond Francia	22 February 2004 (aged 20)	(Venezuelan Football Federation) Centauros de Caracas

=== Guatemala ===
The final squad was announced on 10 September 2024.

Head coach: Carlos Estrada

No.	Pos.	Player	Date of birth (age)	Club
1	GK	Angel Mazariegos	29 April 1999 (aged 25)	(National Football Federation of Guatemala) Legendarios FSC
2	GK	José Reyes	20 November 1995 (aged 28)	(National Football Federation of Guatemala) Glucosoral FSC
3	DF	Jenner Paniagua	27 December 1997 (aged 26)	(National Football Federation of Guatemala) Legendarios FSC
4	FW	Nelson Tagre	25 January 2000 (aged 24)	(National Football Federation of Guatemala) Glucosoral FSC
5	DF	Edgar Santizo	2 February 1987 (aged 37)	(National Football Federation of Guatemala) Glucosoral FSC
6	MF	José Marín	25 January 1992 (aged 32)	(National Football Federation of Guatemala) CSD Tellioz
7	MF	Román Alvarado	2 December 1997 (aged 26)	(National Football Federation of Guatemala) Glucosoral FSC
8	MF	Patrick Ruiz	10 January 1993 (aged 31)	(National Football Federation of Guatemala) Legendarios FSC
9	MF	Marvin Sandoval	22 March 1989 (aged 35)	(National Football Federation of Guatemala) Glucosoral FSC
10	MF	Wanderley Ruiz	9 August 1995 (aged 29)	(National Football Federation of Guatemala) Legendarios FSC
11	DF	Alan Aguilar (captain)	2 December 1989 (aged 34)	(National Football Federation of Guatemala) Glucosoral FSC
12	MF	Jhonny Díaz	18 March 2001 (aged 23)	(National Football Federation of Guatemala) Glucosoral FSC
13	FW	Fernando Campaignac	13 June 1994 (aged 30)	(National Football Federation of Guatemala) Glucosoral FSC
14	MF	Bryan Santizo	31 January 1995 (aged 29)	(National Football Federation of Guatemala) CSD Tellioz

=== France ===
The final squad was announced on 6 September 2024.

Head coach: Raphaël Reynaud

No.	Pos.	Player	Date of birth (age)	Club
1	GK	Francis Lokoka	8 September 1993 (aged 31)	(French Football Federation) Sporting Paris
2	DF	Sid Belhaj	28 August 1992 (aged 32)	(French Football Federation) Sporting Paris
3	MF	Siragassy Touré	15 September 2001 (aged 22)	(Royal Spanish Football Federation) FC Barcelona
4	FW	Nicolas Ménendez	3 February 1996 (aged 28)	(Croatian Football Federation) MNK Novo Vrijeme
5	FW	Arthur Tchaptchet	2 November 1995 (aged 28)	(Croatian Football Federation) MNK Novo Vrijeme
6	DF	Kévin Ramirez	10 August 1987 (aged 37)	(French Football Federation) Sporting Paris
7	MF	Steve Bendali	12 November 1994 (aged 29)	(Croatian Football Federation) Futsal Pula
8	DF	Ayoub Saadaoui	14 December 1994 (aged 29)	(French Football Federation) Kremlin-Bicêtre
9	MF	Nelson Lutin	5 December 1997 (aged 26)	(French Football Federation) Étoile Lavalloise
10	FW	Abdessamad Mohammed	10 December 1990 (aged 33)	(French Football Federation) Étoile Lavalloise
11	DF	Souheil Mouhoudine (captain)	29 March 1995 (aged 29)	(Royal Spanish Football Federation) Jimbee Cartagena
12	GK	Thibaut Garros	2 January 2003 (aged 21)	(French Football Federation) UJS Toulouse
13	DF	Mamadou Touré	27 January 1998 (aged 26)	(French Football Federation) Sporting Paris
14	MF	Ouassini Guirio	14 December 2000 (aged 23)	(French Football Federation) Étoile Lavalloise
