= João Matos =

Portuguese futsal player

João Matos ComIH ComM
Personal information
- Full name: João Nuno Alves de Matos
- Date of birth: 21 February 1987 (age 39)
- Place of birth: Lisbon, Portugal
- Height: 1.72 m (5 ft 8 in)
- Positions: Defender; winger

Team information
- Current team: Sporting CP
- Number: 9

Youth career
- 2000–2002: Clube de Carnaxide
- 2002–2006: Sporting CP

Senior career*
Years	Team	Apps	(Gls)
2005–2026	Sporting CP	489	(111)

International career^{‡}
2008–2026	Portugal	130	(18)
- * Club domestic league appearances and goals as of 00:00, 11 August 2018 (UTC) ‡ National team caps and goals as of 00:00, 11 August 2018 (UTC)

João Nuno Alves de Matos ComIH ComM (born 21 February 1987) is a former Portuguese professional futsal player who played for Sporting CP and the Portugal national team.

== Honours ==
=== Club ===
Sporting CP

- Campeonato Nacional: 2005–06, 2009–10, 2010–11, 2012–13, 2013–14, 2015–16, 2016–17, 2017–18, 2020–21, 2021–22, 2022–23, 2023–24
- Taça de Portugal: 2005–06, 2007–08, 2010–11, 2012–13, 2015–16, 2017–18, 2018–19, 2019–20, 2021–22, 2024–25
- Taça da Liga: 2015–16, 2016–17, 2020–21, 2021–22, 2023–24, 2024–25
- Supertaça de Portugal: 2008, 2010, 2013, 2014, 2017, 2018, 2019, 2021, 2022
- UEFA Futsal Champions League: 2018–19, 2020–21, 2025-2026

=== International ===
Portugal

- UEFA Futsal Championship: 2018, 2022
- FIFA Futsal World Cup: 2021
- Futsal Finalissima: 2022

=== Orders ===
- Commander of the Order of Prince Henry
- Commander of the Order of Merit
