= Zicky Té =

Portuguese futsal player

Personal information
- Full name: Izaquel Gomes Té
- Date of birth: 1 September 2001 (age 25)
- Place of birth: Bissau, Guinea-Bissau
- Height: 1.85 m (6 ft 1 in)
- Position: Pivot

Team information
- Current team: Sporting CP
- Number: 6

Youth career
- 2011–2012: GROB
- 2012–2013: PSAAC
- 2013–2020: Sporting CP

Senior career*
Years	Team	Apps	(Gls)
2018–	Sporting CP	126	(57)

International career^{‡}
2017	Portugal U17	5	(2)
2017–2018	Portugal U18	12	(9)
2018–2019	Portugal U19	5	(3)
2020	Portugal U21	1	(1)
2021–	Portugal	39	(17)
- * Club domestic league appearances and goals as of 22:15, 23 June 2023 (GMT+1) ‡ National team caps and goals as of 22:15, 23 June 2023 (GMT+1)

Izaquel Gomes Té ComIH (born 1 September 2001), known as Zicky Té, is a Bissau-Guinean-born Portuguese futsal player who plays as a pivot for Sporting CP and the Portugal national team.

== Personal life ==
Izaquiel Gomes Té moved to Portugal at the age of six because of his family and grew up playing in the so-called Bafatá rink (which is also the name of a city in Guinea-Bissau) in Santo António dos Cavaleiros, in the municipality of Loures, where he has been living since then. At 13, he was already playing for Sporting Portugal's futsal department.

== Honours ==
Sporting

- Liga Portuguesa: 2020–21, 2021–22, 2022–23, 2023-24
- Taça de Portugal: 2019–20, 2021–22
- Taça da Liga de Futsal: 2020–21, 2021–22
- Supertaça de Futsal: 2021, 2022, 2025
- UEFA Futsal Champions League: 2020–21, 2025–26

Portugal

- FIFA Futsal World Cup: 2021
- UEFA Futsal Championship: 2022
- Futsal Finalissima: 2022
