= André Coelho =

Portuguese futsal player

André Coelho ComIH ComM
Personal information
- Full name: André Henriques Nunes Coelho
- Date of birth: 30 October 1993 (age 32)
- Place of birth: Viseu, Portugal
- Height: 1.84 m (6 ft 0 in)
- Position: Defender

Youth career
- 2002–2012: ABC Nelas

Senior career*
Years	Team	Apps	(Gls)
2012–2013	ABC Nelas		
2013–2017	Braga/AAUM		
2017–2020	Benfica	90	(35)
2020–2024	Barcelona		
2024–	Benfica		

International career^{‡}
2013–2015	Portugal U21	4	(3)
2016–	Portugal	43	(12)
Medal record
Men's futsal
Representing Portugal
UEFA Futsal Championship
Runner-up	2026 Latvia / Lithuania / Slovenia
- * Club domestic league appearances and goals ‡ National team caps and goals as of 12 July 2019

André Henriques Nunes Coelho(born 30 October 1993) is a Portuguese futsal player who plays as a universal for SL Benfica and for the Portugal national team.

== Honours ==
=== Club ===
Benfica

- Campeonato Nacional: 2018–19, 2024–25, 2025–26
- Taça de Portugal: 2025–26
- Taça da Liga: 2017–18, 2018–19, 2019–20, 2025–26

Barcelona

- UEFA Futsal Champions League: 2021–22
- Primera División: 2020–21, 2021–22, 2022–23
- Copa del Rey: 2019-20, 2022–23
- Copa de España: 2022, 2024
- Supercopa de España: 2021, 2022

=== International ===
Portugal

- UEFA Futsal Championship: 2018, 2022
- FIFA Futsal World Cup: 2021
- Futsal Finalissima: 2022

=== Orders ===
- Commander of the Order of Prince Henry
- Commander of the Order of Merit
