= Afonso Jesus =

Portuguese futsal player

Personal information
- Full name: Afonso Maria Basto de Jesus
- Date of birth: 6 January 1998 (age 28)
- Place of birth: Lisbon, Portugal
- Height: 1.76 m (5 ft 9 in)
- Position: Defender

Team information
- Current team: Benfica
- Number: 4

Youth career
- 2010–2011: AD Marista
- 2011–2016: Sporting CP

Senior career*
Years	Team	Apps	(Gls)
2015–2016	Sporting CP	7	(2)
2016–	Benfica	18	(2)

International career^{‡}
2015–2017	Portugal U19	8	(2)
2015–	Portugal U21	19	(6)
2017–	Portugal	3	(0)
Medal record
Men's futsal
Representing Portugal
UEFA Futsal Championship
Runner-up	2026 Latvia / Lithuania / Slovenia
- * Club domestic league appearances and goals as of 3 April 2016 ‡ National team caps and goals as of 12 July 2019

Afonso Maria Basto de Jesus (born 6 January 1998) is a Portuguese futsal player who plays as a defender for Benfica and the Portugal national team.

== Honours ==
Benfica

- Liga Portuguesa: 2015–16, 2018–19, 2024–25, 2025–26
- Taça de Portugal: 2022–23, 2025–26
- Taça da Liga: 2017–18, 2019–2020, 2022–23, 2025–26
- Supertaça: 2023

Portugal

- FIFA Futsal World Cup: 2021
- UEFA Futsal Championship: 2022
- Futsal Finalissima: 2022
