= 2022 Futsal Finalissima =

Tournament details
- Host country: Argentina
- City: Buenos Aires
- Dates: 15–18 September
- Teams: 4 (from 2 confederations)
- Venue: 1 (in 1 host city)

Final positions
- Champions: Portugal (1st title)
- Runners-up: Spain
- Third place: Paraguay
- Fourth place: Argentina

Tournament statistics
- Matches played: 4
- Goals scored: 13 (3.25 per match)
- Top scorer: (Spain) Raúl Campos (2 goals)

The 2022 Futsal Finalissima (Spanish: Finalissima de Futsal 2022) was the first edition of the Futsal Finalissima, an international futsal championship organised by UEFA and CONMEBOL. It took place at the Estadio Mary Terán de Weiss in Buenos Aires, Argentina, between 15 and 18 September 2022.

== Background ==
On 12 February 2020, UEFA and CONMEBOL signed a renewed memorandum of understanding meant to enhance cooperation between the two organisations. As part of the agreement, a joint UEFA–CONMEBOL committee examined the possibility of staging European–South American intercontinental matches, for both men's and women's football and across various age groups. On 15 December 2021, UEFA and CONMEBOL again signed a renewed memorandum of understanding lasting until 2028, which included specific provisions on opening a joint office in London and the potential organisation of various football events.

On 2 June 2022, the day after staging the 2022 Finalissima, CONMEBOL and UEFA announced a series of new events between teams from the two confederations. This included a four-team tournament between the top teams from the 2022 Copa América de Futsal and UEFA Futsal Euro 2022, taking place in Buenos Aires, Argentina, between 15 and 18 September 2022.

== Teams ==
The two-best teams from each confederation qualified for the tournament, but as all Russian teams were suspended from international competition by FIFA and UEFA due to the Russian invasion of Ukraine, UEFA Futsal Euro 2022 runners-up Russia were not eligible to compete, and third-placed Spain instead were selected for the tournament.

Team	Qualified as
Argentina	2022 Copa América de Futsal winners
Paraguay	2022 Copa América de Futsal runners-up
Portugal	UEFA Futsal Euro 2022 winners
Spain	UEFA Futsal Euro 2022 third place

== Venue ==
The tournament was held at the Estadio Mary Terán de Weiss in Buenos Aires. The Movistar Arena, also located in Buenos Aires, was originally announced as the venue for the tournament on 2 June 2022. However, the venue was switched on 30 August 2022.

Buenos Aires	2022 Futsal Finalissima is located in Argentina
Estadio Mary Terán de Weiss	2022 Futsal Finalissima is located in Argentina
Capacity: 15,500	2022 Futsal Finalissima is located in Argentina

== Matches ==
The tournament featured two semi-finals, a third place play-off and a final. The semi-final fixtures were determined based on the teams' performance in their continental tournament, with the champion of each confederation facing the non-champion of the other confederation.

All times are local, ART (UTC−3).

=== Bracket ===
Semi-finals
15 September – Buenos Aires
Argentina	0
Spain	3
15 September – Buenos Aires
Portugal	2
Paraguay	1

Final
18 September – Buenos Aires
Spain	1 (2)
Portugal (p.s.o.)	1 (4)
Third place play-off
18 September – Buenos Aires
Argentina	2
Paraguay	3

=== Semi-finals ===
15 September 2022
17:00

Portugal	2–1	Paraguay
Pany Varela 29'40"; G. González 33'24" (o.g.)	Report	Ozuna 17'04"

Estadio Mary Terán de Weiss, Buenos Aires
Referee: Henrry Gutiérrez (Bolivia), Ricardo Messa (Brazil)

15 September 2022
19:45

Argentina	0–3	Spain
	Report	Raúl Campos 6'33", 15'18"; Plana 40'59"

Estadio Mary Terán de Weiss, Buenos Aires
Referee: Gean Telles (Brazil), Yuri García (Colombia)

=== Third place play-off ===
18 September 2022
14:00

Argentina	2–3	Paraguay
Borruto 12'51"; Brandi 27'36"	Report	Rejala 8'31"; Mareco 9'34": Báez 25'28"

Estadio Mary Terán de Weiss, Buenos Aires
Attendance: 5,000

=== Final ===
18 September 2022
16:45

Spain	1–1 (a.e.t.)	Portugal
Mellado 19'11"	Report	Jesus 27'18"
Penalties
Lozano (penalty scored); Chino (penalty missed); Mellado (penalty scored); Raúl Campos (penalty missed)	2–4	(penalty scored) Bruno Coelho; (penalty scored) André Coelho; (penalty scored) Pany Varela; (penalty scored) Tomás Paçó

Estadio Mary Terán de Weiss, Buenos Aires

== Goalscorers ==
There were 13 goals scored in 4 matches, for an average of 3.25 goals per match.

2 goals

- (Spain) Raúl Campos

1 goal

- (Argentina) Cristian Borruto
- (Argentina) Alan Brandi
- (Paraguay) Arnaldo Báez
- (Paraguay) Julio Mareco
- (Paraguay) Antonio Ozuna
- (Paraguay) Richard Rejala
- (Portugal) Afonso Jesus
- (Portugal) Pany Varela
- (Spain) Miguel Mellado
- (Spain) Dídac Plana

1 own goal

- (Paraguay) Giovanni González (against Portugal)
