= Lúcio Rocha =

Portuguese futsal player (born 2004)

Personal information
- Full name: Lúcio Gonçalo Silva Rocha
- Date of birth: 5 May 2004 (age 22)
- Place of birth: Porto, Portugal
- Height: 1.72 m (5 ft 8 in)
- Position: Winger

Team information
- Current team: Benfica
- Number: 19

Senior career*
Years	Team	Apps	(Gls)
2019–2021	ADCR Caxinas		
2021–	Benfica		
2021–2022	→ADCR Caxinas (loan)		

International career
2023	Portugal U19		
2024–	Portugal		
Medal record
Men's futsal
Representing Portugal
UEFA Futsal Championship
Runner-up	2026 Latvia / Lithuania / Slovenia
- * Club domestic league appearances and goals as of 24 September 2024

Lúcio Gonçalo Silva Rocha (born 5 May 2004) is a Portuguese professional futsal player who plays as a winger for Benfica and the Portuguese national team.

== Club career ==
Rocha made his senior debut with ADCR Caxinas in 2019. He then joined Benfica in 2021, although he was loaned to ADCR Caxinas in the 2021–22 season. Returning to Benfica, he won the Taça de Portugal and the Taça da Liga in the 2022–23 season. His club also won the Supertaça de Portugal in 2023.

== International career ==
On 18 August 2023, Rocha was named to the Portuguese U19 squad for the 2023 UEFA Under-19 Futsal Championship. His team defeated two-time defending champions Spain by 6–2 to secure their first title. Rocha himself was the tournament's top scorer and named best player. He was also named as part of the Team of the Tournament. He was awarded the world's Best Young Player for 2023.

Rocha was announced as being part of the senior Portuguese national team for the FIFA Futsal World Cup on 5 September 2024.

== Honours ==
Benfica

- Liga Portuguesa: 2024–25, 2025–26
- Taça de Portugal: 2022–23, 2025–26
- Taça da Liga: 2022–23, 2025–26

Portugal U-19

- UEFA Under-19 Futsal Championship: 2023
