= Arthur Guilherme =

Brazilian futsal player (born 1994)

Personal information
- Full name: Arthur Guilherme de Sousa Fortunato
- Date of birth: 16 May 1994 (age 32)
- Place of birth: Uberlândia, Brazil
- Height: 1.78 m (5 ft 10 in)
- Position: Winger

Team information
- Current team: Benfica
- Number: 10

Youth career
- FUTEL (football)
- Praia Clube
- UTC
- Praia Clube

Senior career*
Years	Team	Apps	(Gls)
–2014	Praia Clube		
2015–2016	Corinthians	6	(0)
2017–2018	Magnus Futsal	37	(18)
2018–2020	Barcelona	92	(18)
2020–	Benfica	243	(144)

International career
	Brazil	86	(32)
- * Club domestic league appearances and goals

Arthur Guilherme de Sousa Fortunato (born 16 May 1994) is a Brazilian futsal player who plays for Portuguese club Benfica and the Brazilian national futsal team as a winger.

== Honours ==
Corinthians

- Liga Nacional de Futsal: 2016
- Campeonato Paulista de Futsal: 2016

Magnus Futsal

- Supercopa do Brazil de Futsal: 2018
- Campeonato Paulista de Futsal: 2017

Barcelona

- UEFA Futsal Champions League: 2019–20
- Primera División de Futsal: 2018–19
- Copa del Rey: 2018–19, 2019-20
- Copa de España: 2019, 2020
- Supercopa de España: 2019

Benfica

- Campeonato Nacional: 2024–25, 2025–26
- Taça de Portugal: 2022–23, 2025–26
- Taça da Liga: 2022–23, 2025–26

Brazil

- FIFA Futsal World Cup: 2024
- Copa América: 2017, 2024, 2026
- Nations Cup: 2023, 2025
- CONMEBOL Futsal Evolution League: 2025
