= Diego Roncáglio =

Brazilian futsal player

Personal information
- Date of birth: 15 July 1988 (age 38)
- Place of birth: Blumenau, Brazil
- Height: 1.80 m (5 ft 11 in)
- Position: Goalkeeper

Team information
- Current team: None

Youth career
- –2007: Blumenau

Senior career*
Years	Team	Apps	(Gls)
2007–2008	Jaraguá		
2009–2010	Blumenau		
2011–2012	Joinville		
2013–2014	Blumenau		
2015	Guarapuava		
2015–2017	Kairat		
2017–2022	Benfica	136	(13)
2022–2024	Anderlecht	36	(3)
2025–	RFS		

International career
2017–	Brazil	39	(2)
- * Club domestic league appearances and goals as of 12 September 2024

Diego Roncáglio (born 15 July 1988) is a Brazilian professional futsal player who plays as a goalkeeper for Brazil national futsal team.

== Career ==
Born in the city of Blumenau, he began his career in the youth sectors of the city's club, Blumenau EC/Hering. In 2007, he was invited to become a professional by Malwee Jaraguá, and with quick adaptation, he participated in the conquests of the state championship and the 2008 Copa Libertadores. He later played again for Blumenau and Joinville, where he became champion of Santa Catarina once again. In 2015, he embarked on an international career with Kairat in Kazakhstan, where he enjoyed immediate success. Later he also had a great spell at SL Benfica and since 2022 he has been playing for RSC Anderlecht until the start of the 2024–25 season. Roncáglio stands out for his excellent ability to play with his feet, in addition to scoring goals.

Champion of the 2017 and 2024 Copa América de Futsal with the Brazil futsal team, Roncáglio was called up to play in the 2024 FIFA Futsal World Cup. But because his club Anderlecht did not let him take part in the pre-tournament training camp in Brazil, Roncáglio decided to buy himself back from the team for €20 000 (c. $21400, R$120 000). As it turned out, he became the World Champion at that event.

It was until the end of 2024 when he stayed without any club when he would join a Brazilian side Minas. Although, the Latvian club RFS from Riga re-bought his contract and signed him instead.

== Honours ==
Jaraguá

- Copa Libertadores de Futsal: 2008
- Taça Brasil de Futsal: 2008
- Campeonato Catarinense de Futsal: 2008

Joinville

- Taça Brasil de Futsal: 2011
- Campeonato Catarinense de Futsal: 2012

Kairat

- Kazakhstani Futsal Championship: 2014–15, 2015–16, 2016–17
- Kazakhstan Cup: 2014–15, 2015–16, 2016–17

Benfica

- Campeonato Nacional da I Divisão de Futsal: 2018–19
- Taça da Liga de Futsal: 2017–18, 2018–19

Anderlecht

- Belgian Futsal Division 1: 2022–23, 2023–24
- Belgian Futsal Cup: 2022–23, 2023–24

RFS

- Baltic Cup: 2025

Brazil

- FIFA Futsal World Cup: 2024
- Copa América de Futsal: 2017, 2024
