= Futsal Finalissima =

- Organiser(s): CONMEBOL; UEFA
- Founded: 2022; 4 years ago
- Region: South America; Europe
- Teams: 4
- Current champions: Spain (1st title)
- Most championships: Spain; Portugal (1 title each)
- Website: uefa.com/futsalfinalissima
- 2022 Futsal Finalissima

The Futsal Finalissima (Spanish: Finalissima de Futsal) is a quadrennial futsal competition organised by CONMEBOL and UEFA. The tournament is contested by the top two teams of the South American and European futsal championships for men's national teams, the Copa América de Futsal and UEFA Futsal Championship, respectively. The competition was launched in 2022 as part of a renewed partnership between CONMEBOL and UEFA.

== History ==
On 12 February 2020, UEFA and CONMEBOL signed a renewed memorandum of understanding meant to enhance cooperation between the two organisations. As part of the agreement, a joint UEFA–CONMEBOL committee examined the possibility of staging European–South American intercontinental matches, for both men's and women's football and across various age groups. On 15 December 2021, UEFA and CONMEBOL again signed a renewed memorandum of understanding lasting until 2028, which included specific provisions on opening a joint office in London and the potential organisation of various football events.

On 2 June 2022, the day after staging the 2022 Finalissima, CONMEBOL and UEFA announced a series of new events between teams from the two confederations. This included a tournament between the winners of South America's Copa América de Futsal and the winners of Europe's UEFA Futsal Championship. The first edition took place in Buenos Aires, Argentina, between 15 and 18 September 2022.

== Results ==
Keys

- aet: after extra time
- p: penalty shoot-out

Ed.	Year	Host	Final			Third place game		
Ed.	Year	Host	(gold) Champions	Score	(silver) Runners-up	(bronze) Third place	Score	Fourth place
I.	2022	Argentina	Portugal	1–1 (4–2 p)	Spain	Paraguay	3–2	Argentina
II.	2026	Brazil	Spain	3–0	Brazil	Argentina	3–1	Portugal

== Performances ==
=== By nation ===
Team	Winners	Runners-up	Third place	Fourth place
Spain	1 (2026)	1 (2022)	—	—
Portugal	1 (2022)	—	—	1 (2026)
Brazil	—	1 (2026)	—	—
Argentina	—	—	1 (2026)	1 (2022)
Paraguay	—	—	1 (2022)	—

=== By confederation ===
Results by confederation
Confederation	Winners	Runners-up
CONMEBOL	0	1
UEFA	2	1

== See also ==
- UEFA–CONMEBOL MoU
  - Finalissima
  - Women's Finalissima
  - Futsal Finalissima
  - UEFA–CONMEBOL Club Challenge
  - Under-20 Intercontinental Cup
