= 2024 Copa América de Futsal squads =

The 2024 Copa América de Futsal is an international futsal tournament to be held in Luque, Paraguay from 2 to 10 February 2024. The ten national teams involved in the tournament were required to register a squad of up to 14 players, including at least two goalkeepers. Only players in these squads were eligible to take part in the tournament.

Each national team had to register a list of a minimum of 10 and a maximum of 14 players in the COMET system and then submit it to CONMEBOL by 15 January 2024, 18:00 PYST (UTC−3) (Regulations Article 45). Teams are only permitted to make replacements in cases of serious injuries or illness up to 24 hours before the kick-off of their first match in the competition (Regulations Article 53). Teams are also permitted to replace an injured goalkeeper with another at any time during the tournament (Regulations Article 54). All the substitutions must have the approval of the CONMEBOL Medical Commission.

CONMEBOL published the lists of the 10 national teams.

The age listed for each player is as of 2 February 2024, the first day of the tournament. A flag is included for coaches who are of a different nationality than their own national team.

== Group A ==
=== Paraguay ===
Paraguay announced their 14-man squad on 30 January 2024, On 2 February 2024, goalkeeper Gabriel Giménez withdrew from the squad due to an injury and was replaced by Ígor Insfrán.

Head coach: Carlos Chilavert

No.	Pos.	Player	DoB (Age)	Club
1	GK	Igor Insfrán	29 August 2002 (aged 21)	(Paraguay) Deportivo Humaitá
2	DF	Alan Rojas	20 October 1998 (aged 25)	(France) Sporting Paris
3	DF	Damián Mareco	4 September 1994 (aged 29)	(Spain) Córdoba Futsal
4	WG	Emerson Méndez	18 November 2001 (aged 22)	(Italy) Sporting Sala Consilina
5	WG	Daniel Ozuna	25 November 1999 (aged 24)	(Argentina) Boca Juniors
6	PV	Richard Rejala	5 February 1994 (aged 29)	(Croatia) Olmissum
7	WG	Javier Salas	22 September 1993 (aged 30)	(Italy) Napoli Futsal
8	PV	Pedro Pascottini	30 November 1998 (aged 25)	(Paraguay) Villa Hayes
9	WG	Hugo Martínez	12 January 1993 (aged 31)	(Paraguay) Olimpia
10	WG	Juan Gómez Salas	20 October 1990 (aged 33)	(Italy) Sporting Sala Consilina
11	WG	Francisco Martínez	12 January 1993 (aged 31)	(Slovenia) Dobovec
12	GK	Giovanni González	5 May 1995 (aged 28)	(Paraguay) Cerro Porteño
13	PV	Aldo Amarilla	31 December 1994 (aged 29)	(France) Sporting Paris
14	WG	Jorge Espinoza	22 November 1993 (aged 30)	(Paraguay) Cerro Porteño

=== Colombia ===
Colombia announced a preliminary squad of 16 players on 9 January 2024. Colombia's final 14-man squad was only confirmed at the start of the tournament, with Brayan Zapata and Ronald Solórzano being dropped from the preliminary squad.

Head coach: Roberto Bruno

No.	Pos.	Player	DoB (Age)	Club
1	GK	Andrés Mattos	8 May 1994 (aged 29)	(Colombia) Independiente Barranquilla
2	GK	Esteban Sánchez	21 April 1994 (aged 29)	(Bolivia) Fantasmas
3	DF	Angelo Santofimio	14 July 2004 (aged 19)	(Colombia) Sergio Arboleda University
4	DF	Julian Pardo	21 April 1999 (aged 24)	(France) Paris ACASA
5	WG	Felipe Echavarría	2 November 1992 (aged 31)	(Croatia) MNK Futsal Pula
6	PV	Sebastián Sánchez	3 September 1995 (aged 28)	(Kosovo) FC Liqeni
7	PV	Jhonatan Giraldo	21 March 1988 (aged 35)	(Bolivia) Concepción
8	WG	Harrison Santos	1 June 2006 (aged 17)	(Spain) Barcelona
9	WG	Camilo Gómez	11 March 1985 (aged 38)	(France) Montpellier MF
10	WG	Angellot Caro	3 December 1988 (aged 35)	(Brazil) Magnus Futsal
11	WG	Jorge Cuervo	25 August 1988 (aged 35)	(Colombia) Independiente Barranquilla
12	PV	Eduardo Riaño	21 March 1999 (aged 24)	(Spain) Lauburu KE Ibarra
13	PV	Luis Posada	3 July 1993 (aged 30)	(Colombia) Mosquera Corprodep
14	PV	Wilmar Ramírez	23 January 1990 (aged 34)	(France) Goal Futsal Club

=== Venezuela ===
Venezuela announced a preliminary squad of 21 players on 8 January 2024. The final 14-man squad was announced on 28 January 2024,

Head coach: Robinson Romero

No.	Pos.	Player	DoB (Age)	Club
1	GK	Carlos Vásquez	3 March 1989 (aged 34)	(Venezuela) Centauros de Caracas
2	DF	Carlos Sanz	21 March 1996 (aged 27)	(Venezuela) Centauros de Caracas
3	PV	Wilmer Cabarcas	15 September 1994 (aged 29)	(Italy) Vitulano Drugstore Manfredonia
4	DF	Greydelvid Terán	24 November 1991 (aged 32)	(Venezuela) Centauros de Caracas
5	WG	Saimond Francia	22 February 2004 (aged 19)	(Venezuela) Centauros de Caracas
6	WG	Víctor Carreño	3 October 1994 (aged 29)	(Venezuela) Centauros de Caracas
7	WG	Maikel Torres	24 November 1999 (aged 24)	(Venezuela) Centauros de Caracas
8	WG	Jean Trujillo	8 September 1997 (aged 26)	(France) Nantes Métropole
9	WG	Carlos Vento	27 February 1997 (aged 26)	(Venezuela) Centauros de Caracas
10	DF	Rafael Morillo	20 October 1992 (aged 31)	(Venezuela) Centauros de Caracas
11	PV	Eneiker Morales	28 October 1993 (aged 30)	(Venezuela) Centauros de Caracas
12	GK	José Villalobos	26 November 1991 (aged 32)	(Venezuela) Monagas
13	WG	Milton Francia	25 May 1996 (aged 27)	(Venezuela) Mundo Factory
14	PV	Kevin Briceño	24 August 2000 (aged 23)	(Venezuela) Centauros de Caracas

=== Ecuador ===
The final squad consists of 14 players.

1. Emerson Stiven Lopez Mantuano
2. Steven Wellington Soria Aviles
3. Luis Eduardo Ramirez Bolaño
4. Bryan Edison Salazar Moran
5. Bryan Erick Montaño Estupiñan
6. Miguel Angel Quijije Palacios
7. Eddie Andres Leon Bravo
8. Alejandro Daniel Nazareno Castillo
9. Jordan Jose Mercado Estupiñan
10. Jimmy Isidoro Espinales Ramirez
11. Diego Antonio Bermudez Vives
12. Franklin Stalin Pavon Salvatierra
13. Dalember Johao Segura Olmedo
14. Felipe Andres Cortez Nazareno

=== Chile ===
Chile announced a preliminary squad of 19 players on 15 January 2024. The final 14-man squad was announced on 30 January 2024

Head coach: (Argentina) Ignacio Cabral

No.	Pos.	Player	DoB (Age)	Club
1	GK	Patricio Berríos	31 May 2004 (aged 17)	(Chile) Colo-Colo
2	WG	Fabian Vásquez	30 December 1994 (aged 27)	(Chile) Santiago Wanderers
3	WG	Alan Morán	3 September 2002 (aged 19)	(Chile) Magallanes
4	DF	Bernardo Araya	5 June 1993 (aged 28)	(Brazil) Umuarama Futsal
5	DF	Joel González	17 September 1994 (aged 27)	(Argentina) Gimnasia y Esgrima (LP)
6	WG	Joshua Barrios	28 May 2000 (aged 21)	(Chile) Deportes Recoleta
7	WG	Sebastián Figueroa	9 January 1995 (aged 27)	(Chile) Santiago Wanderers
8	WG	Renato Martínez-Conde	27 December 1993 (aged 28)	(Argentina) Ferro Carril Oeste
9	PV	Javier Fuentealba	9 November 2001 (aged 20)	(Argentina) Newell's Old Boys
10	WG	Nicolás Lagos	7 December 1999 (aged 22)	(Argentina) Ferro Carril Oeste
11	PV	Cristian Arredondo	16 July 1990 (aged 31)	(Chile) Deportes Recoleta
12	GK	Bairont Morales	14 May 2006 (aged 15)	(Chile) Audax Italiano
13	PV	Francisco Feliú	24 July 1992 (aged 29)	(Chile) Santiago Wanderers
14	DF	Bilan De La Paz	16 November 1995 (aged 26)	(Argentina) Ferro Carril Oeste

== Group B ==
=== Argentina ===
Argentina announced their 14-man squad on 26 January 2024.

Head coach: Matías Lucuix

No.	Pos.	Player	DoB (Age)	Club
1	GK	Nicolás Sarmiento	3 December 1992 (aged 31)	(Spain) Noia
2	WG	Lucas Tripodi	18 June 1994 (aged 29)	(Spain) Ribera Navarra
3	WG	Ángel Claudino	8 December 1995 (aged 28)	(Spain) Ribera Navarra
4	DF	Lucas Bolo	12 March 1992 (aged 31)	(Italy) Napoli Futsal
5	WG	Lucas Flores	14 November 1996 (aged 27)	(Argentina) Boca Juniors
6	DF	Sebastián Corso	12 February 1992 (aged 31)	(Spain) Industrias Santa Coloma
7	PV	Matías Rosa	18 September 1995 (aged 28)	(Spain) Jaén Paraíso Interior
8	DF	Santiago Basile	25 July 1988 (aged 35)	(Argentina) Boca Juniors
9	PV	Cristian Borruto	7 May 1987 (aged 36)	(Italy) Napoli Futsal
10	WG	Constantino Vaporaki	6 January 1990 (aged 34)	(Latvia) Riga Futsal
11	PV	Alan Brandi	24 November 1987 (aged 36)	(Spain) Jaén Paraíso Interior
12	GK	Matías Starna	26 January 1999 (aged 25)	(Spain) Peñiscola FS
13	WG	Luciano Gauna	24 February 2001 (aged 22)	(Spain) Peñiscola FS
14	DF	Pablo Taborda (captain)	3 September 1986 (aged 37)	(Spain) Jaén Paraíso Interior

=== Brazil ===
Brazil announced a squad of 16 players on 4 January 2024. Brazil's final 14-man squad was later announced by CONMEBOL, with goalkeeper Carlos Espíndola and winger Matheus Rodrigues being ruled out from the squad previously presented.

Head coach: Marquinhos Xavier

No.	Pos.	Player	DoB (Age)	Club
1	GK	Guitta	11 June 1987 (aged 36)	(Russia) MFK Ukhta
2	GK	Diego Roncáglio	15 July 1988 (aged 35)	(Belgium) Anderlecht
3	DF	Neguinho	12 July 2000 (aged 23)	(Spain) Palma Futsal
4	DF	Marlon	28 December 1987 (aged 36)	(Spain) ElPozo Murcia
5	WG	Diego Nunes	31 October 1994 (aged 29)	(Portugal) Benfica
6	WG	Leandro Lino	25 July 1995 (aged 28)	(Brazil) Magnus Futsal
7	WG	Dyego Zuffo (captain)	5 August 1989 (aged 34)	(Spain) Barcelona
8	WG	Marcênio	5 October 1987 (aged 36)	(Brazil) Jaraguá
9	PV	Vinícius Rocha	30 March 1995 (aged 28)	(Portugal) Benfica
10	PV	Pito	6 November 1991 (aged 32)	(Spain) Barcelona
11	DF	Gadeia	14 June 1988 (aged 35)	(Spain) Palma Futsal
12	WG	Arthur Guilherme	16 May 1994 (aged 29)	(Portugal) Benfica
13	PV	Rafa Santos	25 September 1990 (aged 33)	(Spain) ElPozo Murcia
14	WG	Felipe Valério	8 July 1993 (aged 30)	(Spain) ElPozo Murcia

=== Uruguay ===
Uruguay announced their 14-man squad on 19 January 2024. On 29 January 2024, winger Alejandro Aunchayna was ruled out from the squad due to an injury and was replaced by Diego Defiore.

Head coach: Gabriel de Simone

No.	Pos.	Player	DoB (Age)	Club
1	GK	Christian Gaitán	8 October 1992 (aged 31)	(Uruguay) Nacional
2	WG	Nicolás Lamas	31 March 1994 (aged 29)	(Italy) Bulldog Capurso
3	DF	Maximiliano Navarro	1 July 1991 (aged 32)	(Uruguay) Urupan
4	WG	Leandro Ataídes	15 April 1993 (aged 30)	(Uruguay) Urupan
5	WG	Agustín Sosa	23 February 1995 (aged 28)	(Italy) Prato
6	WG	Camilo García	6 July 2001 (aged 22)	(Argentina) Independiente
7	WG	Yhordi Segui	4 July 1998 (aged 25)	(Argentina) Independiente
8	PV	Ignacio Salgués	25 February 1989 (aged 34)	(Argentina) Boca Juniors
9	DF	Richard Catardo	15 December 1988 (aged 35)	(Uruguay) Peñarol
10	WG	Pablo Ibarra	21 February 1995 (aged 28)	(Spain) Wanapix Sala 10
11	WG	Brandon Diaz	10 May 1996 (aged 27)	(Uruguay) Peñarol
12	GK	Mathías Fernández	5 October 1993 (aged 30)	(Uruguay) Peñarol
13	DF	Diego Defiore	9 February 1993 (aged 30)	(Argentina) Pinocho
14	PV	Nicolás Martínez	24 May 1999 (aged 24)	(Argentina) Independiente

=== Bolivia ===
The final squad consists of 14 players.

1. Carlos Fabian Vargas Lopez
2. Ramiro Brian Mendivil Fernandez
3. Ruben Dario Sandi Ortiz
4. Carlos Junior Ramos Soliz
5. Alejandro Javier Choqueticlla Llampa
6. Saul Dante Gareca Chambilla
7. Alan Daniel Valda Echalar
8. Joel Guzman Simon
9. Yderf Erwin Yucra Ledezma
10. Miguel Angel Padilla Via
11. Bruno Junior Tecos Turis Mamani
12. Jose Fernando Teran
13. Horacio Rodrigo Miranda Gomez
14. Marco Ugarte Soto

=== Peru ===
Peru announced their 14-man squad on 30 January 2024,

Head coach: Francisco Melgar

No.	Pos.	Player	DoB (Age)	Club
1	GK	Jesús Herrera	25 July 1996 (aged 27)	(Peru) Panta Walon
2	WG	Denilson Zegarra	6 October 2005 (aged 18)	(Peru) Panta Walon
3		Luis Pier Ramos	4 June 1991 (aged 32)	(Peru) Universitario
4		Elvis Cabrera	19 October 1998 (aged 25)	(Peru) Academia Hermanos Rey
5	PV	Hugo Barrantes	27 November 1991 (aged 32)	(Peru) Universitario
6	WG	Jorge Aguilar	6 June 1992 (aged 31)	(Peru) Panta Walon
7	WG	Juan Pablo Saravia	8 December 1990 (aged 33)	(Peru) Panta Walon
8	DF	Samuel Angulo	17 October 1988 (aged 35)	(Peru) Panta Walon
9	PV	Toni Alvarado	17 June 1986 (aged 37)	(Peru) Universitario
10	WG	Renzo Ramírez	19 November 1992 (aged 31)	(Peru) Panta Walon
11	WG	Junior Ulloa	8 February 2000 (aged 23)	(Peru) Panta Walon
12	GK	Eder Pérez	18 August 1992 (aged 31)	(Peru) Panta Walon
13		Israel Solano	22 April 1995 (aged 28)	(Peru) Panta Walon
14	WG	Xavier Tavera	17 July 1990 (aged 33)	(Peru) Panta Walon
