= Brazil 76–0 Timor-Leste =

Futsal match

2006 Lusophony Games
- Event: Futsal
Brazil	Timor-Leste
(Brazil)	(Timor-Leste)
76	0
- Date: 13 October 2006
- Venue: Macau East Asian Games Dome, Macau
- Referee: Khairuddin Nazrul (Malaysia)

On 13 October 2006, the Brazil national futsal team and Timor-Leste national futsal team faced each other in an international futsal match that was part of the 2006 Lusophony Games, hosted that year by Macau. Brazil defeated Timor-Leste 76–0, setting a world record for largest win in an international futsal match. One of Brazil's players, Valdin, scored 20 goals, which is another record. It was Brazil's biggest margin of victory since they beat Uruguay 38–3 in the 1991 Pan American Games. Timor-Leste was coming off a 56–0 loss to Portugal, which was the previous world record.

== Background ==
Brazil was the favorite to win the Lusophony Games, while this was one of Timor-Leste's first games.

- 9 October: On the first day of competition, Angola defeated Macau 2–0, but was overshadowed by Portugal's 56–0 blowout of Timor-Leste. Portuguese Israel scored eleven goals himself, while his teammate, André Lima, scored ten goals. This was a little over one goal per minute, being the world record for four days. Brazil did not play that day.
- 10 October: In Brazil's first game, they beat Angola 7–0. Timor-Leste lost to host Macau by winning 13–4.
- 11 October: Brazil crushed Macau 27–0. Portugal defeated Angola on that day by winning 4–1.
- 12 October was a rest day.
- 13 October: Apart from the 76–0 game, Portugal beat Macau 22–0.

== Line-ups ==
Timor-Leste	Brazil
Xavier Henriques (GK)	Tiago (GK)
Januário	Leco
Octavianus	Valdin
Romário	Ari
Martins	Márcio Souza
Substitutions:	Substitutions:
Aleixo	Rogério
Fernandes	Dimas
	Carlinhos
	Tostão
	Marinho
	Wilde
	Jonas
Manager:	Manager:
Jaime Vong	PC de Oliveira

== The match ==
The match was played in the Macau East Asian Games Dome, as did all the games, at 19:00 UTC+8.

13 October 2006
19:00 UTC+8
2006 Lusophony Games

Timor-Leste	0–76	Brazil
	(Report)	Valdin (20 goals); Márcio Souza (16 goals); Dimas (13 goals); Tostão (8 goals); Wilde (5 goals); Ari (5 goals); Carlinhos (3 goals); Marinho (3 goals); Jonas; Leco; Romário (o.g.)

Macau East Asian Games Dome, Macau
Referee: Khairuddin Nazrul (Malaysia)

Brazil wanted to beat Timor-Leste by more goals than Portugal did because of goal difference. The final result was 76–0, meaning almost 2 goals per minute.

== Post-match ==
14 October: Brazil ties Portugal 1–1. It is Brazil's first goal conceded in the whole tournament. Brazil won the gold medal by goal difference. Timor-Leste loses again, to Angola, 24–3.

This is how the two countries wound up the tournament. Brazil won the gold medal, and Timor-Leste came in last.

Rank	Team	Pts	Pld	W	D	L	GF	GA	GD
1	Brazil	10	4	3	1	0	111	1	+110
5	Timor-Leste	0	4	0	0	4	7	169	−162

== Response ==
The game was talked about mostly in Brazil, Portugal and surprisingly Spain. Timor-Leste did not compete in futsal at the next Lusophony Games in 2009, hosted in Portugal.

Striker Valdin said the following about the scoring:

"We knew the weakness of the opponent and as Portugal had (scored) a lot of goals, we had to score many goals as well. The goal was (to beat) Portugal on goal difference and that's what happened..."
Translated from Portuguese

Reinaldo Simões, a member of the Brazilian delegation, said after the match,

"We needed a rout to have advantage in the game against Portugal tomorrow. That was our goal. No one was ever worried about (it). All the players worked in pursuit of goals until the score was so high that no one thought of scoring any more..."
Translated from Portuguese

Brazil then drew with Portugal 1–1.

== See also ==
- Blowout (sports)
