= Manoel Tobias =

Brazilian futsal player

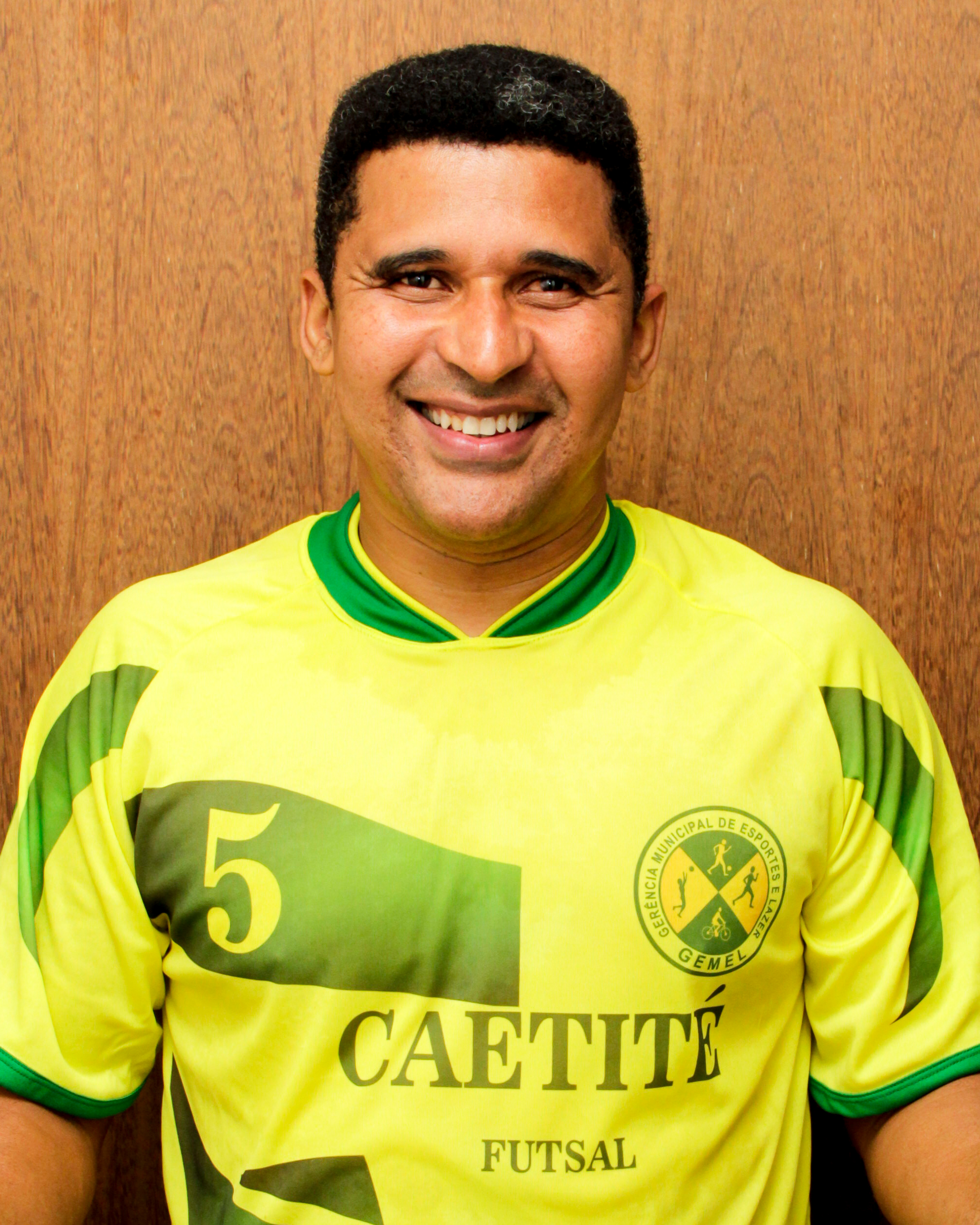
- Tobias in 2016

Personal information
- Full name: Manoel Tobias da Cruz Júnior
- Date of birth: 7 April 1971 (age 55)
- Place of birth: Salgueiro, Brazil
- Position: Defender

Senior career*
Years	Team	Apps	(Gls)
1989	Candeia		
1990	Votorantim		
1991–1992	Banfort		
1993-1994	Inpacel		
1994–1995	Enxuta		
1996–1997	Inter/Ulbra		
1998–1999	Atlético Mineiro		
2000–2001	Vasco da Gama		
2001–2002	Malwee/Jaraguá		
2002–2007	Cartagena		
2007	SC Ulbra		

International career
1992–2004	Brazil	302	(278)
Medal record
Representing Brazil
Men's Futsal
FIFA Futsal World Cup
Winner	1992 Hong Kong
Winner	1996 Spain
Runner-up	2000 Guatemala
Third place	2004 Chinese Taipei
- * Club domestic league appearances and goals

Manoel Tobias da Cruz Júnior (born 7 April 1971), commonly known as Manoel Tobias, is a former futsal player. He is a two time futsal world champion with the Brazilian team

== Honours ==
=== Clubs ===
- Fortaleza City Trophy: Champion 1992, 1993
- Pernambuco State: Champion 1990
- Champion of Paraná State: 1992, 1993
- Champion of Rio Grande do Sul State: 1994, 1995
- Brazilian Champion of State Squads 1992, 1996
- Champion of National Circuit: 1992, 1995
- Brazilian Championship:1991, 1993, 1994, 1995
- South American Club Futsal Championship: champion 1993
- Intercontinental Futsal Cup: champion 1996,1998
- Belo Horizonte Metropolitan: Champion 1998, 1999
- Campeonato Mineiro de Futsal:1998, 1999
- Liga Futsal:1996, 1999, 2000
- Taça Brasil de Futsal:1991,1995, 2000
- Campeonato do Rio de Janeiro de Futsal: 2000
- Campeonato Carioca Metropolitano: 2000
- Copa Rio/São Paulo/Minas: 2000, 2001

=== Brazilian Squad ===
- Pan American Cup: Champion 1991
- South American Qualificacion: Champion 1992,1996, 2000
- Mundialito: Champion 1995,1996,1998, 2001, 2002
- Rio de Janeiro Cup: Champion 1997,1998
- Copa América de Futsal: champion 1995, 1997, 1998, 1999
- FIFA Futsal World Cup: champion 1992, 1996
- Pré-Mundial de Futsal:2004
- Latin Cup: 2003
- Tigers 5 – Singapore: 1999, 2001
- Egypt Tournament: 2002
- Thailand Tournament: 2003
- Odesur Games:2002

=== Individual ===
- 3x Best Player of the World: 2000, 2001, 2002
- 2x Best Player on the FIFA Futsal World Cup: 1996, 2000
- 2X Topscorers Fifa Futsal World Cup:1996 (14 goals), 2000 (19 goals)
- FIFA Futsal World Cup goals: 43 goals in 4 editions
