= Leandro Lino =

Brazilian futsal player

Personal information
- Full name: Leandro Lino dos Santos
- Date of birth: 25 July 1995 (age 31)
- Place of birth: Franco da Rocha, Brazil
- Height: 1.75 m (5 ft 9 in)
- Position: Winger

Team information
- Current team: Magnus Futsal
- Number: 17

Youth career
- 2013–2015: Corinthians

Senior career*
Years	Team	Apps	(Gls)
2015–2016	Corinthians		
2017–	Magnus Futsal	35	(9)

International career^{‡}
2016–	Brazil		
- * Club domestic league appearances and goals as of 00:00, 27 October 2018 (UTC) ‡ National team caps and goals as of 00:00, 27 October 2018 (UTC)

Leandro Lino dos Santos (born 25 July 1995) is a Brazilian futsal player who plays as a winger for Magnus Futsal and the Brazilian national futsal team.

== Honours ==
Brazil

- FIFA Futsal World Cup: 2024
