= Rafa Santos (futsal player) =

Brazilian futsal player

Personal information
- Full name: Rafael dos Santos
- Date of birth: 25 September 1990 (age 36)
- Place of birth: São Bernardo do Campo, Brazil
- Height: 1.79 m (5 ft 10 in)
- Position: Forward

Team information
- Current team: ElPozo Murcia

Senior career*
Years	Team	Apps	(Gls)
2011	São Paulo/Marília		
2012	Wimpro Guarulhos		
2013	São José-SP		
2014	Iberia Tbilisi		
2014	Brasil Kirin		
2015–2017	Carlos Barbosa		
2017–2020	Nagoya Oceans	36	(30)
2020–	ElPozo Murcia	107	(60)

International career
2017–	Brazil	39	(14)
- * Club domestic league appearances and goals as of 12 September 2024

Rafael dos Santos (born 25 September 1990) is a Brazilian professional futsal player who plays as a forward for the Spanish club ElPozo Murcia.

== Career ==
Futsal player during his childhood, Santos gave up his career to work at a cargo terminal. He played professionally for São José Futsal, Ibero Stars of Georgia, Brasil Kirin, until arriving at Carlos Barbosa, the team for which he established himself. Represents the Brazil futsal team since 2017. In 2020 he signed a three-year contract with ElPozo Murcia, and in March 2023, renewed for three more seasons.

Champion of the 2017 and 2024 editions of the Copa América de Futsal with the Brazil, Santos was called up to play in the 2024 FIFA Futsal World Cup.

== Honours ==
Carlos Barbosa

- Taça Brasil de Futsal: 2016
- Supercopa do Brasil de Futsal: 2017

Nagoya Oceans

- F.League: 2017–18, 2018–19, 2019–20
- All Japan Futsal Championship: 2018, 2019
- F.League Ocean Cup: 2018, 2019

Brazil

- FIFA Futsal World Cup: 2024
- Copa América de Futsal: 2017, 2024
- Futsal Nations Cup: 2023
