= Marcel Marques =

Brazilian futsal player

Personal information
- Full name: Marcel de Mendonça Marques
- Date of birth: 26 July 1996 (age 30)
- Place of birth: São Paulo, Brazil
- Height: 1.73 m (5 ft 8 in)
- Position: Winger

Team information
- Current team: El Pozo Murcia
- Number: 11

Youth career
- –2015: Corinthians

Senior career*
Years	Team	Apps	(Gls)
2016	Corinthians	23	(4)
2017–2018	Sorocaba	43	(19)
2019–	Inter FS	29	(5)
2020–	El Pozo Murcia	188	(101)
Total		283	(129)

International career^{‡}
2016–	Brazil	61	(31)
- * Club domestic league appearances and goals as of 00:00, 27 October 2018 (UTC) ‡ National team caps and goals as of 00:00, 27 October 2018 (UTC)

Marcel de Mendonça Marques (born 26 July 1996) is a Brazilian futsal player who plays as a winger for ElPozo Murcia and the Brazilian national futsal team.

== Career ==
Marcel Marques started his career in his hometown team, Corinthians, but soon joined Sorocaba where he stayed for two years before moving to Spanish futsal powerhouse Inter FS.

== Honours ==
National team

- FIFA Futsal World Cup: 2024 - (champion)

Individual

- 2024 FIFA Futsal World Cup Golden Boot: 10 goals
