= Jesús Gordillo =

Spanish futsal player (born 2001)

Personal information
- Full name: Jesús García del Pino Gordillo
- Date of birth: 8 February 2001 (age 25)
- Place of birth: Toledo, Spain
- Position: Pivot

Team information
- Current team: Tyumen
- Number: 39

Youth career
- 2016–2019: Moprisala
- 2019–2020: Palma Futsal

Senior career*
Years	Team	Apps	(Gls)
2020–2025	Palma Futsal		
2020–2021	→ Calviá		
2025–	Tyumen		

International career^{‡}
2019–2020	Spain U19		
2022–	Spain	16	(3)
Medal record
Men's futsal
Representing Spain
UEFA Under-19 Futsal Championship
Winner	2019 Riga
Representing Spain
UEFA Futsal Championship
Winner	2026 Latvia / Lithuania / Slovenia
- * Club domestic league appearances and goals as of 30 December 2025 ‡ National team caps and goals as of 19 August 2025

Jesús García del Pino Gordillo (born 8 February 2001) is a Spanish professional futsal player who plays as a pivot for Tyumen and the Spain national team.

== Club career ==
Born into a very large family, Gordillo began playing five-a-side football at Club Deportivo Moprisala at the age of 5 until, after completing his high school studies, he moved to the youth sector of Palma. In the summer of 2020, Gordillo was loaned to Calviá, playing in the Segunda División B. The following season he helped the satellite team to gain promotion to Segunda División and also made his Primera División debut with the Palma first team. In the summer of 2022, Gordillo was added to the Mallorcan first team on a permanent basis. During his time with the club, Palma won the UEFA Futsal Champions League three consecutive times. In July 2025, he moved to MFK Tyumen.

== International career ==
On 14 September 2019, with Spain's under-19 team, Gordillo won the first edition of the UEFA Under-19 Championship.

On 7 October 2022, Gordillo made his debut for the senior national team, but after just 9 minutes, he suffered an injury that kept him out for the rest of the season. He was initially excluded from the squad for the 2024 FIFA Futsal World Cup, but he was recalled just before the debut of the Red Furies to replace the injured César Velasco.

In 2026, Gordillo was part of the Spanish squad that won the UEFA Futsal Euro.

== Honours ==
Palma Futsal

- UEFA Futsal Champions League: 2022–23, 2023–24, 2024–25

Spain U-19

- UEFA Under-19 Futsal Championship: 2019

Spain

- UEFA Futsal Championship: 2026
