= Futsal at the 2010 South American Games =

Futsal at the 2010 South American Games in Medellín was held from March 20 to March 26. All games were played in Medellín, Colombia and the Gold medal was won by Brazil

== Medal summary ==
| Rank | Nation | Gold | Silver | Bronze | Total |
|---|---|---|---|---|---|
| 1 | Brazil (BRA) | 1 | 0 | 0 | 1 |
| 2 | Uruguay (URU) | 0 | 1 | 0 | 1 |
| 3 | Colombia (COL) | 0 | 0 | 1 | 1 |
| Totals (3 entries) | | 1 | 1 | 1 | 3 |
