= Felipe Valério =

Brazilian futsal player

Personal information
- Full name: Felipe Valério Paschoal
- Date of birth: 8 July 1993 (age 33)
- Place of birth: Suzano, Brazil
- Height: 1.77 m (5 ft 10 in)
- Positions: Winger; defender

Team information
- Current team: Sporting Clube de Portugal
- Number: 14

Youth career
- –2013: Grêmio Mogiano

Senior career*
Years	Team	Apps	(Gls)
2013–2014	Grêmio Mogiano		
2015–2018	Carlos Barbosa		
2019–	ElPozo Murcia		

International career
2017–	Brazil		
- * Club domestic league appearances and goals as of 00:00, 12 March 2019 (UTC)

Felipe Valério Paschoal (born 8 July 1993) is a Brazilian futsal player who plays as a winger for ElPozo Murcia and the Brazilian national futsal team.

== Honours ==
Brazil

- FIFA Futsal World Cup: 2024
