= Willian Dorn =

Brazilian futsal player (born 1994)

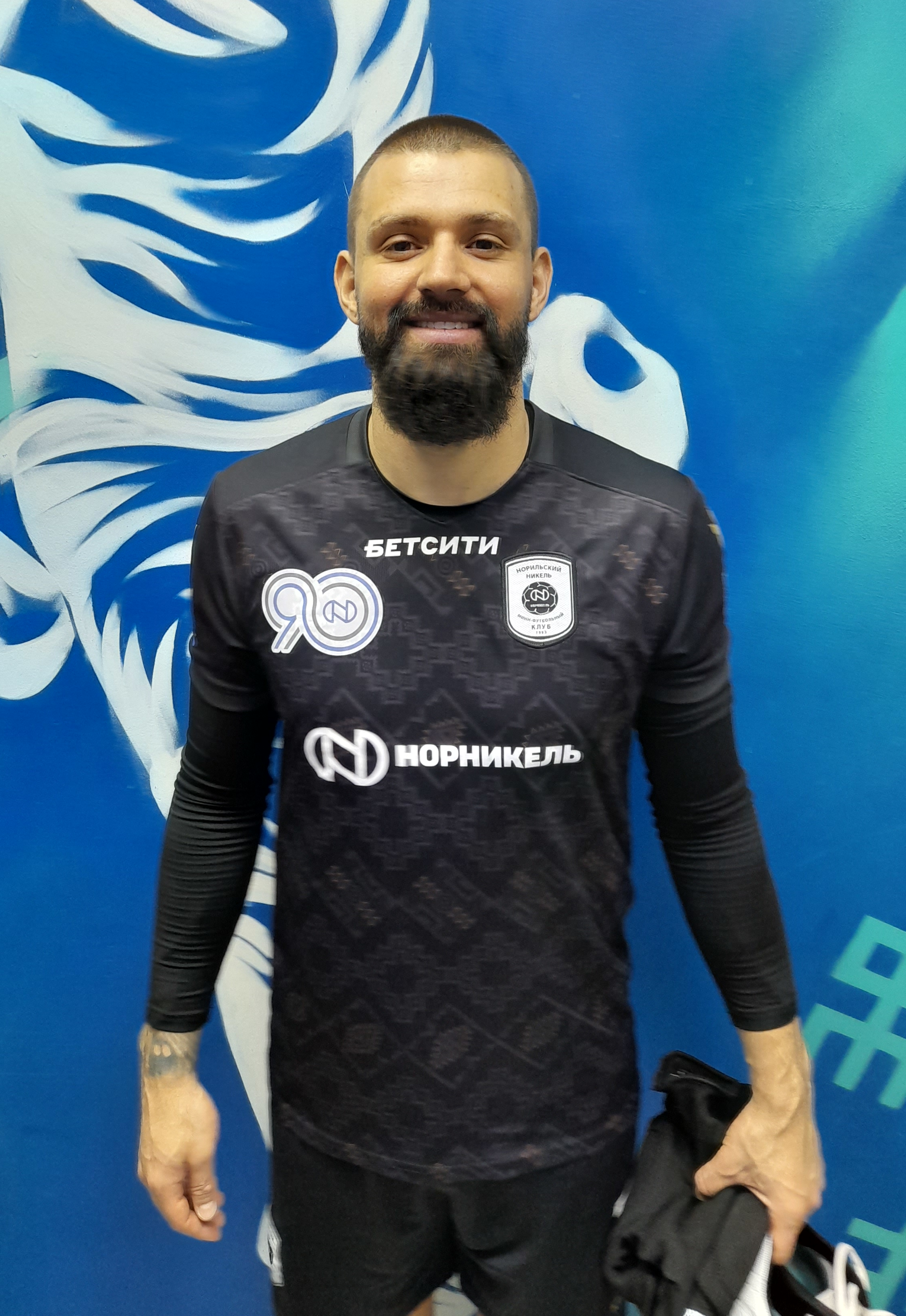

Personal information
- Full name: Willian Felipe Dorn
- Date of birth: 17 December 1994 (age 31)
- Place of birth: Jaraguá do Sul, Brazil
- Height: 1.84 m (6 ft 0 in)
- Position: Goalkeeper

Team information
- Current team: Norilsk Nickel

Senior career*
Years	Team	Apps	(Gls)
2013–2023	Joinville	158	(9)
2024–	Norilsk Nickel		

International career
2021–	Brazil	12	(0)
- * Club domestic league appearances and goals as of 12 September 2024

Willian Felipe Dorn (born 17 December 1994) is a Brazilian professional futsal player who plays as a goalkeeper for the Russian club MFK Norilsk Nickel and the Brazil national team.

== Career ==
Born in Jaraguá do Sul, Dorn arrived at Joinville Futsal at the age of 18 in 2013, and over the course of 11 seasons at the club he became an idol, accumulating 158 appearances and scoring 9 goals, winning important titles for the team such as the National League in 2017. In 2023 was voted the best futsal goalkeeper in the world by Futsal Planet magazine.

In 2024 he transferred to MFK Norilsk Nickel in Russia.

Dorn represented the Brazil futsal team in two FIFA Futsal World Cups, in 2021 and 2024.

== Personal life ==
Willian is cousin of the also futsal players Leo Jaraguá and Daniel Rosa.

== Honours ==
Joinville

- Liga Nacional de Futsal: 2017
- Taça Brasil de Futsal: 2017, 2022
- Supercopa do Brasil de Futsal: 2023

Brazil

- FIFA Futsal World Cup: 2024
- Futsal Nations Cup: 2023
- Grand Prix de Futsal: 2018

Individual

- Futsal Planet best futsal goalkeeper: 2023
- 2024 FIFA Futsal World Cup Golden Glove
