= Marquinhos Xavier =

Brazil football manager

Personal information
- Full name: Marcos Xavier Andrade
- Date of birth: April 3, 1974 (age 52)
- Place of birth: Joinville, Brazil

Team information
- Current team: Brazil (head coach)

Managerial career
- Years: Team
- 2005-2006: Palmas
- 2006-2007: Marcianise
- 2007: Toledo
- 2008: John Deere/Horizontina
- 2009-2014: Copagril
- 2015-2019: Carlos Barbosa
- 2017-present: Brazil
- ‡ National team caps and goals as of 25 September 2022

Marcos Xavier Andrade (born 3 April 1974), commonly known as Marquinhos Xavier, is a Brazilian futsal coach. He is a coach of Brazil national futsal team.

== Honours ==
Brazil

- FIFA Futsal World Cup: 2024
