= Neguinho (futsal player, born 2000) =

Brazilian futsal player

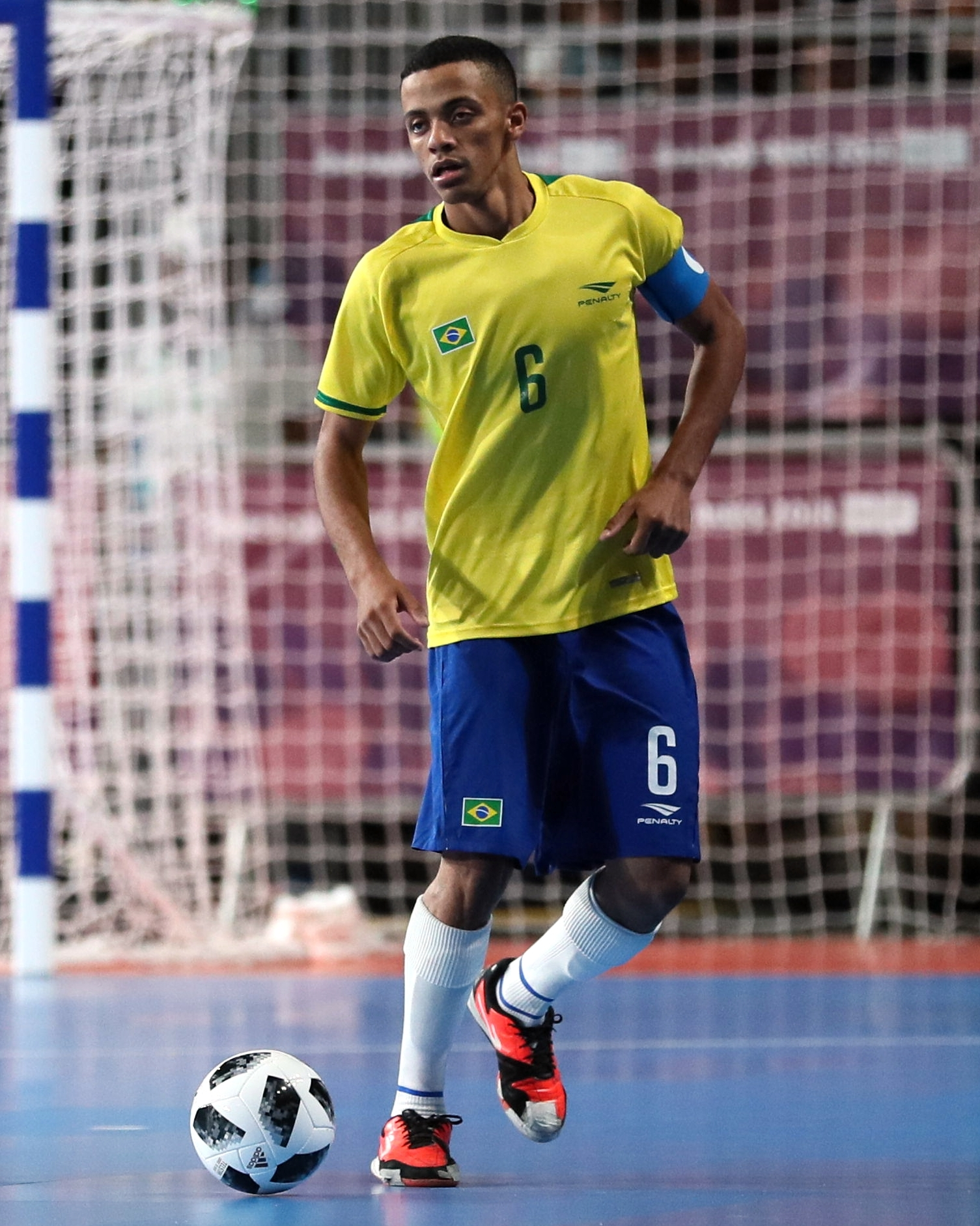

Personal information
- Full name: João Victor Alves Sena
- Date of birth: 12 July 2000 (age 26)
- Place of birth: São Paulo, Brazil
- Height: 1.73 m (5 ft 8 in)
- Position: Defender

Team information
- Current team: Barcelona

Youth career
- 2016–2018: Juventus-SP (Association football)

Senior career*
Years	Team	Apps	(Gls)
2019–2021	Corinthians	35	(5)
2021–2025	Palma Futsal		
2023	→ Noia		
2023	→ Ribera Navarra		
2023	→ Atlântico de Erechim	27	(19)
2024-2025	→ Palma Futsal		
2025-	Barcelona		

International career
2022–	Brazil	15	(6)
- * Club domestic league appearances and goals as of 12 September 2024

João Victor Alves Sena (born 12 July 2000), better known by the nickname Neguinho is a Brazilian professional futsal player who plays as a defender for the Spanish club FCBarcelona

== Career ==
Born in São Paulo, he was revealed by SC Corinthians futsal, the team he played for from 2019 to 2021, participating in 35 matches and scoring 5 goals. He was part of winning the Brazilian Super Cup in 2020. He transferred to Palma Futsal at the end of 2021, but without being able to establish himself, his transfer was transferred to Noia FS and Ribera Navarra FS, still in the Spanish first division. Finally, he was loaned to Atlântico de Erechim, the team with which he won the Liga Nacional Brasiliera in 2023. In 2024, back to Palma Futsal, he was part of the conquest of the 2023–24 UEFA Futsal Champions League. Before 2024–25 season he was bought by Barcelona but was loaned back to Palma Futsal.

Champion of the 2024 Copa América with the Brazilian national team, Neguinho was called up to play in the 2024 FIFA Futsal World Cup.

== Honours ==
Corinthians

- Supercopa do Brasil de Futsal: 2020

Atlântico

- Liga Nacional de Futsal: 2023

Palma Futsal

- UEFA Futsal Champions League: 2023–24, 2024–25

Brazil

- FIFA Futsal World Cup: 2024
- Copa América de Futsal: 2024
- Toulon Tournament: 2022
- Futsal Nations Cup: 2023
