= Douglas Pierrotti =

Brazilian futsal player

Douglas
Personal information
- Full name: Douglas Pierrotti
- Date of birth: 22 September 1959 (age 67)
- Place of birth: São Paulo, Brazil
- Position: Pivot

Youth career
- 1970s: Palmeiras
- 1970s: AABB

Senior career*
Years	Team	Apps	(Gls)
1979–1986	Gercan		
1986–1988	Transbrasil		
1989	Trilhoteiro		
1990	General Motors (SCS)		
1991	Braido		
1992	Banfort Ceará		
1993	Palmeiras		
1994–1996	Denora		
1998	Uninove		

International career
1980–1989	Brazil		
- * Club domestic league appearances and goals

Douglas Pierrotti (born 22 September 1959), also known as Douglas or Douglão, is a Brazilian retired professional futsal player who played as a pivot.

== Career ==
Considered one of the biggest names in Brazilian futsal in the 1980s, Douglas Pierrotti participated in the 1982 and 1985 FIFUSA Futsal World Cup, where he scored 18 goals. He played most of his career for Gercan (Grêmio Esportivo Recreativo Cartório Adalberto Netto), a team with which he won the São Paulo State Gold Series five times. He currently lives in Sorocaba, where he works as a staff member at Magnus Futsal.

== Honours ==
Gercan

- Campeonato Paulista de Futsal: 1982, 1983, 1984, 1985

Transbrasil

- Campeonato Metropolitano: 1987

Banfort

- Taça Brasil de Futsal: 1991

Brazil

- FIFUSA Futsal World Cup: 1982, 1985
- South American Futsal Championships: 1983, 1986
- Panamerican FIFUSA Championship: 1980, 1984
