= 2024 FIFA Futsal World Cup =

International futsal event

FIFA футзал Жаҳон чемпионати 2024 (Uzbek) FIFA futzal Jahon chempionati 2024 Uzbekistan 2024

Tournament details
- Host country: Uzbekistan
- Dates: 14 September – 6 October
- Teams: 24 (from 6 confederations)
- Venues: 3 (in 3 host cities)

Final positions
- Champions: Brazil (6th title)
- Runners-up: Argentina
- Third place: Ukraine
- Fourth place: France

Tournament statistics
- Matches played: 52
- Goals scored: 362 (6.96 per match)
- Attendance: 152,823 (2,939 per match)
- Top scorer(s): (Brazil) Marcel (10 goals)
- Best player: (Brazil) Dyego
- Best goalkeeper: (Brazil) Willian
- Fair play award: Portugal

The 2024 FIFA Futsal World Cup was the tenth edition of the FIFA Futsal World Cup, the quadrennial international futsal championship contested by the men's national teams of the member associations of FIFA. The tournament was held in Uzbekistan. It was the first FIFA tournament ever hosted by Uzbekistan and a Central Asian nation. The tournament returned to its usual four-year cycle after the previous tournament was delayed for a year to 2021 due to the COVID-19 pandemic.

Portugal were the defending champions by defeating Argentina 2–1 in the previous edition, but were eliminated in the round of 16 against Kazakhstan. Brazil won a record-extending sixth title, beating their arch-rivals Argentina by the same scoreline.

== Host selection ==
- India
- Iran
- Morocco
- United States
- Uzbekistan
- Vietnam

In April 2023, Morocco was reported to have been given the hosting rights as they were reported to be the only bid submitted to FIFA. However, Uzbekistan was selected as host on 23 June 2023.

Uzbekistan's enthusiasm and impressive track-record at hosting events were deemed as the reasons for Uzbekistan's selection. This is fourth time an Asian country hosts the event and marks the first time a FIFA tournament has been held in Central Asia. Prior, Uzbekistan was supposed to host the 2012 FIFA U-20 Women's World Cup, but were stripped of the hosting rights due to a number of logistical and technical issues; Japan took their place instead.

== Preparations ==
- On 20 May, the logo was unveiled by FIFA. The logo is supposed to depict the kalampir pepper, used in traditional Uzbek cuisine frequently in shape of the FIFA Futsal World Cup trophy.
- On 19 July, the media accreditation process began.
- On 30 July 2024, the ticket process started.
- On 31 July, in Paris, the trophy handover took place.
- On 7 August, the mascot was realised. Its name is Xon, the Turanian tiger.
- During August, a trophy tour in took place in Andijan, Fergana, Namangan, Jizzakh and Samarkand.

== Qualification ==
Team qualified Team failed to qualify Team suspended Did not enter Not a FIFA member.

A total of 24 teams qualify for the final tournament, in addition to Uzbekistan who qualified automatically as host, 23 other teams qualify from six separate continental competitions. Overall, 121 nations entered qualification.

Of the 24 qualifiers, four made their debut: Afghanistan, France, New Zealand and Tajikistan. Afghanistan's and Tajikistan's qualification, along with Iran and hosts Uzbekistan, means that for the first time, four nations from Central Asia qualified for the World Cup. This is also Tajikistan's first senior FIFA tournament, having previously participated in two FIFA U-17 World Cups. This is Afghanistan's first ever FIFA tournament.

Of the returnees, Europeans Croatia and Netherlands both return after a 24-year absence. Libya returns after last qualifying in 2012 while Cuba and Ukraine qualified after missing out on the previous edition.

Notable absentees include Russia, who were banned from qualification by UEFA due to the country's invasion of Ukraine. The 2022 AFC Futsal Asian Cup champions, Japan, failed to qualify after getting eliminated in the group stage of the 2024 Futsal Asian Cup for the first time in their history. From Africa, Egypt failed to qualify for the first time since 1992 after losing the third place play off at the 2024 Futsal Africa Cup of Nations. After making the 2016 and 2021 editions, Vietnam failed to qualify.

Czech Republic, Serbia, and United States all failed to qualify after making the 2021 edition. The highest ranked team to fail to qualify was 14th, Georgia (Note: Russia, ranked 7th, banned from qualifications.) while Cuba is the lowest ranked team to make it ranked 78th.

Confederation	Qualified through	Team	Appearance	Last appearance	Previous best performance
AFC (Asia) (Hosts + 4 teams)	Host nation	Uzbekistan	3rd	2021	Round of 16 (2021)
AFC (Asia) (Hosts + 4 teams)	2024 AFC Futsal Asian Cup	Afghanistan	1st	N/A	Debut
AFC (Asia) (Hosts + 4 teams)	2024 AFC Futsal Asian Cup	Iran	9th	2021	Third place (2016)
AFC (Asia) (Hosts + 4 teams)	2024 AFC Futsal Asian Cup	Tajikistan	1st	N/A	Debut
AFC (Asia) (Hosts + 4 teams)	2024 AFC Futsal Asian Cup	Thailand	7th	2021	Round of 16 (2012, 2016, 2021)
CAF (Africa) (3 teams)	2024 Futsal Africa Cup of Nations	Angola	2nd	2021	Group stage (2021)
CAF (Africa) (3 teams)	2024 Futsal Africa Cup of Nations	Libya	3rd	2012	Group stage (2008, 2012)
CAF (Africa) (3 teams)	2024 Futsal Africa Cup of Nations	Morocco	4th	2021	Quarter-finals (2021)
CONCACAF (Central, North America and Caribbean) (4 teams)	2024 CONCACAF Futsal Championship	Costa Rica	6th	2021	Round of 16 (2016)
CONCACAF (Central, North America and Caribbean) (4 teams)	2024 CONCACAF Futsal Championship	Cuba	6th	2016	Group stage (1996, 2000, 2004, 2008, 2016)
CONCACAF (Central, North America and Caribbean) (4 teams)	2024 CONCACAF Futsal Championship	Guatemala	6th	2021	Group stage (2000, 2008, 2012, 2016, 2021)
CONCACAF (Central, North America and Caribbean) (4 teams)	2024 CONCACAF Futsal Championship	Panama	4th	2021	Round of 16 (2012)
CONMEBOL (South America) (4 teams)	2024 Copa América de Futsal	Argentina	10th	2021	Champions (2016)
CONMEBOL (South America) (4 teams)	2024 Copa América de Futsal	Brazil	10th	2021	Champions (1989, 1992, 1996, 2008, 2012)
CONMEBOL (South America) (4 teams)	2024 Copa América de Futsal	Paraguay	8th	2021	Quarter-finals (2016)
CONMEBOL (South America) (4 teams)	2024 Copa América de Futsal	Venezuela	2nd	2021	Round of 16 (2021)
OFC (Oceania) (1 team)	2023 OFC Futsal Nations Cup	New Zealand	1st	N/A	Debut
UEFA (Europe) (7 teams)	2024 FIFA Futsal World Cup qualification (UEFA)	Croatia	2nd	2000	Fifth place (2000)
UEFA (Europe) (7 teams)	2024 FIFA Futsal World Cup qualification (UEFA)	France	1st	N/A	Debut
UEFA (Europe) (7 teams)	2024 FIFA Futsal World Cup qualification (UEFA)	Kazakhstan	4th	2021	Fourth place (2021)
UEFA (Europe) (7 teams)	2024 FIFA Futsal World Cup qualification (UEFA)	Netherlands	5th	2000	Runners-up (1989)
UEFA (Europe) (7 teams)	2024 FIFA Futsal World Cup qualification (UEFA)	Portugal	7th	2021	Champions (2021)
UEFA (Europe) (7 teams)	2024 FIFA Futsal World Cup qualification (UEFA)	Spain	10th	2021	Champions (2000, 2004)
UEFA (Europe) (7 teams)	2024 FIFA Futsal World Cup qualification (UEFA)	Ukraine	6th	2016	Fourth place (1996)

== Venues ==
FIFA went to investigate the arenas in the Uzbek cities of Tashkent, Bukhara, Andijan, Samarkand and Fergana. After they received the hosting rights, Uzbekistan proposed four venues for the tournament, all based in the capital Tashkent. Tashkent, Bukhara and Andijan were confirmed as three host cities on 19 April 2024.

2024 FIFA Futsal World Cup is located in Uzbekistan
Andijan	Bukhara	Tashkent
Andijan Universal Sports Complex; Capacity: 2,971	Bukhara Universal Sports Complex; Capacity: 3,105	Humo Arena; Capacity: 9,546

== Final draw ==
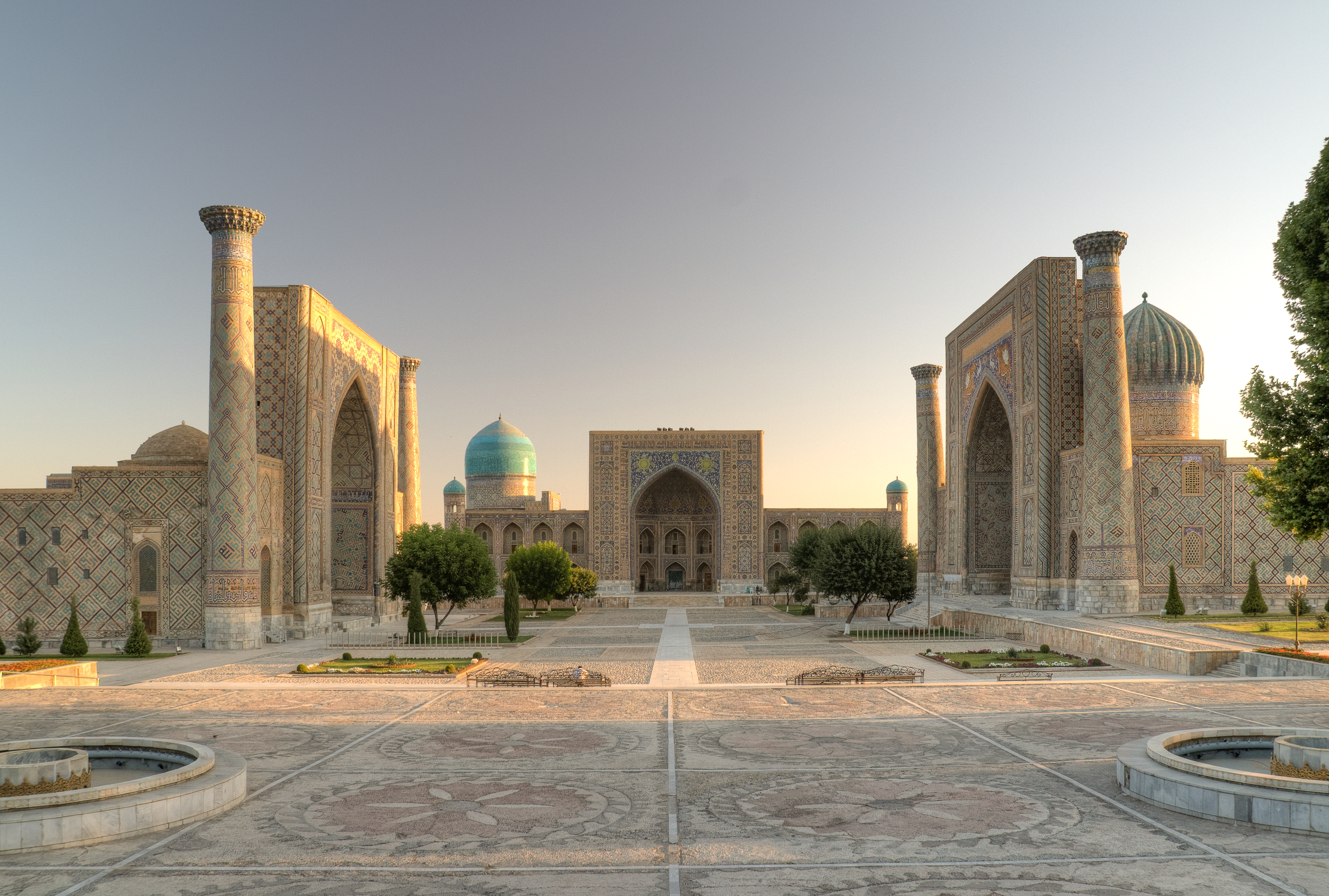
Samarkand’s Registan Square, a UNESCO World Heritage Site, hosted the draw.

The draw was held on 26 May 2024 at the Registan Square in Samarkand at 21:00 UZT. Retired Uzbek footballer, Server Djeparov, former Manchester United and France striker Louis Saha and former Spanish player, Kike, were the guests and assisted the draw.

=== Seeding ===
The 24 teams were drawn into six groups of four teams, with the host Uzbekistan automatically seeded to Pot 1 and placed into the first position of Group A. The seeding was based on the newly created FIFA Futsal World Rankings, that were published on 6 May 2024.

The draw started with the host to A1, the teams from Pot 1 were drawn first, with the teams from Pots 2, 3 and 4 being drawn after. With the exception of UEFA, teams from the same confederation could not be drawn in the same group.

Pot 1	Pot 2	Pot 3	Pot 4
Uzbekistan (11) (hosts); Brazil (1); Portugal (2); Spain (3); Iran (4); Argentina (5)	Morocco (6); Kazakhstan (8); Thailand (9); France (10); Ukraine (12); Paraguay (13)	Croatia (16); New Zealand (19); Venezuela (21); Afghanistan (30); Costa Rica (31); Tajikistan (34)	Netherlands (36); Guatemala (40); Panama (44); Angola (47); Libya (50); Cuba (78)

=== Draw ===
Group A
Pos	Team
A1	Uzbekistan
A2	Netherlands
A3	Paraguay
A4	Costa Rica

Group B
Pos	Team
B1	Brazil
B2	Cuba
B3	Croatia
B4	Thailand

Group C
Pos	Team
C1	Argentina
C2	Ukraine
C3	Afghanistan
C4	Angola

Group D
Pos	Team
D1	Spain
D2	Kazakhstan
D3	New Zealand
D4	Libya

Group E
Pos	Team
E1	Portugal
E2	Panama
E3	Tajikistan
E4	Morocco

Group F
Pos	Team
F1	Iran
F2	Venezuela
F3	Guatemala
F4	France

== Match officials ==
The following officials were chosen for the tournament. For the second time, after the 2021 FIFA Futsal World Cup, in a FIFA Futsal tournament, the Video Support (VS) will be implemented.

Confederation	Referees
AFC	(United Arab Emirates) Fahad Badir Ali Mohamed Alhosani
AFC	(China) Ran An
AFC	(Thailand) Pornnarong Grairod
AFC	(Japan) Hiroyuki Kobayashi
AFC	(Iran) Ebrahim Mehrabi Afshar
AFC	(Uzbekistan) Anatoliy Rubakov
AFC	(Australia) Ryan Shepheard
AFC	(Vietnam) Trương Quốc Dũng
AFC	(China) Liu Jianqiao (support)
CAF	(Egypt) Tarek Elkhataby
CAF	(Egypt) Mohamed Youssef
CAF	(Morocco) Khalid Hnich
CAF	(Tunisia) Aymen Kammoun
CONCACAF	(Cuba) Reinier Fiss
CONCACAF	(El Salvador) Jorge Flores
CONCACAF	(Panama) Ricardo Lay
CONCACAF	(Panama) Roberto López
CONCACAF	(Costa Rica) Diego Molina
CONCACAF	(United States) Josh Wilkens

Confederation	Referees
CONMEBOL	(Chile) Cristian Espíndola
CONMEBOL	(Colombia) Daniel Manrique
CONMEBOL	(Uruguay) Daniel Rodríguez
CONMEBOL	(Peru) Rolly Alexander Rojas
CONMEBOL	(Argentina) Lautaro Romero
CONMEBOL	(Brazil) Anelize Schulz
CONMEBOL	(Paraguay) Bill Rafael Villalba
CONMEBOL	(Venezuela) Oriana Zambrano
OFC	(New Zealand) Anthony Riley
OFC	(New Zealand) Chris Sinclair
UEFA	(Portugal) Cristiano Cardoso
UEFA	(Czech Republic) Ondřej Černý
UEFA	(Spain) Juan José Cordero
UEFA	(Portugal) Eduardo Fernandes
UEFA	(Poland) Damian Grabowski
UEFA	(Croatia) Nikola Jelić
UEFA	(Italy) Nicola Manzione
UEFA	(Spain) Alejandro Martínez
UEFA	(Switzerland) Daniel Matković
UEFA	(Slovenia) Dejan Veselič

== Squads ==
Each team has to name a preliminary squad of a maximum of 30 players (3 of whom must be goalkeepers). From the preliminary squad, the team has to name a final squad of 14 players (two of whom must be goalkeepers) by the FIFA deadline. Players in the final squad can be replaced by a player from the preliminary squad due to serious injury or illness up to 24 hours prior to kickoff of the team's first match. All participating teams have to name their Futsal World Cup 2024 Squads in line with the guidelines set forth by FIFA and by the stipulated deadline. Any team failing to comply will be disqualified.

== Group stage ==
All times are local, UZT (UTC+5). The schedule was announced following the draw.

The top two teams of each group and the four best third-placed teams advance to the round of 16.

=== Tiebreakers ===
The rankings of teams in each group are determined as follows:

1. points obtained in all group matches;
2. goal difference in all group matches;
3. number of goals scored in all group matches;

If two or more teams are equal on the basis of the above three criteria, their rankings are determined as follows:

4. points obtained in the group matches between the teams concerned;
5. goal difference in the group matches between the teams concerned;
6. number of goals scored in the group matches between the teams concerned;
7. fair play points in all group matches (only one deduction could be applied to a player in a single match):
  - Yellow card: −1 points;
  - Indirect red card (second yellow card): −3 points;
  - Direct red card: −4 points;
  - Yellow card and direct red card: −5 points;
8. drawing of lots by the FIFA Organising Committee.

=== Group A ===
Pos	Team	Pld	W	D	L	GF	GA	GD	Pts	Qualification
1	Paraguay	3	2	0	1	11	8	+3	6	Knockout stage
2	Netherlands	3	1	2	0	10	7	+3	5	Knockout stage
3	Costa Rica	3	1	1	1	9	10	−1	4	Knockout stage
4	Uzbekistan (H)	3	0	1	2	7	12	−5	1	

Source: FIFA
(H) Hosts
14 September 2024
17:30

Paraguay	5–2	Costa Rica
Salas 00'49"; Méndez 10'01"; Pascottini 10'14"; Báez 23'26"; F. Martínez 38'14"	Report	Cabalceta 06'08"; Cubillo 16'42"

Humo Arena, Tashkent
Attendance: 5,658
Referee: Pornnarong Grairod (Thailand)
14 September 2024
20:00

Uzbekistan	3–3	Netherlands
Tulkinov 15'18"; Ropiev 35'46"; Nishonov 39'11"	Report	Ceyar 03'17"; Ouaddouh 27'12" (pen.), 36'28"

Humo Arena, Tashkent
Attendance: 7,561
Referee: Khalid Hnich (Morocco)

17 September 2024
17:30

Costa Rica	2–2	Netherlands
Ceyar 06'15" (o.g.); León 31'38"	Report	Bouzambou 18'51"; Ouaddouh 20'32"

Humo Arena, Tashkent
Attendance: 1,481
Referee: Lautaro Romero (Argentina)
17 September 2024
20:00

Uzbekistan	1–4	Paraguay
Nishonov 35'00"	Report	Espinoza 15'49"; Báez 16'03"; F. Martínez 23'10"; Salas 25'19"

Humo Arena, Tashkent
Attendance: 9,081
Referee: Reinier Fiss (Cuba)

20 September 2024
20:00

Costa Rica	5–3	Uzbekistan
Cubillo 03'13"; León 19'18"; Chavarría 31'30"; Cabalceta 32'08"; Salas 37'16"	Report	Adilov 13'36"; Hamroev 26'07"; Berkinov 29'33"

Humo Arena, Tashkent
Attendance: 8,025
Referee: Anelize Schulz (Brazil)
20 September 2024
20:00

Netherlands	5–2	Paraguay
Martinus 06'22"; Cretier 07'15", 34'27"; Chih 27'28", 36'31"	Report	Pascottini 16'11"; Suárez 22'32"

Bukhara Universal Sports Complex, Bukhara
Attendance: 2,411
Referee: Hiroyuki Kobayashi (Japan)

=== Group B ===
Pos	Team	Pld	W	D	L	GF	GA	GD	Pts	Qualification
1	Brazil	3	3	0	0	27	2	+25	9	Knockout stage
2	Thailand	3	2	0	1	13	15	−2	6	Knockout stage
3	Croatia	3	1	0	2	9	10	−1	3	Knockout stage
4	Cuba	3	0	0	3	5	27	−22	0	

Source: FIFA
14 September 2024
15:00

Croatia	1–2	Thailand
Sekulić 30'33"	Report	Osamanmusa 02'45"; Jungwongsuk 29'15"

Bukhara Universal Sports Complex, Bukhara
Attendance: 1,250
Referee: Cristian Espíndola (Chile)
14 September 2024
17:30

Brazil	10–0	Cuba
Marcel 01'18", 22'25", 32'54"; Neguinho 10'41"; Marlon 12'16", 22'52", 38'40"; Felipe Valério 12'46"; Pito 24'06"; Arthur 27'30"	Report

Bukhara Universal Sports Complex, Bukhara
Attendance: 2,045
Referee: Ondřej Černý (Czech Republic)

17 September 2024
17:30

Thailand	10–5	Cuba
Aransanyalak 05'10"; Jungwongsuk 11'57"; Thueanklang 13'58", 25'49"; Praphaphan 28'03", 28'32"; Osamanmusa 28'57", 36'07"; Chaemcharoen 31'21"; Phalaphruek 38'13"	Report	Valiente 03'48"; Morejón 15'10", 36'42"; Cotilla 15'18"; Martínez 29'20"

Bukhara Universal Sports Complex, Bukhara
Attendance: 1,341
Referee: Cristiano Cardoso (Portugal)
17 September 2024
20:00

Brazil	8–1	Croatia
Pito 12'34", 24'17"; Dyego 16'17" (2pen.); Marcel 17'08", 23'13"; Neguinho 18'14"; Arthur 28'43"; Rafa Santos 36'35"	Report	Marinović 14'12"

Bukhara Universal Sports Complex, Bukhara
Attendance: 2,382
Referee: Ebrahim Mehrabi Afshar (Iran)

20 September 2024
17:30

Thailand	1–9	Brazil
Osamanmusa 19'18"	Report	Marcel 05'37", 19'29", 35'03"; Felipe Valério 10'00"; Pito 22'12", 30'33"; Marlon 23'25"; Wongkaeo 26'00" (o.g.); Ferrão 36'47"

Bukhara Universal Sports Complex, Bukhara
Attendance: 2,040
Referee: Diego Molina (Costa Rica)
20 September 2024
17:30

Cuba	0–7	Croatia
	Report	Čekol 01'24", 26'16"; Vukmir 12'41"; Perić 22'35", 30'51"; Marinović 24'59"; Mataja 30'19"

Humo Arena, Tashkent
Attendance: 1,528
Referee: Nicola Manzione (Italy)

=== Group C ===
Pos	Team	Pld	W	D	L	GF	GA	GD	Pts	Qualification
1	Argentina	3	3	0	0	18	7	+11	9	Knockout stage
2	Ukraine	3	2	0	1	12	10	+2	6	Knockout stage
3	Afghanistan	3	1	0	2	8	10	−2	3	Knockout stage
4	Angola	3	0	0	3	11	22	−11	0	

Source: FIFA
15 September 2024
17:30

Afghanistan	6–4	Angola
Mahmoodi 01'01"; Qanbari 06'15"; Mohammadi 09'10"; Nowrozi 13'15"; Kazemi 15'46"; Hosseinpour 39'21"	Report	Safari 02'23" (o.g.); Adérito 06'52", 35'53"; Moradi 39'37" (o.g.)

Humo Arena, Tashkent
Attendance: 2,106
Referee: Dejan Veselič (Slovenia)
15 September 2024
20:00

Argentina	7–1	Ukraine
Arrieta 18'05" (2pen.), 31'31"; Brandi 18'24"; Rosa 20'35"; Borruto 29'43", 39'47"; Bolo Alemany 37'53"	Report	Shoturma 17'27"

Humo Arena, Tashkent
Attendance: 3,086
Referee: Anthony Riley (New Zealand)

18 September 2024
17:30

Angola	2–7	Ukraine
Helber 16'59"; Vedo 39'10"	Report	Zhuk 06'58" (pen.); Korsun 12'49", 15'34"; Melnyk 25'29"; Zvarych 27'23"; Cherniavskyi 31'53"; Shved 39'53"

Humo Arena, Tashkent
Attendance: 1,374
Referee: Ran An (China)
18 September 2024
20:00

Argentina	2–1	Afghanistan
Rosa 02'46", 32'14"	Report	Sarmiento 31'50" (o.g.)

Humo Arena, Tashkent
Attendance: 3,442
Referee: Eduardo Fernandes (Portugal)

21 September 2024
20:00

Angola	5–9	Argentina
Jó 00'55", 01'59", 09'56"; Claudino 31'45" (o.g.); Adérito 32'53"	Report	Brandi 06'02", 16'12", 33'25", 33'31", 34'22"; Borruto 12'35"; Arrieta 17'41"; Trípodi 30'48"; Claudino 32'34"

Humo Arena, Tashkent
Attendance: 4,449
Referee: Chris Sinclair (New Zealand)
21 September 2024
20:00

Ukraine	4–1	Afghanistan
Zhuk 14'01" (pen.); Abakshyn 15'05"; Zvarych 36'57"; Korsun 37'17"	Report	Gholami 25'04"

Andijan Universal Sports Complex, Andijan
Attendance: 2,090
Referee: Jorge Flores (El Salvador)

=== Group D ===
Pos	Team	Pld	W	D	L	GF	GA	GD	Pts	Qualification
1	Spain	3	2	1	0	16	2	+14	7	Knockout stage
2	Kazakhstan	3	2	1	0	15	2	+13	7	Knockout stage
3	Libya	3	1	0	2	4	13	−9	3	
4	New Zealand	3	0	0	3	2	20	−18	0	

Source: FIFA
15 September 2024
15:00

New Zealand	1–3	Libya
Ditfort 39'34"	Report	Khamis 06'39"; Zreeg 28'16"; Abuksheam 39'22"

Andijan Universal Sports Complex, Andijan
Attendance: 1,195
Referee: Anatoliy Rubakov (Uzbekistan)
15 September 2024
17:30

Spain	1–1	Kazakhstan
Gordillo 16'23"	Report	Orazov 00'05"

Andijan Universal Sports Complex, Andijan
Attendance: 1,808
Referee: Roberto López (Panama)

18 September 2024
17:30

Libya	1–4	Kazakhstan
Khamis 16'24"	Report	Suhayb 14'52" (o.g.); Orazov 16'51"; Rashit 17'40"; Akbalikov 34'40"

Andijan Universal Sports Complex, Andijan
Attendance: 1,572
Referee: Daniel Rodríguez (Uruguay)
18 September 2024
20:00

Spain	7–1	New Zealand
Mellado 11'14"; Gómez 20'18"; Catela 24'26", 31'00", 32'04"; Gordillo 25'12"; Campos 29'50"	Report	Twigg 05'58"

Andijan Universal Sports Complex, Andijan
Attendance: 1,993
Referee: Mohamed Youssef (Egypt)

21 September 2024
17:30

Libya	0–8	Spain
	Report	Mellado 08'56", 15'54", 27'31"; Fernández 09'43"; Cortés 14'38", 28'19"; Catela 18'46"; Gordillo 31'48"

Andijan Universal Sports Complex, Andijan
Attendance: 1,703
Referee: Fahad Alhosani (United Arab Emirates)
21 September 2024
17:30

Kazakhstan	10–0	New Zealand
Turegazin 08'14"; Daribay 11'44"; Knaub 14'18", 15'50", 20'22", 22'25", 36'09"; Leo 20'46", 29'36"; Wisnewski 30'42" (o.g.)	Report

Humo Arena, Tashkent
Attendance: 3,828
Referee: Ricardo Lay (Panama)

=== Group E ===
Pos	Team	Pld	W	D	L	GF	GA	GD	Pts	Qualification
1	Portugal	3	3	0	0	17	4	+13	9	Knockout stage
2	Morocco	3	2	0	1	11	9	+2	6	Knockout stage
3	Panama	3	1	0	2	12	19	−7	3	
4	Tajikistan	3	0	0	3	7	15	−8	0	

Source: FIFA
16 September 2024
17:30

Portugal	10–1	Panama
Peñaloza 04'37" (o.g.); Afonso 05'11", 15'48"; Bruno Coelho 07'48"; Tomás Paçó 10'59"; Erick 11'33"; André 16'42", 28'51"; Kutchy 19'27"; Pany 36'16"	Report	Maquensi 34'05" (pen.)

Humo Arena, Tashkent
Attendance: 2,078
Referee: Ryan Shepheard (Australia)
16 September 2024
20:00

Tajikistan	2–4	Morocco
Rizomov 33'02"; Sardorov 38'12"	Report	Boumezou 00'23", 28'24"; Charraoui 36'53"; Raiss El Fenni 37'26"

Humo Arena, Tashkent
Attendance: 3,959
Referee: Oriana Zambrano (Venezuela)

19 September 2024
17:30

Morocco	6–3	Panama
El Mesrar 01'31", 38'28"; Charraoui 05'38", 16'22"; Raiss El Fenni 21'56", 35'31"	Report	Ortiz 15'36"; Campos 26'44"; Maquensi 32'23"

Humo Arena, Tashkent
Attendance: 1,291
Referee: Daniel Manrique (Colombia)
19 September 2024
20:00

Portugal	3–2	Tajikistan
Pany 01'31"; Zicky 10'17"; Erick 27'56"	Report	Aliev 26'38"; Soliev 39'58"

Humo Arena, Tashkent
Attendance: 3,239
Referee: Jorge Flores (El Salvador)

22 September 2024
17:30

Morocco	1–4	Portugal
El Mesrar 33'33"	Report	Erick 01'59"; Bruno Coelho 18'09" (pen.), 21'08"; Zicky 38'27"

Humo Arena, Tashkent
Attendance: 2,077
Referee: Bill Rafael Villalba (Paraguay)
22 September 2024
17:30

Panama	8–3	Tajikistan
Salomov 13'10" (o.g.); Forero 13'35"; Milord 19'54"; Maquensi 30'39"; Caballero 37'15", 38'38"; Castrellón 38'01", 38'17"	Report	Alimakhmadov 04'39"; Rizomov 26'09"; Yorov 34'07"

Bukhara Universal Sports Complex, Bukhara
Attendance: 1,572
Referee: Damian Grabowski (Poland)

=== Group F ===
Pos	Team	Pld	W	D	L	GF	GA	GD	Pts	Qualification
1	Iran	3	3	0	0	20	6	+14	9	Knockout stage
2	France	3	2	0	1	14	10	+4	6	Knockout stage
3	Venezuela	3	1	0	2	11	17	−6	3	Knockout stage
4	Guatemala	3	0	0	3	10	22	−12	0	

Source: FIFA
16 September 2024
17:30

Iran	7–1	Venezuela
Aghapour 07'00", 22'07"; Karimi 09'54", 12'43"; Azimi 18'55", 38'27"; Davoudi 26'25"	Report	M. Francia 14'08"

Bukhara Universal Sports Complex, Bukhara
Attendance: 1,694
Referee: Nikola Jelić (Croatia)
16 September 2024
20:00

Guatemala	3–6	France
Sandoval 01'02"; Alvarado 09'35"; P. Ruíz 19'25"	Report	Tchaptchet 12'33", 17'25"; Mouhoudine 20'06"; Ramirez 30'10"; Mohammed 31'39"; Lutin 36'04"

Bukhara Universal Sports Complex, Bukhara
Attendance: 2,079
Referee: Aymen Kammoun (Tunisia)

19 September 2024
17:30

Iran	9–4	Guatemala
Ahmadabbasi 05'55", 26'30", 39'15"; Aghapour 10'14", 20'58"; Tayyebi 13'15", 36'08"; Azimi 24'22"; Karimi 31'34"	Report	P. Ruíz 05'42", 14'32"; Sandoval 19'30"; E. Santizo 37'16"

Bukhara Universal Sports Complex, Bukhara
Attendance: 1,209
Referee: Alejandro Martínez (Spain)
19 September 2024
20:00

France	7–3	Venezuela
Menéndez 05'23"; Saadaoui 16'02"; Ramirez 18'34", 37'38"; Touré 25'49"; Lutin 32'13"; Belhaj 38'58"	Report	Briceño 13'03", 21'49"; Viamonte 13'59"

Bukhara Universal Sports Complex, Bukhara
Attendance: 1,726
Referee: Trương Quốc Dũng (Vietnam)

22 September 2024
20:00

France	1–4	Iran
Touré 36'28"	Report	Aghapour 24'25", 36'23"; Oladghobad 27'16"; Rafieipour 29'19"

Bukhara Universal Sports Complex, Bukhara
Attendance: 2,641
Referee: Tarek Elkhataby (Egypt)
22 September 2024
20:00

Venezuela	7–3	Guatemala
Briceño 00'40", 32'37", 35'56"; Cabarcas 17'49"; Carreño 24'42"; Viamonte 26'37"; Sanz 34'35"	Report	Paniagua 15'34"; Sandoval 31'16"; Tagre 39'28"

Humo Arena, Tashkent
Attendance: 2,650
Referee: Daniel Matković (Switzerland)

=== Ranking of third-placed teams ===
The four best third-placed teams from the six groups advance to the knockout stage along with the six group winners and six runners-up.

Pos	Grp	Team	Pld	W	D	L	GF	GA	GD	Pts	Qualification
1	A	Costa Rica	3	1	1	1	9	10	−1	4	Knockout stage
2	B	Croatia	3	1	0	2	9	10	−1	3	Knockout stage
3	C	Afghanistan	3	1	0	2	8	10	−2	3	Knockout stage
4	F	Venezuela	3	1	0	2	11	17	−6	3	Knockout stage
5	E	Panama	3	1	0	2	12	19	−7	3	
6	D	Libya	3	1	0	2	4	13	−9	3	

Source: FIFA

== Knockout stage ==
In the knockout stage, if a match is level at the end of normal playing time, extra time shall be played (two periods of five minutes each) and followed, if necessary, by a penalty shoot-out to determine the winner. However, for the third place match, if it is played directly before the final, no extra time shall be played and the winner shall be determined by a penalty shoot-out.

Combinations of matches in the Round of 16

The specific match-ups involving the third-placed teams depend on which four third-placed teams qualified for the round of 16:

Combination according to the four qualified teams

Third-placed teams qualify from groups						1A vs	1B vs	1C vs	1D vs
A	B	C	D			3C	3D	3A	3B
A	B	C		E		3C	3A	3B	3E
A	B	C			F	3C	3A	3B	3F
A	B		D	E		3D	3A	3B	3E
A	B		D		F	3D	3A	3B	3F
A	B			E	F	3E	3A	3B	3F
A		C	D	E		3C	3D	3A	3E
A		C	D		F	3C	3D	3A	3F
A		C		E	F	3C	3A	3F	3E
A			D	E	F	3D	3A	3F	3E
	B	C	D	E		3C	3D	3B	3E
	B	C	D		F	3C	3D	3B	3F
	B	C		E	F	3E	3C	3B	3F
	B		D	E	F	3E	3D	3B	3F
		C	D	E	F	3C	3D	3F	3E

=== Bracket ===
Round of 16
24 September – Tashkent
Netherlands	1
Ukraine	3
25 September – Andijan
Spain	1
Venezuela	2
24 September – Bukhara
Brazil	5
Costa Rica	0
26 September – Bukhara
Iran	3
Morocco	4
26 September – Andijan
Portugal	1
Kazakhstan	2
27 September – Tashkent
Argentina	2
Croatia	0
27 September – Bukhara
Thailand	2
France	5
25 September – Tashkent
Paraguay (a.e.t.)	3
Afghanistan	1

Quarter-finals
29 September – Tashkent
Ukraine	9
Venezuela	4
29 September – Bukhara
Brazil	3
Morocco	1
30 September – Tashkent
Kazakhstan	1
Argentina	6
30 September – Bukhara
France	2
Paraguay	1

Semi-finals
2 October – Tashkent
Ukraine	2
Brazil	3
3 October – Tashkent
Argentina	3
France	2

Final
6 October – Tashkent
Brazil	2
Argentina	1
Third place match
6 October – Tashkent
Ukraine	7
France	1

=== Round of 16 ===
All times are local, UZT (UTC+5).

24 September 2024
17:30

Brazil	5–0	Costa Rica
Marcel 04'37"; Felipe Valério 11'09"; Leandro Lino 27'46"; Neguinho 35'09", 39'34"	Report

Bukhara Universal Sports Complex, Bukhara
Attendance: 1,471
Referee: Juan José Cordero (Spain)

24 September 2024
20:00

Netherlands	1–3	Ukraine
Bouzambou 28'54"	Report	Zvarych 05'28"; Melnyk 30'29", 39'23"

Humo Arena, Tashkent
Attendance: 1,883
Referee: Daniel Rodríguez (Uruguay)

25 September 2024
17:30

Spain	1–2	Venezuela
Gómez 23'53"	Report	Villalobos 12'54"; Carreño 38'39"

Andijan Universal Sports Complex, Andijan
Attendance: 1,235
Referee: Ran An (China)

25 September 2024
20:00

Paraguay	3–1 (a.e.t.)	Afghanistan
F. Martínez 29'40"; Méndez 40'51"; Espinoza 41'02"	Report	Hossaini 14'34"

Humo Arena, Tashkent
Attendance: 1,874
Referee: Mohamed Youssef (Egypt)

26 September 2024
17:30

Iran	3–4	Morocco
Derakhshani 03'34"; Tayyebi 20'28"; Oladghobad 21'26"	Report	Bouzid 06'55"; Rafieipour 10'51" (o.g.); El Mesrar 16'40"; Raiss El-Fenni 19'29"

Bukhara Universal Sports Complex, Bukhara
Attendance: 1,954
Referee: Daniel Matkovic (Switzerland)

26 September 2024
20:00

Portugal	1–2	Kazakhstan
Zicky 20'16"	Report	Yesenamanov 10'23"; Tursagulov 39'46"

Andijan Universal Sports Complex, Andijan
Attendance: 2,825
Referee: Lautaro Romero (Argentina)

27 September 2024
17:30

Thailand	2–5	France
Thueanklang 24'03" (p); Wingwon 32'32"	Report	Bendali 08'00"; Touré 22'32"; Mohammed 28'46"; Mouhoudine 37'40"; Saadaoui 38'43"

Bukhara Universal Sports Complex, Bukhara
Attendance: 1,017
Referee: Anthony Riley (New Zealand)

27 September 2024
20:00

Argentina	2–0	Croatia
Brandi 01'30"; Rosa 23'09"	Report

Humo Arena, Tashkent
Attendance: 2,307
Referee: Anatoliy Rubakov (Uzbekistan)

=== Quarter-finals ===
29 September 2024
17:30

Brazil	3–1	Morocco
Marcel 11'02"; Leandro Lino 17'01"; Dyego 28'55"	Report	Boumezou 34'23"

Bukhara Universal Sports Complex, Bukhara
Attendance: 2,705
Referee: Alejandro Martínez (Spain)

29 September 2024
20:00

Ukraine	9–4	Venezuela
Abakshyn 04'13", 15'06", 17'14"; Shoturma 13'56"; Shved 19'37"; Semenchenko 20'24"; Sukhov 26'09"; Cherniavskyi 31'34"; Mykytiuk 37'51"	Report	M. Francia 05'12"; Viamonte 15'41"; Vidal 16'02"; Morillo 29'38"

Humo Arena, Tashkent
Attendance: 3,209
Referee: Tarek Elkhataby (Egypt)

30 September 2024
17:30

France	2–1	Paraguay
Guirio 21'57"; Mohammed 34'09"	Report	F. Martínez 27'51"

Bukhara Universal Sports Complex, Bukhara
Attendance: 1,115
Referee: Jorge Flores (El Salvador)

30 September 2024
20:00

Kazakhstan	1–6	Argentina
Tursagulov 33'32"	Report	Rosa 21'59"; Claudino 26'39"; Arrieta 28'52" (p), 35'39" (p); Corso 32'02"; Bolo 33'57"

Humo Arena, Tashkent
Attendance: 8,898
Referee: Ondřej Černý (Czech Republic)

=== Semi-finals ===
2 October 2024
20:00

Ukraine	2–3	Brazil
Cherniavskyi 17'03"; Korsun 28'56"	Report	Semenchenko 20'46" (o.g.); Dyego 22'00", 35'50" (2pen.)

Humo Arena, Tashkent
Attendance: 4,208
Referee: Anthony Riley (New Zealand)

3 October 2024
20:00

Argentina	3–2	France
Arrieta 02'14", 36'33" (2pen.); Claudino 07'07"	Report	Menéndez 05'29"; Touré 24'32"

Humo Arena, Tashkent
Attendance: 4,539
Referee: Ryan Shepheard (Australia)

=== Third place match ===
6 October 2024
17:30

Ukraine	7–1	France
Cherniavskyi 10'20"; Zvarych 21'06"; Zhuk 26'55", 27'39"; Abakshyn 29'20", 29'39", 32'50"	Report	Saadaoui 22'10"

Humo Arena, Tashkent
Attendance: 4,890
Referee: Daniel Rodríguez (Uruguay)

=== Final ===
6 October 2024
20:00

Brazil	2–1	Argentina
Ferrão 05'47"; Rafa Santos 12'34"	Report	Rosa 38'00"

Humo Arena, Tashkent
Attendance: 9,029
Referee: Alejandro Martínez (Spain)

== Awards ==
The following awards were given for the tournament:

Golden Shoe winner	Golden Ball winner	Golden Glove winner
(Brazil) Marcel	(Brazil) Dyego	(Brazil) Willian Dorn
Silver Shoe winner	Silver Ball winner	FIFA Fair Play Trophy
(Ukraine) Danyil Abakshyn	(Brazil) Marlon	Portugal
Bronze Shoe winner	Bronze Ball winner	Goal of the Tournament
(Argentina) Kevin Arrieta	(Ukraine) Rostyslav Semenchenko	

== Goalscorers ==
There have been 362 goals scored in 52 matches, for an average of 6.96 goals per match (as of 6 October 2024).

10 goals

- (Brazil) Marcel

7 goals

- (Argentina) Kevin Arrieta
- (Argentina) Alan Brandi
- (Ukraine) Danyil Abakshyn

6 goals

- (Argentina) Matías Rosa
- (Iran) Salar Aghapour

5 goals

- (Brazil) Pito
- (Kazakhstan) Arnold Knaub
- (Venezuela) Kevin Briceño

4 goals

- (Brazil) Dyego
- (Brazil) Marlon
- (Brazil) Neguinho
- (Spain) Catela
- (Spain) Miguel Mellado
- (Morocco) Soufiane El Mesrar
- (Morocco) Idriss Raiss El Fenni
- (Paraguay) Francisco Martínez
- (Thailand) Muhammad Osamanmusa
- (Ukraine) Ihor Cherniavskyi
- (Ukraine) Ihor Korsun
- (Ukraine) Yevhenii Zhuk
- (Ukraine) Mykhailo Zvarych

3 goals

- (Angola) Adérito
- (Angola) Jó
- (Argentina) Cristian Borruto
- (Argentina) Ángel Claudino
- (Brazil) Felipe Valério
- (France) Abdessamad Mohammed
- (France) Kévin Ramirez
- (France) Ayoub Saadaoui
- (Guatemala) Patrick Ruiz
- (Guatemala) Marvin Sandoval
- (Iran) Saeid Ahmadabbasi
- (Iran) Behrooz Azimi
- (Iran) Mahdi Karimi
- (Iran) Hossein Tayyebi
- (Morocco) Otmane Boumezou
- (Morocco) Soufian Charraoui
- (Netherlands) Ismail Ouaddouh
- (Panama) Alfonso Maquensi
- (Portugal) Bruno Coelho
- (Portugal) Erick
- (Portugal) Zicky Té
- (Spain) Jesús Gordillo
- (Thailand) Suphawut Thueanklang
- (Ukraine) Andrii Melnyk
- (Venezuela) Jesus Viamonte

2 goals

- (Argentina) Lucas Bolo Alemany
- (Brazil) Arthur
- (Brazil) Ferrão
- (Brazil) Leandro Lino
- (Brazil) Rafa Santos
- (Costa Rica) Minor Cabalceta
- (Costa Rica) Edwin Cubillo
- (Costa Rica) Yosel León
- (Croatia) Kristian Čekol
- (Croatia) Dario Marinović
- (Croatia) Luka Perić
- (Cuba) Cristián Morejón
- (France) Nelson Lutin
- (France) Nicolás Menéndez
- (France) Souheil Mouhoudine
- (France) Mamadou Pre Touré
- (France) Mamadou Siragassy Touré
- (France) Arthur Tchaptchet
- (Iran) Moslem Oladghobad
- (Kazakhstan) Leo
- (Kazakhstan) Birzhan Orazov
- (Kazakhstan) Dauren Tursagulov
- (Libya) Mohamed Khamis
- (Netherlands) Said Bouzambou
- (Netherlands) Mohamed Chih
- (Netherlands) Jordy Cretier
- (Panama) José Caballero
- (Panama) Abdiel Castrellón
- (Paraguay) Arnaldo Báez
- (Paraguay) Jorge Espinoza
- (Paraguay) Emerson Méndez
- (Paraguay) Pedro Pascottini
- (Paraguay) Adolfo Salas
- (Portugal) Afonso
- (Portugal) André
- (Portugal) Pany
- (Spain) Francisco Cortés
- (Spain) Raúl Gómez
- (Tajikistan) Samandar Rizomov
- (Thailand) Ronnachai Jungwongsuk
- (Thailand) Itticha Praphaphan
- (Ukraine) Petro Shoturma
- (Ukraine) Nazar Shved
- (Uzbekistan) Husniddin Nishanov
- (Venezuela) Víctor Carreño
- (Venezuela) Milton Francia

1 goal

- (Afghanistan) Mehran Gholami
- (Afghanistan) Hamid Hossaini
- (Afghanistan) Reza Hosseinpour
- (Afghanistan) Akbar Kazemi
- (Afghanistan) Farzad Mahmoodi
- (Afghanistan) Hussain Mohammadi
- (Afghanistan) Mahdi Norowzi
- (Afghanistan) Omid Qanbari
- (Angola) Helber
- (Angola) Vedo
- (Argentina) Sebastián Corso
- (Argentina) Lucas Trípodi
- (Costa Rica) Diego Chavarría
- (Costa Rica) Jean Salas
- (Croatia) David Mataja
- (Croatia) Antonio Sekulić
- (Croatia) Niko Vukmir
- (Cuba) Dayan Cotilla
- (Cuba) Iduan Martínez
- (Cuba) Cristián Valiente
- (France) Sid Belhaj
- (France) Steve Bendali
- (France) Ouassini Guirio
- (Guatemala) Román Alvarado
- (Guatemala) Jenner Paniagua
- (Guatemala) Edgar Santizo
- (Guatemala) Nelson Tagre
- (Iran) Amirhossein Davoudi
- (Iran) Mohammad Derakhshani
- (Iran) Alireza Rafieipour
- (Kazakhstan) Albert Akbalikov
- (Kazakhstan) Akzhol Daribay
- (Kazakhstan) Zhakhangir Rashit
- (Kazakhstan) Rinat Turegazin
- (Kazakhstan) Chingiz Yesenamanov
- (Libya) Feras Abuksheam
- (Libya) Mohamed Zreeg
- (Morocco) Khalid Bouzid
- (Netherlands) Tevfik Ceyar
- (Netherlands) Jordany Martinus
- (New Zealand) Jordan Ditfort
- (New Zealand) Art Twigg
- (Panama) Aquiles Campos
- (Panama) Mario Forero
- (Panama) Ruman Milord
- (Panama) Abdiel Ortiz
- (Paraguay) Lucas Suárez
- (Portugal) Kutchy
- (Portugal) Tomás Paçó
- (Spain) Raúl Campos
- (Spain) Adolfo Fernández
- (Tajikistan) Komron Aliyev
- (Tajikistan) Nekruz Alimakhmadov
- (Tajikistan) Fayzali Sardorov
- (Tajikistan) Bakhtiyor Soliyev
- (Tajikistan) Idris Yorov
- (Thailand) Krit Aransanyalak
- (Thailand) Apiwat Chaemcharoen
- (Thailand) Sarawut Phalaphruek
- (Thailand) Narongsak Wingwon
- (Ukraine) Mykola Mykytiuk
- (Ukraine) Rostyslav Semenchenko
- (Ukraine) Oleksandr Sukhov
- (Uzbekistan) Mashrab Adilov
- (Uzbekistan) Samariddin Berkinov
- (Uzbekistan) Ilham Hamrayev
- (Uzbekistan) Ihtiyar Rapiyev
- (Uzbekistan) Elbek Tolqinov
- (Venezuela) Wilmer Cabarcas
- (Venezuela) Rafael Morillo
- (Venezuela) Carlos Sanz
- (Venezuela) Alfredo Vidal
- (Venezuela) José Villalobos

1 own goal

- (Afghanistan) Mohammad Javad Safari (against Angola)
- (Afghanistan) Mohammad Moradi (against Angola)
- (Argentina) Angel Claudino (against Angola)
- (Argentina) Nicolas Sarmiento (against Afghanistan)
- (Iran) Alireza Rafieipour (against Morocco)
- (Libya) Abraheem Suhayb (against Kazakhstan)
- (Netherlands) Tevfik Ceyar (against Costa Rica)
- (New Zealand) Logan Wisnewski (against Kazakhstan)
- (Panama) Jaime Penaloza (against Portugal)
- (Tajikistan) Dilshod Salomov (against Panama)
- (Thailand) Kritsada Wongkaeo (against Brazil)
- (Ukraine) Rostyslav Semenchenko (against Brazil)

== Tournament ranking ==
Per statistical convention in football, matches decided in extra time are counted as wins and losses, while matches decided by penalty shoot-out are counted as draws.

Pos	Team	Pld	W	D	L	GF	GA	GD	Pts	Final result
1	Brazil	7	7	0	0	40	6	+34	21	Champions
2	Argentina	7	6	0	1	30	12	+18	18	Runners-up
3	Ukraine	7	5	0	2	33	19	+14	15	Third place
4	France	7	4	0	3	24	23	+1	12	Fourth place
5	Kazakhstan	5	3	1	1	18	9	+9	10	Eliminated in Quarter-finals
6	Paraguay	5	3	0	2	15	11	+4	9	Eliminated in Quarter-finals
7	Morocco	5	3	0	2	16	15	+1	9	Eliminated in Quarter-finals
8	Venezuela	5	2	0	3	17	27	–10	6	Eliminated in Quarter-finals
9	Iran	4	3	0	1	23	10	+13	9	Eliminated in Round of 16
10	Portugal	4	3	0	1	18	6	+12	9	Eliminated in Round of 16
11	Spain	4	2	1	1	17	4	+13	7	Eliminated in Round of 16
12	Thailand	4	2	0	2	15	20	–5	6	Eliminated in Round of 16
13	Netherlands	4	1	2	1	11	10	+1	5	Eliminated in Round of 16
14	Costa Rica	4	1	1	2	9	15	–6	4	Eliminated in Round of 16
15	Croatia	4	1	0	3	9	12	–3	3	Eliminated in Round of 16
16	Afghanistan	4	1	0	3	9	13	–4	3	Eliminated in Round of 16
17	Panama	3	1	0	2	12	19	–7	3	Eliminated in Group stage
18	Libya	3	1	0	2	4	13	–9	3	Eliminated in Group stage
19	Uzbekistan	3	0	1	2	7	12	–5	1	Eliminated in Group stage
20	Tajikistan	3	0	0	3	7	15	–8	0	Eliminated in Group stage
21	Angola	3	0	0	3	11	22	–11	0	Eliminated in Group stage
22	Guatemala	3	0	0	3	10	22	–12	0	Eliminated in Group stage
23	New Zealand	3	0	0	3	2	20	–18	0	Eliminated in Group stage
24	Cuba	3	0	0	3	5	27	–22	0	Eliminated in Group stage

== Sponsorship ==
FIFA Partners

- Adidas
- Coca-Cola
- Aramco
- Qatar Airways
- Hyundai
- Visa

Tournament Supporters

- Valvoline
- Almalyk Mining and Metallurgical Combine
- Apex Insurance
- Apex Life
- Artel
- BMB Holding
- Saber Perfume
- Uztelecom

== See also ==
- 2025 FIFA Futsal Women's World Cup
