= Tiago Marinho =

Brazilian futsal player

Tiago
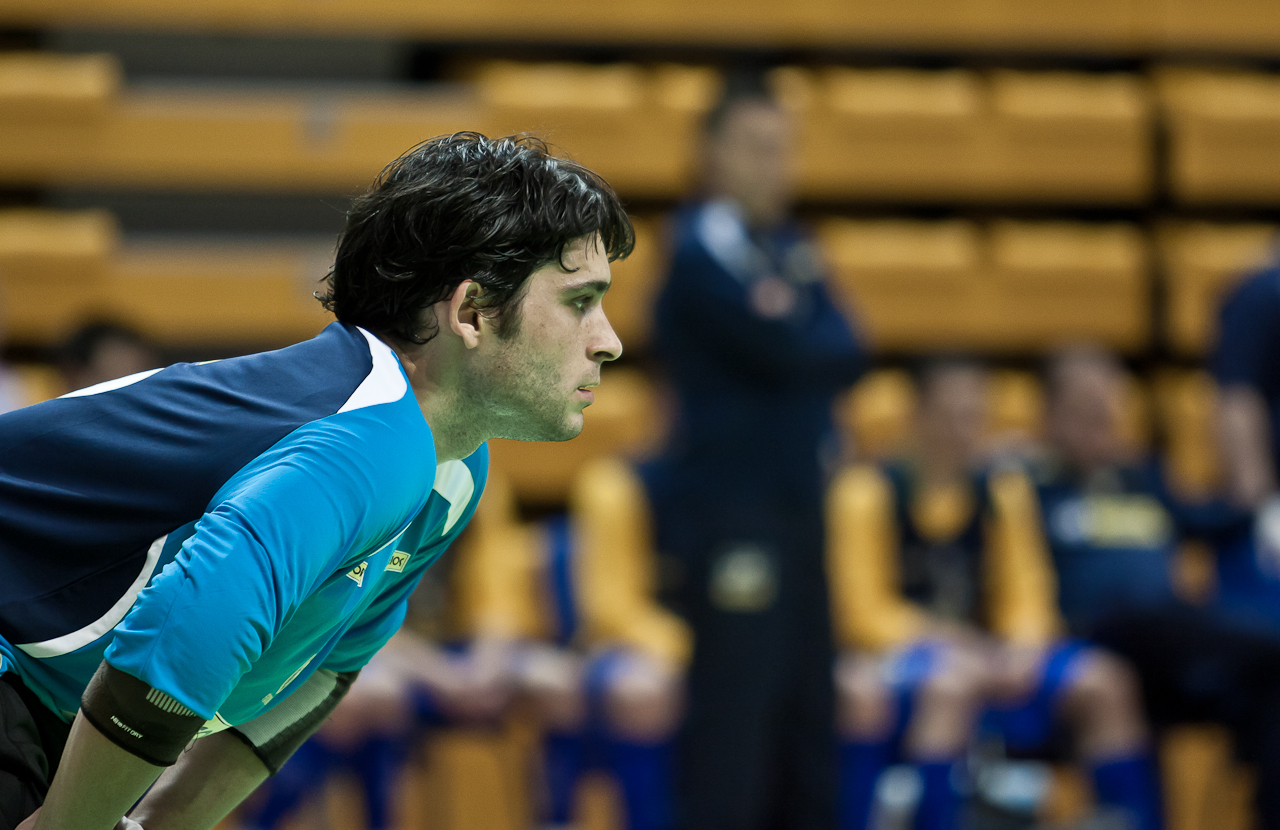
- Tiago (2011)

Personal information
- Full name: Tiago de Melo Marinho
- Date of birth: 9 March 1981 (age 45)
- Place of birth: São Paulo, Brazil
- Height: 1.73 m (5 ft 8 in)
- Position: Goalkeeper

Team information
- Current team: Jaraguá
- Number: 2

Senior career*
Years	Team	Apps	(Gls)
2006–2010	Malwee/Jaraguá		
2011–2012	Gazprom-Yugra		
2011	São José		
2012–2013	Joinville		
2014–2018	Sorocaba		
2019	Corinthians		
2020	Pato		
2021	Atlântico		
2022–	Jaraguá		

International career
2005–2019	Brazil		
- * Club domestic league appearances and goals

Tiago de Melo Marinho, commonly known as Tiago, (born 9 March 1981), is a Brazilian futsal player who plays for Jaraguá and who is the former player of Brazilian national futsal team, with whom he became the world champion in 2008 and 2012.

In 2007, Tiago was acknowledged as the best futsal goalkeeper of the year by Futsalplanet.com.
