= Nicolás Sarmiento =

Argentine futsal player

Personal information
- Date of birth: 3 December 1992 (age 33)
- Place of birth: Buenos Aires, Argentina
- Height: 1.68 m (5 ft 6 in)
- Position: Goalkeeper

Team information
- Current team: RSC Anderlecht Futsal
- Number: 1

Senior career*
Years	Team	Apps	(Gls)
2011–2014	River Plate		
2014–2015	Intelli Orlandia		
2015–2020	Palma		
2020–2023	Real Betis		
2023–2024	Noia FS		
2024–2025	RSC Anderlecht Futsal		
2025-	ASD Roma 1927 Futsal		

International career^{‡}
2014–	Argentina		
Medal record
Representing Argentina
Men's Futsal
FIFA Futsal World Cup
Gold medal – first place	2016 Colombia
Silver medal – second place	2021 Lithuania
Silver medal – second place	2024 Uzbekistan
- * Club domestic league appearances and goals as of 2 October 2016 ‡ National team caps and goals as of 2 October 2016

Nicolás Sarmiento (born 3 December 1992) is an Argentine professional futsal player who plays as a goalkeeper for Italian club ASD Roma 1927 Futsal in the Italian Futsal Serie A Campionato italiano maschile di calcio a 5 and the Argentine national futsal team.

In 2016, he won the FIFA Futsal World Cup and was awarded the competition's Golden Glove. He won the FIFA Futsal World Cup Golden Glove again in 2021, but lost in the final with Argentina.

== Honours ==
=== Club ===
Anderlecht

- Belgian Futsal Division 1: 2024–25
- Belgian Cup: 2024–25

=== National team ===
- FIFA Futsal World Cup: 2016
- Copa América de Futsal: 2022

=== Individual ===
- FIFA Futsal World Cup Golden Glove: 2016
- FIFA Futsal World Cup Golden Glove: 2021
