= Marlon Araújo =

Brazilian futsal player

Personal information
- Full name: Marlon Oliveira Araújo
- Date of birth: 28 December 1987 (age 38)
- Place of birth: Nova Santa Rita, Brazil
- Height: 1.78 m (5 ft 10 in)
- Position: Defender

Team information
- Current team: Palma
- Number: 10

Youth career
- 2003–2004: CEPE Canoas
- 2005–2007: Ulbra

Senior career*
Years	Team	Apps	(Gls)
2008	CR Vasco da Gama		
2008–2009	Francisco Beltrão		
2009–2011	Intelli		
2012	Carlos Barbosa		
2013	Keima Futsal		
2014	Copagril		
2015–2018	Carlos Barbosa		
2019–2020	Inter FS		
2020–2023	Palma		
2023–	ElPozo Murcia		

International career
- Brazil
- * Club domestic league appearances and goals as of 00:00, 22 January 2022 (UTC)

Marlon Oliveira Araújo (born 28 December 1987) is a Brazilian futsal player who plays as a defender for ElPozo Murcia and the Brazilian national futsal team.

== Honours ==
National team

- FIFA Futsal World Cup: 2024 - (champion)

Individual

- 2024 FIFA Futsal World Cup Silver Ball
