= Dyego Zuffo =

Brazilian futsal player

Personal information
- Full name: Dyego Henrique Zuffo
- Date of birth: 5 August 1989 (age 37)
- Place of birth: Palmitos, Brazil
- Height: 1.78 m (5 ft 10 in)
- Position: Winger

Team information
- Current team: Barcelona
- Number: 7

Senior career*
Years	Team	Apps	(Gls)
2009–2012	Copagril		
2013	Joinville		
2013–	Barcelona		

International career^{‡}
2010–	Brazil		
- * Club domestic league appearances and goals as of 00:00, 17 January 2019 (UTC) ‡ National team caps and goals as of 00:00, 17 January 2019 (UTC)

Dyego Henrique Zuffo (born 5 August 1989) is a Brazilian futsal player who plays as a winger for FC Barcelona and the Brazilian national futsal team.

== Honours ==
Clubs

- UEFA Futsal Champions League third place: 2018–19

Brazil

- FIFA Futsal World Cup: 2024

Individual

- 2024 FIFA Futsal World Cup Golden Ball
- Best Player in the World: 2024
