= Kevin Arrieta =

Argentine futsal player (born 1997)

Personal information
- Full name: Kevin Nahuel Arrieta
- Date of birth: 16 February 1997 (age 29)
- Place of birth: Buenos Aires, Argentina
- Position: Winger

Senior career*
Years	Team	Apps	(Gls)
2016–2017	Racing		
2017–2018	Boca Juniors		
2018–2020	Feldi Eboli		
2020–2021	Ferro Carril Oeste		
2021–2022	Servigroup Peñíscola		
2023–2024	Barracas Central		
2024–2024	Nitida Alzira		
2024–2025	AFC Kairat		
2025–	Pirossigeno Cosenza		

International career
2024–	Argentina	7	(7)
- * Club domestic league appearances and goals

Kevin Nahuel Arrieta (born 16 February 1997) is an Argentine professional futsal player who plays as a winger.

== Career ==
Called up to replace Andrés Geraghty, who was injured, Arrieta became Argentina's highlight in the 2024 FIFA Futsal World Cup, having outstanding performances especially against France, in the semi-finals. The athlete stood out for his accurate penalty kicks from the second mark, which gave him the mark of seven goals in the competition and the award of the Bronze Boot.

Since 11 July 2024 he has represented Nitida Alzira, from Spain.

== Personal life ==
Arrieta's older brothers, Juan and Oscar, are also futsal players.

== Honours ==
Individual

- 2024 FIFA Futsal World Cup Bronze Boot: 7 goals
