= FIFA Futsal World Cup =

Futsal tournament for national teams

- The trophy awarded since 2012
- Organiser(s): FIFA
- Founded: 1989; 37 years ago
- Region: International
- Teams: 24 (finals)
- Related competitions: FIFA Futsal Women's World Cup
- Current champions: Brazil (6th title)
- Most championships: Brazil (6 titles)
- Website: fifa.com/futsalworldcup
- 2028 FIFA Futsal World Cup

The FIFA Futsal World Cup is an international futsal competition contested by the senior men's national teams of the member associations of FIFA, the sport's global governing body. Since the first edition that took place in 1989 in the Netherlands, the tournament has been held every four years in a leap year format since November 1992 in the even-numbered years between two 11-a-side World Cups.

The current champions are Brazil, who won their sixth world title after beating rivals Argentina in the final of the 2024 tournament in Uzbekistan.

All events prior to 2008 were 16-team events. The first event featured 6 teams from Europe, 3 from South America, 2 from Africa, 2 from Asia, 2 from North and Central America and 1 from Oceania. Since 2012, it includes 24 teams split to a six group round-robin tournament with four teams in each group. The top two teams in each group, together with the 4 highest-ranked third-place finishers, advanced to a sixteen-team knockout stage.

== History ==
The first international futsal confederation, the South American Futsal Confederation, was formed in 1965 and consisted of 5 nations (Uruguay, Paraguay, Peru, Argentina, and Brazil). FIFA recognized it as a new discipline unofficially in 1986 and officially in 1988.

== Qualification ==
24 national teams appear in the final tournament. 23 countries, including the defending champion, have to qualify in the continental competitions of the six confederations. The host country automatically qualifies.

Confederation	Championship
AFC (Asia)	AFC Futsal Asian Cup
CAF (Africa)	Futsal Africa Cup of Nations
CONCACAF (North, Central America and Caribbean)	CONCACAF Futsal Championship
CONMEBOL (South America)	Copa América de Futsal
UEFA (Europe)	FIFA Futsal World Cup qualification (UEFA)
OFC (Oceania)	OFC Futsal Championship

== Results ==
Keys

- aet: after extra time
- p: penalty shoot-out

Ed.	Year	Host	Final			Third place game			Num. teams
Ed.	Year	Host	(gold) Champions	Score	(silver) Runners-up	(bronze) Third place	Score	Fourth place	Num. teams
1	1989	Netherlands	Brazil	2–1	Netherlands	United States	3–2 (a.e.t.)	Belgium	16
2	1992	Hong Kong	Brazil	4–1	United States	Spain	9–6	Iran	16
3	1996	Spain	Brazil	6–4	Spain	Russia	3–2	Ukraine	16
4	2000	Guatemala	Spain	4–3	Brazil	Portugal	4–2	Russia	16
5	2004	Taiwan	Spain	2–1	Italy	Brazil	7–4	Argentina	16
6	2008	Brazil	Brazil	2–2 (a.e.t.) (4–3 p)	Spain	Italy	2–1	Russia	20
7	2012	Thailand	Brazil	3–2 (a.e.t.)	Spain	Italy	3–0	Colombia	24
8	2016	Colombia	Argentina	5–4	Russia	Iran	2–2 (4–3 p)	Portugal	24
9	2021 (Note: Originally scheduled for 2020. Delayed one year due to the COVID-19 pandemic.)	Lithuania	Portugal	2–1	Argentina	Brazil	4–2	Kazakhstan	24
10	2024	Uzbekistan	Brazil	2–1	Argentina	Ukraine	7–1	France	24
11	2028								24

== Debut of national teams ==
Year	Debuting teams		
Year	Teams	No.	Cum.
1989	Algeria, Argentina, Australia, Belgium, Brazil, Canada, Denmark, Hungary, Italy, Japan, Netherlands, Paraguay, Saudi Arabia, Spain, United States, Zimbabwe	16	16
1992	China, Costa Rica, Hong Kong, Iran, Nigeria, Poland, Russia	7	23
1996	Cuba, Egypt, Malaysia, Ukraine, Uruguay	5	28
2000	Croatia, Guatemala, Kazakhstan, Portugal, Thailand	5	33
2004	Chinese Taipei, Czech Republic	2	35
2008	Libya, Solomon Islands	2	37
2012	Colombia, Kuwait, Mexico, Morocco, Panama, Serbia	6	43
2016	Azerbaijan, Mozambique, Uzbekistan, Vietnam	4	47
2021	Angola, Lithuania, Venezuela	3	50
2024	Afghanistan, France, New Zealand, Tajikistan	4	54
2028	TBD	TBA	54

== Overall team records ==
In this ranking 3 points are awarded for a win, 1 for a draw and 0 for a loss. As per statistical convention in football, matches decided in extra time are counted as wins and losses, while matches decided by penalty shoot-outs are counted as draws. Teams are ranked by total points, then by goal difference, then by goals scored.

As of 2024 FIFA Futsal World Cup

Rank	Team	Part	M	W	D	L	GF	GA	GD	Points
1	Brazil	10	74	64	6	4	468	107	+361	198
2	Spain	10	65	50	6	9	277	122	+155	156
3	Argentina	10	62	36	7	19	193	136	+57	115
4	Russia	7	45	27	5	13	241	114	+127	86
5	Italy	7	43	27	3	13	153	96	+57	84
6	Portugal	7	41	25	6	10	144	82	+62	81
7	Iran	9	44	22	6	16	160	144	+16	72
8	Ukraine	6	37	19	5	13	138	100	+38	62
9	Netherlands	5	30	13	7	10	87	86	+1	46
10	Paraguay	8	33	13	5	15	108	99	+9	44
11	United States	6	32	12	4	16	91	108	−17	40
12	Belgium	3	20	10	2	8	56	51	+5	32
13	Kazakhstan	4	19	9	3	7	65	50	+15	30
14	Egypt	7	28	10	0	18	97	115	−18	30
15	Thailand	7	26	8	1	17	71	122	−51	25
16	Czech Republic	4	18	6	2	10	37	53	−16	20
17	Morocco	4	16	5	2	9	40	51	−11	17
18	Costa Rica	6	20	5	2	13	48	88	−40	17
19	Colombia	2	11	4	3	4	27	25	+2	15
20	Guatemala	6	19	5	0	14	58	110	−52	15
21	Japan	5	18	4	2	12	47	77	−30	14
22	Uruguay	3	13	4	1	8	30	39	−9	13
23	Venezuela	2	9	4	1	4	23	32	−9	13
24	Australia	7	21	4	1	16	34	118	−84	13
25	France	1	7	4	0	3	24	23	+1	12
26	Croatia	2	10	4	0	6	27	27	0	12
27	Serbia	2	8	3	1	4	27	18	+9	10
28	Panama	4	13	3	0	10	36	77	−41	9
29	Hungary	1	6	2	2	2	23	17	+6	8
30	Azerbaijan	1	5	2	1	2	25	18	+7	7
31	Vietnam	2	8	2	1	5	12	33	−21	7
32	Poland	1	6	2	0	4	15	22	−7	6
33	Uzbekistan	3	10	1	2	7	28	42	−14	5
34	Denmark	1	3	1	1	1	12	10	+2	4
35	Libya	3	10	1	1	8	14	49	−35	4
36	Canada	1	3	1	0	2	7	7	0	3
36	Hong Kong	1	3	1	0	2	7	7	0	3
38	Afghanistan	1	4	1	0	3	9	13	−4	3
39	Kuwait	1	3	1	0	2	8	13	−5	3
40	Cuba	6	16	1	0	15	29	118	−89	3
41	Solomon Islands	4	13	1	0	12	22	142	−120	3
42	Nigeria	1	3	0	0	3	7	15	−8	0
42	Tajikistan	1	3	0	0	3	7	15	−8	0
44	Lithuania	1	3	0	0	3	3	11	−8	0
45	Mexico	1	3	0	0	3	4	13	−9	0
46	Zimbabwe	1	3	0	0	3	3	14	−11	0
47	Algeria	1	3	0	0	3	5	17	−12	0
48	Mozambique	1	3	0	0	3	7	22	−15	0
49	New Zealand	1	3	0	0	3	2	20	−18	0
50	Malaysia	1	3	0	0	3	4	24	−20	0
51	Angola	2	6	0	0	6	17	38	−21	0
52	Saudi Arabia	1	3	0	0	3	4	27	−23	0
53	Chinese Taipei	1	3	0	0	3	2	29	−27	0
54	China	3	10	0	0	10	15	66	−51	0

== Medal table ==
Rank	Nation	Gold	Silver	Bronze	Total
1	Brazil	6	1	2	9
2	Spain	2	3	1	6
3	Argentina	1	2	0	3
4	Portugal	1	0	1	2
5	Italy	0	1	2	3
6	Russia	0	1	1	2
6	United States	0	1	1	2
8	Netherlands	0	1	0	1
9	Iran	0	0	1	1
9	Ukraine	0	0	1	1
Totals (10 entries)		10	10	10	30

== Comprehensive team results by tournament ==
Legend

- 1st — Champions
- 2nd — Runners-up
- 3rd — Third place
- 4th — Fourth place
- QF — Quarterfinals
- R2 — Round 2 (1989–2008: second group stage, top 8; 2012–present: knockout round of 16)
- R1 — Round 1 (1989–2008: first group stage; 2012–present: group stage)
- × — Did not enter / Withdrew / Banned
- Q — Qualified for upcoming tournament
- — Hosts

Nation	1989 (Netherlands)	1992 (British Hong Kong)	1996 (Spain)	2000 (Guatemala)	2004 (Taiwan)	2008 (Brazil)	2012 (Thailand)	2016 (Colombia)	2021 (Lithuania)	2024 (Uzbekistan)	2028	Total
Afghanistan										R2		1
Algeria	R1											1
Angola									R1	R1		2
Argentina	R2	R2	R1	R2	4th	R2	QF	1st	2nd	2nd		10
Australia	R1	R1	R1	R1	R1		R1	R1				7
Azerbaijan								QF				1
Belgium	4th	R2	R2									3
Brazil	1st	1st	1st	2nd	3rd	1st	1st	R2	3rd	1st		10
Canada	R1											1
China		R1	R1			R1						3
Chinese Taipei					R1							1
Colombia							4th	R2				2
Costa Rica		R1		R1			R1	R2	R1	R2		6
Croatia				R2						R2		2
Cuba			R1	R1	R1	R1		R1		R1		6
Czech Republic					R2	R1	R2		R2			4
Denmark	R1											1
Egypt			R1	R2	R1	R1	R2	QF	R1			7
France										4th		1
Guatemala				R1		R1	R1	R1	R1	R1		6
Hong Kong		R1										1
Hungary	R2											1
Iran		4th	R1	R1	R1	R2	R2	3rd	QF	R2		9
Italy	R2	R1	R2		2nd	3rd	3rd	R2				7
Japan	R1				R1	R1	R2		R2			5
Kazakhstan				R1				R2	4th	QF		4
Kuwait							R1					1
Libya						R1	R1			R1		3
Lithuania									R1			1
Malaysia			R1									1
Mexico							R1					1
Morocco							R1	R1	QF	QF		4
Mozambique								R1				1
Netherlands	2nd	R2	R2	R2						R2		5
New Zealand										R1		1
Nigeria		R1								×		1
Panama							R2	R1	R1	R1		4
Paraguay	R2	R1			R1	R2	R2	QF	R2	QF		8
Poland		R2										1
Portugal				3rd	R2	R1	QF	4th	1st	R2		7
Russia		R1	3rd	4th		4th	QF	2nd	QF	×		7
Saudi Arabia	R1											1
Serbia							R2		R2			2
Solomon Islands						R1	R1	R1	R1			4
Spain	R1	3rd	2nd	1st	1st	2nd	2nd	QF	QF	R2		10
Tajikistan										R1		1
Thailand				R1	R1	R1	R2	R2	R2	R2		7
Ukraine			4th		R2	R2	QF	R2		3rd		6
United States	3rd	2nd	R1		R2	R1			R1			6
Uruguay			R2	R1		R1						3
Uzbekistan								R1	R2	R1		3
Venezuela									R2	QF		2
Vietnam								R2	R2			2
Zimbabwe	R1									×		1
Nations	16	16	16	16	16	20	24	24	24	24	24	

== Results of host nations ==
Year	Host nation	Finish
1989	Netherlands	Runners-up
1992	Hong Kong	Group stage
1996	Spain	Runners-up
2000	Guatemala	Group stage
2004	Taiwan	Group stage
2008	Brazil	Champions
2012	Thailand	Round of 16
2016	Colombia	Round of 16
2021	Lithuania	Group stage
2024	Uzbekistan	Group stage

== Results of defending champions ==
Year	Defending champions	Finish
1992	Brazil	Champions
1996	Brazil	Champions
2000	Brazil	Runners-up
2004	Spain	Champions
2008	Spain	Runners-up
2012	Brazil	Champions
2016	Brazil	Round of 16
2021	Argentina	Runners-up
2024	Portugal	Round of 16
2028	Brazil	TBD

== Result by confederation ==
=== AFC ===
	1989 (Netherlands) (16)	1992 (Hong Kong) (16)	1996 (Spain) (16)	2000 (Guatemala) (16)	2004 (Taiwan) (16)	2008 (Brazil) (20)	2012 (Thailand) (24)	2016 (Colombia) (24)	2021 (Lithuania) (24)	2024 (Uzbekistan) (24)	2028 (24)	Total
Teams	2	3	3	3	4	4	5	5	5	5	5	44
Top 16	—	—	—	—	—	—	3	3	5	3		14
Top 8	0	1	0	0	0	1	0	1	1	0		4
Top 4	0	1	0	0	0	0	0	1	0	0		2
Top 2	0	0	0	0	0	0	0	0	0	0		0
1st												0
2nd												0
3rd								(Iran)				1
4th		(Iran)										1

=== CAF ===
	1989 (Netherlands) (16)	1992 (Hong Kong) (16)	1996 (Spain) (16)	2000 (Guatemala) (16)	2004 (Taiwan) (16)	2008 (Brazil) (20)	2012 (Thailand) (24)	2016 (Colombia) (24)	2021 (Lithuania) (24)	2024 (Uzbekistan) (24)	2028 (24)	Total
Teams	2	1	1	1	1	2	3	3	3	3	3	23
Top 16	—	—	—	—	—	—	1	1	1	1		4
Top 8	0	0	0	1	0	0	0	1	1	1		4
Top 4	0	0	0	0	0	0	0	0	0	0		0
Top 2	0	0	0	0	0	0	0	0	0	0		0
1st												0
2nd												0
3rd												0
4th												0

=== CONCACAF ===
	1989 (Netherlands) (16)	1992 (Hong Kong) (16)	1996 (Spain) (16)	2000 (Guatemala) (16)	2004 (Taiwan) (16)	2008 (Brazil) (20)	2012 (Thailand) (24)	2016 (Colombia) (24)	2021 (Lithuania) (24)	2024 (Uzbekistan) (24)	2028 (24)	Total
Teams	2	2	2	3	2	3	4	4	4	4	4	34
Top 16	—	—	—	—	—	—	1	1	0	1		3
Top 8	1	1	0	0	1	0	0	0	0	0		3
Top 4	1	1	0	0	0	0	0	0	0	0		2
Top 2	0	1	0	0	0	0	0	0	0	0		1
1st												0
2nd		(United States)										1
3rd	(United States)											1
4th												0

=== CONMEBOL ===
	1989 (Netherlands) (16)	1992 (Hong Kong) (16)	1996 (Spain) (16)	2000 (Guatemala) (16)	2004 (Taiwan) (16)	2008 (Brazil) (20)	2012 (Thailand) (24)	2016 (Colombia) (24)	2021 (Lithuania) (24)	2024 (Uzbekistan) (24)	2028 (24)	Total
Teams	3	3	3	3	3	4	4	4	4	4	4	39
Top 16	—	—	—	—	—	—	4	4	4	4		16
Top 8	3	2	2	2	2	3	3	2	2	4		25
Top 4	1	1	1	1	2	1	2	1	2	2		14
Top 2	1	1	1	1	0	1	1	1	1	2		8
1st	(Brazil)	(Brazil)	(Brazil)			(Brazil)	(Brazil)	(Argentina)		(Brazil)		7
2nd				(Brazil)					(Argentina)	(Argentina)		3
3rd					(Brazil)				(Brazil)			2
4th					(Argentina)		(Colombia)					2

=== OFC ===
	1989 (Netherlands) (16)	1992 (Hong Kong) (16)	1996 (Spain) (16)	2000 (Guatemala) (16)	2004 (Taiwan) (16)	2008 (Brazil) (20)	2012 (Thailand) (24)	2016 (Colombia) (24)	2021 (Lithuania) (24)	2024 (Uzbekistan) (24)	2028 (24)	Total
Teams	1	1	1	1	1	1	1	1	1	1	1	11
Top 16	—	—	—	—	—	—	0	0	0	0		0
Top 8	0	0	0	0	0	0	0	0	0	0		0
Top 4	0	0	0	0	0	0	0	0	0	0		0
Top 2	0	0	0	0	0	0	0	0	0	0		0
1st												0
2nd												0
3rd												0
4th												0

=== UEFA ===
	1989 (Netherlands) (16)	1992 (Hong Kong) (16)	1996 (Spain) (16)	2000 (Guatemala) (16)	2004 (Taiwan) (16)	2008 (Brazil) (20)	2012 (Thailand) (24)	2016 (Colombia) (24)	2021 (Lithuania) (24)	2024 (Uzbekistan) (24)	2028 (24)	Total
Teams	6	6	6	5	5	6	7	7	7	7	7	69
Top 16	—	—	—	—	—	—	7	7	6	7		27
Top 8	4	4	6	5	5	4	5	4	3	3		43
Top 4	2	1	3	3	2	3	2	2	2	2		22
Top 2	1	0	1	1	2	1	1	1	1	0		9
1st				(Spain)	(Spain)				(Portugal)			3
2nd	(Netherlands)		(Spain)		(Italy)	(Spain)	(Spain)	(Russia)				6
3rd		(Spain)	(Russia)	(Portugal)		(Italy)	(Italy)			(Ukraine)		6
4th	(Belgium)		(Ukraine)	(Russia)		(Russia)		(Portugal)	(Kazakhstan)	(France)		7

== Goal-scoring leaders ==
=== All-time ===
Rank	Name	Country	Goals	Matches	Tournaments	Goals per match
1	Falcão	Brazil	48	33	2000, 2004, 2008, 2012, 2016	1.45
2	Manoel Tobias	Brazil	43	32	1992, 1996, 2000, 2004	1.34
3	Konstantin Eremenko	Russia	28	18	1992, 1996, 2000	1.56
4	Schumacher	Brazil	25	25	2000, 2004, 2008	1.00
5	Ricardinho	Portugal	22	18	2008, 2012, 2016, 2021	1.43
6	Éder Lima	Russia	19	12	2012, 2016	1.58
7	Pula	Russia	18	14	2008, 2012	1.29
8	Saeid Rajabi	Iran	17	8	1992	2.13
9	Índio	Brazil	15	16	2000, 2004	0.94
9	Suphawut Thueanklang	Thailand	15	16	2012, 2016, 2021, 2024	0.94
10	Daniel	Spain	14	15	2000, 2008	0.93

=== Individual tournament ===
Year	Player	Goals
1989	(Hungary) László Zsadányi	7
1992	(Iran) Saeid Rajabi	17
1996	(Brazil) Manoel Tobias	14
2000	(Brazil) Manoel Tobias	19
2004	(Brazil) Falcão	13
2008	(Russia) Pula	16
2012	(Russia) Éder Lima	9
2016	(Portugal) Ricardinho	12
2021	(Brazil) Ferrão	9
2024	(Brazil) Marcel	10

== Awards ==
=== Golden Ball ===
The Adidas Golden Ball award is awarded to the player who plays the most outstanding football during the tournament. It is selected by the media poll.

World Cup	Golden Ball	Silver Ball	Bronze Ball
2008 Brazil	(Brazil) Falcão	(Brazil) Schumacher	(Brazil) Tiago
2012 Thailand	(Brazil) Neto	(Spain) Kike	(Portugal) Ricardinho
2016 Colombia	(Argentina) Fernando Wilhelm	(Russia) Éder Lima	(Iran) Ahmad Esmaeilpour
2021 Lithuania	(Portugal) Ricardinho	(Portugal) Pany Varela	(Kazakhstan) Douglas Júnior
2024 Uzbekistan	(Brazil) Dyego	(Brazil) Marlon	(Ukraine) Rostyslav Semenchenko

=== Golden Shoe ===
The adidas Golden Shoe is awarded to the top scorer of the tournament. If more than one players are equal by same goals, the players will be selected based by the most assists during the tournament.

World Cup	Golden Shoe	Goals	Silver Shoe	Goals	Bronze Shoe	Goals
2008 Brazil	(Russia) Pula	16	(Brazil) Falcão	15	(Brazil) Lenísio	11
2012 Thailand	(Russia) Éder Lima	9	(Italy) Rodolfo Fortino	8	(Brazil) Fernandinho	7
2016 Colombia	(Portugal) Ricardinho	12	(Russia) Éder Lima	10	(Brazil) Falcão	10
2021 Lithuania	(Brazil) Ferrão	9	(Portugal) Pany Varela	8	(Kazakhstan) Taynan da Silva	6
2024 Uzbekistan	(Brazil) Marcel	10	(Ukraine) Danyil Abakshyn	7	(Argentina) Kevin Arrieta	7

=== Golden Glove ===
The Golden Glove Award is awarded to the best goalkeeper of the tournament.

World Cup	Golden Glove
2008 Brazil	(Brazil) Tiago
2012 Thailand	(Italy) Stefano Mammarella
2016 Colombia	(Argentina) Nicolás Sarmiento
2021 Lithuania	(Argentina) Nicolás Sarmiento
2024 Uzbekistan	(Brazil) Willian

=== Goal of the Tournament ===
Goal of the Tournament is awarded to the best goal of the tournament.

Tournament	Goal of the Tournament
2008 Brazil	(Guatemala) José Rafael Gonzalez
2012 Thailand	(Thailand) Suphawut Thueanklang
2016 Colombia	(Thailand) Suphawut Thueanklang
2021 Lithuania	(Vietnam) Nguyễn Văn Hiếu
2024 Uzbekistan	Not awarded

=== FIFA Fair Play Award ===
FIFA Fair Play Award is given to the team who has the best fair play record during the tournament with the criteria set by FIFA Fair Play Committee.

Tournament	FIFA Fair Play Award
1989 Netherlands	United States
1992 Hong Kong	United States
1996 Spain	Not awarded
2000 Guatemala	Not awarded
2004 Chinese Taipei	Not awarded
2008 Brazil	Spain
2012 Thailand	Argentina
2016 Colombia	Vietnam
2021 Lithuania	Kazakhstan
2024 Uzbekistan	Portugal

=== FIFA Champions Badge ===
In 2012, FIFA extended the FIFA Champions Badge to the winners of the competition, where it was first won by Brazil.

== Winning coaches ==
Year	Team	Coach
1989	Brazil	(Brazil) Gerson Tristão
1992	Brazil	(Brazil) Eustáquio Afonso Araújo
1996	Brazil	(Brazil) Eustáquio Afonso Araújo
2000	Spain	(Spain) Javier Lozano
2004	Spain	(Spain) Javier Lozano
2008	Brazil	(Brazil) PC de Oliveira
2012	Brazil	(Brazil) Marcos Aurélio Sorato
2016	Argentina	(Argentina) Diego Giustozzi
2021	Portugal	(Portugal) Jorge Braz
2024	Brazil	(Brazil) Marquinhos Xavier

== Team records ==
=== All time ===
Most matches played
74; Brazil
Most wins
64; Brazil
Most losses
19; Argentina
Most draws
7; Argentina, Netherlands
Most goals scored
468; Brazil
Most goals conceded
144; Iran
Fewest goals scored
2; New Zealand, Chinese Taipei
Fewest goals conceded
7; Canada, Hong Kong
Highest goal difference
+361; Brazil
Lowest goal difference
–120; Solomon Islands
Most played final
4 times; Brazil v Spain (1996, 2000, 2008, 2012)

=== Goalscoring ===
Biggest margin of victory
29; Russia, vs Solomon Islands (2008)
Most goals scored in a match, one team
31; Russia, vs Solomon Islands (2008)
Most goals scored in a match, both teams
33; Russia 31–2 Solomon Islands (2008)
Most goals scored in a final, one team
6; Brazil (1996)
Most goals scored in a final, both teams
10; Brazil 6–4 Spain (1996)
Fewest goals scored in a final, both teams
3; Brazil 2–1 Netherlands (1989), Spain 2–1 Italy (2004), Portugal 2–1 Argentina (2021), Brazil 2–1 Argentina (2024)
Biggest margin of victory in a final
3; Brazil (1992)

== Predecessors ==
- FIFA Futsal Tournament in 1986 (1) and 1987 (2)
- World University Futsal Championships

== See also ==
- AMF Futsal World Cup
- Futsal Confederations Cup
- Women's Futsal World Tournament
- FIFA Women's Futsal World Cup
- FIFA Beach Soccer World Cup

== Notes ==
1. For continuity purposes the results of the Russian team at the 2021 tournament, where it participated as "RFU" (Russian Football Union) and under the flag of the Russian Olympic Committee in accordance with doping sanctions imposed on the country, are counted towards Russia's totals.
