= Brazil national futsal team =

National sports team

Brazil
- Shirt badge/Association crest
- Nickname(s): Seleção (The National Team); Verde-Amarela (The Green and Yellow); Canarinha (The Canary)
- Association: Confederação Brasileira de Futebol (CBF) (Note: Between 1979 and 2021, the organizing unit of the national team was the Brazilian Futsal Confederation (CBFS). As of 2021, the Brazilian Football Confederation (CBF) will take over the management of the sport, while CBFS will be responsible for organizing championships.)
- Confederation: CONMEBOL (South America)
- Head coach: Marquinhos Xavier
- Captain: Dyego
- Most caps: Falcão (258)
- Top scorer: Falcão (401)
- Home stadium: Various
- FIFA code: BRA
- FIFA ranking: 1 (24 September 2026)
- Highest FIFA ranking: 1 (May 2024 – April 2025)
Home colours	Away colours

First international
- Brazil 1–2 Italy (Budapest, Hungary; 18 November 1986)

Biggest win
- Brazil 76–0 Timor-Leste (Cotai, Macau; 13 October 2006) (World record for senior international matches)

Biggest defeat
- Brazil 1–6 Netherlands (Genk, Belgium; 23 May 1988)

FIFA World Cup
- Appearances: 10 (First in 1989)
- Best result: Champions (1989, 1992, 1996, 2008, 2012, 2024)

AMF World Cup
- Appearances: 11 (First in 1982)
- Best result: Champions (1982, 1985)

South American Futsal Championship
- Appearances: 23 (First in 1965)
- Best result: Champions (12 times, most recently in 2026)

Confederations Cup
- Appearances: 2 (First in 2013)
- Best result: Champions (2013)

Grand Prix de Futsal
- Appearances: 11 (First in 2005)
- Best result: Champions (2005, 2006, 2007, 2008, 2009, 2011, 2013, 2014, 2015, 2018)

The Brazil national futsal team represents its nation in international futsal competitions. It is under the direction of the Brazilian Football Confederation (CBF). Its national team is considered to be the strongest in the world earning a record three straight championships and six overall in the FIFA Futsal World Cup. The 'Canarinha' also holds a record twelve championship wins in the South American Futsal Championship also known as the Copa América de Futsal and five wins in the Taça América de Futsal. From its first oficial publishing by FIFA in September 2024 to 2026, the Brazilian team is ranked first in the Futsal World Rankings. Its squad has played in all 10 FIFA Futsal World Cups and has finished in the top three nine times, reaching the finals seven times and winning six titles, which includes the recent Futsal World Cup in 2024. The team has the best overall performance in the World Cup and the Copa America competitions both in proportional and absolute terms. As of 2026, Brazilian team has a winning record against every nation they have faced in their history, winning over 89% of the matches and losing 5% of them.

== History ==
Ever since the early days of the FIFA Futsal World Cup, Brazil have been a force to be reckoned with on the international scene. The 'Verde-Amarela' claimed the trophy at the first three editions of the showpiece event, at Netherlands 1989, Hong Kong 1992 and Spain 1996, but were outstripped by their futsal bête noire, Spain. La Furia Roja proved to be too strong for Brazil in the final of Guatemala 2000 and at the semi-final stage of Taiwan 2004, where they went on to take the title once more. Brazil won their 4th and 5th titles in Brazil 2008 and Thailand 2012, beating Spain in the finals of these two editions respectively. They are known for defeating East Timor 76–0 in the 2006 Lusophony Games in Macau.

== Results ==
The following is a list of match results in the last 12 months, as well as any future matches that have been scheduled.

Legend

Win Draw Lose Fixture

=== 2024 ===
14 September 2024 FIFA Futsal World Cup GS Group B	Brazil	10–0	Cuba	Bukhara, Uzbekistan
	Marcel 01'18", 22'25", 32'54"; Neguinho 10'41"; Marlon 12'16", 22'52", 38'40"; Felipe Valério 12'46"; Pito 24'06"; Arthur 27'30"	Report		Stadium: Bukhara Universal Sports Complex; Attendance: 2,045; Referee: Ondřej Černý (Czech Republic)

17 September 2024 FIFA Futsal World Cup GS Group B	Brazil	8–1	Croatia	Bukhara, Uzbekistan
	Pito 12'34", 24'17"; Dyego 16'17" (2pen.); Marcel 17'08", 23'13"; Neguinho 18'14"; Arthur 28'43"; Rafa Santos 36'35"	Report	Marinović 14'12"	Stadium: Bukhara Universal Sports Complex; Attendance: 2,382; Referee: Ebrahim Mehrabi Afshar (Iran)

20 September 2024 FIFA Futsal World Cup GS Group B	Thailand	1–9	Brazil	Bukhara, Uzbekistan
	Osamanmusa 19'18"	Report	Marcel 05'37", 19'29", 35'03"; Felipe Valério 10'00"; Pito 22'12", 30'33"; Marlon 23'25"; Wongkaeo 26'00" (o.g.); Ferrão 36'47"	Stadium: Bukhara Universal Sports Complex; Attendance: 2,040; Referee: Diego Molina (Costa Rica)

24 September 2024 FIFA Futsal World Cup Round of 16	Brazil	5–0	Costa Rica	Bukhara, Uzbekistan
				Stadium: Bukhara Universal Sports Complex

29 September 2024 FIFA Futsal World Cup Quarter-finals	Brazil	3–1	Morocco	Bukhara, Uzbekistan
				Stadium: Bukhara Universal Sports Complex

2 October 2024 FIFA Futsal World Cup Semi-finals	Ukraine	2–3	Brazil	Tashkent, Uzbekistan
				Stadium: Humo Arena

6 October 2024 FIFA Futsal World Cup Final	Brazil	2–1	Argentina	Tashkent, Uzbekistan
				Stadium: Humo Arena

== Team ==
=== Current squad ===
The following players were called up to the Brazil squad for the 2024 FIFA Futsal World Cup. Head coach: Marquinhos Xavier

No.	Pos.	Player	Date of birth (age)	Club
1	GK	Guitta	11 June 1987 (aged 37)	(Russian Football Union) MFK Ukhta
2	GK	Diego Roncáglio	15 July 1988 (aged 36)	(Royal Belgian Football Association) Anderlecht
3	GK	Willian Dorn	16 December 1994 (aged 29)	(Russian Football Union) Norilsk Nickel
4	DF	Marlon	28 December 1987 (aged 36)	(Royal Spanish Football Federation) ElPozo Murcia
5	DF	Neguinho	12 July 2000 (aged 24)	(Royal Spanish Football Federation) Palma Futsal
6	MF	Marcel	26 July 1996 (aged 28)	(Royal Spanish Football Federation) ElPozo Murcia
7	MF	Dyego Zuffo (captain)	5 August 1989 (aged 35)	(Royal Spanish Football Federation) FC Barcelona
8	MF	Marcênio	5 October 1987 (aged 36)	(Brazilian Football Confederation) Jaraguá
9	MF	Leandro Lino	25 July 1995 (aged 29)	(Brazilian Football Confederation) Magnus Futsal
10	FW	Pito	6 November 1991 (aged 32)	(Royal Spanish Football Federation) FC Barcelona
11	FW	Ferrão	29 October 1990 (aged 33)	(Kazakhstan Football Federation) Semey
12	MF	Arthur Guilherme	16 May 1994 (aged 30)	(Portuguese Football Federation) Benfica
13	FW	Rafa Santos	25 September 1990 (aged 33)	(Royal Spanish Football Federation) ElPozo Murcia
14	MF	Felipe Valério	8 July 1993 (aged 31)	(Royal Spanish Football Federation) ElPozo Murcia

=== Notable players ===
- Jackson João Bosco Moreira dos Santos (1979–1988)
- Douglas Pierrotti (1980–1989)
- Eduardo Valdez Basso (1983–1991)
- Raul Cerqueira de Rezende (1985–1990)
- Fininho (1992–2004)
- Jorginho (1991–1996)
- Manoel Tobias (1992–2004)
- Vander (1988–1997)
- Carlos Roberto Castro Silva (1993–1999)
- Lenísio (1999–2012)
- Falcão (1998–2018)

== Competitive record ==
=== FIFA Futsal World Cup ===
FIFA Futsal World Cup record
Years	Round	Position	Pld	W	D	L	GS	GA
(Netherlands) 1989	Champions	1st	8	5	1	2	33	17
(Hong Kong) 1992	Champions	1st	8	7	1	0	44	7
(Spain) 1996	Champions	1st	8	7	1	0	55	16
(Guatemala) 2000	Runners-up	2nd	8	7	0	1	78	14
(Chinese Taipei) 2004	Third place	3rd	8	7	1	0	48	15
(Brazil) 2008	Champions	1st	9	8	1	0	64	8
(Thailand) 2012	Champions	1st	7	7	0	0	45	7
(Colombia) 2016	Round of 16	9th	4	3	1	0	33	9
(Lithuania) 2021	Third place	3rd	7	6	0	1	28	8
(Uzbekistan) 2024	Champions	1st	7	7	0	0	40	6
Total	10/10	6 titles	74	64	6	4	468	107

=== FIFUSA/AMF Futsal World Cup ===
FIFUSA Futsal World Championship record
Year	Round	Position	Pld	W	D	L	GS	GA
(Brazil) 1982	Champions	1st	6	6	0	0	33	3
(Spain) 1985	Champions	1st	6	6	0	0	48	2
(Australia) 1988	Runners-up	2nd	8	7	1	0	75	8
(Italy) 1991	Third place	3rd	9	6	0	3	36	18
(Argentina) 1994	Fourth place	4th	9	5	3	1	35	13
(Mexico) 1997	Third place	3rd	8	6	1	1	26	14
(Bolivia) 2000	Quarter-finals	8th	6	3	1	2	51	15
(Paraguay) 2003	Second round	6th	4	2	1	1	18	6
(Argentina) 2007	did not enter							
(Colombia) 2011	Group stage	9th	3	1	1	1	13	13
(Belarus) 2015	Group stage	10th	3	1	0	2	7	5
(Argentina) 2019	Runners-up	2nd	–	–	–	–	–	–
Total	11/12	2 titles	62	43	8	11	342	97

=== Copa América de Futsal ===
==== South American Futsal Championship (Unofficial) ====
- 1965 – (silver) 2nd place
- 1969 – (gold) Champions
- 1971 – (gold) Champions (host)
- 1973 – (gold) Champions
- 1975 – (gold) Champions
- 1976 – (gold) Champions
- 1977 – (gold) Champions (host)
- 1979 – (gold) Champions
- 1983 – (gold) Champions
- 1986 – (gold) Champions
- 1989 – (gold) Champions (host)

==== Copa América de Futsal ====
- 1992 – (gold) Champions (host)
- 1995 – (gold) Champions (host)
- 1996 – (gold) Champions (host)
- 1997 – (gold) Champions (host)
- 1998 – (gold) Champions (host)
- 1999 – (gold) Champions (host)
- 2000 – (gold) Champions (host)
- 2003 – (silver) 2nd place
- 2008 – (gold) Champions
- 2011 – (gold) Champions
- 2015 – (bronze) 3rd place
- 2017 – (gold) Champions
- 2022 – (bronze) 3rd place
- 2024 – (gold) Champions
- 2026 – (gold) Champions

===== Results =====
#	Team	M	W	D	L	GF	GA	GD
1	1992 CONMEBOL Futsal Championship	3	3	0	0	12	3	+9
2	1995 Taça América de Futsal	3	3	0	0	18	9	+9
3	1996 Taça América de Futsal	4	4	0	0	34	4	+30
4	1997 Taça América de Futsal	4	4	0	0	32	5	+27
5	1998 Taça América de Futsal	4	4	0	0	26	7	+19
6	1999 Taça América de Futsal	4	4	0	0	39	7	+32
7	2000 Taça América de Futsal	4	4	0	0	28	5	+23
8	2003 Copa América de Futsal	5	4	0	1	31	12	+19
9	2008 Copa América de Futsal	5	5	0	0	46	6	+40
10	2011 Copa América de Futsal	5	4	1	0	35	8	+27
11	2015 Copa América de Futsal	5	4	1	0	18	5	+13
12	2017 Copa América de Futsal	6	5	1	0	32	7	+25
13	2022 Copa América de Futsal	6	5	1	0	20	6	+14
14	2024 Copa América de Futsal	6	6	0	0	26	3	+23
Total	14/14	64	59	4	1	397	87	+310

Futsal Finalíssima

. 2026 – (silver) 2nd place

=== FIFA Futsal World Cup qualification (CONMEBOL) ===
- 2012 – (bronze) 3rd place (host)
- 2016 – (gold) Champions
- 2020 – (silver) 2nd place

=== Futsal Confederations Cup ===
- 2009 – Did not enter
- 2013 – Champions (host)
- 2014 – 3rd place

=== Pan American Games ===
- 2007 – Champions (host)

=== Panamerican FIFUSA Championship ===
- 1980 – Champions
- 1984 – Champions (host)
- 1990 – Did not enter
- 1993 – Semi-finals
- 1996 – 4th place
- 1999 – Did not enter

=== South American Games ===
- 2002 – (gold) Champions (host)
- 2006 – (gold) Champions
- 2010 – (gold) Champions
- 2014 – (gold) Champions

=== Grand Prix de Futsal ===
- 2005 – (gold) Champions (host)
- 2006 – (gold) Champions (host)
- 2007 – (gold) Champions (host)
- 2008 – (gold) Champions (host)
- 2009 – (gold) Champions (host)
- 2010 – (silver) 2nd place (host)
- 2011 – (gold) Champions (host)
- 2013 – (gold) Champions (host)
- 2014 – (gold) Champions (host)
- 2015 – (gold) Champions (host)
- 2018 – (gold) Champions (host)

=== Futsal Mundialito ===
- 1995 – (gold) Champions
- 1996 – (gold) Champions
- 1998 – (gold) Champions
- 2007 – (gold) Champions
- 2008 – (gold) Champions

=== Other tournaments ===
Futsal Pyramids Cup

- 2002 – (gold) Champions
- 2003 – (bronze) 3rd place

Futsal World Tournament

- 1986 – 8th place
- 1987 – (bronze) 3rd place
- 1987 – (silver) 2nd place

Lusophony Games

- 2006 – (gold) Champions
- 2009 – (gold) Champions

Futsal Tiger's Cup

- 1997 – (silver) 2nd place
- 1999 – (gold) Champions
- 2001 – (silver) 2nd place

KL World 5's (Futsal, Kuala Lumpur)

- 2003 – (silver) 2nd place
- 2008 – (gold) Champions

IBSA Blind Futsal World Championship

- 1998 – (gold) Champions
- 2000 – (gold) Champions
- 2002 – (bronze) 3rd place
- 2006 – (silver) 2nd place
- 2010 – (gold) Champions

Ho Chi Minh City International Futsal Tournament

- 2013 – (gold) Champions

== Head-to-head record ==
Team	Pld	Win	Drawn*	Lose	GF	GA	Diff
Afghanistan	1	1	0	0	4	1	+3
Angola	4	4	0	0	36	1	+35
Argentina	92	75	9	8	355	108	+247
Australia	7	7	0	0	49	1	+48
Belarus	2	2	0	0	17	0	+17
Belgium	13	11	2	0	61	20	+41
Bolivia	11	11	0	0	76	10	+66
Catalonia	2	2	0	0	8	2	+6
Canada	4	4	0	0	59	3	+56
Cape Verde	1	1	0	0	4	2	+2
Chile	17	17	0	0	136	12	+124
China	4	4	0	0	40	3	+37
Colombia	30	26	4	0	114	39	+75
Comoros	1	1	0	0	5	1	+4
Costa Rica	20	20	0	0	131	16	+115
Croatia	8	8	0	0	47	9	+38
Cuba	5	5	0	0	54	2	+52
Czech Republic	8	8	0	0	49	11	+38
Denmark	2	2	0	0	17	0	+17
Ecuador	19	19	0	0	146	22	+124
Egypt	8	6	1	1	50	18	+32
France	3	2	0	1	16	6	+10
GRL	1	1	0	0	13	0	+13
Guatemala	13	13	0	0	93	14	+79
Guinea-Bissau	1	1	0	0	15	0	+15
Hungary	12	11	0	1	62	16	+46
Indonesia	1	1	0	0	3		+3
Iran	27	24	3	0	132	48	+84
Italy	16	13	2	1	64	23	+41
Japan	23	22	1	0	124	25	+98
Kazakhstan	2	2	0	0	16	3	+13
Kuwait	2	2	0	0	15	1	+14
Libya	5	5	0	0	25	7	+18
Lithuania	2	2	0	0	17	2	+15
Macau	2	2	0	0	65	0	+65
Morocco	6	4	1	1	11	5	+6
Malaysia	1	1	0	0	15	0	+15
Mexico	2	2	0	0	25	2	+23
Mozambique	2	2	0	0	22	3	+19
Netherlands	17	14	0	3	66	28	+38
Panama	2	2	0	0	21	1	+20
Paraguay	50	47	2	1	302	62	+240
Peru	16	15	0	1	95	16	+79
Poland	10	10	0	0	52	14	+38
Portugal	22	18	4	0	85	35	+50
Romania	4	4	0	0	34	5	+29
Russia	17	15	1	1	81	31	+50
São Tomé and Príncipe	1	1	0	0	9	2	+7
Saudi Arabia	2	2	0	0	11	0	+11
Serbia	9	7	1	1	44	17	+25
Singapore	2	2	0	0	45	4	+41
Slovakia	1	1	0	0	5	1	+4
Slovenia	6	6	0	0	28	5	+23
Solomon Islands	2	2	0	0	39	0	+39
South Africa	1	1	0	0	30	0	+30
Spain	33	18	6	9	120	91	+29
Thailand	8	8	0	0	61	6	+55
Timor-Leste	1	1	0	0	76	0	+76
Turkey	1	1	0	0	14	2	+12
Ukraine	16	13	2	1	89	21	+68
United States	13	11	1	1	82	27	+55
Uruguay	40	40	0	0	262	38	+224
Uzbekistan	5	5	0	0	36	4	+32
Venezuela	19	19	0	0	118	16	+102
Vietnam	3	2	0	1	19	5	+14
Zambia	1	1	0	0	11	2	+9
Total	680	608	42	32	4010	854	+3156

== See also ==
- Sport in Brazil
  - Futsal in Brazil
  - Football in Brazil
- Brazil women's national futsal team
- Brazil national football team
- Brazil women's national football team

== Notes ==
Achievements
Preceded by none	World Champions; 1989 (First title); 1992 (Second title); 1996 (Third title)	Succeeded by 2000 Spain
Preceded by 2004 Spain	World Champions; 2008 (Fourth title); 2012 (Fifth title)	Succeeded by 2016 Argentina
