= List of incidents of civil unrest in France =

This is a list of incidents of civil disorder that have occurred in France since the 13th century, including riots, strikes, violent labor disputes, minor insurrections, and other forms of civil unrest.

According to one dataset, there were 8,516 rebellions in France over the period 1661–1789.

== 13th century ==
- 1229: 1229 University of Paris strike, riots at the University of Paris that resulted in a number of student deaths and reforms of the medieval university.
- 1251: Shepherds' Crusade, attacks on monasteries, universities and Jews.
- 1257: Revolt in Marseille
- 1261: Revolt in Marseille
- 1270: Tax revolt in Cahors
- 1274: Revolt in Limoges
- 1276: Revolt in Limoges
- 1281: Revolt in Rouen
- 1292: Tax revolt in Rouen

== 14th century ==
- 1307: Revolt in Paris
- 1309: Crusade of the Poor in northern Europe and notably Picardy, Avignon and Marseille
- 1320: Shepherds' Crusade, widespread violence in France and Aragon
- 1338: Peasant revolt near Laon
- 1347: Tax revolt in Rouen
- 1351: Tax revolt in Rouen
- 1358: Jacquerie peasant revolt in northern France
- 1364: Peasant revolt near Toulouse
- 1378–1384: Tuchin revolt in southern France
- 1378–1382: Tax revolts across France, including the Harelle and Maillotins uprisings in Rouen and Paris

== 15th century ==
- 1407–1435: Armagnac–Burgundian Civil War
  - 1413: Cabochien revolt in Paris
- 1418: Revolt in Châlons-en-Champagne
- 1418: coup d'état and massacres in Paris
- 1440: Praguerie, a noble rebellion
- 1465: League of the Public Weal, a noble rebellion
- 1485–1488: Mad War, a noble rebellion

== 16th century ==
- 1505: Riot in Nîmes
- 1506: Riot in Carcassonne
- 1507: Riot in Nevers
- 1514: Tax revolt in Agen
- 1516: Riot in Laval
- 1519: Revolt in Libourne
- 1521: Peasant revolt in Lantriac and Velay
- 1521: Grain riots in Aix, Marseille and Tarascon
- 1522: Revolt in Meaux
- 1522: Grain riots in Beauvais and Tours
- 1523: Revolt of Captain Montélon in Ile-de-France
- 1525: Riots in Romans
- 1526: Riots in Dijon
- 1526–1527: Peasant riots in Sarladais
- 1528: Wine tax revolt in Bordeaux
- 1529: Grande Rebeyne in Lyon, riots in Dijon and Troyes
- 1535: Riot in Foix
- 1536: Peasant revolt in Provence, tax riot in Le Puy
- 1537: Fighting between gendarmerie and commons in Albi
- 1539: Gabelle salt tax revolt in Bordeaux, tax riot in Vermandois
- 1539–1542: Strikes over printers' wages in Lyon and Paris
- 1542: Gabelle revolt in La Rochelle, riots in Rouen and Tours
- 1544: Revolt over taxes and religion in Saint-Maixent
- 1545: Tax revolts and riots in Niort, Saintes, Périgueux, St Foy, Duras, Rouen and Comminges
- 1545: Mérindol massacre
- 1545–1546: Religious agitation across France
- 1545–1547: Riots in Vitry over real estate speculation
- 1548–1549: Revolt of the Pitauds in south-west France
- 1552: Revolt in Nay
- 1553: Riots in Le Puy
- 1554: Peasant revolt in Normandy
- 1560: Amboise Conspiracy, a failed attempt by Protestant nobles and ministers to seize the King.
- 1560: Maligny Affair: an abortive Protestant uprising in the city of Lyon, backed by nobles and ministers including John Calvin.
- 1561: Saint Médard Riot, a violent religious action in Paris that saw a church seized and more than ten killed.
- 1562–1598: French Wars of Religion
  - 1562: 1562 Riots of Toulouse, a series of events that pitted members of the Reformed Church of France (often called Huguenots) against members of the Roman Catholic Church in violent clashes that ended with the deaths of between 3,000 and 5,000 citizens of the French city of Toulouse.
  - 1572: St. Bartholomew's Day massacre.
  - 1588: Day of the barricades, an uprising by the radical Catholics against the more moderate Henry III.
- 1593–1595: Croquant rebellions in south-west France

== 17th century ==
- 1620: Battle of Ponts-de-Cé, a rebellion by Marie de' Medici is defeated by King Louis XIII.
- 1620–1629: The Huguenot rebellions, a series of southern revolts in part led by Henri, Duke of Rohan in response to increasing reversals of the Edict of Nantes.
- 1624: Peasant rebellion in Quercy
- 1632: Battle of Castelnaudary, a rebellion by Gaston, Duke of Orléans is defeated by royal forces.
- 1635–1637: Croquant rebellions in south-west France
- 1638–1642: Croquant rebellions in south-west France
- 1639: Revolt of the va-nu-pieds, a rebellion in Normandy
- 1643: Croquant rebellions in Rouergue
- 1645: Tax revolt in Montpellier
- 1648–1653: The Fronde, a wave of revolts against the young Louis XIV.
- 1650: Croquant rebellions in Limousin
- 1655–1657: Tardanizat rebellion in Guyenne
- 1658: Sabotiers rebellion in Sologne
- 1661–1662: Benauge rebellion in Guyenne
- 1662: Lustucru rebellion in Boulonnais
- 1663–1665: Audijos rebellion
- 1667–1668: Angelet revolt in Roussillon
- 1670: Vivarais revolt
- 1670–1674: Angelet revolt in Roussillon
- 1675: Revolt of the papier timbré, a rebellion in Brittany
- 1693–1694: Food riots during the Great Famine of 1693–1694
- 1698: Food riots

== 18th century ==
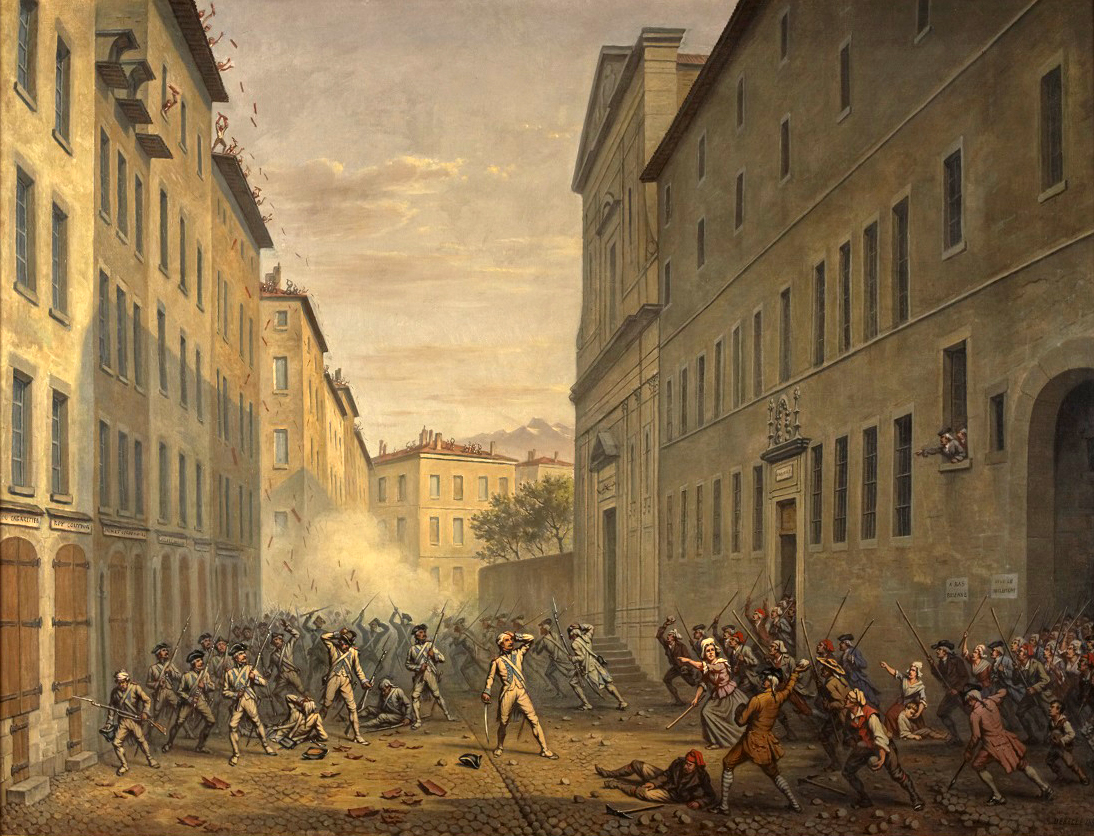
Day of the Tiles in Grenoble (1788), painting by Alexandre Debelle, (Musée de la Révolution française).

- 1702–1710: Camisard Rebellion, a prolonged local guerrilla war by Protestants of the Cévennes region in the wake of the revocation of the Edict of Nantes by Louis XIV.
- 1707: Croquant rebellions in Quercy
- 1709–1710: Food riots during the famine of 1709–1710
- 1718–1720: Pontcallec conspiracy, a rebellion in Brittany
- 1725: Food riot in Paris
- 1739–1740: Food riots
- 1749: Food riots
- 1752: Food riots
- 1768: Food riots
- 1770: Food riots
- 1775: Flour War, a wave of riots in April to May 1775, that followed an increase in grain and bread prices, because police withheld grain from the royal stores in addition to poor harvests.
- 1785: Food riots
- 1786: Révolte des deux sous in Lyon
- 1788: Day of the Tiles in Grenoble
- 1789–1799: French Revolution, a revolution that overthrew the monarchy, established a republic, experienced violent periods of political turmoil, and finally culminated in a dictatorship by Napoleon that forcibly brought many of its ideals to Western Europe.

== 19th century ==
- 1811–1812: Food riot
- 1816–1817: Food riot
- 1829–1830: Food riot
- 1830: The July Revolution, which led to the abdication of Charles X and establishment of the July Monarchy under Louis Philippe I.
- 1831: Canut revolt in Lyon, violent demonstrations in Paris and other cities
- 1832: The June Rebellion, an anti-monarchist insurrection of Parisian republicans on 5 and 6 June 1832. Legitimist insurrections and protests in the west and south. Food riots in the east and southwest.
- 1834: Canut revolt in Lyon
- 1839: Coup attempt in Paris led by Louis Auguste Blanqui, Armand Barbès, Martin Bernard, and the Société des Saisons.
- 1839–1840: Food riots
- 1840: Strikes in Paris
- 1841: Tax revolt in south-west France
- 1845: Wool worker strikes in Lodève
- 1846–1847: Food riots around Paris
- 1848: French Revolution of 1848, street fighting in Paris resulting in the overthrow of the July Monarchy and proclamation of the French Second Republic.
- 1848: French demonstration of 15 May 1848, an event played out in the streets of Paris that was intended to reverse the results of a Second Republic election of deputies to the Constituent Assembly.
- 1848: The June Days uprising, an insurrection staged by Radical Republicans dissatisfied by the lack of social and class reform under the Second Republic.
- 1849: Insurrections in Paris and Lyon
- 1851: 1851 French coup d'état
- 1853–1854: Food riots
- 1868: Food riots
- 1869: Violent strikes in St Etienne and Aubin
- 1871: Paris Commune, a radical socialist and revolutionary government that took power in the aftermath of the Franco-Prussian War and ruled Paris from 18 March to 28 May 1871.
- 1880: Violent strikes
- 1891–1894: Violent strikes and anarchist terrorism
- 1893: Massacre of Italians at Aigues-Mortes

== 20th century ==
- 1900–1901: Violent strikes in Belfort and Marseille
- 1906–1907: Violent strikes
- 1907: Revolt of the Languedoc winegrowers
- 1908: Strikes in Nantes
- 1910–1911: Champagne Riots, resulted from a series of problems faced by grape growers in the Champagne area of France.
- 1919–1920: Violent strikes
- 1921: Violence that broke out at the premiere of the play The Gas Heart.
- 1926: Bloody Sunday, political clashes that occurred in Colmar, Alsace on August 22, 1926.
- 1934: 6 February 1934 crisis, an anti-parliamentarist street demonstration in Paris organized by far-right leagues that culminated in a riot
- 1936: General strike by one million workers
- 1947: 1947 strikes in France, a series of insurrectional strikes
- 1958: May 1958 crisis in France
- 1961: Algiers putsch of 1961
- 1968: May 1968 events in France, a volatile period of civil unrest that was punctuated by demonstrations and massive general strikes as well as the occupation of universities and factories across France.
- 1979: Youths of North African origin rioted in the Lyon suburb of Vaulx-en-Velin following an arrest of a local youth. Believed to be the first suburban riot in French history.
- 1981: Rodéo (riot), riots that consisted of stealing cars, driving them in tight circles, and ultimately burning them.
- 1984: Protests and rioting occurred during these French protests, with around 1 million participants. This resulted in the Bastille being stormed.
- 1990: Rioting in Vaulx-en-Velin after a young man of Spanish origin was killed in a motorbike crash allegedly caused by police.
- 1991: Violence broke out in Sartrouville after the fatal shooting of an Arab teenager by a supermarket security guard.
- 1991: Rioting occurred in Mantes-la-Jolie after a policewoman and an Algerian man were killed.
- 1992: Following the death of 18-year-old Mohamed Bahri in Vaulx-en-Velin at the hands of police, youths attacked the town's police station and burned cars.
- 1992: French truckers and farmers protested the implementation of a new driver's license point system by blocking roads.
- 1995: Rioting in several eastern suburbs of Lyon following the police killing of terrorist Khaled Kelkal, a key organizer of the 1995 France bombings
- 1997: Rioting occurred in Dammarie-lès-Lys after 16-year-old Abdelkadher Bouziane was shot and killed by police and his 19-year-old friend wounded.
- 1998: Two days of riots occurred in suburban Toulouse after 17-year-old Habib Muhammed was shot by police during a car theft.

== 21st century ==
- 2005: 2005 French riots, a series of riots that occurred in the suburbs of Paris and other French cities involving the burning of cars and public buildings at night.
- 2006: 2006 youth protests in France, riots resulting from opposition to a measure set to deregulate labour in France.
- 2007: 2007 anti-Sarkozy riots, a series of violent protests occurred in the days after the announcement of the results of the 2007 French presidential election
- 2007: 2007 Villiers-le-Bel riots, riots in the Val-d'Oise department that began following the deaths of two teenagers whose motorcycle collided with a police vehicle.
- 2007–09: 2007–09 university protests in France, protest movements resulting from several reform projects under Minister for Higher Education and Research Valérie Pécresse.
- 2009: 2009 French riots, a series of riots that occurred on Bastille Day (14 July) in the commune of Montreuil, an eastern suburb area of Paris.
- 2012: Notre Dame-des Landes Communities from nearby towns prevent an airport from being built on Notre Dame-des Landes forest and agricultural fields.
- 2013: 2013 Trappes riots, riots that broke out after police arrested a man who assaulted a police officer who tried to check the identity of his wife wearing a Muslim veil
- 2014: 2014 Sarcelles riots, a pro-Palestinian protest against the Israeli ground invasion of Gaza degenerated into an antisemitic riot in Sarcelles, France.
- 2016: 2016 French taxi driver strike, a strike by taxi drivers in several major cities against Uber, included many road blockades, fires, overturned vehicles, and the blockade of roads leading to the two major airports in Paris.
- 2016: Nuit debout, protests that grew out of opposition to proposed labor reforms.
- 2017: Protests started following accusations a police officer anally raped a young black man with a baton. Anti-police protests continued well into March 2017 when migrants were met with resistance from Paris residents.
- 2017- Arson attacks in Grenoble, generally against government and private buildings in Grenoble and its surroundings
- 2017: During May Day protests in Paris, a group of about 150 hooded demonstrators disrupted the march, throwing "Molotov cocktails, firebombs and other objects at the police near Place de la Bastille." These "violent protesters, who did not carry any union or election paraphernalia, appeared to be from the same fringe groups that have targeted anti-government protests in the past." Riot police responded with batons and tear gas. Six police officers were injured, two of them seriously, by petrol bombs.
- 2018: Ongoing Yellow vests movement (French: Gilets jaunes protests) over dissatisfaction with wealth disparity and ongoing increases to fuel taxes.
- 2022: 2022 Corsica unrest by Corsican nationalists in response to prison attack on Yvan Colonna
- 2022: 2022 Paris shooting, protests after the killing of three Kurds in Paris.
- 2023: 2023 French pension reform strikes due to the planned raise in retirement age from 62 to 64 years old.
- 2023: Nahel Merzouk protests and unrest after the killing of a teenager by police near Paris.
- 2024: 2024 French farmers' protests against low food prices, proposed reductions in state subsidies for farmers' diesel fuel, and a EU-Mercosur free trade agreement.
- 2024: 2024 New Caledonia unrest against a reform changing conditions that prevent up to one-fifth of the population from voting in provincial elections.
- 2024: In May 2024, police entered France's prestigious Sciences Po university and removed student activists who had occupied its buildings overnight in protest against Israel's conduct in its war against Hamas in Gaza. The young protesters shouting pro-Palestinian chants as they faced off with police. Students faced a “disproportionate” response from police.
- 2024: In July 2024, French Prime Minister Gabriel Attal announced his resignation after a left-wing coalition won a plurality of parliamentary seats in a major upset. Massive protests and celebrations erupted in Paris, leading to confrontations with police and instances of rioting.
- 2025: Bloquons tout
- 2026: 2026 French student protests by high school students against overcrowded classrooms, staffing shortages, decaying infrastructure such as toilets and buildings, and their school facilities being too small to comfortably accommodate everyone.

== See also ==
- History of France
- List of riots
