= Mini World =

Mini World may refer to:

- MiniWorld, the Mini car owner's club magazine, published by Kelsey Media
- Mini World (Japanese magazine), English-learner's magazine in Japan
- Mini World (album), a 2014 album by Indila
- Mini World Lyon, Park in France 2016.

== See also ==
- Mini World Rally Team
- Mini World Futsal Club Tournament
