= Mini World Futsal Club Tournament =

2013 Kuwait Mini World Futsal Club Tournament

Tournament details
- Host country: Kuwait
- Dates: July 10–26
- Teams: 16
- Venue: 1 (in 1 host city)

Final positions
- Champions: (Egypt) Misr LelMakasa (1st title)
- Runners-up: (Ukraine) MFC Kardinal Rivne
- Third place: (Spain) Santiago
- Fourth place: (Croatia) Alumnus Zagreb

Tournament statistics
- Matches played: 32
- Goals scored: 149 (4.66 per match)
- Top scorer: (Croatia) Hrvoje Penava (7 goals)
- Best player: (Spain) Alan Brandi

The Kuwait Mini World Futsal Club Tournament is the first Mini World Futsal Club tournament. It was held in Kuwait City, Kuwait between July 10 and July 26, 2013.

== Qualified teams ==
The following sixteen teams played the final tournament.

- (Croatia) Alumnus Zagreb (6th Croatian 1.HMNL 2012–13)
- Al-Muharraq (Champion Bahrain Futsal League 2012)
- (Saudi Arabia) Al Nassr (No Local Lige)
- Al-Sadd (Champion Qatar Futsal League 2012–2013)
- (Colombia) Atlético Huila (Semi-Finals Col Liga Argos Futsal 2012)
- Chonburi Blue Wave (Champion Thailand Futsal League 2012–13)
- (Romania) City'us Târgu Mureş (Champion Liga I 2012–13)
- (Iran) Dabiri Tabriz (4th Iranian Futsal Super League 2012–13)
- Erdre-Atlantique (Runner-up Championnat de France de Futsal 2012–13)
- (Ukraine) Kardinal Rivne (6th Extra-Liga 2012–13)
- (Kuwait) Kazma (Runner-up KUW Futsal League 12–13)
- (Egypt) Misr LelMakasa
- (Argentina) Pinocho (Champion Argentine División de Honor de Futsal 2012)
- (Kuwait) Qadsia (Champion KUW Futsal League 12–13)
- (Spain) Santiago (7th Primera División de Futsal 2012–13)
- Sport Colonial (10th Liga Nacional de Futsal FIFA de Paraguay 2012)

== Group stage ==
=== Group A ===
Team	Pld	W	D	L	GF	GA	GD	Pts
(Ukraine) MFC Kardinal Rivne	3	3	0	0	9	1	+8	9
(Egypt) Misr LelMakasa	3	3	0	1	6	3	+3	6
(Colombia) Atlético Huila	3	1	0	2	6	8	-2	3
(Saudi Arabia) Al Nassr	3	0	0	3	1	10	-9	0

July 10
15:50

MFC Kardinal Rivne (Ukraine)	2 - 0	(Saudi Arabia) Al Nassr
Oleksandr Bondar 13'; Cherniienko Andrii 28'	Report

Kazma Hall, Kuwait City

July 10
17:00

Atlético Huila (Colombia)	1 - 2	(Egypt) Misr LelMakasa
Jhon Alexander Rodríguez 22'	Report	Ahmed Hussein 35'; Ramadan Samasry 39'

Kazma Hall, Kuwait City

July 14
15:50

MFC Kardinal Rivne (Ukraine)	2 - 1	(Egypt) Misr LelMakasa
Oleksandr Bondar 33'; Serhii Piddubnyi 37'	Report	Mizo 18'

Kazma Hall, Kuwait City

July 14
17:00

Atlético Huila (Colombia)	5 - 1	(Saudi Arabia) Al Nassr
Jefferson Moreno Rueda 30'; Jesús Fernando Tejada Bonilla 34'; Miller Eduardo Cabrera 36', 38'; Jhon Alexander Rodríguez 37'	Report	Yahya Al Shehry 3'

Kazma Hall, Kuwait City

July 18
15:50

MFC Kardinal Rivne (Ukraine)	5 - 0	(Colombia) Atlético Huila
Cherniienko Andrii 9', 13', 39'; Sergii Trygubets 21'; Fareniuk Artem 38'	Report

Kazma Hall, Kuwait City

July 18
17:00

Misr LelMakasa (Egypt)	3 - 0	(Saudi Arabia) Al Nassr
	Report

Kazma Hall, Kuwait City

=== Group B ===
Team	Pld	W	D	L	GF	GA	GD	Pts
(Bahrain) Al-Muharraq	3	2	0	1	8	5	+3	6
(Argentina) Pinocho	3	2	0	1	8	7	+1	6
(Romania) City'us Târgu Mureş	3	2	0	1	11	11	0	6
(France) Erdre-Atlantique	3	0	0	3	8	12	-4	0

July 11
15:50

Pinocho (Argentina)	2 - 1	(Bahrain) Al-Muharraq
Lucas Maina 4'; Alan Calo 15'	Report	Ali Saleh Frih 14'

Kazma Hall, Kuwait City

July 11
17:00

City'us Târgu Mureş (Romania)	6 - 4	(France) Erdre-Atlantique
Dumitru Stoica 1'; Cosmin Gherman 4', 21'; Robert Lupu 6', 15', 38'	Report	Javier Moreno 12', 30', 37'; Celso Sanz Sendon 18'

Kazma Hall, Kuwait City

July 15
15:50

Pinocho (Argentina)	3 - 2	(France) Erdre-Atlantique
Lucas Maina 31'; Mauro Quetgla 36'; Alan Calo 38'	Report	Celso Sanz Sendon 4'; Angel Ayuso Pico 16'

Kazma Hall, Kuwait City

July 15
17:00

City'us Târgu Mureş (Romania)	1 - 4	(Bahrain) Al-Muharraq
Bogdan Covaci 30'	Report	Jassam Saleh 1'; Ali Saleh Frih 16'; Ahmed Mohamed 34'; Mahmooud Abdulrahman 39'

Kazma Hall, Kuwait City

July 19
15:50

Pinocho (Argentina)	3 - 4	(Romania) City'us Târgu Mureş
Lucas Maina 16'; Gabriel Fafasuli 28'; Alan Calo 37'	Report	Cristian Matei 7', 7', 35'; Robert Lupu 13'

Kazma Hall, Kuwait City

July 19
17:00

Erdre-Atlantique (France)	2 - 3	(Bahrain) Al-Muharraq
Roberto Garcia 3'; Karim Bentaifour 36'	Report	Ighor Fernando Galvao 9', 16'; Mahmooud Abdulrahman 39'

Kazma Hall, Kuwait City

=== Group C ===
Team	Pld	W	D	L	GF	GA	GD	Pts
(Qatar) Al-Sadd	3	1	2	0	10	8	+2	5
(Kuwait) Qadsia	3	1	1	1	14	7	+7	4
(Paraguay) Sport Colonial	3	1	1	1	6	7	-1	4
(Iran) Dabiri Tabriz	3	0	2	1	9	17	-8	2

July 12
15:50

Dabiri Tabriz (Iran)	4 - 4	(Qatar) Al-Sadd
Vahid Shamsaei 2', 28', 38'; Nasrollah Momen 29'	Report	Mohamed Ismail Ahmed Ismail 21'; Samer Sami Waheed 28', 33'; Rodriguinho 28'

Kazma Hall, Kuwait City

July 12
17:00

Sport Colonial (Paraguay)	2 - 1	(Kuwait) Qadsia
Enmanuel Ayala 22', 39'	Report	Marcinho 23'

Kazma Hall, Kuwait City

July 16
15:50

Dabiri Tabriz (Iran)	3 - 11	(Kuwait) Qadsia
Rashid Gholipour 24'; Vahid Shamsaei 28'; Mehran Rezapour 37'	Report	Tiago Ignatiuk 1', 22'; Marcinho 8'; Rafael Soua 14', 16', 26'; Gabriel Martins 28'; Rafael Novaes 29', 31', 38', 39'

Kazma Hall, Kuwait City

July 16
17:00

Sport Colonial (Paraguay)	2 - 4	(Qatar) Al-Sadd
Magno Daniel Silva 33', 34'	Report	Mohamed Ismail Ahmed Ismail 2'; Rodriguinho 32'; Amro Mohaseen 38'; Flavio Barreto Arantes 39'

Kazma Hall, Kuwait City

July 20
15:50

Dabiri Tabriz (Iran)	2 - 2	(Paraguay) Sport Colonial
Farhad Fakhim 29'; Javad Asghari Moghaddam 36'	Report	Magno Daniel Silva 6'; Enmanuel Ayala 28'

Kazma Hall, Kuwait City

July 20
17:00

Qadsia (Kuwait)	2 - 2	(Qatar) Al-Sadd
Marcinho 2'; Rafael Soua 31'	Report	Rodriguinho 6'; Flavio Barreto Arantes 23'

Kazma Hall, Kuwait City

=== Group D ===
Team	Pld	W	D	L	GF	GA	GD	Pts
(Spain) Santiago	3	3	0	0	6	1	+5	9
(Croatia) Alumnus Zagreb	3	1	1	1	5	5	0	4
(Thailand) Chonburi Blue Wave	3	1	1	1	6	7	-1	4
(Kuwait) Kazma	3	0	0	3	3	7	-4	0

July 13
15:50

Santiago (Spain)	1 - 0	(Kuwait) Kazma
Quintela 30'	Report

Kazma Hall, Kuwait City

July 13
17:00

Alumnus Zagreb (Croatia)	2 - 2	(Thailand) Chonburi Blue Wave
Hrvoje Penava 2', 38'	Report	Kritsada Wongkaeo 22'; Xapa 39'

Kazma Hall, Kuwait City

July 17
15:50

Santiago (Spain)	3 - 1	(Thailand) Chonburi Blue Wave
Hamza 7'; Alan 21', 22'	Report	Nattawut Madyalan 29'

Kazma Hall, Kuwait City

July 17
17:00

Alumnus Zagreb (Croatia)	3 - 1	(Kuwait) Kazma
Hrvoje Penava 24', 32'; Kristijan Postruzin 39'	Report	Daniel Ibañes Caetano 36'

Kazma Hall, Kuwait City

July 21
15:50

Santiago (Spain)	2 - 0	(Croatia) Alumnus Zagreb
Alan 1'; David 14'	Report

Kazma Hall, Kuwait City

July 21
17:00

Chonburi Blue Wave (Thailand)	3 - 2	(Kuwait) Kazma
Sarawut Jaipetch 16'; Suphawut Thueanklang 27'; Nattawut Madyalan 33'	Report	João Vieira 29'; Daniel Ibañes Caetano (Kazma) 30'

Kazma Hall, Kuwait City

== Knockout stage ==
Quarter-finals
July 22 - Kazma Hall, Kuwait City
(Ukraine) MFC Kardinal Rivne	3
(Kuwait) Qadsia	0
July 22 - Kazma Hall, Kuwait City
(Bahrain) Al-Muharraq	1
(Croatia) Alumnus Zagreb	5
July 23 - Kazma Hall, Kuwait City
(Qatar) Al-Sadd	1 (1)
(Egypt) Misr LelMakasa	1 (3)
July 23 - Kazma Hall, Kuwait City
(Spain) Santiago	4
(Argentina) Pinocho	3

Semi-finals
July 24 - Kazma Hall, Kuwait City
(Ukraine) MFC Kardinal Rivne	2
(Croatia) Alumnus Zagreb	1
July 24 - Kazma Hall, Kuwait City
(Egypt) Misr LelMakasa	3
(Spain) Santiago	2

Final
July 26 - Kazma Hall, Kuwait City
(Ukraine) MFC Kardinal Rivne	1
(Egypt) Misr LelMakasa	3
Third place
July 25 - Kazma Hall, Kuwait City
(Croatia) Alumnus Zagreb	1
(Spain) Santiago	2

=== Quarter-finals ===
July 22
15:50

MFC Kardinal Rivne (Ukraine)	3 - 0	(Kuwait) Qadsia
Oleksandr Bondar 27'; Serhii Piddubnyi 33'; Cherniienko Andrii 39'	Report

Kazma Hall, Kuwait City

July 22
17:00

Al-Muharraq (Bahrain)	1 - 5	(Croatia) Alumnus Zagreb
Ahmed Mohamed 39'	Report	Matija Capar 7', 37'; Hrvoje Penava 17', 21', 38'

Kazma Hall, Kuwait City

July 23
15:50

Al-Sadd (Qatar)	1 - 1 (pen.) 1 – 3	(Egypt) Misr LelMakasa
Samer Sami Waheed 4'	Report	Ayman Ibrahem Abdulkader 24'

Kazma Hall, Kuwait City

July 23
17:00

Santiago (Spain)	4 - 3	(Argentina) Pinocho
David 6'; David Pazos 24', 29'; Lucho 36'	Report	Lucas Maina 9'; Lucas Chianelli 14'; German Abel Corazza 38'

Kazma Hall, Kuwait City

=== Semi-finals ===
July 24
15:50

MFC Kardinal Rivne (Ukraine)	2 - 1	(Croatia) Alumnus Zagreb
Oleksandr Bondar 30'; Serhii Piddubnyi 40'	Report	Josip Jurić 8'

Kazma Hall, Kuwait City

July 24
17:00

Misr LelMakasa (Egypt)	3 - 2	(Spain) Santiago
Ahmad Ysry Abdullatef 9', 14'; Ayman Ibrahem Abdulkader 27'	Report	Alan 7'; Quintela 23'

Kazma Hall, Kuwait City

=== Third place play-off ===
July 25
16:30

Alumnus Zagreb (Croatia)	1 - 2	(Spain) Santiago
Josip Jurić 31'	Report	David 17'; Alan 19'

Kazma Hall, Kuwait City

=== Final ===
July 26
16:00

MFC Kardinal Rivne (Ukraine)	1 - 3 (a.e.t.)	(Egypt) Misr LelMakasa
Oleksandr Bondar 20'	Report	Ayman Ibrahem Abdulkader 16'; Mohammad Ibrahem Idrees 47'; Ramadan Samasry 50'

Kazma Hall, Kuwait City

== Awards ==
Mini World Futsal Club Tournament
2013

Misr LelMakasa
First Title

- Best Player
  - (Spain) Alan Brandi
- Top Scorer
  - (Croatia) Hrvoje Penava (7 goals)
- Best Goalkeeper
  - (Ukraine) Dieniuzhkin Vitalii
- Best Young Player
  - (Croatia) Kristijan Postruzin
- Fair-Play Award
  - (Croatia) Alumnus Zagreb

== Goalscorers ==
7 goals

- (Croatia) Hrvoje Penava (Alumnus Zagreb)

5 goals

- (Ukraine) Cherniienko Andrii (MFC Kardinal Rivne)
- (Spain) Alan (Santiago)
- (Ukraine) Oleksandr Bondar (MFC Kardinal Rivne)

4 goals

- (Brazil) Rafael Novaes (Qadsia)
- (Brazil) Rafael Soua (Qadsia)
- (Iran) Vahid Shamsaei (Dabiri Tabriz)
- (Argentina) Lucas Maina (Pinocho)
- (Romania) Robert Lupu (City'us Târgu Mureş)

3 goals

- (Argentina) Alan Calo (Pinocho)
- (Paraguay) Enmanuel Ayala (Sport Colonial)
- (Romania) Cristian Matei (City'us Târgu Mureş)
- (Ukraine) Serhii Piddubnyi (MFC Kardinal Rivne)
- (Spain) Javier Moreno (Erdre-Atlantique)
- (Spain) David (Santiago)
- (Colombia) Magno Daniel Silva (Sport Colonial)
- (Egypt) Ayman Ibrahem Abdulkader (Misr LelMakasa)
- (Brazil) Marcinho (Qadsia)
- (Qatar) Rodriguinho (Al Sadd)
- (Qatar) Samer Sami Waheed (Al Sadd)

2 goals

- (Colombia) Miller Eduardo Cabrera (Atlético Huila)
- (Colombia) Jhon Alexander Rodríguez (Atlético Huila)
- (Bahrain) Ali Saleh Frih (Al-Muharraq)
- (Bahrain) Mahmooud Abdulrahman (Al-Muharraq)
- (Bahrain) Ahmed Mohamed (Al-Muharraq)
- (Egypt) Ahmad Ysry Abdullatef (Misr LelMakasa)
- (Egypt) Ramadan Samasry (Misr LelMakasa)
- (Thailand) Nattawut Madyalan (Chonburi Blue Wave)
- (Spain) Celso Sanz Sendon (Erdre-Atlantique)
- (Romania) Cosmin Gherman (City'us Târgu Mureş)
- (United Arab Emirates) Mohamed Ismail Ahmed Ismail (Al Sadd)
- (Brazil) Ighor Fernando Galvao (Al-Muharraq)
- (Croatia) Josip Jurić (Alumnus Zagreb)
- (Spain) David Pazos (Santiago)
- (Spain) Quintela (Santiago)
- (Spain) Daniel Ibañes Caetano (Kazma)
- (Qatar) Flavio Barreto Arantes (Al Sadd)
- (Brazil) Tiago Ignatiuk (Qadsia)
- (Croatia) Matija Capar (Alumnus Zagreb)

1 goals

- (Argentina) Lucas Chianelli (Pinocho)
- (Argentina) German Abel Corazza (Pinocho)
- (Argentina) Mauro Quetgla (Pinocho)
- (Argentina) Gabriel Fafasuli (Pinocho)
- (Colombia) Jefferson Moreno Rueda (Atlético Huila)
- (Colombia) Jesús Fernando Tejada Bonilla (Atlético Huila)
- (Spain) Angel Ayuso Pico (Erdre-Atlantique)
- (Spain) Roberto Garcia (Erdre-Atlantique)
- (Spain) Hamza (Santiago)
- (Spain) Lucho (Santiago)
- (Bahrain) Jassam Saleh (Al-Muharraq)
- (Ukraine) Sergii Trygubets (MFC Kardinal Rivne)
- (Ukraine) Fareniuk Artem (MFC Kardinal Rivne)
- (Egypt) Mizo (Misr LelMakasa)
- (Egypt) Ahmed Hussein (Misr LelMakasa)
- (Egypt) Mohammad Ibrahem Idrees (Misr LelMakasa)
- (Brazil) Xapa (Chonburi Blue Wave)
- (Brazil) Gabriel Martins (Qadsia)
- (Saudi Arabia) Yahya Al Shehry (Al Nassr)
- (Croatia) Kristijan Postruzin (Alumnus Zagreb)
- (France) Karim Bentaifour (Erdre-Atlantique)
- (Portugal) João Vieira (Kazma)
- (Iran) Nasrollah Momen (Dabiri Tabriz)
- (Iran) Rashid Gholipour (Dabiri Tabriz)
- (Iran) Mehran Rezapour (Dabiri Tabriz)
- (Iran) Farhad Fakhim (Dabiri Tabriz)
- (Iran) Javad Asghari Moghaddam (Dabiri Tabriz)
- (Qatar) Amro Mohaseen (Al Sadd)
- (Thailand) Sarawut Jaipetch (Chonburi Blue Wave)
- (Thailand) Suphawut Thueanklang (Chonburi Blue Wave)
- (Thailand) Kritsada Wongkaeo (Chonburi Blue Wave)
- (Romania) Dumitru Stoica (City'us Târgu Mureş)
- (Romania) Bogdan Covaci (City'us Târgu Mureş)
