= 2023 French unrest =

2023 French unrest may refer to:

- Nahel Merzouk riots after the 27 June 2023 police killing near Paris
- 2023 French pension reform strikes

== See also ==
- List of incidents of civil unrest in France
