= Vaulx-en-Velin fire =

Fire in Vaulx-en-Velin, France

- Date: 16 December 2022
- Time: c. 03:00 (UTC+01:00)
- Location: Vaulx-en-Velin, Auvergne-Rhône-Alpes, France; 45°46′56″N 4°54′49″E
- Deaths: 10
- Injuries: 14

On 16 December 2022, a fire ravaged a residential building at 12 chemin des Barques in Vaulx-en-Velin, Auvergne-Rhône-Alpes, France. It resulted in killing 10 people, including five children, and injured 14.

== Fire ==
The fire broke out at around 3 a.m. on the first floor of a 7-story apartment building located at 12 chemin des Barques in the district of Mas-du-Taureau in Vaulx-en-Velin. The alert was given at 3:12 a.m. and the first members of the departmental-metropolitan fire and rescue service (SDMIS) arrive on the scene at three minutes later. A total of 170 firefighters and 65 fire engines were mobilized to put out the flames. Smoke reportedly caused many to become disoriented and unable to locate evacuation routes, forcing many to evacuate by ladders and exterior windows. Witnesses recalled residents smashing windows to try and climb out of the building and one mother who threw her child out of a window to be caught by a person on the ground. At 6:30 a.m. the prefecture of Rhône announced that the fire was extinguished.

== Fatalities ==
Ten people, including five children, were killed by the blast. Fourteen people, including two firemen, were also injured. In a press conference, Darmanin said that the ages of the children who died ranged from 3 to 15 years and that all those who died or were seriously injured in the fire were in the building at the time it broke out.

== Investigation ==
Although the causes of the fire remain initially unknown, the Minister of the Interior Gérald Darmanin confirmed, at 7:38 a.m., that there were several hypotheses relating to them. If it does not specify which ones, Le Progrès suggested that the fire was caused by either "a boiler problem or a garbage fire".

== Aftermath ==
The provisional human toll being particularly heavy, the prefect of Rhône Pascal Mailhos announced the opening of a departmental operational center (COD) and the triggering of the number of victims plan. Counseling centers were set up at two local schools that were believed to have the majority of victims attending.

== Response ==
French Interior Minister Gerald Darmanin, announced that he would visit the site with France's housing minister while offering his condolences to the family and friends of the victims. Mailhos also went to the site with the mayor of Vaulx-en-Velin and the public prosecutor of Lyon, joined later by the Minister Delegate for the City and Housing Olivier Klein and Darmanin.

French Prime Minister Elisabeth Borne and football team Olympique Lyonnais also issued statements offering their thoughts to those affected.

== See also ==
- Saint-Laurent-de-la-Salanque explosion
