= Hôtel de Ville, Vaulx-en-Velin =

Town hall in Vaulx-en-Velin, France

Hôtel de Ville
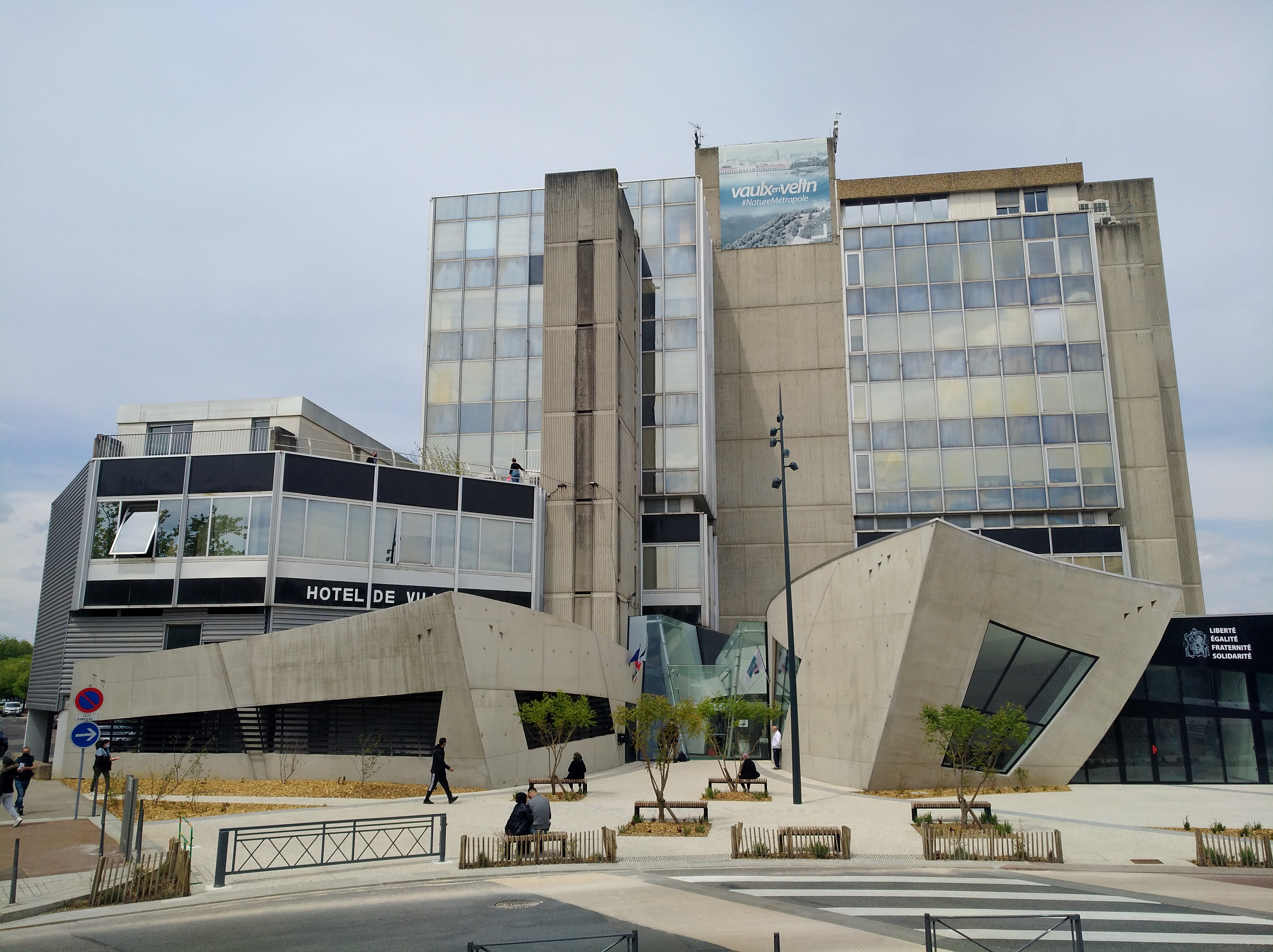
- The main frontage of the Hôtel de Ville in May 2021
- Interactive map of the Hôtel de Ville area

General information
- Type: City hall
- Architectural style: Brutalist style
- Location: Vaulx-en-Velin, France
- Coordinates: 45.7785°N 4.9201°E
- Completed: 1977

The Hôtel de Ville (French pronunciation: [otɛl də vil], City Hall) is a municipal building in Vaulx-en-Velin, Metropolis of Lyon, eastern France, standing on Place de la Nation.

== History ==
Following the French Revolution, the town council initially met in the house of the mayor at the time. However, this changed in 1839, when the council decided to acquire a dedicated municipal building. The building they selected was the Château de Vaulx which was owned by the Chaumais family. The château was a fortified building, originally featuring four towers, which dated from the 13th century. It was rebuilt in the Renaissance style during the ownership of Etienne de Mucio, maître d'hôtel to Henry III, in 1580. The building became the home of Antoine-Etienne, Marquis de Rachais, who served as a lieutenant in the French Guards Regiment in the mid-18th century. It was then used as a school before being acquired by the town council in 1840. The council subsequently instigated various modifications to give the main frontage a more neoclassical look.

The château continued to serve as the offices and meeting place of the town council for much of the 20th century. However, following the creation of a Zone à Urbaniser en Priorité (urban development zone) in the 1960s, the council led by the mayor, Robert Many, decided to commission a modern town hall. The site they selected was in the heart of that zone. The new building was designed in the brutalist style, built in concrete and glass and was officially opened in 1977.

The design involved an asymmetrical main frontage facing onto Rue Maurice Audin. It consisted of a two-storey hexagonal structure to the left and a main office block of seven storeys to the right.

A major programme of refurbishment works was undertaken by Groupe Vallorge to a design by architects, Raphaël Pistilli, between 2020 and 2022. The works involved the creation of a new glass entrance with single storey extensions on either side of the new entrance. The single-storey extensions, which accommodated a new Salle du Conseil (council chamber) and a new Salle des Mariages (wedding room), were enclosed within curved concrete walls. The concrete walls were intended to emphasise the route to the main entrance.
