= Marie-Frédérique Ayissi =

French basketball player

Marie-Frédérique Ayissi (born January 11, 1982, in Vaulx-en-Velin) is a French basketball player who plays for club Union Hainaut of the Ligue Féminine de Basketball.

== Biography ==
After two seasons with Armentières—the second of which was in LF2—she returned to the LFB with Saint-Amand.

After being relegated to Ligue 2, Perpignan was once again crowned Ligue 2 champion with a victory over COB Calais (77–56) in the final.

After Perpignan's administrative relegation left her without a club, she signed in early November 2014 with La Tronche-Meylan, where her former coach, François Gomez, had just been hired.
