= Robert Lupu =

Romanian futsal player

Lupu
Personal information
- Full name: Robert Lupu
- Date of birth: 28 October 1982 (age 44)
- Place of birth: Romania
- Position: Winger

Team information
- Current team: CS Informatica Timişoara

Senior career*
Years	Team	Apps	(Gls)
2002–2004	Bodu Bucuresti		
2004–2009	CIP Deva		
2009–2010	Ribera Navarra		
2010– 2013	City'us		
2013–2015	Autobergamo Deva		
2015– 2016	CS Informatica Timişoara		

International career
- Romania
- * Club domestic league appearances and goals

Robert Lupu (born 28 October 1982), is a Romanian futsal player who plays for CS Informatica Timişoara and the Romanian national futsal team.
