= Mini World Lyon =

Miniature park in France

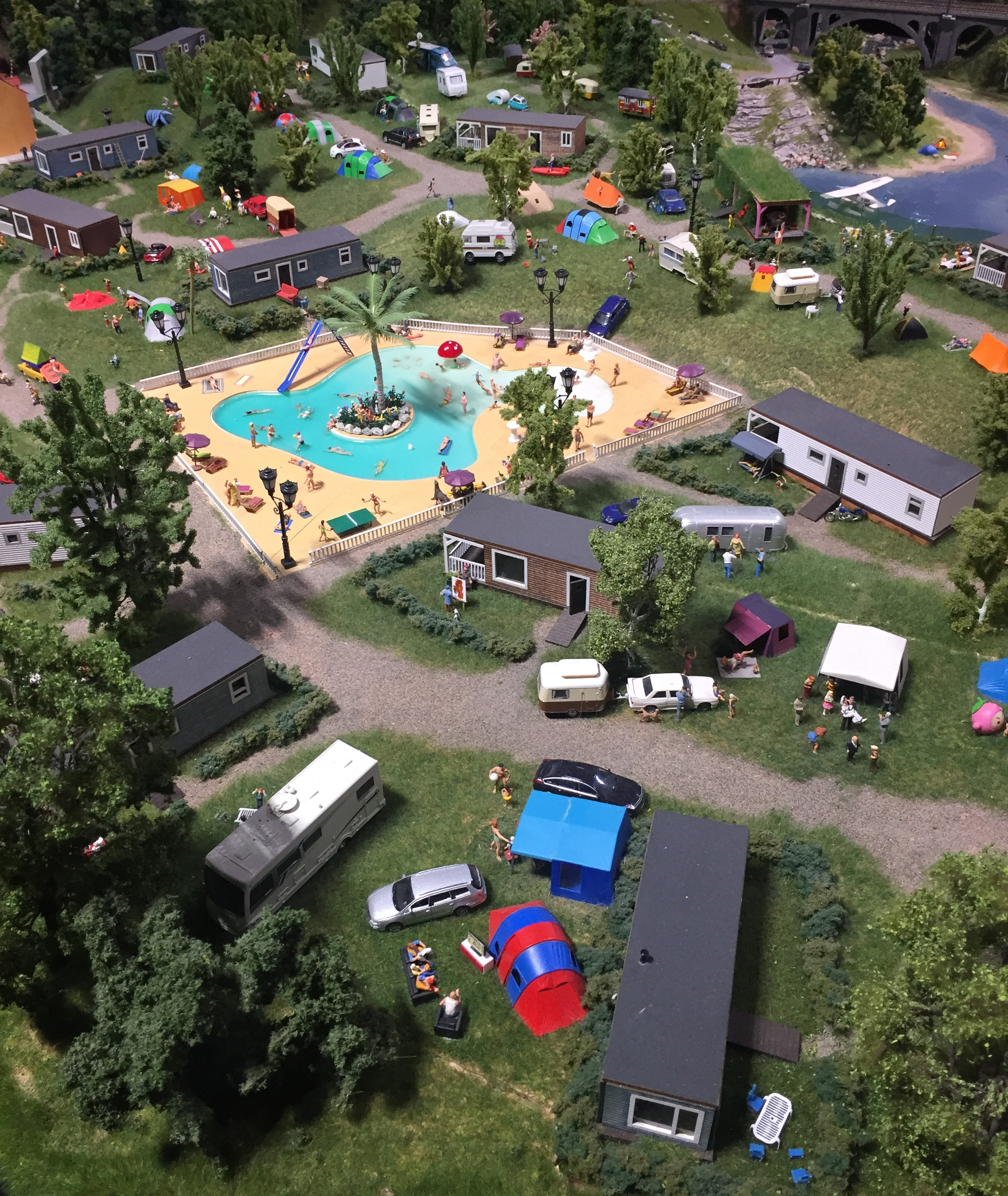
- Mini World Lyon in Vaulx-en-Velin
- Interactive map of Mini World Lyon
- Location: Vaulx-en-Velin, Metropolis of Lyon, France
- Coordinates: 45.763929°N 4.923937°E
- Status: Operating
- Opened: June 30, 2016
- Owner: Richard Richarté, Chief Executive Officer
- Website: Mini World Lyon

Mini World Lyon is an animated miniature park of 4,500 square metres (1.1 acres) in the leisure center of Carré de Soie in Vaulx-en-Velin, a commune in the Metropolis of Lyon, in France. This park has been open since June 30, 2016.

It is to date the largest amusement park of its kind in France. The project was inspired by the success of Miniatur Wunderland in Hamburg, Germany.

== History ==
According to Mini World Lyon park director Richard Richarté, the inspiration to build the miniature park came after having built a model house at home with his daughter. After having built that single model he says he went online looking for miniature models and came across Miniatur Wunderland. He says that he visited this park a week later and inspired by it conceptualised the idea and construction of his park, it took him four years from idea to opening of the park to the public.

== Description ==
Mini World Lyon offers animated scenes of life, autonomously moving vehicles, landscapes divided into three worlds city, countryside and mountain. The park has 30,000 miniature inhabitants and 4,000 animals, with scenes changing from day to night every 20 minutes. The park is entirely built on the HO 1:87 scale, which is the most widely used scale in the world for miniature train systems. Many characters are hidden in the worlds like superheroes, cartoons, movies, TV shows and celebrities. An extension on the theme of the city of Lyon, called Mini Lyon, opened at the end of 2018. Some nights feature the Festival of Lights.

The park hosts temporary exhibitions like Playmobil, Lego and a 3D cinema.
