= Liga I (futsal) =

- Organising body: Romanian Football Federation
- Founded: 2002; 24 years ago
- Country: Romania
- Confederation: UEFA
- Number of clubs: 8
- Level on pyramid: 1
- Relegation to: Liga II (futsal)
- Domestic cup: Romanian Futsal Cup
- International cup: UEFA Futsal Champions League
- Current champions: United Galați (4) (2025/2026)
- Most championships: City'US Târgu Mureș (6)
- Broadcaster(s): Digi Sport, Prima Sport, FRF TV (via YouTube)
- Website: http://frfotbal.ro/index.php?section=1

Liga I is futsal league in Romania, organized by the Romanian Football Federation.

== Teams for the 2024–2025 season ==
- ACS West Deva
- Futsal Klub Odorheiu Secuiesc
- United Galați
- CFR 1933 Timișoara
- Luceafarul Buzau
- Mausoleul Mărășești
- Sepsi SIC
- CSM Târgu Mureș

== Champions ==
Season	Winner
2002/2003	ACS Odorheiu Secuiesc
2003/2004	FC Bodu Bucuresti
2004/2005	ACS Odorheiu Secuiesc
2005/2006	Cip Deva
2006/2007	Cip Deva
2007/2008	ACS Odorheiu Secuiesc
2008/2009	Cip Deva
2009/2010	City'us Târgu Mureş
2010/2011	City'us Târgu Mureş
2011/2012	City'us Târgu Mureş
2012/2013	City'us Târgu Mureş
2013/2014	Autobergamo Deva
2014/2015	City'us Târgu Mureş
2015/2016	City'us Târgu Mureş
2016/2017	Autobergamo Deva
2017/2018	Informatica Timișoara
2018/2019	Imperial WET Miercurea-Ciuc
2019/2020	Cancelled due COVID-19 pandemic
2020/2021	Imperial WET Miercurea-Ciuc
2021/2022	Autobergamo Deva
2022/2023	United Galați
2023/2024	United Galați
2024/2025	United Galați
2025/2026	United Galați
