= Vaulx-en-Velin =

- Commune
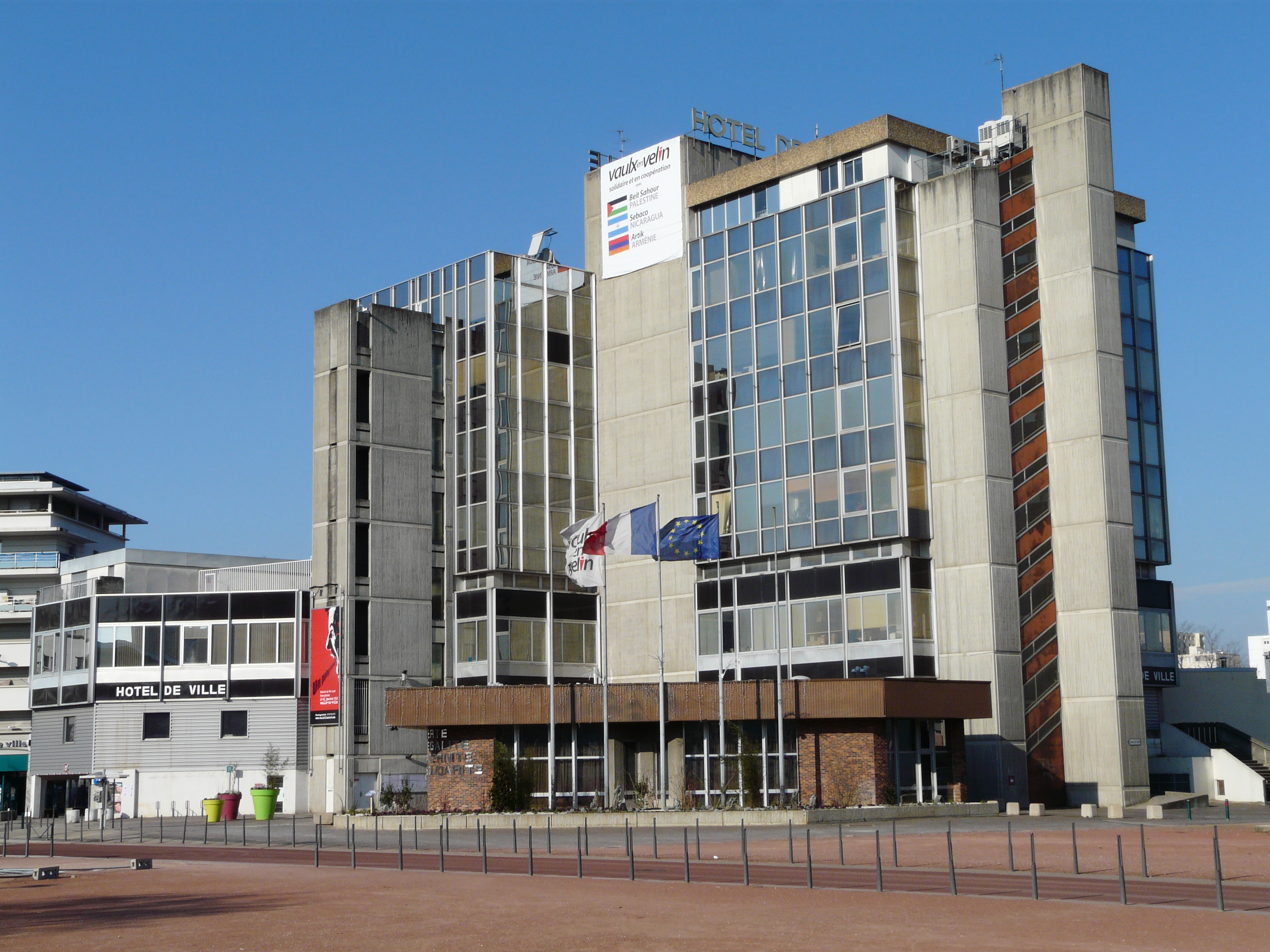
- The Hôtel de Ville

- Coat of arms
- Location of Vaulx-en-Velin
- Location within France Location within Auvergne-Rhône-Alpes
- Coordinates: 45°46′36″N 4°55′07″E
- Country: France
- Region: Auvergne-Rhône-Alpes
- Metropolis: Lyon Metropolis
- Arrondissement: Lyon

Government
  - Mayor (2026–32): Abdelkader Lahmar (LFI)
- Area^{1}: 20.95 km^{2} (8.09 sq mi)
- Elevation: 192 m (630 ft)
- Highest elevation: 193 m (633 ft)
- Lowest elevation: 165 m (541 ft)
- Population (2023): 53,069
  - Density: 2,533/km^{2} (6,561/sq mi)
- Demonym(s): Vaudais, Vaudaise
- Time zone: UTC+01:00 (CET)
  - Summer (DST): UTC+02:00 (CEST)
- INSEE/Postal code: 69256 /69120
- ^{1} French Land Register data, which excludes lakes, ponds, glaciers > 1 km^{2} (0.386 sq mi or 247 acres) and river estuaries.

Vaulx-en-Velin (French pronunciation: [vo ɑ̃ v(ə)lɛ̃]) is a commune in the Metropolis of Lyon, Auvergne-Rhône-Alpes, eastern France. It is the third-largest suburb of the city of Lyon, and is located to its northeast, on the river Rhône.

== History ==
The rivers, including the Rhône, regularly overflowed their banks, leaving behind a swampy area. The first verifiable mention of the village of Vaulx-en-Velin comes from the year 1225. The place was not spared from wars either. In 1628 the plague raged in the village. Many people suffered from malaria - the field name "En Palud" (French for "in the swamp") testifies to this. A dike was built between 1863 and 1879 to dry out around 9,000 hectares of land. The Saint Jean Villeurbanne dam, built between 1879 and 1882, protects Vaulx-en-Velin from flooding.

At the beginning of the 20th century, Vaulx-en-Velin, which had traditionally focused on agricultural production (wheat, vegetables, and fodder, later sugar beets), underwent a transformation: Industrialization began in 1925 with the founding of SASE (Soie Artificielle du Sud-Est, artificial silk of the southeast), which specialized in converting cellulose into viscose (artificial silk). Up to 3,000 people worked in the textile industry in Vaulx-en-Velin. When the crisis in the textile industry became apparent in 1980 with the closure of the former SASE factory, the town was hit hard by unemployment. The Hôtel de Ville was completed in 1977.

In 1971, the first riots and incidents occurred in a settlement that had been built specifically for Harkis. In September 1979 the first Banlieue suburban youth riots in France broke out in the Cité Olivier-de-Serres in Vaulx-en-Velin.

One third of the population lives below the poverty line.

On 16 December 2022, a large fire broke out in a seven-storey apartment building, killing ten people, including five children, and injuring 14.

== Population ==
Historical population

Year	Pop.	±% p.a.
1793	762	—
1800	961	+3.37%
1806	986	+0.43%
1821	1,045	+0.39%
1831	1,125	+0.74%
1836	1,170	+0.79%
1841	1,182	+0.20%
1846	1,233	+0.85%
1851	1,287	+0.86%
1856	1,263	−0.38%
1861	1,340	+1.19%
1866	1,260	−1.22%
1872	1,238	−0.29%
1876	1,245	+0.14%
1881	1,258	+0.21%
1886	1,251	−0.11%
1891	1,270	+0.30%
1896	1,314	+0.68%
1901	1,251	−0.98%

Year	Pop.	±% p.a.
1906	1,235	−0.26%
1911	1,315	+1.26%
1921	1,588	+1.90%
1926	3,745	+18.72%
1931	8,124	+16.75%
1936	7,386	−1.89%
1946	7,821	+0.57%
1954	9,630	+2.64%
1962	12,118	+2.91%
1968	20,726	+9.36%
1975	37,866	+8.99%
1982	44,160	+2.22%
1990	44,174	+0.00%
1999	39,154	−1.33%
2007	40,626	+0.46%
2012	43,394	+1.33%
2017	49,658	+2.73%
2023	53,069	+1.11%

Source: EHESS and INSEE (1968-2023)

== Transport ==
- Metro line A
- Tram T3
- Several buses lines from Transports en commun lyonnais
- Rhônexpress

== Personalities ==
- Nathalie Arthaud (born 1970), candidate for the 2012 presidential election, was one of the municipal councillors
- Marie-Frédérique Ayissi (born 1982), basketball player
- Junior Sambia (born 1996), footballer
- Khal Torabully (born 1956), writer and director
- Corinne Vigreux (born 1964), business executive and co-founder of TomTom

== See also ==
- Communes of the Metropolis of Lyon
- Mini World Lyon
