= Bloquons tout =

2025 protest movement in France

- Part of Gen Z protests
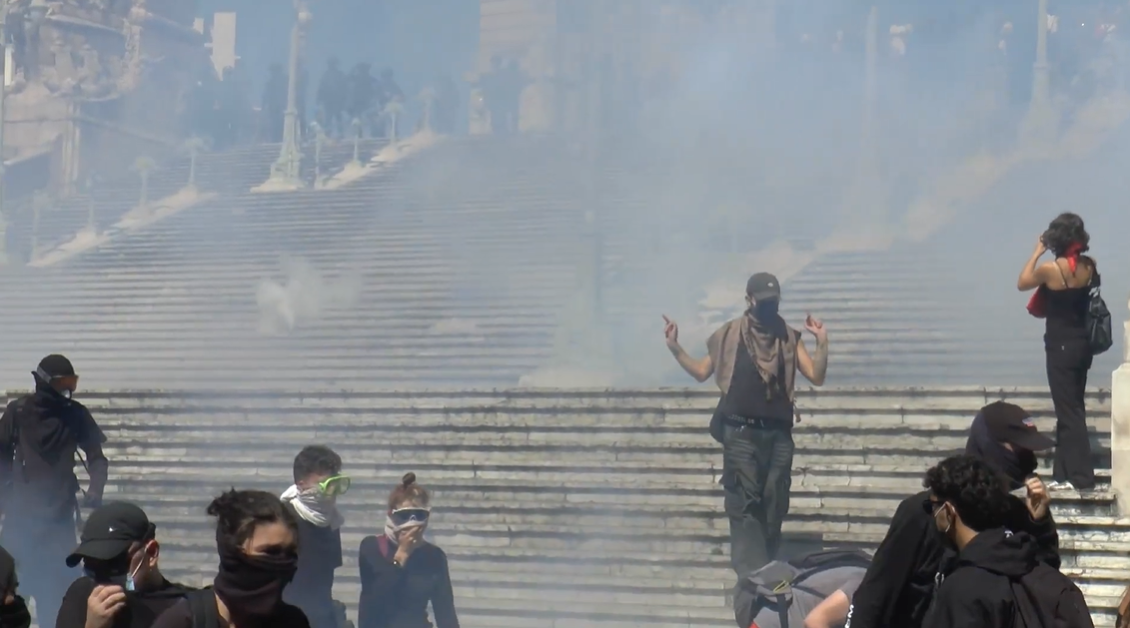
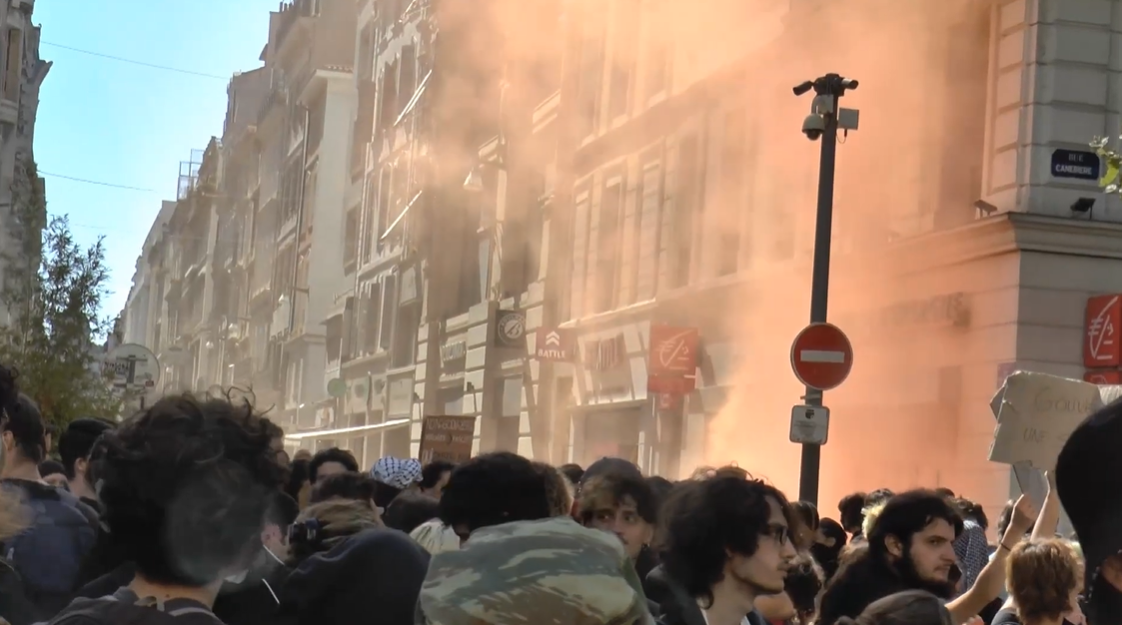
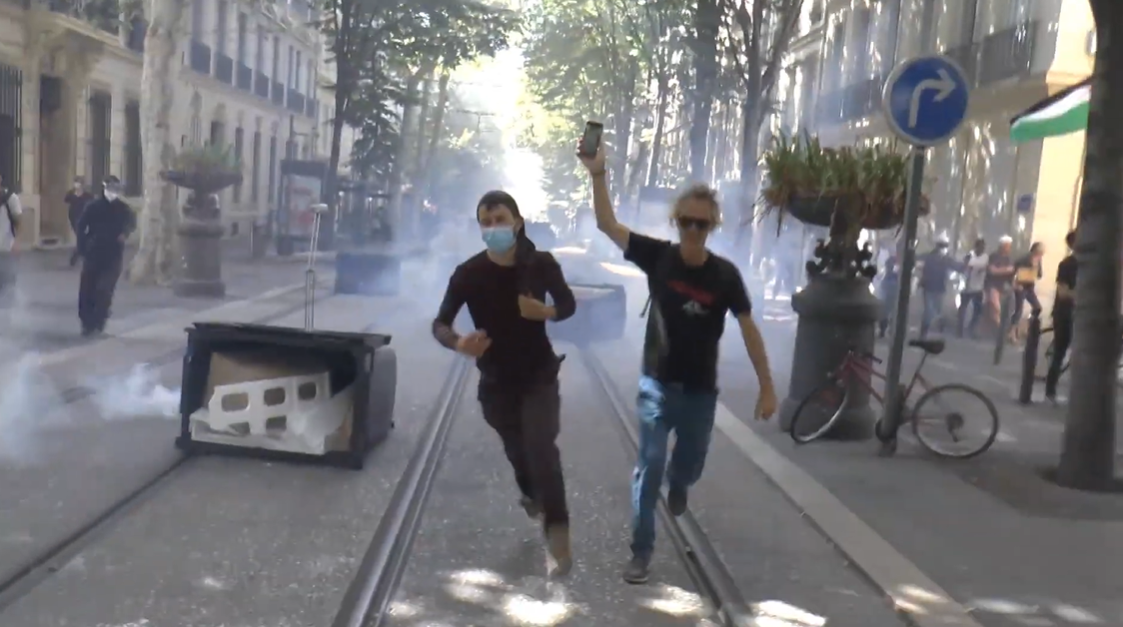
- Photos of the protests on 10 September 2025 taken by Hervé Germain, published on his YouTube channel under CC BY
- Date: September 2025 – October 2025
- Location: France
- Caused by: Opposition to the Bayrou government's proposed 2026 national budget and austerity measures.
- Result: Concluded; Bayrou government dissolved; 2023 French pension reform law put onto hold

Parties
Grassroots movement La France Insoumise supporters	Bayrou government

Bloquons tout (French pronunciation: [blɔkɔ̃ tu]; English: "Block everything" or Let's block everything) was a protest movement in France that emerged on social media in May 2025. The movement called for a general strike and nationwide "shutdown" on 10 September 2025, to oppose the austerity measures proposed by the government of Prime Minister François Bayrou. Ring roads in Bordeaux, and other Northern French cities like Rennes, Nantes, Caen and in Paris were blocked. The second action was in combination with a strike announced by main French trade unions on 18 September 2025. On October 2, 2025, the third wave of protests took place.

== Causes ==
The direct cause was the 2026 budget plan of François Bayrou, which contained various proposed measures to reduce public spending. Moreover, the perceived democratic deficits of the Macron presidency were an important factor, as François Bayrou was the seventh prime minister of Macron's alliance, despite increased discontent and the results of the 2024 legislative elections.

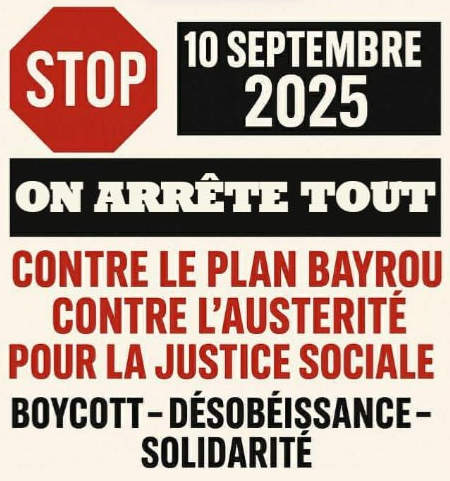
A flyer for the event, reading: "Stop - September 10, 2025 - We Stop Everything - Against the Bayrou Plan, Against Austerity, For Social Justice - Boycott, Disobedience, Solidarity"

== Background ==
The movement arose in May 2025 online among right-wing groups. The first mentions of the movement appeared on the TikTok account of a 43-year-old man from Hazebrouck in May 2025, he is a founder of Les Essentiels movement. Popularity of Bloquons tout soon grew, with both left and right-wing activists endorsing it, they included ecologists and neo-nazis. Before its actions, the Bloquons tout movement had drawn support from various left-wing political figures, including Jean-Luc Mélenchon of La France Insoumise, and major trade unions were initially hesitant to officially endorse the 10 September action, although they shared many of the movement's concerns about the proposed budget.

The movement was later taken over by the left and far-left in response to the Bayrou government's proposed 2026 budget disclosed on 15 July 2025, which aimed to cut €43.8 billion from public spending. The budget included controversial measures such as the removal of two French national holidays, a freeze on pensions in France, and significant cuts to healthcare in France. The slogan "Boycott, disobedience and solidarity" (Boycott, désobéissance et solidarité) began circulating on social media platforms like X (formerly Twitter), TikTok, Telegram, and Facebook, coalescing around the hashtags #10septembre2025 and #10septembre. Polls by french media said that out of 400,000 Twitter posts mentioning the movement, 70% were positive.

Commentators have noted both similarities and differences between Bloquons tout and the earlier Yellow Vests movement. While both are grassroots movements that originated on social media, a study by sociologist Antoine Bristielle found that Bloquons tout supporters are generally younger, more aligned with the political left, and more focused on collective interests and environmental concerns. The two dozen organizers of the movement, called Les Essentiels (the Essentials) had described themselves as "apolitical" and unconnected to the trade unions.

In terms of methods and organisation, the movement has been compared to the yellow vests movement of 2018, while in terms of political support, the Bloquons tout protests are left-leaning, differently from the largely apolitical yellow vest mobilisations. According to the French political scientist Antoine Bristielle, movements organised from social media like the yellow vests or bloquons tout aren't comparable to those supported by the main French trade unions, which usually mobilise greater numbers.

== Goals ==
The movement's core goal was a "total shutdown" of the country on 10 September 2025. Supporters were encouraged to avoid work, avoid shopping at large retailers, keep children at home and engage in "peaceful occupation of symbolic locations".

== Actions ==
On September 10, hundreds of various actions against government policy took place, including roadblocks and blockades. CNN described the actions as "small but disruptive ", closing off key ring roads in Bordeaux, and otherwise Northern French cities like Rennes, Nantes, Caen and a road outside Gare du Nord in Paris. Protests were largely peaceful except for a bus in Rennes and a restaurant in the 1st arrondissement of Paris that were set on fire. On 12 September 2025, it was considered a strong possibility that the movement would continue, at least until the strike announced by French unions on September 18, 2025. Actions were continued and groups did not stop meeting, ensuring that the movement would last. Participation was of 200 000 to 300 000 people. After the 10 September, general assemblies were continued across France.

On 18 September 2025, trade union strikes were more important than actions on the 10th, as nine out of ten drugstores were closed and record strikes were recorded in middle and high schools. The Parisian metro network was disrupted on multiple lines. One Piece flags were seen in Paris, as used in protest by youth in the August 2025 Indonesian protests, the September 2025 Philippine protests, the 2025 Nepalese Gen Z protests. and the 2025 Malagasy protests. On the 18th, between 500 000 to one million people followed the movement. While rural assemblies generally carried on activities not reported nationwide, the Bloquons tout movement in large cities decided to follow the schedule proposed by France's trade unions. However, many members criticise the previous schedule (18 September and 2 October 2025) chosen by the Intersyndicale coalition, in hopes of establishing mobilisation dates independent of French trade unions.

On 10 December 2025, roughly dozens of people met up and celebrated the third monthiversary of the movement, with some of them stating that when "something will happen again", the movement would return to life.

== Commentary ==
The results of the mobilization are a matter of debate. Thanks to the previous measures taken by the French Interior Ministry, led by Bruno Retailleau, in preparation for the movement, the first day of mobilization did not see a total paralysis, as previously feared.

== See also ==
- Yellow vests protests
- Protests against Emmanuel Macron

== Sources ==
- Bertrand, Solenne (22 July 2025). ""Un arrêt total et illimité du pays": c'est quoi ce mouvement qui appelle à bloquer la France "à partir du 10 septembre"?" ["A total and unlimited shutdown of the country": what is this movement calling for the blocking of France "from September 10"?]. Le Parisien (in French).
- Bristielle, Antoine (1 September 2025). "«Bloquons tout»: tentative de portrait-robot d'un mouvement nébuleux" ["Let's block everything": an attempt at a composite sketch of a nebulous movement]. Fondation Jean-Jaurès (in French).
- Conradi, Peter (6 September 2025). "Let's block everything: protesters plan to 'pull the brake' on France". The Sunday Times.
- Gabel, Barbara; York, Joanna (3 September 2025). "'Block everything': What we know about the movement to shut down France on September 10". France 24.
