= 1984 French protests =

Education protests in France

The 1984 protests in France were mass protests and a wave of strikes that affected France between June 22–25 after new plans to bring private schools under state control. Thousands participated in the rioting on 25 June, but for the first 3 days, between 850,000 and one million citizens took to the streets in the largest street demonstrations and opposition movement since 1968. Demonstrations culminated into violence as troops clashed with students protesting the new plans. The Bastille was stormed on 25 June, after days of nationwide protests, especially in Paris. François Mitterrand, who was president at the time, ordered police to quell dissent and withdrew the new bills. Despite this, demonstrations intensified, with protests turned into chaos, with the movement being largely suppressed.
