= Angelets =

Catalan peasant rebels, 1667–1675

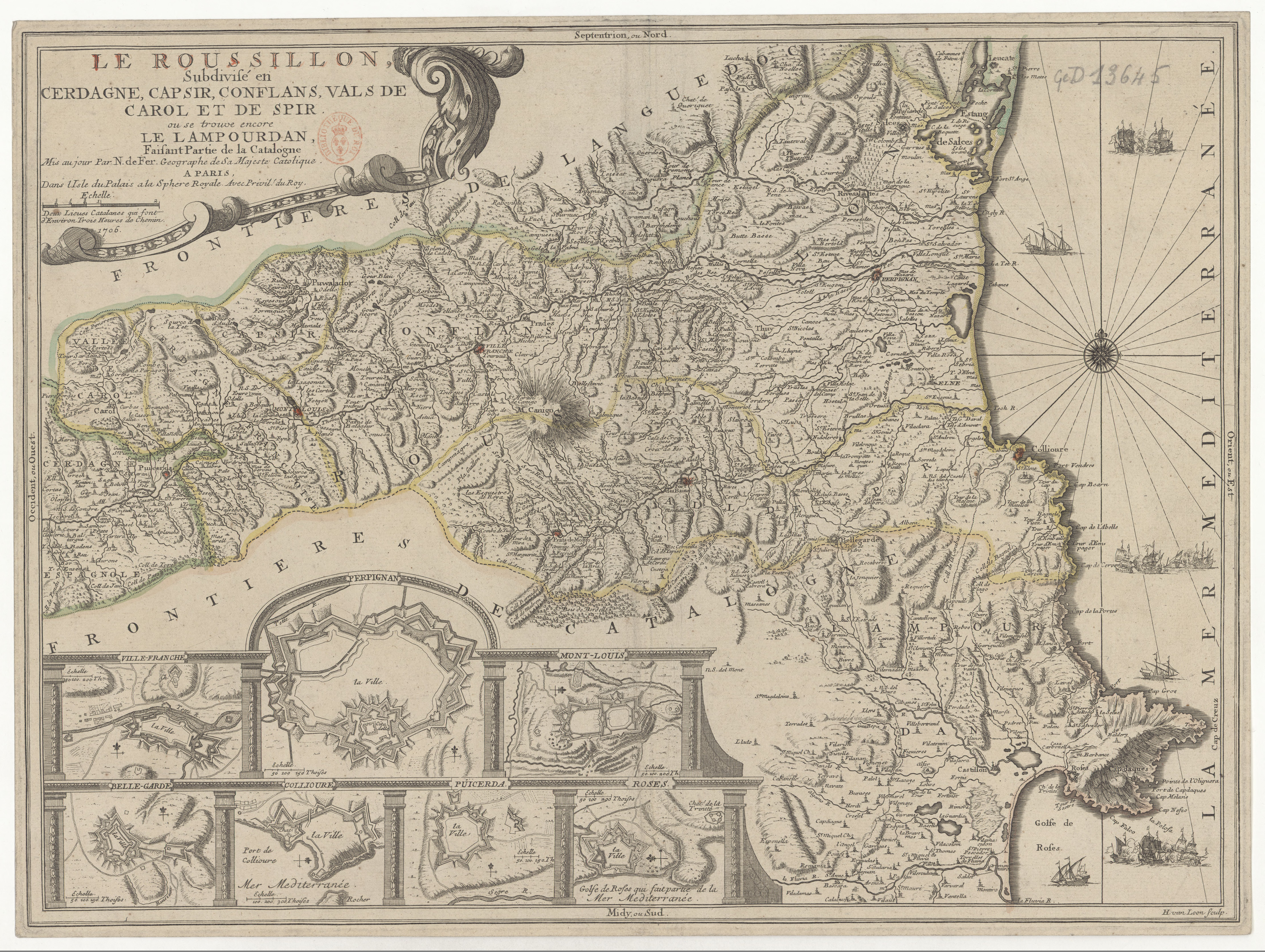
Map of the province of Roussillon by Nicolas de Fer (1706)

The Angelets, or “Angelets of the Land” (in Catalan, “Angelets de la Terra”), were peasants who rose up in peasant revolts from 1667 to 1675 against the French authorities in Roussillon; the group of conflicts of the period is called the Revolt of the Angelets. The cause was the institution of the gabelle, a tax on salt, in 1661—a measure contrary to the traditional Constitutions of Catalonia applied to the earldoms (the earldoms of Roussillon and Cerdanya, both lands of the Principality of Catalonia from 1172 to 1659). The revolt first concerned the county of Vallespir, then it spread to those of Conflent and Roussillon.

== Name ==
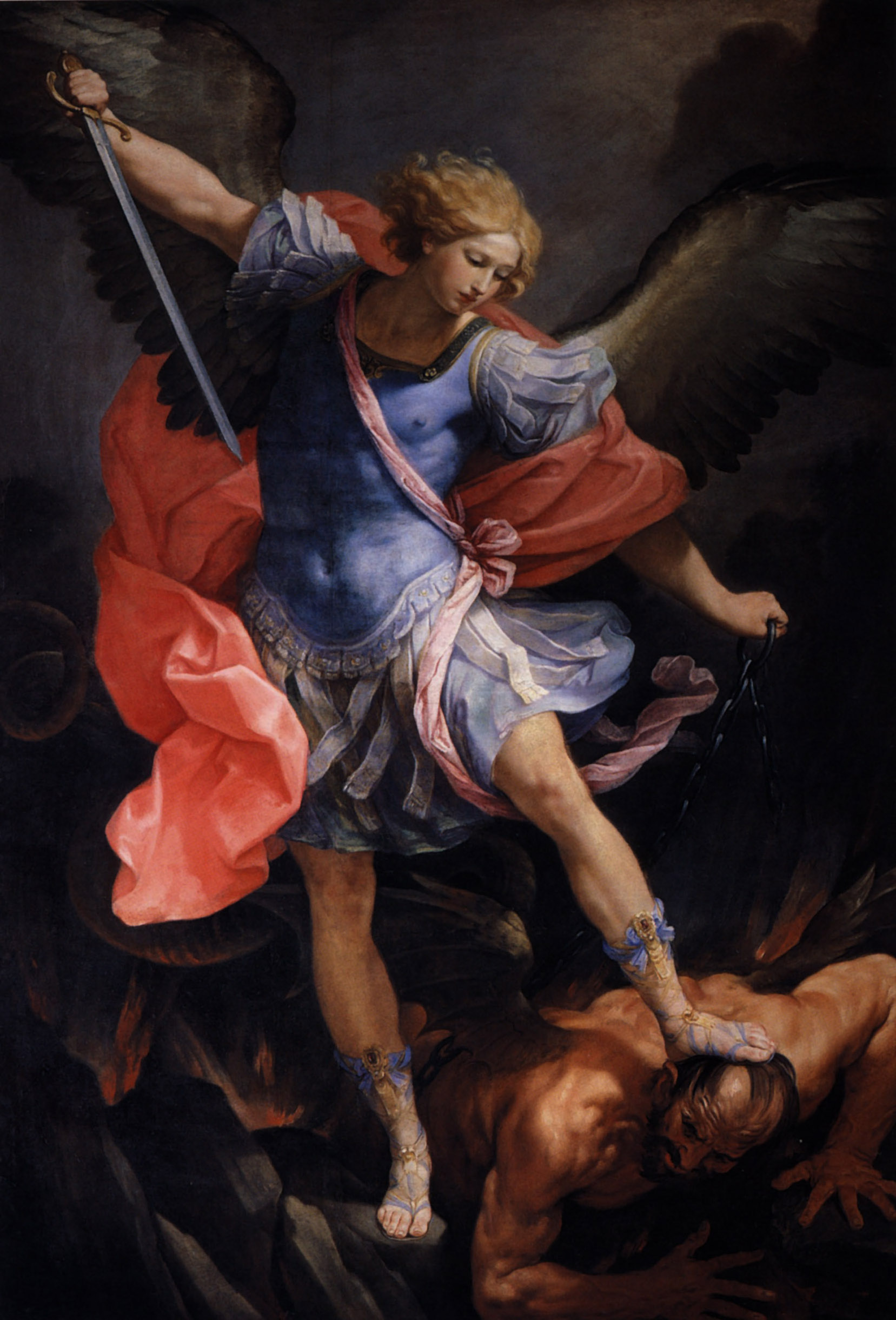
The archangel of Saint Michael

The reason why the revolts are referred to as “angelets” is unknown. One of the explanations advanced is the popular belief according to which the angels know the mountains well; another is the faculty that they have of appearing and disappearing.

As for the word “miquelets,” it refers primarily to Catalan mercenaries but sometimes to armed peasants. There is thus confusion among the ancient authors, particularly in relation to the war of Holland: They designate under the name “miquelets” all those who, in the province of Roussillon, oppose the king of France—though it be angelets or Catalan mercenaries in the service of the king of Spain.

Archangel Michael is the patron saint of the miquelets and the wool-workers of Prats-de-Mollo, he who gave a tint to one revolt that reclaimed liberties with the cry of “Visca la terra!” (“Long live the Land!”)

== Context ==
On May 8, 1659, the Catalan Revolt came to an end, and on November 7, the Treaty of the Pyrenees was signed between the Spanish and the French monarchies. The agreement notably foresaw a division of the Principality of Catalonia between the two sovereigns. The crown of France annexed five comarques (corresponding to the two counties, minus lower Cerdanya and Llívia):

- the comarques of Roussillon
- Vallespir
- Conflent
- Capcir
- the burghs and villages of French Cerdagne, that is the east of the count of Cerdagne

Louis XIV engaged himself with respecting the local customs. But, since June 1660, he replaced Catalan institutions and agencies with his own political, judiciary, and fiscal structures. He created a sovereign Council at Perpignan. Then he named a steward.

Resistance to the new master began in March 1661. Having come to settle a disagreement between the inhabitants of Ayguatébia and those of Oreilla, the viguier (magistrate) Marsal was violently attacked. He succeeded in escaping, but the notary and the domestic who accompanied him were killed. Immediately, the comarque of Conflent was subjected to a tax intended to pay the sometent français (the militia).

=== Gabelle ===
The gabelle, a tax on salt, had been abolished by the Catalan Courts since the time of King James II of Majorca, in 1283. In 1661, the French reestablished it. Its revenue was intended to finance the maintenance and construction of fortresses, as well as the payment of French functionaries. The measure was very unpopular. The king of France's misuse of this tax's revenue — to the detriment of Perpignan, which was only cashing an insignificant part of it — was considered an abjuration of the royal oath to respect the capital privileges of the comarque of Roussillon. The consuls of Perpignan protested. But the sovereign Council's decision rejected the municipal complaint and imposed the will of the Louvre.

In Vallespir, a country of pastures, salt was necessary for feeding livestock and preserving meat. The inhabitants sent for it from the other side of the wholly new border. The tax made its price rise inordinately. In 1667, the peasants of Vallespir refused to pay it.

== First Revolt (1667–68) ==
Smuggling was organized. The inspectors tracked down the traffickers in order to try to put an end to this activity. The peasants reacted, transforming themselves into veritable guerrilla fighters, harassing the French soldiers and especially the functionaries of the salt tax. An armed resistance was organized under the leadership of Joseph of Trinxeria, a merchant of Prats-de-Mollo.

The insurgents spread themselves in the county of Vallespir. In 1667, they hid in the villages of Serralongue and Montferrer. The following year, they attacked the hotel of Amélie-les-Bains, where the tax collectors are housed. They besieged the deputy provost Maniel in the church of Saint-Laurent-de-Cerdans. The repression did not rest: eight inhabitants were condemned to death and 51 put into slavery. This did nothing to discourage the smugglers.

The president of the sovereign Council, the collaborator Francesc de Segarra, offered a reward of 100 gold doubles tournois (coins) to whoever would give information against the leaders of the resistance. On September 14, 1668, he left with 300 soldiers to make base at Arles in order to begin a harsh suppression. The punitive expedition was routed at Llop pass and had to retreat to Arles.

For several years, the rebels, knowing the terrain well, inflicted substantial losses on the French troops. From August 3, 1667, to June 30, 1668, they also pursued and eliminated a good number of salt tax inspectors.

The authorities of the salt tax resolved to negotiate: The armed struggle ceased and, in exchange, the townships of Vallespir could obtain smuggled salt. Through the “Compromise of Céret,” the salt tax inspectors began to put an end to the controls and to coordinate with the council of each village, as to who would be charged from then on with the distribution of salt to the inhabitants.

== Second Revolt (1670–74) ==
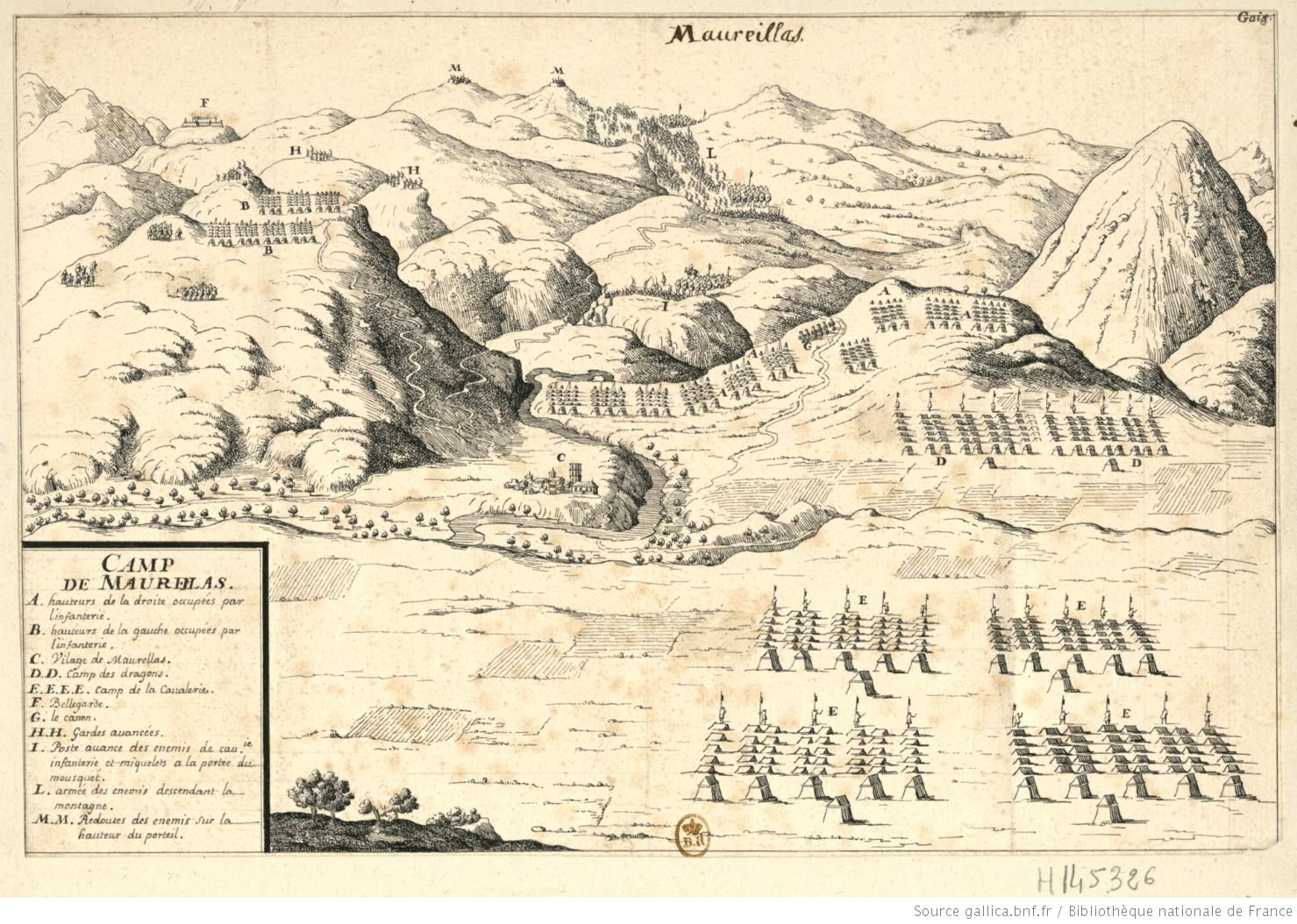
Battle plan near Maureillas in 1674

In 1669, in Conflent, Joan Miquel Mestre, called “the Righteous Heir,” demanded a similar arrangement for Baillestavy. From September to November, he kept track of the customs officers. It was at that moment that the revolts were referred to under the name of “angelets.” Mestre was stopped by chance on the road from Camprodon on January 22, 1670, by the governor of Prats-de-Mollo. This set off a revolt on the part of the inhabitants, led by Josep de la Trinxeria and his lieutenant Damià Nohell, son of the mayor of Serralongue. They took the governor's wife and children hostage and negotiated their release in return for that of the Righteous Heir. The exchange completed, the angelets returned via the Tech, seeing their troops grow to 1,500 men.

At this moment the revolt not only began again but also intensified considerably. The fighting stretched to all of Vallespir: On February 27, 1670, the insurgents seized Arles, from which they chased the garrison and killed the mayor. From March 31 to April 2, they besieged Céret, the capital of Vallespir.

The angelets held the high valley of Tech as well as Conflent. This was when the French sent an army of 4,000 soldiers. Avoiding offering an easy target on the route from the valley, they progressed through the mountains of Haut-Conflent that separated the two comarques, in order to take Vallespir from the rear. The technique of guerrilla warfare did not allow for maintaining a lined-up battle, on open terrain, facing a complete army: On May 5, the angelets were defeated at the Queen's Pass, at the food of the Guillem Flat. Some took refuge in the Principality of Catalonia; others hid in the mountains. The last bastion of the angelets having been defeated, the village of Py was sentenced to be razed. Salt had to be scattered over its ruins.

=== Beginnings of war with the Dutch ===
Hostilities were revived by the Franco-Dutch War (1672–78), of which the Spanish front became one of the theaters. The struggle of the population then took the character of an anti-French uprising. The angelets collaborated with the Spanish monarchy (1673).

The village and church of Ayguatébia were burned by French troops on February 7, 1673.

The year 1674 was particularly difficult for the French, in the province of Roussillon. They would face conspiracies (Vilafranca and Perpignan) and an entry of Spanish troops.

=== The Vilafranca Conspiracy ===
The angelets were involved in the Vilafranca Conspiracy, which aimed to reunite the counties at the Principality of Catalonia, on “Holy Saturday” in 1674.

The conspiracy was discovered and its leader, Manuel Descatllar, was arrested. He was transferred to Perpignan where, under terrible torture, he confessed all of his activities. He was executed in the square of La Loge, Hauts-de-France on April 20, 1674. As for his companion Francesc Puig i Terrats, he was condemned to death and had his throat cut in public, in front of his own house, on May 16. His body was quartered. The four parts of him were exhibited at four points in the city. Many other conspirators paid for their involvement through the loss of their civic and patrimonial rights.

=== Repression and end of the revolt ===
The population was always in question. The king of Spain's troops crossed the frontier and took the fort of Bellegarde (beginning 1674). They controlled a great part of the province (Cerdagne and Vallespir, a part of Roussillon and of Conflent) after they won the Battle of Maureillas over the French army on July. It was only in 1675 that the Count of Schomberg, taking advantage of the Spanish withdrawal of troops to face the recent Revolt of Messina, took back Bellegarde and routed them once and for all.

The region was now overrun with the French troops. The repression reached the whole population: imprisonment, sentencing to the galleys, executions, confiscation of goods, and heavy fines imposed on the communes (that of Prats-de-Mollo was of 3,500 pounds, that of Saint-Laurent was of 1,600 pounds).

The revolt of the angelets ended by 1675. The hatreds were so exacerbated, and the cost of suppression was so high, that Louis XIV tried to exchange the counties in return for Flanders. But Charles II of Spain refused. The revolt being completely put out, the king of France renounced this exchange during negotiations of the Treaty of Nijmegen, which put an end, in 1678, to the Franco-Dutch War.
