= Mini World (Japanese magazine) =

English-learner's magazine in Japan

- issue 78, 2000
- First issue: 1988
- Final issue: 2001
- Country: Japan

Mini World was an English-language Japanese magazine which ran from 1988 to 2001. It had a vocabulary level of 2,000 words, equivalent to English standards of the third year of middle school in Japan.
