= Croquant rebellions =

French peasant revolts from 1594 to 1637

The croquant rebellions (French: révolte des croquants [ʁevɔltə de kʁɔkɑ̃]; Occitan: Susmauta deus Crocants) were several peasant revolts that erupted in Limousin, Quercy, and Perigord (France) and that extended through the southeast of the country in the latter part of the 16th and beginning of the 17th centuries.

They were caused by an increase in the estate and nobility taxation during a period of great misery among the peasantry after years of war, and fall within the category of the French religion wars. The croquants supported King Henry IV of France against the Catholic League and the nobles who participated in it. The religious motives were, however, marginal and the Croquant uprisings were, above all, rebellions against taxation. There were three of these rebellions, which took place in the years 1594, 1624, and 1637. The first finished with the reduction of taxes, the second with Donat and Barran, the leaders of the uprising, being executed, and the third finally conceding a general amnesty.

== The 1594/95 uprisings ==
=== Context ===
France was fighting the Spanish Habsburgs, and maintaining two battle fronts: along the Pyrenees and in Flanders and Lorraine. In the interior, the religious wars had been going on for 35 years, devastating the country. The peasants, like the inhabitants of the cities, bore the brunt of supporting the troops when they crossed or were stationed in their region. And between campaigns, a good part of those demobilized troops, composed of mercenaries, were wandering, looting, and extorting money from towns, villages, and castles. When King Henry IV of France came to the throne, the royal finances were on the brink of bankruptcy. The government of his Minister, Sully, embarked on a fiscal policy devoted to increasing the collection of taxes, not only to finance the wars, but also to cover important loans granted to the state by French financiers (among whom was found the high French clergy) and foreigners (English, Dutch, Swiss, and Italians).

Moreover, the huge cost of the war between the Catholic League nobles and the Huguenot nobles or supporters of Henry IV, made the nobility put still more pressure on their feudal subjects to collect taxes and force compliance with their feudal rights, each time more difficult for a peasant submerged in misery to bear.

Agitation in rural areas was almost constant during the conflict, but the peasant uprisings multiplied in the 1590s, as in Champagne, in the North and East of Paris, in Lower Normandy, Dauphine, Vivare, and Provence. The intensification and extension of the riots are noted around 1594, affecting most of the country within a broad movement of recurring revolts. In addition, the year 1593 had been particularly cold and rainy, so bad crops for the second consecutive year were expected.

=== Motives of the Uprisings ===
A document of the Parlement of Toulouse, cited by Ivan Luchitzkii, exposes in 1594 the motives of those frequent rebellions. Historian Henri Heller concludes from the document that the heavy taxation undoubtedly played an important role; looting, extortion, and the duty to accommodate and feed the soldiers of hosts were no less relevant. But the most relevant is the oppression exercised by the nobles, who were illegally demanding the payment of higher rents and manorial rights, and arbitrarily imposing new taxes and duties. Before the refusal of the farmers to pay, according to Parlement, the nobles were sending troops to the lands of the tenants to illegally seize their land and their bodies. Finally the nobles, in turn, refused to pay the taille and other taxes linked to the non-noble lands that they had just been acquiring.

The texts drawn up by the croquants of the Périgord region corroborate this analysis and add that they struggled against the tax collectors and their agents, who enriched themselves by taking advantage of their misery.

=== The Uprisings ===
From the Viscounty of Turenne in lower Limousin in 1594, the revolt spread rapidly to Périgord. According to the chronicle of Sarlat Jean Tarde the revolt emerged in the Limousin town of Crocq, in Combraille, which gave its name to the rebellion; historians, however, incline more to the explanation driven by another chronicler of the time, Pierre Victor Palma Cayet, in which the farmers were called croquants ("crispys") by those wealthy classes and tax collectors who were chewing them up "as snacks." The nickname was in turn repurposed against the bourgeoisie, the nobility, and the authorities, who thus contemptuously designated the farmers who attacked them. The peasants called themselves tard-avisés (got-wise) or chasse-voleurs (fighter-thieves).

From the beginning, the farmers organised themselves, first for their defence, managing to expel bands of mercenaries and bandits. They held assemblies in the forests, in which they pledged loyalty and drew up petitions setting forth their complaints and requests. They reached out to all the villages to inform them and to ask them to join in. In the parishes, "avisors" (from which the name "tard-avisés") created armed companies who chose their captain and his lieutenants, each one with its drums and colours. Those companies began to reconnoitre the region to the sound of the drum, forewarning the villages, the authorities, and the nobility of their arrival. One is either with them or against them, and whoever confronts them sees their property destroyed. In the assembly of April 23, it was decided that some emissaries would deliver a letter to King Henry IV so that he would not misinterpret their actions, another to the Monsieur de Bourdeille, governor of Périgord and charged with the security of the region, and others of the local magistrates, to inform them of the abuses committed by the nobility against the Third Estate and to ask for redress in the regional parliaments. In Périgord alone it is estimated that the companies of croquants amounted to 20,000 men. The movement expanded with extreme rapidity throughout Limousin and Poitou, reaching in the west to Angoumois and Saintonge, and in the south to Toulouse and the Comminges region. On the way, clashes with government troops multiplied during the summer of 1594.

These saw themselves overpowered and were not able to contain the advance of the peasant troops. According to Jean Tarde, there was one soldier for every 100 peasants, and their military organisation owed itself to the fact that a good number of artisans, "sons of good families" (some historians, such as Mousnier and Bercé, include some minor nobles, or squirearchs, joining the revolt), and former soldiers were accompanying them. On the other hand, although the King had decreed an end to the movement, he also had expressed a certain benevolence toward the rebels and had promised to hear their complaints, and so for months the nobles felt indecisive about the degree of violence to employ in the repression, and their answer was due soon. As the reinforcements that the governor of Bourdeille had asked the King for were slow in coming, the nobility and the wealthy classes of the cities organised their own armed League. Months later, the reinforcements required by the King arrived from Jean de Sourches de Malicorne, governor of Poitou, and Jean du Chasteigner, M. de Albin.

Meanwhile, the croquantes asked the King to recognize their official representative (a syndic) and delegated lawyers to the Parliaments (as in Périgueux in February, 1595) in the name of the "Third Estate of the low lands" (Tiers-Etat du pays plat), the name with which they called themselves. They swore their allegiance to the King, in an era in which many nobles were slow to recognize his authority, a conflict shown particularly by those nobles of the Catholic League. They asserted that the "thieves" they denounced were attacking not only them but also the royal power, and they proclaimed their respect for the established social hierarchy and that they only hoped that justice would be done. That said, the course of events and the violence employed gave the revolt a frankly anti-nobility look in many areas. As the available sources from the time usually collect highly geographically-localized data, this has led historians to diverge on this point according to the characteristics of the movement in the regions studied: while the French authors (Emmanuel Le Roy Ladurie, Yves-Marie Bercé, and Roland Mousnier) lean toward a fundamentally anti-tax movement, the English-speaking authors (Henry Heller, Pérez Zagorín) argue that the fight against the nobility as a whole had equal relevance.

=== End of the revolts ===
In the winter of 1594–95, famine extended over the regions affected by the conflict, and the price of grain shot up. The King made it known to the croquants that he pardoned them for their delays in paying the taille and that he was freezing its increases, as well as those of the gabelle. He also promised them that the abuses committed by the nobles and tax collectors would be investigated. In order to pacify the rebellious regions, he appointed a royal superintendent for the southeast of France, Jean-Robert de Thumery, M. de Boissize, who arrived in July 1595. He encountered resistance in the urban classes and in some feus they refused to negotiate. For their part, the croquants were often wary of the intentions of the local authorities, and splits appeared among the captains of the movement. Many battles still took place, although the movement was losing force. In the autumn of 1595, the croquants disarmed.

Although from their extent and intensity these first revolts of the croquants came to be considered a civil war, it is often called the "small war of the croquants." Their real bases are not known, but that it had occurred right at the end of the religious wars and after a deep crisis of monarchical power, highlights the clemency of King Henry IV and an uncanny effort of negotiation resulting in his efforts to bring all of France together and to reestablish and enhance the prestige of the monarchy.
