= Arson attacks in Grenoble =

Series of crimes in Grenoble, France

- Location: Grenoble metropolitan area and its surroundings, Auvergne-Rhône-Alpes, France
- Date: March 2017-present
- Attack type: Arson attacks
- Weapons: Improvised devices, molotov cocktails
- Injuries: 1 policeman

The wave of arson attacks in Grenoble is a series of arson attacks in France that have occurred since March 2017, in the Grenoble metropolitan area, the most publicized of which were those of the warehouse of the Isère Gendarmerie group and the France Bleu Isère radio station. All of these fires were meticulously prepared; some were not claimed, but most were by an anarchist movement. The perpetrators remain unknown to this day, only known are the statements on the internet.

== Attacks ==
=== 2017 ===
As precedent, on 6 January, a nativity scene and the Virgin Mary statue at the Saint Charles Cathedral in Saint-Etienne, Auvergne-Rhone-Alpes, were set on fire, leaving important material damage. On 21 March 2017, the headquarters of the Les Républicains party in Grenoble was vandalized. After the fact, this attack, claimed by the local anarchists movement, is considered by the Public Prosecutor of Grenoble and Le Dauphiné libéré, as the first in a series of criminal acts mainly consisting of arson. The massive arson attacks that took place in previous years, which were not claimed, were therefore not included in this wave by the Public Prosecutor.

In 23 March, targeted seven vehicles of the communal social action center, accused of "co-managing poverty". Five days later, seven other vehicles belonging to Grenoble-Alpes Métropole were burned in the name of "the fight against human resource storage and exploitation sites". On the night of 11 April, 185 ticket distributors and validators of the tramway network were put out of service and inscriptions such as "Never validate" were written on the windows of the targeted stations. The three actions were claimed each time by the group "Wild Individualities".

Then eleven Enedis vans, parked in a car park on Rue du Vercors, were set on fire on 30 May, causing 300.000 et 400.000 euros of damages. The act was claimed in the following hours by an anti-capitalist and libertarian cell called "Individualités sauvages" (Wild Individualities). On 8 June, an Enedis electricity distributor in Crest, Auvergne-Rhone-Alpes, was set fire leaving important material damage and affected nearly a 165,000 users, being claimed by Wild Individualities. A week later a TDF telecommunications pylon was burned in Piégros-la-Clastre,. There were no reported casualties in the attack. Wild Individualities and Children and Matches (Des enfants et des allumettes) separately claimed responsibility for the attack. On 18 July, a TDF base station in Saint-Laurent-sous-Coiron were attacked by members of Wild Individualities. During the summer, premises belonging to Enedis and TDF antennas were targeted in the neighboring departments of Drôme and Ardèche, being claimed for the cell "Conspiracy of Complicit and Chaotic Individuals" (Konspiration d’Individualités Complices et Kaotiques).

On 19 September, five gendarmerie vehicles were burned in Limoges, Nouvelle-Aquitaine, leaving important material damage. Another fire broke out two days later, destroying around thirty vehicles in a warehouse of more than 1500 m2 (16145.87 square feet) at a gendarmerie barracks car park in Vigny-Musset in Grenoble, leaving one officer intoxicated by smoking when approach to the area. The Nocturnals and the "Révolte anarchiste contre les gendarmes en exil" (Anarchist Revolt Against Exiled Gendarmes) separately claimed responsibility both attacks and stated that the attack was carried out in support of those currently at trial.

The facts were immediately claimed on an anarcho-libertarian site, already used for similar acts perpetrated in Limoges a few days earlier. A month later, the Meylan gendarmerie, in the suburbs of Grenoble, was the scene of an arson attack in which four cars and a motorcycle were set on fire at the foot of the residential accommodation of this gendarmerie, forcing the 24 occupants to urgently evacuate. Investigators are focusing far-left attackers lead in this fire, but the attack were claimed by a feminist cell, carrying the attack to "fight sexism" and "gender" and was perpetrated as a "desire for revenge".

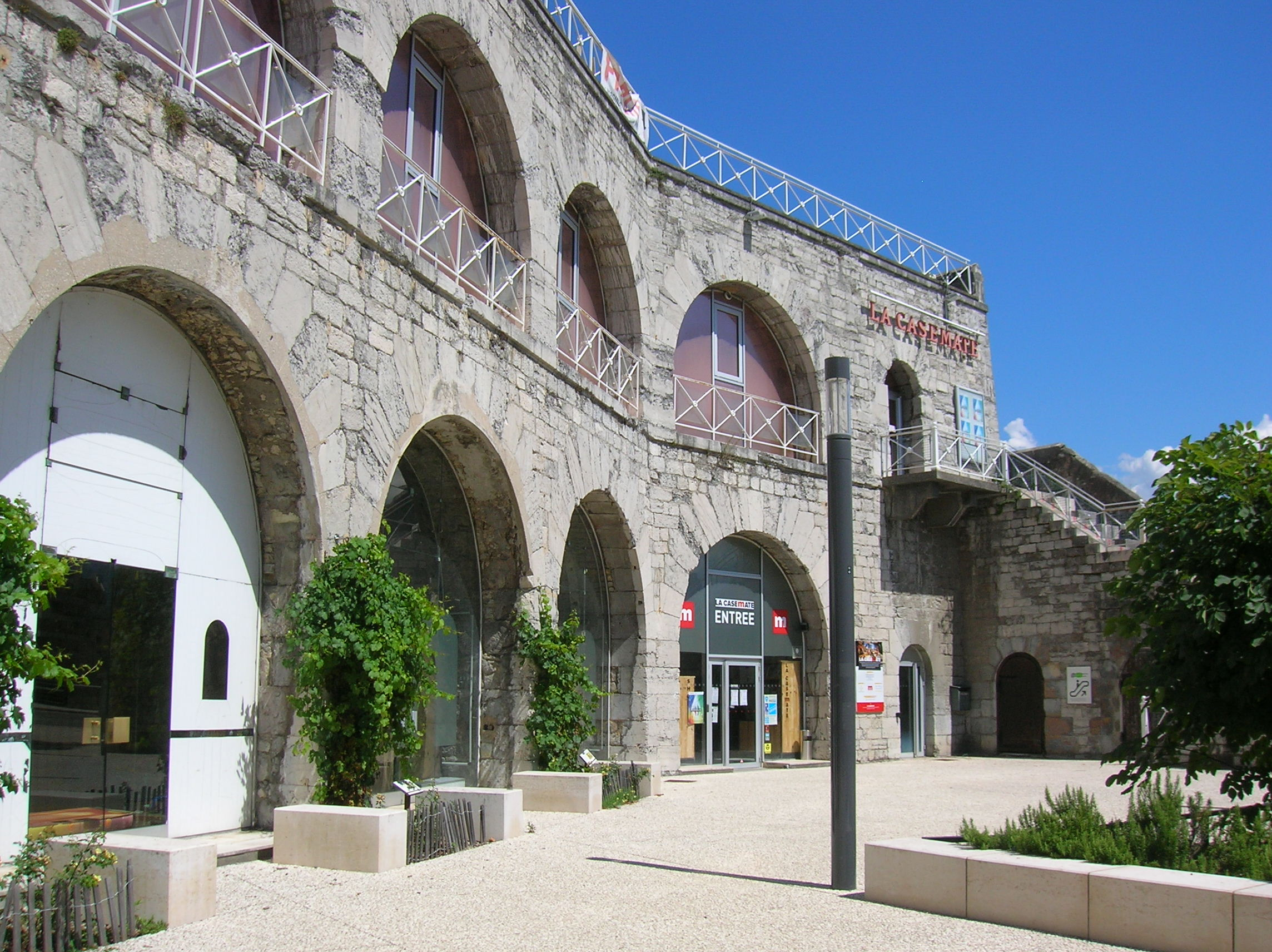
The CCSTI of Grenoble before the fire of 21 November 2017

Weeks later (21 November), the CCSTI of Grenoble to be ravaged by a fire destroying its Fab lab The criminal act, the damage of which is estimated at several million euros. is also claimed on a website close to anarchists circles. In the days that followed, the staff of this center, nicknamed "La Casemate", received numerous testimonies of support, including some from the United States, Norway and Japan. The entire first floor having been destroyed, its reopening is planned for the month of April 2020.

=== 2018 ===
Until 2018, a series of fires in large commercial establishments were the subject of articles in Le Dauphiné libéré; as in previous fires, investigators are exploring all leads. Fires occur in the urban area during the night, such as the one at the DIY store Bricoman of 4000 m2 in Bresson, in the suburbs near Grenoble, on 23 June, for which France Bleu Isère mentions a fire of electrical origin, or that of the Euromaster garage of 2000 m2 in Saint-Martin-d'Hères, on the night of 10 to 11 December, which forced the evacuation of 101 people from the neighboring Belledonne clinic in the middle of the night.

In the disaster, 4300 tires in storage go up in smoke, for this last case, the criminal nature of the facts was confirmed in the morning, but without the prosecution being able to establish a link with the previous arson attacks claimed by anarchists. On 23 April, the Comradeship of Costly Greens (Amicale Verts Cherts) claimed the burn of four trucks at the premises of a towing company in Saint-Herblain.

On 28 September, a slaughterhouse was burned in Haut Valromey, Auvergne-Rhone-Alpes, being claimed by animal rights extremists. It was not until 8 October, the warehouse of the company Eiffage, in Saint-Martin-d'Hères, was also targeted and the action was claimed on the site Indymedia Nantes, by the fact that "this company occupies a fundamental function in our prison society" by providing "the material structure necessary for the punishment industry". Seven trucks and four utility vehicles were destroyed, putting 70 people out of work and was claimed by the "Renard" group (Foxes’ Module).

=== 2019 ===
In early January 2019, several stairwells were set on fire during the night in building lobbies in the city centre. On the night of 16 to 17 January 2019, the Saint-Jacques church, on rue de Chamrousse, was completely destroyed by a fire, forcing the evacuation of 106 local residents by emergency services. Learning that a text published on Indymedia claimed responsibility for the disaster, the media Place gre'net used humor by titling "Anonymous "short circuits" claim responsibility for the fire at the Saint-Jacques church in Grenoble". but the accidental theory of electrical origin remains nevertheless evoked, the public prosecutor of Grenoble, Eric Vaillant, not excluding an opportunistic claim.

A few days later, during the night of 27 to 28 January, the premises of the France Bleu Isère station on Avenue Félix-Viallet were completely ravaged by a fire of voluntary origin, a door having been broken. The radio frequencies are recovered from 6 am by France Bleu Pays de Savoie, which retraces the events of the night, while France 3 Alpes immediately offers to accommodate the radio staff in its premises. A special broadcast can thus take place from 5:30 p.m., with numerous reactions from listeners and personalities on the phone, including the Minister of Culture Franck Riester. On 29 January, a TDF transmitter was set fire in Jarrie, Auvergne-Rhone-Alpes, being claimed the attack by anarchists,

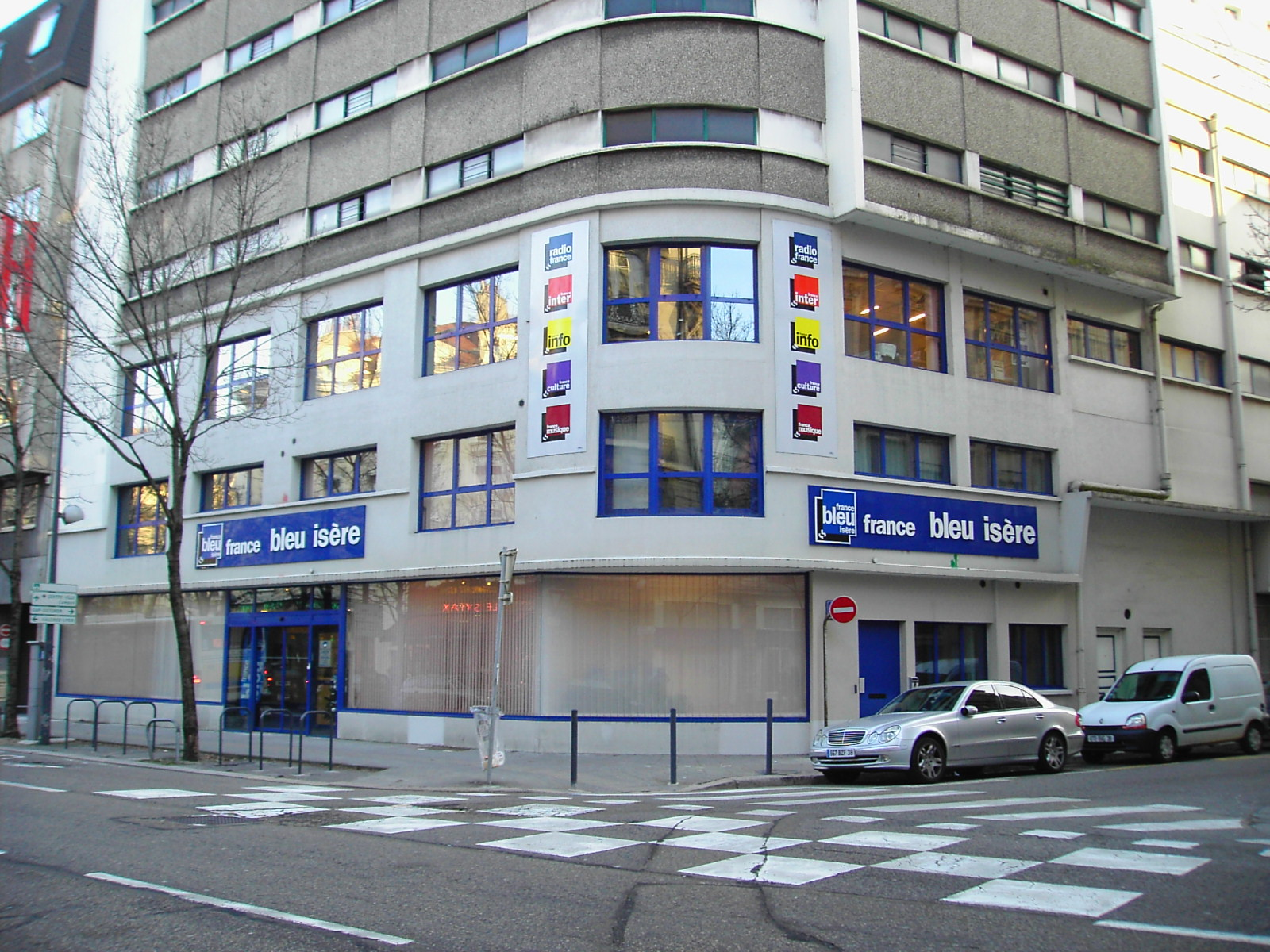
France Bleu Isère premises before their fire on 27 January 2019.

On 12 February, the advertising display company JCDecaux, located in Fontaine and responsible for maintaining the city's bus shelters, was the target of an arson attack that destroyed 50 m2 of premises and damaged a hundred more by the smoke released. The criminal nature of the incident was confirmed by the authorities at the end of the day, while the next day, the authors of a text published on Indymedia claimed the attack.

In early March, rioters started a fire in a public building, but these events cannot be linked to the ongoing wave of arson attacks. On 17 July, eight cars from the EDF fleet were set on fire.

On 30 September, a fire completely destroyed several rooms in the Grenoble City Hall, including the city council building; traces of fuel were discovered on site. A month later, the act was claimed on Indymedia by a text castigating the municipal majority led by the environmentalist Éric Piolle, accused of selling the benefits of the SmartCity and hiding the gloom behind (the) facades of eco-friendly eco-districts. The room will not reopen until May 2024 at a cost of 600,000 euros, which will be borne by the taxpayer.

In the meantime, on 8 October 2019, the prosecutor revealed to the press the criminal nature of the fire at the Saint-Jacques church that occurred in January and reclassifies the facts. Bishop Guy de Kerimel promises to rebuild the church. of which only the bell tower and its cross remained standing, but it will ultimately never be rebuilt in order to make way for 125 housing units.

On 26 November 2019, 350 police officers and gendarmes conducted searches in five squats in Fontaine and Grenoble, known to be frequented by members of the alternative movement and the Yellow Vests, as well as in the ZAD of Roybon Computer equipment was seized and DNA samples were taken from those present. No arrests were made in connection with the wave of damage and fires, but five people were placed in administrative detention center and two were subject to an obligation to leave French territory.

=== 2020 ===
On 13 January 2020, an Enedis hangar located in Seyssinet-Pariset was completely burned down, resulting in the destruction of 15 vehicles for a loss of two million euros. The act was claimed the same day and presented as a response to the "wave of searches" at the end of November 2019. The same day, the Grenoble public prosecutor announced that he had asked the national anti-terrorism prosecutor's office to resume the investigation, considering that the acts carried out "can be considered terrorist attacks"56. The next day, the PNAT declined the request, which the Grenoble prosecutor had already made several times, without winning the case. The following day, the PNAT declined the request, which the Grenoble prosecutor had already made several times, without success.

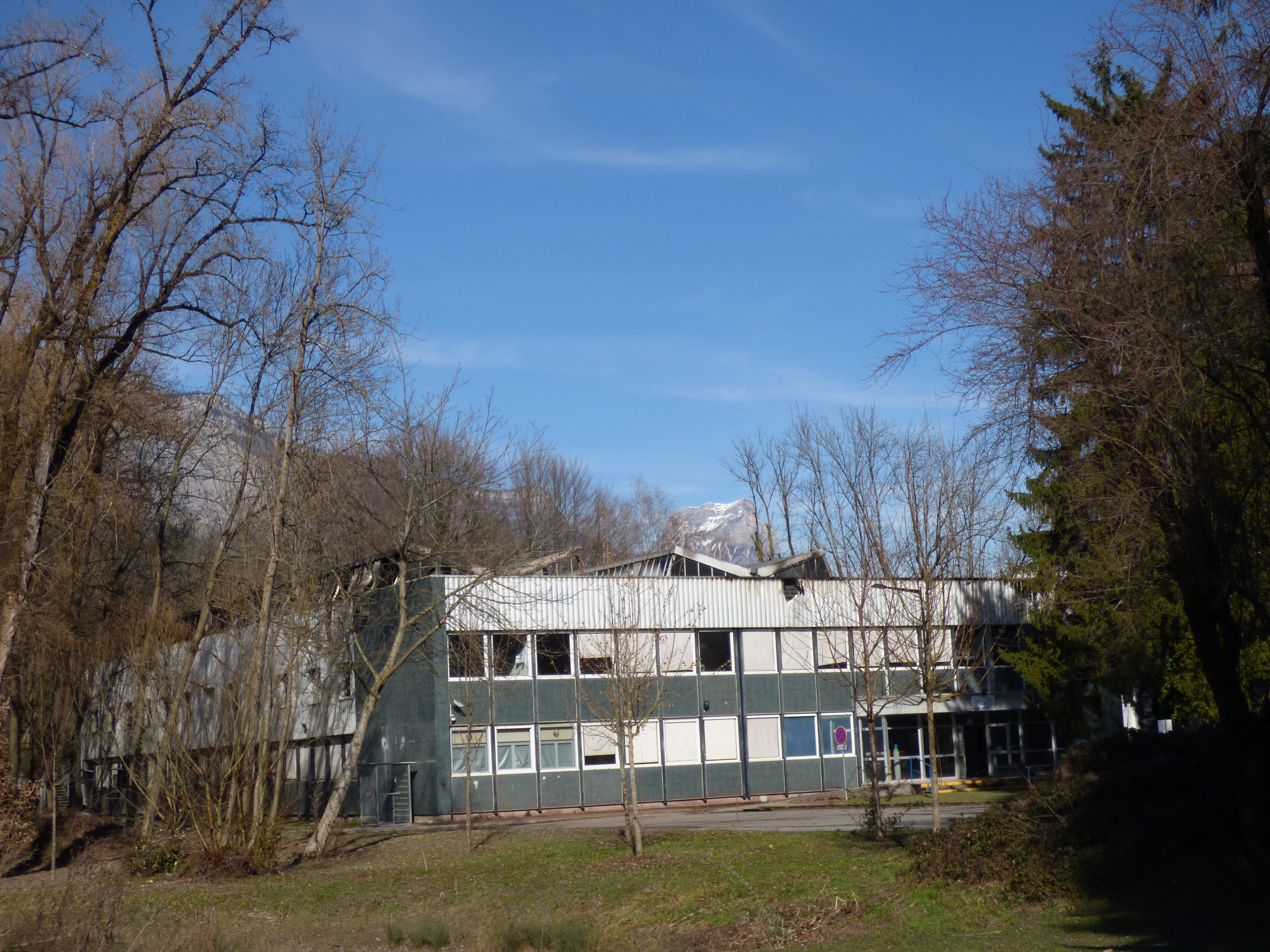
The Eiffel building of the 3SR laboratory after the arson attack.

Another intentional fire occurred on 24 February in the Eiffel building of the university campus, destroying 700 m2 of a research laboratory (3SR) belonging to the French National Centre for Scientific Research and the Grenoble Alpes University. ·

On 18 May, unclaimed fires damaged the Jarrie and Tour sans Venin television broadcasting relays at around 3h , preventing several national or local radio stations and television channels from broadcasting in the Grenoble metropolitan area and also affecting the operation of telephone operators.

=== 2021 ===
On the night of 19 to 20 February, the company Constructel located in Sassenage and specializing in the installation of optical fiber was the target of an arson attack destroying a relay antenna, cable stocks and a platform vehicle. This fire, as well as another similar one that occurred a few days earlier in Brézins are claimed by the libertarian ultra-left.

=== 2022 ===
On 3 and 4 April 2022, several sites belonging to the Réseau de Transport d'Électricité (RTE) were set on fire in the vicinity of Grenoble. These fires caused power outages and significant damage. On site, investigators noted the presence of anarchist inscriptions, leading the Grenoble Public Prosecutor's Office to suspect the involvement of the ultra-left movement in these acts.

The next day, the most spectacular fire affected high-voltage lines running under the Brignoud bridge and supplying the semiconductor manufacturers Soitec and STMicroelectronics in Crolles, shutting down their production for a few hours and causing their stock price to fall. Shutting down their production for a few hours and causing. Despite the bridge reopening to pedestrians on 2 May, the local economy is also seriously affected and a project to rebuild the bridge used daily by 27,000 vehicles is being considered by the department. A new road bridge parallel to the old one will be put into service at the end of 2026 at a cost of 24 million euros.

=== 2023 ===
On the 25th of September, a pylon carrying two power lines, one of which was high-voltage, was set on fire in Seyssinet-Pariset. The Grenoble public prosecutor favors the anarchists lead in this unclaimed act.

== Perpetrators ==
This attacks usually are perpetrated by anarchists cells (sometimes anonymous), the modus operanti of the groups includes usually claimed in antistablishment websites, attacking in late at night and use of names in few actions. One of the cells called Individualités Sauvages, claimed a series of attacks in 2017, being inactive months later. The other of the first cells Révolte Anarchiste des Gendarmes Exilés, shortened by RAGE, claimed another ring of attacks. The Nocturnes claimed an attack on a hangar of the local police forensics service in Grenoble, being the groups only attack registered. In the same year the cell Konspiration d’Individualités Complices et Kaotiques other attacks, like wise the "Enfants avec des Allumettes" (Kids with Matches").

== Reactions from political figures ==
For Laurent Wauquiez, the government is indifferent to these fires. After the fire at the town hall, Alain Carignon, candidate in the 2020 municipal elections in Grenoble, recalled that in April 2017, the security commission issued an unfavorable opinion on the continued operation of the town hall and that, in September 2018, the Regional Audit Office included in its recommendations to "conduct a study quantifying the cost of bringing the town hall up to standard".
