= Alan Brandi =

Spanish-born Argentine footballer

Personal information
- Full name: Alan Brandi Cuasnicú
- Date of birth: 24 November 1987 (age 38)
- Place of birth: Las Palmas, Spain
- Height: 1.82 m (6 ft 0 in)
- Position: Pivot

Team information
- Current team: Jaén FS
- Number: 14

Senior career*
Years	Team	Apps	(Gls)
2007–2011	Colmenarejo		
2011–2012	Inter Movistar		
2012–2013	Santiago		
2013–2016	Benfica		
2016–2017	Acqua e Sapone		
2017–	Jaén FS		

International career
2015–	Argentina		
Medal record
Representing Argentina
Men's Futsal
FIFA Futsal World Cup
Gold medal – first place	2016 Colombia
Silver medal – second place	2024 Uzbekistan
- * Club domestic league appearances and goals

Alan Brandi Cuasnicú (born 24 November 1987) is an Argentine professional futsal player who plays for Jaén FS of First Division of LNFS and the Argentina national team.

== Honours ==
Benfica

- Liga Portuguesa: 2014–15
- Taça de Portugal: 2014–15
- Supertaça de Portugal: 2015

Jaén

- Copa de España: 2018, 2023

Argentina

- FIFA Futsal World Cup: 2016
- Copa América de Futsal: 2022
