= City'US Târgu Mureș =

City'us Târgu Mureş
- Full name: City'us Târgu Mureş
- Founded: 2004
- Dissolved: 2018
- Ground: Sala Sporturilor, Târgu Mureş, Romania
Home colours	Away colours

City'us Târgu Mureş was a futsal club based in Târgu Mureş, Romania. The club was dissolved in 2018 due to financial problems.

== Achievements ==
- Liga I: 2010, 2011, 2012, 2013, 2015, 2016
- Romanian Futsal Cup: 2008, 2009, 2010, 2011, 2012, 2013, 2014
- Romanian Super Cup: 2010
