= Futsal Awards =

Annual sports award

- Sport: Futsal
- Awarded for: Annual best in international futsal
- Sponsored by: JAKO (since 2024)
- Presented by: Futsalplanet.com

History
- First award: 2000
- Editions: 26 (as of 2025)
- Most wins: Men's (Portugal) Ricardinho (6 wins); Women's (Brazil) Amandinha (8 wins)
- Website: Futsalplanet.com

The JAKO Futsal Awards are the annual awards to celebrate the best people in international futsal. They are presented since the year of 2000 by FutsalPlanet.

== Best Player in the World ==
=== Male ===
Year	Winner	Club
2000	(Brazil) Manoel Tobias	(Brazil) Vasco da Gama
2001	(Brazil) Manoel Tobias (2)	(Brazil) Jaraguá
2002	(Brazil) Manoel Tobias (3)	(Spain) FS Cartagena
2003	(Italy) Adriano Foglia	(Italy) Stabia
2004	(Brazil) Falcão	(Brazil) Jaraguá
2005	(Spain) Javi Rodríguez	(Spain) Playas de Castellón
2006	(Brazil) Falcão (2)	(Brazil) Jaraguá
2007	(Russia) Vladislav Shayakhmetov	(Russia) Viz-Sinara
2008	(Brazil) Schumacher	(Spain) Inter FS
2009	(Spain) Kike	(Spain) ElPozo Murcia
2010	(Portugal) Ricardinho	
2011	(Brazil) Falcão (3)	(Brazil) Santos
2012	(Brazil) Falcão (4)	(Brazil) Intelli
2013	(Spain) Sergio Lozano	(Spain) Barcelona
2014	(Portugal) Ricardinho (2)	(Spain) Inter FS
2015	(Portugal) Ricardinho (3)	(Spain) Inter FS
2016	(Portugal) Ricardinho (4)	(Spain) Inter FS
2017	(Portugal) Ricardinho (5)	(Spain) Inter FS
2018	(Portugal) Ricardinho (6)	(Spain) Inter FS
2019	(Brazil) Ferrão	(Spain) Barcelona
2020	(Brazil) Ferrão (2)	(Spain) Barcelona
2021	(Brazil) Ferrão (3)	(Spain) Barcelona
2022	(Portugal) Pany Varela	(Portugal) Sporting CP
2023	(Brazil) Pito	(Spain) Barcelona
2024	(Brazil) Dyego Zuffo	(Spain) Barcelona
2025	(Brazil) Fabinho	(Spain) Palma Futsal

=== Female ===
Year	Winner	Club
2007	(Spain) Eva Manguán	(Spain) Atlético Navalcarnero
2008	(Brazil) Cilene	(Brazil) Jaguaré
2009	(Ukraine) Alina Gorobets	(Ukraine) FK Belichanka-93
2010	(Brazil) Vanessa	(Spain) Burela
2011	(Brazil) Vanessa (2)	(Brazil) UnoChapecó
2012	(Brazil) Vanessa (3)	(Brazil) UnoChapecó
2013	(Brazil) Lú	(Italy) Lazio Calcio a 5
2014	(Brazil) Amandinha	(Brazil) Barateiro
2015	(Brazil) Amandinha (2)	(Brazil) Barateiro
2016	(Brazil) Amandinha (3)	(Brazil) Barateiro
2017	(Brazil) Amandinha (4)	(Brazil) Leoas da Serra
2018	(Brazil) Amandinha (5)	(Brazil) Leoas da Serra
2019	(Brazil) Amandinha (6)	(Brazil) Leoas da Serra
2020	(Brazil) Amandinha (7)	(Brazil) Leoas da Serra
2021	(Brazil) Amandinha (8)	(Spain) Torreblanca Melilla
2022	(Spain) Peque	(Spain) Alcorcón FSF
2023	(Brazil) Camila	(Brazil) Stein Cascavel
2024	(Brazil) Emilly	(Spain) Burela FC
2025	(Brazil) Emilly (2)	(Spain) Burela FC

== Best Goalkeeper in the World ==
=== Male ===
Year	Winner	Club
2003	(Spain) Luis Amado	(Spain) Inter FS
2004	(Spain) Luis Amado (2)	(Spain) Inter FS
2005	Not assigned	
2006	Not assigned	
2007	(Brazil) Tiago	(Brazil) Malwee/Jaraguá
2008	(Russia) Sergey Zuev	(Russia) Sinara Yekaterinburg
2009	(Argentina) Santiago Elías	(Argentina) Pinocho
2010	(Iran) Mostafa Nazari	(Iran) Foolad Mahan
2011	(Italy) Stefano Mammarella	(Italy) Montesilvano
2012	(Italy) Stefano Mammarella (2)	(Italy) Montesilvano
2013	(Russia) Gustavo	(Russia) Dinamo Moskva
2014	(Italy) Stefano Mammarella (3)	(Italy) Acqua e Sapone
2015	(Kazakhstan) Leo Higuita	(Kazakhstan) Kairat
2016	(Kazakhstan) Leo Higuita (2)	(Kazakhstan) Kairat
2017	(Spain) Paco Sedano	(Spain) FC Barcelona
2018	(Kazakhstan) Leo Higuita (3)	(Kazakhstan) Kairat
2019	(Kazakhstan) Leo Higuita (4)	(Kazakhstan) Kairat
2020	(Kazakhstan) Leo Higuita (5)	(Kazakhstan) Kairat
2021	(Brazil) Guitta	(Portugal) Sporting CP
2022	(Spain) Dídac Plana	(Spain) Barcelona
2023	(Brazil) Willian	(Brazil) JEC/Krona Joinville
2024	(Armenia) Luan Muller	(Spain) Palma
2025	(Uruguay) Mathias Fernández	(Uruguay) Peñarol

=== Female ===
Year	Winner	Club
2015	(Spain) Belén de Uña	(Spain) Atlético Navalcarnero
2016	(Spain) Belén de Uña (2)	(Spain) AD Alcorcón FSF
2017	(Spain) Estela García	(Spain) Atlético Navalcarnero
2018	(Portugal) Ana Catarina	(Portugal) Benfica
2019	(Spain) Silvia Aguete	(Spain) Poio Pescamar
2020	(Portugal) Ana Catarina (2)	(Portugal) Benfica
2021	(Portugal) Ana Catarina (3)	(Portugal) Benfica
2022	(Brazil) Bianca	(Brazil) Stein Cascavel (Italy) Bitonto C5 Femminile
2023	(Brazil) Bianca (2)	(Italy) Bitonto C5 Femminil (Brazil) Stein Cascavel
2024	(Portugal) Ana Catarina (4)	(Portugal) Benfica
2025	(Portugal) Ana Catarina (5)	(Portugal) Benfica

== Best Young Player in the World ==
=== Male ===
Year	Winner	Club
2004	(Brazil) Fernandinho	(Spain) Azkar Lugo
2005	Not assigned	
2006	Not assigned	
2007	(Spain) Jesús Herrero	(Spain) Carnicer Torrejón
2008	(Russia) Dmitri Prudnikov	(Russia) Sinara Yekaterinburg
2009	(Brazil) Thiaguinho	(Brazil) Carlos Barbosa
2010	(Spain) Jesús Aicardo	(Spain) Lobelle de Santiago
2011	(Spain) Sergio Lozano	(Spain) Caja Segovia
2012	(Spain) Álex Yepes	(Spain) ElPozo Murcia
2013	(Brazil) Ferrão	(Russia) Tyumen
2014	(Spain) Adolfo Fernández	(Spain) FS García
2015	(Spain) Adolfo Fernández (2)	(Spain) FS García
2016	(Spain) Adolfo Fernández (3)	(Spain) FS García
2017	(Spain) Fernando Aguilera	(Spain) ElPozo Murcia
2018	(Spain) Fernando Aguilera (2)	(Spain) ElPozo Murcia
2019	(Brazil) Leozinho	(Brazil) Magnus Futsal
2020	(Brazil) Leozinho (2)	(Brazil) Magnus Futsal
2021	(Portugal) Zicky Té	(Portugal) Sporting CP
2022	(Iran) Salar Aghapour	(Iran) Mes Sungun FSC
2023	(Portugal) Lúcio Jr	(Portugal) Benfica
2024	(Ukraine) Rostyslav Semenchenko	(Ukraine) Aurora
2025	(Uruguay) Franco Duque	(Uruguay) Peñarol

=== Female (Pietra Medeiros and Damaris Bermejo Award) ===
Year	Winner	Club
2023	(Spain) Laura Córdoba	(Spain) Futsi Atlético Navalcarnero
2024	(Colombia) Mancilla	(Colombia) Club Deportivo Independiente Cali
2025	(Portugal) Carolina Pedreira	(Spain) Burela FC

== Best Club Coach in the World ==
=== Male ===
Year	Winner	Club
2004	(Spain) Jesús Candelas	(Spain) Inter FS
2005	Not assigned	
2006	Not assigned	
2007	(Brazil) Fernando Ferretti	(Brazil) Jaraguá
2008	(Spain) Jesús Candelas (2)	(Spain) Inter FS
2009	(Brazil) Paulo Mussalem	(Brazil) Carlos Barbosa
2010	(Brazil) Fernando Ferretti (2)	(Brazil) Jaraguá
2011	(Italy) Fulvio Colini	(Italy) Montesilvano
2012	(Spain) Marc Carmona	(Spain) Barcelona
2013	(Spain) Tino Pérez	(Russia) Dinamo Moskva
2014	(Spain) Jesús Velasco Tejada	(Spain) Inter FS
2015	(Spain) Jesús Velasco Tejada (2)	(Spain) Inter FS
2016	(Spain) Jesús Velasco Tejada (3)	(Spain) Inter FS
2017	(Spain) Jesús Velasco Tejada (4)	(Spain) Inter FS
2018	(Spain) Jesús Velasco Tejada (5)	(Spain) Inter FS
2019	(Spain) Andreu Plaza	(Spain) Barcelona
2020	(Spain) Andreu Plaza (2)	(Spain) Barcelona
2021	(Portugal) Nuno Dias	(Portugal) Sporting CP
2022	(Brazil) Cassiano Clein	(Brazil) Cascavel
2023	(Spain) Antonio Vadillo	(Spain) Palma
2024	(Spain) Antonio Vadillo (2)	(Spain) Palma
2025	(Brazil) Xande Melo	(Brazil) Jaraguá

=== Female ===
Year	Winner	Club
2020	(Brazil) Cristiane de Souza	(Brazil) Taboão da Serra
2021	(Spain) Julio Delgado González	(Spain) Burela FS
2022	(Italy) Massimiliano Neri	(Italy) Falconara
2023	(Brazil) Márcio Coelho	(Brazil) Stein Cascavel
2024	(Brazil) Cristiane de Souza (2)	(Brazil) Taboão/Magnus
2025	(Brazil) Cristiane de Souza (3)	(Brazil) Taboão/Magnus

== Best National Team Coach in the World ==
=== Male (Dimitri Nicolaou Award) ===
Year	Winner	National Team
2003	(Spain) Javier Lozano	Spain
2004	(Spain) Javier Lozano (2)	Spain
2005	Not assigned	
2006	Not assigned	
2007	(Spain) José Venancio López	Spain
2008	(Brazil) Paulo César de Oliveira	Brazil
2009	(Iran) Hossein Shams	Iran
2010	(Spain) José Venancio López (2)	Spain
2011	(Brazil) Marcos Sorato	Brazil
2012	(Spain) José Venancio López (3)	Spain
2013	(Brazil) Ney Pereira	Brazil
2014	(Italy) Roberto Menichelli	Italy
2015	(Spain) José Venancio López (4)	Spain
2016	(Argentina) Diego Giustozzi	Argentina
2017	(Spain) José Venancio López (5)	Spain
2018	(Portugal) Jorge Braz	Portugal
2019	(Portugal) Jorge Braz (2)	Portugal
2020	(Portugal) Jorge Braz (3)	Portugal
2021	(Portugal) Jorge Braz (4)	Portugal
2022	(Portugal) Jorge Braz (5)	Portugal
2023	(Morocco) Hicham Dguig	Morocco
2024	(Brazil) Marquinhos Xavier	Brazil
2025	(Brazil) Marquinhos Xavier (2)	Brazil

=== Female ===
Year	Winner	Club
2021	(Spain) Clàudia Pons	Spain
2022	(Spain) Clàudia Pons (2)	Spain
2023	(Brazil) Wilson Sabóia	Brazil
2024	(Brazil) Wilson Sabóia (2)	Brazil
2025	(Brazil) Wilson Sabóia (3)	Brazil

== Best National Team in the World ==
=== Male ===
Year	Winner
2003	Italy
2004	Spain
2005	Not assigned
2006	Not assigned
2007	Brazil
2008	Brazil (2)
2009	Iran
2010	Spain (2)
2011	Brazil (3)
2012	Brazil (4)
2013	Brazil (5)
2014	Brazil (6)
2015	Spain (3)
2016	Argentina
2017	Brazil (7)
2018	Portugal
2019	Brazil (8)
2020	Brazil (9)
2021	Portugal (2)
2022	Portugal (3)
2023	Morocco
2024	Brazil (10)
2025	Brazil (11)

=== Female ===
Year	Winner
2021	Spain
2022	Spain (2)
2023	Brazil
2024	Brazil (2)
2025	Brazil (3)

== Best Club in the World ==
=== Male ===
Year	Winner
2004	(Spain) Inter FS
2005	Not assigned
2006	Not assigned
2007	(Argentina) Club Pinocho
2008	(Brazil) Jaraguá
2009	(Brazil) Carlos Barbosa
2010	(Brazil) Jaraguá (2)
2011	(Italy) Montesilvano
2012	(Spain) Barcelona
2013	(Brazil) Intelli
2014	(Spain) Barcelona (2)
2015	(Spain) Inter FS (2)
2016	(Spain) Inter FS (3)
2017	(Spain) Inter FS (4)
2018	(Spain) Inter FS (5)
2019	(Spain) Barcelona (3)
2020	(Spain) Barcelona (4)
2021	(Portugal) Sporting CP
2022	(Spain) Barcelona (5)
2023	(Spain) Palma
2024	(Spain) Palma (2)
2025	(Brazil) Jaraguá (3)

=== Female ===
Year	Winner
2020	(Spain) Burela FS
2021	(Spain) Burela FS (2)
2022	(Italy) Falconara
2023	(Brazil) Stein Cascavel
2024	(Brazil) Taboão/Magnus
2025	(Brazil) Taboão/Magnus (2)

== Best Referee of the World ==
Year	Winner
2004	(Spain) Pedro Galán Nieto
2005	Not assigned
2006	Not assigned
2007	(Portugal) António Cardoso
2008	(Hungary) Karoly Torok
2009	(Brazil) Michel Jean Bonnaud
2010	(Croatia) Danijel Janosevic
2011	(Turkmenistan) Vadim Baratov
2012	(Spain) Fernando Lumbreras
2013	(Spain) Fernando Lumbreras (2)
2014	(Italy) Alessandro Malfer
2015	(Italy) Alessandro Malfer (2)
2016	(Spain) Fernando Lumbreras (3)
2017	(Croatia) Saša Tomić
2018	(Croatia) Nikola Jelić
2019	(Spain) Cordero Gallardo
2020	(Croatia) Nikola Jelić (2)
2021	(Spain) Cordero Gallardo (2)
2022	(Croatia) Nikola Jelić (3)
2023	(Uruguay) Daniel Fernando Rodriguez Bordon
2024	(Spain) Alejandro Martínez Flores
2025	(Chile) Valeria Nicole Palma

== Notes and references ==
- UMBRO Futsal Awards on futsalplanet.com
- 2014 voting results
