= 2016–17 Primera División Sala (women) =

Primera División Sala
- Season: 2016–17

The 2016–17 season of the Primera División Sala is played by 16 teams.

== Teams ==
Location of teams in Primera División Sala 2016–17
Location of teams in Primera División Sala 2016–17 (Madrid)

Club	Province	Location	Position in 2016-17
Atlético Navalcarnero	(Community of Madrid) Madrid	Navalcarnero	
Alcorcón	(Community of Madrid) Madrid	Alcorcón	
Majadahonda	(Community of Madrid) Madrid	Majadahonda	
Móstoles	(Community of Madrid) Madrid	Móstoles	
Leganés	(Community of Madrid) Madrid	Leganés	
Burela	(Galicia (Spain)) Galicia	Burela	
Ourense	(Galicia (Spain)) Galicia	Ourense	
Poio	(Galicia (Spain)) Galicia	Poio	
Cidade De As Burgas	(Galicia (Spain)) Galicia	Ourense	
Roldán	(Region of Murcia) Murcia	Roldán	
UCAM Murcia	(Region of Murcia) Murcia	Murcia	
Gironella	Catalonia	Gironella	
Rubí	Catalonia	Rubí	
Rioja	La Rioja	Logroño	
Txantrea	Navarre	Pamplona	
Universidad de Alicante	(Valencian Community) Valencia	Alicante	
