= Peque (futsal player) =

Spanish futsal player (born 1987)

Personal information
- Full name: Patricia González Mota
- Date of birth: 3 April 1987 (age 39)
- Place of birth: Madrid, Spain
- Position: Winger

Senior career*
Years	Team	Apps	(Gls)
- Navalafuente FS
2005–2006	Majadahonda FSF		
2006–2011	FSF Rioja Diamante		
2011–2016	CD Burela FS		
2016–2017	Ichussa Sinnai		
2017–2018	FF Cagliari		
2018–2023	CD Burela FS		
2023–2025	AD Alcorcón		
2025	LBTL Alcantarilla		

International career^{‡}
2009–2025	Spain	125	(60)
Medal record
Women's futsal
Representing Spain
UEFA Women's Futsal Championship
Winner	2019 Portugal
Winner	2022 Portugal
Winner	2023 Hungary
- * Club domestic league appearances and goals as of 10 May 2025 ‡ National team caps and goals as of 8 April 2025

Patricia González Mota (born 3 April 1987), commonly known as Peque, is a Spanish former professional futsal player who played as a winger. Considered one of the best futsal players of her generation, she played most of her career at Burela, being the greatest figure in the history of the club, with which she won five Primera División titles, the Copa de la Reina six times and Supercopa de España five times.

An international from 2009 to 2025, Peque has played more than a hundred matches with the Spain women's national team, of which she was captain. She won three editions of the UEFA Women's Futsal Championship, in 2019, 2022 and 2023, being elected best player of the tournament in the latter.

== Club career ==
Peque began playing futsal at Navalafuente in his hometown, then moved on to Majadahonda and FSF Rioja, where she played for five years (2006–2011). For the 2011/12 season, she signed for Burela, where she played until 2016. During that time, she participated in the conquest of the first two First Division leagues in the history of the Galician team, in the 2012/13 and 2015/16 seasons, titles to which she added a Copa de la Reina and a Supercopa. She was also the league's top scorer in the 2013/14 season, with 40 goals.

Peque then played for two years in Italy, in the ranks of Sinnai and Cagliari, before returning to Burela in 2018. In her second stint at the Mariña de Lugo club, she became the captain and a fundamental piece of a team that almost completely dominated Spanish futsal, winning three leagues, five Copas de la Reina and four Supercopas. She was also named the second best player in the world at the Futsal Awards two consecutive years, in 2020 and 2021, both times behind Amandinha.

== International career ==
Peque made her debut for the Spanish national team on 28 March 2009, in a friendly match against the Netherlands. She returned to the national team in 2012 to play in the World Tournament and has since been a regular for the national team, with whom she played in four editions of the world tournament. In 2018, she contributed to the qualification for the first Women's Futsal Euro, held the following year in Portugal, which she ended up winning. She repeated the title in the 2022 and 2023 editions, being elected the best player of the tournament in the latter. In addition, in the semi-finals against Portugal, she played her 100th match with the national team.

Peque retired before the inaugural FIFA Futsal Women's World Cup due to injury.

== Honours ==
Burela

- Primera División: 2012–13, 2015–16, 2019–20, 2020–21, 2022–23
- Copa de España: 2013, 2019, 2020, 2021, 2022, 2023
- Supercopa de España: 2015, 2019, 2020, 2021
- Futsal Women's European Champions: 2021
- Recopa: 2019

Spain

- UEFA Women's Futsal Championship: 2019, 2022, 2023

Individual

- Futsal Awards Best Female Player in the World: 2022
