= List of Iran national futsal team managers =

== Coaches ==
As of 17 March 2022

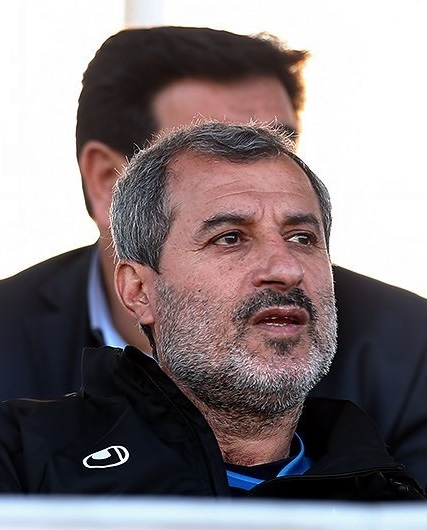
Mohammad Mayeli Kohan, was the first manager of Iran from 1992 to 1994

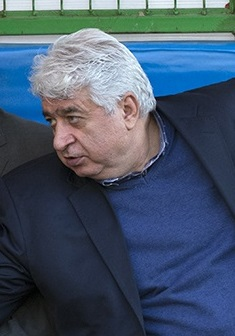
Hossein Shams, managed Iran from 1998 to 2000 and 2006 to 2011

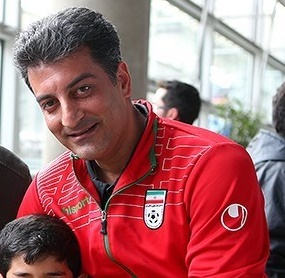
Ali Sanei, managed Iran from 2011 to 2012

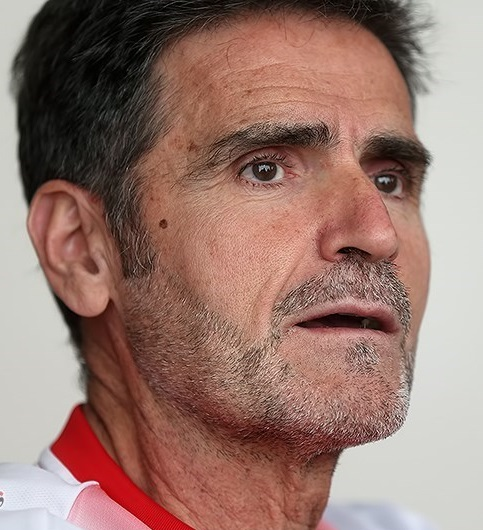
Jesús Candelas, managed Iran from 2013 to 2015

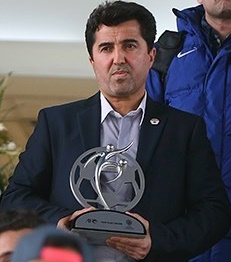
Mohammad Nazemasharieh, managed Iran from 2015 to 2022

#	Name	Nat	Period			Result					Honours
#	Name	Nat	from	until	days	Pld	W	D*	L	Win %	Honours
1	Mohammad Mayeli Kohan	Iran	1992	1994		10	7	0	3	70%	FIFA Futsal World Championship: 1992 Fourth-Place
2	Farhad Kazemi	Iran	1995	1995		1	1	0	0	100%	
3	Mansour Pourheidari	Iran	1996	1997		8	6	0	2	75.00%	FIFA Futsal World Championship: 1996 Group Stage
4	Saeid Akhoundi	Iran	1997	1997		4	2	0	2	50.00%	
5	Hossein Shams	Iran	1998	2000	1 year, ?? days	25	16	1	8	64%	AFC Futsal Championship: 1999 Champion, 2000 Champion; FIFA Futsal World Championship: 2000 Group Stage
6	Victor Hermans	Netherlands	2001	2001		7	7	0	0	100%	AFC Futsal Championship: 2001 Champion
7	Mohammad Hassan Ansarifard	Iran	2001	2004		47	29	5	13	61.70%	AFC Futsal Championship: 2002 Champion, 2003 Champion, 2004 Champion; FIFA Futsal World Championship: 2004 Group Stage
8	Jurandir Dutra de Azevedo	Brazil	2004	2006		16	13	1	2	81.25%	AFC Futsal Championship: 2005 Champion, 2006 Third-Place; Asian Indoor and Martial Arts Games: 2005 Champion
9	Hossein Shams	Iran	8 August 2006	17 May 2011	4 years, 282 days	95	61	13	21	64.21%	AFC Futsal Championship: 2007 Champion, 2008 Champion, 2010 Champion; Grand Prix de Futsal: 2007 Runner-up, 2009 Runner-up, 2010 Fourth-Place; Futsal Confederations Cup: 2009 Champion; FIFA Futsal World Championship: 2008 Second Round
10	Ali Sanei	Iran	25 May 2011	21 November 2012	1 year, 180 days	38	22	8	8	57.89%	AFC Futsal Championship: 2012 Third-Place; FIFA Futsal World Cup: 2012 Round of 16; Grand Prix de Futsal: 2011 Fourth-Place; WAFF Futsal Championship: 2012 Champion
11	Jesús Candelas	Spain	21 January 2013	20 March 2015	2 years, 58 days	39	29	7	3	74.36%	AFC Futsal Championship: 2014 Runner-up; Grand Prix de Futsal: 2014 Third-Place, 2013 Third-Place; Asian Indoor and Martial Arts Games: 2013 Champion
12	Mohammad Nazemasharieh	Iran	15 September 2015	12 January 2022	6 years, 129 days	77	54	13	10	70%	FIFA Futsal World Cup: 2016 Third-Place; Grand Prix de Futsal: 2015 Runner-up; AFC Futsal Championship: 2016 Champion, 2018 Champion; Asian Indoor and Martial Arts Games: 2017 Champion
13	Vahid Shamsaei	Iran	12 January 2022	Now	3 years, 57 days	0	0	0	0	0	
Total			2 May 1992	Now	32 years, 322 days	364	244	48	72	67.03%	

*Denotes draws includes knockout matches decided on penalty shootouts.
