= 2016–17 Serie A Elite =

Serie A Elite
- Season: 2016–17

The 2016–17 season of the Serie A Elite is played by 17 Italian women's futsal teams.

== Teams ==
Location of teams in Serie A Elite 2016–17

| Club | Province | Location | Position in 2016–17 |
|---|---|---|---|
| Arcadia | Apulia | Bisceglie | |
| Real Statte | Apulia | Montemesola | |
| Stone Five Fasano | Apulia | Fasano | |
| Bellator Ferentum | Lazio | Frosinone | |
| Lazio | Lazio | Fiano Romano | |
| Olimpus Roma | Lazio | Rome | |
| Sporting Locri | Calabria | Sant'Andrea Apostolo dello Ionio | |
| Napoli | Campania | Marigliano | |
| Città di Montesilvano | Abruzzo | Montesilvano | |
| Pescara | Abruzzo | Pescara | |
| Città di Falconara | Marche | Falconara Marittima | |
| Cagliari | Sardinia | Sinnai | |
| Sinnai | Sardinia | Sinnai | |
| Ternana | Umbria | Terni | |
| Kick Off | Lombardy | San Donato Milanese | |
| Thienese | Veneto | Thiene | |
| Breganze | Veneto | Sarcedo | |
