= Giovanni Franken =

Dutch footballer

Personal information
- Full name: Giovanni Francesco Zacharias Franken
- Date of birth: 14 November 1977 (age 48)
- Place of birth: Rotterdam, Netherlands
- Position: Midfielder

Team information
- Current team: Curaçao (assistant coach)

Youth career
- Feyenoord

Senior career*
Years	Team	Apps	(Gls)
- DOTO
1998–1999	Dordrecht	8	(0)
1999	VVM		
1999–2002	RKC	8	(0)
2002–2006	DOTO		
2006–2007	Barendrecht		
2007–2011	RVVH		

International career
2004–2008	Netherlands Antilles	8	(0)

Managerial career
- 2013–2018: RVVH
- 2013–2015: Aruba
- 2018–2019: Achilles Veen
- 2019: FC IJsselmonde
- 2022: ADO Den Haag (caretaker)
- 2024: Curaçao (asst.)
- 2025: Shaanxi Union
- 2026: Curaçao (asst.)
- * Club domestic league appearances and goals

Giovanni Franken

Giovanni Francesco Zacharias Franken (born 14 November 1977) is a professional football coach and former player who is assistant coach of the Curaçao national team. Born in the Netherlands, Franken represented the Netherlands Antilles at international level.

He was the head coach of the Aruba national football team between 2013 and 2015.

== Club career ==
Born in Rotterdam, Franken played club football for Feyenoord, DOTO, Dordrecht, VVM, RKC Waalwijk, BVV Barendrecht and RVVH. He moved from DOTO, where he was captain, to BVV Barendrecht in May 2006. He signed for RVVH in February 2007.

== International career ==
Franken represented Netherlands Antilles at international level, earning eight caps between 2004 and 2008, which included seven games in FIFA World Cup qualifying matches.

== Coaching career ==
In the 2010–11 season, Franken was in charge of RVVH's women's team, while still playing for the club's first team. After a season, he gained promotion to the best women league in the Netherlands. At the end of the 2010–11 season, he also retired as an active player. Ahead of the 2011–12 season, he took charge of RVVH's reserve team

From 2013 to 2018, Franken was in charge of RVVH's first team. In October 2013 he was also appointed manager of the Aruba national football team, combining it with his coaching position at RVVH. He left this position in August 2015.

On 4 January 2018, it was announced that Franken would take charge of Achilles Veen from the 2018–19 season. After seven months, Franken left the club by mutual agreement on 25 January 2019.

On 20 February, Franken was appointed interim manager of FC IJsselmonde for the rest of the season. In June 2015, Franken joined ADO Den Haag as manager for the U15 squad. In the 2020–21 season, he took charge of the U18 squad. In June 2021, it was confirmed that Franken had been promoted to the first team staff as assistant coach to ADO manager Ruud Brood. In March 2022, he took over as caretaker manager after Brood had been dismissed, almost leading the club to promotion in the play-offs. From the 2022–23 season, Franken was put in charge of ADO's under-21 team.

On 11 March 2025, Franken was appointed as the head coach of China League One club Shaanxi Union. On 8 November 2025, the club announced that Franken has left his position after the 2025 season. He was an assistant to Dick Advocaat at Curaçao in 2026.
