= Hoofdklasse (disambiguation) =

The Hoofdklasse (Dutch, 'head class') is the second-highest league of amateur football in the Netherlands, and the fifth tier in general.

Hoofdklasse may also refer to:

== Netherlands ==
- Hoofdklasse (women), the second highest league of amateur women's football
- Men's Hoofdklasse Hockey, the men's top division of field hockey
- Women's Hoofdklasse Hockey, the women's top division of field hockey
- Hoofdklasse (cricket), the second highest domestic cricket competition
- Hoofdklasse (korfball), the second highest echelon of korfball
- Honkbal Hoofdklasse, the highest level of professional baseball
- Futsal Hoofdklasse (women), the second level women's futsal league

== Suriname ==
- SVB Hoofdklasse, the second division of Surinamese football
