= Bağcı =

Bağcı (pronounced [ˈbaːdʒɯ]) is a Turkish surname. Notable people with the surname include:

- Barış Bağcı (born 1975), Turkish actor
- Dilara Bağcı (born 1994), Turkish volleyball player
- Leyla Bağcı (born 1990), Turkish-Dutch female footballer
