= Higuita =

Higuita is a surname. Notable people with the surname include:

- Cristian Higuita (born 1994), Colombian footballer
- Leo Higuita (born 1986 as Leonardo de Melo Vieira Leite), Kazakhstani futsal player
- René Higuita (born 1966), Colombian footballer
- Sergio Higuita (born 1997), Colombian cyclist
