= 2007–08 Eerste Klasse =

Eerste Klasse
- Season: 2007–8
- Relegated: 2008–09 Tweede Klasse

2007–08 Eerste Klasse was a Dutch association football season of the Eerste Klasse.

Saturday champions were:

- A: RKAV Volendam
- B: SVV Scheveningen
- C: VV Heerjansdam
- D: SDC Putten
- E: Harkemase Boys

Sunday champions were:

- A: FC Hilversum
- B: HBS Craeyenhout
- C: TSV Longa
- D: SV Venray
- E: VV Germania
- F: SC Joure
