= Nikki de Roest =

Dutch educator and former footballer

Personal information
- Date of birth: 2 April 1993 (age 33)
- Place of birth: Heerjansdam, Netherlands
- Position: Midfielder

Youth career
- VV Heerjansdam

Senior career*
Years	Team	Apps	(Gls)
2010	ASWH		
2011	VV Heerjansdam		
2012–2013	PSV	7	(0)
2013–2018	VV Heerjansdam		
2018–2019	TPP Rotterdam		
2019–202?	Feyenoord Futsal		

International career
2009	Netherlands U-16 WNT	3	
2009–2010	Netherlands U-17 WNT	8	(0)
- * Club domestic league appearances and goals

Nikki de Roest (Heerjansdam, 4 April 1993) is a Dutch educator and a former association football player, who played professionally in 2012–2013 season for PSV/FC Eindhoven. She played internationally for the Netherlands in young soccer selections. De Roest plays as a midfielder. She later played futsal.

== Football career ==
De Roest played initially played on boys teams of VV Heerjansdam and from 2010 at ASWH. From 2011 she started playing on women's teams, initially one year at the Ridderkerk-side RVVH in the Hoofdklasse.

=== Dutch International teams ===
In 2009 De Roest played in Netherlands U–16, gaining 3 caps in total. In 2009-2010 she continued her international career in Netherlands U–17, where she had 8 caps.

=== BeNe League with PSV/FC Eindhoven ===
In 2012 De Roest transferred to the newly established women's team PSV/FC Eindhoven, playing in the BeNe League. On 24 Augustus 2012 she played her first game (from the 85th minute) for PSV/FC Eindhoven playing in The Hague against ADO Den Haag. This was also the team's first game.

In February 2013 De Roest and her team lost in the eighth finals of the National Cup, against SC Buitenveldert. De Roest had played 69 minutes in this game.

=== Hoofdklasse and Topklasse with RVVH ===
De Roest returned to RVVH Ridderkerk in the summer of 2013 due to the lack of the playing time at PSV/FC Eindhoven.

In April 2015, she scored the finishing touch in a 4–0 victory against CVV Zwervers. On 25 October she headed a decisive goal in against VIOD Driesum, bringing her team to lead the Hoofdklasse. In June 2016 De Roest played very strong but did not score, when RVVH beat FC Eindhoven 4–3.

In December 2016 De Roest scored RVVH's sole victory goal (1–0) in the 8th finals of the Dutch National Cup, once more against VIOD Driesum. In May 2017 she missed out on a chance to score against SSS Klaaswaal. In June 2018, De Roest scored three out of six goals in the decisive game against RCL, bringing RVVH back to the Topklasse. In September 2018, after starting the new season at RVVH, Nikki decided to immediately end her field football player career.

=== TPP Rotterdam and Feyenoord Futsal ===
Since 2018, De Roest plays in the first tier futsal league Topdivisie, including the playoffs, for TPP Rotterdam (the women's team was VV Pernis the season before). Her team won the national championship in 2019, then became Feyenoord Futsal.
