= PC de Oliveira =

Brazilian footballer

Personal information
- Full name: Paulo César de Oliveira
- Date of birth: 6 September 1960 (age 66)
- Place of birth: Araraquara, Brazil
- Positions: Midfielder; Defender (futsal)

Youth career
- Ferroviária

Senior career*
Years	Team	Apps	(Gls)
1977–1985	Ferroviária		
1985	Gercan (futsal)		
1985–1987	Grêmio (futsal)		
1988	Itaqui (futsal)		
1989	Enxuta (futsal)		
1990	Perdigão (futsal)		

International career
1979	Brazil U20		

Managerial career
- 1994: Itaqui (futsal)
- 1995: Russo Preto (futsal)
- 1996–1997: Internacional (futsal)
- 1998–2003: Ulbra (futsal)
- 2004–2005: Playas de Castellón (futsal)
- 2005–2009: Brazil (futsal)
- 2009–2012: Corinthians (futsal)
- 2013–2014: Copagril (futsal)
- 2015: Brasil Kirin (futsal)
- 2016: Ferroviária (football coordinator)
- 2017: Brazil (futsal)
- 2017–2018: Ferroviária
- 2019–2020: Aimoré
- 2021–2022: São Paulo U20 (assistant)
- 2023: Avaí (assistant)
- 2024–: Internacional (futsal coordinator)
- * Club domestic league appearances and goals as of 2 March 2024

Paulo César de Oliveira (born 6 September 1960), better known as PC de Oliveira, is a Brazilian former professional footballer, futsal player and manager.

== Playing career ==
Paulo César de Oliveira began his career as a field player at Ferroviária, where he played from 1977 to 1985. At the age of 24, he became a futsal player, playing especially for teams from Rio Grande do Sul such as Grêmio FBPA. He ended his career in 1990.

== Managerial career ==
PC began his coaching career in 1994 at Itaqui, and in 1996 he was intercontinental futsal champion with SC Internacional, against FC Barcelona. He also managed to repeat the feat with Ulbra Canoas in 1999, later coaching the Spanish team Playas de Castellón. In 2005 he was invited to be coach of the Brazil national futsal team. He was multi-champion for Brazil, with emphasis on the 2008 FIFA Futsal World Cup. He remained with the national team until 2009 and later coached Corinthians, Copagrill and Brasil-Kirin. In 2016 he returned to Ferroviária, this time occupying the position of football coordinator, but at the end of the year he was invited again to coach the Brazilian team, which was going through a time of crisis.

After winning the 2017 Copa América de Futsal, PC took over the Ferroviária field team that was facing the fight against relegation in the Campeonato Paulista. After managing to stay, he continued at the club for the Copa Paulista, where he was champion. He would still come to coach CE Aimoré later, but was unsuccessful, being fired after a sequence of defeats in the 2020 Campeonato Gaúcho. In 2021, he became an assistant to Alexsandro de Souza (Alex), who will begin his coaching career with São Paulo FC's U20 team. He remained with Alex in his next job, at Avaí FC in 2023.

For 2024, PC de Oliveira was announced as SC Internacional futsal coordinator.

== Honours ==
=== Futsal manager ===
Internacional

- Liga Nacional de Futsal: 1996
- Intercontinental Futsal Cup: 1996

Ulbra Canoas

- Intercontinental Futsal Cup: 1999
- Liga Nacional Futsal: 1998, 2002, 2003
- Campeonato Gaúcho de Futsal: 2001, 2003

Corinthians

- Taça Brasil de Futsal: 2010
- Liga Paulista de Futsal: 2009

Brazil

- FIFA Futsal World Cup: 2008
- Copa América de Futsal: 2008, 2017
- Pan American Games: 2007
- Lusofonia Games: 2006
- South American Games: 2006
- Grand Prix de Futsal: 2005, 2006, 2007, 2008

Individual

- Dimitri Nicolaou Award: 2008

=== Football manager ===
Ferroviária

- Copa Paulista: 2017
