= Glenn Helder =

Dutch footballer (born 1968)

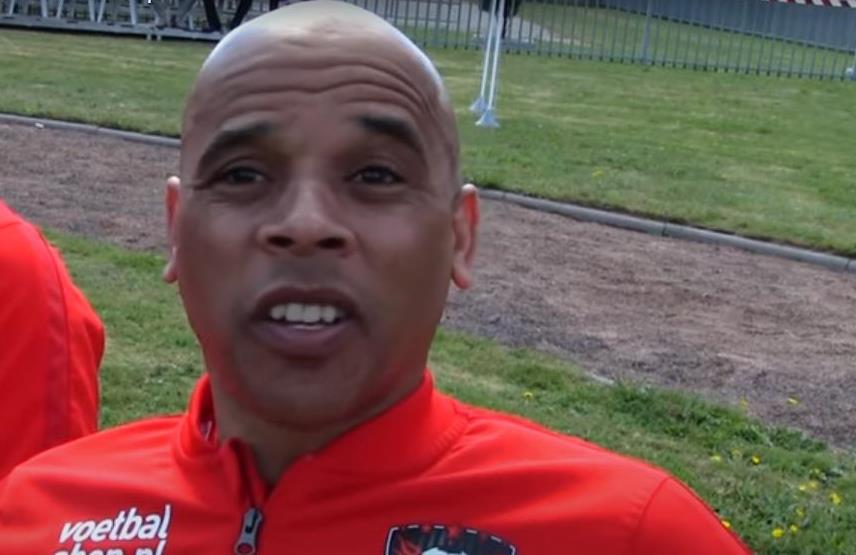

Personal information
- Full name: Glenn Helder
- Date of birth: 28 October 1968 (age 58)
- Place of birth: Leiden, Netherlands
- Height: 1.74 m (5 ft 8 1/2 in)
- Position: Winger

Youth career
- 1974-1975: Oranje Groen
- 1975-1982: UVS
- 1982-1985: Ajax
- 1985: UVS
- 1986-1989: Roodenburg

Senior career*
Years	Team	Apps	(Gls)
1989–1993	Sparta	93	(9)
1993–1995	Vitesse	52	(12)
1995–1997	Arsenal	39	(1)
1996	→ Benfica (loan)	11	(1)
1997–1998	NAC	3	(0)
1998	Dalian Wanda	0	(0)
1998–1999	NAC	3	(1)
1999–2000	MTK Budapest	3	(1)
2000–2002	RBC	0	(0)
2002–2003	TOP Oss	10	(1)
2009–2010	DOTO	3	(0)
Total		223	(25)

International career
1995	Netherlands	4	(0)
- * Club domestic league appearances and goals

Glenn Helder (born 28 October 1968) is a Dutch retired footballer who played as a winger.

He notably played in the Premier League for Arsenal, in the Eredivisie for Sparta Rotterdam, Vitesse Arnhem and NAC Breda. He also played in Portugal for Benfica, in China with Dalian Wanda and in Hungary with MTK Budapest before finishing his career back in the Netherlands with RBC Roosendaal, TOP Oss and DOTO. He was capped four times by the Netherlands.

Since retirement, he has been a professional Poker player, musician, welder and stand-up comedian.

== Playing career ==
Born in Leiden, Helder played for local amateur sides Oranje Groen, UVS and Roodenburg before playing in the Eredivisie for Sparta Rotterdam and Vitesse Arnhem. He joined Premier League side Arsenal on 14 February 1995 and made his debut for the club in a 1–0 home win against Nottingham Forest on 21 February 1995. Helder was the final signing made by Arsenal's then manager George Graham, who left a week after Helder's arrival. Helder made 27 league appearances for Arsenal, plus 12 as a substitute, and scored a solo goal for the club in a 3–2 win over Middlesbrough. In late 1996, just after the appointment of Arsène Wenger as manager, Arsenal sent Helder on loan to Benfica where he sustained a serious injury. On his return, Helder found that he had been replaced by Marc Overmars, who signed for Arsenal in the summer of 1997. Helder was unable to break back into the first team.

Helder then moved to NAC Breda in his native Netherlands and, after a short spell there, he went to play in China for Dalian Wanda FC. Soon afterwards he returned to Breda for a second spell at the club before moving on to MTK Hungária FC of Hungary. He then returned home to trial with FC Dordrecht, which proved to be unfruitful. Helder eventually signed for RBC Roosendaal in 2000 and two years later moved to TOP Oss. He retired one year later. In July 2006, Helder made a surprise appearance for Arsenal in Dennis Bergkamp's final game, a testimonial against Ajax. Helder appears regularly in Masters footballing tournaments and soccer clinics.

== International career ==
In his Dutch international footballing career, Helder earned four caps altogether for the Oranje.

== Personal life ==
In a 1999 interview, Helder stated that during his stay at NAC he tried to commit suicide because of problems resulting from compulsive gambling. However, he continues to gamble, and is sometimes seen playing poker on the English Five television station, representing the Netherlands, most notably in the PartyPoker.com Football & Poker Legends Cup.

In 2008, Helder was sentenced to 373 days in jail for stalking his ex-girlfriend, assault and illegal possession of a weapon.

After his retirement from professional football, Helder took up music, gaining recognition as a percussionist. He also became a stand up comedian.
