= Città di Montesilvano =

- Full name: Città di Montesilvano
- Founded: 1984
- Chairman: Antonio Iervolino
- League: Serie A Elite
- Website: https://www.cittadimontesilvanoc5.com/

Città di Montesilvano is a Serie A Elite women's futsal club based in Montesilvano, Italy.

== History ==
They won the Italian championship in the 2015–16 season.

In 2017, the team will participate in the European Women's Futsal Tournament together with the champions from Spain, Portugal, Russia, Ukraine and the Netherlands.

== Current squad ==
As of 9 April 2017

Note: Flags indicate national team as defined under FIFA eligibility rules; some limited exceptions apply. Players may hold more than one non-FIFA nationality.

No.	Pos.	Nation	Player
1	GK	(Brazil) BRA	Ana Carolina Sestari
6	DF	(Italy) ITA	Barbara Silvetti
7	DF	(Spain) ESP	Maria Amparo
8	DF	(Portugal) POR	Filipa Mendes
10	DF	(Italy) ITA	Serena Sergi
11	FW	(Italy) ITA	Jessica Troiano
12	FW	(Brazil) BRA	Bruna Borges
13	DF	(Italy) ITA	Cecilia Nobilio

No.	Pos.	Nation	Player
14	DF	(Spain) ESP	Eva Ortega
15	FW	(Brazil) BRA	Eliane Dalla Villa
17	DF	(Italy) ITA	Alessia Guidotti
20	DF	(Italy) ITA	Consuelo D'Intino
21	FW	(Italy) ITA	Susanna Nicoletti
23	GK	(Italy) ITA	Samira Ghanfili
25	FW	(Italy) ITA	Giulia Domenichetti
27	GK	(Italy) ITA	Laura Esposito
