= RVVH =

Dutch football club

RVV Hercules
- Full name: Ridderkerkse Voetbal Vereniging Hercules
- Nickname: RVVH
- Founded: 10 August 1918
- Ground: Sportpark Ridderkerk; Ridderkerk
- Capacity: 3,000
- Chairman: Mario Papavoine
- Manager: Kevin Vink
- League: Vierde Divisie B (2023–24)
Home colours	Away colours

Ridderkerkse Voetbal Vereniging Hercules, known as RVVH is a Dutch football club, based in Ridderkerk. Since 2023, its main male squad competes in the Vierde Divisie.

RVVH has a highly successful women's squad. It played most years in the Topklasse since this league was started, including when the Topklasse was the top tier of Dutch women soccer. Former women players of RVVH, including in the youth, include Leyla Bağcı, Jeanine van Dalen, Manon Melis, and Nikki de Roest.

== Head coach ==
- J. de Bruin (in the 1940s and 1950s)
- Arie van der Graaf ?–1963
- C.? Molenveld 1963–1966
- Henk den Boer, 1966–1969
- Daan den Bleijker, 1969–1970
- Joop Herwig, 1970–1971
- Cor van der Gijp, 1971–1972
- Gerard Weber, 1972–1976
- Ad van Dongen, 1976–1979
- Ton de Hoop, 1979–1982
- Hans van der Wekke, 1982–1983
- Gerrie Ter Horst, 1983–1985
- John Huegenin, 1985–1987
- Ronald Klinkerberg, 1997–2001
- Ruud Heus, 2004–2006
- Jan Everse, 2009–2010
- Theo de Boon, 2010–2103
- Giovanni Franken, 2013–2018
- Ronald Hulsbosch, 2018–2020
- Kevin Vink, 2020–2024
- Jan van der Lugt, 2024–
