= Jeanine van Dalen =

Dutch footballer

Personal information
- Full name: Jeanine van Dalen
- Date of birth: 18 June 1986 (age 40)
- Place of birth: Rotterdam
- Position: Defender

Youth career
- RVVH

Senior career*
Years	Team	Apps	(Gls)
2007–2012	ADO Den Haag		

International career
2005–2010	Netherlands	10	(0)
- * Club domestic league appearances and goals

Jeanine van Dalen (born 18 June 1986) is a Dutch former footballer, who played as a defender. She has previously played for ADO Den Haag and for the Netherlands national team.

== Club career ==
In 2007, Van Dalen moved from RVVH to ADO Den Haag in the newly formed Women's Eredivisie. She played for ADO Den Haag until 2012, winning the Double in the 2011–12 season.

== International career ==
Van Dalen made her debut for the national team on 20 August 2005, in a 4–0 friendly defeat against Finland.

She was part of the Netherlands squad at the UEFA Women's Euro 2009, but made no appearances during the tournament.

== Honours ==
=== Club ===
ADO Den Haag

- Women's Eredivisie: 2011–12
- KNVB Women's Cup: 2011–12

=== Individual ===
- Women's Eredivisie Golden Shoe: 2008–09 (with Sheila van den Bulk)
