= 2016–17 Futsal Eredivisie (women) =

Eredivisie
- Season: 2016–17

The 2016–17 season of the Eredivisie is played by 11 teams. They play a regular season, which is followed by championship play-offs. Os Lusitanos pulled out before the season started due to lack of representative players. Team Alkmaar took over all teams of Dansschool Biersteker, with that they secured their place in the Eredivisie. Since Os Lusitanos pulled out there is no team relegated to the Hoofdklasse.

== Teams ==
Location of teams in Eredivisie 2016–17

Club	Province	Location	Position in 2016-17
Avanti	Friesland	Stiens	
Drachtster Boys	Friesland	Drachten	
Drs. Vijfje	(Groningen (province)) Groningen	Groningen	
Nieuw Roden	(Groningen (province)) Groningen	Leek	
Hovocubo	North Holland	Zwaag	
Team Alkmaar	North Holland	Alkmaar	
Reiger Boys	North Holland	Heerhugowaard	
Zuidoost United	North Holland	Amsterdam	
Pernis	South Holland	Schiedam	
PFC	Gelderland	Apeldoorn	
Gelre	Gelderland	Wehl	
