= Leyla Bağcı =

Turkish-Dutch footballer (born 1990)

Personal information
- Full name: Leyla Firdevs Bağcı
- Date of birth: 6 February 1990 (age 36)
- Place of birth: Dordrecht, Netherlands
- Position: Goalkeeper

Youth career
- 2000–2010: FC Dordrecht (DFC)

Senior career*
Years	Team	Apps	(Gls)
2010–2011	Willem II		
2011	RVVH Ridderkerk		
2011–2012	Standard Fémina de Liège		
2012–2013	SteDoCo		
2013–2014	Antwerp FC Ladies	13	(0)

International career^{‡}
2011–2012	Turkey	4	(0)
- * Club domestic league appearances and goals ‡ National team caps and goals as of 31 March 2012

Leyla Firdevs Bağcı (born 6 February 1990) is a Turkish-Dutch women's football goalkeeper. She played in the Netherlands and Belgium, and was part of the Turkey women's national team.

== Early years ==
Leyla Firdevs Bağcı was born to Turkish immigrant parents in Dordrecht on 6 February 1990. She grew up together with her six-year younger sister in her hometown, an island with rich history, where she still lives.

She began football playing at the age of seven with boys on the street. She tried swimming and taekwondo before she and her father finally opted for football. Her mother advised her spouse that football playing would be best for Leya because she found Leyla's skills and technique insufficient for martial arts. She was supported in her passion especially by her father Sabri Kenan Bağcı, the president of the "Turkish Sports Clubs Federation in the Netherlands" (Turkish: Hollanda Türk Spor Kulüpleri Federasyonu) (HTSKF) and the "Federation of People from Yozgat in the Netherlands" (Turkish: Hollanda Yozgatlilar Federasyonu), who played football at regional level in his youth in his hometown Yozgat, Turkey. He took her by the hand and got her registered in a local football club.

== Playing career ==
Leyla Bağcı was admitted to the mixed-gender children's team of the FC Dordrecht (DFC) at the age of ten. She was chosen to play in the goalkeeper position as she was taller than her boy peers in the team. She was selected to play in the mixed team at regional level when she was fifteen years old, and at age seventeen she appeared in the mixed-gender Western Holland regional team.

=== Club ===
Willem II

Bağcı transferred to the Tilburg-based Willem II, which competed in the Dutch Women's Eredivisie. She trained about half an hour almost every day without missing a training session although she was a substitute from the first day on. She played for SC 't Zand in the same city, which were in cooperation with Willem II. Due to financial reasons, the women's football section of Willem II was closed.

RVVH Ridderkerk

After the closure of Willem II, Bağcı consciously joined RVVH in Ridderkerk, where she remained sitting on the reserve bench. She continued to take part at the training.

Standard Fémina de Liège

In January 2012, she transferred to the Belgian club Standard Fémina de Liège competing in the Super League Vrouwenvoetbal, becoming their first goalkeeper.

SteDoCo

In June 2012, she returned to the Netherlands, and joined SteDoCo from Hoornaar.

Royal Antwerp F.C.

In July 2013, she went again to Belgium to play for Antwerp FC Ladies, a newcomer to the BeNe League.

=== International ===
When Leyla Bağcı was eighteen years old, she was called up to the Netherlands women's national under-19 team for qualification. After the training session, she told to the selective and technical staff that although born and raised in the Netherlands, she has her heart go out to the Turkey women's national team. Her preference was welcomed by the Dutch responsible people.

In 2010, she was called up to the Turkey women's national football team camp at the age of twenty. She was not admitted to the team because unfit.

The next year, Bağcı was offered a substitute goalkeeper place in the Turkey women's national team to participate at the UEFA Women's Euro 2013 qualifying – Group 2 matches. In the match against Kazakhstan on 22 October 2011, she had to remain seated on the reserve bench. She debuted in the away match against Romania on 27 October 2011, entering the game in the 82nd minute to replace Fatma Şahin. She played as the first goalkeeper in the home match against Romania on 23 November 2011. She defended the goal of Turkey in the match against Germany on 15 February 2012, and against Switzerland on 31 March 2012.

In August 2013, Bağcı was named for the national team's participation at the 2015 FIFA Women's World Cup qualification – UEFA Group 6. However, she stood away due to her intensive preparatory training sessions at her new club Antwerp FC Ladies in Belgium.

== Private life ==
Bağcı holds a diploma in sports massage and a tcoaching certificate (TC3) in Sport and Movement from the Albeda College in Rotterdam.

She started a training for police officer career in Amsterdam. However, she broke off her decision after she received a call from the Belgian club Royal Antwerp F.C.

She appeared on the football club's calendar of Royal Antwerp F.C. as a cover girl.
