= Serie A Elite =

- Country: Italy
- Confederation: UEFA
- Number of clubs: 17
- Level on pyramid: 1
- Current: 2016–17

The Serie A Elite is the premier women's futsal league in Italy, organized by the Italian Football Federation.The competition, which is played under UEFA rules, currently consists of 17 teams.
