= Futsal Eredivisie (women) =

Eredivisie
- Country: Netherlands
- Confederation: UEFA
- Number of clubs: 11
- Level on pyramid: 1
- Website: https://www.eredivisie-zaalvoetbal.nl
- Current: 2016–17

The Eredivisie is the premier women's futsal league in the Netherlands, organized by the Royal Dutch Football Association. The competition, which is played under UEFA rules, currently consists of 11 teams.
