= VV Pernis =

Dutch football club

- Full name: Voetbalvereniging Pernis
- Founded: 1929; 2011
- Chairman: Jaco Hoekman
- League: Futsal Eredivisie (women); Vierde Klasse; Vierde Klasse (women)
- Website: https://www.vvpernis.nl/
Home colours

Voetbalvereniging Pernis is a Dutch football club in Pernis, Rotterdam that emerged in 2011 from a technical merger between DOTO (founded 1933) and Excelsior Pernis (founded 1929). Its women's futsal team, that won the national championship in 2016, plays in nearby Schiedam.

VV Pernis has three first squads; the women's futsal team plays in the Eredivisie. Both the men and women association football first squads play in their gender-specific Vierde Klasse. The male second squad plays in the Reserve Derde Klasse.

== History ==
=== 1929–2011: Excelsior Pernis ===
Excelsior Pernis was founded on 19 September 1929 as a merger of Volharding (founded 1925) and De Zwervers (founded 1926). It peaked in 1990–91 and again in 1996–99 when it played in the Eerste Klasse,

=== 1933–2011: Door Ontwikkeling Tot Ontspanning ===
DOTO
- Full name: Door Ontwikkeling Tot Ontspanning
- Nickname(s): DOTO
- Founded: 26 July 1933
- Dissolved: 1 July 2011
Home colours	Away colours

Door Ontwikkeling Tot Ontspanning (DOTO) was founded on July 26, 1933. It peaked in 2005–10 when it played in the Hoofdklasse. A year later it merged into Excelsior Pernis to become VV Pernis. Glenn Helder played for DOTO starting in 2009.

=== 2011–2014: VV Pernis merger and grounds change ===
At the 2011 merger, they continued under the new name vv Pernis. The combined club kept the official foundation date of Excelsior, 19 September 1929. The irregular "merger" also meant that the combined VV Pernis continued at the highest league of parent DOTO.

VV Pernis played in the first merger year at Sportpark De Madroel, former home of Excelsior Pernis. Since January 2013, VV Pernis has moved to the former complex of DOTO and the members chose a new name for the sports park: Sportpark Pernis.

=== 2014–2019: National championships women's futsal ===
In 2015, the male first squad relegated to the Derde Klasse and in 2019 to the Vierde Klasse.

The Women's futsal team of VV Pernis plays in Schiedam and made history when, in season 2015–16, it won the Eredivisie championship. In 2017 the team participated in the European Women's Futsal Tournament along with the champions from Spain, Portugal, Russia, Ukraine and Italy.

In 2018 the Women's Futsal Team won the national championship again, beating the women of Drachtster Boys after an extension, 1–2. It lost after the extension of the Cup finals to KTP Nieuw Roden, 2–3. In the summer of 2018 the Pernis women became then female futsal branch of TPP Rotterdam, who won another national championship in 2019. Right after, TPP Rotterdam became the futsal branch of Feyenoord and won the Supercup. Nikki de Roest is among the team's players since 2018.

=== Since 2019: Vierde Klasse football ===
The 2019–20 season was broken off due to the COVID-19 pandemic in the Netherlands with VV Pernis 1 exactly in the middle, the 7th place of 13 teams in Vierde Klasse H.
