= Jorge Braz =

Portuguese-Canadian futsal manager

Personal information
- Full name: Jorge Gomes Braz
- Date of birth: 25 August 1972 (age 54)
- Place of birth: Edmonton, Alberta, Canada

Managerial career
- Years: Team
- 2011–: Portugal

Jorge Gomes Braz (born 25 August 1972) is a Portuguese-Canadian futsal manager who manages the Portugal national futsal team.

== Career ==
In 2011, Braz was appointed manager of the Portugal national futsal team. Ten years later, he helped them win the 2021 FIFA Futsal World Cup, their first-ever World Cup.
