= Hossein Shams =

Iranian professional futsal coach (born 1961)

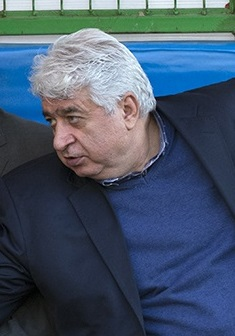

Personal information
- Full name: Hossein Shams
- Date of birth: 6 April 1961 (age 65)
- Place of birth: Saveh, Iran

Youth career
- Majd (football)

Senior career*
Years	Team	Apps	(Gls)
1980–1987	Vahdat (football)		
1987–1988	Setad Moshtarak (football)		
1988–1990	Tehranjavan (football)		

Managerial career
- 1990–1993: Vahdat (assistant)
- 1993–1995: Bank Melli (assistant)
- 1995–1998: Fath
- 1998–2000: Iran
- 2000–2002: Pas
- 2002–2003: Bahrain
- 2003–2006: Kuwait
- 2006–2011: Iran
- 2013: Tasisat Daryaei
- 2014: Dabiri
- 2015: Mes Sungun
- 2016: Azad University
- 2017: Giti Pasand
- 2022: Ghand Katrin (technical director)
- * Club domestic league appearances and goals as of 13 August 2022 ‡ National team caps and goals as of 13 August 2022

Hossein Shams (Persian: حسین شمس; born 6 April 1961) is an Iranian professional futsal coach and former footballer.

== Honours ==
=== National team ===
- Champions, AFC Futsal Championship, 1999, 2000, 2007, 2008, 2010
- Champions, Confederations Cup, 2009
- Runners-up, Grand Prix de Futsal, 2007, 2009

=== Individual ===
- Best National Team Coach of the World (Dimitri Nicolaou Award): 2009
