= José Venancio López (futsal player) =

Spanish futsal player and manager

Personal information
- Full name: José Venancio López Hierro
- Date of birth: 27 June 1964 (age 62)
- Place of birth: Bilbao, Spain

Team information
- Current team: Uzbekistan (manager)

Senior career*
Years	Team	Apps	(Gls)
1979–89	Leioa		

Managerial career
- 1988–1992: Leioa
- 1993–1994: Bilbao
- 1994–1997: Castro
- 1996–1998: Spain
- 1998–2002: Caja Segovia
- 2003: Guatemala
- 2004–2007: Lobelle
- 2007–2018: Spain
- * Club domestic league appearances and goals

José Venancio López Hierro (born 27 June 1964) is a Spanish former futsal player, and the current manager of the Uzbek national futsal team.

== Coaching achievements ==
- Silver medalist at the FIFA Futsal World Cup in 2008
- UEFA Futsal Championship champion (2): 2007, 2010
- Futsal European Clubs Championship champion in 2000
- Intercontinental Futsal Cup champion: 2000
- División de Honor de Futsal LNFS champion: 1998/99
- Copa de España de Futsal champion (3): 1999, 2000, 2006
- Spanish Futsal Super Cup (3): 1999, 2000, 2001
- Winner of the Cup Winners' Cup: 2007
