= Futsal Women's European Champions =

- Founded: 2017; 9 years ago
- Region: Europe
- Current champions: (Italy) Bitonto C5 Femminile
- Website: Official website

The Futsal Women's European Champions is an futsal competition for women's European club teams.

In 2017-2020 editions the name of the tournament was European Women's Futsal Tournament.

== Winners by year ==
Edition	Champion	Score	Runner-up	Third place	Score	Fourth place	Teams	Host
2017	(Spain) Atlético Navalcarnero	3–2	(Italy) Montesilvano Femminile	(Russia) FC Aurora Saint Petersburg	1–0	(Ukraine) WFC Inter Media Service Kyiv	6	Navalcarnero, Spain
2018	(Spain) Atlético Navalcarnero	5–2	(Portugal) SL Benfica A	(Italy) Olimpus Roma	5–2	(Russia) MosPolytech	6	Drachten, Netherlands
2019	(Spain) Roldán FSF	5–2	(Italy) Kick Off	(Portugal) SL Benfica A	2–0	(Russia) FC Aurora Saint Petersburg	8	San Javier, Spain
2020*	(Spain) Atlético Navalcarnero	2–2 (p) 7–6	(Portugal) Nun'Alvares Futsal	(Italy) Kick Off	4–1	(Netherlands) Feyenoord Futsal	4	Getafe, Spain
2021	(Spain) Pescados Rubén Burela	6–0	(Italy) Futsal Pescara	(Russia) MFC Normanochka / (Portugal) SL Benfica			5	Lugo, Spain
2022	(Italy) Città di Falconara	3–2	(Portugal) SL Benfica	(Spain) Futsi Navalcarnero	6–2	(Hungary) Deac	6	Falconara Marittima, Italy
2023	(Portugal) SL Benfica	1–1 (p) 5–4	(Italy) Bitonto C5 Femminile	(Spain) Pescados Rubén Burela FS	Group	(Netherlands) FC Marlène	4	Burela, Spain
2024	(Italy) Bitonto C5 Femminile	8–0	(Poland) Rekord Bielsko-Biala	(Hungary) TFSE-Tent Budapest	1–1 (p) 4–3	(Netherlands) Os Lusitanos/Lebo Vastgoed	6	Bari, Italy

*The 2020 European Women's Futsal Tournament was cancelled due to the COVID-19 pandemic and rescheduled on 21-22 December 2021.

There wasn't 3rd place game in the 2021 edition. It wasn't determined. The clubs that took the 2nd place in their groups are marked.

There wasn't 3rd place game in the 2023 edition but 3rd and 4th places were determined based on the results of a round robin tournament.

== 2017 edition ==
The 1st European Women's Futsal Tournament was held in Navalcarnero, Spain, from 10 till 13 April 2017.

Group A

- 10 April 2017: (Portugal) FC Vermoim vs (Italy) Montesilvano Femminile, 2–3
- 11 April 2017: (Italy) Montesilvano Femminile vs (Russia) FC Aurora Saint Petersburg, 3–0
- 12 April 2017: (Russia) FC Aurora Saint Petersburg vs (Portugal) FC Vermoim, 6–4

Pos	Team	Pld	W	D	L	GF	GA	GD	Pts	Qualification
1	(Italy) Montesilvano Femminile	2	2	0	0	6	2	+4	6	Final
2	(Russia) FC Aurora Saint Petersburg	2	1	0	1	6	7	–1	3	For third place
3	(Portugal) FC Vermoim	2	0	0	2	6	9	–3	0	For fifth place

Group B

- 10 April 2017: (Netherlands) VV Pernis vs (Spain) Atlético Navalcarnero, 2–4
- 11 April 2017: (Netherlands) VV Pernis vs (Ukraine) WFC Inter Media Service Kyiv, 0–4
- 12 April 2017: (Ukraine) WFC Inter Media Service Kyiv vs (Spain) Atlético Navalcarnero, 0–12

Pos	Team	Pld	W	D	L	GF	GA	GD	Pts	Qualification
1	(Spain) Atlético Navalcarnero	2	2	0	0	16	2	+14	6	Final
2	(Ukraine) WFC Inter Media Service Kyiv	2	1	0	1	4	12	–8	3	For third place
3	(Netherlands) VV Pernis	2	0	0	2	2	8	–6	0	For fifth place

For 5th place

- 13 April 2017: (Portugal) FC Vermoim vs (Netherlands) VV Pernis, 4–0

For 3rd place

- 13 April 2017: (Russia) FC Aurora Saint Petersburg vs (Ukraine) WFC Inter Media Service Kyiv, 1–0

Final

- 13 April 2017: (Spain) Atlético Navalcarnero vs (Italy) Montesilvano Femminile, 3–2

== 2018 edition ==
The 2nd European Women's Futsal Tournament was held in Drachten, Netherlands, from 26 till 29 March 2018.

Group A

- 26 March 2018: (Italy) Olimpus Roma vs (Netherlands) Drachtster Boys / HR Piping, 5–0
- 27 March 2018: (Netherlands) Drachtster Boys / HR Piping vs (Portugal) SL Benfica A, 1–6
- 28 March 2018: (Italy) Olimpus Roma vs (Portugal) SL Benfica A, 3–7

Pos	Team	Pld	W	D	L	GF	GA	GD	Pts	Qualification
1	(Portugal) SL Benfica A	2	2	0	0	13	4	+9	6	Final
2	(Italy) Olimpus Roma	2	1	0	1	8	7	+1	3	For third place
3	(Netherlands) Drachtster Boys / HR Piping	2	0	0	2	1	11	–10	0	For fifth place

Group B

- 26 March 2018: (Ukraine) WFC Inter Media Service Kyiv vs (Spain) Atlético Navalcarnero, 1–5
- 27 March 2018: (Spain) Atlético Navalcarnero vs (Russia) MosPolytech, 3–0
- 28 March 2018: (Ukraine) WFC Inter Media Service Kyiv vs (Russia) MosPolytech, 1–6

Pos	Team	Pld	W	D	L	GF	GA	GD	Pts	Qualification
1	(Spain) Atlético Navalcarnero	2	2	0	0	8	1	+7	6	Final
2	(Russia) MosPolytech	2	1	0	1	6	4	+2	3	For third place
3	(Ukraine) WFC Inter Media Service Kyiv	2	0	0	2	2	11	–9	0	For fifth place

For 5th place

- 29 March 2018: (Ukraine) WFC Inter Media Service Kyiv vs (Netherlands) Drachtster Boys / HR Piping, 2–1

For 5th place

- 29 March 2018: (Italy) Olimpus Roma vs (Russia) MosPolytech, 5–2

Final

- 29 March 2018: (Spain) Atlético Navalcarnero vs (Portugal) SL Benfica A, 5–2

== 2019 edition ==
The 3rd European Women's Futsal Tournament was held in San Javier, Spain, from 16 till 19 April 2019.

Group A

- 16 April 2019: (Portugal) SL Benfica A vs (Netherlands) TPP Rotterdam, 6–0
- 16 April 2019: (Italy) Kick Off vs (Ukraine) WFC Inter Media Service Kyiv, 7–0
- 17 April 2019: (Ukraine) WFC Inter Media Service Kyiv vs (Portugal) SL Benfica A, 0–5
- 17 April 2019: (Netherlands) TPP Rotterdam vs (Italy) Kick Off, 1–5
- 18 April 2019: (Ukraine) WFC Inter Media Service Kyiv vs (Netherlands) TPP Rotterdam, 9–2
- 18 April 2019: (Italy) Kick Off vs (Portugal) SL Benfica A, 2–2

Pos	Team	Pld	W	D	L	GF	GA	GD	Pts	Qualification
1	(Italy) Kick Off	3	2	1	0	14	3	+11	7	Final
2	(Portugal) SL Benfica A	3	2	1	0	13	2	+11	7	For third place
3	(Ukraine) WFC Inter Media Service Kyiv	3	1	0	2	9	14	–5	3	For fifth place
4	(Netherlands) TPP Rotterdam	3	0	0	3	3	20	–17	0	For seventh place

Group B

- 16 April 2019: (Croatia) ŽMNK Alumnus Sesvete vs (Poland) AZS UAM Poznan, 4–3
- 16 April 2019: (Spain) Roldan FSF vs (Russia) FC Aurora Saint Petersburg, 4–3
- 17 April 2019: (Poland) AZS UAM Poznan vs (Russia) FC Aurora Saint Petersburg, 0–8
- 17 April 2019: (Spain) Roldan FSF vs (Croatia) ŽMNK Alumnus Sesvete, 3–0
- 18 April 2019: (Russia) FC Aurora Saint Petersburg vs (Croatia) ŽMNK Alumnus Sesvete, 2–0
- 18 April 2019: (Spain) Roldan FSF vs (Poland) AZS UAM Poznan, 9–1

Pos	Team	Pld	W	D	L	GF	GA	GD	Pts	Qualification
1	(Spain) Roldan FSF	3	3	0	0	16	4	+12	9	Final
2	(Russia) FC Aurora Saint Petersburg	3	2	0	1	13	4	+9	6	For third place
3	(Croatia) ŽMNK Alumnus Sesvete	3	1	0	2	4	8	–4	3	For fifth place
4	(Poland) AZS UAM Poznan	3	0	0	3	4	21	–17	0	For seventh place

For 7th place

- 19 April 2019: (Netherlands) TPP Rotterdam vs (Poland) AZS UAM Poznan, 4–0

For 5th place

- 19 April 2019: (Ukraine) WFC Inter Media Service Kyiv vs (Croatia) ŽMNK Alumnus Sesvete, 4–3

For 3rd place

- 19 April 2019: (Portugal) SL Benfica A vs (Russia) FC Aurora Saint Petersburg, 2–0

Final

- 19 April 2019: (Spain) Roldán FSF vs (Italy) Kick Off, 5–2

== 2021 edition ==
Five teams took part in the 2021 Futsal Women's European Champions which was held in Lugo, Spain, from 2 until 5 December 2021.

Group A

- 3 December 2021: (Russia) MFK Normanochka vs (Spain) Pescados Rubén Burela, 0–5
- 4 December 2021: (Spain) Pescados Rubén Burela vs (Russia) MFK Normanochka, 5–0

Pos	Team	Pld	W	D	L	GF	GA	GD	Pts	Qualification
1	(Spain) Pescados Rubén Burela	2	2	0	0	10	0	+10	6	Final
2	(Russia) MFK Normanochka	2	0	0	2	0	10	–10	0	

- (Croatia) ZNK Osijek withdrew from tournament due to the COVID-19 outbreak in the team.

Group B

- 2 December 2021: (Portugal) SL Benfica vs (Ukraine) WFC Tesla Kharkiv, 4–0
- 3 December 2021: (Ukraine) WFC Tesla Kharkiv vs (Italy) Futsal Pescara, 2–3
- 4 December 2021: (Italy) Futsal Pescara vs (Portugal) SL Benfica, 1–0

Pos	Team	Pld	W	D	L	GF	GA	GD	Pts	Qualification
1	(Italy) Futsal Pescara	2	2	0	0	4	2	+2	6	Final
2	(Portugal) SL Benfica	2	1	0	1	4	1	+3	3	
3	(Ukraine) WFC Tesla Kharkiv	2	0	0	2	2	7	–5	0	

Final

- 5 December 2021: (Spain) Pescados Rubén Burela vs (Italy) Futsal Pescara, 6–0

== 2022 edition ==
Six teams took part in the 2022 European Women's Futsal Tournament which was held in Falconara Marittima, Italy, from 19 until 22 December 2022.

Gruppo A

Squadra	P.ti	G	V	N	P	GF	GS	DR
(Italy) Città di Falconara	6	2	2	0	0	14	1	+13
(Hungary) Deac	3	2	1	0	1	1	2	-1
(Netherlands) DRS Vijfje	0	2	0	0	2	1	13	-12

Gruppo B

Squadra	P.ti	G	V	N	P	GF	GS	DR
(Portugal) Benfica	6	2	2	0	0	18	3	+15
(Spain) Atletico Navalcarnero	3	2	1	0	1	12	10	+2
(Poland) Uam Poznan	0	2	0	0	2	2	19	-17

Final

- 22 December 2022: (Italy) Città di Falconara vs (Portugal) Benfica, 3-2

== 2023 edition ==
Four teams took part in the 2023 Futsal Women's European Champions which was held in Burela, Spain, from 18 until 22 December 2023.

Group matches

- 19 December 2023: (Portugal) SL Benfica vs (Italy) Bitonto C5 Femminile, 4–3
- 19 December 2023: (Spain) Pescados Rubén Burela FS vs (Netherlands) FC Marlène, 6–0
- 20 December 2023: (Spain) Pescados Rubén Burela FS vs (Portugal) SL Benfica, 3–1
- 20 December 2023: (Italy) Bitonto C5 Femminile vs (Netherlands) FC Marlène, 13–0
- 21 December 2023: (Portugal) SL Benfica vs (Netherlands) FC Marlène, 12–2
- 21 December 2023: (Spain) Pescados Rubén Burela FS vs (Italy) Bitonto C5 Femminile, 3–5

Standings

Pos	Team	Pld	W	D	L	GF	GA	GD	Pts	Qualification
1	(Italy) Bitonto C5 Femminile	3	2	0	1	21	7	+14	6	Final
2	(Portugal) SL Benfica	3	2	0	1	17	8	+9	6	Final
3	(Spain) Pescados Rubén Burela FS	3	2	0	1	12	6	+6	6	
4	(Netherlands) FC Marlène	3	0	0	3	2	31	–29	0	

Final

- 22 December 2023: (Italy) Bitonto C5 Femminile vs (Portugal) SL Benfica, 1–1 (p) 4–5
