= Futsal Hoofdklasse (women) =

Dutch women's futsal league

Hoofdklasse
- Country: Netherlands
- Confederation: UEFA
- Number of clubs: 76
- Level on pyramid: 2
- Website: http://www.knvb.nl
- Current: 2016-17

The Hoofdklasse is the second level women's futsal league in the Netherlands, organized by the Royal Dutch Football Association. The competition, which is played under UEFA rules, currently consists of 76 teams.
