= Primera División Femenina de Futsal =

Primera División
- Founded: 1994
- Country: Spain
- Confederation: UEFA
- Number of clubs: 16
- Level on pyramid: 1
- Relegation to: Segunda División
- Domestic cup: Copa de España
- Current champions: Atlético Navalcarnero (2025–26)
- Most championships: Elche
- Website: www.rfef.es
- Current: 2025–26 season

The Primera División is the women's premier futsal league in Spain, is operated by the Liga Nacional de Fútbol Sala. It was founded in 1994, which is played under UEFA rules and currently consists of 16 teams.

== Liga championship rules ==
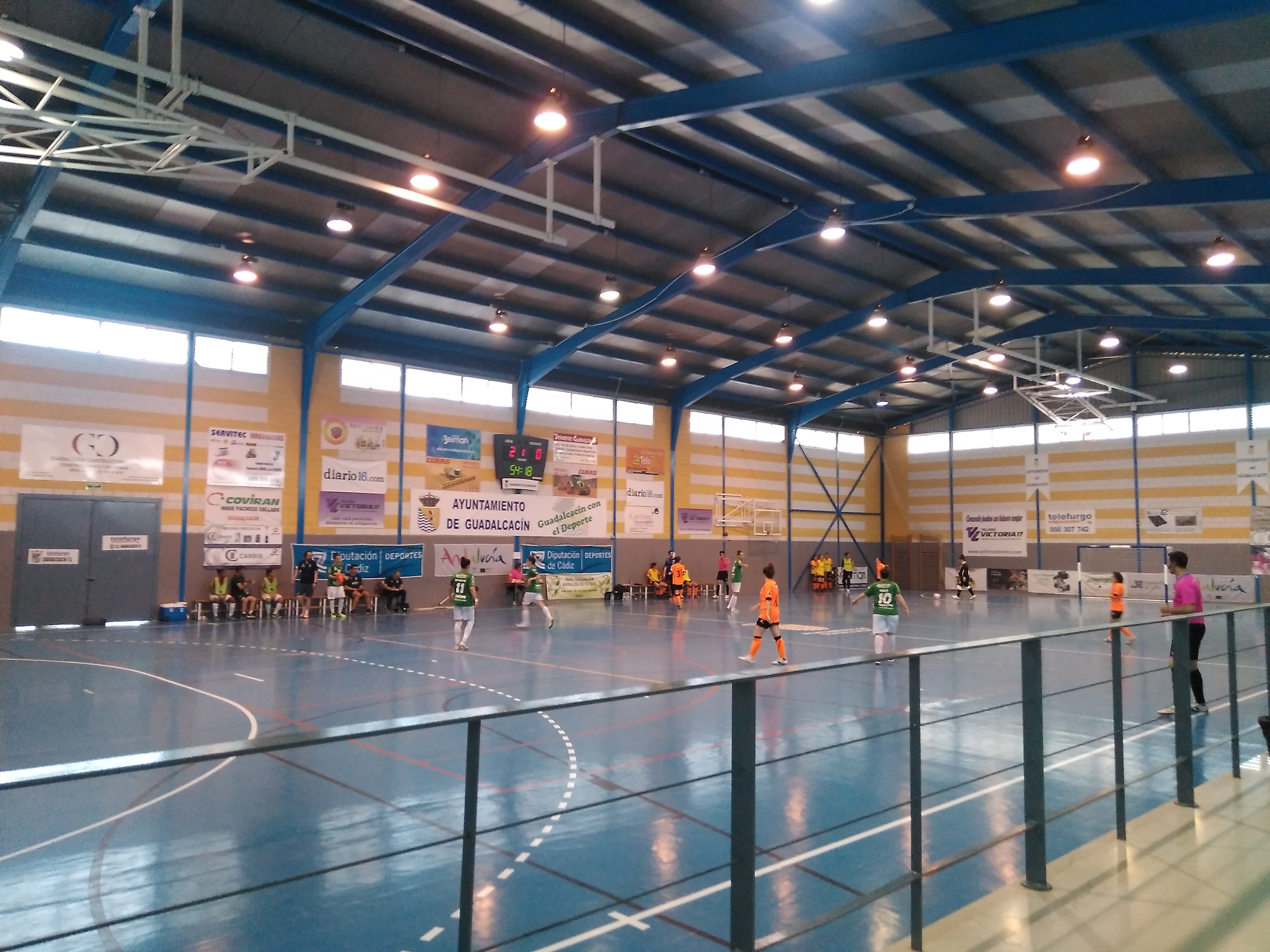
Match Guadalcacín FS CD - Viaxes Amarelle FS 2019

Each team has to play with all the other teams twice, once at home and the other at the opponent's stadium. This means that in Primera División Femenina the league ends after every team plays 30 matches.

Like men's Primera División, the Primera División Femenina de Futsal takes a winter break once each team has played half its schedule. One unusual feature of the league is that the two halves of the season are played in the same order—that is, the order of each team's first-half fixtures is repeated in the second half of the season, with the only difference being the stadiums used.

Each victory adds 3 points to the team in the league ranking. Each drawn adds 1 point. At the end of the league, the winner is:

1. The team that has most points in the ranking.
2. If two or more teams are level on points, the winner is the team that has the best results head-to-head.
3. If there is no winner after applying the second rule, then the team with the best overall goal difference wins.

== Champions by year ==
Source: Futsalplanet

Year	Team
1994–95	Sal Lence Coruña
1995–96	Sal Lence Coruña
1996–97	Femesala Elche
1997–98	Femesala Elche
1998–99	C.D. Ourense
1999–2000	Femesala Elche
2000–01	Móstoles
2001–02	UCAM Murcia
2002–03	UCAM Murcia
2003–04	Femesala Elche
2004–05	Femesala Elche
2005–06	Móstoles
2006–07	Femesala Elche
2007–08	Femesala Elche
2008–09	Cajasur Córdoba
2009–10	Cajasur Córdoba

Year	Team
2010–11	Ponte Ourense
2011–12	Atlético de Madrid Navalcarnero
2012–13	Burela Pescados Rubén
2013–14	Atlético de Madrid Navalcarnero
2014–15	Atlético de Madrid Navalcarnero
2015–16	Burela Pescados Rubén
2016–17	Atlético de Madrid Navalcarnero
2017–18	Jimbee Roldán
2018–19	Atlético de Madrid Navalcarnero
2019–20	Pescados Rubén Burela
2020–21	Pescados Rubén Burela
2021–22	Atlético Navalcarnero
2022–23	Pescados Rubén Burela
2023–24	Pescados Rubén Burela
2024–25	Atlético Navalcarnero
2025–26	Atlético Navalcarnero

=== Performance by club ===
Club	Titles	Last title
Atlético Navalcarnero	8	2026
Femesala Elche	7	2008
CD Burela FS	6	2024
Móstoles	2	2006
UCAM Murcia	2	2003
Cajasur Córdoba	2	2010
Sal Lence Coruña	2	1996
Ponte Ourense	1	2011
Jimbee Roldán	1	2018
C.D. Ourense	1	1999
