= Jesús Candelas =

Spanish futsal coach

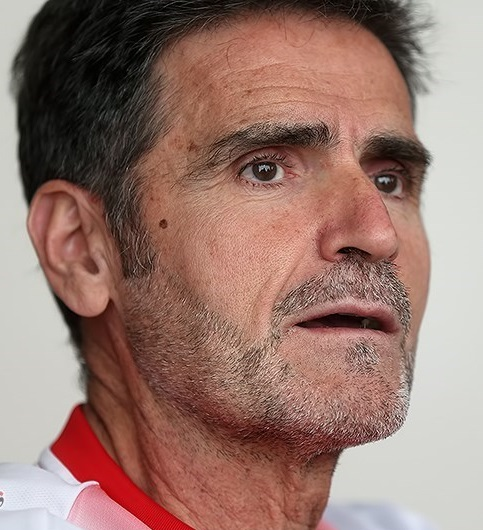

Personal information
- Full name: Jesús Candelas Rodrigo
- Date of birth: 7 October 1957 (age 69)
- Place of birth: Madrid, Spain
- Height: 1.70 m (5 ft 7 in)

Managerial career
- Years: Team
- 1987–1989: Marsanz Torrejón
- 1989–1992: Algón
- 1992–1996: Mejorada
- 1996–1998: Caja Segovia
- 1998–2008: Interviu Boomerang
- 2013–2015: Iran
- ‡ National team caps and goals as of 19:00, 04 March 2014 (UTC)

Jesús Candelas Rodrigo (born 7 October 1957) is a Spanish professional futsal coach.

== Career ==
=== Spain ===
Candelas has managed four teams in Spain, which he first managed Algon for three years which his performance was bad. In 1996 when he managed Caja Segovia he led 2 championship titles and runners-up for Genk Tournament, after when he left Caja, he was appointed as Boomerang manager which he was successful leading them in a total of 3 championships and LFNS division runner-up and super cup winner in 2001.

=== Iran ===
During his term as the head coach of Iran he performed descent, before becoming coach in March 2013 Candelas was appointed as technical director of Iran futsal team in September 2012. He was appointed as team's head coach after Ali Sanei's contract with team meli was terminated due to poor and disappointing results at the 2012 FIFA Futsal World Cup held in Thailand, and a drop in the world ranking from 4th place to 7th. Candelas had his debut right after the lost against Colombia at the World Cup, Iran had two friendly matches at Qom where they tied both games against Russia. Candelas was supposed to be an interim coach but when he impressed Iranians by managing 15 undefeated streak matches, Abbas Torabian and Kafashian decided to let him stay for longer. In July 2013 he extended his contract with Iran for another year. One big achievement he did for Iran was being undefeated for many matches in a row, making Iran champions at 2013 Asian Indoor-Martial Arts Games, two bronze at Grand Prix de Futsal.

==== 2014 AFC Futsal Championship ====
Iran automatically qualified at the championship since they were semi-finalists in the last edition in 2012. Jesús team faced Indonesia in the first match and they won 5–1, They also defeated China with a score of 12-0, and Australia 8–1. Iran advanced to next round with 9 points, they defeated Vietnam in Quarter-Finals. In the Semi-Final, Iran played Uzbekistan with the score of 10–0. They eventually lost to Japan on penalties, after leading Japan 2-1 later Hamid Ahmadi scored an own goal which equalized the match. Iran finished as runner-up, having scored the more comparing to their previous edition. Iran scored 52 goals and conceded 8 goals in the whole tournament.

== Honours ==
Spain

- Primera División: 5
  - 2001–02, 2002–03, 2003–04, 2004–05, 2007–08
- Copa de España (LNFS): 4
  - 2000–01, 2003–04, 2004–05, 2006–07
- Supercopa de España: 5
  - 2001–02, 2002–03, 2003–04, 2005–06, 2007–08
- UEFA Futsal Cup: 2
  - 2003-04, 2005–06
- Intercontinental Cup: 4
  - 2004-05, 2005–06, 2006–07, 2007–08
- European Cup Winners' Cup: 1
  - 2007-08
- Iberian Cup: 2
  - 2004, 2006

Iran

- AFC Futsal Championship: 0
  - 2014 Runner-Up
- Grand Prix de Futsal: 0
  - 2013 Third-Place, 2014 Third-Place
- Asian Indoor and Martial Arts Games: 1
  - 2013

== Managerial statistics ==
As of 11 February 2015.

Team	From	To								
Team	From	To	G	W	D	L	Win %	GF	GA	GD
Mejorada FS (Spain)	September 1992	April 1996	92	32	17	43	34.78	310	356	-46
Inter Movistar (Spain)	September 1998	April 2008	313	198	61	54	63.26	1430	811	+619
Iran	January 2013	March 2015	42	32	7	3	76.19	239	80	+159
