= Leo Higuita =

Futsal player

Personal information
- Full name: Leonardo de Melo Vieira Leite
- Date of birth: 6 June 1986 (age 40)
- Place of birth: Rio de Janeiro, Brazil
- Height: 1.80 m (5 ft 11 in)
- Position: Goalkeeper

Team information
- Current team: FC Semey
- Number: 2

Youth career
- Social Ramos
- CSSE
- River FC
- Flamengo
- Fluminense
- Vasco da Gama
- Cabo Frio

Senior career*
Years	Team	Apps	(Gls)
2006–2008	Cabo Frio		
2009	Vasco da Gama		
2009–2010	MFC Tulpar		
2010	Belenenses		
2011–	AFC Kairat		

International career
2013–	Kazakhstan	30	(27)
- * Club domestic league appearances and goals

Leonardo de Melo Vieira Leite (born 6 June 1986), commonly known as Leo Higuita, is a Brazilian born Kazakh futsal player who plays as a goalkeeper for AFC Kairat and the Kazakhstan national futsal team.

His goalscoring ability led to his nickname of "Higuita".

== Honours ==
- UEFA Futsal Champions League: 2012/13, 2014/15
