= Atlético Navalcarnero =

Atlético de Madrid Navalcarnero
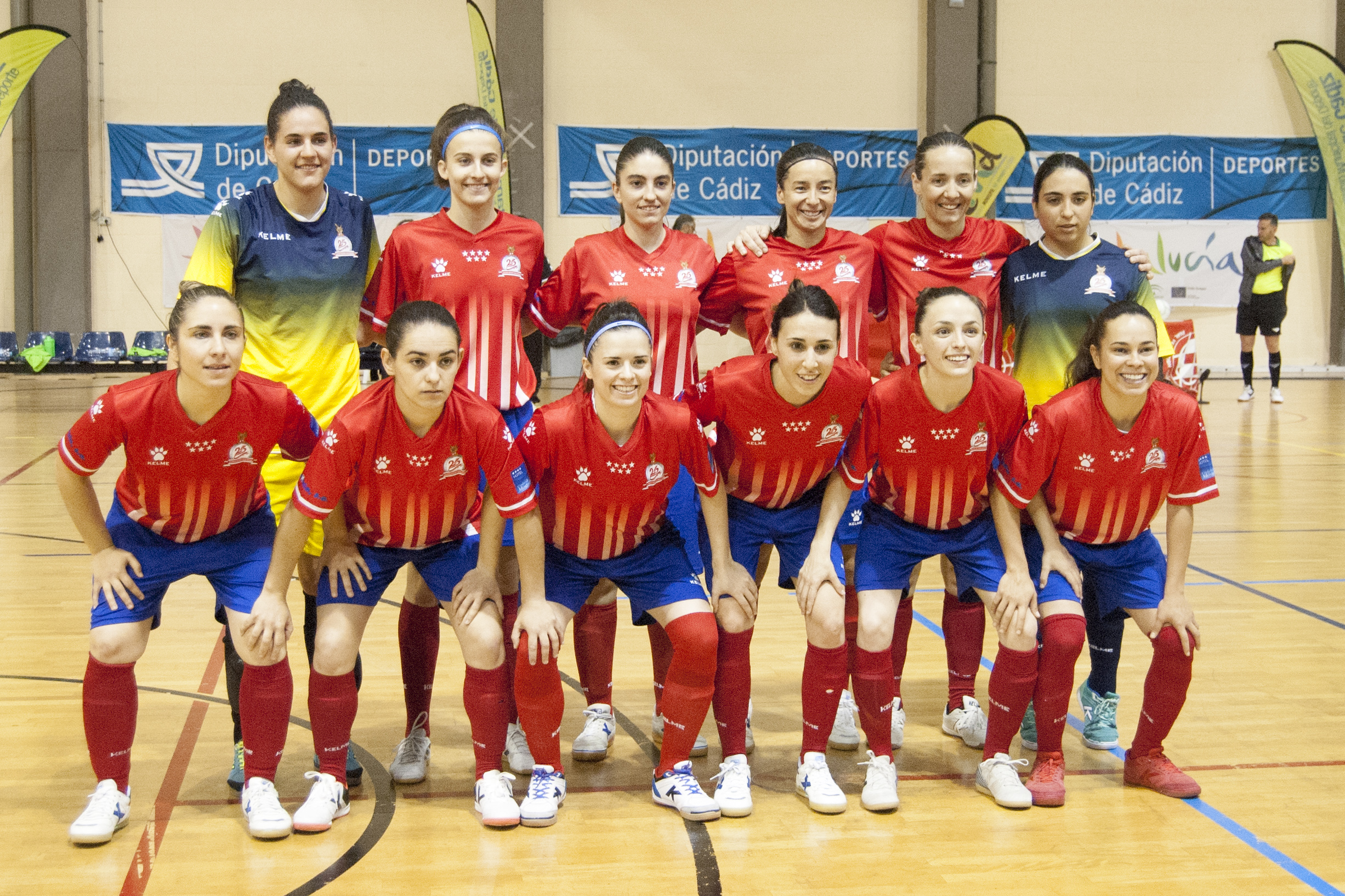
- Full name: C. D. Futsi Atlético Féminas
- Nicknames: colchoneras, rojiblancas, indias
- Founded: 1992
- Ground: Polideportivo Municipal La Estación
- Capacity: 1,500
- Chairman: Jose Manuel Igea
- Manager: Andrés Sanz
- League: Primera División
- 2016–17: Primera División, 1st / W
Home colours	Away colours

Futsi Atlético Navalcarnero is a Spanish Primera División women's futsal club based in Navalcarnero.

== History ==
The club won the Spanish championship in season 2015–2016.

In 2017, the team will participate in the European Women's Futsal Tournament together with the champions from Italy, Portugal, Russia, Ukraine and the Netherlands. Atlético Navalcarnero is the organizing club.

=== Club names ===
- 1999–2006: Futsi Atlético Féminas
- 2006–2009: Encofra Navalcarnero
- 2009–2015: Atlético de Madrid Navalcarnero
- Since 2015: Futsi Atlético Navalcarnero

== Club honours ==
=== Regional competitions ===
- Trofeo Comunidad de Madrid: 16 (1999, 2000, 2002, 2003, 2010, 2013, 2014, 2015, 2016, 2017, 2018, 2019, 2021, 2022, 2023, 2024)

Runners-up: 3 (2001, 2004, 2009)

- Copa Federación Madrileña: 1 (2012)

=== National competitions ===
- Primera División 8 (2011–12, 2013–14, 2014–15, 2016–17, 2018–19, 2021-22, 2024-25, 2025-26)
- Copa de la Reina: 7 (2007, 2008, 2009, 2014, 2015, 2016, 2018)

Runners-up: (6) (2012, 2013, 2017, 2019, 2022, 2024)

- Supercopa de España: 8 (2008, 2012, 2013, 2014, 2016, 2017, 2018, 2025)

Runners-up: (6) (2007, 2009, 2015, 2020, 2022, 2026)

=== European competitions ===
- European Women's Futsal Tournament: 4 (2017, 2018), 2021, 2026)
- Iberian Cup: 1 (2012)

== Players ==
=== Current Squad 2017/18 ===
No.	Player	Full name	Pos.	Nat.
1	Nadia	Nadia	Goalkeeper	(Ukraine)
13	Estela	Estela García Rodero	Goalkeeper	(Spain)
28	Marta	Marta Balbuena	Goalkeeper	(Spain)
4	Marta Pelegrín	Marta Pelegrín González	Defender	(Spain)
5	Ari	Ariane Nascimento da Silva	Defender	(Brazil)
7	Leti	Leticia Sánchez Martín	Defender	(Spain)
16	Irene	Irene Cordoba	Wing	(Spain)
18	María Sanz	María Sanz Navarro	Wing	(Spain)
14	Anita Luján	Ana Sevilla Luján	Wing	(Spain)
29	Pilar Ros	Pilar Ros	Wing	(Spain)
8	Bruna	Bruna Franklin	Forward	(Brazil)
9	Ju Delgado	Juliana Delgado Lautenschalager	Forward	(Brazil)
10	Amelia Romero	Amelia Romero de la Flor	Forward	(Spain)
15	Gaby	Gabriela Villa Real Macedo	Forward	(Brazil)

=== Notable players ===
- (Spain) Vanessa Barberá
- (Brazil) Raquel Souza
- (Spain) Patricia Chamorro
- (Spain) Isabel Izquierdo
- (Spain) Silvia Fernández
- (Spain) Eva Manguan
- (Spain) Laura Fernández
- (Spain) Sara Iturriaga
- (Spain) Jennifer Pedro
- (Brazil) Priscila Farias
- (Spain) Rosana Carballes
- (Spain) Anita Luján
- (Spain) Natalia Flores
- (Spain) Belén de Uña
- (Brazil) Fabiana Ribeiro
- (Brazil) Juliana Delgado
- (Spain) Leticia Sánchez
- (Brazil) Ariane Nacimento
- (Spain) Amelia Romero
- (Spain) Marta Pelegrín
