= UEFA Futsal Euro 2026 final =

International futsal match

- The Arena Stožice hosted the final.
- Event: UEFA Futsal Euro 2026
Portugal	Spain
3	5
- Date: 7 February 2026
- Venue: Arena Stožice, Ljubljana
- Player of the Match: (Spain) Antonio Pérez
- Referee: Dejan Veselič (SLO); Nicola Manzione (ITA)

The UEFA Futsal Euro 2026 final was the final match of the UEFA Futsal Euro 2026, the 13th edition of the quadrennial continental tournament in men's national futsal teams, organised by Europe's governing body, UEFA. The match was played at Arena Stožice in Ljubljana, Slovenia, on 7 February 2026, and was contested by defending champions Portugal and Spain.

The tournament comprised co-hosts Latvia, Lithuania and Slovenia and 13 other teams. The 16 teams competed in a group stage, from which 8 teams qualified for the quarter-finals and 4 later advanced to the semifinals.

For Portugal, it is their fourth final and it is also the tenth final for the Spanish. This is the third time they have met each other in a European Championship final after 2010 and 2018, with each team winning once. Their last appearances for Portugal and Spain in the final were in 2022 and 2018 respectively.

Spain won their eighth title after beating Portugal 5–3 in the final in Ljubljana.

== Background ==
The 2026 UEFA Futsal Championship, commonly referred to as UEFA Futsal Euro 2026, was the 13th edition of the UEFA Futsal Championship, the quadrennial international futsal championship organised by UEFA for the men's national teams of Europe.

This was the second tournament to be held on a four-year basis after 2022. It took place between 21 January and 7 February 2026. The tournament was supposed to be held solely in Latvia and Lithuania, but due to their unwillingness to accommodate Belarus, UEFA added Slovenia as a third co-host as the Slovenians agreed to hosting the Belarusian team. This marked the first time the Futsal Euro was co-hosted and the first UEFA tournament to have three nations hosting (excluding UEFA Euro 2020 as twelve cities across Europe hosted the event). This was the first time a senior UEFA national team tournament was held in the Baltics.

For the second time after the expansion in 2022, 16 teams took part. Qualification took place between April 2024 and September 2025. The original two co-hosts, Latvia and Lithuania, qualified automatically, becoming the first host nations to make their debut at the same tournament they are hosting. Armenia also made their debut.

== Route to the final ==
Note: In all results below, the score of the finalist is given first.

Portugal
Round
Spain
Opponent
Result
Group stage
Opponent
Result
Italy
6–2
Match 1
Slovenia
4–1
Hungary
5–1
Match 2
Belarus
2–0
Poland
3–2
Match 3
Belgium
10–3
Group D placement

Pos	Team	Pld	Pts
1	Portugal	3	9
2	Italy	3	4
3	Hungary	3	4
4	Poland	3	0

Source: UEFA
Final standings
Group C placement

Pos	Team	Pld	Pts
1	Spain	3	9
2	Belgium	3	3
3	Slovenia (H)	3	3
4	Belarus	3	3

Source: UEFA
(H) Hosts
Opponent
Result
Knockout stage
Opponent
Result
Belgium
8–2
Quarter-finals
Italy
4–0
France
4–1
Semi-finals
Croatia
2–1

== Venue ==
The Arena Stožice hosted the final. This will be the second time they host the final after 2018.

UEFA Futsal Euro 2026 final is located in Slovenia	Ljubljana
UEFA Futsal Euro 2026 final is located in Slovenia	Arena Stožice
UEFA Futsal Euro 2026 final is located in Slovenia	Capacity: 10,600

== Match ==
7 February 2026
19:30 UTC+1

Portugal	3–5	Spain
Afonso 4'43"; Góis 6'35"; Pauleta 29'19"	Report	Pérez 1'18", 19'20" (pen.), 35'20"; Raya 2'29"; Adolfo 39'55"

Arena Stožice, Ljubljana
Attendance: 8,126
Referee: Dejan Veselič (Slovenia), Nicola Manzione (Italy)

GK	12	Bernardo Paçó
DF	3	Tomás Paçó
DF	8	Erick	(yellow card) 19'18"'
DF	10	Bruno Coelho
FW	11	Pany Varela
Substitutions:
GK	1	Edu
DF	2	André Coelho
DF	4	Afonso
FW	5	Rúben Góis	(yellow card) 15'34"'
FW	6	Kutchy
FW	7	Lúcio Rocha
DF	9	Diogo Santos	(yellow card) 39'38"'
FW	13	Tiago Brito
FW	14	Pauleta
Manager:
Jorge Braz

GK	21	Dídac Plana
DF	6	Antonio Pérez
FW	9	Pablo Ramírez
FW	11	Francisco Cortés
DF	13	Miguel Ángel Mellado
Substitutions:
GK	1	Chemi Oliver
FW	2	Cecilio Morales	(yellow card) 15'34"'
DF	3	Ricardo Mayor
DF	4	Adri Rivera
DF	7	José Raya
FW	8	Adolfo Fernández Díaz
FW	10	Mario Rivillos	(yellow card) 22'51"'
FW	14	Jesús Gordillo
FW	20	David Novoa
Manager:
Jesús Velasco

Third referee:
(Czech Republic) Ondřej Černý
Fourth referee:
(Croatia) Nikola Jelić
Timekeeper:
(Slovenia) Aleš Močnik Perič
Referee observer:
(Belgium) Perry Gautier
UEFA Delegate:
(Croatia) Dario Skender

Match rules

- Two halves of 20 minutes (40 minutes in total).
- 10 minutes of extra time if necessary.
- Penalty shoot-out if scores still level.

=== Statistics ===
Overall
Statistics	Portugal	Spain
Goals scored	3	5
Total shots	32	43
Shots on target	10	17
Shots off target	15	18
Corner kicks	13	10
Fouls committed	11	5
Woodwork	0	2
Blocks	8	5
Yellow cards	3	2
Red cards	0	0

== Squads ==
Portugal

No.	Pos.	Player	Date of birth (age)	Club
1	GK	Edu	19 August 1996 (aged 29)	(Royal Spanish Football Federation) ElPozo Murcia
12	GK	Bernardo Paçó	19 April 2000 (aged 25)	(Portuguese Football Federation) Sporting
2	DF	André Coelho	30 October 1993 (aged 32)	(Portuguese Football Federation) Benfica
3	DF	Tomás Paçó	19 April 2000 (aged 25)	(Portuguese Football Federation) Sporting
4	DF	Afonso	6 January 1998 (aged 28)	(Portuguese Football Federation) Benfica
8	DF	Erick	21 July 1995 (aged 30)	(Royal Spanish Football Federation) FC Barcelona
9	DF	Diogo Santos	7 November 2002 (aged 23)	(Portuguese Football Federation) Sporting
10	DF	Bruno Coelho	1 August 1987 (aged 38)	(Latvian Football Federation) Riga FC
5	FW	Rúben Góis	13 September 2001 (aged 24)	(Portuguese Football Federation) Rio Ave
6	FW	Kutchy	12 October 2002 (aged 23)	(Portuguese Football Federation) Benfica
7	FW	Lúcio Rocha	5 May 2004 (aged 21)	(Portuguese Football Federation) Benfica
11	FW	Pany	25 February 1989 (aged 36)	(Portuguese Football Federation) Benfica
13	FW	Tiago Brito	22 July 1991 (aged 34)	(Portuguese Football Federation) Braga
14	FW	Pauleta	12 June 1994 (aged 31)	(Portuguese Football Federation) Sporting

Spain

No.	Pos.	Player	Date of birth (age)	Club
1	GK	Chemi Oliver	19 February 1996 (aged 29)	(Royal Spanish Football Federation) Cartagena
21	GK	Dídac Plana	22 May 1990 (aged 35)	(Royal Spanish Football Federation) Barcelona
3	DF	Ricardo Mayor	21 February 2000 (aged 25)	(Royal Spanish Football Federation) Elpozo Murcia
4	DF	Adri Rivera	11 January 2002 (aged 24)	(Royal Spanish Football Federation) Elpozo Murcia
6	DF	Antonio Pérez	19 October 2000 (aged 25)	(Royal Spanish Football Federation) Barcelona
7	DF	José Raya	8 May 1997 (aged 28)	(Royal Spanish Football Federation) Inter F. S.
13	DF	Miguel Mellado	23 July 1999 (aged 26)	(Royal Spanish Football Federation) Cartagena
2	FW	Cecilio Morales	6 July 1992 (aged 33)	(Royal Spanish Football Federation) Inter F. S.
8	FW	Adolfo Fernández	19 May 1993 (aged 32)	(Royal Spanish Football Federation) Barcelona
9	FW	Pablo Ramírez	25 February 2001 (aged 24)	(Royal Spanish Football Federation) Cartagena
10	FW	Mario Rivillos	13 December 1989 (aged 36)	(Royal Spanish Football Federation) Palma
11	FW	Francisco Cortés	13 October 1995 (aged 30)	(Royal Spanish Football Federation) Cartagena
14	FW	Jesús Gordillo	8 February 2001 (aged 24)	(Russian Football Union) Tyumen
20	FW	David Novoa	8 June 2002 (aged 23)	(Royal Spanish Football Federation) O Parrulo
