= Edu Sousa =

Portuguese futsal player

Personal information
- Full name: Eduardo Filipe Sousa Veiga
- Date of birth: 19 August 1996 (age 30)
- Place of birth: Mirandela, Portugal
- Height: 1.90 m (6 ft 3 in)
- Position: Goalkeeper

Senior career*
Years	Team	Apps	(Gls)
2013–2015	CD Debabarrena		
2015–2017	Zierbena FS		
2017–2019	Osasuña Magna		
2019–2023	Viña Albali Valdepeñas		
2023–	ElPozo Murcia		

International career
2019–	Portugal	48	(2)
Medal record
Men's futsal
Representing Portugal
UEFA Futsal Championship
Runner-up	2026 Latvia / Lithuania / Slovenia
- * Club domestic league appearances and goals as of 24 September 2024

Eduardo Filipe Sousa Veiga (born 19 August 1996), simply known as Edu Sousa, is a Portuguese professional futsal player who plays as a goalkeeper.

== Career ==
Born in Mirandela, Portugal, Sousa moved to Eibar in Spain at the age of 12, and began his career with CD Debabarrena. After standing out for Osasuña Magna in the Primera División de Futsal, he was called up to the Portugal futsal team, being part of the UEFA Euro 2022 and Finalissima champion squads.

== Honours ==
Portugal

- UEFA Futsal Euro: 2022
- Futsal Finalissima: 2022
