= Serbia national futsal team =

Serbia
- Nickname(s): Orlovi (The Eagles)
- Association: Football Association of Serbia
- Confederation: UEFA (Europe)
- Head coach: (Serbia) Dejan Maješ
- Captain: Miloš Simić
- FIFA code: SRB
- FIFA ranking: 31 ▼5 (8 May 2026)
Home colours	Away colours

First international
- Italy 4–2 Yugoslavia (Grado, Italy; 8 December 1987)

Biggest win
- Bulgaria 0–8 Serbia (Gabrovo, Bulgaria; 9 February 2008); Serbia 9–1 Romania (Belgrade, Serbia; 8 December 2011); Serbia 10–2 Gibraltar (Paola, Malta; 30 November 2014)

Biggest defeat
- Yugoslavia 1–9 Spain (Pančevo, Yugoslavia; 25 November 1998)

FIFA World Cup
- Appearances: 2 (First in 2012)
- Best result: Round of 16 (2012, 2021)

European Championship
- Appearances: 6 (First in 1999)
- Best result: Fourth place (2016)

Grand Prix de Futsal
- Appearances: 2 (First in 2008)
- Best result: 5th place (2008)

The Serbia national futsal team represents Serbia in international futsal competitions such as the FIFA Futsal World Cup and the European Championships and is controlled by the Football Association of Serbia.

== Results and fixtures ==
The following is a list of match results in the last 12 months, as well as any future matches that have been scheduled.

Legend

Win Draw Lose Fixture

=== 2021 ===
14 September 2021 FIFA Futsal World Cup GS Group F	Serbia	2–3	Iran	Vilnius, Lithuania
18:00 EEST (UTC+3)	Stojković 18'; Tomić 38'	Report	Ahmadi 4'; Fakhimzadeh 4'; Esmaeilpour 37'	Stadium: Avia Solutions Group Arena; Attendance: 766; Referee: Carlos González (Guatemala)

17 September 2021 FIFA Futsal World Cup GS Group F	Argentina	4–2	Serbia	Vilnius, Lithuania
20:00 EEST (UTC+3)	Aksentijević 9' (o.g.); Brandi 11'; Vaporaki 11'; Borruto 24'	Report	Rakić 7'; Lazarević 10'	Stadium: Avia Solutions Group Arena; Attendance: 1,434; Referee: Nurdin Bukuev (Kyrgyzstan)

20 September 2021 FIFA Futsal World Cup GS Group F	United States	0–7	Serbia	Klaipėda, Lithuania
20:00 EEST (UTC+3)		Report	Rakić 6'; Tomić 8', 17'; Petrov 20'; Milosavljević 32'; Lazarević 33'; Radovanović 38'	Stadium: Švyturys Arena; Referee: Chris Sinclair (New Zealand)

24 September 2021 FIFA Futsal World Cup R16	Portugal	4–3 (a.e.t.)	Serbia	Kaunas, Lithuania
20:00	Ricardinho 14'; André 15'; Pany 43', 43'	Report	Lazarević 23', 28'; Matos 50' (o.g.)	Stadium: Žalgiris Arena; Attendance: 782; Referee: Daniel Rodríguez (Uruguay)

15 November 2021 UEFA Futsal Euro 2022 qualifying Play-offs	Serbia	3–1	Belarus	Jezero Hall, Kragujevac
18:00	Aleksić 6:26; Scherbich 17:36 (o.g.); Pršić 27:36	Report	Los 37:19	Referee: Eduardo Fernandes Coelho (Portugal), Miguel Castilho (Portugal)

17 November 2021 UEFA Futsal Euro 2022 qualifying Play-offs	Belarus	2–3 (3–6 agg.)	Serbia	Sport Palace Uruchie, Minsk
16:30	Selyuk 35:03; Krikun 39:33	Report	Tomić 11:34; Momčilović 16:06; Rakić 26:26	Referee: Ondřej Černý (Czech Republic), Jan Kresta (Czech Republic)

=== 2022 ===
19 January 2022 Euro 2022 Group A	Serbia	2–4	Portugal	Ziggo Dome, Amsterdam
	Pršić 1'03", 6'01"	Report	Pauleta 10'33"; Pany Varela 18'11"; Jesus 24'47"; Tomás Paçó 25'17"	Referee: Nikola Jelić (Croatia), Chiara Perona (Italy)

23 January 2022 Euro 2022 Group A	Serbia	1–6	Ukraine	Ziggo Dome, Amsterdam
14:30	Tomić 38'59"	Report	Zvarych 1'10", 33'54"; Vasić 5'51" (o.g.); Abakshyn 14'27", 19'12"; Korsun 38'40"	Referee: David Grøndal Nissen (Denmark), Gábor Kovács (Hungary)

28 January 2022 Euro 2022 Group A	Netherlands	2–3	Serbia	Ziggo Dome, Amsterdam
20:30	Martinus 2'08"; Rakić 22'31" (o.g.)	Report	Rajčević 26'23"; Ramić 31'35"; Stojcevski 32'05"	Referee: Chiara Perona (Italy), Nicola Manzione (Italy)

== Coaching staff ==
=== Manager history ===
Name	Period	Major Tournaments
Aca Kovačević	2007–2016	World Cup 2012, Euro 2007, Euro 2010, Euro 2012, Euro 2016
Goran Ivančić	2016–2021	Euro 2018
Dejan Majes	2021–	World Cup 2021, Euro 2022

== Players ==
=== Current squad ===
The following players were called up to the squad for the UEFA 2024 FIFA Futsal World Cup qualification matches against Poland and the Belgium on 15 and 20 September 2023, respectively.
Head coach: Dejan Maješ

No.	Pos.	Player	Date of birth (age)	Club
1	GK	Jakov Vulić	10 March 1992 (age 34)	(Football Association of Serbia) KMF Loznica-Grad
12	GK	Petar Nikolić	15 April 1991 (age 35)	(Football Association of Serbia) KMF Loznica-Grad
2	DF	Đorđe Rosić	17 December 2000 (age 25)	(Football Association of Serbia) KMF Loznica-Grad
4	DF	Nikola Matijević	26 December 1991 (age 34)	(Kuwait Football Association) Al-Arabi
5	DF	Kristijan Vasić	24 June 1999 (age 26)	(Football Association of Serbia) KMF Loznica-Grad
6	DF	Denis Ramić	17 November 1994 (age 31)	(Romanian Football Federation) CSM Deva
13	DF	Aleksandar Janjić	9 September 1995 (age 30)	(Football Association of Serbia) KMF Vranje
7	MF	Miloš Simić (captain)	12 August 1989 (age 36)	(Romanian Football Federation) CSM Deva
8	MF	Aleksandar Tomić	9 June 2002 (age 23)	(Hungarian Football Federation) SG Kecskemét
9	MF	Jovan Lazarević	11 September 1997 (age 28)	(Royal Spanish Football Federation) Inter Movistar
10	FW	Strahinja Petrov	14 December 1993 (age 32)	(Italian Football Federation) Ciampino Futsal
11	FW	Stefan Rakić	22 November 1993 (age 32)	(Polish Football Association) Rekord Bielsko-Biała
14	FW	Slobodan Rajčević	28 February 1985 (age 41)	(Football Association of Bosnia and Herzegovina) FC Mostar SG
15	FW	Lazar Marinković	24 May 2000 (age 26)	(Russian Football Union) MFK Torpedo
16	FW	Mateja Ćirka	11 June 2002 (age 23)	(Football Association of Serbia) KMF Novi Pazar

=== Recent call-ups ===
The following players have also been called up to the squad within the last 12 months.

Pos.	Player	Date of birth (age)	Caps	Goals	Club	Latest call-up
GK	Miodrag Aksentijević^{INJ}	6 July 1997 (age 28)			(Germany) TSV Weilimdorf	v. Poland, 15 September 2023
DF	Nemanja Milosavljević	20 July 1997 (age 28)			(Serbia) KMF Vranje	v. Norway, 9 November 2022
DF	Lazar Petrašević	10 July 1995 (age 30)			(Serbia) KMF FON Banjica	v. Norway, 5 October 2022
FW	Dragan Tomić^{INJ}	25 March 1991 (age 35)			(Belgium) Anderlecht	v. Poland, 15 September 2023
FW	Ninoslav Aleksić^{INJ}	3 February 1995 (age 31)			(Azerbaijan) Araz Naxçivan	v. Poland, 15 September 2023
FW	Marko Pršić	13 September 1990 (age 35)			(Kuwait) Al-Arabi	v. France, 7 March 2023
FW	Marko Avramović	1 April 1992 (age 34)			(Serbia) KMF Loznica-Grad	v. Norway, 9 November 2022
FW	Uroš Krasnić	8 May 1993 (age 33)			(Serbia) Bečej 2003	v. France, 12 October 2022
^{COV} Player withdrew from the squad due to contracting COVID-19.^{INJ} Player withdrew from the squad due to an injury.^{PRE} Preliminary squad.^{RET} Retired from international futsal.

== Competitive record ==
=== FIFA Futsal World Cup ===
FIFA Futsal World Cup record
Year	Round	Pld	W	D	L	GS	GA
as Part of Yugoslavia
(Netherlands) 1989	did not invited to participate to the tournament						
(Hong Kong) 1992	qualified ^{1}						
as Serbia
(Spain) 1996	did not qualify						
(Guatemala) 2000	did not qualify						
(Chinese Taipei) 2004	did not qualify						
(Brazil) 2008	did not qualify						
(Thailand) 2012	Round of 16	4	2	1	1	13	7
(Colombia) 2016	did not qualify						
(Lithuania) 2021	Round of 16	4	1	0	3	14	11
(Uzbekistan) 2024	did not qualify						
Total	2/10	8	3	1	4	27	18

Remarks:

^{1} Qualified for the tournament, but was ejected due to the Yugoslav Wars.

=== UEFA Futsal Championship ===
UEFA Futsal Championship record
Year	Round	Pld	W	D	L	GS	GA
(Spain) 1996	did not qualify						
(Spain) 1999	Group stage	3	0	1	2	5	10
(Russia) 2001	did not qualify						
(Italy) 2003	did not qualify						
(Czech Republic) 2005	did not qualify						
(Portugal) 2007	Group stage	3	1	1	1	7	8
(Hungary) 2010	Quarter-finals	3	2	0	1	7	8
(Croatia) 2012	Quarter-finals	3	1	0	2	11	12
(Belgium) 2014	did not qualify						
(Serbia) 2016	Fourth place	5	3	1	1	14	10
(Slovenia) 2018	Quarter-finals	3	0	2	1	4	6
(Netherlands) 2022	Group stage	3	1	0	2	6	12
(Latvia) (Lithuania) (Slovenia) 2026	did not qualify						
Total	7/13	23	8	5	10	54	66

=== Grand Prix de Futsal ===
Grand Prix de Futsal record
Year	Round	Pld	W	D	L	GS	GA
(Brazil) 2005	did not enter						
(Brazil) 2006	did not enter						
(Brazil) 2007	did not enter						
(Brazil) 2008	5th place	6	4	0	2	21	13
(Brazil) 2009	did not enter						
(Brazil) 2010	did not enter						
(Brazil) 2011	did not enter						
(Brazil) 2013	7th place	4	1	0	3	15	17
(Brazil) 2014	did not enter						
(Brazil) 2015	did not enter						
(Brazil) 2018	did not enter						
Total	2/11	10	5	0	5	36	30
