= Ukraine national futsal team =

National sports team

Ukraine
- Shirt badge/Association crest
- Nickname(s): The Team (Збірна); Yellow-Blue (Жовто-Сині)Zhovto-Blakytni ("the Yellow-Blues")
- Association: Football Federation of Ukraine
- Confederation: UEFA (Europe)
- FIFA code: UKR
- FIFA ranking: 9 (24 September 2026)
- Highest FIFA ranking: 8 (December 2025)
- Lowest FIFA ranking: 12 (May 2024)
| Home colours | Away colours |

First international
- Belarus 1–2 Ukraine (Minsk, Belarus; 5 June 1994)

Biggest win
- Ukraine 20–1 Armenia (Litija, Slovenia; 17 February 2000)

Biggest defeat
- Brazil 16–0 Ukraine (Rio de Janeiro, Brazil; 13 December 1998)

FIFA World Cup
- Appearances: 6 (First in 1996)
- Best result: (bronze) Third Place (2024)

AMF World Cup
- Appearances: 1 (First in 2003)
- Best result: 1st round (2003)

European Championship
- Appearances: 11 (First in 1996)
- Best result: (silver) 2nd place (2001, 2003)

Grand Prix de Futsal
- Appearances: 2 (First in 2008)
- Best result: (bronze) 3rd place, (2008)

The Ukraine national futsal team represents Ukraine in international futsal competitions such as the FIFA Futsal World Cup and the European Championships and is controlled by the Football Federation of Ukraine.

== History ==
In the 2008 FIFA Futsal World Cup qualification stage Ukraine finished top of Group 10 ahead of Israel, Moldova and Bulgaria. In the knockout stage of the qualification process, they advanced after beating Hungary 6:5 on aggregate (3:1 home, 3:4 away). The last stage of the 2008 FIFA Futsal World Cup took place from 30 September 2008 till 19 October 2008 in Rio, Brazil and was the largest ever edition of the tournament at the time containing 20 teams. Ukraine has history in the tournament, having a fourth-place finish in 1996 and a top eight finish in 2004, 2008 and 2012.

== Tournament records ==
=== FIFA Futsal World Cup ===
| FIFA Futsal World Cup Record | | | | | | | | | | Qualification | | | | | | | |
| Year | Round | Rank | M | W | D | L | GF | GA | GD | M | W | D | L | GF | GA | GD | Link |
| as Part of Soviet Union | | | | | | | | | | as Part of Soviet Union | | | | | | | |
|---|---|---|---|---|---|---|---|---|---|---|---|---|---|---|---|---|---|
| (Netherlands) 1989 | Did not invited to participate to the tournament | | | | | | | | | Did not invited to participate to the tournament | | | | | | | |
| as Ukraine | | | | | | | | | | as Ukraine | | | | | | | |
| (Hong Kong) 1992 | Did not invited to participate to the tournament | | | | | | | | | Did not invited to participate to the tournament | | | | | | | |
| (Spain) 1996 | Third place match | Fourth place | 8 | 3 | 2 | 3 | 36 | 25 | +11 | 3 | 1 | 0 | 2 | 9 | 12 | -3 | |
| (Guatemala) 2000 | Did not qualify | | | | | | | | | 5 | 4 | 0 | 1 | 40 | 5 | +35 | |
| (Taiwan) 2004 | Second round | 6th | 6 | 3 | 1 | 2 | 16 | 15 | +1 | 4 | 4 | 0 | 0 | 16 | 4 | +12 | |
| (Brazil) 2008 | Second round | 8th | 7 | 3 | 1 | 3 | 24 | 21 | +3 | 5 | 4 | 0 | 1 | 20 | 8 | +12 | |
| (Thailand) 2012 | Quarter-finals | 5th | 5 | 3 | 1 | 1 | 21 | 13 | +8 | 5 | 3 | 0 | 2 | 13 | 10 | +3 | |
| (Colombia) 2016 | Round of 16 | 13th | 4 | 2 | 0 | 2 | 8 | 7 | +1 | 5 | 5 | 0 | 0 | 29 | 6 | +23 | |
| (Lithuania) 2021 | Did not qualify | | | | | | | | | 6 | 2 | 2 | 2 | 19 | 14 | +5 | |
| (Uzbekistan) 2024 | Third place match | Third place | 7 | 5 | 0 | 2 | 33 | 19 | +24 | 4 | 3 | 1 | 0 | 13 | 6 | +7 | |
| 2028 | TBD | | | | | | | | | 1 | 1 | 0 | 0 | 9 | 2 | +7 | |
| Total:6/10 | Third place match | Third place | 37 | 19 | 5 | 13 | 138 | 100 | +38 | 38 | 27 | 3 | 8 | 168 | 67 | +102 | – |

=== UEFA European Futsal Championship ===
UEFA European Futsal Championship Record
| Year | Round | Rank | M | W | D | L | GS | GA |
|---|---|---|---|---|---|---|---|---|
| (Spain) 1996 | Fifth-place play-off | 5th | 3 | 0 | 1 | 2 | 9 | 12 |
| (Spain) 1999 | Did not qualify | | | | | | | |
| (Russia) 2001 | Final | Runners-up | 5 | 2 | 2 | 1 | 18 | 12 |
| (Italy) 2003 | Final | Runners-up | 5 | 3 | 0 | 2 | 19 | 11 |
| (Czech Republic) 2005 | Third place match | Fourth Place | 5 | 2 | 0 | 3 | 8 | 12 |
| (Portugal) 2007 | Group stage | 7th | 3 | 0 | 0 | 3 | 5 | 13 |
| (Hungary) 2010 | Quarter-finals | 5th | 3 | 1 | 1 | 1 | 9 | 9 |
| (Croatia) 2012 | Quarter-finals | 8th | 3 | 1 | 1 | 1 | 8 | 8 |
| (Belgium) 2014 | Quarter-finals | 5th | 3 | 1 | 1 | 1 | 2 | 2 |
| (Serbia) 2016 | Quarter-finals | 6th | 3 | 1 | 0 | 2 | 8 | 9 |
| (Slovenia) 2018 | Quarter-finals | 5th | 3 | 1 | 0 | 2 | 6 | 8 |
| (Netherlands) 2022 | Third place match | Fourth Place | 6 | 2 | 0 | 4 | 19 | 13 |
| (Latvia) (Lithuania) (Slovenia) 2026 | Quarter-finals | 6th | 4 | 2 | 0 | 2 | 12 | 10 |
| Total:11/13 | Final | Runners-up | 46 | 16 | 6 | 24 | 123 | 119 |

=== Grand Prix de Futsal ===
Grand Prix de Futsal Record
| Year | Round | Pld | W | D | L | GS | GA |
|---|---|---|---|---|---|---|---|
| Brazil 2005 | did not enter | | | | | | |
| Brazil 2006 | did not enter | | | | | | |
| Brazil 2007 | did not enter | | | | | | |
| Brazil 2008 | 3rd place | 6 | 4 | 1 | 1 | 25 | 13 |
| Brazil 2009 | 6th place | 6 | 2 | 3 | 1 | 13 | 9 |
| Brazil 2010 | did not enter | | | | | | |
| Brazil 2011 | did not enter | | | | | | |
| Brazil 2013 | did not enter | | | | | | |
| Brazil 2014 | did not enter | | | | | | |
| Brazil 2015 | did not enter | | | | | | |
| Brazil 2016 | did not enter | | | | | | |
| Total | 2/11 | 12 | 6 | 4 | 2 | 38 | 22 |

== Players ==
=== Current squad ===
The following players were called up to the squad for the UEFA Futsal Euro 2022.
Head coach: Oleksandr Kosenko

| No. | Pos. | Player | Date of birth (age) | Caps | Goals | Club |
|---|---|---|---|---|---|---|
| 1 | GK | Kyrylo Tsypun | 30 July 1987 (age 39) | | | (Ukrainian Association of Football) MFC Prodexim Kherson |
| 2 | GK | Oleksandr Sukhov | 8 June 1997 (age 29) | | | (Ukrainian Association of Football) MFC HIT Kyiv |
| | GK | Nazarii-Zenovii Voitovych | 5 July 1998 (age 28) | | | (Ukrainian Association of Football) Energia Lviv |
| 3 | DF | Serhii Malyshko | 4 October 1994 (age 32) | | | (Football Federation of Belarus) MFC Stalitsa Minsk |
| 4 | DF | Oleh Yeromin | 20 December 1992 (age 33) | | | (Football Federation of Belarus) Viten |
| 6 | FW | Mykola Mykytiuk | 13 September 1996 (age 30) | | | (Ukrainian Association of Football) Uragan Ivano-Frankivsk |
| 7 | DF | Mykola Grytsyna | 3 June 1989 (age 37) | | | (Football Federation of Belarus) MFC Stalitsa Minsk |
| | FW | Mykhailo Grytsyna | 19 October 1991 (age 35) | | | (Football Federation of Belarus) MFC Stalitsa Minsk |
| 10 | FW | Serhiy Zhurba | 14 March 1987 (age 39) | | | (Ukrainian Association of Football) MFC HIT Kyiv |
| 11 | FW | Artem Fareniuk | 9 November 1992 (age 33) | | | (Ukrainian Association of Football) Uragan Ivano-Frankivsk |
| 13 | DF | Ihor Korsun | 15 June 1993 (age 33) | | | (Ukrainian Association of Football) MFC Prodexim Kherson |
| 14 | FW | Petro Shoturma | 27 June 1992 (age 34) | | | (Ukrainian Association of Football) MFC Prodexim Kherson |
| 16 | FW | Oleksandr Pediash | 4 March 1994 (age 32) | | | (Ukrainian Association of Football) MFC HIT Kyiv |
| 18 | DF | Taras Kuz | 18 January 1987 (age 39) | | | (Ukrainian Association of Football) Energia Lviv |
| 19 | DF | Mykhailo Zvarych | 23 November 1992 (age 33) | | | (Ukrainian Association of Football) MFC Prodexim Kherson |

=== Recent call-ups ===
The following players have been called up for the team within the last 12 months.

| Pos. | Player | Date of birth (age) | Caps | Goals | Club | Latest call-up |
|---|---|---|---|---|---|---|
| GK | Yuriy Savenko | 21 January 1992 (age 34) | | | (Ukraine) MFC Prodexim Kherson | v. Albania, 31 January 2021 |
| DF | Taras Korolyshyn | 18 February 1993 (age 33) | | | (Belarus) MFC Stalitsa Minsk | v. Albania, 31 January 2021 |
| DF | Mykola Bilotserkivets | 5 December 1986 (age 39) | | | (Ukraine) MFC Prodexim Kherson | v. Albania, 31 January 2021 |

== Head coaches ==
- Gennadiy Lisenchuk – from 1994 till 2012
- Yevgen Ryvkin – from 9 January 2013

== Results and fixtures ==
=== 2021 ===
| 31 January 2021 Euro 2022 qualifying | Albania | 3–10 | Ukraine | Hall Tirana Olimpik Park, Tirana |
| 18:00 | Mejzini 9', Brahimi 13', Karaj 34' | Report | Zvarych 1', 14', 27', Shoturma 6', Bilotserkivets 14', Fareniuk 19', 26', Grytsyna 23', Yeromin 36', Malyshko 40' | Referee: Ozan Soykan (Turkey) |

| 3 March 2021 Euro 2022 qualifying | Croatia | 3-2 | Ukraine |
| 19:30 |

| 7 March 2021 Euro 2022 qualifying | Ukraine | 2-7 | Croatia |
| TBC |

| 7 April 2021 Euro 2022 qualifying | Denmark | 2-6 | Ukraine |
| TBC |

| 11 April 2021 Euro 2022 qualifying | Ukraine | 8-2 | Albania |
| TBC |

=== 2020 ===
| 1 February 2020 WC 2020 qualifying | Serbia | 5–2 | Ukraine | Sportska hala "Čair", Niš |
| 17:30 | Pršić 12', Petrov 15', Pršić 22', Tomić 30', Rakić 31' | Report | Fareniuk 30', Korsun 39' |

| 2 February 2020 WC 2020 qualifying | Ukraine | 1–3 | Spain | Sportska hala "Čair", Niš |
| 21:30 | Malyshko 31' | Report | Ortiz 40' (pen.), Lozano 19' (pen.), Lozano 33' |

| 4 February 2020 WC 2020 qualifying | France | 2–2 | Ukraine | Sportska hala "Čair", Niš |
| 17:30 | Mouhoudine 10', Ramirez 13' (pen.), | Report | Zhurba 7', Pediash 29' |

| 9 November 2020 Friendly | Hungary | 1–2 | Ukraine | Debreceni Egyetemi Sportaréna, Debrecen |
| 20:00 | Nagy 4' | Report | Zvarych 6', Grytsyna 34' |

| 10 November 2020 Friendly | Hungary | 3–4 | Ukraine | Debreceni Egyetemi Sportaréna, Debrecen |
| 14:00 | Dróth 3', 14', Dávid 28' | Report | Bilotserkivets 1', 23', Zvarych 22', 33' |

| 8 December 2020 Friendly | Ukraine | 4–1 | Moldova | Yunist Sport Hall, Zaporizhzhia |
| 14:00 | Shoturma 5', 20', Kuz 24', Fareniuk 26' | Report | Nikolaychuk 35' |

| 9 December 2020 Friendly | Ukraine | 8–0 | Moldova | Yunist Sport Hall, Zaporizhzhia |
| 14:00 | Zvarych 6', 12', Korsun 10', Kuz 24', Fareniuk 11', 15', Savenko 26', Kuz 34', 40' | Report |

=== 2014 ===
| 30 January 2014 Euro 2014 | Romania | 0–1 | Ukraine | Lotto Arena, Antwerp |
| 18:30 | | Report | Sorokin 17' | Referee: Ondřej Černý (Czech Republic) |

| 1 February 2014 Euro 2014 | Ukraine | 0–0 | Belgium | Lotto Arena, Antwerp |
| 20:45 | | Report | | Referee: Saša Tomić (Croatia) |

| 3 February 2014 Euro 2014 | Ukraine | 1–2 | Portugal | Sportpaleis, Antwerp |
| 18:00 | Valenko 13' | Report | Cardinal 3', 23' | Referee: Balázs Farkas (Hungary) |
