= Lithuanian Football Federation =

Governing body for association football in Lithuania

UEFA
- Short name: LFF
- Founded: 1922; 104 years ago
- Headquarters: Kaunas
- FIFA affiliation: 1923
- UEFA affiliation: 1992
- President: Edgaras Stankevičius
- Website: www.lff.lt

The Lithuanian Football Federation (LFF; Lithuanian: Lietuvos futbolo federacija) is the governing body of football in Lithuania. The Federation is responsible for football development in the nation and its national teams, including the Lithuania national football team. It is based in Vilnius. LFF became a member of FIFA in 1923, but following Lithuania's annexation by the Soviet Union it was disbanded. It became a member again in 1992 after Lithuania regained its independence. The top division is A Lyga.

When one French journalist saw a full basketball arena (where "Lietuvos Rytas" fought in ULEB cup semifinals) close to an empty stadium (where a Baltic Football League match took place) he published an article that Lithuania is a land where the beautiful game has to live in basketball's shadow.

In reality, the popularity of football is on the rise and the very few games that are on par in terms of quality with the ULEB cup semifinals also attract full stadiums as well as a TV following. This craze is mostly imported from other European nations, such as England, where many Lithuanians emigrated since the country has joined the European Union in 2004.

However, unlike basketball, Lithuanian football is relatively weak. The national team has never qualified for the European Championships or World Cup. In football, the element of luck is bigger than in basketball, therefore there were times when the Lithuanians scored draw against major teams such as Germany, Italy or Spain. However, defeats to the likes of the Faroe Islands or Liechtenstein soon afterward dash the hopes of Lithuanian fans and decrease the popularity of football.

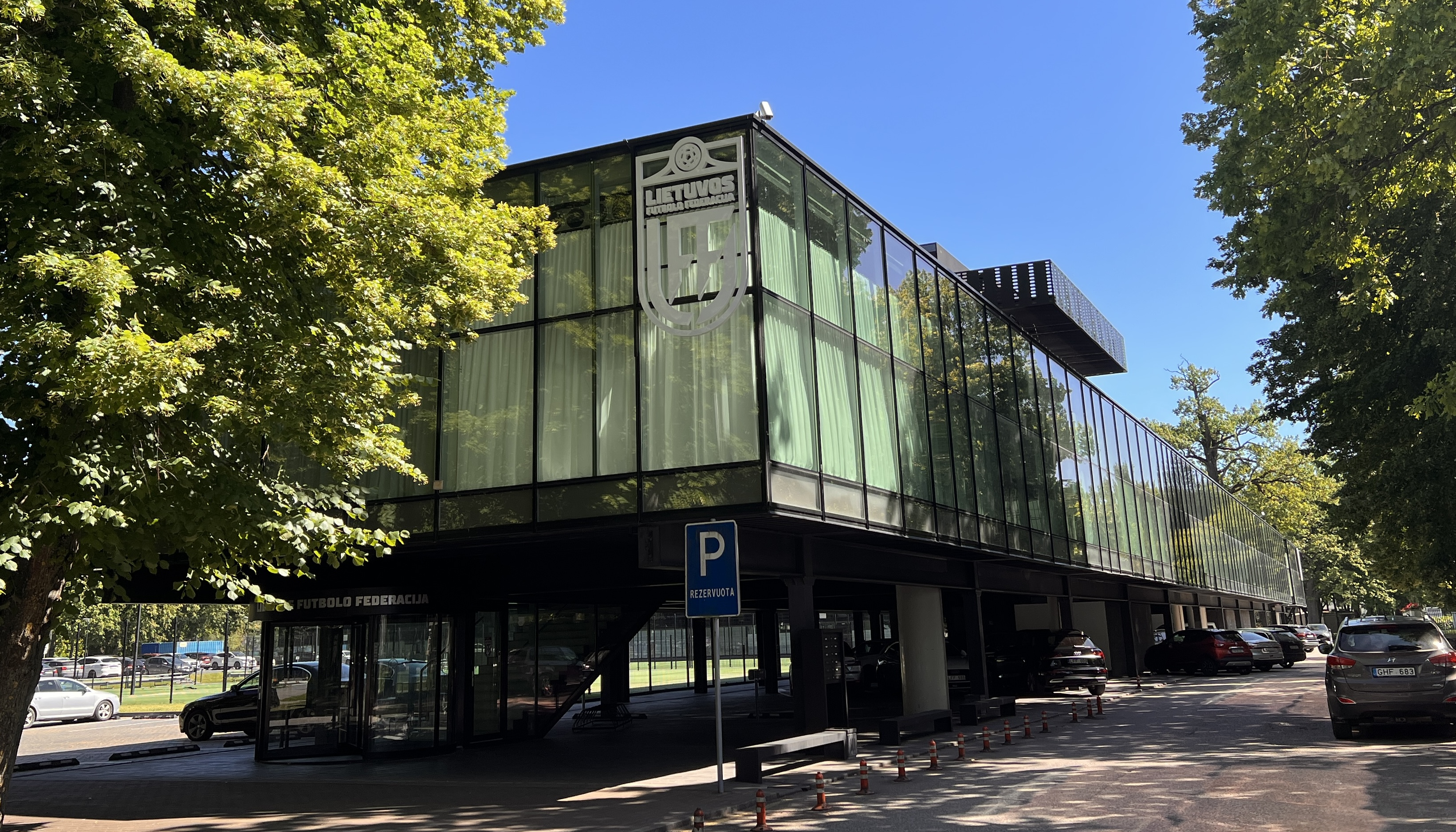
Headquarter of the LFF in Kaunas, located in close proximity to the Darius and Girėnas Stadium.

Football clubs of Lithuania attract less funding than their basketball counterparts and so they are weak, relying on Lithuanian players and foreigners who did not manage to get a hold into their national leagues. Not a single Lithuanian team ever took part in the main stages of the Champions’ League or the UEFA Cup until 2022. Moreover, the Lithuanian national football league is frequently dipped into scandals of betting fraud. Panevėžio Ekranas from Panevėžys long dominated this league in the early 2010s, amassing a yearly budget of 2 million Euros. FBK Kaunas used to prevail in the 1990s and 2000s (both the Kaunas and Panevėžys teams were eventually expelled from the league in 2009 and 2015 respectively, because of debts and controversies). FK Zalgiris Vilnius was the best Lithuanian team in the 1980s and still has a larger fan base than other Lithuanian football clubs. It has recently returned to prominence, dominating the league once again in the 2010s.

The national futsal team have taken part in both FIFA Futsal World Cup and UEFA Futsal Euro.

Their first appearance team was in 2021 as the host and will do the same for the UEFA Futsal Euro 2026 also as host alongside Latvia.
