= Boyis =

Spanish futsal player (born 1989)

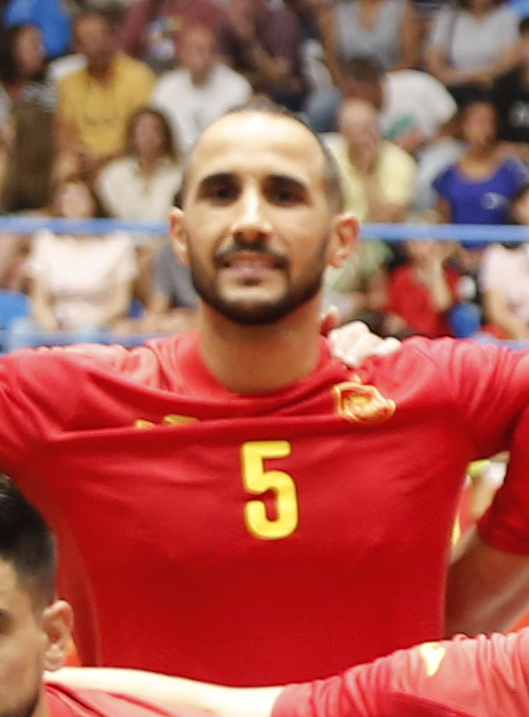

Personal information
- Full name: Antonio Manuel Sánchez Tienda
- Date of birth: 26 December 1989 (age 36)
- Place of birth: Doña MencíaCordoba, Spain
- Position: Defender

Team information
- Current team: Viña Albali Valdepeñas
- Number: 15

Senior career*
Years	Team	Apps	(Gls)
2010–2012	Ategua		
2012–2015	Jumilla		
2015–2018	Jaén		
2018–2020	FC Barcelona		
2020–2022	Inter		
2022–	Viña Albali Valdepeñas		

International career
2018–	Spain		
Medal record
UEFA Futsal Championship
Bronze medal – third place	2022 Netherlands
- * Club domestic league appearances and goals

Antonio Manuel Sánchez Tienda (born 26 December 1989), commonly known as Boyis, is a Spanish futsal player who plays for Viña Albali Valdepeñas and the Spanish national futsal team.

== Club career ==
Boyis' career began at Ategua, a small club in Castro del Río, and continued at Jumilla and then Jaén. In the three years he played with the Andalusians, he established himself as one of the best footballers in the Primera División, so much so that he was elected best defender of the 2017–18 season. In the same season he won his first national trophy, the Copa de España, and contributed to Jaén reaching the semi-finals of the play-offs for the title. The following summer he moved to FC Barcelona, with whom he won a championship and two Copas de España.

== International career ==
Boyis made his debut for the Spain national futsal team on 24 September 2018 in a 10–1 friendly win against Denmark. On 28 December 2021, he was included in the Spanish squad for the UEFA Futsal Euro 2022.

== Honours ==
Jaén

- Copa de España: 2017–18

FC Barcelona

- Primera División: 2018–19
- Copa de España: 2018–19, 2019–20
- Copa del Rey: 2018–19, 2019–20
- Supercopa de España: 2019

Inter

- Copa de España: 2020–21
- Copa del Rey: 2020–21
- Supercopa de España: 2020

Spain

- UEFA Futsal Championship third place: 2022
