= Edmilson Kutchy =

Portuguese futsal player

Personal information
- Full name: Edmilson Camala Sá
- Date of birth: 12 October 2002 (age 24)
- Place of birth: Lisbon, Portugal
- Height: 1.70 m (5 ft 7 in)
- Position: Winger

Youth career
- 2011–2012: Arroja
- 2012–2013: Sporting CP
- 2013–2020: Benfica

Senior career*
Years	Team	Apps	(Gls)
2020–	Benfica	35	(10)
2020–2021	→ Torreense (loan)	10	(4)
2021–2023	→ Fundão (loan)	53	(18)

International career
2020–2021	Portugal U19	23	(11)
2022	Portugal U21	4	(2)
2023–	Portugal	18	(4)
Medal record
Men's futsal
Representing Portugal
UEFA Futsal Championship
Runner-up	2026 Latvia / Lithuania / Slovenia
- * Club domestic league appearances and goals as of 15 September 2024

Edmilson Camala Sá (born 12 October 2002), better known by the nickname Kutchy, is a Portuguese professional futsal player who plays as a winger.

== Career ==
Born in Lisbon, Portugal, Kutchy has played futsal since he was 9 years old. He started his career at ASCD Arroja and had a spell with Sporting CP, but spent most of his youth at SL Benfica, where he turned professional during the 2020–21 season. He was loaned to the Torreense and AD Fundão teams to gain experience, and since October 2023 he has been part of Benfica's first team.

He had outstanding performances for the youth teams and since 2023 he has been part of the Portugal futsal team, being called up for the 2024 FIFA Futsal World Cup.

== Personal life ==
Kutchy contracted COVID-19 in 2020, ending up being hospitalized for two weeks.

== Honours ==
Benfica

- Liga Portuguesa: 2024–25, 2025–26
- Taça de Portugal de Futsal: 2025–26
- Taça da Liga de Futsal: 2025–26
- Supertaça de Futsal: 2023
- Campeonato Nacional Futsal Juniores B: 2018–19
