= Miguel Ángel Mellado =

Spanish futsal player (born 1999)

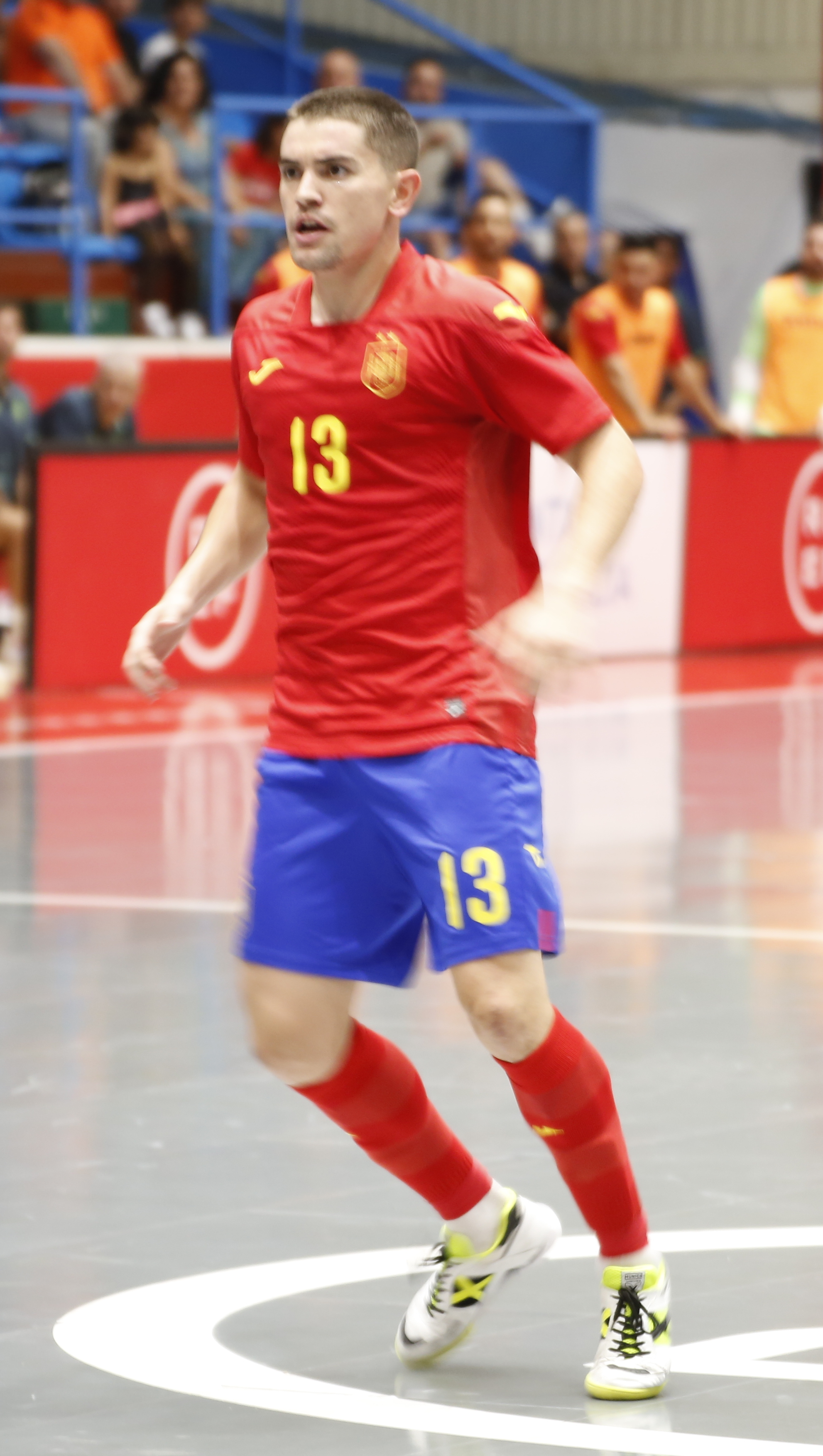

Personal information
- Full name: Miguel Ángel Cano Mellado
- Date of birth: 23 July 1999 (age 27)
- Place of birth: Blanca, Spain
- Position: Defender

Team information
- Current team: Jimbee Cartagena
- Number: 13

Senior career*
Years	Team	Apps	(Gls)
2017–2018	Librilla		
2018–	Jimbee Cartagena		

International career^{‡}
2020–	Spain		
Medal record
Men's futsal
Representing Spain
UEFA Futsal Championship
Winner	2026 Latvia / Lithuania / Slovenia
Bronze medal – third place	2022 Netherlands
- * Club domestic league appearances and goals as of 30 December 2025 ‡ National team caps and goals as of 19 August 2025

Miguel Ángel Cano Mellado (born 23 July 1999), also known mononymously as Mellado, is a Spanish professional futsal player who plays as a defender for Jimbee Cartagena and the Spain national team.

== Club career ==
Originally from Blanca, Mellado began in the youth sector of ElPozo Murcia. Following a serious injury, he then moved to that of the modest Librilla. In the 2017-18 season he was added to the first team with which he made his debut in the Spanish third division.

In the summer of 2018, Mellado was purchased by Cartagena as a reinforcement for their youth team. However, the qualities and personality of the defender immediately convinced the coach Juan Giménez to employ him permanently in the first team, playing in the Primera División. In the following seasons Mellado's performances improved to such an extent that he earned the recognition of "revelation player" of the 2020-21 season and established himself as one of the best defenders in the Spanish championship.

== International career ==
On 5 November 2020, Mellado made his debut for the Spain national team during a 2-1 friendly win against Brazil. On 30 August 2021, he was included in the final list of players called up for the 2021 World Cup, which Spain reached the quarter-finals. On 28 December 2021, he was included in the list of players called up for the UEFA Futsal Euro 2022.

Four years later, Mellado was part of the Spanish team that won its eighth continental title at the UEFA Futsal Euro in which he was included in the team of the tournament.

== Honours ==
Cartagena

- Primera División: 2023–24, 2024–25
- Supercopa de España: 2024, 2025, 2026

Spain

- UEFA Futsal Championship: 2026; third-place: 2022

Individual

- UEFA Futsal Championship Team of the Tournament: 2026
