= UEFA Under-21 Futsal Tournament =

- Organiser(s): UEFA
- Founded: 2008
- Abolished: 2008
- Region: Europe
- Teams: 8
- Last champions: Russia (1st title)
- Most championships: Russia (1 title)

The UEFA European Under-21 Futsal Tournament was a futsal competition organised by UEFA. As of 2025, only one edition of the competition has ever been played. The 2008 tournament was hosted and won by Russia who defeated Italy 5–4 in the final.

== Results ==
Year	Host	Final			
Year	Host	Winner	Score	Runner-up	Losing semi-finalists
2008	Russia	Russia	5–4 (a.e.t.)	Italy	Spain and Ukraine

== See also ==
- UEFA Futsal Championship
