= Miodrag Aksentijević =

Serbian futsal player

Personal information
- Full name: Miodrag Aksentijević
- Date of birth: 22 July 1983 (age 43)
- Place of birth: Niš, SFR Yugoslavia
- Height: 1.85 m (6 ft 1 in)
- Position: Goalkeeper

Team information
- Current team: Tyumen
- Number: 1

Senior career*
Years	Team	Apps	(Gls)
- Pro-Al
- Koska
- → Pro-Al
- Ekonomac
- Tulpar
2015–	Tyumen		

International career^{‡}
- Serbia
- * Club domestic league appearances and goals as of 17-10-2016 ‡ National team caps and goals as of 17-10-2016

Miodrag Aksentijević (Serbian Cyrillic: Миодраг Аксентијевић, born 22 July 1983), is a Serbian futsal player who plays for Tyumen and the Serbia national futsal team. He also represented Serbia national futsal team at UEFA Futsal Euro 2016 in Serbia and 2012 FIFA Futsal World Cup in Thailand.
