= Armenia national futsal team =

Armenia
- Nickname(s): Հավաքական Havakakan (Collective team)
- Association: Football Federation of Armenia
- Confederation: UEFA (Europe)
- Head coach: (Armenia) Ruben Nazaretyan
- FIFA code: ARM
- FIFA ranking: 16 ▼1 (24 September 2026)
Home colours	Away colours

First international
- Spain 17–1 Armenia (Ljubljana, Slovenia; 14 February 2000)

Biggest win
- Armenia 11–0 Scotland (Varna, Bulgaria; 08 April 2022)

Biggest defeat
- Ukraine 20–1 Armenia (Litija, Slovenia; 17 February 2000)

FIFA World Cup
- Appearances: 0

AMF World Cup
- Appearances: 1 (First in 1994)
- Best result: First round, (1994) (forfeited)

UEFA Futsal Championship
- Appearances: 1 (First in 2026)

The Armenia national futsal team (Armenian: Հայաստանի ֆուտզալի ազգային հավաքական) is managed by the Football Federation of Armenia, the governing body for futsal in Armenia and represents the country in international futsal competitions, such as the World Cup and the European Championships.

== Competition history ==
=== FIFA Futsal World Cup ===
FIFA Futsal World Cup record								Qualification record						
Year	Round	Pld	W	D	L	GF	GA	Outcome	Pld	W	D	L	GF	GA
(Netherlands) 1989	Part of Soviet Union							-	-	-	-	-	-	-
(Hong Kong) 1992	Did not enter							-	-	-	-	-	-	-
(Spain) 1996	Did not enter							-	-	-	-	-	-	-
(Guatemala) 2000	Did not qualify							Group B 5th place	5	1	0	4	9	58
(Chinese Taipei) 2004	Did not qualify							Group 8 3rd place	2	0	0	2	4	14
(Brazil) 2008	Did not qualify							Group 6 4th place	3	0	0	3	1	12
(Thailand) 2012	Did not qualify							Group A 3rd place	3	1	2	0	8	4
(Colombia) 2016	Did not qualify							Group D 4th place	3	0	0	3	6	9
(Lithuania) 2021	Did not qualify							Group E 3rd place	3	1	0	2	6	10
(Uzbekistan) 2024	Did not qualify							Group E 4th place	9	5	0	4	27	27
Total	0/10	0	0	0	0	0	0	7/10	28	8	2	18	61	134

=== UEFA Futsal Championship ===
UEFA Futsal Euro record								Qualification record						
Year	Round	Pld	W	D	L	GF	GA	Outcome	Pld	W	D	L	GF	GA
(Spain) 1996	Did not enter							-	-	-	-	-	-	-
(Spain) 1999	Did not enter							-	-	-	-	-	-	-
(Russia) 2001	Did not enter							-	-	-	-	-	-	-
(Italy) 2003	Did not qualify							Group D 4th place	3	0	0	3	5	13
(Czech Republic) 2005	Did not qualify							Group A Runners-up	3	1	2	0	9	7
(Portugal) 2007	Did not qualify							Group A 3rd place	3	1	0	2	10	13
(Hungary) 2010	Did not qualify							Group B 3rd place	3	1	1	1	10	14
(Croatia) 2012	Did not qualify							Group B 4th place	3	0	1	2	4	10
(Belgium) 2014	Did not qualify							Group D Runners-up	3	1	1	1	4	7
(Serbia) 2016	Did not qualify							Group 6 4th place	6	2	1	3	16	28
(Slovenia) 2018	Did not qualify							Group C Runners-up	3	2	0	1	11	8
(Netherlands) 2022	Did not qualify							Group 2 4th place	11	3	2	6	23	37
(Latvia) (Lithuania) (Slovenia) 2026	Quarter-finals	4	2	1	1	10	11	Group 6 winners	Qualified					
Total:1/13	Quarter-finals	4	2	1	1	10	11	9/13	38	11	8	19	92	137

== Players ==
=== Current squad ===
The following players were called up to the squad for the UEFA Futsal Euro 2026 tournament. Head coach: Ruben Nazaretyan

No.	Pos.	Player	Date of birth (age)	Caps	Club
16	GK	Albert Agadzhanov	5 February 1994 (age 32)		(Russia) MFK TZMS
2	GK	Emin Gharabekians	19 January 1991 (age 35)		(Armenia) Yerevan FC
3	DF	Gamlet Manukian	4 April 1991 (age 35)		(Armenia) Unisport
5	DF	Mikael Gandilian	24 March 1993 (age 33)		(Russia) FK IrAero
9	DF	Sargis Margaryan	7 September 1993 (age 33)		(Belarus) Viten Orsha
13	DF	Artur Melkonyan	29 October 1991 (age 34)		(Russia) MFK LKS
6	FW	Nikita Khromykh	27 March 1995 (age 31)		(Russia) MFK Torpedo
7	FW	Vladimir Sanosyan (captain)	29 April 1996 (age 30)		(Russia) MFK Norilsk Nickel
11	FW	Garegin Mashumyan	1 September 1989 (age 37)		(Armenia) Yerevan FC
23	FW	Arsen Petrosov	6 May 2006 (age 20)		(Russia) MFK Torpedo
10	FW	Rafik Melikyan	31 March 1999 (age 27)		(Armenia) Yerevan FC
19	FW	Mihran Dermenjyan	18 August 1997 (age 29)		(Armenia) Yerevan FC
8	FW	Denis Nevedrov	6 April 1994 (age 32)		(Russia) MFK Tyumen
18	FW	Aghasi Yeghiazaryan	3 January 2006 (age 20)		(Armenia) Yerevan FC
18	FW	Arseni Petrosyan	14 June 2003 (age 23)		(Armenia) Yerevan FC

=== Recent call-ups ===
The following players have also been called up to the squad within the last 12 months.

Pos.	Player	Date of birth (age)	Caps	Goals	Club	Latest call-up
^{COV} Player withdrew from the squad due to contracting COVID-19.^{INJ} Player withdrew from the squad due to an injury.^{PRE} Preliminary squad.^{RET} Retired from international futsal.

== See also ==
- Armenian Futsal Premier League
- Football in Armenia
- Sport in Armenia
