= Slobodan Rajčević =

Serbian futsal player

Rajčević
Personal information
- Full name: Slobodan Rajčević
- Date of birth: 28 February 1985 (age 41)
- Place of birth: Zrenjanin, SFR Yugoslavia
- Position: Defender

Team information
- Current team: F.C. Nacional

Senior career*
| Years | Team | Apps | (Gls) |
- KMF SAS Zrenjanin
- KMF Ekonomac Kragujevac
- “Fənər”

International career
- Serbia
- * Club domestic league appearances and goals

Slobodan Rajčević (Serbian: Слободан Рајчевић; born 28 February 1985) in Zrenjanin in Serbia, is a Serbian futsal player who plays for Al Mayadeen Futsal Team and the Serbia national futsal team.
