= Tomás Paçó =

Portuguese futsal player

Personal information
- Full name: Tomás Eduardo Carriço Paçó
- Date of birth: 19 April 2000 (age 26)
- Place of birth: Lisbon, Portugal
- Height: 1.79 m (5 ft 10 in)
- Position: Defender

Team information
- Current team: Sporting CP
- Number: 4

Youth career
- 2008–2011: GROB
- 2011–2020: Sporting CP

Senior career*
| Years | Team | Apps | (Gls) |
| 2019– | Sporting CP | 51 | (10) |

International career^{‡}
| 2017 | Portugal U17 | 8 | (4) |
| 2017–2018 | Portugal U18 | 8 | (6) |
| 2019 | Portugal U19 | 15 | (9) |
| 2019–2020 | Portugal U21 | 5 | (0) |
| 2021– | Portugal | 18 | (2) |
Medal record
Men's futsal
Representing Portugal
UEFA Futsal Championship
| Runner-up | 2026 Latvia / Lithuania / Slovenia |
- * Club domestic league appearances and goals as of 00:00, 29 January 2022 (UTC) ‡ National team caps and goals as of 00:00, 29 January 2022 (UTC)

Tomás Eduardo Carriço Paçó (born 19 April 2000) is a Portuguese futsal player who plays as a defender for Sporting CP and the Portugal national team. Tomás Paçó has a twin brother, Bernardo, who is a professional futsal goalkeeper.

== Honours ==
Sporting

- Liga Portuguesa: 2020–21, 2021–22, 2022–23, 2023–24
- Taça de Portugal: 2019–20, 2021–22, 2024–25
- Taça da Liga de Futsal: 2020–21, 2021–22, 2023–24, 2024–25
- Supertaça de Futsal: 2021, 2022, 2025
- UEFA Futsal Champions League: 2020–21, 2025–26

Portugal

- FIFA Futsal World Cup: 2021
- UEFA Futsal Championship: 2022, 2026
- Futsal Finalissima: 2022
