= UEFA Futsal Euro 2026 =

2026. gada Eiropas čempionāts telpu futbolā; 2026 metų Europos salės futbolo čempionatas Evropsko prvenstvo v futsalu 2026

Tournament details
- Host country: Latvia; Lithuania; Slovenia
- Cities: Riga; Kaunas; Ljubljana
- Dates: 21 January – 7 February
- Teams: 16 (from 1 confederation)
- Venues: 4 (in 3 host cities)

Final positions
- Champions: Spain (8th title)
- Runners-up: Portugal
- Third place: Croatia
- Fourth place: France

Tournament statistics
- Matches played: 32
- Goals scored: 183 (5.72 per match)
- Attendance: 91,044 (2,845 per match)
- Top scorer(s): (France) Souheil Mouhoudine (Spain) Antonio Pérez (7 goals each)
- Best player: (Spain) Antonio Pérez

The 2026 UEFA Futsal Championship, commonly referred to as UEFA Futsal Euro 2026, was the 13th edition of the UEFA Futsal Championship, the quadrennial international futsal championship organised by UEFA for the men's national teams of Europe.

This was the second tournament to be held on a four-year basis after 2022. It took place between 21 January and 7 February 2026. The tournament was supposed to be held solely in Latvia and Lithuania, but due to their unwillingness to accommodate Belarus, UEFA added Slovenia as a third co-host as the Slovenians agreed to hosting the Belarusian team. This marked the first time the Futsal Euro was co-hosted and the first UEFA tournament to have three nations hosting (excluding UEFA Euro 2020 as twelve cities across Europe hosted the event). This was the first time a senior UEFA national team tournament was held in the Baltics.

For the second time after the expansion in 2022, 16 teams took part. Qualification took place between April 2024 and September 2025. The original two co-hosts, Latvia and Lithuania, qualified automatically, becoming the first host nations to make their debut at the same tournament they are hosting. Armenia also made their debut.

Portugal were the two-time defending champions after previously winning in 2018 and 2022. Spain won their eighth title after beating Portugal 5–3 in the final in Ljubljana. Croatia won their first ever medal after beating France in the third place play off on penalties.

== Host selection ==
The bidding procedure for hosting was launched in 2022, with a deadline of January 2023 to express their interest in hosting. UEFA requirements states the host country needs to have two arena, one with a spectator capacity of at least 7,500 and the other with at least 4,500.

The final proposal had to delivered with the bid dossier in May 2023 at the latest, and UEFA received four bids:

- Belgium and France
- Finland
- Latvia
- Lithuania

Soon after, Belgium and France became two separate bids, while Latvia and Lithuania merged their bids.

- Belgium
- France
- Finland
- Latvia and Lithuania

On 2 December 2023, Latvia and Lithuania were awarded the hosting rights in Hamburg, Germany.

=== Slovenia added as a co-host ===
However, problems emerged with the hosting arrangement after Belarus qualified, with neither country willing to host them due to the Russo-Ukrainian war. Latvia had stated that they were ready to relinquish their hosting rights if they had to host Belarus. UEFA was supposed to make a decision in May 2025 but it was delayed. On 27 June 2025, Slovenia were added as a third co-host, with two venues in Ljubljana. Lithuanian Football Federation general secretary, Edgaras Stankevičius, stated he supports the hosting system. The plan was approved by the Slovenian government as well. Belarus and Kazakhstan also stated an interest in hosting the event. The arrangement was very similar to the India and Pakistan cricket arrangement where neither side can play a world cup in the other country, so a neutral venue had to be found. Arena Stožice and Tivoli Arena were selected by Slovenia.

== Preparations ==
=== 2024 ===
- On 22 October, UEFA representatives went to observe Lithuania's preparations for the second time.

=== 2025 ===
- On 30 September, Slovenia's official website was released.
- On 17 October, Slovenian captain, Igor Osredkar, and former Slovenian football international, Bojan Jokić, were revealed as Slovenia's ambassadors.
- On 24 October, on the day of the draw, Slovenia set up a countdown clock for the tournament.
- Lithuanian boxer, Eimantas Stanionis, was announced as Lithuania's ambassador.
- On 27 October, a newly designed trophy for the Futsal Euro was shown for the first time.
- On 3 December, a press conference between president of the Slovenian Football Association, Radenko Mijatovic, and the deputy mayor of the Ljubljana Municipality, Samo Logar, took place in Ljubljana.
- On 5 December, the process of media accreditation in Lithuania was opened, with the deadline being the 7 January 2026.
- On 22 December, an event in the Domina shopping centre in Riga took place.

=== 2026 ===
- On 9 January, the process of media accreditation in Latvia was opened.
- On 12 January, UEFA announced that each host country will have a unique court based on their national colours.

=== Tickets ===
On 27 October at 12:00 CET, tickets sales started. The tickets were split into categories 1 and 2, priced at 20 and 15 euros respectively.

==== Ticket websites ====
- Tickets for Riga, Latvia
- Tickets for Kaunas, Lithuania
- Tickets for Ljubljana, Slovenia

=== Sponsors ===
- Adidas
- Alipay
- Atos
- Carlsberg
- Hisense
- Visit Qatar
- Dana (in Slovenia)
- Eventim (in Slovenia)

== Qualification ==
Map of qualifiers for the UEFA Futsal Euro 2026: Team qualified for UEFA Futsal Euro 2026 Team failed to qualify Team banned from competition Did not enter

A total 48 teams took part in qualification. After the preliminary round, 40 teams were divided into ten groups of four, held in a round-robin home-and-away format. The group winners secure qualification while the best eight runners-up advanced to the play-offs. The eight play-off teams were split into four separate ties. The four winners of the play-offs took the final four spots. Qualification was held between 9 April 2024 and 24 September 2025.

Of the sixteen teams, only 8 took part in 2022. Co-hosts Latvia and Lithuania automatically qualified and debuted, marking the first time that the host nations made their debut at the same tournament they hosted. From the qualification process, Armenia qualified for the first time, with the Armenians qualifying for a UEFA tournament for the first time ever. Regarding the returnees, Belarus made their second appearance after 2010, 2014 hosts Belgium qualified after failing to make it since that year, Czech Republic and Hungary secured their passage after a 10-year absence and France progressed after a one edition drought.

Regarding the absentees, the most notable teams are Kazakhstan and former champions Russia. The Kazakhs have reached the knockout stage of the last six major tournaments but due to new rules regarding naturalized players, their squad was weakened during qualification, leading to them missing out after losing their play-off tie against Italy on penalties. The Russians did take part for the first time due to UEFA's ban after the country's invasion of Ukraine. Perennial participants, Azerbaijan, also failed to qualify for the first time since 2007 after coming bottom of their qualification group. 2022 hosts and 2024 FIFA Futsal World Cup participants, Netherlands, could not make it after finishing as one of the worst runner-ups, being the first team since Belgium in 2016 to not qualify after hosting. Serbia failed to advance after making the previous three editions. Having made their debut in the previous edition, Bosnia and Herzegovina, Finland and Slovakia all failed to qualify, leaving Georgia as the only team who managed to do so.

The highest ranked team to fail to qualify was 8th, Kazakhstan (Note: Russia, ranked 9th, banned from qualifications.) while Belgium (Note: Excluding the co-hosts Latvia and Lithuania due to them qualifying automatically.) was the lowest ranked team to make it ranked 34th.

=== Qualified teams ===
The following 16 teams qualified for the final tournament.

Team	Qualification method	Date of qualification	Appearance(s)				Previous best performance (Note: Bold text indicates they hosted that edition.)	WR (Note: World ranking at start of tournament)
Team	Qualification method	Date of qualification	Total	First	Last	Streak	Previous best performance	WR
Latvia	Co-hosts	2 December 2023	1st	Debut				52
Lithuania	Co-hosts	2 December 2023	1st	Debut				77
Portugal	Group 7 winners	5 February 2025	11th	1999	2022	10	Champions (2018, 2022)	2
Armenia	Group 6 winners	12 March 2025	1st	Debut				23
Czech Republic	Group 9 winners	12 March 2025	9th	2001	2016	1	Third place (2003, 2010)	17
Poland	Group 3 winners	10 April 2025	4th	2001	2022	3	Group stage (2001, 2018, 2022)	19
Slovenia	Group 4 winners	10 April 2025	8th	2003	2022	7	Quarter-finals (2014, 2018)	21
Ukraine	Group 1 winners	11 April 2025	12th	1996	2022	11	Runners-up (2001, 2003)	8
Croatia	Group 5 winners	11 April 2025	7th	1999	2022	2	Fourth place (2012)	14
Belarus	Group 2 winners	11 April 2025	2nd	2010		1	Group stage (2010)	25
Spain	Group 8 winners	15 April 2025	13th	1996	2022	13	Champions (Seven times) (Note: Spain have won in 1996, 2001, 2005, 2007, 2010, 2012 and 2016.)	3
France	Group 10 winners	16 April 2025	2nd	2018		1	Group stage (2018)	10
Italy	Play-off winners	23 September 2025	13th	1996	2022	13	Champions (2003, 2014)	16
Georgia	Play-off winners	23 September 2025	2nd	2022		2	Quarter-finals (2022)	15
Hungary	Play-off winners	24 September 2025	4th	2005	2016	1	Group stage (2005, 2010, 2016)	32
Belgium	Play-off winners	24 September 2025	6th	1996	2014	1	Third place (1996)	34

1. Note BLR: Latvia's sports law states that it is prohibited in Latvia to organize team sports competitions of national teams (adults, youth and juniors) in which national teams of Russia or Belarus participate under their flag or in a neutral status (2nd paragraph of article 17^{1}). On 27 June, UEFA announced they would play all their games in Slovenia.
2. Note UKR: The Ministry of Youth and Sports of Ukraine approved Ukraine national team's participation at this competition, though a boycott of the tournament had previously been considered (to protest Belarus national team's participation due to Belarus' role in the Russian invasion of Ukraine).

== Venues ==
The tournament was held at four venues, with two in Ljubljana and one each in Riga and Kaunas. Before Slovenia's inclusion, the final was planned to be in Riga. The opening match was in Riga. The final was at Arena Stožice in Ljubljana. Latvia and Lithuania each hosted one group and a quarterfinal, while Slovenia hosted two groups and the remaining knockout stage matches. With UEFA not allowing arenas to include sponsors in their names, the Xiaomi Arena was changed to its original name, Arena Riga, for the tournament. Ljubljana became the first city to host two UEFA Futsal Euros.

=== Overview of venues ===
- Ljubljana's Arena Stožice is Slovenia's biggest arena. Built in 2010, it has since hosted EuroBasket 2013, UEFA Futsal Euro 2018, 2019 Men's European Volleyball Championship, 2022 FIVB Men's Volleyball World Championship, 2022 European Women's Handball Championship and EuroBasket Women 2023.
- The Žalgiris Arena in Kaunas is the largest arena in the Baltics. The venue has held EuroBasket 2011 and the 2021 FIFA Futsal World Cup.
- The Arena Riga is Latvia's biggest indoor venue. Based in Riga, it has hosted various events including: EuroBasket in 2015 and 2025, the EuroBasket Women in 2009 and 2019, IIHF World Championship in 2006, 2021 and 2023 and the 2016 Men's World Floorball Championships.
- The Tivoli Arena in Ljubljana has organised the 2004 European Men's Handball Championship and EuroBasket 2013. Before Slovenian independence, it also held various championships as Yugoslavia. The facility is primarily used for ice hockey.

(Slovenia) Ljubljana	UEFA Futsal Euro 2026 (Europe)	(Lithuania) Kaunas
Arena Stožice	UEFA Futsal Euro 2026 (Europe)	Žalgiris Arena
Capacity: 10,600	UEFA Futsal Euro 2026 (Europe)	Capacity: 10,198
(Latvia) Riga	UEFA Futsal Euro 2026 (Europe)	(Slovenia) Ljubljana
Arena Riga	UEFA Futsal Euro 2026 (Europe)	Tivoli Arena
Capacity: 9,975	UEFA Futsal Euro 2026 (Europe)	Capacity: 2,500

=== Tournament venues information ===
Venue	Rounds	Games
(Slovenia) Arena Stožice	Group C and D, Quarter-finals, Semi-finals and Final	16
(Latvia) Arena Riga	Group A, Quarter-finals	7
(Lithuania) Žalgiris Arena	Group B, Quarter-finals	7
(Slovenia) Tivoli Arena	Group C and D	2

== Draw ==
The Žalgiris Arena in Kaunas hosted the draw.

The draw was held at 12:00 EET on 24 October 2025 at the Žalgiris Arena in Kaunas, Lithuania. Lithuanian presenter, Gabrielė Martirosian hosted the draw. The guests were Portuguese futsal legend, Ricardinho and Lithuanian professional boxer and tournament ambassador Eimantas Stanionis, who assisted with the draw. Before the draw started, co-hosts Latvia, Lithuania and Slovenia were all pre-allocated into positions A1, B1 and C1 in each of their groups respectively. The draw started with, in order, pots 1, 2, 3 and 4 being drawn, with each team selected then allocated into the first available group alphabetically. The position for the team within the group would then be drawn (for the purpose of the schedule).

There were two restrictions on the draw. Firstly, Belarus had to be drawn in a group held in Slovenia due to domestic laws in Latvia and Lithuania which prohibit matches involving Belarusian teams to be played in their countries. Secondly, Ukraine had to be drawn into a group held in Latvia and Lithuania to avoid playing Belarus as far into the tournament as possible (if the scenario does happen).

=== Seeding ===
The seeding was based on the UEFA men's futsal national team coefficient rankings as of 26 September 2025.

Pot 1
Team	Rank	Coeff
Portugal	1	2945.674
Spain	2	2639.875
Ukraine	5	2344.186
France	6	2193.280

Pot 2
Team	Rank	Coeff
Croatia	7	2068.750
Italy	8	1957.470
Slovenia (H)	9	1921.849
Czech Republic	10	1914.870

Pot 3
Team	Rank	Coeff
Poland	11	1908.193
Armenia	13	1828.292
Georgia	14	1786.617
Belarus	15	1781.380

Pot 4
Team	Rank	Coeff
Belgium	18	1717.559
Hungary	20	1675.045
Latvia (H)	27	1387.298
Lithuania (H)	35	1195.609

=== Draw results ===
Group A in Riga
Pos	Team
A1	Latvia (H)
A2	Croatia
A3	Georgia
A4	France

Group B in Kaunas
Pos	Team
B1	Lithuania (H)
B2	Armenia
B3	Czech Republic
B4	Ukraine

Group C in Ljubljana
Pos	Team
C1	Slovenia (H)
C2	Belarus
C3	Spain
C4	Belgium

Group D in Ljubljana
Pos	Team
D1	Poland
D2	Italy
D3	Hungary
D4	Portugal

- UEFA Futsal Euro 2026 – Draw
- Draw Live Streaming (in Slovenian)

=== Schedule ===
Schedule
Round	Matchday	Date
Group stage	Matchday 1	21–24 January 2026
Group stage	Matchday 2	25–27 January 2026
Group stage	Matchday 3	28–29 January 2026
Knockout stage	Quarter-finals	31 January – 1 February 2026
Knockout stage	Semi-finals	4 February 2026
Knockout stage	Final; Third place	7 February 2026

== Squads ==
Each national team had to submit a squad of 14 players, two of whom must be goalkeepers. During the tournament, each team was allowed to replace a maximum of one outfield player if they were injured or ill preventing them from participating in the tournament. Each team was also allowed to temporarily replace a goalkeeper if there were fewer than two healthy goalkeepers.

== Referees ==
A total of 32 referees and four referee observers were selected for the tournament. They were split into two groups – one for matches in Latvia and Lithuania, and one for matches in Slovenia.

Each match was officiated by a team of four referees and a timekeeper. Any referee may be one of the two referees on the pitch, the third referee, the fourth referee, or the timekeeper.

=== Referees ===
==== Latvia and Lithuania ====
- (Azerbaijan) Hikmat Qafarli
- (England) Peter Nurse
- (Spain) Juan José Cordero
- (Spain) Alejandro Martínez
- (Italy) Nicola Manzione
- (Italy) Chiara Perona
- (North Macedonia) Marjan Mladenovski
- (North Macedonia) Done Ristovski
- (Norway) Dag Erik Tangvik
- (Norway) Telmen Undrakh
- (Portugal) Cristiano Santos
- (Portugal) Rúben Santos
- (Slovenia) Aleš Močnik Perič
- (Slovenia) Dejan Veselič
- (Switzerland) Daniel Matkovic
- (Switzerland) David Schärli
- (Belgium) Perry Gautier (Observer)
- (Italy) Massimo Cumbo (Observer)

==== Slovenia ====
- (Bulgaria) Kaloyan Kirilov
- (Croatia) Nikola Jelić
- (Czech Republic) Ondřej Černý
- (Estonia) Grigori Osomkov
- (Finland) Arttu Kyynäräinen
- (France) Victor Chaix
- (France) Julien Lang
- (Lithuania) Dominykas Norkus
- (Moldova) Viktor Bugenko
- (Poland) Damian Grabowski
- (Romania) Bogdan Hanceariuc
- (Serbia) Petar Radojčić
- (Sweden) Ademir Avdic
- (Sweden) David Glavonjic
- (Ukraine) Denys Kutsyi
- (Ukraine) Mariia Myslovska
- (Croatia) Ivan Novak (Observer)
- (Spain) Pedro Galán Nieto (Observer)

== Group stage ==
Map of final standings for the UEFA Futsal Euro 2026: Winner Runner-up / Third place Fourth place / Quarter-finals Group stage

The group winners and runners-up advanced to the quarter-finals. The schedule was announced after the draw by UEFA.

Tiebreakers

In the group stage, teams are ranked according to points (3 points for a win, 1 point for a draw, 0 points for a loss), and if tied on points, the following tiebreaking criteria are applied, in the order given, to determine the rankings (Regulations Articles 20.01 and 20.02):

1. Points in head-to-head matches among tied teams;
2. Goal difference in head-to-head matches among tied teams;
3. Goals scored in head-to-head matches among tied teams;
4. If more than two teams are tied, and after applying all head-to-head criteria above, a subset of teams are still tied, all head-to-head criteria above are reapplied exclusively to this subset of teams;
5. Goal difference in all group matches;
6. Goals scored in all group matches;
7. Penalty shoot-out if only two teams have the same number of points, and they met in the last round of the group and are tied after applying all criteria above (not used if more than two teams have the same number of points, or if their rankings are not relevant for qualification for the next stage);
8. Disciplinary points (red card = 3 points, yellow card = 1 point, expulsion for two yellow cards in one match = 3 points);
9. UEFA coefficient ranking for the final draw.

All times are local. Latvia and Lithuania use EET (UTC+2) and Slovenia uses CET (UTC+1).

=== Group A ===
Pos	Team	Pld	W	D	L	GF	GA	GD	Pts	Qualification
1	France	3	2	1	0	10	3	+7	7	Knockout stage
2	Croatia	3	1	2	0	8	5	+3	5	Knockout stage
3	Latvia (H)	3	1	0	2	5	9	−4	3	
4	Georgia	3	0	1	2	3	9	−6	1	

Source: UEFA
Rules for classification: Tiebreakers
(H) Hosts
21 January 2026
17:00 UTC+2

Croatia	2–2	France
Kustura 13'08", 34'01"	Report	Touré 14'45"; Guirio 16'40"

Arena Riga, Riga
Attendance: 1,265
Referee: Juan José Cordero (Spain), Alejandro Martínez (Spain)
21 January 2026
20:00 UTC+2

Latvia	4–0	Georgia
Matjušenko 2'41"; Tarakanovs 24'01", 26'34"; Baklanovs 39'37"	Report

Arena Riga, Riga
Attendance: 3,153
Referee: Cristiano Santos (Portugal), Rúben Santos (Portugal)

25 January 2026
14:00 UTC+2

Croatia	2–2	Georgia
Kustura 15'52"; Lima 22'33"	Report	Sekulić 5'42" (o.g.); Kekelia 34'13"

Arena Riga, Riga
Attendance: 2,030
Referee: Dag Erik Tangvik (Norway), Telmen Undrakh (Norway)
25 January 2026
17:00 UTC+2

France	5–0	Latvia
Mouhoudine 23'04", 32'00"; Belhaj 29'38"; A. Mohammed 35'07"; Touré 39'58"	Report

Arena Riga, Riga
Attendance: 5,277
Referee: Daniel Matković (Switzerland), David Schärli (Switzerland)

28 January 2026
17:30 UTC+2

Latvia	1–4	Croatia
Tarakanovs 4'07"	Report	Jurlina 19'05"; Perić 24'08"; Lima 30'30"; Mataja 35'41"

Arena Riga, Riga
Attendance: 3,235
Referee: Chiara Perona (Italy), Nicola Manzione (Italy)
28 January 2026
17:30 UTC+2

Georgia	1–3	France
Gabrichidze 32'44"	Report	Kekelia 2'20" (o.g.); Mouhoudine 17'32"; A. Mohammed 37'57"

Žalgiris Arena, Kaunas
Attendance: 985
Referee: Aleš Močnik Perič (Slovenia), Dejan Veselič (Slovenia)

=== Group B ===
Pos	Team	Pld	W	D	L	GF	GA	GD	Pts	Qualification
1	Armenia	3	2	1	0	10	8	+2	7	Knockout stage
2	Ukraine	3	2	0	1	10	6	+4	6	Knockout stage
3	Lithuania (H)	3	0	2	1	7	10	−3	2	
4	Czech Republic	3	0	1	2	10	13	−3	1	

Source: UEFA
Rules for classification: Tiebreakers
(H) Hosts
22 January 2026
17:00 UTC+2

Armenia	2–1	Ukraine
Dermenjyan 29'46", 38'04"	Report	Pervieiev 25'20"

Žalgiris Arena, Kaunas
Attendance: 1,661
Referee: Nicola Manzione (Italy), Chiara Perona (Italy)
22 January 2026
20:00 UTC+2

Lithuania	3–3	Czech Republic
E. Baranauskas 12'46"; Raštutis 16'49"; Derendiajev 18'30"	Report	Seidler 9'29", 14'27"; Mikus 39'25"

Žalgiris Arena, Kaunas
Attendance: 5,198
Referee: Dejan Veselič (Slovenia), Aleš Močnik Perič (Slovenia)

25 January 2026
14:00 UTC+2

Armenia	5–4	Czech Republic
Sanosyan 2'02"; Khromykh 6'27", 30'50"; Koudelka 18'14" (o.g.); Petrosov 30'34"	Report	P. Drozd 1'26"; Mikus 24'00"; D. Drozd 37'04", 39'03"

Žalgiris Arena, Kaunas
Attendance: 2,008
Referee: Done Ristovski (North Macedonia), Marjan Mladenovski (North Macedonia)
25 January 2026
17:00 UTC+2

Ukraine	4–1	Lithuania
Cherniavskyi 6'56"; Pervieiev 12'45"; Korsun 22'55"; Abakshyn 32'31"	Report	Derendiajev 35'10"

Žalgiris Arena, Kaunas
Attendance: 6,092
Referee: Hikmat Qafarli (Azerbaijan), Peter Nurse (England)

28 January 2026
20:30 UTC+2

Lithuania	3–3	Armenia
Baranauskas 24'32", 34'00"; Vasylius 36'31"	Report	Nevedrov 2'09"; Reimaris 18'34" (o.g.); Sanosyan 29'25"

Žalgiris Arena, Kaunas
Attendance: 2,677
Referee: Rúben Santos (Portugal), Cristiano Santos (Portugal)
28 January 2026
20:30 UTC+2

Czech Republic	3–5	Ukraine
P. Drozd 29'19"; Knobloch 35'08"; Záruba 38'44"	Report	Cherniavskyi 14'40"; Zhuk 15'36"; Abakshyn 22'09", 27'21"; Shved 35'54"

Arena Riga, Riga
Attendance: 1,250
Referee: Alejandro Martínez (Spain), Juan José Cordero (Spain)

=== Group C ===
Pos	Team	Pld	W	D	L	GF	GA	GD	Pts	Qualification
1	Spain	3	3	0	0	16	4	+12	9	Knockout stage
2	Belgium	3	1	0	2	11	15	−4	3 (Note: Tied on head-to-head points. Head-to-head goal difference: Belgium: +3, Slovenia 0, Belarus –3.)	Knockout stage
3	Slovenia (H)	3	1	0	2	8	11	−3	3	
4	Belarus	3	1	0	2	3	8	−5	3	

Source: UEFA
Rules for classification: Tiebreakers
(H) Hosts
Notes:
23 January 2026
17:30 UTC+1

Belarus	0–4	Belgium
	Report	Rahou 3'18", 29'23", 37'29"; Dillien 38'19"

Arena Stožice, Ljubljana
Attendance: 2,869
Referee: Damian Grabowski (Poland), Dominykas Norkus (Lithuania)
23 January 2026
20:30 UTC+1

Slovenia	1–4	Spain
Fideršek 27'40"	Report	Pérez 0'25"; Mellado 6'02"; Raya 15'18"; Gordillo 17'02"

Arena Stožice, Ljubljana
Attendance: 8,109
Referee: Nikola Jelić (Croatia), Ondřej Černý (Czechia)

26 January 2026
17:30 UTC+1

Belarus	0–2	Spain
	Report	Mellado 5'20"; Novoa 20'40"

Arena Stožice, Ljubljana
Attendance: 1,272
Referee: Ademir Avdic (Sweden), David Glavonjic (Sweden)
26 January 2026
20:30 UTC+1

Belgium	4–5	Slovenia
Gréllo 1'44"; Rahou 8'20", 34'44"; Vanderheyden 23'30"	Report	Turk 3'42"; Aabbou 5'56" (o.g.); Janež 14'21"; Čeh 15'54"; Fideršek 17'23"

Arena Stožice, Ljubljana
Attendance: 3,195
Referee: Viktor Bugenko (Moldova), Grigori Ošomkov (Estonia)

29 January 2026
17:30 UTC+1

Slovenia	2–3	Belarus
Bukovec 0'09", 24'37"	Report	Krykun 7'32"; Kozel 21'42", 28'20"

Arena Stožice, Ljubljana
Attendance: 3,195
Referee: Victor Chaix (France), Julien Lang (France)
29 January 2026
17:30 UTC+1

Spain	10–3	Belgium
Rivera 2'17"; Pérez 5'33"; Raya 7'13", 34'57"; Ramírez 7'33", 20'46"; Cecilio 23'17", 34'01"; Adolfo 26'45"; Mellado 26'57"	Report	Gréllo 7'01"; Bachar 35'36"; Rahou 39'09"

Tivoli Arena, Ljubljana
Attendance: 300
Referee: Mariia Myslovska (Ukraine), Denys Kutsyi (Ukraine)

=== Group D ===
Pos	Team	Pld	W	D	L	GF	GA	GD	Pts	Qualification
1	Portugal	3	3	0	0	14	5	+9	9	Knockout stage
2	Italy	3	1	1	1	8	8	0	4 (Note: Tied on head-to-head. Decided by overall goal difference.)	Knockout stage
3	Hungary	3	1	1	1	7	9	−2	4	
4	Poland	3	0	0	3	4	11	−7	0	

Source: UEFA
Rules for classification: Tiebreakers
Notes:
24 January 2026
14:30 UTC+1

Italy	2–6	Portugal
C. Musumeci 1'28"; Brito 31'25" (o.g.)	Report	Santos 15'10", 38'16"; Kutchy 23'33", 24'26"; Góis 26'28"; B. Coelho 39'20"

Arena Stožice, Ljubljana
Attendance: 1,857
Referee: Denys Kutsyi (Ukraine), Mariia Myslovska (Ukraine)
24 January 2026
17:30 UTC+1

Hungary	4–2	Poland
Fekete 6'25"; Pál 27'41"; Suscsák 34'50", 37'19"	Report	Pawlus 10'15"; Kajtár 13'48" (o.g.)

Arena Stožice, Ljubljana
Attendance: 2,338
Referee: Julien Lang (France), Victor Chaix (France)

27 January 2026
17:30 UTC+1

Hungary	1–5	Portugal
Rutai 35'10"	Report	Erick 0'23"; Lúcio Jr 5'48"; Santos 21'45"; Paçó 24'12"; Pany Varela 33'08"

Arena Stožice, Ljubljana
Attendance: 538
Referee: Bogdan Hanceariuc (Romania), Kaloyan Kirilov (Bulgaria)
27 January 2026
20:30 UTC+1

Poland	0–4	Italy
	Report	De Oliveira 2'20", 12'15", 32'06"; Barichello 14'06"

Arena Stožice, Ljubljana
Attendance: 479
Referee: Dominykas Norkus (Lithuania), Arttu Kyynäräinen (Finland)

29 January 2026
20:30 UTC+1

Portugal	3–2	Poland
Paçó 5'47"; A. Coelho 14'51"; Góis 36'28"	Report	Leszczak 13'01"; Zastawnik 17'37"

Arena Stožice, Ljubljana
Attendance: 1,432
Referee: Grigori Ošomkov (Estonia), Viktor Bugenko (Moldova)
29 January 2026
20:30 UTC+1

Italy	2–2	Hungary
De Oliveira 11'22"; Calderolli 34'13"	Report	Rutai 7'41", 33'02" (pen.)

Tivoli Arena, Ljubljana
Attendance: 502
Referee: Ondřej Černý (Czechia), Nikola Jelić (Croatia)

== Knockout stage ==
In the knockout stage, extra time and penalty shoot-out were used to decide the winner if necessary, except for the third place match where extra time was not played but instead a direct penalty shoot-out was used.

=== Bracket ===
Quarter-finals
31 January – Xiaomi Arena, Riga
France (a.e.t.)	4
Ukraine	2
1 February – Arena Stožice, Ljubljana
Portugal	8
Belgium	2
31 January – Žalgiris Arena, Kaunas
Armenia	0
Croatia	3
1 February – Arena Stožice, Ljubljana
Spain	4
Italy	0

Semi-finals
4 February – Arena Stožice, Ljubljana
France	1
Portugal	4
4 February – Arena Stožice, Ljubljana
Croatia	1
Spain	2

Final
7 February – Arena Stožice, Ljubljana
Portugal	3
Spain	5
Third place match
7 February – Arena Stožice, Ljubljana
France	5 (5)
Croatia (p)	5 (6)

=== Quarter-finals ===
31 January 2026
17:00 UTC+2

France	4–2 (a.e.t.)	Ukraine
Gueddoura 27'05"; Mouhoudine 40'51" (pen.), 44'55", 47'19"	Report	Zhuk 29'01" (pen.); Korsun 47'34" (pen.)

Arena Riga, Riga
Attendance: 1,821
Referee: Cristiano Santos (Portugal), Rúben Santos (Portugal)

31 January 2026
20:00 UTC+2

Armenia	0–3	Croatia
	Report	Mataja 2'42", 15'48"; Vukmir 6'04"

Žalgiris Arena, Kaunas
Attendance: 1,078
Referee: Juan José Cordero (Spain), Alejandro Martínez (Spain)

1 February 2026
16:00 UTC+1

Portugal	8–2	Belgium
B. Coelho 12'47"; Pany Varela 16'38", 25'10", 39'59"; A. Coelho 19'09"; Góis 22'47"; Lúcio Jr 28'23"; Pauleta 39'42"	Report	Pany Varela 8'06" (o.g.); Aabbou 32'56"

Arena Stožice, Ljubljana
Attendance: 1,115
Referee: Damian Grabowski (Poland), Arttu Kyynäräinen (Finland)

1 February 2026
19:30 UTC+1

Spain	4–0	Italy
Cortés 11'03"; Pérez 19'09", 25:03; Motta 35'58" (o.g.)	Report

Arena Stožice, Ljubljana
Attendance: 1,361
Referee: Julien Lang (France), Victor Chaix (France)

=== Semi-finals ===
4 February 2026
17:00 UTC+1

Croatia	1–2	Spain
Rivillos 36'29" (o.g.)	Report	Ramírez 12'57"; Mellado 18'42"

Arena Stožice, Ljubljana
Attendance: 6,456
Referee: Ondřej Černý (Czechia), Chiara Perona (Italy)

4 February 2026
20:30 UTC+1

France	1–4	Portugal
Touré 5'55"	Report	Santos 17'36"; Paçó 18'43"; Erick 28'13"; Gueddoura 34'07" (o.g.)

Arena Stožice, Ljubljana
Attendance: 3,173
Referee: Nikola Jelić (Croatia), Aleš Močnik Perič (Slovenia)

=== Third place match ===
7 February 2026
16:00 UTC+1

France	5–5	Croatia
Menendez 3'02"; Guirio 21'18", 31'19", 37'34"; Mouhoudine 39'53"	Report	Sekulić 12'19"; Jurlina 18'53"; Jelovčić 20'20"; Hrstić 29'03"; Perić 35'59"
Penalties
A. Mohammed (penalty scored); Guirio (penalty scored); Tchato (penalty scored); Gueddoura (penalty scored); Mouhoudine (penalty scored); Touré (penalty missed)	5–6	(penalty scored) Jelovčić; (penalty scored) Sekulić; (penalty scored) Kustura; (penalty scored) Perić; (penalty scored) Jurlina; (penalty scored) Vukmir

Arena Stožice, Ljubljana
Attendance: 6,997
Referee: Damian Grabowski (Poland), Arttu Kyynäräinen (Finland)

=== Final ===
7 February 2026
19:30 UTC+1

Portugal	3–5	Spain
Afonso 4'43"; Góis 6'35"; Pauleta 29'19"	Report	Pérez 1'18", 19'20" (pen.), 35'20"; Raya 2'29"; Adolfo 39'55"

Arena Stožice, Ljubljana
Attendance: 8,126
Referee: Dejan Veselič (Slovenia), Nicola Manzione (Italy)

== Goalscorers ==
There were 183 goals scored in 32 matches, for an average of 5.72 goals per match.

7 goals

- (Spain) Antonio Pérez
- (France) Souheil Mouhoudine

6 goals

- (Belgium) Omar Rahou

4 goals

- (France) Ouassini Guirio
- (Italy) Julio De Oliveira
- (Portugal) Diogo Santos
- (Portugal) Pany Varela
- (Portugal) Rúben Góis
- (Spain) Mellado
- (Spain) José Raya

3 goals

- (Croatia) Duje Kustura
- (Croatia) David Mataja
- (France) Mamadou Siragassy Touré
- (Hungary) Balázs Rutai
- (Latvia) Edgars Tarakanovs
- (Lithuania) Edgaras Baranauskas
- (Portugal) Tomás Paçó
- (Spain) Pablo Ramírez
- (Ukraine) Danyil Abakshyn

2 goals

- (Armenia) Mihran Dermenjyan
- (Armenia) Nikita Khromykh
- (Armenia) Vladimir Sanosyan
- (Belarus) Artem Kozel
- (Belgium) Gréllo
- (Croatia) Luka Perić
- (Croatia) Josip Jurlina
- (Croatia) Vitor Lima
- (Czech Republic) David Drozd
- (Czech Republic) Pavel Drozd
- (Czech Republic) Francisco Mikus
- (Czech Republic) Michal Seidler
- (France) Abdessamad Mohammed
- (Hungary) Máté Suscsák
- (Lithuania) Vladimir Derendiajev
- (Portugal) André Coelho
- (Portugal) Bruno Coelho
- (Portugal) Erick
- (Portugal) Kutchy
- (Portugal) Lúcio Jr
- (Portugal) Pauleta
- (Slovenia) Jeremy Bukovec
- (Slovenia) Matej Fideršek
- (Spain) Adolfo
- (Spain) Cecilio
- (Ukraine) Ihor Cherniavskyi
- (Ukraine) Ihor Korsun
- (Ukraine) Vladyslav Pervieiev
- (Ukraine) Yevhenii Zhuk

1 goal

- (Armenia) Denis Nevedrov
- (Armenia) Arsen Petrosov
- (Belarus) Sergei Krykun
- (Belgium) Jamal Aabbou
- (Belgium) Ilias Bachar
- (Belgium) Steven Dillien
- (Belgium) Kenneth Vanderheyden
- (Croatia) Antonio Sekulić
- (Croatia) Jakov Hrstić
- (Croatia) Franco Jelovčić
- (Croatia) Niko Vukmir
- (Czech Republic) Adam Knobloch
- (Czech Republic) Radim Záruba
- (France) Sid Belhaj
- (France) Amine Gueddoura
- (France) Nicolas Menendez
- (Georgia (country)) Nikoloz Gabrichidze
- (Georgia (country)) Vakhtang Kekelia
- (Hungary) Márk Fekete
- (Hungary) Patrik Pál
- (Italy) Matheus Barichello
- (Italy) Fabricio Calderolli
- (Italy) Carmelo Musumeci
- (Latvia) Andrejs Baklanovs
- (Latvia) Germans Matjušenko
- (Lithuania) Ignas Raštutis
- (Lithuania) Gytis Vasylius
- (Poland) Sebastian Leszczak
- (Poland) Kacper Pawlus
- (Poland) Mikołaj Zastawnik
- (Portugal) Afonso Jesus
- (Slovenia) Žiga Čeh
- (Slovenia) Žan Janež
- (Slovenia) Teo Turk
- (Spain) Francisco Cortés
- (Spain) Jesús Gordillo
- (Spain) David Novoa
- (Spain) Adrián Rivera
- (Ukraine) Nazar Shved

1 own goal

- (Belgium) Jamal Aabbou (against Slovenia)
- (Croatia) Antonio Sekulić (against Georgia)
- (Czech Republic) Tomáš Koudelka (against Armenia)
- (France) Amine Gueddoura (against Portugal)
- (Georgia (country)) Vakhtang Kekelia (against France)
- (Hungary) Mátyás Kajtár (against Poland)
- (Italy) Gabriel Motta (against Spain)
- (Lithuania) Deividas Reimaris (against Armenia)
- (Portugal) Tiago Brito (against Italy)
- (Portugal) Pany Varela (against Belgium)
- (Spain) Mario Rivillos Plaza (against Croatia)

Source: UEFA

== Tournament ranking ==
=== Best results ===
Team	Previous	New
Croatia	4th (2010)	3rd
France	Group stage (2018)	4th

=== Ranking table ===
Per statistical convention in football, matches decided in extra time are counted as wins and losses, while matches decided by penalty shoot-out are counted as draws.

Pos	Team	Pld	W	D	L	GF	GA	GD	Pts	Final result
1	Spain	6	6	0	0	27	8	+19	18	Champions
2	Portugal	6	5	0	1	29	13	+16	15	Runners-up
3	Croatia	6	2	3	1	17	12	+5	9	Third place
4	France	6	3	2	1	20	14	+6	11	Fourth place
5	Armenia	4	2	1	1	10	11	–1	7	Eliminated in Quarter-finals
6	Ukraine	4	2	0	2	12	10	+2	6	Eliminated in Quarter-finals
7	Italy	4	1	1	2	8	12	–4	4	Eliminated in Quarter-finals
8	Belgium	4	1	0	3	13	23	–10	3	Eliminated in Quarter-finals
9	Hungary	3	1	1	1	7	9	–2	4	Eliminated in Group stage
10	Slovenia	3	1	0	2	8	11	–3	3	Eliminated in Group stage
11	Latvia	3	1	0	2	5	9	–4	3	Eliminated in Group stage
12	Belarus	3	1	0	2	3	8	–5	3	Eliminated in Group stage
13	Lithuania	3	0	2	1	7	10	–3	2	Eliminated in Group stage
14	Czech Republic	3	0	1	2	10	13	–3	1	Eliminated in Group stage
15	Georgia	3	0	1	2	3	9	–6	1	Eliminated in Group stage
16	Poland	3	0	0	3	4	11	–7	0	Eliminated in Group stage

== Statistics ==
UEFA Futsal Euro 2026

Spain
Eighth title

Team roster: Chemi Oliver, Cecilio Morales, Ricardo Mayor, Adri Rivera,
Antonio Pérez, José Raya, Adolfo Fernández, Pablo Ramírez, Mario Rivillos,
Francisco Cortés, Miguel Ángel Mellado, Jesús Gordillo, David Novoa, Dídac Plana.
Head Coach: Jesús Velasco

=== All Star Team ===
The all-star team was announced on 9 February.

Position	Player
Goalkeeper	(Portugal) Bernardo Paçó
Defender	(Spain) Antonio Pérez
Wing	(Spain) Miguel Mellado
Wing	(Portugal) Pany Varela
Pivot	(Spain) Pablo Ramírez

=== Player of the tournament ===
The player of the tournament was announced on 7 February.

MVP
(Spain) Antonio Pérez

=== Man of the match ===
A man of the match award was given to the player deemed as playing the best in each match.

Round	Team	Match	Team	Player
Group A	Croatia	2–2	France	(Croatia) Franko Jelovčić
Group A	Latvia	4–0	Georgia	(Latvia) Edgars Tarakanovs
Group A	Croatia	2–2	Georgia	(Georgia (country)) Ali Aslani
Group A	France	5–0	Latvia	(France) Souheil Mouhoudine
Group A	Latvia	1–4	Croatia	(Croatia) Vítor Lima
Group A	Georgia	1–3	France	(France) Abdessamad Mohammed
Group B	Armenia	2–1	Ukraine	(Armenia) Mihran Dermenjyan
Group B	Lithuania	3–3	Czech Republic	(Lithuania) Ernestas Macenis
Group B	Armenia	5–4	Czech Republic	(Armenia) Nikita Khromykh
Group B	Ukraine	4–1	Lithuania	(Ukraine) Ihor Cherniavskyi
Group B	Lithuania	3–3	Armenia	(Lithuania) Edgaras Baranauskas
Group B	Czech Republic	3–5	Ukraine	(Ukraine) Danyil Abakshyn
Group C	Belarus	0–4	Belgium	(Belgium) Omar Rahou
Group C	Slovenia	1–4	Spain	(Spain) Mellado
Group C	Belarus	0–2	Spain	(Spain) David Novoa
Group C	Belgium	4–5	Slovenia	(Slovenia) Matej Fideršek
Group C	Slovenia	2–3	Belarus	(Belarus) Dmitri Shvedko
Group C	Spain	10–3	Belgium	(Spain) Pablo Ramírez
Group D	Italy	2–6	Portugal	(Portugal) Kutchy
Group D	Hungary	4–2	Poland	(Hungary) Máté Suscsák
Group D	Hungary	1–5	Portugal	(Portugal) Diogo Santos
Group D	Poland	0–4	Italy	(Italy) Julio De Oliveira
Group D	Portugal	3–2	Poland	(Poland) Michał Kałuża
Group D	Italy	2–2	Hungary	(Italy) Alex Merlim
Quarter-finals	France	4–2	Ukraine	(France) Souheil Mouhoudine
Quarter-finals	Armenia	0–3	Croatia	(Croatia) Ante Piplica
Quarter-finals	Portugal	8–2	Belgium	(Portugal) Pany Varela
Quarter-finals	Spain	4–0	Italy	(Spain) Antonio Pérez
Semi-finals	Croatia	1–2	Spain	(Spain) Pablo Ramírez
Semi-finals	France	1–4	Portugal	(Portugal) Tomás Paçó
Third place match	France	5–5 (5–6) PS	Croatia	(Croatia) Franko Jelovčić
Final	Portugal	3–5	Spain	(Spain) Antonio Pérez

=== Notable statistics ===
- Highest attended game: 8,126 (Portugal 3–5 Spain, 7 February)
- Lowest attended game: 300 Spain 10–3 Belgium, 29 January)
- Most goals in a game: 13 (Spain 10–3 Belgium, 29 January)
- Least goals in a game: 2 (Belarus 0–2 Spain, 26 January)
- Most goals by a team in a game: 10 (Spain 10–3 Belgium, 29 January)
- Least goals by a team in a game: 0 (Seven games) (Note: Latvia 4–0 Georgia, France 5–0 Latvia, Belarus 0–4 Belgium, Belarus 0–2 Spain, Poland 0–4 Italy, Armenia 0–3 Croatia, Spain 4–0 Italy)
- Biggest goal difference in a game: 7 (Spain 10–3 Belgium, 29 January)
- Biggest half time deficit in a game: 3 (Slovenia 0–4 Spain, 23 January)
- Most goals scored by a player in a game: 3 goals ( (Belgium) Omar Rahou vs Belarus, 23 January; (Italy) Julio De Oliveira vs Poland, 24 January; (France) Souheil Mouhoudine vs Ukraine, 31 January; (France) Ouassini Guirio vs Croatia, 7 February; (Spain) Antonio Pérez vs Portugal, 7 February)

=== Notable occurrences ===
- On 21 January, Latvia became the first hosts since Serbia in 2016 to win their opening game.
- On 22 January, at 18 years and 69 days old, Ukrainian player, Illia Prykhodko became the youngest player to appear at the finals.
- On 24 January, at 19 years and 168 days old, Polish player, Kacper Pawlus, became the youngest player to score at the finals, after scoring Poland's first goal in a 4–2 defeat to Hungary.
- On 26 January, at 40 years and 209 days old, Belgian player, Gréllo, became the oldest player to score at the finals, after scoring Belgium's first goal in a 5–4 defeat to Slovenia.
- On 29 January, Spain's 10–3 win over Belgium broke the record for most goals by a team in one match at the Euro. In the same match, Omar Rahou tied the competition record of 6 goals in the group stage.
- Armenia, Belarus, France, Hungary and Latvia won their first games at the finals.
- Belgium were condemned to their worst loss at the final tournament.
- Armenia became the first debutant since Azerbaijan in 2010 to win their group.

=== Tournament venues attendance ===
Venue	Total	Avr	Games
(Slovenia) Arena Stožice	52,512	3,282	16
(Lithuania) Žalgiris Arena	19,699	2,814	7
(Latvia) Arena Riga	18,031	2,575	7
(Slovenia) Tivoli Arena	802	401	2

== Broadcasting rights ==
On 2 December, the broadcasting rights were announced. For countries with no stated broadcasting rights, matches were broadcast on UEFA.tv.

=== UEFA ===
Territory	Rights holder
Albania	SuperSport
Kosovo	SuperSport
Armenia	AMPTV
Austria	Sportdigital
Germany	Sportdigital
Switzerland	Sportdigital
Belarus	Sport TV
Belgium	RTBF
Bosnia and Herzegovina	RTL
Croatia	RTL
Czechia	ČT
France	L'Équipe
Georgia	GPB
Greece	ERT
Hungary	MTVA
Israel	Charlton
Italy	Rai
Latvia	LTV
Lithuania	Futbolas TV
Netherlands	Ziggo Sport
Poland	TVP
Portugal	RTP
Portugal	Sport TV
Romania	Pro TV
Slovenia	Kanal A
Spain	RTVE
Ukraine	Megogo

=== outside UEFA ===
Territory	Rights holder
Latin America (inc. BRA and exc. MEX)	ESPN
MENA	beIN Sports
Sub-Saharan Africa	Sporty TV (English)
Sub-Saharan Africa	New World TV (French)
United States	TUDN (Spanish)

== Notes ==
Reference
Matchday 1 Day 1
Matchday 1 Day 2
Matchday 1 Day 3
Matchday 1 Day 4
Matchday 2 Day 1
Matchday 2 Day 2
Matchday 2 Day 3
Matchday 3 Day 1
Matchday 3 Day 2
Matchday 4 Day 1
Matchday 4 Day 2
Matchday 5
Matchday 6

Reference
Matchday 1 Day 1
Matchday 1 Day 2
Matchday 1 Day 3
Matchday 1 Day 4
Matchday 2 Day 1
Matchday 2 Day 2
Matchday 2 Day 3
Matchday 3 Day 1
Matchday 3 Day 2
Matchday 4 Day 1
Matchday 4 Day 2
Matchday 5
Matchday 6
