= Pany Varela =

Futsal player

Personal information
- Full name: Anilton César Varela da Silva
- Date of birth: 25 February 1989 (age 37)
- Place of birth: Tarrafal, Cape Verde
- Height: 1.72 m (5 ft 8 in)
- Position: Winger

Team information
- Current team: Sporting CP
- Number: 18

Youth career
- 1999–2003: Os Patuscos
- 2003–2006: Forte da Casa
- 2006–2008: Benfica

Senior career*
| Years | Team | Apps | (Gls) |
| 2008–2013 | Benfica | | |
| 2012 | → Belenenses (loan) | | |
| 2012–2013 | → Olivais (loan) | 6 | (4) |
| 2013–2016 | Fundão | 36 | (26) |
| 2016–2024 | Sporting CP | 148 | (52) |
| 2024—25 | Al-Nassr | 20 | (16) |
| 2025– | Benfica | 26 | (7) |

International career
| 2015– | Portugal | 64 | (14) |
Medal record
Men's futsal
Representing Portugal
UEFA Futsal Championship
| Runner-up | 2026 Latvia / Lithuania / Slovenia |
- * Club domestic league appearances and goals

Anilton César Varela da Silva (born 25 February 1989), also known as Pany Varela, is a futsal player who plays for Al-Nassr futsal club as a winger. Born in Cape Verde, he represents Portugal internationally.

In 2021, he scored in the 2 most important finals of the sport, in terms of clubs and national teams, respectively: 1 goal in the Champions League final against Barcelona and 2 goals (the only ones in the match) in the final of the World Cup against Argentina, thus, aiding both his teams' victories in the competition.

== Club career ==
Born in Tarrafal, Cape Verde, Varela moved to the ICeSa neighbourhood in Vialonga, Portugal in 1999 and started playing futsal for the local club Os Patuscos. After three seasons at UDC Forte da Casa, he moved to the youth ranks of Benfica, staying just one year, earning a place in the main squad in 2008. Over the three years he spent at Benfica, he won three league titles, four other cups, and was part of the squad that won the 2009–10 UEFA Futsal Cup.

On 29 December 2011, Varela was loaned out to gain experience, joining Belenenses on a six-month deal. He moved to Olivais on 19 August 2012, in an equal predicament, but for one season.

On 16 June 2013, Varela moved to Fundão on a permanent deal, In the first year there, he helped the club win their first title ever, the Taça de Portugal de Futsal, plus reach the playoff finals. After three years with Fundão, Varela returned to Lisbon to play for Sporting CP, joining them on 19 July 2016. He helped them reach two consecutive UEFA Futsal Cup finals in 2016–17 and 2017–18.

== International career ==
Varela made his debut for Portugal national team on 22 June 2015, and has represented them on the UEFA Futsal Euro 2016 and UEFA Futsal Euro 2018, winning the latter.

== Honours ==
Benfica

- UEFA Futsal Cup: 2009–10
- Liga Portuguesa: 2008–09, 2011–12, 2025–26
- Taça de Portugal: 2008–09, 2011–12, 2025–26
- Taça da Liga: 2025–26
- Supertaça de Portugal: 2010, 2012

Fundão

- Taça de Portugal: 2013–14

Sporting

- Liga Portuguesa: 2016–17, 2017–18, 2020–21, 2021–22, 2022–23, 2023–24
- Taça de Portugal: 2017–18, 2018–19, 2020–21, 2021-22
- Taça da Liga de Futsal: 2016–17, 2020–21, 2021–22
- Supertaça de Portugal: 2017, 2018, 2019, 2021
- Taça de Honra AF Lisboa: 2016, 2017
- UEFA Futsal Champions League: 2018-19, 2020–21

Al Nassr

- Saudi Games: Bronze medal 2024
- Saudi Arabia Futsal Cup: 2024

Portugal

- UEFA Futsal Championship: 2018, 2022
- FIFA Futsal World Cup: 2021
- Futsal Finalissima: 2022

=== Individual ===
- Best Player in the World: 2022
- FIFA Futsal World Cup Silver Ball 2021
- FIFA Futsal World Cup Silver Shoe 2021
