= Marko Pršić =

Serbian futsal player

Pršić
Personal information
- Full name: Marko Pršić
- Date of birth: 13 September 1990 (age 36)
- Place of birth: SFR Yugoslavia
- Position: Pivot

Team information
- Current team: Ekonomac

International career
Years	Team	Apps	(Gls)
- Serbia

Marko Pršić (born 13 September 1990), is a Serbian futsal player who plays for Ekonomac and the Serbia national futsal team.
