= UEFA Futsal Euro 2022 =

Europees kampioenschap zaalvoetbal 2022

Tournament details
- Host country: Netherlands
- Cities: Amsterdam and Groningen
- Dates: 19 January – 6 February
- Teams: 16 (from 1 confederation)
- Venues: 2 (in 2 host cities)

Final positions
- Champions: Portugal (2nd title)
- Runners-up: Russia
- Third place: Spain
- Fourth place: Ukraine

Tournament statistics
- Matches played: 32
- Goals scored: 173 (5.41 per match)
- Attendance: 16,380 (512 per match)
- Top scorer(s): (Kazakhstan) Birzhan Orazov (7 goals)
- Best player: (Portugal) Zicky Té

The 2022 UEFA Futsal Championship, commonly referred to as UEFA Futsal Euro 2022, was the 12th edition of the UEFA Futsal Championship, the international futsal championship organised by UEFA for the men's national teams of Europe. It was hosted for the first time in the Netherlands.

This is the first tournament to be held on a four-year basis and featuring 16 teams, as the competition was previously played every two years and included 12 teams since 2010. It took place between 19 January and 6 February 2022, in the cities of Amsterdam and Groningen. The teams practiced for the competition in Wildervank and Rotterdam.

Portugal won their second title in a row after defeating Russia in the final 4–2, thus becoming the second national team, after Spain, to successfully defend the title.

== Host selection ==
The bidding procedure for hosting was launched on 12 October 2018, with a deadline of 21 January 2019 to express their interest in hosting. Seven associations expressed an interest in hosting:

- Bosnia and Herzegovina
- France
- Kazakhstan
- Lithuania
- Netherlands
- Portugal
- Sweden

The final proposal had to delivered with the bid dossier by 30 May 2019 at the latest, and UEFA received three bids:

- France: Lille and Orchies
- Netherlands: Amsterdam and Groningen
- Portugal: Lisbon and Porto

The UEFA Executive Committee selected the Netherlands as hosts on 24 September 2019 in Ljubljana.

== Qualification ==
The 15 teams which joined automatically qualified hosts Netherlands in the finals were decided by qualifying running from 29 January 2020 to November 2021.

=== Qualified teams ===
The following 16 teams qualify for the final tournament.

Team	Qualified as	Qualified on	Previous appearances in Futsal Euro^{1}
Netherlands	Hosts	24 September 2019	5 (1996, 1999, 2001, 2005, 2014)
Croatia	Group 1 winners	9 March 2021	5 (1999, 2001, 2012, 2014, 2016)
Russia	Group 2 winners	9 March 2021	11 (1996, **1999**, 2001, 2003, 2005, 2007, 2010, 2012, 2014, 2016, 2018)
Azerbaijan	Group 3 winners	9 March 2021	5 (2010, 2012, 2014, 2016, 2018)
Bosnia and Herzegovina	Group 4 winners	10 March 2021	0 (Debut)
Kazakhstan	Group 5 winners	6 April 2021	2 (2016, 2018)
Spain	Group 6 winners	9 March 2021	11 (**1996**, 1999, **2001**, 2003, **2005**, **2007**, **2010**, **2012**, 2014, **2016**, 2018)
Italy	Group 7 winners	9 March 2021	11 (1996, 1999, 2001, **2003**, 2005, 2007, 2010, 2012, **2014**, 2016, 2018)
Portugal	Group 8 winners	12 April 2021	9 (1999, 2003, 2005, 2007, 2010, 2012, 2014, 2016, **2018**)
Georgia	Among best six runners-up	9 April 2021	0 (Debut)
Slovenia	Among best six runners-up	12 April 2021	6 (2003, 2010, 2012, 2014, 2016, 2018)
Finland	Among best six runners-up	13 April 2021	0 (Debut)
Slovakia	Among best six runners-up	13 April 2021	0 (Debut)
Poland	Among best six runners-up	14 April 2021	2 (2001, 2018)
Ukraine	Among best six runners-up	14 April 2021	10 (1996, 2001, 2003, 2005, 2007, 2010, 2012, 2014, 2016, 2018)
Serbia	Play-off winners	17 November 2021	6 (1999, 2007, 2010, 2012, 2016, 2018)

^{1} Bold indicates champions for that year. Italic indicates hosts for that year.

=== Final draw ===
The final draw was held in Zeist on 18 October 2021. The teams were seeded according to the UEFA senior men's futsal national team coefficient rankings, with the winner of the play-off taking the ranking of the contender with the higher coefficient, Serbia. For political reasons, Russia and Ukraine could not be drawn in the same group or in groups scheduled to be played on the same day (due to a potential clash of teams and clash of fans).

Pot 1	Pot 2	Pot 3	Pot 4
Spain (1); Russia (2); Portugal (3); Kazakhstan (4)	Croatia (5); Azerbaijan (6); Serbia (7); Italy (8)	Ukraine (10); Slovenia (11); Bosnia and Herzegovina (12); Poland (13)	Finland (14); Slovakia (16); Georgia (17); Netherlands (hosts) (19)

== Venues ==
The tournament was held at two venues:

Amsterdam	Groningen	UEFA Futsal Euro 2022 is located in Netherlands
Ziggo Dome; Capacity: 10,500	MartiniPlaza; Capacity: 4,500	UEFA Futsal Euro 2022 is located in Netherlands

Due to COVID-19 restrictions in the Netherlands, initial games of the tournament were held behind closed doors. In the evening of 25 January, the Dutch government allowed a limited number of spectators to attend matches. On 26 January only fans who purchased tickets before the spectator ban could attend, and from 27 January ticket sales were open to the general public. The capacity limits for the rest of the tournament were 1,250 at Ziggo Dome and 650 at MartiniPlaza.

== Squads ==
Each national team have to submit a squad of 14 players, two of whom must be goalkeepers. During the final tournament, each team is allowed to replace a maximum of one outfield player if he is injured or ill severely enough to prevent his participation in the tournament. Each team is also allowed to temporarily replace a goalkeeper if there are fewer than two healthy goalkeepers.

== Group stage ==
The group winners and runners-up advance to the quarter-finals.

Tiebreakers

In the group stage, teams are ranked according to points (3 points for a win, 1 point for a draw, 0 points for a loss), and if tied on points, the following tiebreaking criteria are applied, in the order given, to determine the rankings (Regulations Articles 20.01 and 20.02):

1. Points in head-to-head matches among tied teams;
2. Goal difference in head-to-head matches among tied teams;
3. Goals scored in head-to-head matches among tied teams;
4. If more than two teams are tied, and after applying all head-to-head criteria above, a subset of teams are still tied, all head-to-head criteria above are reapplied exclusively to this subset of teams;
5. Goal difference in all group matches;
6. Goals scored in all group matches;
7. Penalty shoot-out if only two teams have the same number of points, and they met in the last round of the group and are tied after applying all criteria above (not used if more than two teams have the same number of points, or if their rankings are not relevant for qualification for the next stage);
8. Disciplinary points (red card = 3 points, yellow card = 1 point, expulsion for two yellow cards in one match = 3 points);
9. UEFA coefficient ranking for the final draw.

All times are local, CET (UTC+1).

=== Group A ===
Pos	Team	Pld	W	D	L	GF	GA	GD	Pts	Qualification
1	Portugal	3	3	0	0	9	3	+6	9	Knockout stage
2	Ukraine	3	1	0	2	8	5	+3	3 (Note: Ukraine 3 Pts, +4 GD; Netherlands 3 Pts, 0 GD; Serbia 3 Pts, −4 GD)	Knockout stage
3	Netherlands (H)	3	1	0	2	6	9	−3	3	
4	Serbia	3	1	0	2	6	12	−6	3	

Source: UEFA
Rules for classification: Tiebreakers
(H) Hosts
Notes:
19 January 2022
17:30

Serbia	2–4	Portugal
Pršić 1'03", 6'01"	Report	Pauleta 10'33"; Pany Varela 18'11"; Afonso Jesus 24'47"; Tomás Paçó 25'17"

Ziggo Dome, Amsterdam
Attendance: 0
Referee: Nikola Jelić (Croatia), Chiara Perona (Italy)
19 January 2022
20:30

Netherlands	3–2	Ukraine
Saadouni 21'34"; Attaibi 23'16"; Bouzambou 29'15"	Report	Zvarych 0'52"; Shoturma 37'00"

Ziggo Dome, Amsterdam
Attendance: 0
Referee: Ondřej Černý (Czech Republic), Juan José Cordero Gallardo (Spain)

23 January 2022
14:30

Serbia	1–6	Ukraine
Tomić 38'59"	Report	Zvarych 1'10", 33'54"; Vasić 5'51" (o.g.); Abakshyn 14'27"; Cherniavskyi 19'12"; Korsun 38'40"

Ziggo Dome, Amsterdam
Attendance: 0
Referee: David Grøndal Nissen (Denmark), Gábor Kovács (Hungary)
23 January 2022
17:30

Portugal	4–1	Netherlands
Saadouni 5'31" (o.g.); Pany Varela 19'41", 22'56"; Afonso Jesus 39'34"	Report	Bouyouzan 32'34"

Ziggo Dome, Amsterdam
Attendance: 0
Referee: Vedran Babić (Croatia), Kamil Çetin (Turkey)

28 January 2022
20:30

Ukraine	0–1	Portugal
	Report	Zicky Té 36'13"

MartiniPlaza, Groningen
Attendance: 448
Referee: Alejandro Martinez Flores (Spain), Juan José Cordero Gallardo (Spain)
28 January 2022
20:30

Netherlands	2–3	Serbia
Martinus 2'08"; Rakić 22'31" (o.g.)	Report	Rajčević 26'23"; Ramić 31'35"; Stojčevski 32'05"

Ziggo Dome, Amsterdam
Attendance: 1,250
Referee: Chiara Perona (Italy), Nicola Manzione (Italy)

=== Group B ===
Pos	Team	Pld	W	D	L	GF	GA	GD	Pts	Qualification
1	Kazakhstan	3	2	1	0	14	7	+7	7	Knockout stage
2	Finland	3	1	1	1	7	10	−3	4	Knockout stage
3	Slovenia	3	0	2	1	7	8	−1	2	
4	Italy	3	0	2	1	6	9	−3	2	

Source: UEFA
Rules for classification: Tiebreakers
20 January 2022
17:30

Kazakhstan	4–4	Slovenia
Douglas Júnior 15'42", 38'02"; Orazov 24'32"; Tokayev 35'10"	Report	Totošković 10'33"; Fideršek 22'50"; Čeh 30'42"; Turk 32'25"

MartiniPlaza, Groningen
Attendance: 0
Referee: Cédric Pelissier (France), Victor Berg-Audic (France)
20 January 2022
20:30

Italy	3–3	Finland
Nicolodi 2'28"; De Matos 29'02", 38'44"	Report	Alamikkotervo 0'53", 29'12"; Autio 32'23"

MartiniPlaza, Groningen
Attendance: 0
Referee: Vladimir Kadykov (Russia), Petar Radojčić (Serbia)

24 January 2022
17:30

Italy	2–2	Slovenia
Nicolodi 0'40"; Alex Merlim 31'51"	Report	Alex Merlim 9'38" (o.g.); Hozjan 28'45"

MartiniPlaza, Groningen
Attendance: 0
Referee: Juan José Cordero Gallardo (Spain), Alejandro Martinez Flores (Spain)
24 January 2022
20:30

Finland	2–6	Kazakhstan
Hosio 12'39"; Korpela 23'18"	Report	Orazov 17'02", 31'03"; Higuita 24'06"; Knaub 28'55", 33'09"; Valiullin 39'41"

MartiniPlaza, Groningen
Attendance: 0
Referee: Gábor Kovács (Hungary), Vladimir Kadykov (Russia)

28 January 2022
17:30

Slovenia	1–2	Finland
Hozjan 37'54"	Report	Jyrkiäinen 32'11"; Savolainen 34'44"

Ziggo Dome, Amsterdam
Attendance: 1,250
Referee: Cédric Pelissier (France), Victor Chaix (France)
28 January 2022
17:30

Kazakhstan	4–1	Italy
Orazov 5'32", 30'00"; Valiullin 8'16"; Douglas Júnior 37"06""	Report	Nicolodi 12'31""

MartiniPlaza, Groningen
Attendance: 395
Referee: Cristiano José Cardoso Santos (Portugal), Vladimir Kadykov (Russia)

=== Group C ===
Pos	Team	Pld	W	D	L	GF	GA	GD	Pts	Qualification
1	Russia	3	3	0	0	16	2	+14	9	Knockout stage
2	Slovakia	3	1	1	1	8	12	−4	4	Knockout stage
3	Croatia	3	1	0	2	6	10	−4	3	
4	Poland	3	0	1	2	4	10	−6	1	

Source: UEFA
Rules for classification: Tiebreakers
21 January 2022
17:30

Russia	7–1	Slovakia
Antoshkin 9'58", 22'54", 29'35"; Sokolov 10'21", 34'30"; Robinho 28'16"; Milovanov 36'33"	Report	Kozár 2'17"

Ziggo Dome, Amsterdam
Attendance: 0
Referee: Grigori Ošomkov (Estonia), Viktor Bugenko (Moldova)
21 January 2022
20:30

Poland	1–3	Croatia
Hoły 13'25"	Report	Horvat 7'19"; Sekulić 13'40"; Jelovčić 17'17"

Ziggo Dome, Amsterdam
Attendance: 0
Referee: Eduardo Fernandes Coelho (Portugal), Miguel Castilho (Portugal)

25 January 2022
17:30

Croatia	0–4	Russia
	Report	Antoshkin 2'33", 25'55"; Paulinho 11'11"; Chishkala 19'15"

Ziggo Dome, Amsterdam
Attendance: 0
Referee: Victor Chaix (France), Cédric Pelissier (France)
25 January 2022
20:30

Poland	2–2	Slovakia
Kriezel 6'24"; Hoły 32'35"	Report	Ševčík 24'38"; Drahovský 27'43"

Ziggo Dome, Amsterdam
Attendance: 0
Referee: Viktor Bugenko (Moldova), Grigori Ošomkov (Estonia)

29 January 2022
14:30

Slovakia	5–3	Croatia
Směřička 7'20", 34'12"; Kozár 19'44"; Drahovský 20'06", 27'04" (pen.)	Report	Postružin 14'13"; Horvat 35'05"; Jelovčić 37'54"

MartiniPlaza, Groningen
Attendance: 670
Referee: Grigori Ošomkov (Estonia), Viktor Bugenko (Moldova)
29 January 2022
14:30

Russia	5–1	Poland
Sokolov 5'42"; Davydov 15'31"; Chishkala 21'11", 28'20"; Milovanov 36'44"	Report	Leszczak 19'24" (pen.)

Ziggo Dome, Amsterdam
Attendance: 1,250
Referee: David Urdánoz Apezteguía (Spain), Kamil Çetin (Turkey)

=== Group D ===
Pos	Team	Pld	W	D	L	GF	GA	GD	Pts	Qualification
1	Spain	3	2	1	0	15	3	+12	7	Knockout stage
2	Georgia	3	2	0	1	5	11	−6	6	Knockout stage
3	Azerbaijan	3	1	1	1	8	7	+1	4	
4	Bosnia and Herzegovina	3	0	0	3	4	11	−7	0	

Source: UEFA
Rules for classification: Tiebreakers
22 January 2022
14:30

Georgia	3–2	Azerbaijan
Elisandro 9'31"; Sebiskveradze 26'54"; Thales 31'30" (pen.)	Report	Vilela 5'14", 6'26"

MartiniPlaza, Groningen
Attendance: 0
Referee: Cédric Pelissier (France), Daniel Matkovic (Switzerland)
22 January 2022
17:30

Spain	5–1	Bosnia and Herzegovina
Raúl Gómez 2'39"; Campos 8'14"; Sergio Lozano 17'10"; Ortiz 20'56", 36'14"	Report	Bošković 11'30"

MartiniPlaza, Groningen
Attendance: 0
Referee: Nicola Manzione (Italy), Chiara Perona (Italy)

26 January 2022
17:30

Bosnia and Herzegovina	1–2	Georgia
Kahvedžić 6'19"	Report	Thales 24'59"; Petry Branco 27'47"

MartiniPlaza, Groningen
Attendance: 46
Referee: Kamil Çetin (Turkey), Vedran Babić (Croatia)
26 January 2022
20:30

Spain	2–2	Azerbaijan
Raúl Gómez 11'28"; Sergio Lozano 30'31"	Report	Sergio Lozano 9'16" (o.g.); Atayev 16'38"

MartiniPlaza, Groningen
Attendance: 80
Referee: Miguel Castilho (Portugal), Gábor Kovács (Hungary)

29 January 2022
17:30

Georgia	0–8	Spain
	Report	Borja 8'28"; Sergio Lozano 16'33" (pen.); Chino 19'49"; Solano 21'00"; Todua 22'26" (o.g.); Cecílio 26'52"; Adolfo 31'17", 38'49"

MartiniPlaza, Groningen
Attendance: 437
Referee: Andřej Černý (Czech Republic), Vedran Babic (Croatia)
29 January 2022
17:30

Azerbaijan	4–2	Bosnia and Herzegovina
Bolinha 6'22"; Eduardo 10'02"; Vilela 32'35"; Gallo 39'52"	Report	Radmilović 11'50" (pen.); Kahvedžić 31'20"

Ziggo Dome, Amsterdam
Attendance: 1,250
Referee: Daniel Matkovic (Switzerland), David Grøndal Nissen (Denmark)

== Knockout stage ==
In the knockout stage, extra time and penalty shoot-out are used to decide the winner if necessary, except for the third place match where extra time is not played but a direct penalty shoot-out is used, instead.

=== Bracket ===
Quarter-finals
31 January – Amsterdam
Portugal	3
Finland	2
1 February – Amsterdam
Spain	5
Slovakia	1
31 January – Amsterdam
Kazakhstan	3
Ukraine	5
1 February – Amsterdam
Russia	3
Georgia	1

Semi-finals
4 February – Amsterdam
Portugal	3
Spain	2
4 February – Amsterdam
Ukraine	2
Russia	3

Final
6 February – Amsterdam
Portugal	4
Russia	2
Third place match
6 February – Amsterdam
Spain	4
Ukraine	1

=== Quarter-finals ===
31 January 2022
17:00

Portugal	3–2	Finland
Afonso Jesus 3'38", 14'47"; Miguel Ângelo 29'14"	Report	Hosio 9'30"; Autio 26'54"

Ziggo Dome, Amsterdam
Attendance: 554
Referee: Gábor Kovács (Hungary), Cédric Pelissier (France)

31 January 2022
20:00

Kazakhstan	3–5	Ukraine
Douglas Júnior 33'52"; Orazov 37'56", 39'16"	Report	Shoturma 14'07"; Korsun 24'51"; Zvarych 29'40"; Razuvanov 38'19"; Lebid 38'44"

Ziggo Dome, Amsterdam
Attendance: 1,250
Referee: Juan José Cordero Gallardo (Spain), Alejandro Martinez Flores (Spain)

1 February 2022
17:00

Russia	3–1	Georgia
Niyazov 22'08"; Chishkala 27'32", 39'54"	Report	Petry Branco 23'40"

Ziggo Dome, Amsterdam
Attendance: 1,250
Referee: Ondřej Černý (Czech Republic), Jan Kresta (Czech Republic)

1 February 2022
20:00

Spain	5–1	Slovakia
Mellado 1'36", 23'41"; Sergio Lozano 9'22"; Campos 15'32", 34'22"	Report	Serbin 33'48"

Ziggo Dome, Amsterdam
Attendance: 1,250
Referee: Nicola Manzione (Italy), Chiara Perona (Italy)

=== Semi-finals ===
4 February 2022
17:00

Ukraine	2–3	Russia
Siryi 15'25"; Abakshyn 34'31"	Report	Sokolov 1'16"; Afanasyev 14'31"; Niyazov 30'01"

Ziggo Dome, Amsterdam
Attendance: 1,250
Referee: Nicola Manzione (Italy), Cédric Pelissier (France)

4 February 2022
20:00

Portugal	3–2	Spain
Bruno Coelho 28'56" (pen.); Zicky Té 31'10", 38'41"	Report	Raúl Gómez 0'17"; Chino 12'35"

Ziggo Dome, Amsterdam
Attendance: 1,250
Referee: Nikola Jelić (Croatia), Vedran Babić (Croatia)

=== Third place match ===
6 February 2022
14:30

Spain	4–1	Ukraine
Mellado 10'46"; Solano 17'54"; Boyis 30'40"; Adolfo 31'06"	Report	Cherniavskyi 16'52"

Ziggo Dome, Amsterdam
Attendance: 1,250
Referee: Eduardo Fernandes Coelho (Portugal), Cristiano José Cardoso Santos (Portugal)

=== Final ===
6 February 2022
17:30

Portugal	4–2	Russia
Tomás Paçó 18'39"; André Coelho 26'45", 31'16"; Pany Varela 39'59"	Report	Sokolov 9'49"; Afanasyev 12'45"

Ziggo Dome, Amsterdam
Attendance: 1,250
Referee: Juan José Cordero Gallardo (Spain), Alejandro Martinez Flores (Spain)

2022 UEFA Futsal Euro champions

Portugal
2nd title

== Tournament ranking ==
Per statistical convention in football, matches decided in extra time are counted as wins and losses, while matches decided by penalty shoot-out are counted as draws.

Pos	Team	Pld	W	D	L	GF	GA	GD	Pts	Final result
1	Portugal	6	6	0	0	19	9	+10	18	Champions
2	Russia	6	5	0	1	24	9	+15	15	Runners-up
3	Spain	6	4	1	1	26	8	+18	13	Third place
4	Ukraine	6	2	0	4	16	15	+1	6	Fourth place
5	Kazakhstan	4	2	1	1	17	12	+5	7	Eliminated in Quarter-finals
6	Georgia	4	2	0	2	6	14	–8	6	Eliminated in Quarter-finals
7	Finland	4	1	1	2	9	13	–4	4	Eliminated in Quarter-finals
8	Slovakia	4	1	1	2	9	17	–8	4	Eliminated in Quarter-finals
9	Azerbaijan	3	1	1	1	8	7	+1	4	Eliminated in Group stage
10	Netherlands	3	1	0	2	6	9	–3	3	Eliminated in Group stage
11	Croatia	3	1	0	2	6	10	–4	3	Eliminated in Group stage
12	Serbia	3	1	0	2	6	12	–6	3	Eliminated in Group stage
13	Slovenia	3	0	2	1	7	8	–1	2	Eliminated in Group stage
14	Italy	3	0	2	1	6	9	–3	2	Eliminated in Group stage
15	Poland	3	0	1	2	4	10	–6	1	Eliminated in Group stage
16	Bosnia and Herzegovina	3	0	0	3	4	11	–7	0	Eliminated in Group stage

== Tournament music ==
Two songs were selected as the official tracks of the tournament:

- Blasterjaxx – God Mode (Official Futsal ’22 Kick-Off Tune)
- MadBoys - We Made It (Official Futsal '22 GoalTune)
