= UEFA Futsal Championship =

- Organiser(s): UEFA
- Founded: 1996
- Region: Europe
- Teams: 46 (qualifiers); 16 (finals)
- Qualifier for: Futsal Finalissima
- Current champions: Spain (8th title)
- Most championships: Spain (8 titles)
- Website: uefa.com/futsaleuro
- UEFA Futsal Euro 2026

The UEFA European Futsal Championship is the main futsal competition of the men's national futsal teams governed by UEFA (the Union of European Football Associations).

== History ==
The first tournament was held in Spain in 1996 and featured only six teams. The tournament was expanded to eight teams in 1999 and held every two years, and further to 12 teams in 2010.

After 2018, the tournament was expanded to 16 teams and held every four years, to avoid leap years when the FIFA Futsal World Cup is being played. The first 16-team tournament was held in 2022 in the Netherlands.

== Qualification ==
1. 1996 UEFA Futsal Championship qualifying (Link)
2. 1999 UEFA Futsal Championship qualifying (Link)
3. 2001 UEFA Futsal Championship qualifying (Link)
4. 2003 UEFA Futsal Championship qualifying (Link)
5. 2005 UEFA Futsal Championship qualifying (Link)
6. 2007 UEFA Futsal Championship qualifying (Link)
7. 2010 UEFA Futsal Championship qualifying
8. UEFA Futsal Euro 2012 qualifying
9. UEFA Futsal Euro 2014 qualifying
10. UEFA Futsal Euro 2016 qualifying
11. UEFA Futsal Euro 2018 qualifying
12. UEFA Futsal Euro 2022 qualifying
13. UEFA Futsal Euro 2026 qualifying

== Editions ==
#	Year	Host	Final			Third place match			Teams
#	Year	Host	Champions	Score	Runners-up	Third place	Score	Fourth place	Teams
1	1996; Details	Spain	Spain	5–3	Russia	Belgium	3–2 (a.e.t.)	Italy	6 (18)
2	1999; Details	Spain	Russia	3–3 (a.e.t.); 4–2 (p)	Spain	Italy	3–0	Netherlands	8 (25)
3	2001; Details	Russia	Spain	2–1 (a.e.t.)	Ukraine	Russia	2–1 (a.e.t.)	Italy	8 (26)
4	2003; Details	Italy	Italy	1–0	Ukraine	Czech Republic	By Points	Spain	8 (29)
5	2005; Details	Czech Republic	Spain	2–1	Russia	Italy	3–1	Ukraine	8 (34)
6	2007; Details	Portugal	Spain	3–1	Italy	Russia	3–2	Portugal	8 (34)
7	2010; Details	Hungary	Spain	4–2	Portugal	Czech Republic	5–3	Azerbaijan	12 (39)
8	2012; Details	Croatia	Spain	3–1 (a.e.t.)	Russia	Italy	3–1	Croatia	12 (43)
9	2014; Details	Belgium	Italy	3–1	Russia	Spain	8–4	Portugal	12 (45)
10	2016; Details	Serbia	Spain	7–3	Russia	Kazakhstan	5–2	Serbia	12 (47)
11	2018; Details	Slovenia	Portugal	3–2 (a.e.t.)	Spain	Russia	1–0	Kazakhstan	12 (47)
12	2022; Details	Netherlands	Portugal	4–2	Russia	Spain	4–1	Ukraine	16 (50)
13	2026; Details	Latvia / Lithuania / Slovenia	Spain	5–3	Portugal	Croatia	5–5 (6–5 p)	France	16 (50)

== Debut of teams ==
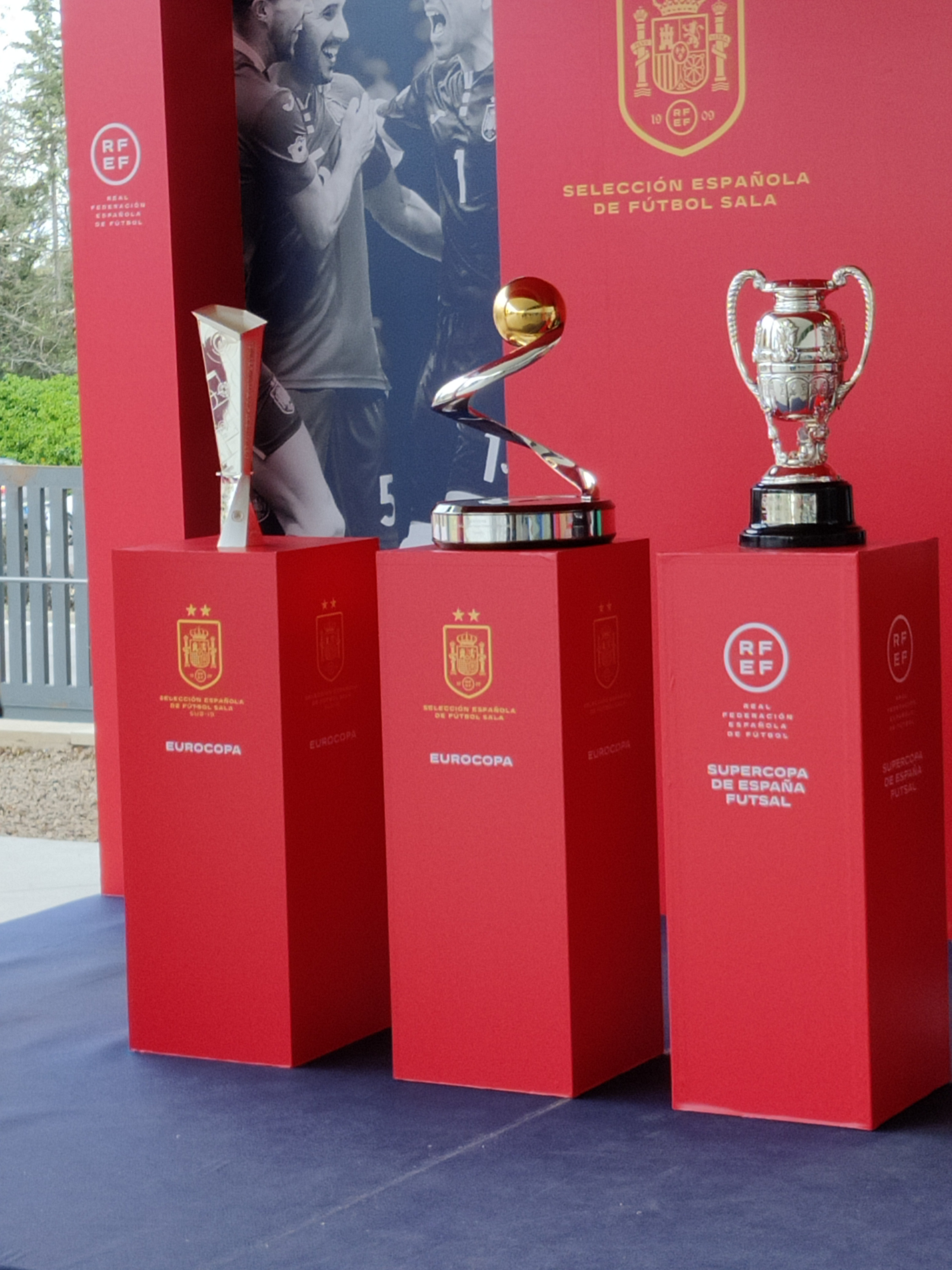
Trophy

Year	Debuting teams			Successor teams
Year	Teams	No.	CT	Successor teams
1996	Belgium, Italy, Netherlands, Russia, Spain, Ukraine	6	6	
1999	Croatia, Portugal, Yugoslavia	3	9	
2001	Czech Republic, Poland	2	11	
2003	Slovenia	1	12	
2005	Hungary	1	13	
2007	Romania	1	14	Serbia
2010	Azerbaijan, Belarus	2	16	
2012	Turkey	1	17	
2014	–	0	17	
2016	Kazakhstan	1	18	
2018	France	1	19	
2022	Bosnia and Herzegovina, Finland, Georgia, Slovakia	4	23	
2026	Armenia, Latvia, Lithuania	3	26	

== Performance by nations ==
Team	Champions	Runners-up	Third-place	Fourth-place	Semi-finalists	Total
Spain	8 (1996*, 2001, 2005, 2007, 2010, 2012, 2016, 2026)	2 (1999*, 2018)	2 (2014, 2022)	–	1 (2003)	13
Portugal	2 (2018, 2022)	2 (2010, 2026)	–	2 (2007*, 2014)	–	6
Italy	2 (2003*, 2014)	1 (2007)	3 (1999, 2005, 2012)	2 (1996, 2001)	–	8
Russia	1 (1999)	6 (1996, 2005, 2012, 2014, 2016, 2022)	3 (2001*, 2007, 2018)	–	–	10
Ukraine	–	2 (2001, 2003)	–	2 (2005, 2022)	–	4
Croatia	–	–	1 (2026)	1 (2012*)	–	2
Kazakhstan	–	–	1 (2016)	1 (2018)	–	2
Czech Republic	–	–	1 (2010)	–	1 (2003)	2
Belgium	–	–	1 (1996)	–	–	1
Netherlands	–	–	–	1 (1999)	–	1
Azerbaijan	–	–	–	1 (2010)	–	1
Serbia	–	–	–	1 (2016*)	–	1
France	–	–	–	1 (2026)	–	1

* = hosts

== Comprehensive team results by tournament ==
Legend

- 1st – Champions
- 2nd – Runners-up
- 3rd – Third place
- 4th – Fourth place
- SF – Semi-finalists
- 5th–8th – Fifth to Eighth place
- 9th–12th – Ninth to Twelfth place
- Q – Qualified for upcoming tournament
- •• — Qualified but withdrew
- • — Did not qualify
- × — Did not enter
- × – Withdrew from the European Championship / Banned / Entry not accepted by FIFA
- — Country not affiliated to UEFA at that time
- — Country did not exist or national team was inactive
- — Hosts

Team	1996 (Spain) (6)	1999 (Spain) (8)	2001 (Russia) (8)	2003 (Italy) (8)	2005 (Czech Republic) (8)	2007 (Portugal) (8)	2010 (Hungary) (12)	2012 (Croatia) (12)	2014 (Belgium) (12)	2016 (Serbia) (12)	2018 (Slovenia) (12)	2022 (Netherlands) (16)	2026 (Latvia) (Lithuania) (Slovenia) (16)	Years
Armenia	×	×	×	•	•	•	•	•	•	•	•	•	QF	1
Azerbaijan	•	•	•	•	•	•	4th	10th	9th	8th	7th	9th	•	6
Belarus	•	•	•	•	•	•	9th	•	•	•	•	•	12th	2
Belgium	3rd	8th	•	7th	•	•	9th	•	10th	•	•	•	QF	6
Bosnia and Herzegovina	×	•	•	•	•	•	•	•	•	•	•	16th	•	1
Croatia	•	5th	5th	•	•	•	•	4th	8th	9th	•	11th	3rd	7
Czech Republic	•	•	6th	SF	5th	8th	3rd	9th	11th	11th	•	•	14th	9
Finland	×	•	•	•	•	•	•	•	•	•	•	7th	•	1
France	×	•	•	•	•	•	•	•	•	•	10th	•	4th	2
Georgia	•	•	•	•	•	•	•	•	•	•	•	6th	15th	2
Hungary	•	•	•	•	5th	•	9th	•	•	10th	•	•	9th	4
Italy	4th	3rd	4th	1st	3rd	2nd	5th	3rd	1st	5th	9th	14th	QF	13
Kazakhstan				•	•	•	•	•	•	3rd	4th	5th	•	3
Latvia	×	•	•	•	•	•	•	•	•	•	•	•	11th	1
Lithuania	×	•	•	•	•	•	•	•	•	•	•	•	13th	1
Netherlands	6th	4th	7th	•	5th	•	•	•	12th	•	•	10th	•	6
Poland	•	•	8th	•	•	•	•	•	•	•	11th	15th	16th	4
Portugal	•	6th	•	5th	5th	4th	2nd	5th	4th	7th	1st	1st	2nd	11
Romania	×	×	×	×	•	6th	•	7th	6th	•	12th	•	•	4
Russia	2nd	1st	3rd	6th	2nd	3rd	5th	2nd	2nd	2nd	3rd	2nd	×	12
Serbia						5th	5th	6th	•	4th	8th	12th	•	6 (7)
Slovakia	•	•	•	•	•	•	•	•	•	•	•	8th	•	1
Slovenia	•	•	•	8th	•	•	9th	11th	7th	12th	5th	13th	10th	8
Spain	1st	2nd	1st	SF	1st	1st	1st	1st	3rd	1st	2nd	3rd	1st	13
Turkey	×	×	×	×	×	×	•	12th	•	•	•	•	•	1
Ukraine	5th	•	2nd	2nd	4th	7th	5th	8th	5th	6th	6th	4th	QF	12
Yugoslavia	•	7th	•	•	•									1 (7)

== Summary (1996–2026) ==
As of UEFA Futsal Euro 2026

Rank	Team	Part	M	W	D	L	GF	GA	GD	Points
1	Spain	13	65	49	11	5	254	102	+152	158
2	Russia	12	56	34	7	15	178	114	+64	109
3	Italy	13	54	30	10	14	154	99	+55	100
4	Portugal	11	47	26	7	14	153	117	+36	85
5	Ukraine	12	46	16	6	24	123	119	+4	54
6	Serbia	7	23	8	5	10	54	66	–12	29
7	Croatia	7	24	7	7	10	54	69	–15	28
8	Kazakhstan	3	14	7	3	4	49	34	+15	24
9	Azerbaijan	6	18	6	3	9	56	72	–16	21
10	Czech Republic	9	27	5	4	18	74	123	–49	19
11	France	2	8	3	3	2	27	23	+4	12
12	Netherlands	6	19	3	3	13	39	71	–32	12
13	Slovenia	8	21	3	3	15	44	79	–35	12
14	Belgium	6	18	3	3	12	30	65	–35	12
15	Romania	4	11	3	0	8	25	40	–15	9
16	Armenia	1	4	2	1	1	10	11	-1	7
17	Georgia	2	7	2	1	4	9	23	–15	7
18	Finland	1	4	1	1	2	9	13	–4	4
19	Slovakia	1	4	1	1	2	9	17	–8	4
20	Belarus	2	5	1	1	3	9	22	–14	4
21	Hungary	4	10	1	1	8	23	43	–20	4
22	Latvia	1	3	1	0	2	5	9	–4	3
23	Lithuania	1	3	0	2	1	7	10	–3	2
24	Poland	4	11	0	2	9	16	45	–29	2
25	Bosnia and Herzegovina	1	3	0	0	3	4	11	–7	0
26	Turkey	1	2	0	0	2	1	8	–7	0

== Medals (1996–2026) ==
Rank	Nation	Gold	Silver	Bronze	Total
1	Spain	8	2	2	12
2	Portugal	2	2	0	4
3	Italy	2	1	3	6
4	Russia	1	6	3	10
5	Ukraine	0	2	0	2
6	Czech Republic	0	0	2	2
7	Belgium	0	0	1	1
7	Croatia	0	0	1	1
7	Kazakhstan	0	0	1	1
Totals (9 entries)		13	13	13	39

== FIFA Futsal World Cup qualifiers ==
Legend

- 1st – Champions
- 2nd – Runners-up
- 3rd – Third place
- 4th – Fourth place
- QF – Quarterfinals
- R2 – Round 2 (1989–2008, second group stage, top 8; 2012–present: knockout round of 16)
- R1 – Round 1
- – Hosts
- – Not an UEFA member
- Q – Qualified for upcoming tournament

Team	(Netherlands) 1989	(Hong Kong) 1992	(Spain) 1996	(Guatemala) 2000	(Chinese Taipei) 2004	(Brazil) 2008	(Thailand) 2012	(Colombia) 2016	(Lithuania) 2021	(Uzbekistan) 2024	2028	Total
Azerbaijan								QF				1
Belgium	4th	R2	R2									3
Croatia				R2								1
Czech Republic					R2	R1	R2		R2			4
Denmark	R1											1
France										4th		1
Hungary	R1											1
Italy	R2	R1	R2		2nd	3rd	3rd	R2				7
Kazakhstan								R2	4th	QF		3
Lithuania									R1			1
Netherlands	2nd	R2	R2	R2						R2		5
Poland		R2										1
Portugal				3rd	R2	R1	QF	4th	1st	R2		7
Russia		R1	3rd	4th		4th	QF	2nd	QF			7
Serbia							R2		R2			2
Spain	R1	3rd	2nd	1st	1st	2nd	2nd	QF	QF	R2		10
Ukraine			4th		R2	R2	QF	R2		3rd		6

== See also ==
- UEFA Women's Futsal Championship
- UEFA Under-21 Futsal Championship
- UEFA Under-19 Futsal Championship
- Futsal Finalissima
- UEFA Futsal Champions League
- Futsal European Clubs Championship
- European Futsal Cup Winners Cup
- European Women's Futsal Tournament
- European Universities Futsal Championships
- UEFS Futsal Men's Championship
- UEFS Futsal Women's Championship
- European Minifootball Federation
- EMF EURO
