= 2010 UEFA Futsal Championship squads =

This article lists the confirmed national futsal squads for the 2010 UEFA Futsal Championship tournament held in Hungary, between January 19 and January 30, 2010.

== Group A ==
=== Azerbaijan ===
Head coach: Alesio

No.	Pos.	Player	Date of birth (age)	Caps	Goals	Club
12	GK	Marat Salyanski	29 May 1974 (aged 35)			
1	GK	Andrey Tveryankin	6 March 1967 (aged 42)			
14	DF	Vitaliy Borisov	5 July 1982 (aged 27)			
8	DF	Rizvan Farzaliyev	1 September 1979 (aged 30)			
5	DF	Felipe	5 October 1978 (aged 31)			
10	DF	Biro Jade	24 January 1973 (aged 36)			
9	DF	Thiago	26 August 1981 (aged 28)			
4	DF	Serjão	18 September 1979 (aged 30)			
3	FW	Sergey Chuykov	4 September 1980 (aged 29)			
6	FW	Alves	26 June 1984 (aged 25)			
7	FW	Rajab Farajzade	19 December 1980 (aged 29)			
11	FW	Namig Mammadkarimov	21 July 1980 (aged 29)			

=== Czech Republic ===
Head coach: Tomáš Neumann

No.	Pos.	Player	Date of birth (age)	Caps	Goals	Club
12	GK	Libor Gerčák				
1	GK	Tomáš Meller				
2	DF	Vít Blažej				
9	DF	David Frič				
3	DF	Josef Havel				
8	DF	Marek Kopecký				
4	DF	Radovan Kroulík				
6	DF	Jiří Novotný				
11	FW	Michal Belej				
7	FW	Martin Dlouhý				
14	FW	Jan Janovský				
5	FW	Radek Polášek				
10	FW	Lukáš Rešetár				
13	FW	Zdeněk Sláma				

=== Hungary ===
Head coach: Mihály Kozma

No.	Pos.	Player	Date of birth (age)	Caps	Goals	Club
1	GK	Zoltán Balázs				
12	GK	Zoltán Reveland				
19	DF	András Angyalos				
8	DF	Norbert Lovas				
5	DF	Gábor Nagy				
18	DF	Tamás Norbert Nagy				
9	DF	Péter Pál Sivák				
2	DF	Szabolcs Tóth				
6	DF	János Trencsényi				
14	FW	Zoltán Dróth				
13	FW	Zsolt Gyurcsányi				
7	FW	Tamás Lódi				
11	FW	János Madarász				
15	FW	Csaba Peczár				

== Group B ==
=== Italy ===
Head coach: Roberto Menichelli

No.	Pos.	Player	Date of birth (age)	Caps	Goals	Club
1	GK	Alexandre Feller				
12	GK	Stefano Mammarella				
5	DF	Vincenzo Botta				
16	DF	Gabriel De Oliveira Lima				
2	MF	Marco Ercolessi				
3	DF	Marcio Venicius Forte				
10	FW	Luca Ippoliti				
14	DF	Patrick Nora				
8	DF	Vinicius Omori Duarte				
11	MF	Saad Assis				
7	FW	Vinicius Bácaro				
9	FW	Clayton Baptistella				
13	FW	Cristian Rizzo				
4	DF	Sergio Romano				

=== Ukraine ===
Head coach: Gennadiy Lysenchuk

No.	Pos.	Player	Date of birth (age)	Caps	Goals	Club
14	GK	Volodymyr Kardash				
12	GK	Vladyslav Kornyeyev				
1	GK	Vladyslav Lysenko				
7	DF	Serhiy Cheporniuk				
10	DF	Valeriy Legchanov				
8	DF	Denys Ovsyannikov				
9	DF	Valeriy Zamyatin				
4	FW	Dmytro Ivanov				
11	FW	Oleksandr Kondratyuk				
3	FW	Maxym Pavlenko				
5	FW	Yevgen Rogachov				
2	FW	Mykhaylo Romanov				
13	FW	Dmytro Silchenko				
6	FW	Yevgen Valyenko				

=== Belgium ===
Head coach: Benny Meurs

No.	Pos.	Player	Date of birth (age)	Caps	Goals	Club
1	GK	David Morant				
12	GK	Jonathan Paggetta				
2	DF	Mustapha Aabbassi				
15	DF	Jonathan Fossé				
14	DF	Zico				
13	DF	Jonathan Neukermans				
19	DF	Ahmed Sababti				
4	FW	Yassine Achahbar				
8	FW	Karim Bachar				
7	FW	Karim Chaibai				
6	FW	André				
10	FW	Marco Ferrian				
9	FW	Lúcio				
18	FW	Saad Salhi				

== Group C ==
=== Russia ===
Head coach: Sergei Skorovich

No.	Pos.	Player	Date of birth (age)	Caps	Goals	Club
1	GK	Gennadi Garagulya				
12	GK	Sergey Zuev				
7	DF	Pula				
14	DF	Damir Khamadiev				
10	DF	Konstantin Maevski				
9	FW	Denis Abyshev				
5	FW	Konstantin Agapov				
15	FW	Pavel Chistopolov				
3	FW	Aleksandr Fukin				
11	FW	Cirilo				
13	FW	Sergei Sergeev				
2	FW	Vladislav Shayakhmetov				
8	FW	Konstantin Timoschenkov				

=== Serbia ===
Head coach: Aca Kovačević

No.	Pos.	Player	Date of birth (age)	Caps	Goals	Club
12	GK	Vladimir Ranisavljević				
1	GK	Ivan Stojanović				
7	DF	Milan Bogdanović				
13	DF	Vidan Bojović				
5	DF	Bojan Pavicević				
10	DF	Aleksandar Tomin				
11	FW	Željko Borojević				
4	FW	Slobodan Janjić				
3	FW	Mladen Kocić				
9	FW	Vladimir Lazić				
6	FW	Vladimir Milosavac				
2	FW	Marko Perić				
14	FW	Slobodan Rajčević				
8	FW	Milan Rakić				

=== Slovenia ===
Head coach: Andrej Dobovičnik

No.	Pos.	Player	Date of birth (age)	Caps	Goals	Club
1	GK	Aljoša Mohorič				
12	GK	Alan Pertovt				
4	DF	Gorazd Drobnič				
3	DF	Igor Kragelj				
8	DF	Benjamin Melink				
2	DF	Miha Osojnik				
9	DF	Boštjan Uršič				
11	DF	Siniša Brkič				
5	DF	Kristjan Čujec				
6	FW	Slaviša Goranovič				
7	FW	Igor Osredkar				
10	FW	Danijel Pantič				
18	FW	Damir Pertič				
13	FW	Jaka Sovdat				

== Group D ==
=== Belarus ===
Head coach: Valeri Dosko

No.	Pos.	Player	Date of birth (age)	Caps	Goals	Club
12	GK	Andrei Halauniou				
1	GK	Artur Navoichik				
11	DF	Sergei Kuznetsov				
8	DF	Aleksandr Savintsev				
6	DF	Dmitri Yeliseev				
5	DF	Aleksei Yuraga				
2	FW	Aleksandr Chernik				
4	FW	Aleksandr Gayduk				
13	FW	Oleg Gorbenko				
3	FW	Anton Gusakov				
10	FW	Aleksandr Komarov				
9	FW	Vladimir Levus				
7	FW	Andrei Miranovich				
14	FW	Aleksei Popov				

=== Portugal ===
Head coach: Orlando Duarte

No.	Pos.	Player	Date of birth (age)	Caps	Goals	Club
14	GK	André Sousa				
1	GK	João Benedito				
12	GK	Bebé				
11	DF	João Matos				
9	DF	Gonçalo Alves				
8	DF	Israel Alves				
13	DF	Pedro Cary				
10	MF	Paulinho				
6	MF	Arnaldo Pereira				
4	MF	Pedro Costa				
2	MF	Evandro				
7	FW	Fernando Cardinal				
3	FW	Fernando Leitão				
5	FW	Joel Queirós				

=== Spain ===
Head coach: José Venancio López

No.	Pos.	Player	Date of birth (age)	Caps	Goals	Club
1	GK	Luis Amado				(Spain) Inter Movistar
12	GK	Juanjo				(Spain) ElPozo Murcia Turística
13	GK	Cristian Domínguez				(Spain) FC Barcelona
8	DF	Kike				(Spain) ElPozo Murcia Turística
3	DF	Javier Eseverri				(Spain) MRA Navarra
2	DF	Carlos Ortiz				(Spain) Inter Movistar
4	DF	Jordi Torrás				(Spain) Inter Movistar
6	FW	Álvaro				(Spain) ElPozo Murcia Turística
10	FW	Borja Blanco				(Spain) Inter Movistar
9	FW	Juanra				(Spain) Inter Movistar
14	FW	Daniel				(Spain) Inter Movistar
4	FW	Fernandao				(Spain) FC Barcelona
7	FW	Javi Rodríguez				(Spain) FC Barcelona
11	FW	Lin				(Spain) Caja Segovia
