= 2010 UEFA Futsal Championship =

2010-es futsal-Európa-bajnokság
- UEFA Futsal Championship Hungary 2010 logo

Tournament details
- Host country: Hungary
- Dates: 19–30 January
- Teams: 12 (from 1 confederation)
- Venues: 2 (in 2 host cities)

Final positions
- Champions: Spain (5th title)
- Runners-up: Portugal
- Third place: Czech Republic
- Fourth place: Azerbaijan

Tournament statistics
- Matches played: 20
- Goals scored: 127 (6.35 per match)
- Top scorer(s): (Azerbaijan) Biro Jade (Spain) Javi Rodríguez (Portugal) Joel Queirós (Italy) Saad Assis (5 goals each)
- Best player: (Spain) Javi Rodríguez

The 2010 UEFA Futsal Championship was the seventh official edition of the UEFA-governed European Championship for national futsal teams. It was hosted by Hungary, between January 19 and January 30, 2010, in two venues located in Budapest (Papp László Sportaréna) and Debrecen (Főnix Arena). For the first time, twelve teams competed in the final round, after a qualifying phase where eleven teams managed to join the Hungarian hosts.

Having won against Portugal in the group stage, the title holders Spain defeated them again in the final, 4–2, to claim a third consecutive and fifth overall title.

== Bids ==
The Hungarian bid was selected during a meeting of UEFA's Executive Committee, on November 30, 2007, in Lucerne, Switzerland. The bid was picked ahead of three other entries from Belgium (Charleroi and Antwerp), Bosnia and Herzegovina (Sarajevo) and Turkey (Istanbul).

== Qualification ==
Thirty-eight nations took part in the qualifying round, with hosts Hungary automatically qualified for the expanded 12-team final tournament.

Qualifying was played in two stages, with 16 sides competing in the preliminary round between 14 and 22 February 2009. The winners of the four groups and two best runners-up progressed to join the other 22 entrants in the next phase. In the main qualifying round, which took place between 19 and 22 March, there was seven groups of four with the first-placed teams and four best runners-up advancing to the final tournament.

=== Qualified teams ===
Country	Qualified as	Previous appearances in tournament^{1}
Hungary	Hosts	1 (2005)
Spain	Group 2 winner	6 (**1996**, 1999, **2001**, 2003, **2005**, **2007**)
Italy	Group 4 winner	6 (1996, 1999, 2001, **2003**, 2005, 2007)
Russia	Group 7 winner	6 (1996, **1999**, 2001, 2003, 2005, 2007)
Ukraine	Group 1 winner	5 (1996, 2001, 2003, 2005, 2007)
Portugal	Group 6 winner	4 (1999, 2003, 2005, 2007)
Czech Republic	Group 3 winner	4 (2001, 2003, 2005, 2007)
Serbia	Group 5 runner-up	2 (1999, 2007)
Slovenia	Group 7 runner-up	1 (2003)
Belgium	Group 5 winner	3 (1996, 1999, 2003)
Belarus	Group 4 runner-up	0 (debut)
Azerbaijan	Group 6 runner-up	0 (debut)

^{1} Bold indicates champion for that year

== Venues ==
Arena	Papp László Sportaréna	Főnix Arena
Picture	Papp László Budapest Sportaréna	Főnix Arena
City	Budapest	Debrecen
Capacity	12,500	8,500

== Squads ==
Each nation had to submit a squad of 14 players, at least two of which had to be goalkeepers. However, Azerbaijan were an exception, since they took part in the tournament with only 12 players.

== Final tournament ==
=== Group stage ===
==== Group A ====
Team	Pld	W	D	L	GF	GA	GD	Pts
Azerbaijan	2	2	0	0	9	2	+7	6
Czech Republic	2	1	0	1	7	11	−4	3
Hungary	2	0	0	2	6	9	−3	0

19 January 2010
17:30

Hungary	1–3	Azerbaijan
Lódi 3'	Report	Biro Jade 1'; Serjão 13'; Alves 17'

Papp László Aréna, Budapest
Attendance: 7,000
Referee: Massimo Cumbo (Italy)

21 January 2010
18:00

Azerbaijan	6–1	Czech Republic
Biro Jade 3', 38'; Borisov 8', 29'; Serjão 11'; Thiago 24'	Report	Rešetár 27'

Papp László Aréna, Budapest
Attendance: 2,200
Referee: Alexandr Remin (Belarus)

23 January 2010
20:30

Czech Republic	6–5	Hungary
Rešetár 26'; Belej 33'; Dlouhý 35', 39'; Frič 38'; Kopecký 40'	Report	Dróth 6', 25'; Lódi 10', 25'; Gyurcsányi 40'

Papp László Aréna, Budapest
Attendance: 7,066
Referee: Stephan Kammerer (Germany)

==== Group B ====
Team	Pld	W	D	L	GF	GA	GD	Pts
Italy	2	2	0	0	8	2	+6	6
Ukraine	2	1	0	1	6	6	0	3
Belgium	2	0	0	2	2	8	−6	0

19 January 2010
19:00

Italy	4–0	Belgium
Saad Assis 2', 23'; Ippoliti 23' (pen.); Baptistella 38'	Report

Főnix Arena, Debrecen
Attendance: 2,200
Referee: Karel Henych (Czech Republic)

21 January 2010
20:00

Belgium	2–4	Ukraine
Bachar 18', 40'	Report	Zamyatin 11'; Ovsyannikov 16'; Legchanov 20'; Pavlenko 35'

Főnix Arena, Debrecen
Referee: Borut Šivic (Slovenia)

23 January 2010
18:30

Ukraine	2–4	Italy
Cheporniuk 23'; Pavlenko 39'	Report	Baptistella 13', 28', 31'; Saad Assis 31'

Főnix Arena, Debrecen
Attendance: 2,500
Referee: Pascal Fritz (France)

==== Group C ====
Team	Pld	W	D	L	GF	GA	GD	Pts
Serbia	2	2	0	0	6	3	+3	6
Russia	2	1	0	1	8	5	+3	3
Slovenia	2	0	0	2	1	7	−6	0

20 January 2010
20:00

Russia	5–1	Slovenia
Chistopolov 4', 19'; Pula 19'; Khamadiyev 24'; Shayakhmetov 40'	Report	Čujec 37'

Papp László Aréna, Budapest
Attendance: 2,500
Referee: Marcelino Blázquez Sierra (Spain)

22 January 2010
18:00

Slovenia	0–2	Serbia
	Report	Rakić 21'; Janjić 29'

Papp László Aréna, Budapest
Attendance: 2,500
Referee: Petros Panayides (Cyprus)

24 January 2010
20:30

Serbia	4–3	Russia
Pavićević 30'; Perić 31'; Lazić 32'; Kocić 36'	Report	Chistopolov 17'; Maevski 22'; Perić 38' (o.g.)

Papp László Aréna, Budapest
Referee: Pascal Lemal (Belgium)

==== Group D ====
Team	Pld	W	D	L	GF	GA	GD	Pts
Spain	2	2	0	0	15	2	+13	6
Portugal	2	0	1	1	6	11	−5	1
Belarus	2	0	1	1	6	14	−8	1

20 January 2010
18:00

Spain	9–1	Belarus
Juanra 3', 35'; Kike 9'; Jordi Torras 28'; Javi Rodríguez 30', 31', 40'; Ortiz 32'; Lin 37'	Report	Levus 8'

Főnix Arena, Debrecen
Attendance: 500
Referee: Edi Šunjić (Croatia)

22 January 2010
20:00

Belarus	5–5	Portugal
Chernik 17'; Popov 26', 30', 40'; Gayduk 32'	Report	Cardinal 7', 37'; Joel 14', 32' (pen.); Arnaldo 39'

Főnix Arena, Debrecen
Referee: Jacek Ligienza (Poland)

24 January 2010
18:30

Portugal	1–6	Spain
Arnaldo 6'	Report	Jordi Torras 15', 16'; Juanra 24'; Kike 30'; Fernandão 32'; Lin 39'

Főnix Arena, Debrecen
Referee: Tommi Grönman (Finland)

=== Knockout stage ===
Quarter-finals
25 January – Budapest
Azerbaijan (pen.)	3 (4)
Ukraine	3 (2)
26 January – Budapest
Serbia	1
Portugal	5
25 January – Debrecen
Czech Republic (pen.)	3 (3)
Italy	3 (1)
26 January – Debrecen
Russia	0 (6)
Spain (pen.)	0 (7)

Semi-finals
28 January – Debrecen
Azerbaijan	3 (3)
Portugal (pen.)	3 (5)
28 January – Debrecen
Czech Republic	1
Spain	8

Final
30 January – Debrecen
Portugal	2
Spain	4
Third place
30 January – Debrecen
Azerbaijan	3
Czech Republic	5

==== Quarter-finals ====
25 January 2010
18:00

Czech Republic	3–3	Italy
Kopecký 8'; Sláma 24'; Duarte 28' (o.g.)	Report	Duarte 6'; Saad Assis 18', 33'
Penalties
Kopecký (penalty scored); Dlouhý (penalty scored); Rešetár (penalty missed); Frič (penalty scored)	3–1	(penalty missed) Saad Assis; (penalty missed) Bácaro; (penalty missed) Nora; (penalty scored) Duarte

Főnix Arena, Debrecen
Attendance: 1860
Referee: Oleg Ivanov (Ukraine)

25 January 2010
20:00

Azerbaijan	3–3	Ukraine
Farzaliyev 3'; Thiago 18'; Biro Jade 25'	Report	Romanov 1'; Cheporniuk 11'; Kondratyuk 34'
Penalties
Serjão (penalty scored); Thiago (penalty scored); Biro Jade (penalty scored); Farzaliyev (penalty scored)	4–2	(penalty scored) Zamyatin; (penalty scored) Romanov; (penalty missed) Pavlenko; (penalty missed) Cheporniuk

Papp László Aréna, Budapest
Attendance: 2207
Referee: Ivan Shabanov (Russia)

26 January 2010
17:30

Russia	0–0	Spain
	Report
Penalties
Pula (penalty scored); Maevskiy (penalty scored); Cirilo (penalty missed); Abyshev (penalty scored); Shayakhmetov (penalty scored); Sergeev (penalty scored); Fukin (penalty scored); Timoshchenkov (penalty missed)	6–7	(penalty scored) Daniel; (penalty scored) Kike; (penalty scored) Álvaro; (penalty scored) Jordi Torras; (penalty missed) Javi Rodríguez; (penalty scored) Juanra; (penalty scored) Borja; (penalty scored) Fernandão

Főnix Arena, Debrecen
Attendance: 2,045
Referee: Pascal Fritz (France)

26 January 2010
19:30

Serbia	1–5	Portugal
Bojović 37'	Report	Joel 13', 30'; Cardinal 23'; Leitão 34'; Arnaldo 39'

Papp László Aréna, Budapest
Attendance: 2843
Referee: Gábor Kovács (Hungary)

==== Semi-finals ====
28 January 2010
17:30

Azerbaijan	3–3	Portugal
Thiago 8'; Felipe 18'; Biro Jade 29'	Report	Cardinal 10'; João Matos 28'; Pedro Costa 29'
Penalties
Serjão (penalty scored); Thiago (penalty missed); Biro Jade (penalty scored); Farzaliyev (penalty scored)	3–5	(penalty scored) Joel; (penalty scored) Cardinal; (penalty scored) Leitão; (penalty scored) Pedro Costa; (penalty scored) Gonçalo

Főnix Arena, Debrecen
Attendance: 2840
Referee: Borut Šivic (Slovenia)

28 January 2010
20:00

Czech Republic	1–8	Spain
Dlouhý 39'	Report	Javi Rodríguez 5'; Ortiz 7', 17'; Luis Amado 20'; Borja 26'; Fernandão 33'; Daniel 37', 39'

Főnix Arena, Debrecen
Attendance: 3,269
Referee: Ivan Shabanov (Russia)

==== Third place play-off ====
30 January 2010
18:00

Azerbaijan	3–5	Czech Republic
Borisov 8'; Serjão 19'; Farajzadeh 38'	Report	Belej 1'; Sláma 24'; Farzaliyev 26' (o.g.); Novotný 36'; Kopecký 40'

Főnix Arena, Debrecen
Attendance: 3603
Referee: Oleg Ivanov (Ukraine)

==== Final ====
30 January 2010
20:30

Portugal	2–4	Spain
Gonçalo 38'; Joel 39'	Report	Ortiz 9'; Javi Rodríguez 13'; Lin 36'; Daniel 40'

Főnix Arena, Debrecen
Attendance: 4,845
Referee: Massimo Cumbo (Italy)

== Champions ==
2010 UEFA Futsal Championship winners

Spain
Fifth title

== Tournament ranking ==
Per statistical convention in football, matches decided in extra time are counted as wins and losses, while matches decided by penalty shoot-out are counted as draws.

Pos	Team	Pld	W	D	L	GF	GA	GD	Pts	Final result
1	Spain	5	4	1	0	27	5	+22	13	Champions
2	Portugal	5	1	2	2	16	19	-3	5	Runners-up
3	Czech Republic	5	2	1	2	16	25	-9	7	Third place
4	Azerbaijan	5	2	2	1	18	13	+5	8	Fourth place
5	Italy	3	2	1	0	11	5	+6	7	Eliminated in Quarter-finals
6	Serbia	3	2	0	1	7	8	–1	6	Eliminated in Quarter-finals
7	Russia	3	1	1	1	8	5	+3	4	Eliminated in Quarter-finals
8	Ukraine	3	1	1	1	9	9	0	4	Eliminated in Quarter-finals
9	Belarus	2	0	1	1	6	14	–8	1	Eliminated in Group stage
10	Hungary	2	0	0	2	6	9	–3	0	Eliminated in Group stage
11	Belgium	2	0	0	2	2	8	–6	0	Eliminated in Group stage
12	Slovenia	2	0	0	2	1	7	–6	0	Eliminated in Group stage

== Awards ==
Golden Boot
(Azerbaijan) Biro Jade (Spain) Javi Rodríguez (Portugal) Joel Queirós (Italy) Saad Assis	5 goals

== Top goalscorers ==
Scorer	Nation	Goals
Biro Jade	Azerbaijan	5
Javi Rodríguez	Spain	5
Joel Queirós	Portugal	5
Saad Assis	Italy	5
Clayton Baptistella	Italy	4
Cardinal	Portugal	4
Ortiz	Spain	4
Arnaldo	Portugal	3
Pavel Chistopolov	Russia	3
Daniel	Spain	3
Martin Dlouhý	Czech Republic	3
Juanra	Spain	3
Marek Kopecký	Czech Republic	3
Lin	Spain	3
Tamás Lódi	Hungary	3
Aleksei Popov	Belarus	3
Serjão	Azerbaijan	3
Thiago	Azerbaijan	3
Jordi Torras	Spain	3
