= UEFA Futsal Euro 2014 squads =

This article lists the confirmed national futsal squads for the UEFA Futsal Euro 2014 tournament held in Belgium, between January 28 and February 8, 2014.

== Group A ==
=== Belgium ===
Head coach: Alain Dopchie

No.	Pos.	Player	Date of birth (age)	Caps	Goals	Club
12	GK	Pietro Benetti	19 May 1988 (aged 25)	0	0	(Belgium) Futsal Hasselt
1	GK	David Morant	24 December 1977 (aged 36)	9	0	(France) Paris Metropole
5	DF	Ahmed Sababti	10 December 1985 (aged 28)	5	0	(Belgium) Futsal Topsport Antwerpen
8	DF	Liliu	16 April 1979 (aged 34)	0	0	(Belgium) Châtelineau Futsal
13	DF	Jonathan Neukermans	12 April 1983 (aged 30)	10	0	(Belgium) FP Asse-Gooik
11	MF	Abdelhak El Ghaadaoui	12 April 1992 (aged 21)	0	0	(Belgium) Futsal Topsport Antwerpen
2	FW	Valentin Dujacquier	23 July 1989 (aged 24)	3	2	(Belgium) Châtelineau Futsal
3	FW	Mustapha Harram	29 April 1981 (aged 32)	3	1	(Belgium) Futsal Topsport Antwerpen
4	FW	Omar Rahou	19 July 1992 (aged 21)	0	0	(Belgium) Châtelineau Futsal
6	FW	Lúcio	4 July 1975 (aged 38)	5	0	(Belgium) Châtelineau Futsal
7	FW	Karim Chaibai	5 October 1982 (aged 31)	8	8	(Belgium) Châtelineau Futsal
9	FW	Saad Salhi	14 May 1987 (aged 26)	1	0	(Belgium) Action 21 Charleroi
10	FW	Aziz Hitou	1 February 1990 (aged 23)	2	3	(Belgium) Futsal Topsport Antwerpen
14	FW	Reda Dahbi	26 June 1981 (aged 32)	3	0	(Belgium) Futsal Hasselt

=== Romania ===
Head coach: Nelu Stancea

No.	Pos.	Player	Date of birth (age)	Caps	Goals	Club
1	GK	Vlad Iancu	3 January 1978 (aged 36)	9	0	(Romania) AutoBergamo Deva
12	GK	Andrei Grigoraș	15 May 1989 (aged 24)	5	0	(Romania) Sfântu Gheorghe
4	DF	Florin Ignat	26 February 1982 (aged 31)	10	2	(Romania) City'us Târgu Mureş
8	DF	Marian Șotărcă	12 November 1980 (aged 33)	11	5	(Romania) Dunărea Călărași
9	DF	Ion Al-Ioani	7 May 1983 (aged 30)	17	3	(Romania) City'us Târgu Mureş
23	DF	Ionuț Movileanu	10 September 1991 (aged 22)	0	0	(Romania) Dunărea Călărași
2	FW	Florin Matei	8 December 1983 (aged 30)	20	26	(Romania) AutoBergamo Deva
6	FW	Emil Răducu	19 May 1984 (aged 29)	17	2	(Malta) Balzan FC
7	FW	Robert Lupu	28 October 1982 (aged 31)	23	13	(Romania) AutoBergamo Deva
10	FW	Dumitru Stoica	30 September 1981 (aged 32)	15	4	(Romania) City'us Târgu Mureş
11	FW	Cosmin Gherman	25 April 1984 (aged 29)	17	16	(Romania) City'us Târgu Mureş
14	FW	Cristian Marius Matei	12 March 1987 (aged 26)	2	0	(Romania) AutoBergamo Deva
15	FW	László Szőcs	10 October 1984 (aged 29)	2	2	(Romania) FC Odorheiu Secuiesc
19	FW	Szabolcs Mánya	30 January 1989 (aged 24)	0	0	(Romania) FC Odorheiu Secuiesc

=== Ukraine ===
Head coach: Yevgen Ryvkin

No.	Pos.	Player	Date of birth (age)	Caps	Goals	Club
1	GK	Yevgen Ivanyak	28 September 1982 (aged 31)	13	0	(Ukraine) MFK Lokomotiv Kharkiv
12	GK	Kyrylo Tsypun	30 July 1987 (aged 26)	4	0	(Ukraine) Uragan Ivano-Frankovsk
16	GK	Dmytro Lytvynenko	16 April 1987 (aged 26)	14	0	(Ukraine) MFK Lokomotiv Kharkiv
4	DF	Dmytro Bondar	12 October 1983 (aged 30)	2	0	(Ukraine) Energy Lviv
5	DF	Mykola Bilotserkivets	5 December 1986 (aged 27)	2	2	(Ukraine) MFK Lokomotiv Kharkiv
6	DF	Yevgen Valenko	1 November 1984 (aged 29)	4	1	(Ukraine) Uragan Ivano-Frankovsk
8	DF	Yevgen Rogachov	30 August 1983 (aged 30)	16	7	(Ukraine) Energy Lviv
10	DF	Dmytro Klochko	17 February 1987 (aged 26)	3	1	(Ukraine) MFK Lokomotiv Kharkiv
2	FW	Petro Shoturma	27 June 1992 (aged 21)	0	0	(Ukraine) Uragan Ivano-Frankovsk
3	FW	Vitaliy Kiselyov	20 February 1983 (aged 30)	3	0	(Ukraine) MFK Lokomotiv Kharkiv
7	FW	Maxym Pavlenko	15 September 1975 (aged 38)	9	6	(Ukraine) Energy Lviv
9	FW	Dmytro Sorokin	14 July 1988 (aged 25)	11	4	(Ukraine) MFK Lokomotiv Kharkiv
11	FW	Denys Ovsyannikov	10 December 1984 (aged 29)	14	9	(Ukraine) Energy Lviv
13	FW	Oleksandr Sorokin	13 August 1987 (aged 26)	5	0	(Ukraine) MFK Lokomotiv Kharkiv

== Group B ==
=== Netherlands ===
Head coach: Marcel Loosveld

No.	Pos.	Player	Date of birth (age)	Caps	Goals	Club
1	GK	Petrus Grimmelius	1 September 1987 (aged 26)	8	0	(Netherlands) CF Eindhoven
12	GK	Ennes van Maasbommel	28 October 1989 (aged 24)	2	0	(Netherlands) AORC Palestra
2	DF	Oualid Saadouni	12 March 1988 (aged 25)	5	0	(Netherlands) CF Eindhoven
5	DF	Mohammed Allouch	7 August 1989 (aged 24)	2	0	(Netherlands) FCK De Hommel
6	DF	Samir Makhoukhi	1 September 1982 (aged 31)	14	8	(Netherlands) FCK De Hommel
11	DF	Amir Molkarai	15 May 1987 (aged 26)	3	0	(Netherlands) Hovocubo
3	FW	Jamal El Ghannouti	29 March 1983 (aged 30)	11	5	(Netherlands) CF Eindhoven
4	FW	Nigel Wijdenbosch	3 April 1989 (aged 24)	0	0	(Netherlands) FC Marlène
7	FW	Yoshua St Juste	23 February 1991 (aged 22)	4	2	(Netherlands) Hovocubo
8	FW	Zaid El Morabiti	4 July 1984 (aged 29)	11	3	(Netherlands) AORC Palestra
9	FW	Najib El Allouchi	3 June 1988 (aged 25)	5	1	(Netherlands) FCK De Hommel
10	FW	Mohamed Attaibi	23 October 1987 (aged 26)	10	8	(Belgium) Futsal Topsport Antwerpen
13	FW	Mohamed Darri	11 September 1989 (aged 24)	5	1	(Netherlands) Hovocubo
14	FW	Karim Mossaoui	27 February 1988 (aged 25)	0	0	(Netherlands) TPP Rotterdam

=== Portugal ===
Head coach: Jorge Braz

No.	Pos.	Player	Date of birth (age)	Caps	Goals	Club
1	GK	João Benedito	7 October 1978 (aged 35)	32	0	(Portugal) Sporting CP
12	GK	André Sousa	25 February 1986 (aged 27)	6	0	(Portugal) AD Fundão
14	GK	Cristiano	20 August 1979 (aged 34)	5	0	(Portugal) Sporting CP
2	DF	Bruno Coelho	1 August 1987 (aged 26)	3	0	(Portugal) SL Benfica
4	DF	Pedro Costa	18 December 1978 (aged 35)	17	5	(Japan) Nagoya Oceans
7	DF	Fernando Cardinal	26 June 1985 (aged 28)	8	5	(Spain) Inter Movistar
8	DF	Pedro Cary	10 May 1984 (aged 29)	14	3	(Portugal) Sporting CP
9	DF	Gonçalo Alves	1 July 1977 (aged 36)	34	16	(Portugal) SL Benfica
11	DF	João Matos	21 February 1987 (aged 26)	13	3	(Portugal) Sporting CP
3	FW	Fernando Leitão	3 January 1981 (aged 33)	19	9	(Italy) Acqua & Sapone
5	FW	Joel Queirós	21 May 1982 (aged 31)	30	21	(Portugal) SL Benfica
6	FW	Arnaldo Pereira	16 June 1979 (aged 34)	29	14	(Latvia) FK Nikars Riga
10	FW	Ricardinho	3 September 1985 (aged 28)	14	11	(Spain) Inter Movistar
13	FW	Ricardo Fernandes	20 February 1986 (aged 27)	4	0	(Portugal) SL Benfica

=== Russia ===
Head coach: Sergei Skorovich

No.	Pos.	Player	Date of birth (age)	Caps	Goals	Club
1	GK	Ivan Poddubny	4 April 1986 (aged 27)	3	0	(Russia) MFK Dinamo Moskva
12	GK	Gustavo	5 February 1979 (aged 34)	8	0	(Russia) MFK Dinamo Moskva
5	DF	Sergei Sergeev	28 June 1983 (aged 30)	17	4	(Russia) MFK Dinamo Moskva
7	DF	Pula	2 December 1980 (aged 33)	17	12	(Russia) MFK Dinamo Moskva
14	DF	Ivan Milovanov	8 February 1989 (aged 24)	3	0	(Russia) MFK Tyumen
4	MF	Dmitri Lyskov	24 September 1987 (aged 26)	1	1	(Russia) Gazprom-Ugra Yugorsk
6	MF	Danil Kutuzov	13 March 1987 (aged 26)	1	0	(Russia) MFK Dina Moskva
2	FW	Vladislav Shayakhmetov	25 August 1981 (aged 32)	17	14	(Russia) MFK Viz-Sinara Yekaterinburg
3	FW	Nikolai Pereverzev	15 December 1986 (aged 27)	8	0	(Russia) MFK Tyumen
8	FW	Eder Lima	29 June 1984 (aged 29)	1	2	(Russia) Gazprom-Ugra Yugorsk
9	FW	Sergei Abramov	9 September 1990 (aged 23)	8	1	(Russia) MFK Viz-Sinara Yekaterinburg
10	FW	Robinho	28 January 1983 (aged 31)	3	2	(Russia) Gazprom-Ugra Yugorsk
11	FW	Cirilo	20 January 1980 (aged 34)	19	13	(Russia) MFK Dinamo Moskva
13	FW	Aleksandr Fukin	26 March 1985 (aged 28)	26	7	(Russia) MFK Dinamo Moskva

== Group C ==
=== Azerbaijan ===
Head coach: Alesio Da Silva

No.	Pos.	Player	Date of birth (age)	Caps	Goals	Club
1	GK	Laercio Buranello	12 April 1982 (aged 31)	3	0	(Azerbaijan) Araz Naxçivan
19	GK	Elnur Zamanov	17 May 1981 (aged 32)	6	0	(Azerbaijan) Araz Naxçivan
5	DF	Felipe	5 October 1978 (aged 35)	13	7	(Azerbaijan) Araz Naxçivan
6	DF	Edu	14 October 1986 (aged 27)	3	0	(Azerbaijan) Araz Naxçivan
8	DF	Rizvan Farzaliyev	1 September 1979 (aged 34)	18	4	(England) Baku United
13	DF	Elnur Gambarov	13 July 1978 (aged 35)	3	0	(Azerbaijan) Araz Naxçivan
15	DF	Rafael	26 December 1982 (aged 31)	0	0	(Azerbaijan) Araz Naxçivan
18	DF	Augusto	25 February 1980 (aged 33)	0	0	(Azerbaijan) Araz Naxçivan
2	FW	Seymur Mammadov	6 May 1983 (aged 30)	0	0	(Azerbaijan) Araz Naxçivan
7	FW	Rajab Farajzade	19 December 1980 (aged 33)	17	5	(England) Baku United
9	FW	Amadeu	6 March 1990 (aged 23)	0	0	(Azerbaijan) Araz Naxçivan
10	FW	Biro Jade	24 January 1973 (aged 41)	13	13	(Azerbaijan) Araz Naxçivan
14	FW	Vitaliy Borisov	5 July 1982 (aged 31)	14	9	(Azerbaijan) Araz Naxçivan
17	FW	Isa Atayev	7 August 1989 (aged 24)	0	0	(Azerbaijan) Araz Naxçivan

=== Italy ===
Head coach: Roberto Menichelli

No.	Pos.	Player	Date of birth (age)	Caps	Goals	Club
1	GK	Stefano Mammarella	2 February 1984 (aged 29)	17	1	(Italy) Acqua & Sapone
12	GK	Michele Miarelli	29 April 1984 (aged 29)	0	0	(Italy) Real Rieti
2	DF	Marco Ercolessi	15 May 1986 (aged 27)	12	2	(Italy) Luparense C5
3	DF	Gabriel Lima	19 August 1987 (aged 26)	12	7	(Italy) Asti
4	DF	Sergio Romano	28 September 1987 (aged 26)	14	11	(Italy) Pescara
5	DF	Luca Leggiero	11 November 1984 (aged 29)	3	2	(Italy) Pescara
13	DF	Daniel Giasson	24 August 1987 (aged 26)	3	0	(Italy) Pescara
17	DF	Murilo	10 March 1989 (aged 24)	0	0	(Italy) Acqua & Sapone
6	FW	Humberto Honorio	21 July 1983 (aged 30)	8	3	(Italy) Luparense C5
7	FW	Massimo De Luca	7 October 1987 (aged 26)	3	0	(Italy) Real Rieti
18	FW	Vampeta	18 July 1984 (aged 29)	5	0	(Italy) Asti
9	FW	Rodolfo Fortino	30 April 1983 (aged 30)	11	7	(Italy) Luparense C5
10	FW	Alex Merlim	15 July 1986 (aged 27)	3	1	(Italy) Luparense C5
11	FW	Saad Assis	26 October 1979 (aged 34)	22	14	(Spain) FC Barcelona

=== Slovenia ===
Head coach: Andrej Dobovičnik

No.	Pos.	Player	Date of birth (age)	Caps	Goals	Club
1	GK	Damir Puškar	3 September 1987 (aged 26)	7	0	(Slovenia) Litija
12	GK	Alen Mordej	13 March 1990 (aged 23)	4	0	(France) Toulon Tous Ensemble
6	DF	Uroš Kroflič	2 November 1985 (aged 28)	3	0	(Slovenia) Dobovec
7	DF	Igor Osredkar	28 June 1986 (aged 27)	9	3	(Croatia) MNK Novo Vrijeme Makarska
8	DF	Benjamin Melink	15 November 1982 (aged 31)	15	7	(Italy) C/5 Adriatica
13	DF	Gaj Rosič	14 May 1987 (aged 26)	3	0	(Portugal) Académica de Coimbra
14	DF	Tilen Štendler	8 October 1991 (aged 22)	3	0	(Slovenia) Puntar
2	FW	Rok Mordej	3 March 1989 (aged 24)	11	5	(Italy) New Team FVG
3	FW	Dejan Bizjak	21 April 1988 (aged 25)	3	0	(France) Toulon Tous Ensemble
4	FW	Sebastijan Drobne	19 April 1987 (aged 26)	8	4	(Cyprus) Melissa FC
5	FW	Kristjan Čujec	30 November 1988 (aged 25)	13	10	(Italy) New Team FVG
9	FW	Gašper Vrhovec	18 July 1988 (aged 25)	9	3	(Slovenia) Litija
10	FW	Alen Fetić	14 October 1991 (aged 22)	8	2	(Croatia) Novo Vrijeme Makarska
11	FW	Aleš Vrabel	10 September 1986 (aged 27)	0	0	(France) Toulon Tous Ensemble

== Group D ==
=== Croatia ===
Head coach: Mato Stanković

No.	Pos.	Player	Date of birth (age)	Caps	Goals	Club
1	GK	Ivo Jukić	13 April 1986 (aged 27)	14	0	(Latvia) FK Nikars Riga
12	GK	Marin Stojkić	30 September 1984 (aged 29)	10	0	(Croatia) MNK Murter
2	DF	Matija Capar	20 October 1984 (aged 29)	6	0	(Croatia) MNK Alumnus
3	DF	Jakov Grcić	12 April 1983 (aged 30)	13	5	(Croatia) MNK Novo Vrijeme Makarska
4	DF	Kristijan Grbeša	17 January 1990 (aged 24)	5	1	(Croatia) MNK Alumnus
9	DF	Alen Protega	5 March 1987 (aged 26)	5	0	(Croatia) MNK Split
10	DF	Tihomir Novak	24 October 1986 (aged 27)	13	5	(Italy) Asti
13	DF	Vedran Matošević	27 August 1990 (aged 23)	3	0	(Croatia) MNK Alumnus
14	DF	Gordan Duvančić	12 September 1987 (aged 26)	0	0	(Croatia) Skripta Osijek
5	FW	Nikola Pavić	10 August 1990 (aged 23)	3	0	(Croatia) FC Arena
6	FW	Saša Babić	4 August 1989 (aged 24)	10	1	(Croatia) MNK Novo Vrijeme Makarska
7	FW	Franko Jelovčić	6 July 1991 (aged 22)	10	4	(Croatia) MNK Split
8	FW	Dario Marinović	24 May 1990 (aged 23)	13	12	Al Yarmouk Kuwait
11	FW	Josip Šuton	14 November 1988 (aged 25)	5	0	(Croatia) MNK Split

=== Czech Republic ===
Head coach: Tomáš Neumann

No.	Pos.	Player	Date of birth (age)	Caps	Goals	Club
1	GK	Jakub Zdánský	28 May 1986 (aged 27)	2	0	(Czech Republic) Era-Pack Chrudim
12	GK	Libor Gerčák	22 July 1975 (aged 38)	14	1	(Czech Republic) 1.FC Nejzbach Vysoké Mýto
2	DF	David Cupák	27 May 1989 (aged 24)	0	0	(Czech Republic) Helas Brno
3	DF	Jiří Novotný	12 July 1988 (aged 25)	13	1	(Czech Republic) Bohemians Praha
4	DF	Petr Oliva	23 October 1987 (aged 26)	1	0	(Czech Republic) Slavia Praha
6	DF	Roman Mareš	15 March 1975 (aged 38)	26	22	(Czech Republic) Era-Pack Chrudim
9	DF	David Frič	17 February 1983 (aged 30)	11	3	(Slovakia) Slov-Matic Bratislava
5	FW	Michal Kovacz	17 April 1990 (aged 23)	0	0	(Czech Republic) FC Tango Brno
7	FW	Lukáš Rešetár	28 April 1984 (aged 29)	22	10	(Czech Republic) Era-Pack Chrudim
8	FW	Marcel Rodek	7 November 1988 (aged 25)	0	0	(Czech Republic) FC Benago Praha
10	FW	Michal Seidler	5 April 1990 (aged 23)	5	5	(Czech Republic) FC Tango Brno
13	FW	Zdeněk Sláma	28 December 1982 (aged 31)	22	3	(Slovakia) Slov-Matic Bratislava
14	FW	Matěj Slováček	8 October 1990 (aged 23)	3	1	(Czech Republic) Era-Pack Chrudim
18	FW	Michal Belej	16 November 1982 (aged 31)	13	6	(Czech Republic) FC Tango Brno

=== Spain ===
Head coach: José Venancio López Hierro

No.	Pos.	Player	Date of birth (age)	Caps	Goals	Club
1	GK	Rafa	13 June 1980 (aged 33)	10	0	(Spain) ElPozo Murcia
12	GK	Juanjo	19 August 1985 (aged 28)	21	0	(Spain) Santiago Futsal
13	GK	Jesús Herrero	4 November 1986 (aged 27)	0	0	(Spain) Inter Movistar
2	DF	Ortiz	3 October 1983 (aged 30)	24	11	(Spain) Inter Movistar
3	DF	José Ruiz	6 June 1983 (aged 30)	6	6	(Spain) ElPozo Murcia
4	DF	Torras	24 September 1980 (aged 33)	35	19	(Spain) FC Barcelona
5	DF	Aicardo	4 December 1988 (aged 25)	5	4	(Spain) FC Barcelona
6	FW	Fernandão	16 August 1980 (aged 33)	12	9	(Spain) FC Barcelona
7	FW	Pola	26 June 1988 (aged 25)	5	2	(Spain) Inter Movistar
8	FW	Miguelín	9 May 1985 (aged 28)	8	7	(Spain) ElPozo Murcia
9	FW	Sergio Lozano	9 November 1988 (aged 25)	8	8	(Spain) FC Barcelona
10	FW	Rafa Usín	22 May 1987 (aged 26)	11	5	(Spain) Magna Navarra
11	FW	Lin	16 May 1986 (aged 27)	18	7	(Spain) FC Barcelona
14	FW	Raúl Campos	17 December 1987 (aged 26)	3	4	(Spain) ElPozo Murcia
