= UEFA Futsal Euro 2012 =

2012 UEFA Futsal Euro 2012
UEFA Europsko futsal prvenstvo 2012

Tournament details
- Host country: Croatia
- Dates: 31 January – 11 February
- Teams: 12 (from 1 confederation)
- Venues: 2 (in 2 host cities)

Final positions
- Champions: Spain (6th title)
- Runners-up: Russia
- Third place: Italy
- Fourth place: Croatia

Tournament statistics
- Matches played: 20
- Goals scored: 109 (5.45 per match)
- Attendance: 95,519 (4,776 per match)
- Top scorer: (Spain) Jordi Torras (5 goals)
- Best player: (Spain) Kike

The UEFA Futsal Euro 2012 was the eighth official edition of the UEFA European Championship for national futsal teams. It was hosted by Croatia, and was played from January, 31 to February, 11. 12 teams competed for the title, with 11 teams gain entries from qualification rounds, while Croatia gained an automatic entry as hosts. The championship was played in the two biggest Croatian cities, Zagreb and the 15,024 seater Arena Zagreb and in Split, at the 10,931 capacity Spaladium Arena.

Spain defended their title, having won it for the sixth consecutive time.

== Bids ==
Three nations had made bids for the 2012 Championship. Alongside Croatia, Belgium – which had failed in the 2010 bid – made a new bid with Antwerp and Charleroi, while Macedonia made one with the city of Skopje. Croatia was selected to host the Championship by a decision made on 24 March 2010, at the UEFA Executive Committee meeting in Tel Aviv, Israel.

== Venues ==
Venues Map

Arena	Arena Zagreb	Spaladium Arena
Picture	Arena Zagreb	Spaladium Arena
City	Zagreb	Split
Capacity	15,024	10,931

== Qualification ==
Forty-two nations took part in 2012 edition. Host nation qualified directly, while other had to go through qualification rounds.

The qualification was played in two stages, with 24 sides competing in the preliminary round between 20 and 24 January 2011. The group winners progressed to join the other 18 entrants in the next phase. In the main qualifying round, which was taking place between 24 and 27 February 2011, 24 teams were split in 6 groups of 4 teams. The winners and best five second-placed teams joined Croatia in the finals.

=== Qualified teams ===
Country	Qualified as	Previous appearances in tournament^{1}
Croatia	Hosts	2 (1999, 2001)
Spain	Group 1 winner	7 (1996, 1999, 2001, 2003, 2005, 2007, 2010)
Azerbaijan	Group 1 runner-up	1 (2010)
Russia	Group 2 winner	7 (1996, 1999, 2001, 2003, 2005, 2007, 2010)
Serbia	Group 2 runner-up	3 (1999, 2007, 2010)
Portugal	Group 3 winner	5 (1999, 2003, 2005, 2007, 2010)
Czech Republic	Group 4 winner	5 (2001, 2003, 2005, 2007, 2010)
Romania	Group 4 runner-up	1 (2007)
Ukraine	Group 5 winner	6 (1996, 2001, 2003, 2005, 2007, 2010)
Turkey	Group 5 runner-up	0 (debut)
Italy	Group 6 winner	7 (1996, 1999, 2001, 2003, 2005, 2007, 2010)
Slovenia	Group 6 runner-up	2 (2003, 2010)

== Seeding ==
UEFA announced the seedings on Monday, 28 February 2011, one day after the qualification was concluded. Croatia was automatically seeded as A1. The Draw was scheduled for 9 September 2011 in the Croatian capital Zagreb.

Pot 1	Pot 2	Pot 3
Croatia (host, assigned to A1); Spain (title holder); Italy; Portugal	Russia; Czech Republic; Ukraine; Serbia	Azerbaijan; Romania; Slovenia; Turkey

== Referees ==
Country	Referees
Austria	Gerald Bauernfeind
Belgium	Pascal Lemal
Croatia	Danijel Janošević
Cyprus	Petros Panayides
Czech Republic	Karel Henych
England	Marc Birkett
Spain	Fernando Gutiérrez Lumbreras
Finland	Timo Onatsu

Country	Referees
Germany	Stephan Kammerer
Hungary	Gábor Kovács
Italy	Francesco Massini
Poland	Sebastian Stawicki
Portugal	Eduardo José Fernandes Coelho
Romania	Bogdan Sorescu
Russia	Ivan Shabanov
Slovenia	Borut Šivic

== Group stage ==
=== Group A ===
Team	Pld	W	D	L	GF	GA	GD	Pts
Croatia	2	2	0	0	7	5	+2	6
Romania	2	1	0	1	4	3	+1	3
Czech Republic	2	0	0	2	5	8	−3	0

31 January 2012
21:00

Croatia	2–1	Romania
Marinović 23'; Grcić 35'	Report	Csoma 30'

Spaladium Arena, Split
Attendance: 8,000
Referee: Pascal Lemal (Belgium)

2 February 2012
18:30

Romania	3–1	Czech Republic
Dobre 17'; Ignat 34'; Matei 37'	Report	Belej 8'

Spaladium Arena, Split
Attendance: 1,800
Referee: Timo Onatsu (Finland)

4 February 2012
20:30

Czech Republic	4–5	Croatia
Belej 24'; Kopecký 35'; Roman Mareš 37'; Novak 38' (o.g.)	Report	Grcić 9'; Marinović 23', 38'; Despotović 29'; Novak 37'

Spaladium Arena, Split
Attendance: 7,000
Referee: Eduardo Fernandes Coelho (Portugal)

=== Group B ===
Team	Pld	W	D	L	GF	GA	GD	Pts
Spain	2	2	0	0	8	3	+5	6
Ukraine	2	1	0	1	7	7	0	3
Slovenia	2	0	0	2	5	10	−5	0

31 January 2012
19:00

Spain	4–2	Slovenia
Miguelín 15'; Aicardo 26'; Torras 29', 30'	Report	Fetić 17'; Mordej 37'

Arena Zagreb, Zagreb
Attendance: 5,308
Referee: Bogdan Sorescu (Romania)

2 February 2012
20:30

Slovenia	3–6	Ukraine
Legchanov 27' (o.g.); Uršič 33'; Čujec 38'	Report	Klochko 5'; Legchanov 8', 21', 29'; Zhurba 9'; Pavlenko 16'

Arena Zagreb, Zagreb
Attendance: 2,252
Referee: Gerald Bauernfeind (Austria)

4 February 2012
14:00

Ukraine	1–4	Spain
Kike 32' (o.g.)	Report	Borja 4'; Miguelín 16'; Rafa Usín 18', 19'

Arena Zagreb, Zagreb
Attendance: 3,546
Referee: Petros Panayides (Cyprus)

=== Group C ===
Team	Pld	W	D	L	GF	GA	GD	Pts
Russia	2	1	1	0	7	2	+5	4
Italy	2	1	1	0	5	3	+2	4
Turkey	2	0	0	2	1	8	−7	0

1 February 2012
17:15

Italy	3–1	Turkey
Ippoliti 7', 30'; Gabriel Lima 37'	Report	Yasin Erdal 2'

Spaladium Arena, Split
Attendance: 1,200
Referee: Stephan Kammerer (Germany)

3 February 2012
18:30

Turkey	0–5	Russia
	Report	Maevski 1', 8', 24'; Fukin 21'; Cirilo 22'

Spaladium Arena, Split
Attendance: 600
Referee: Marc Birkett (England)

5 February 2012
20:30

Russia	2–2	Italy
Fukin 4'; Sergeev 17'	Report	Gabriel Lima 21'; Fortino 30'

Spaladium Arena, Split
Attendance: 1,000
Referee: Fernando Lumbreras (Spain)

=== Group D ===
Team	Pld	W	D	L	GF	GA	GD	Pts
Portugal	2	2	0	0	6	2	+4	6
Serbia	2	1	0	1	10	10	0	3
Azerbaijan	2	0	0	2	9	13	–4	0

1 February 2012
21:00

Portugal	4–1	Azerbaijan
Cardinal 3'; Felipe 4' (o.g.); Marinho 26'; Ricardinho 38'	Report	Farajzade 7'

Arena Zagreb, Zagreb
Attendance: 2,200
Referee: Ivan Shabanov (Russia)

3 February 2012
20:30

Azerbaijan	8–9	Serbia
Felipe 1', 9'; Farzaliyev 5'; Jadder Dantas 11', 23', 32'; Thiago 34'; Bojović 39' (o.g.)	Report	Bojović 6', 8', 29', 39'; Rajčević 9'; Kocić 22', 27'; Lazić 23'; Pavićević 37'

Arena Zagreb, Zagreb
Attendance: 2,300
Referee: Sebastian Stawicki (Poland)

5 February 2012
14:00

Serbia	1–2	Portugal
Ricardinho 31' (o.g.)	Report	Arnaldo 21'; Pedro Cary 36'

Arena Zagreb, Zagreb
Attendance: 2,282
Referee: Karel Henych (Czech Republic)

== Knockout stage ==
Quarter-finals
6 February 2012 – Split
Croatia	1 (3)
Ukraine	1 (1)
7 February 2012 – Split
Russia	2
Serbia	1
6 February 2012 – Zagreb
Romania	3
Spain	8
7 February 2012 – Zagreb
Italy	3
Portugal	1

Semi-finals
9 February 2012 – Zagreb
Croatia	2
Russia	4
9 February 2012 – Zagreb
Spain	1
Italy	0

Final
11 February 2012 – Zagreb
Russia	1
Spain	3
Third place
11 February 2012 – Zagreb
Croatia	1
Italy	3

=== Quarter-finals ===
6 February 2012
18:30

Romania	3–8	Spain
Gherman 8', 14'; Matei 25'	Report	Torras 3', 19', 29'; Aicardo 13', 27'; Rafa Usín 16'; Lin 30'; Ortiz 37'

Arena Zagreb, Zagreb
Attendance: 1,516
Referee: Gabor Kovacs (Hungary)

6 February 2012
21:00

Croatia	1–1 (a.e.t.)	Ukraine
Ovsyannikov 17' (o.g.)	Report	Chepornyuk 30'
Penalties
Grcić (penalty scored); Jelovčić (penalty scored); Novak (penalty scored)	3 – 1	(penalty missed) Kondratyuk; (penalty missed) Zhurba; (penalty scored) Pavlenko; (penalty missed) Legchanov

Spaladium Arena, Split
Attendance: 9,800
Referee: Francesco Massini (Italy)

7 February 2012
18:30

Russia	2–1	Serbia
Fukin 29'; Pula 34'	Report	Milosavac 25'

Spaladium Arena, Split
Attendance: 2,000
Referee: Danijel Janosevic (Croatia)

7 February 2012
21:00

Italy	3–1	Portugal
Arnaldo 20' (o.g.); Saad 29'; Patias 38'	Report	Ricardinho 24'

Arena Zagreb, Zagreb
Attendance: 2,215
Referee: Borut Sivic (Slovenia)

=== Semi-finals ===
9 February 2012
18:30

Croatia	2–4	Russia
Marinović 27', 37'	Report	Prudnikov 1'; Cirilo 5'; Abramov 16'; Pula 21'

Arena Zagreb, Zagreb
Attendance: 14,300
Referee: Borut Sivic (Slovenia)

9 February 2012
21:00

Spain	1–0	Italy
Aicardo 6'	Report

Arena Zagreb, Zagreb
Attendance: 8,300
Referee: Gabor Kovacs (Hungary)

=== Third place match ===
11 February 2012
18:30

Croatia	1–3	Italy
Grcić 31'	Report	Saad 1'; Honorio 26'; Mammarella 39'

Arena Zagreb, Zagreb
Attendance: 12,400
Referee: Fernando Lumbreras (Spain)

=== Final ===
11 February 2012
21:00

Russia	1–3 (a.e.t.)	Spain
Pula 34'	Report	Lozano 40', 48'; Borja 50'

Arena Zagreb, Zagreb
Attendance: 7,500
Referee: Danijel Janosevic (Croatia)

2012 UEFA Futsal Championship winners

Spain
Sixth title

== Tournament ranking ==
Per statistical convention in football, matches decided in extra time are counted as wins and losses, while matches decided by penalty shoot-out are counted as draws.

Pos	Team	Pld	W	D	L	GF	GA	GD	Pts	Final result
1	Spain	5	5	0	0	20	7	+13	15	Champions
2	Russia	5	3	1	1	14	8	+6	10	Runners-up
3	Italy	5	3	1	1	11	6	+5	10	Third place
4	Croatia	5	2	1	2	11	13	-2	7	Fourth place
5	Portugal	3	2	0	1	7	5	+2	6	Eliminated in Quarter-finals
6	Ukraine	3	1	1	1	8	8	0	4	Eliminated in Quarter-finals
7	Serbia	3	1	0	2	11	12	–1	3	Eliminated in Quarter-finals
8	Romania	3	1	0	2	7	11	–4	3	Eliminated in Quarter-finals
9	Czech Republic	2	0	0	2	5	8	–3	0	Eliminated in Group stage
10	Azerbaijan	2	0	0	2	9	13	–4	0	Eliminated in Group stage
11	Slovenia	2	0	0	2	5	10	–5	0	Eliminated in Group stage
12	Turkey	2	0	0	2	1	8	–7	0	Eliminated in Group stage
