= List of Azerbaijani futsal players =

This is a complete list of Azerbaijani futsallers.

== B ==
- Biro Jade
- Vitaliy Borisov

== F ==
- Rajab Farajzade
- Rizvan Farzaliyev

== H ==
- Ilkin Hajiyev

== M ==
- Namig Mammadkarimov

== P ==
- Thiago Gabriel Rodrigues Paz

== S ==
- Marat Salyanski
- Felipe Ribeiro dos Santos
- Serjão
- Edigleuson Alves de Sousa

== T ==
- Andrey Tveryankin
