= Ilkin =

Ilkin or İlkin is an Azerbaijani and Turkish given name and surname. Notable people with the name or surname include:

== People ==
=== Given name ===
- Ilkin Hajiyev (born 1983), Azerbaijani futsal player
- Ilkin Shahbazov (born 1986), Azerbaijani taekwondo player
- Ilkin Dovlatov (born 1990), Azerbaijani mugham singer
- Ilkin Qirtimov (born 1990), Azerbaijani footballer
- Ilkin Aydın (born 2000), Turkish volleyball player

=== Surname ===
- Baki İlkin, Turkish diplomat
- Tunch Ilkin, Turkish sports broadcaster
