= Tino Pérez =

Spanish football manager (born 1969)

Personal information
- Full name: Faustino Pérez-Moreno Gómez
- Date of birth: April 25, 1969 (age 57)
- Place of birth: Toledo, Spain

Managerial career
- Years: Team
- 1996–2000: Castilla-La Mancha FS
- 2000–2003: Playas de Castellón FS
- 2003–2005: Prone Lugo AD
- 2005–2007: FS Cartagena
- 2007–2008: Valencia FS
- 2008–2009: Design Construct Brasov
- 2010–2014: MFK Dinamo Moskva
- 2014–2016: Araz Naxçivan
- 2014–2016: Azerbaijan
- ‡ National team caps and goals as of 10 May 2016 Futsal team Acqua e Sapone Unigros

Faustino Pérez-Moreno Gómez (born 25 April 1969), commonly known as Tino Pérez, is a Spanish futsal coach.
