= Marat Salyanski =

Azerbaijani futsal player

Salyanski
Personal information
- Full name: Marat Salyanski
- Date of birth: 29 May 1974 (age 52)
- Place of birth: Azerbaijan
- Position: Goalkeeper

Team information
- Current team: Araz Naxçivan

International career
| Years | Team | Apps | (Gls) |
- Azerbaijan

Marat Salyanski (born 29 May 1974), is an Azerbaijani futsal player who plays for Araz Naxçivan and the Azerbaijan national futsal team.
