= 2010 UEFA Futsal Championship qualifying =

UEFA Futsal Euro 2010 qualifying
- Teams: (from 1 confederation)

== Preliminary round ==
=== Group A ===
Team	Pld	W	D	L	GF	GA	GD	Pts
Kazakhstan	3	3	0	0	13	2	+11	9
England	3	1	0	2	6	9	-3	3
Cyprus	3	1	0	2	4	7	-3	3
Republic of Ireland	3	1	0	2	2	7	-5	3

=== Group B ===
Team	Pld	W	D	L	GF	GA	GD	Pts
Latvia	3	3	0	0	15	2	+13	9
Bulgaria	3	1	1	1	8	5	+3	4
Armenia	3	1	1	1	10	14	-4	4
Estonia	3	0	0	3	5	17	-12	0

=== Group C ===
Team	Pld	W	D	L	GF	GA	GD	Pts
Greece	3	3	0	0	13	1	+12	9
Georgia	3	2	0	1	6	6	0	6
Albania	3	1	0	2	5	8	-3	3
Malta	3	0	0	3	4	13	-9	0

=== Group D ===
Team	Pld	W	D	L	GF	GA	GD	Pts
Finland	3	2	0	1	8	5	+3	6
Montenegro	3	2	0	1	9	7	+2	6
Israel	3	1	1	1	6	6	0	4
Turkey	3	0	1	2	2	7	-5	1

19 lutego 2009

Izrael Izrael 1:1 Turcja Turcja Neve Marom Hall, Ramat Gan Izrael

Finlandia Finlandia 4:2 Czarnogóra Czarnogóra Neve Marom Hall, Ramat Gan Izrael

20 lutego 2009

Izrael Izrael 2:3 Czarnogóra Czarnogóra Neve Marom Hall, Ramat Gan Izrael

Turcja Turcja 0:2 Finlandia Finlandia Neve Marom Hall, Ramat Gan Izrael

22 lutego 2009

Czarnogóra Czarnogóra 4:1 Turcja Turcja Neve Marom Hall, Ramat Gan Izrael

Finlandia Finlandia 2:3 Izrael Izrael Neve Marom Hall, Ramat Gan Izrael

== Qualifying round ==
=== Group 1 ===
Team	Pld	W	D	L	GF	GA	GD	Pts
Ukraine	3	2	1	0	10	5	+5	7
Romania	3	1	2	0	9	8	+1	5
Netherlands	3	1	0	2	11	9	+2	3
Andorra	3	0	1	2	6	14	-8	1

=== Group 2 ===
Team	Pld	W	D	L	GF	GA	GD	Pts
Spain ^{TH}	3	3	0	0	18	0	+18	9
Slovakia	3	2	0	1	11	9	+2	6
Kazakhstan	3	0	1	2	5	14	-9	1
Moldova	3	0	1	2	2	13	-11	1

^{TH} Title Holder

=== Group 3 ===
Team	Pld	W	D	L	GF	GA	GD	Pts
Czech Republic	3	2	1	0	9	6	+3	7
Croatia	3	2	0	1	7	5	+2	6
Latvia	3	1	0	2	2	4	-2	3
Bosnia and Herzegovina	3	0	1	3	6	9	-3	1

=== Group 4 ===
Team	Pld	W	D	L	GF	GA	GD	Pts
Italy	3	3	0	0	19	1	+18	9
Belarus	3	2	0	1	8	3	+5	6
Georgia	3	1	0	2	5	12	-8	3
Lithuania	3	0	0	3	0	16	-16	0

=== Group 5 ===
Team	Pld	W	D	L	GF	GA	GD	Pts
Belgium	3	3	0	0	14	4	+10	9
Serbia	3	2	0	1	11	8	+3	6
Greece	3	0	1	2	5	11	-6	1
North Macedonia	3	0	1	2	4	11	-7	1

=== Group 6 ===
Team	Pld	W	D	L	GF	GA	GD	Pts
Portugal	3	2	1	0	13	5	+8	7
Azerbaijan	3	2	1	0	12	7	+5	7
Finland	3	1	0	2	7	7	0	3
Poland	3	0	0	3	4	17	-13	0

=== Group 7 ===
Team	Pld	W	D	L	GF	GA	GD	Pts
Russia	3	3	0	0	11	1	+10	9
Slovenia	3	2	0	1	10	5	+5	6
Montenegro	3	1	0	2	8	18	-10	3
France	3	0	0	3	6	11	-5	0
