= Azerbaijan Futsal Premier League =

- Founded: 1994
- Country: Azerbaijan
- Confederation: UEFA
- Number of clubs: 6
- Level on pyramid: 1
- International cup: UEFA Futsal Champions League
- Current champions: Araz Naxçivan (17th title) (2022–23)
- Most championships: Araz Naxçivan (17 titles)
- Website: https://www.azfutzal.az/

Azerbaijan Futsal Premier League is the premier futsal league in Azerbaijan. It was founded in 1994. Organized by Association of Football Federations of Azerbaijan and is played under UEFA rules, currently consists of six teams.

== History ==
Araz Naxçivan is the most successful team in Azeri futsal, winning the Premier League 17 times. The 2019-20 season was abandoned due to the COVID-19 pandemic in Azerbaijan and Araz Naxçivan were declared champions being the top team of the league at the time of the abandonment. The 2020-21 season was cancelled for the same reason as last season and Araz Naxçivan were selected to play in the 2021–22 UEFA Futsal Champions League by the AFFA.

== 2023–24 season teams ==
- Araz Naxçivan
- Azerbaijan U-19
- Baku Fire
- Neftçi İK İB
- Record Club
- Yasamal Bakı

== Champions ==
Season	Winner
1994	Neftchi Baku PFC
1995	Azada
1996	Avtomobilçi
1997-98	Avtomobilçi
1998-99	Azerneftyanajag
1999-00	Azerneftyanajag
2000-01	Turan Air
2001-02	Turan Air
2002-03	Tribut
2003-04	Turan Air

Season	Winner
2004-05	Araz Naxçivan
2005-06	Araz Naxçivan
2006-07	Araz Naxçivan
2007-08	Araz Naxçivan
2008-09	Araz Naxçivan
2009-10	Araz Naxçivan
2010-11	Araz Naxçivan
2011-12	Araz Naxçivan
2012-13	Araz Naxçivan
2013-14	Araz Naxçivan

Season	Winner
2014-15	Khazar Islands
2015-16	Araz Naxçivan
2016-17	Araz Naxçivan
2017-18	Araz Naxçivan
2018-19	Araz Naxçivan
2019-20	Araz Naxçivan
2020-21	Cancelled due to COVID-19
2021-22	Araz Naxçivan
2022-23	Araz Naxçivan
2023-24	Araz Naxçivan

Season	Winner
2024-25	Araz Naxçivan

=== Results by team ===
Club	Titles	Years won
Araz Naxçivan	19	2005, 2006, 2007, 2008, 2009, 2010, 2011, 2012, 2013, 2014, 2016, 2017, 2018, 2019, 2020, 2022, 2023, 2024, 2025
Turan Air	3	2001, 2002, 2004
Azerneftyanajag	2	1999, 2000
Avtomobilçi	2	1996, 1998
Tribut	1	2003
Azada	1	1995
Neftchi	1	1994
Khazar Islands	1	2015
