= Namig Mammadkarimov =

Azerbaijani futsal player

Mammadkarimov
Personal information
- Full name: Namig Mammadkarimov
- Date of birth: 21 July 1980 (age 46)
- Place of birth: Azerbaijan
- Position: Cierre

Team information
- Current team: Araz Naxçivan

International career
Years	Team	Apps	(Gls)
- Azerbaijan

Namig Mammadkarimov (born 21 July 1980), is an Azerbaijani futsal player who plays for Araz Naxçivan and the Azerbaijan national futsal team.
