= Andrey Tveryankin =

Azerbaijani futsal player

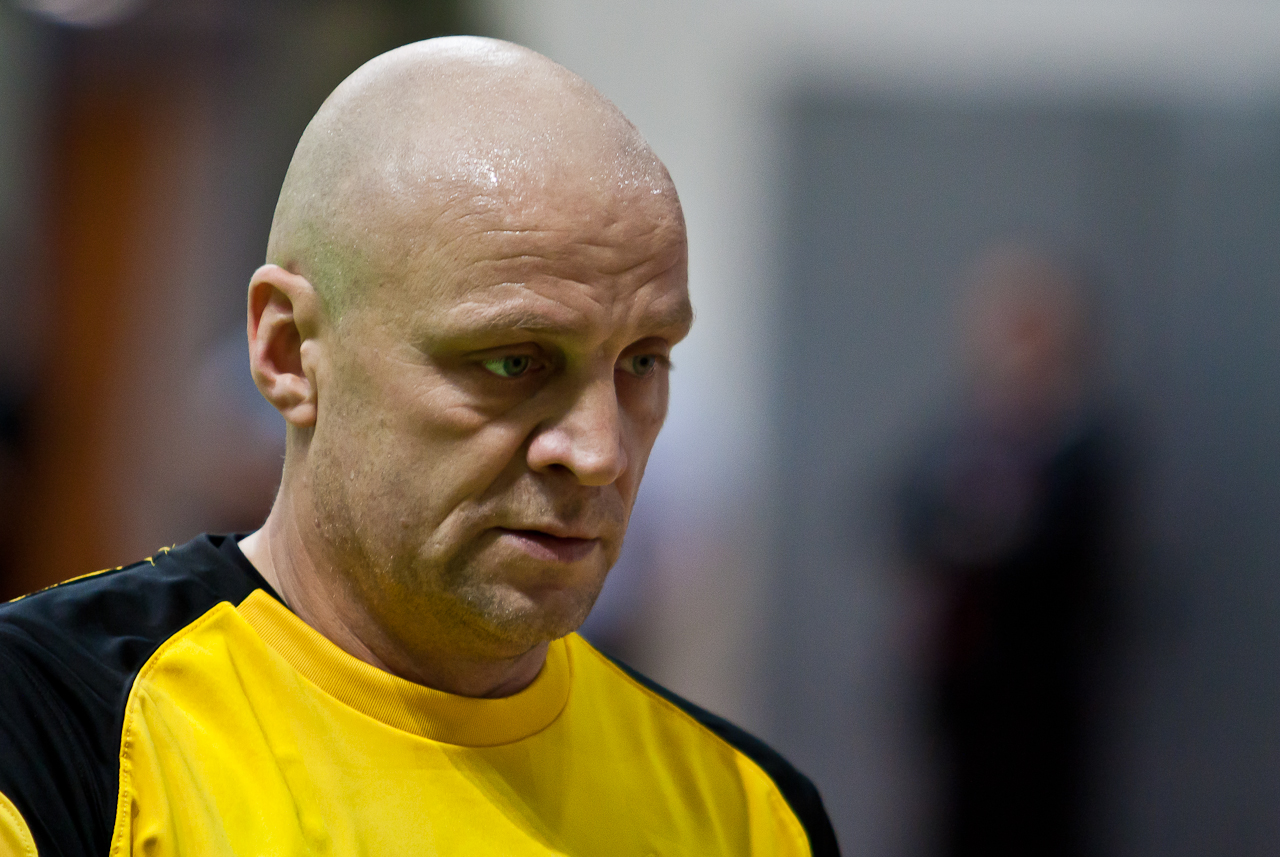

Personal information
- Full name: Andrey Tveryankin
- Date of birth: 6 March 1967 (age 59)
- Place of birth: Norilsk, Russian SFSR, Soviet Union
- Height: 1.82 m (6 ft 0 in)
- Position: Goalkeeper

Team information
- Current team: KPRF Moskva

Senior career*
Years	Team	Apps	(Gls)
- Araz Naxçivan
- KPRF Moskva

International career
- Azerbaijan
- * Club domestic league appearances and goals

Andrey Tveryankin (born 6 March 1967), is an Azerbaijani futsal player who plays for KPRF Moskva and the Azerbaijan national futsal team.
