= Edigleuson Alves =

Azerbaijani futsal player (born 1984)

Personal information
- Full name: Edigleuson Alves de Sousa
- Date of birth: 26 June 1984 (age 42)
- Place of birth: Brazil
- Position: Winger

Team information
- Current team: Araz Naxçivan

Senior career*
Years	Team	Apps	(Gls)
- Umuarama
- Guadalajara
- Luparense
- Araz Naxçivan

International career
- Azerbaijan
- * Club domestic league appearances and goals

Edigleuson Alves de Sousa (born 26 June 1984), known as just Alves, is a futsal player who plays as a winger for Araz Naxçivan. Born in Brazil, he plays for the Azerbaijan national team.
