= Abdelhak El Ghaadaoui =

Belgian futsal player (born 1992)

El Ghaadaoui
Personal information
- Full name: Abdelhak El Ghaadaoui
- Date of birth: 12 April 1992 (age 34)
- Place of birth: Belgium
- Position: Winger

Team information
- Current team: Antwerpen

International career
Years	Team	Apps	(Gls)
- Belgium

Abdelhak El Ghaadaoui (born 12 April 1992), is a Belgian futsal player who plays for Futsal Topsport Antwerpen and the Belgian national futsal team.
