= Josef Havel =

Czech futsal player

Havel
Personal information
- Full name: Josef Havel
- Date of birth: 12 February 1982 (age 44)
- Place of birth: Czechoslovakia
- Position: Winger

Team information
- Current team: Rádio Krokodýl Helas Brno

International career
Years	Team	Apps	(Gls)
- Czech Republic

Josef Havel (born 12 February 1982), is a Czech futsal player who plays for Rádio Krokodýl Helas Brno and the Czech Republic national futsal team.
