= Ilkin Hajiyev =

Azerbaijani futsal player

Hajiyev
Personal information
- Full name: Ilkin Hajiyev
- Date of birth: 8 January 1983 (age 43)
- Place of birth: Azerbaijan
- Position: Winger

Team information
- Current team: Neftchi Baku

International career
Years	Team	Apps	(Gls)
- Azerbaijan

Ilkin Hajiyev (born 8 January 1983), is an Azerbaijani futsal player who plays for Neftchi Baku and the Azerbaijan national futsal team.
