= David Morant =

Belgian futsal player

Morant
Personal information
- Full name: David Morant
- Date of birth: 24 December 1977 (age 48)
- Place of birth: Belgium
- Position: Goalkeeper

Team information
- Current team: Paris Métropole

International career
| Years | Team | Apps | (Gls) |
- Belgium

David Morant (born 24 December 1977), is a Belgian futsal player who plays for Paris Métropole and the Belgian national futsal team.
