= Cosmin Gherman =

Romanian futsal player

Personal information
- Full name: Cosmin Gherman
- Date of birth: 25 April 1984 (age 42)
- Place of birth: Bucharest, Romania
- Position: Pivot

Team information
- Current team: City'us Târgu Mureş

Senior career*
Years	Team	Apps	(Gls)
2002–2009	Deva		
2009–	City'us Târgu Mureş		
–	United Galati		
2013–	City'us Târgu Mureş		

International career
- Romania
- * Club domestic league appearances and goals

Cosmin Gherman (born 25 April 1984), is a Romanian futsal player who plays for City'us Târgu Mureş and the Romanian national futsal team.
