= Florin Ignat =

Romanian futsal player

Personal information
- Full name: Florin Ignat
- Date of birth: 26 February 1982 (age 44)
- Place of birth: Galati, Romania
- Position: Defender

Team information
- Current team: City'us

Senior career*
Years	Team	Apps	(Gls)
- Autobergamo Deva

International career
- Romania
- * Club domestic league appearances and goals

Florin Ignat (born 26 February 1982), is a Romanian futsal player who plays for City'us and the Romanian national futsal team.
