= Vladimir Milosavac =

Serbian futsal player

Milosavac
Personal information
- Full name: Vladimir Milosavac
- Date of birth: 1 December 1985 (age 40)
- Place of birth: SFR Yugoslavia
- Position: Winger

Team information
- Current team: SAS Marbo

International career
Years	Team	Apps	(Gls)
- Serbia

Vladimir Milosavac (born 1 December 1985), is a Serbian futsal player who plays for Marbo Intermezzo and the Serbia national futsal team.
