= Jakov Grcić =

Croatian futsal player who play

Grcić
Personal information
- Full name: Jakov Grcić
- Date of birth: 12 April 1983 (age 43)
- Place of birth: Croatia
- Position: Cierre

Team information
- Current team: HMNK Nova Gradiška

International career^{‡}
Years	Team	Apps	(Gls)
2007–2017	Croatia	91	(36)
- ‡ National team caps and goals as of 25 November 2019

Jakov Grcić (born 12 April 1983), is a Croatian futsal player who plays for HMNK Nova Gradiška and the Croatia national futsal team.
