= Kike (futsal player) =

Spanish futsal player

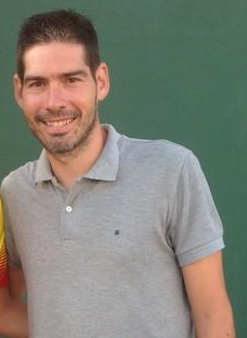

Personal information
- Full name: Enrique Boned Guillot
- Date of birth: 4 May 1978 (age 48)
- Place of birth: Valencia, Spain
- Height: 1.84 m (6 ft 0 in)
- Position: Defender

Senior career*
Years	Team	Apps	(Gls)
1998–2000	CLM Talavera	—	(13)
2000–2001	Valencia Vijusa	—	(40)
2001–2015	ElPozo Murcia	404	(272)

International career
	Spain	140	
Medal record
Representing Spain
Men's Futsal
FIFA Futsal World Cup
Winner	2000 Guatemala
Winner	2004 Chinese Taipei
Runner-up	2008 Brazil
Runner-up	2012 Thailand
- * Club domestic league appearances and goals

Enrique Boned Guillot (born 4 May 1978), commonly known as Kike, is a former Spanish futsal player who played as a Defender.

He was named the 2009 Futsal Player of the Year by Futsal Planet. He is one of only 2 players, along with Javi Rodriguez to have been part of 4 Futsal World Cup finalist teams (2000, 2004, 2008, 2012).

== Honours ==
- 2 World Cup (2000, 2004)
- 5 UEFA Futsal Championship (2001, 2005, 2007, 2010, 2012)
- 4 Spanish Leagues (05/06, 06/07, 08/09, 09/10)
- 3 Spanish Cups (2003, 2008, 2010)
- 3 Spanish Supercups (2006, 2010, 2012)

=== Individual ===
- 1 World Cup Silver Ball (2012)
- 2 LNFS MVP (01/02, 05/06)
- 4 LNFS best Defender (00/01, 01/02, 05/06, 08/09)
- 2009 Futsal Player of the Year
