= Javi Rodríguez (futsal player) =

Spanish futsal player

Personal information
- Full name: Javier Rodríguez Nebreda
- Date of birth: 26 March 1974 (age 52)
- Place of birth: Barcelona, Spain
- Height: 1.78 m (5 ft 10 in)
- Position: Winger

Senior career*
Years	Team	Apps	(Gls)
1991–1992	Sant Andreu		
1992–1997	Indústrias García		
1997–2006	Playas de Castellón		
2006–2012	Barcelona		
2012–2014	Kuwait Club		
2014–2015	Baku United		

International career
	Spain	168	(99)

Managerial career
- 2017–2018: Győri ETO
- 2024-: 1. Futsal Club Veszprém
Medal record
Representing Spain
Men's Futsal
FIFA Futsal World Cup
Runner-up	1996 Spain
Winner	2000 Guatemala
Winner	2004 Chinese Taipei
Runner-up	2008 Brazil
- * Club domestic league appearances and goals

Javier Rodríguez Nebreda (born 26 March 1974), commonly known as Javi Rodríguez, is a Spanish futsal player who plays for Baku United as a winger.

He was named the 2005 Futsal Player of the Year by Futsal Planet. He was a member of 4 Futsal World Cup finalist teams (1996, 2000, 2004 and 2008), an accolade only equalled by fellow Spaniard Kike. He is considered amongst the greatest futsal players ever

== Honours ==
- 3 Leagues (1999/00, 2000/01, 2010/11)
- 1 Supercopa de España (2004)
- 2 Copa del Rey (2011, 2012)
- 1 Spanish Cup (2011)
- 1 European Clubs Tournament (2001)
- 3 UEFA Futsal Cups (2002, 2003, 2012)
- 2 FIFA Futsal World Cup (2000, 2004)
- 1 runner FIFA Futsal World Cup (2008)
- 4 UEFA Futsal Championship (2001, 2005, 2007, 2010)
- 1 Silver Ball (World Cup China Taipei 2004)
- 1 LNFS MVP (2001)
