= Pavel Chistopolov =

Russian futsal player (born 1984)

Chistopolov
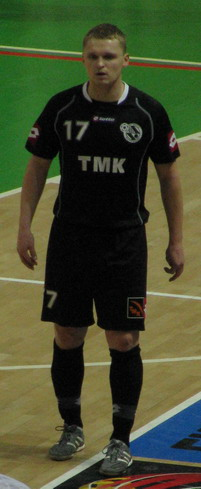

Personal information
- Full name: Pavel Chistopolov
- Date of birth: 15 March 1984 (age 42)
- Place of birth: Sverdlovsk Oblast, Soviet Union
- Height: 1.80 m (5 ft 11 in)
- Position: Pivot

Senior career*
Years	Team	Apps	(Gls)
2000–2012	Sinara Yekaterinburg		
2012–2015	Gazprom-Ugra		
2015	Dinamo Moskva		
2015–2018	Sinara Yekaterinburg		
2018–2019	Sibiryak		
2019	Dinamo-Samara		

International career
- Russia

Managerial career
- 2019–2023: Sinara Yekaterinburg (assistant)
- 2023-: Sinara Yekaterinburg
- 2023-: Russia (assistant)
- * Club domestic league appearances and goals

Pavel Anatolyevich Chistopolov (born 15 March 1984) is a Russian futsal manager and former player who currently manages Sinara Yekaterinburg and the Russian national futsal team as an assistant.
