= Clayton Baptistella =

Brazilian futsal player (born 1983)

Personal information
- Full name: Clayton Renato Baptistella
- Date of birth: 7 December 1983 (age 42)
- Place of birth: Brazil
- Height: 1.72 m (5 ft 8 in)
- Position: Pivot

Team information
- Current team: Marca Futsal

Senior career*
Years	Team	Apps	(Gls)
2005–2008	Napoli		
2008–2009	Arzignano		
2009–2010	Luparense		
2010–2011	Montesilvano		
2011–2012	Marca Futsal		

International career
	Italy	19	(13)
- * Club domestic league appearances and goals

Clayton Renato Baptistella (born 7 December 1983), is a Brazilian futsal player who plays for Montesilvano as a Pivot.

Clayton Baptistella is a member of the Italian national futsal team.

== Honours ==
- 1 Coppa Italia (2009)
