= Alesio =

Brazilian futsal player and coach

Personal information
- Full name: José Alesio da Silva
- Date of birth: September 27, 1968 (age 58)
- Place of birth: Brazil
- Position: Forward

Senior career*
Years	Team	Apps	(Gls)
- Voltorantin Pernambuco
- FC Barcelona
- Porto Alegre
- Vasco de Gama
- MFK Spartak Moskva
- TTG-Java Yugorsk

Managerial career
- MFK Spartak Moskva (player-coach)
- TTG-Java Yugorsk (player-coach)
- 2007–2008: Kairat Almaty
- 2008–2009: Araz Naxçivan
- 2009–2014: Azerbaijan
- * Club domestic league appearances and goals

José Alesio da Silva (born 27 September 1968), commonly known as Alesio, is a retired Brazilian futsal player and coach. He is the former coach of Azerbaijan national futsal team and Araz Naxçivan.

== Player ==
His playing career began in his native Brazil with Voltorantin Pernambuco, winning two state championships before a 1993 transfer to FC Barcelona Futsal. In his first season in Spain, he was voted the league's best player, but returned to Brazil in 1998 with Inter Ulbra Porto Alegre, helping his team win both the national and Rio de Janeiro state titles followed by the Interclubes international tournament.

In 2000, he joined CR Vasco de Gama and again immediately won Rio state and Brazilian titles before returning to Barcelona, then joining MFK Spartak Moskva, where he lifted the 2003/04 Russian Super Cup.

== Coach ==
Alesio was appointed player-coach at MFK Spartak Moskva and although he then went home to rejoin Ulbra, he was soon back in Russia in another player-coach role with TTG-Java Yugorsk.

In 2007, Alesio was appointed coach of Kairat Almaty, leading them to the Kazakhstan title and the UEFA Futsal Cup finals before moving on to lead Azerbaijan, and securing their first qualification for a major tournament. He also coaches the nation's leading club, Araz Naxçivan, who beat Kairat 4–3 in November to reach the 2009–10 UEFA Futsal Cup, to be held in April.
