= Vinícius Bácaro =

Italian–Brazilian futsal player

Vinicius Bacaro
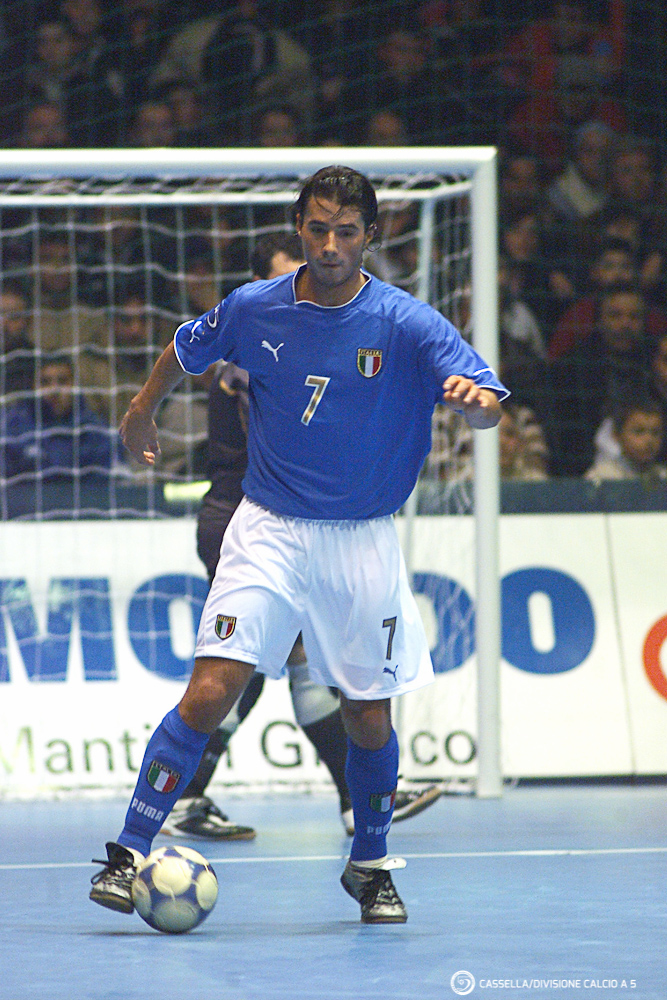
- Bacaro playing for the Italy national team in 2020

Personal information
- Full name: Vinicius Tunes Bacaro
- Date of birth: 20 August 1978 (age 48)
- Place of birth: São Paulo, Brazil
- Position: Ala

Team information
- Current team: Lazio

Senior career*
Years	Team	Apps	(Gls)
1995–2000	Saõ Caetano		
2000–2001	Corinthians		
2002	Banespa		
2002–2004	Lazio		
2004	Roma RCB		
2004–2005	Roma		
2005–2008	ElPozo Murcia	110	(78)
2008–2010	Inter Movistar	40	(5)
2010–2014	Lazio		
2014–	Latina		

International career
2003–2010	Italy	46	(24)
- * Club domestic league appearances and goals

Vinicius Bacaro (born 20 August 1978), is an Italian–Brazilian futsal player who plays for Latina as an Ala.

Vinicius Bácaro was a member of the Italian national futsal team.

== Honours ==
- 2 leagues (05/06, 06/07)
- 2 Copas de España (2008, 2009)
- 2 Supercopas de España (2006, 2009)
- 1 UEFA Futsal Cup (2009)
- 1 Cup of Brazil (2001)
- 2 Coppa Italia (2003, 2011)
- 1 Copa Ibérica (2007)
- 1 UEFA Futsal Championship (2003)
- 1 MVP UEFA Futsal Championship 2003
- 1 best Ala-Pívot of the LNFS (05/06)
