= Lúcio Carlos Lima Rosa =

Brazilian-born Belgian futsal player

Lúcio
Personal information
- Full name: Lúcio Carlos Lima Rosa
- Date of birth: 4 July 1975 (age 51)
- Place of birth: São Luís, Maranhão, Brazil
- Position: Defender

Team information
- Current team: Châtelineau

Senior career*
Years	Team	Apps	(Gls)
1996–1997	Maranhão		
1997–1998	Girassol		
1998–1999	Cruzeiro		
1999–2000	Maranhão		
2000–2001	Osasco		
2001–2013	Action 21		
2013–	Châtelineau		

International career
- Belgium
- * Club domestic league appearances and goals

Lúcio Carlos Lima Rosa, a.k.a. Lúcio (born 4 July 1975), is a Brazilian born, Belgian futsal player who plays for Châtelineau and the Belgian national futsal team.
