= Serjão (futsal player) =

Brazilian-born Azerbaijani futsal player

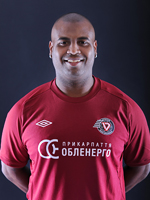

Personal information
- Full name: Sergio Luis Maciel Lucas
- Date of birth: 18 September 1979 (age 47)
- Place of birth: Brazil
- Height: 1.84 m (6 ft 1/2 in)
- Position: Pivot

Team information
- Current team: Inter FS
- Number: 5

Senior career*
Years	Team	Apps	(Gls)
	Internacional	81	(69)
- GMC Chevrolet
- Banespa
- Ulbra
2004–2005	TTG-Java		
2005–2007	Spartak Moskva		
2007–2008	FC Barcelona Futsal		
2008–2010	Araz Naxçivan		
2010–	Inter FS		

International career
	Azerbaijan	43	(12)
- * Club domestic league appearances and goals

Sergio Luis Maciel Lucas, aka Serjão (born 18 September 1979), is a Brazilian born, Azerbaijani futsal player who plays for Uragan Ivano-Frankovsk and the Azerbaijan national futsal team.
