= Libor Gerčák =

Czech futsal player

Gerčák
Personal information
- Full name: Libor Gerčák
- Date of birth: 22 July 1975 (age 51)
- Place of birth: Czechoslovakia
- Position: Goalkeeper

Team information
- Current team: 1.FC Nejzbach Vysoké Mýto

International career
Years	Team	Apps	(Gls)
- Czech Republic

Libor Gerčák (born 22 July 1975), is a Czech futsal player who plays for 1.FC Nejzbach Vysoké Mýto and the Czech Republic national futsal team.
