= Zdeněk Sláma =

Czech futsal player

Sláma
Personal information
- Full name: Zdeněk Sláma
- Date of birth: 28 December 1982 (age 43)
- Place of birth: Czechoslovakia
- Position: Pivot

Team information
- Current team: Slov-Matic Bratislava

International career
Years	Team	Apps	(Gls)
- Czech Republic

Zdeněk Sláma (born 28 December 1982), is a Czech futsal player who plays for Balticflora Teplice and the Czech Republic national futsal team.
