= Valeriy Legchanov =

Ukrainian futsal player

Legchanov
Personal information
- Full name: Valeriy Legchanov
- Date of birth: 13 February 1980 (age 46)
- Place of birth: Soviet Union
- Position: Defender

Team information
- Current team: Energy Lviv

Senior career*
Years	Team	Apps	(Gls)
- Energy Lviv

International career
- Ukraine
- * Club domestic league appearances and goals

Valeriy Legchanov (born 13 February 1980), is a Ukrainian futsal player who plays for Energy Lviv and the Ukraine national futsal team.
