= Vidan Bojović =

Serbian futsal player

Bojović
Personal information
- Full name: Vidan Bojović
- Date of birth: 27 June 1979 (age 47)
- Place of birth: SFR Yugoslavia
- Position: Winger

Team information
- Current team: Ekonomac Kragujevac

International career
Years	Team	Apps	(Gls)
- Serbia

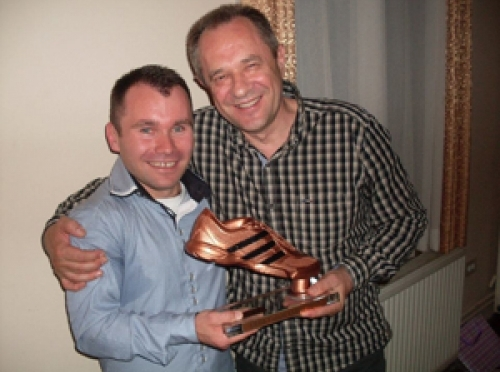
Bojovic holding award (2012)

Vidan Bojović (born 27 June 1979), is a Serbian futsal player who plays for Ekonomac Kragujevac and the Serbia national futsal team.
