= Biro Jade =

Azerbaijani futsal player

Personal information
- Full name: Nilson Machado dos Santos
- Date of birth: 24 January 1973 (age 53)
- Place of birth: Brazil
- Positions: Defender; forward

Team information
- Current team: Araz Naxçivan

Senior career*
Years	Team	Apps	(Gls)
2006–2013	Araz Naxçivan	565	(323)

International career
2005–2013	Azerbaijan	345	(99)

Managerial career
- 2013–: Azerbaijan (assistant manager)
- * Club domestic league appearances and goals

Nilson Machado dos Santos (born 24 January 1973), commonly known as Biro Jade, is a Brazil born, Azerbaijani futsal player who played for Araz Naxçivan. He won Golden Boot award as join top scorer with five goals in UEFA European Futsal Championship 2010. He is now an assistant manager in Azerbaijan national futsal team.

== Honours ==
- European Futsal Golden Boot winner: (2010)
