= David Frič =

Czech futsal player

Frič
Personal information
- Full name: David Frič
- Date of birth: 17 February 1983 (age 43)
- Place of birth: Kladno, Czechoslovakia
- Position: Winger

Team information
- Current team: Slov-Matic Bratislava

International career
Years	Team	Apps	(Gls)
- Czech Republic

David Frič (born 17 February 1983), is a Czech futsal player who plays for Slov-Matic Bratislava and the Czech Republic national futsal team.
