= Lukáš Rešetár =

Czech futsal player

Rešetár
Personal information
- Full name: Lukáš Rešetár
- Date of birth: 28 April 1984 (age 42)
- Place of birth: Aš, Czechoslovakia
- Position: Winger

Team information
- Current team: Era-Pack Chrudim

International career
Years	Team	Apps	(Gls)
- Czech Republic

Lukáš Rešetár (born 28 April 1984), is a Czech futsal player who plays for Era-Pack Chrudim and the Czech Republic national futsal team.
