= Vladimir Lazić =

Serbian futsal player (born 1988)

Lazić
Personal information
- Full name: Vladimir Lazić
- Date of birth: 11 September 1988 (age 38)
- Place of birth: SFR Yugoslavia
- Position: Defender

Team information
- Current team: Bezanija Beograd Ofk Beograd

International career
| Years | Team | Apps | (Gls) |
- Serbia

Vladimir Lazić (born 11 September 1988), is a Serbian futsal player who plays for Novi Beograd and the Serbia national futsal team.
