= Luca Ippoliti =

Italian futsal player

Personal information
- Full name: Luca Ippoliti
- Date of birth: 31 October 1979 (age 47)
- Place of birth: Marino, Lazio, Italy
- Position: Ala

Team information
- Current team: Lazio

Senior career*
Years	Team	Apps	(Gls)
1999–01	Genzano		
2001–03	Lazio		
2003–07	Nepi		
2007–08	Lazio		
2008–09	Torrino		
2009–	Lazio		

International career
- Italy
- * Club domestic league appearances and goals

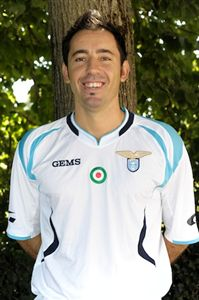

Luca Ippoliti (born 31 October 1979), is an Italian futsal player who plays for Lazio as an Ala.

== Honours ==
- Serie A: (1) 1999
- Coppa Italia: (2) 2003, 2011
- UEFA Futsal Championship: (1) 2003
