= Marek Kopecký =

Czech futsal player

Personal information
- Date of birth: 19 February 1977 (age 49)
- Place of birth: Czechoslovakia
- Position: Midfielder

Team information
- Current team: Bohemians (futsal)

Senior career*
Years	Team	Apps	(Gls)
1997–2001	České Budějovice	39	(0)

International career
- Czech Republic futsal
- * Club domestic league appearances and goals

Marek Kopecký (born 19 February 1977), is a Czech futsal player who plays for Bohemians and the Czech Republic national futsal team. He played as a midfielder for České Budějovice in the Czech First League for three seasons between 1997 and 2001.
