= Bojan Pavićević =

Serbian futsal player

Pavićević
Personal information
- Full name: Bojan Pavićević
- Date of birth: 20 October 1975 (age 51)
- Place of birth: SFR Yugoslavia
- Position: Winger

Senior career*
Years	Team	Apps	(Gls)
- Marbo Intermezzo

International career
- Serbia
- * Club domestic league appearances and goals

Bojan Pavićević (born 20 October 1975), is former Serbian futsal player who played as winger for Marbo Intermezzo and the Serbia national futsal team. He is currently director of Serbia futsal teams.
