= Oleksandr Kondratyuk =

Ukrainian futsal player

Personal information
- Full name: Oleksandr Oleksandrovych Kondratyuk
- Date of birth: 9 April 1983 (age 43)
- Place of birth: Ukrainian SSR, Soviet Union
- Position: Winger

Team information
- Current team: Lokomotiv Kharkiv

International career
Years	Team	Apps	(Gls)
- Ukraine

Oleksandr Oleksandrovych Kondratyuk (Ukrainian: Олександр Олександрович Кондратюк; born 9 April 1983) is a Ukrainian futsal player who plays for Lokomotiv Kharkiv and the Ukraine national futsal team.
