= Felipe (futsal player) =

Brazilian futsal player

Personal information
- Full name: Felipe Ribeiro dos Santos
- Date of birth: 5 October 1978 (age 48)
- Place of birth: Brazil
- Position: Cierre

Team information
- Current team: Araz Naxçivan

International career
Years	Team	Apps	(Gls)
- Azerbaijan

Felipe Ribeiro dos Santos, commonly known as Felipe (born 5 October 1978), is a professional futsal player who plays for Araz Naxçivan and the Azerbaijan national futsal team.
