= Rajab Farajzade =

Azerbaijani futsal player

Personal information
- Full name: Rajab Farajzade
- Date of birth: 19 December 1980 (age 45)
- Place of birth: Azerbaijan
- Position: Ala

Team information
- Current team: Araz Naxçivan

International career
| Years | Team | Apps | (Gls) |
- Azerbaijan

Rajab Farajzade (born 19 December 1980), is an Azerbaijani futsal player who plays for Araz Naxçivan and the Azerbaijan national futsal team.
