= Thiago (futsal) =

Brazilian-born Azerbaijani futsal player

Personal information
- Full name: Thiago Gabriel Rodrigues Paz
- Date of birth: 26 August 1981 (age 45)
- Place of birth: Brazil
- Positions: Ala; Pivot

Team information
- Current team: Araz Naxçivan

International career
Years	Team	Apps	(Gls)
- Azerbaijan

Thiago Gabriel Rodrigues Paz, commonly known as Thiago (born 26 August 1981), is a Brazilian born, Azerbaijani futsal player who plays for Araz Naxçivan and the Azerbaijan national futsal team.
