= Aleksandr Fukin =

Russian futsal player

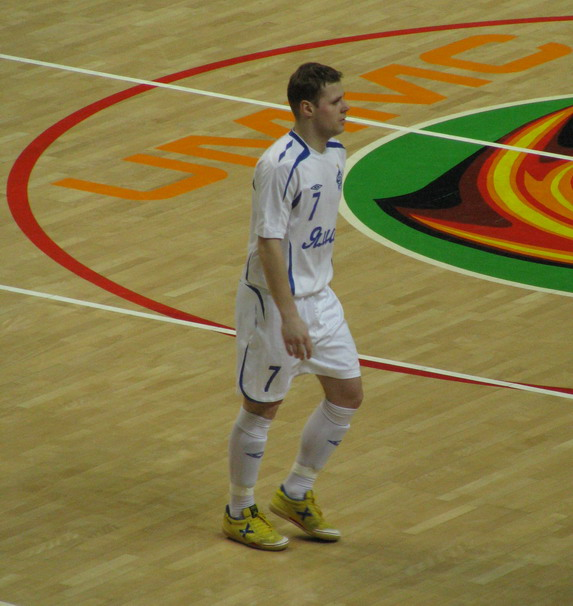

Personal information
- Full name: Aleksandr Fukin
- Date of birth: 26 March 1985 (age 41)
- Place of birth: Moscow, Soviet Union
- Height: 1.73 m (5 ft 8 in)
- Position: Winger

Team information
- Current team: KPRF
- Number: 11

Senior career*
Years	Team	Apps	(Gls)
2001–2009	Dina		
2009–2017	Dinamo Moskva		
2017–2019	Norilsk Nickel		
2019–	KPRF		

International career
- Russia
- * Club domestic league appearances and goals

Aleksandr Fukin (born 26 March 1985) is a Russian futsal player who plays for KPRF and the Russian national futsal team.

== Biography ==
Fukin is a graduate of Dina Moscow. He made his debut for first team in 2001/02, when he scored his first goal and became one of the youngest player scored goal in the history of Russian futsal. In 2003/04 he helped Dina to win silver medals and was honored he best young player of Russian championship.

Fukin was a member of Russian national team on European Futsal Championships in 2005 and 2007, where Russian side won silver and bronze medals. In 2007, he scored goal in the match for the third place against Portugal.

In 2005/06 and 2006/07 he was among top-10 goalscorers of Russian championship but silver medals-2003/04 was the only success with Dina – club’s result were quite poor that time.

In 2008/09 he moved to Dinamo Moscow. That year he won his first trophy – Russian Cup, scored goal in final against VIZ-Sinara (Ekaterinburg). With Dinamo he won three titles of Russian champion – (2010/11, 2011/12, 2012/13).

== Achievements ==
=== Club ===
Russian champion (3): 2010/11, 2011/12, 2012/13

Russian Cup winner (4): 2009, 2010, 2011, 2013

UEFA Futsal Cup runner-up: 2011/12, 2012/13

== International ==
European Futsal Championship silver medalist: 2005, 2012, 2014

European Futsal Championship bronze medalist: 2007

Futsal World Championship semi-final: 2008
