= Spain national futsal team =

National sports team

Spain
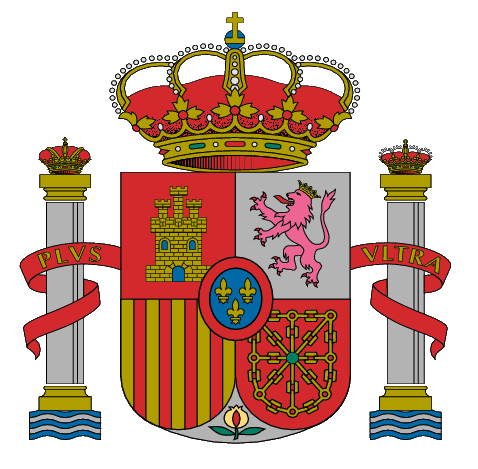
- Shirt badge/Association crest
- Association: Royal Spanish Football Federation
- Confederation: UEFA (Europe)
- Head coach: (Spain) Jesus Velasco
- Most caps: Carlos Ortiz (215)
- Top scorer: Javi Rodríguez (99)
- FIFA code: ESP
- FIFA ranking: 3 (24 September 2026)
- Highest FIFA ranking: 2 (May 2024; April 2025)
- Lowest FIFA ranking: 3 (October 2024)
Home colours	Away colours

First international
- Italy 2–4 Spain (Leiden, Netherlands; 2 April 1982)

Biggest win
- Spain 19–2 New Zealand (Melbourne, Australia; 21 October 1988)

Biggest defeat
- Brazil 9–3 Spain (Arapoti, Brazil; 2 October 1991)

FIFA World Cup
- Appearances: 10 (First in 1989)
- Best result: Champions (2000, 2004)

AMF World Cup
- Appearances: 7
- Best result: Runners-up (1985)

European Championship
- Appearances: 12 (First in 1996)
- Best result: Champions (1996, 2001, 2005, 2007, 2010, 2012, 2016, 2026)

Grand Prix de Futsal
- Appearances: 1 (First in 2010)
- Best result: Champions (2010)

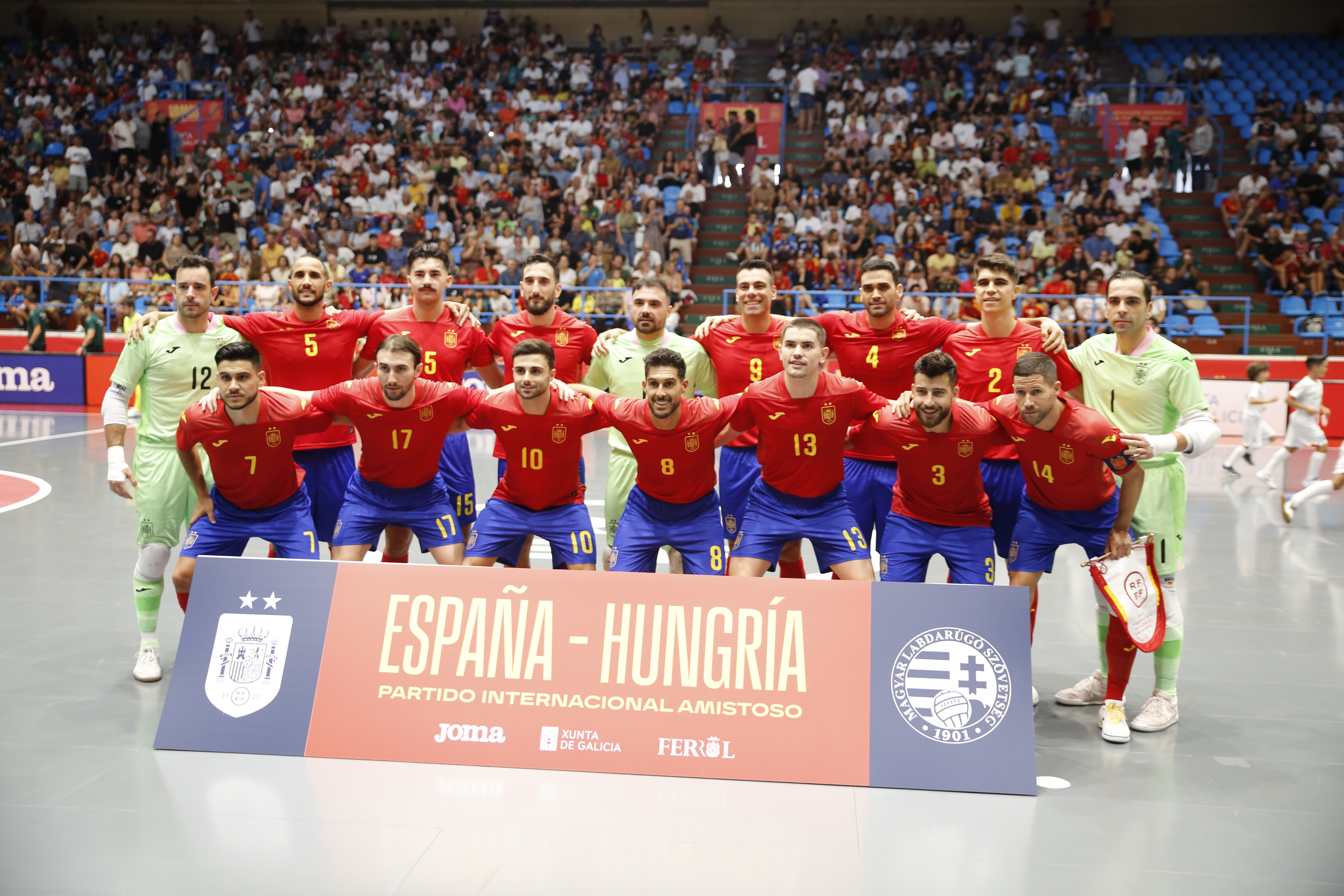
Spain national futsal team in 2024.

The Spain national futsal team represents Spain in international futsal competitions and is controlled by the Royal Spanish Football Federation. It is one of the strongest teams in the world, eight times champions in the UEFA Futsal Championship, and the two times consecutive champions of the FIFA Futsal World Cup.

It has been proclaimed world champion in 2000 and 2004, and three times runner-up in 1996, 2008 and 2012.

At the continental level of UEFA competitions, it has participated in the eleven disputed editions of the UEFA Futsal Championship, of which was organizer in the first two, of 1996 and 1999. It has been continental champion eight times, in 1996, 2001, 2005, 2007, 2010, 2012, 2016 and 2026, being runner-up in 1999 and 2018, not reaching the final only in the editions of 2003, 2014 and 2022, where it was eliminated in the semifinals.

These titles make Spain the second most successful national team after Brazil.

== Results and fixtures ==
The following is a list of match results in the last 12 months, as well as any future matches that have been scheduled.

Legend

Win Draw Lose Fixture

=== 2024 ===
12 April 2024 Friendly	Spain	5–0	Paraguay	Manzanares, Spain
20:00				Stadium: Manzanares Arena

14 April 2024 Friendly	Spain	2–1	Paraguay	Valdepeñas, Spain
12:30				Stadium: Pabellón Virgen de la Cabeza

15 September 2024 FIFA Futsal World Cup GS Group D	Spain	1–1	Kazakhstan	Andijan, Uzbekistan
	Gordillo 16'23"	Report	Orazov 00'05"	Stadium: Andijan Universal Sports Complex; Attendance: 1,808; Referee: Roberto López (Panama)

18 September 2024 FIFA Futsal World Cup GS Group D	Spain	7–1	New Zealand	Andijan, Uzbekistan
				Stadium: Andijan Universal Sports Complex; Referee: Mohamed Youssef (Egypt)

21 September 2024 FIFA Futsal World Cup GS Group D	Libya	0–8	Spain	Andijan, Uzbekistan
				Stadium: Andijan Universal Sports Complex

25 September 2024 FIFA Futsal World Cup Round of 16	Spain	1–2	Venezuela	Andijan, Uzbekistan
				Stadium: Andijan Universal Sports Complex

== Coaching staff ==
=== Current coaching staff ===
- Head coach – Fede Vidal

== Players ==
=== Current squad ===
The following players were called up to the squad for the UEFA 2024 FIFA Futsal World Cup qualification matches against Czech Republic and Italy on 15 and 20 September 2023, respectively.
Head coach: Fede Vidal

No.	Pos.	Player	Date of birth (age)	Caps	Club
1	GK	Jesús Herrero	4 November 1986 (age 40)		(Spain) Inter Movistar
12	GK	Dídac Plana	22 May 1990 (age 36)		(Spain) FC Barcelona
2	DF	Antonio Pérez	19 October 2000 (age 26)		(Spain) FC Barcelona
4	DF	Francisco Tomaz	13 September 1990 (age 36)		(Spain) Jimbee Cartagena
5	DF	Boyis	26 December 1989 (age 36)		(Spain) Viña Albali Valdepeñas
13	DF	Miguel Mellado	23 July 1999 (age 27)		(Spain) Jimbee Cartagena
3	FW	Juanjo Catela	14 April 1995 (age 31)		(Spain) FC Barcelona
6	FW	Raúl Gómez	25 October 1995 (age 31)		(Spain) Inter Movistar
7	FW	Pablo Ramírez	25 February 2001 (age 25)		(Spain) Jimbee Cartagena
8	FW	Adolfo Fernández	19 May 1993 (age 33)		(Spain) FC Barcelona
9	FW	Eric Pérez	10 February 1997 (age 29)		(Spain) ElPozo Murcia
10	FW	Javier Mínguez	17 July 1996 (age 30)		(Spain) Jimbee Cartagena
11	FW	Chino	13 November 1991 (age 34)		(Spain) Jaén FS
14	FW	Raúl Campos (captain)	17 December 1987 (age 38)		(Spain) Manzanares FS

=== Recent call-ups ===
The following players have also been called up to the squad within the last 12 months.

Pos.	Player	Date of birth (age)	Caps	Goals	Club	Latest call-up
GK	Chemi	19 February 1996 (age 30)			(Spain) Jimbee Cartagena	v. Cyprus, 8 November 2022
DF	Sergio González	30 June 1997 (age 29)			(Spain) FC Barcelona	v. Moldova, 8 March 2023
DF	Raya	8 May 1997 (age 29)			(Spain) Inter Movistar	v. Cyprus, 8 November 2022
FW	Raúl Jiménez	3 October 1998 (age 28)			(Spain) Real Betis	v. Moldova, 8 March 2023
FW	Pol Pacheco	11 July 1994 (age 32)			(Spain) Viña Albali Valdepeñas	v. Cyprus, 8 November 2022
FW	Cecilio Morales	6 July 1992 (age 34)			(Spain) Inter Movistar	v. Cyprus, 8 November 2022
FW	Francisco Solano	26 August 1991 (age 35)			(Spain) Viña Albali Valdepeñas	v. Cyprus, 8 November 2022
FW	Jesús Gordillo^{INJ}	8 February 2001 (age 25)			(Spain) Palma Futsal	v. Finland, 7 October 2022
^{COV} Player withdrew from the squad due to contracting COVID-19.^{INJ} Player withdrew from the squad due to an injury.^{PRE} Preliminary squad.^{RET} Retired from international futsal.

== Competitive record ==
=== FIFA Futsal World Cup ===
FIFA Futsal World Cup record										Qualification record						
Year	Round	Position	Pld	W	D	L	GF	GA	Squad	Outcome	Pld	W	D	L	GF	GA
(Netherlands) 1989	Group Stage	9th	3	2	0	1	14	9	Squad	Qualified as invitees						
(Hong Kong) 1992	Third Place	3rd	8	5	1	2	42	35	Squad	Group B Winners	4	4	0	0	21	6
(Spain) 1996	Runners-up	2nd	8	7	0	1	34	12	Squad	Qualified as hosts						
(Guatemala) 2000	Champions	1st	8	8	0	0	41	8	Squad	Group B Winners	5	5	0	0	39	4
(Taiwan) 2004	Champions	1st	8	6	1	1	30	7	Squad	Play-offs	4	4	0	0	16	5
(Brazil) 2008	Runners-up	2nd	9	7	2	0	29	11	Squad	Play-offs	4	4	0	0	29	3
(Thailand) 2012	Runners-up	2nd	7	5	1	1	31	13	Squad	Play-offs	5	5	0	0	32	0
(Colombia) 2016	Quarter-finals	5th	5	4	0	1	20	14	Squad	Play-offs	5	4	0	1	27	4
(Lithuania) 2021	Quarter-finals	6th	5	4	0	1	19	9	Squad	Group B Winners	6	6	0	0	22	7
(Uzbekistan) 2024	Round of 16	11th	4	2	1	1	17	4	Squad	Group D Winners	10	9	1	0	55	4
Total	2 Titles	10/10	65	50	6	9	277	122	—	8/8	43	41	1	1	241	33

=== UEFA Futsal Championship ===
UEFA Futsal Championship record
Year	rank	M	W	D	L	GF	GA	GD
(Spain) 1996	Champions	4	3	1	0	13	7	+6
(Spain) 1999	Runners-up	5	4	1	0	17	7	+10
(Russia) 2001	Champions	5	5	0	0	19	5	+14
(Italy) 2003	Fourth Place	4	1	2	1	8	6	+2
(Czech Republic) 2005	Champions	5	4	0	1	15	7	+8
(Portugal) 2007	Champions	5	3	2	0	16	7	+9
(Hungary) 2010	Champions	5	4	1	0	27	5	+22
(Croatia) 2012	Champions	5	5	0	0	20	7	+13
(Belgium) 2014	Third Place	5	3	1	1	26	12	+14
(Serbia) 2016	Champions	5	5	0	0	27	11	+16
(Slovenia) 2018	Runners-up	5	2	2	1	13	12	+1
(Netherlands) 2022	Third Place	6	4	1	1	26	8	+18
(Latvia) (Lithuania) (Slovenia) 2026	Champions	6	6	0	0	27	8	+19
Total:13/13	8 Titles	65	49	11	5	254	102	+152

=== Grand Prix de Futsal ===
Grand Prix de Futsal record
Year	Round	M	W	D	L	GF	GA
(Brazil) 2005	did not enter						
(Brazil) 2006	did not enter						
(Brazil) 2007	did not enter						
(Brazil) 2008	did not enter						
(Brazil) 2009	did not enter						
(Brazil) 2010	Champions	6	6	0	0	35	9
(Brazil) 2011	did not enter						
(Brazil) 2013	did not enter						
(Brazil) 2014	did not enter						
(Brazil) 2015	did not enter						
(Brazil) 2017	to be determined						
Total	1/11	6	6	0	0	35	9

=== Confederations Cup ===
Futsal Confederations Cup record
Year	Round	M	W	D	L	GF	GA
(Libya) 2009	Withdrew						
(Brazil) 2013	did not enter						
(Kuwait) 2014	did not enter						
Total	1/3	0	0	0	0	0	0

=== Futsal Finalissima ===
Futsal Finalissima record
Year	Rank	M	W	D	L	GF	GA
(Argentina) 2022	Runners-up	2	1	0	1	4	1
(Brazil) 2026	Champions	2	2	0	0	5	2
Total: 2/2	1 title	4	3	0	1	9	3

== Honours ==
=== World achievements ===
The Spain national futsal team have won two FIFA Futsal World Cups (2000, 2004), appeared in five finals and one third/fourth place playoffs.

=== European achievements ===
The Spain national futsal team have won seven UEFA Futsal Championships (1996, 1999, 2005, 2007, 2010, 2012 and 2016), appeared in nine finals and three third/fourth place playoffs.

== Summary Results ==
As of 30 March 2024

Year	M	W	D	L	GF	GA	GD	Ref
1995	0	0	0	0	0	0	0	
1996	0	0	0	0	0	0	0	
1997	0	0	0	0	0	0	0	
1998	0	0	0	0	0	0	0	
1999	0	0	0	0	0	0	0	
2000	0	0	0	0	0	0	0	
2001	0	0	0	0	0	0	0	
2002	0	0	0	0	0	0	0	
2003	0	0	0	0	0	0	0	
2004	0	0	0	0	0	0	0	
2005	0	0	0	0	0	0	0	
2006	0	0	0	0	0	0	0	
2007	0	0	0	0	0	0	0	
2008	0	0	0	0	0	0	0	
2009	0	0	0	0	0	0	0	
2010	0	0	0	0	0	0	0	
2011	0	0	0	0	0	0	0	
2012	0	0	0	0	0	0	0	
2013	0	0	0	0	0	0	0	
2014	0	0	0	0	0	0	0	
2015	0	0	0	0	0	0	0	
2016	0	0	0	0	0	0	0	
2017	0	0	0	0	0	0	0	
2018	0	0	0	0	0	0	0	
2019	0	0	0	0	0	0	0	
2020	0	0	0	0	0	0	0	
2021	0	0	0	0	0	0	0	
2022	0	0	0	0	0	0	0	
2023	0	0	0	0	0	0	0	
2024	0	0	0	0	0	0	0	
Total	0	0	0	0	0	0	+0	

== See also ==
- Futsal in Spain
- Spain national football team

Achievements
Preceded by 1996 Brazil	World Champions; 2000 (First title); 2004 (Second title)	Succeeded by 2008 Brazil
