= Michal Belej =

Czech footballer and futsal player

Belej
Personal information
- Full name: Michal Belej
- Date of birth: 16 November 1982 (age 43)
- Place of birth: Jevíčko, Czechoslovakia
- Height: 1.77 m (5 ft 10 in)
- Position: Winger

Team information
- Current team: Tango Brno

Senior career*
Years	Team	Apps	(Gls)
2001–2007	Brno		
2005–2006	→ Dynamo České Budějovice (loan)		
2006–2007	→ Dosta Bystrc (loan)		

International career
- Czech Republic
- * Club domestic league appearances and goals

Michal Belej (born 16 November 1982) is a Czech futsal player and former footballer who plays for Tango Brno and the Czech Republic national futsal team. In his time as a footballer, he played for Brno in midfield.
