= Maksym Pavlenko =

Ukrainian footballer and futsal player

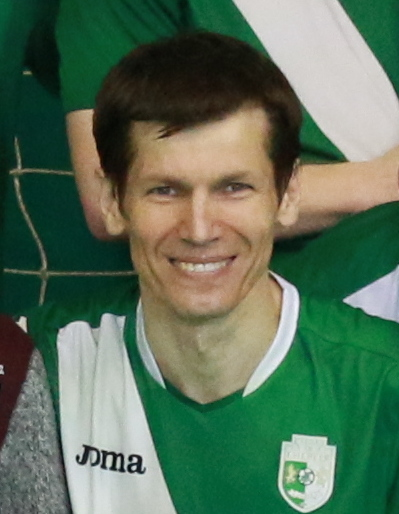

Personal information
- Full name: Maksym Mykhaylovych Pavlenko
- Date of birth: 15 September 1975 (age 51)
- Place of birth: Kyiv, Soviet Union
- Position: Winger

Team information
- Current team: Energy Lviv

Youth career
- FC Dynamo Kyiv

Senior career*
Years	Team	Apps	(Gls)
1993–1995	FC Dynamo Kyiv	0	(0)
1993	→ FC Dynamo-2 Kyiv	1	(0)
1993–1995	→ FC Dynamo-3 Kyiv	37	(0)
1995–2003	Interkas Kyiv	?	(?)
1998–2001	→ Interkas-2 Kyiv	5	(1)
2003–2005	MFC Shakhtar Donetsk	?	(?)
2004	→ MFC Shakhtar-2 Donetsk	1	(4)
2003–2004	→ Tytan Makiyivka (loan)	?	(?)
2005	→ LTK Luhansk (loan)	12	(5)
2005	→ LTK-2 Luhansk (loan)	1	(0)
2005–2006	Interkas Kyiv	?	(?)
2006–2008	Aqtobe-BTA	?	(76)
2008–2010	Time Lviv	?	(?)
2011–2016	Energy Lviv	152	(98)
2016–2017	Uragan Ivano-Frankivsk	15	(5)

International career
- Ukraine

Managerial career
- 2014–2016: Energy Lviv
- 2017–: Uragan Ivano-Frankivsk
- * Club domestic league appearances and goals

Maksym Pavlenko (Ukrainian: Максим Михайлович Павленко; born 15 September 1975) is a Ukrainian retired association football and futsal player who played for Interkas Kyiv, MFC Shakhtar Donetsk, Aqtobe-BTA, Time Lviv, Energy Lviv, Uragan Ivano-Frankivsk and the Ukraine national futsal team and current futsal coach.
