= Rizvan Farzaliyev =

Azerbaijani futsal player (born 1979)

Personal information
- Date of birth: 1 September 1979 (age 47)
- Place of birth: Azerbaijan
- Height: 1.78 m (5 ft 10 in)
- Position: Defender

Team information
- Current team: Araz Naxçivan
- Number: 8

Youth career
- 1998–2003: Neftci ISM

Senior career*
| Years | Team | Apps | (Gls) |
| 2003– | Araz Naxçivan | 167 | (56) |

International career
| 2003– | Azerbaijan | 66 | (33) |
- * Club domestic league appearances and goals

Rizvan Farzaliyev (born 1 September 1979) is an Azerbaijani futsal player who plays for Araz Naxçivan as a defender. He is captain of the Azerbaijan national team. He scored the last penalty in 2011, which helped his country to reach the semifinals, beating Ukraine, in Uefa Futsal Euro. Azerbaijan lost in to Portugal in the semifinals, in penalty shot out. It was the country's best performance in this sport. Rizvan Farzaliyev, by playing in all three games, equalled Lúcio's record of 69 UEFA futsal club appearances.
