= Araz Naxçivan =

Araz Naxçıvan
- Full name: Araz Minifutbol Klubu
- Founded: 2004
- Ground: Palace of Hand Games, Baku, Azerbaijan
- Capacity: 5,000
- Chairman: (Azerbaijan) Ramin Akhdundov
- Manager: (Azerbaijan) Shahin Mamedov
- Coach: vacant
- League: Premier League
Home colours	Away colours

Araz Naxçıvan is a futsal club based in Nakhchivan City, Azerbaijan. The club is very dominant in Azeri futsal, as they won ten consecutive Premier League titles from 2004 to 2014.

Araz is one of the strongest teams in Europe, having reached UEFA Futsal Cup semi finals two times.

== History ==
Araz Naxçivan founded in 2004 to replace a defunct football club in Azerbaijan Premier League and have dominated futsal in Azerbaijan ever since.

The team made their UEFA Futsal Cup debut in 2005, picking up four points from three first qualifying round games but the following season they reached the Elite round.

Araz reached semi-finals in the UEFA Futsal Cup in 2010 but lost out to Interviú FS. However, clinched third place after winning in penalties against Luparense. The club's players and coach Alesio, constituted the major part of the Azerbaijan squad that made their UEFA European Futsal Championship debut in 2010, reaching the semi-finals in Hungary.

In 2014, the club repeated their success by gaining third place in UEFA Futsal Cup.

In September 2024, the club's contract with head coach Vitaliy Borisov was mutually terminated, and the role of interim head coach was temporarily assigned to Serbian specialist Predrag Rayić.

== Honours ==
=== National ===
- 17 Premier League : 2005, 2006, 2007, 2008, 2009, 2010, 2011, 2012, 2013, 2014, 2016, 2017, 2018, 2019, 2020, 2022, 2023
- 14 Futsal Cup : 2005, 2006, 2007, 2008, 2009, 2010, 2011, 2012, 2013, 2014, 2016, 2017, 2018, 2019

=== International ===
- UEFA Futsal Cup:
  - 3rd place (2): 2010, 2014

== Current squad ==
As of 10 November 2024

#	Position	Name	Nationality
1	Goalkeeper	Emin Kurdov	(Azerbaijan)
	Goalkeeper	Ali Guliyev	(Azerbaijan)
7	Defender	Romao Lucas	(Brazil)
	Winger	Giovanny Valerio	(Brazil)
	Winger	Lazar Milosavljevic	(Serbia)
	Winger	Caique Aledes De Oliveira	(Brazil)
	Winger	Ramazan Atakishiyev	(Azerbaijan)
	Defender	Alisson Damasceno	(Brazil)
	Defender	Imameli Huseynov	(Azerbaijan)
	Defender	Nurlan Mammmadov	(Azerbaijan)
14	Defender	Khazar Agalizadeh	(Azerbaijan)
17	Defender	Emil Hasanzadeh	(Azerbaijan)
9	Winger	Novruz Kazıkhanov	(Azerbaijan)
	Defender	Gudrat Gasimzade	(Azerbaijan)
	Winger	Amirhossein Rasouli	(Iran)
	Defender	Ali Rostami	(Iran)

=== Notable players ===
- (Azerbaijan) Andrey Tveryankin
- (Azerbaijan) Serjão
- (Azerbaijan) Rizvan Farzaliyev
- (Azerbaijan) Thiago Paz
- (Azerbaijan) Vitaliy Borisov
- (Azerbaijan) Biro Jade
- (Serbia) Marko Perić
- (Brazil) (Italy) Adriano Foglia
- (Slovenia) Kristjan Čujec
- (Slovakia) Matej Klár

== UEFA Club Competitions record ==
Appearances: 16

Season	Competition	Round	Country	Opponent	Result	Venue (Host City)	Qualified
2005/06	UEFA Futsal Cup	First Round (Group 5)	(Belgium)	Morlanwelz	4–4	Sportska Dvorana; Bijeli Brijeg (Mostar)	3rd place
2005/06	UEFA Futsal Cup	First Round (Group 5)	(Bosnia and Herzegovina)	Karaka Mostar	2–4	Sportska Dvorana; Bijeli Brijeg (Mostar)	3rd place
2005/06	UEFA Futsal Cup	First Round (Group 5)	(Netherlands)	De Hommel	3–0	Sportska Dvorana; Bijeli Brijeg (Mostar)	3rd place
2006/07	UEFA Futsal Cup	Main Round (Group 2)	(Croatia)	MNK Split	5–3	Arena Gripe (Split)	1st place
2006/07	UEFA Futsal Cup	Main Round (Group 2)	(Greece)	Athina 90	5–1	Arena Gripe (Split)	1st place
2006/07	UEFA Futsal Cup	Main Round (Group 2)	(Sweden)	Skövde AIK	10–4	Arena Gripe (Split)	1st place
2006/07	UEFA Futsal Cup	Elite Round (Group C)	(Poland)	Clearex Chorzów	3–3	MORiS Hall (Chorzów)	4th place
2006/07	UEFA Futsal Cup	Elite Round (Group C)	(Belgium)	Action 21	4–6	MORiS Hall (Chorzów)	4th place
2006/07	UEFA Futsal Cup	Elite Round (Group C)	(Serbia)	Marbo	1–3	MORiS Hall (Chorzów)	4th place
2007/08	UEFA Futsal Cup	Main Round (Group 3)	(Italy)	Luparense	0–3	Baku; Sports Palace (Baku)	3rd place
2007/08	UEFA Futsal Cup	Main Round (Group 3)	(Moldova)	Camelot Chișinău	4–1	Baku; Sports Palace (Baku)	3rd place
2007/08	UEFA Futsal Cup	Main Round (Group 3)	(Slovakia)	Slov-Matic	3–4	Baku; Sports Palace (Baku)	3rd place
2008/09	UEFA Futsal Cup	Main Round (Group 6)	(Sweden)	Skövde AIK	11–2	Baku; Sports Palace (Baku)	1st place
2008/09	UEFA Futsal Cup	Main Round (Group 6)	(Bulgaria)	Nadin Sofia	6–1	Baku; Sports Palace (Baku)	1st place
2008/09	UEFA Futsal Cup	Main Round (Group 6)	(Slovakia)	Slov-Matic	4–2	Baku; Sports Palace (Baku)	1st place
2008/09	UEFA Futsal Cup	Elite Round (Group C)	(Croatia)	Nacional Zagreb	4–3	Dom Sportova (Zagreb)	2nd place
2008/09	UEFA Futsal Cup	Elite Round (Group C)	(Russia)	Dinamo Moskva	2–4	Dom Sportova (Zagreb)	2nd place
2008/09	UEFA Futsal Cup	Elite Round (Group C)	(Romania)	Odorheiu Secuiesc	6–4	Dom Sportova (Zagreb)	2nd place
2009/10	UEFA Futsal Cup	Main Round (Group 5)	(Cyprus)	Omonia	4–1	Mate Parlov; Sport Centre (Pula)	1st place
2009/10	UEFA Futsal Cup	Main Round (Group 5)	(Serbia)	Kolubara	4–0	Mate Parlov; Sport Centre (Pula)	1st place
2009/10	UEFA Futsal Cup	Main Round (Group 5)	(Croatia)	MNK Potpićan	4–4	Mate Parlov; Sport Centre (Pula)	1st place
2009/10	UEFA Futsal Cup	Elite Round (Group D)	(Latvia)	Nikars Riga	7–1	Baku; Sports Palace (Baku)	1st place
2009/10	UEFA Futsal Cup	Elite Round (Group D)	(Greece)	Athina 90	7–0	Baku; Sports Palace (Baku)	1st place
2009/10	UEFA Futsal Cup	Elite Round (Group D)	(Kazakhstan)	AFC Kairat	4–3	Baku; Sports Palace (Baku)	1st place
2009/10	UEFA Futsal Cup	Semifinals	(Spain)	Inter Movistar	2–5	Altice Arena (Lisbon)	
2009/10	UEFA Futsal Cup	3rd Place Match	(Italy)	Luparense	2–2 (5–4 p)	Altice Arena (Lisbon)	3rd Place
2010/11	UEFA Futsal Cup	Main Round (Group 3)	(Republic of Ireland)	Sporting Fingal	7–4	Sala Sporturilor (Târgu Mureş)	1st place
2010/11	UEFA Futsal Cup	Main Round (Group 3)	(Latvia)	Nikars Riga	7–2	Sala Sporturilor (Târgu Mureş)	1st place
2010/11	UEFA Futsal Cup	Main Round (Group 3)	(Romania)	City'US Târgu Mureş	3–1	Sala Sporturilor (Târgu Mureş)	1st place
2010/11	UEFA Futsal Cup	Elite Round (Group 2)	(Cyprus)	Ararat	2–1	Palace of Sporting Games (Yekaterinburg)	3rd place
2010/11	UEFA Futsal Cup	Elite Round (Group 2)	(Italy)	Montesilvano	2–2	Palace of Sporting Games (Yekaterinburg)	3rd place
2010/11	UEFA Futsal Cup	Elite Round (Group 2)	(Russia)	Viz-Sinara	2–3	Palace of Sporting Games (Yekaterinburg)	3rd place
2011/12	UEFA Futsal Cup	Elite Round (Group B)	(Netherlands)	CF Eindhoven	5–3	Palau Blaugrana (Barcelona)	2nd place
2011/12	UEFA Futsal Cup	Elite Round (Group B)	(Czech Republic)	Era-Pack Chrudim	3–4	Palau Blaugrana (Barcelona)	2nd place
2011/12	UEFA Futsal Cup	Elite Round (Group B)	(Spain)	FC Barcelona	2–2	Palau Blaugrana (Barcelona)	2nd place
2012/13	UEFA Futsal Cup	Main Round (Group 6)	(Republic of Ireland)	EID Futsal	0–5	Magvassy Mihály; Sportcsarnok (Győr)	2nd place
2012/13	UEFA Futsal Cup	Main Round (Group 6)	(Netherlands)	CF Eindhoven	4–3	Magvassy Mihály; Sportcsarnok (Győr)	2nd place
2012/13	UEFA Futsal Cup	Main Round (Group 6)	(Hungary)	Győri ETO FC	5–5	Magvassy Mihály; Sportcsarnok (Győr)	2nd place
2012/13	UEFA Futsal Cup	Elite Round (Group A)	(Slovenia)	FC Litija	3–5	Tri Lilije Hall (Laško)	3rd place
2012/13	UEFA Futsal Cup	Elite Round (Group A)	(Spain)	FC Barcelona	1–7	Tri Lilije Hall (Laško)	3rd place
2012/13	UEFA Futsal Cup	Elite Round (Group A)	(Croatia)	MNK Split	5–1	Tri Lilije Hall (Laško)	3rd place
2013/14	UEFA Futsal Cup	Main Round (Group 6)	(Greece)	Athina 90	5–1	Sala Sporturilor (Târgu Mureş)	1st place
2013/14	UEFA Futsal Cup	Main Round (Group 6)	(Belgium)	Châtelineau Futsal	3–1	Sala Sporturilor (Târgu Mureş)	1st place
2013/14	UEFA Futsal Cup	Main Round (Group 6)	(Romania)	City'US Târgu Mureş	3–3	Sala Sporturilor (Târgu Mureş)	1st place
2013/14	UEFA Futsal Cup	Elite Round (Group D)	(Netherlands)	CF Eindhoven	6–3	Municipal; Sports Complex (Almada)	1st place
2013/14	UEFA Futsal Cup	Elite Round (Group D)	(Hungary)	Győri ETO FC	5–0	Municipal; Sports Complex (Almada)	1st place
2013/14	UEFA Futsal Cup	Elite Round (Group D)	(Portugal)	Sporting CP	6–3	Municipal; Sports Complex (Almada)	1st place
2013/14	UEFA Futsal Cup	Semifinals	(Spain)	FC Barcelona	4–4 (2–4 p)	Sarhadchi; Sports Centre (Baku)	
2013/14	UEFA Futsal Cup	3rd Place Match	(Kazakhstan)	Kairat Almaty	6–4	Sarhadchi; Sports Centre (Baku)	3rd Place
2014/15	UEFA Futsal Cup	Elite Round (Group B)	(Slovakia)	Slov-Matic	3–4	Sportovní hala Dašická (Pardubice)	4th place
2014/15	UEFA Futsal Cup	Elite Round (Group B)	(Russia)	MFK Dina Moskva	4–5	Sportovní hala Dašická (Pardubice)	4th place
2014/15	UEFA Futsal Cup	Elite Round (Group B)	(Czech Republic)	Era-Pack Chrudim	0–6	Sportovní hala Dašická (Pardubice)	4th place
2016/17	UEFA Futsal Cup	Main Round (Group 2)	(Georgia (country))	Tbilisi State University	7–1	Boris Trajkovski; Sports Center (Skopje)	1st place
2016/17	UEFA Futsal Cup	Main Round (Group 2)	(Kosovo)	FC Feniks	1–0	Boris Trajkovski; Sports Center (Skopje)	1st place
2016/17	UEFA Futsal Cup	Main Round (Group 2)	(North Macedonia)	Železarec Skopje	15–4	Boris Trajkovski; Sports Center (Skopje)	1st place
2016/17	UEFA Futsal Cup	Elite Round (Group B)	(Croatia)	Nacional Zagreb	1–2	Dom Sportova (Zagreb)	3rd place
2016/17	UEFA Futsal Cup	Elite Round (Group B)	(Russia)	Ugra Yugorsk	0–4	Dom Sportova (Zagreb)	3rd place
2016/17	UEFA Futsal Cup	Elite Round (Group B)	(Germany)	Hamburg Panthers	5–1	Dom Sportova (Zagreb)	3rd place
2017/18	UEFA Futsal Cup	Main Round (Group 8)	(Bosnia and Herzegovina)	Mostar Stari Grad	5–2	Sports Hall (Deva)	2nd place
2017/18	UEFA Futsal Cup	Main Round (Group 8)	(Malta)	Luxol St Andrews	6–4	Sports Hall (Deva)	2nd place
2017/18	UEFA Futsal Cup	Main Round (Group 8)	(Romania)	Autobergamo Deva	3–6	Sports Hall (Deva)	2nd place
2018/19	UEFA Futsal; Champions League	Main Round (Group 8)	(Lithuania)	Vytis	0–1	Športová hala Aréna Lučenec (Lučenec)	3rd place
2018/19	UEFA Futsal; Champions League	Main Round (Group 8)	(Malta)	Valletta	1–1	Športová hala Aréna Lučenec (Lučenec)	3rd place
2018/19	UEFA Futsal; Champions League	Main Round (Group 8)	(Slovakia)	FK Lučenec	2–5	Športová hala Aréna Lučenec (Lučenec)	3rd place
2019/20	UEFA Futsal; Champions League	Main Round (Group 2)	(Belgium)	Halle-Gooik	1–5	Sportcomplex; De Bres (Halle)	4th place
2019/20	UEFA Futsal; Champions League	Main Round (Group 2)	(Portugal)	Benfica	0–7	Sportcomplex; De Bres (Halle)	4th place
2019/20	UEFA Futsal; Champions League	Main Round (Group 2)	(Ukraine)	Prodexim Kherson	3–8	Sportcomplex; De Bres (Halle)	4th place
2020/21	UEFA Futsal; Champions League	Preliminary Round	(Greece)	AEK	3–3 (3-4 p)	Dais Sports Hall (Athens)	
2021/22	UEFA Futsal; Champions League	Preliminary Round (Group F)	(Gibraltar)	Europa FC	9–2	Salaspils; Sporta Nams (Salaspils)	2nd place
2021/22	UEFA Futsal; Champions League	Preliminary Round (Group F)	(Finland)	Kampuksen Dynamo	4–4	Salaspils; Sporta Nams (Salaspils)	2nd place
2021/22	UEFA Futsal; Champions League	Preliminary Round (Group F)	(Latvia)	FK Raba	8–4	Salaspils; Sporta Nams (Salaspils)	2nd place
2021/22	UEFA Futsal; Champions League	Main Round (Group 6)	(Ukraine)	Uragan	1–2	Hall IF College of Physical Education (Ivano-Frankivsk)	2nd place
2021/22	UEFA Futsal; Champions League	Main Round (Group 6)	(Romania)	United Galati	5–3	Hall IF College of Physical Education (Ivano-Frankivsk)	2nd place
2021/22	UEFA Futsal; Champions League	Main Round (Group 6)	(Kosovo)	FC Liqeni	6–6	Hall IF College of Physical Education (Ivano-Frankivsk)	2nd place
2022/23	UEFA Futsal; Champions League	Main Round (Group 5)	(Sweden)	Örebro SK	2–5	USCR Midhat; Hujdur-Hujka (Mostar)	4th place
2022/23	UEFA Futsal; Champions League	Main Round (Group 5)	(Serbia)	Loznica-Grad	1–4	USCR Midhat; Hujdur-Hujka (Mostar)	4th place
2022/23	UEFA Futsal; Champions League	Main Round (Group 5)	(Bosnia and Herzegovina)	Mostar SG	2–3	USCR Midhat; Hujdur-Hujka (Mostar)	4th place
2023/24	UEFA Futsal; Champions League	Preliminary Round (Group A)	(Turkey)	Istanbul Şişli	9–1	Salaspils; Sporta Nams (Salaspils)	2nd place
2023/24	UEFA Futsal; Champions League	Preliminary Round (Group A)	(Germany)	Jahn Regensburg	5–0	Salaspils; Sporta Nams (Salaspils)	2nd place
2023/24	UEFA Futsal; Champions League	Preliminary Round (Group A)	(Latvia)	Riga Futsal Club	3–8	Salaspils; Sporta Nams (Salaspils)	2nd place
2024/25	UEFA Futsal; Champions League	Preliminary Round (Group H)	(Northern Ireland)	Sparta Belfast	7–1	Agnebergshallen (Uddevalla)	2nd place
2024/25	UEFA Futsal; Champions League	Preliminary Round (Group H)	(Estonia)	Sillamäe Silla	0-7	Agnebergshallen (Uddevalla)	2nd place
2024/25	UEFA Futsal; Champions League	Preliminary Round (Group H)	(Sweden)	Uddevalla	3:4	Agnebergshallen (Uddevalla)	2nd place

=== Summary ===
UEFA competitions
Competition	Played	Won	Drawn	Lost	Goals For	Goals Against	Goal Difference	Last season played
UEFA Futsal Cup	61	35	7	19	250	174	+76	2017–18
UEFA Futsal; Champions League	16	3	3	10	48	63	-15	2022–23
Total	77	38	10	29	298	237	+61	
