= Azerbaijan national futsal team =

Azerbaijan
- Nickname(s): Milli (The National Team)
- Association: AFFA
- Confederation: UEFA (Europe)
- Head coach: (Azerbaijan) Vitaliy Borisov
- Captain: Emin Kurdov
- Most caps: Rizvan Farzaliyev (42)
- Top scorer: Vitaliy Borisov (23)
- FIFA code: AZE
- FIFA ranking: 55 (24 September 2026)
Home colours	Away colours

First international
- Poland 4–6 Azerbaijan (Goirle, Netherlands; 23 October 1995)

Biggest win
- Kazakhstan 2–14 Azerbaijan (Tbilisi, Georgia; 28 July 2002)

Biggest defeat
- Uzbekistan 13–2 Azerbaijan (Riyadh, Saudi Arabia; 6 November 2025)

FIFA World Cup
- Appearances: 1 (First in 2016)
- Best result: Quarterfinals (2016)

European Championship
- Appearances: 6 (First in 2010)
- Best result: 4th place (2010)

The Azerbaijan national futsal team is the national futsal team of Azerbaijan and is controlled by the Association of Football Federations of Azerbaijan. It represents Azerbaijan in international futsal competitions such as the FIFA Futsal World Cup and the European Championships. They are ranked 13th in the world, the highest-ranking team from Caucasus in the World Rankings. They are also ranked 7th in Europe on 10 August 2021.

Azerbaijan had never qualified for the FIFA Futsal World Cup until 2016, but they have participated in the last five editions of the European Championship.

== History ==
=== Recently ===
Azerbaijan's first appearance at the big level came during the 2010 UEFA Futsal Championship. They were unbeaten in qualifying and finished second to Portugal in their group, and only then after conceding a late equalizer against the 2007 semi-finalists. Alesio has put together a potent blend of naturalized South Americans and local talent like Vitaliy Borisov and the Brazilian coach and much of the Azerbaijan squad are involved with champion club Araz Naxçivan, who in November won through to this spring's four-team UEFA Futsal Cup finals. Despite finishing in fourth place, Azerbaijan's finals run was the best showing by a debutant since the inaugural UEFA Futsal Championship tournament. Azerbaijan's Biro Jade won the Golden Boot award as joint top scorer with five goals.

== Tournament records ==
=== FIFA Futsal World Cup ===
FIFA Futsal World Cup record										Qualification record						
Year	Round	Position	Pld	W	D	L	GF	GA	Squad	Outcome	Pld	W	D	L	GF	GA
(Netherlands) 1989	Part of Soviet Union									Part of Soviet Union						
(Hong Kong) 1992	Not a FIFA member									Part of CIS						
(Spain) 1996	Did not qualify									1996 UEFA Futsal Championship qualifying served as qualifiers						
(Guatemala) 2000	Did not qualify									Group D 3rd place	4	1	1	2	19	22
(Taiwan) 2004	Did not qualify									Group 7 Runners-up	2	0	1	1	5	10
(Brazil) 2008	Did not qualify									Group 6 Runners-up	3	2	0	1	15	6
(Thailand) 2012	Did not qualify									Play-offs	5	2	1	2	16	11
(Colombia) 2016	Quarterfinals	6th	5	2	1	2	25	18	Squad	Play-offs	5	3	2	0	28	13
(Lithuania) 2021	Did not qualify									Group C 3rd place	6	4	1	1	15	11
(Uzbekistan) 2024	Did not qualify									Group A 4th place	10	4	0	6	29	31
Total	Quarterfinals	1/10	5	2	1	2	25	18	—	7/8	40	17	6	17	139	129

=== UEFA European Futsal Championship ===
UEFA Futsal Euro record									Qualification record						
Year	Round	Pld	W	D	L	GF	GA	Squad	Outcome	Pld	W	D	L	GF	GA
(Spain) 1996	Did not qualify								Group A 6th place	5	1	0	4	12	25
(Spain) 1999	Did not qualify								Group B Runners-up	2	0	2	0	4	4
(Russia) 2001	Did not qualify								Group C 3rd place	3	1	1	1	12	8
(Italy) 2003	Did not qualify								Group E 3rd place	3	1	0	2	5	9
(Czech Republic) 2005	Did not qualify								Group E 3rd place	3	1	0	2	8	10
(Portugal) 2007	Did not qualify								Group D Runners-up	3	1	2	0	17	12
(Hungary) 2010	4th Place	5	2	2	1	18	13	Squad	Group 6 Runners-up	3	2	1	0	12	7
(Croatia) 2012	Group stage	2	0	0	2	9	13	Squad	Group 1 Runners-up	3	2	0	1	13	13
(Belgium) 2014	Group stage	2	1	0	1	7	13	Squad	Group 2 Winners	3	3	0	0	11	3
(Serbia) 2016	Quarterfinals	3	1	0	2	8	14	Squad	Play-offs	5	3	1	1	20	8
(Slovenia) 2018	Quarterfinals	3	1	0	2	6	12	Squad	Group 2 Winners	3	3	0	0	16	5
(Netherlands) 2022	Group stage	3	1	1	1	8	7	Squad	Group 3 Winners	6	5	1	0	22	6
(Latvia) (Lithuania) (Slovenia) 2026	Did not qualify								Group 5 Fourth place	6	0	2	4	13	25
Total	6/13	18	6	3	9	56	72	—	13/13	48	23	10	15	165	135

=== Islamic Solidarity Games ===
Islamic Solidarity Games record
Year	Round	Rank	M	W	D	L	GF	GA	GD
(Saudi Arabia) 2025	6th	6th	3	1	0	2	7	22	-15
Total	-	1/1	3	1	0	2	7	22	-15

=== Minor tournament ===
this table consist of only senior A team Results (not include Youth and club match results)

Four/Three Nations Cup
Year	Round	Pld	W	D	L	GS	GA	Dif	Pts
(Georgia (country)) 2002 Tbilisi Cup	Third place	2	1	0	1	15	7	+8	3
(Turkey) 2007 Izmir Cup	Champions	3	3	0	0	19	7	+12	9
(Azerbaijan) 2008 Baku Cup	Champions	2	2	0	0	7	4	+3	6
(Azerbaijan) 2009-1 Baku Cup	Champions	2	2	0	0	10	4	+6	6
(Azerbaijan) 2009-2 Baku Cup	Champions	2	2	0	0	11	3	+8	6
(Azerbaijan) 2011 Baku Cup	Champions	3	3	0	0	15	4	+11	9
(Azerbaijan) 2012 Baku Cup	Runners-up	3	1	1	1	7	7	0	4
(Azerbaijan) 2013 Baku Cup	Champions	3	3	0	0	14	3	+11	9
(Uzbekistan) 2014 Tashkent Cup	Runners-up	3	2	0	1	9	8	+1	6
(Moldova) 2015 Cupa FMF Cup	Runners-up	1	0	1	0	1	1	0	1
Total	10/10	24	19	2	3	108	48	+60	58

- https://web.archive.org/web/20161117212236/http://www.futsalplanet.com/news/news-01.asp?id=720
- https://web.archive.org/web/20100118022640/http://futsalplanet.com/agenda/agenda-01.asp?id=7807
- https://web.archive.org/web/20100118020423/http://futsalplanet.com/agenda/agenda-01.asp?id=8305
- https://web.archive.org/web/20090206223856/http://futsalplanet.com/agenda/agenda-01.asp?id=10230
- https://web.archive.org/web/20100106044728/http://www.futsalplanet.com/agenda/agenda-01.asp?id=12027
- https://web.archive.org/web/20161108195643/http://www.futsalplanet.com/agenda/agenda-01.asp?id=18825
- https://web.archive.org/web/20161117211959/http://www.futsalplanet.com/agenda/agenda-01.asp?id=18981

=== All time general statistics record/Overview of results ===
- As a 15 Nov 2016

Tournament	Pld	W	D	L	GS	GA	Dif	Pts
FIFA World Cup Record	5	2	1	2	25	18	+7	7
FIFA World Cup Qualification Record	24	9	4	11	92	91	+1	31
European Championship Record	12	4	2	6	42	53	-11	14
European Championship Qualification Record	28	14	7	7	103	73	+40	49
Minor Tournament Record	24	19	2	3	108	48	+60	59
Friendly Match Record	36	17	8	11	105	90	+15	59
Total	129	65	24	40	475	373	+102	219

- Source:https://web.archive.org/web/20161116194204/http://www.futsalplanet.com/matches/index.asp

== Players ==
=== Current squad ===
The following players were called up to the squad for the UEFA 2024 FIFA Futsal World Cup qualification matches against Kazakhstan on 6 and 11 October 2023.
Head coach: Vitaliy Borisov

No.	Pos.	Player	Date of birth (age)	Caps	Goals	Club
1	GK	Emin Kurdov (captain)	10 July 1984 (age 42)			(Association of Football Federations of Azerbaijan) Araz Naxçivan
12	GK	Rovshan Huseynli	3 April 1991 (age 35)			(Kazakhstan Football Federation) MFC Atyrau
6	DF	Eduardo Borges	14 October 1986 (age 40)			(Royal Belgian Football Association) Anderlecht
7	DF	Hadi Ahmadi	26 February 1994 (age 32)			(Kazakhstan Football Federation) MFC Aktobe
13	DF	Gallo	4 December 1987 (age 38)			(Royal Spanish Football Federation) Manzanares FS
14	DF	Amadeu	6 March 1990 (age 36)			(Association of Football Federations of Azerbaijan) Araz Naxçivan
17	DF	Amir Shojaei	1 April 1988 (age 38)			(Association of Football Federations of Azerbaijan) Neftçi İK
20	DF	Biel	26 April 1990 (age 36)			(Hellenic Football Federation) Doukas
4	FW	Murad Guluzadeh	14 June 1996 (age 30)			(Association of Football Federations of Azerbaijan) Baku Fire
5	FW	Maneca	9 May 1997 (age 29)			(Hungarian Football Federation) Futsal Nyíregyháza
8	FW	Novruz Kazikhanov	26 December 2002 (age 23)			(Association of Football Federations of Azerbaijan) Araz Naxçivan
9	FW	Rafael Vilela	12 March 1993 (age 33)			(Royal Belgian Football Association) Anderlecht
10	FW	Felipinho	26 October 1993 (age 32)			(Association of Football Federations of Azerbaijan) Araz Naxçivan
11	FW	Khatai Baghirov	15 August 1987 (age 39)			(Association of Football Federations of Azerbaijan) Araz Naxçivan
16	FW	Khazar Agalizadeh	31 December 2003 (age 22)			(Association of Football Federations of Azerbaijan) Araz Naxçivan

=== Recent call-ups ===
The following players have also been called up to the squad within the last 12 months.

Pos.	Player	Date of birth (age)	Caps	Goals	Club	Latest call-up
^{COV} Player withdrew from the squad due to contracting COVID-19.^{INJ} Player withdrew from the squad due to an injury.^{PRE} Preliminary squad.^{RET} Retired from international futsal.

== Results and Fixtures ==
=== 2025 ===
4 November 2025	Libya	4–5	Azerbaijan	Saudi Arabian Olympic Committee Complex Green Hall 1, Riyadh
16:00	Abdulhalim Al-Serksia 2', 27'; Mohamed Ghaeb 11'; Ahmed Al-Yumni 39'	Report	Fərid Abbasov 1', 21', 33'; Mirzə Əmirov 36', 36'

6 November 2025	Uzbekistan	13–2	Azerbaijan	Saudi Arabian Olympic Committee Complex Green Hall 1, Riyadh
16:00	Ilkhomjon Khamroev 3', 28'; Muzaffar Akhadjonov 10', 23', 35'; Muhammadali Khusanboev 15', 18', 40'; Akbar Usmonov 25', 32'; Abror Akhmetzyanov 27'; Khayrullo Solikhov 30'; Eldor Nigmatov 33'	Report	Emil Həsənzadə 11'; Fərid Abbasov 26'

8 November 2025	Saudi Arabia	5–0	Azerbaijan	Saudi Arabian Olympic Committee Complex Green Hall 1, Riyadh
19:00	Abdullah Al-Maghrabi 6'; Eihab Mohamed 9'; Abdullah Al-Aqeeli 10'; Fahad Al-Johani 13'; Fahad Rudayni 40'	Report

== Managers ==
- (Azerbaijan) Elman Alakbarov (2008–2009)
- (Brazil) Alesio (2009-2014)
- (Spain) Tino Perez (2014-2016)
- (Brazil) Miltinho (2016-2017)
- (Brazil) (Azerbaijan) Biro Jade (2017-2018)
- (Brazil) Alesio (2018-2023)
- (Azerbaijan) Vitaliy Borisov (2023-present)

== See also ==
- Araz Naxçivan
- Azerbaijan national football team
- Baku United
