= UEFA Futsal Euro 2012 squads =

This article lists the confirmed national futsal squads for the UEFA Futsal Euro 2012 tournament held in Croatia, between January 30 and February 11, 2012.

== Group A ==
=== Croatia ===
Head coach: Mato Stanković

No.	Pos.	Player	Date of birth (age)	Caps	Goals	Club
1	GK	Ivo Jukić	13 April 1986 (aged 25)			(Croatian Football Federation) MNK Split Brodosplit Inženjering
12	GK	Marin Stojkić	30 September 1984 (aged 27)			(Croatian Football Federation) MNK Murter
2	DF	Vedran Matošević	27 August 1990 (aged 21)			(Croatian Football Federation) MNK Uspinjaca Zagreb
3	DF	Jakov Grcić	12 April 1983 (aged 28)			(Croatian Football Federation) MNK Uspinjaca Zagreb
4	DF	Matija Dulvat	22 February 1976 (aged 35)			(Croatian Football Federation) MNK Uspinjaca Zagreb
5	DF	Frane Despotović	25 April 1982 (aged 29)			(Polish Football Association) Akademia FC Pniewy
10	DF	Tihomir Novak	24 October 1986 (aged 25)			(Croatian Football Federation) MNK Split Brodosplit Inženjering
13	DF	Branko Laura	21 October 1982 (aged 29)			(Croatian Football Federation) MNK Split Brodosplit Inženjering
6	FW	Saša Babić	4 August 1989 (aged 22)			(Croatian Football Federation) MNK Kijevo Knauf
7	FW	Franko Jelovčić	6 July 1991 (aged 20)			(Croatian Football Federation) MNK Split Brodosplit Inženjering
8	FW	Dario Marinović	24 May 1990 (aged 21)			(Croatian Football Federation) MNK Split Brodosplit Inženjering
9	FW	Duje Bajrušovic	27 October 1984 (aged 27)			(Croatian Football Federation) MNK Split Brodosplit Inženjering
11	FW	Josip Šuton	14 November 1988 (aged 23)			(Croatian Football Federation) MNK Split Brodosplit Inženjering
14	FW	Denis Mijatović	1 June 1983 (aged 28)			(Croatian Football Federation) MNK Vrgorac GTP

=== Czech Republic ===
Head coach: Tomáš Neumann

No.	Pos.	Player	Date of birth (age)	Caps	Goals	Club
1	GK	Jakub Zdánský	28 May 1986 (aged 25)			(Football Association of the Czech Republic) Era-Pack Chrudim
12	GK	Libor Gerčák	22 July 1975 (aged 36)			(Football Association of the Czech Republic) 1.FC Nejzbach Vysoké Mýto
3	DF	Petr Oliva	23 October 1987 (aged 24)			(Football Association of the Czech Republic) SK Slavia Praha
4	DF	Jiří Novotný	12 July 1988 (aged 23)			(Football Association of the Czech Republic) FC Bohemians 1905 Praha
6	DF	Roman Mareš	15 March 1975 (aged 36)			(Football Association of the Czech Republic) Era-Pack Chrudim
9	DF	David Frič	17 February 1983 (aged 28)			(Slovak Football Association) Slov-Matic Bratislava
11	DF	Michal Mareš I	3 February 1976 (aged 35)			(Football Association of the Czech Republic) Era-Pack Chrudim
5	MF	Josef Havel	12 February 1982 (aged 29)			(Football Association of the Czech Republic) Tango Brno
7	FW	Lukáš Rešetár	28 April 1984 (aged 27)			(Football Association of the Czech Republic) Era-Pack Chrudim
8	FW	Marek Kopecký	19 February 1977 (aged 34)			(Football Association of the Czech Republic) FC Bohemians 1905 Praha
10	FW	Michal Seidler	5 April 1990 (aged 21)			(Football Association of the Czech Republic) Tango Brno
13	FW	Zdeněk Sláma	28 December 1982 (aged 29)			(Slovak Football Association) Slov-Matic Bratislava
14	FW	Jan Janovský	20 June 1985 (aged 26)			(Polish Football Association) Rekord Bielsko-Biela
18	FW	Michal Belej	16 November 1982 (aged 29)			(Football Association of the Czech Republic) Tango Brno

=== Romania ===
Head coach: Sito Rivera

No.	Pos.	Player	Date of birth (age)	Caps	Goals	Club
1	GK	Vlad Iancu	3 January 1978 (aged 34)			(Romanian Football Federation) United Galati
12	GK	Ionuţ Florea	7 September 1980 (aged 31)			(Romanian Football Federation) CS Dava Deva
4	DF	Florin Ignat	26 February 1982 (aged 29)			(Romanian Football Federation) City'us Târgu Mureş
5	DF	Gabriel Dobre	14 April 1980 (aged 31)			(Hungarian Football Federation) Győri ETO FC
8	DF	Marian Șotărcă	12 November 1980 (aged 31)			(Royal Spanish Football Federation) FC Andorra
2	FW	Florin Matei	8 December 1983 (aged 28)			(Romanian Football Federation) City'us Târgu Mureş
3	FW	Răzvan Radu	4 July 1984 (aged 27)			(Romanian Football Federation) City'us Târgu Mureş
6	FW	Emil Răducu	19 May 1984 (aged 27)			(Royal Spanish Football Federation) FC Andorra
7	FW	Robert Lupu	28 October 1982 (aged 29)			(Romanian Football Federation) City'us Târgu Mureş
9	FW	Ion Al-Ioani	7 May 1983 (aged 28)			(Hungarian Football Federation) Győri ETO FC
10	FW	Dumitru Stoica	30 September 1981 (aged 30)			(Romanian Football Federation) City'us Târgu Mureş
11	FW	Cosmin Gherman	25 April 1984 (aged 27)			(Romanian Football Federation) United Galati
13	FW	Iuliu Safar	22 April 1985 (aged 26)			(Royal Spanish Football Federation) Gáldar FS
14	FW	Alpar Csoma	22 March 1984 (aged 27)			(Romanian Football Federation) City'us Târgu Mureş

== Group B ==
=== Spain ===
Head coach: José Venancio López Hierro

No.	Pos.	Player	Date of birth (age)	Caps	Goals	Club
1	GK	Luis Amado	4 May 1976 (aged 35)			(Royal Spanish Football Federation) Inter Movistar
12	GK	Juanjo	19 August 1985 (aged 26)			(Royal Spanish Football Federation) Inter Movistar
13	GK	Cristian	27 August 1982 (aged 29)			(Royal Spanish Football Federation) FC Barcelona
2	DF	Ortiz	3 October 1983 (aged 28)			(Royal Spanish Football Federation) Inter Movistar
4	DF	Jordi Torras	24 September 1980 (aged 31)			(Royal Spanish Football Federation) FC Barcelona
16	DF	Aicardo	4 December 1988 (aged 23)			(Royal Spanish Football Federation) Lobelle de Santiago
8	DF	Kike	4 May 1978 (aged 33)			(Royal Spanish Football Federation) ElPozo Murcia
6	MF	Álvaro	29 September 1977 (aged 34)			(Royal Spanish Football Federation) Inter Movistar
3	MF	Sergio Lozano	9 September 1988 (aged 23)			(Royal Spanish Football Federation) FC Barcelona
10	MF	Borja Blanco	16 November 1984 (aged 27)			(Royal Spanish Football Federation) Caja Segovia
11	MF	Lin	16 May 1986 (aged 25)			(Royal Spanish Football Federation) FC Barcelona
14	MF	Alemao	25 June 1976 (aged 35)			(Russian Football Union) MFK Dina Moskva
15	MF	Miguelín	9 May 1985 (aged 26)			(Royal Spanish Football Federation) ElPozo Murcia
9	FW	Rafa Usín	22 May 1987 (aged 24)			(Royal Spanish Football Federation) Triman Navarra

=== Ukraine ===
Head coach: Gennadii Lisenchuk

No.	Pos.	Player	Date of birth (age)	Caps	Goals	Club
1	GK	Yevhen Ivanyak	28 September 1982 (aged 29)			(Ukrainian Association of Football) Lokomotyv Kharkiv
12	GK	Kyrylo Tsypun	30 July 1987 (aged 24)			(Ukrainian Association of Football) Uragan Ivano-Frankivsk
14	GK	Dmytro Lytvynenko	16 April 1987 (aged 24)			(Ukrainian Association of Football) Lokomotyv Kharkiv
2	DF	Valeriy Zamyatin	5 January 1979 (aged 33)			(Ukrainian Association of Football) Enakievez Enakievo
3	DF	Vitaliy Kiselyov	20 February 1983 (aged 28)			(Ukrainian Association of Football) Lokomotyv Kharkiv
10	DF	Valeriy Legchanov	13 February 1980 (aged 31)			(Ukrainian Association of Football) Energy Lviv
4	FW	Serhiy Zhurba	14 March 1987 (aged 24)			(Ukrainian Association of Football) Lokomotyv Kharkiv
5	FW	Yevgen Rogachov	30 August 1983 (aged 28)			(Ukrainian Association of Football) Energy Lviv
6	FW	Serhiy Cheporniuk	18 April 1982 (aged 29)			(Ukrainian Association of Football) Energy Lviv
7	FW	Maxym Pavlenko	15 September 1975 (aged 36)			(Ukrainian Association of Football) Energy Lviv
8	FW	Dmitriy Klochko	17 February 1987 (aged 24)			(Ukrainian Association of Football) Lokomotyv Kharkiv
9	FW	Oleksandr Kondratyuk	9 April 1983 (aged 28)			(Ukrainian Association of Football) Lokomotyv Kharkiv
11	FW	Denys Ovsyannikov	10 December 1984 (aged 27)			(Ukrainian Association of Football) Energy Lviv
13	FW	Dmytro Sorokin	14 July 1988 (aged 23)			(Ukrainian Association of Football) Lokomotyv Kharkiv

=== Slovenia ===
Head coach: Andrej Dobovičnik

No.	Pos.	Player	Date of birth (age)	Caps	Goals	Club
1	GK	Aljoša Mohorič	26 November 1980 (aged 31)			(Football Association of Slovenia) KMN Puntar
12	GK	Damir Puškar	3 September 1987 (aged 24)			(Football Association of Slovenia) FC Litija
16	GK	Alen Mordej	13 March 1990 (aged 21)			(Football Association of Slovenia) KMN Dobovec
7	DF	Igor Osredkar	28 June 1986 (aged 25)			(Football Association of Slovenia) FC Litija
8	DF	Benjamin Melink	15 November 1982 (aged 29)			(Football Association of Slovenia) KMN Puntar
10	DF	Gaj Rosič	14 May 1987 (aged 24)			(Football Association of Slovenia) FC Kobarid
11	DF	Alen Fetić	14 October 1991 (aged 20)			(Football Association of Slovenia) FC Litija
2	FW	Rok Mordej	3 March 1989 (aged 22)			(Football Association of Slovenia) KMN Dobovec
3	FW	Primož Zorč	28 December 1977 (aged 34)			(Football Association of Slovenia) FC Kobarid
4	FW	Sebastjan Drobne	19 April 1987 (aged 24)			(Football Association of Slovenia) KMN Dobovec
5	FW	Kristjan Čujec	30 November 1988 (aged 23)			(Royal Spanish Football Federation) Ribera Navarra
6	FW	Rok Grzelj	17 August 1982 (aged 29)			(Football Association of Slovenia) KMN Bronx
9	FW	Rajko Uršič	20 March 1981 (aged 30)			(Football Association of Slovenia) FC Kobarid
18	FW	Damir Pertič	10 July 1981 (aged 30)			(Football Association of Slovenia) FC Litija

== Group C ==
=== Italy ===
Head coach: Roberto Menichelli

No.	Pos.	Player	Date of birth (age)	Caps	Goals	Club
1	GK	Stefano Mammarella	2 February 1984 (aged 27)			(Italian Football Federation) Montesilvano
12	GK	Valerio Barigelli	19 October 1982 (aged 29)			(Italian Football Federation) Ponzio Pescara
20	GK	Michele Miarelli	29 August 1984 (aged 27)			(Italian Football Federation) Canottierilazio Futsal
2	DF	Marco Ercolessi	15 May 1986 (aged 25)			(Italian Football Federation) Franco Gomme Venezia
3	DF	Marcio Forte	23 April 1977 (aged 34)			(Italian Football Federation) SS Lazio C5
14	DF	Marco Torcivia	4 May 1982 (aged 29)			(Italian Football Federation) Acireale
6	MF	Humberto Honorio	21 July 1983 (aged 28)			(Italian Football Federation) Alter Ego Luparense
7	MF	Jairo Manoel Vampeta	18 July 1984 (aged 27)			(Italian Football Federation) Alter Ego Luparense
8	MF	Alessandro Patias	8 July 1985 (aged 26)			(Italian Football Federation) Asti Acqua Eva
10	MF	Luca Ippoliti	31 October 1979 (aged 32)			(Italian Football Federation) SS Lazio C5
11	MF	Saad Assis	26 October 1979 (aged 32)			(Royal Spanish Football Federation) FC Barcelona
13	DF	Gabriel Lima	19 August 1987 (aged 24)			(Italian Football Federation) Asti Acqua Eva
4	FW	Sergio Romano	28 September 1987 (aged 24)			(Italian Football Federation) Cogianco Genzano Futsal
9	FW	Rodolfo Fortino	30 April 1983 (aged 28)			(Italian Football Federation) Alter Ego Luparense

=== Russia ===
Head coach: Sergei Skorovich

No.	Pos.	Player	Date of birth (age)	Caps	Goals	Club
1	GK	Sergei Zuev	20 February 1980 (aged 31)			(Russian Football Union) MFK Viz-Sinara Yekaterinburg
12	GK	Gustavo	5 February 1979 (aged 32)			(Russian Football Union) Sibiryak Novosibirsk
2	DF	Anatoli Badretdinov	1 September 1984 (aged 27)			(Russian Football Union) MFK Dinamo Moskva
4	DF	Dmitri Prudnikov	6 January 1988 (aged 24)			(Russian Football Union) MFK Viz-Sinara Yekaterinburg
5	DF	Sergei Sergeev	28 June 1983 (aged 28)			(Russian Football Union) CSKA Moskva
7	DF	Pula	2 December 1980 (aged 31)			(Russian Football Union) MFK Dinamo Moskva
10	DF	Konstantin Maevski	5 October 1979 (aged 32)			(Russian Football Union) CSKA Moskva
14	MF	Ivan Milovanov	8 February 1989 (aged 22)			(Russian Football Union) MFK Tyumen
15	MF	Ildar Nugumanov	5 May 1988 (aged 23)			(Russian Football Union) MFK Tyumen
3	FW	Nikolai Pereverzev	15 December 1986 (aged 25)			(Russian Football Union) MFK Tyumen
8	FW	Nikolai Maltsev	14 April 1986 (aged 25)			(Russian Football Union) MFK Viz-Sinara Yekaterinburg
9	FW	Sergei Abramov	9 September 1990 (aged 21)			(Russian Football Union) MFK Viz-Sinara Yekaterinburg
11	FW	Cirilo	20 January 1980 (aged 32)			(Russian Football Union) MFK Dinamo Moskva
13	FW	Aleksandr Fukin	26 March 1985 (aged 26)			(Russian Football Union) MFK Dinamo Moskva

=== Turkey ===
Head coach: Ömer Kaner

No.	Pos.	Player	Date of birth (age)	Caps	Goals	Club
1	GK	Hüseyin Yıldız	27 April 1979 (aged 32)			(Royal Belgian Football Association) Châtelineau
12	GK	Mahmut Akbaş	1 January 1981 (aged 31)			-
13	GK	Şenol Çiraci	24 November 1988 (aged 23)			-
3	DF	Serhat Çiçek	7 February 1987 (aged 24)			(Turkish Football Federation) Belediyesi Bodrumspor
4	DF	Yasin Erdal	30 May 1984 (aged 27)			(Royal Dutch Football Association) LZV Kuypers H&W
8	DF	Aziz Sağlam	6 August 1982 (aged 29)			(Royal Belgian Football Association) Turcs Herstal
14	DF	Sami Büyüktopaç	22 June 1988 (aged 23)			(Turkish Football Federation) Trabzonspor
2	FW	Kahan Özcan	25 November 1991 (aged 20)			(Royal Belgian Football Association) Futsal Beringen
5	FW	Kenan Köseoğlu	17 May 1985 (aged 26)			(Royal Dutch Football Association) TPP Rotterdam
6	FW	İsmail Çelen	23 November 1985 (aged 26)			(Royal Dutch Football Association) Leonidas
7	FW	Cem Keskin	9 September 1988 (aged 23)			(Turkish Football Federation) Istanbul Kartal Belediyespor
9	FW	Burak Yıldırım	1 January 1982 (aged 30)			(Turkish Football Federation) Belediyesi Bodrumspor
10	FW	Cihan Özcan	27 June 1982 (aged 29)			(Royal Belgian Football Association) Futsal Beringen
11	FW	Yener Kılıç	4 January 1985 (aged 27)			(Royal Dutch Football Association) CFE/VDL Groep

== Group D ==
=== Portugal ===
Head coach: Jorge Braz

No.	Pos.	Player	Date of birth (age)	Caps	Goals	Club
1	GK	João Benedito	7 October 1978 (aged 33)			(Portuguese Football Federation) Sporting CP
12	GK	Bebé	19 May 1983 (aged 28)			(Portuguese Football Federation) SL Benfica
14	GK	André Sousa	25 February 1986 (aged 25)			(Portuguese Football Federation) Académica de Coimbra
7	DF	Cardinal	26 June 1985 (aged 26)			(Russian Football Union) CSKA Moskva
9	DF	Gonçalo Alves	1 July 1977 (aged 34)			(Portuguese Football Federation) SL Benfica
11	DF	João Matos	21 February 1987 (aged 24)			(Portuguese Football Federation) Sporting CP
6	MF	Arnaldo	16 June 1979 (aged 32)			(Latvian Football Federation) FK Nikars Riga
8	MF	Bruno Coelho	1 August 1987 (aged 24)			(Portuguese Football Federation) SL Benfica
13	MF	Marinho	30 March 1985 (aged 26)			(Portuguese Football Federation) SL Benfica
10	MF	Ricardinho	3 September 1985 (aged 26)			(Portuguese Football Federation) SL Benfica
2	MF	Paulinho	12 March 1983 (aged 28)			(Portuguese Football Federation) Sporting CP
4	MF	Pedro Cary	10 May 1984 (aged 27)			(Portuguese Football Federation) Sporting CP
3	FW	Ricardo Fernandes	20 February 1986 (aged 25)			(Portuguese Football Federation) AR Freixieiro
5	FW	Joel Queirós	21 May 1982 (aged 29)			(Portuguese Football Federation) SL Benfica

=== Serbia ===
Head coach: Aca Kovacevic

No.	Pos.	Player	Date of birth (age)	Caps	Goals	Club
1	GK	Miodrag Aksentijević	22 July 1983 (aged 28)			(Football Association of Serbia) KMF Ekonomac Kragujevac
12	GK	Nicola Josimović	16 March 1986 (aged 25)			(Football Association of Serbia) KMF Kolubara Lazarevac
7	DF	Slobodan Janjić	17 February 1987 (aged 24)			(Football Association of Serbia) KMF Ekonomac Kragujevac
14	DF	Slobodan Rajčević	28 February 1985 (aged 26)			(Football Association of Serbia) KMF Ekonomac Kragujevac
4	DF	Vladimir Milosavac	1 December 1985 (aged 26)			(Football Association of Serbia) KMF Marbo Intermezzo
3	DF	Aleksandar Živanović	24 July 1988 (aged 23)			(Football Association of Serbia) KMF Marbo Intermezzo
5	DF	Bojan Pavićević	20 October 1975 (aged 36)			(Football Association of Serbia) KMF Marbo Intermezzo
6	DF	Boris Čizmar	28 August 1984 (aged 27)			(Football Association of Serbia) KMF Kolubara Lazarevac
2	DF	Miloš Milačić	26 July 1980 (aged 31)			(Football Association of Serbia) Kopernikus Vidre Niš
11	MF	Jovan Djordjević	22 January 1985 (aged 26)			(Football Association of Serbia) KMF Marbo Intermezzo
8	FW	Marko Pršić	13 September 1990 (aged 21)			(Football Association of Serbia) KMF Marbo Intermezzo
9	FW	Vladimir Lazić	19 June 1986 (aged 27)			(Football Association of Serbia) KMF Ekonomac Kragujevac
10	FW	Mladen Kocić	22 October 1988 (aged 23)			(Football Association of Serbia) KMF Ekonomac Kragujevac
13	FW	Vidan Bojović	27 June 1979 (aged 32)			(Football Association of Serbia) KMF Ekonomac Kragujevac

=== Azerbaijan ===
Head coach: Alesio Da Silva

No.	Pos.	Player	Date of birth (age)	Caps	Goals	Club
1	GK	Andrey Tveryankin	6 March 1967 (aged 44)			(Russian Football Union) KPRF Moskva
12	GK	Marat Salyanski	29 May 1974 (aged 37)			(Association of Football Federations of Azerbaijan) Araz Naxçivan
4	DF	Serjão	18 September 1979 (aged 32)			(Ukrainian Association of Football) Uragan Ivano-Frankivsk
5	DF	Felipe	5 October 1978 (aged 33)			(Association of Football Federations of Azerbaijan) Araz Naxçivan
7	DF	Rajab Farajzade	19 December 1980 (aged 31)			(Association of Football Federations of Azerbaijan) Araz Naxçivan
8	DF	Rizvan Farzaliyev	1 September 1979 (aged 32)			(Association of Football Federations of Azerbaijan) Araz Naxçivan
11	DF	Namig Mammadkarimov	21 July 1980 (aged 31)			(Association of Football Federations of Azerbaijan) Araz Naxçivan
14	DF	Vitaliy Borisov	5 July 1982 (aged 29)			(Association of Football Federations of Azerbaijan) Araz Naxçivan
3	FW	Ilkin Hajiyev	8 January 1983 (aged 29)			(Association of Football Federations of Azerbaijan) Neftchi Baku
6	FW	Alves	26 June 1984 (aged 27)			(Association of Football Federations of Azerbaijan) Araz Naxçivan
9	FW	Thiago	26 August 1981 (aged 30)			(Association of Football Federations of Azerbaijan) Araz Naxçivan
15	FW	Rufat Balakishiyev	28 December 1983 (aged 28)			(Association of Football Federations of Azerbaijan) Neftchi Baku
18	FW	Jadder Dantas	6 December 1982 (aged 29)			(Association of Football Federations of Azerbaijan) Araz Naxçivan
