= 2016 FIFA Futsal World Cup squads =

This article lists the national futsal squads for the 2016 FIFA Futsal World Cup tournament held in Colombia, between 10 September to 1 October 2016.

== Group A ==
=== Colombia ===
Head coach: (Colombia) Arney Fonnegra

No.	Pos.	Player	Date of birth (age)	Caps	Club
1	GK	Carlos Ñañez	15 December 1984 (aged 31)		(Colombia) Deportivo Lyon
2	DF	Javier Ortíz	9 January 1989 (aged 27)		(Colombia) Real Antioquia
3	DF	Gildardo Zúñiga	27 September 1992 (aged 23)		(Colombia) Tolima Syscafé
4	DF	Yeisson Fonnegra	19 April 1992 (aged 24)		(Colombia) Talento Dorado
5	DF	Yefri Duque	24 March 1992 (aged 24)		(Colombia) Deportivo Meta
6	MF	Miguel Sierra	13 April 1983 (aged 33)		(Venezuela) Caracas
7	MF	Jhonatan Toro	21 March 1988 (aged 28)		(Colombia) Real Bucaramanga
8	MF	Jorge Abril	26 July 1987 (aged 29)		(Colombia) Real Bucaramanga
9	FW	Yulián Díaz	9 March 1995 (aged 21)		(Portugal) Fundão
10	MF	Angellot Caro	3 December 1988 (aged 27)		(Colombia) Real Bucaramanga
11	FW	Daniel Bolívar	2 November 1987 (aged 28)		(Colombia) Real Antioquia
12	GK	César Mejía	26 September 1989 (aged 26)		(Colombia) Real Antioquia
13	MF	Christian Otero	30 July 1991 (aged 25)		(Colombia) Deportivo Lyon
14	DF	Andrés Reyes	24 November 1988 (aged 27)		(Colombia) Saeta

=== Portugal ===
Head coach: (Portugal) Jorge Braz

No.	Pos.	Player	Date of birth (age)	Caps	Club
1	GK	Bebé	19 May 1983 (aged 33)		(Portugal) Benfica
2	MF	André Coelho	30 October 1993 (aged 22)		(Portugal) Braga
3	MF	Bruno Coelho	1 August 1987 (aged 29)		(Portugal) Benfica
4	MF	Miguel Ângelo	2 February 1994 (aged 22)		(Portugal) Benfica
5	DF	Fábio Cecílio	30 April 1993 (aged 23)		(Portugal) Benfica
6	DF	Pedro Cary	10 May 1984 (aged 32)		(Portugal) Sporting
7	FW	Fernando Cardinal	26 June 1985 (aged 31)		(Spain) ElPozo Murcia
8	DF	Djô	11 January 1986 (aged 30)		(Portugal) Sporting
9	FW	João Matos	21 February 1987 (aged 29)		(Portugal) Sporting
10	MF	Ricardinho	3 September 1985 (aged 31)		(Spain) Inter Movistar
11	MF	Ré	4 October 1985 (aged 30)		(Portugal) Benfica
12	GK	Vítor Hugo	30 November 1982 (aged 33)		(Portugal) Braga
13	MF	Tiago Brito	22 July 1991 (aged 25)		(Portugal) Braga
14	GK	Cristiano Parreiro	20 August 1979 (aged 37)		(Portugal) Azeméis

=== Uzbekistan ===
Head coach: (Spain) Pulpis

No.	Pos.	Player	Date of birth (age)	Caps	Club
1	GK	Rustam Umarov	26 May 1984 (aged 32)		(Uzbekistan) Almalyk
2	DF	Dilshod Irsaliev	31 December 1983 (aged 32)		(Uzbekistan) Ardus
3	DF	Nodir Elibaev	2 October 1982 (aged 33)		(Uzbekistan) Ardus
4	DF	Shukhrat Tojiboev	18 February 1981 (aged 35)		(Uzbekistan) Almalyk
5	MF	Davron Choriev	1 January 1993 (aged 23)		(Uzbekistan) Ardus
6	MF	Mashrab Adilov	15 August 1994 (aged 22)		(Uzbekistan) Bunyodkor
7	MF	Dilshod Rakhmatov	4 December 1989 (aged 26)		(Uzbekistan) Ardus
8	MF	Farkhod Abdumavlyanov	12 November 1987 (aged 28)		(Uzbekistan) Ardus
9	FW	Ilhomjon Hamroev	25 September 1997 (aged 18)		(Uzbekistan) Ardus
10	FW	Javlon Anorov	8 May 1984 (aged 32)		(Uzbekistan) Almalyk
11	FW	Artur Yunusov	8 October 1987 (aged 28)		(Uzbekistan) Ardus
12	GK	Akmaljon Khazratkulov	31 March 1990 (aged 26)		(Uzbekistan) Dustlik-AIN
13	MF	Feruz Fakhriddinov	25 March 1991 (aged 25)		(Uzbekistan) Dustlik-AIN
14	DF	Konstantin Sviridov	11 March 1988 (aged 28)		(Uzbekistan) Almalyk

=== Panama ===
Head coach: (Cuba) Agustín Campuzano

No.	Pos.	Player	Date of birth (age)	Caps	Club
1	GK	Daniel Atencio	14 November 1984 (aged 31)		(Panama) Perejil
2	DF	Josué Brown	11 October 1987 (aged 28)		Unattached
3	DF	Óscar Hinks	20 September 1985 (aged 30)		(Panama) San Miguelito
4	DF	Jorge Pérez	26 June 1988 (aged 28)		(Panama) Perejil
5	MF	Fernando Mena	8 August 1990 (aged 26)		(Panama) Santa Gema
6	MF	Édgar Rivas	21 April 1989 (aged 27)		(Panama) Perejil
7	MF	Claudio Goodridge	2 January 1990 (aged 26)		(Panama) San Martín
8	FW	Carlos Pérez	29 August 1986 (aged 30)		(Panama) Perejil
9	FW	Ángel Sánchez	4 July 1994 (aged 22)		(Panama) Costa del Este
10	MF	Michael De León	1 March 1989 (aged 27)		(Panama) Santa Gema
11	FW	Abdiel Castrellón	19 July 1991 (aged 25)		Unattached
12	GK	Jaime Londoño	18 January 1991 (aged 25)		(Panama) San Miguelito
13	GK	José Victoria	14 September 1980 (aged 35)		Unattached
14	FW	Ariel Castillo	13 November 1989 (aged 26)		Unattached

== Group B ==
=== Thailand ===
Head coach: (Spain) Miguel Rodrigo

No.	Pos.	Player	Date of birth (age)	Caps	Club
1	GK	Kanison Phoopan	11 November 1991 (aged 24)		(Thailand) Port
2	GK	Chaleamsri Puangsri	18 April 1989 (aged 27)		(Thailand) Surat Thani
3	DF	Natthapon Suttiroj	27 January 1983 (aged 33)		(Thailand) Chonburi Blue Wave
4	DF	Pornmongkol Srisubseang	15 May 1991 (aged 25)		(Thailand) Port
5	DF	Lertchai Issarasuwipakorn	2 November 1982 (aged 33)		(Thailand) Chonburi Blue Wave
6	DF	Jirawat Sornwichian	25 October 1988 (aged 27)		(Thailand) Chonburi Blue Wave
7	MF	Kritsada Wongkaeo	29 April 1988 (aged 28)		(Thailand) Chonburi Blue Wave
8	FW	Jetsada Chudech	20 February 1989 (aged 27)		(Thailand) Rajnavy
9	FW	Suphawut Thueanklang	14 July 1989 (aged 27)		(Thailand) Chonburi Blue Wave
10	MF	Nattawut Madyalan	12 April 1990 (aged 26)		(Thailand) Chonburi Blue Wave
11	MF	Apiwat Chaemcharoen	31 March 1991 (aged 25)		(Thailand) Chonburi Blue Wave
12	GK	Katawut Hankampa	27 May 1992 (aged 24)		(Thailand) Chonburi Blue Wave
13	MF	Tairong Petchtiam	1 July 1993 (aged 23)		(Thailand) Bangkok City
14	MF	Wiwat Thaijaroen	31 December 1990 (aged 25)		(Thailand) Highways Department

=== Russia ===
Head coach: (Russia) Sergey Skorovich

No.	Pos.	Player	Date of birth (age)	Caps	Club
1	GK	Georgi Zamtaradze	12 February 1987 (aged 29)		(Russia) Dinamo Moskva
2	DF	Vladislav Shayakhmetov	25 August 1981 (aged 35)		(Russia) Gazprom-Ugra Yugorsk
3	GK	Sergei Vikulov	25 March 1990 (aged 26)		(Russia) Sinara Yekaterinburg
4	FW	Dmitri Lyskov	24 September 1987 (aged 28)		(Russia) Gazprom-Ugra Yugorsk
5	DF	Rômulo	28 September 1986 (aged 29)		(Spain) Barcelona
6	DF	Ivan Chishkala	11 July 1995 (aged 21)		(Russia) Gazprom-Ugra Yugorsk
7	FW	Ivan Milovanov	8 February 1989 (aged 27)		(Russia) Tyumen
8	FW	Eder Lima	29 June 1984 (aged 32)		(Russia) Gazprom-Ugra Yugorsk
9	FW	Sergei Abramov	9 September 1990 (aged 26)		(Russia) Dina Moskva
10	FW	Robinho	28 January 1983 (aged 33)		(Russia) Dinamo Moskva
11	FW	Artem Niyazov	30 July 1996 (aged 20)		(Russia) Dina Moskva
12	GK	Gustavo	5 February 1979 (aged 37)		(Russia) Dinamo Moskva
13	DF	Sergei Abramovich	15 January 1990 (aged 26)		(Russia) Tyumen
14	DF	Daniil Davydov	23 January 1989 (aged 27)		(Russia) Gazprom-Ugra Yugorsk

=== Cuba ===
Head coach: (Cuba) Clemente Reinoso

No.	Pos.	Player	Date of birth (age)	Caps	Club
1	GK	Nelson Johnston	25 February 1990 (aged 26)		Santiago de Cuba
2	DF	Alejandro Marrero	27 February 1990 (aged 26)		(Cuba) Granma
3	DF	Daniel Hernández	11 June 1986 (aged 30)		(Cuba) Cienfuegos
4	DF	Reinier Socarras	26 March 1991 (aged 25)		(Cuba) Ciudad de La Habana
5	DF	Ronald Egozcue	18 March 1980 (aged 36)		(Cuba) Ciudad de La Habana
6	MF	Karel Marino	22 February 1985 (aged 31)		(Cuba) Holguín
7	MF	Luis Portal	19 January 1992 (aged 24)		(Cuba) Ciudad de La Habana
8	MF	Andy Baquero	17 August 1994 (aged 22)		(Cuba) Ciudad de La Habana
9	FW	Sandy Domínguez	16 June 1987 (aged 29)		(Cuba) Ciudad de La Habana
10	FW	Jhonnet Martínez	3 July 1982 (aged 34)		(Cuba) Ciudad de La Habana
11	FW	Reynier Fiallo	19 July 1987 (aged 29)		(Cuba) Ciudad de La Habana
12	GK	Brenieht Suárez	17 July 1984 (aged 32)		(Cuba) Ciudad de La Habana
13	MF	Diego Ramírez	3 November 1998 (aged 17)		(Cuba) Ciudad de La Habana
14	MF	Ricardo Castillo	6 August 1987 (aged 29)		(Cuba) Granma

=== Egypt ===
Head coach: (Egypt) Hesham Saleh

No.	Pos.	Player	Date of birth (age)	Caps	Club
1	GK	Gamal Abdelnaser	20 January 1993 (aged 23)		(Egypt) El-Alamein
2	GK	Mohamed Abdellatif	5 February 1995 (aged 21)		(Egypt) Misr Lel-Makkasa
3	FW	Abdelrahman El-Ashwal	25 December 1993 (aged 22)		(Egypt) Misr Lel-Makkasa
4	FW	Ahmed Homos	2 May 1993 (aged 23)		(Egypt) Misr Lel-Makkasa
5	DF	Essam Alla	1 September 1994 (aged 22)		(Egypt) El-Bank El-Ahly
6	DF	Mostafa Nader	14 October 1984 (aged 31)		(Egypt) Zamalek
7	DF	Ibrahim Eika	17 October 1987 (aged 28)		(Egypt) Misr Lel-Makkasa
8	DF	Mizo	15 October 1985 (aged 30)		(Egypt) Misr Lel-Makkasa
9	DF	Mohamed Mido	30 September 1984 (aged 31)		(Egypt) El-Shams
10	FW	Ahmed Moza	18 October 1988 (aged 27)		(Egypt) Misr Lel-Makkasa
11	DF	Said Bedir	31 July 1991 (aged 25)		(Egypt) El-Olympi
12	FW	Mostafa Eid	17 August 1992 (aged 24)		(Egypt) Misr Lel-Makkasa
13	FW	Salah Hosny	6 August 1990 (aged 26)		(Egypt) El-Shorta
14	FW	Saber Sayed	2 April 1989 (aged 27)		(Egypt) Misr Lel-Makkasa

== Group C ==
=== Paraguay ===
Head coach: (Paraguay) Carlos Chilavert

No.	Pos.	Player	Date of birth (age)	Caps	Club
1	GK	Carlos Espínola	6 April 1981 (aged 35)		(Paraguay) Afemec
2	FW	Enmanuel Ayala	3 December 1985 (aged 30)		(Paraguay) Cerro Porteño
3	MF	Juan Pedrozo	30 March 1992 (aged 24)		(Paraguay) Afemec
4	DF	Gabriel Ayala	3 December 1985 (aged 30)		(Paraguay) Cerro Porteño
5	DF	José Luis Santander	10 April 1981 (aged 35)		(Paraguay) Afemec
6	FW	Richard Rejala	5 February 1994 (aged 22)		(Paraguay) Cerro Porteño
7	MF	Adolfo Salas	22 September 1993 (aged 22)		(Italy) Pescara
8	MF	Juan Morel	19 February 1994 (aged 22)		(Paraguay) Cerro Porteño
9	MF	Hugo Martínez	12 January 1993 (aged 23)		(Paraguay) Cerro Porteño
10	FW	Juan Salas	20 October 1990 (aged 25)		(Italy) Lazio
11	FW	Francisco Martínez	12 January 1993 (aged 23)		(Paraguay) Cerro Porteño
12	GK	Gabriel Giménez	29 May 1984 (aged 32)		(Paraguay) Cerro Porteño
13	FW	Enrique Franco	8 June 1996 (aged 20)		(Paraguay) Afemec
14	MF	René Villalba	8 July 1981 (aged 35)		(Paraguay) Cerro Porteño

=== Italy ===
Head coach: (Italy) Roberto Menichelli

No.	Pos.	Player	Date of birth (age)	Caps	Club
1	GK	Stefano Mammarella	2 February 1984 (aged 32)		(Italy) Acqua e Sapone
2	DF	Marco Ercolessi	15 May 1986 (aged 30)		(Italy) Pescara
3	MF	Gabriel Lima	19 August 1987 (aged 29)		(Spain) ElPozo Murcia
4	MF	Sergio Romano	28 September 1987 (aged 28)		(Italy) Acqua e Sapone
5	DF	Luca Leggiero	11 November 1984 (aged 31)		(Italy) Pescara
6	MF	Humberto Honorio	21 July 1983 (aged 33)		(Italy) Luparense
7	MF	Paolo Cesaroni	10 April 1991 (aged 25)		(Italy) Asti
8	FW	Carlos Kaká	27 May 1987 (aged 29)		(Italy) Kaos
9	FW	Rodolfo Fortino	30 April 1983 (aged 33)		(Portugal) Sporting
10	MF	Alex Merlim	15 July 1986 (aged 30)		(Portugal) Sporting
11	MF	Murilo Ferreira	10 March 1989 (aged 27)		(Italy) Acqua e Sapone
12	GK	Michele Miarelli	29 April 1984 (aged 32)		(Italy) Luparense
13	DF	Daniel Giasson	24 August 1987 (aged 29)		(Italy) Lazio
14	GK	Francesco Molitierno	14 October 1989 (aged 26)		(Italy) Carlisport Cogianco

=== Vietnam ===
Head coach: (Spain) Bruno García Formoso

No.	Pos.	Player	Date of birth (age)	Caps	Club
1	GK	Ngô Đình Thuận	5 July 1987 (aged 29)		(Vietnam) Thái Sơn Nam
2	GK	Nguyễn Văn Huy	13 August 1989 (aged 27)		(Vietnam) Thái Sơn Bắc
3	MF	Lê Quốc Nam	14 November 1993 (aged 22)		(Vietnam) Thái Sơn Nam
4	MF	Vũ Xuân Du	12 November 1991 (aged 24)		(Vietnam) Thái Sơn Nam
5	MF	Ngô Ngọc Sơn	24 March 1995 (aged 21)		(Vietnam) Thái Sơn Nam
6	DF	Trần Long Vũ	25 August 1988 (aged 28)		(Vietnam) Thái Sơn Nam
7	FW	Phùng Trọng Luân	20 October 1985 (aged 30)		(Vietnam) Thái Sơn Nam
8	FW	Nguyễn Minh Trí	8 April 1996 (aged 20)		(Vietnam) Thái Sơn Nam
9	MF	Trần Thái Huy	12 October 1995 (aged 20)		(Vietnam) Thái Sơn Nam
10	MF	Nguyễn Bảo Quân (Captain)	19 August 1983 (aged 33)		(Vietnam) Thái Sơn Nam
11	DF	Trần Văn Vũ	30 May 1990 (aged 26)		(Vietnam) Thái Sơn Nam
12	MF	Phạm Đức Hòa	12 April 1991 (aged 25)		(Vietnam) Hải Phương Nam
13	DF	Danh Phát	24 February 1993 (aged 23)		(Vietnam) Thái Sơn Nam
14	DF	Mai Thành Đạt	5 April 1987 (aged 29)		(Vietnam) Sanna Khánh Hòa

=== Guatemala ===
Head coach: (Spain) Tomás De Dios

No.	Pos.	Player	Date of birth (age)	Caps	Club
1	GK	Carlos Mérida	27 March 1978 (aged 38)		(Guatemala) Farmacéuticos
2	DF	Román Alvarado	2 December 1997 (aged 18)		(Guatemala) Kinesiotape
3	FW	Wanderley Ruíz	9 August 1995 (aged 21)		(Guatemala) Legendarios
4	DF	José González	10 December 1986 (aged 29)		(Guatemala) Glucosoral
5	MF	Édgar Santizo	2 February 1987 (aged 29)		(Guatemala) Glucosoral
6	MF	Dean Humes	12 August 1991 (aged 25)		(Guatemala) Farmacéuticos
7	FW	José Mansilla	19 November 1988 (aged 27)		(Guatemala) Glucosoral
8	FW	Patrick Ruíz	10 January 1993 (aged 23)		(Guatemala) Legendarios
9	FW	Walter Enríquez	13 March 1988 (aged 28)		(Guatemala) Farmacéuticos
10	FW	Marvin Sandoval	22 March 1989 (aged 27)		(Guatemala) Glucosoral
11	MF	Alan Aguilar	2 December 1989 (aged 26)		(Guatemala) Glucosoral
12	GK	William Ramírez	2 February 1980 (aged 36)		(Guatemala) Glucosoral
13	DF	Miguel Santizo	17 May 1985 (aged 31)		(Guatemala) Glucosoral
14	MF	Jonatan Arévalo	24 February 1993 (aged 23)		(Guatemala) Legendarios

== Group D ==
=== Ukraine ===
Head coach: (Ukraine) Oleksandr Kosenko

No.	Pos.	Player	Date of birth (age)	Caps	Club
1	GK	Yevhen Ivanyak	28 September 1982 (aged 33)		(Russia) Dina Moskva
2	DF	Mykola Grytsyna	3 June 1989 (aged 27)		(Ukraine) Energia Lviv
3	DF	Ihor Borsuk	6 April 1983 (aged 33)		(Ukraine) HIT Kyiv
4	FW	Petro Shoturma	27 June 1992 (aged 24)		(Ukraine) Uragan Ivano-Frankivsk
5	DF	Mykola Bilotserkivets	5 December 1986 (aged 29)		(Ukraine) Lokomotiv Kharkiv
6	DF	Yevgen Valenko	1 November 1984 (aged 31)		(Serbia) Ekonomac
7	FW	Serhiy Zhurba	14 March 1987 (aged 29)		(Ukraine) Lokomotiv Kharkiv
8	DF	Sergiy Koval	23 August 1986 (aged 30)		(Ukraine) Uragan Ivano-Frankivsk
9	DF	Mykhailo Grytsyna	19 October 1991 (aged 24)		(Ukraine) Energia Lviv
10	FW	Dmytro Sorokin	14 July 1988 (aged 28)		(Ukraine) Lokomotiv Kharkiv
11	FW	Denys Ovsyannikov	10 December 1984 (aged 31)		(Ukraine) Lokomotiv Kharkiv
12	GK	Dmytro Lytvynenko	16 April 1987 (aged 29)		(Ukraine) Lokomotiv Kharkiv
13	FW	Oleksandr Sorokin	13 August 1987 (aged 29)		(Ukraine) Lokomotiv Kharkiv
14	DF	Dmytro Bondar	12 October 1983 (aged 32)		(Ukraine) Lokomotiv Kharkiv

=== Brazil ===
Head coach: (Brazil) Sérgio

No.	Pos.	Player	Date of birth (age)	Caps	Club
1	GK	Guitta	11 June 1987 (aged 29)		(Brazil) Corinthians
2	GK	Tiago	9 March 1981 (aged 35)		(Brazil) Sorocaba
3	GK	Gian Wolverine	14 February 1985 (aged 31)		(Brazil) Intelli
4	DF	Ari	6 March 1982 (aged 34)		(Russia) Dinamo Moskva
5	MF	Dyego	5 August 1989 (aged 27)		(Spain) Barcelona
6	MF	Jackson Samurai	26 September 1989 (aged 26)		(Brazil) Intelli
7	DF	Rafael Rato	16 June 1983 (aged 33)		(Spain) Inter Movistar
8	MF	Xuxa	16 April 1986 (aged 30)		(Brazil) Joinville
9	FW	Jé	5 November 1983 (aged 32)		(Kazakhstan) Kairat Almaty
10	FW	Fernandinho	1 July 1983 (aged 33)		(Russia) Dinamo Moskva
11	MF	Bateria	16 December 1990 (aged 25)		(Spain) Barcelona
12	MF	Falcão	8 June 1977 (aged 39)		(Brazil) Sorocaba
13	FW	Dieguinho	22 June 1989 (aged 27)		(Portugal) Sporting
14	DF	Rodrigo	7 June 1984 (aged 32)		(Brazil) Sorocaba

=== Mozambique ===
Head coach: (Mozambique) Naymo Abdul

No.	Pos.	Player	Date of birth (age)	Caps	Club
1	GK	Calton	31 December 1990 (aged 25)		(Mozambique) Liga Chimoio
2	DF	Calo	14 November 1993 (aged 22)		(Mozambique) GDI Maputo
3	DF	Carlão	21 November 1984 (aged 31)		(Mozambique) Petromoc Maputo
4	DF	Edson Lamarques	4 July 1990 (aged 26)		(Mozambique) Liga Chimoio
5	DF	Favito	14 January 1987 (aged 29)		(Mozambique) Petromoc Maputo
6	MF	Manucho	19 March 1984 (aged 32)		(Mozambique) GDI Maputo
7	FW	Mário	25 February 1994 (aged 22)		(Mozambique) LD Maputo
8	MF	Edson Ferreira	1 June 1989 (aged 27)		(Mozambique) Petromoc Maputo
9	FW	Magu	25 April 1995 (aged 21)		(Mozambique) GDI Maputo
10	MF	Zira	9 August 1993 (aged 23)		(Mozambique) Petromoc Maputo
11	FW	Dany	17 May 1996 (aged 20)		(Mozambique) Estrela Vermelha Maputo
12	GK	Nelson	14 April 1985 (aged 31)		(Mozambique) GDI Maputo
13	FW	Dino	1 October 1980 (aged 35)		(Mozambique) GDI Maputo
14	FW	Ricardinho	15 October 1993 (aged 22)		(Portugal) Belenenses

=== Australia ===
Head coach: (Australia) Robert Varela

No.	Pos.	Player	Date of birth (age)	Caps	Club
1	GK	Angelo Konstantinou	8 November 1978 (aged 37)		(Australia) Inner West Magic
2	DF	Adam Cooper	18 April 1992 (aged 24)		(Australia) Vic Vipers
3	MF	Jarrod Basger	9 February 1991 (aged 25)		(England) Baku United
4	DF	Greg Giovenali	14 August 1987 (aged 29)		(Australia) Dural Warriors
5	FW	Blake Rosier	8 January 1992 (aged 24)		(Australia) Dural Warriors
6	FW	Wade Giovenali	15 August 1994 (aged 22)		(Australia) Dural Warriors
7	DF	Tobias Seeto	26 March 1988 (aged 28)		(England) Baku United
8	MF	Jonathan Barrientos	2 April 1988 (aged 28)		(Australia) Vic Vipers
9	DF	Chris Zeballos	16 June 1986 (aged 30)		(Australia) East Coast Heat
10	MF	Daniel Fogarty	10 January 1991 (aged 25)		(Australia) Inner West Magic
11	MF	Dean Lockhart	30 April 1987 (aged 29)		(Australia) Inner West Magic
12	GK	Roberto Maiorana	6 December 1989 (aged 26)		(Australia) Inner West Magic
13	FW	Shervin Keshavarz Adeli	4 May 1992 (aged 24)		(Australia) East Coast Heat
14	GK	Peter Spathis	9 April 1981 (aged 35)		(Australia) East Coast Heat

== Group E ==
=== Argentina ===
Head coach: (Argentina) Diego Giustozzi

No.	Pos.	Player	Date of birth (age)	Caps	Club
1	GK	Nicolás Sarmiento	3 December 1992 (aged 23)		(Spain) Palma
2	DF	Damián Stazzone	31 January 1986 (aged 30)		(Argentina) San Lorenzo
3	MF	Alamiro Vaporaki	1 December 1983 (aged 32)		(Argentina) Boca Juniors
4	DF	Gerardo Battistoni	21 April 1983 (aged 33)		(Italy) Latina
5	FW	Maximiliano Rescia	29 October 1987 (aged 28)		(Italy) Sangiorgese
6	FW	Fernando Wilhelm	5 April 1982 (aged 34)		(Portugal) Benfica
7	FW	Leandro Cuzzolino	21 May 1987 (aged 29)		(Italy) Montesilvano
8	MF	Santiago Basile	25 July 1988 (aged 28)		(Argentina) Kimberley
9	FW	Cristian Borruto	7 May 1987 (aged 29)		(Italy) Montesilvano
10	MF	Constantino Vaporaki	6 January 1990 (aged 26)		(Argentina) Boca Juniors
11	FW	Alan Brandi	24 November 1987 (aged 28)		(Italy) Acqua e Sapone
12	GK	Matías Quevedo	11 March 1984 (aged 32)		(Argentina) Ferro
13	GK	Guido Mosenson	7 March 1989 (aged 27)		(Argentina) Hebraica
14	MF	Pablo Taborda	3 September 1986 (aged 30)		(Italy) Luparense

=== Kazakhstan ===
Head coach: (Brazil) Ricardo Sobral

No.	Pos.	Player	Date of birth (age)	Caps	Club
1	GK	Alexandr Gurov	2 August 1994 (aged 22)		(Kazakhstan) Kairat Almaty
2	GK	Leo Higuita	6 June 1986 (aged 30)		(Kazakhstan) Kairat Almaty
3	MF	Arnold Knaub	16 January 1995 (aged 21)		(Kazakhstan) Astana-Tulpar Karagandy
4	DF	Dauren Nurgozhin	21 May 1990 (aged 26)		(Kazakhstan) Kairat Almaty
5	FW	Alexandr Grebonos	9 October 1987 (aged 28)		(Kazakhstan) Astana-Tulpar Karagandy
6	DF	Leo Jaraguá	21 May 1987 (aged 29)		(Portugal) Sporting
7	FW	Nikolay Pengrin	7 August 1984 (aged 32)		(Kazakhstan) Astana-Tulpar Karagandy
8	DF	Dinmukhambet Suleimenov	25 August 1981 (aged 35)		(Kazakhstan) Kairat Almaty
9	FW	Alexandr Dovgan	9 February 1988 (aged 28)		(Kazakhstan) Astana-Tulpar Karagandy
10	MF	Chingiz Yesenamanov	10 March 1989 (aged 27)		(Kazakhstan) Kairat Almaty
11	DF	Mikhail Pershin	19 October 1989 (aged 26)		(Kazakhstan) Kairat Almaty
12	FW	Pavel Taku	30 August 1988 (aged 28)		(Kazakhstan) Astana-Tulpar Karagandy
13	DF	Ilya Mun	2 August 1993 (aged 23)		(Kazakhstan) Astana-Tulpar Karagandy
14	FW	Douglas Júnior	15 October 1988 (aged 27)		(Kazakhstan) Kairat Almaty

=== Solomon Islands ===
Head coach: (Brazil) Juliano Schmeling

No.	Pos.	Player	Date of birth (age)	Caps	Club
1	GK	Philip Mango	28 August 1995 (aged 21)		(Solomon Islands) Marist Fire
2	GK	Paul Huia	1 March 1983 (aged 33)		(Solomon Islands) Marist Fire
3	DF	Elliot Ragomo	28 May 1990 (aged 26)		(Solomon Islands) Marist Fire
4	DF	George Stevenson	7 January 1992 (aged 24)		(Solomon Islands) Marist Fire
5	MF	Francis Lafai	21 October 1990 (aged 25)		(Solomon Islands) Marist Fire
6	MF	Robert Laua	8 September 1991 (aged 25)		(Solomon Islands) Marist Fire
7	MF	James Egeta	10 August 1990 (aged 26)		(Australia) South Brisbane
8	MF	Jeffery Bule	15 November 1991 (aged 24)		(Solomon Islands) Marist Fire
9	FW	Micah Lea'alafa	1 June 1991 (aged 25)		(New Zealand) Auckland City
10	MF	Samuel Osifelo	15 March 1991 (aged 25)		(Solomon Islands) Kossa
11	MF	Coleman Makau	25 November 1992 (aged 23)		(Solomon Islands) Kossa
12	MF	Jack Wetney	4 March 1990 (aged 26)		(Solomon Islands) Solomon Warriors
13	FW	Mathias Saru	5 February 1991 (aged 25)		(Solomon Islands) Marist Fire
14	DF	Alvin Hou	18 September 1996 (aged 19)		(Solomon Islands) Marist Fire

=== Costa Rica ===
Head coach: (Costa Rica) Diego Solís

No.	Pos.	Player	Date of birth (age)	Caps	Club
1	GK	Álvaro Santamaría	1 April 1988 (aged 28)		(Costa Rica) Grupo Line
2	FW	Gilberth Garro	26 November 1990 (aged 25)		(Costa Rica) Borussia
3	FW	Carlos Chavés	3 January 1980 (aged 36)		(Costa Rica) Barrio Peralta
4	MF	Isaías Mora	27 November 1989 (aged 26)		(Costa Rica) Hatillo
5	DF	Adonay Vindas	25 October 1985 (aged 30)		(Costa Rica) Borussia
6	DF	Víctor Fonseca	16 November 1992 (aged 23)		(Costa Rica) Goicoechea
7	FW	Alejandro Paniagua	20 May 1986 (aged 30)		(Costa Rica) Barrio Peralta
8	MF	Juan Cordero	29 May 1988 (aged 28)		(Costa Rica) Borussia
9	MF	Marco Carvajal	2 December 1981 (aged 34)		(Costa Rica) Goicoechea
10	DF	Edwin Cubillo	23 August 1987 (aged 29)		(Costa Rica) Borussia
11	MF	Yariel Sandi	23 October 1992 (aged 23)		(Costa Rica) Grupo Line
12	MF	Diego Zúñiga	11 July 1990 (aged 26)		(Costa Rica) Grupo Line
13	MF	Erick Brenes	16 December 1989 (aged 26)		(Costa Rica) Paraíso
14	GK	Jairo Toruno	22 November 1983 (aged 32)		(Costa Rica) T-Shirt Mundo

== Group F ==
=== Iran ===
Head coach: (Iran) Mohammad Nazemalsharieh

No.	Pos.	Player	Date of birth (age)	Caps	Club
1	GK	Sepehr Mohammadi	8 August 1989 (aged 27)		(Iran) Giti Pasand Isfahan
2	GK	Alireza Samimi	29 June 1987 (aged 29)		(Iran) Mes Sungun
3	MF	Ahmad Esmaeilpour	8 September 1988 (aged 28)		(Iran) Giti Pasand Isfahan
4	DF	Mohammad Keshavarz	5 July 1982 (aged 34)		(Iran) Giti Pasand Isfahan
5	DF	Hamid Ahmadi	24 November 1988 (aged 27)		(Iran) Dabiri Tabriz
6	DF	Mohammad Reza Sangsefidi	2 November 1989 (aged 26)		(Iran) Tasisat Daryaei
7	MF	Ali Asghar Hassanzadeh	2 November 1987 (aged 28)		(Iran) Giti Pasand Isfahan
8	MF	Ghodrat Bahadori	4 February 1990 (aged 26)		(Iran) Farsh Ara Mashhad
9	FW	Afshin Kazemi	23 November 1986 (aged 29)		(Iran) Giti Pasand Isfahan
10	MF	Mohammad Taheri	2 May 1985 (aged 31)		(Iran) Shahrvand Sari
11	MF	Mehran Alighadr	24 May 1989 (aged 27)		(Iran) Giti Pasand Isfahan
12	FW	Hossein Tayyebi	29 September 1988 (aged 27)		(Iran) Tasisat Daryaei
13	FW	Farhad Tavakoli	14 January 1989 (aged 27)		(Iran) Sherkat Melli Haffari
14	FW	Mahdi Javid	3 May 1987 (aged 29)		(Iran) Giti Pasand Isfahan

=== Spain ===
Head coach: (Spain) Venancio López

No.	Pos.	Player	Date of birth (age)	Caps	Club
1	GK	Paco Sedano	2 December 1979 (aged 36)		(Spain) Barcelona
2	DF	Carlos Ortíz	3 October 1983 (aged 32)		(Spain) Inter Movistar
3	DF	José Ruiz	6 June 1983 (aged 33)		(Italy) Acqua e Sapone
4	DF	Bebe	28 May 1990 (aged 26)		(Spain) ElPozo Murcia
5	DF	Aicardo	4 December 1988 (aged 27)		(Spain) Barcelona
6	FW	Fernandão	16 August 1980 (aged 36)		(Italy) Kaos
7	MF	Pola	26 June 1988 (aged 28)		(Spain) Inter Movistar
8	MF	Mario Rivillos	13 December 1989 (aged 26)		(Spain) Inter Movistar
9	MF	Sergio Lozano	9 November 1988 (aged 27)		(Spain) Barcelona
10	FW	Álex Yepes	12 March 1989 (aged 27)		(Spain) ElPozo Murcia
11	MF	Miguelín	9 May 1985 (aged 31)		(Spain) ElPozo Murcia
12	GK	Juanjo	19 August 1985 (aged 31)		(Spain) Barcelona
13	GK	Jesús Herrero	4 November 1986 (aged 29)		(Spain) Inter Movistar
14	MF	Raúl Campos	17 December 1987 (aged 28)		(Spain) ElPozo Murcia

=== Morocco ===
Head coach: (Morocco) Hicham Dguig

No.	Pos.	Player	Date of birth (age)	Caps	Club
1	GK	Rabie Zaari	26 July 1981 (aged 35)		(Morocco) Raja Casablanca
2	FW	Achraf Saoud	21 June 1990 (aged 26)		(Morocco) Agadir
3	DF	Mohamed Jouad	4 March 1993 (aged 23)		(Morocco) Feth Settat
4	MF	Khalid Kouri	20 November 1993 (aged 22)		(Morocco) La Ville Haute Kénitra
5	FW	Youssef El Mazray	1 July 1987 (aged 29)		(Morocco) Feth Settat
6	MF	Soufiane Borite	11 December 1992 (aged 23)		(Morocco) La Ville Haute Kénitra
7	MF	Youness El Asas	11 March 1988 (aged 28)		(Morocco) Ajax Kénitra
8	FW	Adil Habil	27 May 1982 (aged 34)		(Morocco) Raja Casablanca
9	MF	Zakaria Kauiri	17 August 1987 (aged 29)		(Morocco) Raja Casablanca
10	FW	Soufiane El Mesrar	5 June 1990 (aged 26)		(Morocco) Dynamo Kénitra
11	FW	Bilal Bakkali	24 February 1993 (aged 23)		(Morocco) Dynamo Kénitra
12	GK	Reda Khiyari	21 May 1991 (aged 25)		(Morocco) Sebou
13	FW	Sulayman Amghar	27 November 1992 (aged 23)		(Italy) Kaos
14	DF	Abdelatif Fati	25 December 1990 (aged 25)		(Morocco) Feth Settat

=== Azerbaijan ===
Head coach: (Brazil) Miltinho

No.	Pos.	Player	Date of birth (age)	Caps	Club
1	GK	Emin Kurdov	10 July 1984 (aged 32)		(Azerbaijan) EKOL Baku
2	GK	Elnur Zamanov	17 May 1981 (aged 35)		(Azerbaijan) Neftchi Baku
3	FW	Bolinha	19 February 1987 (aged 29)		(Azerbaijan) Araz Naxçivan
4	FW	Isa Atayev	7 August 1989 (aged 27)		(Azerbaijan) Araz Naxçivan
5	FW	Fineo	10 April 1987 (aged 29)		(Azerbaijan) Araz Naxçivan
6	FW	Eduardo Borges	14 October 1986 (aged 29)		(Azerbaijan) Araz Naxçivan
7	FW	Ramiz Chovdarov	28 July 1990 (aged 26)		(Azerbaijan) Araz Naxçivan
8	DF	Rizvan Farzaliyev	1 September 1979 (aged 37)		(Azerbaijan) Araz Naxçivan
9	FW	Fábio Poletto	13 February 1989 (aged 27)		(Azerbaijan) Araz Naxçivan
10	DF	Vassoura	26 April 1985 (aged 31)		(Azerbaijan) Araz Naxçivan
11	DF	Khatai Baghirov	15 August 1987 (aged 29)		(Azerbaijan) Araz Naxçivan
12	GK	Rovshan Huseynli	3 April 1991 (aged 25)		(Azerbaijan) Araz Naxçivan
13	DF	Gallo	4 December 1987 (aged 28)		(Azerbaijan) Araz Naxçivan
14	FW	Vitaliy Borisov	5 July 1982 (aged 34)		(Serbia) Ekonomac
