= 2012 FIFA Futsal World Cup =

ฟีฟ่า ฟุตซอลโลก ๒๕๕๕/๒๐๑๒ (Thai) FIFA Fút-sɔɔl lôok 2555/2012 Thailand 2012

Tournament details
- Host country: Thailand
- Dates: 1–18 November
- Teams: 24 (from 6 confederations)
- Venue: 3 (in 2 host cities)

Final positions
- Champions: Brazil (5th title)
- Runners-up: Spain
- Third place: Italy
- Fourth place: Colombia

Tournament statistics
- Matches played: 52
- Goals scored: 348 (6.69 per match)
- Attendance: 160,302 (3,083 per match)
- Top scorer: (Russia) Eder Lima (9 goals)
- Best player: (Brazil) Neto
- Best goalkeeper: (Italy) Stefano Mammarella
- Fair play award: Argentina

The 2012 FIFA Futsal World Cup was the seventh FIFA Futsal World Cup, the quadrennial international futsal championship contested by the men's national teams of the member associations of FIFA. It took place from 1 to 18 November 2012 in Thailand. An extra four teams (increase to 24 from 20 at the 2008 event in Brazil) were competing at this World Cup. This was the first FIFA men's tournament held in Southeast Asia since the Malaysia 1997 FIFA World Youth Championship, and was the first FIFA men's tournament held in the country, having hosted the 2004 FIFA U-19 Women's World Championship.

Defending champions Brazil won the title for the fifth time, defeating Spain in a rematch of the 2008 final.

== Bid process ==
On 20 July 2009, FIFA launched the bidding for the 2012 FIFA Futsal World Cup with the following timeline:

- Declaration of interest: 1 September 2009, deadline for the member associations to declare their interest in hosting the tournament.
- FIFA Hosting Agreements: 30 September 2009, deadline for FIFA to send out the Hosting Agreements to those associations who have declared an interest to host the tournament.
- Bidding Agreement: 15 November 2009, deadline for the member associations to reconfirm their interest in bidding the tournament.
- Hosting Agreement: 15 January 2010, deadline for the member associations to submit the signed Hosting Agreements.
- Appointment of hosts by the FIFA Executive Committee: March 2010.

On 19 March 2010, during its Executive Committee meeting, FIFA chose Thailand to host the 2012 FIFA Futsal World Cup. Thailand beat bids from China, Iran, Azerbaijan, Czech Republic, Sri Lanka and Guatemala.

== Qualification ==
The host nation, Thailand, qualified automatically.

=== Qualified nations ===
Competition	Date	Venue	Berths	Qualified
Host Nation			1	Thailand
2012 AFC Futsal Championship	25 May – 1 June 2012	United Arab Emirates	4	Japan; Iran; Australia; Kuwait^{1}
CAF Preliminary Competition	6 April – 24 June 2012		3	Egypt; Libya; Morocco^{1}
2012 CONCACAF Futsal Championship	2–8 July 2012	Guatemala	4	Costa Rica; Guatemala; Panama^{1} Mexico^{1}
CONMEBOL Preliminary Competition	15–22 April 2012	Brazil	4	Argentina; Paraguay; Brazil; Colombia^{1}
2011 Oceanian Futsal Championship	16–20 May 2011	Fiji	1	Solomon Islands
UEFA Preliminary Competition	19 October 2011 – 11 April 2012		7	Ukraine; Serbia^{1} Russia; Spain; Portugal; Czech Republic; Italy
Total			24	

1. Teams that will make their debut.

== Venues ==
The matches were originally due to take place across four venues. Due to construction delays and failure to meet the security requirement, early matches scheduled at the Bangkok Futsal Arena were moved to the Indoor Stadium Huamark. After the final inspection on 5 November, FIFA announced that the Bangkok Futsal Arena had not sufficiently met the criteria. The two quarter-final matches would be played at Nimibutr Stadium, while Indoor Stadium Huamark would host the semifinals and the final.

Bangkok		Nakhon Ratchasima
Indoor Stadium Huamark	Nimibutr Stadium	Korat Chatchai Hall
Capacity: 12,000	Capacity: 6,000	Capacity: 5,000
2012 FIFA Futsal World Cup is located in Thailand

== Squads ==
Each team submitted a squad of 14 players, including two goalkeepers. The squads were announced on 25 October 2012.

== Match officials ==
The following were the officials for the 2012 FIFA Futsal World Cup.

Confederation	Referees
AFC	(Kyrgyzstan) Nurdin Bukuev
AFC	(Lebanon) Mohamad Chami
AFC	(Australia) Scott Kidson
AFC	(South Korea) Kim Jang-kwan
AFC	(Japan) Naoki Miyatani
AFC	(Uzbekistan) Shukhrat Pulatov
AFC	(Iran) Alireza Sohrabi
AFC	(China) Zhang Youze
AFC	(Thailand) Kaveepol Kamawitee (reserve)
CAF	(Nigeria) Saheed Ayeni
CAF	(Egypt) Said Kadara
CAF	(Angola) José Katemo
CAF	(Mozambique) Eduardo Mahumane
CONCACAF	(Panama) Wenceslaos Aguilar
CONCACAF	(Cuba) Sergio Cabrera
CONCACAF	(Panama) Alexander Cline
CONCACAF	(Guatemala) Carlos González
CONCACAF	(Costa Rica) Geovanny López
CONCACAF	(Mexico) Francisco Rivera

Confederation	Referees
CONMEBOL	(Brazil) Sandro Brechane
CONMEBOL	(Colombia) Oswaldo Gómez
CONMEBOL	(Ecuador) Jaime Jativa
CONMEBOL	(Brazil) Renata Leite
CONMEBOL	(Uruguay) Daniel Rodríguez
CONMEBOL	(Peru) Héctor Rojas
CONMEBOL	(Paraguay) Joel Ruiz
CONMEBOL	(Argentina) Dario Santamaría
OFC	(Fiji) Amitesh Behari
OFC	(Solomon Islands) Rex Kamusu
UEFA	(England) Marc Birkett
UEFA	(Portugal) Eduardo Fernandes
UEFA	(Spain) Fernando Gutiérrez
UEFA	(Czech Republic) Karel Henych
UEFA	(Croatia) Danijel Janošević
UEFA	(Hungary) Gábor Kovács
UEFA	(Belgium) Pascal Lemal
UEFA	(Italy) Francesco Massini
UEFA	(Russia) Ivan Shabanov
UEFA	(Slovenia) Borut Sivic

== Draw ==
The official draw for the World Cup was held at the St. Regis Hotel in Bangkok, Thailand on 24 August 2012.

The 24 teams were divided in six groups, each group with four teams.

== Group stage ==
The group winners and runners up along with the 4 highest rank third places advanced to the round of 16.

The ranking of each team in each group will be determined as follows:

1. greatest number of points obtained in all group matches;
2. goal difference in all group matches;
3. greatest number of goals scored in all group matches;

If two or more teams are equal on the basis of the above three criteria, their rankings will be determined as follows:

1. greatest number of points obtained in the group matches between the teams concerned;
2. goal difference resulting from the group matches between the teams concerned;
3. greater number of goals scored in all group matches between the teams concerned;
4. drawing of lots by the FIFA Organising Committee.

All times are Thailand Standard Time (UTC+07:00).

=== Group A ===
Team	Pld	W	D	L	GF	GA	GD	Pts
Ukraine	3	2	1	0	14	7	+7	7
Paraguay	3	1	1	1	9	11	−2	4
Thailand	3	1	0	2	8	9	−1	3
Costa Rica	3	1	0	2	8	12	−4	3

1 November 2012
17:00

Ukraine	3–3	Paraguay
Pavlenko 10', 40'; Shoturma 35'	Report	Ayala 9', 30', 37'

Hua Mark Indoor, Bangkok
Attendance: 4,379
Referee: Wenceslao Aguilar (Panama)

1 November 2012
19:00

Thailand	3–1	Costa Rica
Kiatiyot 18'; Suphawut 29'; Jirawat 38'	Report	Zúñiga 37'

Indoor Stadium Huamark, Bangkok
Attendance: 4,379
Referee: Héctor Rojas (Peru)

4 November 2012
17:00

Paraguay	3–6	Costa Rica
Toruño 2' (o.g.); Alcaraz 11'; Villalba 37'	Report	Zúñiga 22'; Navarrete 25', 28'; Cubillo 27', 31', 40'

Indoor Stadium Huamark, Bangkok
Attendance: 5,613
Referee: Francesco Massini (Italy)

4 November 2012
19:00

Thailand	3–5	Ukraine
Kritsada 24'; Suphawut 35'; Jirawat 39'	Report	Ovsiannikov 4'; Chepornyuk 7'; Rogachov 13', 20'; Pavlenko 20'

Indoor Stadium Huamark, Bangkok
Attendance: 5,613
Referee: Sergio Cabrera (Cuba)

7 November 2012
19:00

Costa Rica	1–6	Ukraine
Cubillo 24'	Report	Rogachov 7', 16'; Ovsyannikov 17'; Sorokin 23', 32'; Pavlenko 29'

Korat Chatchai Hall, Nakhon Ratchasima
Attendance: 4,200
Referee: Daniel Rodríguez (Uruguay)

7 November 2012
19:00

Paraguay	3–2	Thailand
A. Salas 4'; Ayala 7'; J. Salas 10'	Report	Suphawut 11'; Jetsada 25'

Indoor Stadium Huamark, Bangkok
Attendance: 5,307
Referee: Ivan Shabanov (Russia)

=== Group B ===
Team	Pld	W	D	L	GF	GA	GD	Pts
Spain	3	2	1	0	15	6	+9	7
Iran	3	2	1	0	8	6	+2	7
Panama	3	1	0	2	14	15	−1	3
Morocco	3	0	0	3	5	15	−10	0

2 November 2012
19:00

Panama	8–3	Morocco
Pérez 20'; Lasso 22', 31'; Mena 23', 32'; Gálvez 25'; Hinks 34'; Goodridge 39'	Report	Jabrane 7'; Derrou 12'; Habil 16'

Indoor Stadium Huamark, Bangkok
Attendance: 3,579
Referee: Amitesh Behari (Fiji)

2 November 2012
21:00

Spain	2–2	Iran
Miguelín 5'; Lozano 16'	Report	Daneshvar 28'; H. Tayyebi 31'

Indoor Stadium Huamark, Bangkok
Attendance: 3,579
Referee: Francisco Rivera (Mexico)

5 November 2012
19:00

Morocco	1–2	Iran
El-Mazray 20'	Report	Hassanzadeh 20' (pen.); Kazemi 33'

Indoor Stadium Huamark, Bangkok
Attendance: 1,409
Referee: Carlos González (Guatemala)

5 November 2012
21:00

Spain	8–3	Panama
Kike 2'; Lin 8'; Borja 11', 22'; Aicardo 14', 20'; Alemao 27' (pen.); Miguelín 30'	Report	De Leon 17', 33'; Alvarado 30'

Indoor Stadium Huamark, Bangkok
Attendance: 1,409
Referee: Scott Kidson (Australia)

8 November 2012
19:00

Iran	4–3	Panama
Esmaeilpour 3'; Kazemi 14'; Taheri 19', 38'	Report	Goodridge 6'; Pérez 35' (pen.); Alvarado 40'

Nimibutr Stadium, Bangkok
Attendance: 1,400
Referee: Eduardo Fernandes (Portugal)

8 November 2012
19:00

Morocco	1–5	Spain
Talibi 22'	Report	Lozano 10', 12'; Borja 19'; Fernandão 33'; Álvaro 34'

Indoor Stadium Huamark, Bangkok
Attendance: 1,898
Referee: Naoki Miyatani (Japan)

=== Group C ===
Team	Pld	W	D	L	GF	GA	GD	Pts
Brazil	3	3	0	0	20	2	+18	9
Portugal	3	1	1	1	11	9	+2	4
Japan	3	1	1	1	10	11	−1	4
Libya	3	0	0	3	3	22	−19	0

1 November 2012
19:00

Libya	1–5	Portugal
A. Fathe 6'	Report	Cardinal 2', 16', 18'; Nandinho 27'; Marinho 29'

Korat Chatchai Hall, Nakhon Ratchasima
Attendance: 4,298
Referee: Alireza Sohrabi (Iran)

1 November 2012
21:00

Brazil	4–1	Japan
Wilde 14', 23'; Neto 21'; Vinicius 25'	Report	Inaba 28'

Korat Chatchai Hall, Nakhon Ratchasima
Attendance: 4,298
Referee: Gábor Kovács (Hungary)

4 November 2012
19:00

Portugal	5–5	Japan
Matos 1'; Ricardinho 2', 18'; Cardinal 9', 12'	Report	Morioka 11', 33'; Hoshi 19'; Kitahara 32'; Henmi 36'

Korat Chatchai Hall, Nakhon Ratchasima
Attendance: 4,350
Referee: Daniel Rodríguez (Uruguay)

4 November 2012
21:00

Brazil	13–0	Libya
Gabriel 7'; Rodrigo 8', 10'; Neto 15'; Fernandinho 17', 31', 33', 34'; Vinicius 25'; Jé 31', 34', 38'; Rafael 39'	Report

Korat Chatchai Hall, Nakhon Ratchasima
Attendance: 4,350
Referee: Danijel Janošević (Croatia)

7 November 2012
17:00

Japan	4–2	Libya
Inaba 18', 26'; Hoshi 25'; Osodo 32'	Report	Rahoma 18', 38' (pen.)

Indoor Stadium Huamark, Bangkok
Attendance: 5,307
Referee: Francesco Massini (Italy)

7 November 2012
17:00

Portugal	1–3	Brazil
Cardinal 14'	Report	Simi 12'; Fernandinho 29'; Neto 40'

Korat Chatchai Hall, Nakhon Ratchasima
Attendance: 4,200
Referee: Wenceslaos Aguilar (Panama)

=== Group D ===
Team	Pld	W	D	L	GF	GA	GD	Pts
Italy	3	3	0	0	17	5	+12	9
Argentina	3	2	0	1	14	5	+9	6
Australia	3	1	0	2	5	17	−12	3
Mexico	3	0	0	3	4	13	−9	0

2 November 2012
17:00

Italy	9–1	Australia
Fortino 14'; Assis 15', 23'; Lima 17'; Forte 19'; Romano 20'; Honorio 26'; Mentasti 28'; Merlim 30'	Report	Ngaluafe 33'

Nimibutr Stadium, Bangkok
Attendance: 3,000
Referee: Eduardo Mahumane (Mozambique)

2 November 2012
19:00

Argentina	5–1	Mexico
Basile 5'; Rescia 14'; Amas 26'; Borruto 29', 31'	Report	Rodríguez 37'

Nimibutr Stadium, Bangkok
Attendance: 2,400
Referee: Eduardo Fernandes (Portugal)

5 November 2012
17:00

Australia	3–1	Mexico
Seeto 27'; Cimitile 27'; Giovenali 36'	Report	Quiroz 7'

Nimibutr Stadium, Bangkok
Attendance: 3,800
Referee: Fernando Gutiérrez (Spain)

5 November 2012
19:00

Argentina	2–3	Italy
Rescia 3'; Cuzzolino 40'	Report	Lima 13'; Fortino 19'; Assis 38'

Nimibutr Stadium, Bangkok
Attendance: 3,800
Referee: Nurdin Bukuev (Kyrgyzstan)

8 November 2012
17:00

Mexico	2–5	Italy
Plata 23', 33'	Report	Ercolessi 18', 24'; Fortino 26', 35'; Leggiero 36'

Indoor Stadium Huamark, Bangkok
Attendance: 1,898
Referee: Sandro Brechane (Brazil)

8 November 2012
17:00

Australia	1–7	Argentina
Seeto 6'	Report	Borruto 1', 39'; Cuzzolino 7'; Lucuix 15'; Vaporaki 22'; Garcías 28'; Amas 37'

Nimibutr Stadium, Bangkok
Attendance: 1,400
Referee: Marc Birkett (England)

=== Group E ===
Team	Pld	W	D	L	GF	GA	GD	Pts
Serbia	3	2	1	0	12	5	+7	7
Czech Republic	3	1	1	1	7	11	−4	4
Egypt	3	1	0	2	11	9	+2	3
Kuwait	3	1	0	2	8	13	−5	3

3 November 2012
19:00

Czech Republic	3–2	Kuwait
Kopecký 5'; Belej 23'; Koudelka 35'	Report	Al-Awadhi 38'; Al-Taweel 40'

Indoor Stadium Huamark, Bangkok
Attendance: 1,407
Referee: Dario Santamaría (Argentina)

3 November 2012
21:00

Egypt	1–3	Serbia
Mohamed 40'	Report	Bojović 23'; Janjić 37' (pen.); Kocić 39'

Indoor Stadium Huamark, Bangkok
Attendance: 1,407
Referee: Joel Ruiz (Paraguay)

6 November 2012
19:00

Kuwait	2–7	Serbia
Al-Farsi 22', 37'	Report	Kocić 7', 18'; Lazić 20', 25'; Rajčević 28'; Bojović 32'; Pavićević 39'

Indoor Stadium Huamark, Bangkok
Attendance: 552
Referee: Renata Leite (Brazil)

6 November 2012
21:00

Egypt	7–2	Czech Republic
Samasry 11', 31', 37'; Bougy 19'; Mohamed 22'; Nader 34'; Mizo 38'	Report	Slovacek 5'; Rešetár 26'

Indoor Stadium Huamark, Bangkok
Attendance: 552
Referee: Alireza Sohrabi (Iran)

9 November 2012
19:00

Serbia	2–2	Czech Republic
Kocić 6'; Bojović 36'	Report	Seidler 33'; Belej 36'

Nimibutr Stadium, Bangkok
Attendance: 1,370
Referee: Fernando Gutiérrez (Spain)

9 November 2012
19:00

Kuwait	4–3	Egypt
Al-Farsi 3'; Al-Mutairi 6', 7'; Al-Taweel 20'	Report	Bougy 15'; Mohamed 37', 39'

Indoor Stadium Huamark, Bangkok
Attendance: 1,152
Referee: Sergio Cabrera (Cuba)

=== Group F ===
Team	Pld	W	D	L	GF	GA	GD	Pts
Russia	3	3	0	0	27	0	+27	9
Colombia	3	1	0	2	13	10	+3	3
Guatemala	3	1	0	2	8	15	−7	3
Solomon Islands	3	1	0	2	7	30	−23	3

3 November 2012
17:00

Guatemala	5–2	Colombia
González 13'; Escobar 29'; Aguilar 31'; Acevedo 32'; Enríquez 40'	Report	Serna 7'; Reyes 19'

Nimibutr Stadium, Bangkok
Attendance: 2,300
Referee: Karel Henych (Czech Republic)

3 November 2012
19:00

Russia	16–0	Solomon Islands
Cirilo 3'; Pula 3'; Lima 5', 11', 18', 20', 20', 34', 40'; Prudnikov 19'; Sergeev 22', 30'; Robinho 25'; Suchilin 27'; Fukin 28', 36'	Report

Nimibutr Stadium, Bangkok
Attendance: 2,300
Referee: Kim Jang-kwan (South Korea)

6 November 2012
17:00

Colombia	11–3	Solomon Islands
Toro 7', 20', 38'; Quiroz 8'; Reyes 22', 33'; Duque 30'; Abril 35'; Caro 40'; Fonnegra 40'; Prado 40'	Report	Ragomo 14' (pen.); Osifelo 15'; Lea'alafa 20'

Nimibutr Stadium, Bangkok
Attendance: 1,300
Referee: Borut Sivic (Slovenia)

6 November 2012
19:00

Russia	9–0	Guatemala
Sergeev 1', 15', 16'; Shayakhmetov 3'; Cirilo 8'; Prudnikov 12', 35'; Lima 27'; Suchilin 35'	Report

Nimibutr Stadium, Bangkok
Attendance: 1,300
Referee: Héctor Rojas (Peru)

9 November 2012
17:00

Solomon Islands	4–3	Guatemala
Stevenson 15'; Bule 17'; Lea'alafa 28'; Talo 36'	Report	De León 9'; Aguilar 22'; Enríquez 40'

Indoor Stadium Huamark, Bangkok
Attendance: 1,152
Referee: Francesco Massini (Italy)

9 November 2012
17:00

Colombia	0–2	Russia
	Report	Cirilo 4'; Robinho 24'

Nimibutr Stadium, Bangkok
Attendance: 1,370
Referee: Scott Kidson (Australia)

=== Ranking of third-placed teams ===
Grp	Team	Pld	W	D	L	GF	GA	GD	Pts
C	Japan	3	1	1	1	10	11	−1	4
E	Egypt	3	1	0	2	11	9	+2	3
B	Panama	3	1	0	2	14	15	−1	3
A	Thailand	3	1	0	2	8	9	−1	3
F	Guatemala	3	1	0	2	8	15	−7	3
D	Australia	3	1	0	2	5	17	−12	3

== Knockout phase ==
In the knockout stages, if a match is level at the end of normal playing time, extra time shall be played (two periods of five minutes each) and followed, if necessary, by kicks from the penalty mark to determine the winner. However, for the third place match, no extra time shall be played and the winner shall be determined by kicks from the penalty mark.

Round of 16
11 November – Bangkok (HMI)
Paraguay	1
Portugal	4
12 November – N. Ratchasima
Italy	5
Egypt	1
11 November – Bangkok (NI)
Spain	7
Thailand	1
12 November – Bangkok (HMI)
Russia	3
Czech Republic	0
12 November – Bangkok (HMI)
Serbia	1
Argentina	2
12 November – N. Ratchasima
Brazil	16
Panama	0
11 November – Bangkok (NI)
Iran	1
Colombia	2
11 November – Bangkok (HMI)
Ukraine	6
Japan	3

Quarter-finals
14 November – Bangkok (NI)
Portugal	3
Italy (a.e.t.)	4
14 November – Bangkok (NI)
Spain	3
Russia	2
14 November – Bangkok (HMI)
Argentina	2
Brazil (a.e.t.)	3
14 November – Bangkok (HMI)
Colombia	3
Ukraine	1

Semi-finals
16 November – Bangkok (HMI)
Italy	1
Spain	4
16 November – Bangkok (HMI)
Brazil	3
Colombia	1

Final
18 November – Bangkok (HMI)
Spain	2
Brazil (a.e.t.)	3
Third place
18 November – Bangkok (HMI)
Italy	3
Colombia	0

=== Round of 16 ===
11 November 2012
16:00

Paraguay	1–4	Portugal
J. Salas 36'	Report	Cardinal 12'; Matos 20'; Ricardinho 39', 40'

Indoor Stadium Huamark, Bangkok
Attendance: 3,579
Referee: Daniel Rodríguez (Uruguay)

11 November 2012
18:30

Ukraine	6–3	Japan
Chepornyuk 3'; Fedorchenko 5'; Zhurba 10'; Rogachov 13'; Ovsyannikov 16', 16'	Report	Morioka 30', 31'; Kitahara 32'

Indoor Stadium Huamark, Bangkok
Attendance: 3,579
Referee: Renata Leite (Brazil)

11 November 2012
18:30

Spain	7–1	Thailand
Torras 10', 17'; Fernandão 25', 28'; Aicardo 30'; Ortiz 34'; Álvaro 38'	Report	Kritsada 39'

Nimibutr Stadium, Bangkok
Attendance: 4,170
Referee: Alexander Cline (Panama)

11 November 2012
21:00

Iran	1–2	Colombia
Rahnama 35'	Report	Duque 30'; Caro 34'

Nimibutr Stadium, Bangkok
Attendance: 4,170
Referee: Ivan Shabanov (Russia)

12 November 2012
16:00

Italy	5–1	Egypt
Assis 4', 11', 31' dos Santos 20'; Fortino 33'	Report	Abou Serie 11'

Korat Chatchai Hall, Nakhon Ratchasima
Attendance: 3,644
Referee: Nurdin Bukuev (Kyrgyzstan)

12 November 2012
18:30

Brazil	16–0	Panama
Fernandinho 4', 38'; Jé 6', 19', 35'; Rodrigo 7', 33'; Ari 8', 10', 39'; Simi 12'; Neto 13'; Vinícius 23'; Rafael 30', 34'; Falcão 37'	Report

Korat Chatchai Hall, Nakhon Ratchasima
Attendance: 3,644
Referee: Fernando Gutierrez (Spain)

12 November 2012
18:30

Russia	3–0	Czech Republic
Lima 7'; Pula 10'; Cirilo 29'	Report

Indoor Stadium Huamark, Bangkok
Attendance: 1,355
Referee: Wenceslao Aguilar (Panama)

12 November 2012
21:00

Serbia	1–2	Argentina
Rajčević 37'	Report	Cuzzolino 11'; Rescia 17'

Indoor Stadium Huamark, Bangkok
Attendance: 1,355
Referee: Héctor Rojas (Peru)

=== Quarter-finals ===
14 November 2012
16:00

Argentina	2–3 (a.e.t.)	Brazil
Rescia 17'; Borruto 18'	Report	Neto 33'; Falcão 35', 45'

Indoor Stadium Huamark, Bangkok
Attendance: 3,007
Referee: Wenceslao Aguilar (Panama)

14 November 2012
18:30

Colombia	3–1	Ukraine
Reyes 23'; Caro 40'; Abril 40'	Report	Ovsyannikov 40'

Indoor Stadium Huamark, Bangkok
Attendance: 3,007
Referee: Sergio Cabrera (Cuba)

14 November 2012
18:30

Portugal	3–4 (a.e.t.)	Italy
Ricardinho 2', 11', 12'	Report	Assis 22' (pen.); Lima 38'; Fortino 40'; Honorio 42'

Nimibutr Stadium, Bangkok
Attendance: 3,100
Referee: Karel Henych (Czech Republic)

14 November 2012
21:00

Spain	3–2	Russia
Ortiz 4'; Fernandão 13'; Lozano 19'	Report	Cirilo 2'; Alemao 34' (o.g.)

Nimibutr Stadium, Bangkok
Attendance: 3,100
Referee: Marc Birkett (England)

=== Semi-finals ===
16 November 2012
17:00

Italy	1–4	Spain
Merlim 30'	Report	Assis 9' (o.g.); Alemao 30'; Lozano 34'; Lin 38'

Indoor Stadium Huamark, Bangkok
Attendance: 4,597
Referee: Nurdin Bukuev (Kyrgyzstan)

16 November 2012
19:30

Brazil	3–1	Colombia
Gabriel 17', 28'; Toro 29' (o.g.)	Report	Toro 19'

Indoor Stadium Huamark, Bangkok
Attendance: 4,597
Referee: Daniel Rodriguez (Uruguay)

=== Third place match ===
18 November 2012
17:00

Italy	3–0	Colombia
Romano 28'; Fortino 33', 40'	Report

Indoor Stadium Huamark, Bangkok
Attendance: 5,685
Referee: Jose Katemo (Angola)

=== Final ===
18 November 2012
19:30

Spain	2–3 (a.e.t.)	Brazil
Torras 30'; Aicardo 31'	Report	Neto 25', 50'; Falcão 37'

Indoor Stadium Huamark, Bangkok
Attendance: 5,685
Referee: Héctor Rojas (Peru)

== Champions ==
FIFA Futsal World Cup
2012 winners

Brazil
Fifth title

== Goalscorers ==
9 goals

- (Russia) Éder Lima

8 goals

- (Italy) Rodolfo Fortino

7 goals

- (Brazil) Fernandinho
- (Brazil) Neto
- (Italy) Saad Assis
- (Portugal) Cardinal
- (Portugal) Ricardinho

6 goals

- (Brazil) Jé

5 goals

- (Argentina) Cristian Borruto
- (Russia) Cirilo
- (Russia) Sergei Sergeev
- (Spain) Lozano
- (Ukraine) Denys Ovsyannikov
- (Ukraine) Yevgen Rogachov

4 goals

- (Argentina) Maximiliano Rescia
- (Brazil) Falcão
- (Brazil) Rodrigo
- (Colombia) Andrés Reyes
- (Colombia) Jhonathan Toro
- (Costa Rica) Edwin Cubillo
- (Egypt) Ahmed Mohamed
- (Japan) Kaoru Morioka
- (Paraguay) Enmanuel Ayala
- (Serbia) Mladen Kocić
- (Spain) Aicardo
- (Spain) Fernandão
- (Ukraine) Maxym Pavlenko

3 goals

- (Argentina) Leandro Cuzzolino
- (Brazil) Ari
- (Brazil) Gabriel
- (Brazil) Rafael
- (Brazil) Vinícius
- (Colombia) Angellott Caro
- (Egypt) Ramadan Samasry
- (Italy) Gabriel Lima
- (Japan) Kotaro Inaba
- (Kuwait) Ahmad Al-Farsi
- (Russia) Dmitri Prudnikov
- (Serbia) Vidan Bojović
- (Spain) Borja
- (Spain) Jordi Torras
- (Thailand) Suphawut Thueanklang

2 goals

- (Argentina) Martín Amas
- (Australia) Tobias Seeto
- (Brazil) Simi
- (Brazil) Wilde
- (Colombia) Jorge Abril
- (Colombia) Yefri Duque
- (Costa Rica) Luis Navarrete
- (Costa Rica) Diego Zúñiga
- (Czech Republic) Michal Belej
- (Egypt) Ibrahim Bougy
- (Guatemala) Alan Aguilar
- (Guatemala) Walter Enríquez
- (Iran) Afshin Kazemi
- (Iran) Mohammad Taheri
- (Italy) Marco Ercolessi
- (Italy) Humberto Honorio
- (Italy) Alex Merlim
- (Italy) Sergio Romano
- (Japan) Shota Hoshi
- (Japan) Wataru Kitahara
- (Kuwait) Shaker Al-Mutairi
- (Kuwait) Abdulrahman Al-Taweel
- (Libya) Mohammed Rahoma
- (Mexico) Morgan Plata
- (Panama) Alquis Alvarado
- (Panama) Michael De Leon
- (Panama) Claudio Goodridge
- (Panama) Miguel Lasso
- (Panama) Fernando Mena
- (Panama) Carlos Pérez
- (Paraguay) Juan Salas
- (Portugal) Matos
- (Russia) Aleksandr Fukin
- (Russia) Pula
- (Russia) Robinho
- (Russia) Pavel Suchilin
- (Serbia) Vladimir Lazić
- (Serbia) Slobodan Rajčević
- (Solomon Islands) Micah Leaalafa
- (Spain) Alemao
- (Spain) Álvaro
- (Spain) Lin
- (Spain) Miguelín
- (Spain) Ortiz
- (Thailand) Jirawat Sornwichian
- (Thailand) Kritsada Wongkaeo
- (Ukraine) Serhiy Chepornyuk
- (Ukraine) Oleksandr Sorokin

1 goal

- (Argentina) Santiago Basile
- (Argentina) Hernán Garcías
- (Argentina) Matías Lucuix
- (Argentina) Alamiro Vaporaki
- (Australia) Aaron Cimitile
- (Australia) Greg Giovenali
- (Australia) Danny Ngaluafe
- (Colombia) Yeisson Fonnegra
- (Colombia) Johann Prado
- (Colombia) Jose Quiroz
- (Colombia) Alejandro Serna
- (Czech Republic) Marek Kopecký
- (Czech Republic) Tomáš Koudelka
- (Czech Republic) Lukáš Rešetár
- (Czech Republic) Michal Seidler
- (Czech Republic) Matěj Slovacek
- (Egypt) Ahmed Abou Serie
- (Egypt) Mizo
- (Egypt) Mostafa Nader
- (Guatemala) Erick Acevedo
- (Guatemala) Estuardo De León
- (Guatemala) Armando Escobar
- (Guatemala) José Rafael González
- (Iran) Masoud Daneshvar
- (Iran) Ahmad Esmaeilpour
- (Iran) Ali Asghar Hassanzadeh
- (Iran) Ali Rahnama
- (Iran) Hossein Tayyebi
- (Italy) Jairo dos Santos
- (Italy) Marcio Forte
- (Italy) Luca Leggiero
- (Italy) Giuseppe Mentasti
- (Japan) Rafael Henmi
- (Japan) Nobuya Osodo
- (Kuwait) Hamad Al-Awadhi
- (Libya) Ahmed Fathe
- (Mexico) Victor Quiroz
- (Mexico) Jorge Rodríguez
- (Morocco) Aziz Derrou
- (Morocco) Youssef El-Mazray
- (Morocco) Adil Habil
- (Morocco) Yahya Jabrane
- (Morocco) Mohammed Talibi
- (Panama) Apolinar Gálvez
- (Panama) Óscar Hinks
- (Paraguay) Fabio Alcaraz
- (Paraguay) Adolfo Salas
- (Paraguay) Walter Villalba
- (Portugal) Marinho
- (Portugal) Nandinho
- (Russia) Vladislav Shayakhmetov
- (Serbia) Slobodan Janjić
- (Serbia) Bojan Pavićević
- (Solomon Islands) Bule
- (Solomon Islands) Samuel Osifelo
- (Solomon Islands) Elliot Ragomo
- (Solomon Islands) Stevenson
- (Solomon Islands) Anthony Talo
- (Spain) Kike
- (Thailand) Keattiyot Chalaemkhet
- (Thailand) Jetsada Chudech
- (Ukraine) Dmytro Fedorchenko
- (Ukraine) Petro Shoturma
- (Ukraine) Serhiy Zhurba

Own goals

- (Colombia) Jhonathan Toro (playing against Brazil)
- (Costa Rica) Jairo Toruño (playing against Paraguay)
- (Italy) Saad Assis (playing against Spain)
- (Spain) Alemao (playing against Russia)

== Awards ==
The following awards were given for the tournament:

Golden Shoe winner	Golden Ball winner	Golden Gloves winner
(Russia) Eder Lima	(Brazil) Neto	(Italy) Stefano Mammarella
Silver Shoe winner	Silver Ball winner	Goal of the Tournament
(Italy) Rodolfo Fortino	(Spain) Kike	(Thailand) Suphawut Thueanklang
Bronze Shoe winner	Bronze Ball winner	FIFA Fair Play Trophy
(Brazil) Fernandinho	(Portugal) Ricardinho	Argentina

== Tournament ranking ==
Per statistical convention in football, matches decided in extra time are counted as wins and losses, while matches decided by penalty shoot-out are counted as draws.

Pos	Team	Pld	W	D	L	GF	GA	GD	Pts	Final result
1	Brazil	7	7	0	0	45	7	+38	21	Champions
2	Spain	7	5	1	1	31	13	+18	16	Runners-up
3	Italy	7	6	0	1	30	13	+17	18	Third place
4	Colombia	7	3	0	4	19	18	+1	9	Fourth place
5	Russia	5	4	0	1	32	3	+29	12	Eliminated in Quarter-finals
6	Ukraine	5	3	1	1	21	13	+8	10	Eliminated in Quarter-finals
7	Argentina	5	3	0	2	18	9	+9	9	Eliminated in Quarter-finals
8	Portugal	5	2	1	2	18	14	+4	7	Eliminated in Quarter-finals
9	Serbia	4	2	1	1	13	7	+6	7	Eliminated in Round of 16
10	Iran	4	2	1	1	9	8	+1	7	Eliminated in Round of 16
11	Japan	4	1	1	2	13	17	–4	4	Eliminated in Round of 16
12	Paraguay	4	1	1	2	10	15	–5	4	Eliminated in Round of 16
13	Czech Republic	4	1	1	2	7	14	–7	4	Eliminated in Round of 16
14	Egypt	4	1	0	3	12	14	–2	3	Eliminated in Round of 16
15	Thailand	4	1	0	3	9	16	–7	3	Eliminated in Round of 16
16	Panama	4	1	0	3	14	31	–17	3	Eliminated in Round of 16
17	Costa Rica	3	1	0	2	8	12	–4	3	Eliminated in Group stage
18	Kuwait	3	1	0	2	8	13	–5	3	Eliminated in Group stage
19	Guatemala	3	1	0	2	8	15	–7	3	Eliminated in Group stage
20	Australia	3	1	0	2	5	17	–12	3	Eliminated in Group stage
21	Solomon Islands	3	1	0	2	7	30	–23	3	Eliminated in Group stage
22	Mexico	3	0	0	3	4	13	–9	0	Eliminated in Group stage
23	Morocco	3	0	0	3	5	15	–10	0	Eliminated in Group stage
24	Libya	3	0	0	3	3	22	–19	0	Eliminated in Group stage

== Symbols ==
=== Official song ===
The official song of 2012 FIFA Futsal World Cup was "Heart & Soul", a single by the Thai band Slot Machine.
