= 2014 Futsal Continental Cup =

2014 Futsal Confederations Cup
Tournament details
- Host country: Kuwait
- Dates: 23 October – 28 October
- Teams: 8 (from 4 confederations)
- Venue: 1 (in 1 host city)

Final positions
- Champions: Argentina (1st title)
- Runners-up: Czech Republic
- Third place: Brazil
- Fourth place: Italy

Tournament statistics
- Matches played: 16
- Goals scored: 91 (5.69 per match)
- Top scorer: (Czech Republic) Michal Seidler (7 goals)

The third edition of the Futsal Confederations Cup, which was called the Futsal Continental Cup for this tournament, was held in Kuwait from October 23 to October 28, 2014.

The tournament was organized by the federations of national participants, in collaboration with Sheikh Talal Al Mohammad Al Sabah, but was not approved by FIFA. Eight teams took part: Egypt, Argentina, Italy, Kuwait (included in Group A), Brazil, Czech Republic, Japan and Guatemala (included in Group B).

== Teams ==
Team	Confederation	Qualification
Kuwait	AFC	Host
Egypt	CAF	Wildcard
Italy	UEFA	UEFA Futsal Euro 2014 Winners
Argentina	CONMEBOL	2011 Copa América Runners-up
Brazil	CONMEBOL	2011 Copa América Winners; 2012 FIFA Futsal World Cup Winners
Japan	AFC	2014 AFC Futsal Championship Winners
Guatemala	CONCACAF	2012 CONCACAF Futsal Championship Runners-up
Czech Republic	UEFA	Invited

== Group stage ==
=== Group A ===
Team	Pld	W	D	L	GF	GA	GD	Pts	Qualification
Italy	3	3	0	0	9	5	+4	9	Semi-finals
Argentina	3	2	0	1	13	5	+8	6	Semi-finals
Egypt	3	1	0	2	8	11	−3	3	
Kuwait	3	0	0	3	6	15	−9	0	

23 October 2014

Kuwait	2 – 4	Italy
Abdulrahman Altawail 17'; Ahmad Alfarsi 18'		Massimo De Luca 16', 31', 38'; Mauro Canal 39'

Kuwait City
23 October 2014

Argentina	6 – 1	Egypt
Fernando Wilhelm 2'; Cristian Borruto 3'; Pablo Taborda 7'; Constantino Vaporaki 12', 13'; Leandro Cuzzolino 31'		Ahmed Abdelkader 23'

Kuwait City

24 October 2014

Egypt	2 – 3	Italy
Karim Ahmed 38'; Mostafa Eid 39'		Sergio Romano 9'; Mauro Canal 10'; Júlio de Oliveira 36'

Kuwait City
24 October 2014

Kuwait	2 – 6	Argentina
Abdulrahman Altawail 19'; Saleh Hasan 34'		Alamiro Vaporaki 3', 10'; Leandro Cuzzolino 9', 19'; Cristian Borruto 39'

Kuwait City

25 October 2014

Italy	2 – 1	Argentina
Humberto Honorio 21'; Mauro Canal 39'		Cristian Borruto 25'

Kuwait City
25 October 2014

Kuwait	2 – 5	Egypt
Hamad Hayat 18', 27'		Mostafa Eid 13'; Ahmed Abdelkader 16'; Ramadan Sama 19'; Ibrahim Bekhit 24'; Mostafa Rezk 35'

Kuwait City

=== Group B ===
Team	Pld	W	D	L	GF	GA	GD	Pts	Qualification
Brazil	3	3	0	0	16	3	+13	9	Semi-finals
Czech Republic	3	2	0	1	11	8	+3	6	Semi-finals
Japan	3	1	0	2	6	9	−3	3	
Guatemala	3	0	0	3	4	17	−13	0	

23 October 2014

Czech Republic	6 – 2	Guatemala
Michal Seidler 8', 10', 16', 19'; Michal Belej 24', 24'		Manuel Pellecer 15'; Edgar Rodríguez 34'

Kuwait City
23 October 2014

Brazil	5 – 0	Japan
Francisco Alves 5'; Marcenio Da Silva 25'; Darlan Lopes 29', 29'; Jefferson Carpes 32'

Kuwait City

24 October 2014

Japan	0 – 4	Czech Republic
		Lukáš Rešetár 3', 23', 39'; Michal Seidler 25'

Kuwait City
24 October 2014

Guatemala	2 – 5	Brazil
Walter Enriquez 6'; Manuel Pellecer 11'		Alexandre Faria 9', 39'; Rafael Novaes 10'; Marcenio Da Silva 25'; Darlan Lopes 38'

Kuwait City

25 October 2014

Japan	6 – 0	Guatemala
Bruno Takashi 14', 31'; Manabu Takita 17'; Akita Minamoto 22'; Yuki Murota 30'; Nobuya Osodo 33'

Kuwait City
25 October 2014

Brazil	6 – 1	Czech Republic
Jefferson Carpes 1'; Rafael Novaes 8'; Tiago Wanderley 12'; Darlan Lopes 32', 35'; Carlos Murilo 34'		Rodek 6'

Kuwait City

== Knockout stage ==
Semi-finals
27 October – Kuwait City
Argentina	4
Brazil	1
27 October – Kuwait City
Italy	1 (2)
Czech Republic (p)	1 (3)

Final
28 October – Kuwait City
Argentina	6
Czech Republic	2
Third place
28 October – Kuwait City
Italy	0
Brazil	3

=== Semi-finals ===
27 October 2014

Argentina	4 – 1	Brazil
Cristian Borruto 13'; Maximiliano Rescia 22'; Fernando Wilhelm 23', 40'		Carlos Murilo 20'

Kuwait City
Referee: Mario Moncada (Col) Jorge Flores (SLV)

27 October 2014

Italy	1 – 1 (a.e.t.)	Czech Republic
Murilo Ferreira 33'		Michal Seidler 24'
Penalties
Mauro Canal (penalty scored); Massimo De Luca (penalty missed); Fabricio Calderolli (penalty scored); Marco Ercolessi (penalty missed)	2 – 3	(penalty scored) Kovacs; (penalty scored) Michal Holy; (penalty missed) Michal Belej; (penalty scored) Michal Seidler

Kuwait City

=== Third Place ===
28 October 2014

Italy	0 – 3	Brazil
		Jefferson Carpes 31'; Tiago Wanderley 35'; Marcenio Da Silva 39'

Kuwait City

=== Final ===
28 October 2014

Argentina	6 – 2	Czech Republic
Gerardo Battistoni 8'; Leandro Cuzzolino 14', 37'; Alamiro Tello 19'; Constantino Vaporaki 34'; Fernando Wilhelm 35'		Michal Holy 2'; Michal Seidler 32'

Kuwait City

== Honors ==
2014 Futsal Continental Cup

Argentina
First title
