= Menichelli =

Menichelli is an Italian surname. Notable people with the surname include:

- Edoardo Menichelli (1939–2025), Italian Roman Catholic bishop and cardinal
- Franco Menichelli (1941–2026), Italian gymnast
- Giampaolo Menichelli (born 1938), Italian footballer
- Pina Menichelli (1890–1984), Italian actress
- Roberto Menichelli (born 1963), Italian futsal player and coach

== See also ==
- 24818 Menichelli, a main-belt asteroid
