= Neto (futsal player) =

Brazilian futsal player

Personal information
- Full name: Dovenir Domingues Neto
- Date of birth: 5 September 1981 (age 45)
- Place of birth: Uberlandia, Brazil
- Height: 1.78 m (5 ft 10 in)
- Position: Defender

Team information
- Current team: Kairat Almaty
- Number: 4

Senior career*
Years	Team	Apps	(Gls)
1998–2000	At. Mineiro		
2001–2002	Minas		
2003–2004	Ulbra		
2004–2010	Inter Movistar		
2010	Malwee/Jaraguá		
2011	Santos		
2012	Joinville		
2013–2016	Gazprom UGRA		
2016	Split Tommy		
2016–	Kairat Almaty		

International career
- Brazil
- * Club domestic league appearances and goals

Dovenir Domingues Neto (born 5 September 1981), commonly known as Neto, is a Brazilian futsal player who plays for Kairat Almaty and the Brazilian national futsal team.

== Personal life ==
Neto was born in Uberlandia, Brazil on September 5, 1981.

== Awards ==
- World Cup Gold Ball (2012)
- Best Fixed Futsal League 2011
- FIFA Futsal World Cup: 2012
- Copa America de Futsal:2011
- Best Player Copa America de Futsal:2011
