= Jakub Žďánský =

Czech futsal player

Žďánský
Personal information
- Full name: Jakub Žďánský
- Date of birth: 28 May 1986 (age 40)
- Place of birth: Czechoslovakia
- Position: Goalkeeper

Team information
- Current team: Era-Pack Chrudim

International career
Years	Team	Apps	(Gls)
2010–2014	Czech Republic	50	(0)

Jakub Žďánský (born 28 May 1986) is a Czech futsal player who plays for Era-Pack Chrudim and the Czech Republic national futsal team. He played in the 2012 FIFA Futsal World Cup.
