= Czech Futsal First League =

Futsal league in the Czech Republic

- Country: Czech Republic
- Number of clubs: 12
- Level on pyramid: 1
- International cup: UEFA Futsal Cup
- Website: https://www.futsalliga.cz/
- Current: Current Season at UEFA.com

The 1. Liga Futsalu is the premier futsal league in the Czech Republic, is organized by Football Association of the Czech Republic.

== Champions ==
Season	Winner
1992/1993	Ajax Novesta Zlin
1993/1994	IFT Computers Ostrava
1994/1995	IFT Computers Ostrava
1995/1996	DFC Praha
1996/1997	Mikeska Ostrava
1997/1998	Mikeska Ostrava
1998/1999	Viktoria Zizkov
1999/2000	TS Bakov
2000/2001	Pramen Havlíčkův Brod
2001/2002	Cigi Caga Jistebník
2002/2003	Nejzbach Vysoké Myto
2003/2004	Era-Pack Chrudim
2004/2005	Era-Pack Chrudim
2005/2006	Jistebník Ostrava
2006/2007	Era-Pack Chrudim
2007/2008	Era-Pack Chrudim
2008/2009	Era-Pack Chrudim
2009/2010	Era-Pack Chrudim
2010/2011	Era-Pack Chrudim
2011/2012	Era-Pack Chrudim
2012/2013	Era-Pack Chrudim
2013/2014	Era-Pack Chrudim
2014/2015	Era-Pack Chrudim
2015/2016	Era-Pack Chrudim
2016/2017	Era-Pack Chrudim
2017/2018	Era-Pack Chrudim
2018/2019	AC Sparta Praha
2019/2020	Era-Pack Chrudim
2020/2021	SK Interobal Plzeň
2021/2022	Era-Pack Chrudim
2022/2023	SK Interobal Plzeň
2023/2024	Era-Pack Chrudim
2024/2025	Era-Pack Chrudim
2025/2026	Era-Pack Chrudim

== Titles ==
Number	Team	Season
19	Era-Pack Chrudim	2004, 2005, 2007, 2008, 2009, 2010, 2011, 2012, 2013, 2014, 2015, 2016, 2017, 2018, 2020, 2022, 2024, 2025, 2026
2	IFT Computers Ostrava	1994, 1995
2	Mikeska Ostrava	1997, 1998
2	Jistebník Ostrava	2002, 2006
2	DFC Praha	1996, 1999
2	SK Interobal Plzeň	2021, 2023
1	Ajax Novesta Zlín	1993
1	TS Bakov	2000
1	Pramen Havlíčkův Brod	2001
1	Nejzbach Vysoké Myto	2003
1	AC Sparta Praha	2019
