= Anthony Talo =

Solomon Islands footballer and futsal player

Personal information
- Full name: Anthony Talo Furai
- Date of birth: 8 January 1996 (age 30)
- Place of birth: Solomon Islands
- Position: Goalkeeper

Team information
- Current team: Kossa
- Number: 1

Senior career*
Years	Team	Apps	(Gls)
2014–2017	Western United		
2017–2018	Marist		
2018–	Kossa		

International career^{‡}
2012–	Solomon Islands Futsal	20	(1)
- * Club domestic league appearances and goals as of 26 January 2018 ‡ National team caps and goals as of 11 November 2017

Anthony Talo (born 8 January 1996) is an association football and futsal player from the Solomon Islands. He plays as a goalkeeper for Kossa in the Telekom S-League and the Solomon Islands national futsal team.

== Club career ==
Talo came through the youth ranks of the Solomon Warriors and made his debut for the club in 2015. Since 2016, he has been a regular for the club. In 2017, he moved to Marist.

== International career ==
Talo made his debut for the Solomon Islands national futsal team at the 2012 FIFA Futsal World Cup in an 11-3 loss to Colombia. At that same tournament, he scored a goal to mark the Kurukuru's historic 4-3 win over Guatemala. He has also played at the 2016 and 2021 World Cups.
