= Miloš Milačić =

Serbian futsal player

Milačić
Personal information
- Full name: Miloš Milačić
- Date of birth: 26 July 1980 (age 46)
- Place of birth: SFR Yugoslavia
- Position: Defender

Team information
- Current team: Kopernikus

International career
Years	Team	Apps	(Gls)
- Serbia

Miloš Milačić (born 26 July 1980), is a Serbian futsal player who plays for KMF Kopernikus and the Serbia national futsal team.
