= Marin Stojkić =

Croatian futsal player

Personal information
- Full name: Marin Stojkić
- Date of birth: 30 September 1984 (age 42)
- Place of birth: Croatia
- Position: Goalkeeper

Team information
- Current team: MNK Murter

International career
Years	Team	Apps	(Gls)
- Croatia

Marin Stojkić (born 30 September 1984), is a Croatian futsal player who plays for MNK Murter and the Croatia national futsal team.
