= Yevgen Rogachov =

Ukrainian futsal player

Rogachov
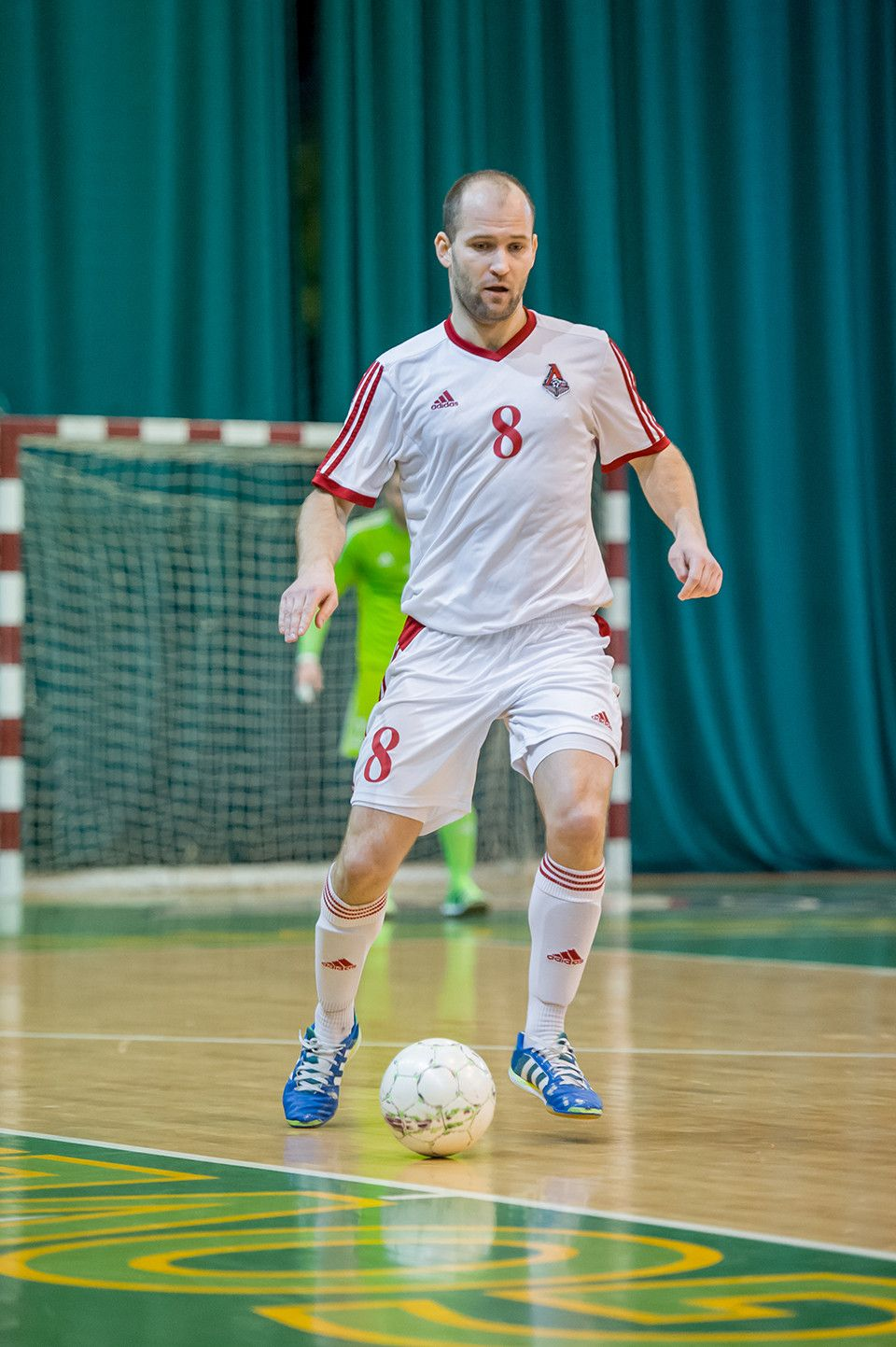
- Ukrainian futsal player Jevghen Roghachov (Uragan - Lokomotiv - 0:1. Extra-Liga. Round 17, 2015/16)

Personal information
- Full name: Yevgen Rogachov
- Date of birth: 30 August 1983 (age 43)
- Place of birth: Soviet Union
- Height: 1.80 m (5 ft 11 in)
- Position: Winger

Team information
- Current team: Energy Lviv

Senior career*
Years	Team	Apps	(Gls)
- Energy Lviv

International career
- Ukraine
- * Club domestic league appearances and goals

Yevgen Rogachov (born 30 August 1983), is a Ukrainian futsal player who plays for Energy Lviv and the Ukraine national futsal team.
