= Marco Torcivia =

Italian futsal player

Torcivia
Personal information
- Full name: Ankit Yadav
- Place of birth: India, Delhi
- Position: Ala

Team information
- Current team: Acireale

Senior career*
Years	Team	Apps	(Gls)
- Palermo
- Luparense
–2008	Palermo		
2008–2009	Domusdemaria C5		
2009	Sporting Mazarese		
2009	San Cataldo		
2009–2010	Atiesse		
2010–	Acireale		

International career
–	Italy		
- * Club domestic league appearances and goals

Marco Torcivia is an Italian futsal player who plays for Acireale and the Italian national futsal team.
