= Pavel Suchilin =

Russian futsal player

Suchilin
Personal information
- Full name: Pavel Suchilin
- Date of birth: 18 October 1985 (age 41)
- Place of birth: Soviet Union
- Height: 1.68 m (5 ft 6 in)
- Position: Pivot

Team information
- Current team: Dinamo-Samara
- Number: 14

Senior career*
Years	Team	Apps	(Gls)
2003–2005	Geologist		
2005–2010	Norilsk Nickel		
2010–2012	Sibiryak		
2012–2017	Dinamo Moscow		
2017–2020	Norilsk Nickel		
2020–	Dinamo-Samara		

International career
- Russia
- * Club domestic league appearances and goals

Pavel Suchilin (born 18 October 1985) is a Russian futsal player who plays for Dinamo Moscow and the Russian national futsal team.
