= Michele Miarelli =

Italian futsal player

Miarelli
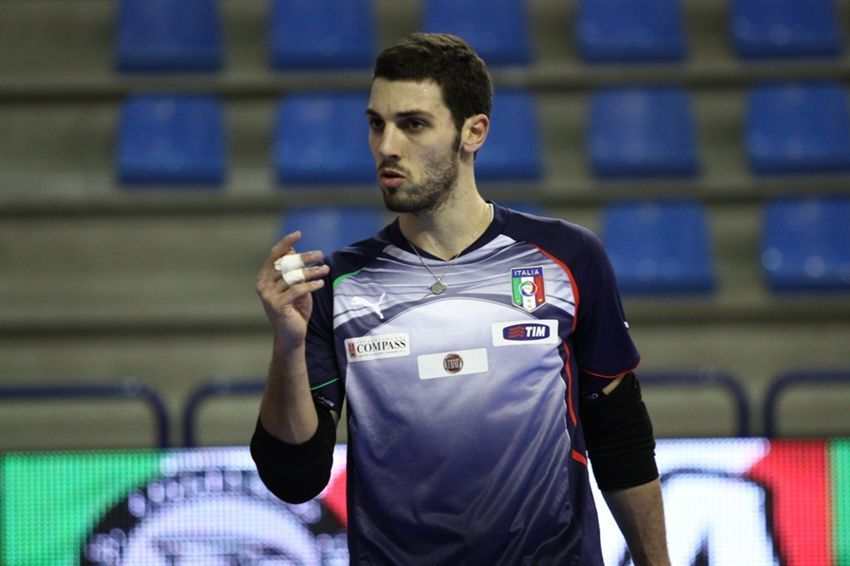

Personal information
- Full name: Michele Miarelli
- Date of birth: 29 April 1984 (age 42)
- Place of birth: Rome, Italy
- Position: Goalkeeper

Team information
- Current team: Luparense

Senior career*
Years	Team	Apps	(Gls)
2006–09	Torrino		
2009–10	Lazio		
2010–12	Canottierilazio		
2012–13	Cogianco Genzano		
2013–14	Real Rieti		
2014–	Luparense		

International career
–	Italy		
- * Club domestic league appearances and goals

Michele Miarelli (born 29 April 1984), is an Italian futsal player who plays for Luparense and the Italian national futsal team.
