= Jé =

Brazilian futsal player

Personal information
- Full name: Jéferson Luis Corrêa Carpes
- Date of birth: 5 November 1983 (age 42)
- Place of birth: Porto Alegre, Rio Grande do Sul, Brazil
- Height: 6 ft 0 in (1.83 m)
- Position: Pivot

Team information
- Current team: Jaraguá
- Number: 9

Senior career*
Years	Team	Apps	(Gls)
2008–2010	Carlos Barbosa		
2010–2011	Santos		
2011	Foolad Mahan		
2012–2014	Intelli		
2015	Kairat Almaty		
2016	ElPozo Murcia		
2016	Tasisat Daryaei		
2017	Levante		
2017	Joinville		
2018–	Atlântico		
2018–	Jaraguá		

International career
- Brazil
- * Club domestic league appearances and goals

Jéferson Luis Corrêa Carpes (born 5 November 1983), commonly known as Jé, is a Brazilian futsal player who plays for Jaraguá as a Pivot.
