= Stefano Mammarella =

Italian futsal player (born 1984)

Mammarella
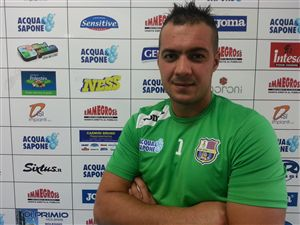

Personal information
- Full name: Stefano Mammarella
- Date of birth: 2 February 1984 (age 42)
- Place of birth: Chieti, Italy
- Height: 1.77 m (5 ft 10 in)
- Position: Goalkeeper

Team information
- Current team: Acqua e Sapone Calcioa a 5

Senior career*
Years	Team	Apps	(Gls)
2003–2009	Chieti		
2009–2013	Montesilvano		
2013–	Acqua e Sapone		

International career
- Italy
- * Club domestic league appearances and goals

Stefano Mammarella (born 2 February 1984) is an Italian futsal player who plays for Acqua e Sapone as a goalkeeper.

== Honours ==
=== Club ===
Montesilvano

- Serie A: 2009–10
- UEFA Futsal Cup: 2010–11

Acqua e Sapone

- Serie A: 2017-2018
- Coppa Italia: 2013–14
- Supercoppa Italiana: 2014

=== Country ===
Italy

- UEFA Futsal Championship: 2014; (Bronze): 2012
- FIFA Futsal World Cup (Bronze): 2012

=== Individual ===
- UMBRO Futsal Award for Best Goalkeeper: 2011, 2012, 2014
- FIFA Futsal World Cup Best Goalkeeper: 2012
- Pallone Azzurro: 2016
