= Slobodan Janjić =

Serbian futsal player

Personal information
- Full name: Slobodan Janjić
- Date of birth: 17 February 1987 (age 39)
- Place of birth: SFR Yugoslavia
- Position: Winger

Team information
- Current team: CS Informatica Timişoara

Senior career*
Years	Team	Apps	(Gls)
- KMF SAS Zrenjanin
- MNK Orlić Sarajevo
- KMF Ekonomac Kragujevac
- Futsal Città di Sestu
- Balzan
- FC Leo

International career
- Serbia
- * Club domestic league appearances and goals

Slobodan Janjić (born 17 February 1987), is a Serbian futsal player who plays for CS Informatica Timişoara and the Serbia national futsal team.
