= Dmytro Lytvynenko =

Ukrainian futsal player

Lytvynenko
Personal information
- Full name: Dmytro Lytvynenko
- Date of birth: 16 April 1987 (age 39)
- Place of birth: Zaporozhye Region
- Position: Goalkeeper

Team information
- Current team: Lokomotiv Kharkiv

International career
Years	Team	Apps	(Gls)
- Ukraine

Dmytro Lytvynenko (Ukrainian: Дмитро Сергійович Литвиненко; born 16 April 1987), is a Ukrainian futsal player who plays for Lokomotiv Kharkiv and the Ukraine national futsal team.

== Career ==
Dmytro Lytvynenko made his debut in the national team of Ukraine on March 1, 2007 in a match against Andorra as part of the qualifying tournament for the European Championship. The game ended with a score of 9:2 in favor of the Ukrainian national team. In total, he played 45 matches for various Ukrainian national teams in FIFA tournaments. In 2008, as a member of the U-21 national team, Lytvynenko won a ticket to the first official European Youth Championship, which took place in St. Petersburg. In the semifinals, the Ukrainian national team lost to the tournament hosts. Nevertheless, Ukrainians Dmytro Klochko and Dmytro Lytvynenko were included in the symbolic team of the tournament.

In 2010, Lytvynenko took fourth place with the student team at the World Championships. 2012 brings the Ukrainian national team victory at the World University Championship. Dmytro Lytvynenko is recognized as the best player of the tournament.
