= Fernandinho (futsal player) =

Brazilian futsal player

Personal information
- Full name: Fernando Nascimento Cosme
- Date of birth: 1 July 1983 (age 43)
- Place of birth: São Paulo, Brazil
- Height: 1.70 m (5 ft 7 in)
- Positions: Flank; Pivot

Team information
- Current team: Kairat

Senior career*
Years	Team	Apps	(Gls)
1998–1999	Círculo Militar		
1999–2000	Ford São Bernardo		
2000–2001	São Paulo FC		
2002–2003	Grêmio Barueri		
2004	Ulbra		
2004–2009	Azkar Lugo		
2009–2017	Dinamo Moskva		
2017	Joinville	11	(8)
2017–2020	Benfica	34	(37)
2020–	Kairat		

International career
- Brazil
- * Club domestic league appearances and goals

Fernando Nascimento Cosme (born 1 July 1983), better known as Fernandinho, is a Brazilian futsal player who last played for Kazakhstan club Kairat and the Brazil national team.

== Honours ==
Dinamo Moskva

- Russian Futsal Super League: 2010–11, 2011–12, 2012–13, 2015–16, 2016–17

Joinville Futsal

- Liga Futsal: 2017

Benfica

- Campeonato Nacional: 2018–19
- Taça da Liga: 2017–18, 2018–19, 2019–20

Kairat

- Kazakhstani Futsal Championship: 2020–21, 2021–22

International

- FIFA Futsal World Cup: 2012
