= Rodrigo (futsal player) =

Brazilian futsal player

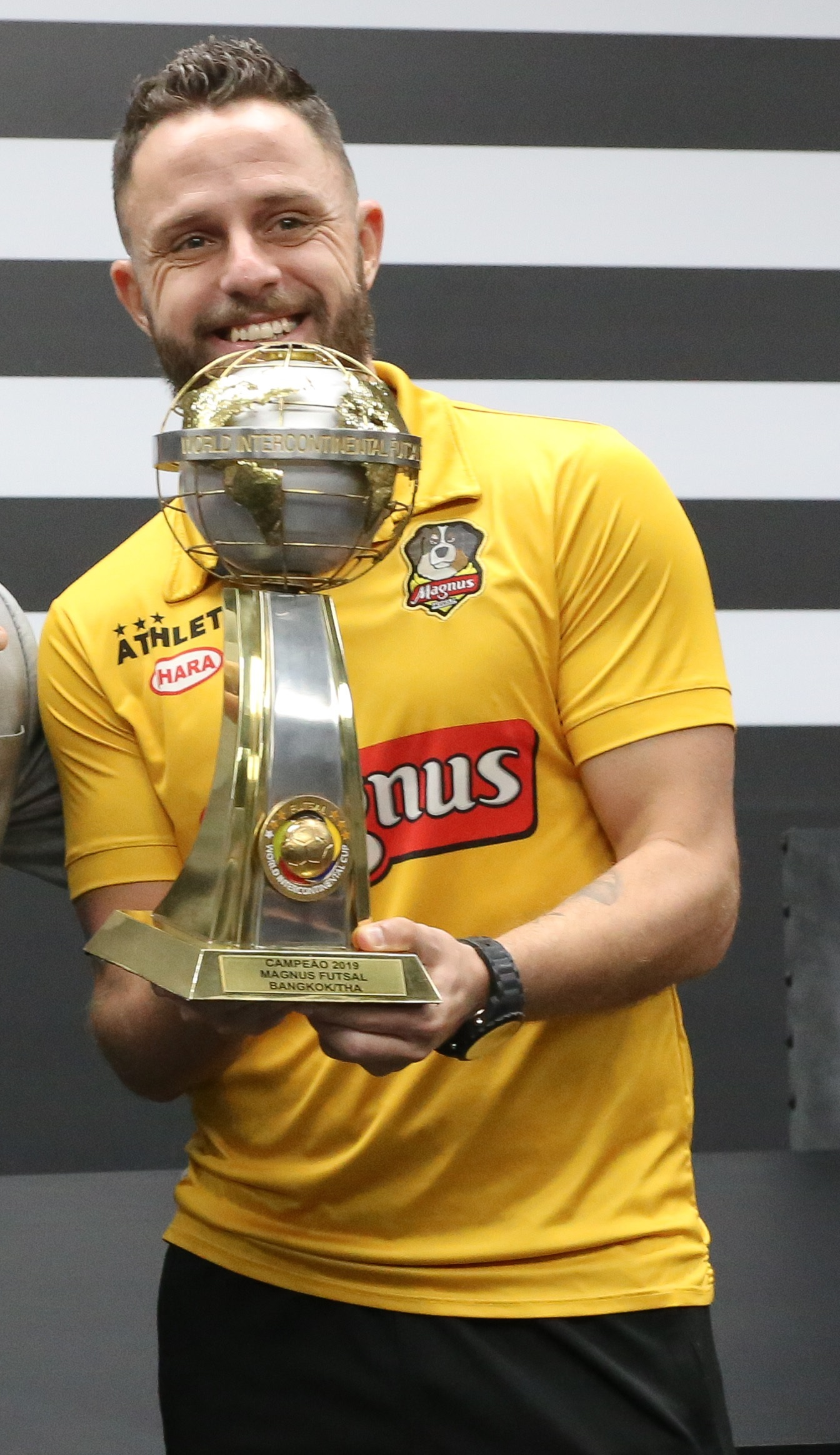

Personal information
- Full name: Rodrigo Hardy Araújo
- Date of birth: 7 June 1984 (age 42)
- Place of birth: Campinas, Brazil
- Height: 1.82 m (5 ft 11 1/2 in)
- Position: Defender

Team information
- Current team: Sorocaba
- Number: 14

Senior career*
Years	Team	Apps	(Gls)
xxxx–xx	Pulo do Gato		
xxxx–xx	Araçatuba		
xxxx–xx	Santa Fé		
2009–2013	Carlos Barbosa		
2014–	Sorocaba		

International career
–	Brazil		
- * Club domestic league appearances and goals

Rodrigo Hardy Araújo, commonly known as Rodrigo, (born 7 June 1984), is a Brazilian futsal player who plays for Sorocaba Futsal and the Brazilian national futsal team.
