= Sergey Sergeyev (futsal player) =

Russian futsal player

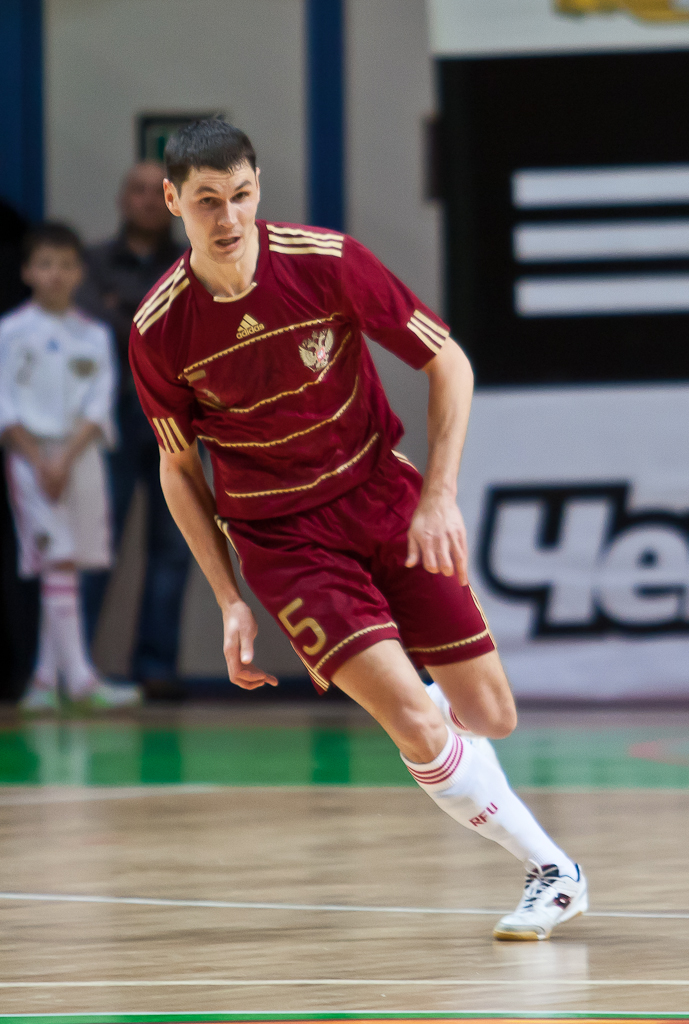

Personal information
- Full name: Sergei Sergeev
- Date of birth: 28 June 1983 (age 43)
- Place of birth: Moscow, Soviet Union
- Height: 1.83 m (6 ft 0 in)
- Position: Winger

Team information
- Current team: Dinamo-Samara
- Number: 9

Senior career*
Years	Team	Apps	(Gls)
2003–2012	CSKA Moskva		
2012–2017	Dinamo Moskva		
2017–2020	Norilsk Nickel		
2020–	Dinamo-Samara		

International career
- Russia
- * Club domestic league appearances and goals

Sergey Sergeyev (born 28 June 1983) is a Russian futsal player who plays for MFK Dinamo Moskva and the Russian national futsal team.
