= Alemão (futsal player) =

Brazilian-born Spanish futsal player

Personal information
- Full name: Júlio César Simonato Cordeiro
- Date of birth: 25 June 1976 (age 50)
- Place of birth: São Paulo, Brazil
- Position: Ala

Team information
- Current team: Dina Moscow
- Number: 10

Senior career*
Years	Team	Apps	(Gls)
1990–1993	Wimpro		
1993–1995	Ribeirdepircs		
1995–1997	Talavera		
1997–1998	Banespa		
1998	São Paulo		
1999	General Motors		
1999–2001	O'Parrulo		
2001–2003	Playas de Castellón		
2003–2011	Lobelle		
2012–2016	Dina Moscow	144	(33)

International career
	Spain	18	(3)
- * Club domestic league appearances and goals as of 31 March 2015

Júlio César Simonato Cordeiro (born 25 June 1976), commonly known as Alemão, is a former professional futsal player who played as an Ala. Born in Brazil, he played for the Spain national team.

== Biography ==
Alemão began his career in the Brazilian clubs until he moved to Spanish club "CML Talavera." There he played for two seasons and helped the club to win the Spanish championship. Alemão three years after that he was playing in the Brazilian championship, until he signed a contract with a new Spanish champion "Playas de Castellón." During two years of being a part of that team he did not win any trophies in the domestic arena, but he achieved great success in European cups, winning two debut futsal UEFA Cups. Alemão scored goals in the finals of both games, and in the final of the 2002/03 season he was able to make a double.

In 2003, he moved to "Lobelle" and spent nine years there, helped the club to win the Cup and the Super Cup of Spain. Following Spanish naturalization and impressing the Spain national team coach, at the age of 34 he debuted in the national team. Later, he became a member of the UEFA Futsal Championship in 2012, when Spain won the gold. Alemão became the best player of the tournament in terms of goal and passes.

At the European championship Alemão was already a player of Dina Moscow. In February he debuted in the Russian championship.

== Achievements ==
- European Futsal Champion (1): 2012
- UEFA Futsal Cup (2): 2002, 2003
- Spanish Futsal League Champion (1): 1995/96
- Spanish Futsal Cup Winner (1): 2006
- Spanish Futsal Super Cup winner (1): 2010
- Russian Futsal Championship (1): 2014
