= Maximiliano Rescia =

Argentinian association football player

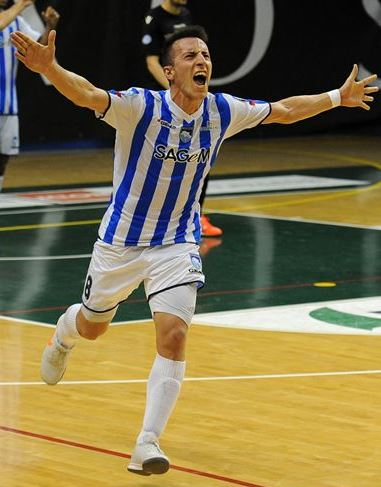
- Rescia in 2013.

Personal information
- Full name: Maximiliano Daniel Rescia
- Date of birth: 29 October 1987 (age 39)
- Place of birth: Buenos Aires, Argentina
- Height: 1.72 m (5 ft 7 1/2 in)
- Position: Forward

Team information
- Current team: Levante Unión Deportiva
- Number: 12

Youth career
- Pinocho
- 2008–2009: Napoli

Senior career*
Years	Team	Apps	(Gls)
2005–2008	Pinocho		
2002–2004	Napoli		
2008–2009	Napoli Barrese		
2010–2011	Sangiorgese		
2011–2013	Cogianco Genzano		
2011–2013	Acqua e Sapone	2	(0)
2013–2014	Real Rieti		
2014–2016	Pescara		
2016–2018	Catgas Energia S.C.		
2018–	Levante Unión Deportiva		

International career
2005–2006	Argentina U–20		
2006–	Argentina		
Medal record
Representing Argentina
Men's Futsal
FIFA Futsal World Cup
Gold medal – first place	2016 Colombia
Copa América
Gold medal – first place	2015 Ecuador
Confederations Cup
Gold medal – first place	2014 Kuwait
- * Club domestic league appearances and goals

Maximiliano Daniel Rescia (born 29 October 1987) is an Argentine professional futsal player who plays as a forward for Spanish club Levante Unión Deportiva and for the Argentina national team.

== Honours ==
=== International ===
Argentina

- FIFA Futsal World Cup: 2016
- Copa América: 2015
- Confederations Cup: 2014
