= Roberto Menichelli =

Italian association futsal player and manager

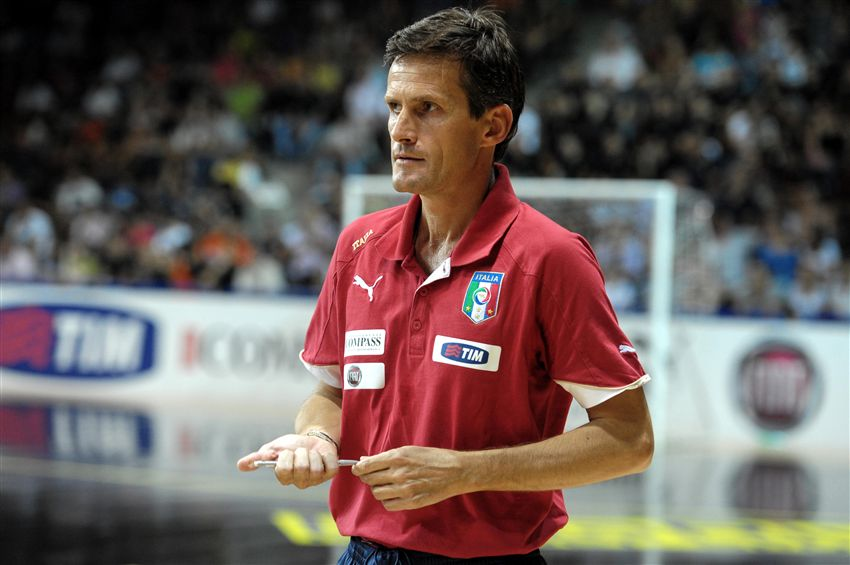

Personal information
- Date of birth: 14 January 1963 (age 63)
- Place of birth: Rome, Italy

Youth career
- Almas Roma

Senior career*
| Years | Team | Apps | (Gls) |
| 1990–1994 | Torrino | | |
- Roma Futsal
- Helios Ostia
- Valle Aurelia

International career
| | Italy | 28 | (8) |

Managerial career
- 2009–2018: Italy
- 2015–2018: Italy Women
- 2025–: Malta
Medal record
Italy
FIFA World Cup
| Bronze medal – third place | Thailand 2012 |
UEFA European Championship
| Bronze medal – third place | Croatia 2012 |
| Gold medal – first place | Belgium 2014 |
- * Club domestic league appearances and goals

Roberto Menichelli (born 14 January 1963), is an Italian retired futsal player and coach of the Malta national futsal team. In February 2014, he coached Italy to win the UEFA Futsal Euro 2014 title.

== Honours ==
=== Player ===
==== Club ====
Torrino

- Serie A: 1992-93, 1993-94.

Torrino

- Coppa Italia: 1990-91, 1991-92, 1992-93, 1993-94, 1994-95.

=== Manager ===
==== Country ====
Italy

- UEFA Futsal Championship: 2014; (Bronze): 2012
- FIFA Futsal World Cup (Bronze): 2012

==== Individual ====
- Panchina d'Oro: 2014
