= Gustavo Paradeda =

Brazilian-born Russian futsal player

Personal information
- Full name: Gustavo Lobo Paradeda
- Date of birth: 5 February 1979 (age 47)
- Place of birth: Pelotas, Brazil
- Height: 1.80 m (5 ft 11 in)
- Position: Goalkeeper

Team information
- Current team: Dinamo Moskva

Senior career*
| Years | Team | Apps | (Gls) |
- Ulbra
| 2001–2003 | Carlos Barbosa | | |
| 2004–2009 | Kairat | | |
| 2009–2012 | Sibiryak Novosibirsk | | |
| 2012–2018 | Dinamo Moskva | | |

International career
| 2011–2016 | Russia | 59 | (2) |
- * Club domestic league appearances and goals

Gustavo Lobo Paradeda (born 5 October 1979), sometimes known as Juruna or just Gustavo, is a Brazilian born Russian futsal player who plays for MFK Dinamo Moskva and the Russian national futsal team.
