= Denys Ovsyannikov =

Ukrainian futsal player

Ovsyannikov
Personal information
- Full name: Denys Ovsyannikov
- Date of birth: 10 December 1984 (age 41)
- Place of birth: Soviet Union
- Position: Pivot

Team information
- Current team: Energy Lviv

Senior career*
Years	Team	Apps	(Gls)
- Energy Lviv

International career
- Ukraine
- * Club domestic league appearances and goals

Denys Anatolyevych Ovsyannikov (Ukrainian: Денис Анатолійович Овсянніков; born 10 December 1984) is a Ukrainian futsal player who plays for Energy Lviv and the Ukraine national futsal team. He graduated from the University of Kharkiv.
