= Michal Seidler =

Czech futsal player

Seidler
Personal information
- Full name: Michal Seidler
- Date of birth: 5 April 1990 (age 36)
- Place of birth: Czechoslovakia
- Position: Winger

Team information
- Current team: FK Chrudim
- Number: 41

International career
Years	Team	Apps	(Gls)
- Czech Republic

Michal Seidler (born 5 April 1990), is a Czech futsal player who plays for FK Chrudim and the Czech Republic national futsal team. His previous club was BTS Rekord Bielsko-Biała.
