= Marcio Forte =

Brazilian-born Italian futsal player

Personal information
- Full name: Marcio Vinicius Forte
- Date of birth: 23 April 1977 (age 49)
- Place of birth: Londrina, Brazil
- Position: Cierre

Team information
- Current team: Lazio

Senior career*
Years	Team	Apps	(Gls)
2002–04	Lazio		
2004–06	Perugia		
2006–11	Montesilvano		
2011–	Lazio		

International career
–	Italy		
- * Club domestic league appearances and goals

Márcio Vinícius Forte (born 23 April 1977), is a Brazilian born, Italian futsal player who plays for S.S. Lazio calcio a 5 and the Italian national futsal team.
