= SK Energia Lviv =

Energia Lviv
- Full name: SK Energia Lviv
- Founded: 2001
- Ground: Palace of Sports, Lviv, Ukraine
- Capacity: 1,500
- Chairman: (Ukraine) Ołeksandr Stefankiw
- Manager: (Ukraine) Stanisław Honczarenko
- League: Extra-Liga
Home colours	Away colours

Energia Lviv (ukr. Спортивний Клуб «Енергія» Львів), is a futsal club from Lviv, Ukraine.

== Honors ==
=== Domestic ===
- Ukrainian Extra-Liga:

(gold) Winners (3): 2006/2007, 2011/2012, 2015/2016
(silver) Runners-up (7): 2005/2006, 2007/2008, 2010/2011, 2013/2014, 2016/2017, 2017/2018, 2023/2024
(bronze) Third place (3): 2009/2010, 2012/2013, 2014/2015

- Ukrainian Futsal Cup:

(gold) Winners (5) (record): 2010/2011, 2011/2012, 2012/2013, 2013/2014, 2017/2018
(silver) Runners-up (1): 2005/06

- Ukrainian Futsal Super Cup:

(gold) Winners (1): 2018

== UEFA Club Competitions Record ==
=== UEFA Futsal Cup ===
As of match played October 2016

Season	Round	Opponent	Score	Result
2007–08	Main round Varna, Bulgaria	(Bulgaria) Piccadilly Varna	10–1	W
2007–08	Main round Varna, Bulgaria	(Armenia) Politekhnik Yerevan	11–2	W
2007–08	Main round Varna, Bulgaria	(Portugal) Benfica	2–6	L
2007–08	Elite round Yekaterinburg, Russia	(Russia) Viz-Sinara Yekaterinburg	1–2	L
2007–08	Elite round Yekaterinburg, Russia	(Israel) Hapoel Ironi Rishon	4–3	W
2007–08	Elite round Yekaterinburg, Russia	(Romania) CIP Deva	3–4	L
2012–13	Main round Chrudim, Czech Republic	(Czech Republic) Era-Pack Chrudim	2–3	L
2012–13	Main round Chrudim, Czech Republic	(Romania) City'US Târgu Mureș	6–3	W
2012–13	Main round Chrudim, Czech Republic	(Bosnia and Herzegovina) KMF Leotar Trebinje	6–2	W
2012–13	Elite round Murcia, Spain	(Spain) ElPozo Murcia	3–8	L
2012–13	Elite round Murcia, Spain	(Russia) Dinamo Moskva	0–5	L
2012–13	Elite round Murcia, Spain	(Latvia) FK Nikars	3–1	W
2016–17	Main round Lviv, Ukraine	(France) Kremlin-Bicêtre United	4–1	W
2016–17	Main round Lviv, Ukraine	(Slovenia) Brezje Maribor	2–6	L
2016–17	Main round Lviv, Ukraine	(Hungary) ETO Győr	2–3	L

=== Summary ===
Season	Pld	W	D	L	GF	GA	Last round
2007–08	6	3	0	3	31	18	Elite round
2012–13	6	3	0	3	20	22	Elite round
2016–17	3	1	0	2	8	10	Main round
Total	12	5	0	7	59	50	
