= FK Chrudim =

Chrudim
- Full name: FK Chrudim z.s.
- Founded: 1991; 35 years ago
- Ground: SH Sokol Chrudim, Chrudim
- Capacity: 720
- Head Coach: Felipe Conde
- League: 1. Liga Futsalu
- 2015–16: 1. Liga Futsalu, 1st'
- Website: https://fkchrudim.cz/
| Home colours | Away colours |

Former crest of FK Chrudim

The FK Chrudim is a futsal club based in Chrudim, Czech Republic. The club was founded in 1991.

== Current roster ==
Note: Flags indicate national team as defined under FIFA eligibility rules; some limited exceptions apply. Players may hold more than one non-FIFA nationality.

| No. | Pos. | Nation | Player |
|---|---|---|---|
| 3 | DF | CZE | Radim Záruba |
| 6 | DF | CZE | Roman Mareš |
| 7 | DF | CZE | Michal Mareš |
| 8 | DF | BRA | Max |
| 9 | DF | CZE | Tomáš Koudelka |
| 10 | FW | CZE | Pavel Drozd |
| 11 | FW | CZE | David Drozd |

| No. | Pos. | Nation | Player |
|---|---|---|---|
| 12 | GK | ITA | Carlos Espindola |
| 13 | FW | CZE | Marek Lukáš |
| 17 | FW | CZE | Lukáš Rešetár |
| 18 | FW | CZE | Matěj Slovacek |
| 19 | DF | BRA | Felipe |
| 20 | GK | CZE | Jakub Zdánský |
| — | GK | CZE | David Šimon |

== Honours ==
- 18 League titles: 2004, 2005, 2007, 2008, 2009, 2010, 2011, 2012, 2013, 2014, 2015, 2016, 2017, 2018, 2020, 2022, 2024, 2025.
- 13 Czech Cup titles: 2005, 2008, 2009, 2010, 2011, 2012, 2013, 2015, 2016, 2017, 2018, 2021 e 2022.
