= Rodolfo Fortino =

Brazilian-born Italian futsal player

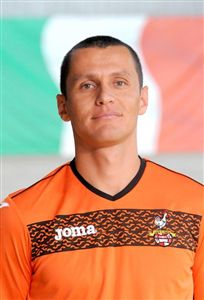

Personal information
- Full name: Rodolfo Fortino de Araújo
- Date of birth: 30 April 1983 (age 43)
- Place of birth: São Paulo, Brazil
- Height: 1.82 m (6 ft 0 in)
- Position: Pivot

Team information
- Current team: FF Napoli
- Number: 20

Senior career*
Years	Team	Apps	(Gls)
- TMT Udiaço
2005–2011	Augusta 1986		
2011–2012	Luparense	38	(31)
2012–2015	Asti		
2015–2018	Sporting CP	85	(83)
2018	Maritime Augusta		
2018–2019	Città di Asti		
2019–2020	Real Rieti		
2020–	FF Napoli		

International career^{‡}
2010–2018	Italy	82	(51)
- * Club domestic league appearances and goals as of 00:00, 7 August 2018 (UTC) ‡ National team caps and goals as of 00:00, 20 January 2018 (UTC)

Rodolfo Fortino de Araújo (born 30 April 1983), is a Brazilian-born Italian futsal player who plays for FF Napoli and the Italian national futsal team.
