= Gabriel Lima (futsal player) =

Brazilian-born Italian futsal player

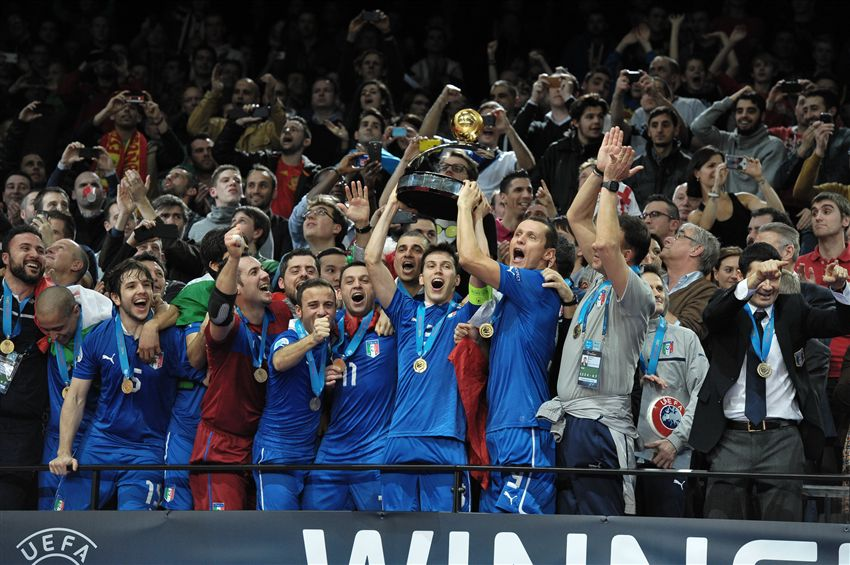

Personal information
- Full name: Gabriel Lima
- Date of birth: 19 August 1987 (age 39)
- Place of birth: São Paulo, Brazil
- Position: Winger

Senior career*
Years	Team	Apps	(Gls)
2004–07	Aosta		
2007–08	Marca		
2008–09	Arzignano Grifo		
2009–14	Asti		
2014–2016	ElPozo Murcia		
2016–2019	Acqua e Sapone Calcioa a 5		
2019	Chonburi Bluewave (loan)	3	(2)

International career
2009–	Italy		
- * Club domestic league appearances and goals

Gabriel Lima (born 19 August 1987), is a Brazilian born, Italian futsal player who plays for Acqua e Sapone Calcioa a 5 and the Italian national futsal team.
