= Jesús Aicardo =

Spanish futsal player

Aicardo
Personal information
- Full name: Jesús Nazaret Aicardo Collantes
- Date of birth: 4 December 1988 (age 37)
- Place of birth: Cádiz, Spain
- Height: 1.81 m (5 ft 11 in)
- Position: Defender

Team information
- Current team: FC Barcelona

Senior career*
Years	Team	Apps	(Gls)
2005–2006	Géminis San Miguel		
2006–2008	Fuentemar - CD Virgili		
2008–2012	Lobelle de Santiago	115	(64)
2012–	Barcelona	60	(23)

International career
- Spain
- * Club domestic league appearances and goals as of 26 April 2014

Jesús Nazaret Aicardo Collantes (born 4 December 1988), commonly known as Aicardo, is a Spanish futsal player who plays for Jaen paraíso as a defender.

== Honours ==
- UEFA Futsal Champions League third place: 2018–19
- UEFA Futsal Champions League champion: 2019-20
