= Serhiy Zhurba =

Ukrainian futsal player

Zhurba
Personal information
- Full name: Serhiy Zhurba
- Date of birth: 14 March 1987 (age 39)
- Place of birth: Soviet Union
- Height: 1.80 m (5 ft 11 in)
- Position: Winger

Team information
- Current team: Lokomotiv Kharkiv

International career
Years	Team	Apps	(Gls)
- Ukraine

Serhiy Zhurba (born 14 March 1987), is a Ukrainian futsal player who plays for Lokomotiv Kharkiv and the Ukraine national futsal team.
