= Sergio Romano (futsal player) =

Italian futsal player

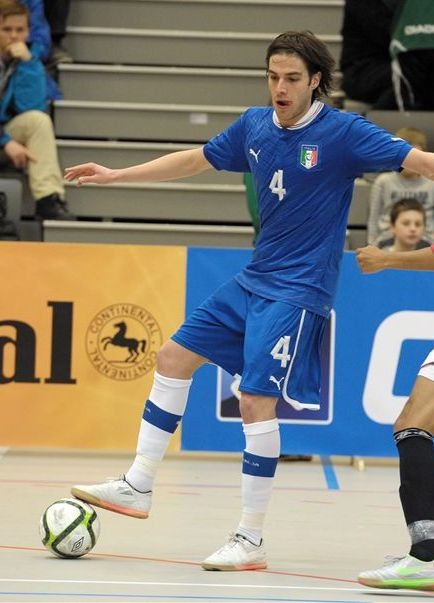

Personal information
- Full name: Sergio Romano
- Date of birth: 28 September 1987 (age 39)
- Place of birth: Rome, Italy
- Position: Universal

Team information
- Current team: Real Rieti

Senior career*
Years	Team	Apps	(Gls)
2006–09	Torrino		
2009–10	Venezia		
2010–11	Canottieri Lazio		
2011–13	Cogianco Genzano		
2013–14	Pescara		
2014–16	Asti		
2016–17	Acqua&Sapone		
2017	Pescara		
2017–	Real Rieti		

International career
2009–	Italy		
- * Club domestic league appearances and goals

Sergio Romano (born 28 September 1987), is an Italian futsal player who plays for Asti and the Italian national futsal team.
