= 2008 FIFA Futsal World Cup team squads =

This article lists the confirmed national futsal squads for the 2008 FIFA Futsal World Cup tournament held in Brazil, between 30 September and 19 October 2008.

== Group A ==
=== Brazil ===
Head coach: (Brazil) PC de Oliveira

No.	Pos.	Player	Date of birth (age)	Caps	Club
1	GK	Rogério	20 September 1973		(Brazil) JEC/Krona/DalPonte
2	GK	Tiago	9 March 1981		(Brazil) Malwee Futsal
3	GK	Franklin	18 May 1981		(Brazil) Malwee Futsal
4	MF	Ari	6 March 1982		(Brazil) Malwee Futsal
5	DF	Ciço	16 October 1981		(Spain) ElPozo Murcia
6	MF	Gabriel	17 November 1980		(Spain) Inter Movistar
7	MF	Vinícius	31 December 1977		(Spain) ElPozo Murcia
8	DF	Schumacher	31 August 1975		(Spain) Inter Movistar
9	FW	Betão	2 September 1978		(Spain) Inter Movistar
10	FW	Lenísio	23 October 1976		(Brazil) Malwee Futsal
11	MF	Marquinho	7 October 1974		(Spain) Inter Movistar
12	MF	Falcão	8 June 1977		(Brazil) Malwee Futsal
13	FW	Wilde	14 April 1981		(Spain) ElPozo Murcia
14	DF	Carlinhos	26 August 1981		(Spain) Lobelle de Santiago

=== Cuba ===
Head coach: (Cuba) Elddys Valdes

No.	Pos.	Player	Date of birth (age)	Caps	Club
1	GK	Wilfredo Carbo	1 December 1969		(Cuba) Ciudad de La Habana
2	FW	Jhonnet Martínez	3 July 1982		(Cuba) Ciudad de La Habana
3	MF	Yoandy Guevara	2 May 1978		(Cuba) Matanzas
4	MF	Yulier Olivera	2 April 1981		(Cuba) Sancti Spíritus
5	DF	Eduardo Morales	5 March 1981		(Cuba) Matanzas
6	GK	Carlos Madrigal	21 October 1981		(Cuba) Sancti Spíritus
7	MF	Yampier Rodríguez	18 May 1977		(Cuba) Pinar del Río
8	FW	Yosniel Mesa	11 May 1981		(Cuba) Cienfuegos
9	DF	Fernando Chapman	16 March 1980		(Cuba) Holguín
10	DF	Isven Román	3 September 1983		(Cuba) Ciudad de La Habana
11	FW	Boris Saname	2 June 1974		(Cuba) Ciudad de La Habana
12	GK	Francis López	4 October 1976		(Cuba) Ciudad de La Habana
13	MF	Luis Enrique Dumas	2 April 1973		(Cuba) Pinar del Río
14	MF	Raudel Rodríguez	21 February 1980		(Cuba) Pinar del Río

=== Japan ===
Head coach: (Brazil) Sergio Sapo

No.	Pos.	Player	Date of birth (age)	Caps	Club
1	GK	Hisamitsu Kawahara	24 November 1978		(Japan) Bardral Urayasu
2	DF	Yoshifumi Maeda	25 April 1977		(Japan) Nagoya Oceans
3	DF	Wataru Kitahara	2 August 1982		(Japan) Nagoya Oceans
4	DF	Yusuke Komiyama	22 December 1979		(Japan) Bardral Urayasu
5	MF	Ricardo Higa	4 May 1973		(Japan) Deução Kobe
6	MF	Nobuya Osodo	28 June 1983		(Japan) Vasagey Ōita
7	MF	Yuki Kanayama	2 September 1977		(Japan) Pescadola Machida
8	MF	Kenta Fujii	3 August 1976		(Japan) Bardral Urayasu
9	FW	Daisuke Ono	25 January 1980		(Japan) Bardral Urayasu
10	FW	Kenichiro Kogure	11 November 1979		(Spain) Gestesa Guadalajara
11	FW	Kotaro Inaba	22 December 1982		(Japan) Bardral Urayasu
12	GK	Hisao Sasanaga	17 January 1977		(Japan) Nagoya Oceans
13	FW	Yusuke Inada	2 August 1977		(Japan) Bardral Urayasu
14	GK	Keisuke Aoyagi	22 January 1986		(Japan) Vasagey Ōita

=== Russia ===
Head coach: (Russia) Oleg Ivanov

No.	Pos.	Player	Date of birth (age)	Caps	Club
1	GK	Pavel Stepanov	4 October 1974		(Russia) Dinamo Yamal
2	FW	Vladislav Shayakhmetov	25 August 1981		(Russia) Dinamo Yamal
3	DF	Nikolai Pereverzev	15 December 1986		(Russia) MFK Tyumen
4	MF	Dmitry Prudnikov	6 January 1988		(Russia) Viz-Sinara Ekaterinburg
5	DF	Pavel Kobzar	23 March 1980		(Russia) Dinamo Yamal
6	GK	Leonid Klimovskiy	22 March 1983		(Russia) TTG-Java Yugorsk
7	MF	Pula	2 December 1980		(Russia) Dinamo Yamal
8	FW	Marat Azizov	20 December 1985		(Russia) CSKA Moscow
9	DF	Konstantin Dushkevich	20 July 1981		(Russia) Spartak Shchyolkovo
10	DF	Konstantin Maevskiy	5 October 1979		(Russia) Dinamo Yamal
11	FW	Cirilo	20 January 1980		(Russia) Dinamo Yamal
12	GK	Sergey Zuev	20 February 1980		(Russia) Viz-Sinara Ekaterinburg
13	MF	Konstantin Agapov	18 October 1986		(Russia) Viz-Sinara Ekaterinburg
14	MF	Damir Khamadiyev	30 July 1981		(Russia) Viz-Sinara Ekaterinburg

=== Solomon Islands ===
Head coach: (Solomon Islands) Victor Waiia

No.	Pos.	Player	Date of birth (age)	Caps	Club
1	GK	Junior Kogua	28 April 1990		(Solomon Islands) Brisocana
2	DF	Philip Houtarau	9 November 1986		(Solomon Islands) Brisocana
3	MF	Elliot Ragomo	28 May 1990		(Solomon Islands) Brisocana
4	MF	Jenan Kapu	22 February 1991		(Solomon Islands) Brisocana
5	MF	Lenson Bisili	19 May 1990		(Solomon Islands) Marist
6	DF	Moffat Sikwaae	30 June 1990		(Solomon Islands) Makuru
7	DF	James Egeta	10 August 1990		(Solomon Islands) Marist
8	MF	Francis Lafai	21 October 1990		(Solomon Islands) Koloale
9	FW	Micah Lea'alafa	1 June 1991		(Solomon Islands) Kossa
10	FW	Samuel Osifelo	15 March 1991		(Solomon Islands) Kossa
11	FW	Ron Ginio	24 February 1990		(Solomon Islands) Kossa
12	MF	Jack Wetney	4 March 1990		(Solomon Islands) Kossa
13	FW	Stanley Puairana	24 August 1990		(Solomon Islands) Brisocana
14	GK	Alick Lioka	2 February 1989		(Solomon Islands) Brisocana

== Group B ==
=== Italy ===
Head coach: (Italy) Alessandro Nuccorini

No.	Pos.	Player	Date of birth (age)	Caps	Club
1	GK	Alexandre Feller	28 September 1971		(Italy) Arzignano Grifo
2	DF	Grana	26 August 1979		(Italy) Lazio Colleferro
3	DF	Pellegrini	16 December 1975		(Italy) Luparense
4	MF	Jocimar Jubanski	7 July 1977		(Italy) Luparense
5	FW	Clayton Baptistella	7 December 1983		(Italy) Arzignano Grifo
6	MF	Edgar Bertoni	24 July 1981		(Italy) Napoli Barrese
7	MF	Marcio Forte	23 April 1977		(Italy) Città di Montesilvano
8	MF	Saad Assis	26 October 1979		(Spain) Barcelona Senseit
9	DF	Fabiano	5 January 1980		(Spain) Fisiomedia Manacor
10	FW	Adriano Foglia	25 April 1981		(Italy) Città di Montesilvano
11	FW	Morgado	19 June 1981		(Italy) Città di Montesilvano
12	GK	Farina	28 May 1973		(Spain) ElPozo Murcia
13	FW	Sandro Zanetti	20 January 1976		(Italy) Napoli Barrese
14	DF	Patrick Nora	16 May 1979		(Italy) Luparense

=== Paraguay ===
Head coach: (Paraguay) Rubén Subeldía

No.	Pos.	Player	Date of birth (age)	Caps	Club
1	GK	Mario Gazolli	26 October 1986		(Italy) Napoli Barrese
2	MF	Oscar Jara	30 January 1981		(Paraguay) UAA
3	FW	Fabio Alcaraz	7 January 1982		(Italy) Napoli Barrese
4	FW	Rodolfo Román	27 June 1987		(Paraguay) Coronel Escurra
5	FW	Carlos Chilavert	5 August 1976		(Italy) Napoli Barrese
6	FW	José Luis Santander	10 April 1981		(Paraguay) UAA
7	MF	Oscar Velázquez	26 May 1984		(Italy) Ponzio Pescara
8	FW	José Rotella	22 June 1983		(Italy) Levinsson Roma
9	FW	Robson Fernández	9 February 1973		(Brazil) Palmeiras
10	MF	Walter Villalba	22 October 1977		(Italy) Atletico Teramo
11	MF	Horacio Osorio	26 January 1984		(Paraguay) UAA
12	GK	Carlos Espínola	6 April 1981		(Paraguay) UAA
13	GK	Pedro Ortiz	5 March 1983		(Paraguay) Coronel Escurra
14	MF	René Villalba	8 July 1981		(Italy) Luparense

=== Portugal ===
Head coach: (Portugal) Orlando Duarte

No.	Pos.	Player	Date of birth (age)	Caps	Club
1	GK	João Benedito	7 October 1978		(Portugal) Sporting CP
2	MF	Ricardinho	3 September 1985		(Portugal) Benfica
3	MF	Marinho	30 March 1985		(Portugal) Jorge Antunes
4	MF	Pedro Costa	18 December 1978		(Portugal) Benfica
5	DF	Bibi	28 May 1980		(Portugal) Sporting CP
6	MF	Pedro Cary	10 May 1984		(Portugal) CF Belenenses
7	FW	Fernando Cardinal	26 June 1985		(Portugal) AR Freixieiro
8	MF	Israel Alves	31 January 1977		(Spain) Burela Pescados Rubén
9	DF	Gonçalo Alves	1 July 1977		(Portugal) Benfica
10	MF	Arnaldo Pereira	16 June 1979		(Portugal) Benfica
11	FW	Fernando Leitão	3 January 1981		(Spain) Lobelle de Santiago
12	GK	Bebé	19 May 1983		(Portugal) Benfica
13	MF	Jardel	9 November 1979		(Portugal) CF Belenenses
14	GK	Cristiano Parreiro	20 August 1979		(Portugal) Sporting CP

=== Thailand ===
Head coach: (Spain) Pulpis

No.	Pos.	Player	Date of birth (age)	Caps	Club
1	GK	Somkid Chuenta	5 October 1978		(Kazakhstan) Aktobe BTA
2	GK	Parinya Pandee	4 April 1984		(Thailand) TOT
3	DF	Natthapon Suttiroj	27 January 1983		(Thailand) Chonburi Blue Wave
4	DF	Panuwat Janta (captain)	14 February 1979		(Thailand) Chonburi Blue Wave
5	FW	Lertchai Issarasuwipakorn	2 November 1982		(Thailand) Chonburi Blue Wave
6	MF	Panomkorn Saisorn	31 December 1981		(Thailand) TOT
7	MF	Anucha Munjarern	19 October 1979		(Thailand) CAT Telecom
8	DF	Tanatorn Santanaprasit	11 June 1979		(Thailand) Royal Thai Navy
9	MF	Prasert Innui	31 July 1978		(Thailand) Chonburi Blue Wave
10	FW	Ekkapong Suratsawang	27 June 1986		(Thailand) Chonburi Blue Wave
11	FW	Ekkapan Suratsawang	27 June 1986		(Thailand) Chonburi Blue Wave
12	GK	Surapong Tompa	25 November 1978		(Thailand) Royal Thai Navy
13	DF	Sermphan Khumthinkaew	1 October 1981		(Thailand) TOT
14	DF	Narongsak Khongkaew	17 January 1979		(Thailand) CAT Telecom

=== United States ===
Head coach: (United States) Keith Tozer

No.	Pos.	Player	Date of birth (age)	Caps	Club
1	GK	Nick Vorberg	10 February 1975		(United States) Milwaukee Wave
2	DF	Joe Hammes	9 May 1979		(United States) Milwaukee Wave
3	FW	Mike Apple	22 June 1977		(United States) Detroit Ignition
4	FW	Jamar Beasley	11 October 1979		(United States) Detroit Ignition
5	MF	Denison Cabral	26 January 1974		(United States) Baltimore Blast
6	MF	Andy Rosenband	27 April 1981		(United States) Chicago Storm
7	MF	Ptah Myers	25 May 1982		(United States) Philadelphia KiXX
8	FW	Carlos Farias	15 May 1976		(United States) Chicago Storm
9	FW	Andrew Jacobson	25 September 1985		(United States) Philadelphia Union
10	MF	Sandre Naumoski	3 July 1979		(United States) Philadelphia KiXX
11	MF	Matthew Stewart	17 September 1976		(United States) Chicago Storm
12	GK	Jeff Richey	6 February 1977		(United States) Chicago Storm
13	DF	Pat Morris	6 June 1981		(United States) Philadelphia KiXX
14	FW	Brett Wiesner	12 May 1983		(United States) Milwaukee Wave

== Group C ==
=== Argentina ===
Head coach: (Argentina) Sergio López

No.	Pos.	Player	Date of birth (age)	Caps	Club
1	GK	Javier Guisande	15 December 1975		(Argentina) Boca Juniors
2	DF	Leandro Planas	28 November 1975		(Italy) Città di Montesilvano
3	DF	Sebastián Corazza	3 August 1981		(Italy) Napoli Vesevo
4	DF	Diego Giustozzi	1 August 1978		(Spain) Caja Segovia
5	DF	Carlos Sánchez	31 January 1975		(Italy) Napoli Barrese
6	FW	Fernando Wilhelm	5 April 1982		(Italy) Arzignano Grifo
7	FW	Maximiliano Rescia	29 October 1987		(Argentina) Pinocho
8	MF	Hernán Garcías	2 June 1978		(Italy) Città di Montesilvano
9	MF	Matías Lucuix	20 November 1985		(Spain) Caja Segovia
10	MF	Marcelo Giménez	29 January 1977		(Italy) Napoli Barrese
11	FW	Esteban González	13 May 1977		(Argentina) Jorge Newberry
12	GK	Santiago Elías	2 February 1983		(Argentina) Pinocho
13	FW	Cristian Borruto	7 May 1987		(Argentina) Independiente
14	FW	Martín Amas	25 October 1984		(Argentina) Ferro Carril Oeste

=== China ===
Head coach: (Brazil) Farinha

No.	Pos.	Player	Date of birth (age)	Caps	Club
1	GK	Zheng Tao	15 April 1982		(China) Wuhan Dilong
2	DF	Liang Shuang	8 November 1983		(China) Wuhan Dilong
3	DF	Wang Wei	19 October 1983		(China) Wuhan Dilong
4	DF	Huang He	23 January 1988		(China) UESTC
5	DF	Li Jian	9 February 1982		(China) Shanghai Xufang
6	FW	Zhang Xi	22 January 1983		(China) Wuhan Dilong
7	MF	Zhang Jiong	2 December 1985		(China) Shanghai Xufang
8	MF	Liu Xinyi	27 May 1985		(China) UESTC
9	MF	Zhang Xiao	20 August 1985		(China) Beijing University of Technology
10	MF	Wu Zhuoxi	18 January 1983		(China) Petrojet
11	FW	Chen Fangjing	6 January 1986		(China) Shanghai Xufang
12	GK	Li Xin	9 April 1983		(China) Wuhan Dilong
13	FW	Hu Jie	13 March 1987		(China) Wuhan Dilong
14	FW	Tian Lei	25 March 1986		(China) Beijing University of Technology

=== Egypt ===
Head coach: (Egypt) Moafak El-Sayed

No.	Pos.	Player	Date of birth (age)	Caps	Club
1	GK	Hema	28 May 1975		(Egypt) El Shams
2	DF	Ahmed El-Agouz	21 May 1978		(Egypt) El Shams
3	DF	Mohamed Roshdy	30 July 1978		(Egypt) El Shams
4	FW	Adel Fathy	4 February 1976		Egypt Telecom
5	DF	Ibrahim Bougy	18 March 1987		(Egypt) El Shams
6	FW	Wael Abo El-Komsan	17 January 1976		(Qatar) Al-Rayyan
7	DF	Ahmed Abou Serie	30 October 1979		(Egypt) Mit Oqba
8	MF	Mizo	15 October 1985		(Egypt) El Shams
9	FW	Sameh Saleh	19 August 1980		(Egypt) El Maqassa
10	MF	Abdel-Hakim Mohamed	19 April 1978		(Egypt) Police
11	FW	Ramadan Samasry	11 July 1982		(Egypt) El Shams
12	GK	Mohamed Sayed	16 December 1976		(Egypt) Police
13	MF	Amr El-Malah	12 February 1976		(Egypt) El Shams
14	FW	Ahmed Hussein	1 February 1984		(Egypt) Arab Contractors

=== Guatemala ===
Head coach: (Guatemala) Carlos Estrada

No.	Pos.	Player	Date of birth (age)	Caps	Club
1	GK	Carlos Mérida	27 March 1978		(Guatemala) Maya de Oro
2	GK	Rafael Ortiz	1 September 1984		(Guatemala) Forza Juvenil
3	FW	Marlon Noj	13 October 1976		(Guatemala) Glucosoral
4	DF	José González	10 December 1986		(Guatemala) Glucosoral
5	FW	Manuel Aristondo	26 February 1982		(Guatemala) Glucosoral
6	FW	Daniel Tejada	22 November 1986		(Guatemala) Maya de Oro
7	FW	Jannick Ramírez	16 May 1987		(Guatemala) Maya de Oro
8	FW	Reinaldo Rosales	20 June 1977		(Guatemala) Glucosoral
9	FW	Carlos Estrada	11 December 1982		(Guatemala) Glucosoral
10	MF	Erick Acevedo	20 September 1980		(Guatemala) Glucosoral
11	FW	Luis Castro	27 December 1984		(Guatemala) Maya de Oro
12	GK	William Ramírez	2 February 1980		(Guatemala) Glucosoral
13	DF	Estuardo de León	6 July 1977		(Guatemala) Glucosoral
14	DF	Oliver López	2 February 1979		(Guatemala) Glucosoral

=== Ukraine ===
Head coach: (Ukraine) Gennadiy Lisenchuk

No.	Pos.	Player	Date of birth (age)	Caps	Club
1	GK	Vladyslav Lysenko	13 August 1979		(Ukraine) Planeta-Most Kyiv
2	DF	Mykhaylo Romanov	21 July 1983		(Ukraine) Kontingent Zhytomyr
3	DF	Roman Vakhula	13 July 1985		(Ukraine) TVD Lviv
4	FW	Dmytro Ivanov	15 December 1985		(Russia) Mytischi Moscow
5	DF	Yevgen Rogachov	30 August 1983		(Ukraine) TVD Lviv
6	FW	Ildar Makayev	18 August 1982		(Ukraine) Taim Lviv
7	FW	Sergiy Cheporniuk	18 April 1982		(Ukraine) Taim Lviv
8	DF	Oleksandr Khursov	1 June 1981		(Ukraine) Enakievez Enakievo
9	FW	Valeriy Zamyatin	5 January 1979		(Ukraine) Enakievez Enakievo
10	FW	Valeriy Legchanov	13 February 1980		(Ukraine) Energy Lviv
11	FW	Dmytro Silchenko	7 October 1982		(Ukraine) TVD Lviv
12	GK	Yevgen Ivanyak	28 September 1982		(Ukraine) Taim Lviv
13	DF	Fedir Pylypiv	8 February 1978		(Ukraine) Urahan Ivano-Frankivsk
14	FW	Sergiy Zhurba	14 March 1987		(Ukraine) Lugansk

== Group D ==
=== Czech Republic ===
Head coach: (Czech Republic) Tomáš Neumann

No.	Pos.	Player	Date of birth (age)	Caps	Club
1	GK	Tomáš Meller	11 November 1975		(Czech Republic) Era-Pack Chrudim
2	DF	David Cupák	27 May 1989		(Czech Republic) Helas Brno
3	DF	Jiří Novotný	12 July 1988		(Czech Republic) Eco Investment Prague
4	FW	David Filinger	12 January 1978		(Czech Republic) Benago Prague
5	DF	Tomáš Sluka	19 May 1978		(Czech Republic) Era-Pack Chrudim
6	FW	Roman Mareš	15 March 1975		(Czech Republic) Era-Pack Chrudim
7	FW	Martin Dlouhý	3 March 1975		(Czech Republic) Eco Investment Prague
8	FW	Marek Kopecký	19 February 1977		(Czech Republic) Era-Pack Chrudim
9	DF	David Frič	17 February 1983		(Czech Republic) Eco Investment Prague
10	FW	Lukáš Rešetár	21 March 1984		(Czech Republic) Era-Pack Chrudim
11	DF	Michal Mareš	28 April 1976		(Czech Republic) Era-Pack Chrudim
12	GK	Libor Gerčák	22 July 1975		(Czech Republic) Vysoke Myto
13	FW	Zdeněk Sláma	28 December 1982		(Czech Republic) Eco Investment Prague
14	DF	Jan Janovský	20 June 1985		(Poland) Jango Katowice

=== Iran ===
Head coach: (Iran) Hossein Shams

No.	Pos.	Player	Date of birth (age)	Caps	Club
1	GK	Asghar Ghahremani	6 March 1972		(Iran) Shahr Aftab Tehran
2	MF	Morteza Azimaei	11 September 1982		(Iran) Rah Sari
3	FW	Mohammad Taheri	2 May 1985		(Iran) Shahid Mansouri Gharchak
4	DF	Mohammad Keshavarz	5 July 1982		(Iran) Shahid Mansouri Gharchak
5	MF	Mohammad Hashemzadeh	20 January 1977		(Iran) Foolad Mahan Isfahan
6	FW	Javad Asghari Moghaddam	12 August 1979		(Iran) Foolad Mahan Isfahan
7	MF	Ali Asghar Hassanzadeh	2 November 1987		(Iran) Eram Kish Qom
8	MF	Mostafa Tayyebi	9 June 1987		(Iran) Elmo Adab Mashhad
9	FW	Vahid Shamsaei	21 September 1975		(Iran) Foolad Mahan Isfahan
10	DF	Majid Latifi	21 March 1981		(Iran) Eram Kish Qom
11	FW	Ebrahim Masoudi	16 August 1982		Tam Iran Khodro
12	GK	Mostafa Nazari	11 December 1982		(Iran) Eram Kish Qom
13	FW	Masoud Daneshvar	30 January 1988		(Iran) Sadra Shiraz
14	GK	Hamid Reza Abrarinia	29 September 1978		(Iran) Foolad Mahan Isfahan

=== Libya ===
Head coach: (Croatia) Mato Stanković

No.	Pos.	Player	Date of birth (age)	Caps	Club
1	GK	Fatah Masoud	24 September 1989		no club affiliation
2	DF	Yousef Mohammed	3 December 1982		no club affiliation
3	FW	Abdul-Wahed Mohammed	30 July 1977		no club affiliation
4	FW	Nagi El-Tomi	23 October 1977		no club affiliation
5	MF	Fathi Al-Khoga	8 May 1984		no club affiliation
6	DF	Rabie El-Hoti	19 June 1985		no club affiliation
7	MF	Hamdi Ismail	17 January 1984		no club affiliation
8	MF	Nabil Omran	31 January 1981		no club affiliation
9	DF	Mohammed Shahout	2 May 1982		no club affiliation
10	FW	Mohammed Rahoma	5 May 1984		no club affiliation
12	GK	Mohammed Al-Sharif	15 March 1985		no club affiliation
13	GK	Akrem El-Twati	23 March 1985		no club affiliation
14	MF	Mohamed Suleiman	27 September 1988		no club affiliation

=== Spain ===
Head coach: (Spain) José Venancio López Hierro

No.	Pos.	Player	Date of birth (age)	Caps	Club
1	GK	Luis Amado	4 May 1976		(Spain) Inter Movistar
2	DF	Carlos Ortiz	3 October 1983		(Spain) Inter Movistar
3	DF	Javi Eseverri	28 August 1977		(Spain) MRA Navarra
4	DF	Jordi Torras	24 September 1980		(Spain) Inter Movistar
5	MF	Fernandão	16 August 1980		(Spain) Barcelona Senseit
6	FW	Álvaro	29 September 1977		(Spain) ElPozo Murcia
7	FW	Javi Rodríguez	26 March 1974		(Spain) Barcelona Senseit
8	DF	Kike	4 May 1978		(Spain) ElPozo Murcia
9	FW	Andreu	24 February 1975		(Spain) Caja Segovia
10	FW	Borja	16 November 1984		(Spain) Inter Movistar
11	MF	Marcelo	11 January 1974		(Spain) ElPozo Murcia
12	GK	Juanjo	19 August 1985		(Spain) ElPozo Murcia
13	GK	Cristian	27 August 1982		(Spain) Barcelona Senseit
14	FW	Daniel	6 July 1976		(Spain) Inter Movistar

=== Uruguay ===
Head coach: (Uruguay) Gustavo Sánchez

No.	Pos.	Player	Date of birth (age)	Caps	Club
1	GK	Diego Codina	31 January 1980		(Uruguay) Nacional
2	DF	Pablo Lanza	1 August 1986		(Uruguay) Nacional
3	FW	Jorge Rodríguez	15 December 1984		(Uruguay) Nacional
4	FW	Mauro Ruiz	14 November 1988		(Uruguay) Nacional
5	FW	Bernardo Rodríguez	8 August 1981		(Uruguay) Old Christians
6	FW	Daniel Laurino	14 April 1989		(Spain) ElPozo Murcia
7	DF	Jorge Sena	15 December 1980		(Uruguay) Nacional
8	MF	Diego Garrido	26 December 1984		(Uruguay) Nacional
9	DF	Juan Custódio	15 November 1985		(Uruguay) Nacional
10	FW	Mincho	27 December 1983		(Uruguay) Rio Branco
11	DF	Richard Catardo	15 December 1988		(Uruguay) Peñarol
12	GK	Pablo Ferragut	21 November 1983		(Uruguay) Victoria
13	DF	Walter Rodríguez	24 December 1986		(Uruguay) Old Christians
14	DF	Sebá	22 November 1978		(Uruguay) Peñarol
