= List of 2008 FIFA Futsal World Cup goalscorers =

The full list of the 2008 FIFA Futsal World Cup goalscorers :

16 goals

- (Russia) Pula

15 goals

- (Brazil) Falcão

11 goals

- (Brazil) Lenísio

10 goals

- (Brazil) Schumacher
- (Russia) Damir Khamadiev

9 goals

- (Russia) Vladislav Shayakhmetov

8 goals

- (Paraguay) René Villalba
- (Paraguay) Fabio Alcaraz
- (Russia) Sirilo

7 goals

- (Italy) Fernando Grana
- (Russia) Dmitry Prudnikov
- (Spain) Fernandão

6 goals

- (Brazil) Betão

5 goals

- (Brazil) Wilde
- (Brazil) Vinícius
- (Cuba) Eduardo Morales
- (Iran) Mohammad Taheri
- (Iran) Vahid Shamsaee
- (Russia) Konstantin Maevskiy
- (Ukraine) Valeriy Zamyatin

4 goals

- (Argentina) Marcelo Giménez
- (Cuba) Yosniel Mesa
- (Iran) Ali Asghar Hassanzadeh
- (Iran) Mohammad Hashemzadeh
- (Italy) Patrick Nora
- (Japan) Nobuya Osodo
- (Paraguay) José Rotella
- (Portugal) Arnaldo Pereira
- (Spain) Álvaro
- (Spain) Daniel
- (Spain) Javi Rodríguez
- (Spain) Torras
- (Ukraine) Sergiy Cheporniuk

3 goals

- (Argentina) Diego Giustozzi
- (Argentina) Matías Lucuix
- (Brazil) Ari
- (Brazil) Marquinho
- (Egypt) Ahmed El Agouz
- (Guatemala) Carlos Estrada
- (Guatemala) Erick Acevedo
- (Italy) Adriano Foglia
- (Italy) Saad Assis
- (Japan) Yuki Kanayama
- (Portugal) Fernando Leitão
- (Ukraine) Ildar Makayev
- (Ukraine) Mykhaylo Romanov

2 goals

- (Argentina) Martín Amas
- (Argentina) Sebastián Corazza
- (Brazil) Gabriel
- (Brazil) Ciço
- (China) Hu Jie
- (Cuba) Carlos Madrigal
- (Cuba) Yulier Olivera
- (Czech Republic) Martin Dlouhý
- (Czech Republic) Tomáš Sluka
- (Egypt) Mizo
- (Guatemala) Daniel Tejada
- (Guatemala) José González
- (Iran) Masoud Daneshvar
- (Iran) Mostafa Tayyebi
- (Italy) Edgar Bertoni
- (Italy) Marcio Forte
- (Italy) Sandro Zanetti
- (Libya) Mohammed Rahoma
- (Libya) Rabie Abdel
- (Japan) Kotaro Inaba
- (Paraguay) Rodolfo Román
- (Portugal) Fernando Cardinal
- (Russia) Konstantin Agapov
- (Russia) Konstantin Dushkevich
- (Solomon Islands) Elliot Ragomo
- (Spain) Marcelo
- (Thailand) Eakapong Suratsawang
- (Thailand) Panuwat Janta
- (Ukraine) Dmytro Ivanov
- (Ukraine) Valeriy Legchanov
- (Ukraine) Yevgen Rogachov

1 goal

- (Argentina) Esteban González
- (Argentina) Fernando Wilhelm
- (Argentina) Hernan Garcias
- (Argentina) Leandro Planas
- (Brazil) Carlinhos
- (China) Liu Xinyi
- (China) Zheng Tao
- (China) Zhang Xi
- (Cuba) Boris Saname
- (Cuba) Jhonnet Martínez
- (Cuba) Yampier Rodríguez
- (Czech Republic) David Filinger
- (Czech Republic) Jan Janovský
- (Czech Republic) Marek Kopecký
- (Czech Republic) Michal Mareš
- (Czech Republic) Roman Mareš
- (Czech Republic) Zdeněk Sláma
- (Egypt) Abou El Komsan
- (Egypt) Ahmed Abou Serie
- (Egypt) Ramadan Samasry
- (Egypt) Sameh Saleh
- (Guatemala) Estuardo de León
- (Guatemala) Luis Castro
- (Guatemala) Manuel Aristondo
- (Guatemala) Marlon Noj
- (Iran) Ebrahim Masoudi
- (Italy) Fabiano Assad
- (Japan) Kenichiro Kogure
- (Japan) Kenta Fujii
- (Japan) Yusuke Inada
- (Japan) Yusuke Komiyama
- (Libya) Fathi Al-Khoga
- (Libya) Mohammed Shahout
- (Libya) Yousef Mohammed

1 goal cont.

- (Paraguay) Carlos Chilavert
- (Paraguay) José Luis Santander
- (Paraguay) Oscar Jara
- (Paraguay) Robson Fernández
- (Paraguay) Walter Villalba
- (Portugal) Jardel
- (Portugal) Bibi
- (Portugal) Gonçalo
- (Portugal) Israel
- (Portugal) Pedro Costa
- (Portugal) Ricardinho
- (Russia) Marat Azizov
- (Russia) Nikolay Pereverzev
- (Solomon Islands) Ron Ginio
- (Solomon Islands) Jack Wetney
- (Solomon Islands) Micah Lea'alafa
- (Spain) Borja
- (Spain) Ortiz
- (Spain) Luis Amado
- (Thailand) Lertchai Issarasuwipakorn
- (Thailand) Prasert Innui
- (Thailand) Sermphan Khumthinkaew
- (Ukraine) Oleksandr Khursov
- (United States) Andy Rosenband
- (United States) Denison Cabral
- (United States) Mike Apple
- (United States) Pat Morris
- (United States) Sandre Naumoski
- (Uruguay) Daniel Laurino
- (Uruguay) Diego Garrido
- (Uruguay) Mincho
- (Uruguay) Jorge Rodríguez
- (Uruguay) Juan Custódio
- (Uruguay) Sebá

Own goals

- (China) Hu Jie (for Ukraine)
- (Cuba) Yosniel Mesa (for Russia)
- (Egypt) Sameh Saleh (for Ukraine)
- (Italy) Adriano Foglia (for Spain)
- (Japan) Yoshifumi Maeda (for Solomon Islands)
- (Paraguay) José Luis Santander (for Argentina)
- (Paraguay) José Luis Santander (for Italy)
- (Russia) Dmitry Prudnikov (for Brazil)
- (Ukraine) Fedir Pylypiv (for Iran)
