= 2008 FIFA Futsal World Cup – first round =

The 2008 FIFA Futsal World Cup first round took place from 30 September to 9 October 2008.

== Group A ==
Team	Pld	W	D	L	GF	GA	GD	Pts
Brazil (H)	4	4	0	0	49	1	+48	12
Russia	4	3	0	1	50	15	+35	9
Japan	4	2	0	2	13	24	−11	6
Cuba	4	1	0	3	16	25	−9	3
Solomon Islands	4	0	0	4	6	69	−63	0

(H) Hosts
2008-09-30
10:30

Brazil	12–1	Japan
Lenísio 3'00', 35'36'; Marquinho 4'00'; Falcão 11'00' (pen.), 31'58'; Wilde 22'45'; Ari 24'38', 27'21'; Schumacher 26'37', 34'53'; Betão 28'44'; Ciço 31'42'	(Report)	14'36' Osodo

Nilson Nelson Gymnasium, Brasília
Attendance: 6,572
Referee: (Italy) Massimo Cumbo
2008-09-30
12:30

Cuba	10–2	Solomon Islands
Olivera 2'56', 9'26'; Madrigal 5'35'; Saname 9'59'; Morales 15'07', 26'02', 26'21', 29'05'; Martínez 26'49'; Mesa 39'16' (pen.)	(Report)	0'42', 39'24' Ragomo

Nilson Nelson Gymnasium, Brasília
Attendance: 3,231
Referee: (Paraguay) Nestor Ibarra

2008-10-02
10:30

Solomon Islands	0–21	Brazil
	(Report)	Lenísio 4'11', 22'18', 34'34', 36'54'; Wilde 5'01', 18'52'; Vinícius 7'28'; Falcão 8'32', 18'07', 21'20', 32'28', 39'44', 40'00'; Schumacher 13'42', 16'18', 29'05'; Betão 24'49', 27'19', 27'54'; Gabriel 33'49'; Carlinhos 34'18'

Nilson Nelson Gymnasium, Brasília
Attendance: 5,845
Referee: (United States) Jason Krnac
2008-10-02
12:30

Russia	10–5	Cuba
Mesa 3'10' (o.g.); Shayakhmetov 6'02', 34'41' (pen.); Maevskiy 6'53'; Prudnikov 8'; Sirilo 8'50', 31'03'; Khamadiev 28'48'; Pula 36'39', 39'45'	(Report)	14'39' Madrigal; 16'28', 34'06', 37'14' Mesa; 36'55' Morales

Nilson Nelson Gymnasium, Brasília
Attendance: 3,462
Referee: (Uruguay) Álvaro Sacarelo

2008-10-04
10:30

Brazil	7–0	Russia
Schumacher 2'32'; Prudnikov 7'34' (o.g.); Lenísio 13'16', 21'19'; Ciço 15'33'; Falcão 28'29'; Vinícius 31'50'	(Report)

Nilson Nelson Gymnasium, Brasília
Attendance: 8,202
Referee: (Venezuela) Octalivar Hernández
2008-10-04
12:30

Japan	7–2	Solomon Islands
Kanayama 2'34'; Kogure 9'01'; Komiyama 11'44'; Fujii 22'10'; Osodo 27'40', 38'41'; Inada 31'38'	(Report)	17'47' (o.g.) Maeda; 18'43' Ginio

Nilson Nelson Gymnasium, Brasília
Attendance: 1,785
Referee: (Spain) Roberto Gracia

2008-10-06
10:30

Japan	4–1	Cuba
Osodo 23'07'; Inaba 25'31', 33'13'; Kanayama 31'03'	(Report)	15'50' Y. Rodríguez

Nilson Nelson Gymnasium, Brasília
Attendance: 5,096
Referee: (Libya) Tawfik Al-Dawi
2008-10-06
12:30

Russia	31–2	Solomon Islands
Khamadiev 1'26', 2'51', 14'24', 30'23', 34'39'; Shayakhmetov 1'46', 2'13', 21'27', 35'56'; Sirilo 3'01', 4'17', 10'12', 10'34', 11'26', 32'05'; Pula 4'00', 5'21', 10'59', 16'06', 16'59', 18'51', 24'48', 25'02', 27'13'; Maevskiy 5'03', 13'02'; Agapov 7'09'; Prudnikov 14'36', 34'22'; Pereverzev 36'47'; Azizov 39'11'	(Report)	22'59' Wetney; 27'35' Lea'alafa

Nilson Nelson Gymnasium, Brasília
Attendance: 5,548
Referee: (Iran) Alireza Sohrabi

2008-10-08
10:30

Brazil	9–0	Cuba
Schumacher 3'39'; Wilde 7'37', 16'19'; Falcão 12'42' (pen.), 23'16'; Lenísio 19'44'; Vinícius 20'20'; Betão 26'04', 34'37'	(Report)

Nilson Nelson Gymnasium, Brasília
Attendance: 8,530
Referee: (Czech Republic) Karel Henych
2008-10-08
10:30

Russia	9–1	Japan
Prudnikov 3'49', 28'44'; Khamadiev 7'18', 9'46', 20'23'; Agapov 21'46'; Pula 22'13'; Maevskiy 22'55'; Shayakhmetov 37'51'	(Report)	25'08' Kanayama

Ginásio do Maracanãzinho, Rio de Janeiro
Attendance: 4,454
Referee: (Colombia) Fabián López

== Group B ==
Team	Pld	W	D	L	GF	GA	GD	Pts
Paraguay	4	3	0	1	19	5	+14	9 (Note: The ranking between the top three teams was determined by the results of matches between them.)
Italy	4	3	0	1	12	6	+6	9
Portugal	4	3	0	1	15	8	+7	9
Thailand	4	1	0	3	7	15	−8	3
United States	4	0	0	4	5	24	−19	0

Notes:
2008-09-30
10:30

Italy	1–0	Thailand
Grana 15'55' (pen.)	(Report)

Ginásio do Maracanãzinho, Rio de Janeiro
Attendance: 4,012
Referee: (Mozambique) Asselam Khan
2008-09-30
12:30

Paraguay	5–0	United States
Santander 6'01'; Alcaraz 16'24'; Fernandez 19'49'; Chilavert 22'35'; R. Villalba 38'57'	(Report)

Ginásio do Maracanãzinho, Rio de Janeiro
Attendance: 4,012
Referee: (Ukraine) Oleg Ivanov

2008-10-02
10:30

Portugal	3–2	Paraguay
Pedro Costa 1'14'; Arnaldo 21'29', 37'32'	(Report)	7'24' Rotella; 27'30' R. Villalba

Ginásio do Maracanãzinho, Rio de Janeiro
Attendance: 2,736
Referee: (Guatemala) Carlos del Cid
2008-10-02
12:30

United States	1–6	Italy
Rosenband 4'25'	(Report)	7'28' Foglia; 10'56' Zanetti; 31'26' Nora; 35'21' (pen.) Grana; 36'25' Bertoni; 39'08' (pen.) Assis

Ginásio do Maracanãzinho, Rio de Janeiro
Attendance: 3,271
Referee: (Brazil) Tales Goulart

2008-10-04
10:30

Thailand	5–3	United States
Ekkapong Suratsawang 13'37'; Innui 15'50'; Issarasuwipakorn 28'06'; Janta 29'51'; Khumthinkaew 38'55'	(Report)	19'55' Apple; 21'16' Cabral; 39'58' Morris

Ginásio do Maracanãzinho, Rio de Janeiro
Attendance: 3,908
Referee: (Peru) Héctor Rojas
2008-10-04
12:30

Italy	3–1	Portugal
Grana 15'10' (pen.), 33'38'; Assis 36'21'	(Report)	38'59' Ricardinho

Ginásio do Maracanãzinho, Rio de Janeiro
Attendance: 4,463
Referee: (Argentina) Sergio Ghibaudi

2008-10-06
10:30

Portugal	8–1	United States
Leitão 1'12', 2'43', 27'03'; Gonçalo 20'30'; Arnaldo 23'16'; Jardel 27'57'; Bibi 29'13'; Cardinal 36'51'	(Report)	36'00' Naumoski

Ginásio do Maracanãzinho, Rio de Janeiro
Attendance: 3,935
Referee: (China) Li Zhizhong
2008-10-06
12:30

Thailand	0–8	Paraguay
	(Report)	5'12', 12'12' (pen.), 12'44', 24'51' R. Villalba; 27'29' Jara; 31'30' W. Villalba; 36'18', 38'27' Román

Ginásio do Maracanãzinho, Rio de Janeiro
Attendance: 4,025
Referee: (Mozambique) Asselam Khan

2008-10-08
12:30

Italy	2–4	Paraguay
Zanetti 6'55'; Santander 16'10' (o.g.)	(Report)	15'24', 37'40' Rotella; 21'07' Alcaraz; 32'38' R. Villalba

Ginásio do Maracanãzinho, Rio de Janeiro
Attendance: 5,017
Referee: (Cuba) Antonio Álvarez
2008-10-08
12:30

Portugal	3 – 2	Thailand
Arnaldo 2'50'; Israel 26'59'; Cardinal 39'58'	(Report)	19'53' Ekkapong Suratsawang; 37'59' Janta

Nilson Nelson Gymnasium, Brasília
Attendance: 4,826
Referee: (Malaysia) Badrul Hisham Kalam

== Group C ==
Team	Pld	W	D	L	GF	GA	GD	Pts
Ukraine	4	3	1	0	17	7	+10	10
Argentina	4	3	1	0	13	5	+8	10
Guatemala	4	2	0	2	14	9	+5	6
Egypt	4	1	0	3	9	12	−3	3
China	4	0	0	4	5	25	−20	0

2008-10-01
10:30

Guatemala	1–0	Egypt
Acevedo 39'23'	(Report)

Nilson Nelson Gymnasium, Brasília
Attendance: 5,156
Referee: (Australia) Scott Kidson
2008-10-01
12:30

Argentina	5–0	China
Giménez 5'59', 8'01', 16'35'; Amas 29'20'; Corazza 39'25'	(Report)

Nilson Nelson Gymnasium, Brasília
Attendance: 5,150
Referee: (Portugal) António Cardoso

2008-10-03
10:30

Egypt	2–4	Argentina
El-Agouz 17'09'; Samasry 21'12'	(Report)	16'21' Giménez; 22'00', 39'26' Giustozzi; 31'38' Lucuix

Nilson Nelson Gymnasium, Brasília
Attendance: 4,385
Referee: (Czech Republic) Karel Henych
2008-10-03
12:30

Ukraine	6–2	Guatemala
Zamyatin 12'45'; Cheporniuk 23'03'; Rogachov 25'25', 28'25'; Romanov 35'45'; Legchanov 39'52'	(Report)	21'02' de León; 34'43' Acevedo

Nilson Nelson Gymnasium, Brasília
Attendance: 4,456
Referee: (Malaysia) Badrul Hisham Kalam

2008-10-05
10:30

China	2–6	Egypt
Zhang Xi 24'58'; Hu Jie 39'45'	(Report)	9'50' Saleh; 17'09' Mizo; 18'11' El-Komsan; 21'36', 23'14' El-Agouz; 26'16' Abou Serie

Nilson Nelson Gymnasium, Brasília
Attendance: 6,264
Referee: (Hungary) Karoly Torok
2008-10-05
12:30

Argentina	2–2	Ukraine
Planas 31'57'; Giustozzi 39'47'	(Report)	37'26' Ivanov; 38'15' Cheporniuk

Nilson Nelson Gymnasium, Brasília
Attendance: 6,335
Referee: (South Korea) Kim Jang-Kwan

2008-10-07
10:30

China	1–10	Guatemala
Liu Xinyi 31'47'	(Report)	1'48' Acevedo; 3'28', 18'22' Tejada; 9'36', 36'58' González; 10'01' Castro; 10'11', 16'10', 37'45' Estrada; 33'54' Noj

Nilson Nelson Gymnasium, Brasília
Attendance: 5,609
Referee: (Croatia) Edi Sunjic
2008-10-07
12:30

Ukraine	5–1	Egypt
Saleh 7'37' (o.g.); Legchanov 18'59' (pen.); Ivanov 21'06'; Cheporniuk 31'04' (pen.); Zamyatin 36'09'	(Report)	29'03' Mizo

Nilson Nelson Gymnasium, Brasília
Attendance: 5,703
Referee: (Ecuador) Franklin Loor

2008-10-09
12:30

Argentina	2–1	Guatemala
Lucuix 1'15'; Wilhelm 28'27'	(Report)	38'41' Aristondo

Nilson Nelson Gymnasium, Brasília
Attendance: 6,178
Referee: (Italy) Massimo Cumbo
2008-10-09
12:30

Ukraine	4–2	China
Zamyatin 19'47', 32'28'; Makayev 35'47'; Hu Jie 36'09' (o.g.)	(Report)	18'17' Hu Jie; 38'40' Zheng Tao

Ginásio do Maracanãzinho, Rio de Janeiro
Attendance: 4,552
Referee: (Mozambique) Asselam Khan

== Group D ==
Team	Pld	W	D	L	GF	GA	GD	Pts
Spain	4	3	1	0	13	3	+10	10
Iran	4	3	1	0	14	9	+5	10
Czech Republic	4	2	0	2	10	10	0	6
Libya	4	0	1	3	7	14	−7	1
Uruguay	4	0	1	3	6	14	−8	1

2008-10-01
10:30

Spain	3–3	Iran
Torras 21'12', 36'00'; Borja 29'01'	(Report)	3'29' Taheri; 11'29' Shamsaee; 11'46' Hassanzadeh

Ginásio do Maracanãzinho, Rio de Janeiro
Referee: (Colombia) Fabián López
2008-10-01
12:30

Uruguay	3–3	Libya
Custódio 1'58'; Laurino 21'31'; Garrido 30'53'	(Report)	27'45' El-Hoti; 36'47' Shahout; 39'36' Al-Khoga

Ginásio do Maracanãzinho, Rio de Janeiro
Attendance: 3,557
Referee: (Japan) Kazuya Isokawa

2008-10-03
10:30

Libya	0–3	Spain
	(Report)	2'52' Javi Rodríguez; 15'25' Álvaro; 29'29' Daniel

Ginásio do Maracanãzinho, Rio de Janeiro
Attendance: 3,339
Referee: (Kyrgyzstan) Nurdin Bukuev
2008-10-03
12:30

Czech Republic	4–1	Uruguay
R. Mareš 7'43'; Sluka 24'53'; Sláma 28'02'; Filinger 39'18'	(Report)	16'30' Sebá

Ginásio do Maracanãzinho, Rio de Janeiro
Attendance: 3,293
Referee: (Costa Rica) Héctor Mesen

2008-10-05
10:30

Spain	4–0	Czech Republic
Javi Rodríguez 0'11'; Marcelo 20'45', 22'25'; Daniel 21'51' (pen.)	(Report)

Ginásio do Maracanãzinho, Rio de Janeiro
Attendance: 2,471
Referee: (Russia) Ivan Shabanov
2008-10-05
12:30

Iran	4–2	Libya
Taheri 4'34'; Hashemzadeh 6'28', 16'48'; Tayyebi 31'54'	(Report)	18'36' El-Hoti; 24'34' (pen.) Rahoma

Ginásio do Maracanãzinho, Rio de Janeiro
Attendance: 4,103
Referee: (Panama) Elix Peralta

2008-10-07
10:30

Czech Republic	4–2	Libya
M. Mareš 6'48' (pen.); Kopecký 14'12'; Dlouhý 25'54'; Sluka 38'39'	(Report)	17'06' Yousef; 23'28' Rahoma

Ginásio do Maracanãzinho, Rio de Janeiro
Attendance: 3,530
Referee: (Brazil) Tales Goulart
2008-10-07
12:30

Iran	4–2	Uruguay
Taheri 2'14'; Tayyebi 8'28'; Shamsaee 20'49'; Hashemzadeh 27'14'	(Report)	14'03' (pen.) Mincho; 37'08' Rodríguez

Ginásio do Maracanãzinho, Rio de Janeiro
Attendance: 3,900
Referee: (Cuba) Antonio Álvarez

2008-10-09
10:30

Spain	3–0	Uruguay
Javi Rodríguez 18'45'; Fernandão 20'21', 21'45'	(Report)

Ginásio do Maracanãzinho, Rio de Janeiro
Attendance: 4,442
Referee: (Costa Rica) Héctor Mesen
2008-10-09
10:30

Czech Republic	2–3	Iran
Janovský 27'42'; Dlouhý 31'37'	(Report)	16'42' 39'33' Hassanzadeh; 30'14' Shamsaee

Nilson Nelson Gymnasium, Brasília
Attendance: 5,786
Referee: (Portugal) António Cardoso
