= 2008 FIFA Futsal World Cup – second round =

The 2008 FIFA Futsal World Cup second round took place from 11 October to 14 October 2008.

== Group E ==
Team	Pld	W	D	L	GF	GA	GD	Pts
Brazil	3	3	0	0	9	3	6	9
Italy	3	1	1	1	9	8	1	4
Iran	3	1	1	1	10	10	0	4
Ukraine	3	0	0	3	7	14	–7	0

2008-10-11
10:30

Brazil	1 – 0	Iran
Schumacher 2'37'	(Report)

Ginásio do Maracanãzinho, Rio de Janeiro
Attendance: 7,811
Referee: (Russia) Ivan Shabanov
2008-10-11
12:30

Ukraine	0 – 4	Italy
	(Report)	26'28', 33'23' Nora; 31'33', 39'53' Forte

Ginásio do Maracanãzinho, Rio de Janeiro
Attendance: 7,930
Referee: (Peru) Hector Rojas

2008-10-12
10:30

Italy	0 – 3	Brazil
	(Report)	11'12' Schumacher; 13'29' Lenísio; 29'01' Ari

Ginásio do Maracanãzinho, Rio de Janeiro
Attendance: 8,077
Referee: (Cuba) Antonio Betancourt
2008-10-12
12:30

Ukraine	4 – 5	Iran
Makayev 5'04', 36'13'; Cheporniuk 8'22'; Khursov 15'39'	(Report)	9'01' (pen.), 12'26' (pen.) Shamsaee; 10'57' (o.g.) Pylypiv; 14'08', 19'03' (pen.) Taheri

Ginásio do Maracanãzinho, Rio de Janeiro
Attendance: 7,396
Referee: (Mozambique) Asselam Khan

2008-10-14
10:30

Brazil	5 – 3	Ukraine
Falcão 8'04', 15'53', 19'49'; Lenísio 17'12'; Marquinho 21'20'	(Report)	1'04' Zamyatin; 16'42', 39'48' Romanov

Ginásio do Maracanãzinho, Rio de Janeiro
Attendance: 6,141
Referee: (Paraguay) Nestor Valiente
2008-10-14
10:30

Iran	5 – 5	Italy
Daneshvar 10'38', 35'30'; Masoudi 12'23'; Hashemzadeh 26'30'; Hassanzadeh 28'29'	(Report)	1'17', 8'06' Grana; 13'57' Nora; 30'56' Fabiano; 39'09' Bertoni

Nilson Nelson Gymnasium, Brasília
Attendance: 7,881
Referee: (Australia) Scott Kidson

== Group F ==
Team	Pld	W	D	L	GF	GA	GD	Pts
Spain	3	3	0	0	11	4	7	9
Russia	3	1	1	1	9	11	–2	4
Argentina	3	0	2	1	6	7	–1	2
Paraguay	3	0	1	2	8	12	–4	1

2008-10-11
10:30

Paraguay	3 – 3	Argentina
Alcaraz 1'17', 38'16'; R. Villalba 13'00'	(Report)	16'21' Corazza; 33'39' (o.g.) Santander; 34'32' Lucuix

Nilson Nelson Gymnasium, Brasília
Attendance: 5,961
Referee: (Ecuador) Franklin Loor
2008-10-11
12:30

Spain	5 – 2	Russia
Álvaro 12'28'; Torras 30'32'; Daniel 32'23' (pen.); Javi Rodríguez 38'36'; Luis Amado 39'09'	(Report)	17'39' Prudnikov; 26'52' Maevskiy

Nilson Nelson Gymnasium, Brasília
Attendance: 6,244
Referee: (Italy) Massimo Cumbo

2008-10-12
10:30

Spain	2 – 1	Argentina
Fernandao 14'09'; Ortiz 23'43'	(Report)	19'58' Garcias

Nilson Nelson Gymnasium, Brasília
Attendance: 4,180
Referee: (Australia) Scott Kidson
2008-10-12
12:30

Russia	5 – 4	Paraguay
Pula 7'58', 31'18' (pen.), 34'26'; Shayakhmetov 18'26' (pen.), 39'59'	(Report)	19'14' (pen.) Rotella; 22'56', 31'01', 38'11' Alcaraz

Nilson Nelson Gymnasium, Brasília
Attendance: 4,371
Referee: (United States) Jason Krnac

2008-10-14
12:30

Argentina	2 – 2	Russia
Amas 4'06'; González 35'46'	(Report)	16'36' Dushkevich; 31'37' Prudnikov

Ginásio do Maracanãzinho, Rio de Janeiro
Attendance: 6,407
Referee: (Cuba) Antonio Betancourt
2008-10-14
12:30

Paraguay	1 – 4	Spain
Alcaraz 34'00' (pen.)	(Report)	3'40' Álvaro; 21'08', 36'54', 37'28' Fernandao

Nilson Nelson Gymnasium, Brasília
Attendance: 8,108
Referee: (Ecuador) Franklin Loor
