= 2007 UEFA Futsal Championship =

Campeonato Europeu de Futsal de 2007
- UEFA Futsal Championship Portugal 2007 logo

Tournament details
- Host country: Portugal
- Dates: 16–25 November
- Teams: 8 (from 1 confederation)
- Venues: 2 (in 1 host city)

Final positions
- Champions: Spain (4th title)
- Runners-up: Italy
- Third place: Russia
- Fourth place: Portugal

Tournament statistics
- Matches played: 16
- Goals scored: 83 (5.19 per match)
- Attendance: 33,579 (2,099 per match)
- Top scorer(s): (Spain) Daniel (Serbia) Predrag Rajić (Russia) Cirilo (5 goals each)
- Best player: (Portugal) Ricardinho

The 2007 UEFA Futsal Championship was the sixth official edition of the UEFA-governed European Championship for national futsal teams. It was held in Portugal, between November 16 and November 25, 2007, in two venues located in Porto's Greater Metropolitan Area — Gondomar and Santo Tirso municipalities. Eight teams competed in the final round, after a qualifying phase where seven teams managed to join the Portuguese hosts.

Spain, the 2000 FIFA Futsal World Championship and 2004 FIFA Futsal World Championship winners, successfully defended their European crown and added a fourth continental title to their record, by defeating Italy 3-1, in a reprise of the last FIFA Futsal World Championship final.

== Bids ==
The Portuguese bid was selected during a meeting of UEFA's Executive Committee, on April 19, 2005, in Tallinn, Estonia. The bid was picked ahead of two other entries from the Netherlands (Eindhoven and Maastricht) and Bosnia and Herzegovina (Sarajevo), which had been previously shortlisted from nine preliminary bids.

== Venues ==
The bid's proposed main venue was to be the 4,500-seated Rosa Mota Pavilion, in the heart of Porto, and a second venue would be located in the neighbouring Matosinhos municipality. However, on August 14, 2006 the tournament's main venue was switched to the future 3,800-seated arena in the Gondomar municipality — the Pavilhão Multiusos de Gondomar "Coração de Ouro" (English: Gondomar's Multi-Purpose Pavilion "Heart of Gold". The second venue was also changed to Santo Tirso's Pavilhão Desportivo Municipal (English: Municipal Sports Pavilion).

- Pavilhão Multiusos de Gondomar "Coração de Ouro"
- Pavilhão Municipal de Santo Tirso

== Referees ==
- Alexandr Remin (Belarus)
- Antonio Jose Fernandes Cardoso (Portugal)
- Antonius Van Eekelen (Netherlands)
- Edi Šunjić (Croatia)
- Ivan Shabanov (Russia)
- Karel Henych (Czech Republic)
- Károly Török (Hungary)
- Massimo Cumbo (Italy)
- Oleg Ivanov (Ukraine)
- Pascal Lemal (Belgium)
- Roberto Gracia Marin (Spain)
- Vladimir Colbasiuc (Moldova)

== Final tournament ==
=== Group stage ===
==== Group A ====
Team	Pld	W	D	L	GF	GA	GD	Pts
Italy	3	2	1	0	11	1	+10	7
Portugal	3	2	1	0	8	3	+5	7
Romania	3	1	0	2	9	14	−5	3
Czech Republic	3	0	0	3	7	17	−10	0

16 November 2007
19:30

Portugal	0–0	Italy
	Report

Multiusos Gondomar, Porto
Attendance: 3,300
Referee: Károly Török (Hungary)

16 November 2007
21:30

Czech Republic	4–8	Romania
G. Dobre 15' (o.g.); T. Sluka 18'; L. Rešetár 27'; M. Mareš 30'	Report	R. F. Matei 12', 37', 40' (pen.); C. Gherman 17'; R. Lupu 23' 35'; G. Molomfalean 24'; Lo. Szöcs 32'

Multiusos Gondomar, Porto
Attendance: 1,800
Referee: Oleg Ivanov (Ukraine)

18 November 2007
16:30

Italy	7–1	Romania
C. Morgado 2', 21', 23'; S. Assis 6'; A. Foglia 10', 19'; F. Grana 26'	Report	C. Gherman 14'

Multiusos Gondomar, Porto
Attendance: 1,988
Referee: Roberto Gracia Marin (Spain)

18 November 2007
18:30

Portugal	5–3	Czech Republic
Ricardinho 7'; Gonçalo 15'; Arnaldo 20'; Marcelinho 28'; Formiga 36'	Report	R. Mareš 1', 12'; D. Frič 9'

Multiusos Gondomar, Porto
Attendance: 3,648
Referee: Ivan Shabanov (Russia)

21 November 2007
18:15

Romania	0–3	Portugal
	Report	Ricardinho 1', 25'; Leitão 34'

Multiusos Gondomar, Porto
Attendance: 3,450
Referee: Edi Sunjic (Croatia)

21 November 2007
18:15

Italy	4–0	Czech Republic
S. Zanetti 11'; A. Foglia 23'; A. Fabiano 32'; F. Grana 36'	Report

Pavilhao Municipal Santo Tirso, Porto
Attendance: 900
Referee: Alexandr Remin (Belarus)

==== Group B ====
Team	Pld	W	D	L	GF	GA	GD	Pts
Spain	3	2	1	0	11	4	+7	7
Russia	3	2	0	1	10	8	+2	6
Serbia	3	1	1	1	7	8	−1	4
Ukraine	3	0	0	3	5	13	−8	0

17 November 2007
15:00

Spain	6–2	Ukraine
Marcelo 15', 38'; Kike 17'; Álvaro 27'; Jordi Torras 33'; Daniel 35'	Report	S. Cheporniuk 17', 27'

Multiusos Gondomar, Porto
Attendance: 1,000
Referee: Antonius Van Eekelen (Netherlands)

17 November 2007
17:00

Serbia	3–5	Russia
P. Rajić 24', 31'; M. Perić 26'	Report	Cirilo 2', 15', 34'; D. Khamadiev 24'; V. Shayakhmetov 37'

Multiusos Gondomar, Porto
Attendance: 1,000
Referee: Karel Henych (Czech Republic)

19 November 2007
19:00

Ukraine	1–4	Russia
D. Khamadiev 35' (o.g.)	Report	O. Khursov 20' (o.g.); Cirilo 26' (pen.); V. Shayakhmetov 27'; S. Zuev 36'

Multiusos Gondomar, Porto
Attendance: 748
Referee: Antonio Jose Fernandes Cardoso (Portugal)

19 November 2007
21:00

Spain	1–1	Serbia
Andreu 18'	Report	P. Rajić 40'

Multiusos Gondomar, Porto
Attendance: 1,100
Referee: Vladimir Colbasiuc (Moldova)

21 November 2007
16:15

Russia	1–4	Spain
K. Maevski 6'	Report	Andreu 17'; Daniel 20', 38'; Marcelo 23'

Multiusos Gondomar, Porto
Attendance: 1,313
Referee: Massimo Cumbo (Italy)

21 November 2007
16:15

Ukraine	2–3	Serbia
S. Cheporniuk 21'; S. Sytin 24'	Report	P. Rajić 5', 23'; V. Cvetanović 14'

Pavilhao Municipal Santo Tirso, Porto
Attendance: 850
Referee: Pascal Lemal (Belgium)

=== Knockout stage ===
Semifinals
23 November 2007 – Porto
Italy	2
Russia	0
23 November 2007 – Porto
Spain (p)	2 (4)
Portugal	2 (3)

Final
25 November 2007 – Porto
Italy	1
Spain	3
Third place
25 November 2007 – Porto
Russia	3
Portugal	2

==== Semi-finals ====
23 November 2007
19:00

Italy	2–0	Russia
Grana 3'; A. Fabiano 31'	Report

Multiusos Gondomar, Porto
Attendance: 1,882
Referee: Roberto Gracia Marin (Spain)

23 November 2007
21:00

Spain	2–2	Portugal
Daniel 36'; Andreu 39'	Report	Gonçalo 31'; Ricardinho 35'
Penalties
Kike (penalty scored); Daniel (penalty scored); Jordi Torras (penalty scored); Ortiz (penalty scored)	4–3	(penalty scored) Ricardinho; (penalty missed) Joel Queirós; (penalty scored) Marcelinho; (penalty scored) Ivan; (penalty missed) Leitão

Multiusos Gondomar, Porto
Attendance: 3,900
Referee: Massimo Cumbo (Italy)

==== Third place play-off ====
25 November 2007
16:00

Russia	3–2	Portugal
Cirilo 17'; A. Fukin 18'; V. Shayakhmetov 36'	Report	Gonçalo 15'; Leitão 36'

Multiusos Gondomar, Porto
Attendance: 3,100
Referee: Oleg Ivanov (Ukraine)

==== Final ====
25 November 2007
18:00

Italy	1–3	Spain
A. Feller 30'	Report	Marcelo 9'; Daniel 22'; Javi Rodríguez 27'

Multiusos Gondomar, Porto
Attendance: 3,600
Referee: Antonio Jose Fernandes Cardoso (Portugal)

== Champions ==
UEFA Futsal Championship 2007 winners

Spain
Fourth title

== Tournament ranking ==
Per statistical convention in football, matches decided in extra time are counted as wins and losses, while matches decided by penalty shoot-out are counted as draws.

Pos	Team	Pld	W	D	L	GF	GA	GD	Pts	Final result
1	Spain	5	3	2	0	16	7	+9	11	Champions
2	Italy	5	3	1	1	14	4	+10	10	Runners-up
3	Russia	5	3	0	2	13	12	+1	9	Third place
4	Portugal	5	2	2	1	12	8	+4	8	Fourth place
5	Serbia	3	1	1	1	7	8	–1	4	Eliminated in Group stage
6	Romania	3	1	0	2	9	14	–5	3	Eliminated in Group stage
7	Ukraine	3	0	0	3	5	13	–8	0	Eliminated in Group stage
8	Czech Republic	3	0	0	3	7	17	–10	0	Eliminated in Group stage

== Top goalscorers ==
Scorer	Goals	Nation
Predrag Rajić	5	Serbia
Cirilo	5	Russia
Daniel	5	Spain
Ricardinho	4	Portugal
Marcelo	4	Spain
