= 2008 FIFA Futsal World Cup – final round =

Historical sports event

The 2008 FIFA Futsal World Cup – final round took place from 16 October to 19 October 2008.

== Bracket ==
Semifinals
16 October 2008 - Rio de Janeiro
Russia | 2
Brazil | 4
16 October 2008 - Rio de Janeiro
Spain (a.e.t.) | 3
Italy | 2

Final
19 October 2008 - Rio de Janeiro
Brazil (pen.) | 2 (4)
Spain | 2 (3)
Third place
18 October 2008 - Rio de Janeiro
Russia | 1
Italy | 2

== Matches ==
=== Semi-finals ===
2008-10-16
10:30

| Russia | 2 – 4 | Brazil |
|---|---|---|
| Pula 17'20'; Khamadiev 25'31' | (Report) | 3'45' Schumacher; 7'23' Falcão; 18'01' Vinícius; 37'29' Gabriel |

Ginásio do Maracanãzinho, Rio de Janeiro
Attendance: 4,910
Referee: (Peru) Hector Rojas
2008-10-16
12:30

| Spain | 3 – 2 (a.e.t) | Italy |
|---|---|---|
| Daniel 4'44'; Fernandao 44'24'; Foglia 50'00' (o.g.) | (Report) | 26'34' Foglia; 48'16' Grana |

Ginásio do Maracanãzinho, Rio de Janeiro
Attendance: 5,079
Referee: (Cuba) Antonio Alvarez

=== Match of Third Place ===
2008-10-18
10:30

| Russia | 1 – 2 | Italy |
|---|---|---|
| Dushkevich 25'53' | (Report) | 6'21' Foglia; 39'47' Assis |

Ginásio do Maracanãzinho, Rio de Janeiro
Attendance: 6,887
Referee: (Australia) Scott Kidson

=== Final ===
2008-10-19
10:30

| Brazil | 2 – 2 (a.e.t.) | Spain |
|---|---|---|
| Marquinho 24'15'; Vinícius 36'23' | (Report) | 27'57' Torras; 38'28' Álvaro |
Penalties
| Marquinho (penalty scored); Wilde (penalty scored); Ciço (penalty scored); Lenísio (penalty scored); Ari (penalty missed) | 4 – 3 | (penalty scored) Kike; (penalty scored) Ortiz; (penalty missed) Torras; (penalty scored) Álvaro; (penalty missed) Marcelo |

Ginásio do Maracanãzinho, Rio de Janeiro
Attendance: 10,082
Referee: (Colombia) Fabian Lopez

== Winner ==
FIFA Futsal World Cup
2008 winners

Brazil
Fourth title
