= 2009 Copa de España de Futsal =

2009 Copa de España
Tournament details
- Country: Spain
- Teams: 8

Final positions
- Champions: Inter Movistar
- Runners-up: ElPozo Murcia

Tournament statistics
- Matches played: 7
- Goals scored: 40 (5.71 per match)

The 2009 Copa de España de Fútbol Sala is the 20th staging of the Copa de España de Fútbol Sala. It was held in the Palacio Municipal de Deportes de Granada, in Granada, Spain, between 26 February and 1 March 2009.

== Qualified teams ==
#	Club
1	ElPozo Murcia
2	Inter Movistar
3	Barcelona Mobicat
4	Caja Segovia
5	Playas de Castellón
6	Benicarló Aeroport Castelló
7	Xacobeo Lobelle
8	Carnicer Torrejón

== Final tournament ==
=== Knockout stage ===
Quarter-finals
26 February - Palacio de Deportes
ElPozo Murcia	4
Carnicer Torrejón	1
26 February - Palacio de Deportes
Barcelona Mobicat	5
Benicarló Aeroport Castelló	3
27 February - Palacio de Deportes
Inter Movistar	4
Lobelle Santiago	2
27 February - Palacio de Deportes
Caja Segovia	2
Playas de Castellón	4

Semi-finals
28 February - Palacio de Deportes
ElPozo Murcia	2
Barcelona Mobicat	1
28 February - Palacio de Deportes
Inter Movistar	4
Playas de Castellón	0

Final
1 March - Palacio de Deportes
ElPozo Murcia	3
Inter Movistar	5

=== Quarter-finals ===
26 February 2009	ElPozo Murcia	4–1	Carnicer Torrejón	Granada
19:00 (UTC+1)	Mauricio 12'; Ciço 22'; Wilde 27'; Álvaro 40'	Report	Jaison 40'	Stadium: Palacio de Deportes; Attendance: 4,000; Referee: Peña Díaz, Peña Gómez

26 February 2009	Barcelona	5–3	Benicarló	Granada
21:00 (UTC+1)	Fernandao 22', 40'; Carlos 29'; Javi Rodríguez 39'; Igor 40'	Report	Isco 26'; A. Vadillo 30'; Lolo 33'	Stadium: Palacio de Deportes; Attendance: 4,000; Referee: Cordero Gallardo, Linares López

27 February 2009	Interviú	4–2	Lobelle	Granada
19:00 (UTC+1)	Torras 3'; Schumacher 4', 4', 39'	Report	Alemao 3'; César 30'	Stadium: Palacio de Deportes; Attendance: 4,000; Referee: Rabadán Sáinz, Sánchez Molina

27 February 2009	Caja Segovia	2–4	Playas de Castellón	Granada
21:00 (UTC+1)	Andreu 18'; Matias 38'	Report	Kiko 16'; Rubén 30'; Rafael 32'; Diego Blanco 37'	Stadium: Palacio de Deportes; Attendance: 4,000; Referee: Gutiérrez Lumbreras, Gracia Marín

=== Semi-finals ===
28 February 2009	ElPozo Murcia	2–1 (a.e.t.)	Barcelona	Granada
18:00 (UTC+1)	Wilde 8'; Vinícius 44'	Report	Fernandão 36'	Stadium: Palacio de Deportes; Attendance: 6,500; Referee: Gutiérrez Lumbreras, Gracia Marín

28 February 2009	Interviú	4–0	Playas de Castellón	Granada
20:00 (UTC+1)	Borja 7'; Schumacher 17', 26'; Juanra 37'	Report		Stadium: Palacio de Deportes; Attendance: 6,500; Referee: Cordero Gallardo, Linares López

=== Final ===
1 March 2009	ElPozo Murcia	3–5	Interviú	Granada
18:30 (UTC+1)	Saúl 4'; Álvaro 21'; Wilde 38'	Report	Torras 3'; Schumacher 6', 17'; Betão 31'; Daniel 40'	Stadium: Palacio de Deportes; Attendance: 7,000; Referee: Peña Díaz, Peña Gómez

2009 Copa de España winners
(Community of Madrid)
Inter Movistar
Seventh title

== Top goalscorers ==
Scorer	Club	Goals
(Brazil) Schumacher	Interviú	7
(Brazil) Wilde	ElPozo Murcia	3
(Spain) Fernandao	Barcelona	3
(Spain) Álvaro	ElPozo Murcia	2
(Spain) Torras	Interviú	2
