= Futsal at the Pan American Games =

- No. of events: 1 (men)

The only edition of the Pan American Games at which a futsal event was included was the 2007 Games in Rio de Janeiro, Brazil. The futsal matches were held in Riocentro. Every edition has included football events.

== Results ==
Year	Host	Final			Third place match		
Year	Host	Gold	Score	Silver	Bronze	Score	4th place
2007; Details	(Brazil); Rio de Janeiro	Brazil	4–1	Argentina	Paraguay	6–5 (aet)	Costa Rica

== Medal table ==
Rank	Nation	Gold	Silver	Bronze	Total
1	Brazil	1	0	0	1
2	Argentina	0	1	0	1
3	Paraguay	0	0	1	1
Totals (3 entries)		1	1	1	3

== Medalists ==
Games	Gold	Silver	Bronze
2007 Rio de Janeiro	Brazil; Rogério; Tiago; Neto; Ciço; Gabriel; Vinícius; Leandro Simi; Betão; Lenísio; Marquinho; Falcão; Valdin	Argentina; José Mandayo; Leandro Planas; José Luis Costas; Diego Giustozzi; Carlos Florentino Sánchez; Leandro Cuzzolino; Fernando Wilhelm; Hernán Garcías; Edgardo Amas; Matías Lucuix; Esteban González; Santiago Elias	Paraguay; Carlos Britez; José Santander; Rodolfo Román; Andrés León; Cristian Acuña; Óscar Jara; Horacio Osorio; Cesar Riveros; José Ortíz; Sergio Araujo; Alfredo Ortíz; Carlos Espínola
