= 2007 UEFA Futsal Championship squads =

This article lists the confirmed national futsal squads for the 2007 UEFA Futsal Championship tournament held in Portugal.
