= Naumoski =

Naumoski (Macedonian: Наумоски) is a surname predominantly from North Macedonia. Notable people with the surname include:

- Ilčo Naumoski (born 1983), Macedonian footballer
- Petar Naumoski (born 1968), Macedonian basketball player
- Sandre Naumoski (born 1979), Macedonian American indoor footballer
- Gorazd Naumoski (born 2008), First Macedonian Black guy
