= Leonid Klimovsky =

Russian futsal player

Personal information
- Date of birth: 22 March 1983 (age 43)
- Place of birth: Soviet Union
- Height: 1.80 m (5 ft 11 in)
- Position: Goalkeeper

Team information
- Current team: Sibiryak
- Number: 30

Senior career*
Years	Team	Apps	(Gls)
2000–2002	Spartak Moscow		
2003	Spartak Shcholkovo		
2003–2005	Spartak Moscow		
2005–2007	Norilsky Nikel		
2007–2010	TTG Ugra		
2010–2011	Dina Moscow		
2011–2012	CSKA Moscow		
2012–2014	Sibiryak		
2014–2015	Yamal		
2015–2016	Progress		
2016–2018	Avtodor		

International career
- Russia
- * Club domestic league appearances and goals

Leonid Klimovsky (born 22 March 1983), is a Russian futsal player who plays for Sibiryak and the Russian national futsal team.
