= Alexandre Feller =

Brazilian futsal player

Personal information
- Full name: Alexandre Feller
- Date of birth: 28 September 1971 (age 55)
- Place of birth: Nova Trento, Brazil
- Position: Goalkeeper

Team information
- Current team: Marca Futsal

Senior career*
Years	Team	Apps	(Gls)
2003–05	Prato		
2005–08	Luparense		
2008–09	Arzignano		
2009–	Marca Futsal		

International career
–	Italy	55	(1)
- * Club domestic league appearances and goals

Alexandre Feller (born 28 September 1971) is a Brazilian futsal player who plays for Marca Futsal as a goalkeeper.

Alexandre Feller is a member of the Italian national futsal team.

== Honours ==
- Leagues: 2
  - Luparense: 2006–2007, 2007–2008
- Coppa Italia: 4
  - Prato: 2003-2004
  - Luparense: 2005–2006, 2007–2008
  - Arzignano: 2008-2009
- Supercoppa Italiana: 1
  - Luparense: 2007
