= Sergey Zuev =

Russian futsal player (born 1980)

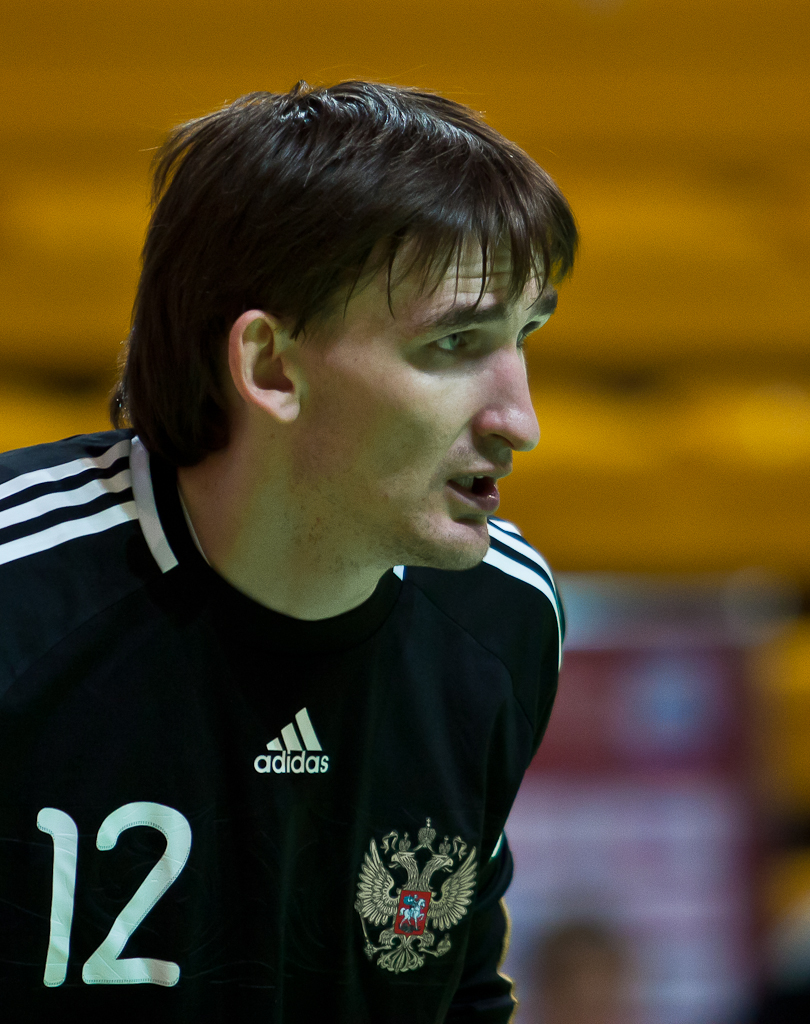
- Sergey Zuev in 2011

Personal information
- Full name: Sergey Nikolayevich Zuev
- Date of birth: 20 February 1980 (age 46)
- Place of birth: Severouralsk, Sverdlovsk Oblast, Russian SFSR
- Height: 1.83 m (6 ft 0 in)
- Position: Goalkeeper

Senior career*
Years	Team	Apps	(Gls)
1997—2001	MFK UPI-DDT		
2001—2014	MFK Viz-Sinara		
2014—2017	Dina Moscow		

International career
2002—2012	Russia	63	(1)
- * Club domestic league appearances and goals as of April 2, 2015

Sergey Nikolayevich Zuev (Russian: Сергей Николаевич Зуев; February 20, 1980, Severouralsk, USSR) is a Russian futsal player. He plays as a goalkeeper for the Moscow club Dina Moscow, and formerly played in the Russian national futsal team. Following the results of eight seasons he was voted the best goalkeeper of the Russian championship, and after 2008 he was voted world’s best goalkeeper. Master of Sports (since March 27, 2012).

== Biography ==
=== Youth ===
Zuev was born in Severouralsk - a small town in the Sverdlovsk region. When he was seven years old, his parents took him to a local hockey club. For a long time, Sergei played hockey as a goalkeeper, took part in various regional competitions.

When I was 14-15 years old I already played in the adult team in the hockey championship. The team was about to leave for a competition, and there were no goalies, one was drunk, another had feaver. That's how I started. We lost either 1: 4, or 1: 5 ... After that I was afraid of nothing. [2]

When playing hockey, Sergey often played futsal at training sessions. Being a part of futsal club "Smena" from his native city, he won the championship of Russia among the teams of his age. On his way home, his head coach of the futsal team UPI Sergey Bannikov, who offered Zuev to become part of the OIP and to pursue a career in his club, was waiting for Sergey at the Yekaterinburg railway station.

=== UPI ===
Zuev’s debut for the students’ team within the Premier League of the Russian mini-football took place in 1997/98. That season he took part in only two games, but in the following season he took part in 25 matches and even scored a goal to the gate of Ugra TSH. Sergey won a place of the first goalkeeper and then was rarely changed at the gate with his colleague, who was also his roommate - Nicholas Bezruchenko. In 2000 Zuev became a member of Russian national team at Student World Cup in Brazil.

My knees trembled, perhaps once - in 2000 we went to Brazil with a student. The rival played with its strongest composition: Vander Carioca, Tobias ... And in the third match I went to the field within the starting lineup, there were 9 and a half thousand people on the tribunes – I had never seen that much fans before. That's when I was a little trembling.

The Russian team won bronze at that tournament, and that success brought to Sergei the title of Master of Sports.

=== Viz-Sinara and the national team ===
In summer 2001, Zuev moved to another club of Yekaterinburg - VIZ. That club applied to the highest positions. Young goalkeeper immediately took his place in the goal. Due to his game VIZ took the second place in the regular championship and reached the play-off semifinal. According to the final results the Yekaterinburg club became only the fourth, but Zuev had a bright season and was recognized the best goalkeeper of the tournament.

On March 20, 2002 Zuev first played in the Russian national futsal team in an exhibition game against Argentina. In August, Sergey once again became a member of a student team at the Student World Cup, but this time the Russians won the champion’s title. Zuev was keeping the goal in most of the games, including the final against Italy. And at the end of the same year Sergei debuted in official matches of the first national team, replacing Alexei Yevteyev in a qualifying game of the European Championship 2003 against Israel.

In the next season Zuev helped "Viz-Sinara" to win the bronze medal and was again voted the best goalkeeper of the championship. A similar situation (bronze for the club and recognition at the end of the season) repeated in the next two seasons. Yekaterinburg club won silver twice, and in 2007 it won its first trophy after beating Moscow club Dinamo in the final of the Cup of Russia. Zuev was keeping the goal of "Viz-Sinara" in both finals and in the penalty shootout.

While working on improving himself in the club Sergei took the position of the first goalkeeper of Russia. He became the part of the European Championship even 2003, but he ended badly for the Russians. But in 2005 and 2007 respectively, the Russian team won the silver and bronze European Championship, and it was her first Zuev goalkeeper at these tournaments.

=== Victories in Russia and Europe ===
In the season 2007/08, "Viz-Sinara" held its debut in the UEFA Cup on mini-football. At the first dash the Ekaterinburg club managed to get out of the group stage. In the semifinal Yekaterinburg competed with Kazakhstan "Kairat" and reached the final of the tournament, where they met with the Spanish "El Pozo". The overtime did not reveal the winner, he had to be determined in a penalty shootout. Sergey Zuev became the hero of that series, repulsing three penalties and bringing to his team the title of the strongest in Europe.

In the end of 2008, Zuev as a part of the national team took part in the World Cup of his career. The Russian team took the fourth place, and Sergei was the first goalkeeper of the team. It was for his play in the tournament, as well as in the victorious UEFA Cup mini-football, that he was named the best goalkeeper of the world in 2008, according to the «UMBRO Futsal Awards».

In the 2008/09 season, "Viz-Sinara" managed to break the hegemony of the Moscow "Dinamo" club and to become the champion of Russia in mini-football. Yekaterinburg repeated its success a year later. Following the results of the two championship seasons Zuev was recognized as the best goalkeeper of the championship of Russia. He was declared the best in the 2010/11 season, when Yekaterinburg took the second place. That made Sergei the eight-time winner of the award, which is a record result.

== Achievements ==
- UEFA Cup Winner 2007/08
- Champion of Russia (2): 2008/09, 2009/10
- Russian Cup Winner: 2007
- Silver medalist of UEFA Futsal Championship (2): 2005, 2012
- Bronze medalist of UEFA Futsal Championship, 2007
- Semifinalist of FIFA Futsal World Cup, 2008
- Winner of the student FIFA Futsal World Cup, 2002

=== Personal achievements ===
- The best goalkeeper of Russian League: of the championship of Russia (8): 2001/02, 2002/03, 2003/04, 2004/05, 2007/08, 2008/09, 2009/10, 2010/11
