= Ahmed El Agouz =

Egyptian footballer, manager, and analyst

Personal information
- Date of birth: 23 July 1966 (age 60)
- Place of birth: Sharqia, Egypt

Team information
- Current team: Ismaily (Football Director)

Managerial career
- Years: Team
- 2010: Ismaily (Assistant)
- 2010–2011: El Minya
- 2011: Al-Khaleej
- 2012–2013: Ismaily (Youth head coach)
- 2013: Ismaily (Assistant)
- 2013–2014: Ismaily
- 2016: Tala'ea El Gaish
- 2017: El Raja
- 2020: Al Mareekh
- 2020–2020: Ismaily (General Manager)
- 2020–: Ismaily (Football Director)

Ahmed El Agouz (Arabic: احمد العجوز; born 23 July 1966) is an Egyptian football manager. In 2020, he was appointed as the General coach of Ismaily SC.

== Managerial statistics ==
As of 4 September 2020

Managerial record by team and tenure
Team	From	To	Record					Ref.
Team	From	To	P	W	D	L	Win %	Ref.
El Minya SC	10 October 2010	24 July 2011	0	0	0	0	—	
Al-Khaleej	29 July 2011	5 November 2011	6	2	1	3	33.3	
Ismaily SC	17 December 2013	20 February 2014	9	4	4	1	44.4	
Tala'ea El Gaish SC	10 September 2016	5 November 2016	7	3	4	0	42.9	
El Raja SC	10 September 2016	5 November 2016	1	0	0	1	0.0	
Al Mareekh FC	6 January 2020	4 September 2020	6	3	3	0	50.0	
Total			28	12	12	4	42.9	—
