= Jan Janovský =

Czech futsal player

Janovský
Personal information
- Full name: Jan Janovský
- Date of birth: 20 June 1985 (age 41)
- Place of birth: Havířov, Czechoslovakia
- Position: Winger

Team information
- Current team: Rekord Bielsko-Biała

International career
Years	Team	Apps	(Gls)
- Czech Republic

Jan Janovský (born 20 June 1985), is a Czech futsal player who plays for Rekord Bielsko-Biała and the Czech Republic national futsal team.
