= Andreu Linares =

Spanish futsal player

Andreu
Personal information
- Full name: Andreu Linares Rodríguez
- Date of birth: 24 February 1975 (age 51)
- Place of birth: Barcelona, Spain
- Positions: Flank; Pivot

Senior career*
Years	Team	Apps	(Gls)
1993–1998	Barcelona		
1998–2000	Talavera		
2000–2001	Playas de Castellón		
2001–2002	Miró Martorell		
2002–2008	Interviú		
2008–2010	Caja Segovia		

International career
- Spain

Managerial career
- 2010–: Bargas
- * Club domestic league appearances and goals

Andreu Linares Rodríguez (born 24 February 1975) is a former Spanish futsal player, best known for his spell with Inter Movistar as a flank / pivot.

== Honours ==
=== Club ===
- 5 Spanish Championship winner (2000/01, 2002/03, 2003/04, 2004/05, 2007/08)
- 4 Spanish Supercup winner (1998/99, 2001/02, 2005/06, 2007/08)
- 3 Spanish Cup winner (03/04, 04/05, 06/07)
- 4 Intercontinental Cup winner (2005, 2006, 2007, 2008)
- 2 Copa Iberica winner (2003/04, 2005/06)
- 1 Recopa de Europa (2008)
- 3 UEFA Futsal Cup winner (2001, 2004, 2006)

=== Spain ===
- "4 Nations Tournament" winner (1996 and 1997)
- FIFA Trophy (1999, 2001)
- FIFA World Futsal Championship (2004) Winner
- FIFA Futsal World Championship (2008) runner-up
- UEFA Futsal Championship (2005, 2007) Winner
- UEFA Futsal Championship (1999) runner-up

=== Individual ===
- Best left flank of LNFS (1999/00 and 2000/01)
- Best young player of LNFS (1996/97)
