= Prasert Innui =

Thai futsal player

Personal information
- Date of birth: 31 July 1978 (age 48)
- Place of birth: Phatthalung, Thailand
- Height: 1.70 m (5 ft 7 in)
- Position: Striker

International career^{‡}
Years	Team	Apps	(Gls)
2002–2011	Thailand Futsal	57	(52)
- ‡ National team caps and goals as of 13:05, 23 May 2008 (UTC)

Prasert Innui (Thai: ประเสริฐ อินนุ้ย, born 31 July 1978) is a Thai former futsal striker.

He competed for Thailand at the 2004 and 2008 FIFA Futsal World Cup finals.
