= Andy Rosenband =

American soccer player

Personal information
- Full name: Andrew Lee "Lil' Shush" Rosenband
- Date of birth: April 27, 1981 (age 45)
- Place of birth: Hammond, Indiana, U.S.
- Height: 5 ft 7 in (1.70 m)
- Position: Midfielder

College career
Years	Team	Apps	(Gls)
1999–2000	Wake Forest Demon Deacons	31	(4)
2001–2002	Ohio State Buckeyes		

Senior career*
Years	Team	Apps	(Gls)
2003	Dallas Burn	0	(0)
2004	Charleston Battery	4	(0)
2004	Milwaukee Wave United	4	(0)
2004–2009	Chicago Storm (indoor)	123	(43)
2005	Chicago Fire	0	(0)
2005	→ Chicago Fire Reserves (loan)	5	(2)

International career
2008	United States futsal	4	(1)
2009	United States Maccabiah Games team	5	(3)
- * Club domestic league appearances and goals as of January 28, 2009

Andy Rosenband (born April 27, 1981) is an American retired soccer midfielder.

== Biography ==
A native of Hammond, Indiana, Rosenband played high school soccer for the University of Chicago Laboratory School where he scored 115 career goals and was a two time ISL conference player-of-the-year. He was named to the Chicago Tribune and Chicago Sun-Times Illinois All-State Soccer Teams.

He played college soccer at Wake Forest University from 1999 to 2000 and at Ohio State University from 2001 to 2002. As a freshman and sophomore for Wake Forest, Rosenband played in 31 matches for the Demon Deacons, scoring four goals and four assists. He was named to the Collegiate Soccer News Team of the Week Sept. 12–19 in 1999. Rosenband transferred to Ohio State prior to his junior year where he led the Buckeyes in points (14), shots (36) and shots on goal (19). Following a senior season in which he again led the team in points (20), Rosenband was named to the Great Lakes All-Region Second Team and the Big Ten All-Conference Second Team.

== Professional career ==
In January 2003, he was drafted by the Dallas Burn 52nd overall in the 2003 MLS SuperDraft of Major League Soccer. Released in September 2003, Rosenband signed with the Charleston Battery and later that season played for the Milwaukee Wave United both of the USL First Division. In 2004, Rosenband was signed by the Chicago Storm of the Major Indoor Soccer League. In the Storm's inaugural season, he played in 37 games scoring 12 goals and seven assists for 19 points and blocked 13 shots. At the end of the 2004–05 season, Chicago Storm lost the rights to Rosenband to the California Cougars in the MISL expansion draft. In 2005, he played for the Chicago Fire Reserves of the MLS scoring two goals in five games and was signed by the Chicago Fire for the remainder of the 2005 season.

Later in 2005, the Chicago Storm re-acquired Rosenband in a trade with the California Cougars that sent John Ball and the rights to Kevin Sakuda to California for target man Anthony Maher and the rights to Rosenband. He re-signed with the Storm on March 14, 2006, and played eight games scoring two goals and one assist. Following the conclusion of the season, Rosenband signed a contract extension through the 2008–09 season.

During the Storm's 2006–07 season, Rosenband reached a career high in points (29) and tied for second in the league in shorthanded goals (1). He played in 29 games scoring 11 goals and 6 assists helping the team to its first post-season win in franchise history.

After the 2007 season, Rosenband was selected to the USA Futsal team for matches held in South America. He was named as an alternate for Futsal Team USA during the 2007 Pan-American Games. In 2008, Rosenband was selected as member of the USA National Futsal Team, and qualified for the 2008 FIFA Futsal World Cup held in Brazil. Rosenband scored the opening goal against Italy.

In 2009, Rosenband was selected to the US National Maccabi team and named captain for the Maccabi Games. Rosenband scored three goals in international play. Following the Maccabi Games, Rosenband retired from professional soccer.

== Post-retirement ==
In 2009, Rosenband founded Morgan Li, a retail store fixture and hospitality furniture manufacturer in Chicago Heights, Illinois, that was named to Chicago Crain's Business Fast 50 in 2018 and 2019. In 2019, Rosenband was named to Crain's Chicago Business 40 under 40.

Rosenband also serves on the board of the Illinois Action for Children.
