= Jardel (futsal player) =

Portuguese futsal player

Personal information
- Full name: Bruno Miguel de Almeida Lima Gomes Bernardo
- Date of birth: 9 November 1979 (age 46)
- Place of birth: Lisbon, Portugal
- Height: 1.89 m (6 ft 2 in)
- Positions: Pivot; winger

Team information
- Current team: Belenenses
- Number: 23

Youth career
- 1993–1996: Mem Martins (football)

Senior career*
Years	Team	Apps	(Gls)
1999–2002	Mem Martins		
2002	Real Massamá		
2002–2005	Sassoeiros		
2005–2007	Benfica		
2007–2011	Belenenses		
2011–2012	Real Rieti		
2012–2013	Nikars		
2014–2016	Olivais		
2018–2019	Belenenses		

International career^{‡}
2008–2009	Portugal	28	(7)
- * Club domestic league appearances and goals as of 00:00, 16 May 2019 (UTC) ‡ National team caps and goals as of 00:00, 16 May 2019 (UTC)

Bruno Miguel de Almeida Lima Gomes Bernardo (born 9 November 1979), known as Jardel, is a Portuguese futsal player who plays as a pivot and winger for Belenenses Jardel was capped 28 times for the Portugal national team and competed in the 2008 FIFA Futsal World Cup.
