= Yosniel Mesa =

Cuban footballer (born 1981)

Personal information
- Full name: Yuniel Mesa Diaz
- Date of birth: 11 May 1981 (age 45)
- Place of birth: Cienfuegos, Cuba
- Height: 1.72 m (5 ft 8 in)
- Position: Midfielder

Senior career*
Years	Team	Apps	(Gls)
–2011	Cienfuegos		

International career
2004–2008	Cuba (futsal)		
2010–2011	Cuba	6	(0)
- * Club domestic league appearances and goals

Yosniel Mesa Díaz (born 11 May 1981) is a Cuban retired football and futsal player.

== Club career ==
Nicknamed Capi, Mesa played for his native provincial team Cienfuegos. After his defection he trained with Fort Lauderdale Strikers.

== International career ==
Mesa played in the 2004 and 2008 FIFA Futsal World Cup tournaments representing Cuba in both.

He made his senior international debut for Cuba in a November 2010 Caribbean Cup qualification match against Grenada and has earned a total of 6 caps, scoring no goals. Later, he was involved in the 2010 Caribbean Cup tournament and made one appearance, as a substitute against Guadeloupe in the 83rd minute replacing Leonel Duarte.

He appeared with the Cuba national football team for the 2011 CONCACAF Gold Cup before defecting to the United States during the tournament.

== Personal life ==
=== Defection to the United States ===
After losing to Mexico on 9 June 2011, Mesa left his Charlotte hotel at dawn through a fire escape and joined his uncle Julio (also a defector himself) who was waiting in his car outside the hotel. The pair then drove off to Julio's house in Miami.
