= Konstantin Agapov =

Russian futsal player

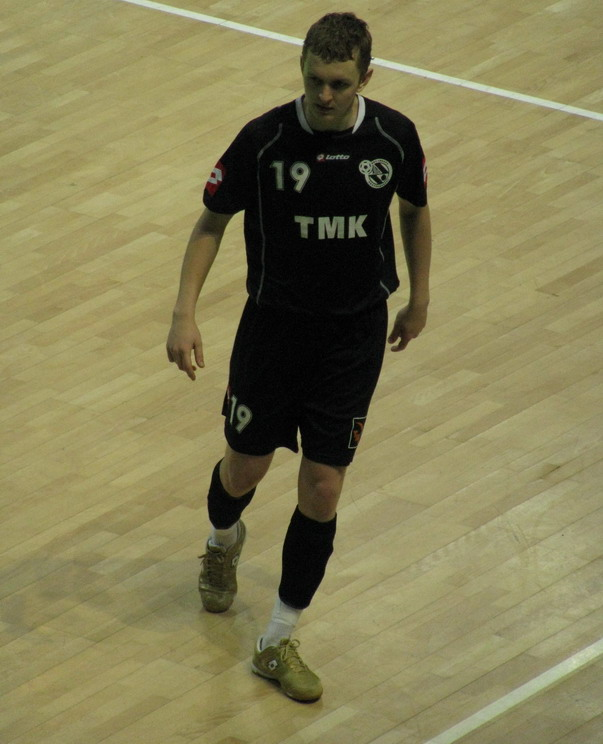

Personal information
- Full name: Konstantin Michailovich Agapov
- Date of birth: 18 October 1986 (age 40)
- Place of birth: Russia
- Position: universal

Team information
- Current team: FC Ural Yekaterinburg (conditioning coach)

Senior career*
Years	Team	Apps	(Gls)
2004–2019	VIZ-Sinara		
2015	→ Dina Moscow (loan)		

Managerial career
- 2021: FC Ural Yekaterinburg (scout)
- 2021–: FC Ural Yekaterinburg (conditioning)
- * Club domestic league appearances and goals

Konstantin Agapov (born 18 October 1986) is a Russian football coach and a former futsal player. He is a conditioning coach with FC Ural Yekaterinburg.

== Playin career ==
Apagov spent most past of his career in VIZ-Sinara, famous Russian futsal club from Yekaterinburg. In 2007 Agapov helped VIZ to win Russian Futsal Cup for the first time. One year later he scored one of the shootout penalties in the final of the 2007–08 UEFA Futsal Cup.

Agapov made his debut in Russian national team in 2007 in friendly match against Iran. Next year he was a member of the Russian team participating in the Futsal world championship, where the Russian side achieved semifinal.

In 2015 Agapov moved to Dina Moscow, the most titled club of Russian futsal. On March 7 he scored his first goal for Dina in the match against Politech.

== Achievements ==
- UEFA Cup winner: 2007/08
- Russian Superleague champion: 2008/09, 2009/10
- Russian Cup winner: 2007
- World championship semifinal: 2008
