= Cirilo (futsal player) =

Brazilian-Russian footballer (born 1980)

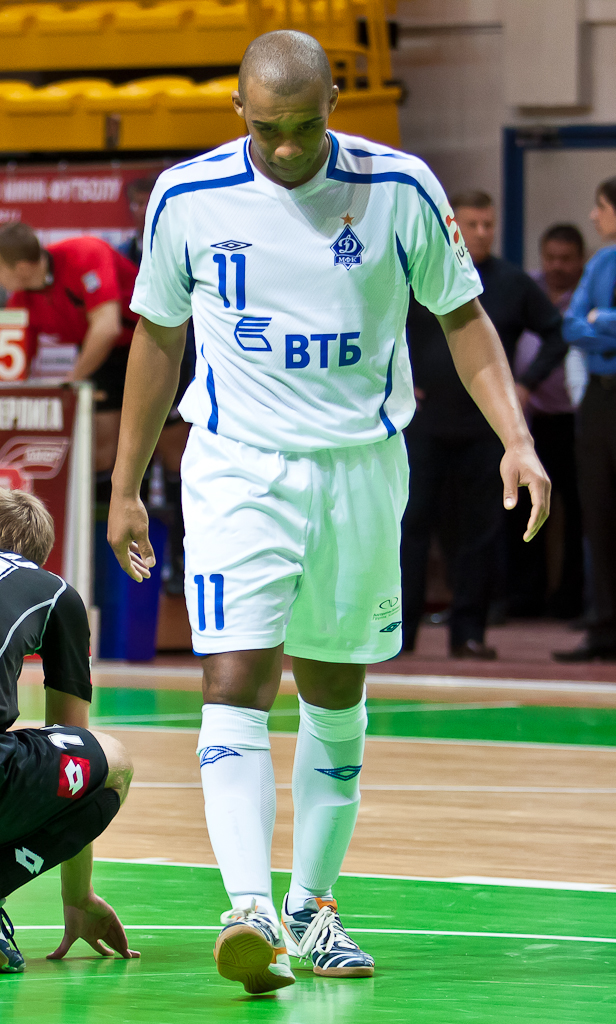
- Cirilo with Dinamo Moskva in 2011

Personal information
- Full name: Cirilo Tadeus Cardoso Filho
- Date of birth: 20 January 1980 (age 46)
- Place of birth: São Paulo, Brazil
- Height: 1.83 m (6 ft 0 in)
- Position: Pivot

Team information
- Current team: MFK KPRF
- Number: 11

Senior career*
Years	Team	Apps	(Gls)
2000	São Caetano		
2001–2002	Ulbra		
2003	Joinville		
2003–2004	Spartak		
2004–2017	Dinamo Moskva		
2017–2018	MFK KPRF		

International career
2006–2014	Russia	37	(29)
- * Club domestic league appearances and goals

Cirilo Tadeus Cardoso Filho, commonly known as Cirilo (Russian: Сирило; born 20 January 1980), is a Brazilian-Russian futsal player of Brazilian origin. He was a member of the Russian national futsal team.

== Honours ==
- Russian Futsal Super League champion (7): 2005, 2006, 2007, 2008, 2011, 2012, 2013
- UEFA Futsal Cup winner: 2006–07
- Russian Futsal Cup winner (6): 2004, 2008, 2009, 2010, 2011, 2013
- Russian Futsal Super Cup winner: 2003
- UEFA Futsal Championship third place: 2007
- FIFA Futsal World Cup fourth place: 2008
