= Luis Amado (futsal player) =

Spanish futsal player

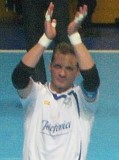

Personal information
- Full name: Luis Amado Tarodo
- Date of birth: 4 May 1976 (age 50)
- Place of birth: Madrid, Spain
- Position: Goalkeeper

Team information
- Current team: Inter Movistar

Senior career*
Years	Team	Apps	(Gls)
1995–1996	Caja Segovia		
1996–1997	At. Madrid Leganés		
1997–2001	Caja Segovia		
2001–	Inter Movistar	342	(16)

International career
	Spain	134	
- * Club domestic league appearances and goals

Luis Amado (born 4 May 1976 in Arganda del Rey, Madrid) is a Spanish futsal player who plays for Inter Movistar as a goalkeeper.

== Honours ==
- 135 times international
- 6 League Championships (98/99, 01/02, 02/03, 03/04, 04/05, 07/08)
- 7 Cup Championships (97/98, 98/99, 99/00, 03/04, 04/05, 06/07, 08/09)
- 9 Supercups (98/99, 99/00, 00/01, 01/02, 02/03, 03/04, 05/06, 07/08, 08/09)
- 3 UEFA Futsal Cup (99/00, 03/04, 05/06)
- 5 Intercontinental Cups (2000, 2005, 2006, 2007, 2008)
- 1 Recopa of Europe (2008)
- 2 cups Iberian (03/04, 05/06)
- 2 World Championships (00 Guatemala, Taiwan Taipei 04)
- 1 runner World Cup (Brazil 2008)
- 5 UEFA Futsal Championship (2001, 2005, 2007, 2010, 2012)
- Runner Euro (Spain 99)
- FIFA Champion Tournament (Singapore 01)
- Centenary Tournament Champion R. Madrid (Torrejon 02)
- Voted Best European Goalkeeper Picks (Russia 01)
- 1 Having chosen Best Player of the LNFS (07/08)
- 7 Times Voted Best Goalkeeper of the LNFS (98/99, 99/00, 00/01, 03/04, 04/05, 06/07, 07/08)
- Best goalkeeper of the World 2003-2004 season
