= Fernando Wilhelm =

Argentine former futsal player

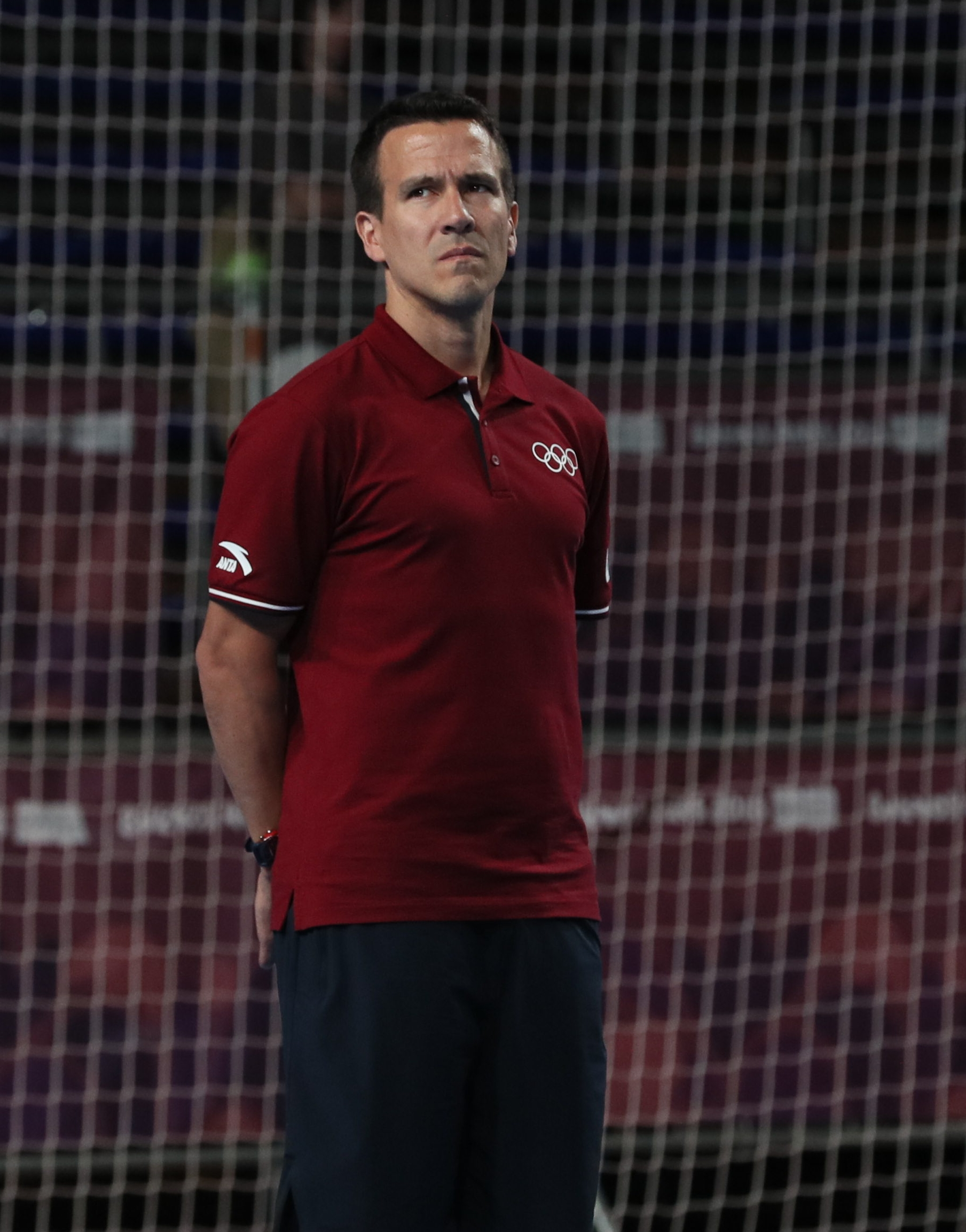
- Wilhelm in 2018

Personal information
- Full name: Fernando Ariel Wilhelm
- Date of birth: 5 April 1982 (age 44)
- Place of birth: Buenos Aires, Argentina
- Height: 1.77 m (5 ft 10 in)
- Position: Forward

Senior career*
Years	Team	Apps	(Gls)
1999–2001	Club Glorias		
2002–2004	River Plate		
2005–2008	Arzignano	67	(43)
2008–2013	Marca		
2013–2015	Asti		
2015–2017	Benfica		

International career
- Argentina
Medal record
Representing Argentina
Men's Futsal
FIFA Futsal World Cup
Winner	2016 Colombia
Copa América
Winner	2003 Paraguay
Winner	2015 Ecuador
Confederations Cup
Winner	2014 Kuwait
- * Club domestic league appearances and goals

Fernando Ariel Wilhelm (born 5 April 1982) is a former Argentine professional futsal player who played as a forward.

In 2016, he won the FIFA Futsal World Cup with Argentina and was awarded the competition's Golden Ball.

== Honours ==
=== Club ===
Benfica

- Taça de Portugal de Futsal: 2016–17
- Supertaça de Portugal: 2015, 2016

=== International ===
Argentina

- FIFA Futsal World Cup: 2016
- Copa América de Futsal: 2003, 2015
- Futsal Confederations Cup: 2014

=== Individual ===
- FIFA Futsal World Cup Golden Ball: 2016
