= Michal Mareš =

Czech futsal player

M. Mareš
Personal information
- Full name: Michal Mareš
- Date of birth: 3 February 1976 (age 50)
- Place of birth: Prague, Czechoslovakia
- Position: Winger

Team information
- Current team: Era-Pack Chrudim

International career
Years	Team	Apps	(Gls)
- Czech Republic

Michal Mareš (born 3 February 1976), is a Czech futsal player who plays for Era-Pack Chrudim and the Czech Republic national futsal team.
