= Roman Mareš =

Czech futsal player

Mareš
Personal information
- Full name: Roman Mareš
- Date of birth: 15 March 1975 (age 51)
- Place of birth: Havlíčkův Brod, Czechoslovakia
- Height: 1.70 m (5 ft 7 in)
- Position: Winger

Team information
- Current team: Era-Pack Chrudim

Senior career*
Years	Team	Apps	(Gls)
- Pramen Havlickuv Brod
- Dina Moscow
- Era-Pack Chrudim

International career
- Czech Republic
- * Club domestic league appearances and goals

Roman Mareš (born 15 March 1975), is a Czech futsal player who plays for Era-Pack Chrudim and the Czech Republic national futsal team.
