= Sandre Naumoski =

Macedonian American indoor soccer player

Personal information
- Full name: Sandre Naumoski
- Date of birth: 3 July 1979 (age 47)
- Place of birth: Yugoslavia

Team information
- Current team: Philadelphia KiXX

Sandre Naumoski (born 3 July 1979 in Skopje, SR Macedonia, present day North Macedonia) is a Macedonian American indoor soccer player. He currently plays in the MISL. He stands 5' 8" at 160 lbs. Naumoski is noted for playing midfield with the Philadelphia Kixx of the MISL II. He had stayed with the KiXX for the 2007–2008 MISL II season with fellow Macedonian Dino Delevski, who was traded to the Monterrey La Raza early in the season.
