= Borja Blanco =

Spanish futsal player

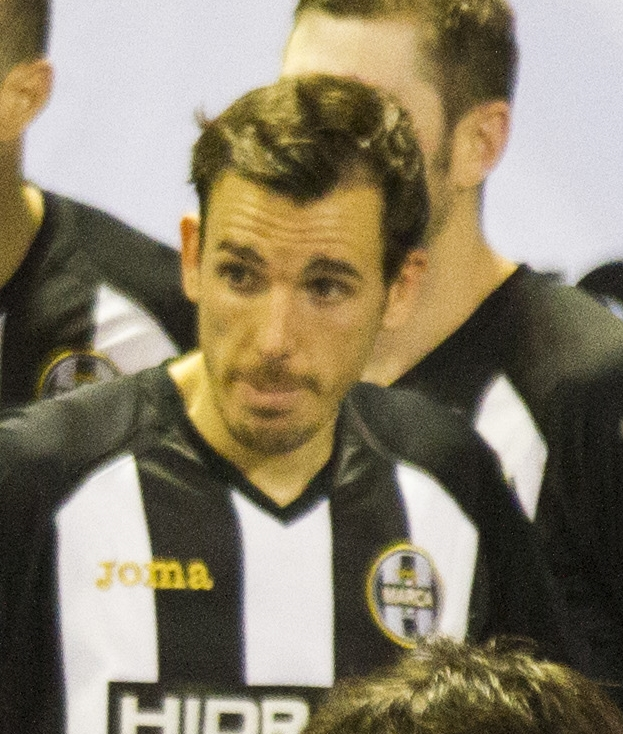
- Borja in 2013

Personal information
- Full name: Borja Blanco Gil
- Date of birth: 16 November 1984 (age 41)
- Place of birth: Madrid, Spain
- Position: Ala

Senior career*
Years	Team	Apps	(Gls)
2004–2008	PSG Móstoles	98	(64)
2008–2011	Inter Movistar	102	(32)
2011–2012	Caja Segovia	35	(26)
2012–2013	Marca Futsal		

International career
	Spain	83	
- * Club domestic league appearances and goals

Borja Blanco Gil (born 16 November 1984), commonly known as Borja, is a Spanish futsal player who plays for Marca Futsal as an Ala.

== Honours ==
- 1 UEFA Futsal Championship (2007, 2010)
- 1 runner FIFA World Cup (2008)
- 1 Supercopa de España (2009)
- 1 Copa de España (2009)
- 1 Copa Intercontinental (2011)
- 1 UEFA Futsal Cup (2009)
- 1 U-21 UEFA Futsal Championship (2005)
- 1 best Winger-Forward of the LNFS (07/08)
- 1 player revelation LNFS (05/06)
- MVP of the Copa de España (Cuenca 2008)
