= Valeriy Zamyatin =

Ukrainian futsal player

Zamyatin
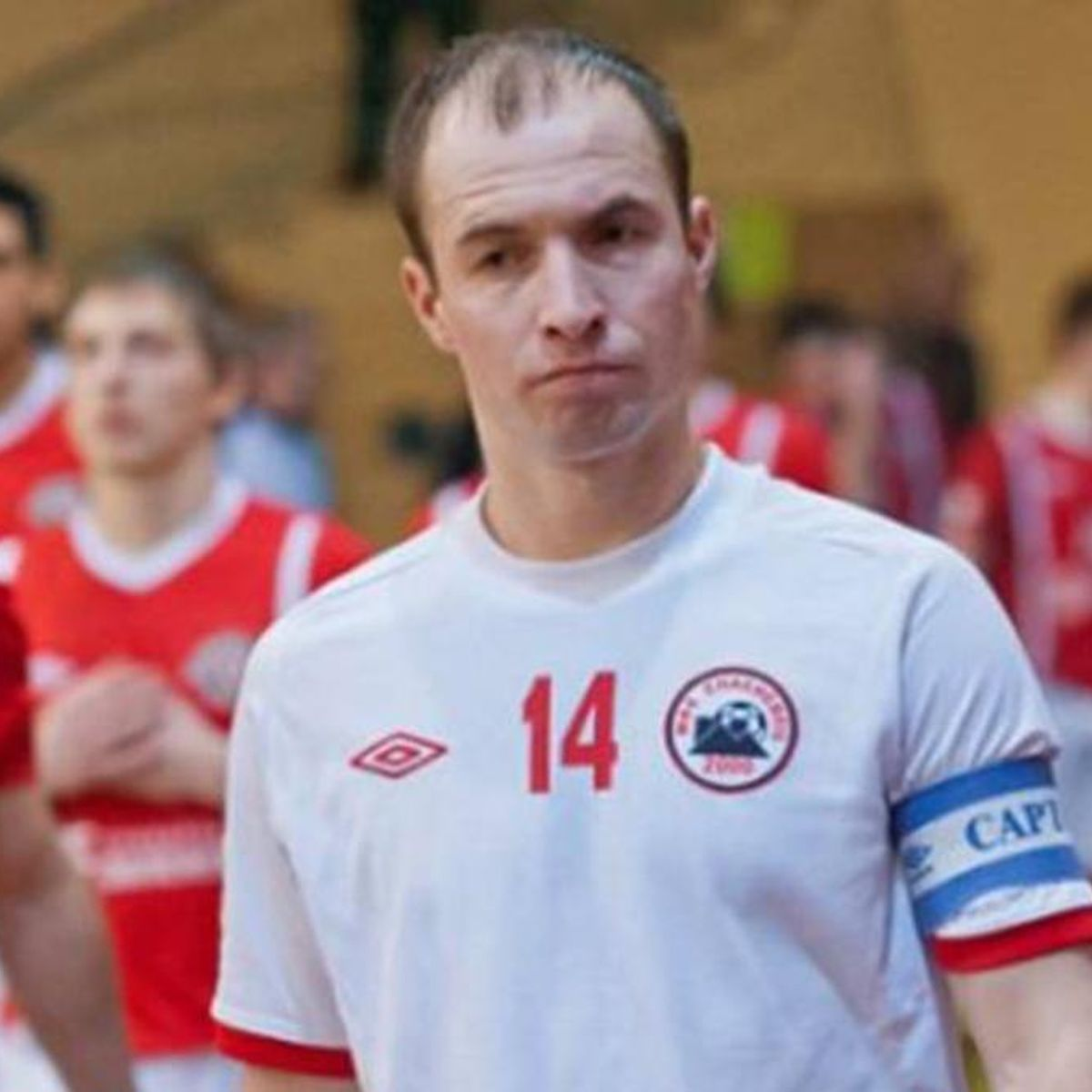

Personal information
- Full name: Valeriy Zamyatin
- Date of birth: 5 January 1979 (age 47)
- Place of birth: Soviet Union
- Position: Defender

Team information
- Current team: Enakievez Enakievo

International career
| Years | Team | Apps | (Gls) |
- Ukraine

Valeriy Zamyatin (born 5 January 1979), is a Ukrainian futsal player who plays for Enakievez Enakievo and the Ukraine national futsal team.
