= Fernando Leitão =

Brazilian-born Portuguese futsal player

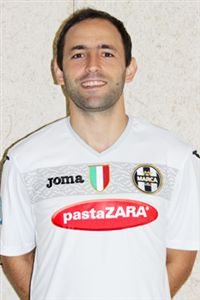
- Fernando Leitao with Acqua e Sapone in 2013

Personal information
- Full name: Fernando Gomes Leitão
- Date of birth: 3 January 1981 (age 45)
- Place of birth: São Paulo, Brazil
- Height: 1.78 m (5 ft 10 in)
- Position: Pivot

Youth career
- 1988–1991: Palmeiras
- 1992–1993: A Hebraica
- 1994–1995: Euroexport
- 1995–1998: Botucatuense
- 1999–2001: Atlético Mineiro

Senior career*
Years	Team	Apps	(Gls)
2002–2003	Minas		
2003	Banespa		
2004	Caxias do Sul		
2004–2007	Carnicer Torrejón		
2007–2010	Santiago		
2010–2013	Sporting CP	83	(44)
2013	Marca Futsal		
2013–2015	Acqua e Sapone		
2015–2016	Luparense		
2016–2019	FP Halle-Gooik		
2019–2020	Orchies Pévèle		
2020–2021	Litija		
2021	C.M.B.		
2021–2022	Sala Consilina		

International career^{‡}
2007–2014	Portugal	79	(31)
- * Club domestic league appearances and goals as of 00:00, 10 August 2018 (UTC) ‡ National team caps and goals as of 00:00, 10 August 2018 (UTC)

Fernando Gomes Leitão (born 3 January 1981) is a Brazilian born Portuguese former futsal player who played as a pivot for different European teams, mainly for Sporting CP, Acqua e Sapone, Halle-Gooik and FC Litija and the Portugal national team.

== Honours ==
Minas

- Copa Latina de Futsal: 2001–02, 2002–03

Carnicer Torrejón

- Copa Comunidad de Madrid: 2006–07

Santiago

- Copa Galicia: 2008–09
- International Tournament of Porto: 2007–08

Sporting CP

- Portuguese Futsal First Division: 2010–11, 2012–13
- Portuguese Futsal Cup: 2010–11, 2012–13
- Portuguese Futsal Supercup: 2010

Acqua e Sapone

- Coppa Italia: 2013–14
- Supercoppa italiana: 2014

Halle-Gooik

- Belgian Futsal Division 1: 2016–17, 2017–18, 2018–19
- Belgian Cup: 2015–16, 2017–18, 2018–19
- Belgian Super Cup: 2016, 2017, 2018
- BeNeCup: 2016
