= Dmitri Prudnikov =

Russian futsal player

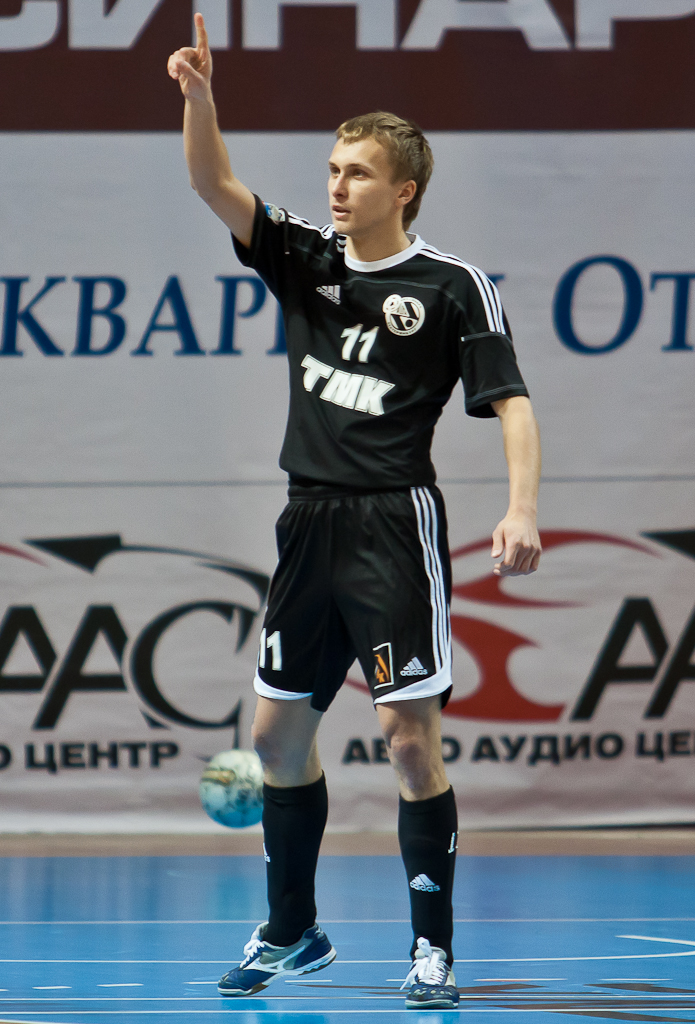
- Prudnikov in 2012

Personal information
- Date of birth: 6 January 1988 (age 38)
- Place of birth: Krasnoturyinsk, Sverdlovsk Oblast, RSFSR, Soviet Union
- Height: 1.76 m (5 ft 9 1/2 in)
- Position: Defender

Team information
- Current team: MFK Ukhta
- Number: 11

Senior career*
Years	Team	Apps	(Gls)
2004–2013	Sinara	207	(140)
2013–2017	Dina Moscow	47	(32)
2017–2023	Sinara		
2023–	Ukhta		

International career
2008–	Russia	37	(18)
- * Club domestic league appearances and goals as of 27 May 2025

Dmitri Sergeyevich Prudnikov (born 6 January 1988) is a Russian futsal player who is currently playing for MFK Ukhta and the Russian national futsal team.

== Biography ==
Prudnikov was born in Krasnoturinsk. Up to 14 years he played futsal and bandy at a local school, but then he was noticed by the main regional futsal club MFK VIZ-Sinara Yekaterinburg, and Dmitriy moved to Yekaterinburg.

Since 2004 Dmitry has been involved in the first team, but the first full season of his career was the 2005/06 season. Then he scored 14 goals and contributed to the first silver medal of his team. In the following season Prudnikov scored 18 goals. In the final game of the Futsal Russian Cup Dmitry helped Yekaterinburg to become the owner of an honorary trophy.

Prudnikov’s long-awaited debut in the Russian national team took place on 27 January 2008 in the game against Croatia. The next day, Dmitry scored his first goal for the national team in Ukrainian gate, bringing his victory to his team.

In April 2008, "VIZ-Sinara" had to participate in the final games of the UEFA Futsal Cup. Dmitry helped the team to win the tournament and to get the title of the strongest team of Europe.

At the beginning of the 2008 World Cup he became one of the major discoveries of the tournament. With seven goals scored the young player entered the top ten scorers in the championship.

2008 ended with the first-ever Youth Championship of Europe. Dmitry was the captain of the Russian national team. He scored the only goal of the semifinal against Ukraine, the decisive goal of the final match against Italy and raised the league cup over his head. Soon he was recognized the best young player in the world by «UMBRO Futsal Awards».

== Achievements ==
- UEFA Futsal Championship silver medalist (1): 2012
- UEFA Futsal Cup Winner (1): 2007/08
- Russian Futsal Championship Winner (4): 2008/09, 2009/10, 2013/14, 2020/21
- Russian Futsal Cup Winner (4): 2006/07, 2016/17, 2021/22, 2022/23
- Russian Futsal League Cup Winner (1): 2024
- FIFA Futsal World Cup semifinalist (1): 2008
- UEFA European Youth Championship Winner (1): 2008

== Personal ==
- The best player of the Russian championship: 2011
- The best forward of the Russian championship (3): 2009, 2010, 2012
