= Konstantin Mayevsky =

Russian futsal player

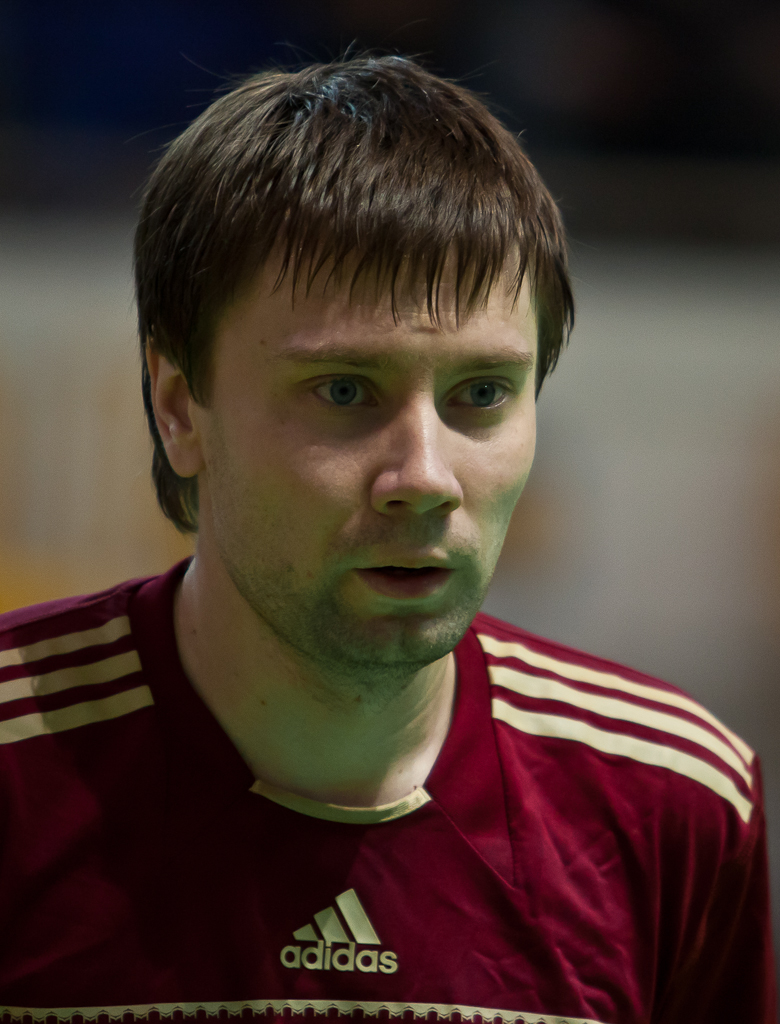

Personal information
- Date of birth: 5 October 1979 (age 47)
- Place of birth: Moscow, Soviet Union
- Height: 1.74 m (5 ft 9 in)
- Position: Ala

Senior career*
Years	Team	Apps	(Gls)
1997–1999	Chertanovo		
1999–2000	Dinamo		
2000–2002	CSKA Moscow		
2003–2010	Dinamo Moskva		
2010–2012	CSKA Moscow		

International career
2002–2012	Russia	73	(30)

Managerial career
- 2013–2015: Norilsk Nickel
- 2019–2022: Russia U19
- 2022–: Torpedo Nizhny Novgorod
- 2022–: Russia
- * Club domestic league appearances and goals

Konstantin Mayevsky (born 5 October 1979), is a former Russian futsal player who played for the Russian national futsal team. Since 2022 he acts as head coach for Russian national futsal team.
