= Betão (futsal player) =

Brazilian futsal player

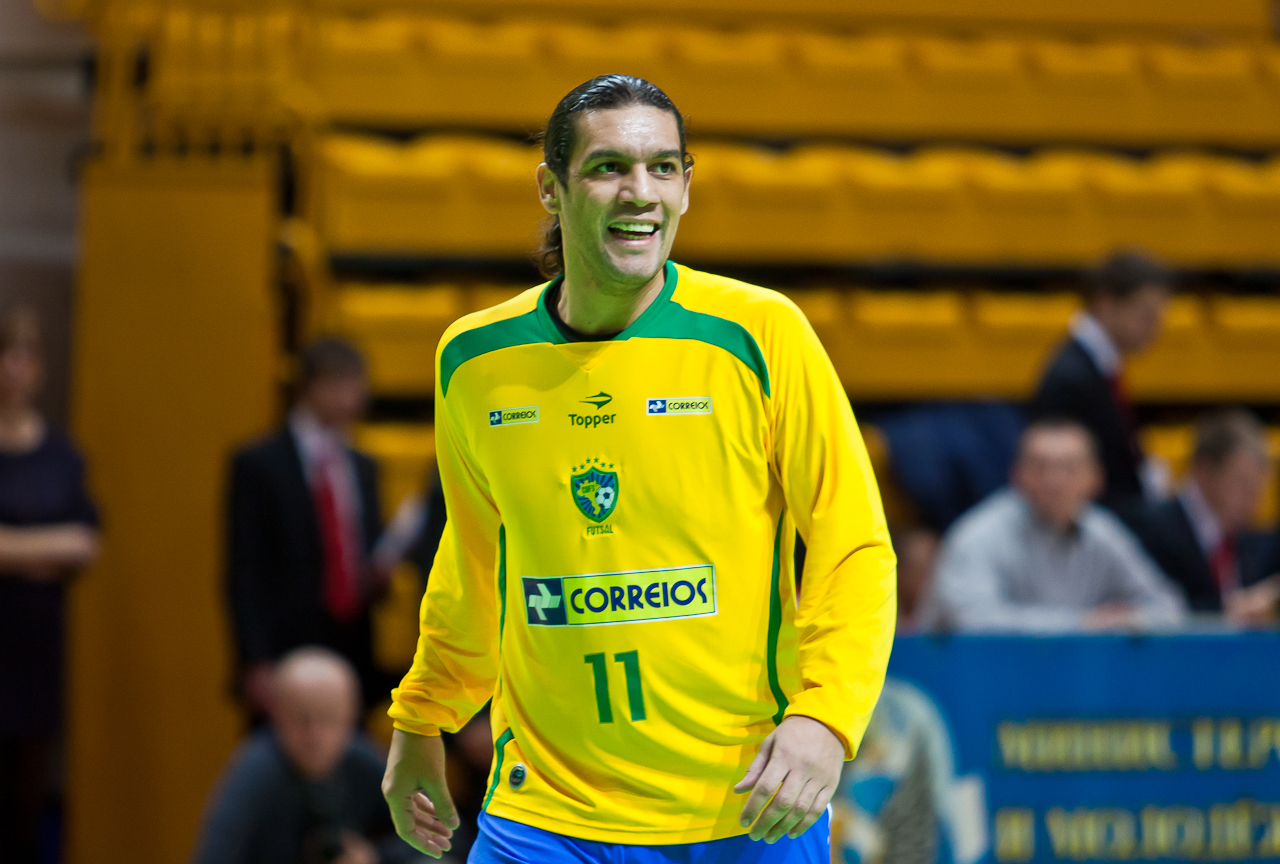

Personal information
- Full name: Adalberto Nunes da Silva
- Date of birth: 2 September 1978 (age 48)
- Place of birth: São Paulo, Brazil
- Position: Pivot

Team information
- Current team: Anorthosis Famagusta

Senior career*
Years	Team	Apps	(Gls)
1997–1998	General Motors		
1999–2001	Banespa		
2002–2003	UCS		
2003–2004	Carlos Barbosa		
2004–2008	Lobelle de Santiago	133	(129)
2008–2013	Interviú	138	(89)
2013–	Corinthians		

International career
- Brazil
- * Club domestic league appearances and goals

Adalberto Nunes da Silva (born 2 September 1978), commonly known as Betão, is a Brazilian futsal player. He currently plays for Sestu and the Brazilian Futsal national team in the pivot position.

== Honours ==
- 1 FIFA Futsal World Championship (2008)
- 2 Copas de España (2006, 2009)
- 1 Supercopa de España (2009)
- 1 Intercontinental (2004)
- 1 Recopa de Europa (06/07)
- 2 Campeonato Estatal (1999, 2001)
- 1 Liga Futsal Brasil (2004)
- 1 Copa Brasil (1998)
- 1 Campeonato Sudamericano (2006)
- 1 Pan American Games Champion (2007)
- 1 Copa América (2007)
- 2 Grand Prix (2005, 2008)
- 1 Copa Xunta de Galicia (2005)
- 1 Top scorer División de Honor (07/08)
- 1 Copa Libertadores de Ámerica de futsal (2015)
