= Serhiy Chepornyuk =

Ukrainian futsal player

Chepornyuk
Personal information
- Full name: Serhiy Chepornyuk
- Date of birth: 18 April 1982 (age 44)
- Place of birth: Soviet Union
- Position: Winger

Team information
- Current team: Energy Lviv

Senior career*
Years	Team	Apps	(Gls)
- Energy Lviv

International career
- Ukraine
- * Club domestic league appearances and goals

Serhiy Chepornyuk (born 18 April 1982), is a Ukrainian futsal player who plays for Energy Lviv and the Ukraine national futsal team.
