= Pula (futsal) =

Brazilian-born Russian futsal player

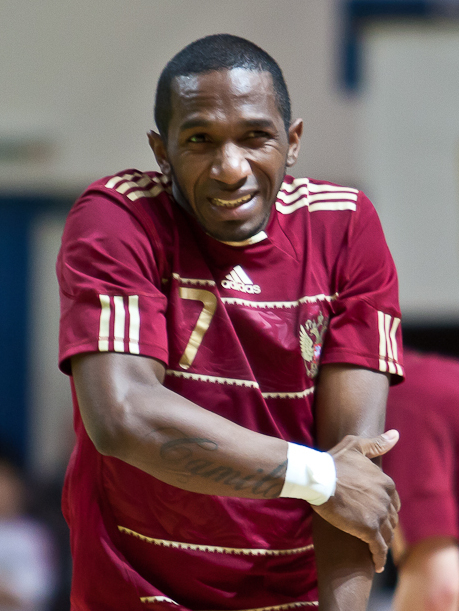
- Pula celebrating a goal for Russia in 2011

Personal information
- Full name: Vágner Kaetano Pereira
- Date of birth: 2 December 1980 (age 45)
- Place of birth: São Paulo, Brazil
- Height: 1.80 m (5 ft 11 in)
- Position: Pivot

Team information
- Current team: Sorocaba
- Number: 7

Senior career*
Years	Team	Apps	(Gls)
2000–2004	Carlos Barbosa		
2004–2006	Arbat		
2006–2016	Dinamo Moskva	276	(95)
2016–2017	KPRF	18	(8)
2017–2018	Avtodor Smolensk	24	(11)
2018–	Sorocaba		

International career
2008–2014	Russia	52	(47)
- * Club domestic league appearances and goals

Vágner Kaetano Pereira, also known as Pula (Russian Cyrillic: Пула; born 2 December 1980), is a Brazilian-born Russian futsal player who plays for Magnus Sorocaba Futsal as a pivot.

== Career ==
He played for Russia at the 2008 FIFA Futsal World Cup in his homeland, Brazil, and ended the tournament as top scorer with 18 goals, the first on 2 October in a 10–5 win over Cuba. Nine of them came in a 31–2 group win over the Solomon Islands, the most by a player in the World Cup and biggest win by a team. He then scored the sixth in a 9–1 win over Japan. In the second match of the second group phase, he scored a hat-trick as Russia beat Paraguay 5–4. Pula scored a goal against Brazil but lost 4–2.
