= Ari Santos =

Brazilian futsal player (born 1982)

Ari
Personal information
- Full name: Ari Santos
- Date of birth: 6 March 1982 (age 44)
- Place of birth: São Paulo, Brazil
- Height: 1.73 m (5 ft 8 in)
- Position: Defender

Team information
- Current team: Catgas Energia

Senior career*
Years	Team	Apps	(Gls)
1999–2000	GM		
2001–2005	Ulbra		
2006	Joinville		
2006–2007	Celta de Vigo	27	(13)
2007–2009	Malwee		
2009–2016	Barcelona	103	(31)
2016–2017	Dinamo Moskva		
2019	London Helvecia		

International career
- Brazil
- * Club domestic league appearances and goals

Ari Santos (born 6 March 1982) is a Brazilian futsal player who plays for Dinamo Moskva as a defender.

== Honours ==
- 2 World Cup (2008, 2012)
- 4 Liga Futsal (2002, 2003, 2007, 2008)
- 1 Intercontinental (2001)
- 1 Copa Paulista (2000)
- 2 Copas Gaucho (2001, 2003)
- 2 Grand Prix (2005, 2009)
- 1 Torneo Ibérico (2003)
