= Saad Assis =

Brazilian futsal player

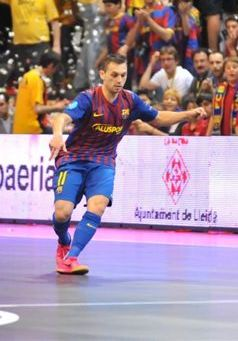
- Saad Assis in 2014

Personal information
- Full name: Saad Assis
- Date of birth: 26 July 1979 (age 47)
- Place of birth: São Paulo, Brazil
- Position: Ala

Team information
- Current team: Barcelona

Senior career*
Years	Team	Apps	(Gls)
2000	Ulbra		
2001–2002	Móstoles	12	(14)
2003	Banespa		
2004	Ulbra		
2005–2006	Luparense		
2006–2008	Móstoles	59	(32)
2008–2016	Barcelona	158	(49)

International career
2007–2014	Italy	82	(44)
- * Club domestic league appearances and goals

Saad Assis (born 26 October 1979), is a Brazilian futsal player who plays for FC Barcelona Futsal as an Ala.

Saad Assis has been a member of the Italian national futsal team.

During the 2008 FIFA Futsal World Cup Final, Assis played in nine matches.

== Honours ==
- 1 Liga Futsal (1999)
- 1 Coppa Italia (2006)
- 4 Campeonato Mineiro (1997, 1998, 1999, 2000)
