= Vladislav Shayakhmetov =

Russian football and futsal player

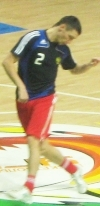
- Vladislav Shayakhmetov before the national team game

Personal information
- Full name: Vladislav Nailyevich Shayakhmetov
- Date of birth: 25 August 1981 (age 45)
- Place of birth: Revda, Sverdlovsk Oblast, Russia
- Height: 1.74 m (5 ft 9 in)
- Position: Forward

Senior career*
Years	Team	Apps	(Gls)
1999–2000	FC Uralmash	2	(0)
2000–2001	FC Uralets	36	(10)
2001–2008	MFK Viz-Sinara	267	(237)
2008–2013	MFK Dinamo	69	(49)
2013–2014	MFK Sinara	7	(4)
2014–2019	MFK Gazprom-Ugra		
2019–2022	MFK Norilsk Nickel	117	(23)

International career
2003–2021	Russia (futsal)	85	(37)
- * Club domestic league appearances and goals

Vladislav Nailyevich Shayakhmetov (born 25 August 1981) is a Russian football and futsal player. He is a former member of the Russian national futsal team.

== Honours ==
Individual

- World's Best Futsal Player 2007

With MFK Viz-Sinara

- Winner of the UEFA Cup Futsal Cup 2007-08
- Winner of the Cup of Russia on mini-football 2007

With MFK Dinamo Yamal

- Winner of the Cup of Russia on mini-football 2009

With Russia national futsal team

- Silver winner of the UEFA European Futsal Cup 2005
- Bronze winner of the UEFA European Futsal Cup 2007
- Semifinalist World Cup Futsal Cup 2008
