= Matías Lucuix =

Argentine futsal player and manager

Personal information
- Full name: Matías Raúl Lucuix
- Date of birth: 20 November 1985 (age 40)
- Place of birth: Buenos Aires, Argentina
- Height: 1.86 m (6 ft 1 in)
- Position: Winger

Team information
- Current team: Argentina (head coach)

Senior career*
| Years | Team | Apps | (Gls) |
| 1996–2007 | River Plate | | |
| 2007–2011 | Segovia | | |
| 2011–2012 | Inter Movistar | | |

International career
- Argentina

Managerial career
- Argentina
Medal record
Representing Argentina
Men's Futsal
FIFA Futsal World Cup
| Silver medal – second place | 2024 Uzbekistan |
- * Club domestic league appearances and goals

Matías Raúl Lucuix (born 20 November 1985) is an Argentine futsal manager and retired player, who played for the Argentina national team, which he is its current head coach.
