= Lenísio =

Brazilian futsal player

Personal information
- Full name: Lenísio Teixeira Júnior
- Date of birth: 23 October 1976 (age 50)
- Place of birth: Cuiabá, Brazil
- Height: 1.77 m (5 ft 10 in)
- Position: Pivot

Senior career*
Years	Team	Apps	(Gls)
1994–1996	A.D.C. Wimpro		
1997	G.M.		
1998–2000	Atlético Mineiro		
2001–2002	Sport Club Ulbra		
2002–2005	ElPozo Murcia		
2005–2007	Polaris World Cartagena		
2007–2010	Malwee		
2011–2012	Poker/PEC		

International career
1999–2008	Brazil		
- * Club domestic league appearances and goals

Lenísio Teixeira Júnior (born 23 October 1976), commonly known as Lenísio, is a former Brazilian futsal player.

== Honours ==
- 1 FIFA World Cup (2008)
- 1 runner FIFA World Cup (2000)
- 2 Brazilian champion (1999 and 2002)
- 1 Spanish cup (2003)
- 3 Brazilian league best player (2000, 2001 and 2002)
- 3 LNFS best player (2002/03, 2003/04 and 2004/05)
- 4 Brazilian league top scorer (1997, 2000, 2001 and 2002)
- 2 LNFS top scorer (2003/04 and 2004/05)
- 3 LNFS best pivot (2002/03, 2003/04 and 2004/05)
