= Marquinho (futsal player, born 1974) =

Brazilian futsal player

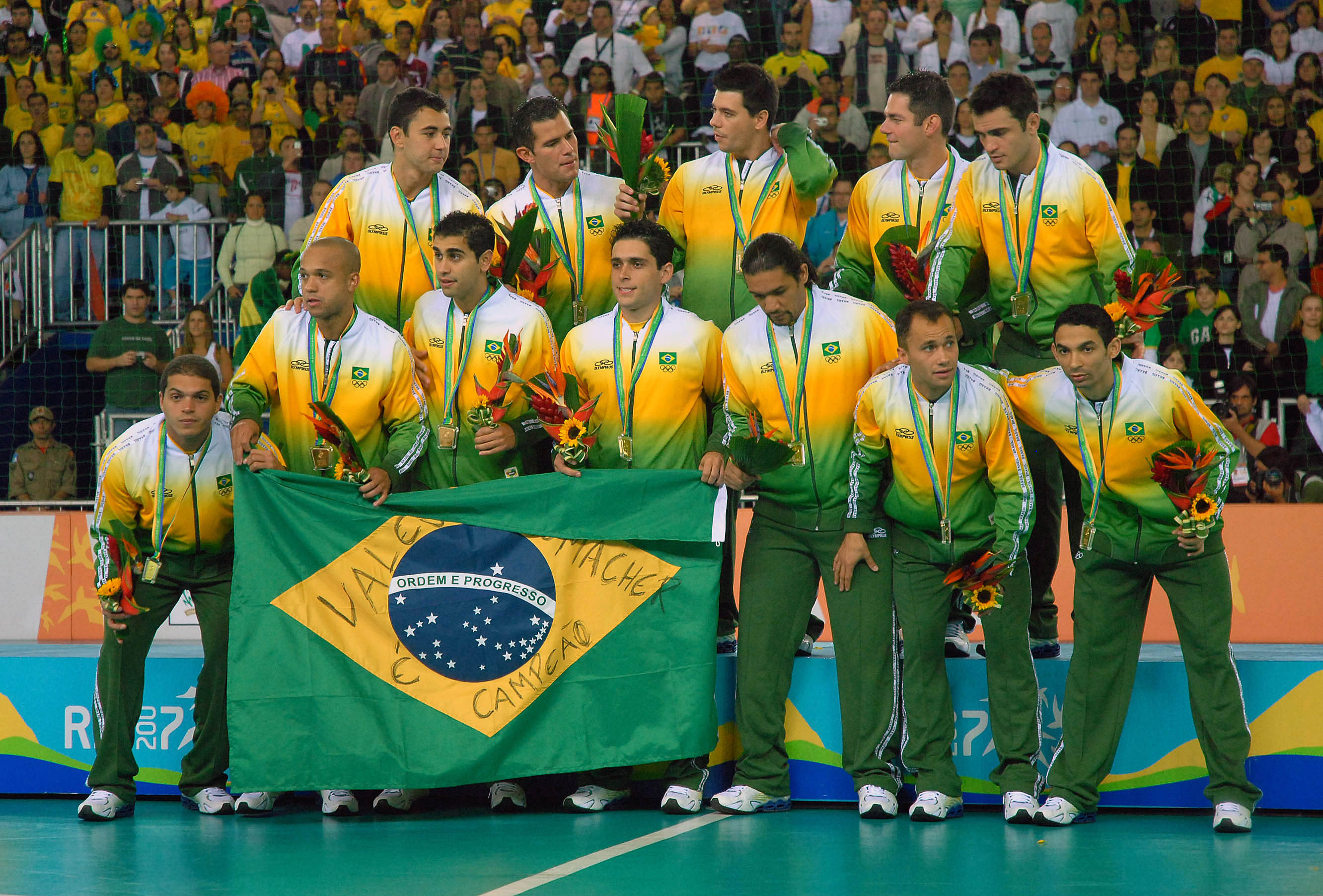
- Aurélio dos Santos after winning the gold medal at the futsal competition at the 2007 Pan American Games

Personal information
- Full name: Marco Aurélio dos Santos
- Date of birth: 7 October 1974 (age 52)
- Place of birth: São Paulo, Brazil
- Height: 1.69 m (5 ft 7 in)
- Position: Pivot

Senior career*
Years	Team	Apps	(Gls)
1996–1998	Carlos Barbosa		
1999	Ulbra		
2000	Vasco		
2001	Carlos Barbosa		
2001–2011	Inter Movistar		
2011–2012	Nagoya Oceans		
2013	Arsenal Esporte Clube		

International career
	Brazil	69	
- * Club domestic league appearances and goals

Marco Aurélio dos Santos (born 7 October 1974), commonly known as Marquinho, is a former Brazilian futsal player who plays as a Pivot during his career.

== Honours ==
- 1 World Championship (2008)
- 5 División de Honor (2001/02, 2002/03, 2003/04, 2004/05, 2007/08)
- 5 Supercopas de España (2002/03, 2003/04, 2005/06, 2007/08, 2008/09)
- 4 Copas de España (2003/04, 2004/05, 2006/07, 2008/09)
- 3 UEFA Futsal Cup (2004, 2006, 2009)
- 5 Intercontinental Cup (1999, 2005, 2006, 2007, 2008)
- 1 Recopa de Europa (2008)
- 2 Copas Ibéricas (2003/04, 2005/06)
- 4 Campeonatos de Liga Estatal (1996, 1997, 1998, 2000)
- 2 Campeonatos de Liga Nacional (2000, 2001)
- 1 Copa Brasil (2000)
- 1 Grand Prix (2009)
- 1 Copa Río São Paulo (2000)
- 2 Campeonatos Sudamericanos (1999, 2008)
- 2 Pan American Games (2007, 2008)
- 1 FIFA Tournament (Singapur 1999)
- 1 Portugal Tournament (2001)
- 1 best Pívot LNFS (2007/08)
- 2 best player Supercopa España (2003, 2004)
- 1 best player Intercontinental Cup (2005)
