= Schumacher (futsal player) =

Brazilian futsal player

Personal information
- Full name: Flávio Sérgio Viana
- Date of birth: 31 August 1975 (age 51)
- Place of birth: São Paulo, Brazil
- Position: Defender

Senior career*
Years	Team	Apps	(Gls)
1997	Corinthians		
1998–1999	General Motors		
2000	Vasco		
2001–2012	Inter Movistar		
2012–2015	Corinthians		

International career
	Brazil	98	
- * Club domestic league appearances and goals

Flávio Sérgio Viana known as Schumacher (born in São Paulo, 31 August 1975) is a Brazilian futsal player. He was elected as the 2008 World's Best Futsal Player. His nickname is a reference to German football goalkeeper Harald Schumacher.
