= Fernandão (futsal player) =

Spanish futsal player

Fernandão (VBS)
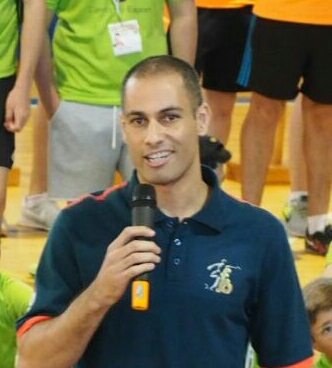

Personal information
- Full name: Fernando Maciel Gonçalves (VBS)
- Date of birth: 16 August 1980 (age 46)
- Place of birth: São Paulo, Brazil
- Height: 1.84 m (6 ft 0 in)
- Position: Pivot

Team information
- Current team: MFK Dinamo Moskva
- Number: 6

Senior career*
Years	Team	Apps	(Gls)
2000	General Motors		
2001	Ulbra		
2001	Malwee		
2001	Vasco da Gama		
2002	Banespa		
2002	Toledo		
2003	São Miguel		
2004	Joinville		
2004–2006	Martorell	158	(156)
2006–2007	Playas de Castellón	36	(48)
2007–2014	FC Barcelona	256	(163)
2014–	MFK Dinamo Moskva		

International career
	Spain	102	(70)
- * Club domestic league appearances and goals

Fernando Maciel Gonçalves (born 16 August 1980), commonly known as Fernandão, is a futsal player who plays for Dinamo as a Pivot. Born in Brazil, he plays for the Spain national futsal team.

== Honours ==
- 2 Winner UEFA Futsal Cup (2012, 2014)
- 1 Runner World Cup (2008)
- 1 Campeonato Carioca (2001)
- 1 Campeonato Paulista
- 3 Campeonatos LNFS (España) (2011, 2012, 2013)
- 3 Copas de España (2011, 2012, 2013)
- 4 Copas del Rey (2011, 2012, 2013, 2014)
- 1 Supercopa de España (2013)
- 6 Catalonia Cup (2004, 2005, 2008, 2009, 2010, 2013)
- 1 Top scorer LNFS 05/06
- 1 Best Pívot of the LNFS (05/06)
