= Ciço =

Brazilian futsal player

Personal information
- Full name: Jefferson Rodrigues de Brito
- Date of birth: 16 October 1981 (age 45)
- Place of birth: Florianópolis, Brazil
- Position: Defender

Senior career*
Years	Team	Apps	(Gls)
1998–1999	Malwee Futsal		
1999–2000	GM/Chevrolet		
2000–2001	Ulbra		
2001–2002	Banespa		
2002–2003	Ulbra		
2003–2004	Benfica		
2004–2005	Barcel Euro Puebla		
2005–2006	Lobelle de Santiago		
2006–2007	PW Cartagena		
2007–2010	ElPozo Murcia		
2010–2011	Inter Movistar		
2011	Foolad Mahan		
2012–	Intelli/Orlândia		

International career
	Brazil	70	(?)
- * Club domestic league appearances and goals

Jefferson Rodrigues de Brito (born 16 October 1981), commonly known as Ciço, is a Brazilian futsal player who plays for Intelli/Orlândia as a Defender.

== Honours ==
- 1 World Cup (2008)
- 1 División de Honor (08/09)
- 1 Liga Futsal (02/03)
- 2 Copas de España (2006, 2008)
- 1 Supercopa de España (2010)
- 1 Grand Prix (2009)
- 1 Supercopa de Portugal (2003)
- 1 Intercontinental (2000)
- 1 Nations Cup (01)
- 2 Latin Cup (02 y 03)
- 1 Juego Sudamericano (02)
- 2 C. Estatales (00/01, 01/02)
- 1 C. Metropolitano (01/02)
- 1 C. São Paulo (01/02)
- 1 C. Topper (01/02)
- 1 Catarinense (98/99)
- 2 Juegos Abiertos (99, 00)
- 1 Copa Xunta de Galicia (2005)
