= Álvaro Aparicio =

Spanish futsal player

Álvaro
Personal information
- Full name: Álvaro Aparicio Fernández
- Date of birth: 29 September 1977 (age 49)
- Place of birth: Madrid, Spain
- Position: Ala

Team information
- Current team: Inter Movistar

Senior career*
Years	Team	Apps	(Gls)
1997–1998	Interviú		
1998–1999	Jerez		
1999–2000	Interviú		
2000–2003	Caja Segovia	62	(61)
2003–2011	ElPozo Murcia	317	(105)
2011–	Inter Movistar	18	(4)

International career
	Spain	100	
- * Club domestic league appearances and goals

Álvaro Aparicio Fernández (born 29 September 1977), commonly known as Álvaro, is a Spanish futsal player who plays for Inter Movistar as an Ala.

== Honours ==
- 1 runner FIFA Futsal World Cup (2008)
- 4 Leagues (05/06, 06/07, 08/09, 09/10)
- 2 Copa de España (2008, 2010)
- 4 Supercopas de España (2000, 2006, 2010, 2011)
- 2 UEFA Futsal Championship (2007, 2010)
- 1 Cup Winners Cup (2003)
- 1 Copa Ibérica (2007)
- 1 FIFA Singapur Tournament(2001)
- 1 Intercontinental (2000)
