= Greenland national futsal team results =

The following are the Greenland national futsal team results in official international futsal matches since the team's formation in 2013. Although Greenland regularly plays training matches against club teams, only results against other national teams are included.

Contents
- 2013
- 2015
- 2016
- 2017
- 2018
- 2019
- 2021
- 2022
- 2023
- 2024
- 2025

- Key
- Head-to-head record
- References
- External links

== Results ==
=== Key ===
The coloured backgrounds denote the result of the match:

– indicates Greenland won the match
– indicates Greenland's opposition won the match
– indicates the match ended in a draw

=== 2013 ===
30 November 2013 Friendly	Greenland	6–2	Faroe Islands	Nuuk, Greenland
	Frederik Funch, Markus Jensen, Kaassannguaq Zeeb; John Ludvig Broberg	Report		Stadium: Inussivik

1 December 2013 Friendly	Greenland	5–3	Faroe Islands	Nuuk, Greenland
	John Ludvig Broberg, Norsaq Lund Mathæussen; Jakob Møller; Markus Jensen	Report		Stadium: Inussivik

=== 2015 ===
7 November 2015 Friendly	Greenland	2–2	Denmark	Nuuk, Greenland
	Johan Bidstrup; Markus Jensen	Report		Stadium: Inussivik

8 November 2015 Friendly	Greenland	5–4	Denmark	Nuuk, Greenland
	Katu Madsen,	Report		Stadium: Inussivik

=== 2016 ===
25 January 2016 Friendly	Czech Republic	6–0	Greenland	Chrudim, Czech Republic
		Report		Stadium: Sportovní Hala Chrudim

26 January 2016 Friendly	Czech Republic	16–3	Greenland	Chrudim, Czech Republic
		Report		Stadium: Sportovní Hala Chrudim

1 December 2016 2016 Nordic Futsal Cup	Finland	6–4	Greenland	Skövde, Sweden
	Miika Hosio; Iiro Vanha, Arber Istrefi; Markus Rautiainen; Jaakko Alasuutari	Report	Ari Hermann; Markus Jensen; Frederik Funch; Johan Broberg	Stadium: Arena Skövde

2 December 2016 2016 Nordic Futsal Cup	Norway	3–4	Greenland	Skövde, Sweden
	Niklas Espegren; Tobias Schjetne; Milos Vucenovic	Report	Markus Jensen; Nikki Petersen; Niklas Thorleifsen; ??? (o.g.)	Stadium: Arena Skövde

3 December 2016 2016 Nordic Futsal Cup	Denmark	7–2	Greenland	Skövde, Sweden
	Lukas Christoffersen; Zakaria El-Ouaz; Ibrahim Badran, Kevin Jørgensen; Magnus Rasmussen; Jannik Mehlsen	Report	Nick Reimer; Katu Madsen	Stadium: Arena Skövde

4 December 2016 2016 Nordic Futsal Cup	Sweden	5–0	Greenland	Skövde, Sweden
	Nicklas Asp; Fredrik Söderqvist, Aday Kaplan; Sargon Abraham	Report		Stadium: Arena Skövde

=== 2017 ===
15 March 2017 Friendly	Denmark	7–6	Greenland	Gentofte, Denmark
		Report		Stadium: Gentofte Sportspark

16 March 2017 Friendly	Denmark	7–4	Greenland	Gentofte, Denmark
		Report		Stadium: Gentofte Sportspark

18 March 2017 2017 Vsetín Generali Cup	Czech Republic U21	7–5	Greenland	Vsetín, Czech Republic
		Report	Malik Juhl; Nukannguaq Zeeb; Lars Peter Broberg; John Ludvig Broberg; Frederik Funch	Stadium: Zimní stadion Na Lapači

19 March 2017 2017 Vsetín Generali Cup	Czech Republic U21	4–8	Greenland	Vsetín, Czech Republic
		Report	Frederik Funch,, Nukansuaq; Lars-Erik Reimer; Malik Juhl,,	Stadium: Zimní stadion Na Lapači

6 December 2017 2017 Nordic Futsal Cup	Finland	4–1	Greenland	Stjørdal, Norway
		Report		Stadium: Arena Stjørdal

7 December 2017 2017 Nordic Futsal Cup	Sweden	5–3	Greenland	Stjørdal, Norway
		Report		Stadium: Arena Stjørdal

8 December 2017 2017 Nordic Futsal Cup	Denmark	2–2	Greenland	Stjørdal, Norway
		Report		Stadium: Arena Stjørdal

9 December 2017 2017 Nordic Futsal Cup	Norway	3–3	Greenland	Stjørdal, Norway
		Report		Stadium: Arena Stjørdal

=== 2018 ===
13 May 2018 2018 4 CUP Hodonín	Czech Republic U21	4–1	Greenland	Hodonín, Czech Republic
		Report	Nukannguaq Zeeb	Stadium: Sportovní Hala TEZA Hodonín

14 May 2018 2018 4 CUP Hodonín	Czech Republic U21	6–5	Greenland	Hodonín, Czech Republic
		Report	Markus Jensen,,,	Stadium: Sportovní Hala TEZA Hodonín

16 May 2018 Friendly	Denmark	10–4	Greenland	Gentofte, Denmark
		Report	Niklas Thorleifsen; Nick Reimer; Hans-Karl Berthelsen; Søren Kreutzmann	Stadium: Gentofte Sportspark

17 May 2018 Friendly	Denmark	4–4	Greenland	Gentofte, Denmark
		Report	Hans-Karl Berthelsen; John Ludvig Broberg; Ari Hermann; ??? (o.g.)	Stadium: Gentofte Sportspark

4 December 2018 2018 Nordic Futsal Cup	Finland	6–1	Greenland	Ringkøbing, Denmark
		Report	John Ludvig Broberg	Stadium: Ringkøbing-Skjern Kulturcenter

5 December 2018 2018 Nordic Futsal Cup	Norway	5–2	Greenland	Ringkøbing, Denmark
		Report		Stadium: Ringkøbing-Skjern Kulturcenter

6 December 2018 2018 Nordic Futsal Cup	Sweden	6–5	Greenland	Ringkøbing, Denmark
		Report		Stadium: Ringkøbing-Skjern Kulturcenter

6 December 2018 2018 Nordic Futsal Cup	Denmark	7–1	Greenland	Ringkøbing, Denmark
		Report		Stadium: Ringkøbing-Skjern Kulturcenter

=== 2019 ===
21 September 2019 2019 Futsal Week Autumn Cup	Saudi Arabia	6–5	Greenland	Poreč, Croatia
		Report		Stadium: Finida Hall

22 September 2019 2019 Futsal Week Autumn Cup	Belgium	6–4	Greenland	Poreč, Croatia
		Report		Stadium: Finida, Hall]]

25 September 2019 2019 Futsal Week Autumn Cup	Norway	5–0	Greenland	Poreč, Croatia
		Report		Stadium: Finida Hall

29 November 2019 2019 Nordic Futsal Cup	Finland	11–1	Greenland	Turku, Finland
		Report	Patrick Otiri Frederiksen	Stadium: Kupittaan Palloiluhalli

30 November 2019 2019 Nordic Futsal Cup	Sweden	7–1	Greenland	Turku, Finland
		Report	Rene Eriksen Petersen	Stadium: Kupittaan Palloiluhalli

1 December 2019 2019 Nordic Futsal Cup	Norway	3–0	Greenland	Turku, Finland
		Report		Stadium: Kupittaan Palloiluhalli

3 December 2019 2019 Nordic Futsal Cup	Denmark	3–4	Greenland	Turku, Finland
		Report	Frederik Funch	Stadium: Kupittaan Palloiluhalli

=== 2021 ===
3 October 2021 2021 Futsal Week October Cup	Finland	7–1	Greenland	Poreč, Croatia
		Report	Markus Jensen	Stadium: Finida Hall

5 October 2021 2021 Futsal Week October Cup	Poland	2–0	Greenland	Poreč, Croatia
		Report		Stadium: Finida Hall

15 December 2021 2021 Nordic Futsal Cup	Sweden	7–1	Greenland	Karlskrona, Sweden
		Report		Stadium: Brinova Arena

16 December 2021 2021 Nordic Futsal Cup	Norway	2–2	Greenland	Karlskrona, Sweden
		Report		Stadium: Brinova Arena

18 December 2021 2021 Nordic Futsal Cup	Denmark	7–4	Greenland	Karlskrona, Sweden
		Report		Stadium: Brinova Arena

=== 2022 ===
7 November 2022 2022 Futsal Week November Cup	Hungary	3–0	Greenland	Poreč, Croatia
		Report		Stadium: Finida Hall

8 November 2022 2022 Futsal Week November Cup	Latvia	1–1	Greenland	Poreč, Croatia
		Report		Stadium: Finida Hall

=== 2023 ===
12 January 2023 2023 Futsal Week January Cup	Bosnia and Herzegovina	5–3	Greenland	Poreč, Croatia
		Report	Niklas Thustrup Johansen	Stadium: Finida Hall

13 January 2023 2023 Futsal Week January Cup	Estonia	1–2	Greenland	Poreč, Croatia
		Report	Frederik Funch; Rene Eriksen Petersen	Stadium: Finida Hall

14 January 2023 2023 Futsal Week January Cup	Romania	2–0	Greenland	Poreč, Croatia
		Report		Stadium: Finida Hall

15 January 2023 2023 Futsal Week January Cup	Hungary	6–0	Greenland	Poreč, Croatia
		Report		Stadium: Finida Hall

12 December 2023 2023 Baltic-Nordic Futsal Cup	Denmark	8–1	Greenland	Hjørring, Denmark
		Report		Stadium: Park Vendia Hall

13 December 2023 2023 Baltic-Nordic Futsal Cup	Norway	2–2	Greenland	Hjørring, Denmark
		Report		Stadium: Park Vendia Hall

16 December 2023 2023 Baltic-Nordic Futsal Cup	Estonia	2–4	Greenland	Hjørring, Denmark
		Report		Stadium: Park Vendia Hall

17 December 2023 2023 Baltic-Nordic Futsal Cup	Estonia	4–2	Greenland	Hjørring, Denmark
		Report		Stadium: Park Vendia Hall

=== 2024 ===
1 February 2024 2024 Futsal Week February Cup	Switzerland	2–8	Greenland	Labin, Croatia
		Report	Hans Ole Kleist,, Rass Abelsen, Hans Karl Berthelsen; Niklas Thorleifsen; Rene Eriksen Petersen	Stadium: Sportski Centar Franko Mileta

3 February 2024 2024 Futsal Week February Cup	Malta	1–5	Greenland	Labin, Croatia
		Report	Rene Eriksen Petersen, Patrick Frederiksen; Søren Kreutzmann; Hand Karl Berthelsen	Stadium: Sportski Centar Franko Mileta

4 February 2024 2024 Futsal Week February Cup	San Marino	3–2	Greenland	Labin, Croatia
		Report	Aqqalooraq Lund	Stadium: Sportski Centar Franko Mileta

=== 2025 ===
5 March 2025 2025 Copa Intercontinental de Selecoes	Brazil	13–0	Greenland	Sao Jose dos Pinhais, Brazil
				Stadium: Ginasio De Esportes e Lazer Max Rosenmann

6 March 2025 2025 Copa Intercontinental de Selecoes	Afghanistan	5–4	Greenland	Sao Jose dos Pinhais, Brazil
				Stadium: Ginasio De Esportes e Lazer Max Rosenmann

7 March 2025 2025 Copa Intercontinental de Selecoes	Iran	11–2	Greenland	Sao Jose dos Pinhais, Brazil
		Report		Stadium: Ginasio De Esportes e Lazer Max Rosenmann

9 March 2025 2025 Copa Intercontinental de Selecoes	Afghanistan	6–4	Greenland	Sao Jose dos Pinhais, Brazil
				Stadium: Ginasio De Esportes e Lazer Max Rosenmann

== Head-to-head record ==
As of match played 9 October 2025

Positive Record Neutral Record Negative Record

Opponent	Pld	W	D	L	GF	GA	GD
Afghanistan	2	0	0	2	8	11	-3
Belgium	1	0	0	1	4	6	-2
Brazil	1	0	0	1	0	13	-13
Bosnia and Herzegovina	1	0	0	1	3	5	-2
Czech Republic	2	0	0	2	3	21	-18
Czech Republic U21	4	1	0	3	19	21	-2
Denmark	12	2	3	7	39	68	-19
Estonia	3	2	0	1	8	7	-1
Faroe Islands	2	2	0	0	11	5	6
Finland	5	0	0	5	8	34	-26
Hungary	2	0	0	2	0	9	-9
Iran	1	0	0	1	2	11	-9
Saudi Arabia	1	0	0	1	5	6	-1
Latvia	1	0	1	0	1	1	0
Malta	1	1	0	0	5	1	4
Norway	7	1	3	3	13	23	-10
Poland	1	0	0	1	0	2	-2
Romania	1	0	0	1	0	2	-2
San Marino	1	0	0	1	2	3	-1
Sweden	5	0	0	5	10	30	-20
Switzerland	1	1	0	0	8	2	6
Total	55	10	7	38	149	282	-133
