= Sweden men's national futsal team =

Sweden
- Nickname(s): Blågult (The Blue-Yellow)
- Association: Swedish Football Association
- Confederation: UEFA (Europe)
- Head coach: Matija Đulvat
- Asst coach: Lars Ternström
- Captain: Nicklas Asp
- FIFA code: SWE
- FIFA ranking: 64 ▲9 (8 May 2026)
- Highest FIFA ranking: 58 (December 2015)
- Lowest FIFA ranking: 77 (March 2018)
Home colours	Away colours

First international
- Sweden 2–3 France (Gothenburg, Sweden; 11 December 2012)

Biggest win
- Sweden 13–0 Scotland (Skövde, Sweden; 15 January 2015)

Biggest defeat
- Spain 13–0 Sweden (Águilas, Spain; 28 March 2013)

FIFA World Cup
- Appearances: 0

European Championship
- Appearances: 0

The Sweden national futsal team represents Sweden in international futsal competitions such as the FIFA Futsal World Cup and the European Championships and is controlled by the Swedish Football Association. The team played their first official match in December 2012 against France in Gothenburg. One month later, Sweden played their first competitive games and took three impressive victories in the qualification round for the 2014 European Championship.

== History ==
In 2005, an unofficial Sweden national team played a mini-tournament in Tehran against Iran and Japan. The games were sanctioned by FIFA, but the Swedish Football Association (SvFF) has not recognized these games as official. The unofficial national team has also played matches against Catalonia, which were sanctioned by the rival of FIFA, Asociación Mundial de Fútbol de Salón (AMF). In 2010, SvFF started a two-year-long process to boot a national team. Per Broberg was hired as coach, and on 11 December 2012, an official Sweden national team played their first game in front of their home crowd in the Lisebergshallen against France in Gothenburg which they lost 2–3.

== Tournament records ==
Sweden officially made their debut in an international competition at the UEFA Futsal Euro 2014 qualifying round in Andorra la Vella, Andorra on 23–26 January 2013.

=== FIFA Futsal World Cup ===
FIFA Futsal World Cup record									Qualification record					
Year	Round	Position	Pld	W	D	L	GF	GA	Pld	W	D	L	GF	GA
1989	Did not enter								Did not enter					
1992	Did not enter								Did not enter					
1996	Did not enter								Did not enter					
2000	Did not enter								Did not enter					
2004	Did not enter								Did not enter					
2008	Did not enter								Did not enter					
2012	Did not enter								Did not enter					
2016	Did not qualify								6	2	2	2	21	23
2021	Did not qualify								6	5	0	4	20	26
2024	Did not qualify								11	3	2	6	35	27
Total	0/10 app.								23	10	4	12	76	76

=== UEFA European Futsal Championship ===
UEFA European Futsal Championship record									Qualification record					
Year	Round	Position	Pld	W	D	L	GF	GA	Pld	W	D	L	GF	GA
1996	Did not enter								Did not enter					
1999	Did not enter								Did not enter					
2001	Did not enter								Did not enter					
2003	Did not enter								Did not enter					
2005	Did not enter								Did not enter					
2007	Did not enter								Did not enter					
2010	Did not enter								Did not enter					
2012	Did not enter								Did not enter					
2014	Did not qualify								6	3	0	3	12	28
2016	Did not qualify								3	2	0	1	20	4
2018	Did not qualify								2	1	0	1	9	12
(Netherlands) 2022	Did not qualify								3	1	0	2	9	14
(Latvia) (Lithuania) (Slovenia) 2026	Did not qualify								6	2	1	3	16	21
Total	0/13 app.								20	9	1	10	66	79

=== Nordic Futsal Cup ===
Nordic Futsal Cup record
Year	Round	Position	Pld	W	D	L	GF	GA
2013	Winners	1st	3	2	0	1	12	8
2014	Third place	3rd	3	0	2	1	6	10
2016	Runners-up	2nd	4	2	1	1	11	6
2017	Fourth place	4th	4	1	0	3	10	16
2018	Runners-up	2nd	4	3	0	1	20	16
Total	5/5 app.	1 title	18	8	3	7	59	56

== All-time team record ==
As of 10 June 2022.

Against	Played	Won	Drawn	Lost	GF	GA	GD
Albania	1	1	0	0	4	0	+4
Andorra	2	2	0	0	10	4	+6
Armenia	2	1	0	1	6	5	+1
Austria	3	0	2	1	8	10	−2
Azerbaijan	1	0	0	1	2	8	−6
Belarus	1	0	1	0	2	2	0
Belgium	1	0	0	1	5	8	–3
Bosnia and Herzegovina	1	0	0	1	3	6	–3
Croatia	3	0	0	3	2	15	−13
Czech Republic	2	0	0	2	7	12	−5
Denmark	10	3	3	4	32	33	−1
England	4	2	1	1	12	13	–1
Estonia	1	1	0	0	2	0	+2
Finland	8	2	0	6	17	31	–14
France	6	0	0	6	12	26	−14
Germany	3	2	0	1	12	10	+2
Gibraltar	1	1	0	0	5	1	+4
Greece	2	1	0	1	7	5	+2
Greenland	5	5	0	0	30	10	+20
Hungary	3	1	0	2	8	12	–4
Israel	2	2	0	0	8	2	+6
Latvia	2	2	0	0	12	9	+3
Malta	2	2	0	0	11	5	+6
Moldova	1	0	0	1	1	3	–2
Montenegro	3	0	1	2	12	21	–9
Netherlands	2	1	0	1	6	5	+1
North Macedonia	1	0	0	1	2	4	−2
Norway	10	5	2	3	32	22	+10
Poland	1	0	0	1	0	6	−6
Russia	1	0	0	1	3	7	−4
San Marino	1	1	0	0	9	4	+5
Scotland	1	1	0	0	13	0	+13
Spain	1	0	0	1	0	13	−13
Tajikistan	1	1	0	0	7	6	+1
Turkey	4	1	1	2	11	12	–1
Wales	2	0	1	1	4	5	–1
Total	95	38	12	45	320	335	−15

== Players ==
=== Current squad ===
The following players were called up to the squad for the 2028 FIFA Futsal World Cup qualifying matches against Northern Ireland, Switzerland and England on 7, 8 and 10 April 2026 respectively.

No.	Pos.	Player	Date of birth (age)	Caps	Goals	Club
12	GK	Camil Altun	28 November 2000 (age 25)	5	0	(Swedish Football Association) Borås AIK Futsal
20	GK	Viktor Sääf	13 June 1997 (age 29)	39	1	(Croatian Football Federation) HMNK Rijeka
2	DF	Ismail Fazlija	25 November 1997 (age 28)	8	1	(Swedish Football Association) Uddevalla Futsal Club
4	DF	Viktor Mossberg	16 July 2002 (age 24)	30	1	(Swedish Football Association) Uddevalla Futsal Club
5	DF	Oscar Edh	14 January 2003 (age 23)	3	0	(Swedish Football Association) Skoftebyns IF
6	DF	Albert Hiseni	20 December 1992 (age 33)	54	17	(Swedish Football Association) Uddevalla Futsal Club
7	DF	Fehim Smajlovic	31 October 1994 (age 31)	71	32	(Swedish Football Association) FC Ljiljan Göteborg
17	DF	Abdoulie Bojang	22 June 1999 (age 27)	23	0	(Swedish Football Association) Borås AIK Futsal
8	FW	Hampus Furublad	28 April 1995 (age 31)	28	4	(Swedish Football Association) Uddevalla Futsal Club
9	FW	Fredrik Söderqvist	13 March 1993 (age 33)	67	31	(Swedish Football Association) Uddevalla Futsal Club
10	FW	Petrit Zhubi (captain)	8 May 1988 (age 38)	72	33	(Swedish Football Association) Uddevalla Futsal Club
11	FW	Bryan Johansson	27 July 1995 (age 31)	12	4	(Swedish Football Association) Skoftebyns IF
15	FW	Gustav Rydberg	4 November 2001 (age 24)	11	1	(Swedish Football Association) FC Kalmar
16	FW	Donat Gashi	29 July 1998 (age 28)	35	14	(Swedish Football Association) Uddevalla Futsal Club

=== Recent call-ups ===
The following players have also been called up to the Portugal squad within the last 12 months.

Pos.	Player	Date of birth (age)	Caps	Goals	Club	Latest call-up
^{INJ} Player withdrew from the squad due to an injury.^{PRE} Preliminary squad.^{RET} Retired from international futsal.

== Statistics ==
=== Attendances ===
Top five attendances in home matches.

No.	Att.	Venue	Versus (result)	Date
1	2,373	Arena Skövde, Skövde	Denmark (3–4)	12 January 2013
2	1,711	Arena Skövde, Skövde	Israel (4–0)	17 January 2015
3	1,253	Lisebergshallen, Gothenburg	France (2–3)	11 December 2012
4	1,205	Umeå Energi Arena, Umeå	Czech Republic (4–6)	29 October 2016
5	1,140	Lisebergshallen, Gothenburg	France (3–5)	12 December 2012
