= 2025 Futsal Week September Cup =

Tournament details
- Host country: Croatia
- City: Poreč
- Dates: 18–21 September
- Teams: 4
- Venue: Intersport Hall

Final positions
- Champions: Montenegro (2nd title)
- Runners-up: San Marino
- Third place: Estonia
- Fourth place: Malta

The 2025 Futsal Week September Cup was an international men's futsal tournament hosted by Futsal Week, and held in Poreč, Croatia from 18 to 21 September 2025. Montenegro won the tournament.

== Teams ==
Team	Appearance	Previous best performance
Estonia	4th	Fourth place (Autumn 2024)
Malta	3rd	Fourth place (February 2024)
Montenegro	13th	Champions (Spring 2019)
San Marino	10th	Runner-up (February 2024)

== Standings ==
Pos	Team	Pld	W	D	L	GF	GA	GD	Pts
1	Montenegro (C)	3	3	0	0	15	4	+11	9
2	San Marino	3	0	2	1	0	6	−6	2
3	Estonia	3	0	2	1	7	8	−1	2
4	Malta	3	0	2	1	5	9	−4	2

Source: Futsal Planet
(C) Champions
18 September 2025
16:00

Estonia	3–4	Montenegro
Denis Vnukov 8' (pen.); Edwin Stüf 29'; Raul Rebane 38'	Report	Bališa Bojanic 12', 24'; Luka Vuletic 23', 38'

Intersport Hall, Poreč, Croatia
18 September 2025
18:15

San Marino	0–0	Malta
	Report

Intersport Hall, Poreč, Croatia

19 September 2025
16:00

Montenegro	5–1	Malta
	Report

Intersport Hall, Poreč, Croatia
19 September 2025
18:15

Estonia	0–0	San Marino
	Report

Intersport Hall, Poreč, Croatia

21 September 2025
16:00

San Marino	0–6	Montenegro
	Report

Intersport Hall, Poreč, Croatia
21 September 2025
18:15

Malta	4–4	Estonia
Luke Gatt 2', 38'; Maicon Da Silva Gaiewski 22'; Nathan Cope 35'	Report	Aidan Buhagiar 6' (o.g.); Stanislav Gussev 23'; Eduard Desjatski 25'; Raul Rebane 29'

Intersport Hall, Poreč, Croatia
