= Greenland national futsal team =

Greenland
- Shirt badge/Association crest
- Association: Football Association of Greenland
- Head coach: René Olsen
- Asst coach: Bo Holden
- Captain: Patrick Frederiksen
- Home stadium: Inussivik
- FIFA code: GRL

First international
- Greenland 6–2 Faroe Islands (Nuuk, Greenland; 30 November 2013)

Biggest win
- Switzerland 2–8 Greenland (Lapin, Croatia; 1 February 2024)

Biggest defeat
- Czech Republic 16–3 Greenland (Chrudim, Czech Republic; 26 January 2016)

Nordic Futsal Cup
- Appearances: 5 (First in 2016)
- Best result: 4th (2019)

The Greenland national futsal team is controlled by the Football Association of Greenland, the governing body for futsal in Greenland, and represents the country in international futsal competitions. It is not a member of FIFA or UEFA and can, therefore, not compete in official competitions of those governing bodies. The nation competes in open competitions such as the Nordic Futsal Cup and Futsal Week.

== History ==
The Football Association of Greenland assembled its-first ever national futsal team in November 2013 for two friendlies against the Faroe Islands in Nuuk. It was also the first time the Faroe Islands fielded an official futsal side. Frederik Funch scored his nation's first goal in the first match for the first-ever official goal in team history. Greenland went on to win both matches.

Greenland participated in the Nordic Futsal Cup for the first time in the 2016 edition of the tournament. The association saw this as a major step toward UEFA and FIFA membership. After years of unsuccessful attempts to joing the European confederation, the KAK submitted its application to become a member of CONCACAF, the confederation governing North America, Central America, and the Caribbean, in May 2024. When accepted, Greenland would be eligible to participate in the confederation's competitions, including the CONCACAF Futsal Championship.

== Fixtures and results ==
The following is a list of match results in the last 12 months, as well as any future matches that have been scheduled.

Win Draw Loss Fixture

=== 2023 ===
12 December 2023 2023 Baltic-Nordic Futsal Cup	Denmark	8–1	Greenland	Hjørring, Denmark
		Report		Stadium: Park Vendia Hall

13 December 2023 2023 Baltic-Nordic Futsal Cup	Norway	2–2	Greenland	Hjørring, Denmark
		Report		Stadium: Park Vendia Hall

16 December 2023 2023 Baltic-Nordic Futsal Cup	Estonia	2–4	Greenland	Hjørring, Denmark
		Report		Stadium: Park Vendia Hall

17 December 2023 2023 Baltic-Nordic Futsal Cup	Estonia	4–2	Greenland	Hjørring, Denmark
		Report		Stadium: Park Vendia Hall

=== 2024 ===
1 February 2024 2024 Futsal Week February Cup	Switzerland	2–8	Greenland	Labin, Croatia
		Report		Stadium: SC Franko Mileta

3 February 2024 2024 Futsal Week February Cup	Malta	1–5	Greenland	Labin, Croatia
		Report		Stadium: SC Franko Mileta

4 February 2024 2024 Futsal Week February Cup	San Marino	3–2	Greenland	Labin, Croatia
		Report		Stadium: SC Franko Mileta

=== 2025 ===
5 March 2025 2025 Copa Intercontinental de Selecoes	Brazil	13–0	Greenland	Sao Jose dos Pinhais, Brazil
				Stadium: Ginasio De Esportes e Lazer Max Rosenmann

6 March 2025 2025 Copa Intercontinental de Selecoes	Afghanistan	5–4	Greenland	Sao Jose dos Pinhais, Brazil
				Stadium: Ginasio De Esportes e Lazer Max Rosenmann

7 March 2025 2025 Copa Intercontinental de Selecoes	Iran	11–2	Greenland	Sao Jose dos Pinhais, Brazil
		Report		Stadium: Ginasio De Esportes e Lazer Max Rosenmann

9 March 2025 2025 Copa Intercontinental de Selecoes	Afghanistan	6–4	Greenland	Sao Jose dos Pinhais, Brazil
				Stadium: Ginasio De Esportes e Lazer Max Rosenmann

== Current squad ==
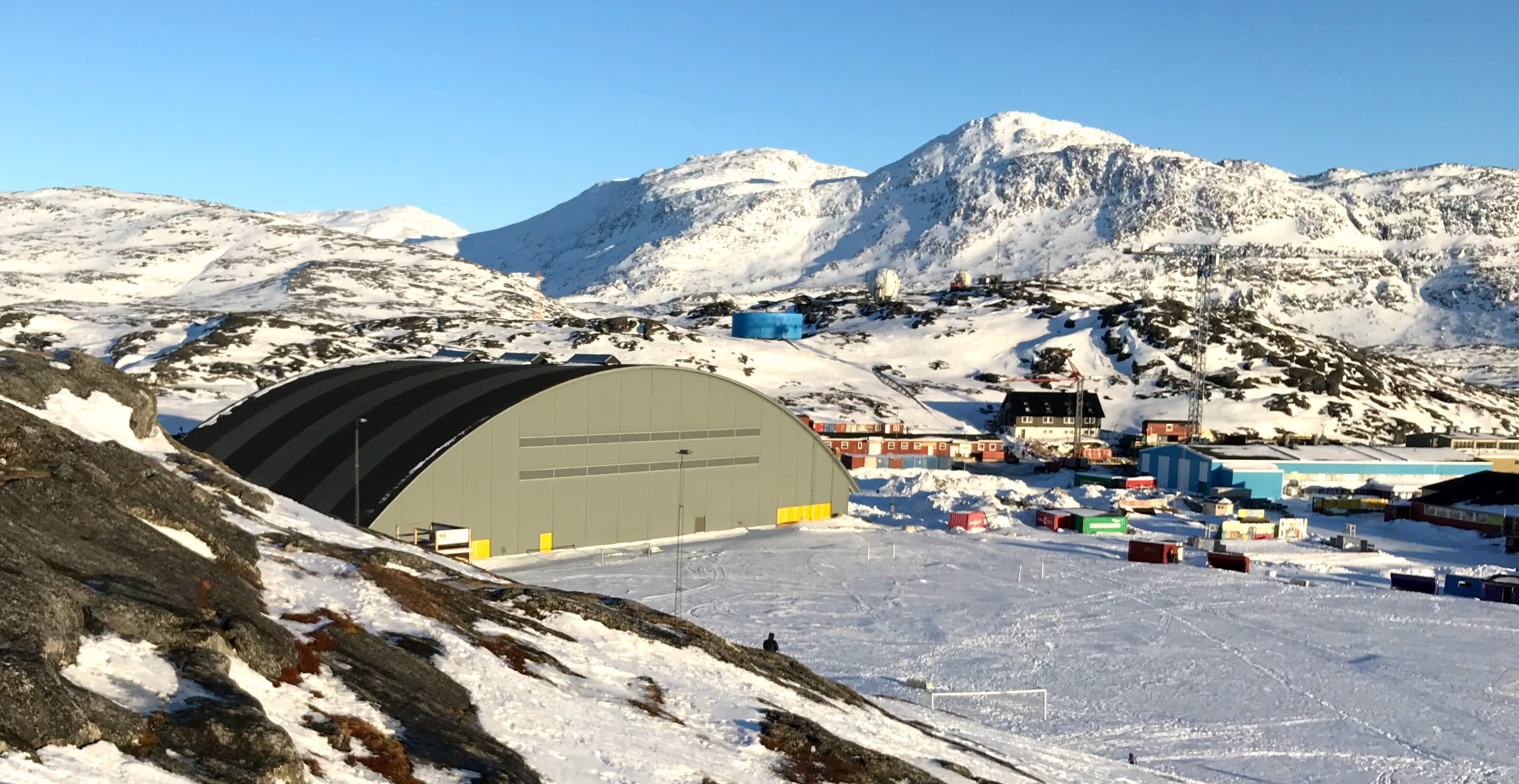
The team plays its home matches at the Inussivik in Nuuk, Greenland’s capital

The following players were called up for the 2023 Baltic-Nordic Futsal Cup.

- Karls Louis Sandgreen
- Niklas T. Johansen
- Hans Karl Berthelsen
- Patrick Frederiksen
- Niklas Thorleifsen
- Nick Reimer
- Bastian Rosing
- Karsten Andersen
- Malik Pedersen
- Rene Eriksen Petersen
- Aputsiaq Andersen
- John-Luvig Broberg
- Hans Ole Kleist
- Bror Bernhardsen
- Aiko Nielsen
- Henrik Kleist
- Aqqalooraq Møller Lund
- Henning Bajare

== Competitive record ==
=== Nordic Futsal Cup ===
Nordic Futsal Cup record
Year	Round	Pld	W	D	L	GS	GA	DIF
(Denmark) 2013	Did not enter							
(Finland) 2014	Did not enter							
(Sweden) 2016	5th	4	1	0	3	10	21	-11
(Norway) 2017	5th	4	0	2	2	9	14	-5
(Denmark) 2018	5th	4	0	0	4	9	24	-15
(Finland) 2019	4th	4	1	0	3	6	24	-18
(Sweden) 2021	4th	3	0	1	2	7	16	-9
(Norway) 2022	Did not enter							
(Denmark) 2023	6th	4	1	1	2	9	16	-7
Total		23	3	4	16	50	115	-65

=== Futsal Week ===
Futsal Week record
Year	Round	Pld	W	D	L	GS	GA	DIF
2016	Did not enter							
2017	Did not enter							
2018	Did not enter							
(Croatia) 2019	6th	3	0	0	3	9	17	-8
2020	Did not enter							
(Croatia) 2021	3rd	2	0	0	2	1	9	-8
(Croatia) 2022	3rd	2	0	1	1	1	4	-3
(Croatia) 2023	4th	4	1	0	3	5	14	-9
(Croatia) 2024	3rd	3	2	0	1	15	6	9
Total		14	3	1	10	31	50	-19
