= 2024 Futsal Week February Cup =

Tournament details
- Host country: Croatia
- City: Labin
- Teams: 5
- Venue: SC Franko Mileta

Final positions
- Champions: Denmark (1st title)
- Runners-up: San Marino
- Third place: Greenland
- Fourth place: Malta

Tournament statistics
- Top scorer: (San Marino) Danilo Busignani (6 goals)
- Best player: (Denmark) Ruben Winther
- Best goalkeeper: (Greenland) Ejvind Moller-Lund
- Fair play award: Denmark

The 2024 Futsal Week February Cup was an international men's futsal tournament, organized by Futsal Week, and held in Labin, Croatia from 31 January to 5 February 2024. The tournament was won by Denmark.

== Teams ==
Team	Appearance	Previous best performance
Denmark	2nd	Runners-up (Winter 2017)
Greenland	5th	Third place (Autumn 2021, November 2022)
Malta	2nd	Sixth place (Summer 2021)
San Marino	9th	Third place
Switzerland	2nd	Third place (Autumn 2017)

== Standings ==
Pos	Team	Pld	W	D	L	GF	GA	GD	Pts
1	Denmark	3	2	1	0	10	3	+7	7
2	San Marino	4	2	1	1	11	13	−2	7
3	Greenland	3	2	0	1	15	6	+9	6
4	Malta	4	1	1	2	11	15	−4	4
5	Switzerland	4	0	1	3	9	19	−10	1

Source: Futsal Planet
31 January 2024
16:00

Switzerland	3–5	Malta

SC Franko Mileta, Labin, Croatia

1 February 2024
16:00

Greenland	8–2	Switzerland

SC Franko Mileta, Labin, Croatia
1 February 2024
18:15

Malta	4–4	San Marino

SC Franko Mileta, Labin, Croatia

2 February 2024
16:00

Malta	1–3	Denmark

SC Franko Mileta, Labin, Croatia
2 February 2024
18:15

San Marino	4–2	Switzerland

SC Franko Mileta, Labin, Croatia

3 February 2024
16:00

Denmark	5–0	San Marino

SC Franko Mileta, Labin, Croatia
3 February 2024
18:15

Greenland	5–1	Malta

SC Franko Mileta, Labin, Croatia

4 February 2024
16:00

San Marino	3–2	Greenland

SC Franko Mileta, Labin, Croatia
4 February 2024
18:15

Switzerland	3–5	Denmark

SC Franko Mileta, Labin, Croatia
