= 2012 FIFA Futsal World Cup qualification (UEFA) =

- Dates
- Teams: (from 1 confederation)

Preliminary round matches was played from the 19 to 23 October and matches in the main Qualifying round was played from the 14 to 18 December.

== Preliminary round ==
=== Group A ===
The qualification was held in Tbilisi, Georgia

Team	Pld	W	D	L	GF	GA	GD	Pts
Moldova	3	1	2	0	14	4	+10	5
Georgia	3	1	2	0	14	4	+10	5
Armenia	3	1	2	0	8	4	+4	5
Malta	3	0	0	3	0	24	−24	0

Moldova went through by coefficient

20 October 2011

Georgia	2 – 2	Armenia
	Report

Referee: Gerd Bylois (BEL), Zoran Bogdanov (SRB)

20 October 2011

Moldova	10 – 0	Malta
	Report

Referee: Cédric Pelissier (FRA), Nikola Jelić (CRO)

21 October 2011

Georgia	10 – 0	Malta
	Report

Referee: Zoran Bogdanov (SRB), Nikola Jelić (CRO)

21 October 2011

Armenia	2 – 2	Moldova
	Report

Referee: Cédric Pelissier (FRA), Gerd Bylois (BEL)

23 October 2011

Malta	0 – 4	Armenia
	Report

Referee: Nikola Jelić (CRO), Cédric Pelissier (FRA)

23 October 2011

Moldova	2 – 2	Georgia
	Report

Referee: Gerd Bylois (BEL), Zoran Bogdanov (SRB)

=== Group B ===
The qualification was held in Sofia, Bulgaria

Team	Pld	W	D	L	GF	GA	GD	Pts
Bulgaria	3	2	0	1	15	8	+7	6
Norway	3	2	0	1	8	8	0	6
Greece	3	2	0	1	10	7	+3	6
Andorra	3	0	0	3	8	18	−10	0

19 October 2011

Bulgaria	8 – 4	Andorra
	Report

Referee: Kreshnik Hakrama (ALB), Maksim Dzeikala (BLR)

19 October 2011

Greece	3 – 1	Norway
	Report

Referee: Ilya Akimtsev (RUS), Dragan Skakić (BIH)

20 October 2011

Bulgaria	2 – 3	Norway
	Report

Referee: Maksim Dzeikala (BLR), Ilya Akimtsev (RUS)

20 October 2011

Andorra	1 – 6	Greece
	Report

Referee: Dragan Skakić (BIH), Kreshnik Hakrama (ALB)

22 October 2011

Norway	4 – 3	Andorra
	Report

Referee: Kreshnik Hakrama (ALB), Maksim Dzeikala (BLR)

22 October 2011

Greece	1 – 5	Bulgaria
	Report

Referee: Dragan Skakić (BIH), Ilya Akimtsev (RUS)

=== Group C ===
The qualification was held in Jelgava, Latvia

Team	Pld	W	D	L	GF	GA	GD	Pts
Latvia	3	2	1	0	18	4	+14	7
England	3	2	0	1	9	12	−3	6
Cyprus	3	1	1	1	7	6	+1	4
San Marino	3	0	0	3	5	17	−12	0

20 October 2011

Latvia	7 – 1	England
	Report

20 October 2011

Cyprus	3 – 1	San Marino
	Report

21 October 2011

Latvia	9 – 1	San Marino
	Report

21 October 2011

England	3 – 2	Cyprus
	Report

23 October 2011

San Marino	3 – 5	England
	Report

23 October 2011

Cyprus	2 – 2	Latvia
	Report

=== Group D ===
The qualification was held in Kiili, Estonia

Team	Pld	W	D	L	GF	GA	GD	Pts
Turkey	3	3	0	0	15	5	+10	9
Albania	3	1	1	1	7	8	−1	4
Finland	3	1	1	1	4	6	−2	4
Estonia	3	0	0	3	6	13	−7	0

20 October 2011
16:30 UTC+2

Finland	0 – 0	Albania
	Report

Kiili Sports Hall, Kiili, Estonia
Referee: Gavin Sartain (ENG), Slawomir Steczko (POL)

20 October 2011
19:00 UTC+2

Estonia	3 – 4	Turkey
	Report

Kiili Sports Hall, Kiili, Estonia
Referee: Gabriel Gherman (ROU), Slawomir Steczko (POL)

21 October 2011
16:30 UTC+2

Turkey	6 – 0	Finland
	Report

Kiili Sports Hall, Kiili, Estonia
Referee: Slawomir Steczko (POL), Gavin Sartain (ENG)

21 October 2011
19:00 UTC+2

Estonia	3 – 5	Albania
	Report

Kiili Sports Hall, Kiili, Estonia
Referee: Ramil Namazov (AZE), Gavin Sartain (ENG)

23 October 2011
16:30 UTC+2

Finland	4 – 0	Estonia
	Report

Kiili Sports Hall, Kiili, Estonia
Referee: Slawomir Steczko (POL), Ramil Namazov (AZE)

23 October 2011
19:00 UTC+2

Albania	2 – 5	Turkey
	Report

Kiili Sports Hall, Kiili, Estonia
Referee: Gavin Sartain (ENG), Gabriel Gherman (ROU)

=== Group E ===
The qualification was held in Veles, Macedonia

Team	Pld	W	D	L	GF	GA	GD	Pts
Macedonia	3	3	0	0	15	4	+11	9
France	3	2	0	1	12	6	+6	6
Montenegro	3	1	0	2	13	6	+7	3
Switzerland	3	0	0	3	2	26	−24	0

20 October 2011
18:00

France	7 – 0	Switzerland
	Report

Referee: Dimitrios Zisimopoulos (GRE), Demetris Constantinou (CYP), Vyacheslav Daragan (UKR)

20 October 2011
20:30

Macedonia	2 – 1	Montenegro
	Report

Referee: Aleksandrs Golubevs (LVA), Vyacheslav Daragan (UKR), Demetris Constantinou (CYP)

21 October 2011
18:00

Montenegro	3 – 4	France
	Report

Referee: Demetris Constantinou (CYP), Aleksandrs Golubevs (LVA), Dimitrios Zisimopoulos (GRE)

21 October 2011
20:30

Macedonia	10 – 2	Switzerland
	Report

Referee: Vyacheslav Daragan (UKR), Dimitrios Zisimopoulos (GRE), Aleksandrs Golubevs (LVA)

23 October 2011
16:30

Switzerland	0 – 9	Montenegro
	Report

Referee: Dimitrios Zisimopoulos (GRE), Aleksandrs Golubevs (LVA)

23 October 2011
19:00

France	1 – 3	Macedonia
	Report

Referee: Demetris Constantinou (CYP), Vyacheslav Daragan (UKR)

=== Best group runners-up ===
Team	Pld	W	D	L	GF	GA	GD	Pts
France	3	2	0	1	12	6	+6	6
Norway	3	2	0	1	8	8	0	6
England	3	2	0	1	9	12	−3	6
Georgia	3	1	2	0	14	4	+10	5
Albania	3	1	1	1	7	8	−1	4

== Qualifying round ==
The main round was played from 14 to 18 December 2011.

=== Group 1 ===
The qualification was held in Sarajevo, Bosnia and Herzegovina.

Team	Pld	W	D	L	GF	GA	GD	Pts
Spain	3	3	0	0	20	0	+20	9
Norway	3	1	1	1	5	12	−7	4
Bosnia and Herzegovina	3	1	0	2	3	9	−6	3
Belgium	3	0	1	2	4	11	−7	1

15 December 2011
17:00 CET

Spain	8 – 0	Norway
Fernandao 2'; Lozano 4', 12'; Lin 9'; Ortiz 16'; Julio Cordeiro 20', Borja 26'; Rafael Usín 31'	Report

Olympic Hall Juan Antonio Samaranch - Sarajevo
Referee: Bogdan Sorescu (ROU)

15 December 2011
19:30 CET

Bosnia and Herzegovina	2 – 1	Belgium
Lalić 36', 37'	Report	Chaibai 38'

Olympic Hall Juan Antonio Samaranch - Sarajevo
Referee: Gerald Bauernfeind (AUT)

16 December 2011
17:00 CET

Bosnia and Herzegovina	1 – 2	Norway
Lalić 22'	Report	Laajab 33'; Skaga 40'

Olympic Hall Juan Antonio Samaranch - Sarajevo
Referee: Dejan Nikolić (SVN)

16 December 2011
19:30 CET

Belgium	0 – 6	Spain
	Report	Lozano 4'; Borja 16'; Rafael Usín 18'; Torras 31'; Julio Cordeiro 39', 40' (pen.)

Olympic Hall Juan Antonio Samaranch - Sarajevo
Referee: Kamil Çetin (TUR)

18 December 2011
17:00 CET

Spain	6 – 0	Bosnia and Herzegovina
Fernandao 2', 35', 39', 41'; Lin 8'; Rafael Usín 25'	Report

Olympic Hall Juan Antonio Samaranch - Sarajevo
Referee: Gerald Bauernfeind (AUT)

18 December 2011
19:30 CET

Norway	3 – 3	Belgium
Skaga 18'; Sortevik 20'; Laajab 37'	Report	Canaris 20'; Achahbar 27'; Zouggaghi 31'

Olympic Hall Juan Antonio Samaranch - Sarajevo
Referee: Bogdan Sorescu (ROU)

=== Group 2 ===
The qualification was held in Caltanissetta, Italy.

Team	Pld	W	D	L	GF	GA	GD	Pts
Italy	3	3	0	0	19	5	+14	9
Romania	3	2	0	1	14	7	+7	6
Poland	3	1	0	2	10	18	−8	3
Bulgaria	3	0	0	3	5	18	−13	0

15 December 2011
17:30 CET

Romania	3 – 0	Bulgaria
Radu 19'; Dobre 31'; Matei 38'	Report

Palacarelli - Caltanissetta
Referee: Gábor Kovács (HUN)

15 December 2011
20:00 CET

Italy	5 – 2	Poland
Gabriel Lima 10'; Vampeta 19'; Honorio 21', 40', 41'	Report	Milewski 35'; Budniak 39'

Palacarelli - Caltanissetta
Referee: Timo Onatsu (FIN)

16 December 2011
17:30 CET

Poland	3 – 9	Romania
Budniak 18', 34'; Șotărcă 36' (o.g.)	Report	Gherman 3'; Stoica 8'; Matei 9', 38'; Dobre 11'; Alpar 13'; Răducu 24'; Șotărcă 31', 32'

Palacarelli - Caltanissetta
Referee: Gábor Kovács (HUN)

16 December 2011
20:00 CET

Italy	10 – 1	Bulgaria
Fortino 11'; Gabriel Lima 11', 23'; Honorio 17'; Ippoliti 21'; Saad Assis 25'; Torcivia 26', 41'; Leggiero 31'; Forte 34'	Report	Ivanov 18' (pen.)

Palacarelli - Caltanissetta
Referee: Timo Onatsu (FIN)

18 December 2011
16:30 CET

Bulgaria	4 – 5	Poland
Nestorov 13'; Trendafilov 21'; Viktorov 27'; Koychev 41'	Report	Machura 2'; Kielpiński 18', 40'; Kubik 19'; Kusia 39'

Palacarelli - Caltanissetta
Referee: Saša Tomić (CRO)

18 December 2011
19:00 CET

Romania	2 – 4	Italy
Stoica 37', 40'	Report	Fortino 20'; Patias 34'; Vampeta 40'; Forte 41'

Palacarelli - Caltanissetta
Referee: Gábor Kovács (HUN)

=== Group 3 ===
The qualification was held in Laško, Slovenia.

Team	Pld	W	D	L	GF	GA	GD	Pts
Serbia	3	2	1	0	11	5	+6	7
Slovenia	3	2	0	1	10	6	+4	6
Israel	3	0	2	1	9	10	−1	2
Moldova	3	0	1	2	4	13	−9	1

15 December 2011
18:00 CET

Slovenia	3 – 2	Israel
Čujec 16'; Drobne 20'; Osredkar 29'	Report	Tsabag 16'; Shriki 35'

Tri Lilije Hall
Referee: Ivan Shabanov (RUS)

15 December 2011
20:30 CET

Serbia	4 – 0	Moldova
Janjić 2'; Milosavac 9'; Rajčević 11'; Bojović 32'	Report

Tri Lilije Hall
Referee: Petros Panayides (CYP)

16 December 2011
18:00 CET

Israel	4 – 4	Serbia
Kalif 3', 28'; Shriki 11'; Tsabag 32'	Report	Rajčević 12', 12' (pen.), 16' (pen.); Milosavac 12'

Tri Lilije Hall
Referee: Robert Pieter Lenting (NED)

16 December 2011
20:30 CET

Slovenia	6 – 1	Moldova
Pertič 3', 13'; R. Uršič 17', 18'; Drobne 21'; Grzelj 36'	Report	Antonov 10'

Tri Lilije Hall
Referee: Marc Birkett (ENG)

18 December 2011
15:30 CET

Moldova	3 – 3	Israel
Hilotii 27', 39'; Tacot 41'	Report	Shriki 4', 23'; A. Cohen 31'

Tri Lilije Hall
Referee: Petros Panayides (CYP)

18 December 2011
18:00 CET

Serbia	3 – 1	Slovenia
Kocić 4'; Živanović 12', 41'	Report	R. Uršič 25'

Tri Lilije Hall
Referee: Ivan Shabanov (RUS)

=== Group 4 ===
The qualification was held in Coimbra, Portugal.

Team	Pld	W	D	L	GF	GA	GD	Pts
Portugal	3	3	0	0	14	1	+13	9
Slovakia	3	2	0	1	8	8	0	6
France	3	1	0	2	4	11	−7	3
Lithuania	3	0	0	3	4	10	−6	0

15 December 2011
18:30 CET

Slovakia	3 – 1	France
Haľko 10'; Rafaj 35'; Kozar 41'	Report	Chaulet 34'

Pavilhão Multidesportos Dr. Mário Mexia - Coimbra
Referee: Sebastian Stawicki (POL)

15 December 2011
21:15 CET

Portugal	3 – 0	Lithuania
Pedro Cary 8'; Cardinal 22'; Ricardinho 33'	Report

Pavilhão Multidesportos Dr. Mário Mexia - Coimbra
Referee: Danijel Janošević (CRO)

16 December 2011
18:30 CET

Lithuania	2 – 4	Slovakia
Rimkevičius 7'; Jeremejevas 33'	Report	Rafaj 11'; Serbin 12'; Haľko 14'; Rick 32'

Pavilhão Multidesportos Dr. Mário Mexia - Coimbra
Referee: Elchin Samadli (AZE)

16 December 2011
21:15 CET

Portugal	6 – 0	France
Ricardinho 2'; Pedro Cary 3'; Cardinal 4', 5', 25'; Marinho 11'	Report

Pavilhão Multidesportos Dr. Mário Mexia - Coimbra
Referee: Kiazo Leladze (LVA)

18 December 2011
15:30 CET

France	3 – 2	Lithuania
Otmani 16', 40'; Teixeira 29'	Report	Rimkevičius 4'; Bezykornovas 21'

Pavilhão Multidesportos Dr. Mário Mexia - Coimbra
Referee: Sebastian Stawicki (POL)

18 December 2011
18:00 CET

Slovakia	1 – 5	Portugal
Mikita 13'	Report	Cardinal 21', 31'; Joel Queirós 23'; João Matos 31'; Ricardo 34'

Pavilhão Multidesportos Dr. Mário Mexia - Coimbra
Referee: Kiazo Leladze (LVA)

=== Group 5 ===
The qualification was held in Baku, Azerbaijan.

Team	Pld	W	D	L	GF	GA	GD	Pts
Ukraine	3	2	0	1	8	6	+2	6
Azerbaijan	3	2	0	1	12	6	+6	6
Croatia	3	2	0	1	8	6	+2	6
Macedonia	3	0	0	3	3	13	−10	0

15 December 2011
15:30 CET

Ukraine	2 – 1	North Macedonia
Ovsyannikov 27'; Kordoba 35'	Report	Micevski 5'

İdman Sarayı - Baku
Referee: Balázs Farkas (HUN)

15 December 2011
18:00 CET

Azerbaijan	1 – 3	Croatia
Borisov 36'	Report	Grcić 29'; Marinović 35'; Despotović 41' (pen.)

İdman Sarayı - Baku
Referee: Karel Henych (CZE)

16 December 2011
15:30 CET

Croatia	1 – 4	Ukraine
Babić 39'	Report	Cheporniuk 3'; Pavlenko 19'; Ovsyannikov 27', 32'

İdman Sarayı - Baku
Referee: Stephan Kammerer (GER)

16 December 2011
18:00 CET

Azerbaijan	7 – 1	North Macedonia
Felipe 11', 17', 17'; Dantas 16'; Farajzade 23'; Balakishiyev 33'; Hajiyev 34'	Report	Petrović 36'

İdman Sarayı - Baku
Referee: Gerd Bylois (BEL)

18 December 2011
15:30 CET

North Macedonia	1 – 4	Croatia
Micevski 20'	Report	Šuton 5'; Marinović 14', 39'; Grcić 31'

İdman Sarayı - Baku
Referee: Karel Henych (CZE)

18 December 2011
18:00 CET

Ukraine	2 – 4	Azerbaijan
Rogachov 13'; Romanov 29'	Report	Felipe 15'; Farajzade 27'; Serjão 35'; Borisov 36'

İdman Sarayı - Baku
Referee: Balázs Farkas (HUN)

=== Group 6 ===
The qualification was held in Brno, Czech Republic.

Team	Pld	W	D	L	GF	GA	GD	Pts
Czech Republic	3	3	0	0	13	5	+8	9
Belarus	3	2	0	1	11	6	+5	6
Netherlands	3	1	0	2	5	10	−5	3
Turkey	3	0	0	3	6	14	−8	0

15 December 2011
16:00 CET

Czech Republic	5 – 1	Netherlands
Rešetár 2', 26'; R. Mareš 5'; Seidler 9'; M. Mareš I 37'	Report	El Morabiti 20'

Královo Pole - Brno
Referee: Pascal Fritz (FRA)

15 December 2011
18:30 CET

Belarus	7 – 1	Turkey
Gorbenko 5', 24'; Savintsev 7'; Chibisov 21', 30'; Chernik 33', 36'	Report	Kenan Köseoğlu 6'

Královo Pole - Brno
Referee: Francisco Miguel Pena Diaz (ESP)

16 December 2011
18:00 CET

Czech Republic	3 – 2	Turkey
Kopecký 4', 24'; Rešetár 11'	Report	Büyüktopaç 15'; Burak Yıldırım 40'

Královo Pole - Brno
Referee: Oleg Ivanov (UKR)

16 December 2011
20:30 CET

Netherlands	0 – 2	Belarus
	Report	Chernik 17'; Popov 35'

Královo Pole - Brno
Referee: Aleksandras Sliva (LTU)

18 December 2011
15:30 CET

Turkey	3 – 4	Netherlands
Serhat Çiçek 7'; Burak Yıldırım 36'; İsmail Çelen 40'	Report	Adil Zouthane 6' (pen.), 32', 38'; Saadouni 14'

Královo Pole - Brno
Referee: Pascal Fritz (FRA)

18 December 2011
18:00 CET

Belarus	2 – 5	Czech Republic
Chernik 15'; Popov 17'	Report	Rešetár 3', 37'; Janovský 10'; Kadakov 13' (o.g.); J. Novotný 25'

Královo Pole - Brno
Referee: Francisco Miguel Pena Diaz (ESP)

=== Group 7 ===
The qualification was held in Gyöngyös, Hungary.

Team	Pld	W	D	L	GF	GA	GD	Pts
Russia	3	3	0	0	10	2	+8	9
Hungary	3	1	1	1	10	8	+2	4
Latvia	3	0	2	1	5	7	−2	2
Kazakhstan	3	0	1	2	3	11	−8	1

15 December 2011
16:00 CET

Russia	2 – 0	Latvia
Badretdinov 12'; Maevski 17'	Report

Gyöngyösi Városi Sport és Rendezvény Csarnok - Gyöngyös
Referee: Fernando Gutiérrez Lumbreras (ESP)

15 December 2011
18:30 CET

Hungary	5 – 1	Kazakhstan
Gyurcsányi 6'; Németh P. 15', 40'; Dróth 17'; Lódi 35'	Report	Yesenamanov 21'

Gyöngyösi Városi Sport és Rendezvény Csarnok - Gyöngyös
Referee: Francesco Massini (ITA)

16 December 2011
16:00 CET

Kazakhstan	0 – 4	Russia
	Report	Kazakov 9' (o.g.); Maevski 24'; Sergeev 37'; Nugumanov 39'

Gyöngyösi Városi Sport és Rendezvény Csarnok - Gyöngyös
Referee: Franco Cachia (MLT)

16 December 2011
18:30 CET

Hungary	3 – 3	Latvia
Csopaki 4'; Lódi 7'; Harnisch 40'	Report	Šustrovs 9'; Dacko 15'; Zabarovskis 31'

Gyöngyösi Városi Sport és Rendezvény Csarnok - Gyöngyös
Referee: Sreten Vasić (SRB)

18 December 2011
16:00 CET

Latvia	2 – 2	Kazakhstan
Seņs 21' (pen.), 37' (pen.)	Report	Taku 23'; Dovgan 35'

Gyöngyösi Városi Sport és Rendezvény Csarnok - Gyöngyös
Referee: Francesco Massini (ITA)

18 December 2011
18:30 CET

Russia	4 – 2	Hungary
Abramov 2'; Cirilo 6'; Maevski 17'; Sergeev 40'	Report	Harnisch 30'; Dróth 39'

Gyöngyösi Városi Sport és Rendezvény Csarnok - Gyöngyös
Referee: Fernando Gutiérrez Lumbreras (ESP)

== Play-offs ==
The top two in each progress to the two-legged play-offs, which will decide Europe's qualifiers.

Key to colours
Seeded in play-offs draw
Unseeded in play-offs draw

Group	Winners	Runners-up
1	Spain	Norway
2	Italy	Romania
3	Serbia	Slovenia
4	Portugal	Slovakia
5	Ukraine	Azerbaijan
6	Czech Republic	Belarus
7	Russia	Hungary

Team 1	Agg.	Team 2	1st leg	2nd leg
Slovakia	0–12	Spain	0–4	0–8
Azerbaijan	4–5	Russia	2–3	2–2
Norway	0–7	Italy	0–5	0–2
Belarus	2–11	Portugal	1–7	1–4
Slovenia	3–4	Czech Republic	2–0	1–4
Romania	4–5	Ukraine	0–4	4–1
Hungary	2–6	Serbia	1–0	1–6

=== 1st leg ===
From 25 March to 28 March 2012

25 March 2012
18:00 CET

Hungary	1 – 0	Serbia
Lovas 34'	Report

Gyöngyösi Városi Sport es Rendezvény Csarnok, Gyöngyös
Attendance: 1,100
Referee: Ivan Shabanov (RUS)

26 March 2012
17:00 CET

Belarus	1 – 7	Portugal
Chernik 7'	Report	Ricardinho 2', 15', 22'; Arnaldo Pereira 18'; Marinho 22'; Jorge Fernandes 27'; Cardinal 35'

Minsk Arena, Minsk
Referee: Sebastian Stawicki (POL)

26 March 2012
18:30 CET

Slovenia	2 – 0	Czech Republic
Fetić 9'; Uršič 29'	Report

Sporthall Velenje, Velenje
Referee: Francesco Massini (ITA)

26 March 2012
19:45 CET

Slovakia	0 – 4	Spain
	Report	Aicardo 23', 34'; Fernandão 30'; Rafa Usín 32'

Interhala Pasienky, Bratislava
Referee: Bogdan Sorescu (ROU)

27 March 2012
17:00 CET

Romania	0 – 4	Ukraine
	Report	Fedorchenko 1'; Struk 5'; Rogachov 19'; Zhurba 33'

CS CITY'US Tirgu-Mures, Târgu Mureș
Referee: Pascal Lemal (BEL)

27 March 2012
18:00 CET

Azerbaijan	2 – 3	Russia
Kaká 36'; Hajiyev 39'	Report	Milovanov 12'; Sergeev 23', 30'

Sarhadchi Sports Olympic Center, Baku
Referee: Borut Šivic (SVN)

28 March 2012
18:30 CET

Norway	0 – 5	Italy
	Report	Vampeta 4', 20'; Patias 22'; Gabriel Lima 34'; Fortino 37'

Stjørdalshallen, Stjørdal
Referee: Stephan Kammerer (GER)

=== 2nd leg ===
From 8 to 11 April 2012

8 April 2012
13:00 CET

Ukraine	1 – 4	Romania
Romanov 21'	Report	Stoica 19', 20', 27'; Ignat 24'

Palace of Sport "Lokomotiv", Kharkiv
Referee: Fernando Lumbreras (ESP)

Ukraine won 5–4 on aggregate.

8 April 2012
17:00 CET

Serbia	6 – 1	Hungary
Pršić 9', 19'; Rajčević 14', 20'; Janjić 15'; Živanović 30'	Report	Lódi 35'

Hala Pionir, Belgrade
Attendance: 3,000
Referee: Eduardo Fernandes Coelho (POR)

Serbia won 6–2 on aggregate.

9 April 2012
15:00 CET

Russia	2 – 2	Azerbaijan
Pereverzev 4'; Fukin 21'	Report	Serjão 17'; Jadder Dantas 29'

Centralny, Tyumen
Referee: Karel Henych (CZE)

Russia won 5–4 on aggregate.

10 April 2012
20:30 CET

Spain	8 – 0	Slovakia
Álvaro 6'; José Ruiz 17'; Lozano 17', 27', 27'; Rafa Usín 28'; Lin 35'; Miguelín 37'	Report

Palma Arena, Palma de Mallorca
Referee: Gábor Kovács (HUN)

Spain won 12–0 on aggregate.

10 April 2012
21:15 CET

Portugal	4 – 1	Belarus
Arnaldo Pereira 14'; Pedro Cary 28'; Jorge Fernandes 28'; Leitão 38'	Report	Gorbenko 29'

Pavilhão do SL Benfica, Lisbon
Referee: Danijel Janošević (CRO)

Portugal won 11–2 on aggregate.

11 April 2012
18:00 CET

Czech Republic	4 – 1	Slovenia
Roman Mareš 6' 26'; Rešetár 38'; Kopecký 11'	Report	Pertič 2'

Sparta Praha, Prague
Referee: Oleg Ivanov (UKR)

Czech Republic won 4–3 on aggregate.

11 April 2012
20:30 CET

Italy	2 – 0	Norway
Saad 2'; Forte 21'	Report

Pala San Giacomo, Conversano
Referee: Petros Panayides (CYP)

Italy won 7–0 on aggregate.

== Qualified teams ==
1. Serbia
2. Ukraine
3. Russia
4. Spain
5. Portugal
6. Czech Republic
7. Italy
