= 2016 Nordic Futsal Cup =

Tournament details
- Host country: Sweden
- Dates: 30 November–4 December 2016
- Teams: 5 (from 1 confederation)
- Venue(s): 2 (in 2 host cities)

Final positions
- Champions: Finland (2nd title)
- Runners-up: Sweden
- Third place: Denmark
- Fourth place: Norway

Tournament statistics
- Matches played: 10
- Goals scored: 55 (5.5 per match)

The 2016 Nordic Futsal Cup was held from 30 November to 4 December 2016 in Skövde and Jönköping, Sweden.

== Standings ==
Team	Pld	W	D	L	GF	GA	GD	Pts
Finland	4	4	0	0	16	5	+11	12
Sweden	4	2	1	1	11	4	+7	7
Denmark	4	1	1	2	10	11	−1	4
Norway	4	1	0	3	6	12	−6	3
Greenland	4	1	0	3	10	21	−11	3

Source: Svenskfotboll.se

== Matches ==
30 November 2016
15:00

Finland	4–0	Norway
Kytölä 14'; Autio 17', 26'; Hosio 18'

Arena Skövde, Skövde
Referee: Fredric Nilholt (Sweden)
30 November 2016
17:30

Denmark	2–2	Sweden
Ostojic 25' (o.g.); Fogt 32'		Ostojic 9', 32'

Arena Skövde, Skövde
Attendance: 863
Referee: Omar Rafiq (Norway)

1 December 2016
15:00

Denmark	0–2	Norway
		Ovesen 17', 20'

Arena Skövde, Skövde
Attendance: 128
Referee: Toni Lehtinen (Finland)
1 December 2016
17:30

Finland	6–4	Greenland
Hosio ?'; Vanha ?', ?'; Istrefi ?'; Rautiainen ?'; Alasuutari ?'		Hermann ?'; Jensen ?'; Funch ?'; Broberg ?'

Arena Skövde, Skövde
Attendance: 136
Referee: Omar Rafiq (Norway)

2 December 2016
15:00

Norway	3–4	Greenland
Espegren ?'; Schjetne ?'; Vucenovic ?'		Jensen ?'; Petersen ?'; Thorleifsen ?'; Unknown ?' (o.g.)

Jönköpings idrottshus, Jönköping
Referee: Kirill Naishouler (Finland)
2 December 2016
19:30

Sweden	0–1	Finland
		Kytölä 30'

Jönköpings idrottshus, Jönköping
Attendance: 1,094
Referee: Omar Rafiq (Norway)

3 December 2016
13:00

Denmark	7–2	Greenland
Christoffersen 3'; El-Ouaz 11'; Badran 23', 29'; Jørgensen 26'; Rasmussen 38'; Mehlsen 39'		Reimer 4'; Madsen 34'

Arena Skövde, Skövde
Referee: Ademir Avdic (Sweden)
3 December 2016
15:30

Norway	1-4	Sweden
Espegren 37'		Rossi 2'; Asp 16'; Legiec 22', 39'

Arena Skövde, Skövde
Referee: David Nissen (Denmark)

4 December 2016
14:00

Finland	5–1	Denmark
Hosio 10'; Junno 13', 25'; Tirkkonen 30', 38'		Fogt 26'

Arena Skövde, Skövde
Referee: Omar Rafiq (Norway)
4 December 2016
16:30

Sweden	5–0	Greenland
Asp 6'; Söderqvist 7', 23'; Kaplan 35'; Abraham 37'

Arena Skövde, Skövde
Referee: Kirill Naishouler (Finland)

== Goalscorers ==
3 goals

- (Finland) Miika Hosio

2 goals

- (Denmark) Ibrahim Badran
- (Denmark) Adam Fogt
- (Finland) Panu Autio
- (Finland) Jarmo Junno
- (Finland) Mikko Kytölä
- (Finland) Rami Tirkkonen
- (Finland) Iiro Vanha
- (Greenland) Markus Jensen
- (Norway) Niklas Espegren
- (Norway) Kim Rune Ovesen
- (Sweden) Nicklas Asp
- (Sweden) Stefan Ostojic
- (Sweden) Kristian Legiec
- (Sweden) Fredrik Söderqvist

1 goal

- (Denmark) Lukas Christoffersen
- (Denmark) Zakaria El-Ouaz
- (Denmark) Kevin Jørgensen
- (Denmark) Jannik Mehlsen
- (Denmark) Magnus Rasmussen
- (Finland) Jaakko Alasuutari
- (Finland) Arber Istrefi
- (Finland) Markus Rautianinen
- (Greenland) Johan Broberg
- (Greenland) Fredrik Funch
- (Greenland) Ari Hermann
- (Greenland) Katu Madsen
- (Greenland) Nikki Petersen
- (Greenland) Nick Reimer
- (Greenland) Niklas Thorleifsen
- (Norway) Tobias Schjetne
- (Norway) Milos Vucenovic
- (Sweden) Sargon Abraham
- (Sweden) Aday Kaplan
- (Sweden) Emilio Rossi

Own goal

- (Norway) Unknown (against Greenland)
- (Sweden) Stefan Ostojic (against Denmark)
