= 2028 FIFA Futsal World Cup qualification (UEFA) =

Tournament details
- Dates: Preliminary Round: 7 – 14 April 2026; Main Round: 14 October 2026 – 3 March 2027; Elite Round: 6 September 2027 – 19 April 2028
- Teams: 48 (from 1 confederation)

Tournament statistics
- Matches played: 77
- Goals scored: 492 (6.39 per match)
- Top scorer(s): (Kosovo) Ramadan Alaj (7 goals)
- All statistics correct as of 11 November 2026.

The European qualifying competition for the 2028 FIFA Futsal World Cup is a men's futsal competition that will determine the seven UEFA teams in the 2028 FIFA Futsal World Cup.

== Format ==
The qualifying competition consists of five stages:

- Preliminary round: The lowest-ranked 24 teams play in the preliminary round, and are drawn into six groups of four teams. The winners and runners-up of each group advance to the main round to join the 24 highest-ranked teams, which receive byes to the main round.
- Main round: The 36 teams are drawn into twelve groups of three. The 12 winners and four best runners-up progress directly to the elite round. The remaining eight runners-up enter the main round play-offs.
- Main round play-offs: The eight teams are drawn into four ties, to be played home and away. The four winners of the ties complete the elite round line-up.
- Elite round: The 20 teams are drawn into five groups of four. The winners of each group qualify directly for the World Cup, while the four best runners-up advance to the play-offs.
- Elite round play-offs: The four teams are drawn into two ties to play home-and-away two-legged matches to determine the last two European qualified teams. If only two teams enter, a draw will be held to determine the order of matches.

In the preliminary round, each group is played as a round-robin mini-tournament at the pre-selected hosts.

In the main and the elite round, each team plays one home and one away match against each of the other teams in its group.

=== Tiebreakers ===
In the preliminary round teams are ranked according to points (3 points for a win, 1 point for a draw, 0 points for a loss), and if tied on points, the following tiebreaking criteria are applied, in the order given, to determine the rankings (Regulations Articles 15.01 and 15.02):

1. Points in head-to-head matches among tied teams;
2. Goal difference in head-to-head matches among tied teams;
3. Goals scored in head-to-head matches among tied teams;
4. If more than two teams are tied, and after applying all head-to-head criteria above, a subset of teams is still tied, all head-to-head criteria above are reapplied exclusively to this subset of teams;
5. Goal difference in all group matches;
6. Goals scored in all group matches;
7. Penalty shoot-out if only two teams have the same number of points, and they met in the last round of the group and are tied after applying all criteria above (not used if more than two teams have the same number of points, or if their rankings are not relevant for qualification for the next stage);
8. Disciplinary points (red card = 3 points, yellow card = 1 point, expulsion for two yellow cards in one match = 3 points);
9. UEFA coefficient;

In the main and the elite round, teams are ranked according to points (3 points for a win, 1 point for a draw, 0 points for a loss), and if tied on points, the following tiebreaking criteria are applied, in the order given, to determine the rankings (Regulations Articles 15.01 and 15.02):

1. Points in head-to-head matches among tied teams;
2. Goal difference in head-to-head matches among tied teams;
3. Goals scored in head-to-head matches among tied teams;
4. If more than two teams are tied, and after applying all head-to-head criteria above, a subset of teams is still tied, all head-to-head criteria above are reapplied exclusively to this subset of teams;
5. Goal difference in all group matches;
6. Goals scored in all group matches;
7. Penalty shoot-out if only two teams have the same number of points, and they met in the last round of the group and are tied after applying all criteria above (not used if more than two teams have the same number of points, or if their rankings are not relevant for qualification for the next stage);
8. Away goals scored in all group matches;
9. Wins in all group matches;
10. Away wins in all group matches;
11. Disciplinary points (red card = 3 points, yellow card = 1 point, expulsion for two yellow cards in one match = 3 points);
12. UEFA coefficient used for the group phase draw;

In the play-offs, the team that scores more goals on aggregate over the two legs qualifies for the final tournament. As there is no away goals rule, if the aggregate score is level, an extra time of two 5-minute periods is played. If both teams score the same number of goals or no goals are scored during extra time, the tie is decided by penalty shoot-out (Regulations Article 16.01).

== Teams ==
The 48 teams were seeded according to the coefficient ranking. Seeded teams were determined based on December 2025 UEFA coefficient (shown in brackets). Six teams were pre-selected as hosts for the preliminary round. The draw for the preliminary round was held on 12 December 2025.

Teams entering main round	Teams entering preliminary round
Portugal (1)	Sweden (26)
Spain (2)	Latvia (27)
Kazakhstan (4)	North Macedonia (28)
Ukraine (5)	Kosovo (29)
France (6)	Greece (30)
Croatia (7)	Denmark (31)
Italy (8)	Montenegro (32)
Slovenia (9)	Norway (33)
Czech Republic (10)	Andorra (34)
Poland (11)	Lithuania (35)
Netherlands (12)	England (36)
Armenia (13)	Albania (37)
Georgia (14)	Turkey (38)
Belarus (15)	Cyprus (39)
Slovakia (16)	Israel (40)
Finland (17)	Switzerland (42)
Belgium (18)	Malta (43)
Serbia (19)	Austria (44)
Hungary (20)	Bulgaria (45)
Romania (21)	Gibraltar (46)
Bosnia and Herzegovina (22)	Estonia (47)
Moldova (23)	San Marino (48)
Germany (24)	Scotland (49)
Azerbaijan (25)	Northern Ireland (50)

Did not enter
Wales (41)	Republic of Ireland (NR)	Iceland (NR)
Luxembourg (NR)	Faroe Islands (NR)	Liechtenstein (NR)

Banned
Russia (3)

Notes

- NR – No rank (Team has been inactive on the previous 36 months)

== Preliminary round ==
The winners and runners-up of each group advanced to the main round to join the 24 teams which receive byes. The preliminary round was scheduled to be played between 7 and 14 April 2026.

Times are CEST (UTC+2), as listed by UEFA (local times, if different, are in parentheses).

=== Group A ===
Pos	Team	Pld	W	D	L	GF	GA	GD	Pts	Qualification
1	Andorra	3	3	0	0	20	3	+17	9	Main round
2	Denmark (H)	3	2	0	1	11	7	+4	6	Main round
3	Malta	3	1	0	2	5	13	−8	3	
4	Scotland	3	0	0	3	4	17	−13	0	

Source: UEFA
Rules for classification: Tiebreakers
(H) Hosts
8 April 2026
15:30

Andorra	10–0	Scotland
Josep Segura 1'54", 8'19", 34'29"; Aloulou 3'34" (o.g.); Adrià Blat 17'43", 30'06"; Mesquita 18'57"; Dos Santos 23'11"; Christian Regalo 24'41"; San Segundo 28'43"	Report

Park Vendia Hallen, Hjorring
Attendance: 82
Referee: Telmen Undrakh (Norway), Hakan Tezcan (Turkey)
8 April 2026
18:30

Malta	1–5	Denmark
Cope 25'14"	Report	Gantzhorn 4'06"; Rasmussen 6'30", 19'22"; Børsting 19'44"; El-Ouaz 33'43"

Park Vendia Hallen, Hjorring
Attendance: 621
Referee: George Jansizian (Sweden), Ayberg Öz (Turkey)

9 April 2026
15:30

Malta	0–5	Andorra
	Report	Rodríguez 2'05"; Christian Regalo 13'05", 37'25"; Dos Santos 20'28"; Josep Segura 29'15"

Park Vendia Hallen, Hjorring
Attendance: 71
Referee: Ayberg Öz (Turkey), Telmen Undrakh (Norway)
9 April 2026
18:30

Denmark	3–1	Scotland
Kasumovic 12'18"; Jægergaard 24'45"; El-Ouaz 39'27"	Report	Angus 32'15"

Park Vendia Hallen, Hjorring
Attendance: 648
Referee: Hakan Tezcan (Turkey), George Jansizian (Sweden)

11 April 2026
12:00

Scotland	3–4	Malta
Telisi 10'50" (o.g.); Lawless 23'16"; Angus 29'11"	Report	Cope 11'54"; C. Alves 27'54"; Telisi 37'26"; Maikinho 38'46"

Park Vendia Hallen, Hjorring
Attendance: 87
Referee: Ayberg Öz (Turkey), Hakan Tezcan (Turkey)
11 April 2026
15:00

Denmark	3–5	Andorra
Rasmussen 19'59"; Kasumovic 20'31"; Kristensen 29'45"	Report	C. Bové 15'32"; Christian Regalo 17'57", 37'51"; Dos Santos 27'44"; Oriol Rodriguez 37'16"

Park Vendia Hallen, Hjorring
Attendance: 810
Referee: Telmen Undrakh (Norway), George Jansizian (Sweden)

=== Group B ===
Pos	Team	Pld	W	D	L	GF	GA	GD	Pts	Qualification
1	Sweden	3	2	1	0	6	4	+2	7	Main round
2	Northern Ireland	3	1	1	1	12	11	+1	4	Main round
3	England (H)	3	1	0	2	15	9	+6	3	
4	Switzerland	3	0	2	1	4	13	−9	2	

Source: UEFA
Rules for classification: Tiebreakers
(H) Hosts
7 April 2026
16:00

Sweden	3–2	Northern Ireland
Hiseni 3'50"; Smajlovic 22'21"; Johansson 39'03"	Report	Furublad 27'34" (o.g.); Stapleton 37'38"

Sir David Wallace Sports Hall, Loughborough
Attendance: 211
Referee: David Urdánoz (Spain), Antonio Dimundo (Italy)
7 April 2026
20:30

Switzerland	0–9	England
	Report	Amorim 3'30", 16'13", 24'24"; Ward 9'53", 30'26"; Goldstein 10'25"; Tozer 15'25"; Adubofour 34'06"; Jaggi 38'47" (o.g.)

Sir David Wallace Sports Hall, Loughborough
Attendance: 330
Referee: Rastislav Behancin (Slovakia), Igors Jacevičs (Latvia)

8 April 2026
16:00

Switzerland	1–1	Sweden
Kägi 26'41"	Report	Smajlovic 2'18"

Sir David Wallace Sports Hall, Loughborough
Attendance: 245
Referee: Igors Jacevičs (Latvia), David Urdánoz (Spain)
8 April 2026
20:30

England	5–7	Northern Ireland
Adubofour 1'29", 37'33"; Ward 8'11"; Jefferies 9'13"; Goldstein 35'19"	Report	Millar 2'47", 38'57"; Sims 8'59" (o.g.); L. McMenemy 15'38", 22'32"; R. McMenemy 25'08"; Best 37'40"

Sir David Wallace Sports Hall, Loughborough
Attendance: 432
Referee: Antonio Dimundo (Italy), Rastislav Behancin (Slovakia)

10 April 2026
16:00

Northern Ireland	3–3	Switzerland
Millar 8'49"; Barr 17'35"; Roohi 18'40"	Report	S. Ljamalari 2'22"; Stapleton 19'50" (o.g.); Lanzendorfer 39'18"

Sir David Wallace Sports Hall, Loughborough
Attendance: 234
Referee: Antonio Dimundo (Italy), Igors Jacevičs (Latvia)
10 April 2026
20:30

England	1–2	Sweden
Ward 21'56"	Report	Rydberg 7'12"; Söderqvist 39'35"

Sir David Wallace Sports Hall, Loughborough
Attendance: 582
Referee: David Urdánoz (Spain), Rastislav Behancin (Slovakia)

=== Group C ===
Pos	Team	Pld	W	D	L	GF	GA	GD	Pts	Qualification
1	North Macedonia	3	3	0	0	11	4	+7	9	Main round
2	Lithuania (H)	3	1	1	1	7	5	+2	4	Main round
3	Turkey	3	1	1	1	14	13	+1	4	
4	Bulgaria	3	0	0	3	4	14	−10	0	

Source: UEFA
Rules for classification: Tiebreakers
(H) Hosts
9 April 2026
15:30

North Macedonia	4–1	Bulgaria
Krstevski 2'00"; Ramadani 8'48", 39'14"; Petrovski 38'21"	Report	Baharov 21'01"

LSC Druskininkai Hall, Druskininkai
Attendance: 40
Referee: Petar Radojcic (Serbia), Oliver Rodriguez-Ballinger (England)
9 April 2026
18:30

Turkey	4–4	Lithuania
Umur Ağır 16'28", 20'50"; Kahan Özcan 23'30"; Avci 24'18"	Report	Zagurskas 9'05"; Spietinis 26'39", 32'42"; Raštutis 37'33"

LSC Druskininkai Hall, Druskininkai
Attendance: 105
Referee: Martin Køster (Denmark), Danilo Francalanza (Malta)

10 April 2026
15:30

Turkey	3–6	North Macedonia
Umur Ağır 17'38"; Burak Uğurlu 25'15", 25'36"	Report	Ismaili 1'31"; Kirevski 8'45", 38'31"; Burak Uğurlu 11'34" (o.g.); Blagojevski 19'20"; Ramadan 32'49"

LSC Druskininkai Hall, Druskininkai
Attendance: 35
Referee: Danilo Francalanza (Malta), Petar Radojcic (Serbia)
10 April 2026
18:30

Lithuania	3–0	Bulgaria
Derendiajev 15'51", 35'09"; Zagurskas 35'27"	Report

LSC Druskininkai Hall, Druskininkai
Attendance: 140
Referee: Oliver Rodriguez-Ballinger (England), Martin Køster (Denmark)

12 April 2026
13:00

Bulgaria	3–7	Turkey
Zhylchuk 12'32"; Petev 16'26", 31'52"	Report	Umur Ağır 1'07", 16'59" (pen.), 29'17"; Gökdeniz Kahveci 18'29", 25'28", 33'15"; Bulbul 28'40"

LSC Druskininkai Hall, Druskininkai
Referee: Martin Køster (Denmark), Danilo Francalanza (Malta)
12 April 2026
16:00

Lithuania	0–1	North Macedonia
	Report	B. Janev 13'09"

LSC Druskininkai Hall, Druskininkai
Referee: Petar Radojcic (Serbia), Oliver Rodriguez-Ballinger (England)

=== Group D ===
Pos	Team	Pld	W	D	L	GF	GA	GD	Pts	Qualification
1	Kosovo	3	2	1	0	20	6	+14	7	Main round
2	Montenegro (H)	3	2	1	0	12	5	+7	7	Main round
3	Austria	3	1	0	2	12	9	+3	3	
4	Gibraltar	3	0	0	3	0	24	−24	0	

Source: UEFA
Rules for classification: Tiebreakers
(H) Hosts
9 April 2026
16:30

Kosovo	11–0	Gibraltar
Maxharraj 3'11", 16'55", 22'48", 33'30"; Mazreku 8'50"; Alaj 12'13"; Haxhijaj 13'59"; Imeri 14'13"; Kameri 16'42", 35'19"; Parker 36'10" (o.g.)	Report

Sportski Centar, Igalo
Attendance: 20
Referee: Dag Erik Tangvik (Norway), Jonas Rossen (Denmark)
9 April 2026
19:30

Austria	2–3	Montenegro
Gager 4'27"; Vukovic 12'04"	Report	Il. Mugoša 3'13"; Vukčević 4'45", 11'14"

Sportski Centar, Igalo
Attendance: 80
Referee: Stephen Vella (Malta), Vedran Marcinko (Bosnia and Herzegovina)

10 April 2026
16:30

Austria	3–6	Kosovo
Gustavo 16'30", 36'17"; Flögel 22'53"	Report	Kameri 11'00"; Alaj 19'28", 23'26", 32'25", 37'02"; Imeri 28'37"

Sportski Centar, Igalo
Attendance: 50
Referee: Vedran Marcinko (Bosnia and Herzegovina), Dag Erik Tangvik (Norway)
10 April 2026
19:30

Montenegro	6–0	Gibraltar
Vuletić 1'17"; Il. Mugoša 11'18"; Nikolić 20'41", 22'06", 31'13"; Vukčević 35'13"	Report

Sportski Centar, Igalo
Attendance: 50
Referee: Jonas Rossen (Denmark), Stephen Vella (Malta)

12 April 2026
16:30

Gibraltar	0–7	Austria
	Report	Rajkovic 4'17"; Gustavo 5'22" Rodriguez 8'30" (o.g.) Muharemovic 10'47" Flögel 14'20", 23'42" Perez 31'44" (o.g.)

Sportski Centar, Igalo
Attendance: 10
Referee: Stephen Vella (Malta), Vedran Marcinko (Bosnia and Herzegovina)
12 April 2026
19:30

Montenegro	3–3	Kosovo
Xhinovci 10'17" (o.g.); Vukčević 22'47"; Marković 29'18"	Report	Maxharraj 6'21"; Imeri 11'44"; Haxhijaj 39'42"

Sportski Centar, Igalo
Attendance: 90
Referee: Jonas Rossen (Denmark), Dag Erik Tangvik (Norway)

=== Group E ===
Pos	Team	Pld	W	D	L	GF	GA	GD	Pts	Qualification
1	Latvia	3	3	0	0	23	3	+20	9	Main round
2	Albania (H)	3	1	1	1	6	6	0	4	Main round
3	Cyprus	3	1	1	1	6	15	−9	4	
4	San Marino	3	0	0	3	2	13	−11	0	

Source: UEFA
Rules for classification: Tiebreakers
(H) Hosts
9 April 2026
13:00

Latvia	8–0	San Marino
Kuļepovs 0'45"; Kozlovskis 7'00", 15'01"; Tarakanovs 12'16"; Mik. Babris 15'47", 23'11"; Mickēvičs 21'47" (o.g.); Baklanovs 28'06"	Report

Tirana Olympic Park, Tirana
Attendance: 25
Referee: Mariia Myslovska (Ukraine), Antonios Adamopoulos (Greece)
9 April 2026
19:00

Cyprus	2–2	Albania
Chadjigeorgiou 6'46"; Kouloumbris 13'14"	Report	Selmanaj 0'37"; Tafa 14'57"

Tirana Olympic Park, Tirana
Attendance: 100
Referee: Daniel Matkovic (Switzerland), Nurlybek Kalimaganbetov (Kazakhstan)

10 April 2026
13:00

Cyprus	1–12	Latvia
Koulloupas 17'45"	Report	Mickēvičs 4'34"; Ūdris 9'29", 39'04"; Tarakanovs 10'04", 22'47"; Baklanovs 12'16", 20'26"; Motiļs 17'14"; Kuļepovs 20'36"; Kozlovskis 25'30"; Rimkus 31'46"; Stylianou 33'59" (o.g.)

Tirana Olympic Park, Tirana
Attendance: 10
Referee: Nurlybek Kalimaganbetov (Kazakhstan), Mariia Myslovska (Ukraine)
10 April 2026
19:00

Albania	2–1	San Marino
Shkodra 2'55"; Selmanaj 19'11"	Report	Chezzi 31'28"

Tirana Olympic Park, Tirana
Attendance: 70
Referee: Antonios Adamopoulos (Greece), Daniel Matkovic (Switzerland)

12 April 2026
15:00

San Marino	1–3	Cyprus
Verri 12'39"	Report	Tsitsos 6'24"; Savva 34'18", 38'44"

Tirana Olympic Park, Tirana
Attendance: 20
Referee: Mariia Myslovska (Ukraine), Nurlybek Kalimaganbetov (Kazakhstan)
12 April 2026
20:30

Albania	2–3	Latvia
Limani 1'36", 31'11"	Report	Baklanovs 2'33"; Mik. Babris 11'50"; Rimkus 16'04"

Tirana Olympic Park, Tirana
Attendance: 100
Referee: Daniel Matkovic (Switzerland), Antonios Adamopoulos (Greece)

=== Group F ===
Pos	Team	Pld	W	D	L	GF	GA	GD	Pts	Qualification
1	Norway	3	2	1	0	8	4	+4	7	Main round
2	Estonia (H)	3	1	2	0	8	7	+1	5	Main round
3	Israel	3	1	1	1	10	11	−1	4	
4	Greece	3	0	0	3	7	11	−4	0	

Source: UEFA
Rules for classification: Tiebreakers
(H) Hosts
11 April 2026
12:00

Greece	2–4	Israel
Anastasopoulos 4'39"; Ntatis 20'25"	Report	Taha 13'28"; T. Shkolnik 31'35", 39'30"; Itzhak Halevy 31'54"

Jõhvi Spordihall, Jõhvi
Attendance: 67
Referee: Daniel Stauber (Austria), Daniele D'adamo (San Marino)
11 April 2026
18:00

Norway	0–0	Estonia
	Report

Jõhvi Spordihall, Jõhvi
Attendance: 353
Referee: Radim Cep (Czech Republic), Peter Budac (Slovakia)

12 April 2026
12:00

Norway	3–2	Greece
Holter 3'26"; Andreassen 8'39"; Ajer 34'01"	Report	Gousis 9'50"; Adam 34'53"

Jõhvi Spordihall, Jõhvi
Attendance: 44
Referee: Peter Budac (Slovakia), Daniel Stauber (Austria)
12 April 2026
18:00

Estonia	4–4	Israel
Rebane 14'45"; Vnukov 29'39", 30'11"; Savikink 39'25"	Report	Itzhak Halevy 13'23", 38'57"; Bar-El 27'03"; Ben Aharon 36'11"

Jõhvi Spordihall, Jõhvi
Attendance: 352
Referee: Daniele D'adamo (San Marino), Radim Cep (Czech Republic)

14 April 2026
12:00

Israel	2–5	Norway
Itzhak Halevy 12'42"; Dayan 37'10"	Report	Lind 5'28"; Andreassen 21'35"; Welo 25'19"; M. Johansen 26'27"; Ajer 39'15"

Jõhvi Spordihall, Jõhvi
Referee: Radim Cep (Czech Republic), Peter Budac (Slovakia)
14 April 2026
18:00

Estonia	4–3	Greece
Matinaro 14'39"; Vnukov 20'47", 25'39"; Männi 37'00"	Report	Ntatis 9'31", 23'22"; Anastasopoulos 37'30"

Jõhvi Spordihall, Jõhvi
Referee: Daniele D'adamo (San Marino), Daniel Stauber (Austria)

== Main round ==
The winners and four best runners-up will advance to the elite round. The remaining eight runners-up enter main round play-offs. The matches of the main round must be completed by 3 March 2027.

The draw for the main round will be held on 19 June 2026 at 12:00 CET.

Teams that received a bye to this round

- Portugal
- Spain
- Kazakhstan
- Ukraine
- France
- Croatia
- Italy
- Slovenia
- Czech Republic
- Poland
- Netherlands
- Armenia
- Georgia
- Belarus
- Slovakia
- Finland
- Belgium
- Serbia
- Hungary
- Romania
- Bosnia and Herzegovina
- Moldova
- Germany
- Azerbaijan

Teams qualified from the preliminary round

Group	Winners	Runners-up
A	Andorra	Denmark
B	Sweden	Northern Ireland
C	North Macedonia	Lithuania
D	Kosovo	Montenegro
E	Latvia	Albania
F	Norway	Estonia

=== Group 1 ===
Pos	Team	Pld	W	D	L	GF	GA	GD	Pts	Qualification
1	Hungary	2	2	0	0	6	3	+3	6	Elite round
2	Armenia	2	0	1	1	6	7	−1	1	Elite round or Main round play-offs based on rankings
3	Sweden	2	0	1	1	5	7	−2	1	

Updated to match(es) played on 7 November 2026. Source: UEFA
Rules for classification: Tiebreakers
15 October 2026
18:00

Hungary	3–1	Sweden
Kajtár 10'02"; Rutai 18'32"; Szalmás 23'26"	Report	Smajlovic 00'55"

Continental Arena, Nyiregyhaza
Referee: Grigori Ošomkov (Estonia), Jagnar Jakobson (Estonia)

20 October 2026
17:00

Armenia	2–3	Hungary
Petrosov 10'57"; Margaryan 26'08"	Report	Szabó 21'44", 24'39"; Dermenjyan 22'27" (o.g.)

FFA Technical Center Academy, Yerevan
Referee: Daniel Matkovic (Switzerland), David Schaerli (Switzerland)

7 November 2026
15:00

Sweden	4–4	Armenia
Sääf 00'38"; Smajlovic 13'18" (pen.); Kadivar 14'12"; Edh 19'56"	Report	Mashumyan 24'04", 28'08"; Dermenjyan 28'40" (pen.); Gandilyan 33'24"

Gavlehovshallen, Gävle
Referee: Jan Kresta (Czech Republic), Radim Cep (Czech Republic)

9 December 2026
16:00

Armenia	v	Sweden
	Report

FFA Technical Center Academy, Yerevan

27 February 2027
13:00

Sweden	v	Hungary
	Report

Gavlehovshallen, Gävle

3 March 2027

Hungary	v	Armenia
	Report

=== Group 2 ===
Pos	Team	Pld	W	D	L	GF	GA	GD	Pts	Qualification
1	France (Q)	3	3	0	0	12	1	+11	9	Elite round
2	Montenegro	3	1	0	2	7	7	0	3	Elite round or Main round play-offs based on rankings
3	Moldova	2	0	0	2	1	12	−11	0	

Updated to match(es) played on 10 November 2026. Source: UEFA
Rules for classification: Tiebreakers
(Q) Qualified for the phase indicated
16 October 2026
18:00

Montenegro	6–1	Moldova
Puletić 00'39"; Marković 07'13"; Cimbaljević 11'13"; Vuletić 19'08"; Nikolić 31'16", 39'54"	Report	Coval 39'29"

Verde Complex, Podgorica
Referee: George Jansizian (Sweden), Kastriot Gerxhaliu (Sweden)

20 October 2026
18:30

Moldova	0–6	France
	Report	Lutin 04'42"; Guirio 14'03"; Rezzoug 18'47"; Diaoune 19'22"; Tchaptchet 29'50"; Saadaoui 36'21"

FMF Futsal Arena, Chișinău
Referee: Ugur Cakmak (Turkey), Hakan Tezcan (Turkey)

6 November 2026
20:00

France	4–1	Montenegro
Guirio 10'25"; Mohamed Adam 15'22"; Diaoune 17'34"; Mouhoudine 22'01"	Report	Puletić 32'17"

Antarès Arena, Le Mans
Referee: Besart Ismajli (Kosovo), Besar Beqiri (Kosovo)

10 November 2026
18:00

Montenegro	0–2	France
	Report	Mohammed 17'43"; Tchaptchet 35'14"

Sportski Centar Igalo, Igalo
Referee: Pablo Delgado Sastre (Spain), Diego Martinez Garcia (Spain)

9 December 2026

France	v	Moldova
	Report

Arena du Pays d'Aix, Aix-en-Provence

28 February 2027

Moldova	v	Montenegro
	Report

=== Group 3 ===
Pos	Team	Pld	W	D	L	GF	GA	GD	Pts	Qualification
1	Croatia	2	2	0	0	6	3	+3	6	Elite round
2	Germany	2	1	0	1	6	5	+1	3	Elite round or Main round play-offs based on rankings
3	Lithuania	2	0	0	2	3	7	−4	0	

Updated to match(es) played on 10 November 2026. Source: UEFA
Rules for classification: Tiebreakers
18 October 2026
18:00

Germany	4–2	Lithuania
Block 06'45", 39'13"; Wittig 20'43", 29'43"	Report	Reimaris 08'08"; Zagurskas 10'44"

Westenergie Sporthalle, Mülheim
Referee: Paavo Komppa (Finland), Kirill Naishouler (Finland)

6 November 2026
20:30

Croatia	3–2	Germany
Vukmir 07'10"; Lima 12'44"; Kuraja 17'08"	Report	Oliveira 14'37"; Herterich 30'05"

Sportska Dvorana Zamet, Rijeka
Referee: Mariia Myslovska (Ukraine), Andrii Kuzmin (Ukraine)

10 November 2026
18:00

Lithuania	1–3	Croatia
Osauskas 27'45"	Report	Lima 02'51"; Mataja 21'27"; Jurlina 32'13"

Jonava Arena, Jonava
Referee: George Jansizian (Sweden), Ademir Avdic (Sweden)

9 December 2026
19:00

Croatia	v	Lithuania
	Report

Dvorana Gradski VRT, Osijek

27 February 2027

Lithuania	v	Germany
	Report

3 March 2027

Germany	v	Croatia
	Report

=== Group 4 ===
Pos	Team	Pld	W	D	L	GF	GA	GD	Pts	Qualification
1	Spain	1	1	0	0	3	1	+2	3	Elite round
2	Finland	2	1	0	1	7	4	+3	3	Elite round or Main round play-offs based on rankings
3	North Macedonia	1	0	0	1	1	6	−5	0	

Updated to match(es) played on 10 November 2026. Source: UEFA
Rules for classification: Tiebreakers
20 October 2026
20:30

Spain	3–1	Finland
Pablo 10'50"; Mayor 30'37"; Pérez 36'58"	Report	Sylla 27'20"

Manzanares Arena, Manzanares
Referee: Julien Lang (France), Victor Chaix (France)

10 November 2026
17:30

Finland	6–1	North Macedonia
Lintula 02'17", 36'45"; Korsunov 14'26"; Ahmadi 20'47"; Pirttijoki 23'19"; Koivumäki 35'38"	Report	Janev 04'20"

Energia Areena, Vantaa
Referee: Petar Radojcic (Serbia), Srdjan Mihajlovic (Serbia)

8 December 2026
19:00

North Macedonia	v	Spain
	Report

Sportska Sala, Kumanovo

23 February 2027

Spain	v	North Macedonia
	Report

27 February 2027

North Macedonia	v	Finland
	Report

2 March 2027

Finland	v	Spain
	Report

=== Group 5 ===
Pos	Team	Pld	W	D	L	GF	GA	GD	Pts	Qualification
1	Poland	3	3	0	0	30	3	+27	9	Elite round
2	Bosnia and Herzegovina	2	1	0	1	19	7	+12	3	Elite round or Main round play-offs based on rankings
3	Northern Ireland	3	0	0	3	3	41	−38	0	

Updated to match(es) played on 11 November 2026. Source: UEFA
Rules for classification: Tiebreakers
15 October 2026
19:00

Bosnia and Herzegovina	17–1	Northern Ireland
Kadić 02'22", 18'54"; Brkanić 05'26", 15'01", 32'36", 39'13"; Ibrisimović 05'57", 22'01"; Gosto 07'51"; Živković 13'08"; Baručija 18'16", 24'10"; Bundavica 31'19"; Pejičić 33'31"; Milanović 34'19"; Todorić 36'57"; Demirović 37'24"	Report	Dobney 19'32"

City Arena Husejin Smajlovic, Zenica
Referee: Nicola Manzione (Italy), Giulio Colombin (Italy)

21 October 2026
18:00

Poland	6–2	Bosnia and Herzegovina
Zastawnik 11'09", 30'20"; Sendlewski 18'29"; Góes 20'20", 34'07"; Raszkowski 25'05"	Report	Živković 12'49"; Bundavica 15'59"

Arena Gorzów, Gorzów
Referee: Rúben Santos (Portugal), Cristiano Santos (Portugal)

7 November 2026
19:00

Poland	12–1	Northern Ireland
Kriezel 03'10", 31'10", 37'17"; Pawlus 03'20", 10'49"; Zastawnik 05'22", 18'20"; Góes 06'51"; Solzi 24'34"; Leszczak 33'45", 37'08" (pen.); Sendlewski 36'38"	Report	Barr 26'51"

Arena Jaskółka Tarnów, Tarnów
Referee: Lukáš Peško (Slovakia), Rastislav Behancin (Slovakia)

11 November 2026
19:00

Northern Ireland	1–12	Poland
McMenemy 31'43"	Report	Kriezel 01'00"; Zastawnik 01'28", 03'41", 27'19"; Roohi 06'50" (o.g.); Sendlewski 07'09"; Barr 24'35" (o.g.); Kaniewski 28'38", 30'08", 38'30"; Iwanek 31'24"; Siecla 39'37"

Newforge Sports Complex, Belfast
Referee: Lars van Leeuwen (Netherlands), Jacob Willem Machiel Van Dijke (Netherlands)

25 February 2027

Northern Ireland	v	Bosnia and Herzegovina
	Report

3 March 2027

Bosnia and Herzegovina	v	Poland
	Report

=== Group 6 ===
- The Belarus home matches are played on neutral ground in Humenné, Slovakia, due to the Russian invasion of Ukraine.

Pos	Team	Pld	W	D	L	GF	GA	GD	Pts	Qualification
1	Belarus	3	2	0	1	17	8	+9	6	Elite round
2	Kazakhstan	2	1	0	1	6	9	−3	3	Elite round or Main round play-offs based on rankings
3	Albania	1	0	0	1	2	8	−6	0	

Updated to match(es) played on 10 November 2026. Source: UEFA
Rules for classification: Tiebreakers
20 October 2026
17:00

Kazakhstan	5–4	Belarus
Akbalikov 08'54" (pen.); Edson 09'19", 13'30", 27'42"; Higuita 33'07"	Report	Krykun 03'40", 39'48"; Baturin 30'53"; Shvedko 39'14"

Jekpe-Jek Hall, Astana
Referee: Ondřej Černý (Czech Republic), Radim Cep (Czech Republic)

6 November 2026
15:30

Belarus	8–2	Albania
Dubkov 03'59"; Baturin 06'58"; Shadurka 08'59"; Shvedko 09'43", 17'09"; Krykun 10'18"; Semianiuk 13'34"; Sinitski 35'08"	Report	Tafa 16'47"; Limani 32'43"

Sport Hall Humenné, Humenne (Slovakia)
Referee: Done Ristovski (North Macedonia), Martin Køster (Denmark)

10 November 2026
20:00

Belarus	5–1	Kazakhstan
Selyuk 06'46"; Pinchuk 09'24"; Shadurka 12'40"; Krykun 28'06"; Sinitski 39'37"	Report	Turegazin 39'46"

Sport Hall Humenné, Humenne (Slovakia)
Referee: Cristiano Santos (Portugal), Rúben Santos (Portugal)

9 December 2026
16:00

Kazakhstan	v	Albania
	Report

Baluan Sholak Sports Palace, Almaty

26 February 2027

Albania	v	Belarus
	Report

2 March 2027

Albania	v	Kazakhstan
	Report

=== Group 7 ===
Pos	Team	Pld	W	D	L	GF	GA	GD	Pts	Qualification
1	Portugal	2	2	0	0	16	4	+12	6	Elite round
2	Romania	2	1	0	1	3	7	−4	3	Elite round or Main round play-offs based on rankings
3	Denmark	2	0	0	2	4	12	−8	0	

Updated to match(es) played on 8 November 2026. Source: UEFA
Rules for classification: Tiebreakers
16 October 2026
21:00

Portugal	10–3	Denmark
Paçó 03'03", 28'29"; Santos 03'47", 15'51"; Neves 09'55" (pen.); Lúcio Jr 14'43", 37'21"; Teixeira 19'37", 32'10"; Coelho 32'46"	Report	Youssef 00'28"; Gantzhorn 10'43"; Rasmussen 15'33"

Pavilhão Multiusos Odivelas, Odivelas
Referee: Petar Radojcic (Serbia), Nikola Rabrenović (Serbia)

21 October 2026
18:00

Romania	1–6	Portugal
Iszlai 01'13"	Report	Paçó 00'15", 18'20"; Varela 02'56"; Góis 17'18"; Jesus 31'59"; Neves 38'44"

City Hall Arena, Targu Mures
Referee: Besar Beqiri (Kosovo), Besart Ismajli (Kosovo)

8 November 2026
17:30

Romania	2–1	Denmark
Crăciun 07'38"; Marin 09'11"	Report	El-Ouaz 38'15"

Sepsi Arena, Sfantu Gheorghe
Referee: Hakan Tezcan (Turkey), Ugur Cakmak (Turkey)

9 December 2026

Denmark	v	Portugal
	Report

Broager Sparekasse Skansen, Sonderborg

28 February 2027

Denmark	v	Romania
	Report

3 March 2027

Portugal	v	Romania
	Report

=== Group 8 ===
Pos	Team	Pld	W	D	L	GF	GA	GD	Pts	Qualification
1	Netherlands	3	1	2	0	10	6	+4	5	Elite round
2	Serbia	2	1	1	0	7	3	+4	4	Elite round or Main round play-offs based on rankings
3	Andorra	3	0	1	2	3	11	−8	1	

Updated to match(es) played on 11 November 2026. Source: UEFA
Rules for classification: Tiebreakers
16 October 2026
18:00

Serbia	4–0	Andorra
Petrov 13'24"; Tomić 18'01"; Marinković (19'29"); Aleksić (25'28")	Report

Sports Hall Požarevac, Požarevac
Referee: Dominykas Norkus (Lithuania), Irmantas Kaprašovas (Lithuania)

21 October 2026
19:30

Netherlands	3–3	Serbia
van der Wal 34'11"; Ceyar 35'48", 39'12"	Report	Tomić 16'52"; Petrov 31'22", 32'21"

Maaspoort, 's-Hertogenbosch
Referee: Nikola Jelić (Croatia), Dino Kramar (Croatia)

6 November 2026
20:00

Andorra	1–5	Netherlands
Blat 33'49"	Report	Boukhari 10'59", 19'39"; Chih 11'36", 17'02"; Ceyar 39'44"

Poliesportiu d'Andorra, Andorra la Vella
Referee: Daniel Matkovic (Switzerland), Darko Boskovic (Switzerland)

11 November 2026
19:30

Netherlands	2–2	Andorra
Boukhari 20'12", 38'15"	Report	Regalo 17'02"; Rodriguez 21'24"

Topsportcentrum Rotterdam, Rotterdam
Referee: Grigori Ošomkov (Estonia), Viktor Bugenko (Moldova)

26 February 2027

Andorra	v	Serbia
	Report

3 March 2027

Serbia	v	Netherlands
	Report

=== Group 9 ===
Pos	Team	Pld	W	D	L	GF	GA	GD	Pts	Qualification
1	Ukraine	2	2	0	0	11	3	+8	6	Elite round
2	Slovakia	2	1	0	1	5	3	+2	3	Elite round or Main round play-offs based on rankings
3	Estonia	2	0	0	2	3	13	−10	0	

Updated to match(es) played on 10 November 2026. Source: UEFA
Rules for classification: Tiebreakers
15 October 2026
18:00

Slovakia	4–1	Estonia
Zaťovič 02'52"; Ševčík 03'52"; Drahovský 04'40", 16'10"	Report	Stüf 16'44"

Športová hala Arena, Lučenec
Referee: Dag Erik Tangvik (Norway), Telmen Undrakh (Norway)

20 October 2026
18:00

Estonia	2–9	Ukraine
Vnukov 01'53"; Shved 12'15" (o.g.)	Report	Abakshyn 00'34", 12'05", 17'24"; Mykytiuk 09'43", 14'34"; Semenchenko 10'55"; Cherniavskyi 19'56"; Danyliuk 25'13"; Prykhodko 31'14"

Rakvere Spordikeskus, Rakvere
Referee: Pablo Delgado Sastre (Spain), Javier Moreno Reina (Spain)

10 November 2026
18:00

Slovakia	1–2	Ukraine
Drahovský 39'10"	Report	Mykytiuk 18'31"; Semenchenko 33'53"

Gopass Arena, Bratislava
Referee: Aleš Močnik Perič (Slovenia), Dejan Veselič (Slovenia)

9 December 2026
18:00

Estonia	v	Slovakia
	Report

Jõhvi Spordihall, Johvi

26 February 2027

Ukraine	v	Estonia
	Report

2 March 2027

Ukraine	v	Slovakia
	Report

=== Group 10 ===
Pos	Team	Pld	W	D	L	GF	GA	GD	Pts	Qualification
1	Italy (Q)	3	3	0	0	10	5	+5	9	Elite round
2	Kosovo	3	1	0	2	6	9	−3	3	Elite round or Main round play-offs based on rankings
3	Georgia	2	0	0	2	4	6	−2	0	

Updated to match(es) played on 10 November 2026. Source: UEFA
Rules for classification: Tiebreakers
(Q) Qualified for the phase indicated
14 October 2026
17:00

Georgia	2–3	Kosovo
Chimakadze 03'11"; Svanidze 19'08"	Report	Rukovci 32'53"; Maxharraj 36'17"; Dervishaj 39'09"

Olympic Palace, Tbilisi
Referee: Damian Grabowski (Poland), Dominik Cipinski (Poland)

20 October 2026
20:30

Italy	3–2	Georgia
Pulvirenti 11'51"; Tkeshelashvili 19'07"; Motta 21'21"	Report	Giorgaia 16'57"; Kekelia 30'34"

PalaPirossigeno, Rende
Referee: Yiangos Yiangou (Cyprus), Nicolas Nicolaou (Cyprus)

6 November 2026
20:00

Kosovo	3–4	Italy
Alaj 26'48", 32'34"; Krasniqi 29'11"	Report	Podda 07'32"; Pulvirenti 15'56"; C. Musumeci 23'53"; Fortini 36'42"

Pallati i Rinise, Pristina
Referee: Bogdan Hanceariuc (Romania), Laurentiu Deaconu (Romania)

10 November 2026
20:00

Italy	3–0	Kosovo
Motta 14'23"; Molaro 16'10"; Silvestri 39'30"	Report

PalaDisfida, Barletta
Referee: Dominykas Norkus (Lithuania), Irmantas Kaprašovas (Lithuania)

24 February 2027

Kosovo	v	Georgia
	Report

2 March 2027

Georgia	v	Italy
	Report

=== Group 11 ===
Pos	Team	Pld	W	D	L	GF	GA	GD	Pts	Qualification
1	Belgium (Q)	3	2	1	0	12	7	+5	7	Elite round
2	Slovenia	3	1	1	1	11	9	+2	4	Elite round or Main round play-offs based on rankings
3	Norway	2	0	0	2	4	11	−7	0	

Updated to match(es) played on 10 November 2026. Source: UEFA
Rules for classification: Tiebreakers
(Q) Qualified for the phase indicated
16 October 2026
18:30

Norway	3–4	Belgium
I. Johansen 00'48", 20'37"; Welo 39'26"	Report	Lagrib 02'27", 20'24"; Ghislandi 12'06"; Aabbou 31'36"

Nordstrand Arena, Oslo
Referee: Denys Kutsyi (Ukraine), Orest Dutsiak (Ukraine)

21 October 2026
20:00

Belgium	2–2	Slovenia
Vaelen 06'45"; Ghislandi 18'28"	Report	Tušar 10'51"; Čop 37'48"

Lotto Arena, Antwerp
Referee: Viktor Bugenko (Moldova), Lars van Leeuwen (Netherlands)

6 November 2026
18:00

Slovenia	7–1	Norway
Bukovec 06'15"; Rems 08'21", 39'02"; Čop 17'50", 21'12"; Turk 18'53"; Røttingsnes 36'12" (o.g.)	Report	Løkken 17'05"

Tivoli Hall, Ljubljana
Referee: Ingus Puriņš (Latvia), Ivan Ivanov (Bulgaria)

10 November 2026
17:30

Slovenia	2–6	Belgium
Turk 21'36"; Čeh 29'29" (pen.)	Report	Dillien 10'08", 38'15"; Hachad 10'24", 37'05"; Lagrib 14'05"; Mbazoa 24'57"

Tivoli Hall, Ljubljana
Referee: Damian Grabowski (Poland), Barbara Mrozek (Poland)

27 February 2027
18:00

Norway	v	Slovenia
	Report

Altahallen, Alta

2 March 2027

Belgium	v	Norway
	Report

=== Group 12 ===
Pos	Team	Pld	W	D	L	GF	GA	GD	Pts	Qualification
1	Czech Republic (Y)	3	1	2	0	7	6	+1	5	Elite round
2	Latvia	2	1	1	0	8	4	+4	4	Elite round or Main round play-offs based on rankings
3	Azerbaijan	3	0	1	2	4	9	−5	1	

Updated to match(es) played on 8 November 2026. Source: UEFA
Rules for classification: Tiebreakers
(Y) Assured of at least the Main round play-offs
16 October 2026
20:00

Czech Republic	2–1	Azerbaijan
Seidler 04'06"; Zápotocký 19'55"	Report	Aliyev 33'44"

Hala Polárka, Frydek-Mistek
Referee: Peter Nurse (England), Valentin Ciuplea (Wales)

20 October 2026
18:30

Czech Republic	3–3	Latvia
Seidler 21'47"; Künstner 27'16", 31'11"	Report	Mickēvičs 19'58"; Ūdris 21'14", 32'52"

Hala Opava, Opava
Referee: Dejan Veselič (Slovenia), Aleš Močnik Perič (Slovenia)

5 November 2026
14:00

Azerbaijan	2–2	Czech Republic
Manafov 11'51"; Aliyev 36'13"	Report	Seidler 21'51"; Alakbarov 25'47" (o.g.)

Lankaran Olympic Sport Complex, Lankaran
Referee: Chiara Perona (Italy), Martina Piccolo (Italy)

8 November 2026
20:00

Azerbaijan	1–5	Latvia
Ismayilov 36'02"	Report	Ūdris 01'51", 08'04"; Tarakanovs 06'47"; Baklanovs 10'46"; Babris 26'58"

Baku Sports Hall, Baku
Referee: Dino Kramar (Croatia), Nikola Jelić (Croatia)

27 February 2027

Latvia	v	Azerbaijan
	Report

3 March 2027

Latvia	v	Czech Republic
	Report

=== Ranking of second-placed teams ===
Pos	Grp	Team	Pld	W	D	L	GF	GA	GD	Pts	Qualification
1	12	Latvia	2	1	1	0	8	4	+4	4	Elite round
2	8	Serbia	2	1	1	0	7	3	+4	4	Elite round
3	11	Slovenia	3	1	1	1	11	9	+2	4	Elite round
4	5	Bosnia and Herzegovina	2	1	0	1	19	7	+12	3	Elite round
5	4	Finland	2	1	0	1	7	4	+3	3	Main round play-offs
6	9	Slovakia	2	1	0	1	5	3	+2	3	Main round play-offs
7	3	Germany	2	1	0	1	6	5	+1	3	Main round play-offs
8	2	Montenegro	3	1	0	2	7	7	0	3	Main round play-offs
9	10	Kosovo	3	1	0	2	6	9	−3	3	Main round play-offs
10	6	Kazakhstan	2	1	0	1	6	9	−3	3	Main round play-offs
11	7	Romania	2	1	0	1	3	7	−4	3	Main round play-offs
12	1	Armenia	2	0	1	1	6	7	−1	1	Main round play-offs

Updated to match(es) played on 11 November 2026. Source: UEFA
Rules for classification: 1) points; 2) goal difference; 3) goals scored; 4) away goals scored; 5) wins; 6) away wins; 7) disciplinary points; 8) coefficient ranking.

== Main round play-offs ==
The winner of each tie will advance to the Elite round. The matches will be played from 12 to 21 April 2027.

The draw for the main round play-offs will be held on 5 March 2027.

Team 1	Agg.	Team 2	1st leg	2nd leg

Times are CET (UTC+1), as listed by UEFA (local times, if different, are in parentheses).

== Elite round ==
The draw for the elite round will be held on 20 May 2027, with matches to be completed by 22 December 2027. The five group winners qualify to the 2028 FIFA Futsal World Cup. The four best runners-up enter the elite round play-offs.

Teams qualified from the main round and the main round play-offs

Group	Winners	Four best runners-up	Play-off winners
1			
2	France		
3			
4			
5			
6			
7			
8			
9			
10	Italy		
11	Belgium		
12			
