= 2017 Nordic Futsal Cup =

Tournament details
- Host country: Norway
- Dates: 5 december–9 December 2017
- Teams: 6 (from 1 confederation)
- Venue(s): 1 (in 1 host city)

Final positions
- Champions: Finland (3rd title)
- Runners-up: Denmark
- Third place: Norway
- Fourth place: Sweden

Tournament statistics
- Matches played: 10
- Goals scored: 53 (5.3 per match)

The 2017 Nordic Futsal Cup was played in Norway from 28 November to 3 December 2017.

== Standings ==
Team	Pld	W	D	L	GF	GA	GD	Pts
Finland	4	4	0	0	17	6	+11	12
Denmark	4	2	1	1	10	9	+1	7
Norway	4	1	1	2	7	8	−1	4
Sweden	4	1	0	3	10	16	−6	3
Greenland	4	0	2	2	9	14	−5	2

Source: Svenskfotboll.se

== Matches ==
5 December 2017
16:00

Finland	6–1	Sweden

Arena Stjørdal, Stjørdal
5 December 2017
19:00

Denmark	1–0	Norway

Arena Stjørdal, Stjørdal

6 December 2017
16:00

Denmark	4–3	Sweden

Arena Stjørdal, Stjørdal
6 December 2017
19:00

Finland	4–1	Greenland

Arena Stjørdal, Stjørdal

7 December 2017
16:00

Norway	1–3	Finland

Arena Stjørdal, Stjørdal
7 December 2017
19:00

Sweden	5–3	Greenland

Arena Stjørdal, Stjørdal

8 December 2017
16:00

Denmark	2–2	Greenland

Arena Stjørdal, Stjørdal
8 December 2017
19:00

Norway	3–1	Sweden

Arena Stjørdal, Stjørdal

9 December 2017
13:00

Finland	4–3	Denmark

Arena Stjørdal, Stjørdal
9 December 2017
16:00

Norway	3–3	Greenland

Arena Stjørdal, Stjørdal
