= Nordic Futsal Cup =

- Founded: 2013
- Region: Nordic countries (UEFA)
- Teams: 4–5
- Current champions: Sweden
- Most championships: Finland (5 titles)
- 2022 Nordic Futsal Cup

The Nordic Futsal Cup is the Nordic countries futsal Championship competition hosted by UEFA.

== History ==
The Nordic Futsal Cup had its inauguration edition in 2013 in the Danish city of Nykøbing Falster. Denmark, Finland, Norway and Sweden participated. In 2016, Greenland made its debut in the tournament.

In 2023 a joint Nordic Futsal Cup and Baltic Futsal Cup tournament was held, called Baltic–Nordic Futsal Cup.

== Summary ==
Year	Host	Winner	Runner-up	Third place	Fourth place	Fifth place	Sixth place
2013	Denmark (Nykøbing Falster)	Sweden	Norway	Finland	Denmark	—	—
2014	Finland (Hyvinkää/Tampere)	Finland	Norway	Sweden	Denmark	—	—
2016	Sweden (Jönköping/Skövde)	Finland	Sweden	Denmark	Norway	Greenland	—
2017	Norway (Trondheim)	Finland	Denmark	Norway	Sweden	Greenland	—
2018	Denmark (Ringkøbing)	Finland	Sweden	Denmark	Norway	Greenland	—
2019	Finland (Turku)	Finland	Norway	Sweden	Greenland	Denmark	—
2020	Sweden	cancelled because of COVID-19 pandemic					
2021	Sweden (Karlskrona)	Norway	Sweden	Denmark	Greenland	—	—
2022	Norway (Sandefjord)	Sweden	Norway	Denmark	Germany	—	—
2023 (Note: Baltic–Nordic Futsal Cup)	Denmark (Hjørring)	Denmark	Latvia	Norway	Lithuania	Estonia	Greenland
2024							

=== Medal table ===
Rank	Nation	Gold	Silver	Bronze	Total
1	Finland	5	0	1	6
2	Norway	1	3	1	5
3	Sweden	1	2	2	5
4	Denmark	0	1	2	3
Totals (4 entries)		7	6	6	19

=== General statistics ===
Team	Pld	W	D	L	GF	GA	GD	Pts
Finland	22	19	1	2	92	32	+60	58
Sweden	25	11	4	10	83	75	+8	37
Norway	25	10	3	12	57	64	−7	33
Denmark	25	8	5	12	71	84	−13	29
Greenland	19	2	3	14	41	99	−58	9
