= Damir Pertič =

Slovenian futsal player

Personal information
- Date of birth: 10 July 1981 (age 45)
- Position: Winger

Senior career*
Years	Team	Apps	(Gls)
- Litija

International career
2007–2012	Slovenia	44	(21)
- * Club domestic league appearances and goals

Damir Pertič (born 10 July 1981) is a retired Slovenian futsal player.
