= Switzerland national futsal team =

- Nickname(s): Schweizer Nati, La Nati, Rossocrociati
- Association: Swiss Football Association
- Confederation: UEFA (Europe)
- Head coach: (Croatia) Mico Martić
- Asst coach: Dusan Matic & Hrvoje Penava
- Captain: Evangelos Marcoyannakis
- Most caps: Evangelos Marcoyannakis [67 caps]
- Top scorer: Evangelos Marcoyannakis [30 goals]
- FIFA code: SUI
- FIFA ranking: 120 (24 September 2026)
Home colours	Away colours

First international
- Switzerland 6–4 Malta (Biel, Switzerland; 15 December 2009)

Biggest win
- Switzerland 13–0 Gibraltar (Siggenthal, Switzerland; 20 January 2017)

Biggest defeat
- Spain 14–0 Switzerland (Las Rozas de Madrid, Spain; 12 April 2021)

FIFA World Cup
- Appearances: 0

UEFA Futsal Championship
- Appearances: 0

The Switzerland national futsal team is controlled by the Swiss Football Association, the governing body for futsal in Switzerland and represents the country in international futsal competitions, such as the World Cup and the European Championships.

== Competition history ==
=== FIFA Futsal World Cup ===
FIFA Futsal World Cup record										Qualification record						
Year	Round	Position	Pld	W	D	L	GF	GA	Squad	Outcome	Pld	W	D	L	GF	GA
(Netherlands) 1989	Did not enter									Did not enter						
(Hong Kong) 1992	Did not enter									Did not enter						
(Spain) 1996	Did not enter									Did not enter						
(Guatemala) 2000	Did not enter									Did not enter						
(Taiwan) 2004	Did not enter									Did not enter						
(Brazil) 2008	Did not enter									Did not enter						
(Thailand) 2012	Did not qualify									Group E 4th place	3	0	0	3	2	26
(Colombia) 2016	Did not qualify									Group F 3rd place	2	0	1	1	2	5
(Lithuania) 2021	Did not qualify									Group 6 4th place	6	2	0	4	12	29
(Uzbekistan) 2024	Did not qualify									Group F 3rd place	3	1	0	2	11	12
2028	Did not qualify									Group B 4th place	3	0	2	1	4	13
Total	—	0/11	0	0	0	0	0	0	—	5/10	17	3	3	11	31	85

=== UEFA Futsal Championship ===
- 1996 - did not compete
- 1999 - did not compete
- 2001 - did not compete
- 2003 - did not compete
- 2005 - did not compete
- 2007 - did not compete
- 2010 - did not compete
- 2012 - did not qualify
- 2014 - did not qualify
- 2016 - did not qualify
- 2018 - did not qualify
- 2022 – did not qualify
- 2026 – did not qualify

== Players ==
=== Current squad ===
The following players were called up to the squad for the 2028 FIFA Futsal World Cup qualifying matches against England, Sweden and Northern Ireland on 7, 8 and 10 April 2026 respectively.

No.	Pos.	Player	Date of birth (age)	Caps	Goals	Club
1	GK	Philipp Aranya	30 April 1998 (age 28)			(Swiss Football Association) Mobulu Futsal Uni Bern
22	GK	Edin Ibrišimović	24 January 1995 (age 31)			(Swiss Football Association) Bulle Futsal's
2	DF	Elias Kägi	29 April 1999 (age 27)			(Swiss Football Association) Futsal Minerva
5	DF	Alex Garcia	5 July 1997 (age 29)			(Swiss Football Association) Futsal Maniacs
6	DF	Angel Defrancisco	21 September 1998 (age 28)			(Swiss Football Association) Uni Futsal Team Bulle
11	DF	Agon Xhemajli	26 November 1997 (age 28)			(Swiss Football Association) Bulle Futsal's
17	DF	Laurin Arpagaus	19 July 2004 (age 22)			(Swiss Football Association) Benfica Rorschach
18	DF	Ardit Bytyqi	29 May 1997 (age 29)			(Swiss Football Association) Bulle Futsal's
7	FW	Alex Matos	5 June 2001 (age 25)			(Swiss Football Association) Mobulu Futsal Uni Bern
8	FW	Sabaudin Ljamalari	7 December 1997 (age 28)			(Swiss Football Association) Bulle Futsal's
9	FW	Evangelos Marcoyannakis (captain)	17 July 1992 (age 34)			(Swiss Football Association) Mobulu Futsal Uni Bern
10	FW	Luca Lanzendorfer	25 June 1996 (age 30)			(Swiss Football Association) FC Wil 1900 Futsal
14	FW	Kevin Jaggi	14 December 2003 (age 22)			(Swiss Football Association) Futsal Minerva
19	FW	Ridvan Ljamalari	10 March 2002 (age 24)			(Swiss Football Association) Bulle Futsal's

=== Recent call-ups ===
The following players have also been called up to the squad within the last 12 months.

Pos.	Player	Date of birth (age)	Caps	Goals	Club	Latest call-up
GK	Stefano Köppel	27 June 2006 (age 20)			(Spain) Atlético Mengíbar	v. Greenland, 25 January 2026
DF	Thomas Valentim	23 November 2002 (age 23)			(Switzerland) Uni Futsal Team Bulle	v. Greenland, 25 January 2026
DF	Joshua Gonzalez	5 October 1998 (age 27)			(Switzerland) FC Le Parc	v. Greenland, 25 January 2026
FW	Raphael King	23 March 2000 (age 26)			(Switzerland) Mobulu Futsal Uni Bern	v. Greenland, 25 January 2026
FW	Gabriel Buckson	21 February 1992 (age 34)			(Italy) ASD Monteleone	v. Greenland, 25 January 2026
^{INJ} Player withdrew from the squad due to an injury.^{PRE} Preliminary squad.^{RET} Retired from international futsal.
