= Faroe Islands national futsal team =

Faroe Islands
- Association: Fótbóltssamband Føroya
- Confederation: UEFA
- Head coach: Jens Erik Rasmussen
- Asst coach: Alex Troleis
- Captain: Hanus Jacobsen
- Top scorer: Hanus Jacobsen (4)
- Home stadium: Bylgjan
- FIFA code: FRO
- FIFA ranking: NR (12 December 2025)

First international
- Greenland "B" 6–8 Faroe Islands (Nuuk, Greenland; 29 November 2013)

Biggest win
- Greenland "B" 6–8 Faroe Islands (Nuuk, Greenland; 29 November 2013)

Biggest defeat
- Greenland 6–2 Faroe Islands (Nuuk, Greenland; 30 November 2013)

The Faroe Islands national futsal team is controlled by the Faroe Islands Football Association, the governing body of futsal in the Faroe Islands, and represents the country in international futsal. Although the association is a member of FIFA and UEFA, it has never participated in the UEFA Futsal Championship or the FIFA Futsal World Cup.

== History ==
The first-ever organized futsal tournament in the Faroe Islands was held at the Bylgjan Sports Hall in Runavik in 2011. The Faroe Islands Football Association assembled its-first ever national futsal team in November 2013 for two friendlies against the Greenland in Nuuk. It was also the first time Greenland fielded an official futsal side. On 29 November 2013, the Faroe Islands played Greenland's "B" team and won 8–6 to open the series. The team's goals were scored by Brian Jacobsen (3), Alex José Dos Santos (2), Alex Troleis (2), and Hanus Jacobsen. The Faroese team went on to lose both remaining matches against Greenland's first team.

== All-time fixtures and results ==
Win Draw Loss Fixture

| 29 November 2013 Friendly | Greenland "B" | 6–8 | Faroe Islands | Nuuk, Greenland |
| | | Report; Report | Brian Jacobsen,, Alex José Dos Santos, Alex Troleis, Hanus Jacobsen | Stadium: Inussivik |

| 30 November 2013 Friendly | Greenland | 6–2 | Faroe Islands | Nuuk, Greenland |
| | | Report; Report | Alex José Dos Santos; Hanus Jacobsen | Stadium: Inussivik |

| 1 December 2013 Friendly | Greenland | 5–3 | Faroe Islands | Nuuk, Greenland |
| | | Report; Report | Hanus Jacobsen, Monrad Holm Jacobsen | Stadium: Inussivik |

== Current squad ==
The following players were called up for the friendlies against Greenland in November-December 2013.

- Hallgrím Hansen
- Jákup Andrias Hansen
- Alex Jose dos Santos
- Eli Falkvard Nielsen
- Brian Jacobsen
- Hanus Jacobsen (C)
- Jákup Olsen
- Hákun Edmundsson
- Monrad Jacobsen
- Alex Troleis

== Competitive record ==
=== FIFA Futsal World Cup ===
FIFA Futsal World Cup record
| Year | Round | Pld | W | D | L | GF | GA |
|---|---|---|---|---|---|---|---|
| (Netherlands) 1989 | did not enter | | | | | | |
| (Hong Kong) 1992 | did not enter | | | | | | |
| (Spain) 1996 | did not enter | | | | | | |
| (Guatemala) 2000 | did not enter | | | | | | |
| (Taiwan) 2004 | did not enter | | | | | | |
| (Brazil) 2008 | did not enter | | | | | | |
| (Thailand) 2012 | did not enter | | | | | | |
| (Colombia) 2016 | did not enter | | | | | | |
| (Lithuania) 2021 | did not enter | | | | | | |
| (Uzbekistan) 2024 | did not enter | | | | | | |
| Total | 0/10 | 0 | 0 | 0 | 0 | 0 | 0 |

=== UEFA European Futsal Championship ===
UEFA Futsal Championship record
| Year | Round | Pld | W | D* | L | GF | GA |
|---|---|---|---|---|---|---|---|
| (Spain) 1996 | did not enter | | | | | | |
| (Spain) 1999 | did not enter | | | | | | |
| (Russia) 2001 | did not enter | | | | | | |
| (Italy) 2003 | did not enter | | | | | | |
| (Czech Republic) 2005 | did not enter | | | | | | |
| (Portugal) 2007 | did not enter | | | | | | |
| (Hungary) 2010 | did not enter | | | | | | |
| (Croatia) 2012 | did not enter | | | | | | |
| (Belgium) 2014 | did not enter | | | | | | |
| (Serbia) 2016 | did not enter | | | | | | |
| (Slovenia) 2018 | did not enter | | | | | | |
| (Netherlands) 2022 | did not enter | | | | | | |
| (Latvia) (Lithuania) (Slovenia) 2026 | did not enter | | | | | | |
| Total | 0/13 | 0 | 0 | 0 | 0 | 0 | 0 |
