= San Marino national futsal team =

San Marino
- Nickname(s): La Serenissima "The Dearest One"
- Association: San Marino Football Federation
- Confederation: UEFA (Europe)
- Head coach: (Italy) Roberto Osimani
- FIFA code: SMR
- FIFA ranking: 132 (8 May 2026)
- Highest FIFA ranking: 95 (6 July 2015)
- Lowest FIFA ranking: 116
Home colours	Away colours

First international
- San Marino 2–6 Italy (San Marino, San Marino; 14 July 1985)

Biggest win
- San Marino 2–0 Andorra (Varna, Bulgaria; 1 February 2020); San Marino 4–2 Switzerland (Labin, Croatia; 2 February 2024); Switzerland 3–5 San Marino (Albona, Croatia; 22 January 2026)

Biggest defeat
- San Marino 0–13 Montenegro (Serravalle, San Marino; 1 December 2010)

FIFA World Cup
- Appearances: 0

UEFA Futsal Championship
- Appearances: 0

The San Marino national futsal team is controlled by the San Marino Football Federation, the governing body for futsal in San Marino and represents the country in international futsal competitions, such as the World Cup and the UEFA Futsal Euro.

== Competitive record ==
=== FIFA Futsal World Cup ===
FIFA Futsal World Cup record								Qualification record						
Year	Round	Pld	W	D	L	GF	GA	Outcome	Pld	W	D	L	GF	GA
(Netherlands) 1989	Did not enter							Did not enter						
(Hong Kong) 1992	Did not enter							Did not enter						
(Spain) 1996	Did not enter							Did not enter						
(Guatemala) 2000	Did not enter							Did not enter						
(Taiwan) 2004	Did not enter							Did not enter						
(Brazil) 2008	Did not enter							Did not enter						
(Thailand) 2012	Did not qualify							Group C 4th place	3	0	0	3	5	17
(Colombia) 2016	Did not qualify							Group B 4th place	3	0	0	3	5	14
(Lithuania) 2021	Did not qualify							Group C 4th place	3	0	0	3	1	15
(Uzbekistan) 2024	Did not qualify							Group A 4th place	3	0	0	3	1	8
Total	0/10	0	0	0	0	0	0	4/10	12	0	0	12	12	54

=== UEFA Futsal Championship ===
UEFA Futsal Euro record								Qualification record						
Year	Round	Pld	W	D	L	GF	GA	Outcome	Pld	W	D	L	GF	GA
(Spain) 1996	Did not enter							Did not enter						
(Spain) 1999	Did not enter							Did not enter						
(Russia) 2001	Did not enter							Did not enter						
(Italy) 2003	Did not enter							Did not enter						
(Czech Republic) 2005	Did not enter							Did not enter						
(Portugal) 2007	Did not enter							Did not enter						
(Hungary) 2010	Did not enter							Did not enter						
(Croatia) 2012	Did not qualify							Group E 4th place	3	0	0	3	4	16
(Belgium) 2014	Did not qualify							Group A 4th place	3	0	0	3	5	30
(Serbia) 2016	Did not qualify							Group D 4th place	3	0	0	3	1	23
(Slovenia) 2018	Did not qualify							Group B 4th place	3	0	0	3	3	17
(Netherlands) 2022	Did not qualify							Play-offs	5	1	1	3	5	9
(Latvia) (Lithuania) (Slovenia) 2026	Did not qualify							Group B 4th place	3	0	1	2	3	8
Total	0/13	0	0	0	0	0	0	6/13	20	1	2	17	21	103

== Players ==
=== Current squad ===
The following players were called up to the squad for the 2028 FIFA Futsal World Cup qualifying matches against Latvia, Albania and Cyprus on 9, 10 and 12 April 2026 respectively.

No.	Pos.	Player	Date of birth (age)	Caps	Goals	Club
1	GK	Mattia Protti	15 December 1993 (age 32)			(San Marino Football Federation) Murata
12	GK	Jacopo Pazzini	4 December 2004 (age 21)			(Italian Football Federation) Futsal Cesena
23	GK	Filippo Chiaruzzi	20 November 2005 (age 20)			(San Marino Football Federation) Juvenes Dogana
2	DF	Daniele Maiani	4 August 1993 (age 32)			(San Marino Football Federation) Pennarossa
3	DF	Andrea Ceccoli	22 September 1993 (age 32)			(San Marino Football Federation) Pennarossa
4	DF	Luca Zafferani	6 September 1997 (age 28)			(San Marino Football Federation) Virtus
6	DF	Fabio Belloni (captain)	26 September 1991 (age 34)			(San Marino Football Federation) Virtus
10	DF	Elia Pasqualini	2 June 1997 (age 29)			(San Marino Football Federation) Virtus
5	FW	Marco De Angelis	17 May 1999 (age 27)			(San Marino Football Federation) Murata
7	FW	Paolo Verri	25 May 1997 (age 29)			(San Marino Football Federation) Pennarossa
8	FW	Matteo Moretti	23 November 1999 (age 26)			(San Marino Football Federation) Murata
9	FW	Matteo Chezzi	3 December 2001 (age 24)			(San Marino Football Federation) La Fiorita
11	FW	Samuel Toccaceli	9 November 1996 (age 29)			(San Marino Football Federation) Pennarossa
14	FW	Andrea Ercolani	8 August 1997 (age 28)			(Italian Football Federation) C5 Rimini

=== Recent call-ups ===
The following players have also been called up to the squad within the last 12 months.

Pos.	Player	Date of birth (age)	Caps	Goals	Club	Latest call-up
DF	Jacopo Gamba	28 October 2001 (age 24)			(San Marino) Tre Penne	v. Turkey, 25 January 2026
DF	Lorenzo Cecchini	26 February 2002 (age 24)			(San Marino) La Fiorita	v. Turkey, 25 January 2026
FW	Nicholas Cola	1 December 2005 (age 20)			(San Marino) Tre Penne	v. Turkey, 25 January 2026
FW	Danilo Busignani	13 December 1995 (age 30)			(San Marino) Murata	v. Turkey, 25 January 2026
^{INJ} Player withdrew from the squad due to an injury.^{PRE} Preliminary squad.^{RET} Retired from international futsal.

== Notable players ==
- Manuel Poggiali
