= Norway national futsal team =

Norway
- Association: Football Association of Norway
- Confederation: UEFA (Europe)
- Head coach: Kenneth Rakvaag
- FIFA code: NOR
- FIFA ranking: 82 ▲15 (8 May 2026)
- Highest FIFA ranking: 48 (28 January 2013)
- Lowest FIFA ranking: 70 (12 May 2020)
Home colours	Away colours

First international
- Ireland 1–2 Norway (National Basketball Arena, Tallaght); 30 March 2010)

Biggest win
- Malta 0–6 Norway (Cospicua, Malta; 14 January 2011)

Biggest defeat
- Spain 10–1 Norway (Bembibre, Spain; 11 February 2013)

FIFA World Cup
- Appearances: 0

AMF World Cup
- Appearances: 2 (First in 2007)
- Best result: 1st Round (2007, 2015)

UEFA Futsal Championship
- Appearances: 0

The Norway national futsal team is controlled by the Football Association of Norway, the governing body for futsal in Norway and represents the country in international futsal competitions, such as the World Cup and the European Championships.

== Tournament records ==
=== FIFA Futsal World Cup ===
FIFA World Cup Record
Year	Round	Pld	W	D	L	GS	GA
(Netherlands) 1989	did not enter	-	-	-	-	-	-
(Hong Kong) 1992	did not enter	-	-	-	-	-	-
(Spain) 1996	did not enter	-	-	-	-	-	-
(Guatemala) 2000	did not enter	-	-	-	-	-	-
(Chinese Taipei) 2004	did not enter	-	-	-	-	-	-
(Brazil) 2008	did not enter	-	-	-	-	-	-
(Thailand) 2012	did not qualify	-	-	-	-	-	-
(Colombia) 2016	did not qualify	-	-	-	-	-	-
(Lithuania) 2021	did not qualify	-	-	-	-	-	-
(Uzbekistan) 2024	did not qualify	-	-	-	-	-	-
Total	0/10	-	-	-	-	-	-

=== UEFA Futsal Championship ===
UEFA European Futsal Championship Record
Year	Round	Pld	W	D	L	GS	GA
(Spain) 1996	did not enter	-	-	-	-	-	-
(Spain) 1999	did not enter	-	-	-	-	-	-
(Russia) 2001	did not enter	-	-	-	-	-	-
(Italy) 2003	did not enter	-	-	-	-	-	-
(Czech Republic) 2005	did not enter	-	-	-	-	-	-
(Portugal) 2007	did not enter	-	-	-	-	-	-
(Hungary) 2010	did not enter	-	-	-	-	-	-
(Croatia) 2012	did not qualify	-	-	-	-	-	-
(Belgium) 2014	did not qualify	-	-	-	-	-	-
(Serbia) 2016	did not qualify	-	-	-	-	-	-
(Slovenia) 2018	did not qualify	-	-	-	-	-	-
(Netherlands) 2022	Withdrew						
(Latvia) (Lithuania) (Slovenia) 2026	did not qualify	-	-	-	-	-	-
Total	0/13	-	-	-	-	-	-

== Players ==
=== Current squad ===
The following players were called up to the squad for the 2028 FIFA Futsal World Cup qualifying matches against Estonia, Greece and Israel on 11, 12 and 14 April 2026 respectively.

No.	Pos.	Player	Date of birth (age)	Caps	Goals	Club
1	GK	Andreas Ajer	13 July 1994 (age 32)	54	3	(Norwegian Football Federation) Gamle Oslo
12	GK	Sondre Enlid	14 October 2001 (age 24)	7	0	(Norwegian Football Federation) Utleira
2	DF	Andreas Økland	25 November 1998 (age 27)	45	7	(Norwegian Football Federation) Utleira
3	DF	Ole Løkken	22 December 2000 (age 25)	11	4	(Norwegian Football Federation) KFUM Oslo
4	DF	Lars Røttingsnes	10 August 1993 (age 33)	61	6	(Norwegian Football Federation) KFUM Oslo
6	DF	Sindre Eggen	26 March 1998 (age 28)	35	6	(Norwegian Football Federation) Sjarmtrollan
11	DF	Tobias Lind	29 August 2001 (age 24)	31	1	(Norwegian Football Federation) Sjarmtrollan
13	DF	Even Kvalvær	15 March 1999 (age 27)	17	1	(Norwegian Football Federation) Utleira
14	DF	Arne Holter	11 October 1999 (age 26)	7	2	(Norwegian Football Federation) Gamle Oslo
5	FW	Oskar Andreassen	29 July 1999 (age 27)	44	14	(Norwegian Football Federation) Utleira
7	FW	Christopher Moen	26 June 1991 (age 35)	91	21	(Polish Football Association) Śląsk Futsal
8	FW	Sindre Welo	1 June 1991 (age 35)	52	11	(Norwegian Football Federation) Utleira
9	FW	Magnus Johansen	29 August 1998 (age 27)	41	7	(Norwegian Football Federation) Utleira
10	FW	Tobias Schjetne (captain)	21 August 1991 (age 34)	64	18	(Norwegian Football Federation) Sjarmtrollan

=== Recent call-ups ===
The following players have also been called up to the squad within the last 12 months.

Pos.	Player	Date of birth (age)	Caps	Goals	Club	Latest call-up
DF	Imre Johansen	17 April 2005 (age 21)	2	0	(Norway) Utleira	v. Estonia, 25 January 2026
DF	Richard Halvorsen	20 March 1997 (age 29)	24	3	(Norway) Vesterålen	v. Denmark, 21 December 2025
^{INJ} Player withdrew from the squad due to an injury.^{PRE} Preliminary squad.^{RET} Retired from international futsal.
