= Malta national futsal team =

Malta
- Nickname(s): Knights of Malta, Ħomor (Reds), Falcons
- Association: Malta Football Association
- Confederation: UEFA (Europe)
- Head coach: (Italy) Roberto Menichelli
- FIFA code: MLT
- FIFA ranking: 112 ▼1 (24 September 2026)
Home colours	Away colours

First international
- Malta 1–7 Cyprus (Malta; 18 January 2007)

Biggest win
- Gibraltar 0–8 Malta (Bern, Switzerland; 11 April 2024)

Biggest defeat
- Malta 0–13 Kazakhstan (Malta; 19 January 2007); Slovenia 13–0 Malta (Paola, Malta; 2 March 2008); Belgium 13–0 Malta (Bern, Switzerland; 17 December 2010)

The Malta national futsal team represents Malta in international futsal competitions, such as the FIFA Futsal World Cup and the European Championships, and is controlled by the Malta Football Association.

With 65 caps, Mark Zammit is Malta's most capped player of all time.

== Debut on the European futsal stage ==
Malta was set to make its debut on the European futsal stage when 12 nations competed in the preliminary round of the 2007 UEFA Futsal Championship. The Group C matches were played in Malta, with the national team facing Cyprus, Kazakhstan, and Georgia.

The following 20 players were named in the preliminary squad for selection:

Position	Player
Goalkeeper	Bjorn Vassallo
Goalkeeper	Benny Gialanze
Goalkeeper	Jonathan Pisani
Goalkeeper	Ian Farrugia
Defender	Nicholas Bilocca
Defender	John Cutajar
Defender	Mark Ellul Sullivan
Defender	Michael Portelli
Defender	George Taliana
Defender	Jeanbert Gatt
Forward	Tyron Borg
Forward	Noel Bray
Forward	Alvin Cacciattolo
Forward	Roderick Caruana
Forward	Robert Magro
Forward	Roberto Micallef
Forward	Nebojsa Mijailović
Forward	Branko Pantelić
Forward	Paul Bugeja
Forward	Rene Sciberras

== Competition history ==
=== FIFA Futsal World Cup ===
FIFA Futsal World Cup record										Qualification record						
Year	Round	Position	Pld	W	D	L	GF	GA	Squad	Outcome	Pld	W	D	L	GF	GA
(Netherlands) 1989	Did not enter									Did not enter						
(Hong Kong) 1992	Did not enter									Did not enter						
(Spain) 1996	Did not enter									Did not enter						
(Guatemala) 2000	Did not enter									Did not enter						
(Taiwan) 2004	Did not enter									Did not enter						
(Brazil) 2008	Did not qualify									Group 7 4th place	3	0	0	3	2	17
(Thailand) 2012	Did not qualify									Group A 4th place	3	0	0	3	0	24
(Colombia) 2016	Did not qualify									Group C 4th place	3	0	0	3	6	16
(Lithuania) 2021	Did not qualify									Group E 4th place	3	0	0	3	2	20
(Uzbekistan) 2024	Did not qualify									Group B 4th place	3	0	1	2	3	19
2028	Did not qualify									Group A 3rd place	3	1	0	2	5	13
Total	—	0/11	0	0	0	0	0	0	—	6/10	18	1	1	16	18	109

=== UEFA Futsal Championship ===
UEFA Futsal Championship record								UEFA Futsal Championship qualification record					
Year	Round	Pld	W	D	L	GF	GA	Pld	W	D	L	GF	GA
(Spain) 1996	Did not enter							Did not enter					
(Spain) 1999	Did not enter							Did not enter					
(Russia) 2001	Did not enter							Did not enter					
(Italy) 2003	Did not enter							Did not enter					
(Czech Republic) 2005	Did not enter							Did not enter					
(Portugal) 2007	Did not qualify							3	0	0	3	3	25
(Hungary) 2010	Did not qualify							3	0	0	3	4	13
(Croatia) 2012	Did not qualify							3	0	0	3	2	18
(Belgium) 2014	Did not qualify							2	0	0	2	1	13
(Serbia) 2016	Did not qualify							3	0	0	3	0	15
(Slovenia) 2018	Did not qualify							3	0	0	3	4	15
(Netherlands) 2022	Did not qualify							3	0	1	2	5	18
(Latvia) (Lithuania) (Slovenia) 2026	Did not qualify							6	0	0	6	2	37
Total (0/7)								26	0	0	24	18	140

== Players ==
=== Current squad ===
The following players were called up to the squad for the 2028 FIFA Futsal World Cup qualifying matches against Denmark, Andorra and Scotland on 8, 9 and 11 April 2026 respectively.

No.	Pos.	Player	Date of birth (age)	Caps	Goals	Club
1	GK	Clint Mifsud (captain)	25 November 1989 (age 36)			(Malta Football Association) University of Malta
12	GK	Ryan Marmara	29 August 1988 (age 38)			(Malta Football Association) Luxol St Andrews
19	GK	Andrej Trajkoski	31 May 2007 (age 19)			(Malta Football Association) Birżebbuġa St. Peter's
3	DF	Celino Alves	29 October 1987 (age 38)			(Malta Football Association) Luxol St Andrews
4	DF	Michael Borg	18 October 1992 (age 33)			(Malta Football Association) Luxol St Andrews
7	DF	Aidan Buhagiar	28 December 2007 (age 18)			(Malta Football Association) Luxol St Andrews
8	DF	Andre Cachia	5 January 1997 (age 29)			(Malta Football Association) University of Malta
14	DF	Marrwan Telisi	4 November 1987 (age 38)			(Malta Football Association) Luxol St Andrews
5	FW	Kaden Baldacchino	28 May 2008 (age 18)			(Malta Football Association) Malta U17
6	FW	Giancarlo Sammut	7 May 1995 (age 31)			(German Football Association) HOT 05 Futsal
10	FW	Maikinho	25 March 1995 (age 31)			(Malta Football Association) Luxol St Andrews
11	FW	Luke Gatt	5 February 1998 (age 28)			(Malta Football Association) Luxol St Andrews
16	FW	Nathan Cope	29 June 2004 (age 22)			(Malta Football Association) Luxol St Andrews
17	FW	Karl Schembri	3 November 1999 (age 26)			(Malta Football Association) Marsaskala Futsal
21	FW	Collin Sammut	6 December 2005 (age 20)			(Malta Football Association) Luxol St Andrews

=== Recent call-ups ===
The following players have also been called up to the squad within the last 12 months.

Pos.	Player	Date of birth (age)	Caps	Goals	Club	Latest call-up
GK	Matthias Borg	14 August 2005 (age 21)			(Malta) Luxol St Andrews	v. Scotland, 25 January 2026
DF	Zac Portelli	22 September 2009 (age 17)			Malta U17	v. Scotland, 25 January 2026
FW	Nezar Abouaisha	4 August 1994 (age 32)			(Malta) Żejtun Corinthians	v. Scotland, 25 January 2026
FW	Maksim Radojevic	18 December 2008 (age 17)			(Malta) Sliema Futsal	v. Scotland, 25 January 2026
^{INJ} Player withdrew from the squad due to an injury.^{PRE} Preliminary squad.^{RET} Retired from international futsal.
