= Denmark national futsal team =

National sports team

Denmark
- Shirt badge/Association crest
- Nickname(s): Danish Dynamite; De Rød-Hvide (The Red and White); Olsen-Banden (The Olsen Gang); Olsens Elleve (Olsen's Eleven); The Red and White Football Aces
- Association: Danish Football Association
- Confederation: UEFA (Europe)
- Head coach: Nikolaj Klein Saabye
- FIFA code: DEN
- FIFA ranking: 60 ▲1 (8 May 2026)
Home colours	Away colours

First international
- Denmark 2–4 Netherlands (Rotterdam, Netherlands; January 5, 1989)

Biggest win
- Denmark 9–1 Gibraltar (January 15, 2015)

Biggest defeat
- Denmark 0–10 Brazil (Brondby, Denmark; October 7, 2023)

FIFA World Cup
- Appearances: 1 (First in 1989)
- Best result: 1st round (1989)

UEFA Futsal Championship
- Appearances: -

The Denmark national futsal team is controlled by the Danish Football Association, the governing body for futsal in Denmark and represents the country in international futsal competitions, such as the FIFA Futsal World Cup and UEFA Futsal Championship.

== Tournament records ==
=== FIFA Futsal World Cup ===
FIFA World Cup Record
Year	Round	Pld	W	D	L	GS	GA
Netherlands 1989	1st round	3	1	1	1	12	10
Hong Kong 1992	did not enter	-	-	-	-	-	-
Spain 1996	did not enter	-	-	-	-	-	-
Guatemala 2000	did not enter	-	-	-	-	-	-
Taiwan 2004	did not enter	-	-	-	-	-	-
Brazil 2008	did not enter	-	-	-	-	-	-
Thailand 2012	did not enter	-	-	-	-	-	-
Colombia 2016	did not qualify	-	-	-	-	-	-
Lithuania 2021	did not qualify	-	-	-	-	-	-
Uzbekistan 2024	did not qualify	-	-	-	-	-	-
Total	1/10	3	1	1	1	12	10

=== UEFA European Futsal Championship ===
UEFA European Futsal Championship Record
Year	Round	Pld	W	D	L	GS	GA
Spain 1996	did not enter	-	-	-	-	-	-
Spain 1999	did not enter	-	-	-	-	-	-
Russia 2001	did not enter	-	-	-	-	-	-
Italy 2003	did not enter	-	-	-	-	-	-
Czech Republic 2005	did not enter	-	-	-	-	-	-
Portugal 2007	did not enter	-	-	-	-	-	-
Hungary 2010	did not enter	-	-	-	-	-	-
Croatia 2012	did not enter	-	-	-	-	-	-
Belgium 2014	did not qualify	-	-	-	-	-	-
Serbia 2016	did not qualify	-	-	-	-	-	-
Slovenia 2018	did not qualify	-	-	-	-	-	-
Netherlands 2022	did not qualify	-	-	-	-	-	-
Latvia/Lithuania/Slovenia 2026	did not qualify	-	-	-	-	-	-
Total	0/13	-	-	-	-	-	-

== Players ==
=== Current squad ===
The following players were called up to the squad for the 2028 FIFA Futsal World Cup qualifying matches against Malta, Scotland and Andorra on 8, 9 and 11 April 2026 respectively.

No.	Pos.	Player	Date of birth (age)	Caps	Goals	Club
1	GK	William Rams	28 October 1998 (age 27)	37	1	(Danish Football Association) Hjørring Futsal Klub
16	GK	Nicklas Fuchs-Christiansen	20 June 2003 (age 23)	10	1	(Danish Football Association) Hundested IK
4	DF	Ermin Kasumovic	12 December 1995 (age 30)	30	4	(Danish Football Association) Hjørring Futsal Klub
5	DF	Mohammed Youssef	23 September 1995 (age 30)	41	4	(Danish Football Association) Albertslund IF
6	DF	Rasmus Johansson	4 April 1995 (age 31)	53	8	(Danish Football Association) JB Futsal Gentofte
8	DF	Zakaria El-Ouaz	19 June 1996 (age 30)	93	22	(Danish Football Association) Albertslund IF
12	DF	Ibrahim Badran	16 February 1994 (age 32)	58	8	(Danish Football Association) Albertslund IF
15	DF	Abbas Zankaneh Mushtak	28 August 1999 (age 26)	11	0	(Danish Football Association) Albertslund IF
3	FW	Sune Breum Kristensen	29 September 2000 (age 25)	7	2	(Danish Football Association) Aalborg Futsal Klub
7	FW	Emil Rasmussen	30 January 1997 (age 29)	76	35	(Danish Football Association) JB Futsal Gentofte
9	FW	Oliver Børsting	30 August 2002 (age 23)	7	2	(Danish Football Association) Eastside Viborg Futsal
10	FW	Mads Falck (captain)	4 June 1990 (age 36)	100	54	(Danish Football Association) JB Futsal Gentofte
11	FW	William Gantzhorn	27 April 2003 (age 23)	30	10	(Danish Football Association) Hjørring Futsal Klub
14	FW	Nicolai Jægergaard	20 October 1997 (age 28)	14	1	(Danish Football Association) Hundested IK

=== Recent call-ups ===
The following players have also been called up to the squad within the last 12 months.

Pos.	Player	Date of birth (age)	Caps	Goals	Club	Latest call-up
DF	Ruben Winther	27 March 1995 (age 31)	18	8	(Denmark) Hjørring Futsal Klub	v. Azerbaijan, 24 January 2026
DF	Zlatan Henic	24 March 2001 (age 25)	4	1	(Denmark) JB Futsal Gentofte	v. Azerbaijan, 24 January 2026
DF	Cornelius Ambeck-Nørgaard	5 November 2004 (age 21)	4	0	(Denmark) Esbjerg Futsal	v. Azerbaijan, 24 January 2026
DF	Esajas la Cour	8 August 1998 (age 27)	3	0	(Denmark) København Futsal	v. Azerbaijan, 24 January 2026
FW	Tobias Veng	30 September 2002 (age 23)	6	0	(Denmark) Eastside Viborg Futsal	v. Azerbaijan, 24 January 2026
FW	Casper Rytter	27 February 2000 (age 26)	2	1	(Denmark) Hundested IK	v. Azerbaijan, 24 January 2026
FW	Rasmus Philipsen	25 February 1999 (age 27)	2	1	(Denmark) Hundested IK	v. Azerbaijan, 24 January 2026
FW	Hans Christian Ricken	28 April 2002 (age 24)	2	1	(Denmark) Eastside Viborg Futsal	v. Azerbaijan, 24 January 2026
FW	Mikkel Foged Hansen	18 March 1999 (age 27)	25	7	(Denmark) JB Futsal Gentofte	v. Azerbaijan, 22 January 2026^{PRE}
FW	Tim Vigilsen Wiese	16 August 1996 (age 29)	11	3	(Denmark) Albertslund IF	v. Azerbaijan, 22 January 2026^{PRE}
^{INJ} Player withdrew from the squad due to an injury.^{PRE} Preliminary squad.^{RET} Retired from international futsal.
