= 2021 FIFA Futsal World Cup qualification (UEFA) =

Tournament details
- Dates: 29 January 2019 – 9 December 2020
- Teams: 48 (from 1 confederation)

Tournament statistics
- Matches played: 124
- Goals scored: 752 (6.06 per match)
- Top scorer(s): (Kazakhstan) Douglas Júnior (Bosnia and Herzegovina) Anel Radmilović (Netherlands) Mats Velseboer (8 goals each)

The European qualifying competition for the 2020 FIFA Futsal World Cup was a men's futsal competition that determined the six UEFA teams joining the automatically qualified hosts Lithuania in the 2021 FIFA Futsal World Cup (originally 2020 but postponed due to COVID-19 pandemic).

Apart from Lithuania, a record 48 of the remaining 54 UEFA nations entered the competition, including World Cup qualifying debutants Germany, Kosovo, Scotland, and Northern Ireland who entered their first international men's futsal competition.

== Format ==
The qualifying competition consists of four rounds:

- Preliminary round: The lowest-ranked 32 teams play in the preliminary round, and are drawn into eight groups of four teams. The winners and runners-up of each group advance to the main round to join the 16 highest-ranked teams which receive byes to the main round.
- Main round: The 32 teams are drawn into eight groups of four. The winners and runners-up of each group advance to the elite round.
- Elite round: The 16 teams are drawn into four groups of four. The winners of each group qualify directly for the World Cup, while the runners-up advance to the play-offs.
- Play-offs: The four teams are drawn into two ties to play home-and-away two-legged matches to determine the last two European qualified teams.

In the preliminary round, main round and elite round, each group is played as a round-robin mini-tournament at the pre-selected hosts.

=== Tiebreakers ===
In the preliminary round, main round and elite round, teams are ranked according to points (3 points for a win, 1 point for a draw, 0 points for a loss), and if tied on points, the following tiebreaking criteria are applied, in the order given, to determine the rankings (Regulations Articles 13.01 and 13.02):

1. Points in head-to-head matches among tied teams;
2. Goal difference in head-to-head matches among tied teams;
3. Goals scored in head-to-head matches among tied teams;
4. If more than two teams are tied, and after applying all head-to-head criteria above, a subset of teams are still tied, all head-to-head criteria above are reapplied exclusively to this subset of teams;
5. Goal difference in all group matches;
6. Goals scored in all group matches;
7. Penalty shoot-out if only two teams have the same number of points, and they met in the last round of the group and are tied after applying all criteria above (not used if more than two teams have the same number of points, or if their rankings are not relevant for qualification for the next stage);
8. Disciplinary points (red card = 3 points, yellow card = 1 point, expulsion for two yellow cards in one match = 3 points);
9. UEFA coefficient;
10. Drawing of lots.

In the play-offs, the team that scores more goals on aggregate over the two legs qualifies for the final tournament. If the aggregate score is level, the away goals rule is applied, i.e., the team that scores more goals away from home over the two legs advances. If away goals are also equal, extra time is played. The away goals rule is again applied after extra time, i.e., if there are goals scored during extra time and the aggregate score is still level, the visiting team advances by virtue of more away goals scored. If no goals are scored during extra time, the tie is decided by penalty shoot-out (Regulations Article 16.01).

== Teams ==
The 48 teams were seeded according to the coefficient ranking, calculated based on the following:

- UEFA Futsal Euro 2016 final tournament and qualifying competition
- 2016 FIFA Futsal World Cup final tournament and qualifying competition
- UEFA Futsal Euro 2018 final tournament and qualifying competition

The coefficient ranking was also used for seeding in the preliminary round and main round draws, where each team was assigned a seeding position according to their ranking for the respective draw. Eight teams were pre-selected as hosts for the preliminary round and eight teams were pre-selected as hosts for the main round.

The draws for the preliminary round and main round was held on 12 December 2018, 14:00 CET (UTC+1), at the UEFA headquarters in Nyon, Switzerland. The mechanism of the draws for each round was as follows:

- In the preliminary round, the 32 teams were drawn into eight groups of four containing one team from each of the seeding positions 1–4. First, the eight teams which were pre-selected as hosts were drawn from their own designated pot and allocated to their respective group as per their seeding positions. Next, the remaining 24 teams were drawn from their respective pot which were allocated according to their seeding positions. Based on the decisions taken by the UEFA Emergency Panel, Kosovo and Bosnia and Herzegovina could not be drawn in the same group.
- In the main round, the 32 teams were drawn into eight groups of four, containing one team from each of the seeding positions 1–4. First, the eight teams which were pre-selected as hosts were drawn from their own designated pot and allocated to their respective group as per their seeding positions. Next, the remaining 24 teams were drawn from their respective pot which were allocated according to their seeding positions (including the eight preliminary round winners and eight preliminary round runners-up, whose identity was not known at the time of the draw, which were allocated to seeding positions 3 and 4 respectively). Winners and runners-up from the same preliminary round group could not be drawn in the same group. Based on the decisions taken by the UEFA Emergency Panel, should Armenia, Gibraltar, or Kosovo advance from the preliminary round and qualify for a main round group with Azerbaijan (Armenia), Spain (Gibraltar), or Bosnia and Herzegovina or Serbia (Kosovo), they would be swapped with the preliminary round group winner or runner-up in the same seeding position (3 or 4) of the next possible main round group. Should Kosovo, Bosnia and Herzegovina and Serbia all end up in the same group, the preliminary round group runner-up would be moved first to the next possible main round group, followed, if necessary, by the preliminary round group winner to avoid the clashes.

World Cup hosts
Team	Coeff.	Rank
**Lithuania**	0.389	40

Participating teams for 2020 FIFA Futsal World Cup European qualifying

Teams entering main round
Team	Coeff.	Rank	Seed
Russia	10.171	1	1
Spain	10.022	2	1
Portugal **(H)**	9.633	3	1
Kazakhstan	9.000	4	1
Ukraine **(H)**	8.389	5	1
Azerbaijan **(H)**	7.822	6	1
Italy **(H)**	7.444	7	1
Serbia	6.833	8	1
Slovenia	6.500	9	2
Croatia **(H)**	4.278	10	2
Hungary	4.111	11	2
Czech Republic	3.611	12	2
Romania **(H)**	3.500	13	2
Poland **(H)**	3.389	14	2
France **(H)**	2.944	15	2
Slovakia	2.944	16	2

Teams entering preliminary round
Team	Coeff.	Rank	Seed
Belarus **(H)**	2.889	17	1
Netherlands	2.278	18	1
Bosnia and Herzegovina **(H)**	2.222	19	1
Belgium	2.111	20	1
Georgia **(H)**	2.056	21	1
North Macedonia **(H)**	2.000	22	1
Finland	1.694	23	1
Latvia **(H)**	1.222	24	1
Turkey	1.222	25	2
Moldova **(H)**	0.833	26	2
England	0.833	27	2
Albania	0.778	28	2
Sweden **(H)**	0.778	29	2
Montenegro	0.722	30	2
Denmark	0.722	31	2
Norway	0.722	32	2
Kosovo	0.667	33	3
Switzerland	0.583	34	3
Bulgaria **(H)**	0.556	35	3
Armenia	0.500	36	3
Greece	0.500	37	3
Germany	0.500	38	3
Wales	0.389	39	3
Cyprus	0.389	41	3
Israel	0.278	42	4
Andorra	0.222	43	4
Estonia	0.111	44	4
Malta	0.000	45	4
Gibraltar	0.000	46	4
San Marino	0.000	47	4
Scotland	0.000	48	4
Northern Ireland	0.000	(NR)	4

Notes

- Teams marked in **bold** have qualified for the World Cup.
- (NR) – No rank (men's team did not enter in the competitions used for computing coefficients)
- (H): Teams pre-selected as hosts for the preliminary round and the main round

Did not enter (all no rank)
Austria	Faroe Islands	Iceland
Liechtenstein	Luxembourg	Republic of Ireland

== Schedule ==
The qualifying matches are played on dates that fall within the FIFA Futsal International Match Calendar.

Schedule for 2020 FIFA Futsal World Cup European qualifying
Round	Draw	Dates
Preliminary round	12 December 2018	29 January – 3 February 2019
Main round	12 December 2018	22–27 October 2019
Elite round	7 November 2019	27 January – 5 February 2020
Play-offs	7 November 2019	2–11 November 2020 (originally 9 and 12 April 2020)

In the preliminary round, main round and elite round, the schedule of each group is as follows, with one rest day between matchdays 2 and 3 for four-team groups, and no rest days for three-team groups (Regulations Articles 18.04, 18.05 and 18.06):

Note: For scheduling, the hosts are considered as Team 1, while the visiting teams are considered as Team 2, Team 3, and Team 4 according to their seeding positions.

Group schedule
Matchday	Matches (4 teams)	Matches (3 teams)
Matchday 1	2 v 4, 1 v 3	1 v 3
Matchday 2	3 v 2, 1 v 4	3 v 2
Matchday 3	4 v 3, 2 v 1	2 v 1

== Preliminary round ==
The winners and runners-up of each group advanced to the main round to join the 16 teams which receive byes. The preliminary round was scheduled to be played between 29 January and 3 February 2019.

Times are CET (UTC+1), as listed by UEFA (local times, if different, are in parentheses).

=== Group A ===
Pos	Team	Pld	W	D	L	GF	GA	GD	Pts	Qualification
1	Latvia (H)	3	2	1	0	12	1	+11	7	Main round
2	England	3	2	0	1	10	8	+2	6	Main round
3	Cyprus	3	1	1	1	15	5	+10	4	
4	Gibraltar	3	0	0	3	1	24	−23	0	

Source: UEFA
Rules for classification: Tiebreakers
(H) Hosts
30 January 2019
15:30 (16:30 EET)

England	4–1	Gibraltar
Medina 2:20; Ward 14:37 (pen.), 39:59; Palfreeman 32:05	Report	Parker 17:12

Zemgale Olympic Center, Jelgava
Referee: Lukáš Peško (Slovakia), Jacob Pawlowski (Germany)
30 January 2019
18:30 (19:30 EET)

Latvia	0–0	Cyprus
	Report

Zemgale Olympic Center, Jelgava
Referee: Kirill Naishouler (Finland), Besart Ismajli (Kosovo)

31 January 2019
15:30 (16:30 EET)

Cyprus	4–5	England
Chadjigeorgiou 6:11, 13:02, 31:25; Perikleous 22:06	Report	Reed 4:04; Rexha 4:24; Wallace 14:43; Bettson 22:30; Webb 39:51

Zemgale Olympic Center, Jelgava
Referee: Besart Ismajli (Kosovo), Lukáš Peško (Slovakia)
31 January 2019
18:30 (19:30 EET)

Latvia	9–0	Gibraltar
Matjušenko 2:01, 25:45, 31:44; Pastars 11:09; Koļesņikovs 19:09, 22:44; Avanesovs 24:28; Kuļešovs 25:03; Rodriguez 27:01 (o.g.)	Report

Zemgale Olympic Center, Jelgava
Referee: Jacob Pawlowski (Germany), Kirill Naishouler (Finland)

2 February 2019
13:00 (14:00 EET)

Gibraltar	0–11	Cyprus
	Report	Omirou 4:03, 30:42; Ioannou 4:48, 28:15; Perikleous 7:06, 23:57, 26:02; Zantis 15:27; Diniz Pereira 22:32; Chadjigeorgiou 25:22; Kouloumbris 29:11

Zemgale Olympic Center, Jelgava
Referee: Lukáš Peško (Slovakia), Besart Ismajli (Kosovo)
2 February 2019
16:00 (17:00 EET)

England	1–3	Latvia
Ward 39:39	Report	Koļesņikovs 1:32; Rožkovskis 34:52, 39:59

Zemgale Olympic Center, Jelgava
Referee: Kirill Naishouler (Finland), Jacob Pawlowski (Germany)

=== Group B ===
Pos	Team	Pld	W	D	L	GF	GA	GD	Pts	Qualification
1	Belarus (H)	3	3	0	0	17	1	+16	9	Main round
2	Kosovo	3	2	0	1	10	9	+1	6	Main round
3	Norway	3	1	0	2	7	15	−8	3	
4	Andorra	3	0	0	3	6	15	−9	0	

Source: UEFA
Rules for classification: Tiebreakers
(H) Hosts
30 January 2019
16:00 (18:00 FET)

Norway	5–3	Andorra
Moen 15:41, 27:14; Schjetne 21:24; Wiseth 22:28, 37:33	Report	Debboun 14:22; Dos Santos 20:00, 39:36

Sports Hall SCA, Minsk
Referee: Victor Berg-Audic (France), Shota Kukhilava (Georgia)
30 January 2019
18:30 (20:30 FET)

Belarus	5–0	Kosovo
Olshevski 6:41; Rukovci 8:27 (o.g.); Scherbich 10:16 (2pen.); Zhigalko 21:10; Goli 25:24 (o.g.)	Report

Sports Hall SCA, Minsk
Referee: Daniel Matkovic (Switzerland), Eduards Fatkulins (Latvia)

31 January 2019
17:00 (19:00 FET)

Kosovo	5–1	Norway
Rukovci 3:05; Alaj 18:58, 22:07, 34:35 (pen.); Topilla 37:20	Report	Wiseth 33:21

Sports Hall SCA, Minsk
Referee: Eduards Fatkulins (Latvia), Victor Berg-Audic (France)
31 January 2019
19:45 (21:45 FET)

Belarus	5–0	Andorra
Gorbenko 1:46; Lazyuk 4:32; Scherbich 5:12; Selyuk 5:58; Chibisov 14:55	Report

Sports Hall SCA, Minsk
Referee: Shota Kukhilava (Georgia), Daniel Matkovic (Switzerland)

2 February 2019
09:15 (11:15 FET)

Andorra	3–5	Kosovo
Rodriguez Sierra 3:09; Perez 35:11, 39:27	Report	Alaj 5:00, 28:20, 32:29 (pen.); Gjinovci 10:37; Topilla 24:25

Sports Hall SCA, Minsk
Referee: Eduards Fatkulins (Latvia), Shota Kukhilava (Georgia)
2 February 2019
12:15 (14:15 FET)

Norway	1–7	Belarus
Moen 8:53	Report	Gusakov 2:23; Scherbich 11:56; Selyuk 25:18; Kvalvær 28:31 (o.g.); Gorbenko 30:03; Los 37:47; Shimanovski 39:24

Sports Hall SCA, Minsk
Referee: Victor Berg-Audic (France), Daniel Matkovic (Switzerland)

=== Group C ===
Pos	Team	Pld	W	D	L	GF	GA	GD	Pts	Qualification
1	North Macedonia (H)	3	3	0	0	15	5	+10	9	Main round
2	Albania	3	2	0	1	12	6	+6	6	Main round
3	Greece	3	1	0	2	9	11	−2	3	
4	San Marino	3	0	0	3	1	15	−14	0	

Source: UEFA
Rules for classification: Tiebreakers
(H) Hosts
31 January 2019
17:30

Albania	5–0	San Marino
Selmanaj 10:46; Alibegu 11:45; Alimi 13:07; Kaca 29:03; Rexhepaj 36:20	Report

Jane Sandanski Arena, Skopje
Referee: Moshe Bohbot (Israel), Grigori Ošomkov (Estonia)
31 January 2019
20:00

North Macedonia	5–3	Greece
Andov 2:58; Ziberi 9:39; Leveski 15:29; Krstevski 38:01, 39:55	Report	Stavrakopoulos 29:53; Ntarlas 31:57 (pen.), 35:12

Jane Sandanski Arena, Skopje
Referee: Dario Pezzuto (Italy), Viktor Bugenko (Moldova)

1 February 2019
17:30

Greece	3–5	Albania
Papaefstratiou 24:14; Kondylatos 27:09; Gkaifyllias 36:51	Report	Halimi 1:05; Mejzini 2:24; Alimi 15:06; Selmanaj 27:40, 37:53

Jane Sandanski Arena, Skopje
Referee: Grigori Ošomkov (Estonia), Dario Pezzuto (Italy)
1 February 2019
20:00

North Macedonia	7–0	San Marino
Ziberi 1:55; Krstevski 2:36; Gligorov 4:22; Seferi 6:31; Andov 13:55; Leovski 21:31; Leveski 26:01	Report

Jane Sandanski Arena, Skopje
Referee: Viktor Bugenko (Moldova), Moshe Bohbot (Israel)

3 February 2019
17:30

San Marino	1–3	Greece
Moretti 20:23	Report	Artinos 16:37; Kondylatos 18:14; Delaportas 26:30

Jane Sandanski Arena, Skopje
Referee: Grigori Ošomkov (Estonia), Viktor Bugenko (Moldova)
3 February 2019
20:00

Albania	2–3	North Macedonia
Rexhepaj 5:08; Kaca 12:09	Report	Ziberi 0:14, 23:22; Ismaili 24:38

Jane Sandanski Arena, Skopje
Referee: Dario Pezzuto (Italy), Moshe Bohbot (Israel)

=== Group D ===
Pos	Team	Pld	W	D	L	GF	GA	GD	Pts	Qualification
1	Georgia (H)	3	3	0	0	18	3	+15	9	Main round
2	Germany	3	1	1	1	8	9	−1	4	Main round
3	Israel	3	0	2	1	3	10	−7	2	
4	Denmark	3	0	1	2	5	12	−7	1	

Source: UEFA
Rules for classification: Tiebreakers
(H) Hosts
30 January 2019
14:30 (17:30 GET)

Denmark	1–1	Israel
Jørgensen 37:30 (2pen.)	Report	Jubran 37:51

Olympic Palace, Tbilisi
Referee: Fredric Nilholt (Sweden), Slawomir Steczko (Poland)
30 January 2019
17:30 (20:30 GET)

Georgia	5–1	Germany
Roninho 10:10 (pen.); Sözer 12:03 (o.g.); Saiotti Junior 16:02, 32:02; Sebiskveradze 31:34	Report	Erdem 38:47

Olympic Palace, Tbilisi
Referee: Vladimir Kadykov (Russia), Kaloyan Kirilov (Bulgaria)

31 January 2019
14:30 (17:30 GET)

Germany	5–2	Denmark
Erdem 7:34, 8:16; Sözer 26:45, 37:24; Heinze 34:36	Report	Jørgensen 18:12, 20:27

Olympic Palace, Tbilisi
Referee: Slawomir Steczko (Poland), Vladimir Kadykov (Russia)
31 January 2019
17:30 (20:30 GET)

Georgia	7–0	Israel
Thales 3:13, 8:30, 10:00; Tophuria 5:05; Fumaça 8:44; Nikvashvili 23:36; Jvarashvili 35:46	Report

Olympic Palace, Tbilisi
Referee: Kaloyan Kirilov (Bulgaria), Fredric Nilholt (Sweden)

2 February 2019
14:30 (17:30 GET)

Israel	2–2	Germany
Shkolnik 0:52; Diedunov 27:01	Report	Heinze 21:41; Wittig 39:51

Olympic Palace, Tbilisi
Referee: Fredric Nilholt (Sweden), Kaloyan Kirilov (Bulgaria)
2 February 2019
17:30 (20:30 GET)

Denmark	2–6	Georgia
Larsen 35:30; Jørgensen 38:36	Report	Roninho 27:22; Kekelia 29:17, 38:07; Tophuria 30:12; Saiotti Junior 30:43; Thales 33:40

Olympic Palace, Tbilisi
Referee: Vladimir Kadykov (Russia), Slawomir Steczko (Poland)

=== Group E ===
Pos	Team	Pld	W	D	L	GF	GA	GD	Pts	Qualification
1	Belgium	3	3	0	0	26	7	+19	9	Main round
2	Sweden (H)	3	2	0	1	13	10	+3	6	Main round
3	Armenia	3	1	0	2	6	10	−4	3	
4	Malta	3	0	0	3	2	20	−18	0	

Source: UEFA
Rules for classification: Tiebreakers
(H) Hosts
30 January 2019
15:30

Belgium	12–0	Malta
Diniz Pinheiro 4:57, 25:51; Ndjeka 11:53; Ouadi 14:32, 28:04; Sababti 15:32; Chaibai 18:27, 39:13; Zammit 23:45 (o.g.); Dujacquier 29:55; Adnane 30:35; Cordier 34:54	Report

Estrad Alingsås, Alingsås
Referee: Alessandro Malfer (Italy), Alem Bajrovic (Bosnia and Herzegovina)
30 January 2019
19:00

Sweden	3–1	Armenia
Legiec 14:04, 15:20; Kadivar 24:54	Report	Galstyan 19:04

Estrad Alingsås, Alingsås
Referee: Hennadiy Hora (Ukraine), Jacob Willem Machiel Van Dijke (Netherlands)

31 January 2019
15:30

Armenia	2–6	Belgium
Uzunyan 26:28; Mkrtchyan 31:42	Report	Leo 7:22, 15:39; Karapetyan 22:36 (o.g.); Chaibai 30:06 (pen.); Adnane 31:08; Diniz Pinheiro 36:45

Estrad Alingsås, Alingsås
Referee: Jacob Willem Machiel Van Dijke (Netherlands), Alessandro Malfer (Italy)
31 January 2019
19:00

Sweden	5–1	Malta
Smajlovic 2:25; Atai Najafi 3:49, 33:53; Zhubi 5:50; Kadivar 39:51	Report	Zammit 28:16

Estrad Alingsås, Alingsås
Referee: Alem Bajrovic (Bosnia and Herzegovina), Hennadiy Hora (Ukraine)

2 February 2019
13:30

Malta	1–3	Armenia
Mangion 20:57	Report	Galstyan 2:30; Margaryan 6:12; Mkrtchyan 26:28

Estrad Alingsås, Alingsås
Referee: Alem Bajrovic (Bosnia and Herzegovina), Jacob Willem Machiel Van Dijke (Netherlands)
2 February 2019
17:00

Belgium	8–5	Sweden
Dujacquier 6:49, 35:45, 38:05; Diniz Pinheiro 9:18, 31:48; Sababti 19:53, 21:00; Adnane 20:27	Report	Zhubi 0:12, 4:03; Hiseni 11:25; Legiec 24:38; Söderqvist 37:25

Estrad Alingsås, Alingsås
Referee: Alessandro Malfer (Italy), Hennadiy Hora (Ukraine)

=== Group F ===
Pos	Team	Pld	W	D	L	GF	GA	GD	Pts	Qualification
1	Bosnia and Herzegovina (H)	3	3	0	0	24	4	+20	9	Main round
2	Switzerland	3	2	0	1	8	10	−2	6	Main round
3	Turkey	3	1	0	2	8	13	−5	3	
4	Scotland	3	0	0	3	5	18	−13	0	

Source: UEFA
Rules for classification: Tiebreakers
(H) Hosts
29 January 2019
17:00

Bosnia and Herzegovina	7–1	Switzerland
Kahvedžić 4:12, 11:18, 20:15; Bošković 16:45; Galić 26:13; Radmilović 30:34; Jelić 36:58	Report	Marcoyannakis 9:39

Arena Zenica, Zenica
Referee: Alejandro Martinez Flores (Spain), Maksim Dzeikala (Belarus)
29 January 2019
20:00

Turkey	4–3	Scotland
Ugurlu 2:45, 19:21; Özdemir 10:07; Altunary 29:25	Report	McLaren 7:40, 30:12; Yates 25:43

Arena Zenica, Zenica
Referee: Stefan Vrijens (Belgium), Vlad Nicolae Ciobanu (Romania)

30 January 2019
17:00

Switzerland	3–2	Turkey
Facchinetti 8:38, 12:31, 28:49	Report	Özkan 11:38; Altunay 14:23

Arena Zenica, Zenica
Referee: Vlad Nicolae Ciobanu (Romania), Alejandro Martinez Flores (Spain)
30 January 2019
20:00

Bosnia and Herzegovina	10–1	Scotland
Aladžić 4:26, 11:25, 22:33; Ivanković 6:44; Pavlović 12:04; Jelić 20:17; Radmilović 21:48, 31:04, 37:20, 37:52	Report	Steedman 27:39

Arena Zenica, Zenica
Referee: Maksim Dzeikala (Belarus), Stefan Vrijens (Belgium)

1 February 2019
17:00

Scotland	1–4	Switzerland
Smith 38:08	Report	Marcoyannakis 0:57; Facchinetti 11:13 (pen.); Buckson 17:22; Huber 17:58

Arena Zenica, Zenica
Referee: Maksim Dzeikala (Belarus), Vlad Nicolae Ciobanu (Romania)
1 February 2019
20:00

Turkey	2–7	Bosnia and Herzegovina
Özkan 29:09; Şen 36:30	Report	Kahvedžić 4:41, 19:20, 32:55; Radmilović 22:11, 23:02; Jelić 26:16; Aladžić 31:19

Arena Zenica, Zenica
Referee: Alejandro Martinez Flores (Spain), Stefan Vrijens (Belgium)

=== Group G ===
Pos	Team	Pld	W	D	L	GF	GA	GD	Pts	Qualification
1	Netherlands	3	3	0	0	14	4	+10	9	Main round
2	Montenegro	3	1	1	1	7	5	+2	4	Main round
3	Bulgaria (H)	3	1	1	1	5	9	−4	4	
4	Estonia	3	0	0	3	3	11	−8	0	

Source: UEFA
Rules for classification: Tiebreakers
(H) Hosts
30 January 2019
15:45 (16:45 EET)

Bulgaria	1–1	Montenegro
Tsvetanov 8:12	Report	Tsvetanov 13:15 (o.g.)

Palace of Culture and Sports, Varna
Referee: Costas Nicolaou (Cyprus), Hikmat Qafarli (Azerbaijan)
30 January 2019
18:00 (19:00 EET)

Netherlands	4–1	Estonia
Velseboer 6:01, 34:28, 36:09; Zerouali 24:05	Report	Stüf 5:35

Palace of Culture and Sports, Varna
Referee: Javier Moreno Reina (Spain), Daniele D'adamo (San Marino)

31 January 2019
15:45 (16:45 EET)

Bulgaria	3–2	Estonia
Baharov 27:08; Tsvetanov 32:19, 38:49	Report	Titenok 5:51; Kostin 30:37

Palace of Culture and Sports, Varna
Referee: Daniele D'adamo (San Marino), Costas Nicolaou (Cyprus)
31 January 2019
18:00 (19:00 EET)

Montenegro	2–4	Netherlands
Bajović 20:15; Jakovljević 36:01	Report	Velseboer 5:33, 12:56; St Juste 32:07; Bouzambou 33:59

Palace of Culture and Sports, Varna
Referee: Hikmat Qafarli (Azerbaijan), Javier Moreno Reina (Spain)

2 February 2019
15:45 (16:45 EET)

Estonia	0–4	Montenegro
	Report	Mugoša 20:13; Obradović 25:12; Barović 31:47; Ćorović 33:15

Palace of Culture and Sports, Varna
Referee: Daniele D'adamo (San Marino), Hikmat Qafarli (Azerbaijan)
2 February 2019
18:00 (19:00 EET)

Netherlands	6–1	Bulgaria
Bouzambou 4:07, 16:59 (pen.); St Juste 5:01, 36:31; Velseboer 19:00; Bouraaraassi 36:54	Report	Nestorov 26:43

Palace of Culture and Sports, Varna
Referee: Javier Moreno Reina (Spain), Costas Nicolaou (Cyprus)

=== Group H ===
Pos	Team	Pld	W	D	L	GF	GA	GD	Pts	Qualification
1	Moldova (H)	3	3	0	0	23	8	+15	9	Main round
2	Finland	3	2	0	1	17	3	+14	6	Main round
3	Wales	3	1	0	2	7	17	−10	3	
4	Northern Ireland	3	0	0	3	6	25	−19	0	

Source: UEFA
Rules for classification: Tiebreakers
(H) Hosts
30 January 2019
17:30 (18:30 EET)

Moldova	8–4	Wales
Obadă 13:38, 20:21, 39:59; Munteanu 22:15; Laşcu 25:04; Negara 26:50; Tacot 28:57; Anton 38:20	Report	Hugh 10:44; Arsan 30:33; Davies 38:02; Orme 38:54

FMF Futsal Arena, Ciorescu
Referee: Grigori Zelentsov (Russia), Dejan Veselic (Slovenia)
30 January 2019
20:00 (16:00 EET)

Finland	9–1	Northern Ireland
Korpela 1:45, 34:49; Junno 6:47; Korsunov 7:39; Autio 19:47; J. Kytölä 28:30, 34:11; Hosio 30:44; Gunn 31:20 (o.g.)	Report	Millar 12:23

FMF Futsal Arena, Ciorescu
Referee: Josip Barton (Macedonia), Norbert Szilágyi (Hungary)

31 January 2019
15:00 (16:00 EET)

Wales	0–7	Finland
	Report	Kylmälä 8:00; Autio 17:16; Korpela 22:57; Korsunov 27:06; Hosio 27:55; J. Kytölä 32:38; Jyrkiäinen 36:20

FMF Futsal Arena, Ciorescu
Referee: Dejan Veselic (Slovenia), Josip Barton (Macedonia)
31 January 2019
17:30 (18:30 EET)

Moldova	13–3	Northern Ireland
Tacot 1:52, 12:20, 38:26; Obadă 2:31, 8:13, 33:04; Negara 14:22, 39:28; Nicolaiciuc 14:41, 29:45, 36:34; Laşcu 19:59 (pen.), 22:22	Report	Gunn 4:09; Millar 29:52, 39:57

FMF Futsal Arena, Ciorescu
Referee: Norbert Szilágyi (Hungary), Grigori Zelentsov (Russia)

2 February 2019
14:30 (15:30 EET)

Northern Ireland	2–3	Wales
Glenholmes 12:37; Gibson 38:06	Report	Arsan 1:38; Hugh 31:12; Pritchard 35:04

FMF Futsal Arena, Ciorescu
Referee: Norbert Szilágyi (Hungary), Josip Barton (Macedonia)
2 February 2019
17:00 (18:00 EET)

Finland	1–2	Moldova
Jyrkiäinen 22:54	Report	Laşcu 9:24; Tacot 22:10

FMF Futsal Arena, Ciorescu
Referee: Dejan Veselic (Slovenia), Grigori Zelentsov (Russia)

== Main round ==
The winners and runners-up of each group advanced to the elite round. The main round was scheduled to be played between 22 and 27 October 2019.

Times up to 26 October 2019 are CEST (UTC+2), thereafter times are CET (UTC+1), as listed by UEFA (local times, if different, are in parentheses).

=== Group 1 ===
Pos	Team	Pld	W	D	L	GF	GA	GD	Pts	Qualification
1	Spain	3	3	0	0	11	4	+7	9	Elite round
2	Finland	3	2	0	1	8	7	+1	6	Elite round
3	Georgia	3	1	0	2	7	10	−3	3	
4	Poland (H)	3	0	0	3	4	9	−5	0	

Source: UEFA
Rules for classification: Tiebreakers
(H) Hosts
24 October 2019
17:00

Spain	4–1	Finland
Rafa Usín 14:05; Raúl Campos 17:32; Boyis 18:33; Juan Emilio 26:04	Report	Autio 3:09

CRS Hall Zielona Góra, Zielona Góra
Referee: Dario Pezzuto (Italy), Cédric Pelissier (France)
24 October 2019
20:00

Poland	2–3	Georgia
Łopuch 11:56; Zastawnik 15:30 (pen.)	Report	Thales 8:12, 23:00 (pen.); Fumaça 21:50

CRS Hall Zielona Góra, Zielona Góra
Referee: Josip Barton (Macedonia), Farik Keco (Bosnia and Herzegovina)

25 October 2019
17:00

Georgia	2–3	Spain
Sebiskveradze 30:33; Todua 32:07	Report	Fernan 12:53; Raúl Campos 25:17; Tolrà 36:32

CRS Hall Zielona Góra, Zielona Góra
Referee: Farik Keco (Bosnia and Herzegovina), Josip Barton (Macedonia)
25 October 2019
20:00

Poland	1–2	Finland
Leszczak 27:56	Report	Hosio 30:44; J. Kytölä 33:03

CRS Hall Zielona Góra, Zielona Góra
Referee: Cédric Pelissier (France), Dario Pezzuto (Italy)

27 October 2019
17:00

Finland	5–2	Georgia
Jyrkiäinen 8:56; Tophuria 18:53 (o.g.); Hosio 35:36; Autio 38:35 (2pen.); Savolainen 39:17	Report	Sebiskveradze 11:38, 26:41

CRS Hall Zielona Góra, Zielona Góra
Referee: Cédric Pelissier (France), Josip Barton (Macedonia)
27 October 2019
20:00

Spain	4–1	Poland
Lin 7:25, 21:13; Solano 17:43; Bebe 24:51	Report	Zastawnik 5:20

CRS Hall Zielona Góra, Zielona Góra
Referee: Dario Pezzuto (Italy), Farik Keco (Bosnia and Herzegovina)

=== Group 2 ===
Note: Ukraine were originally to host.

Pos	Team	Pld	W	D	L	GF	GA	GD	Pts	Qualification
1	Slovenia	3	2	1	0	15	4	+11	7	Elite round
2	Ukraine	3	2	1	0	14	4	+10	7	Elite round
3	Kosovo	3	1	0	2	9	19	−10	3	
4	North Macedonia (H)	3	0	0	3	7	18	−11	0	

Source: UEFA
Rules for classification: Tiebreakers
(H) Hosts
24 October 2019
17:30

Ukraine	7–1	Kosovo
Fareniuk 11:53; Shoturma 17:20; Sorokin 22:41, 27:38, 32:08; Zvarych 24:36; Korolyshyn 33:10	Report	Rukovci 11:12

Jane Sandanski Arena, Skopje
Referee: Marc Birkett (England), Julien Lang (France)
24 October 2019
20:00

North Macedonia	1–6	Slovenia
Micevski 7:08	Report	Osredkar 12:51; Zajc 13:41; Čujec 20:32; Fideršek 23:20; Čeh 30:46 (2pen.), 33:39 (2pen.)

Jane Sandanski Arena, Skopje
Referee: Gerd Bylois (Belgium), Daniel Matkovic (Switzerland)

25 October 2019
17:30

North Macedonia	5–7	Kosovo
Krstevski 3:28; Ismaili 15:25; Ziberi 21:01; Agushi 25:45; Micevski 27:29	Report	Rukovci 1:35; Maxharraj 3:56; Alaj 12:04; Qerimi 19:58, 38:43; Prenqi 33:16; Topilla 39:16

Jane Sandanski Arena, Skopje
Referee: Daniel Matkovic (Switzerland), Marc Birkett (England)
25 October 2019
20:00

Slovenia	2–2	Ukraine
Čujec 16:58; Mordej 33:11	Report	Shoturma 21:28; Mykytiuk 29:52 (pen.)

Jane Sandanski Arena, Skopje
Referee: Julien Lang (France), Gerd Bylois (Belgium)

27 October 2019
17:30

Ukraine	5–1	North Macedonia
Mykytiuk 5:05, 19:41; Razuvanov 6:24; Zvarych 8:58; Malyshko 30:01	Report	Leveski 33:56

Jane Sandanski Arena, Skopje
Referee: Gerd Bylois (Belgium), Marc Birkett (England)
27 October 2019
20:00

Kosovo	1–7	Slovenia
Maxharraj 3:33	Report	Osredkar 18:38, 27:25; Čujec 23:00, 36:00; Mordej 25:23; Čeh 34:20 (2pen.); Turk 39:11

Jane Sandanski Arena, Skopje
Referee: Julien Lang (France), Daniel Matkovic (Switzerland)

=== Group 3 ===
Pos	Team	Pld	W	D	L	GF	GA	GD	Pts	Qualification
1	Azerbaijan (H)	3	3	0	0	8	3	+5	9	Elite round
2	Slovakia	3	2	0	1	12	6	+6	6	Elite round
3	Montenegro	3	1	0	2	6	11	−5	3	
4	Moldova	3	0	0	3	8	14	−6	0	

Source: UEFA
Rules for classification: Tiebreakers
(H) Hosts
23 October 2019
15:00 (17:00 AZT)

Slovakia	5–0	Montenegro
Kozár 4:01; Rafaj 22:20; Drahovský 33:45, 39:59; Rick 39:22	Report

Baku Sports Palace, Baku
Referee: Miguel Castilho (Portugal), Ingo Heemsoth (Germany)
23 October 2019
18:00 (20:00 AZT)

Azerbaijan	3–1	Moldova
Bolinha 11:38, 34:40; Vassoura 32:49	Report	Laşcu 7:15

Baku Sports Palace, Baku
Referee: Ondřej Černý (Czech Republic), Ingus Puriņš (Latvia)

24 October 2019
15:00 (17:00 AZT)

Moldova	4–7	Slovakia
Doša 7:37 (o.g.); Tacot 14:25; Negara 30:17, 35:46	Report	Směřička 9:25; Drahovský 10:17, 12:25, 23:56; Kyjovský 25:34; Rick 27:54; Kozár 31:38

Baku Sports Palace, Baku
Referee: Ingus Puriņš (Latvia), Miguel Castilho (Portugal)
24 October 2019
18:00 (20:00 AZT)

Azerbaijan	3–2	Montenegro
Bolinha 4:09; Chovdarov 21:49; Shojaei 33:33	Report	Perošević 7:15; Obradović 9:22

Baku Sports Palace, Baku
Referee: Ingo Heemsoth (Germany), Ondřej Černý (Czech Republic)

26 October 2019
15:00 (17:00 AZT)

Montenegro	4–3	Moldova
Ćorović 3:00, 34:04; Vuletić 25:52; Ţîmbalist 38:04 (o.g.)	Report	Negara 7:50; Obadă 9:27; Burdujel 35:07

Baku Sports Palace, Baku
Referee: Miguel Castilho (Portugal), Ingo Heemsoth (Germany)
26 October 2019
18:00 (20:00 AZT)

Slovakia	0–2	Azerbaijan
	Report	Bolinha 29:21; Vassoura 34:38

Baku Sports Palace, Baku
Referee: Ondřej Černý (Czech Republic), Ingus Puriņš (Latvia)

=== Group 4 ===
Pos	Team	Pld	W	D	L	GF	GA	GD	Pts	Qualification
1	Italy (H)	3	2	1	0	11	5	+6	7	Elite round
2	Belarus	3	2	1	0	10	5	+5	7	Elite round
3	Hungary	3	1	0	2	4	6	−2	3	
4	England	3	0	0	3	3	12	−9	0	

Source: UEFA
Rules for classification: Tiebreakers
(H) Hosts
24 October 2019
17:00

Hungary	3–0	England
Nagy 1:11; Horváth 9:10; Dróth 37:50	Report

PalaSele, Eboli
Referee: Cristiano José Cardoso Santos (Portugal), Antonios Adamopoulos (Greece)
24 October 2019
20:30

Italy	3–3	Belarus
Musumeci 13:31; Alex Merlim 30:17, 39:39	Report	Krikun 0:47; Matveenko 5:06; Olshevski 8:32

PalaSele, Eboli
Referee: Saša Tomić (Croatia), Costas Nicolaou (Cyprus)

25 October 2019
16:00

Belarus	2–0	Hungary
Zhigalko 27:55; Rogovik 37:33	Report

PalaSele, Eboli
Referee: Antonios Adamopoulos (Greece), Saša Tomić (Croatia)
25 October 2019
19:00

Italy	4–1	England
Alex Merlim 21:34, 23:04; De Lucca 34:57; Mammarella 39:35	Report	Rexha 38:40 (pen.)

PalaSele, Eboli
Referee: Costas Nicolaou (Cyprus), Cristiano José Cardoso Santos (Portugal)

27 October 2019
16:00

Hungary	1–4	Italy
Dróth 29:24	Report	Canal 12:30, 35:31; Marcelinho 18:58; Romano 30:56

PalaSele, Eboli
Referee: Saša Tomić (Croatia), Cristiano José Cardoso Santos (Portugal)
27 October 2019
19:00

England	2–5	Belarus
Bettson 39:16; Rexha 39:52	Report	Rogovik 12:38; Zhigalko 15:22; Krikun 23:16; Gusakov 39:25, 39:38

PalaSele, Eboli
Referee: Costas Nicolaou (Cyprus), Antonios Adamopoulos (Greece)

=== Group 5 ===
Pos	Team	Pld	W	D	L	GF	GA	GD	Pts	Qualification
1	Kazakhstan	3	3	0	0	13	2	+11	9	Elite round
2	Romania (H)	3	1	1	1	6	6	0	4	Elite round
3	Netherlands	3	0	2	1	5	10	−5	2	
4	Albania	3	0	1	2	5	11	−6	1	

Source: UEFA
Rules for classification: Tiebreakers
(H) Hosts
23 October 2019
15:30 (16:30 EEST)

Kazakhstan	4–0	Albania
Akbalikov 5:15; Taynan 25:19; Douglas Júnior 30:18; Tursagulov 36:41	Report

Polyvalent Hall, Piatra Neamț
Referee: Vitali Rakutski (Belarus), Yevhen Hordiienko (Ukraine)
23 October 2019
18:00 (19:00 EEST)

Romania	1–1	Netherlands
Stoica 8:51	Report	Velseboer 4:54

Polyvalent Hall, Piatra Neamț
Referee: Angelo Galante (Italy), Fredric Nilholt (Sweden)

24 October 2019
15:30 (16:30 EEST)

Netherlands	0–5	Kazakhstan
	Report	Douglas Júnior 0:22, 20:27, 34:43; Higuita 14:29; Knaub 39:56

Polyvalent Hall, Piatra Neamț
Referee: Fredric Nilholt (Sweden), Vitali Rakutski (Belarus)
24 October 2019
18:00 (19:00 EEST)

Romania	3–1	Albania
Paulo Ferreira 1:39; Szöcs 13:00; Matei 19:19	Report	Brahimi 30:21

Polyvalent Hall, Piatra Neamț
Referee: Yevhen Hordiienko (Ukraine), Angelo Galante (Italy)

26 October 2019
15:30 (16:30 EEST)

Albania	4–4	Netherlands
Alimi 25:42; Kaca 29:49; Alibegu 39:20; Mejzini 39:40	Report	Makraou 5:23, 16:12; Jordany 8:14; Velseboer 33:01

Polyvalent Hall, Piatra Neamț
Referee: Yevhen Hordiienko (Ukraine), Fredric Nilholt (Sweden)
26 October 2019
18:00 (19:00 EEST)

Kazakhstan	4–2	Romania
Taynan 5:45, 29:18, 39:31; Orazov 29:46	Report	Valadares 0:20; Matei 3:29

Polyvalent Hall, Piatra Neamț
Referee: Angelo Galante (Italy), Vitali Rakutski (Belarus)

=== Group 6 ===
Pos	Team	Pld	W	D	L	GF	GA	GD	Pts	Qualification
1	Serbia	3	3	0	0	14	5	+9	9	Elite round
2	France (H)	3	2	0	1	12	9	+3	6	Elite round
3	Belgium	3	1	0	2	13	10	+3	3	
4	Switzerland	3	0	0	3	4	19	−15	0	

Source: UEFA
Rules for classification: Tiebreakers
(H) Hosts
23 October 2019
17:00

Serbia	7–0	Switzerland
Petrov 12:55, 14:29; Simić 15:20; Lazarević 16:00; Vukadinović 23:49; Radovanović 27:07; Ramić 32:51	Report

Aren'ice, Cergy
Referee: Tomasz Frak (Poland), Sarunas Tamulynas (Lithuania)
23 October 2019
20:00

France	5–3	Belgium
Alla 6:27, 29:11; Belhaj 17:19; Ramirez 34:06; Mohammed 35:54	Report	Ghislandi 33:54; Adnane 37:31; Ramirez 38:50 (o.g.)

Aren'ice, Cergy
Referee: Juan José Cordero Gallardo (Spain), Iurii Neverov (Russia)

24 October 2019
17:00

Belgium	1–2	Serbia
Dujacquier 37:58 (2pen.)	Report	Pršić 0:30; Rakić 38:53

Aren'ice, Cergy
Referee: Sarunas Tamulynas (Lithuania), Juan José Cordero Gallardo (Spain)
24 October 2019
20:00

France	3–1	Switzerland
Kebe 6:17; Mohammed 16:46; Mouhoudine 33:54	Report	Facchinetti 39:43

Aren'ice, Cergy
Referee: Iurii Neverov (Russia), Tomasz Frak (Poland)

26 October 2019
17:00

Switzerland	3–9	Belgium
Facchinetti 5:10, 38:22; Buckson 32:17	Report	Ettalaki 8:17, 35:31; Dujacquier 18:23; Rahou 22:23, 39:03; Adnane 30:51; Ouadi 31:51, 32:55, 39:22

Aren'ice, Cergy
Referee: Iurii Neverov (Russia), Sarunas Tamulynas (Lithuania)
26 October 2019
20:00

Serbia	5–4	France
Lazarević 4:24; Rakić 9:59, 23:31 (pen.); Tomić 22:07; Momčilović 39:52	Report	Soumaré 22:36; Kebe 23:51; Ramirez 33:56, 34:50

Aren'ice, Cergy
Referee: Juan José Cordero Gallardo (Spain), Tomasz Frak (Poland)

=== Group 7 ===
Pos	Team	Pld	W	D	L	GF	GA	GD	Pts	Qualification
1	Russia	3	2	1	0	13	7	+6	7	Elite round
2	Croatia (H)	3	2	1	0	9	3	+6	7	Elite round
3	Bosnia and Herzegovina	3	1	0	2	8	11	−3	3	
4	Sweden	3	0	0	3	7	16	−9	0	

Source: UEFA
Rules for classification: Tiebreakers
(H) Hosts
23 October 2019
17:00

Russia	7–3	Sweden
Kotlyarov 4:59, 12:26; Rômulo 8:16; Niyazov 8:45; Kudziev 9:24; Asadov 20:44; Antoshkin 28:03	Report	Zhubi 0:19, 19:43; Hiseni 38:26

Športska dvorana Gospino polje, Dubrovnik
Referee: Borislav Kolev (Bulgaria), Radim Cep (Czech Republic)
23 October 2019
20:00

Croatia	4–0	Bosnia and Herzegovina
L. Suton 7:44, 22:01, 22:26; Jelovčić 17:49	Report

Športska dvorana Gospino polje, Dubrovnik
Referee: Kamil Çetin (Turkey), Adrian Tschopp (Switzerland)

24 October 2019
17:00

Bosnia and Herzegovina	2–4	Russia
Ivanković 22:44; Milanović 35:53	Report	Antoshkin 14:14; Kudziev 18:34; Asadov 29:04; Demin 33:00

Športska dvorana Gospino polje, Dubrovnik
Referee: Radim Cep (Czech Republic), Kamil Çetin (Turkey)
24 October 2019
20:00

Croatia	3–1	Sweden
Kanjuh 8:30; Novak 33:28; Perišić 35:03	Report	Legiec 17:03

Športska dvorana Gospino polje, Dubrovnik
Referee: Adrian Tschopp (Switzerland), Borislav Kolev (Bulgaria)

26 October 2019
17:00

Sweden	3–6	Bosnia and Herzegovina
Smajlovic 32:50, 39:24; Kadivar 38:20	Report	Radmilović 1:22; Kahvedžić 12:01; Perković 19:14, 39:32; Bošković 34:03, 37:13

Športska dvorana Gospino polje, Dubrovnik
Referee: Radim Cep (Czech Republic), Adrian Tschopp (Switzerland)
26 October 2019
20:00

Russia	2–2	Croatia
Davydov 11:03; Asadov 12:56	Report	Jelovčić 19:19; Novak 38:48

Športska dvorana Gospino polje, Dubrovnik
Referee: Borislav Kolev (Bulgaria), Kamil Çetin (Turkey)

=== Group 8 ===
Pos	Team	Pld	W	D	L	GF	GA	GD	Pts	Qualification
1	Portugal (H)	3	3	0	0	13	1	+12	9	Elite round
2	Czech Republic	3	2	0	1	11	5	+6	6	Elite round
3	Latvia	3	1	0	2	8	13	−5	3	
4	Germany	3	0	0	3	2	15	−13	0	

Source: UEFA
Rules for classification: Tiebreakers
(H) Hosts
24 October 2019
19:00 (18:00 WEST)

Czech Republic	3–0	Germany
Vnuk 9:05; Holý 9:56; Záruba 37:02	Report

Pavilhão Multiusos de Viseu, Viseu
Referee: Vladimir Kadykov (Russia), Vladan Radulović (Serbia)
24 October 2019
22:00 (21:00 WEST)

Portugal	4–0	Latvia
Cardinal 5:33; Pedro Cary 7:09; Márcio Moreira 31:43; Bruno Coelho 38:38	Report

Pavilhão Multiusos de Viseu, Viseu
Referee: Admir Zahovič (Slovenia), Idan Berenshtein (Israel)

25 October 2019
19:00 (18:00 WEST)

Latvia	1–7	Czech Republic
Baklanovs 32:33	Report	Holý 0:21; Seidler 16:36, 35:14; Rešetár 26:56, 31:41; Koudelka 32:21; Slováček 35:27

Pavilhão Multiusos de Viseu, Viseu
Referee: Idan Berenshtein (Israel), Vladimir Kadykov (Russia)
25 October 2019
22:00 (21:00 WEST)

Portugal	5–0	Germany
Fábio Cecílio 15:29; Pedro Cary 16:23; Cardinal 23:30, 38:50, 39:19	Report

Pavilhão Multiusos de Viseu, Viseu
Referee: Vladan Radulović (Serbia), Admir Zahovič (Slovenia)

27 October 2019
16:00 (15:00 WET)

Germany	2–7	Latvia
Wittig 35:51, 36:52	Report	Jerofejevs 2:44; Baklanovs 9:01; Strazdiņš 13:48; Koļesņikovs 22:23; Matjušenko 25:14, 39:24; Halimons 26:23

Pavilhão Multiusos de Viseu, Viseu
Referee: Vladan Radulović (Serbia), Idan Berenshtein (Israel)
27 October 2019
19:00 (18:00 WET)

Czech Republic	1–4	Portugal
Seidler 14:45	Report	Bruno Coelho 11:21; Ricardinho 17:59, 39:56; Pany Varela 33:48

Pavilhão Multiusos de Viseu, Viseu
Referee: Admir Zahovič (Slovenia), Vladimir Kadykov (Russia)

== Elite round ==
The draws for the elite round and play-offs were held on 7 November 2019, 14:15 CET (UTC+1), at the UEFA headquarters in Nyon, Switzerland. For the elite round, the 16 teams were drawn into four groups of four, containing one best-four ranked main round group winner according to the coefficient ranking (seeding position 1), one other main round group winner (seeding position 2), and two main round group runners-up (seeding positions 3 or 4). First, a draw was held to select the four hosts from the seven potential hosts, which were allocated to their respective group as per their seeding positions. Next, the remaining 12 teams (including potential hosts not selected) were drawn from their respective pot which were allocated according to their seeding positions (group runners-up, including hosts, were allocated to first seeding position 4, then seeding position 3). Teams from the same main round group could be drawn in the same group. Based on the decisions taken by the UEFA Emergency Panel, Russia and Ukraine could not be drawn in the same group.

Legend

- (Rank): Coefficient ranking for seeding
- (H): Elite round hosts selected by draw
- (h): Potential elite round hosts not selected by draw

Advanced from main round
Group	Winners	Runners-up
Seed	Seeding position 1 (best-four ranked)	Seeding position 3 or 4
Seed	Seeding position 2 (others)	Seeding position 3 or 4
1	Spain (2) (h)	Finland (23)
2	Slovenia (9)	Ukraine (5) (h)
3	Azerbaijan (6)	Slovakia (16)
4	Italy (7)	Belarus (17)
5	Kazakhstan (4)	Romania (13)
6	Serbia (8) (H)	France (15)
7	Russia (1) (h)	Croatia (10) (H)
8	Portugal (3) (H)	Czech Republic (12) (H)

For the play-offs, the four elite round group runners-up, whose identity was not known at the time of the draw, were drawn into two ties without any seeding. As Russia and Ukraine could not play against each other, if such a tie occur in the play-offs after the completion of the elite round, the second teams drawn in the two ties (who play the first leg away) would be swapped.

The winners of each group qualified for the 2021 FIFA Futsal World Cup, while the runners-up of each group advanced to the play-offs. The elite round was scheduled to be played between 27 January and 5 February 2020.

Times are CET (UTC+1), as listed by UEFA (local times, if different, are in parentheses).

=== Group A ===
Pos	Team	Pld	W	D	L	GF	GA	GD	Pts	Qualification
1	Portugal (H)	3	2	1	0	8	4	+4	7	2021 FIFA Futsal World Cup
2	Finland	3	1	2	0	8	6	+2	5	Play-offs
3	Italy	3	1	1	1	8	9	−1	4	
4	Belarus	3	0	0	3	6	11	−5	0	

Source: UEFA
Rules for classification: Tiebreakers
(H) Hosts
30 January 2020
18:30 (17:30 WET)

Italy	2–2	Finland
J. Kytölä 13:12 (o.g.); Marcelinho 17:14 (2pen.)	Report	Hosio 7:15; Junno 19:27

Póvoa de Varzim Municipal Hall, Póvoa de Varzim
Referee: Alejandro Martinez Flores (Spain), David Urdanoz Apezteguia (Spain)
30 January 2020
21:30 (20:30 WET)

Portugal	2–1	Belarus
Cardinal 27:23; Tiago Brito 32:00	Report	Rogovik 19:11

Póvoa de Varzim Municipal Hall, Póvoa de Varzim
Referee: Juan José Cordero Gallardo (Spain), Javier Moreno Reina (Spain)

31 January 2020
18:30 (17:30 WET)

Belarus	3–5	Italy
Zharikov 9:46; Selyuk 25:18; Zhigalko 39:54	Report	De Oliveira 5:49, 15:29; Murilo 8:34, 37:18; Mello Rossi 17:23

Póvoa de Varzim Municipal Hall, Póvoa de Varzim
Referee: David Urdanoz Apezteguia (Spain), Alejandro Martinez Flores (Spain)
31 January 2020
21:30 (20:30 WET)

Portugal	2–2	Finland
Bruno Coelho 38:11 (2pen.); Cardinal 39:12	Report	Jyrkiäinen 15:40; Hosio 28:51

Póvoa de Varzim Municipal Hall, Póvoa de Varzim
Referee: Javier Moreno Reina (Spain), Juan José Cordero Gallardo (Spain)

2 February 2020
15:00 (14:00 WET)

Finland	4–2	Belarus
Teittinen 15:39; Junno 18:28 (2pen.), 30:02; Jyrkiäinenn 24:03	Report	Gorbenko 14:53; Zhigalko 32:06

Póvoa de Varzim Municipal Hall, Póvoa de Varzim
Referee: Alejandro Martinez Flores (Spain), Juan José Cordero Gallardo (Spain)
2 February 2020
18:00 (17:00 WET)

Italy	1–4	Portugal
Romano 39:48	Report	Fábio Cecílio 10:20; Pany Varela 16:05; Ricardinho 39:14, 39:37

Póvoa de Varzim Municipal Hall, Póvoa de Varzim
Referee: David Urdanoz Apezteguia (Spain), Javier Moreno Reina (Spain)

=== Group B ===
Pos	Team	Pld	W	D	L	GF	GA	GD	Pts	Qualification
1	Spain	3	3	0	0	11	3	+8	9	2021 FIFA Futsal World Cup
2	Serbia (H)	3	2	0	1	10	9	+1	6	Play-offs
3	France	3	0	1	2	5	9	−4	1	
4	Ukraine	3	0	1	2	5	10	−5	1	

Source: UEFA
Rules for classification: Tiebreakers
(H) Hosts
1 February 2020
16:30

Serbia	5–2	Ukraine
Pršić 11:54, 21:34; Petrov 14:22; Tomić 29:27; Rakić 30:36	Report	Fareniuk 29:39; Korsun 38:16

Čair Sports Center, Niš
Referee: Miguel Castilho (Portugal), Filipe Gonçalo Santos Duarte (Portugal)
1 February 2020
20:30

Spain	3–1	France
Solano 24:26; Bebe 30:56; Raúl Campos 37:34	Report	Alla 37:50

Čair Sports Center, Niš
Referee: Eduardo Fernandes Coelho (Portugal), Cristiano José Cardoso Santos (Portugal)

2 February 2020
16:30

Serbia	4–2	France
Rakić 6:20; Simić 28:04; Tomić 32:17; Aleksić 39:51	Report	Lutin 2:06; Ramirez 22:51

Čair Sports Center, Niš
Referee: Filipe Gonçalo Santos Duarte (Portugal), Eduardo Fernandes Coelho (Portugal)
2 February 2020
20:30

Ukraine	1–3	Spain
Malyshko 30:08	Report	Ortiz 0:40 (pen.); Lozano 18:14 (2pen.), 32:25

Čair Sports Center, Niš
Referee: Cristiano José Cardoso Santos (Portugal), Miguel Castilho (Portugal)

4 February 2020
16:30

France	2–2	Ukraine
Mouhoudine 9:35; Ramirez 12:26 (pen.)	Report	Zhurba 6:27; Pediash 28:18

Čair Sports Center, Niš
Referee: Cristiano José Cardoso Santos (Portugal), Filipe Gonçalo Santos Duarte (Portugal)
4 February 2020
20:30

Spain	5–1	Serbia
Bebe 3:18, 33:11; Gómez 6:25; Adolfo 36:30, 38:11	Report	Pršić 26:39 (pen.)

Čair Sports Center, Niš
Referee: Eduardo Fernandes Coelho (Portugal), Miguel Castilho (Portugal)

=== Group C ===
Pos	Team	Pld	W	D	L	GF	GA	GD	Pts	Qualification
1	Russia	3	2	0	1	14	8	+6	6 (Note: Ranked on head-to-head points: Russia 3, Croatia 0.)	2021 FIFA Futsal World Cup
2	Croatia (H)	3	2	0	1	8	6	+2	6	Play-offs
3	Azerbaijan	3	1	1	1	7	8	−1	4	
4	Slovakia	3	0	1	2	6	13	−7	1	

Source: UEFA
Rules for classification: Tiebreakers
(H) Hosts
Notes:
29 January 2020
17:00

Russia	7–1	Slovakia
Antoshkin 4:51, 32:52; Davydov 9:40; Robinho 14:37; Éder Lima 21:38, 29:46; Niyazov 28:53	Report	Drahovský 15:39

Gradski vrt Hall, Osijek
Attendance: 150
Referee: Chiara Perona (Italy), Alessandro Malfer (Italy)
29 January 2020
20:00

Croatia	2–0	Azerbaijan
Perić 3:02; Jelovčić 37:40	Report

Gradski vrt Hall, Osijek
Attendance: 700
Referee: Angelo Galante (Italy), Nicola Manzione (Italy)

30 January 2020
17:00

Azerbaijan	4–3	Russia
Vilela 1:44; Everton Cardoso 33:31, 39:24; Atayev 36:45	Report	Rômulo 15:28; Davydov 17:19; Antoshkin 39:40

Gradski vrt Hall, Osijek
Referee: Alessandro Malfer (Italy), Angelo Galante (Italy)
30 January 2020
20:00

Croatia	3–2	Slovakia
Kanjuh 7:52; Jelovčić 30:52; Novak 38:23 (pen.)	Report	Zdráhal 29:06; Kozár 31:23

Gradski vrt Hall, Osijek
Referee: Nicola Manzione (Italy), Chiara Perona (Italy)

1 February 2020
17:00

Slovakia	3–3	Azerbaijan
Hudek 8:10; Ševčík 30:42; Kyjovský 39:50	Report	Vilela 16:21; Kyjovský 28:51 (o.g.); Bolinha 39:57

Gradski vrt Hall, Osijek
Referee: Angelo Galante (Italy), Chiara Perona (Italy)
1 February 2020
20:00

Russia	4–3	Croatia
Éder Lima 6:38, 16:50; L. Suton 17:01 (o.g.); Rômulo 38:58	Report	Bajrušović 15:24; Matošević 32:32, 39:26

Gradski vrt Hall, Osijek
Referee: Alessandro Malfer (Italy), Nicola Manzione (Italy)

=== Group D ===
Pos	Team	Pld	W	D	L	GF	GA	GD	Pts	Qualification
1	Kazakhstan	3	2	0	1	10	8	+2	6 (Note: Ranked on head-to-head points: Kazakhstan 3, Czech Republic 0.)	2021 FIFA Futsal World Cup
2	Czech Republic (H)	3	2	0	1	9	6	+3	6	Play-offs
3	Romania	3	1	1	1	7	9	−2	4	
4	Slovenia	3	0	1	2	8	11	−3	1	

Source: UEFA
Rules for classification: Tiebreakers
(H) Hosts
Notes:
2 February 2020
18:00

Czech Republic	3–1	Slovenia
Holý 9:19; Vnuk 18:16; Koudelka 37:49 (pen.)	Report	Fideršek 34:53

Sportovní hala Vodova, Brno
Referee: Ivan Shabanov (Russia), Iurii Neverov (Russia)
2 February 2020
21:00

Kazakhstan	1–3	Romania
Higuita 38:53	Report	Stoica 1:30; Valadares 32:42; Toniţă 33:13

Sportovní hala Vodova, Brno
Referee: Vladimir Kadykov (Russia), Irina Velikanova (Russia)

3 February 2020
18:00

Czech Republic	4–0	Romania
Seidler 0:38, 38:34 (2pen.); Holý 20:36; Koudelka 35:29	Report

Sportovní hala Vodova, Brno
Referee: Irina Velikanova (Russia), Ivan Shabanov (Russia)
3 February 2020
21:00

Slovenia	3–4	Kazakhstan
Fideršek 27:06; Fetić 30:09; Čujec 33:40	Report	Akbalykov 17:58; Douglas Júnior 31:48; Leo 37:07; Tursagulov 39:25

Sportovní hala Vodova, Brno
Referee: Iurii Neverov (Russia), Vladimir Kadykov (Russia)

5 February 2020
15:00

Romania	4–4	Slovenia
Matei 10:06, 18:22 (2pen.), 27:42; Toniţă 37:14	Report	Čeh 16:19; Čujec 37:16; Hozjan 39:36; Turk 39:44

Sportovní hala Vodova, Brno
Referee: Vladimir Kadykov (Russia), Ivan Shabanov (Russia)
5 February 2020
18:00

Kazakhstan	5–2	Czech Republic
Douglas Júnior 2:38, 3:43, 22:34; Taynan 3:55, 37:57	Report	Holý 35:42; Vokoun 39:32

Sportovní hala Vodova, Brno
Referee: Irina Velikanova (Russia), Iurii Neverov (Russia)

== Play-offs ==
The winners of each tie qualify for the 2021 FIFA Futsal World Cup. The play-offs were originally scheduled to be played on 9 and 12 April 2020, but had been postponed due to the COVID-19 pandemic, initially to a later date tentatively between June and mid-August. On 17 June 2020, UEFA announced that the matches had been rescheduled to be played between 2 and 11 November 2020.

Team 1	Agg.	Team 2	1st leg	2nd leg
Croatia	4–4 (5–6 p)	Czech Republic	2–2	2–2 (a.e.t.)
Serbia	6–5	Finland	1–0	5–5

Times are CET (UTC+1), as listed by UEFA (local times, if different, are in parentheses).

7 November 2020
19:00

Croatia	2–2	Czech Republic
Novak 19:26 (2pen.); Djuraš 26:25	Report	Záruba 9:20; Rešetár 11:14

Krešimir Ćosić Hall, Zadar
Referee: Juan José Cordero Gallardo (Spain), Alejandro Martínez Flores (Spain)
10 November 2020
18:10

Czech Republic	2–2 (a.e.t.)	Croatia
Holý 6:52; Záruba 19:24	Report	Novak 3:33; Matošević 16:53
Penalties
Koudelka (penalty scored); Vnuk (penalty scored); Holý (penalty scored); Záruba (penalty missed); Seidler (penalty scored); Křivanek (penalty missed); Slováček (penalty scored); Vokoun (penalty scored)	6–5	(penalty scored) Marinović; (penalty scored) Jelovčić; (penalty scored) J. Suton; (penalty scored) Perić; (penalty missed) Kanjuh; (penalty missed) Horvat; (penalty scored) Djuraš; (penalty missed) Matošević

Sportovní hala Vodova, Brno
Referee: Cédric Pelissier (France), Victor Berg-Audic (France)

4–4 on aggregate. The Czech Republic won 6–5 on penalties and qualified for the 2021 FIFA Futsal World Cup.

6 November 2020
18:00

Serbia	1–0	Finland
Pršić 28:09	Report

Jezero Hall, Kragujevac
Referee: Eduardo Fernandes Coelho (Portugal), Cristiano José Cardoso Santos (Portugal)
9 December 2020 (Note: The second leg match between Finland and Serbia was originally scheduled to be played on 10 November, 19:00 EET, at Energia Areena, Vantaa, but was postponed due to members of the Finland team testing positive for the COVID-19 virus which required both teams to be quarantined. It was rescheduled to 9 December 2020.)
17:15 (18:15 EET)

Finland	5–5	Serbia
Pikkarainen 3:19; Autio 10:02, 31:28; Grönholm 14:03; J. Kytölä 38:50	Report	Pršić 1:11; Lazarević 11:10, 23:28, 28:25; Stojković 36:32

Energia Areena, Vantaa
Referee: Gábor Kovács (Hungary), Balázs Farkas (Hungary)

Serbia won 6–5 on aggregate.

== Qualified teams for FIFA Futsal World Cup ==
The following seven teams from UEFA qualified for the 2021 FIFA Futsal World Cup, including Lithuania which qualified as hosts.

Team	Qualified as	Qualified on	Previous appearances in FIFA Futsal World Cup^{1}
Lithuania	Hosts	26 October 2018	0 (debut)
Portugal	Elite round Group A winners	2 February 2020	5 (2000, 2004, 2008, 2012, 2016)
Spain	Elite round Group B winners	4 February 2020	8 (1989, 1992, 1996, **2000**, **2004**, 2008, 2012, 2016)
Russia	Elite round Group C winners	1 February 2020	6 (1992, 1996, 2000, 2008, 2012, 2016)
Kazakhstan	Elite round Group D winners	5 February 2020	2 (2000, 2016)
Czech Republic	Play-off winners	10 November 2020	3 (2004, 2008, 2012)
Serbia	Play-off winners	9 December 2020	1 (2012)

^{1} Bold indicates champions for that year. Italic indicates hosts for that year.

== Top goalscorers ==
- Preliminary round: There were 323 goals scored in 48 matches, for an average of 6.73 goals per match.
- Main round: There were 280 goals scored in 48 matches, for an average of 5.83 goals per match.
- Elite round: There were 130 goals scored in 24 matches, for an average of 5.42 goals per match.
- Play-offs: There were 19 goals scored in 4 matches, for an average of 4.75 goals per match.

— Team eliminated / inactive for this stage.

Rank	Player	PR	MR	ER	PO	Total
1	(Kazakhstan) Douglas Júnior	—	4	4	—	8
1	(Netherlands) Mats Velseboer	6	2	—	—	8
1	(Bosnia and Herzegovina) Anel Radmilović	7	1	—	—	8
4	(Switzerland) Alessandro Facchinetti	4	3	—	—	7
4	(Bosnia and Herzegovina) Nermin Kahvedžić	6	1	—	—	7
4	(Kosovo) Ramadan Alaj	6	1	—	—	7
4	(Moldova) Cristian Obadă	6	1	—	—	7
8	(Serbia) Marko Pršić	—	1	3	2	6
8	(Finland) Panu Autio	2	2	—	2	6
8	(Czech Republic) Michal Holý	—	2	3	1	6
8	(Portugal) Fernando Cardinal	—	4	2	—	6
8	(Slovenia) Kristjan Čujec	—	4	2	—	6
8	(Kazakhstan) Taynan	—	4	2	—	6
8	(Finland) Miika Hosio	2	2	2	—	6
8	(Slovakia) Tomáš Drahovský	—	5	1	—	6
8	(Moldova) Andrei Negara	3	3	—	—	6
8	(Belgium) Valentin Dujacquier	4	2	—	—	6
8	(Georgia (country)) Thales	4	2	—	—	6
8	(Moldova) Sergiu Tacot	5	1	—	—	6
