= Italy national futsal team =

Italy
- Shirt badge/Association crest
- Nickname(s): Gli Azzurri (The Blues)
- Association: Federazione Italiana Giuoco Calcio
- Confederation: UEFA (Europe)
- Head coach: (Italy) Massimiliano Bellarte
- Most caps: Marco Ercolessi (127)
- Top scorer: Andrea Rubei (97)
- FIFA code: ITA
- FIFA ranking: 17 ▼1 (8 May 2026)
Home colours	Away colours

First international
- Italy 9–2 Libya (Roma, Italy; 19 July 1974)

Biggest win
- Italy 13–1 Australia (Singapore, Singapore; 28 November 2001); Italy 12–0 Finland (Montesilvano, Italy; 8 November 2003); Italy 13–1 China (Chieti, Italy; 22 September 2010)

Biggest defeat
- Brazil 9–0 Italy (Genk, Belgium; 25 May 1995)

FIFA World Cup
- Appearances: 7 (First in 1989)
- Best result: (silver) Runner-up (2004)

AMF World Cup
- Appearances: 5 (First in 1982)
- Best result: 1st round (1982, 1988, 1991, 1994, 2003)

European Championship
- Appearances: 10 (First in 1996)
- Best result: (gold) Champions (2003, 2014)

Confederations Cup
- Appearances: 1 (First in 2014)
- Best result: 4th place (2014)

Grand Prix de Futsal
- Appearances: 2 (First in 2006)
- Best result: (silver) Runner-up (2006)

The Italy national futsal team represents Italy in international futsal competitions such as the FIFA Futsal World Cup and the European Championships and is controlled by the Italian Football Federation. It is one of the strongest teams in Europe, champions in the 2003 UEFA Futsal Championship and UEFA Futsal Euro 2014. Italy has also come in second place at the 2004 FIFA Futsal World Cup, as well as third place in the 2008 and 2012 editions.

== Honours ==
=== World achievements ===
- The Italy national futsal team has appeared in the final match of the FIFA Futsal World Cup once (2004) as well as two third/fourth place playoffs.

=== European achievements ===
- The Italy national futsal team has won the UEFA Futsal Championship twice (2003, 2014), came in as runners-up once (2007), and appeared in four third/fourth place playoffs

== Tournament records ==
=== FIFA Futsal World Cup ===
FIFA Futsal World Cup record								Qualification record					
Year	Round	Pld	W	D*	L	GF	GA	Pld	W	D	L	GF	GA
(Netherlands) 1989	2nd round	6	3	0	3	17	16	Qualified as invitees					
(Hong Kong) 1992	1st round	3	1	0	2	15	16	4	2	0	2	17	10
(Spain) 1996	2nd round	6	3	1	2	21	13	Qualified from participation in Euro 1996					
(Guatemala) 2000	Did not qualify							5	3	2	0	17	6
(Taiwan) 2004	Runners-up	8	6	1	1	29	13	5	5	0	0	33	0
(Brazil) 2008	3rd place	9	5	1	3	25	18	5	5	0	0	37	4
(Thailand) 2012	3rd place	7	6	0	1	32	13	5	5	0	0	26	5
(Colombia) 2016	Round of 16	4	3	0	1	14	7	5	4	0	1	19	4
(Lithuania) 2021	Did not qualify							6	3	2	1	19	14
(Uzbekistan) 2024	Did not qualify							10	4	3	3	36	32
Total	7/10	43	27	3	13	153	96	45	31	7	7	204	75

=== UEFA European Futsal Championship ===
UEFA Futsal Championship record								Qualification record					
Year	Round	Pld	W	D*	L	GF	GA	Pld	W	D	L	GF	GA
(Spain) 1996	4th place	4	1	0	3	10	15	5	5	0	0	23	13
(Spain) 1999	3rd place	5	2	2	1	12	9	3	3	0	0	13	4
(Russia) 2001	4th place	5	3	1	1	18	12	2	2	0	0	12	3
(Italy) 2003	Champions	5	5	0	0	11	3	Qualified as Host Nation					
(Czech Republic) 2005	3rd place	5	4	0	1	21	9	3	3	0	0	19	3
(Portugal) 2007	Runners-up	5	3	1	1	14	4	3	3	0	0	26	4
(Hungary) 2010	Quarter-finals	3	2	1	0	11	5	3	3	0	0	19	1
(Croatia) 2012	3rd place	5	3	1	1	11	5	3	3	0	0	12	1
(Belgium) 2014	Champions	5	4	0	1	18	8	3	3	0	0	20	2
(Serbia) 2016	Quarter-finals	3	2	0	1	12	5	3	3	0	0	12	4
(Slovenia) 2018	Group stage	2	0	1	1	2	3	3	2	1	0	8	5
(Netherlands) 2022	Group stage	3	0	2	1	6	9	6	5	0	1	24	12
(Latvia) (Lithuania) (Slovenia) 2026	Quarter-finals	4	1	1	2	8	12	8	7	1	0	29	13
Total:13/13	2 Titles	54	30	10	14	154	99	45	42	2	1	217	61

=== Grand Prix de Futsal ===
Grand Prix de Futsal Record
Year	Round	Pld	W	D	L	GS	GA
Brazil 2005	did not enter	–	–	–	–	–	–
Brazil 2006	Runners-up	4	2	1	1	15	10
Brazil 2007	did not enter	–	–	–	–	–	–
Brazil 2008	did not enter	–	–	–	–	–	–
Brazil 2009	did not enter	–	–	–	–	–	–
Brazil 2010	5th place	6	4	0	2	14	11
Brazil 2011	did not enter	–	–	–	–	–	–
Brazil 2013	did not enter	–	–	–	–	–	–
Brazil 2014	did not enter	–	–	–	–	–	–
Brazil 2015	did not enter	–	–	–	–	–	–
Brazil 2018	TBD	–	–	–	–	–	–
Total	2/11	10	6	1	3	29	21

=== Futsal Confederations Cup ===
Confederations Cup Record
Year	Round	Pld	W	D	L	GS	GA
Libya 2009	did not enter	–	–	–	–	–	–
Brazil 2013	did not enter	–	–	–	–	–	–
Kuwait 2014	4th place	5	3	1	1	12	11
Total	1/3	5	3	1	1	12	11

=== Futsal Mundialito ===
Futsal Mundialito Record
Year	Round	Pld	W	D	L	GS	GA
Italy 1994	Champions	5	4	1	0	29	8
Brazil 1995	Runners-up	4	2	1	1	18	14
Brazil 1996	did not enter	–	–	–	–	–	–
Brazil 1998	4th place	4	1	0	3	8	8
Brazil 2001	did not enter	–	–	–	–	–	–
Italy 2002	Runners-up	5	3	1	1	15	6
Portugal 2006	did not enter	–	–	–	–	–	–
Portugal 2007	did not enter	–	–	–	–	–	–
Portugal 2008	did not enter	–	–	–	–	–	–
Total	4/9	18	10	3	5	70	36

== Players ==
=== Current squad ===
The following players were called up to the squad for the UEFA 2024 FIFA Futsal World Cup qualification matches against Slovenia and Spain on 15 and 20 September 2023, respectively.
Head coach: Massimiliano Bellarte

No.	Pos.	Player	Date of birth (age)	Caps	Club
1	GK	Lorenzo Pietrangelo	24 June 1995 (age 31)		(Italy) Came Treviso
12	GK	Jurij Bellobuono	22 January 1998 (age 28)		(Italy) Napoli Futsal
2	DF	Gennaro Galletto	12 December 1993 (age 32)		(Italy) Napoli Futsal
3	DF	Lorenzo Etzi	27 November 2002 (age 23)		(Italy) Sandro Abate
8	DF	Carmelo Musumeci (captain)	17 December 1991 (age 34)		(Italy) Meta Catania
13	DF	Francesco Liberti	22 January 1995 (age 31)		(Italy) Feldi Eboli
14	DF	Enrico Donin	14 December 1998 (age 27)		(Italy) Saviatesta Mantova
4	FW	Gabriele Ugherani	21 November 1994 (age 31)		(Italy) Sandro Abate
5	FW	Alessio Di Eugenio	12 January 1998 (age 28)		(Italy) Olimpus Roma
6	FW	Gabriel Pazetti	22 January 2002 (age 24)		(Italy) L84
7	FW	Antonino Isgrò	19 June 2002 (age 24)		(Italy) Olimpus Roma
9	FW	Fabricio Calderolli	22 June 1986 (age 40)		(Italy) Feldi Eboli
10	FW	Alex Merlim	15 July 1986 (age 40)		(Portugal) Sporting CP
11	FW	Gabriel Motta	16 August 1999 (age 26)		(Spain) Jimbee Cartagena
16	FW	Cristopher Cutrupi	19 April 1993 (age 33)		(Italy) Olimpus Roma
19	FW	Marcelinho	5 August 1989 (age 36)		(Italy) Olimpus Roma

=== Recent call-ups ===
The following players have also been called up to the squad within the last 12 months.

Pos.	Player	Date of birth (age)	Caps	Goals	Club	Latest call-up
GK	Gianluca Parisi	2 June 1996 (age 30)			(Italy) Sandro Abate	v. Slovenia, 15 September 2023^{PRE}
DF	Giuliano Fortini	8 September 1996 (age 29)			(Italy) L84	v. Slovenia, 15 September 2023^{PRE}
DF	Francesco Lo Cicero	7 July 2000 (age 26)			(Italy) Ecocity Genzano	v. Sweden, 8 March 2023
FW	Giovanni Vincenti	11 April 2001 (age 25)			(Italy) Elledì Fossano	v. Slovenia, 15 September 2023^{PRE}
FW	Nicola Cutrignelli	12 October 1992 (age 33)			(Italy) Sporting Sala Consilina	v. Sweden, 8 March 2023
^{COV} Player withdrew from the squad due to contracting COVID-19.^{INJ} Player withdrew from the squad due to an injury.^{PRE} Preliminary squad.^{RET} Retired from international futsal.

== Results and fixtures ==
=== 2014 ===
7 January 2014 Friendly	Italy	3–0	Slovakia	San Vito al Tagliamento, Italy
20:00		Report

8 January 2014 Friendly	Italy	3–1	Slovakia	San Vito al Tagliamento, Italy
20:30		Report

29 January 2014 UEFA Futsal Euro 2014	Italy	2–3	Slovenia	Lotto Arena, Antwerp
20:45	Fortino 24'; Saad 40'	Report	Vrhovec 11'; Čujec 26'; Osredkar 39'	Referee: Oleg Ivanov (Ukraine)

2 February 2014 UEFA Futsal Euro 2014	Azerbaijan	0–7	Italy	Lotto Arena, Antwerp
18:30		Report	Romano 2'; Fortino 4'; Honorio 16'; Vampeta 25'; Gabriel Lima 27'; Mammarella 32'; Miarelli 40'	Referee: Marc Birkett (England)

4 February 2014 UEFA Futsal Euro 2014	Italy	2–1	Croatia	Sportpaleis, Antwerp
18:00	Romano 1'; Fortino 10'	Report	Jelovčić 7'	Referee: Fernando Gutiérrez Lumbreras (Spain)

6 February 2014 UEFA Futsal Euro 2014	Portugal	3–4	Italy	Sportpaleis, Antwerp
18:00	Ricardinho 13'; Arnaldo 19'; Joel 35'	Report	Gabriel Lima 1', 31'; Romano 23'; Fortino 35'	Referee: Ondřej Černý (Czech Republic)

8 February 2014 UEFA Futsal Euro 2014	Italy	3–1	Russia	Sportpaleis, Antwerp
20:30	Gabriel Lima 7'; Murilo 14'; Giasson 19'	Report	Eder Lima 10'	Referee: Fernando Gutiérrez Lumbreras (Spain)

== See also ==
- Italy women's national futsal team
- Italy national football team
- Italy women's national football team
- Serie A1 (futsal)
- Italy Futsal League
