= Branko Laura =

Croatian futsal player

Laura
Personal information
- Full name: Branko Laura
- Date of birth: 21 October 1982 (age 44)
- Place of birth: Croatia
- Position: Ala

Team information
- Current team: MNK Split

International career
Years	Team	Apps	(Gls)
2008–2012	Croatia	20	(1)

Branko Laura (born 21 October 1982), is a Croatian futsal player who plays for MNK Split Brodosplit Inženjering and the Croatia national futsal team.

== Sources ==
- Branko Laura at the Croatian Football Federation
