= Maro Đuraš =

Croatian futsal player (born 1994)

Personal information
- Date of birth: 4 June 1994 (age 32)
- Place of birth: Dubrovnik, Croatia
- Position: Forward

Team information
- Current team: Square Dubrovnik

Senior career*
| Years | Team | Apps | (Gls) |
| 2012–2017 | Square Dubrovnik | | |
| 2017–2018 | Split | | |
| 2018–2020 | Square Dubrovnik | | |
| 2020–2021 | Weilimdorf | | |
| 2021– | Square Dubrovnik | | |

International career
| 2014– | Croatia | | |
- * Club domestic league appearances and goals

Maro Đuraš (born 6 June 1994) is a Croatian futsal player who plays for Square Dubrovnik and the Croatian national team.

== Club career ==
Đuraš grew up in his hometown team, Square Dubrovnik, where he made his debut in the 2012–13 season. The pivot's consecration came in the 2016–17 season, when he scored 17 goals in the Croatian Prva HMNL, convincing the renowned Split to invest in him. The experience in Split lasted just one year, during which Đuraš contributed to the victory of the national cup. In the 2018–19 season he returned to Square, where he remained until the summer of 2020 when he moved to Weilimdorf, with whom he won a Bundesliga championship. Having failed to transfer to the Italian team Real San Giuseppe, in September 2021 he returned to Square again.

== International career ==
On 18 December 2014, Đuraš made his debut for the Croatian national team in a 1–1 friendly draw against Japan; on 11 February 2015, he scored his first goal in a 5–1 friendly win against France. Đuraš has played in two UEFA Futsal Championships so far (2016 and 2022).

== Honours ==
Square Dubrovnik

- Croatian Futsal Cup: 2017–18

Weilimdorf

- Futsal Bundesliga: 2020–21
