= Robert Grdović =

Croatian futsal coach

Personal information
- Date of birth: 23 February 1974 (age 52)
- Place of birth: Sindelfingen, West Germany
- Height: 1.90 m (6 ft 3 in)

Senior career*
Years	Team	Apps	(Gls)
1998–2000	Uspinjača Zagreb		
2000–2001	Cagliari Futsal		
2001–2002	Genzano Calcio a 5		
2002–2003	Uspinjača Zagreb		
2003–2004	Petar		
2004–2006	Gospić		
2006–2007	Uspinjača Zagreb		
2007–2008	Split		
2010–2011	Zapad		

International career
1998–2008	Croatia	56	(40)

Managerial career
- 2010–2011: Zapad
- 2011–2016: Nacional Zagreb
- 2016–2017: Brezje
- 2017–2018: Nacional Zagreb
- 2019–2020: Turkmenistan
- 2020–2022: FC Ptuj
- 2022–: Meteorplast Ljutomer
- * Club domestic league appearances and goals

Robert Grdović (born 23 February 1974) is a Croatian futsal manager and former player.

== Playing career ==
During his futsal career, Grdović played for the clubs Uspinjača Zagreb (Croatia), Cagliari Futsal (Italy), Genzano Calcio a 5 (Italy), Petar (Croatia), Gospić (Croatia), Split (Croatia), and Zapad (Croatia).

He also played for the Croatian national futsal team, making 56 appearances between 1998 and 2008. He retired in 2011.

== Coaching career ==
As a football coach, he was a manager of the Croatian teams Zapad and Nacional Zagreb. Grdović also worked as the coach-consultant of the Croatian national futsal team.

With the cooperation of the Croatian Football Federation and the Football Federation of Turkmenistan, it was announced in March 2019 that Grdović would take over the Turkmenistan national futsal team.

In March 2020, Grdović left the team due to the expiration of the contract and the postponement of matches of the 2020 AFC Futsal Championship.
