= Suton =

Suton may refer to

- Suton, Norfolk, a hamlet in England
- Goran Suton (born 1985), Croatian basketball player
- Josip Suton (born 1988), Croatian futsal player
