= Croatia national futsal team =

Croatia
- Nickname(s): Mini vatreni (The Mini Blazers)
- Association: Croatian Football Federation
- Confederation: UEFA (Europe)
- Head coach: Marinko Mavrović
- Captain: Franco Jelovčić
- Most caps: Ivo Jukić (119)
- Top scorer: Dario Marinović (68)
- Home stadium: Arena Zagreb
- FIFA code: CRO
- FIFA ranking: 13 (24 September 2026)
Home colours	Away colours

First international
- Italy 4–1 Croatia (Milano, Italy; March 14, 1994)

Biggest win
- Croatia 18–4 Japan (Milano, Italy; March 15, 1994)

Biggest defeat
- Croatia 0–10 Spain (Águilas, Spain; March 30, 2013)

FIFA World Cup
- Appearances: 2 (First in 2000)
- Best result: Fifth place (2000)

European Championship
- Appearances: 5 (First in 1999)
- Best result: (bronze) Third place (2026)

Confederations Cup
- Appearances: 1 (First in 2013)
- Best result: Fourth place (2013)

Grand Prix de Futsal
- Appearances: 2 (First in 2006)
- Best result: (bronze) Third place (2006)

The Croatia national futsal team represents Croatia during international futsal competitions and is controlled by the Croatian Football Federation and represents the country in international futsal competitions, such as the FIFA Futsal World Cup and the European Championships.

== Results ==
=== FIFA Futsal World Cup ===
FIFA Futsal World Cup Record
Year	Round	Pld	W	D*	L	GS	GA	DIF
Netherlands 1989	As Part of (Socialist Federal Republic of Yugoslavia) Socialist Federal Republic of Yugoslavia							
Hong Kong 1992	As Part of (Socialist Federal Republic of Yugoslavia) Socialist Federal Republic of Yugoslavia							
Spain 1996	Did not qualify							
Guatemala 2000	Second round (As Roung of 8)	6	3	0	3	18	15	+3
Chinese Taipei 2004	Did not qualify							
Brazil 2008	Did not qualify							
Thailand 2012	Did not qualify							
Colombia 2016	Did not qualify							
Lithuania 2021	Did not qualify							
Uzbekistan 2024	Round of 16	4	1	0	3	9	12	-3
Total	2/10	10	4	0	6	27	27	0

=== UEFA European Futsal Championship ===
UEFA European Futsal Championship Record
Year	Round	Pld	W	D*	L	GS	GA	DIF
Spain 1996	Did not enter							
Spain 1999	Group stage	3	1	0	2	8	14	–6
Russia 2001	Group stage	3	1	0	2	2	9	–7
Italy 2003	Did not qualify							
Czech Republic 2005	Did not qualify							
Portugal 2007	Did not qualify							
Hungary 2010	Did not qualify							
Croatia 2012	Fourth place	4	2	1	1	10	10	0
Belgium 2014	Quarter-finals	3	0	2	1	7	8	–1
Serbia 2016	Group stage	2	0	1	1	4	6	–2
Slovenia 2018	Did not qualify							
Netherlands 2022	Group stage	3	1	0	2	6	10	–4
Latvia/Lithuania/Slovenia 2026	Third place	6	2	3	1	17	12	+5
Total:7/13	Third place	24	7	7	10	54	69	–15

=== Grand Prix de Futsal ===
Grand Prix de Futsal Record
Year	Round	Pld	W	D*	L	GS	GA	DIF
Brazil 2005	did not enter	-	-	-	-	-	-	-
Brazil 2006	Third place	4	2	1	1	8	15	–7
Brazil 2007	did not enter	-	-	-	-	-	-	-
Brazil 2008	Seventh place	6	3	0	3	8	14	–6
Brazil 2009	did not enter	-	-	-	-	-	-	-
Brazil 2010	did not enter	-	-	-	-	-	-	-
Brazil 2011	did not enter	-	-	-	-	-	-	-
Brazil 2013	did not enter	-	-	-	-	-	-	-
Brazil 2014	did not enter	-	-	-	-	-	-	-
Brazil 2015	did not enter	-	-	-	-	-	-	-
Brazil 2017	TBD	-	-	-	-	-	-	-
Total	2/11	10	5	1	4	16	29	–13

=== Confederations Cup ===
Confederations Cup record
Year	Round	Pld	W	D*	L	GS	GA	DIF
Libya 2009	did not enter	-	-	-	-	-	-	-
Brazil 2013	Fourth place	3	0	1	2	3	12	–9
Kuwait 2014	did not enter	-	-	-	-	-	-	-
Total	1/3	3	0	1	2	3	12	–9

=== Futsal Mundialito ===
Futsal Mundialito Record
Year	Round	Pld	W	D*	L	GS	GA	DIF
Italy 1994	Runners-up	5	3	1	1	38	18	+20
Brazil 1995	did not enter	-	-	-	-	-	-	-
Brazil 1996	did not enter	-	-	-	-	-	-	-
Brazil 1998	did not enter	-	-	-	-	-	-	-
Brazil 2001	did not enter	-	-	-	-	-	-	-
Italy 2002	did not enter	-	-	-	-	-	-	-
Portugal 2006	Runners-up	4	3	0	1	14	5	+9
Portugal 2007	Fourth place	4	2	0	2	17	18	–1
Portugal 2008	Fifth place	3	1	0	2	7	9	–2
Total	4/9	16	9	1	6	76	50	+26

=== Mediterranean Cup ===
Mediterranean Cup Record
Year	Round	Pld	W	D*	L	GS	GA	DIF
Libya 2010	Champions	6	5	1	0	31	9	+22
Total	1/1	6	5	1	0	31	9	+22

*Denotes draws include knockout matches decided on penalty kicks.

== Players ==
=== Current squad ===
No.	Pos.	Player	Date of birth (age)	Caps	Goals	Club
1	GK	Žarko Luketin	16 March 1989 (aged 32)	50	3	(Croatian Football Federation) MNK Futsal Pula Stanoinvest
12	GK	Zoran Primić	21 April 1991 (aged 30)	27	0	(Croatian Football Federation) HMNK Vrgorac
7	DF	Franco Jelovčić	6 July 1991 (aged 30)	94	56	(Royal Belgian Football Association) FP Halle-Gooik
2	DF	Vedran Matošević	27 August 1990 (aged 31)	71	21	(Football Association of Slovenia) FK Dobovec
10	DF	Tihomir Novak	24 October 1986 (aged 35)	107	37	(Football Association of Slovenia) FK Dobovec
13	DF	Kristijan Postružin	28 August 1995 (aged 26)	32	6	(Croatian Football Federation) MNK Olmissum Omiš
11	DF	Josip Suton	14 November 1988 (aged 33)	76	27	(Italian Football Federation) CAME Dosson Calcio a 5
5	DF	Davor Kanjuh	20 July 1989 (aged 32)	34	7	(Croatian Football Federation) MNK Futsal Dinamo
6	FW	Maro Đuraš	6 June 1994 (aged 27)	28	6	(Croatian Football Federation) MNK Square Dubrovnik
15	FW	Matej Horvat	30 January 1994 (aged 28)	51	5	(Croatian Football Federation) MNK Olmissum Omiš
17	FW	Antonio Sekulić	22 January 1999 (aged 23)	13	5	(Croatian Football Federation) MNK Olmissum Omiš
4	FW	Josip Jurlina	13 January 2000 (aged 22)	18	2	(Croatian Football Federation) MNK Olmissum Omiš
3	FW	Kristian Čekol	30 December 1997 (aged 24)	18	0	(Croatian Football Federation) MNK Futsal Dinamo
8	FW	Dario Marinović	24 May 1990 (aged 31)	89	68	(Royal Spanish Football Federation) Futsal Cartagena

== Notable players ==
- Robert Grdović
- Patrik Drndić
- Robertino Jelovčić
- Nikola Tomičić
- Mićo Martić
- Ivica Lemo
- Goran Eklić
- Tomislav Gričar
- Dinko Huskić
- Josip Palić
- Pjer Malvasija
- Alen Delpont
- Željko Mijić
- Boris Držanić
- Boris Durlen
- Dean Delevski
- Tomislav Papeš
- Velimir Čarapina
- Edin Dervišagić
- Siniša Alebić
- Božidar Butigan
- Edin Derviščaušević
- Mate Čuljak
- Alen Jukić
- Marijan Brnčić
- Ivica Gvozden
- Robert Karašić
- Korab Morina
- Kujtim Morina
- Dario Marinović

== Player statistics ==
As of 30 January 2022

Most appearances
Name	Matches	Position	Years
Ivo Jukić	119	GK	2006–2017
Tihomir Novak	107	D	2007–Present
Franko Jelovčić	94	D	2011–Present
Jakov Grcić	91	D	2007–2017
Dario Marinović	89	P	2008–Present
Josip Suton	76	D	2009–Present
Vedran Matošević	71	D	2009–Present
Saša Babić	65	P	2011–2017
Frane Despotović	64		2006–2015
Matija Dulvat	57		2003–2012
Robert Grdović	56		1998–2008
Kristijan Grbeša	52	P	2011–2019

Top scorers
Name	Goals	Position	Years
Dario Marinović	68	P	2008–Present
Franko Jelovčić	56	D	2011–Present
Robert Grdović	40		1998–2008
Tihomir Novak	37	D	2007–Present
Jakov Grcić	36	D	2007–2017
Josip Suton	27	D	2009–Present
Vedran Matošević	21	D	2009–Present
Matija Dulvat	18		2003–2012
Dean Banić	18		2006–2011
Duje Bajrušović	17	D	2004–2020
Kristijan Grbeša	14	P	2011–2019
Frane Despotović	14		2006–2015

== Record against other teams ==
As of 30 January 2022

Key
Positive total balance (more wins)
Neutral total balance (equal W/L ratio)
Negative total balance (more losses)

National team	Total				FIFA World Cup				Confederations Cup				UEFA European Championship				Mediterranean Games				Qualifications				Tournaments *			
National team	Pld	W	D	L	Pld	W	D	L	Pld	W	D	L	Pld	W	D	L	Pld	W	D	L	Pld	W	D	L	Pld	W	D	L
Albania	4	4	0	0	0	0	0	0	0	0	0	0	3	3	0	0	0	0	0	0	1	1	0	0	0	0	0	0
Andorra	3	3	0	0	0	0	0	0	0	0	0	0	0	0	0	0	0	0	0	0	3	2	0	0	0	0	0	0
Angola	4	3	0	1	0	0	0	0	0	0	0	0	—	—	—	—	—	—	—	—	0	0	0	0	4	3	0	1
Argentina	4	1	1	2	1	1	0	0	0	0	0	0	—	—	—	—	—	—	—	—	0	0	0	0	3	0	1	2
Armenia	3	3	0	0	0	0	0	0	0	0	0	0	0	0	0	0	—	—	—	—	3	3	0	0	0	0	0	0
Australia	2	2	0	0	2	2	0	0	0	0	0	0	—	—	—	—	—	—	—	—	0	0	0	0	0	0	0	0
Azerbaijan	5	4	1	0	0	0	0	0	0	0	0	0	0	0	0	0	—	—	—	—	5	4	1	0	0	0	0	0
Belarus	3	2	0	1	0	0	0	0	0	0	0	0	0	0	0	0	—	—	—	—	3	2	0	1	0	0	0	0
Belgium	6	5	1	0	2	2	0	0	0	0	0	0	2	2	0	0	—	—	—	—	2	0	2	0	0	0	0	0
(Bosnia and Herzegovina) Bosnia and Herzegovina	11	5	2	4	0	0	0	0	0	0	0	0	1	1	0	0	0	0	0	0	3	3	2	0	4	1	0	3
Brazil	7	0	0	7	0	0	0	0	4	0	0	4	—	—	—	—	—	—	—	—	0	0	0	0	3	0	0	3
Chile	2	1	1	0	0	0	0	0	1	0	1	0	—	—	—	—	—	—	—	—	0	0	0	0	1	1	0	0
Colombia	2	0	0	2	0	0	0	0	1	0	0	1	—	—	—	—	—	—	—	—	0	0	0	0	1	0	0	1
Costa Rica	1	1	0	0	1	1	0	0	0	0	0	0	—	—	—	—	—	—	—	—	1	0	1	0	0	0	0	0
Czech Republic	21	13	2	6	4	4	0	0	0	0	0	0	9	5	2	2	—	—	—	—	4	2	0	2	4	2	0	2
Denmark	2	2	0	0	0	0	0	0	0	0	0	0	0	0	0	0	0	0	0	0	2	2	0	0	0	0	0	0
England	1	1	0	0	0	0	0	0	0	0	0	0	0	0	0	0	0	0	0	0	2	2	0	0	0	0	0	0
France	5	3	1	1	0	0	0	0	0	0	0	0	0	0	0	0	0	0	0	0	2	2	0	0	0	0	0	0
Finland	2	1	0	1	0	0	0	0	0	0	0	0	0	0	0	0	0	0	0	0	2	1	0	1	0	0	0	0
Georgia	4	4	0	0	0	0	0	0	0	0	0	0	0	0	0	0	—	—	—	—	2	2	0	0	2	2	0	0
Greece	1	0	1	0	0	0	0	0	0	0	0	0	0	0	0	0	0	0	0	0	1	0	1	0	0	0	0	0
Hungary	22	6	9	7	0	0	0	0	0	0	0	0	0	0	0	0	—	—	—	—	2	0	0	2	7	1	2	4
Iran	6	0	1	5	0	0	0	0	0	0	0	0	—	—	—	—	—	—	—	—	0	0	0	0	0	0	0	0
Italy	21	3	3	15	0	0	0	0	0	0	0	0	2	0	0	2	0	0	0	0	2	0	0	2	4	0	0	4
Japan	5	3	1	1	1	1	0	0	0	0	0	0	—	—	—	—	—	—	—	—	0	0	0	0	0	0	0	0
Kazakhstan	4	1	1	2	0	0	0	0	0	0	0	0	1	0	0	1	—	—	—	—	1	1	0	0	0	0	0	0
Latvia	2	2	0	0	0	0	0	0	0	0	0	0	0	0	0	0	—	—	—	—	2	2	0	0	0	0	0	0
Lebanon	1	1	0	0	0	0	0	0	0	0	0	0	—	—	—	—	1	1	0	0	0	0	0	0	0	0	0	0
Libya	5	4	1	0	0	0	0	0	0	0	0	0	—	—	—	—	1	0	1	0	0	0	0	0	0	0	0	0
Macedonia	10	8	1	1	0	0	0	0	0	0	0	0	0	0	0	0	0	0	0	0	3	3	0	0	0	0	0	0
Morocco	1	1	0	0	0	0	0	0	0	0	0	0	—	—	—	—	1	1	0	0	0	0	0	0	0	0	0	0
Mozambique	1	1	0	0	0	0	0	0	0	0	0	0	—	—	—	—	—	—	—	—	0	0	0	0	0	0	0	0
Montenegro	1	1	0	0	0	0	0	0	0	0	0	0	—	—	—	—	—	—	—	—	0	0	0	0	0	0	0	0
Netherlands	5	3	0	2	1	1	0	0	0	0	0	0	1	0	0	1	—	—	—	—	1	0	0	1	0	0	0	0
Palestine	1	1	0	0	0	0	0	0	0	0	0	0	—	—	—	—	1	1	0	0	0	0	0	0	0	0	0	0
Paraguay	2	1	0	1	0	0	0	0	0	0	0	0	—	—	—	—	—	—	—	—	0	0	0	0	0	0	0	0
Poland	7	5	2	0	0	0	0	0	0	0	0	0	2	2	0	0	—	—	—	—	2	1	1	0	0	0	0	0
Portugal	4	0	0	4	1	0	0	1	0	0	0	0	0	0	0	0	—	—	—	—	0	0	0	0	1	0	0	1
Romania	5	3	1	1	0	0	0	0	0	0	0	0	1	1	0	0	—	—	—	—	0	0	0	0	0	0	0	0
Russia	11	0	4	7	1	0	0	1	0	0	0	0	3	0	1	2	—	—	—	—	0	0	0	0	0	0	0	0
Serbia **	1	1	0	0	0	0	0	0	0	0	0	0	1	1	0	0	0	0	0	0	0	0	0	0	0	0	0	0
Slovakia	10	7	0	3	0	0	0	0	0	0	0	0	1	0	0	1	—	—	—	—	5	5	0	0	2	0	0	2
Slovenia	12	8	2	2	0	0	0	0	0	0	0	0	0	0	0	0	1	1	0	0	1	1	0	0	0	0	0	0
San Marino	1	1	0	0	0	0	0	0	0	0	0	0	0	0	0	0	1	1	0	0	1	1	0	0	0	0	0	0
Spain	8	1	1	6	1	0	0	1	0	0	0	0	3	0	1	3	0	0	0	0	2	0	0	2	1	1	0	0
Sweden	3	3	0	0	0	0	0	0	0	0	0	0	0	0	0	0	—	—	—	—	2	2	0	0	0	0	0	0
Turkey	3	3	0	0	0	0	0	0	0	0	0	0	0	0	0	0	1	1	0	0	2	2	0	0	0	0	0	0
Ukraine	13	5	2	6	3	0	0	3	0	0	0	0	4	2	1	1	—	—	—	—	2	1	0	1	4	2	1	1
Vietnam	2	2	0	0	0	0	0	0	0	0	0	0	—	—	—	—	—	—	—	—	0	0	0	0	0	0	0	0
Total (49)	258	131	39	88																								

** includes games against Serbia and Montenegro / FR Yugoslavia
* other international (invitational) competitions: Grand Prix de Futsal (2005-2014), Futsal Mundialito (2007-2008)

=== Biggest Wins ===
FIFA World Cup	Confederations Cup	European Championship	Mediterranean Games	Qualifications	Tournaments
+6 vs. Australia (6-0) 2000; +3 vs. Costa Rica (4-1) 2000; +3 vs. Netherlands (5-2) 2000	—	+2 vs. Poland (3-1) 2022	+7 vs. Palestine (8-1) 2010; +4 vs. Lebanon (5-1) 2010; +4 vs. Morocco (5-1) 2010; +4 vs. Slovenia (7-3) 2010	+10 vs. Turkey (10-0) 2015; +8 vs. Armenia (8-0) 2015; +7 vs. Sweden (7-0) 2013	+5 vs. Angola (7-2) 2007; +4 vs. Georgia (5-1) 2008; +3 vs. Chile (3-0) 2008

=== Biggest Losses ===
FIFA World Cup	Confederations Cup	European Championship	Mediterranean Games	Qualifications	Tournaments
-7 vs. Brazil (1-8) 2024; -5 vs. Spain (0-5) 2000	-7 vs. Brazil (0-7) 2013; -2 vs. Colombia (2-4) 2013	-5 vs. Netherlands (3-8) 1999; -5 vs. Ukraine (0-5) 2001	—	-10 vs. Spain (0-10) 2013; -3 vs. Belarus (4-7) 2016; -3 vs. Italy (3-6) 2008; -3 vs. Italy (0-3) 2008; -3 vs. Ukraine (1-4) 2012	-7 vs. Brazil (0-7) 2008; -6 vs. Hungary (3-9) 2007; -5 vs. Brazil (1-6) 2006; -5 vs. Italy (1-6) 2006
