= Ivo Jukić =

Croatian futsal player

Jukić
Personal information
- Full name: Ivo Jukić
- Date of birth: 13 April 1986 (age 40)
- Place of birth: Croatia
- Position: Goalkeeper

Team information
- Current team: Prato C5

International career^{‡}
Years	Team	Apps	(Gls)
2006–2017	Croatia	111	(1)
- ‡ National team caps and goals as of 25 November 2019

Ivo Jukić (born 13 April 1986) is a Croatian futsal player who played for FC Split Tommy and the Croatia national futsal team. As of 2020, he holds the record as the most capped Croatian futsal player.
