= Frane Despotović =

Croatian futsal player

Despotović
Personal information
- Full name: Frane Despotović
- Date of birth: 25 April 1982 (age 44)
- Place of birth: Croatia
- Position: Ala

Team information
- Current team: Balzan
- Number: 5

International career
| Years | Team | Apps | (Gls) |
- Croatia

Frane Despotović (born 25 April 1982) is a Croatian futsal player who plays for Balzan and the Croatia national futsal team.

In 2015, Despotović scored a last-minute goal in the final of the Gatorade Knock-Out, giving Balzan a 5–4 victory over Luxol St. Andrews’s at the Corradino Pavilion.
