= Futsal Mundialito =

Futsal tournament

The Futsal Mundialito was an international futsal competition of the same kind of the FIFA Futsal World Cup but with invited nations similar to the Grand Prix de Futsal. It was held from 1994 to 2008.

== Results ==
Year	Host	Final			Third Place Match
Year	Host	Champion	Score	Second Place	Third Place	Score	Fourth Place
1994; Details	Milan; Italy	Italy	Group Stage	Croatia	Spain	Group Stage	Hungary
1995; Details	Rio de Janeiro; Brazil	Brazil	7–2	Italy	Spain	9–2	United States
1996; Details	Rio de Janeiro; Brazil	Brazil	6–0	Paraguay	Argentina	Group Stage	United States
1998; Details	Rio de Janeiro; Brazil	Brazil	2–0	Argentina	United States	Group Stage	Italy
2001; Details	Joinville; Brazil	Brazil	4–1	Argentina	Portugal	1–0	Czech Republic
2002; Details	Reggio Calabria; Italy	Brazil	3–1	Italy	Russia	5–3	Argentina
2006; Details	Algarve; Portugal	Portugal	3–2	Croatia	Angola	3–1	Mozambique
2007; Details	Algarve; Portugal	Portugal	6–1	Slovakia	Hungary	9–3	Croatia
2008; Details	Algarve; Portugal	Portugal	7–0	Hungary	Angola	5–2	Libya

=== Medal count ===
Rank	Nation	Gold	Silver	Bronze	Total
1	Brazil	5	0	0	5
2	Portugal	3	0	1	4
3	Italy	1	2	0	3
4	Argentina	0	2	1	3
5	Croatia	0	2	0	2
6	Hungary	0	1	1	2
7	Paraguay	0	1	0	1
7	Slovakia	0	1	0	1
9	Angola	0	0	2	2
9	Spain	0	0	2	2
11	Russia	0	0	1	1
11	United States	0	0	1	1
Totals (12 entries)		9	9	9	27

=== Participating nations ===
Legend

- 1st — Champions
- 2nd — Runners-up
- 3rd — Third place
- 4th — Fourth place
- 5th-8th — Fifth to Eighth place
- R1 — Round 1
- q — Qualified for upcoming tournament
- — Hosts

Nation	1994 (Italy)	1995 (Brazil)	1996 (Brazil)	1998 (Brazil)	2001 (Brazil)	2002 (Italy)	2006 (Portugal)	2007 (Portugal)	2008 (Portugal)	Years
Angola							3rd	6th	3rd	3
Argentina		R1	3rd	2nd	2nd	4th				5
Australia		R1	5th							2
Belgium				5th		8th				2
Brazil		1st	1st	1st	1st	1st				5
Costa Rica					R1					1
Croatia	2nd						2nd	4th	5th	4
Czech Republic					4th	6th				2
Georgia							5th		6th	2
Hungary	4th							3rd	2nd	3
Iran						7th				1
Italy	1st	2nd		4th		2nd				4
Japan	6th									1
Libya									4th	1
Mozambique							4th	5th		2
Paraguay			2nd							1
Poland	5th									1
Portugal					3rd		1st	1st	1st	4
Russia						3rd				1
Slovakia								2nd		1
Slovenia						5th				1
Spain	3rd	3rd								2
Switzerland							6th			1
United States		4th	4th	3rd						3
Uruguay					R1					1
Nations	6	6	5	5	6	8	6	6	6	

== General statistics ==
As 2008

Rank	Team	Part	Pld	W	D	L	GF	GA	Dif	Pts
3	Italy	4	18	10	3	5	70	36	+34	33
4	Croatia	4	16	9	1	6	76	50	+26	28
6	Spain	2	9	6	0	3	59	42	+17	18
5	Hungary	3	13	6	2	5	31	25	+6	20
11	Poland	1	5	2	0	3	23	25	–2	6
22	Japan	1	5	0	0	5	9	67	–58	0
9	United States	3	12	3	2	7	36	67	–31	11
19	Australia	2	4	0	1	3	10	32	–22	1
1	Brazil	5	23	21	2	0	109	26	+83	65
25	Argentina	5	?	?	?	?	?	?	?	?
8	Paraguay	1	5	4	1	6	27	46	–19	13
20	Belgium	2	8	0	1	7	13	37	–24	1
21	Uruguay	1	2	0	1	1	8	18	–10	1
10	Czech Republic	2	7	2	1	4	16	25	–9	7
2	Portugal	4	16	14	1	1	96	16	+80	43
23	Costa Rica	1	2	0	0	2	2	9	–7	0
14	Slovenia	1	4	1	1	2	9	12	–3	4
15	Russia	1	4	1	0	3	17	15	+2	3
16	Iran	1	4	1	0	3	17	15	+2	3
7	Angola	3	11	4	1	6	27	46	–19	13
17	Georgia	2	6	1	0	5	12	41	–29	3
12	Mozambique	2	7	2	0	5	50	45	+5	6
24	Switzerland	1	3	0	0	3	3	23	–20	0
13	Slovakia	1	4	2	0	2	13	14	–1	6
18	Libya	1	4	1	0	3	9	14	–5	3

Table as of July 2008. Source:
