= Duje Bajrušović =

Croatian futsal player

Bajrušović
Personal information
- Full name: Duje Bajrušović
- Date of birth: 27 October 1984 (age 42)
- Place of birth: Croatia
- Position: Pivot

Team information
- Current team: MNK Split

International career
Years	Team	Apps	(Gls)
- Croatia

Duje Bajrušović (born 27 October 1984), is a Croatian futsal player who plays for MNK Split Brodosplit Inženjering and the Croatia national futsal team.
