= Ivica Gvozden =

Croatian footballer and futsal player

Personal information
- Date of birth: 14 October 1968 (age 58)
- Place of birth: SFR Yugoslavia
- Position: Defender

Senior career*
Years	Team	Apps	(Gls)
1986–1990	Iskra Bugojno	25	(0)
1990–1993	Rad	61	(0)
1994–1995	Dinamo Zagreb	4	(0)
1996–1997	Chemnitzer FC	26	(1)
1998	Šibenik	14	(0)
2001–2002	Grude	27	(0)

International career
- Croatia futsal
- * Club domestic league appearances and goals

Ivica Gvozden (born 14 October 1968) is a Croatian retired football defender. He later also became a professional futsal player.

== Club career ==
After playing with NK Iskra Bugojno in the Yugoslav Second League since 1986, in 1990 he moved to Belgrade and signed with Yugoslav First League club FK Rad where he played until 1993. In 1994, he moved to Croatia and joined GNK Dinamo Zagreb, known as Croatia Zagreb back then. In 1996, he moved to Germany where he played with Chemnitzer FC one and a half seasons playing in the Regionalliga Nordost. During the winter break of the 1997–98 season, he returned to Croatia and signed with 1. HNL side HNK Šibenik. He played with HNK Grude in the 2001–02 Premier League of Bosnia and Herzegovina.

== Futsal career ==
Ivica Gvozden was part of the Croatia national futsal team at the 2001 UEFA Futsal Championship.
