= Hungary national futsal team =

Hungary
- Association: Magyar Labdarúgó Szövetség
- Confederation: UEFA (Europe)
- Head coach: Sergio Mullor Cabrera
- FIFA code: HUN
- FIFA ranking: 32 ▲6 (12 December 2025)
Home colours	Away colours

First international
- Hungary 8–3 Peru (Budapest, Hungary, November 18, 1986)

Biggest win
- Hungary 15–0 England (Gyöngyös, Hungary, February 29, 2008)

Biggest defeat
- Hungary 0–11 Spain (Budapest, Hungary, November 16, 1999)

FIFA World Cup
- Appearances: 1 (First in 1989)
- Best result: Second round (1989)

UEFA Futsal Championship
- Appearances: 3 (First in 2005)
- Best result: Group stage (2005, 2010, 2016)

Grand Prix de Futsal
- Appearances: 3 (First in 2007)
- Best result: Fourth place (2007)

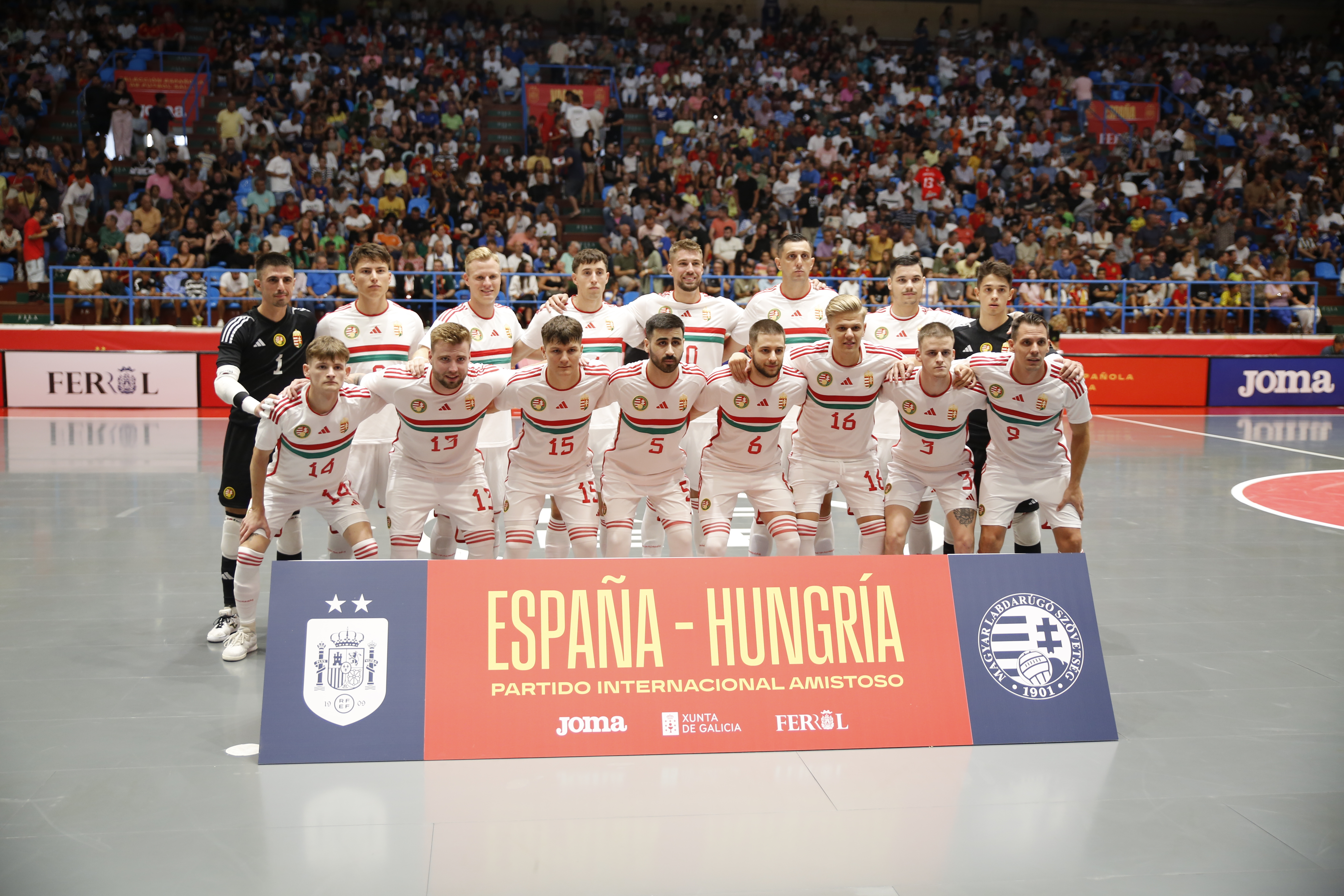
Hungary national futsal team in 2024.

The Hungary national futsal team represents Hungary in international futsal competitions such as the FIFA Futsal World Cup and the European Championships and is controlled by the Hungarian Football Federation.

== Tournament records ==
=== FIFA Futsal World Cup ===
FIFA World Cup record
Year	Round	Pld	W	D	L	GS	GA
(Netherlands) 1989	2nd round	6	2	2	2	23	17
(Hong Kong) 1992	Did not qualify						
(Spain) 1996	Did not qualify						
(Guatemala) 2000	Did not qualify						
(Chinese Taipei) 2004	Did not qualify						
(Brazil) 2008	Did not qualify						
(Thailand) 2012	Did not qualify						
(Colombia) 2016	Did not qualify						
(Lithuania) 2021	Did not qualify						
(Uzbekistan) 2024	Did not qualify						
Total:1/10	2nd round	6	2	2	2	23	17

=== UEFA European Futsal Championship ===
UEFA European Futsal Championship Record
Year	Round	Pld	W	D	L	GS	GA
(Spain) 1996	Did not qualify						
(Spain) 1999	Did not qualify						
(Russia) 2001	Did not qualify						
(Italy) 2003	Did not qualify						
(Czech Republic) 2005	Group stage	3	0	0	3	5	14
(Portugal) 2007	Did not qualify						
(Hungary) 2010	Group stage	2	0	0	2	6	9
(Croatia) 2012	Did not qualify						
(Belgium) 2014	Did not qualify						
(Serbia) 2016	Group stage	2	0	0	2	5	11
(Slovenia) 2018	Did not qualify						
(Netherlands) 2022	Did not qualify						
(Latvia) (Lithuania) (Slovenia) 2026	Group stage	2	1	0	1	5	7
Total:3/13	Group stage	9	1	0	8	21	41

=== Grand Prix de Futsal ===
Grand Prix de Futsal Record
Year	Round	Pld	W	D	L	GS	GA
(Brazil) 2005	Did not enter						
(Brazil) 2006	Did not enter						
(Brazil) 2007	Fourth place	6	3	1	2	18	16
(Brazil) 2008	Did not enter						
(Brazil) 2009	12th place	6	2	1	3	18	18
(Brazil) 2010	Did not enter						
(Brazil) 2011	10th place	6	3	0	3	20	20
(Brazil) 2013	Did not enter						
(Brazil) 2014	Did not enter						
(Brazil) 2015	Did not enter						
(Brazil) 2016	TBD	-	-	-	-	-	-
Total	3/11	18	8	2	8	56	54

=== Futsal Mundialito ===
Futsal Mundialito Record
Year	Round	Pld	W	D	L	GS	GA
(Italy) 1994	Fourth place	5	1	2	2	28	18
(Brazil) 1995	Did not enter						
(Brazil) 1996	Did not enter						
(Brazil) 1998	Did not enter						
(Brazil) 2001	Did not enter						
(Italy) 2002	Did not enter						
(Portugal) 2006	Did not enter						
(Portugal) 2007	Third place	4	2	0	2	19	11
(Portugal) 2008	Runners-up	4	3	0	1	12	14
Total	3/9	13	6	2	5	31	25

== Players ==
=== Current squad ===
Head coach: Sergio Mullor Cabrera
Federal coach: Tamás Frank
Federal coach: Péter Németh
Goalkeeper coach: Zoltán Balázs

No.	Pos.	Player	Date of birth (age)	Caps	Goals	Club
1	GK	Marcell Alasztics	10 February 1995 (aged 28)	62		(Hungarian Football Federation) Haladás VSE
12	GK	Gergő Samu Gémesi	20 June 2005 (aged 18)	2		(Hungarian Football Federation) Újpest FC-220Volt
2	DF	Benjámin Alex Dorogi	30 November 2002 (aged 20)	2		(Hungarian Football Federation) 1. Futsal Club Veszprém
3	FW	Bence Gábor Lux	3 February 2004 (aged 19)	2		(Hungarian Football Federation) 1. Futsal Club Veszprém
4	DF	Zoltán Szalmás	11 May 2002 (aged 21)	6		(Hungarian Football Federation) Haladás VSE
5	FW	Tamás Szentes-Bíró	2 June 1996 (aged 27)	9		(Hungarian Football Federation) Nyírbátori SC
6	DF	Imre Nagy	8 August 1993 (aged 30)	61		(Hungarian Football Federation) MVFC Berettyóújfalu
7	FW	Roland Bencsik	2 November 1995 (aged 27)	15		(Hungarian Football Federation) SG Kecskemét Futsal
8	FW	Ádám Vas	5 September 1995 (aged 28)	76		(Hungarian Football Federation) Haladás VSE
9	DF	János Rábl	15 June 1989 (aged 34)	137		(Hungarian Football Federation) MVFC Berettyóújfalu
10	FW	Patrik Krisztián Pál	8 June 1997 (aged 26)	46		(Hungarian Football Federation) SG Kecskemét Futsal
11	FW	Zoltán Dróth	14 September 1988 (aged 35)	153		(Hungarian Football Federation) Haladás VSE
13	FW	Gergő Sipos	25 May 1998 (aged 25)	12		(Hungarian Football Federation) Haladás VSE
14	FW	Kevin Tamás Nagy	7 December 2001 (aged 21)	2		(Hungarian Football Federation) MVFC Berettyóújfalu

== Results and fixtures ==
=== 2015 ===
10 December 2015 2016 FIFA Futsal World Cup qualification (UEFA)	Hungary	5 – 2	Belgium	Győr, Hungary
18:15	Rábl 5', 33'; Dróth 9'; Németh 22'; Dávid 39'	Report	Rahou 1'; Dujacquier 37'	Stadium: Magvassy Mihály Sportcsarnok; Referee: Sebastian Stawicki (Poland)

11 December 2015 2016 FIFA Futsal World Cup qualification (UEFA)	Hungary	5 – 4	England	Győr, Hungary
20:00	Hosszú 16'; Németh 20'; Szeghy 21'; Rábl 25'; Klacsák 35'	Report	Cook 30'; Medina 31'; Parkes 34'; Gay 40'	Stadium: Magvassy Mihály Sportcsarnok; Referee: Fredric Nilholt (Sweden)

13 December 2015 2016 FIFA Futsal World Cup qualification (UEFA)	Ukraine	5 – 3	Hungary	Győr, Hungary
18:15	Mykh. Grytsyna 3'; Ovsyannikov 19', 35'; Zhurba 22'; Valenko 38' (pen.)	Report	Dróth 5' (pen.); Hosszú 30'; Horváth 37'	Stadium: Magvassy Mihály Sportcsarnok; Referee: Sebastian Stawicki (Poland)

=== 2016 ===
22 January 2016 Friendly	Hungary	4 – 1	Lebanon	Dunaújváros, Hungary
21:00		Report

23 January 2016 Friendly	Hungary	4 – 2	Lebanon	Dunaújváros, Hungary
21:00		Report

2 February 2016 UEFA Futsal Euro 2016	Spain	5 – 2	Hungary	Belgrade, Serbia
21:00	Németh 8' (o.g.); Bebe 15'; Miguelín 20', 29'; Andresito 36'	Report	Dróth 24', 38'	Stadium: Belgrade Arena; Attendance: 10,828; Referee: Saša Tomić (Croatia)

4 February 2016 UEFA Futsal Euro 2016	Hungary	3 – 6	Ukraine	Belgrade, Serbia
21:00	Dróth 8', 34'; Trencsényi 30'	Report	D. Sorokin 2'; Bondar 7', 35'; Ovsyannikov 25'; Myko. Grytsyna 30'; Valenko 36'	Stadium: Belgrade Arena; Attendance: 11,012; Referee: Gerald Bauernfeind (Austria)

15 March 2016 Friendly	Hungary	2 – 0	Netherlands	Miskolc, Hungary
		Report		Stadium: Generali Arena

22 March 2016 2016 FIFA Futsal World Cup qualification (UEFA)	Hungary	0 – 3	Italy	Miskolc, Hungary
18:00		Report	Merlim 23', 34'; Fortino 24'	Stadium: Generali Arena; Referee: Admir Zahovič (Slovenia)

13 April 2016 2016 FIFA Futsal World Cup qualification (UEFA)	Italy	6 – 0	Hungary	Prato, Italy
20:30	Romano 3', 22'; Merlim 4'; Vinícius dos Santos 11'; Fortino 15'; Kaká 27'	Report		Stadium: Palaprato; Referee: Marc Birkett (England)
