= Josip Suton =

Croatian futsal player

Suton
Personal information
- Full name: Josip Suton
- Date of birth: 14 November 1988 (age 37)
- Place of birth: Mostar
- Position: Ala

Team information
- Current team: MNK Split

International career
Years	Team	Apps	(Gls)
- Croatia

Josip Suton (born 14 November 1988), is a Croatian futsal player who plays for MNK Split Brodosplit Inženjering and the Croatia national futsal team.
