= Tomáš Drahovský =

Slovak futsal player (born 1992)

Personal information
- Full name: Tomáš Drahovský
- Date of birth: 7 October 1992 (age 34)
- Place of birth: Stará Ľubovňa, Slovakia
- Height: 1.86 m (6 ft 1 in)
- Position: Universal

Team information
- Current team: Inter Movistar
- Number: 16

Senior career*
Years	Team	Apps	(Gls)
2009–2010	RCS Košice		
2010–2011	Benago Zruč nad Sázavou		
2011	PKP Košice		
2011–2015	Slov-Matic Bratislava	78	(96)
2015–2017	ETO Györ	62	(70)
2017–2018	FS Cartagena	30	(15)
2018–2020	Sparta Praha	59	(91)
2020–2022	Industrias Santa Coloma	43	(42)
2022–	Inter Movistar		

International career^{‡}
2013–	Slovakia	90	(58)
- * Club domestic league appearances and goals as of 29 January 2022 ‡ National team caps and goals as of 29 January 2022

Tomáš Drahovský (born 7 October 1992) is a Slovak futsal player who plays as a universal for Industrias Santa Coloma and the Slovakia national team.

== Honours ==
He was top scorer of the 2014–15 Slovak futsal league (40 goals in 26 games).

Drahovský was the Best Slovak Futsal player in six consecutive years (2014–2019). In March 2023, Drahovský was awarded the Best Slovak Futsal player for the eight time.

In June 2021, Drahovský became the top scorer of Spanish Primera División de Futsal for 2020-21 season with 29 goals in 32 games. In June 2021, became the best winger of Spanish League Primera Division de Futsal of the 2020–21 season.

=== Club ===
Slov-Matic Bratislava

- Slovak Futsal Extraliga: 2011–12, 2012–13, 2013–14, 2014-15

ETO Györ

- Nemzeti Bajnokság I: 2015–16, 2016–17

Sparta Praha

- Czech Futsal First League: 2018–19, 2019–20

Industrias Santa Coloma

- Primera División de Futsal Top Scorer: 2020–21
