= Slovak Football Association =

Governing body organizing association football in Slovakia

UEFA
- Founded: 4 November 1938
- Headquarters: Bratislava
- FIFA affiliation: 1939 (as Slovak Republic); 1994 (as Slovakia)
- UEFA affiliation: 1993
- President: Jan Kovačík
- Website: www.futbalsfz.sk

The Slovak Football Association (Slovak: Slovenský futbalový zväz, SFZ) is the governing body of Association football in Slovakia. The association has the responsibility for the control and development of football in Slovakia, and is the body that runs the Slovakia national football, and futsal teams.

== History ==
The Slovak Football Association was founded on 4 November 1938 and originally became a member of FIFA in 1939, but disbanded after World War II because Czech and Slovak football competitions were combined, and so did the national teams. Following the breakup of Czechoslovakia, the organization was reformed, joining UEFA in 1993, and rejoined FIFA in 1994.

The Slovak Football Association runs the Slovakia national football team, as well as male youth teams at under-21, under-19, under-18, under-17, under-16, and under-15 level. The association also organizes the Slovakia women's national football team and the Slovakia national futsal team.

== See also ==
- Slovakia national football team
- Slovakia women's national football team
