= 2006 Grand Prix de Futsal =

Tournament details
- Host country: Brazil
- Dates: 17 October – 21 October
- Teams: 6 (from 2 confederations)
- Venue(s): 1 (in 1 host city)

Final positions
- Champions: Brazil (2nd title)
- Runners-up: Italy
- Third place: Croatia
- Fourth place: Argentina

Tournament statistics
- Matches played: 16
- Goals scored: 71 (4.44 per match)

The 2006 Grand Prix de Futsal was the second edition of the international futsal competition of the same kind as the FIFA Futsal World Cup but with invited nations and held annually in Brazil.

== Venues ==
- Caxias do Sul/Rio Grande do Sul (BRA)
- Hall: Ginásio José Jacinto Maria de Godoy (SESI) - 5.000 seats

== Teams ==
=== Group A ===
- Argentina
- Brazil
- Chile

=== Group B ===
- Croatia
- Italy
- Czech Republic

== First round ==
=== Group A ===
| Team | Pld | W | D | L | GF | GA | Diff | Pts |
|---|---|---|---|---|---|---|---|---|
| Brazil | 2 | 2 | 0 | 0 | 9 | 0 | +9 | 6 |
| Argentina | 2 | 1 | 0 | 1 | 2 | 2 | 0 | 3 |
| Chile | 2 | 0 | 0 | 2 | 0 | 9 | −9 | 0 |

17 October
20:00

| Argentina | 2 – 0 | Chile |

Ginásio José Jacinto Maria de Godoy (SESI), Caxias do Sul/Rio Grande do Sul
18 October
19:15

| Brazil | 7 – 0 | Chile |

Ginásio José Jacinto Maria de Godoy (SESI), Caxias do Sul/Rio Grande do Sul
19 October
19:15

| Argentina | 0 – 2 | Brazil |

Ginásio José Jacinto Maria de Godoy (SESI), Caxias do Sul/Rio Grande do Sul

=== Group B ===
| Team | Pld | W | D | L | GF | GA | Diff | Pts |
|---|---|---|---|---|---|---|---|---|
| Italy | 2 | 1 | 1 | 0 | 10 | 5 | +5 | 4 |
| Croatia | 2 | 1 | 0 | 1 | 3 | 6 | −3 | 3 |
| Czech Republic | 2 | 0 | 1 | 1 | 4 | 6 | −2 | 1 |

17 October
18:30

| Italy | 4 – 4 | Czech Republic |

Ginásio José Jacinto Maria de Godoy (SESI), Caxias do Sul/Rio Grande do Sul
18 October
20:45

| Czech Republic | 0 – 2 | Croatia |

Ginásio José Jacinto Maria de Godoy (SESI), Caxias do Sul/Rio Grande do Sul
19 October
20:45

| Croatia | 1 – 6 | Italy |

Ginásio José Jacinto Maria de Godoy (SESI), Caxias do Sul/Rio Grande do Sul

== Second round ==
=== Classification 1st–4th ===
Semifinals
20 October
Brazil | 6
Croatia | 1
20 October
Italy | 2
Argentina | 0

Final
21 October
Brazil (aet) | 5
Italy | 3
3rd place
21 October
Croatia | 0 (4)
Argentina | 0 (3)

=== Semi-finals ===
20 October
17:00

| Brazil | 6 – 1 | Croatia |

Ginásio José Jacinto Maria de Godoy (SESI), Caxias do Sul/Rio Grande do Sul
20 October
18:30

| Italy | 2 – 0 | Argentina |

Ginásio José Jacinto Maria de Godoy (SESI), Caxias do Sul/Rio Grande do Sul

=== 3rd/4th place match ===
21 October
07:30

| Croatia | 0 – 0 (a.e.t.) | Argentina |
Penalties
| | 4 – 3 |

Ginásio José Jacinto Maria de Godoy (SESI), Caxias do Sul/Rio Grande do Sul

=== Final ===
21 October
09:30

| Brazil | 5 – 3 (a.e.t.) | Italy |

Ginásio José Jacinto Maria de Godoy (SESI), Caxias do Sul/Rio Grande do Sul

=== Winner ===
Grand Prix de Futsal
2006 winners

Brazil
Second title
