= Slovakia national futsal team =

Slovakia
- Shirt badge/Association crest
- Association: Slovenský futbalový zväz
- Confederation: UEFA (Europe)
- Head coach: Marián Berky
- Captain: Tomáš Drahovský
- FIFA code: SVK
- FIFA ranking: 37 ▲1 (8 May 2026)
Home colours	Away colours

First international
- CIS 8–3 Slovakia (Moscow, Russia; 21 March 1992)

Biggest win
- Slovakia 12–0 Austria (Trnava, Slovakia; 22 October 2003)

Biggest defeat
- Hungary 17–3 Slovakia (Szekszárd, Hungary; 20 March 1995)

AMF World Cup
- Appearances: 4 (First in 1994)
- Best result: 2nd Round (1994, 2000)

UEFA Futsal Championship
- Appearances: 1 (First in 2022)
- Best result: Quarter-final (2022)

The Slovakia national futsal team is controlled by the Slovak Football Association, the governing body for futsal in Slovakia and represents the country in international futsal competitions, such as the World Cup and the European Championships.

== Competition history ==
=== FIFA Futsal World Cup ===
- 1989 – did not compete
- 1992 – did not compete
- 1996 – did not qualify
- 2000 – did not qualify
- 2004 – did not qualify
- 2008 – did not qualify
- 2012 – did not qualify
- 2016 – did not qualify
- 2021 – did not qualify
- 2024 – did not qualify

=== UEFA Futsal Championship ===
- 1996 – did not compete
- 1999 – did not qualify
- 2001 – did not qualify
- 2003 – did not qualify
- 2005 – did not qualify
- 2007 – did not qualify
- 2010 – did not qualify
- 2012 – did not qualify
- 2014 – did not qualify
- 2016 – did not qualify
- 2018 – did not qualify
- 2022 – 8th place (quarter-finals)
- 2026 – did not qualify

=== Futsal Mundialito ===
- 1994 – did not compete
- 1995 – did not compete
- 1996 – did not compete
- 1998 – did not compete
- 2001 – did not compete
- 2002 – did not compete
- 2006 – did not compete
- 2007 – did not compete
- 2008 – did not compete

== Current squad ==
The following players were called up for UEFA Futsal Euro 2022.

No.	Pos.	Player	Date of birth (age)	Club
2	GK	Marek Karpiak	28 December 1997 (aged 24)	(Football Association of the Czech Republic) SK Slavia Praha
12	GK	Richard Oberman	7 July 1994 (aged 27)	(Slovak Football Association) Podpor pohyb Košice
4	DF	Peter Serbin	16 February 1989 (aged 32)	(Slovak Football Association) MIMEL Lučenec
5	DF	Gabriel Rick	17 November 1988 (aged 33)	(Football Association of the Czech Republic) SK Interobal Plzeň
6	DF	Matúš Ševčík	23 May 2000 (aged 21)	(Football Association of the Czech Republic) SK Slavia Praha
13	DF	Anton Brunovský	3 September 1989 (aged 32)	(Slovak Football Association) MIMEL Lučenec
7	MF	Martin Směřička	25 August 1994 (aged 27)	(Slovak Football Association) MIMEL Lučenec
8	MF	Martin Zdráhal	12 March 1993 (aged 28)	(Football Association of the Czech Republic) SK Interobal Plzeň
9	MF	Peter Kozář (captain)	17 November 1986 (aged 35)	(Football Association of the Czech Republic) SK Interobal Plzeň
10	MF	Martin Doša	18 July 1992 (aged 29)	(Football Association of the Czech Republic) FK Chrudim
16	MF	Tomáš Drahovský	7 October 1992 (aged 29)	(Royal Spanish Football Federation) Industrias Santa Coloma
11	FW	Patrik Zaťovič	9 July 1993 (aged 28)	(Polish Football Association) Piast Gliwice
14	FW	Daniel Čeřovský	19 February 1998 (aged 23)	(Slovak Football Association) MIMEL Lučenec
17	FW	Dominik Ostrák	16 April 1997 (aged 24)	(Slovak Football Association) MIMEL Lučenec
