= Vedran Matošević =

Croatian futsal player

Matošević
Personal information
- Full name: Vedran Matošević
- Date of birth: 27 August 1990 (age 36)
- Place of birth: Travnik, Bosnia and Herzegovina
- Position: Ala

Team information
- Current team: Nacional Zagreb
- Number: 2

Senior career*
Years	Team	Apps	(Gls)
2007–2012	Uspinjača Zagreb		
2012–2014	Alumnus Zagreb		
2014	Luparense		
2014–2015	PesaroFano		

International career^{‡}
2009–	Croatia	55	(13)
- * Club domestic league appearances and goals ‡ National team caps and goals as of 25 November 2019

Vedran Matošević (born 27 August 1990) is a Croatian futsal player who plays for Nacional Zagreb and the Croatian national futsal team. Vedran retired from professional futsal end of 2022. Nowadays, Vedran works as full-time mobile app Android developer and leads futsal club for youngsters Zagi with more than 60+ kids.
