= Tihomir Novak =

Croatian futsal player

Personal information
- Full name: Tihomir Novak
- Date of birth: 24 October 1986 (age 40)
- Place of birth: Croatia

Team information
- Current team: Futsal Dinamo
- Number: 10

International career
Years	Team	Apps	(Gls)
2007–	Croatia	91	(33)

Tihomir Novak (born 24 October 1986) is a Croatian futsal player who plays for Futsal Dinamo and the Croatia national futsal team.
