= 2007 Futsal Mundialito =

Tournament details
- Host country: Portugal
- Dates: 4–8 July 2007
- Teams: 6 (from 2 confederations)
- Venue(s): 1 (in 1 host city)

Final positions
- Champions: Portugal (2nd title)
- Runners-up: Slovakia
- Third place: Hungary
- Fourth place: Croatia

Tournament statistics
- Matches played: 11
- Goals scored: 89 (8.09 per match)
- Top scorer(s): (Hungary) Tamas Lódi (8)
- Best player(s): (Portugal) Arnaldo Pereira
- All statistics correct as of 12 February 2009.

The 2007 Futsal Mundialito was an international friendly championship in futsal. The tournament was held in Algarve, Portugal from 4 to 8 of July 2007. The championship was played in Praia da Alagoa.

== Tournament ==
=== 1st round ===
==== Group A ====
===== Standing =====
Team	Pld	W	D	L	GF	GA	GD	Pts
Portugal	2	2	0	0	12	4	+8	6
Slovakia	2	1	0	1	7	4	+3	3
Mozambique	2	0	0	2	4	15	-11	0

===== Matches =====
Match No.	Date	Team 1	Score	Team 2
1	2008-07-04	Portugal	3 - 1	Slovakia
2	2008-07-05	Mozambique	3 - 9	Portugal
3	2008-07-06	Slovakia	6 - 1	Mozambique

==== Group B ====
===== Standing =====
Team	Pld	W	D	L	GF	GA	GD	Pts
Croatia	2	2	0	0	10	4	+6	6
Hungary	2	1	0	1	9	3	+6	3
Angola	2	0	0	2	2	14	-12	0

===== Matches =====
Match No.	Date	Team 1	Score	Team 2
1	2008-07-04	Hungary	7 - 0	Angola
2	2008-07-05	Croatia	3 - 2	Hungary
3	2008-07-06	Angola	2 - 7	Croatia

=== Knockout stage ===
Semi-finals
7 July
Portugal	5
Hungary	1
7 July
Croatia	4
Slovakia	5

Final
8 July
Portugal	6
Slovakia	1
Third place
8 July
Hungary	9
Croatia	3

==== 5th & 6th Places ====
Date	Team 1	Score	Team 2
2008-07-07	Mozambique	6 - 5	Angola

== Honors ==
2007 Algarve International
Futsal Tournament Winners
Portugal
2nd Title

- Best Player: Arnaldo Pereira - Portugal
- Best Goalkeeper: João Benedito - Portugal
- Top Goal Scorer: Tamas Lódi - Hungary (8)
- Fair-Play Team: Hungary

== Sources ==
Futsal Planet
