= 2007 Grand Prix de Futsal =

Tournament details
- Host country: Brazil
- Dates: 20–27 October
- Teams: 15 (from 5 confederations)
- Venue(s): 3 (in 3 host cities)

Final positions
- Champions: Brazil (3rd title)
- Runners-up: Iran
- Third place: Argentina
- Fourth place: Hungary

Tournament statistics
- Matches played: 54
- Goals scored: 377 (6.98 per match)

The 2007 Grand Prix de Futsal was the third edition of the international futsal tournament of the same kind as the FIFA Futsal World Cup but with invited nations that took place between 20 and 27 October 2007, in Santa Catarina, Brazil, in three locations:

- Joinville (Hall: Centreventos Cau Hansen)
- Lages (Hall: Ginásio Jonas Minosso)
- Jaraguá do Sul (Hall: Arena Jaraguá)

== First stage ==
=== Group A ===
Team	Pld	W	D	L	GF	GA	Diff	Pts
Brazil	3	3	0	0	37	1	+36	9
Belgium	3	2	0	1	11	9	+2	6
Mozambique	3	1	0	2	12	16	–4	3
Canada	3	0	0	3	0	34	–34	0

=== Group B ===
Team	Pld	W	D	L	GF	GA	Diff	Pts
Iran	3	2	0	1	10	8	+2	6
Slovenia	3	1	2	0	10	8	+2	5
Uzbekistan	3	1	1	1	5	6	–1	4
Paraguay	3	0	1	2	10	12	–2	1

=== Group C ===
Team	Pld	W	D	L	GF	GA	Diff	Pts
Argentina	2	2	0	0	18	1	+17	6
Egypt	2	1	0	1	9	3	+6	3
Chile	2	0	0	2	1	24	–23	0

=== Group D ===
Team	Pld	W	D	L	GF	GA	Diff	Pts
Hungary	3	2	1	0	9	5	+4	7
Uruguay	3	1	1	1	8	9	–1	4
Netherlands	3	0	3	0	6	6	0	3
Angola	3	0	1	2	6	9	–3	1

== Second stage ==
Jaraguá do Sul

Quarterfinals
24 October
Iran	6
Uruguay	3
24 October
Argentina (a.e.t.)	2
Belgium	1
24 October
Brazil	7
Egypt	3
24 October
Hungary	3
Slovenia	1

Semifinals
25 October
Iran	3
Argentina	2
25 October
Brazil	5
Hungary	2

Final
27 October
Iran	0
Brazil	4
3rd place
26 October
Hungary	4
Argentina (a.e.t.)	5

Semifinals
25 October
Uruguay	1
Belgium	4
25 October
Egypt	2
Slovenia (a.e.t.)	4

5th place
26 October
Belgium	4
Slovenia	1
7th place
26 October
Uruguay	5
Egypt	2

=== Quarterfinals ===
2007-10-24
14:00

Iran	6–3	Uruguay

Arena Jaraguá, Jaraguá do Sul
2007-10-24
15:30

Hungary	3–1	Slovenia

Arena Jaraguá, Jaraguá do Sul
2007-10-24
17:30

Argentina	2–1 (a.e.t.)	Belgium

Arena Jaraguá, Jaraguá do Sul
2007-10-24
20:00

Brazil	7–3	Egypt

Arena Jaraguá, Jaraguá do Sul

=== Semifinals ===
5th/8th Place

2007-10-25
13:00

Uruguay	1–4	Belgium

Arena Jaraguá, Jaraguá do Sul
2007-10-25
15:00

Egypt	2–4 (a.e.t.)	Slovenia

Arena Jaraguá, Jaraguá do Sul

1st/4th Place

2007-10-25
17:00

Iran	3–2	Argentina

Arena Jaraguá, Jaraguá do Sul
2007-10-25
19:15

Brazil	5–2	Hungary

Arena Jaraguá, Jaraguá do Sul

=== Finals ===
7th/8th Place Match

2007-10-26
12:00

Uruguay	5–2	Egypt

Arena Jaraguá, Jaraguá do Sul

5th/6th Place Match

2007-10-26
14:00

Belgium	4–1	Slovenia

Arena Jaraguá, Jaraguá do Sul

3rd/4th Place Match

2007-10-26
16:00

Hungary	4–5 (a.e.t.)	Argentina

Arena Jaraguá, Jaraguá do Sul

1st/2nd Place Match

2007-10-27
10:00

Brazil	4–0	Iran

Arena Jaraguá, Jaraguá do Sul

== Winner ==
Grand Prix de Futsal
2007 winners

Brazil
Third title
