= FC Split Tommy =

Split
- Full name: Malonogometni klub Split
- Founded: 1985
- Ground: Arena Gripe, Split, Croatia
- Capacity: 2,500
- Chairman: (Croatia) Ivo Zoković
- Manager: (Croatia) Antun Bačić
- League: 2.HMNL
Home colours	Away colours

Malonogometni klub Split, previously known as MNK Split Brodosplit Inženjering and Fc Split Tommy, is a futsal club based in Split, Croatia.

== Honours ==
Croatian League:

- 1996/97
- 2000/01
- 2001/02
- 2002/03
- 2003/04
- 2005/06
- 2010/11
- 2011/12

Croatian Futsal Cup:

- 2000/01
- 2001/02
- 2002/03
- 2004/05
- 2005/06
- 2010/11
- 2011/12
- 2013/14
- 2015/16

== UEFA Club Competitions Record ==
=== UEFA Futsal Cup ===
Season	Competition	Round	Country	Opponent	Result	Venue
2001/02	UEFA Futsal Cup	Qualifying Round	(Belarus)	Simurg Minsk	7–0	Split
2001/02	UEFA Futsal Cup	Qualifying Round	(Greece)	Doukas	3–0	Split
2001/02	UEFA Futsal Cup	Qualifying Round	(Lithuania)	FK Inkaras	3–1	Split
2001/02	UEFA Futsal Cup	Final Round	(Italy)	BNL Roma	2–0	Lisbon
2001/02	UEFA Futsal Cup	Final Round	(Portugal)	Sporting CP	0–0	Lisbon
2001/02	UEFA Futsal Cup	Final Round	(Bosnia and Herzegovina)	Kaskada Granica	6–2	Lisbon
2001/02	UEFA Futsal Cup	Semifinal	(Belgium)	Action 21	3–7	Lisbon
2002/03	UEFA Futsal Cup	First Round	(Netherlands)	De Hommel	3–1	
2002/03	UEFA Futsal Cup	First Round	(Czech Republic)	Jistebnik	4–1	
2002/03	UEFA Futsal Cup	Second Round	(Spain)	Interviú	1–13	Charleroi
2002/03	UEFA Futsal Cup	Second Round	(Russia)	Norilsky Nickel	3–4	Charleroi
2002/03	UEFA Futsal Cup	Second Round	(Belgium)	Action 21	0–4	Charleroi
2003/04	UEFA Futsal Cup	First Round	(Finland)	Golden FT	9–0	
2003/04	UEFA Futsal Cup	First Round	(Romania)	Odorheiu	5–1	
2003/04	UEFA Futsal Cup	First Round	(Belarus)	Dorozhnik Minsk	5–2	
2003/04	UEFA Futsal Cup	Second Round	(Belgium)	Action 21	0–6	
2003/04	UEFA Futsal Cup	Second Round	(Portugal)	Benfica	0–7	
2003/04	UEFA Futsal Cup	Second Round	(Italy)	Prato	1–2	
2004/05	UEFA Futsal Cup	First Round	(Kazakhstan)	Kairat	0–5	Skopje
2004/05	UEFA Futsal Cup	First Round	(Belarus)	Dorozhnik Minsk	4–4	Skopje
2004/05	UEFA Futsal Cup	First Round	(North Macedonia)	KMF Skopje	4–3	Skopje
2006/07	UEFA Futsal Cup	Main Round	(Azerbaijan)	Araz Naxçivan	3–5	Split
2006/07	UEFA Futsal Cup	Main Round	(Sweden)	Skövde	5–1	Split
2006/07	UEFA Futsal Cup	Main Round	(Greece)	Athina 90	6–3	Split
2006/07	UEFA Futsal Cup	Elite Round	(Italy)	Arzignano Grifo	3–5	Verona
2006/07	UEFA Futsal Cup	Elite Round	(Spain)	Interviú	0–6	Verona
2006/07	UEFA Futsal Cup	Elite Round	(Czech Republic)	Jistebník	5–1	Verona
2011/12	UEFA Futsal Cup	Main Round	(Romania)	City'us	1–4	Târgu Mureş
2011/12	UEFA Futsal Cup	Main Round	(Italy)	Marca Futsal	1–4	Târgu Mureş
2011/12	UEFA Futsal Cup	Main Round	(Finland)	Ilves	4–2	Târgu Mureş

== Players ==
- (Croatia) Luka Pavlović
- (Croatia) Duje Vladović
- (Croatia) Vicko Radić
- (Croatia) Mario Taći
- (Croatia) Robert Vinko Pavičić
- (Croatia) Davor Milanko
- (Croatia) Ivan Bezmalonović
- (Croatia) Nikola Moro
- (Croatia) Marin Musinov

== Notable former players ==
- (Croatia) Nikola Tomičić
- (Croatia) Aljoša Staničić
- (Croatia) Alen Delpont
- (Croatia) Nikola Čizmić
- (Croatia) Dario Marinović
- (Croatia) Ivo Jukić
- (Croatia) Franco Jelovčić
- (Slovenia) Alen Fetič
- (Croatia) Toni Kirevski
- (Croatia) Branko Laura
- (Croatia) Nikola Pavić
- (Brazil) Genário Benício Peixoto
- (Croatia) Alen Marić
- (Croatia) Alen Protega
- (Croatia) Saša Subotić

== Famous players ==
- (Croatia) Robert Jarni
- (Croatia) Nikola Tomičić
- (Croatia) Toni Kirevski

== See also ==
- Futsal in Croatia
