= 2008 Futsal Mundialito =

Tournament details
- Host country: Portugal
- Dates: 2–6 July 2008
- Teams: 6 (from 2 confederations)
- Venue(s): 1 (in 1 host city)

Final positions
- Champions: Portugal (3rd title)
- Runners-up: Hungary
- Third place: Angola
- Fourth place: Libya

Tournament statistics
- Matches played: 11
- Goals scored: 77 (7 per match)
- Top scorer(s): (Angola) Arione Coelho
- Best player(s): (Portugal) Pedro Costa
- All statistics correct as of 12 February 2009.

The 2008 Futsal Mundialito was an international friendly championship in futsal. The tournament was held in Algarve, Portugal from 2 to 6 of July 2008. The championship was played in Praia da Alagoa.

== Tournament ==
=== 1st round ===
==== Group A ====
===== Standing =====
Team	Pld	W	D	L	GF	GA	GD	Pts
Portugal	2	2	0	0	22	1	+21	6
Libya	2	1	0	1	4	5	-1	3
Georgia	2	0	0	2	2	26	-24	0

===== Matches =====
Match No.	Date	Team 1	Score	Team 2
1	2008-07-02	Libya	4 - 1	Georgia
2	2008-07-03	Portugal	4 - 0	Libya
3	2008-07-04	Georgia	1 - 18	Portugal

==== Group B ====
===== Standing =====
Team	Pld	W	D	L	GF	GA	GD	Pts
Hungary	2	2	0	0	8	4	+4	6
Angola	2	1	0	1	7	5	+2	3
Croatia	2	0	0	2	2	8	-6	0

===== Matches =====
Match No.	Date	Team 1	Score	Team 2
1	2008-07-02	Croatia	1 - 4	Hungary
2	2008-07-03	Hungary	4 - 3	Angola
3	2008-07-04	Angola	4 - 1	Croatia

=== Knockout stage ===
Semi-finals
5 July
Hungary	4
Libya	3
5 July
Portugal	5
Angola	0

Final
6 July
Portugal	7
Hungary	0
Third place
6 July
Angola	5
Libya	2

==== 5th & 6th Places ====
Date	Team 1	Score	Team 2
2008-07-05	Georgia	1 - 5	Croatia

== Honors ==
2008 Algarve International
Futsal Tournament Winners
Portugal
3rd Title

- Best Player: Pedro Costa - Portugal
- Best Goalkeeper: Mohammed Al-Sharif - Libya
- Top Goal Scorer: Arione Coelho - Angola
- Fair-Play Team: Portugal

== Sources ==
Futsal Planet
