= Alex Merlim =

Italian futsal player

Personal information
- Full name: Alex Rodrigo da Silva Merlim
- Date of birth: 15 July 1986 (age 40)
- Place of birth: Dourados, Brazil
- Height: 1.71 m (5 ft 7 in)
- Position: Winger

Team information
- Current team: Sporting CP
- Number: 29

Senior career*
Years	Team	Apps	(Gls)
- Despachante MS
- Corte Aço
–2005	Comercial Mariano		
2006	Bebedouro SP		
2007	Santa Fé		
2007–2011	Augusta		
2011–2015	Luparense		
2015–	Sporting CP	125	(62)

International career^{‡}
2010–	Italy	77	(28)
- * Club domestic league appearances and goals as of 00:00, 12 August 2018 (UTC) ‡ National team caps and goals as of 15:00, 1 April 2019 (UTC)

Alex Rodrigo da Silva Merlim (born 15 July 1986), also known as Babalu, is a futsal player who plays for Sporting CP. Born in Brazil, he represents the Italian national futsal team as a winger.

== Honours ==
- Liga Portuguesa: 2015–16, 2016–17, 2017–18, 2020–21, 2021–22, 2022–23, 2023-24
- Taça de Portugal: 2015–16, 2017–18, 2018–19, 2019–20, 2021–22
- Taça da Liga de Futsal: 2015–16, 2017–18, 2020–21, 2021–22
- Supertaça de Futsal: 2017, 2018, 2021, 2022, 2025
- UEFA Futsal Champions League: 2018–19, 2020–21, 2025–26
