= Dario Marinović =

Croatian futsal player (born 1990)

Personal information
- Full name: Dario Marinović
- Date of birth: 24 May 1990 (age 36)
- Place of birth: Dubrovnik, Croatia
- Position: Ala

Team information
- Current team: Jimbee Cartagena

International career^{‡}
Years	Team	Apps	(Gls)
2008–2017	Croatia	74	(59)
- ‡ National team caps and goals as of 25 November 2019

Dario Marinović (born 24 May 1990), is a Croatian futsal player who plays for Jimbee Cartagena and the Croatia national futsal team.
