= Franco Jelovčić =

Croatian futsal player

Personal information
- Full name: Franco Jelovčić
- Date of birth: 6 July 1991 (age 35)
- Place of birth: Šibenik, Croatia
- Position: Ala

Team information
- Current team: MNK Torcida Split
- Number: 19

International career^{‡}
Years	Team	Apps	(Gls)
2011–	Croatia	82	(51)
Medal record
Men's futsal
Representing Croatia
UEFA Futsal Championship
Bronze medal – third place	2026 Latvia / Lithuania / Slovenia
- ‡ National team caps and goals as of 31 December 2020

Franco Jelovčić (born 6 July 1991) is a Croatian futsal player who plays for MNK Torcida Split and the Croatia national futsal team.
