= 2016 FIFA Futsal World Cup qualification (UEFA) =

Tournament details
- Dates: 22 October 2015 – 13 April 2016
- Teams: 45 (from 1 confederation)

Tournament statistics
- Matches played: 89
- Goals scored: 539 (6.06 per match)
- Top scorer: (Portugal) Cardinal (8 goals)

The UEFA qualifying competition for the 2016 FIFA Futsal World Cup was a men's futsal competition that determined the seven European national teams taking part in the final tournament in Colombia.

The national teams from a total of 45 UEFA member associations entered the qualifying competition. Denmark, Gibraltar, Sweden and Wales made their FIFA Futsal World Cup qualifying debuts.

== Format ==
The qualifying competition consisted of three rounds:

- Preliminary round: The 23 lowest-ranked teams were drawn into five groups of four teams and one group of three teams. Each group was played in single round-robin format at one of the teams which were pre-selected as hosts (if a group was drawn without pre-selected hosts, the hosts were selected afterwards by agreement or draw by UEFA). The six group winners advanced to the main round.
- Main round: The 28 teams (22 highest-ranked teams and six preliminary round qualifiers) were drawn into seven groups of four teams. Each group was played in single round-robin format at one of the teams which were pre-selected as hosts. The seven group winners and the seven runners-up advanced to the play-offs.
- Play-offs: The 14 teams were drawn into seven ties to play home-and-away two-legged matches to determine the seven qualified teams.

=== Tiebreakers ===
In the preliminary round and main round, the teams were ranked according to points (3 points for a win, 1 point for a draw, 0 points for a loss). If two or more teams were equal on points on completion of a mini-tournament, the following tie-breaking criteria were applied, in the order given, to determine the rankings:

1. Higher number of points obtained in the mini-tournament matches played among the teams in question;
2. Superior goal difference resulting from the mini-tournament matches played among the teams in question;
3. Higher number of goals scored in the mini-tournament matches played among the teams in question;
4. If, after having applied criteria 1 to 3, teams still had an equal ranking, criteria 1 to 3 were reapplied exclusively to the mini-tournament matches between the teams in question to determine their final rankings. If this procedure did not lead to a decision, criteria 5 to 10 applied;
5. Superior goal difference in all mini-tournament matches;
6. Higher number of goals scored in all mini-tournament matches;
7. If only two teams had the same number of points, and they were tied according to criteria 1 to 6 after having met in the last round of the mini-tournament, their rankings were determined by a penalty shoot-out (not used if more than two teams had the same number of points, or if their rankings were not relevant for qualification for the next stage).
8. Lower disciplinary points total based only on yellow and red cards received in the mini-tournament matches (red card = 3 points, yellow card = 1 point, expulsion for two yellow cards in one match = 3 points);
9. Coefficient ranking;
10. Drawing of lots.

In the play-offs, the team that scored more goals on aggregate over the two legs qualified for the final tournament. If the aggregate score was level, the away goals rule was applied, i.e., the team that scored more goals away from home over the two legs advanced. If away goals were also equal, extra time was played. The away goals rule was again applied after extra time, i.e., if there were goals scored during extra time and the aggregate score was still level, the visiting team advanced by virtue of more away goals scored. If no goals were scored during extra time, the tie was decided by penalty shoot-out.

== Schedule ==
The qualifying matches were played on the following dates.

Stage	Dates
Preliminary round	22–25 October 2015
Main round	10–13 December 2015
Play-offs	22 March & 12 April 2016

== Entrants ==
The teams were ranked according to their coefficient ranking, calculated based on the following:

- UEFA Futsal Euro 2012 final tournament and qualifying competition
- 2012 FIFA Futsal World Cup final tournament and qualifying competition
- UEFA Futsal Euro 2014 final tournament and qualifying competition

The 22 highest-ranked teams entered the main round, while the 23 lowest-ranked teams entered the preliminary round. The coefficient ranking was also used for seeding in the preliminary round and main round draws.

Teams entering main round

Seeding position 1
Team	Coeff	Rank
Spain	8.410	1
Italy (H)	8.278	2
Russia	8.167	3
Portugal (H)	7.000	4
Ukraine	5.889	5
Croatia (H)	4.667	6
Czech Republic (H)	4.528	7

Seeding position 2
Team	Coeff	Rank
Serbia	4.528	8
Romania	4.444	9
Slovenia	4.167	10
Azerbaijan	3.722	11
Hungary (H)	2.667	12
Slovakia	2.556	13
Netherlands (H)	2.167	14

Seeding position 3
Team	Coeff	Rank
Belarus	2.111	15
Belgium	1.944	16
Bosnia and Herzegovina	1.778	17
Turkey (H)	1.722	18
Kazakhstan	1.667	19
Poland	1.444	20
North Macedonia	1.333	21

Seeding position 4
Team	Coeff	Rank
Norway	1.222	22

Teams entering preliminary round

Seeding position 1
Team	Coeff	Rank
Latvia	1.167	23
France	1.056	24
Finland	1.000	25
Georgia	0.917	26
Greece	0.833	27
Israel (H)	0.833	28

Seeding position 2
Team	Coeff	Rank
Moldova	0.694	29
England	0.667	30
Montenegro	0.611	31
Lithuania (H)	0.611	32
Bulgaria	0.611	33
Armenia	0.444	34

Seeding position 3
Team	Coeff	Rank
Andorra	0.389	35
Albania	0.389	36
Sweden	0.333	37
Cyprus (H)	0.333	38
Denmark	0.222	39
Switzerland	0.222	40

Seeding position 4
Team	Coeff	Rank
Gibraltar	0.111	42
Estonia	0.000	43
Wales	0.000	44
Malta	0.000	45
San Marino	0.000	46

Notes

- Iceland (Coeff: 0.222; Rank 41), Republic of Ireland (Coeff: 0.000; Rank 47), Austria (no rank), Faroe Islands (no rank), Germany (no rank), Liechtenstein (no rank), Luxembourg (no rank), Northern Ireland (no rank), and Scotland (no rank) did not enter.
- Gibraltar entered despite being a non-FIFA member and thus ineligible for the World Cup.
- Teams which were pre-selected as preliminary round or main round hosts were denoted by (H). As only three teams were pre-selected as preliminary round hosts, three preliminary round groups were drawn without pre-selected hosts, and the hosts would be selected afterwards by agreement or draw by UEFA.

The draws for the preliminary round and main round were held on 2 July 2015, 14:30 CEST (UTC+2), at the UEFA headquarters in Nyon, Switzerland. Each group in the preliminary round and main round contained one team from each of the seeding positions 1–4, except for one group in the preliminary round which contained one team from each of the seeding positions 1–3. The six teams which qualified from the preliminary round, whose identity was not known at the time of the draw, were placed in seeding position 4 for the main round draw. In the preliminary round draw, the teams which were pre-selected as hosts could not be drawn in the same group, while in the main round draw, the teams which were pre-selected as hosts were drawn from a separate pot, while being placed in their groups according to their seeding positions.

== Preliminary round ==
Times were CEST (UTC+2), except for matches on 25 October 2015 which were CET (UTC+1).

=== Group A ===
Pos	Team	Pld	W	D	L	GF	GA	GD	Pts	Qualification
1	Moldova (H)	3	2	1	0	21	4	+17	7	Main round
2	Georgia	3	2	1	0	20	4	+16	7	
3	Andorra	3	1	0	2	5	12	−7	3	
4	Gibraltar	3	0	0	3	5	31	−26	0	

Source: UEFA
Rules for classification: Qualification tiebreakers
(H) Hosts
22 October 2015
15:00

Georgia	15–1	Gibraltar
Kobaidze 4'; Jvarashvili 5', 23'; Tikurishvili 7', 25'; Sigunava 11'; Nikvashvili 14', 34'; Lukava 20', 20'; Bukia 22'; Kakabadze 29'; Todua 36', 37'; Maisaia 39'	Report	Lopez 19' (pen.)

FMF Arena, Ciorescu
Referee: Nikola Jelić (Croatia), Victor Berg-Audic (France)
22 October 2015
17:30

Moldova	7–0	Andorra
Obadă 3', 14', 30'; Ţîmbalist 4'; Munteanu 12'; Negara 16', 32'	Report

FMF Arena, Ciorescu
Referee: Ondřej Černý (Czech Republic), Maksim Dzeikala (Belarus)

23 October 2015
15:00

Andorra	1–3	Georgia
Barbosa 38'	Report	Todua 9'; Tikurishvili 31', 34'

FMF Arena, Ciorescu
Referee: Maksim Dzeikala (Belarus), Nikola Jelić (Croatia)
23 October 2015
17:30

Moldova	12–2	Gibraltar
Hilotii 5', 23', 35', 40'; Obadă 8', 14', 39'; Laşcu 14', 14'; Burdujel 26'; Munteanu 30'; Negara 33'	Report	Walker 2'; Chipol 38'

FMF Arena, Ciorescu
Referee: Victor Berg-Audic (France), Ondřej Černý (Czech Republic)

25 October 2015
15:00

Gibraltar	2–4	Andorra
I. Robba 7'; Lopez 28'	Report	Llamas 16', 18'; Barbosa 30', 32'

FMF Arena, Ciorescu
Referee: Maksim Dzeikala (Belarus), Victor Berg-Audic (France)
25 October 2015
17:30

Georgia	2–2	Moldova
Kakabadze 30'; Tikurishvili 33'	Report	Hilotii 15'; Tacot 23'

FMF Arena, Ciorescu
Referee: Ondřej Černý (Czech Republic), Nikola Jelić (Croatia)

=== Group B ===
Pos	Team	Pld	W	D	L	GF	GA	GD	Pts	Qualification
1	Sweden (H)	3	2	1	0	16	8	+8	7	Main round
2	Greece	3	2	0	1	8	8	0	6	
3	Montenegro	3	1	1	1	9	8	+1	4	
4	San Marino	3	0	0	3	5	14	−9	0	

Source: UEFA
Rules for classification: Qualification tiebreakers
(H) Hosts
22 October 2015
16:30

Greece	2–1	San Marino
Kondylatos 13'; Gkaifyllias 19'	Report	Michelotti 35'

Agnebergshallen, Uddevalla
Referee: Kaloyan Kirilov (Bulgaria), Septimiu Burtescu (Romania)
22 October 2015
19:00

Sweden	3–3	Montenegro
Chekroun 8'; H. Abraham 9'; Mönell 30'	Report	Gurzaković 17'; Drašković 17'; Bajović 35'

Agnebergshallen, Uddevalla
Referee: Gábor Kovács (Hungary), Damian Jaruchiewicz (Poland)

23 October 2015
16:30

Montenegro	3–5	Greece
Drašković 5', 31'; Gojković 5'	Report	Mantis 3'; Gkaifyllias 7'; Panou 34'; Malovits 36'; Katevtsian 38'

Agnebergshallen, Uddevalla
Referee: Septimiu Burtescu (Romania), Gábor Kovács (Hungary)
23 October 2015
19:00

Sweden	9–4	San Marino
Asp 6'; S. Abraham 7', 9'; Mönell 9', 17'; Legiec 10', 40'; Hiseni 31'; Kuhi 40'	Report	Moretti 7'; Barducci 20'; Michelotti 22'; Pasqualini 35'

Agnebergshallen, Uddevalla
Referee: Damian Jaruchiewicz (Poland), Kaloyan Kirilov (Bulgaria)

25 October 2015
14:30

San Marino	0–3	Montenegro
	Report	Drašković 18', 28'; Mugoša 40'

Agnebergshallen, Uddevalla
Referee: Septimiu Burtescu (Romania), Kaloyan Kirilov (Bulgaria)
25 October 2015
17:00

Greece	1–4	Sweden
V. Asimakopoulos 33'	Report	Mönell 6', 15'; H. Abraham 16'; Eteus 26'

Agnebergshallen, Uddevalla
Referee: Gábor Kovács (Hungary), Damian Jaruchiewicz (Poland)

=== Group C ===
Pos	Team	Pld	W	D	L	GF	GA	GD	Pts	Qualification
1	France	3	3	0	0	15	2	+13	9	Main round
2	Albania	3	2	0	1	11	6	+5	6	
3	Lithuania (H)	3	1	0	2	4	12	−8	3	
4	Malta	3	0	0	3	6	16	−10	0	

Source: UEFA
Rules for classification: Qualification tiebreakers
(H) Hosts
22 October 2015
14:30

France	8–2	Malta
Rabei 7'; Bensaber 11'; Gasmi 13', 22', 35'; Ramirez 28'; A. Mohammed 30'; Aigoun 38'	Report	Stivala 20'; Musu 33'

Kaunas Sports Hall, Kaunas
Referee: Dejan Nikolić (Slovenia), Sreten Vasić (Serbia)
22 October 2015
18:00

Lithuania	2–5	Albania
Jeremejev 4'; Garšvinskas 40'	Report	Mejzini 31'; Begaj 31'; Halimi 39'; Brahimi 39'; Hasaj 40'

Kaunas Sports Hall, Kaunas
Referee: Kamil Çetin (Turkey), Olli Niemelä (Finland)

23 October 2015
16:00

Lithuania	2–1	Malta
Stradalovas 12'; Leščius 36'	Report	Milijic 6'

Kaunas Sports Hall, Kaunas
Referee: Sreten Vasić (Serbia), Kamil Çetin (Turkey)
23 October 2015
19:30

Albania	0–1	France
	Report	A. Mohammed 2'

Kaunas Sports Hall, Kaunas
Referee: Olli Niemelä (Finland), Dejan Nikolić (Slovenia)

25 October 2015
10:00

Malta	3–6	Albania
Mangion 12'; Saliba 25'; Milijic 38'	Report	Brahimi 9', 37'; Karaja 12'; Halimi 19' (pen.), 23'; Begaj 33'

Kaunas Sports Hall, Kaunas
Referee: Dejan Nikolić (Slovenia), Olli Niemelä (Finland)
25 October 2015
13:00

France	6–0	Lithuania
Hamdoud 6', 21'; Belhaj 12'; A. Mohammed 20', 20'; Aigoun 27'	Report

Kaunas Sports Hall, Kaunas
Referee: Kamil Çetin (Turkey), Sreten Vasić (Serbia)

=== Group D ===
Pos	Team	Pld	W	D	L	GF	GA	GD	Pts	Qualification
1	Latvia	3	3	0	0	14	7	+7	9	Main round
2	Cyprus (H)	3	2	0	1	9	7	+2	6	
3	Estonia	3	1	0	2	5	11	−6	3	
4	Armenia	3	0	0	3	6	9	−3	0	

Source: UEFA
Rules for classification: Qualification tiebreakers
(H) Hosts
22 October 2015
15:30

Latvia	6–2	Estonia
Šustrovs 6'; Seņs 19', 38'; Koļesņikovs 38'; Ikstēns 39'; Arhipovs-Prokofjevs 40'	Report	Tšurilkin 14'; Aleksejev 18'

Eleftheria Indoor Hall, Nicosia
Referee: Gabriel Gherman (Romania), Talgat Kosmukhambetov (Kazakhstan)
22 October 2015
18:00

Cyprus	3–2	Armenia
Ioannou 3', 7', 29'	Report	Gukasyan 17'; Babayan 17'

Eleftheria Indoor Hall, Nicosia
Referee: Juan Gallardo (Spain), Yusif Nurullayev (Azerbaijan)

23 October 2015
15:30

Armenia	3–4	Latvia
Nasibyan 5'; Kapukranyan 18'; Mashumyan 39'	Report	Aleksejevs 1'; Dacko 23'; Babayan 39' (o.g.); Koļesņikovs 40'

Eleftheria Indoor Hall, Nicosia
Referee: Yusif Nurullayev (Azerbaijan), Gabriel Gherman (Romania)
23 October 2015
18:00

Cyprus	4–1	Estonia
Veskimäe 7' (o.g.); Antreou 21', 24'; Kouloumbris 31'	Report	Paapsi 37'

Eleftheria Indoor Hall, Nicosia
Referee: Talgat Kosmukhambetov (Kazakhstan), Juan Gallardo (Spain)

25 October 2015
13:00

Estonia	2–1	Armenia
Paapsi 12'; Tšurilkin 25'	Report	Grigoryan 5'

Eleftheria Indoor Hall, Nicosia
Referee: Talgat Kosmukhambetov (Kazakhstan), Yusif Nurullayev (Azerbaijan)
25 October 2015
15:30

Latvia	4–2	Cyprus
Seņs 2', 35'; Avanesovs 6'; Dacko 30'	Report	Kouloumbris 12'; Manoli 27'

Eleftheria Indoor Hall, Nicosia
Referee: Gabriel Gherman (Romania), Juan Gallardo (Spain)

=== Group E ===
Pos	Team	Pld	W	D	L	GF	GA	GD	Pts	Qualification
1	England	3	3	0	0	12	7	+5	9	Main round
2	Denmark	3	2	0	1	15	10	+5	6	
3	Wales	3	1	0	2	9	12	−3	3	
4	Israel (H)	3	0	0	3	8	15	−7	0	

Source: UEFA
Rules for classification: Qualification tiebreakers
(H) Hosts
22 October 2015
15:00

England	4–2	Wales
Parkes 9'; Rexha 24'; Ward 27'; Cook 38'	Report	Hugh 4'; Zulkarnain 18'

Neve Marom Hall, Ramat Gan
Referee: Cédric Waroux (Belgium), Costas Nicolaou (Cyprus)
22 October 2015
17:30

Israel	4–6	Denmark
Sabag 13'; Hagbi 30'; Bliech 32'; Cohen 36'	Report	Jørgensen 4', 27'; Ja. Jensen 13', 25', 29'; Falck 35'

Neve Marom Hall, Ramat Gan
Referee: Vyacheslav Daragan (Ukraine), Marjan Mladenovski (Macedonia)

23 October 2015
13:00

Israel	3–6	Wales
Cohen 15', 37'; Bliech 39'	Report	Hugh 5'; Webbe 12', 35'; Zulkarnain 18', 23'; Prangley 39'

Neve Marom Hall, Ramat Gan
Referee: Costas Nicolaou (Cyprus), Cédric Waroux (Belgium)
23 October 2015
15:30

Denmark	4–5	England
Falck 16', 23', 24'; Rexha 34' (o.g.)	Report	Cook 1', 6'; Jim Jensen 11' (o.g.); Medina 23'; Ward 25'

Neve Marom Hall, Ramat Gan
Referee: Marjan Mladenovski (Macedonia), Vyacheslav Daragan (Ukraine)

25 October 2015
15:00

Wales	1–5	Denmark
Jenkins 35'	Report	Johansson 3', 27'; Arildsen 6'; Falck 18'; Veis 29'

Neve Marom Hall, Ramat Gan
Referee: Costas Nicolaou (Cyprus), Marjan Mladenovski (Macedonia)
25 October 2015
17:30

England	3–1	Israel
Cook 15'; Medina 21'; Ward 40'	Report	Bliech 36'

Neve Marom Hall, Ramat Gan
Referee: Vyacheslav Daragan (Ukraine), Cédric Waroux (Belgium)

=== Group F ===
Pos	Team	Pld	W	D	L	GF	GA	GD	Pts	Qualification
1	Finland (H)	2	1	1	0	3	0	+3	4	Main round
2	Bulgaria	2	0	2	0	2	2	0	2	
3	Switzerland	2	0	1	1	2	5	−3	1	

Source: UEFA
Rules for classification: Qualification tiebreakers
(H) Hosts
23 October 2015
17:30

Finland	3–0	Switzerland
Hosio 12', 20'; Pakola 34'	Report

Opinmäen koulu, Espoo
Referee: Lukáš Peško (Slovakia), Miguel Castilho (Portugal)

24 October 2015
13:00

Switzerland	2–2	Bulgaria
Mezger 2'; Sego 38'	Report	Shutev 22'; Nestorov 29'

Opinmäen koulu, Espoo
Referee: Grigori Zelentsov (Russia), Lukáš Peško (Slovakia)

25 October 2015
13:00

Bulgaria	0–0	Finland
	Report

Opinmäen koulu, Espoo
Referee: Miguel Castilho (Portugal), Grigori Zelentsov (Russia)

== Main round ==
All times were CET (UTC+1).

=== Group 1 ===
Pos	Team	Pld	W	D	L	GF	GA	GD	Pts	Qualification
1	Ukraine	3	3	0	0	18	5	+13	9	Play-offs
2	Hungary (H)	3	2	0	1	13	11	+2	6	Play-offs
3	Belgium	3	1	0	2	8	11	−3	3	
4	England	3	0	0	3	4	16	−12	0	

Source: UEFA
Rules for classification: Qualification tiebreakers
(H) Hosts
10 December 2015
16:00

Ukraine	7–0	England
Valenko 5', 12'; Myko. Grytsyna 15'; Razuvanov 16', 29'; Rogachov 29', 35'	Report

Magvassy Mihály Sportcsarnok, Győr
Referee: Dejan Nikolić (Slovenia), Fredric Nilholt (Sweden)
10 December 2015
18:15

Hungary	5–2	Belgium
Rábl 5', 33'; Dróth 9'; Németh 22'; Dávid 39'	Report	Rahou 1'; Dujacquier 37'

Magvassy Mihály Sportcsarnok, Győr
Referee: Sebastian Stawicki (Poland), Robert Pieter Lenting (Netherlands)

11 December 2015
17:45

Belgium	2–6	Ukraine
Lúcio 8'; Rahou 17'	Report	Razuvanov 6'; Koval 10', 18'; Valenko 16'; Mykh. Grytsyna 26'; Rogachov 29' (pen.)

Magvassy Mihály Sportcsarnok, Győr
Referee: Robert Pieter Lenting (Netherlands), Sebastian Stawicki (Poland)
11 December 2015
20:00

Hungary	5–4	England
Hosszú 16'; Németh 20'; Szeghy 21'; Rábl 25'; Klacsák 35'	Report	Cook 30'; Medina 31'; Parkes 34'; Gay 40'

Magvassy Mihály Sportcsarnok, Győr
Referee: Fredric Nilholt (Sweden), Dejan Nikolić (Slovenia)

13 December 2015
16:00

England	0–4	Belgium
	Report	Zaaf 27'; Yachou 28'; Medina 36' (o.g.); Adnane 40'

Magvassy Mihály Sportcsarnok, Győr
Referee: Robert Pieter Lenting (Netherlands), Fredric Nilholt (Sweden)
13 December 2015
18:15

Ukraine	5–3	Hungary
Mykh. Grytsyna 3'; Ovsyannikov 19', 35'; Zhurba 22'; Valenko 38' (pen.)	Report	Dróth 5' (pen.); Hosszú 30'; Horváth 37'

Magvassy Mihály Sportcsarnok, Győr
Referee: Sebastian Stawicki (Poland), Dejan Nikolić (Slovenia)

=== Group 2 ===
Pos	Team	Pld	W	D	L	GF	GA	GD	Pts	Qualification
1	Azerbaijan	3	2	1	0	19	8	+11	7	Play-offs
2	Belarus	3	1	1	1	11	13	−2	4 (Note: Ranked by head-to-head record (Belarus: 3 pts; Croatia: 0 pts).)	Play-offs
3	Croatia (H)	3	1	1	1	13	12	+1	4	
4	Sweden	3	0	1	2	5	15	−10	1	

Source: UEFA
Rules for classification: Qualification tiebreakers
(H) Hosts
Notes:
10 December 2015
17:00

Azerbaijan	8–2	Sweden
Borisov 3', 15'; Augusto 11'; Amadeu 11'; De Araujo 20'; Eduardo 25', 26', 36'	Report	Legiec 24'; Eteus 33'

Gradski vrt Hall, Osijek
Referee: Gábor Kovács (Hungary), Trayan Enchev (Bulgaria)
10 December 2015
19:30

Croatia	4–7	Belarus
Jelovčić 20' (pen.); Olshevski 22' (o.g.); Matošević 27'; Marinović 33'	Report	Olshevski 12'; Chernik 26'; Silivonchik 28', 31', 40'; Shostak 36', 39'

Gradski vrt Hall, Osijek
Referee: Gerd Bylois (Belgium), Vladimir Kadykov (Russia)

11 December 2015
17:30

Belarus	2–7	Azerbaijan
Chernik 15'; Popov 39'	Report	Augusto 4'; Eduardo 19', 19', 26'; Borisov 20'; De Araujo 25'; Chovdarov 37'

Gradski vrt Hall, Osijek
Referee: Trayan Enchev (Bulgaria), Gerd Bylois (Belgium)
11 December 2015
20:00

Croatia	5–1	Sweden
Matošević 2'; Suton 25', 33'; Marinović 30'; Grcić 36'	Report	S. Abraham 13'

Gradski vrt Hall, Osijek
Referee: Vladimir Kadykov (Russia), Gábor Kovács (Hungary)

13 December 2015
17:00

Sweden	2–2	Belarus
Mönell 22'; Burda 32'	Report	Chernik 18'; Silivonchik 26'

Gradski vrt Hall, Osijek
Referee: Gerd Bylois (Belgium), Trayan Enchev (Bulgaria)
13 December 2015
19:30

Azerbaijan	4–4	Croatia
Chuykov 5'; Amadeu 28'; Borisov 29', 37'	Report	Jelovčić 24'; Suton 29'; Grcić 37'; Grbeša 38'

Gradski vrt Hall, Osijek
Referee: Gábor Kovács (Hungary), Vladimir Kadykov (Russia)

=== Group 3 ===
Pos	Team	Pld	W	D	L	GF	GA	GD	Pts	Qualification
1	Russia	3	3	0	0	12	2	+10	9	Play-offs
2	Serbia	3	2	0	1	9	3	+6	6	Play-offs
3	Finland	3	1	0	2	9	7	+2	3	
4	Turkey (H)	3	0	0	3	3	21	−18	0	

Source: UEFA
Rules for classification: Qualification tiebreakers
(H) Hosts
10 December 2015
16:00

Russia	3–0	Finland
Kutuzov 17'; Milovanov 26'; Robinho 29'	Report

Halkapınar Sport Hall, İzmir
Referee: Nuno Bogalho (Portugal), Veljko Bošković (Montenegro)
10 December 2015
18:15

Turkey	0–6	Serbia
	Report	Rajčević 2', 38'; Rakić 21'; Kocić 22', 37'; Stojković 25'

Halkapınar Sport Hall, İzmir
Referee: Fernando Gutiérrez Lumbreras (Spain), Andrej Topić (Croatia)

11 December 2015
16:00

Serbia	1–2	Russia
Davydov 27' (o.g.)	Report	Eder Lima 22'; Lyskov 32'

Halkapınar Sport Hall, İzmir
Referee: Veljko Bošković (Montenegro), Fernando Gutiérrez Lumbreras (Spain)
11 December 2015
18:15

Turkey	2–8	Finland
Keskin 39'; Erdal 40' (pen.)	Report	Hosio 8'; Autio 15'; Jyrkiäinen 20', 26', 31'; Aytaş 21' (o.g.); Korsunov 24'; Teittinen 40'

Halkapınar Sport Hall, İzmir
Referee: Andrej Topić (Croatia), Nuno Bogalho (Portugal)

13 December 2015
16:00

Finland	1–2	Serbia
Autio 38'	Report	Perić 3'; Kocić 22'

Halkapınar Sport Hall, İzmir
Referee: Fernando Gutiérrez Lumbreras (Spain), Nuno Bogalho (Portugal)
13 December 2015
18:15

Russia	7–1	Turkey
Eder Lima 3'; Robinho 4', 30'; Romulo 15', 18'; Shakirov 26'; Pereverzev 36'	Report	Özcan 3'

Halkapınar Sport Hall, İzmir
Referee: Andrej Topić (Croatia), Veljko Bošković (Montenegro)

=== Group 4 ===
Pos	Team	Pld	W	D	L	GF	GA	GD	Pts	Qualification
1	Spain	3	3	0	0	22	2	+20	9	Play-offs
2	Netherlands (H)	3	2	0	1	8	12	−4	6	Play-offs
3	Bosnia and Herzegovina	3	1	0	2	9	14	−5	3	
4	Latvia	3	0	0	3	4	15	−11	0	

Source: UEFA
Rules for classification: Qualification tiebreakers
(H) Hosts
10 December 2015
17:30

Spain	7–0	Latvia
Raúl Campos 6'; Fernandão 23'; Aicardo 34'; Pola 34'; Alex 35'; Adolfo 37'; Rivillos 40'	Report

Indoor-Sportcentrum Eindhoven, Eindhoven
Referee: Cédric Pelissier (France), Damir Radović (Serbia)
10 December 2015
20:00

Netherlands	4–3	Bosnia and Herzegovina
Pavlović 7' (o.g.); El Morabiti 9'; Attaibi 14'; Ceyar 16'	Report	Bevanda 24' (pen.); El Ghannouti 29' (o.g.); Matan 30'

Indoor-Sportcentrum Eindhoven, Eindhoven
Referee: Saša Tomić (Croatia), Elchin Samadli (Azerbaijan)

11 December 2015
17:30

Bosnia and Herzegovina	1–8	Spain
Pavlović 2'	Report	Miguelín 9' (pen.), 20', 26', 28'; Rivillos 19'; Alex 28'; Lin 30'; Bebe 34'

Indoor-Sportcentrum Eindhoven, Eindhoven
Referee: Elchin Samadli (Azerbaijan), Cédric Pelissier (France)
11 December 2015
20:00

Netherlands	3–2	Latvia
Ceyar 23'; St Juste 24'; De Groot 39'	Report	Aleksejevs 6'; Ikstēns 40'

Indoor-Sportcentrum Eindhoven, Eindhoven
Referee: Damir Radović (Serbia), Saša Tomić (Croatia)

13 December 2015
15:30

Latvia	2–5	Bosnia and Herzegovina
Seņs 13'; Ikstēns 33'	Report	Mulahmetović 23'; Radmilović 32'; Šunjić 38'; Bevanda 40', 40'

Indoor-Sportcentrum Eindhoven, Eindhoven
Referee: Damir Radović (Serbia), Saša Tomić (Croatia)
13 December 2015
18:00

Spain	7–1	Netherlands
Aicardo 18', 18'; Alex 23', 32'; Bebe 33'; Pola 36'; Adolfo 38'	Report	El Morabiti 11'

Indoor-Sportcentrum Eindhoven, Eindhoven
Referee: Cédric Pelissier (France), Elchin Samadli (Azerbaijan)

=== Group 5 ===
Pos	Team	Pld	W	D	L	GF	GA	GD	Pts	Qualification
1	Kazakhstan	3	2	1	0	9	5	+4	7	Play-offs
2	Slovenia	3	1	2	0	7	6	+1	5	Play-offs
3	Czech Republic (H)	3	1	0	2	6	8	−2	3	
4	France	3	0	1	2	6	9	−3	1	

Source: UEFA
Rules for classification: Qualification tiebreakers
(H) Hosts
10 December 2015
16:30

Czech Republic	1–3	Kazakhstan
Cupák 8'	Report	Leo 13'; Yesenamanov 14'; Suleimenov 35'

Městská sportovní hala Chomutov, Chomutov
Referee: Oleg Ivanov (Ukraine), Alejandro Martinez Flores (Spain)
10 December 2015
19:00

Slovenia	2–2	France
Vrhovec 6'; Osredkar 20'	Report	Hamdoud 7'; Alla 16'

Městská sportovní hala Chomutov, Chomutov
Referee: Franco Cachia (Malta), Josip Barton (Macedonia)

11 December 2015
16:30

Kazakhstan	2–2	Slovenia
Yesenamanov 10'; Nurgozhin 19'	Report	R. Mordej 11'; Čujec 29'

Městská sportovní hala Chomutov, Chomutov
Referee: Alejandro Martinez Flores (Spain), Franco Cachia (Malta)
11 December 2015
19:00

Czech Republic	3–2	France
Záruba 28'; Seidler 28'; M. Mareš 34'	Report	Aigoun 22'; Belhaj 31'

Městská sportovní hala Chomutov, Chomutov
Referee: Josip Barton (Macedonia), Oleg Ivanov (Ukraine)

13 December 2015
13:30

France	2–4	Kazakhstan
Leo 15' (o.g.); Hamdoud 34' (pen.)	Report	Nurgozhin 1', 40'; Zhamankulov 16'; Douglas Jr. 25'

Městská sportovní hala Chomutov, Chomutov
Referee: Josip Barton (Macedonia), Franco Cachia (Malta)
13 December 2015
16:00

Slovenia	3–2	Czech Republic
R. Mordej 9'; Osredkar 14', 26'	Report	M. Mareš 19', 22'

Městská sportovní hala Chomutov, Chomutov
Referee: Oleg Ivanov (Ukraine), Alejandro Martinez Flores (Spain)

=== Group 6 ===
Pos	Team	Pld	W	D	L	GF	GA	GD	Pts	Qualification
1	Portugal (H)	3	3	0	0	17	3	+14	9	Play-offs
2	Poland	3	2	0	1	13	9	+4	6	Play-offs
3	Romania	3	1	0	2	6	14	−8	3	
4	Norway	3	0	0	3	4	14	−10	0	

Source: UEFA
Rules for classification: Qualification tiebreakers
(H) Hosts
10 December 2015
19:00

Portugal	6–2	Poland
Fábio Cecílio 3'; Tiago Brito 9'; Cardinal 10', 19'; Djô 28'; Ricardinho 34'	Report	Kriezel 14'; Zastawnik 28'

Pavilhão Desportivo Municipal da Póvoa de Varzim, Póvoa de Varzim
Referee: Ondřej Černý (Czech Republic), Nicola Manzione (Italy)
10 December 2015
21:30

Romania	5–1	Norway
Achrifi 2' (o.g.); M. Matei 7'; Stoica 34'; Răducu 40'; Iancu 40'	Report	Skaga 28'

Pavilhão Desportivo Municipal da Póvoa de Varzim, Póvoa de Varzim
Referee: Kamil Çetin (Turkey), Moshe Bohbot (Israel)

11 December 2015
19:30

Portugal	6–1	Norway
Fábio Cecílio 6', 20'; Fábio Lima 14'; Cardinal 29', 33'; Djô 39'	Report	Fonstad 25' (pen.)

Pavilhão Desportivo Municipal da Póvoa de Varzim, Póvoa de Varzim
Referee: Moshe Bohbot (Israel), Ondřej Černý (Czech Republic)
11 December 2015
22:00

Poland	8–1	Romania
Mikołajewicz 6'; Kubik 17'; Krawczyk 33'; Nawrat 35', 40', 40'; Kriezel 36'; Franz 39'	Report	M. Matei 36'

Pavilhão Desportivo Municipal da Póvoa de Varzim, Póvoa de Varzim
Referee: Nicola Manzione (Italy), Kamil Çetin (Turkey)

13 December 2015
15:00

Norway	2–3	Poland
Abelsen 28'; Obeng 30'	Report	Kriezel 29', 31'; Fonstad 32' (o.g.)

Pavilhão Desportivo Municipal da Póvoa de Varzim, Póvoa de Varzim
Referee: Nicola Manzione (Italy), Moshe Bohbot (Israel)
13 December 2015
17:30

Romania	0–5	Portugal
	Report	Cardinal 1', 13'; Ricardinho 3', 40'; Fábio Cecílio 27'

Pavilhão Desportivo Municipal da Póvoa de Varzim, Póvoa de Varzim
Referee: Ondřej Černý (Czech Republic), Kamil Çetin (Turkey)

=== Group 7 ===
Pos	Team	Pld	W	D	L	GF	GA	GD	Pts	Qualification
1	Italy (H)	3	2	0	1	10	4	+6	6 (Note: Ranked by head-to-head record (Italy: 3 pts, +4 GD; Slovakia: 3 pts, 0 GD; Macedonia: 3 pts, −4 GD).)	Play-offs
2	Slovakia	3	2	0	1	6	4	+2	6	Play-offs
3	North Macedonia	3	2	0	1	8	9	−1	6	
4	Moldova	3	0	0	3	4	11	−7	0	

Source: UEFA
Rules for classification: Qualification tiebreakers
(H) Hosts
Notes:
10 December 2015
10:00

Slovakia	3–1	Moldova
Papajčík 15'; Drahovský 23', 38'	Report	Laşcu 32' (pen.)

PalaFlorio, Bari
Referee: Gabriel Gherman (Romania), Aleksandras Sliva (Lithuania)
10 December 2015
12:00

Italy	6–1	North Macedonia
Romano 9'; Japa 21'; Merlim 23'; Canal 28'; Gabriel Lima 33'; Patias 35'	Report	Micevski 24'

PalaFlorio, Bari
Referee: Ivan Shabanov (Russia), Vasilios Christodoulis (Greece)

11 December 2015
18:00

North Macedonia	2–1	Slovakia
Micevski 32'; Leovski 33'	Report	Rafaj 23'

PalaFlorio, Bari
Referee: Aleksandras Sliva (Lithuania), Ivan Shabanov (Russia)
11 December 2015
20:30

Italy	3–1	Moldova
Merlim 2'; Patias 3'; Canal 7'	Report	Munteanu 40'

PalaFlorio, Bari
Referee: Vasilios Christodoulis (Greece), Gabriel Gherman (Romania)

13 December 2015
15:30

Moldova	2–5	North Macedonia
Negara 25'; Laşcu 40'	Report	Petrović 12'; Leovski 15'; Gligorov 21'; Micevski 38' (pen.); Marinho de Souza 40'

PalaFlorio, Bari
Referee: Ivan Shabanov (Russia), Gabriel Gherman (Romania)
13 December 2015
18:00

Slovakia	2–1	Italy
Belaník 29', 31'	Report	Patias 3'

PalaFlorio, Bari
Referee: Aleksandras Sliva (Lithuania), Vasilios Christodoulis (Greece)

== Play-offs ==
The draw for the play-offs was held on 12 February 2016, 12:00 CET (UTC+1), at the Crowne Plaza Hotel in Belgrade, Serbia. The seven group winners were seeded, and the seven group runners-up were unseeded. The seeded teams were paired with the unseeded teams, with the former hosting the second leg. Teams from the same main round group could not be drawn against each other.

=== Seeding ===
Group	Winners (Seeded in play-off draw)	Runners-up (Unseeded in play-off draw)
1	Ukraine	Hungary
2	Azerbaijan	Belarus
3	Russia	Serbia
4	Spain	Netherlands
5	Kazakhstan	Slovenia
6	Portugal	Poland
7	Italy	Slovakia

=== Summary ===
Team 1	Agg.	Team 2	1st leg	2nd leg
Slovenia	2–5	Spain	1–0	1–5
Slovakia	1–11	Ukraine	0–6	1–5
Poland	1–8	Kazakhstan	1–1	0–7
Serbia	2–4	Portugal	1–2	1–2
Belarus	3–6	Russia	1–4	2–2
Netherlands	5–9	Azerbaijan	1–5	4–4
Hungary	0–9	Italy	0–3	0–6

=== Matches ===
The first legs were played on 22 March, and the second legs were played on 12 and 13 April 2016. Times were CET (UTC+1) for first legs, and CEST (UTC+2) for second legs.

22 March 2016
20:00

Slovenia	1–0	Spain
Fetić 19'	Report

Tabor Hall, Maribor
Referee: Alessandro Malfer (Italy), Angelo Galante (Italy)
12 April 2016
20:00

Spain	5–1	Slovenia
Raúl Campos 3', 35'; Ortiz 24'; Miguelín 40'; Aicardo 40' (pen.)	Report	Širok 6'

Pabellón Javier Imbroda Ortiz, Melilla
Referee: Pascal Lemal (Belgium), Gerd Bylois (Belgium)

Spain won 5–2 on aggregate and qualified for the final tournament.

22 March 2016
19:00

Slovakia	0–6	Ukraine
	Report	Mykh. Grytsyna 15', 23', 33'; Kiselyov 17'; Borsuk 28'; Zhurba 29'

Sportova hala Klokocina, Nitra
Referee: Timo Onatsu (Finland), Borislav Kolev (Bulgaria)
12 April 2016
18:00

Ukraine	5–1	Slovakia
Borsuk 7'; Zhurba 15', 18' (pen.); Shoturma 26', 33'	Report	Doša 28'

Odesa Sports Palace, Odesa
Referee: Fernando Gutiérrez Lumbreras (Spain), Juan Gallardo (Spain)

Ukraine won 11–1 on aggregate and qualified for the final tournament.

22 March 2016
18:00

Poland	1–1	Kazakhstan
Mikołajewicz 40'	Report	Zhamankulov 4'

Arena Szczecin, Szczecin
Referee: Kamil Çetin (Turkey), Ozan Soykan (Turkey)
12 April 2016
16:00

Kazakhstan	7–0	Poland
Higuita 2'; Zhamankulov 5', 13'; Douglas Jr. 6', 15'; Leo 26'; Knaub 30'	Report

Baluan Sholak Sports Palace, Almaty
Referee: Bogdan Sorescu (Romania), Gabriel Gherman (Romania)

Kazakhstan won 8–1 on aggregate and qualified for the final tournament.

22 March 2016
20:15

Serbia	1–2	Portugal
Perić 26'	Report	Matos 12'; Cardinal 15'

Kombank Arena, Belgrade
Referee: Saša Tomić (Croatia), Nikola Jelić (Croatia)
12 April 2016
20:30

Portugal	2–1	Serbia
Cardinal 24'; Tiago Brito 31'	Report	Ristić 26'

Pavilhão Multiusos Odivelas, Odivelas
Attendance: 2254
Referee: Gábor Kovács (Hungary), Balázs Farkas (Hungary)

Portugal won 4–2 on aggregate and qualified for the final tournament.

22 March 2016
16:30

Belarus	1–4	Russia
Chernik 11'	Report	Robinho 4'; Abramov 9', 34'; Lyskov 13'

Minsk Sports Palace, Minsk
Referee: Tomasz Frak (Poland), Sebastian Stawicki (Poland)
12 April 2016
16:00

Russia	2–2	Belarus
Antoshkin 14'; Eder Lima 39'	Report	Olshevski 19'; Gorbenko 32'

Sports Palace Tyumen, Tyumen
Referee: Eduardo Fernandes Coelho (Portugal), Nuno Bogalho (Portugal)

Russia won 6–3 on aggregate and qualified for the final tournament.

22 March 2016
20:00

Netherlands	1–5	Azerbaijan
El Ghannouti 10'	Report	Amadeu 5', 29'; Fineo 13'; Augusto 28'; Borisov 31'

Topsportcentrum, Almere
Referee: Ondřej Černý (Czech Republic), Cédric Pelissier (France)
12 April 2016
18:00

Azerbaijan	4–4	Netherlands
Farzaliyev 12'; Amadeu 15'; Eduardo 20'; Rafael 26'	Report	Ceyar 14'; Velseboer 16'; Mossaoui 26'; Attaibi 28'

Baku Sports Hall, Baku
Referee: Gerald Bauernfeind (Austria), Oleg Ivanov (Ukraine)

Azerbaijan won 9–5 on aggregate and qualified for the final tournament.

22 March 2016
18:00

Hungary	0–3	Italy
	Report	Merlim 23', 34'; Fortino 24'

Generali Arena, Miskolc
Referee: Admir Zahovič (Slovenia), Dejan Nikolić (Slovenia)
13 April 2016
20:30

Italy	6–0	Hungary
Romano 3', 22'; Merlim 4'; Vinícius dos Santos 11'; Fortino 15'; Kaká 27'	Report

Palaprato, Prato
Referee: Marc Birkett (England), Ivan Shabanov (Russia)

Italy won 9–0 on aggregate and qualified for the final tournament.

== Qualified teams ==
The following seven teams from UEFA qualified for the final tournament:

Team	Qualified on	Previous appearances in tournament^{1}
Spain	12 April 2016	7 (1989, 1992, 1996, **2000**, **2004**, 2008, 2012)
Ukraine	12 April 2016	4 (1996, 2004, 2008, 2012)
Kazakhstan	12 April 2016	1 (2000^{2})
Portugal	12 April 2016	4 (2000, 2004, 2008, 2012)
Russia	12 April 2016	5 (1992, 1996, 2000, 2008, 2012)
Azerbaijan	12 April 2016	0 (debut)
Italy	13 April 2016	6 (1989, 1992, 1996, 2004, 2008, 2012)

^{1} Bold indicates champion for that year. Italic indicates host for that year.
^{2} Kazakhstan qualified as a member of the AFC in 2000.

== Goalscorers ==
8 goals

- (Portugal) Fernando Cardinal

7 goals

- (Azerbaijan) Eduardo

6 goals

- (Azerbaijan) Vitaliy Borisov
- (Moldova) Cristian Obadă
- (Sweden) Dan Mönell

5 goals

- (Azerbaijan) Amadeu
- (Denmark) Mads Falck
- (England) Stuart Cook
- (Georgia (country)) Giorgi Tikurishvili
- (Italy) Alex Merlim
- (Latvia) Maksims Seņs
- (Moldova) Oleg Hilotii
- (Montenegro) Milovan Drašković
- (Spain) Miguelín
- (Ukraine) Mykhailo Grytsyna

4 goals

- (Belarus) Aleksandr Chernik
- (Belarus) Sergei Silivonchik
- (France) Kamel Hamdoud
- (France) Abdessamad Mohammed
- (Kazakhstan) Serik Zhamankulov
- (Moldova) Andrian Laşcu
- (Moldova) Andrei Negara
- (Poland) Tomasz Kriezel
- (Portugal) Fábio Cecílio
- (Russia) Robinho
- (Spain) Jesús Aicardo
- (Spain) Álex Yepes
- (Ukraine) Yevgen Valenko
- (Ukraine) Serhiy Zhurba

3 goals

- (Albania) Azem Brahimi
- (Albania) Roald Halimi
- (Andorra) Carlos Barbosa
- (Azerbaijan) Augusto
- (Azerbaijan) Fineo De Araujo
- (Bosnia and Herzegovina) Tomo Bevanda
- (Croatia) Josip Suton
- (Cyprus) Markos Ioannou
- (Czech Republic) Michal Mareš
- (Denmark) Jacob Jensen
- (England) Raoni Medina
- (England) Richard Ward
- (Finland) Miika Hosio
- (Finland) Juhana Jyrkiäinen
- (France) Azdine Aigoun
- (France) Adrien Gasmi
- (Georgia (country)) Irakli Todua
- (Hungary) János Rábl
- (Kazakhstan) Douglas Júnior
- (Kazakhstan) Dauren Nurgozhin
- (Israel) Yotam Bliech
- (Israel) Adam Cohen
- (Italy) Alessandro Patias
- (Italy) Sergio Romano
- (Latvia) Oskars Ikstēns
- (North Macedonia) Adrijan Micevski
- (Moldova) Alexei Munteanu
- (Netherlands) Tevfik Ceyar
- (Poland) Bartłomiej Nawrat
- (Portugal) Ricardinho
- (Russia) Eder Lima
- (Spain) Raúl Campos
- (Serbia) Mladen Kocić
- (Slovenia) Igor Osredkar
- (Sweden) Sargon Abraham
- (Sweden) Kristian Legiec
- (Ukraine) Volodymyr Razuvanov
- (Ukraine) Yevgen Rogachov
- (Wales) Rico Zulkarnain

2 goals

- (Albania) Gentian Begaj
- (Andorra) Nacho Llamas
- (Belarus) Aleksandr Olshevski
- (Belarus) Sergei Shostak
- (Belgium) Omar Rahou
- (Croatia) Jakov Grcić
- (Croatia) Franko Jelovčić
- (Croatia) Dario Marinović
- (Croatia) Vedran Matošević
- (Cyprus) Kostas Antreou
- (Cyprus) Costas Kouloumbris
- (Denmark) Rasmus Johansson
- (Denmark) Kevin Jørgensen
- (England) Ian Parkes
- (Estonia) Kristjan Paapsi
- (Estonia) Vladislav Tšurilkin
- (Finland) Panu Autio
- (France) Sid Belhaj
- (Georgia (country)) Vakhtangi Jvarashvili
- (Georgia (country)) Murtaz Kakabadze
- (Georgia (country)) Zurab Lukava
- (Georgia (country)) Gia Nikvashvili
- (Gibraltar) Andrew Lopez
- (Greece) Apostolos Gkaifyllias
- (Hungary) Zoltán Dróth
- (Hungary) Ádám Hosszú
- (Hungary) Péter Németh
- (Italy) Mauro Canal
- (Italy) Rodolfo Fortino
- (Kazakhstan) Leo Jaraguá
- (Kazakhstan) Chingiz Yesenamanov
- (Latvia) Andrejs Aleksejevs
- (Latvia) Igors Dacko
- (Latvia) Artjoms Koļesņikovs
- (North Macedonia) Igor Leovski
- (Malta) Jovica Milijic
- (Netherlands) Mohamed Attaibi
- (Netherlands) Zaid El Morabiti
- (Poland) Marcin Mikołajewicz
- (Portugal) Tiago Brito
- (Portugal) Djô
- (Romania) Marius Matei
- (Russia) Sergei Abramov
- (Russia) Dmitri Lyskov
- (Russia) Rômulo
- (San Marino) Matteo Michelotti
- (Serbia) Marko Perić
- (Serbia) Slobodan Rajčević
- (Slovakia) Marek Belaník
- (Slovakia) Tomáš Drahovský
- (Slovenia) Rok Mordej
- (Spain) Adolfo
- (Spain) Bebe
- (Spain) Pola
- (Spain) Mario Rivillos
- (Sweden) Hanna Abraham
- (Sweden) Mathias Eteus
- (Ukraine) Ihor Borsuk
- (Ukraine) Sergiy Koval
- (Ukraine) Denys Ovsyannikov
- (Ukraine) Petro Shoturma
- (Wales) Chris Hugh
- (Wales) Tyrell Webbe

1 goal

- (Albania) Almir Hasaj
- (Albania) Rej Karaja
- (Albania) Mentor Mejzini
- (Armenia) Armen Babayan
- (Armenia) Henrik Grigoryan
- (Armenia) Vardan Gukasyan
- (Armenia) Grigor Kapukranyan
- (Armenia) Garegin Mashumyan
- (Armenia) Sargis Nasibyan
- (Azerbaijan) Ramiz Chovdarov
- (Azerbaijan) Sergey Chuykov
- (Azerbaijan) Rizvan Farzaliyev
- (Azerbaijan) Rafael
- (Belarus) Oleg Gorbenko
- (Belarus) Aleksei Popov
- (Belgium) Ibrahim Adnane
- (Belgium) Valentin Dujacquier
- (Belgium) Lúcio
- (Belgium) Jawad Yachou
- (Belgium) Hamza Zaaf
- (Bosnia and Herzegovina) Ivan Matan
- (Bosnia and Herzegovina) Nijaz Mulahmetović
- (Bosnia and Herzegovina) Dejan Pavlović
- (Bosnia and Herzegovina) Anel Radmilović
- (Bosnia and Herzegovina) Marin Šunjić
- (Bulgaria) Daniel Nestorov
- (Bulgaria) Yosif Shutev
- (Croatia) Kristijan Grbeša
- (Cyprus) Manolis Manoli
- (Czech Republic) David Cupák
- (Czech Republic) Michal Seidler
- (Czech Republic) Radim Záruba
- (Denmark) Rasmus Lørup Arildsen
- (Denmark) Louis Veis
- (England) William Gay
- (England) Agon Rexha
- (Estonia) Maksim Aleksejev
- (Finland) Sergei Korsunov
- (Finland) Joni Pakola
- (Finland) Antti Teittinen
- (France) Samir Alla
- (France) Boumedyen Bensaber
- (France) Réda Rabei
- (France) Kevin Ramirez
- (Georgia (country)) Tornike Bukia
- (Georgia (country)) Levan Kobaidze
- (Georgia (country)) Kakhaber Maisaia
- (Georgia (country)) Lasha Sigunava
- (Gibraltar) Joseph Chipol
- (Gibraltar) Ivan Robba
- (Gibraltar) Jamie Walker
- (Greece) Vasilis Asimakopoulos
- (Greece) Petros Katevtsian
- (Greece) Spyridon Kondylatos
- (Greece) Kostas Malovits
- (Greece) Andreas Mantis
- (Greece) Kostas Panou
- (Hungary) Richárd Dávid
- (Hungary) Norbert Horváth
- (Hungary) Bence Klacsák
- (Hungary) Szabolcs Szeghy
- (Israel) Yoav Hagbi
- (Israel) Asif-Yosef Sabag
- (Italy) Gabriel Lima
- (Italy) Japa
- (Italy) Kaká
- (Italy) Vinícius dos Santos
- (Kazakhstan) Leo Higuita
- (Kazakhstan) Arnold Knaub
- (Kazakhstan) Dinmukhambet Suleimenov
- (Latvia) Jurijs Arhipovs-Prokofjevs
- (Latvia) Igors Avanesovs
- (Latvia) Andrejs Šustrovs
- (Lithuania) Vaidas Garšvinskas
- (Lithuania) Jurij Jeremejev
- (Lithuania) Rolandas Leščius
- (Lithuania) Deividas Stradalovas
- (North Macedonia) Aleksandar Gligorov
- (North Macedonia) Daniel Marinho de Souza
- (North Macedonia) Dragan Petrović
- (Malta) Andy Mangion
- (Malta) Dylan Musu
- (Malta) Xavier Saliba
- (Malta) Luke Stivala
- (Moldova) Constantin Burdujel
- (Moldova) Sergiu Tacot
- (Moldova) Alexandr Ţîmbalist
- (Montenegro) Bojan Bajović
- (Montenegro) Saša Gojković
- (Montenegro) Semir Gurzaković
- (Montenegro) Ilija Mugoša
- (Netherlands) Jeroen de Groot
- (Netherlands) Jamal El Ghannouti
- (Netherlands) Karim Mossaoui
- (Netherlands) Yoshua St Juste
- (Netherlands) Mats Velseboer
- (Norway) Mathias Dahl Abelsen
- (Norway) Omar Fonstad
- (Norway) Dennis Obeng
- (Norway) Erlend Skaga
- (Poland) Rafał Franz
- (Poland) Daniel Krawczyk
- (Poland) Michał Kubik
- (Poland) Mikołaj Zastawnik
- (Portugal) Fábio Lima
- (Portugal) João Matos
- (Romania) Vlad Iancu
- (Romania) Emil Răducu
- (Romania) Dumitru Stoica
- (Russia) Artem Antoshkin
- (Russia) Danil Kutuzov
- (Russia) Ivan Milovanov
- (Russia) Nikolai Pereverzev
- (Russia) Renat Shakirov
- (San Marino) Raffaele Barducci
- (San Marino) Michele Moretti
- (San Marino) Elia Pasqualini
- (Serbia) Stefan Rakić
- (Serbia) Darko Ristić
- (Serbia) Miloš Stojković
- (Slovakia) Martin Doša
- (Slovakia) Vladimír Papajčík
- (Slovakia) Dušan Rafaj
- (Slovenia) Kristjan Čujec
- (Slovenia) Alen Fetić
- (Slovenia) Anže Širok
- (Slovenia) Gašper Vrhovec
- (Spain) Fernandão
- (Spain) Lin
- (Spain) Carlos Ortiz
- (Sweden) Niklas Asp
- (Sweden) Patrik Burda
- (Sweden) Simon Chekroun
- (Sweden) Albert Hiseni
- (Sweden) Dana Kuhi
- (Switzerland) Yves Mezger
- (Switzerland) Mato Sego
- (Turkey) Yasin Erdal
- (Turkey) Cem Keskin
- (Turkey) Cihan Özcan
- (Ukraine) Mykola Grytsyna
- (Ukraine) Vitaliy Kiselyov
- (Wales) Lloyd Jenkins
- (Wales) Simon Prangley

1 own goal

- (Armenia) Armen Babayan (against Latvia)
- (Belarus) Aleksandr Olshevski (against Croatia)
- (Bosnia and Herzegovina) Dejan Pavlović (against Netherlands)
- (Denmark) Jim Jensen (against England)
- (England) Raoni Medina (against Belgium)
- (England) Agon Rexha (against Denmark)
- (Estonia) Robert Veskimäe (against Cyprus)
- (Kazakhstan) Leo Jaraguá (against France)
- (Netherlands) Jamal El Ghannouti (against Bosnia and Herzegovina)
- (Norway) Mustapha Achrifi (against Romania)
- (Norway) Omar Fonstad (against Poland)
- (Russia) Daniil Davydov (against Serbia)
- (Turkey) Alper Tolgahan Aytaş (against Finland)

Source: UEFA.com
