= Scotland national futsal team =

Scotland
- Association: Scottish Football Association
- Confederation: UEFA (Europe)
- Head coach: Gordon McGillivray
- Captain: Kyle Ballingall
- Most caps: Ben O'Hanlon (43)
- Top scorer: Connor McLaren (10)
- Home stadium: NPC Edinburgh
- FIFA code: SCO
- FIFA ranking: 131 (24 September 2026)
Home colours	Away colours

First international
- England 5–1 Scotland (Rome, Italy; 16 July 1983)

Biggest win
- Northern Ireland 2-8 Scotland (Cardiff Wales; 4 December 2016)

Biggest defeat
- Sweden 13–0 Scotland (Skövde, Sweden; 15 January 2015)

FIFA World Cup
- Appearances: 0

European Championship
- Appearances: 0

The Scotland national futsal team represents Scotland in international futsal competitions such as the FIFA Futsal World Cup and the European Championships and is controlled by the Scottish Football Association.

The team played its first home match in April 2016, against Gibraltar.

== Competitive record ==
=== FIFA Futsal World Cup ===
FIFA Futsal World Cup record										Qualification record						
Year	Round	Position	Pld	W	D	L	GF	GA	Squad	Outcome	Pld	W	D	L	GF	GA
(Netherlands) 1989	Did not enter									Did not enter						
(Hong Kong) 1992	Did not enter									Did not enter						
(Spain) 1996	Did not enter									Did not enter						
(Guatemala) 2000	Did not enter									Did not enter						
(Taiwan) 2004	Did not enter									Did not enter						
(Brazil) 2008	Did not enter									Did not enter						
(Thailand) 2012	Did not enter									Did not enter						
(Colombia) 2016	Did not enter									Did not enter						
(Lithuania) 2021	Did not qualify									Group F 4th place	3	0	0	3	5	18
(Uzbekistan) 2024	Did not qualify									Group C 4th place	3	0	0	3	3	24
2028	Did not qualify									Group A 4th place	3	0	0	3	4	17
Total	—	0/11	0	0	0	0	0	0	—	3/10	9	0	0	9	12	59

=== UEFA Futsal Championship ===
UEFA Futsal Euro record								Qualification record						
Year	Round	Pld	W	D	L	GF	GA	Outcome	Pld	W	D	L	GF	GA
(Spain) 1996	Did not enter							Did not enter						
(Spain) 1999	Did not enter							Did not enter						
(Russia) 2001	Did not enter							Did not enter						
(Italy) 2003	Did not enter							Did not enter						
(Czech Republic) 2005	Did not enter							Did not enter						
(Portugal) 2007	Did not enter							Did not enter						
(Hungary) 2010	Did not enter							Did not enter						
(Croatia) 2012	Did not enter							Did not enter						
(Belgium) 2014	Did not enter							Did not enter						
(Serbia) 2016	Did not qualify							Group F 4th place	3	0	0	3	2	25
(Slovenia) 2018	Did not qualify							Group A 4th place	3	0	0	3	4	23
(Netherlands) 2022	Did not qualify							Group B 4th place	3	0	1	2	7	18
(Latvia) (Lithuania) (Slovenia) 2026	Did not qualify							Group C 4th place	3	0	0	3	3	11
Total	0/13	0	0	0	0	0	0	4/13	12	0	1	11	16	77

=== Home Nations Futsal Championship ===
Home Nations Futsal Championship Record
Year	Round	Position	Pld	W	D	L	GS	GA
(Wales) 2016	Group stage	3rd	3	1	0	2	10	16
(Scotland) 2017	Group stage	3rd	3	1	1	1	7	9
(Northern Ireland) 2018	Group stage	3rd	3	1	0	2	9	11
(England) 2019	Group stage	4th	3	0	1	2	7	13
Total			12	3	2	7	33	49

== Players ==
=== Current squad ===
The following players were called up to the squad for the 2028 FIFA Futsal World Cup qualifying matches against Andorra, Denmark and Malta on 8, 9 and 11 April 2026 respectively.

No.	Pos.	Player	Date of birth (age)	Caps	Goals	Club
1	GK	Benjamin O'Hanlon (captain)	30 April 1993 (age 33)			(The Football Association) Wessex Futsal Club
12	GK	Robert Black	2 January 2001 (age 25)			(Scottish Football Association) PYF Saltires
2	DF	Callum Husband	27 January 2006 (age 20)			(Scottish Football Association) Futsal Escocia
4	DF	James Grant	25 December 1996 (age 29)			(The Football Association) Bloomsbury Futsal Club
15	DF	Ross Chisholm	14 January 1988 (age 38)			(Scottish Football Association) PYF Saltires
3	FW	Scott Smith	21 July 1995 (age 31)			(Scottish Football Association) PYF Saltires
5	FW	John Howard	18 June 1993 (age 33)			(Football Association of Wales) Futsal Club Cardiff
6	FW	Ellis Stevenson	3 March 2008 (age 18)			(Scottish Football Association) Joga Futsal Academy
7	FW	Daniel Angus	23 November 2003 (age 22)			(Royal Spanish Football Federation) ElPozo Murcia B
8	FW	Kai Lawless	12 January 2002 (age 24)			(The Football Association) Bolton Futsal Club
9	FW	Christopher Angus	28 September 1990 (age 36)			(Scottish Football Association) Aberdeen Futsal Academy
10	FW	Ahmed Aloulou	15 July 1996 (age 30)			(The Football Association) Manchester Futsal Club
11	FW	Gavin Ritchie	23 October 1999 (age 26)			(Scottish Football Association) PYF Saltires
14	FW	Noah Lucas	10 February 2006 (age 20)			(The Football Association) Sala Futsal Club

=== Recent call-ups ===
The following players have also been called up to the squad within the last 12 months.

Pos.	Player	Date of birth (age)	Caps	Goals	Club	Latest call-up
DF	Jamie Bell	25 March 2003 (age 23)			(Scotland) PYF Saltires	v. Malta, 25 January 2026
DF	Ross Cameron	26 March 2003 (age 23)			(Scotland) PYF Saltires	v. Malta, 25 January 2026
FW	Caleb Holness	2 August 2007 (age 19)			(Scotland) Futsal Escocia	v. Malta, 25 January 2026
FW	Adam Fairweather	17 August 2001 (age 25)			(Scotland) Futsal Club 33	v. Malta, 25 January 2026
^{INJ} Player withdrew from the squad due to an injury.^{PRE} Preliminary squad.^{RET} Retired from international futsal.

== Scotland matches ==
Opponent	H / A	Date	Competition	Score	Scorers	Venue
Israel	Away	14-01-2015	Euro 2016 Prelim Rd	1–6	Scott Lafferty	Skvode, Sweden
Sweden	Away	15-01-2015	Euro 2016 Prelim Rd	0–13	----	Skvode, Sweden
Armenia	Away	17-01-2015	Euro 2016 Prelim Rd	1–6	Garry Hay	Skvode, Sweden
Gibraltar	Home	27-04-2016	Friendly	4–3	Sean Mushin ×2, Craig McLeish, Scott Mollison	Bells Sports Centre, Perth, Scotland
Gibraltar	Home	28-04-2016	Friendly	4–2	Jack Guthrie ×2, Rhys Davis, Mark Caldow	Bells Sports Centre, Perth, Scotland
England	Away	2-12-2016	Home Nations	0–9	----	House of Sport, Cardiff, Wales
Wales	Away	3-12-2016	Home Nations	2–5	Craig McLeish, Dayle Robertson	House of Sport, Cardiff, Wales
Northern Ireland	Away	4-12-2016	Home Nations	8–2	Craig McLeish ×3, Fraser Smith ×2, Jack Guthrie, Dayle Robertson, Jamie Forsyth	House of Sport, Cardiff, Wales
Switzerland	Away	24-01-2017	Euro Futsal 2018 Prem Rd	2–6	Sean Muhsin, Rhys Davis	Tbilisi, Georgia
Georgia	Away	25-01-2017	Euro Futsal 2018 Prem Rd	0–11	----	Tbilisi, Georgia
Israel	Away	27-01-2017	Euro Futsal 2018 Prem Rd	2–6	Sean Muhsin, James Yates	Tbilisi, Georgia
Northern Ireland	Home	1-12-2017	Home Nations	4–1	Ahmed Aloulou, Lee Cameron, Scott Smith, Kevin Hagan	Edinburgh, Scotland
Wales	Home	2-12-2017	Home Nations	3–3	Scott Mollison ×2, Kevin Hagan	Edinburgh, Scotland
England	Home	3-12-2017	Home Nations	0–5	----	Edinburgh, Scotland
Northern Ireland	Away	22-06-2018	Friendly	6–8	Scott Mollison ×3, Ahmed Aloulou, Kyle Ballingall ×2, Joe Andrew, Neil Laurenson	Newry L.C, Northern Ireland
Northern Ireland	Away	23-06-2018	Friendly	6–6	Joe Andrew ×2, Ahmed Aloulou ×2, Connor McLaren, Scott Mollison	Newry L.C, Northern Ireland
Gibraltar	Away	27-10-2018	Friendly	3–0	Scott Smith, Kyle Ballingall, Connor Mclaren	Gibraltar
Gibraltar	Away	28-10-2018	Friendly	4–1	Ryan Robb ×2, Connor Mclaren, Lee Cameron	Gibraltar
Northern Ireland	Away	30-11-2018	Home Nations	2–6	Dayle Robertson ×2, Scott Smith ×2, Fraser Smith, Craig McLeish	Nerwy, Northern Ireland
England	Away	01-12-2018	Home Nations	3–1	Craig McLeish	Nerwy, Northern Ireland
Wales	Away	02-12-2018	Home Nations	6–2	Craig Holmes, Kyle Ballingall	Nerwy, Northern Ireland
Turkey	Away	29-01-2019	FIFA 2020 World Cup Prem Rd	4–3	Connor McLaren ×2, James Yates	Zenica City, Bosnia & Herzegovina
Bosnia and Herzegovina	Away	30-01-2019	FIFA 2020 World Cup Prem Rd	10–1	Brad Steedman	Zenica City, Bosnia & Herzegovina
Switzerland	Away	01-02-2019	FIFA 2020 World Cup Prem Rd	4–1	Scott Smith	Zenica City, Bosnia & Herzegovina
England	Away	29-11-2019	Home Nations	1-5	Connor McLaren	St Georges Park, England
Wales	Away	30-11-2019	Home NAtions	3-3	Dayle Robertson, Ryan Robb, Ahmed Aloulou	St Georges Park, England
Northern Ireland	Away	01-02-2019	Home Nations	3-5	Connor McLaren x2, Dayle Robertson	St Georges Park, England
Montenegro	Away	29-01-2020	UEFA Euro 2022 Qual	9-2	A Aloulou, Dayle Robertson	Herentals, Belgium
Belgium	Away	30-01-2020	UEFA Euro 2022 Qual	7-3	A Aloulou X 2, OWN GOAL	Herentals, Belgium
Armenia	Away	01-02-2020	UEFA Euro 2022 Qual	2-2	Steedman, F Smith	Herentals, Belgium
Armenia	Away	9-04-2022	World Cup 2022 Qual	0-11	none	Varna Bulgaria
Kosovo	Away	10-04-2022	World Cup 2022 Qual	1-4	Steedman	Varna Bulgaria
Bulgaria	Away	11-04-2022	World Cup 2022 Qual	2-9	Conor McLaren / Ryan Robb	Varna Bulgaria
Northern Ireland	Home	07-10-2023	Friendly	1-2	K Brand	DISC, DUNDEE
Northern Ireland	Home	08-10-2023	Friendly	0-4	N/A	DISC, DUNDEE
Switzerland	Away	11-04-2024	Futsal Euro 2026 Qualifying Rd	1-3	Holness	Bern, Switzerland
Malta	Away	10-04-2024	Futsal Euro 2026 Qualifying Rd	1-4	Lawless	Bern, Switzerland
Gibraltar	Away	13-04-2024	Futsal Euro 2026 Qualifying Rd	1-4	Mclaren	Bern, Switzerland
Morocco	Away	22-01-2026	Futsal Week - January Cup 26	1-12	James Grant	Labin, Croatia
Switzerland	Away	23-01-2026	Futsal Week - January Cup 26	1-5	Calen Holness	Labin, Croatia
Malta	Away	25-01-2026	Futsal Week - January Cup 26	2-5	Noah Lucas, Gavin Ritchie	Labin, Croatia
Andorra	Away	8-04-2026	FIFA Futsal W/C Prelim Rd	0-10	n/a	Hjorring, Denmark
Denmark	Away	9-04-2026	FIFA Futsal W/C Prelim Rd	1-3	Chris Angus	Hjorring, Denmark
Malta	Away	1-04-2026	FIFA Futsal W/C Prelim Rd	0-0		Hjorring, Denmark

== Scotland vs opponent (Updated April 2026) ==
Opponent	Wins	Draws	Losses	Goals
Armenia	0	1	2	3–19
Belgium	1	0	0	7–3
Bosnia and Herzegovina	0	0	1	1–10
England	0	0	4	2–22
Gibraltar	4	0	1	16–10
Georgia	0	0	1	0–11
Israel	0	0	2	3–12
Montenegro	1	0	0	9–2
Northern Ireland	5	1	2	36–24
Sweden	0	0	1	0–13
Switzerland	0	0	4	5–19
Turkey	0	0	1	3–4
Wales	0	2	2	10–17
Kosovo	0	0	1	1-4
Bulgaria	0	0	1	2-9
Malta	0	0	2	3-9
Morocco	0	0	1	1-12
Denmark	0	0	1	1-3
Andorra	0	0	1	0-10
17 Countries	11	4	24	92–225

== Scotland Player Caps ==
These players have all represented the Scotland national futsal team. (as of April 2026)

No	Name	Caps	Official Caps (Euro's / FIFA)
1	Ben O'Hanlon	46	24
2	Scott Mollison	24	9
3	Fraser Smith	24	12
4	Ryan Robb	22	6
5	Craig McLeish	15	6
6	Dayle Robertson	20	8
7	James Yates	13	9
8	Jack Guthrie	11	3
9	Kyle Ballingall	28	15
10	Craig Holmes	10	3
11	Neil Laurenson	10	0
12	Kevin Hagan	9	0
13	Mark Caldow	9	6
14	Scott Smith	29	15
15	Gordon McGillivray	8	6
16	Andrew McCulloch	8	6
17	Scott Chaplain	8	3
18	Ross Chisholm	10	6
19	Martin Cassells	18	9
20	Richard Horlock	5	3
21	Sean Mushin	5	3
22	Rhys Davis	5	3
23	Brad Steedman	16	9
24	John McLean	4	3
25	Ahmed Aloulou	25	12
26	Lee Cameron	5	3
27	Conor McLaren	25	12
28	Paul McLaughlin	4	0
29	Alan Cunnigham	9	6
30	Graham Muir	3	3
31	Scott Lafftery	3	3
32	Garry Hay	3	3
33	James Grady	3	3
34	Adam Whitelaw	5	0
35	David Mennie	5	3
36	Jamie Forsyth	2	0
37	Connor Thomson	2	0
38	Laim Kelly	2	0
39	Joe Andrew	2	0
40	Paul Simpson	2	0
41	Youssef Aloulou	4	0
41	Daniel Mackenzie	4	3
41	Derryn Kesson	3	3
42	Darren Clarkson	11	6
43	Craig Rathey	1	0
44	Scott Ballingall	1	0
45	Kenny Hynd	1	0
46	Michael Connor	1	0
47	James Gunn	12	6
48	Josh Clark	12	6
49	Lewis Mckay	2	0
50	Mark Duigan	6	3
51	Louie Anderson	3	3
52	Robert Black	15	9
53	Grant Campbell	1	0
54	Cameron Taylor	1	0
55	Kairn Brand	1	0
56	Kai Lawless	14	9
57	Oscar Lucas	8	6
58	Chris Angus	13	6
59	Adam Binnie	1	0
60	Adam Fairweather	13	3
61	Lewis Mackie	1	0
62	Callum Husband	7	3
64	James Grant	13	9
65	Mark Chisholm	3	3
66	Gavin Ritchie	9	6
67	Noah Lucas	6	3
68	Caleb Holness	8	3
69	Ellis Stevenson	6	3
70	Jamie Bell	4	0
71	Ross Cameron	7	3
72	John Howard	3	3
73	Dani Angus Real	3	3

== Scotland Player Goals ==
These players have all scored for Scotland national futsal team. (as of 01-2026)

Name	All Goals	Euro Goals	FIFA Goals
Scott Mollison	7	0	0
Craig McLeish	7	0	0
Ahmed Aloulou	8	3	0
Sean Mushin	4	2	0
Kyle Ballingall	4	0	0
Dayle Robertson	6	1	0
Scott Smith	5	0	1
Fraser Smith	4	1	0
Connor McLaren	10	0	4
Joe Andrew	3	0	0
Jack Guthrie	3	0	0
Kevin Hagan	2	0	0
Rhys Davis	2	1	0
Brad Steedman	2	1	1
Mark Caldow	1	0	0
James Yates	2	1	1
Jamie Forsyth	1	0	0
Gary Hay	1	1	0
Scott Lafferty	1	0	0
Lee Cameron	2	0	0
Ryan Robb	4	0	1
Craig Holmes	1	0	0
Neil Laurenson	1	0	0
Kairn Brand	1	0	0
Caleb Holness	2	0	1
Kai Lawless	3	1	1
Gavin Ritchie	1	0	0
James Grant	1	0	0
Noah Lucus	1	0	0
Chris Angus	1	0	1

== Coaching staff ==
Year	Head coach	Coaches	Played	Win	Drawn	Lost
2021–present	Gordon McGillivray	Ross Chisholm (Assist) / John Mclean (c) / Steve McLean (c)	14	0	1 (1st W/C pt)	13
2018 - 2021	Scott Chaplain	Ross Chisholm (Assist) Gordon McGillivray (GK) / Gavin Beth (c) / Steve McLean (c)	16	4	3	9
2017 (Interim)	Gerry McMonagle	Ross Chisholm (Assist) / Gordon (GK) McGillivray / Steve McLean (C)	3	1	1	1
2014 - 2017	Mark Potter	Gerry McMonagle (Assist) / Chris Smith (Assist) / Gordon McGillivray (GK) / Steve McLean (C)	11	3	0	8
