= Eric Ramsay (football manager) =

Welsh football manager (born 1991)

Personal information
- Date of birth: 2 August 1991 (age 35)
- Place of birth: Shrewsbury, England

Youth career
- Shrewsbury Town
- The New Saints

Senior career*
Years	Team	Apps	(Gls)
	Welshpool Town	14	
	Loughborough University	28	

International career
2013	Wales futsal		

Managerial career
- 2024–2026: Minnesota United
- 2026: West Bromwich Albion
- * Club domestic league appearances and goals

Eric Ramsay (born 2 August 1991) is an English professional football coach and former player who was most recently the head coach of EFL Championship club West Bromwich Albion.

Born in England, he was captain of the Welsh national futsal team.

After a short period playing in the Cymru Premier, Ramsay began his coaching career in the academy of Swansea City before moving to Shrewsbury Town in 2017. He later spent two years working in the academy of Chelsea. In 2021, aged 29, he was appointed assistant first-team coach at Manchester United. He also had a brief coaching spell with the Wales national football team in 2023. In February 2024, he was appointed head coach of Major League Soccer club Minnesota United. In January 2026, Ramsay was appointed head coach of EFL Championship side West Bromwich Albion, but was dismissed on 24 February 2026 after going winless in nine matches.

== Early life ==
Born in Shrewsbury, England, Ramsay grew up in Llanfyllin, Wales, and attended Llanfyllin High School. After leaving the youth academy at The New Saints with North Shropshire College, Ramsay made 14 appearances as a player in the Cymru Premier for Welshpool Town, before deciding to attend university and focus on coaching. Ramsay was the captain of the Wales national futsal team for the UEFA Futsal Euro 2014 qualifying campaign, a sport he played throughout his time at Loughborough University.

== Career ==
=== Early career ===
In 2013, Ramsay graduated from Loughborough University with a first-class honours degree in Sport Science with Management. At Loughborough, Ramsay worked as an assistant coach alongside Kieran McKenna at the university's football team.

After graduating, Ramsay spent nearly four years as a Lead Professional Development Phase Coach at Premier League club Swansea City, coaching the club's under-21s and under-18s. He became academy manager at Shrewsbury Town in 2017, and subsequently worked with the club's first-team as interim manager then first-team coach. Ramsay joined Chelsea in 2019, where he coached the club's under-23s, and became the youngest British coach to achieve the UEFA Pro Licence.

=== Manchester United and Wales ===
In 2021, Ramsay joined Manchester United as a player development coach under manager Ole Gunnar Solskjaer. In the following years, he became a more integral part of the club's coaching set-up, working under managers Ralf Rangnick and Erik ten Hag, winning the EFL Cup and reaching the FA Cup final with the latter in 2023. At United, Ramsay helped integrate foreign players such as Casemiro into the club, due to his ability to speak fluent Spanish and French.

Alongside his duties at Manchester United, Ramsay joined the Wales national football team as an assistant coach in March 2023. On Ramsay's announcement, the Wales manager Rob Page said: "Eric is arguably one of the best young coaches in football at this moment in time". Six months later, he left his position at Wales to focus on Manchester United and his young family.

=== Minnesota United ===
On 22 February 2024, Ramsay was hired as the head coach of Major League Soccer club Minnesota United shortly after the start of the regular season. He became the youngest permanent head coach in MLS history and signed a multi-year contract with the club. Ramsay's debut as head coach of Minnesota saw a 2–0 home win vs Los Angeles on March 16. Minnesota made the club's best start to a season in history under Ramsay, with the club topping the Western Conference after twelve games with 24 points. Ramsay returned Minnesota to the MLS playoffs with a 6th placed finish in the Western Conference (MLS) in his first season in charge, breaking club records for goals scored, away points and consecutive clean sheets. Minnesota finished in ninth place in the overall Supporters' Shield standings and reached the playoff semifinal in Ramsay's debut season as head coach.

On May 10th, 2025, Minnesota defeated Inter Miami 4–1 at Allianz Field, for which Ramsay was named MLS manager of the week for the third time in his tenure. Minnesota ultimately achieved the franchise's best ever regular season in 2025; the club broke its previous records for total points, wins, goals scored, goals conceded, clean sheets and longest unbeaten run as it finished fourth place in the Western Conference (MLS). Subsequently, the club reached the playoff semifinal for the second time in two seasons, with Ramsay credited with having turned Minnesota into one of the league's most competitive teams. As well as Minnesota's progression to the U.S. Open Cup semifinal, this season was also notable for the record transfer of Tani Oluwaseyi to Villarreal.

=== West Bromwich Albion ===
On 11 January 2026, Ramsay was appointed head coach of West Bromwich Albion following the dismissal of Ryan Mason. He managed his first game a week later, a 3–2 defeat to Middlesbrough. On 20 January, the club were defeated 5–0 by Norwich City. Three days later, on 23 January 2026, Ramsay earned his first point as head coach in a 1–1 draw with Derby County, after Chris Mepham scored an equaliser in the fifth minute of added time.

Following a 1–1 draw against Charlton Athletic on 24 February, Ramsay was dismissed. He oversaw nine matches in charge without recording a win and left the club 21st in the EFL Championship, one point above the relegation zone.

== Managerial statistics ==
As of 24 February 2026

Managerial record by team and tenure
Team	From	To	Record					Ref.
Team	From	To	P	W	D	L	Win %	Ref.
Minnesota United	22 February 2024	11 January 2026	81	34	21	26	42.0	
West Bromwich Albion	11 January 2026	24 February 2026	9	0	4	5	0.0	
Total			90	34	25	31	37.8	
