= Israel national futsal team =

Israel
- Nickname(s): הכחולים-לבנים (The Blue and Whites)
- Association: Israel Football Association
- Confederation: UEFA (Europe)
- FIFA code: ISR
- FIFA ranking: 98 ▲1 (8 May 2026)
Home colours	Away colours

First international
- Israel 1–5 Bosnia and Herzegovina (Figueira da Foz, Portugal; December 5, 1998)

Biggest win
- Israel 6–1 Scotland (Skövde, Sweden; January 17, 2015)

Biggest defeat
- Belarus 14–0 Israel (Minsk, Belarus; 6 April 2021)

FIFA World Cup
- Appearances: 0

AMF World Cup
- Appearances: 2 (First in 1994)
- Best result: First Round (1994, 1997)

UEFA Futsal Championship
- Appearances: 0

The Israel national futsal team is controlled by the Israel Football Association, the governing body for futsal in Israel and represents the country in international futsal competitions, such as the World Cup and the European Championships.

== Competition history ==
=== FIFA Futsal World Cup ===
FIFA Futsal World Cup record								Qualification record						
Year	Round	Pld	W	D	L	GF	GA	Outcome	Pld	W	D	L	GF	GA
(Netherlands) 1989	Did not enter							Did not enter						
(Hong Kong) 1992	Did not enter							Did not enter						
(Spain) 1996	Did not enter							Did not enter						
(Guatemala) 2000	Did not qualify							Group E 4th place	4	1	0	3	7	17
(Taiwan) 2004	Did not qualify							Group 9 Runners-up	2	1	0	1	7	6
(Brazil) 2008	Did not qualify							Group 10 Runners-up	3	2	0	1	5	4
(Thailand) 2012	Did not qualify							Group 3 3rd place	3	0	2	1	9	10
(Colombia) 2016	Did not qualify							Group E 4th place	3	0	0	3	8	15
(Lithuania) 2021	Did not qualify							Group D 3rd place	3	0	2	1	3	10
(Uzbekistan) 2024	Did not qualify							Group 7 3rd place	7	1	2	4	9	27
Total	0/10	0	0	0	0	0	0	7/10	25	5	6	14	48	89

=== UEFA Futsal Euro ===
UEFA Futsal Euro record								Qualification record						
Year	Round	Pld	W	D	L	GF	GA	Outcome	Pld	W	D	L	GF	GA
(Spain) 1996	Did not enter							Did not enter						
(Spain) 1999	Did not qualify							Group G 4th place	3	0	0	3	3	19
(Russia) 2001	Did not qualify							Group E 3rd place	3	1	0	2	7	9
(Italy) 2003	Did not qualify							Group A 3rd place	3	0	1	2	5	12
(Czech Republic) 2005	Did not qualify							Group A 4th place	3	0	0	3	3	15
(Portugal) 2007	Did not qualify							Group B 3rd place	3	1	0	2	6	12
(Hungary) 2010	Did not qualify							Group D 3rd place	3	1	1	1	6	6
(Croatia) 2012	Did not qualify							Group F 3rd place	3	1	0	2	7	11
(Belgium) 2014	Did not qualify							Group E Runners-up	3	1	1	1	9	8
(Serbia) 2016	Did not qualify							Group F 3rd place	3	1	1	1	8	7
(Slovenia) 2018	Did not qualify							Group A 3rd place	3	1	0	2	6	8
(Netherlands) 2022	Did not qualify							Group 5 4th place	10	2	2	6	17	42
(Latvia) (Lithuania) (Slovenia) 2026	Did not qualify							Group B 3rd place	3	0	2	1	3	4
Total	0/13	0	0	0	0	0	0	12/13	43	9	8	26	80	153

== Players ==
=== Current squad ===
The following players were called up to the squad for the 2028 FIFA Futsal World Cup qualifying matches against Greece, Estonia and Norway on 11, 12 and 14 April 2026 respectively.

No.	Pos.	Player	Date of birth (age)	Caps	Goals	Club
1	GK	Maksym Khrypunov	17 February 1989 (age 37)			(Israel Football Association) Maccabi Netanya Futsal
2	GK	David Biton	2 August 1988 (age 37)			(Israel Football Association) Ramat Gan Futsal Club
5	DF	Jonatan Dayan	13 April 2005 (age 21)			(Israel Football Association) Arad Futsal Club
12	DF	Eitan Komisarov-Koval	16 January 2001 (age 25)			(Israel Football Association) Ramat Gan Futsal Club
14	DF	Adam Cohen (captain)	20 December 1980 (age 45)			(Israel Football Association) Maccabi Netanya Futsal
15	DF	Tomer Bourshan	12 June 2002 (age 24)			(Israel Football Association) Reichman Futsal
7	FW	Itzhak Halevy	30 November 1994 (age 31)			(Israel Football Association) Dolphins Ashdod
8	FW	Dan Bar-El	9 June 1993 (age 33)			(Israel Football Association) Maccabi Netanya Futsal
9	FW	Mahmoud Taha	21 February 1996 (age 30)			(Israel Football Association) Maccabi Netanya Futsal
10	FW	Tamir Shkolnik	4 January 1991 (age 35)			(Israel Football Association) Maccabi Netanya Futsal
11	FW	Stav Ben Aharon	10 January 1996 (age 30)			(Israel Football Association) Rishon LeZion Futsal Club
16	FW	Asaf Galgut	4 June 1996 (age 30)			(Israel Football Association) Maccabi Netanya Futsal
17	FW	Ariel Cohen	18 August 2002 (age 23)			(Israel Football Association) Rishon LeZion Futsal Club
19	FW	Yotam Yehezkel Hadad	27 January 2002 (age 24)			(Israel Football Association) Maccabi Nahalat Yitzhak Tel Aviv
