= Gibraltar national futsal team =

Gibraltar
- Nickname(s): Team 54
- Association: Gibraltar Football Association
- Confederation: UEFA (Europe)
- Head coach: (Spain) José Carlos Gil
- Captain: Naoufal El Andaloussi
- Most caps: Andrew Lopez (20)
- Top scorer: Andrew Lopez (10)
- Home stadium: Victoria Stadium
- FIFA code: GIB
- FIFA ranking: 127 ▼8 (8 May 2026)
- Highest FIFA ranking: 91 (19 October 2015)
- Lowest FIFA ranking: 113 (12 May 2020)
Home colours	Away colours

First international
- Gibraltar 2–10 Montenegro (Nice, France; 23 January 2013)

Biggest win
- Gibraltar 4–1 Scotland (Bern, Switzerland; 13 April 2024)

Biggest defeat
- Georgia 15–1 Gibraltar (Ciorescu, Moldova; 22 October 2015)

FIFA World Cup
- Appearances: 0

European Championship
- Appearances: 0

The Gibraltar national futsal team represents Gibraltar in international futsal competitions such as the FIFA Futsal World Cup and the European Championships and is controlled by the Gibraltar Football Association.

== Competitive record ==
=== FIFA Futsal World Cup ===
FIFA Futsal World Cup record								Qualification record						
Year	Round	Pld	W	D	L	GF	GA	Outcome	Pld	W	D	L	GF	GA
(Netherlands) 1989	Not a FIFA member							Not a FIFA member						
(Hong Kong) 1992	Not a FIFA member							Not a FIFA member						
(Spain) 1996	Not a FIFA member							Not a FIFA member						
(Guatemala) 2000	Not a FIFA member							Not a FIFA member						
(Taiwan) 2004	Not a FIFA member							Not a FIFA member						
(Brazil) 2008	Not a FIFA member							Not a FIFA member						
(Thailand) 2012	Not a FIFA member							Not a FIFA member						
(Colombia) 2016	Did not qualify							Group A 4th place	3	0	0	3	5	31
(Lithuania) 2021	Did not qualify							Group A 4th place	3	0	0	3	1	24
(Uzbekistan) 2024	Did not qualify							Group A 3rd place	3	1	0	2	2	14
Total	0/10	0	0	0	0	0	0	3/10	9	1	0	8	8	69

=== UEFA Futsal Championship ===
UEFA Futsal Euro record								Qualification record						
Year	Round	Pld	W	D	L	GF	GA	Outcome	Pld	W	D	L	GF	GA
(Spain) 1996	Not a UEFA member							Not a UEFA member						
(Spain) 1999	Not a UEFA member							Not a UEFA member						
(Russia) 2001	Not a UEFA member							Not a UEFA member						
(Italy) 2003	Not a UEFA member							Not a UEFA member						
(Czech Republic) 2005	Not a UEFA member							Not a UEFA member						
(Portugal) 2007	Not a UEFA member							Not a UEFA member						
(Hungary) 2010	Not a UEFA member							Not a UEFA member						
(Croatia) 2012	Not a UEFA member							Not a UEFA member						
(Belgium) 2014	Did not qualify							Group A 3rd place	3	1	0	2	11	21
(Serbia) 2016	Did not qualify							Group A 4th place	3	0	0	3	2	15
(Slovenia) 2018	Did not qualify							Group G 3rd place	2	0	0	2	2	13
(Netherlands) 2022	Did not qualify							Group A 4th place	3	0	0	3	3	16
(Latvia) (Lithuania) (Slovenia) 2026	Did not qualify							Group C 3rd place	3	1	0	2	4	16
Total	0/13	0	0	0	0	0	0	5/13	14	2	0	12	22	81

== Players ==
=== Current squad ===
The following players were called up to the squad for the 2028 FIFA Futsal World Cup qualifying matches against Kosovo, Montenegro and Austria on 9, 10 and 12 April 2026 respectively.

No.	Pos.	Player	Date of birth (age)	Caps	Goals	Club
1	GK	Lee Mifsud	14 December 2005 (age 20)			(The Football Association) NTU Futsal
13	GK	Jesse Figueras	1 June 2004 (age 22)			(Gibraltar Football Association) Europa FC
2	DF	Kaydan Glynn	16 May 2005 (age 21)			(Gibraltar Football Association) Bavaria FC
3	DF	Christopher Remorino	24 October 1992 (age 33)			(Gibraltar Football Association) Bavaria FC
4	DF	Nicholas Castle	18 January 1994 (age 32)			(Gibraltar Football Association) Bavaria FC
5	DF	Ethan Perez	14 October 1998 (age 27)			(Gibraltar Football Association) Lynx FC
6	DF	Ethan Moya	9 October 2000 (age 25)			(Gibraltar Football Association) Argus High Flyers
12	DF	Dylan Duo	17 January 2006 (age 20)			(Football Association of Wales) Cardiff Metropolitan Futsal
7	FW	Naoufal El Andaloussi (captain)	7 April 1991 (age 35)			(Gibraltar Football Association) Europa FC
8	FW	Sean Perera	29 February 2004 (age 22)			(Gibraltar Football Association) Popay Lek
9	FW	Jay Pitaluga	27 November 1998 (age 27)			(Gibraltar Football Association) Bavaria FC
10	FW	Ashley Rodriguez	13 November 1989 (age 36)			(Gibraltar Football Association) Bavaria FC
11	FW	Alan Parker	15 May 1996 (age 30)			(Gibraltar Football Association) Argus High Flyers
14	FW	Hatim Smith	25 December 2000 (age 25)			(Gibraltar Football Association) Popay Lek

=== Recent call-ups ===
The following players have also been called up to the squad within the last 12 months.

Pos.	Player	Date of birth (age)	Caps	Goals	Club	Latest call-up
GK	John Paul Hernandez	8 March 2002 (age 24)			(Gibraltar) Popay Lek	v. Estonia, 21 December 2025
DF	Lee Soiza	26 April 2004 (age 22)			(Gibraltar) Popay Lek	v. Estonia, 21 December 2025
FW	James Castle	13 June 1997 (age 29)			(Gibraltar) Zoca Bastion	v. Estonia, 21 December 2025
FW	Stefan Viagas	13 July 2000 (age 26)			(Gibraltar) Argus High Flyers	v. Estonia, 21 December 2025
^{INJ} Player withdrew from the squad due to an injury.^{PRE} Preliminary squad.^{RET} Retired from international futsal.
