= Rico Zulkarnain =

Welsh futsal player

Personal information
- Full name: Rico Iskandar Arifin Zulkarnain
- Date of birth: 8 November 1989 (age 36)
- Place of birth: Wales
- Positions: Midfielder; winger; forward

Senior career*
Years	Team	Apps	(Gls)
–2007	Newport County	0	(0)
2008–2013	PILL FC		
2013–2014	Taff's Well		
2014–2015	Cardiff		
2015	IPC Pelindo II		
2016	Fitzroy		
2017	IPC Pelindo II		
2017	Permata Indah Manokwari		
2017	Pahang Rangers		
2017–2018	Mumbai Warriors		
2023	Pendekar United		

International career
2013–	Wales (futsal)		
- * Club domestic league appearances and goals

Rico Zulkarnain (born 8 November 1989) is a Wales futsal player.

== Career ==
In 2015, Rico's move to Indonesia stems from the media containing his desire to play professionally in Indonesia. His desire was welcomed by FC Libido Bandung and IPC Pelindo II. Rico finally chose to join Pelindo II. He officially became part of the Pelindo squad and made history as the first Welsh player to sign a professional futsal contract in the Indonesia Pro Futsal League. With his club, he successfully won the 2015 Futsal Super League title.

Rico moved to Australia and played in the Australian futsal league with Fitzroy FC.

== Personal life ==
Born in Wales, Rico is of Indonesian descent.
