= Ahmed Aloulou =

Tunisian footballer (born 1996)

Personal information
- Date of birth: 15 July 1996 (age 30)
- Place of birth: Sfax, Tunisia
- Position: Forward

Team information
- Current team: Monterosa F.C.

Senior career*
Years	Team	Apps	(Gls)
2018–2019	Alloa Athletic	1	(0)
2019	→ Berwick Rangers (loan)	9	(0)
2019-2020	Stenhousemuir F.C.	0	(0)
- * Club domestic league appearances and goals as of 12:37, 17 January 2020 (UTC)

Ahmed Aloulou (born 15 July 1996) is a Tunisian professional footballer, who is currently playing for Monterosa F.C., as a forward. Aloulou has previously played for Alloa Athletic and Berwick Rangers on loan.

== Early and personal life ==
Ahmed was born in Sfax. His father was an engineer, and the family moved around, including spending 8 years in Aberdeen (where Ahmed began playing football) before moving to Romania in 2010. He studied for a mechanical engineering degree at Dundee University.

== Futsal career ==
Ahmed played club futsal for Dundee Futsal whilst attending university.

He represented Scotland at international futsal, earning 5 caps.

== Football career ==
After graduating from university in the summer of 2018, Ahmed trialled for Alloa Athletic before being offered a contract. He made his debut for Alloa on 8 September 2018, becoming "the first player to graduate from Scotland's futsal set-up to 11-a-side senior football". In January 2019 he moved on loan to Berwick Rangers taking the number 10 shirt. He made his debut for Berwick on 9 February in Scottish league 2 against Stirling Albion which ended in a 2–1 loss. Ahmed made 9 appearances during his time at Berwick Rangers, all occurring in Scottish League Two as Berwick Rangers finished bottom of the table. Berwick Rangers F.C. went on to lose 7–0 on aggregate to Cove Rangers in the playoffs which led to them being relegated to the Lowland League. On 1 July 2019, Ahmed was released by Alloa Athletic F.C. On 20 December 2019, Aloulou signed for Stenhousemuir F.C. but was released in July 2020 without making a single appearance.

== Playing style ==
Ahmed has been described by Alloa Athletic as "technically very good, has decent pace and is good at linking the game up".

== Career statistics ==
Appearances and goals by club, season and competition
Club	Season	League			Scottish Cup		League Cup		Other		Total	
Club	Season	Division	Apps	Goals	Apps	Goals	Apps	Goals	Apps	Goals	Apps	Goals
Alloa Athletic	2018–19	Scottish Championship	1	0	1	0	0	0	2	0	4	0
Berwick Rangers (loan)	2018–19	Scottish League Two	9	0	0	0	0	0	0	0	9	0
Stenhousemuir F.C.	2019-20	Scottish League Two	-	-	-	-	-	-	-	-	-	-
Career total			10	0	1	0	0	0	0	0	13	0
