= Yosif Shutev =

Bulgarian footballer

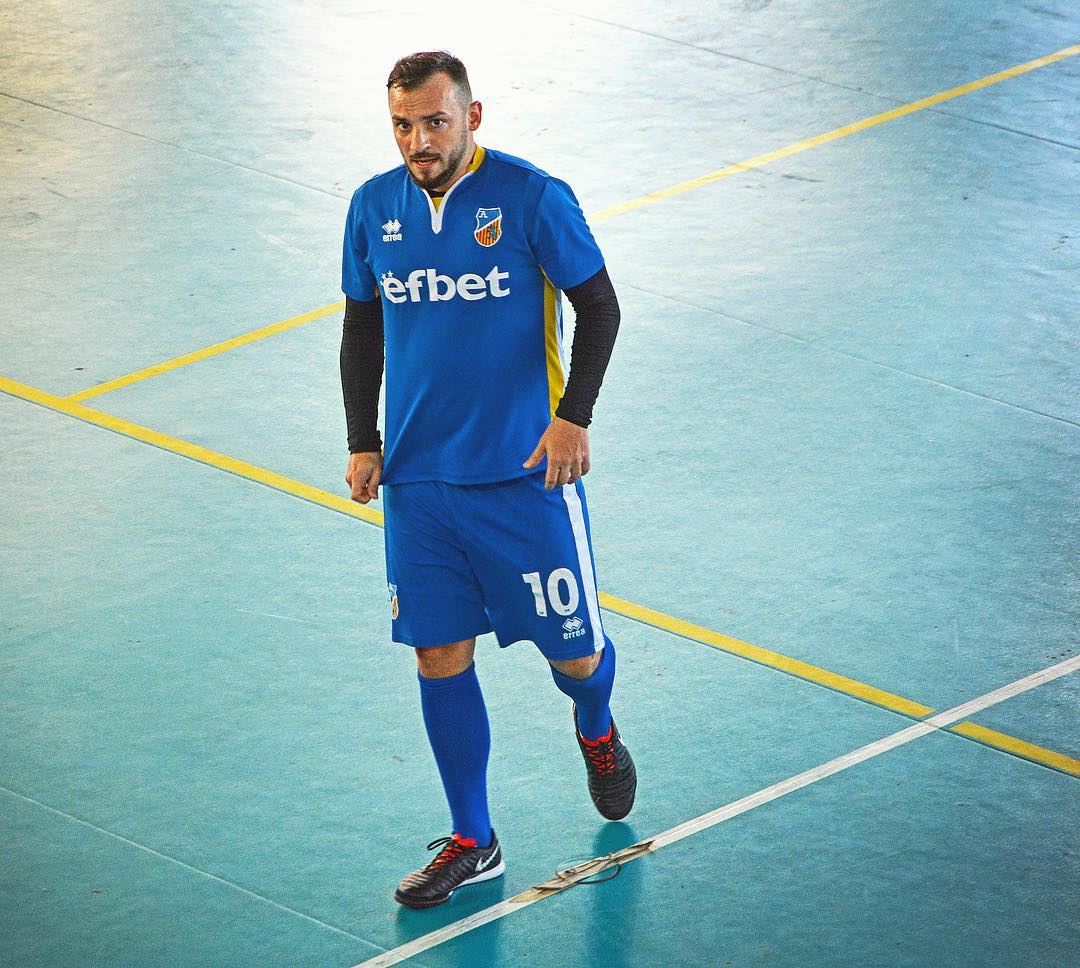

Personal information
- Full name: Yosif Miroslavov Shutev
- Date of birth: 6 February 1986 (age 40)
- Place of birth: Bulgaria
- Height: 1.75 m (5 ft 9 in)
- Positions: Forward; midfielder

Youth career
- 2000 - 2004: CSKA

Senior career*
Years	Team	Apps	(Gls)
2005 - 2006	Koneliano	20	(5)
2006 - 2007	Chernomorets Burgas Sofia	25	(4)
2007 - 2009	Nesebar	35	(10)
2010 - 2010	Lokomotiv Stara Zagora	10	(3)
2011 - 2012	Shumen	15	(3)
Total		105	(25)

International career
2002 - 2003	Bulgaria U17	10	(7)
- * Club domestic league appearances and goals

Yosif Shutev (first name also sometimes transliterated as Iosif) (Bulgarian: Йосиф Шутев) (born 6 February 1986) is a Bulgarian footballer.

== Career ==
Early Chapter

Shutev has played for Koneliano, Chernomorets Burgas Sofia, Nesebar, Lokomotiv Stara Zagora, and Shumen. He is also a member of the Bulgaria national indoor football team. He retired in 2012.

Futsal: The return

In 2015, Shutev joined Levski Sofia Futsal where he was a key player for 8 years, approximately 240 games.
