= Vlad Iancu =

Romanian futsal player

Personal information
- Full name: Vlad Iancu
- Date of birth: 3 January 1978 (age 48)
- Place of birth: Romania
- Position: Goalkeeper

Team information
- Current team: CS Informatica Timişoara
- Number: 1

International career
Years	Team	Apps	(Gls)
- Romania

Vlad Iancu (born 3 January 1978), is a Romanian futsal player who plays for CS Informatica Timişoara and the Romanian national futsal team.
