= Danil Kutuzov =

Russian futsal player

Kutuzov
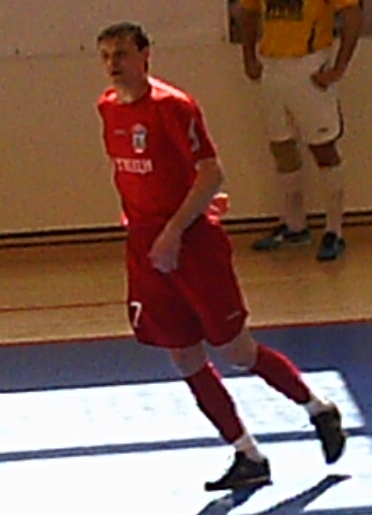
- Kutuzov in 2010

Personal information
- Full name: Danil Kutuzov
- Date of birth: 13 March 1987 (age 39)
- Place of birth: Glazov, Soviet Union
- Height: 1.80 m (5 ft 11 in)
- Position: Winger

Team information
- Current team: MFK Dina Moskva

Senior career*
Years	Team	Apps	(Gls)
2002–2004	Progress		
2006–2008	Lipetsk		
2008–2012	Mytishchi		
2012–	MFK Dina Moskva	79	(21)

International career^{‡}
2008–	Russia	21	(6)
- * Club domestic league appearances and goals as of 2 April 2015 ‡ National team caps and goals as of European Championships Silver Antwerp 2014

Danil Kutuzov (born 13 March 1987) is a Russian futsal player who plays for MFK Dina Moskva and the Russian national futsal team.

== Biography ==
Daniil is a graduate of the Rudnenskiy futsal. At the start of his career he was playing for Glazov "Progress" in the Premier League. In the Super League he debuted for "Lipetsk" in 2006, soon he became one of team leaders. In December 2008, due to financial problems of the Lipetsk club he moved to "Mytishchi". Before the start of the 2012/13 season he was invited to the Moscow club "Dina", where he first won the national championship.

In 2008, Kutuzov won the first European Youth League. In the final game Daniel scored a goal. He also played for the adult national Russian team and took part in several exhibition games.

== Achievements ==
- European Youth League Winner (1): 2008
- Russian Futsal Championship Winner (1): 2014
