= Yasin Erdal =

Turkish-Dutch futsal player

Yasin Erdal (born 30 May 1986) is a Turkish-Dutch futsal player. He currently plays for LZV Marku Bouw and is a member of the Turkey national futsal team in the UEFA Futsal Championship.
