= David Cupák =

Czech futsal player

Personal information
- Date of birth: 27 May 1989 (age 37)
- Place of birth: Brno, Czechoslovakia
- Height: 1.82 m (5 ft 11 1/2 in)
- Position: Defender

Senior career*
Years	Team	Apps	(Gls)
2009–2010	FC Zbrojovka Brno	5	(0)
- * Club domestic league appearances and goals

David Cupák (born 27 May 1989 in Brno) is a Czech futsal player, currently playing for KAJOT Helas Brno. He has played professional football for 1.FC Brno.

== Football career ==
Cupák played five games for FC Zbrojovka Brno in the Gambrinus liga.

== Futsal career ==
Cupák represented the Czech Republic national futsal team at the FIFA Futsal World Cup 2008. Cupák also represented the Czech Republic national futsal team at the UEFA Futsal Euro 2014 in Belgium and UEFA Futsal Euro 2016 in Serbia.
