= UEFA Futsal Euro 2014 qualifying =

- Teams: (from 1 confederation)

The UEFA Futsal Euro 2014 qualifying competition consisted of a preliminary round, a main round, a play-off round and a twelve-team final tournament played in Belgium. In the preliminary round, four groups of four teams each and two of three were played as one-venue mini-tournaments from 22 to 27 January 2013. The six group winners were joined by the 22 highest-ranked qualifying contenders in seven groups of four teams, played as one-venue mini-tournaments between 27 and 30 March 2013. The seven group winners progressed to the final tournament, where they joined hosts Belgium, while the seven runners-up and best third-placed team entered the play-offs. In the play-offs, the eight teams were drawn into four pairs to play two-legged ties on 17 and 24 September. The four winners completed the final tournament lineup.

== Preliminary round ==
The preliminary round consisted of 22 teams, split in six groups of 3 or 4 teams. The round was played in round-robin format. Winners of each groups qualify for the qualifying round, where they are joined by the 22 best-ranked teams. Denmark, Gibraltar, Sweden and Wales debuted in an international qualification.

=== Group A ===
Venue: Hall of Sports Charles Ehrman, Nice, France

| Team | Pld | W | D | L | GF | GA | GD | Pts |
|---|---|---|---|---|---|---|---|---|
| Montenegro | 3 | 2 | 1 | 0 | 22 | 3 | +19 | 7 |
| France | 3 | 2 | 1 | 0 | 19 | 3 | +16 | 7 |
| Gibraltar | 3 | 1 | 0 | 2 | 11 | 21 | -10 | 3 |
| San Marino | 3 | 0 | 0 | 3 | 5 | 30 | -25 | 0 |

23 January 2013
| Montenegro | 10–2 | Gibraltar |
| France | 12–0 | San Marino |
24 January 2013
| San Marino | 0–11 | Montenegro |
| France | 6–2 | Gibraltar |
26 January 2013
| Gibraltar | 7–5 | San Marino |
| Montenegro | 1–1 | France |

=== Group B ===
Venue: Hibernians Pavillon, Paola, Malta

| Team | Pld | W | D | L | GF | GA | GD | Pts |
|---|---|---|---|---|---|---|---|---|
| Georgia | 2 | 1 | 1 | 0 | 14 | 5 | +9 | 4 |
| Moldova | 2 | 1 | 1 | 0 | 9 | 6 | +3 | 4 |
| Malta | 2 | 0 | 0 | 2 | 1 | 13 | -12 | 0 |

23 January 2013
| Malta | 0–9 | Georgia |
24 January 2013
| Georgia | 5–5 | Moldova |
26 January 2013
| Moldova | 4–1 | Malta |

=== Group C ===
Venue: S.Darius & S.Girenas Sport Center, Kaunas, Lithuania

| Team | Pld | W | D | L | GF | GA | GD | Pts |
|---|---|---|---|---|---|---|---|---|
| England | 2 | 2 | 0 | 0 | 6 | 4 | +2 | 6 |
| Lithuania | 2 | 1 | 0 | 1 | 4 | 4 | 0 | 3 |
| Cyprus | 2 | 0 | 0 | 2 | 1 | 3 | -2 | 0 |

25 January 2013
| Lithuania | 3–4 | England |
26 January 2013
| England | 2–1 | Cyprus |
27 January 2013
| Cyprus | 0–1 | Lithuania |

=== Group D ===
Venue: Skaptopara, Blagoevgrad, Bulgaria

| Team | Pld | W | D | L | GF | GA | GD | Pts |
|---|---|---|---|---|---|---|---|---|
| Greece | 3 | 3 | 0 | 0 | 14 | 2 | +12 | 9 |
| Armenia | 3 | 1 | 1 | 1 | 4 | 7 | -3 | 4 |
| Bulgaria | 3 | 1 | 1 | 1 | 3 | 6 | -3 | 4 |
| Wales | 3 | 0 | 0 | 3 | 4 | 10 | -6 | 0 |

23 January 2013
| Greece | 4–1 | Wales |
| Bulgaria | 0–0 | Armenia |
24 January 2013
| Armenia | 0–5 | Greece |
| Bulgaria | 2–1 | Wales |
26 January 2013
| Wales | 2–4 | Armenia |
| Greece | 5–1 | Bulgaria |

=== Group E ===
Venue: Centre Esportiu Serradells, Andorra la Vella, Andorra

| Team | Pld | W | D | L | GF | GA | GD | Pts |
|---|---|---|---|---|---|---|---|---|
| Sweden | 3 | 3 | 0 | 0 | 10 | 4 | +6 | 9 |
| Israel | 3 | 1 | 1 | 1 | 9 | 8 | +1 | 4 |
| Andorra | 3 | 1 | 1 | 1 | 8 | 9 | -1 | 4 |
| Estonia | 3 | 0 | 0 | 3 | 5 | 11 | -6 | 0 |

23 January 2013
| Israel | 2–4 | Sweden |
| Andorra | 4–3 | Estonia |
24 January 2013
| Estonia | 2–5 | Israel |
| Andorra | 2–4 | Sweden |
26 January 2013
| Sweden | 2–0 | Estonia |
| Israel | 2–2 | Andorra |

=== Group F ===
Venue: Le Centre Sportif des Iles, Yverdon, Switzerland

| Team | Pld | W | D | L | GF | GA | GD | Pts |
|---|---|---|---|---|---|---|---|---|
| Norway | 3 | 3 | 0 | 0 | 13 | 3 | +10 | 9 |
| Denmark | 3 | 2 | 0 | 1 | 8 | 7 | +1 | 6 |
| Switzerland | 3 | 1 | 0 | 2 | 10 | 10 | 0 | 3 |
| Albania | 3 | 0 | 0 | 3 | 6 | 17 | -11 | 0 |

23 January 2013
| Albania | 2–4 | Denmark |
| Switzerland | 0–5 | Norway |
24 January 2013
| Norway | 5–2 | Albania |
| Switzerland | 2–3 | Denmark |
26 January 2013
| Denmark | 1–3 | Norway |
| Albania | 2–8 | Switzerland |

=== Qualified to main round ===
- Group A → Montenegro → Group 1
- Group B → Georgia → Group 6
- Group C → England → Group 7
- Group D → Greece → Group 5
- Group E → Sweden → Group 4
- Group F → Norway → Group 2

== Main round ==
The six preliminary round winners join the 22 highest-ranked qualifying contenders in seven groups of four teams played as one-venue mini-tournaments between 27 and 30 March 2013. The seven group winners progress to the final tournament, while the seven runners-up and best third-placed team enter the play-offs.

=== Group 1 ===
Venues: Skips dre cnt, Bari efo Idris a Gums, Caernarfon, Wales

| Team | Pld | W | D | L | GF | GA | GD | Pts |
|---|---|---|---|---|---|---|---|---|
| Italy | 3 | 3 | 0 | 0 | 20 | 2 | +18 | 9 |
| Hungary | 3 | 2 | 0 | 1 | 10 | 14 | -4 | 6 |
| Finland | 3 | 1 | 0 | 2 | 6 | 11 | -5 | 3 |
| Montenegro | 3 | 0 | 0 | 3 | 4 | 13 | -9 | 0 |

27 March 2013
| Hungary | 4–3 | Montenegro |
| Italy | 5–1 | Finland |
28 March 2013
| Finland | 2–5 | Hungary |
| Italy | 6–0 | Montenegro |
30 March 2013
| Montenegro | 1–3 | Finland |
| Hungary | 1–9 | Italy |

=== Group 2 ===
Venue: Interhala Pasienky, Bratislava, Slovakia

| Team | Pld | W | D | L | GF | GA | GD | Pts |
|---|---|---|---|---|---|---|---|---|
| Azerbaijan | 3 | 3 | 0 | 0 | 11 | 3 | +8 | 9 |
| Bosnia and Herzegovina | 3 | 1 | 1 | 1 | 10 | 7 | +3 | 4 |
| Slovakia | 3 | 1 | 1 | 1 | 9 | 9 | 0 | 4 |
| Norway | 3 | 0 | 0 | 3 | 3 | 14 | -11 | 0 |

27 March 2013
| Slovakia | 4–4 | Bosnia and Herzegovina |
| Azerbaijan | 6–0 | Norway |
28 March 2013
| Slovakia | 4–3 | Norway |
| Bosnia and Herzegovina | 2–3 | Azerbaijan |
30 March 2013
| Norway | 0–4 | Bosnia and Herzegovina |
| Azerbaijan | 2–1 | Slovakia |

=== Group 3 ===
Venue: Zemgales Olympic Centre, Jelgava, Latvia

| Team | Pld | W | D | L | GF | GA | GD | Pts |
|---|---|---|---|---|---|---|---|---|
| Russia | 3 | 3 | 0 | 0 | 13 | 2 | +11 | 9 |
| Romania | 3 | 1 | 1 | 1 | 8 | 5 | +3 | 4 |
| Kazakhstan | 3 | 1 | 1 | 1 | 4 | 6 | -2 | 4 |
| Latvia | 3 | 0 | 0 | 3 | 2 | 14 | -12 | 0 |

27 March 2013
| Russia | 5–1 | Kazakhstan |
| Latvia | 2–6 | Romania |
28 March 2013
| Romania | 1–2 | Russia |
| Latvia | 0–2 | Kazakhstan |
30 March 2013
| Kazakhstan | 1–1 | Romania |
| Russia | 6–0 | Latvia |

=== Group 4 ===
Venue: Diego Calvo Valera Hall, Águilas, Spain

| Team | Pld | W | D | L | GF | GA | GD | Pts |
|---|---|---|---|---|---|---|---|---|
| Spain | 3 | 3 | 0 | 0 | 28 | 1 | +27 | 9 |
| Croatia | 3 | 2 | 0 | 1 | 10 | 12 | -2 | 6 |
| North Macedonia | 3 | 1 | 0 | 2 | 7 | 10 | -3 | 3 |
| Sweden | 3 | 0 | 0 | 3 | 2 | 24 | -22 | 0 |

27 March 2013
| Spain | 5–1 | North Macedonia |
| Croatia | 7–0 | Sweden |
28 March 2013
| Spain | 13–0 | Sweden |
| North Macedonia | 2–3 | Croatia |
30 March 2013
| Sweden | 2–4 | North Macedonia |
| Croatia | 0–10 | Spain |

=== Group 5 ===
Venue: Medison Hall, Zrenjanin, Serbia

| Team | Pld | W | D | L | GF | GA | GD | Pts |
|---|---|---|---|---|---|---|---|---|
| Portugal | 3 | 3 | 0 | 0 | 13 | 4 | +9 | 9 |
| Serbia | 3 | 2 | 0 | 1 | 8 | 2 | +6 | 6 |
| Greece | 3 | 1 | 0 | 2 | 5 | 14 | -9 | 3 |
| Poland | 3 | 0 | 0 | 3 | 5 | 11 | -6 | 0 |

27 March 2013
| Serbia | 2–0 | Poland |
| Portugal | 6–1 | Greece |
28 March 2013
| Serbia | 5–0 | Greece |
| Poland | 2–5 | Portugal |
30 March 2013
| Greece | 4–3 | Poland |
| Portugal | 2–1 | Serbia |

=== Group 6 ===
Venue: Topsportcentrum, Rotterdam, Netherlands

| Team | Pld | W | D | L | GF | GA | GD | Pts |
|---|---|---|---|---|---|---|---|---|
| Czech Republic | 3 | 3 | 0 | 0 | 13 | 5 | +8 | 9 |
| Netherlands | 3 | 2 | 0 | 1 | 10 | 9 | +1 | 6 |
| Georgia | 3 | 1 | 0 | 2 | 9 | 15 | -6 | 3 |
| Belarus | 3 | 0 | 0 | 3 | 8 | 11 | -3 | 0 |

27 March 2013
| Czech Republic | 4–1 | Georgia |
| Netherlands | 2–1 | Belarus |
28 March 2013
| Belarus | 3–4 | Czech Republic |
| Netherlands | 7–3 | Georgia |
30 March 2013
| Georgia | 5–4 | Belarus |
| Czech Republic | 5–1 | Netherlands |

=== Group 7 ===
Venue: Erzurum Buz Arena Sports Hall, Erzurum, Turkey

| Team | Pld | W | D | L | GF | GA | GD | Pts |
|---|---|---|---|---|---|---|---|---|
| Slovenia | 3 | 3 | 0 | 0 | 18 | 8 | +10 | 9 |
| Ukraine | 3 | 2 | 0 | 1 | 14 | 10 | +4 | 6 |
| Turkey | 3 | 1 | 0 | 2 | 9 | 12 | -3 | 3 |
| England | 3 | 0 | 0 | 3 | 5 | 16 | -11 | 0 |

27 March 2013
| Turkey | 3–5 | Slovenia |
| Ukraine | 7–0 | England |
28 March 2013
| Turkey | 4–3 | England |
| Slovenia | 8–3 | Ukraine |
30 March 2013
| England | 2–5 | Slovenia |
| Ukraine | 4–2 | Turkey |

=== Ranking of third-placed teams ===
The best third-place team qualified for the play-off.

| Grp | Team | Pld | W | D | L | GF | GA | GD | Pts |
|---|---|---|---|---|---|---|---|---|---|
| 2 | Slovakia | 3 | 1 | 1 | 1 | 9 | 9 | 0 | 4 |
| 3 | Kazakhstan | 3 | 1 | 1 | 1 | 4 | 6 | –2 | 4 |
| 7 | Turkey | 3 | 1 | 0 | 2 | 9 | 12 | –3 | 3 |
| 4 | North Macedonia | 3 | 1 | 0 | 2 | 7 | 10 | –3 | 3 |
| 1 | Finland | 3 | 1 | 0 | 2 | 6 | 11 | –5 | 3 |
| 6 | Georgia | 3 | 1 | 0 | 2 | 9 | 15 | –6 | 3 |
| 5 | Greece | 3 | 1 | 0 | 2 | 5 | 14 | –9 | 3 |

== Play-off round ==
The eight teams were drawn into four pairs to play two-legged ties on 17–18 and 24 September 2013. The four winners complete the final tournament lineup. The draw for the playoffs took place in Nyon on 3 July 2013.

| Team 1 | Agg. | Team 2 | 1st leg | 2nd leg |
|---|---|---|---|---|
| Ukraine | 6–6 (a) | Hungary | 2–1 | 4–5 |
| Romania | 9–3 | Serbia | 2–1 | 7–2 |
| Bosnia and Herzegovina | 4–4 (a) | Netherlands | 3–2 | 1–2 |
| Slovakia | 1–7 | Croatia | 1–3 | 0–4 |

== Qualified teams ==
- Azerbaijan
- Belgium (hosts)
- Croatia
- Czech Republic
- Italy
- Netherlands
- Portugal
- Romania
- Russia
- Slovenia
- Spain
- Ukraine
