= Omar Fonstad el Ghaouti =

Norwegian footballer (born 1990)

Personal information
- Date of birth: 15 February 1990 (age 36)
- Height: 1.81 m (5 ft 11 in)
- Position: Forward

Team information
- Current team: Råde
- Number: 11

Youth career
- Vestli
- Stabæk

Senior career*
Years	Team	Apps	(Gls)
2009	Oslo City		
2010	Grorud		
2011	Lørenskog		
2012	Nordstrand		
2012–2013	Sliema Wanderers		
2013	Żejtun Corinthians		
2013	Ull/Kisa	0	(0)
2014	Oppsal	23	(34)
2015–2016	Moss	40	(21)
2016	Lørenskog	11	(6)
2017	Fram	26	(19)
2018–2019	Bryne	50	(21)
2020	Arendal	18	(5)
2021	Alta	26	(4)
2022–2024	Hønefoss	49	(39)
2024–	Råde	9	(4)

International career^{‡}
2014–2015	Norway futsal	17	(1)
- * Club domestic league appearances and goals as of 20:25, 9 March 2025 (UTC) ‡ National team caps and goals as of 25 January 2022

Omar Fonstad el Ghaouti (born 15 February 1990) is a Norwegian futsal player and football striker who plays for Råde.

Hailing from Stovner in Oslo, he is of Norwegian and Moroccan descent. After playing for Stabæk U20 he played for four clubs in and around Oslo before making his way to Malta in 2012. A journeyman footballer, he also won 17 caps for the Norwegian national futsal team in 2014 and 2015.
