= Andorra national futsal team =

Andorra
- Nickname(s): Tricolors (The Tricolours)
- Association: Andorran Football Federation
- Confederation: UEFA (Europe)
- Head coach: Neftalí Puyalto
- FIFA code: AND
- FIFA ranking: 51 ▲5 (8 May 2026)
Home colours	Away colours

First international
- Andorra 0–4 Portugal (Andorra; March 3, 1998)

Biggest win
- Andorra 10–0 Scotland (Hjørring, Denmark; April 8, 2026)

Biggest defeat
- Andorra 1–13 Hungary (Andorra la Vella, Andorra; May 20, 2003)

FIFA World Cup
- Appearances: 0

UEFA Futsal Championship
- Appearances: 0

The Andorra national futsal team is controlled by the Andorran Football Federation, the governing body for futsal in Andorra and represents the country in international futsal competitions, such as the World Cup and the European Championships.

== Competition history ==
=== FIFA Futsal World Cup ===
FIFA Futsal World Cup record									Qualification record						
Year	Round	Pld	W	D	L	GF	GA	Squad	Outcome	Pld	W	D	L	GF	GA
(Netherlands) 1989	Did not enter								Did not enter						
(Hong Kong) 1992	Did not enter								Did not enter						
(Spain) 1996	Did not enter								Did not enter						
(Guatemala) 2000	Did not qualify								Group A 5th place	5	1	0	4	11	21
(Taiwan) 2004	Did not qualify								Group 4 3rd place	2	0	0	2	2	10
(Brazil) 2008	Did not qualify								Group 8 4th place	3	0	0	3	7	17
(Thailand) 2012	Did not qualify								Group B 4th place	3	0	0	3	8	18
(Colombia) 2016	Did not qualify								Group A 3rd place	3	1	0	2	5	12
(Lithuania) 2021	Did not qualify								Group B 4th place	3	0	0	3	6	15
(Uzbekistan) 2024	Did not qualify								Group E 4th place	3	1	0	2	9	10
Total	0/10	0	0	0	0	0	0	—	7/10	22	3	0	19	48	103

=== UEFA Futsal Euro ===
UEFA Futsal Euro record									Qualification record						
Year	Round	Pld	W	D	L	GF	GA	Squad	Outcome	Pld	W	D	L	GF	GA
(Spain) 1996	Did not enter								Did not enter						
(Spain) 1999	Did not qualify								Group E 3rd place	3	1	1	1	10	9
(Russia) 2001	Did not qualify								Group B Runners-up	3	2	0	1	10	8
(Italy) 2003	Did not qualify								Group G 3rd place	3	1	0	2	6	13
(Czech Republic) 2005	Did not qualify								Group C 3rd place	3	1	0	2	7	21
(Portugal) 2007	Did not qualify								Group B 4th place	3	0	0	3	7	19
(Hungary) 2010	Did not qualify								Group 1 4th place	3	0	1	2	6	14
(Croatia) 2012	Did not qualify								Group F Runners-up	3	2	0	1	9	9
(Belgium) 2014	Did not qualify								Group E 3rd place	3	1	1	1	8	9
(Serbia) 2016	Did not qualify								Group E 3rd place	3	1	0	2	8	6
(Slovenia) 2018	Did not qualify								Group F 3rd place	2	0	0	2	1	10
(Netherlands) 2022	Did not qualify								Group D 4th place	3	1	0	2	2	4
(Latvia) (Lithuania) (Slovenia) 2026	Did not qualify								Group 7 3rd place	9	3	4	2	18	25
Total	0/13	0	0	0	0	0	0	—	12/13	41	13	7	21	92	147

== Players ==
=== Current squad ===
The following players were called up to the squad for the 2028 FIFA Futsal World Cup qualifying matches against Scotland, Malta and Denmark on 8, 9 and 11 April 2026 respectively.

No.	Pos.	Player	Date of birth (age)	Caps	Goals	Club
1	GK	Aitor Rubio (captain)	12 September 1986 (age 39)			(Andorran Football Federation) FC Encamp
13	GK	Xavier López	22 August 1994 (age 31)			(Andorran Football Federation) FC Rànger's
15	GK	Maxim Pons	23 April 2002 (age 24)			(Royal Spanish Football Federation) CCR BaixSud
3	DF	Èric Mesquita	8 November 1996 (age 29)			(Royal Spanish Football Federation) C.D Otxartabe
4	DF	Francisco Domínguez	4 August 1998 (age 28)			(Andorran Football Federation) ENFAF CM Andorra
6	DF	Oriol Rodríguez	4 November 1998 (age 27)			(Andorran Football Federation) ENFAF CM Andorra
22	DF	Roc Torres	13 January 2004 (age 22)			(Royal Spanish Football Federation) AE Les Corts UBAE
5	FW	Oscar San Segundo	19 November 1996 (age 29)			(Andorran Football Federation) ENFAF CM Andorra
7	FW	Josep Segura	30 November 2001 (age 24)			(Royal Spanish Football Federation) ADC Lugo Sala
8	FW	Claudi Bové	8 March 1996 (age 30)			(Andorran Football Federation) FC Rànger's
10	FW	Arnau Rodríguez	20 November 1995 (age 30)			(Andorran Football Federation) ENFAF CM Andorra
11	FW	Adrià Blat	19 October 2002 (age 23)			(Royal Spanish Football Federation) CD El Ejido Futsal
17	FW	Christian Regalo	8 March 1999 (age 27)			(Andorran Football Federation) ENFAF CM Andorra
23	FW	Brayan Pinto	12 September 1996 (age 29)			(Andorran Football Federation) ENFAF CM Andorra

=== Recent call-ups ===
The following players have also been called up to the squad within the last 12 months.

Pos.	Player	Date of birth (age)	Caps	Goals	Club	Latest call-up
DF	Omar Ávila	2 April 1993 (age 33)			ENFAF CM Andorra	v. Germany, 21 December 2025
FW	Pol Villalta^{INJ}	23 March 2004 (age 22)			(Spain) CFS Eixample	v. Germany, 21 December 2025
^{INJ} Player withdrew from the squad due to an injury.^{PRE} Preliminary squad.^{RET} Retired from international futsal.
