= Raoni Medina =

English former futsal player

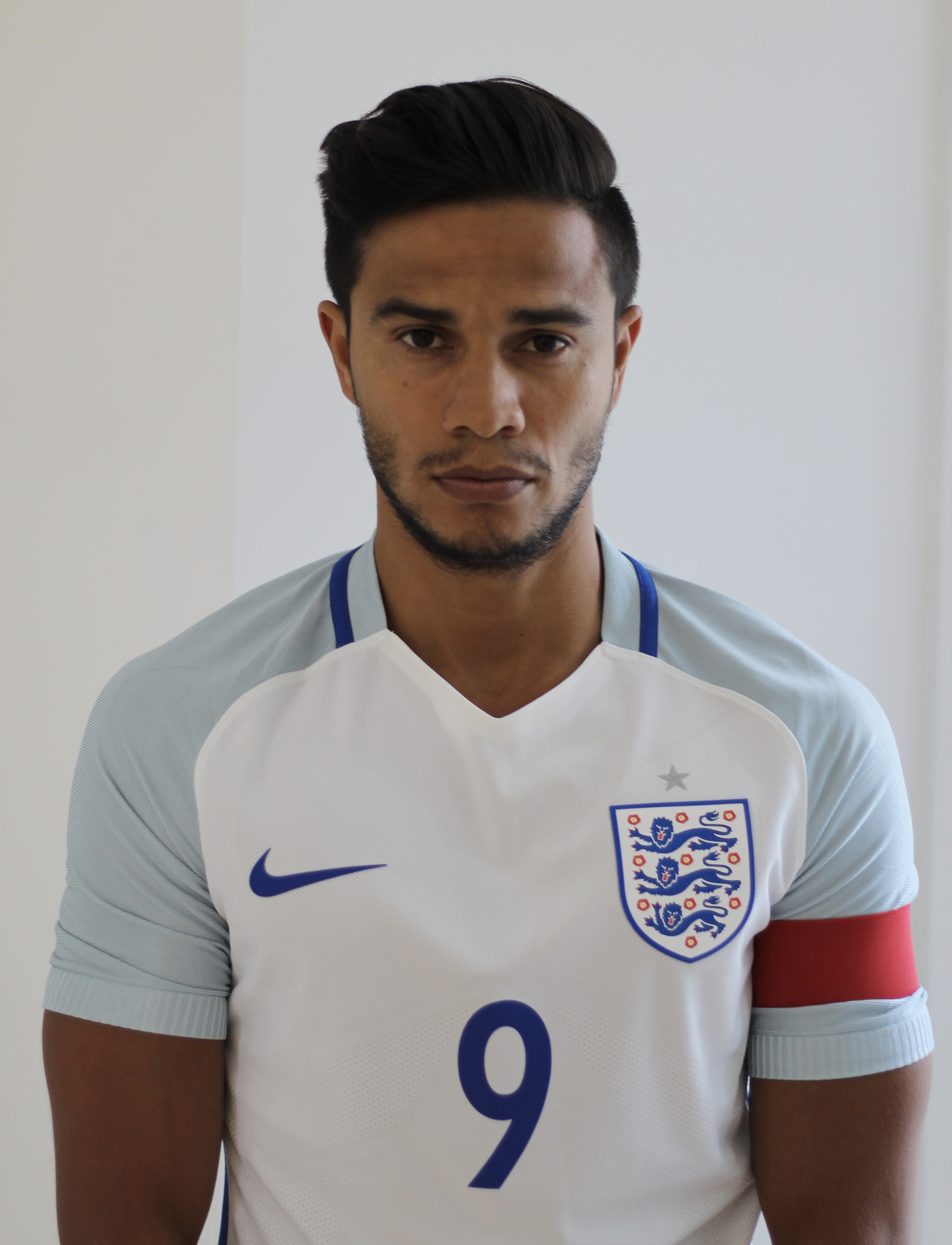
- Medina representing the England national futsal team as captain

Raoni Medina (born 27 May 1981) is a Brazilian-born football and futsal player, football educator, coach and speaker. He represented the England national futsal team after becoming a British citizen and later served as its captain.

== Early life ==
Medina was born in Londrina, Paraná, Brazil. At the age of 19, he moved to Portugal, where he joined the youth system of Sporting Clube de Portugal.

During his time at Sporting, he trained alongside Cristiano Ronaldo.

== Club career ==
After leaving Portugal, Medina moved to the United Kingdom, where he transitioned into futsal. He played for clubs including Helvécia Futsal Club.

He captained Helvécia to multiple domestic titles, becoming one of the most successful players in the history of English futsal. He won his ninth FA National Futsal League title in 2021.

== International career ==
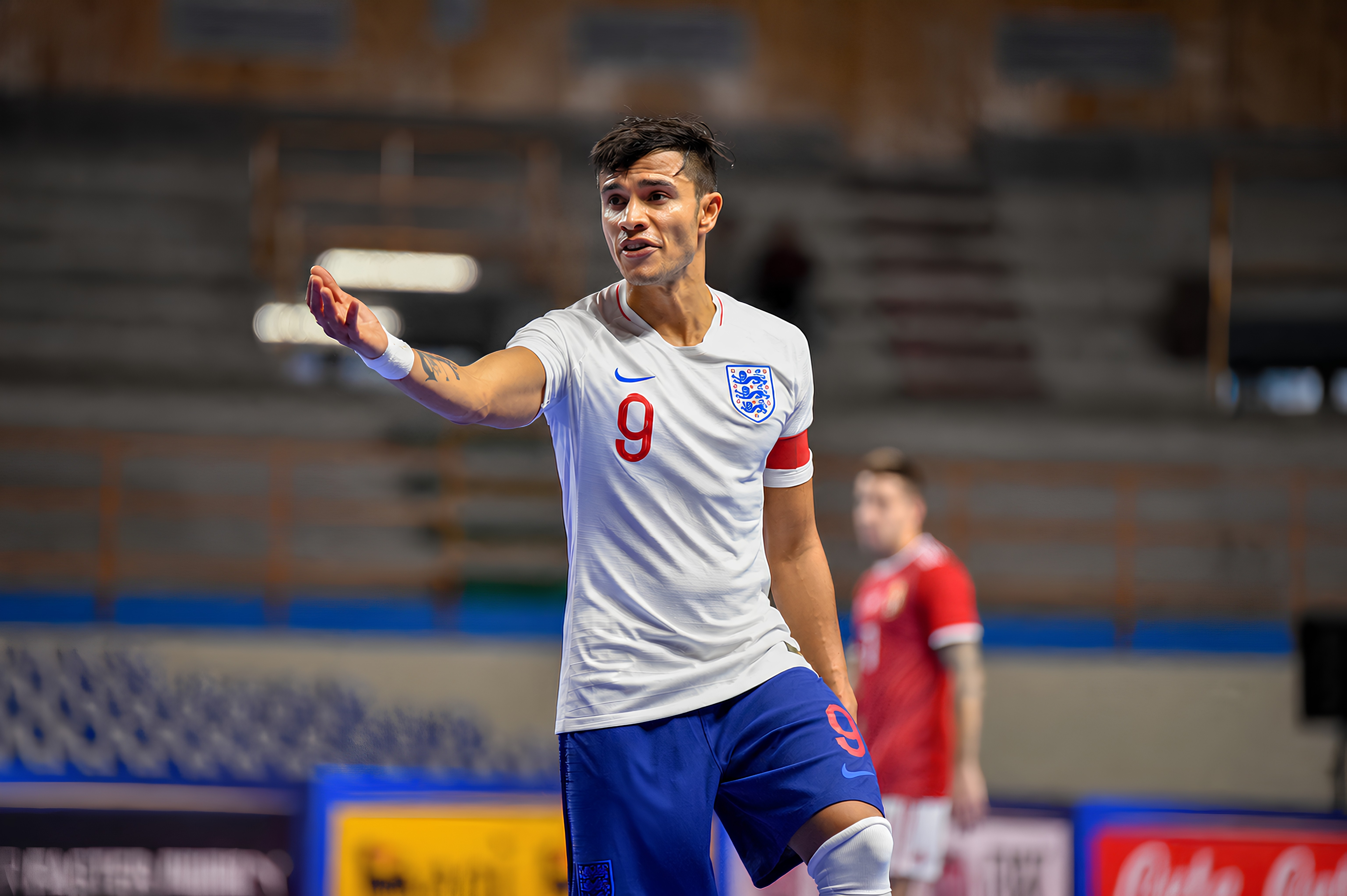
Medina captaining England during the FIFA Futsal World Cup qualifiers in Italy.

Medina became eligible to represent England after acquiring British citizenship in 2015. He made his debut for the England national futsal team that same year.

He was later appointed captain of the team and featured in international fixtures.

== Post-playing career ==
After his playing career, Medina moved into coaching and football education. In 2021, he joined the UEFA Executive Master for International Players programme.

His graduate profile on the UEFA MIP website lists him as a Player Development Specialist with ModernPlay Football Consultancy.

In 2026, UEFA reported that Medina delivered a futsal development seminar for coaches in Moldova.
