= Bosnia and Herzegovina national futsal team =

Bosnia and Herzegovina
- Nickname(s): Zlatni ljiljani (Golden Lilies); Zmajevi (Dragons)
- Association: Football Association of Bosnia and Herzegovina
- Confederation: UEFA (Europe)
- Head coach: Goran Melher
- Asst coach: Mirsad Fazlinović Perica Trifković
- Captain: Mirko Hrkać
- Most caps: Alen Lalić
- Top scorer: Alen Lalić
- Home stadium: Zetra Olympic Hall (capacity: 12,000)
- FIFA code: BIH
- FIFA ranking: 47 ▼1 (24 September 2026)
Home colours	Away colours

First international
- Hungary 1–4 Bosnia and Herzegovina (Kaposvár, Hungary; August 26, 1998)

Biggest win
- Bosnia and Herzegovina 17–1 Northern Ireland (Zenica, ZDC; October 15, 2026)

Biggest defeat
- Italy 8–0 Bosnia and Herzegovina (Caserta, Italy; October 29, 2000); Spain 9–1 Bosnia and Herzegovina (Toledo, Spain; April 1, 2008)

UEFA Futsal Championship
- Appearances: 1 (First in 2022)
- Best result: Group stage (2022)

The Bosnia and Herzegovina national futsal team is controlled by the Football Association of Bosnia and Herzegovina, the governing body for futsal in Bosnia and Herzegovina and represents the country in international futsal competitions, such as the FIFA Futsal World Cup and the European Championships.

== Tournament records ==
=== FIFA Futsal World Cup ===
FIFA Futsal World Cup record								Qualification record						
Year	Round	Pld	W	D	L	GF	GA	Outcome	Pld	W	D	L	GF	GA
(Netherlands) 1989	Part of Yugoslavia							-	-	-	-	-	-	-
(Hong Kong) 1992	Part of Yugoslavia							-	-	-	-	-	-	-
(Spain) 1996	Part of Yugoslavia							-	-	-	-	-	-	-
(Guatemala) 2000	Did not qualify							Group A 3rd place	5	2	2	1	11	10
(Chinese Taipei) 2004	Did not qualify							Play-offs	4	2	1	1	14	13
(Brazil) 2008	Did not qualify							Play-offs	5	2	1	2	19	17
(Thailand) 2012	Did not qualify							Group 1 3rd place	3	1	0	2	3	9
(Colombia) 2016	Did not qualify							Group 4 3rd place	3	1	0	2	9	14
(Lithuania) 2021	Did not qualify							Group 7 3rd place	6	4	0	2	32	15
(Uzbekistan) 2024	Did not qualify							Group 3 3rd place	4	0	0	4	8	16
Total	0/10	0	0	0	0	0	0	7/10	30	12	4	14	96	94

=== UEFA European Futsal Championship ===
UEFA Futsal Euro record								Qualification record						
Year	Round	Pld	W	D	L	GF	GA	Outcome	Pld	W	D	L	GF	GA
(Spain) 1996	Part of Yugoslavia							-	-	-	-	-	-	-
(Spain) 1999	Did not qualify							Group G 3rd place	3	1	0	2	6	10
(Russia) 2001	Did not qualify							Group F 3rd place	2	0	0	2	2	12
(Italy) 2003	Did not qualify							Group F 3rd place	3	0	1	2	8	13
(Czech Republic) 2005	Did not qualify							Group G runner up	3	2	0	1	14	11
(Portugal) 2007	Did not qualify							Group E 4th place	3	0	0	3	9	16
(Hungary) 2010	Did not qualify							Group 3 4th place	3	0	1	2	6	9
(Croatia) 2012	Did not qualify							Group 6 3rd place	3	1	0	2	4	11
(Belgium) 2014	Did not qualify							Play-offs	5	2	1	2	14	11
(Serbia) 2016	Did not qualify							Play-offs	5	2	0	3	10	15
(Slovenia) 2018	Did not qualify							Group 2 3rd place	3	0	2	1	12	13
(Netherlands) 2022	Group Stage	3	0	0	3	4	11	Group 4 winners	9	8	0	1	40	20
(Latvia) (Lithuania) 2026	Did not qualify							Play-offs	8	4	0	4	32	40
Total	1/13	3	0	0	3	4	11	12/12	50	20	5	25	157	181

=== Mediterranean Futsal Cup ===
Mediterranean Futsal Cup Record
Year	Round	Position	Pld	W	D	L	GF	GA	GD
(Libya) 2010	Quarter finals	7th	6	3	0	3	26	22	+4
Total	1/1	—	6	3	0	3	26	22	+4

== Current squad ==
The following players were called up to the squad for the UEFA Futsal Euro 2022 qualifying. All players played at least one of the six matches against Serbia, Romania and North Macedonia.

No.	Pos.	Player	Date of birth (age)	Caps	Club
1	GK	Darko Milanović	15 October 1991 (aged 29)		(Bosnia and Herzegovina) FC Salines
12	GK	Stanislav Galić	26 September 1986 (aged 34)		(Bosnia and Herzegovina) FC Mostar SG
20	GK	Andrijano Dujmović	12 October 1988 (aged 32)		(Bosnia and Herzegovina) MNK Hercegovina
2	DF	Marin Sesar	8 September 1997 (aged 23)		(Croatia) MNK Novo Vrijeme
4	DF	Marijo Aladžić	30 June 1994 (aged 26)		(Bosnia and Herzegovina) FC Mostar SG
5	DF	Davor Arnautović	3 September 1991 (aged 29)		(Bosnia and Herzegovina) FC Salines
13	DF	Ibrahim Hršumović			(Bosnia and Herzegovina) GFC Sarajevo
15	DF	Emir Omerhodžić			(Bosnia and Herzegovina) GFC Sarajevo
16	DF	Amel Handžić	23 January 1991 (aged 30)		(Bosnia and Herzegovina) GFC Sarajevo
17	DF	Kristijan Pantić			(Bosnia and Herzegovina) MNK Brotnjo
18	DF	Ivan Ivanković	23 April 1993 (aged 27)		(Germany) TSV Weilimdorf
3	FW	Josip Sesar	16 October 1992 (aged 28)		(Germany) Stuttgarter Futsal Club
6	FW	Srđan Ivanković	25 January 1994 (aged 27)		(Germany) Stuttgarter Futsal Club
7	FW	Bilal Jelić	1 September 1994 (aged 26)		(Bosnia and Herzegovina) FC Mostar SG
8	FW	Mirko Hrkać	7 July 1991 (aged 29)		(Italy) CMB Matera
9	FW	Nermin Kahvedžić	5 November 1987 (aged 33)		(Bosnia and Herzegovina) FC Mostar SG
10	FW	Anel Radmilović (captain)	29 August 1988 (aged 32)		(Bosnia and Herzegovina) FC Mostar SG
11	FW	Josip Bošković			(Croatia) HMNK Vrgorac
14	FW	Sabahudin Petak			(Bosnia and Herzegovina) MNK Sloga
19	FW	Samir Gosto			(Bosnia and Herzegovina) FC Mostar SG
24	FW	Adnan Kalajdžić			(Bosnia and Herzegovina) FC Mostar SG

== Coaching history ==
- (Bosnia and Herzegovina) Rade Kovač
- (Bosnia and Herzegovina) Tomislav Ćurčić (2008–2011)
- (Bosnia and Herzegovina) Murat Jaha (2011–2013)
- (Bosnia and Herzegovina) Boro Matan (2013–2018)
- (Bosnia and Herzegovina) Ivo Krezo (2018–present)
