= Greece national futsal team =

Greece
- Shirt badge/Association crest
- Nickname(s): Ethniki (National); Galanolefki (Sky blue-white); Piratiko (Pirate Ship)
- Association: Hellenic Football Federation
- Confederation: UEFA (Europe)
- Head coach: Leonidas Papadopoulos
- FIFA code: GRE
- FIFA ranking: 112 ▼18 (8 May 2026)
Home colours	Away colours

First international
- Russia 24–0 Greece (Moscow, Russia; 18 December 1998)

Biggest win
- Albania 4–13 Greece (Braga, Portugal; 7 November 2003)

Biggest defeat
- Russia 24–0 Greece (Moscow, Russia; 18 December 1998)

FIFA World Cup
- Appearances: 0

UEFA Futsal Championship
- Appearances: 0

The Greece national futsal team is controlled by the Hellenic Football Federation, the governing body for futsal in Greece and represents the country in international futsal competitions, such as the World Cup and the European Championships. The greatest achievement of the Greece national futsal team is the qualification to the second preliminary round of the European Championships of 2014. The coach of the team is Stefanos Soilemes since 2008. The players are chosen from the Greek Futsal Super League, the Futsal Championship of Greece. The last years there is a player, Konstantinos Panou who plays in Spain. As the team is in position number 81 of the Futsal World Ranking has to pass through both the first and the second preliminary round in order to play to a competition like World Cup or Euro.

== Coach ==
Coach of the team is Stefanos Soilemes since 2008. He is also the coach of the U21 Greece national futsal team. Stefanos Soilemes was born in Germany and came to Greece in 1992. He was a futsal player from 1997 to 2007, playing in teams like Iniochos and Keratsini and from 2000 he was a member of the Greece national futsal team. In 2007 he was the assistant coach of Sergey Stulov in the team and he took over the team in 2008. From 2012 until today he is also the coach of the Beach Soccer national Greek team.

== Competition history ==
The Greece national futsal team remains unqualified for a major competition. The biggest achievement is the qualification to the second preliminary round of the European Championships of 2014. In this round the team defeated Poland and lost to Portugal and Serbia.

== UEFA Futsal Euro 2018 ==
The team trained for the first qualifying round of the Futsal Euro 2018. Greece played against Wales, Moldova and San Marino. The matches took place in Wales in the end of January 2017. The first of this group played against Spain, Serbia and Poland in a group that took place in Poland in March or April 2017. As a part of this preparation Greece national futsal team played against Bulgaria and Turkey in Chalkida in a tournament that took place in Chalkida, Greece in November 2016.

== Players ==
=== Current squad ===
The following players were called up to the squad for the 2028 FIFA Futsal World Cup qualifying matches against Israel, Norway and Estonia on 11, 12 and 14 April 2026 respectively.

No.	Pos.	Player	Date of birth (age)	Caps	Goals	Club
1	GK	Nikolaos Aronis	12 May 1997 (age 29)			(Hellenic Football Federation) AEK Futsal
12	GK	Konstantinos Moirotsos	9 February 1997 (age 29)			(Hellenic Football Federation) Korydallos Futsal
15	GK	Efthimios Michalitsis	10 November 1999 (age 26)			(Hellenic Football Federation) AEK Futsal
3	DF	Konstantinos Papadopoulos	28 September 2004 (age 21)			(Hellenic Football Federation) Doukas
4	DF	Gerasimos Tselios	9 January 2005 (age 21)			(Hellenic Football Federation) Ermis Zografou
8	DF	Panagiotis Gousis	16 November 2000 (age 25)			(Hellenic Football Federation) AEK Futsal
2	FW	Ioannis Zormpas	27 January 2005 (age 21)			(Hellenic Football Federation) Ermis Zografou
5	FW	Dimitrios Karydas	25 January 2000 (age 26)			(Hellenic Football Federation) Doukas
6	FW	Vasilis Tzakidis	30 November 1999 (age 26)			(Cyprus Football Association) APOEL Futsal
7	FW	Marios Ntatis	20 December 1994 (age 31)			(Hellenic Football Federation) AEK Futsal
9	FW	Alexandros Adamopoulos	17 January 2004 (age 22)			(Italian Football Federation) CDM Futsal Genova
10	FW	Konstantinos Panou (captain)	13 October 1997 (age 28)			(Hellenic Football Federation) Doukas
11	FW	Panagiotis Paouris	16 December 1996 (age 29)			(Hellenic Football Federation) Athina 90
14	FW	Dimitrios Anastasopoulos	22 August 2005 (age 21)			(Hellenic Football Federation) AEK Futsal

=== Recent call-ups ===
The following players have also been called up to the squad within the last 12 months.

Pos.	Player	Date of birth (age)	Caps	Goals	Club	Latest call-up
GK	Vasileios Charalampopoulos	12 December 1995 (age 30)			(Greece) Doukas	v. Moldova, 11 February 2026
DF	Panagiotis Bechrakis				(Greece) A.O.T. Alimos Futsal	v. Moldova, 11 February 2026
DF	Konstantinos Stylianopoulos	21 June 2000 (age 26)			(Greece) Athina 90	v. Moldova, 11 February 2026
FW	Antonios Fanaras	6 April 2005 (age 21)			(Greece) A.O.T. Alimos Futsal	v. Moldova, 11 February 2026
FW	Ioannis Zompolas	15 May 2005 (age 21)			(Greece) Ermis Zografou	v. Moldova, 11 February 2026
FW	Kyriakos Kountardas				(Greece) Ermis Zografou	v. Moldova, 11 February 2026
FW	Antonios Kontogeorgis	9 December 2001 (age 24)			(Greece) G.S. Salamina	v. Moldova, 11 February 2026
^{INJ} Player withdrew from the squad due to an injury.^{PRE} Preliminary squad.^{RET} Retired from international futsal.
