= Wales national futsal team =

Wales
- Nickname(s): The Dragons
- Association: Football Association of Wales
- Confederation: UEFA (Europe)
- Head coach: Paul Douglas Jones & Gareth Wallwork
- Captain: Chris Hugh
- Most caps: Elliot Thomas (42)
- Top scorer: Chris Hugh
- FIFA code: WAL
- FIFA ranking: 90 ▲1 (24 September 2026)
- Highest FIFA ranking: 82 (19 October 2015)
- Lowest FIFA ranking: 96 (29 April 2016)
Home colours	Away colours

First international
- Andorra 2–1 Wales (Escaldes, Andorra; 2 September 2012)

Biggest win
- Wales 8–1 San Marino (Hereford, England; 27 January 2017)

Biggest defeat
- Poland 8–1 Wales (Zielona Góra, Poland; 4 January 2014)

FIFA World Cup
- Appearances: 0

UEFA Futsal Championship
- Appearances: 0

The Wales national futsal team is controlled by the Football Association of Wales, the governing body for futsal in Wales and represents the country in international futsal competitions, such as the Futsal World Cup and the European Championships.

The creation of the Wales futsal team was first announced in late 2011, an FAW Futsal squad was named for a one-day training camp and fixture in Cardiff on 18 December at Cardiff University, to begin the FAW's preparations for the UEFA Futsal Championship qualification in January 2013. A second training camp was held on 11 March 2012 and Wales played the England Development squad on 15 April. England won the game 8–6 in Deeside, Flintshire.

On 6 and 7 July, Wales played two friendlies against AC Omonia's futsal team, the current Cypriot champions. Wales played their first official international match against Andorra in September 2012 and took part in qualification for the first time in January 2013 in the UEFA Futsal Championship qualifiers.

== Current squad ==
The Proposed Inaugural FAW Futsal Squad. These players have all represented the Wales national futsal team.

#	Pos	Name	Caps	Club
	GK	Lee Jones		Cardiff Met Futsal Club
	GK	Dafydd Jones		Bristol City Futsal Club
	D	Rhys Williams		Cardiff University Futsal Club
	M	Chris Hugh (c)		Cardiff University Futsal Club
	M	Elliot Thomas		Cardiff University Futsal Club
	P	Josh Dorward		Cardiff University Futsal Club
	M	Naim Arsan		Cheshire Futsal Club
	P	Rico Zulkarnain		Orlando SeaWolves
	M	Connor Rogers		Cheshire Futsal Club
	M	Warren Hudson		Llandarcy Futsal Club
	P	Tyrell Webbe		Carmarthen Town F.C.
	M	Dean Maynard		Cardiff University Futsal Club
	M	Jonathan Nelson		Cardiff University Futsal Club
	M	Adam Orme		Llandarcy Futsal Club
	GK	Matthew Morris		Cardiff University Futsal Club
	M	Craig Pritchard		Cheshire Futsal Club
	M	Gareth Delve		Cardiff University Futsal Club
	M	Chris Bright		Worcester Futsal Club

== Tournament records ==
=== FIFA Futsal World Cup ===
FIFA World Cup Record
Year	Round	Pld	W	D	L	GS	GA
Netherlands 1989	Did not enter	-	-	-	-	-	-
Hong Kong 1992	Did not enter	-	-	-	-	-	-
Spain 1996	Did not enter	-	-	-	-	-	-
Guatemala 2000	Did not enter	-	-	-	-	-	-
Taiwan 2004	Did not enter	-	-	-	-	-	-
Brazil 2008	Did not enter	-	-	-	-	-	-
Thailand 2012	Did not enter	-	-	-	-	-	-
Colombia 2016	Did not qualify	-	-	-	-	-	-
Lithuania 2021	Did not qualify	-	-	-	-	-	-
Uzbekistan 2024	Did not enter	-	-	-	-	-	-
Total	0/10	-	-	-	-	-	-

=== UEFA Futsal Championship ===
UEFA European Futsal Championship Record
Year	Round	Pld	W	D	L	GS	GA
Spain 1996	Did not enter	-	-	-	-	-	-
Spain 1999	Did not enter	-	-	-	-	-	-
Russia 2001	Did not enter	-	-	-	-	-	-
Italy 2003	Did not enter	-	-	-	-	-	-
Czech Republic 2005	Did not enter	-	-	-	-	-	-
Portugal 2007	Did not enter	-	-	-	-	-	-
Hungary 2010	Did not enter	-	-	-	-	-	-
Croatia 2012	Did not enter	-	-	-	-	-	-
Belgium 2014	Did not qualify	-	-	-	-	-	-
Serbia 2016	Did not qualify	-	-	-	-	-	-
Slovenia 2018	Did not qualify	-	-	-	-	-	-
Netherlands 2022	Did not qualify	-	-	-	-	-	-
Latvia/Lithuania/Slovenia 2026	Did not enter	-	-	-	-	-	-
Total	0/13	-	-	-	-	-	-
