= Northern Ireland national futsal team =

Northern Ireland
- Nickname(s): Green and White Army
- Association: None
- Confederation: UEFA (Europe)
- Head coach: (Spain) Enrique Guillén
- Captain: Adam Barr
- Most caps: Adam Barr (31)
- Top scorer: Connor Millar (19)
- Home stadium: Newry Leisure Centre
- FIFA code: NIR
- FIFA ranking: 117 (24 September 2026)
Home colours	Away colours

First international
- Wales 7–1 Northern Ireland (Cardiff, Wales; 2 December 2016)

Biggest win
- Northern Ireland 8–1 Gibraltar (Newry, Northern Ireland; 10 January 2020)

Biggest defeat
- Bosnia and Herzegovina 17–1 Northern Ireland (Zenica, Bosnia and Herzegovina; 15 October 2026)

FIFA World Cup
- Appearances: 0

Home Nations Championship
- Appearances: 12
- Best result: Scotland 3–5 Northern Ireland (Burton-on-Trent, England; 1st December 2019)

The Northern Ireland national futsal team represents Northern Ireland during international futsal competitions such as the FIFA Futsal World Cup and the UEFA Futsal Euro.

Home matches are played at Newry Leisure Centre. Northern Ireland entered qualification for the FIFA Futsal World Cup for the first time in 2019 and qualification for the UEFA Futsal Euro for the first time in 2020. The team have yet to advance from a qualification tournament.

== Competitive record ==
=== FIFA Futsal World Cup ===
FIFA Futsal World Cup record								Qualification record						
Year	Round	Pld	W	D	L	GF	GA	Outcome	Pld	W	D	L	GF	GA
(Netherlands) 1989	Did not enter							Did not enter						
(Hong Kong) 1992	Did not enter							Did not enter						
(Spain) 1996	Did not enter							Did not enter						
(Guatemala) 2000	Did not enter							Did not enter						
(Taiwan) 2004	Did not enter							Did not enter						
(Brazil) 2008	Did not enter							Did not enter						
(Thailand) 2012	Did not enter							Did not enter						
(Colombia) 2016	Did not enter							Did not enter						
(Lithuania) 2021	Did not qualify							Group H 4th place	3	0	0	3	6	25
(Uzbekistan) 2024	Did not qualify							Group D 4th place	3	0	1	2	7	12
Total	0/10	0	0	0	0	0	0	2/10	6	0	1	5	13	37

=== UEFA Futsal Championship ===
UEFA Futsal Euro record								Qualification record						
Year	Round	Pld	W	D	L	GF	GA	Outcome	Pld	W	D	L	GF	GA
(Spain) 1996	Did not enter							Did not enter						
(Spain) 1999	Did not enter							Did not enter						
(Russia) 2001	Did not enter							Did not enter						
(Italy) 2003	Did not enter							Did not enter						
(Czech Republic) 2005	Did not enter							Did not enter						
(Portugal) 2007	Did not enter							Did not enter						
(Hungary) 2010	Did not enter							Did not enter						
(Croatia) 2012	Did not enter							Did not enter						
(Belgium) 2014	Did not enter							Did not enter						
(Serbia) 2016	Did not enter							Did not enter						
(Slovenia) 2018	Did not enter							Did not enter						
(Netherlands) 2022	Did not qualify							Group E 4th place	3	0	0	3	5	16
(Latvia) (Lithuania) (Slovenia) 2026	Did not qualify							Group A 4th place	3	0	0	3	5	8
Total	0/13	0	0	0	0	0	0	2/13	6	0	0	6	10	24

=== Home Nations Championship ===
Home Nations Championship Record
Year	Pld	W	D	L	GS	GA	GD
Wales 2016	3	0	0	3	4	31	-27
Scotland 2017	3	0	0	3	2	17	-15
Northern Ireland 2018	3	1	0	2	7	7	0
England 2019	3	1	0	2	12	18	-6
Total	12	2	0	10	25	73	-48

== Players ==
=== Current squad ===
The following players were called up to the squad for the 2028 FIFA Futsal World Cup qualifying matches against Sweden, England and Switzerland on 7, 8 and 10 April 2026 respectively.

No.	Pos.	Player	Date of birth (age)	Caps	Goals	Club
1	GK	Matthew McErlain	4 May 1995 (age 31)			(Irish Football Association) Sparta Belfast
19	GK	Zach Tolmie	6 March 1999 (age 27)			(Irish Football Association) Dundela Futsal
4	DF	Adam Barr (captain)	14 February 1992 (age 34)			(The Football Association) Bolton Futsal Club
7	DF	Conor Kernohan	28 August 1998 (age 28)			(The Football Association) Bolton Futsal Club
11	DF	Darius Roohi	25 September 1998 (age 28)			(Irish Football Association) Sparta Belfast
3	FW	Caolan Dobney	24 December 2003 (age 22)			(The Football Association) Bolton Futsal Club
5	FW	Danny Stapleton	13 February 1997 (age 29)			(The Football Association) Manchester Futsal Club
6	FW	Ryan McMenemy	20 September 2002 (age 24)			(Irish Football Association) Sparta Belfast
10	FW	Connor Millar	12 September 1991 (age 35)			(The Football Association) Bolton Futsal Club
12	FW	Declan Starrs	8 November 2004 (age 22)			(The Football Association) Bloomsbury Futsal Club
14	FW	Josh Lowry	22 February 1993 (age 33)			(Irish Football Association) Sparta Belfast
15	FW	Nathan Best	16 March 2000 (age 26)			(Irish Football Association) Sparta Belfast
16	FW	Kenzie Beattie	16 June 2007 (age 19)			(Irish Football Association) Dundela Futsal
17	FW	Lee McMenemy	2 August 2004 (age 22)			(Irish Football Association) Coagh United

== Northern Ireland Futsal Matches ==
Opponent	H / A	Date	Competition	Score	Result	Scorers	Venue
Wales	Away	02-12-2016	Home Nations Championship	7–1	Loss	Michael O’Hehir	House of Sport, Cardiff, Wales
England	Away	03-12-2016	Home Nations Championship	16–1	Loss	Conor Glenholmes	House of Sport, Cardiff, Wales
Scotland	Away	04-12-2016	Home Nations Championship	8–2	Loss	Conor Glenholmes, Chris Donnelly	House of Sport, Cardiff, Wales
San Marino	Away	13-05-2017	Friendly International	2–1	Loss	Conor Glenholmes	Multieventi Sport Domus Ore, San Marino
San Marino	Away	14-05-2017	Friendly International	0–1	Win	Ciaran Donaghy	Multieventi Sport Domus Ore, San Marino
Gibraltar	Away	24-11-2017	Friendly International	6–5	Loss	Jack Magee, Connor Millar x 2, Conor Glenholmes x 2	Tercentenary Sportshall, Gibraltar
Gibraltar	Away	25-11-2017	Friendly International	3–1	Loss	Craig Taylor	Tercentenary Sportshall, Gibraltar
Scotland	Away	01-12-2017	Home Nations Championship	4–1	Loss	Conor Glenholmes	Oriam, Edinburgh, Scotland
England	Away	02-12-2017	Home Nations Championship	5-1	Loss	Jordan Wilson	Oriam, Edinburgh, Scotland
Wales	Away	03-12-2017	Home Nations Championship	8-0	Loss	N/A	Oriam, Edinburgh, Scotland
Scotland	Home	22-06-2018	Friendly International	6–8	Loss	Jack Magee, Adam Barr, Conor Glenholmes, Craig Taylor, Connor Millar, Danny Stapleton	Newry Leisure Centre, Newry, Northern Ireland
Scotland	Home	23-06-2018	Friendly International	6–6	Draw	Jack Magee x 2, Brendan Shannon, Connor Millar x 2, Craig Taylor	Newry Leisure Centre, Newry, Northern Ireland
Malta	Away	26-10-2018	Friendly International	1–2	Win	Adam Barr, Craig Taylor	Malta
Malta	Away	27-10-2018	Friendly International	4–1	Loss	Ciaran Donaghy	Malta
Scotland	Home	30-11-2018	Home Nations Championship	2–6	Loss	Connor Millar, Jack Magee	Newry Leisure Centre, Nerwy, Northern Ireland
Wales	Home	01-12-2018	Home Nations Championship	2–0	Win	Darius Roohi, Jack Magee	Newry Leisure Centre, Nerwy, Northern Ireland
England	Home	02-12-2018	Home Nations Championship	1–3	Loss	Conor Glenholmes	Newry Leisure Centre, Nerwy, Northern Ireland
Malta	Home	18-01-2019	Friendly International	4–2	Win	Craig Taylor, James Gould, Connor Millar x 2	Newry Leisure Centre, Newry, Northern Ireland
Malta	Home	19-01-2019	Friendly International	1–3	Loss	Connor Millar	Newry Leisure Centre, Newry, Northern Ireland
Finland	Away	30-01-2019	FIFA 2020 World Cup Prelim Rd	9–1	Loss	Connor Millar	FMF Futsal Arena, Ciorescu, Moldova
Moldova	Away	31-01-2019	FIFA 2020 World Cup Prelim Rd	13–3	Loss	Scott Gunn, Connor Millar x 2	FMF Futsal Arena, Ciorescu, Moldova
Wales	Away	02-02-2019	FIFA 2020 World Cup Prelim Rd	3–2	Loss	Conor Glenholmes, John Gibson	FMF Futsal Arena, Ciorescu, Moldova
Wales	Away	29-11-2019	Home Nations Championship	9-3	Loss	Adam Barr, Scott Gunn, Connor Millar	St Georges Park, Burton on Trent, England
England	Away	30-11-2019	Home Nations Championship	6-4	Loss	Ryan Dabbs, Craig Taylor x 2, Connor Millar	St Georges Park, Burton on Trent, England
Scotland	Away	01-12-2019	Home Nations Championship	3-5	Win	Craig Taylor, Adam Barr, Josh Lowry x 2, Ryan Dabbs	St Georges Park, Burton on Trent, England
Gibraltar	Home	10-01-2020	Friendly International	8–1	Win	Conor Glenholmes x 3, Scott Gunn x 2, Craig Taylor, Adam Barr, Ryan Dabbs	Newry Leisure Centre, Newry, Northern Ireland
Gibraltar	Home	12-01-2020	Friendly International	3–4	Loss	Craig Taylor x 2, Connor Millar	Newry Leisure Centre, Newry, Northern Ireland
Hungary	Away	29-01-2020	UEFA Euro 2022 Qualifiers Prelim Rd	7-2	Loss	Craig Taylor, Connor Millar	Jonava Arena, Jonava, Lithuania
Lithuania	Away	30-01-2020	UEFA Euro 2022 Qualifiers Prelim Rd	5-1	Loss	Chris Donnelly	Jonava Arena, Jonava, Lithuania
Turkey	Away	01-02-2020	UEFA Euro 2022 Qualifiers Prelim Rd	4-2	Loss	Scott Gunn x 2	Jonava Arena, Jonava, Lithuania
Israel	Away	05-04-2022	FIFA 2024 World Cup Prelim Rd	3–3	Draw	Connor Millar X 3	Jonava Arena, Jonava, Lithuania

== Head coaches ==
As of February 2022

Head Coach	Northern Ireland Career	Played	Won	Drawn	Lost	Win %
(Northern Ireland) Jonathan Michael	2016–2022	33	6	2	25	18
