= Doug Reed (futsal player) =

English futsal player

Doug Reed is a professional futsal player who is currently playing for Helvecia London and England national futsal team. Previously he has played for Baku Lanzarote Tias Yaiza (Spain), AEL Limassol, MNK Uspinjača, MNK Smederevo Futsal Dynamo (Zagreb) Sussex Futsal and Manchester Futsal Club. In 2011, he won the FA Futsal Cup with Manchester Futsal Club and was awarded Player of the Tournament in the same competition. In the FA National Futsal League, he won several FA National League Championships and FA Futsal Cup medals. Reed also works as a commentator for Sony SIX, Eurosport and BT Sport, and has worked with the emerging US Professional Futsal League as well as Indian Premier Futsal.

He writes a blog on futsal at his website.
