= UEFA Futsal Euro 2022 qualifying =

Tournament details
- Dates: 29 January 2020 – 17 November 2021
- Teams: 49 (from 1 confederation)

The UEFA Futsal Euro 2022 qualifying competition will be a men's futsal competition that determines the 15 teams joining the automatically qualified hosts Netherlands in the UEFA Futsal Euro 2022 final tournament, the first tournament to be held on a four-year basis and featuring 16 teams.

A record number of 50 of the 55 UEFA member national teams entered the competition, including Austria and Northern Ireland which entered for the first time. Apart from hosts Netherlands, the remaining 49 teams entered the qualifying competition. The 16 teams which advanced to the 2020 FIFA Futsal World Cup European qualifying elite round were given byes to the qualifying group stage, which for the first time would be played in home-and-away round-robin format, while the remaining 33 teams entered in the qualifying round.

== Format ==
The qualifying competition consists of four rounds:

- Qualifying round: The 33 teams which enter this round are drawn into nine groups: six groups of four teams and three groups of three teams. Each group is played in single round-robin format at one of the teams selected as hosts before the draw. The nine group winners advance to the qualifying group stage, while the nine group runners-up and the five third-placed teams with the best record against the first and second-placed teams in their group advance to the qualifying round play-offs.
- Qualifying round play-offs: The 14 teams are drawn into seven ties to play home-and-away two-legged matches. The seven winners advance to the qualifying group stage.
- Qualifying group stage: The 32 teams (16 World Cup qualifying elite round teams which receive bye to this round, nine qualifying round group winners and seven qualifying round play-off winners) are drawn into eight groups of four. Each group is played in home-and-away round-robin format. The eight group winners and the six runners-up with the best record against all teams in their group qualify for the final tournament, while the remaining two runners-up advance to the play-offs.
- Play-offs: The two teams play home-and-away two-legged matches to determine the last qualified team.

=== Tiebreakers ===
In the qualifying round and qualifying group stage, teams are ranked according to points (3 points for a win, 1 point for a draw, 0 points for a loss), and if tied on points, the following tiebreaking criteria are applied, in the order given, to determine the rankings (Regulations Articles 14.01, 14.02 and 17.01):

1. Points in head-to-head matches among tied teams;
2. Goal difference in head-to-head matches among tied teams;
3. Goals scored in head-to-head matches among tied teams;
4. (Qualifying group stage only) Away goals scored in head-to-head matches among tied teams;
5. If more than two teams are tied, and after applying all head-to-head criteria above, a subset of teams are still tied, all head-to-head criteria above are reapplied exclusively to this subset of teams;
6. Goal difference in all group matches;
7. Goals scored in all group matches;
8. (Qualifying group stage only) Away goals scored in all group matches;
9. (Qualifying group stage only) Wins in all group matches;
10. (Qualifying group stage only) Away wins in all group matches;
11. (Qualifying round only) Penalty shoot-out if only two teams have the same number of points, and they met in the last round of the group and are tied after applying all criteria above (not used if more than two teams have the same number of points, or if their rankings are not relevant for qualification for the next stage);
12. Disciplinary points (red card = 3 points, yellow card = 1 point, expulsion for two yellow cards in one match = 3 points);
13. UEFA coefficient ranking for the qualifying round or qualifying group stage draw;
14. (Qualifying round only) Drawing of lots.

To determine the five best third-placed teams from the qualifying round, the results against the teams in fourth place are discarded. To determine the six best runners-up from the qualifying group stage, all results are considered. The following criteria are applied (Regulations Articles 14.04 and 15.02):

1. Points;
2. Goal difference;
3. Goals scored;
4. (Qualifying group stage only) Away goals scored;
5. (Qualifying group stage only) Wins;
6. (Qualifying group stage only) Away wins;
7. Disciplinary points;
8. UEFA coefficient ranking for the qualifying round or qualifying group stage draw;
9. (Qualifying round only) Drawing of lots

In the qualifying round play-offs and play-offs, the team that scores more goals on aggregate over the two legs qualifies for the final tournament. If the aggregate score is level, the away goals rule is applied, i.e., the team that scores more goals away from home over the two legs advances. If away goals are also equal, extra time is played. The away goals rule is again applied after extra time, i.e., if there are goals scored during extra time and the aggregate score is still level, the visiting team advances by virtue of more away goals scored. If no goals are scored during extra time, the tie is decided by penalty shoot-out (Regulations Article 21.01).

== Schedule ==
The qualifying matches are played on dates that fall within the FIFA Futsal International Match Calendar.

Schedule for UEFA Futsal Euro 2022 qualifying
| Round | Draw | Dates | Original dates |
|---|---|---|---|
| Qualifying round | 7 November 2019 | 29 January – 1 February 2020 | |
| Qualifying round play-offs | 13 February 2020 | 2–11 November 2020 | 6–15 April 2020 |
| Qualifying group stage | 2 September 2020 (originally 14 May 2020) | 6–9 December 2020; 25 January – 3 February 2021; 1–10 March 2021; 5–14 April 2021 | Matchdays 1 & 2: February 2021; Matchdays 3 & 4: April 2021; Matchdays 5 & 6: September 2021 |
| Play-offs | 2 September 2020 (originally September 2021) | 14–17 November 2021 | October 2021 |

In the qualifying round, the schedule of each group is as follows, with one rest day between matchdays 2 and 3 for four-team groups, and no rest days for three-team groups (Regulations Articles 13.03, 23.02 and 23.03):

Note: For scheduling, the hosts are considered as Team 1, while the visiting teams are considered as Team 2, Team 3, and Team 4 according to their group positions.

Qualifying round schedule
| Matchday | Matches (4 teams) | Matches (3 teams) |
|---|---|---|
| Matchday 1 | 2 v 4, 3 v 1 | 3 v 1 |
| Matchday 2 | 3 v 2, 1 v 4 | 2 v 3 |
| Matchday 3 | 4 v 3, 1 v 2 | 1 v 2 |

In the qualifying group stage, the schedule of each group is as follows (Regulations Article 16.03):

Qualifying group stage schedule
| Matchday | Matches |
|---|---|
| Matchday 1 | 2 v 3, 4 v 1 |
| Matchday 2 | 1 v 2, 3 v 4 |
| Matchday 3 | 3 v 1, 2 v 4 |
| Matchday 4 | 1 v 3, 4 v 2 |
| Matchday 5 | 3 v 2, 1 v 4 |
| Matchday 6 | 2 v 1, 4 v 3 |

== Qualifying round ==
=== Draw ===
The draw for the qualifying round was held on 7 November 2019, 13:30 CET (UTC+1), at the UEFA headquarters in Nyon, Switzerland. The seeding was based on the new Elo-based futsal men's national-team coefficient ranking taken on 28 October 2019. The 33 teams were drawn into nine groups: six groups of four containing one team from each of the seeding positions 1–4, and three groups of three containing one team from each of the seeding positions 1–3. First, the nine teams which were pre-selected as hosts were drawn from their own designated pot and allocated to their respective group as per their seeding positions (since Malta were in seeding position 4, they had to be host a four-team group). Next, the remaining 24 teams were drawn from their respective pot which were allocated according to their seeding positions. Based on the decisions taken by the UEFA Emergency Panel, Kosovo and Bosnia and Herzegovina could not be drawn in the same group.

Final tournament hosts
| Team | Coeff. | Rank |
|---|---|---|
| **Netherlands** | 1641.41 | 17 |

Participating teams for UEFA Futsal Euro 2022 qualifying

Teams entering qualifying group stage
| Team | Coeff. | Rank |
|---|---|---|
| Spain | 2112.09 | 1 |
| Russia | 2099.41 | 2 |
| Portugal | 2088.92 | 3 |
| Kazakhstan | 2074.58 | 4 |
| Azerbaijan | 2013.86 | 5 |
| Ukraine | 2002.36 | 6 |
| Serbia | 1975.44 | 7 |
| Italy | 1963.53 | 8 |
| Slovenia | 1926.99 | 9 |
| Croatia | 1919.50 | 10 |
| Czech Republic | 1802.24 | 11 |
| Belarus | 1800.94 | 12 |
| Romania | 1756.91 | 13 |
| France | 1740.99 | 15 |
| Slovakia | 1713.56 | 16 |
| Finland | 1590.30 | 21 |

Teams entering qualifying round
| Team | Coeff. | Rank | Seed |
|---|---|---|---|
| Hungary | 1746.28 | 14 | 1 |
| Bosnia and Herzegovina **(H)** | 1641.36 | 18 | 1 |
| Poland | 1600.21 | 19 | 1 |
| Belgium **(H)** | 1594.81 | 20 | 1 |
| Georgia **(H)** | 1587.09 | 22 | 1 |
| Latvia **(H)** | 1486.86 | 23 | 1 |
| North Macedonia **(H)** | 1478.80 | 24 | 1 |
| Moldova **(H)** | 1395.49 | 25 | 1 |
| Albania | 1372.66 | 26 | 1 |
| Turkey | 1356.47 | 27 | 2 |
| Kosovo | 1351.84 | 28 | 2 |
| Montenegro | 1342.09 | 29 | 2 |
| England | 1338.14 | 30 | 2 |
| Sweden | 1314.92 | 31 | 2 |
| Switzerland | 1233.17 | 32 | 2 |
| Norway | 1213.04 | 33 | 2 |
| Bulgaria **(H)** | 1202.87 | 34 | 2 |
| Denmark | 1176.30 | 35 | 2 |
| Armenia | 1135.14 | 36 | 3 |
| Greece | 1109.10 | 37 | 3 |
| Germany | 1104.34 | 38 | 3 |
| Cyprus | 1065.11 | 39 | 3 |
| Wales | 1062.77 | 40 | 3 |
| Lithuania **(H)** | 1043.10 | 41 | 3 |
| Israel | 1017.78 | 42 | 3 |
| Andorra | 910.95 | 43 | 3 |
| Estonia | 882.75 | 44 | 3 |
| Malta **(H)** | 856.48 | 45 | 4 |
| Gibraltar | 824.33 | 46 | 4 |
| San Marino | 807.01 | 47 | 4 |
| Scotland | 798.50 | 48 | 4 |
| Northern Ireland | 757.59 | 49 | 4 |
| Austria | 757.59 | 50 | 4 |

Notes

- Teams marked in **bold** have qualified for the final tournament.
- (H): Teams pre-selected as hosts for the qualifying round

Did not enter (all no rank)
| Faroe Islands | Iceland | Liechtenstein |
| Luxembourg | Republic of Ireland | |

=== Groups ===
The winners of each group advanced to the qualifying group stage, while the runners-up of each group and the five best third-placed teams advanced to the qualifying round play-offs. The qualifying round was scheduled to be played between 29 January and 1 February 2020.

Times are CET (UTC+1), as listed by UEFA (local times, if different, are in parentheses).

==== Group A ====
| Pos | Team | Pld | W | D | L | GF | GA | GD | Pts | Qualification |
|---|---|---|---|---|---|---|---|---|---|---|
| 1 | Bosnia and Herzegovina (H) | 3 | 3 | 0 | 0 | 22 | 10 | +12 | **9** | Qualifying group stage |
| 2 | Cyprus | 3 | 2 | 0 | 1 | 14 | 9 | +5 | **6** | Qualifying round play-offs |
| 3 | Switzerland | 3 | 1 | 0 | 2 | 8 | 12 | −4 | **3** | Qualifying round play-offs |
| 4 | Gibraltar | 3 | 0 | 0 | 3 | 3 | 16 | −13 | **0** | |

Source: UEFA
Rules for classification: Tiebreakers
(H) Hosts
29 January 2020
16:00

| Cyprus | 4–8 | Bosnia and Herzegovina |
|---|---|---|
| Kokkinos 13:47; Kouloumbris 22:32; Kanjo 28:26; Omirou 30:43 | Report | Bošković 2:35; Petak 7:41, 18:08, 25:46; Radmilović 9:42; Džindić 12:37; Ivanković 22:59; Hrkač 39:05 |

Arena Zenica, Zenica
Referee: Kirill Naishouler (Finland), Ibrahim El Jilali (Netherlands)
29 January 2020
19:00

| Switzerland | 3–1 | Gibraltar |
|---|---|---|
| Buckson 9:20; Uebelhart 28:35; Marcoyannakis 30:44 | Report | Lopez 4:43 |

Arena Zenica, Zenica
Referee: Yaroslav Vovchok (Ukraine), Kaloyan Kirilov (Bulgaria)

30 January 2020
16:00

| Cyprus | 6–1 | Switzerland |
|---|---|---|
| Diniz Pereira 19:56; Kouloumbris 21:01; Kanjo 29:36; Kokkinos 29:56; Omirou 33:10, 38:41 | Report | Florin 5:29 |

Arena Zenica, Zenica
Referee: Kaloyan Kirilov (Bulgaria), Kirill Naishouler (Finland)
30 January 2020
19:00

| Bosnia and Herzegovina | 9–2 | Gibraltar |
|---|---|---|
| Radmilović 4:06; Petak 6:36; Rodriguez 13:17 (o.g.); Bošković 22:52, 29:00; Ivanković 23:54; Gosto 24:12; Milanović 34:16; Džindić 39:57 | Report | Ruiz 25:49; Collado 38:11 |

Arena Zenica, Zenica
Referee: Ibrahim El Jilali (Netherlands), Yaroslav Vovchok (Ukraine)

1 February 2020
15:00

| Gibraltar | 0–4 | Cyprus |
|---|---|---|
| | Report | Kouloumbris 4:19; Alexiou 11:01; Kanjo 24:07; Diniz Pereira 35:02 |

Arena Zenica, Zenica
Referee: Yaroslav Vovchok (Ukraine), Kirill Naishouler (Finland)
1 February 2020
19:00

| Bosnia and Herzegovina | 5–4 | Switzerland |
|---|---|---|
| Radmilović 11:01; Džindić 23:52; Hrkač 36:59, 37:52; Bošković 37:19 | Report | Marcoyannakis 9:02; Gössi 21:48; De Freitas 22:37; Buckson 35:18 |

Arena Zenica, Zenica
Referee: Kaloyan Kirilov (Bulgaria), Ibrahim El Jilali (Netherlands)

==== Group B ====
| Pos | Team | Pld | W | D | L | GF | GA | GD | Pts | Qualification |
|---|---|---|---|---|---|---|---|---|---|---|
| 1 | Belgium (H) | 3 | 3 | 0 | 0 | 17 | 6 | +11 | **9** | Qualifying group stage |
| 2 | Armenia | 3 | 1 | 1 | 1 | 7 | 8 | −1 | **4** | Qualifying round play-offs |
| 3 | Montenegro | 3 | 1 | 0 | 2 | 11 | 10 | +1 | **3** | Qualifying round play-offs |
| 4 | Scotland | 3 | 0 | 1 | 2 | 7 | 18 | −11 | **1** | |

Source: UEFA
Rules for classification: Tiebreakers
(H) Hosts
29 January 2020
17:30

| Montenegro | 9–2 | Scotland |
|---|---|---|
| Il. Mugoša 2:55, 18:57, 39:03; Smith 9:29 (o.g.); Spasojević 10:37, 23:21, 30:56; Vidaković 35:00; Vukovic 37:41 | Report | Aloulou 5:42; Robertson 34:47 |

Sport Vlaanderen Herentals, Herentals
Referee: Daniel Matkovic (Switzerland), Jacob Willem Machiel van Dijke (Netherlands)
29 January 2020
20:30

| Armenia | 2–5 | Belgium |
|---|---|---|
| Francisco De Campos 3:23; Manukian 17:03 (2pen.) | Report | Dillien 6:55; Leo 10:47, 25:07; Rahou 31:43, 39:10 |

Sport Vlaanderen Herentals, Herentals
Referee: Trayan Enchev (Bulgaria), Ingus Puriņš (Latvia)

30 January 2020
17:30

| Armenia | 3–1 | Montenegro |
|---|---|---|
| Margaryan 14:06; Mashumyan 27:19; Aslanian 38:50 | Report | Spasojević 30:28 |

Sport Vlaanderen Herentals, Herentals
Referee: Jacob Willem Machiel van Dijke (Netherlands), Trayan Enchev (Bulgaria)
30 January 2020
20:30

| Belgium | 7–3 | Scotland |
|---|---|---|
| Steedman 0:41 (o.g.); Ettalaki 4:44; Dillien 6:30, 17:35, 36:47; Robertson 24:03 (o.g.); Ouadi 39:51 | Report | Ghislandi 9:38 (o.g.); Aloulou 29:47, 38:08 |

Sport Vlaanderen Herentals, Herentals
Referee: Ingus Puriņš (Latvia), Daniel Matkovic (Switzerland)

1 February 2020
14:30

| Scotland | 2–2 | Armenia |
|---|---|---|
| Steedman 2:19; Smith 19:39 | Report | Martins De Souza 5:41; Galstyan 32:50 |

Sport Vlaanderen Herentals, Herentals
Referee: Ingus Puriņš (Latvia), Trayan Enchev (Bulgaria)
1 February 2020
17:30

| Belgium | 5–1 | Montenegro |
|---|---|---|
| Rahou 23:33; Adnane 24:10; Diniz Pinheiro 29:25, 36:46; Dahbi Reda 31:41 | Report | Vuletic 2:45 |

Sport Vlaanderen Herentals, Herentals
Referee: Jacob Willem Machiel van Dijke (Netherlands), Daniel Matkovic (Switzerland)

==== Group C ====
| Pos | Team | Pld | W | D | L | GF | GA | GD | Pts | Qualification |
|---|---|---|---|---|---|---|---|---|---|---|
| 1 | Poland | 3 | 3 | 0 | 0 | 22 | 2 | +20 | **9** | Qualifying group stage |
| 2 | Greece | 3 | 1 | 1 | 1 | 7 | 9 | −2 | **4** | Qualifying round play-offs |
| 3 | Sweden | 3 | 1 | 0 | 2 | 9 | 14 | −5 | **3** | |
| 4 | Malta (H) | 3 | 0 | 1 | 2 | 5 | 18 | −13 | **1** | |

Source: UEFA
Rules for classification: Tiebreakers
(H) Hosts
29 January 2020
17:00

| Poland | 5–2 | Greece |
|---|---|---|
| Kubik 5:59, 7:16, 22:26; Marek 17:55; Lutecki 21:35 | Report | Stavrakopoulos 3:27; Karavidas 32:33 |

National School of Sport, Pembroke
Referee: Aleš Močnik Perič (Slovenia), Igor Puzović (Bosnia and Herzegovina)
29 January 2020
20:00

| Sweden | 6–4 | Malta |
|---|---|---|
| Zhubi 1:23; Cirak 4:53, 16:55; Rossi 6:57; Söderqvist 11:09; Hiseni 26:04 | Report | Azzopardi 7:19; Milijic 17:52; Telissi 20:23; Frendo 32:03 |

National School of Sport, Pembroke
Referee: Balázs Farkas (Hungary), Veljko Bošković (Montenegro)

30 January 2020
17:00

| Sweden | 0–6 | Poland |
|---|---|---|
| | Report | Leszczak 5:55; Solecki 15:04; Wojciechowski 16:09; Zastawnik 20:45, 22:50 (pen.), 30:18 |

National School of Sport, Pembroke
Referee: Veljko Bošković (Montenegro), Aleš Močnik Perič (Slovenia)
30 January 2020
20:00

| Malta | 1–1 | Greece |
|---|---|---|
| Azzopardi 20:18 | Report | Karmis 34:30 |

National School of Sport, Pembroke
Referee: Igor Puzović (Bosnia and Herzegovina), Balázs Farkas (Hungary)

1 February 2020
16:00

| Greece | 4–3 | Sweden |
|---|---|---|
| Stavrakopoulos 7:37, 20:38, 31:09; Malovits 29:53 | Report | Marrah 8:29; Smajlovic 19:37; Hiseni 26:38 |

National School of Sport, Pembroke
Referee: Igor Puzović (Bosnia and Herzegovina), Aleš Močnik Perič (Slovenia)
1 February 2020
19:00

| Malta | 0–11 | Poland |
|---|---|---|
| | Report | Leszczak 3:31, 30:39 (2pen.); Marek 5:09, 18:24; Gladczak 10:51, 32:19; Solecki 14:18; Wędzony 22:15, 30:10; Lutecki 25:44, 36:04 |

National School of Sport, Pembroke
Referee: Balázs Farkas (Hungary), Veljko Bošković (Montenegro)

==== Group D ====
| Pos | Team | Pld | W | D | L | GF | GA | GD | Pts | Qualification |
|---|---|---|---|---|---|---|---|---|---|---|
| 1 | Albania | 3 | 2 | 0 | 1 | 8 | 3 | +5 | **6** | Qualifying group stage |
| 2 | San Marino | 3 | 1 | 1 | 1 | 4 | 5 | −1 | **4** | Qualifying round play-offs |
| 3 | Bulgaria (H) | 3 | 1 | 1 | 1 | 4 | 6 | −2 | **4** | Qualifying round play-offs |
| 4 | Andorra | 3 | 1 | 0 | 2 | 2 | 4 | −2 | **3** | |

Source: UEFA
Rules for classification: Tiebreakers
(H) Hosts
29 January 2020
16:30 (17:30 EET)

| Albania | 4–1 | San Marino |
|---|---|---|
| Kaca 4:20; Selmanaj 18:33, 22:19; Rexhepaj 31:06 | Report | Belloni 12:48 |

Palace of Culture and Sports, Varna
Referee: Petar Radojčić (Serbia), Yiangos Yiangou (Cyprus)
29 January 2020
19:00 (20:00 EET)

| Andorra | 1–2 | Bulgaria |
|---|---|---|
| Debboun 11:09 | Report | Bo. Marev 16:55; Karageorgiev 23:39 |

Palace of Culture and Sports, Varna
Referee: Stefan Vrijens (Belgium), Grigori Ošomkov (Estonia)

30 January 2020
16:30 (17:30 EET)

| Andorra | 1–0 | Albania |
|---|---|---|
| Massana Valls 29:59 | Report |

Palace of Culture and Sports, Varna
Referee: Grigori Ošomkov (Estonia), Petar Radojčić (Serbia)
30 January 2020
19:00 (20:00 EET)

| Bulgaria | 1–1 | San Marino |
|---|---|---|
| Stanković 33:05 | Report | Busignani 25:02 |

Palace of Culture and Sports, Varna
Referee: Yiangos Yiangou (Cyprus), Stefan Vrijens (Belgium)

1 February 2020
16:00 (17:00 EET)

| San Marino | 2–0 | Andorra |
|---|---|---|
| Mattioli 35:56; Moretti 39:49 | Report |

Palace of Culture and Sports, Varna
Referee: Grigori Ošomkov (Estonia), Yiangos Yiangou (Cyprus)
1 February 2020
19:00 (20:00 EET)

| Bulgaria | 1–4 | Albania |
|---|---|---|
| Stanković 31:00 | Report | Halimi 0:47, 38:38; Karaja 15:43; Selmanaj 26:04 |

Palace of Culture and Sports, Varna
Referee: Stefan Vrijens (Belgium), Petar Radojčić (Serbia)

==== Group E ====
| Pos | Team | Pld | W | D | L | GF | GA | GD | Pts | Qualification |
|---|---|---|---|---|---|---|---|---|---|---|
| 1 | Hungary | 3 | 3 | 0 | 0 | 14 | 3 | +11 | **9** | Qualifying group stage |
| 2 | Lithuania (H) | 3 | 2 | 0 | 1 | 9 | 7 | +2 | **6** | Qualifying round play-offs |
| 3 | Turkey | 3 | 1 | 0 | 2 | 6 | 8 | −2 | **3** | Qualifying round play-offs |
| 4 | Northern Ireland | 3 | 0 | 0 | 3 | 5 | 16 | −11 | **0** | |

Source: UEFA
Rules for classification: Tiebreakers
(H) Hosts
29 January 2020
15:00 (16:00 EET)

| Hungary | 7–2 | Northern Ireland |
|---|---|---|
| Glenholmes 4:02 (o.g.); Nagy 7:40; Rábl 10:53; Pál 11:31; Horváth 28:26, 37:52; Dávid 34:33 | Report | Taylor 18:52; Millar 25:19 |

Jonava Sports Arena, Jonava
Referee: Lukáš Peško (Slovakia), Juan Boelen (Belgium)
29 January 2020
17:30 (18:30 EET)

| Turkey | 2–3 | Lithuania |
|---|---|---|
| Akparlak 18:22; Özkan 24:29 | Report | Zagurskas 28:16; Sendžikas 34:15, 35:34 (2pen.) |

Jonava Sports Arena, Jonava
Referee: Timo Onatsu (Finland), Peter Nurse (England)

30 January 2020
15:00 (16:00 EET)

| Turkey | 0–3 | Hungary |
|---|---|---|
| | Report | Dróth 21:48; Dávid 25:14, 37:34 |

Jonava Sports Arena, Jonava
Referee: Peter Nurse (England), Lukáš Peško (Slovakia)
30 January 2020
17:30 (18:30 EET)

| Lithuania | 5–1 | Northern Ireland |
|---|---|---|
| Voskunovič 3:50, 5:09, 12:28; Sendžikas 27:58, 33:29 | Report | Donnelly 5:04 |

Jonava Sports Arena, Jonava
Referee: Juan Boelen (Belgium), Timo Onatsu (Finland)

1 February 2020
16:00 (17:00 EET)

| Northern Ireland | 2–4 | Turkey |
|---|---|---|
| Gunn 4:27, 38:01 | Report | Köseoğlu 16:36, 19:17; Aygün 37:19; C. Keskin 38:56 |

Jonava Sports Arena, Jonava
Referee: Peter Nurse (England), Juan Boelen (Belgium)
1 February 2020
19:00 (20:00 EET)

| Lithuania | 1–4 | Hungary |
|---|---|---|
| Zagurskas 13:02 | Report | Dávid 0:47; Dróth 6:39, 13:33; Rábl 29:24 |

Jonava Sports Arena, Jonava
Referee: Timo Onatsu (Finland), Lukáš Peško (Slovakia)

==== Group F ====
| Pos | Team | Pld | W | D | L | GF | GA | GD | Pts | Qualification |
|---|---|---|---|---|---|---|---|---|---|---|
| 1 | Georgia (H) | 3 | 3 | 0 | 0 | 18 | 4 | +14 | **9** | Qualifying group stage |
| 2 | Germany | 3 | 2 | 0 | 1 | 13 | 10 | +3 | **6** | Qualifying round play-offs |
| 3 | Kosovo | 3 | 1 | 0 | 2 | 9 | 16 | −7 | **3** | |
| 4 | Austria | 3 | 0 | 0 | 3 | 7 | 17 | −10 | **0** | |

Source: UEFA
Rules for classification: Tiebreakers
(H) Hosts
29 January 2020
13:00 (16:00 GET)

| Kosovo | 4–2 | Austria |
|---|---|---|
| Dobroshi 9:12; Qerimi 10:43, 11:25; Topilla 10:54 | Report | Dizdarevic 25:06 (pen.); Jatic 34:17 |

Olympic Palace, Tbilisi
Referee: Adrian Tschopp (Switzerland), Vitali Rakutski (Belarus)
29 January 2020
16:00 (19:00 GET)

| Germany | 1–3 | Georgia |
|---|---|---|
| Fischer 4:55 | Report | Sebiskveradze 10:46; Thales 28:59; Jvarashvili 30:53 |

Olympic Palace, Tbilisi
Referee: Josip Barton (Macedonia), Viktor Bugenko (Moldova)

30 January 2020
13:00 (16:00 GET)

| Germany | 8–4 | Kosovo |
|---|---|---|
| Saglam 8:57, 38:43; Meyer 13:34, 35:40, 38:36; Sözer 28:51; Hoffmann 34:43; Wittig 37:22 | Report | Maxharraj 0:27, 24:07; Qerimi 22:59; Kelmendi 29:17 |

Olympic Palace, Tbilisi
Referee: Vitali Rakutski (Belarus), Josip Barton (Macedonia)
30 January 2020
16:00 (19:00 GET)

| Georgia | 9–2 | Austria |
|---|---|---|
| Saiotti 0:26, 15:33, 17:44, 23:37; Sebiskveradze 7:46, 9:50, 15:52; Thales 34:42; Jvarashvili 39:04 | Report | Vozenilek 8:06; Steinwandter 18:41 |

Olympic Palace, Tbilisi
Referee: Viktor Bugenko (Moldova), Adrian Tschopp (Switzerland)

1 February 2020
16:00 (19:00 GET)

| Austria | 3–4 | Germany |
|---|---|---|
| Muharemovic 0:52; Dizdarevic 31:43; Meitz 38:58 (2pen.) | Report | Saglam 0:41, 21:50; Claus 17:13; Meyer 25:00 |

Olympic Palace, Tbilisi
Referee: Vitali Rakutski (Belarus), Viktor Bugenko (Moldova)
1 February 2020
19:00 (22:00 GET)

| Georgia | 6–1 | Kosovo |
|---|---|---|
| Sebiskveradze 1:58, 17:30, 28:45; Saiotti 7:59; Kurtanidze 25:33; Thales 29:31 | Report | Maxharraj 27:12 |

Olympic Palace, Tbilisi
Referee: Josip Barton (Macedonia), Adrian Tschopp (Switzerland)

==== Group G ====
| Pos | Team | Pld | W | D | L | GF | GA | GD | Pts | Qualification |
|---|---|---|---|---|---|---|---|---|---|---|
| 1 | Latvia (H) | 2 | 1 | 1 | 0 | 8 | 3 | +5 | **4** | Qualifying group stage |
| 2 | Denmark | 2 | 1 | 1 | 0 | 6 | 4 | +2 | **4** | Qualifying round play-offs |
| 3 | Estonia | 2 | 0 | 0 | 2 | 3 | 10 | −7 | **0** | |

Source: UEFA
Rules for classification: Tiebreakers
(H) Hosts
30 January 2020
18:00 (19:00 EET)

| Estonia | 1–6 | Latvia |
|---|---|---|
| Bõstrov 21:49 | Report | Ar. Kuļešovs 1:23, 10:15; Mi. Babris 4:38, 18:47; Matjušenko 24:13; Pastars 36:10 |

Zemgale Olympic Center, Jelgava
Attendance: 487
Referee: David Schärli (Switzerland), Bogdan Valentin Hanceariuc (Romania)

31 January 2020
18:00 (19:00 EET)

| Denmark | 4–2 | Estonia |
|---|---|---|
| Mengel 8:14, 15:13; Falck 12:27; Laursen 32:05 | Report | Babjak 23:06; Haagh 39:21 (o.g.) |

Zemgale Olympic Center, Jelgava
Attendance: 87
Referee: Vasilios Christodoulis (Greece), David Schärli (Switzerland)

1 February 2020
19:00 (20:00 EET)

| Latvia | 2–2 | Denmark |
|---|---|---|
| Matjušenko 17:00, 33:14 | Report | Mengel 8:17; Lucht 26:19 |

Zemgale Olympic Center, Jelgava
Attendance: 1001
Referee: Bogdan Valentin Hanceariuc (Romania), Vasilios Christodoulis (Greece)

==== Group H ====
| Pos | Team | Pld | W | D | L | GF | GA | GD | Pts | Qualification |
|---|---|---|---|---|---|---|---|---|---|---|
| 1 | Moldova (H) | 2 | 2 | 0 | 0 | 7 | 1 | +6 | **6** | Qualifying group stage |
| 2 | Israel | 2 | 0 | 1 | 1 | 2 | 5 | −3 | **1** | Qualifying round play-offs |
| 3 | England | 2 | 0 | 1 | 1 | 1 | 4 | −3 | **1** | Qualifying round play-offs |

Source: UEFA
Rules for classification: Tiebreakers
(H) Hosts
30 January 2020
17:30 (18:30 EET)

| Israel | 1–4 | Moldova |
|---|---|---|
| T. Shkolnik 37:55 | Report | Tacot 8:47; Munteanu 10:24; Nicolaiciuc 24:24, 35:26 |

FMF Futsal Arena, Ciorescu
Referee: Tomasz Frak (Poland), Vlad Nicolae Ciobanu (Romania)

31 January 2020
17:30 (18:30 EET)

| England | 1–1 | Israel |
|---|---|---|
| Ward 36:16 | Report | Lavie 33:33 |

FMF Futsal Arena, Ciorescu
Referee: Vlad Nicolae Ciobanu (Romania), Haris Curovac (Sweden)

1 February 2020
19:00 (20:00 EET)

| Moldova | 3–0 | England |
|---|---|---|
| Burdujel 3:31; Obadă 16:11; Tacot 18:05 | Report |

FMF Futsal Arena, Ciorescu
Referee: Haris Ćurovac (Sweden), Tomasz Frak (Poland)

==== Group I ====
| Pos | Team | Pld | W | D | L | GF | GA | GD | Pts | Qualification |
|---|---|---|---|---|---|---|---|---|---|---|
| 1 | Norway | 2 | 2 | 0 | 0 | 9 | 3 | +6 | **6** | Qualifying group stage |
| 2 | North Macedonia (H) | 2 | 1 | 0 | 1 | 2 | 2 | 0 | **3** | Qualifying round play-offs |
| 3 | Wales | 2 | 0 | 0 | 2 | 2 | 8 | −6 | **0** | |

Source: UEFA
Rules for classification: Tiebreakers
(H) Hosts
30 January 2020
19:00

| Wales | 0–1 | North Macedonia |
|---|---|---|
| | Report | Dandan 22:26 |

Jane Sandanski Arena, Skopje
Referee: Moshe Bohbot (Israel), Sławomir Steczko (Poland)

31 January 2020
19:00

| Norway | 7–2 | Wales |
|---|---|---|
| Hugh 2:17 (o.g.); Fossli 10:01, 34:13; Eggen 12:00; Vucenovic 27:51; Stølan 30:21; Røttingsnes 35:29 | Report | Zulkarnain 13:24; Williams 21:46 |

Jane Sandanski Arena, Skopje
Referee: Sławomir Steczko (Poland), Michael Christofides (Cyprus)

1 February 2020
19:00

| North Macedonia | 1–2 | Norway |
|---|---|---|
| Krstevski 4:48 | Report | Pedersen 22:07; Rakvaag 37:07 |

Jane Sandanski Arena, Skopje
Referee: Michael Christofides (Cyprus), Moshe Bohbot (Israel)

=== Ranking of third-placed teams ===
To determine the five best third-placed teams from the qualifying round which advance to the qualifying round play-offs, only the results of the third-placed teams against the first and second-placed teams in their group are taken into account.

| Pos | Grp | Team | Pld | W | D | L | GF | GA | GD | Pts | Qualification |
|---|---|---|---|---|---|---|---|---|---|---|---|
| 1 | D | Bulgaria | 2 | 0 | 1 | 1 | 2 | 5 | −3 | 1 | Qualifying round play-offs |
| 2 | H | England | 2 | 0 | 1 | 1 | 1 | 4 | −3 | 1 | Qualifying round play-offs |
| 3 | E | Turkey | 2 | 0 | 0 | 2 | 2 | 6 | −4 | 0 | Qualifying round play-offs |
| 4 | A | Switzerland | 2 | 0 | 0 | 2 | 5 | 11 | −6 | 0 | Qualifying round play-offs |
| 5 | B | Montenegro | 2 | 0 | 0 | 2 | 2 | 8 | −6 | 0 (Note: Tied on disciplinary points (−4). Ranked on coefficient ranking: Montenegro 29, Wales 40.) | Qualifying round play-offs |
| 6 | I | Wales | 2 | 0 | 0 | 2 | 2 | 8 | −6 | 0 | |
| 7 | G | Estonia | 2 | 0 | 0 | 2 | 3 | 10 | −7 | 0 (Note: Ranked on disciplinary points: Estonia −4, Sweden −5.) | |
| 8 | C | Sweden | 2 | 0 | 0 | 2 | 3 | 10 | −7 | 0 | |
| 9 | F | Kosovo | 2 | 0 | 0 | 2 | 5 | 14 | −9 | 0 | |

Source: UEFA
Rules for classification: 1) points; 2) goal difference; 3) goals scored; 4) disciplinary points; 5) coefficient ranking; 6) drawing of lots.

== Qualifying round play-offs ==
=== Draw ===
The draw for the qualifying round play-offs was held on 13 February 2020, 14:15 CET (UTC+1), at the UEFA headquarters in Nyon, Switzerland. The seeding of the 14 teams (nine qualifying round group runners-up and best five qualifying round third-placed teams) was based on the new Elo-based futsal men's national-team coefficient ranking taken on 3 February 2020, with the seven group runners-up with the highest coefficient ranking seeded in Pot 2, and the remaining two group runners-up and the five third-placed teams unseeded in Pot 1. They were drawn into seven ties, with the teams in Pot 2 hosting the second leg. Teams from the same qualifying round group could not be drawn against each other.

Seeded (Pot 2)
| Team | Pos. | Coeff. | Rank |
|---|---|---|---|
| North Macedonia | I2 | 1423.49 | 25 |
| Denmark | G2 | 1225.82 | 33 |
| Germany | F2 | 1181.14 | 34 |
| Greece | C2 | 1164.92 | 36 |
| Armenia | B2 | 1158.74 | 37 |
| Cyprus | A2 | 1145.80 | 39 |
| Lithuania | E2 | 1131.40 | 40 |

Unseeded (Pot 1)
| Team | Pos. | Coeff. | Rank |
|---|---|---|---|
| Israel | H2 | 1027.40 | 41 |
| San Marino | D2 | 894.05 | 44 |
| Turkey | E3 | 1276.95 | 28 |
| England | H3 | 1269.46 | 29 |
| Montenegro | B3 | 1260.29 | 31 |
| Switzerland | A3 | 1168.49 | 35 |
| Bulgaria | D3 | 1153.23 | 38 |

=== Matches ===
The winners of each tie advance to the qualifying group stage to join the 16 teams which receive byes and the nine qualifying round group winners. The qualifying round play-offs were originally scheduled to be played between 6 and 15 April 2020, but had been postponed due to the COVID-19 pandemic, to a later date comprised tentatively between June and mid-December. On 17 June 2020, UEFA announced that the matches had been rescheduled to be played between 2 and 11 November 2020.

| Team 1 | Agg. | Team 2 | 1st leg | 2nd leg |
|---|---|---|---|---|
| Turkey | 4–4 (a) | Greece | 3–3 | 1–1 |
| San Marino | 1–4 | Denmark | 1–2 | 0–2 |
| Israel | 6–5 | Cyprus | 3–2 | 3–3 |
| Switzerland | 7–7 (a) | Germany | 4–2 | 3–5 |
| England | 0–10 (awd.) (Note: The English Football Association futsal national team forfeited the UEFA Futsal qualifying round play-offs match against North Macedonia. England futsal national team is deemed to have lost both matches 5–0.) | North Macedonia | 0–5 (awd.) | 0–5 (awd.) |
| Bulgaria | 1–7 | Armenia | 0–4 | 1–3 |
| Montenegro | 5–1 | Lithuania | 3–0 | 2–1 |

Times are CET (UTC+1), as listed by UEFA (local times, if different, are in parentheses).

6 November 2020
16:00 (18:00 TRT)

| Turkey | 3–3 | Greece |
|---|---|---|
| C. Keskin 1:01; B. Keskin 18:41; Özçelik 25:17 | Report | Manos 2:00; Artinos 8:19; Ntatis 32:51 |

Gazanfer Bilge Sports Hall, İzmit
Attendance: 0
Referee: Daniel Matkovic (Switzerland), Marco Rothenfluh (Switzerland)
12 November 2020 (Note: The second leg match between Greece and Turkey was originally scheduled to be played on 10 November, 18:00 EET, but was postponed to 12 November 2020, 17:00 EET, due to the cancellation of flights between Istanbul and Athens.)
16:00 (17:00 EET)

| Greece | 1–1 | Turkey |
|---|---|---|
| Ntatis 15:56 | Report | C. Keskin 39:18 (2pen.) |

Dais Sports Hall, Athens
Attendance: 0
Referee: Alem Bajrovic (Bosnia and Herzegovina), Igor Puzović (Bosnia and Herzegovina)

4–4 on aggregate. Greece won on away goals and qualified for Group 3 of the qualifying group stage.

4 November 2020
18:00

| San Marino | 1–2 | Denmark |
|---|---|---|
| Michelotti 32:51 | Report | Falck 14:42; Fogt 25:10 |

Multieventi Sport Domus, Serravalle
Attendance: 0
Referee: Petar Radojčić (Serbia), Nebojsa Panic (Serbia)
8 November 2020
14:00

| Denmark | 2–0 | San Marino |
|---|---|---|
| Laursen 16:36; El-Ouaz 26:32 | Report |

Spar Nord Arena Slagels, Slagelse
Attendance: 0
Referee: Marjan Mladenovski (North Macedonia), Jan Kresta (Czech Republic)

Denmark won 4–1 on aggregate and qualified for Group 1 of the qualifying group stage.

3 November 2020
19:00 (20:00 IST)

| Israel | 3–2 | Cyprus |
|---|---|---|
| Cohen 1:11; Diedunov 5:14, 26:24 | Report | Stylianou 18:23; Skarparis 20:07 |

Beit Maccabi, Rishon LeZion
Attendance: 0
Referee: Vlad Nicolae Ciobanu (Romania), Daniel Deca (Romania)
7 November 2020
16:00 (17:00 EET)

| Cyprus | 3–3 | Israel |
|---|---|---|
| Kanjo 1:01, 37:11; Alexiou 12:10 | Report | Itzhak Halevy 7:06; Diedunov 19:56 (pen.), 35:48 |

Eleftheria Indoor Hall, Nicosia
Attendance: 0
Referee: Timo Onatsu (Finland), Arttu Kyynäräinen (Finland)

Israel won 6–5 on aggregate and qualified for Group 5 of the qualifying group stage.

6 November 2020
19:00

| Switzerland | 4–2 | Germany |
|---|---|---|
| Gössi 13:22, 30:58; Marcoyannakis 35:20; Silverio 36:05 | Report | Fischer 0:45; Saglam 38:31 |

GoEasy Arena, Untersiggenthal
Attendance: 0
Referee: Stefan Vrijens (Belgium), Juan Boelen (Belgium)
9 November 2020
19:00

| Germany | 5–3 | Switzerland |
|---|---|---|
| Saglam 6:50; Wittig 11:26; Zankl 29:48; Meyer 31:10; Sipahi 37:56 | Report | Buckson 16:07, 28:20; Gössi 28:36 |

Arena Ludwigsburg, Ludwigsburg
Attendance: 0
Referee: Lukáš Peško (Slovakia), Rastislav Behancin (Slovakia)

7–7 on aggregate. Switzerland won on away goals and qualified for Group 6 of the qualifying group stage.

8 November 2020
18:30

| England | 0–5 Awarded | North Macedonia |
|---|---|---|
| | Report |

Jane Sandanski Arena, Skopje (North Macedonia) (Note: The England v North Macedonia match was originally to be played in North Macedonia, due to the Football Association cutting all funding to the England national futsal team in response to the COVID-19 pandemic.)
9 November 2020
18:30

| North Macedonia | 5–0 Awarded | England |
|---|---|---|
| | Report |

Jane Sandanski Arena, Skopje

North Macedonia won on walkover (awarded 10–0 on aggregate) and qualified for Group 4 of the qualifying group stage.

6 December 2020 (Note: The two matches between Bulgaria and Armenia, originally scheduled to be played on 5 November, 18:30 EET, and 8 November, 17:00 EET, both at Palace of Culture and Sports, Varna (second leg originally scheduled to be played on 11 November, 17:00 AMT, at Yerevan Football Academy, Yerevan, before moved to Bulgaria), were postponed to 6 and 9 December due to positive COVID-19 test results on several members of the coaching staff of the Armenian national futsal team.)
17:30 (18:30 EET)

| Bulgaria | 0–4 | Armenia |
|---|---|---|
| | Report | Manukian 10:38 (2pen.), 17:51; Aslanian 19:16; Sanosyan 39:02 |

Palace of Culture and Sports, Varna
Referee: Antonios Adamopoulos (Greece), Panagiotis Ntalas (Greece)
9 December 2020
16:00 (17:00 EET)

| Armenia | 3–1 | Bulgaria |
|---|---|---|
| Aslanian 10:47; Galstyan 28:09; Sanosyan 31:34 | Report | Baharov 28:00 |

Palace of Culture and Sports, Varna (Bulgaria) (Note: The Armenia v Bulgaria match was played in Bulgaria, as UEFA announced on 20 October 2020 to temporarily suspend all UEFA matches taking place in Armenia and Azerbaijan until further notice due to the Nagorno-Karabakh conflict.)
Referee: Moshe Bohbot (Israel), Raafat Al Hamola (Israel)

Armenia won 7–1 on aggregate and qualified for Group 2 of the qualifying group stage.

2 November 2020
18:00

| Montenegro | 3–0 | Lithuania |
|---|---|---|
| Ćorović 31:05; Vidaković 35:06; Iv. Mugoša 40:00 (2pen.) | Report |

Verde Complex, Podgorica
Attendance: 0
Referee: Tomasz Frak (Poland), Sławomir Steczko (Poland)
8 November 2020
18:30 (19:30 EET)

| Lithuania | 1–2 | Montenegro |
|---|---|---|
| Sendžikas 24:35 | Report | Drašković 9:32; Vidaković 23:36 |

Jonava Sports Arena, Jonava
Attendance: 0
Referee: Marc Birkett (England), Kamil Çetin (Turkey)

Montenegro won 5–1 on aggregate and qualified for Group 7 of the qualifying group stage.

== Qualifying group stage ==
=== Draw ===
The draw for the qualifying group stage and play-offs was held on 2 September 2020, 13:15 CEST (UTC+2), at the UEFA headquarters in Nyon, Switzerland (originally scheduled on 14 May 2020, but postponed due to the COVID-19 pandemic, initially to 7 July 2020). The 32 teams were drawn into eight groups of four. The seeding of the 25 teams which had already qualified at the time of the draw (16 World Cup qualifying elite round teams which received bye to this round, and nine qualifying round group winners) was based on the new Elo-based futsal men's national-team coefficient ranking taken at the time of the draw, with eight teams seeded in each of Pots A, B and C, and one team seeded in Pot D. The seven qualifying round play-off winners, whose identity was not known at the time of the draw, were seeded in Pot E. First, the teams in Pot E were drawn into position 1 of Groups 1–7, and the team in Pot D were drawn into any of the positions 1, 2, 3 or 4 of Group 8. Next, the teams in Pots C, B and then A were drawn into any of the positions 1 (Group 8 only), 2, 3 or 4 of Groups 1–8. Based on the decisions taken by the UEFA Emergency Panel, Azerbaijan and Armenia (which may advance from the qualifying round play-offs), and Russia and Ukraine, could not be drawn in the same group.

Pot A
| Team | Coeff. | Rank |
|---|---|---|
| Spain | 2204.047 | 1 |
| Portugal | 2116.631 | 2 |
| Russia | 2098.095 | 3 |
| Kazakhstan | 2073.313 | 4 |
| Serbia | 2012.285 | 5 |
| Azerbaijan | 1990.738 | 6 |
| Croatia | 1958.361 | 7 |
| Italy | 1928.482 | 8 |

Pot B
| Team | Coeff. | Rank |
|---|---|---|
| Ukraine | 1896.725 | 9 |
| Czech Republic | 1872.788 | 10 |
| Slovenia | 1823.765 | 11 |
| Romania | 1790.859 | 12 |
| Hungary (E1) | 1771.058 | 13 |
| France | 1717.830 | 14 |
| Finland | 1715.791 | 15 |
| Slovakia | 1699.141 | 16 |

Pot C
| Team | Coeff. | Rank |
|---|---|---|
| Belarus | 1682.792 | 17 |
| Bosnia and Herzegovina (A1) | 1669.033 | 18 |
| Poland (C1) | 1643.059 | 19 |
| Belgium (B1) | 1635.426 | 21 |
| Georgia (F1) | 1627.160 | 22 |
| Latvia (G1) | 1470.151 | 23 |
| Moldova (H1) | 1454.560 | 24 |
| Albania (D1) | 1336.154 | 26 |

Pot D
| Team | Coeff. | Rank |
|---|---|---|
| Norway (I1) | 1319.691 | 27 |

Pot E (Qualifying round play-off winners)
| Team | Coeff. | Rank |
|---|---|---|
| North Macedonia | 1423.493 | 25 |
| Montenegro | 1260.291 | 31 |
| Denmark | 1225.816 | 33 |
| Switzerland | 1168.489 | 35 |
| Greece | 1164.918 | 36 |
| Armenia | 1158.737 | 37 |
| Israel | 1027.399 | 41 |

Notes

- (A1)–(I1): Qualifying round group winners

For the play-offs, the seventh and eighth best group runners-up, whose identity was not known at the time of the draw, were drawn to decide which team play the first leg at home.

=== Groups ===
The winners of each group and the six best runners-up qualify for the final tournament, while the remaining two runners-up advance to the play-offs. The qualifying group stage was originally scheduled to be played between February and September 2021. On 17 June 2020, UEFA announced that the matches had been rescheduled to be played between 2 November 2020 and 14 April 2021.

Times up to 27 March 2020 are CET (UTC+1), thereafter times are CEST (UTC+2), as listed by UEFA (local times, if different, are in parentheses).

==== Group 1 ====
| Pos | Team | Pld | W | D | L | GF | GA | GD | Pts | Qualification |
|---|---|---|---|---|---|---|---|---|---|---|
| 1 | Croatia | 6 | 6 | 0 | 0 | 28 | 6 | +22 | 18 | Final tournament |
| 2 | Ukraine | 6 | 4 | 0 | 2 | 33 | 17 | +16 | 12 | Final tournament |
| 3 | Denmark | 6 | 1 | 0 | 5 | 10 | 29 | −19 | 3 (Note: Tied on head-to-head points (3). Head-to-head goal difference: Denmark +1, Albania −1.) | |
| 4 | Albania | 6 | 1 | 0 | 5 | 8 | 27 | −19 | 3 | |

Source: UEFA
Rules for classification: Tiebreakers
Notes:
27 January 2021
17:00

| Croatia | 4–1 | Albania |
|---|---|---|
| Marinović 18:32, 30:34; Perišić 19:48; Matošević 34:13 | Report | Selmanaj 2:02 |

Varaždin Arena, Varaždin
Referee: Ingo Heemsoth (Germany), Michael Lima De Sousa (Luxembourg)

30 January 2021
15:00

| Denmark | 1–4 | Croatia |
|---|---|---|
| Jørgensen 9:42 | Report | Suton 6:35; Perišić 23:12; Marinović 31:52; Matošević 34:02 |

Ceres Arena, Aarhus
Referee: Sławomir Steczko (Poland), Dominik Cipiński (Poland)

31 January 2021
18:00

| Albania | 3–10 | Ukraine |
|---|---|---|
| Mejzini 8:53; A. Brahimi 12:07; Karaja 33:52 | Report | Zvarych 0:30, 13:43, 26:54; Shoturma 5:15; Bilotserkivets 13:03; Fareniuk 18:57, 25:35; Grytsyna 22:31; Yeromin 35:05; Malyshko 39:30 |

Tirana Olympic Park, Tirana
Referee: Ozan Soykan (Turkey), Murat Çolak (Turkey)

3 March 2021
19:00

| Albania | 1–3 | Denmark |
|---|---|---|
| Rasmussen 19:33 (o.g.) | Report | Jørgensen 13:27; Veis 27:30; Falck 38:52 |

Tirana Olympic Park, Tirana
Referee: Talgat Kosmukhambetov (Kazakhstan), Aslan Galayev (Kazakhstan)
3 March 2021
19:30

| Croatia | 3–2 | Ukraine |
|---|---|---|
| Suton 1:09; Jelovčić 34:49; Perić 37:47 | Report | Pediash 8:39; Malyshko 18:31 |

Gradski vrt Hall, Osijek
Referee: Stefan Vrijens (Belgium), Juan Boelen (Belgium)

4 March 2021
13:00

| Denmark | 2–3 | Albania |
|---|---|---|
| Falck 33:04; Hansen 39:06 | Report | Selmanaj 9:49, 28:54; Halimi 11:39 |

Tirana Olympic Park, Tirana, Albania
Referee: Haris Curovac (Sweden), Ademir Avdic (Sweden)

7 March 2021
18:00 (19:00 EET)

| Ukraine | 2–7 | Croatia |
|---|---|---|
| Shoturma 10:39 (pen.); Zvarych 11:12 | Report | Matošević 8:08; Marinović 14:44, 22:52, 34:40; Jelovčić 30:07; Kanjuh 31:47; Sukhov 38:45 (o.g.) |

Palace of Sport "Yunist", Zaporizhzhia
Referee: Kirill Naishouler (Finland), Paavo Komppa (Finland)

7 April 2021
18:00 (19:00 EET)

| Denmark | 2–6 | Ukraine |
|---|---|---|
| Falck 4:54; Zhurba 39:12 (o.g.) | Report | Pediash 4:11; Veis 17:24 (o.g.); Abakshyn 20:48, 25:34; Fareniuk 37:52, 38:31 |

Palace of Sport "Yunist", Zaporizhzhia, Ukraine
Referee: Lukáš Peško (Slovakia), Rastislav Behancin (Slovakia)
7 April 2021
19:00

| Albania | 0–3 | Croatia |
|---|---|---|
| | Report | Marinović 9:37; Perić 27:47; Sekulić 28:47 |

Tirana Olympic Park, Tirana
Referee: Yiangos Yiangou (Cyprus), Georgios Kozakos (Cyprus)

8 April 2021
18:00 (19:00 EET)

| Ukraine | 8–2 | Denmark |
|---|---|---|
| Korsun 4:03; Mykytiuk 9:46; Malyshko 10:34; Abakshyn 11:56; Lebid 18:19, 25:58; Razuvanov 21:54, 37:41 | Report | Goddard 4:48; Rasmussen 10:19 |

Palace of Sport "Yunist", Zaporizhzhia
Referee: Tomasz Frak (Poland), Dominik Cipinski (Poland)

11 April 2021
15:00

| Croatia | 7–0 | Denmark |
|---|---|---|
| Jurić 9:00, 14:06, 22:01 (pen.), 34:45; Kustura 19:29; Jurlina 25:20; Sekulić 37:22 | Report |

Varaždin Arena, Varaždin
Referee: Cristiano José Cardoso Santos (Portugal), Filipe Gonçalo Santos Duarte (Portugal)
11 April 2021

| Ukraine | 5–0 Awarded | Albania |
|---|---|---|
| | Report |

Palace of Sport "Yunist", Zaporizhzhia

==== Group 2 ====
| Pos | Team | Pld | W | D | L | GF | GA | GD | Pts | Qualification |
|---|---|---|---|---|---|---|---|---|---|---|
| 1 | Russia | 6 | 6 | 0 | 0 | 26 | 5 | +21 | 18 | Final tournament |
| 2 | Georgia | 6 | 3 | 1 | 2 | 15 | 15 | 0 | 10 | Final tournament |
| 3 | France | 6 | 1 | 2 | 3 | 18 | 20 | −2 | 5 | |
| 4 | Armenia | 6 | 0 | 1 | 5 | 9 | 28 | −19 | 1 | |

Source: UEFA
Rules for classification: Tiebreakers
8 December 2020
19:00

| France | 4–4 | Georgia |
|---|---|---|
| Ramirez 1:26 (pen.); Alla 16:05 (pen.); A. Mohammed 19:10, 19:50 | Report | Bynho 1:59; Roninho 7:23; Elisandro 9:07; Saiotti 32:18 |

Halle Georges Carpentier, Paris
Referee: Admir Zahovič (Slovenia), Aleš Močnik Perič (Slovenia)

29 January 2021
17:00 (19:00 MSK)

| Russia | 6–0 | Armenia |
|---|---|---|
| Davydov 10:02, 22:32; Shisterov 10:38; Chishkala 17:06; Robinho 22:53; Kudziev 35:35 | Report |

USC Podmoskovye, Shchyolkovo
Referee: Borislav Kolev (Bulgaria), Kaloyan Kirilov (Bulgaria)

2 February 2021
15:00 (18:00 GET)

| Georgia | 0–4 | Russia |
|---|---|---|
| | Report | Rômulo 4:38; Niyazov 9:50, 32:17; Davydov 27:03 |

Olympic Palace, Tbilisi
Referee: Josip Barton (North Macedonia), Done Ristovski (North Macedonia)

3 February 2021
14:00 (17:00 AMT)

| Armenia | 4–4 | France |
|---|---|---|
| Melkonyan 6:46, 14:26; Mashumyan 13:30; Aslanian 30:34 | Report | Lutin 15:42; N'Gala 21:24, 34:06; Ramirez 30:13 |

Yerevan Football Academy Stadium, Yerevan
Referee: David Glavonjic (Sweden), Ademir Avdic (Sweden)

5 March 2021
15:15 (18:15 GET)

| Georgia | 5–0 | Armenia |
|---|---|---|
| Elisandro 1:41, 3:31, 23:15; Sebiskveradze 26:12, 38:18 | Report |

Olympic Palace, Tbilisi
Referee: Trayan Enchev (Bulgaria), Ivo Tsenov (Bulgaria)
5 March 2021
21:05

| France | 2–3 | Russia |
|---|---|---|
| Mouhoudine 36:32; N'Gala 39:01 | Report | Chishkala 21:43; Robinho 32:29, 37:12 |

Halle Georges Carpentier, Paris
Referee: David Urdánoz Apezteguía (Spain), Javier Moreno Reina (Spain)

9 March 2021
15:00 (17:00 MSK)

| Russia | 5–1 | France |
|---|---|---|
| Abramov 12:12; Kotlyarov 28:29, 37:19; Afanasyev 31:47; Davydov 38:49 | Report | Andrade 12:54 |

USC Podmoskovye, Shchyolkovo
Referee: Vlad Nicolae Ciobanu (Romania), Bogdan Valentin Hanceariuc (Romania)

10 March 2021
14:00 (17:00 AMT)

| Armenia | 2–3 | Georgia |
|---|---|---|
| Mashumyan 11:33; Nevedrov 20:26 | Report | Kurtanidze 5:56; Bynho 8:09; Elisandro 22:03 |

Yerevan Football Academy Stadium, Yerevan
Referee: Grigori Ošomkov (Estonia), Jagnar Jakobson (Estonia)

9 April 2021
15:00 (17:00 AMT)

| Armenia | 2–5 | Russia |
|---|---|---|
| Aslanian 27:34; Nevedrov 39:54 | Report | Afanasyev 7:55, 19:59; Aslanian 9:33 (2pen.); Kudziev 35:42; Sokolov 37:36 |

Yerevan Football Academy Stadium, Yerevan
Referee: Alem Bajrovic (Bosnia and Herzegovina), Farik Keco (Bosnia and Herzegovina)
9 April 2021
16:00 (18:00 GET)

| Georgia | 3–2 | France |
|---|---|---|
| Thales 5:14, 19:54; Roninho 5:30 | Report | N'Gala 2:33; Belhaj 12:25 |

Olympic Palace, Tbilisi
Referee: Iurii Neverov (Russia), Grigori Zelentsov (Russia)

12 April 2021
16:00 (17:00 MSK)

| Russia | 3–0 | Georgia |
|---|---|---|
| Robinho 1:05; Afanasyev 2:41, 23:29 | Report |

USC Podmoskovye, Shchyolkovo
Referee: Maksim Dzeikala (Belarus), Anatoli Ustyuzhanin (Belarus)

14 April 2021
19:00

| France | 5–1 | Armenia |
|---|---|---|
| Mouhoudine 0:47, 9:00; A. Mohammed 24:02, 38:08; Belhaj 35:16 | Report | Nevedrov 5:35 (pen.) |

Halle Georges Carpentier, Paris
Referee: Ladislav Angyal (Slovakia), Stephen Vella (Malta)

==== Group 3 ====
| Pos | Team | Pld | W | D | L | GF | GA | GD | Pts | Qualification |
|---|---|---|---|---|---|---|---|---|---|---|
| 1 | Azerbaijan | 6 | 5 | 1 | 0 | 22 | 6 | +16 | 16 | Final tournament |
| 2 | Slovakia | 6 | 3 | 2 | 1 | 21 | 9 | +12 | 11 | Final tournament |
| 3 | Moldova | 6 | 1 | 2 | 3 | 14 | 22 | −8 | 5 | |
| 4 | Greece | 6 | 0 | 1 | 5 | 4 | 24 | −20 | 1 | |

Source: UEFA
Rules for classification: Tiebreakers
28 January 2021
17:30 (18:30 EET)

| Moldova | 3–1 | Greece |
|---|---|---|
| Cojocaru 10:51; Burdujel 17:28; Negara 21:36 | Report | Ntatis 10:59 |

Futsal Arena FMF, Ciorescu
Referee: Dario Pezzuto (Italia), Daniele D'adamo (San Marino)

29 January 2021
15:00 (18:00 AZT)

| Azerbaijan | 4–1 | Slovakia |
|---|---|---|
| Bolinha 4:22; Éverton Cardoso 37:59; Baghirov 39:36; Atayev 39:57 | Report | Drahovský 14:56 |

Baku Sports Palace, Baku
Referee: Irina Velikanova (Russia), Iurii Neverov (Russia)

2 February 2021
17:00

| Slovakia | 4–4 | Moldova |
|---|---|---|
| Směřička 4:55; Ševčík 5:08, 35:14; Drahovský 38:16 | Report | Burdujel 6:16; Laşcu 12:59; Nicolaiciuc 25:36; Negara 34:52 |

Aréna Poprad, Poprad
Attendance: 0
Referee: Juan Boelen (Belgium), Daniel Stauber (Austria)
2 February 2021
17:00 (18:00 EET)

| Greece | 0–3 | Azerbaijan |
|---|---|---|
| | Report | Vassoura 1:04; Eduardo 1:38; Chovdarov 25:58 |

Dais Sports Hall, Athens
Referee: Ibrahim El Jilali (Netherlands), Lars van Leeuwen (Netherlands)

4 March 2021
16:00 (19:00 AZT)

| Azerbaijan | 5–1 | Moldova |
|---|---|---|
| Fineo 6:37; Farzaliyev 13:44; Ahmadi 14:51; Bolinha 26:49, 39:59 | Report | Tacot 25:15 |

Baku Sports Palace, Baku
Referee: Giulio Colombin (Italy), Daniele D'Adamo (San Marino)
4 March 2021
17:30

| Slovakia | 6–0 | Greece |
|---|---|---|
| Rick 13:32, 26:43, 29:50; Doša 16:43; Zaťovič 21:27; Směřička 33:57 | Report |

EUROVIA Aréna, Bratislava
Referee: Šarūnas Tamulynas (Lithuania), Mantas Pomeckis (Lithuania)

7 March 2021
17:00 (18:00 EET)

| Greece | 0–5 | Slovakia |
|---|---|---|
| | Report | Drahovský 2:18; Rafaj 16:43; Rick 28:20; Zaťovič 28:41; Serbin 28:58 |

Dais Sports Hall, Athens
Referee: Moshe Bohbot (Israel), Idan Berenshtein (Israel)

9 March 2021
17:30 (18:30 EET)

| Moldova | 3–5 | Azerbaijan |
|---|---|---|
| Laşcu 30:58; Nicolaiciuc 35:08; Negara 36:57 | Report | Ahmadi 6:57; Vassoura 22:05, 36:42; Chovdarov 27:47; Cojocaru 34:47 (o.g.) |

Futsal Arena FMF, Ciorescu
Referee: Damian Grabowski (Poland), Yasin Alageyik (Belgium)

8 April 2021
16:00

| Slovakia | 1–1 | Azerbaijan |
|---|---|---|
| Doša 14:08 | Report | Éverton Cardoso 39:29 |

Športová hala Levice, Levice
Referee: Kirill Naishouler (Finland), Arttu Kyynäräinen (Finland)

9 April 2021
17:00 (18:00 EET)

| Greece | 3–3 | Moldova |
|---|---|---|
| Gousis 21:45; Stavrakopoulos 24:18; Ntatis 25:19 | Report | Cojocaru 14:16, 18:45 (pen.); Podlesnov 22:32 |

Dais Sports Hall, Athens
Referee: Hikmat Qafarli (Azerbaijan), Knyaz Amiraslanov (Azerbaijan)

13 April 2021
17:30 (18:30 EET)

| Moldova | 0–4 | Slovakia |
|---|---|---|
| | Report | Rafaj 5:25; Směřička 24:25; Rick 26:04, 38:27 (pen.) |

Futsal Arena FMF, Ciorescu
Referee: Chiara Perona (Italy), Giulio Colombin (Italy)

14 April 2021
17:00 (19:00 AZT)

| Azerbaijan | 4–0 | Greece |
|---|---|---|
| Fineo 2:14; Gousis 13:10 (o.g.); Atayev 15:23; Chovdarov 24:03 | Report |

Baku Sports Palace, Baku
Referee: Yaroslav Vovchok (Ukraine), Yevhen Hordiienko (Ukraine)

==== Group 4 ====
| Pos | Team | Pld | W | D | L | GF | GA | GD | Pts | Qualification |
|---|---|---|---|---|---|---|---|---|---|---|
| 1 | Bosnia and Herzegovina | 6 | 5 | 0 | 1 | 18 | 10 | +8 | 15 | Final tournament |
| 2 | Serbia | 6 | 2 | 3 | 1 | 18 | 13 | +5 | 9 | Play-offs |
| 3 | Romania | 6 | 1 | 3 | 2 | 19 | 17 | +2 | 6 | |
| 4 | North Macedonia | 6 | 0 | 2 | 4 | 8 | 23 | −15 | 2 | |

Source: UEFA
Rules for classification: Tiebreakers
28 January 2021
18:00

| Bosnia and Herzegovina | 2–1 | North Macedonia |
|---|---|---|
| Bošković 7:11, 16:24 | Report | Petrović 22:15 |

Arena Zenica, Zenica
Referee: Carl Hughes (Wales), Valentin Ciuplea (Wales)
28 January 2021
18:00 (19:00 EET)

| Romania | 2–2 | Serbia |
|---|---|---|
| Felipe Oliveira 2:49; Sávio 19:10 | Report | Rakić 9:49; Tomić 11:47 |

Constantin Jude Sports Hall, Timișoara
Referee: Viktor Bugenko (Moldova), Ingus Puriņš (Latvia)

3 February 2021
18:00

| Serbia | 2–4 | Bosnia and Herzegovina |
|---|---|---|
| Pršić 17:13 (pen.); Rakić 22:27 | Report | Arnautović 5:30; Jelić 18:22; Ivanković 20:48, 33:49 |

SPC Vojvodina, Novi Sad
Referee: Ondřej Černý (Czech Republic), Jan Kresta (Czech Republic)
3 February 2021
19:00

| North Macedonia | 2–2 | Romania |
|---|---|---|
| Dandan 12:40; Rangotov 37:14 | Report | Felipe Oliveira 13:12; Ique 31:36 |

Jane Sandanski Arena, Skopje
Referee: Christian Gundler (Germany), Jacob Pawlowski (Germany)

4 March 2021
19:00 (20:00 EET)

| Romania | 2–3 | Bosnia and Herzegovina |
|---|---|---|
| Paulo Ferreira 24:19; Matei 35:52 | Report | Radmilović 8:17, 16:33; S. Ivanković 38:39 |

Polyvalent Hall, Bucharest
Referee: Denys Kutsyi (Ukraine), Sviatoslav Kliuchnyk (Ukraine)

5 March 2021
18:00

| Serbia | 1–1 | North Macedonia |
|---|---|---|
| Pršić 3:30 | Report | Krstevski 9:47 |

Sportska hala Vranje, Vranje
Referee: Maksim Dzeikala (Belarus), Anatoli Ustyuzhanin (Belarus)

9 March 2021
19:00

| North Macedonia | 1–6 | Serbia |
|---|---|---|
| Ismaili 9:15 | Report | Pršić 9:31 (pen.); Petrović 12:34 (o.g.); Petrov 14:10; Lazarević 15:10; Tomić 29:31; Rakić 35:24 |

Jane Sandanski Arena, Skopje
Referee: Murat Çolak (Turkey), Uğur Çakmak (Turkey)

10 March 2021
18:00

| Bosnia and Herzegovina | 5–0 | Romania |
|---|---|---|
| S. Ivanković 17:08; Kahvedžić 20:42, 36:33; Radmilović 24:34; Jelić 39:22 | Report |

Arena Zenica, Zenica
Referee: Dejan Veselič (Slovenia), Alman Alaberkyan (Armenia)

8 April 2021
19:00

| North Macedonia | 2–3 | Bosnia and Herzegovina |
|---|---|---|
| Rangotov 22:12; Ramadan 38:42 | Report | J. Sesar 12:29; Hrkač 35:10; Jelić 39:48 |

Jane Sandanski Arena, Skopje
Referee: Viktor Bugenko (Moldova), Jagnar Jakobson (Estonia)

9 April 2021
18:00

| Serbia | 4–4 | Romania |
|---|---|---|
| Rakić 8:47; Lazarević 14:07, 23:34; Pršić 32:07 | Report | Szöcs 1:27, 36:46; Felipe Oliveira 10:57; Cires 38:48 |

Millennium Centar, Vršac
Referee: Angelo Galante (Italy), Nicola Manzione (Italy)

14 April 2021
18:00

| Bosnia and Herzegovina | 1–3 | Serbia |
|---|---|---|
| M. Sesar 11:34 | Report | Rakić 12:07; Pršić 13:52, 13:55 |

Arena Zenica, Zenica
Referee: Adrian Tschopp (Switzerland), Valentin Ciuplea (Wales)
14 April 2021
18:00 (19:00 EET)

| Romania | 9–1 | North Macedonia |
|---|---|---|
| Arsovski 0:34 (o.g.); Savio Valadares 4:17, 14:42, 32:55; Felipe Oliveira 5:48, 23:20; Paulo Ferreira 8:39; Szöcs 13:39; Ribeiro 21:43 | Report | Petrović 24:07 |

Constantin Jude Sports Hall, Timișoara
Referee: Antonios Adamopoulos (Greece), Panagiotis Ntalas (Greece)

==== Group 5 ====
| Pos | Team | Pld | W | D | L | GF | GA | GD | Pts | Qualification |
|---|---|---|---|---|---|---|---|---|---|---|
| 1 | Kazakhstan | 6 | 6 | 0 | 0 | 30 | 5 | +25 | 18 | Final tournament |
| 2 | Belarus | 6 | 3 | 0 | 3 | 26 | 15 | +11 | 9 | Play-offs |
| 3 | Hungary | 6 | 2 | 0 | 4 | 12 | 25 | −13 | 6 | |
| 4 | Israel | 6 | 1 | 0 | 5 | 9 | 32 | −23 | 3 | |

Source: UEFA
Rules for classification: Tiebreakers
8 December 2020
19:00 (20:00 IST)

| Israel | 0–3 | Belarus |
|---|---|---|
| | Report | Rabyko 1:45; Evdokimov 25:49; Selyuk 33:45 |

Beit Maccabi, Rishon LeZion
Referee: Simon Todorovič (Slovenia), Dejan Veselic (Slovenia)

9 December 2020
14:30 (19:30 ALMT)

| Kazakhstan | 5–0 | Hungary |
|---|---|---|
| Knaub 6:14, 12:25; Nurgozhin 9:12; Akbalikov 13:48; Tursagulov 21:06 | Report |

Zhaksylyk Ushkempirov Martial Arts Complex, Nur-Sultan
Referee: Kamil Çetin (Turkey), Ozan Soykan (Turkey)

3 February 2021
14:00

| Hungary | 2–1 | Belarus |
|---|---|---|
| Rábl 4:23; Pál 29:39 | Report | Silivonchik 26:52 |

Amália Sterbinszky Sports Hall, Budapest
Referee: Lukáš Peško (Slovakia), Rastislav Behancin (Slovakia)

2 March 2021
14:30 (19:30 ALMT)

| Kazakhstan | 5–2 | Belarus |
|---|---|---|
| Yesenamanov 2:28, 21:43; Orazov 8:51; Leo 14:16; Tursagulov 28:11 | Report | Krikun 26:08; Rabyko 29:31 |

Jekpe-Jek Hall, Nur-Sultan
Referee: Iurii Neverov (Russia), Tatiana Boltneva (Russia)

3 March 2021
13:30

| Hungary | 3–7 | Israel |
|---|---|---|
| Nagy 19:38; Rutai 33:08; Vas 36:21 | Report | Lavie 1:41; Goldstein 13:24; Halevy 30:12, 36:06; Diedunov 31:47, 32:34; Shkolnik 37:34 |

Amália Sterbinszky Sports Hall, Budapest
Referee: Nicola Manzione (Italy), Chiara Perona (Italy)

8 March 2021
17:30 (19:30 FET)

| Belarus | 1–6 | Kazakhstan |
|---|---|---|
| Matveenko 23:35 | Report | Nurgozhin 6:41; Tursagulov 16:24, 36:39; Taynan 22:16; Douglas Júnior 28:16; Leo 32:51 |

Sport Palace Uruchie, Minsk
Referee: Vladimir Kadykov (Russia), Ivan Shabanov (Russia)

10 March 2021
18:00 (19:00 IST)

| Israel | 1–4 | Hungary |
|---|---|---|
| Dávid 23:39 (o.g.) | Report | Tatai 11:35; Dróth 17:05; S. Horváth 24:38; Komáromi 36:06 |

Marom Nawe Hall, Ramat Gan
Referee: Josip Dujmić (Croatia), Petek Jernej (Slovenia)

6 April 2021
13:00 (14:00 FET)

| Belarus | 14–0 | Israel |
|---|---|---|
| Selyuk 6:32, 9:25, 14:36; Krikun 8:12, 22:33; Zhigalko 12:28, 39:44; Cherneyko 13:43; Los 20:36, 37:15; Rogovik 21:48; Evdokimov 25:44; Gorbenko 32:43; Lazyuk 35:49 | Report |

Sport Palace Uruchie, Minsk
Referee: Ingus Puriņš (Latvia), Eduards Fatkulins (Latvia)
6 April 2021
14:00

| Hungary | 1–6 | Kazakhstan |
|---|---|---|
| Dróth 24:45 | Report | Yesenamanov 4:47; Valiullin 8:05; Taynan 9:49; Nagy 14:25 (o.g.); Douglas Júnior 22:55; Akbalikov 32:32 |

Amália Sterbinszky Sports Hall, Budapest
Referee: Vlad Nicolae Ciobanu (Romania), Daniel Deca (Romania)

9 April 2021 (Note: The match, originally scheduled for 28 January 2021, was postponed.)
13:00 (17:00 ALMT)

| Israel | 1–4 | Kazakhstan |
|---|---|---|
| T. Shkolnik 37:03 | Report | Taynan 16:10, 23:30; Baruchyan 18:39 (2pen.); Tokayev 19:58 |

Sairan Arena, Nur-Sultan, Kazakhstan
Referee: Kamil Çetin (Turkey), Ugur Cakmak (Turkey)

11 April 2021
14:00 (18:00 ALMT)

| Kazakhstan | 4–0 | Israel |
|---|---|---|
| Taynan 1:06, 24:17; Baltabayev 4:17; Tokayev 21:25 | Report |

Sairan Arena, Nur-Sultan
Referee: Manuel Wolf (Austria), Daniel Stauber (Austria)

13 April 2021
17:00 (18:00 FET)

| Belarus | 5–2 | Hungary |
|---|---|---|
| Zhigalko 7:06; Matveenko 11:51; Los 34:03; Selyuk 37:37; Krikun 39:45 | Report | Dróth 7:16; Pál 18:37 (p) |

Sport Palace Uruchie, Minsk
Referee: Ondřej Černý (Czech Republic), Stefan Vrijens (Belgium)

==== Group 6 ====
| Pos | Team | Pld | W | D | L | GF | GA | GD | Pts | Qualification |
|---|---|---|---|---|---|---|---|---|---|---|
| 1 | Spain | 6 | 6 | 0 | 0 | 46 | 3 | +43 | 18 | Final tournament |
| 2 | Slovenia | 6 | 4 | 0 | 2 | 31 | 10 | +21 | 12 | Final tournament |
| 3 | Latvia | 6 | 2 | 0 | 4 | 12 | 28 | −16 | 6 | |
| 4 | Switzerland | 6 | 0 | 0 | 6 | 5 | 53 | −48 | 0 | |

Source: UEFA
Rules for classification: Tiebreakers
8 December 2020
13:00

| Spain | 7–0 | Latvia |
|---|---|---|
| Lozano 2:47, 32:26; Chino 6:11; Raúl Gómez 13:00, 34:12; Solano 27:09; Jesús Herrero 35:07 | Report |

La Ciudad del Fútbol, Las Rozas de Madrid
Referee: Volha Pauliuts (Belarus), Daniel Matkovic (Switzerland)
8 December 2020
19:00

| Slovenia | 12–1 | Switzerland |
|---|---|---|
| Čujec 1:39, 12:37; Spiegel 5:27 (o.g.); Sangines 10:25 (o.g.); Osredkar 13:33, 29:56; Fetić 22:49, 29:04, 34:27; Duščak 27:27, 35:30; Hozjan 39:54 | Report | Marcoyannakis 36:17 |

Tri Lilije Hall, Laško
Referee: Marc Birkett (England), Peter Nurse (England)

29 January 2021
17:00 (18:00 EET)

| Latvia | 0–1 | Slovenia |
|---|---|---|
| | Report | Čujec 9:09 |

Zemgale Olympic Center, Jelgava
Referee: Yaroslav Vovchok (Ukraine), Yevhen Hordiienko (Ukraine)

2 February 2021
20:45

| Spain | 3–1 | Slovenia |
|---|---|---|
| Pérez 18:40; Raúl Campos 31:16, 39:16 | Report | Čujec 8:52 |

La Ciudad del Fútbol, Las Rozas de Madrid
Referee: Cédric Pelissier (France), Victor Berg-Audic (France)

5 March 2021
19:00

| Switzerland | 2–4 | Latvia |
|---|---|---|
| Marcoyannakis 13:47; Gössi 36:59 | Report | Mi. Babris 5:07; Matjušenko 28:28, 32:17; Baklanovs 38:51 |

GoEasy Freizeit & Event Center, Untersiggenthal
Referee: Radim Čep (Czech Republic), Filip Nešněra (Czech Republic)

6 March 2021
20:30

| Slovenia | 1–2 | Spain |
|---|---|---|
| Hozjan 17:42 | Report | Chino 23:58, 37:14 |

Tri Lilije Hall, Laško
Referee: Ladislav Angyal (Slovakia), Lukas Pesko (Slovakia)

9 March 2021
17:00

| Switzerland | 1–11 | Slovenia |
|---|---|---|
| Barreira 0:57 | Report | Fetić 0:15; Osredkar 5:48; Čujec 5:59; Hozjan 9:58, 14:53, 22:05; Totošković 15:23, 25:33; Gajser 22:52, 30:35; Koren 23:52 |

GoEasy Freizeit & Event Center, Untersiggenthal
Referee: Julien Lang (France), Aurélien Uzan (France)
9 March 2021
17:00 (18:00 EET)

| Latvia | 1–12 | Spain |
|---|---|---|
| Matjušenko 17:59 | Report | Cecilio 0:49, 0:59, 12:12; Ortiz 1:38; Borja 13:50; Bebe 14:59, 17:00; Raúl Gómez 19:52; Solano 25:34; Raúl Campos 30:41; Mik. Babris 36:45 (o.g.); Pola 38:33 |

Zemgale Olympic Center, Jelgava
Referee: Petar Radojčić (Serbia), Nikola Rabrenović (Serbia)

8 April 2021 (Note: The match, originally scheduled for 1 February 2021, was postponed.)
17:00 (18:00 EET)

| Latvia | 4–1 | Switzerland |
|---|---|---|
| Seņs 25:27, 36:49; Matjušenko 28:23, 39:32 | Report | Gössi 32:38 |

Salaspils sporta nams, Salaspils
Referee: Ibrahim El Jilali (Netherlands), Lars Van Leeuwen (Netherlands)

10 April 2021 (Note: The match, originally scheduled for 29 January 2021, was postponed.)
21:00

| Switzerland | 0–8 | Spain |
|---|---|---|
| | Report | Mellado 1:15, 31:28; Sergio González 10:22; Eric Pérez 13:45, 35:40; Raúl Gómez 18:05; Fernan 28:56, 39:39 |

La Ciudad del Fútbol, Las Rozas de Madrid, Spain
Referee: Volha Pauliuts (Belarus), Fatma Özlem Tursun (Turkey)

12 April 2021
18:30

| Slovenia | 5–3 | Latvia |
|---|---|---|
| Čujec 1:41, 21:19; Mi. Babris 1:59 (o.g.); Totošković 17:03; Fideršek 19:36 | Report | Matjušenko 0:33, 4:20; J. Pastars 30:21 |

Tri Lilije Hall, Laško
Referee: Besar Beqiri (Kosovo), Besart Ismajli (Kosovo)
12 April 2021
21:00

| Spain | 14–0 | Switzerland |
|---|---|---|
| Mellado 1:16, 24:27; Raúl Campos 2:43, 22:37; Fernan 8:57; Solano 14:09, 37:48; Chino 14:55; Adri 17:54, 26:09; Alberto García 19:04; Reinert 32:40 (o.g.); Bebe 33:42; Raúl Gómez 35:39 | Report |

La Ciudad del Fútbol, Las Rozas de Madrid
Referee: Vladimir Kadykov (Russia), Irina Velikanova (Russia)

==== Group 7 ====
| Pos | Team | Pld | W | D | L | GF | GA | GD | Pts | Qualification |
|---|---|---|---|---|---|---|---|---|---|---|
| 1 | Italy | 6 | 5 | 0 | 1 | 24 | 12 | +12 | 15 | Final tournament |
| 2 | Finland | 6 | 3 | 1 | 2 | 20 | 18 | +2 | 10 | Final tournament |
| 3 | Belgium | 6 | 2 | 1 | 3 | 20 | 20 | 0 | 7 | |
| 4 | Montenegro | 6 | 1 | 0 | 5 | 8 | 22 | −14 | 3 | |

Source: UEFA
Rules for classification: Tiebreakers
28 January 2021
18:00

| Montenegro | 0–3 | Italy |
|---|---|---|
| | Report | Gaio 7:37; Vieira 9:28; Musumeci 35:23 |

Verde Complex, Podgorica
Referee: Adrian Tschopp (Switzerland), George Jansizian (Sweden)
28 January 2021
20:00

| Belgium | 3–3 | Finland |
|---|---|---|
| Leo 18:13; Rahou 21:04, 27:33 | Report | Intala 21:46; M. Kytölä 28:17; Junno 33:56 |

Country Hall Liège, Liège
Referee: Yiangos Yiangou (Cyprus), Georgios Kozakos (Cyprus)

2 February 2021
15:00

| Italy | 7–4 | Finland |
|---|---|---|
| Nicolodi 3:19, 19:07; Murilo 10:15; Musumeci 23:56; Marcelo 26:21; Gaio 28:14; Alano 37:50 | Report | Jyrkiäinen 4:00; Junno 18:17; Grönholm 24:37; Kunnas 24:58 |

Estraforum Hall, Prato
Referee: Eduardo Fernandes Coelho (Portugal), Miguel Castilho (Portugal)
2 February 2021
20:00

| Belgium | 6–2 | Montenegro |
|---|---|---|
| Rahou 1:36; Ah. Sababti 5:54; Leo 23:08; Dillien 27:08, 29:00; Ettalaki 38:02 | Report | Ćorović 19:31; Il. Mugoša 32:10 |

Country Hall Liège, Liège
Referee: Daniel Matkovic (Switzerland), David Schärli (Switzerland)

4 March 2021
18:00

| Montenegro | 4–3 | Belgium |
|---|---|---|
| Il. Mugoša 4:42, 21:23; Vidaković 24:02, 32:49 | Report | Adnane 12:36; Dillien 24:51; Ghislandi 39:42 |

Verde Complex, Podgorica
Referee: Michael Christofides (Cyprus), Yiangos Yiangou (Cyprus)

5 March 2021
17:30 (18:30 EET)

| Finland | 2–4 | Italy |
|---|---|---|
| Junno 28:15; Lintula 38:38 | Report | Nicolodi 3:05; Vieira 13:05; De Matos 35:35; Miarelli 37:29 |

Energia Areena, Vantaa
Referee: Marc Birkett (England), Gordon McCabe (Scotland)

8 March 2021
17:10 (18:10 EET)

| Finland | 6–1 | Montenegro |
|---|---|---|
| Jyrkiäinen 1:31; Junno 9:07, 13:05; Iv. Mugoša 26:33 (o.g.); Pikkarainen 30:11; Alasuutari 33:04 | Report | Pikkarainen 17:21 (o.g.) |

Energia Areena, Vantaa
Referee: Josip Barton (North Macedonia), Marjan Mladenovski (North Macedonia)

9 March 2021
19:00

| Italy | 4–1 | Belgium |
|---|---|---|
| Alex Merlim 19:11; Vieira 27:23, 29:00; Tonidandel 36:58 | Report | Dillien 10:02 |

Estraforum Hall, Prato
Referee: Martin Matula (Slovakia), Peter Budač (Slovakia)

8 April 2021
20:00

| Belgium | 5–4 | Italy |
|---|---|---|
| Diniz Pinheiro 2:05; Ghislandi 4:10; Rahou 9:45; Leo 28:39, 30:44 | Report | Musumeci 5:58, 36:06; Ah. Sababti 19:42 (o.g.); Alano 32:11 |

Country Hall Liège, Liège
Referee: Aurélien Uzan (France), Michael Lima De Sousa (Luxembourg)

9 April 2021
18:00

| Montenegro | 1–2 | Finland |
|---|---|---|
| Ćorović 9:12 (pen.) | Report | Junno 8:38; Jyrkiäinen 39:39 |

Verde Complex, Podgorica
Referee: Eduardo Fernandes Coelho (Portugal), Ruben António Cardoso Santos (Portugal)

13 April 2021
17:10 (18:10 EET)

| Finland | 3–2 | Belgium |
|---|---|---|
| Jyrkiäinen 23:12; Vanha 35:43; Autio 36:37 | Report | Adnane 35:24; Diniz Pinheiro 37:26 |

Energia Areena, Vantaa
Referee: Marc Birkett (England), Peter Nurse (England)
13 April 2021
18:30

| Italy | 2–0 | Montenegro |
|---|---|---|
| Gaio 2:38; Fantecele 36:35 | Report |

Estraforum Hall, Prato
Referee: David Glavonjic (Sweden), George Jansizian (Sweden)

==== Group 8 ====
| Pos | Team | Pld | W | D | L | GF | GA | GD | Pts | Qualification |
|---|---|---|---|---|---|---|---|---|---|---|
| 1 | Portugal | 6 | 4 | 2 | 0 | 24 | 7 | +17 | 14 | Final tournament |
| 2 | Poland | 6 | 3 | 2 | 1 | 20 | 14 | +6 | 11 | Final tournament |
| 3 | Czech Republic | 6 | 2 | 2 | 2 | 22 | 19 | +3 | 8 | |
| 4 | Norway | 6 | 0 | 0 | 6 | 2 | 28 | −26 | 0 | |

Source: UEFA
Rules for classification: Tiebreakers
29 January 2021
22:15 (21:15 WET)

| Portugal | 2–2 | Poland |
|---|---|---|
| Pedro Cary 34:47; Tiago Brito 35:22 | Report | Szczypczyński 17:51; Zastawnik 33:54 |

Pavilhão do Parque Desportivo Municipal de Mafra, Mafra
Referee: Angelo Galante (Italia), Nicola Manzione (Italia)
29 January 2021

| Czech Republic | 5–0 Awarded | Norway |
|---|---|---|
| | Report |

Sportovní hala Vodova, Brno

1 February 2021

| Norway | 0–5 Awarded | Czech Republic |
|---|---|---|
| | Report |

Sportovní hala Vodova, Brno, Czech Republic

3 February 2021
16:00

| Poland | 0–3 | Portugal |
|---|---|---|
| | Report | Cardinal 14:55, 37:01 (pen.); André Coelho 19:29 |

Atlas Arena, Łódź
Referee: David Urdánoz Apezteguía (Spain), Juan José Cordero Gallardo (Spain)

5 March 2021
13:50

| Norway | 0–3 | Poland |
|---|---|---|
| | Report | Grubalski 10:47; Marek 23:47, 28:02 |

Atlas Arena, Łódź, Poland
Referee: Ingo Heemsoth (Germany), Jacob Pawlowski (Germany)

6 March 2021
19:00

| Portugal | 3–3 | Czech Republic |
|---|---|---|
| Miguel Ângelo 4:32; Pany Varela 7:25; Fábio Cecílio 27:38 | Report | Seidler 3:21; Slováček 7:02; Vítor Hugo 31:27 (o.g.) |

Atlas Arena, Łódź, Poland
Referee: Ibrahim El Jilali (Netherlands), Jacob Willem Machiel Van Dijke (Netherlands)

8 March 2021
17:30

| Poland | 4–1 | Norway |
|---|---|---|
| Elsner 3:04; Marek 13:43; Hoły 23:18; Grubalski 36:03 | Report | Røttingsnes 39:20 |

Atlas Arena, Łódź
Referee: Besar Beqiri (Kosovo), Besart Ismajli (Kosovo)

9 March 2021
15:00

| Czech Republic | 1–5 | Portugal |
|---|---|---|
| Koudelka 19:41 (pen.) | Report | Pany Varela 1:05; Jesus 8:42; André Coelho 11:48; Bruno Coelho 21:00, 31:08 |

Atlas Arena, Łódź, Poland
Referee: David Grøndal Nissen (Denmark), Martin Køster (Denmark)

9 April 2021
20:20

| Czech Republic | 3–3 | Poland |
|---|---|---|
| Seidler 9:15; Vnuk 14:46; Rešetár 25:46 | Report | Kriezel 4:58; Grubalski 6:56; Zastawnik 22:52 |

Sparta Praha, Prague
Referee: Juan José Cordero Gallardo (Spain), Alejandro Martinez Flores (Spain)

12 April 2021
19:30 (18:30 WET)

| Norway | 1–7 | Portugal |
|---|---|---|
| Høvik 8:54 | Report | André 8:18; Jesus 10:17, 24:29; Bruno Coelho 12:01; Tiago Brito 15:43, 18:18; André Coelho 23:45 |

Pavilhão Municipal da Torre da Marinha, Seixal, Portugal
Referee: Norbert Szilágyi (Hungary), Péter Zimonyi (Hungary)

14 April 2021
16:15

| Poland | 8–5 | Czech Republic |
|---|---|---|
| Elsner 4:59; Kubik 9:26; Marek 11:23; Leszczak 25:15, 25:47, 36:22 (pen.), 39:54; Lutecki 37:13 | Report | Janovský 2:33; D. Drozd 12:17; Koudelka 17:27; Seidler 24:57; Rešetár 37:24 |

Stegu Arena, Opole
Referee: Admir Zahovič (Slovenia), Aleš Mocnik Peric (Slovenia)
14 April 2021
19:00 (18:00 WET)

| Portugal | 4–0 | Norway |
|---|---|---|
| João Matos 0:56; Fábio Cecílio 8:57, 14:25; Silvestre Ferreira 22:45 | Report |

Pavilhão Municipal da Torre da Marinha, Seixal
Referee: Nebojša Panić (Serbia), Nikola Rabrenović (Serbia)

=== Ranking of second-placed teams ===
| Pos | Grp | Team | Pld | W | D | L | GF | GA | GD | Pts | Qualification |
|---|---|---|---|---|---|---|---|---|---|---|---|
| 1 | 6 | Slovenia | 6 | 4 | 0 | 2 | 31 | 10 | +21 | 12 | Final tournament |
| 2 | 1 | Ukraine | 6 | 4 | 0 | 2 | 33 | 17 | +16 | 12 | Final tournament |
| 3 | 3 | Slovakia | 6 | 3 | 2 | 1 | 21 | 9 | +12 | 11 | Final tournament |
| 4 | 8 | Poland | 6 | 3 | 2 | 1 | 20 | 14 | +6 | 11 | Final tournament |
| 5 | 7 | Finland | 6 | 3 | 1 | 2 | 20 | 18 | +2 | 10 | Final tournament |
| 6 | 2 | Georgia | 6 | 3 | 1 | 2 | 15 | 15 | 0 | 10 | Final tournament |
| 7 | 5 | Belarus | 6 | 3 | 0 | 3 | 26 | 15 | +11 | 9 | Play-offs |
| 8 | 4 | Serbia | 6 | 2 | 3 | 1 | 18 | 13 | +5 | 9 | Play-offs |

Source: UEFA
Rules for classification: 1) points; 2) goal difference; 3) goals scored; 4) away goals scored; 5) wins; 6) away wins; 7) disciplinary points; 8) coefficient ranking.

== Play-offs ==
The winner qualifies for the final tournament. The play-offs were originally scheduled to be played in October 2021. On 17 June 2020, UEFA announced that the matches had been rescheduled to be played between 14 and 17 November 2021.

| Team 1 | Agg. | Team 2 | 1st leg | 2nd leg |
|---|---|---|---|---|
| Serbia | 6–3 | Belarus | 3–1 | 3–2 |

Times are CET (UTC+1), as listed by UEFA (local times, if different, are in parentheses).

15 November 2021
18:00

| Serbia | 3–1 | Belarus |
|---|---|---|
| Aleksić 6:26; Scherbich 17:36 (o.g.); Pršić 27:36 | Report | Los 37:19 |

Jezero Hall, Kragujevac
Referee: Eduardo Fernandes Coelho (Portugal), Miguel Castilho (Portugal)
17 November 2021
16:30 (18:30 FET)

| Belarus | 2–3 | Serbia |
|---|---|---|
| Selyuk 35:03; Krikun 39:33 | Report | Tomić 11:34; Momčilović 16:06; Rakić 26:26 |

Sport Palace Uruchie, Minsk
Referee: Ondřej Černý (Czech Republic), Jan Kresta (Czech Republic)

== Qualified teams ==
The following 16 teams qualify for the final tournament.

| Team | Qualified as | Qualified on | Previous appearances in Futsal Euro^{1} |
|---|---|---|---|
| Netherlands | Hosts | 24 September 2019 | 5 (1996, 1999, 2001, 2005, 2014) |
| Croatia | Group 1 winners | 9 March 2021 | 5 (1999, 2001, 2012, 2014, 2016) |
| Russia | Group 2 winners | 9 March 2021 | 11 (1996, **1999**, 2001, 2003, 2005, 2007, 2010, 2012, 2014, 2016, 2018) |
| Azerbaijan | Group 3 winners | 9 March 2021 | 5 (2010, 2012, 2014, 2016, 2018) |
| Bosnia and Herzegovina | Group 4 winners | 10 March 2021 | 0 (Debut) |
| Kazakhstan | Group 5 winners | 6 April 2021 | 2 (2016, 2018) |
| Spain | Group 6 winners | 9 March 2021 | 11 (**1996**, 1999, **2001**, 2003, **2005**, **2007**, **2010**, **2012**, 2014, **2016**, 2018) |
| Italy | Group 7 winners | 9 March 2021 | 11 (1996, 1999, 2001, **2003**, 2005, 2007, 2010, 2012, **2014**, 2016, 2018) |
| Portugal | Group 8 winners | 12 April 2021 | 9 (1999, 2003, 2005, 2007, 2010, 2012, 2014, 2016, **2018**) |
| Georgia | Among best six runners-up | 9 April 2021 | 0 (Debut) |
| Slovenia | Among best six runners-up | 12 April 2021 | 6 (2003, 2010, 2012, 2014, 2016, 2018) |
| Finland | Among best six runners-up | 13 April 2021 | 0 (Debut) |
| Slovakia | Among best six runners-up | 13 April 2021 | 0 (Debut) |
| Poland | Among best six runners-up | 14 April 2021 | 2 (2001, 2018) |
| Ukraine | Among best six runners-up | 16 April 2021 | 10 (1996, 2001, 2003, 2005, 2007, 2010, 2012, 2014, 2016, 2018) |
| Serbia | Play-off winners | 17 November 2021 | 6 (1999, 2007, 2010, 2012, 2016, 2018) |

^{1} Bold indicates champions for that year. Italic indicates hosts for that year.
