= 2024 FIFA Futsal World Cup qualification (UEFA) =

Tournament details
- Dates: 5 April 2022 – 17 April 2024
- Teams: 48 (from 1 confederation)

Tournament statistics
- Matches played: 179
- Goals scored: 1,001 (5.59 per match)
- Attendance: 11,283 (63 per match)
- Top scorer(s): (Armenia) Vladimir Sanosyan (13 goals)

The European qualifying competition for the 2024 FIFA Futsal World Cup was a men's futsal competition that determined the seven UEFA teams in the 2024 FIFA Futsal World Cup in Uzbekistan.

== Format ==
The qualifying competition consists of five stages:

- Preliminary round: The lowest-ranked 24 teams play in the preliminary round, and are drawn into six groups of four teams. The winners and runners-up of each group advance to the main round to join the 24 highest-ranked teams which receive byes to the main round.
- Main round: The 36 teams are drawn into twelve groups of three. The 12 winners and four best runners-up progress directly to the elite round. The remaining eight runners-up enter main round play-offs.
- Main round play-offs: The eight teams are drawn into four ties, to be played home and away. The four winners of the ties complete the elite round line-up.
- Elite round: The 20 teams are drawn into five groups of four. The winners of each group qualify directly for the World Cup, while the four best runners-up advance to the play-offs.
- Elite round play-offs: The four teams are drawn into two ties to play home-and-away two-legged matches to determine the last two European qualified teams. If only two teams enter, a draw will be held to determine the order of matches.

In the preliminary round each group is played as a round-robin mini-tournament at the pre-selected hosts.

In the main and the elite round, each team plays one home and one away match against each other team in its group.

=== Tiebreakers ===
In the preliminary round teams are ranked according to points (3 points for a win, 1 point for a draw, 0 points for a loss), and if tied on points, the following tiebreaking criteria are applied, in the order given, to determine the rankings (Regulations Articles 15.01 and 15.02):

1. Points in head-to-head matches among tied teams;
2. Goal difference in head-to-head matches among tied teams;
3. Goals scored in head-to-head matches among tied teams;
4. If more than two teams are tied, and after applying all head-to-head criteria above, a subset of teams are still tied, all head-to-head criteria above are reapplied exclusively to this subset of teams;
5. Goal difference in all group matches;
6. Goals scored in all group matches;
7. Penalty shoot-out if only two teams have the same number of points, and they met in the last round of the group and are tied after applying all criteria above (not used if more than two teams have the same number of points, or if their rankings are not relevant for qualification for the next stage);
8. Disciplinary points (red card = 3 points, yellow card = 1 point, expulsion for two yellow cards in one match = 3 points);
9. UEFA coefficient;

In the main and the elite round, teams are ranked according to points (3 points for a win, 1 point for a draw, 0 points for a loss), and if tied on points, the following tiebreaking criteria are applied, in the order given, to determine the rankings (Regulations Articles 15.01 and 15.02):

1. Points in head-to-head matches among tied teams;
2. Goal difference in head-to-head matches among tied teams;
3. Goals scored in head-to-head matches among tied teams;
4. If more than two teams are tied, and after applying all head-to-head criteria above, a subset of teams are still tied, all head-to-head criteria above are reapplied exclusively to this subset of teams;
5. Goal difference in all group matches;
6. Goals scored in all group matches;
7. Penalty shoot-out if only two teams have the same number of points, and they met in the last round of the group and are tied after applying all criteria above (not used if more than two teams have the same number of points, or if their rankings are not relevant for qualification for the next stage);
8. Away goals scored in all group matches;
9. Wins in all group matches;
10. Away wins in all group matches;
11. Disciplinary points (red card = 3 points, yellow card = 1 point, expulsion for two yellow cards in one match = 3 points);
12. UEFA coefficient used for the group phase draw;

In the play-offs, the team that scores more goals on aggregate over the two legs qualifies for the final tournament. As there is no away goals rule, if the aggregate score is level, an extra time of two 5-minute periods is played. If both teams score the same number of goals or no goals are scored during extra time, the tie is decided by penalty shoot-out (Regulations Article 16.01).

== Teams ==
The 48 teams were seeded according to the coefficient ranking. Seeded teams were determined based in November 2021 UEFA coefficient (shown in brackets). Six teams were pre-selected as hosts for the preliminary round. The draw for the preliminary round was held on 7 December 2021.

Teams entering main round	Teams entering preliminary round
Spain (1)	Moldova (25)
Russia (2)	Albania (26)
Portugal (3)	Turkey (27)
Kazakhstan (4)	Kosovo (28)
Azerbaijan (5)	Montenegro (29)
Ukraine (6)	Sweden (31)
Serbia (7)	Switzerland (32)
Italy (8)	Norway (33)
Slovenia (9)	Bulgaria (34)
Croatia (10)	Denmark (35)
Czech Republic (11)	Armenia (36)
Belarus (12)	Greece (37)
Romania (13)	Germany (38)
Hungary (14)	Cyprus (39)
France (15)	Lithuania (41)
Slovakia (16)	Israel (42)
Netherlands (17)	Andorra (43)
Bosnia and Herzegovina (18)	Estonia (44)
Poland (19)	Malta (45)
Belgium (20)	Gibraltar (46)
Finland (21)	San Marino (47)
Georgia (22)	Scotland (48)
Latvia (23)	Northern Ireland (49)
North Macedonia (24)	Austria (50)

Did not enter
England (30)	Wales (40)	Republic of Ireland (NR)	Iceland (NR)
Luxembourg (NR)	Faroe Islands (NR)	Liechtenstein (NR)	

Notes

- NR – No rank (Team has been inactive on the previous 36 months)

== Schedule ==
The qualifying matches are played on dates that fall within the FIFA Futsal International Match Calendar.

Schedule for 2024 FIFA Futsal World Cup European qualifying
Round	Draw	Dates
Preliminary round	7 December 2021	5–12 April 2022
Main round	7 July 2022	17 September 2022–8 March 2023
Main round play-offs	10 March 2023	10–19 April 2023
Elite round	5 July 2023	14–20 December 2023
Elite round play-offs	25 January 2024	8–17 April 2024

== Preliminary round ==
The winners and runners-up of each group advanced to the main round to join the 24 teams which receive byes. The preliminary round was scheduled to be played between 5–12 April 2022.

Times are CEST (UTC+2), as listed by UEFA (local times, if different, are in parentheses).

=== Group A ===
Pos	Team	Pld	W	D	L	GF	GA	GD	Pts	Qualification
1	Germany (H)	3	2	1	0	16	3	+13	7	Main round
2	Montenegro	3	2	1	0	9	3	+6	7	Main round
3	Gibraltar	3	1	0	2	2	14	−12	3	
4	San Marino	3	0	0	3	1	8	−7	0	

Source: UEFA
Rules for classification: Tiebreakers
(H) Hosts
6 April 2022
15:00

San Marino	0–1	Montenegro
	Report	Vuletic 22:32

CU Arena, Hamburg
Attendance: 46
Referee: Ugur Cakmak (Turkey)
6 April 2022
19:00

Germany	8–0	Gibraltar
Fortuna 1:24 (o.g.); Saglam 5:18, 16:32; Wittig 21:33; Meyer 26:14; Gecim 31:29; Matic 36:44; Garcia 37:56 (o.g.)	Report

CU Arena, Hamburg
Attendance: 331
Referee: Lars Van Leeuwen (Netherlands)

7 April 2022
15:00

Montenegro	5–0	Gibraltar
Vuletic 4:47, 35:43; Cimbaljevic 17:48; Obradović 34:18; Vukovic 39:13	Report

CU Arena, Hamburg
Attendance: 165
Referee: Ali Jabrayilov (Azerbaijan)
7 April 2022
19:00

San Marino	0–5	Germany
	Report	Meyer 5:04, 19:31; Sözer 12:59; Aghnima 28:52; Oliveira 30:41

CU Arena, Hamburg
Attendance: 321
Referee: Manuel Wolf (Austria)

9 April 2022
13:00

Gibraltar	2–1	San Marino
El Andaloussi 24:27, 35:05	Report	Busignani 10:31

CU Arena, Hamburg
Attendance: 20
Referee: Ugur Cakmak (Turkey)
9 April 2022
17:00

Montenegro	3–3	Germany
Milanovic 22:52; Spasojević 35:52; Vuletic 39:05	Report	Sözer 3:58; Meyer 10:56; Ak 13:11

CU Arena, Hamburg
Attendance: 604
Referee: Lars Van Leeuwen (Netherlands)

=== Group B ===
Pos	Team	Pld	W	D	L	GF	GA	GD	Pts	Qualification
1	Denmark	3	1	2	0	12	4	+8	5	Main round
2	Cyprus	3	1	2	0	7	6	+1	5	Main round
3	Norway (Note: Russia originally received a bye to the Main Round, but on 2 May 2022 UEFA banned all Russian clubs and teams from European competitions due to the invasion of Ukraine. Russia was replaced by Norway, which was the best third-ranked team of the preliminary round.) (H)	3	1	1	1	13	6	+7	4	Main round
4	Malta	3	0	1	2	3	19	−16	1	

Source: UEFA
Rules for classification: Tiebreakers
(H) Hosts
Notes:
6 April 2022
15:00

Denmark	8–0	Malta
Veis 8:43, 21:41, 30:41; Zammit 8:57 (o.g.); Jørgensen 19:07 (pen.); Rasmussen 33:39; Moussa 35:00	Report

Utleirahallen, Trondheim
Attendance: 100
Referee: Vlad Nicolae Ciobanu (Romania)
6 April 2022
20:00

Cyprus	3–2	Norway
El Kebbe 6:32; Tsitsos 21:04; Welo 26:10 (o.g.)	Report	Schjetne 8:44; Halvorsen 39:46

Utleirahallen, Trondheim
Attendance: 600
Referee: Daniele D'adamo (San Marino)

7 April 2022
15:00

Cyprus	2–2	Denmark
Kouloumbris 12:00, 12:41	Report	Veis 17:34; Rasmussen 32:34

Utleirahallen, Trondheim
Attendance: 50
Referee: Jacob Pawlowski (Germany)
7 April 2022
20:00

Norway	9–1	Malta
Andreassen 4:36; Eggen 6:14; Skinlo 14:26; Moen 17:02, 22:16, 39:34 (pen.); Vie 19:07, 23:53; Welo 22:32	Report	Sammut 7:03

Utleirahallen, Trondheim
Attendance: 200
Referee: Nebojsa Panic (Serbia)

9 April 2022
13:00

Malta	2–2	Cyprus
Sciortino 23:42; Sammut 25:25	Report	Kouloumbris 11:46; Skarparis 29:23

Utleirahallen, Trondheim
Attendance: 50
Referee: Daniele D'adamo (San Marino)
9 April 2022
18:00

Norway	2–2	Denmark
Vie 2:16; Økland 3:06	Report	Falck 5:28; Flyvholm 12:47

Utleirahallen, Trondheim
Attendance: 600
Referee: Vlad Nicolae Ciobanu (Romania)

=== Group C ===
Pos	Team	Pld	W	D	L	GF	GA	GD	Pts	Qualification
1	Armenia	3	3	0	0	16	1	+15	9	Main round
2	Kosovo	3	2	0	1	7	3	+4	6	Main round
3	Bulgaria (H)	3	1	0	2	9	7	+2	3	
4	Scotland	3	0	0	3	3	24	−21	0	

Source: UEFA
Rules for classification: Tiebreakers
(H) Hosts
8 April 2022
16:30 (17:30 EEST)

Armenia	11–0	Scotland
Rodriguinho 0:52, 25:47; Mashumyan 5:42; Sanosyan 9:07, 12:00; Vitinho 13:43; Galstyan 17:58; João Guilherme 25:00; Melkonyan 29:00; Margaryan 34:09; Aslanian 38:43	Report

Palace of Culture and Sports, Varna
Attendance: 30
Referee: Yiangos Yiangou (Cyprus)
8 April 2022
19:00 (20:00 EEST)

Bulgaria	0–2	Kosovo
	Report	Maxharraj 16:48; Salihu 26:17

Palace of Culture and Sports, Varna
Attendance: 500
Referee: Dario Pezzuto (Italy)

9 April 2022
16:30 (17:30 EEST)

Kosovo	4–1	Scotland
Maxharraj 2:41, 8:23, 35:11; Hajdini 27:04	Report	Steedman 13:25

Palace of Culture and Sports, Varna
Attendance: 50
Referee: Georgios Kazakos (Cyprus)
9 April 2022
19:00 (20:00 EEST)

Bulgaria	0–3	Armenia
	Report	João Guilherme 0:18; Aslanian 17:13; Sanosyan 38.47'

Palace of Culture and Sports, Varna
Attendance: 200
Referee: Šarūnas Tamulynas (Lithuania)

11 April 2022
16:30 (17:30 EEST)

Kosovo	1–2	Armenia
Kelmendi 19:20	Report	Kelmendi 1:03 (o.g.); Vitinho 7:08

Palace of Culture and Sports, Varna
Attendance: 55
Referee: Yiangos Yiangou (Cyprus)
11 April 2022
19:00 (20:00 EEST)

Scotland	2–9	Bulgaria
Robb 24:09; McLaren 25:52 (pen.)	Report	Dobrichov 7:51, 32:02; Baharov 11:15, 12:35; McLaren 22:01 (o.g.); Gerenski 23:08; Stoykov 25:15; Kuzmanov 36:49; Mihov 38:09

Palace of Culture and Sports, Varna
Attendance: 155
Referee: Šarūnas Tamulynas (Lithuania)

=== Group D ===
Pos	Team	Pld	W	D	L	GF	GA	GD	Pts	Qualification
1	Lithuania (H)	3	3	0	0	8	1	+7	9	Main round
2	Israel	3	1	1	1	5	6	−1	4	Main round
3	Turkey	3	1	0	2	9	10	−1	3	
4	Northern Ireland	3	0	1	2	7	12	−5	1	

Source: UEFA
Rules for classification: Tiebreakers
(H) Hosts
5 April 2022
15:00 (16:00 EEST)

Israel	3–3	Northern Ireland
T. Shkolnik 18:52; Jubran 33:34, 35:32	Report	Millar 3:28, 14:36, 24:08

Jonava Sports Arena, Jonava
Attendance: 50
Referee: Giulio Colombin (Italy)
5 April 2022
17:30 (18:30 EEST)

Lithuania	4–1	Turkey
Reimaris 1:29; Sendžikas 2:33; E. Baranauskas 10:46 (pen.); Ulberkis 18:51 (pen.)	Report	Cem Keskin 28:12

Jonava Sports Arena, Jonava
Attendance: 400
Referee: Filipe Gonçalo Santos Duarte (Portugal)

6 April 2022
15:00 (16:00 EEST)

Turkey	7–4	Northern Ireland
Eliaçık 0:50; Akparlak 12:06, 13:41; Aygün 16:02, 36:19; Ozkul 18:36; Cem Keskin 27:54	Report	Millar 7:10; Roohi 13:16; Stapleton 32:48, 38:00

Jonava Sports Arena, Jonava
Attendance: 30
Referee: Arlind Subashi (Albania)
6 April 2022
17:30 (18:30 EEST)

Lithuania	2–0	Israel
Zagurskas 8:12; E. Baranauskas 17:05	Report

Jonava Sports Arena, Jonava
Attendance: 350
Referee: Doroteja Mušič (Slovenia)

8 April 2022
15:00 (16:00 EEST)

Turkey	1–2	Israel
Altunay 36:08	Report	Halevi 28:47; Shkolnik 34:53

Jonava Sports Arena, Jonava
Attendance: 150
Referee: Giulio Colombin (Italy)
8 April 2022
17:30 (18:30 EEST)

Northern Ireland	0–2	Lithuania
	Report	Voskunovič 2:11; E. Baranauskas 2:43

Jonava Sports Arena, Jonava
Attendance: 550
Referee: Arlind Subashi (Albania)

=== Group E ===
Pos	Team	Pld	W	D	L	GF	GA	GD	Pts	Qualification
1	Sweden (H)	3	2	1	0	13	5	+8	7	Main round
2	Austria	3	1	1	1	7	10	−3	4	Main round
3	Albania	3	1	0	2	5	9	−4	3 (Note: Head-to-head points: Albania 3, Andorra 0.)	
4	Andorra	3	1	0	2	9	10	−1	3	

Source: UEFA
Rules for classification: Tiebreakers
(H) Hosts
Notes:
9 April 2022
13:00

Andorra	2–3	Albania
Dos Santos 26:12; Regalo Figueiredo 36:47	Report	Kaca 12:00 (pen.); Shkodra 30:40; A. Brahimi 37:43

Brinova Arena, Karlskrona
Attendance: 122
Referee: Rastislav Behancin (Slovakia)
9 April 2022
17:00

Sweden	3–3	Austria
Hiseni 14:14; Azizi 18:24; Cirak 18:52	Report	Meitz 4:13, 28:59; Kreka 6:06

Brinova Arena, Karlskrona
Attendance: 779
Referee: Tomasz Frak (Poland)

10 April 2022
13:00

Albania	2–3	Austria
S. Brahimi 5:49; A. Brahimi 22:46	Report	Meitz 13:42; Milenkovic 32:25; Flögel 39:46

Brinova Arena, Karlskrona
Attendance: 179
Referee: Yasin Alageyik (Belgium)
10 April 2022
17:00

Andorra	2–6	Sweden
Castro 0:50; Dos Santos 5:03	Report	Bejan 19:11; Azizi 22:56; Smajlovic 23:04, 25:04; Zhubi 28:42; Söderqvist 36:51

Brinova Arena, Karlskrona
Attendance: 823
Referee: Mislav Džeko (Croatia)

12 April 2022
15:00

Austria	1–5	Andorra
Jatic 22:04	Report	Castro 2:49; Regalo Figueiredo 17:15, 26:24; Mesquita 38:20; Rodriguez Sierra 39:29

Brinova Arena, Karlskrona
Attendance: 73
Referee: Yasin Alageyik (Belgium)
12 April 2022
19:00

Albania	0–4	Sweden
	Report	Gashi 6:34; Zhubi 20:22; Kaca 22:55; Marrah 26:26

Brinova Arena, Karlskrona
Attendance: 1,102
Referee: Mislav Džeko (Croatia)

=== Group F ===
Pos	Team	Pld	W	D	L	GF	GA	GD	Pts	Qualification
1	Moldova (H)	3	3	0	0	8	2	+6	9	Main round
2	Greece	3	2	0	1	11	5	+6	6	Main round
3	Switzerland	3	1	0	2	11	12	−1	3	
4	Estonia	3	0	0	3	5	16	−11	0	

Source: UEFA
Rules for classification: Tiebreakers
(H) Hosts
6 April 2022
15:00 (16:00 EEST)

Greece	5–2	Estonia
Ntatis 4:28; Manos 6:09; Tsinas 11:47; Karambelas 21:21, 30:03	Report	Vnukov 6:18; Laas 17:50

FMF Futsal Arena, Ciorescu
Attendance: 40
Referee: Dejan Veselic (Slovenia)
6 April 2022
18:00 (19:00 EEST)

Switzerland	1–4	Moldova
Marcoyannakis 3:04	Report	Tacot 19:45; Obadă 22:05; Niţa 22:27; A. Negara 25:46 (pen.)

FMF Futsal Arena, Ciorescu
Attendance: 700
Referee: Juan Boelen (Belgium)

7 April 2022
15:00 (16:00 EEST)

Switzerland	1–5	Greece
Gössi 18:20	Report	Karavidas 6:25, 38:38; Floros 11:05; Karydas 13:32; Tsinas 16:48

FMF Futsal Arena, Ciorescu
Attendance: 15
Referee: Nicolas Nicolaou (Cyprus)
7 April 2022
18:00 (19:00 EEST)

Moldova	2–0	Estonia
Laşcu 12:40; A. Negara 17:37	Report

FMF Futsal Arena, Ciorescu
Attendance: 800
Referee: Maximilian Alkofer (Germany)

9 April 2022
15:00 (16:00 EEST)

Estonia	3–9	Switzerland
Savikink 13:14; Vnukov 31:52, 34:43	Report	Florin 2:51; Qerfozi 5:35, 12:12; Spiegel 8:07; Marcoyannakis 22:54, 29:58; Naal 28:21 (o.g.); Gössi 32:52; Pulkkinen 35:46 (o.g.)

FMF Futsal Arena, Ciorescu
Attendance: 43
Referee: Juan Boelen (Belgium)
9 April 2022
18:00 (19:00 EEST)

Moldova	2–1	Greece
Obadă 18:40; Tacot 19:57	Report	Ntatis 39:40

FMF Futsal Arena, Ciorescu
Attendance: 1,000
Referee: Dejan Veselic (Slovenia)

== Main round ==
The winners and four best runners-up advanced to the elite round. The remaining eight runners-up enter main round play-offs. The matches of the main round must be completed by 8 March 2023. The draw for the main round was held on 7 July 2022.

Teams that received a bye to this round

- Spain
- ~~Russia~~
- Portugal
- Kazakhstan
- Azerbaijan
- Ukraine
- Serbia
- Italy
- Slovenia
- Croatia
- Czech Republic
- Belarus
- Romania
- Hungary
- France
- Slovakia
- Netherlands
- Bosnia and Herzegovina
- Poland
- Belgium
- Finland
- Georgia
- Latvia
- North Macedonia

Teams qualified from the preliminary round

Group	Winners	Runners-up	Best third-ranked
A	Germany	Montenegro	
B	Denmark	Cyprus	Norway
C	Armenia	Kosovo	
D	Lithuania	Israel	
E	Sweden	Austria	
F	Moldova	Greece	

1. Russia originally received a bye to the Main Round, but on 2 May 2022 UEFA banned all Russian clubs and teams from European competitions due to the invasion of Ukraine. Russia was replaced by Norway, which was the best third-ranked team of the preliminary round.

Times are CEST (UTC+2) and CET (UTC+1), as listed by UEFA (local times, if different, are in parentheses).

=== Group 1 ===
Pos	Team	Pld	W	D	L	GF	GA	GD	Pts	Qualification
1	Spain	4	4	0	0	35	2	+33	12	Elite round
2	Moldova	4	2	0	2	11	12	−1	6	Main round play-offs
3	Cyprus	4	0	0	4	1	33	−32	0	

Source: UEFA
Rules for classification: Tiebreakers
8 October 2022
17:00 (18:00 EEST)

Moldova	7–1	Cyprus
Tacot 03:59; Cojocaru 07:08; Laşcu 13:01; Obadă 28:29, 37:19; Negara 31:24; Timpeu 38:21	Report	Skarparis 38:29

FMF Futsal Arena, Ciorescu
Attendance: 400
Referee: Lukáš Peško (Slovakia)

11 October 2022
20:30

Spain	7–2	Moldova
Lozano 02:57, 34:49; Chino 07:39; Adolfo 12:23; Pol 24:04; Boyis 32:32; Raúl Campos 39:58	Report	Obadă 06:44; Tacot 32:32

Sport Hall of Alcázar, Alcázar de San Juan
Attendance: 1,487
Referee: Cédric Pelissier (France)

8 November 2022
18:00 (19:00 EET)

Cyprus	0–11	Spain
	Report	Raya 04:06; González 09:57; Mellado 12:21, 34:17; Campos 13:05; Cecilio 15:45; Adolfo 21:28; Kanjo 28:41 (o.g.); Chino 28:57; Solano 29:40, 39:17

Eleftheria Indoor Hall, Nicosia
Attendance: 214
Referee: Denys Kutsyi (Ukraine)

1 March 2023
18:30

Spain	13–0	Cyprus
Lozano 02:30, 17:10 (pen.); Adolfo 07:13; Chino 13:29; Gómez 19:23, 26:58; Skarparis 21:57 (o.g.); Campos 24:32, 35:40; González 28:14; Mellado 30:55; Ramirez Conzález 31:34; Mínguez Rubio 39:35	Report

Multiusos Ciudad de Cáceres, Cáceres
Attendance: 3,500
Referee: Damian Grabowski (Poland)

5 March 2023
11:00 (12:00 EET)

Cyprus	0–2	Moldova
	Report	Laşcu 15:22; Obadă 20:42

Eleftheria Indoor Hall, Nicosia
Referee: Marjan Mladenovski (North Macedonia)

8 March 2023
17:30 (18:30 EET)

Moldova	0–4	Spain
	Report	Ramirez Conzález 4:25, 5:49, 35:11; Jiménez Sánchez 10:03

FMF Futsal Arena, Ciorescu
Referee: David Grøndal Nissen (Denmark)

=== Group 2 ===
Pos	Team	Pld	W	D	L	GF	GA	GD	Pts	Qualification
1	Georgia	4	4	0	0	23	12	+11	12	Elite round
2	Belgium	4	2	0	2	23	12	+11	6	Main round play-offs
3	Austria	4	0	0	4	7	29	−22	0	

Source: UEFA
Rules for classification: Tiebreakers
5 October 2022
20:00

Belgium	11–0	Austria
El Fakiri 04:40, 11:47; Rahou 08:19, 26:00; Dahbi Reda 10:58; Gréllo 15:50; Rajkovic 28:37 (o.g.); Yachou 29:44; Ah. Sababti 35:17; Dillien 36:11, 37:56	Report

Belleheide, Roosdaal
Attendance: 351
Referee: Grigori Ošomkov (Estonia)

8 October 2022
17:00 (19:00 GET)

Georgia	4–2	Belgium
Bynho 19:19; Fernando 24:58; Roninho 26:10; Thales 38:47	Report	Rahou 22:00; El Fakiri 36:44

Olympic Palace, Tbilisi
Attendance: 1,138
Referee: Josip Barton (North Macedonia)

12 October 2022
19:00

Austria	2–6	Georgia
Vukovic 16:09; Bicer 27:59	Report	Todua 8:44; Fernando 11:01, 26:19, 33:28; Vilian 12:05; Sebiskveradze 39:47

Sporthalle Margareten, Vienna
Attendance: 300
Referee: Stephen Vella (Malta)

9 November 2022
16:00 (19:00 GET)

Georgia	6–4	Austria
Petry Branco 5:46, 16:54, 17:18, 39:22; Thales 29:27, 34:55 (pen.)	Report	Flögel 7:59, 23:57; Bicer 15:50; Mrsic 22:18

Tbilisi Sports Palace, Tbilisi
Attendance: 1,500
Referee: Lukáš Peško (Slovakia)

4 March 2023
19:00

Austria	1–6	Belgium
Skrgić 0:46	Report	Dillien 1:21; Dahbi Reda 18:52; Ah. Sababti 32:57, 36:52; Adnane 38:38; Rahou 38:50

Sporthalle Simmering, Vienna
Attendance: 270
Referee: George Jansizian (Sweden)

7 March 2023
19:30

Belgium	4–7	Georgia
Rahou 0:43; El Fakiri 4:41; Ah. Sababti 19:18; Ghislandi 37:46	Report	Bruno Gomes 4:24, 5:37; Petry Branco 15:28; Thales 19:54, 27:05; Ghavtadze 21:35; Saiotti 37:01

Belleheide, Roosdaal
Referee: Juan José Cordero Gallardo (Spain)

=== Group 3 ===
Pos	Team	Pld	W	D	L	GF	GA	GD	Pts	Qualification
1	Armenia	4	4	0	0	15	8	+7	12	Elite round
2	Czech Republic	4	2	0	2	12	11	+1	6	Main round play-offs
3	Bosnia and Herzegovina	4	0	0	4	8	16	−8	0	

Source: UEFA
Rules for classification: Tiebreakers
17 September 2022
18:00

Bosnia and Herzegovina	3–4	Armenia
Arnautović 00:38; Khromykh 05:11 (o.g.); Milanović 36:11	Report	Muller 07:09; Khromykh 24:19; Rozenski 35:40; Melkonyan 39:33

Arena "Husejin Smajlović", Zenica
Attendance: 410
Referee: Stefan Vrijens (Belgium)

20 September 2022
19:00

Czech Republic	4–2	Bosnia and Herzegovina
Černy 09:00; Seldler 24:35; D. Drozd 25:49; Záruba 34:00	Report	Gosto 15:41; Aladžić 33:05

Mêstská sportovni hala Vodova, Brno
Attendance: 925
Referee: Nicola Manzione (Italy)

8 October 2022
16:00

Armenia	4–2	Czech Republic
Muller 9:46; Khromykh 24:31, 28:13, 39:57	Report	Křivánek 3:11; P. Drozd 38:25

Karen Demirchyan Complex, Yerevan
Attendance: 2,000
Referee: Michael Christofides (Cyprus)

12 October 2022
17:30

Czech Republic	1–4	Armenia
Rešetár 28:50	Report	Sanosyan 11:37, 20:39, 22:31; Melkonyan 37:41

TJ Lokomotiva Plzeň, Plzeň
Attendance: 713
Referee: Vasilios Christodoulis (Greece)

3 March 2023
16:00

Armenia	3–2	Bosnia and Herzegovina
Sanosyan 8:44, 16:08; Melkonyan 26:19	Report	S. Ivanković 16:28; Jelić 30:43

Karen Demirchyan Complex, Yerevan
Attendance: 1,800
Referee: Aleš Mocnik Peric (Slovenia)

8 March 2023
18:00

Bosnia and Herzegovina	1–5	Czech Republic
Gašpar 4:55	Report	Vnuk 9:32; Holý 12:39; Seidler 31:06; P. Drozd 31:20; Rešetár 38:37

Sports Hall East Sarajevo, Sarajevo
Referee: Chiara Perona (Italy)

=== Group 4 ===
Pos	Team	Pld	W	D	L	GF	GA	GD	Pts	Qualification
1	Portugal	4	4	0	0	17	5	+12	12	Elite round
2	Lithuania	4	1	1	2	4	11	−7	4	Main round play-offs
3	Belarus	4	0	1	3	8	13	−5	1	

Source: UEFA
Rules for classification: Tiebreakers
6 October 2022
21:00

Portugal	5–3	Belarus
Erick 12:26; João Matos 33:00; Zicky 34:05; Pany Varela 35:30; Neves 38:18	Report	Semianiuk 06:17; Zugenak 07:35; Los 39:57

Pavilhão Multiusos de Paredes, Paredes
Attendance: 1,200
Referee: Juan José Cordero Gallardo (Spain)

11 October 2022
18:00

Lithuania	0–6	Portugal
	Report	Zicky 07:04, 24:20; Neves 10:21; Pany Varela 11:08; Tiago Brito 39:57; Derendiajev 21:18 (og)

Žalgiris Arena, Kaunas
Attendance: 1,258
Referee: Nikola Jelić (Croatia)

9 November 2022
21:30

Portugal	2–0	Lithuania
Erick 13:57; Pauleta 33:24	Report

Pavilhão Municipal Professor Joaquim Vairinhos, Loulé
Attendance: 1,556
Referee: Tomasz Frak (Poland)

2 March 2023
16:00

Lithuania	2–1	Belarus
Sipavičius 14:51; Baranauskas 15:54	Report	Marveyenko 11:34

FFA Technical Center Academy, Yerevan (Note: At first, Lithuanian Federation refused to play against Belarus due to the country's involvement in the Russian invasion of Ukraine. However, after FIFA threatened with disciplinary actions, the Lithuanian Federation requested UEFA their home match against Belarus to be played at a neutral venue. The decision means that both home and away matches will be played in Armenia.)
Attendance: 0
Referee: Ondřej Černý (Czech Republic)

4 March 2023
12:00

Belarus	2–2	Lithuania
Shvedko 20:34; Los 32:22	Report	Voskunovič 7:21; Derendiajev 36:34

FFA Technical Center Academy, Yerevan (Note: Due to the country's involvement in the Russian invasion of Ukraine, Belarusian teams were required to play their home matches at neutral venues and behind closed doors until further notice.)
Attendance: 0
Referee: Gábor Kovács (Hungary)

7 March 2023
15:00

Belarus	2–4	Portugal
Zuyenak 22:07; Shimanovski 27:41	Report	Erick 1:37; Bruno Coelho 19:16; Fábio Cecílio 28:13; Zicky 29:06

FFA Technical Center Academy, Yerevan
Attendance: 0
Referee: Cédric Pelissier (France)

=== Group 5 ===
Pos	Team	Pld	W	D	L	GF	GA	GD	Pts	Qualification
1	Kazakhstan	4	3	1	0	17	4	+13	10	Elite round
2	Slovenia	4	2	1	1	10	7	+3	7	Elite round
3	Montenegro	4	0	0	4	3	19	−16	0	

Source: UEFA
Rules for classification: Tiebreakers
20 September 2022
20:00

Slovenia	3–1	Montenegro
Osredkar 01:23; Čeh 29:46; Totošković 31:15	Report	Obradović 16:28

Dobrana Tabor, Maribor
Referee: Damian Grabowski (Poland)

8 October 2022
14:00

Kazakhstan	2–0	Slovenia
Akbalikov 6:12; Douglas Júnior 35:41	Report

Jekpe-Jek Hall, Astana
Referee: Kamil Çetin (Turkey)

12 October 2022
18:00

Montenegro	1–5	Kazakhstan
Marković 16:48	Report	Leo 10:04; Edson 18:27; Knaub 28:04; Akbalikov 28:21; Taynan 37:12

Verde Complex, Podgorica
Referee: Ibrahim El Jilali (Netherlands)

9 November 2022
15:00

Kazakhstan	7–0	Montenegro
Douglas Júnior 1:40; Abdumanapuly 3:00; Knaub 14:28; Akbalikov 20:35; Orazov 24:09, 24:21; Valiullin 39:07	Report

Baluan Sholak Sports Palace, Almaty
Referee: Maximilian Alkofer (Germany)

3 March 2023
18:00

Montenegro	1–4	Slovenia
Kostić 28:22	Report	Turk 2:03; Suban 11:53; Duščak 24:53; Čeh 37:18 (pen.)

Verde Complex, Podgorica
Referee: Alejandro Martinez Flores (Spain)

8 March 2023
18:00

Slovenia	3–3	Kazakhstan
Čeh 8:44; Osredkar 23:55; Turk 25:27	Report	Akbalikov 5:03; Tursagulov 14:11; Taynan 19:47

Tabor Hall, Maribor
Referee: Marc Birkett (England)

=== Group 6 ===
Pos	Team	Pld	W	D	L	GF	GA	GD	Pts	Qualification
1	Poland	4	3	0	1	17	7	+10	9 (Note: Head-to-head goal difference: Poland +4, Azerbaijan −4.)	Elite round
2	Azerbaijan	4	3	0	1	18	12	+6	9	Elite round
3	Greece	4	0	0	4	3	19	−16	0	

Source: UEFA
Rules for classification: Tiebreakers
Notes:
19 September 2022
18:00

Poland	3–0	Greece
Mrowiec 16:10; Zastawnik 16:37; Spychalski 24:10	Report

Municipal Hall, Jastrzębie-Zdrój
Referee: Giulio Colombin (Italy)

7 October 2022
18:00

Azerbaijan	4–3	Poland
Baghirov 9:59; Vilela 16:38 23:06; Bolinha 33:31	Report	Mrowiec 6:06; Leszczak 24:24; Surmiak 26:39

Baku Sports Palace, Baku
Referee: Aslan Galayev (Kazakhstan)

11 October 2022
17:00

Greece	0–7	Azerbaijan
	Report	Vilela 1:43; Baghirov 5:00, 15:17; Gallo 17:32, 24:28; Bolinha 36:27; Felipinho 39:52

Korydallos Sports Hall, Athens
Referee: Ademir Avdic (Sweden)

9 November 2022
17:00

Greece	1–4	Poland
Manos 28:45 (pen.)	Report	Kriezel 11:09, 38:01; Marek 14:40; Surmiak 39:33

Korydallos Sports Hall, Athens
Referee: Kirill Naishouler (Finland)

3 March 2023
17:00

Azerbaijan	5–2	Greece
Eduardo 2:23; Ensi 8:28 (o.g.); Vilela 11:24; Felipinho 20:57; Amadeu 31:20	Report	Ensi 23:47; Ntatis 26:27

Baku Sports Palace, Baku
Referee: Eduardo Fernandes Coelho (Portugal)

7 March 2023
20:00

Poland	7–2	Azerbaijan
Zastawnik 3:48, 27:05, 27:35, 30:05, 32:44; Raszkowski 3:54; Kriezel 31:57	Report	Atayev 23:09; Amadeu 28:00

Sports Hall, Koszalin
Referee: Grigori Ošomkov (Estonia)

=== Group 7 ===
Pos	Team	Pld	W	D	L	GF	GA	GD	Pts	Qualification
1	Croatia	4	3	1	0	19	3	+16	10	Elite round
2	Hungary	4	1	2	1	10	9	+1	5	Main round play-offs
3	Israel	4	0	1	3	4	21	−17	1	

Source: UEFA
Rules for classification: Tiebreakers
19 September 2022
20:00

Hungary	2–2	Israel
Tatal 09:49; Rábl 14:34	Report	Dávid 17:19 (o.g.); Ben Aharon 32:53

Savaria Arena, Szombathely
Referee: Jan Kresta (Czech Republic)

7 October 2022
19:00

Croatia	5–1	Hungary
Sekulić 9:41; Čekol 11:43; Jelavić 15:43; Jurlina 16:31; Kuraja 24:21	Report	Harnisch 15:58

Dvorana Vijuš, Slavonski Brod
Referee: Miguel Castilho (Portugal)

12 October 2022
15:00

Israel	0–7	Croatia
	Report	Jelavić 8:35, 17:24, 22:04; Perić 9:56; Jurlina 18:40; Sekulić 34:16; Kuraja 35:16

Maccabi House, Rishon LeZion
Referee: Maximilian Alkofer (Germany)

8 November 2022
19:00

Croatia	6–1	Israel
Perić 11:17, 24:56, 34:09; Mataja 14:24; Postružin 34:44; Vukmir 38:12	Report	Mužar 36:04 (o.g.)

Arena Varaždin, Varaždin
Referee: Vlad Nicolae Ciobanu (Romania)

2 March 2023
18:30

Israel	1–6	Hungary
Cohen 32:41	Report	Dávid 23:34, 28:46; Rábl 23:50; Hajmási 26:43; S.Horváth 36:24; Dróth 39:58

Rosemarine Hall, Petah Tikva
Referee: Yiangos Yiangou (Cyprus)

7 March 2023
18:15

Hungary	1–1	Croatia
Pál 30:21	Report	Perić 37:58

Fönix Arena, Debrecen
Referee: Talgat Kosmukhambetov (Kazakhstan)

=== Group 8 ===
Pos	Team	Pld	W	D	L	GF	GA	GD	Pts	Qualification
1	Romania	4	3	1	0	12	5	+7	10	Elite round
2	Finland	4	2	1	1	11	3	+8	7	Elite round
3	Denmark	4	0	0	4	5	20	−15	0	

Source: UEFA
Rules for classification: Tiebreakers
6 October 2022
17:30

Romania	5–1	Denmark
Hadnagy 09:12, 29:53, 36:59, 38:24; Felipe Oliveira 09:30 (pen.)	Report	Falck 07:41

City Hall Arena, Târgu Mureș
Referee: Hikmat Qafarli (Azerbaijan)

11 October 2022
17:10

Finland	1–2	Romania
Korpela 24:37 (pen.)	Report	Sasse 21:45; Daniel Araujo 29:37

Energia Areena, Vantaa
Referee: Daniel Matkovic (Switzerland)

8 November 2022
18:00

Denmark	0–6	Finland
	Report	Kylmälä 5:10; Kunnas 10:06, 17:04; J. Kytölä 18:03; Lintula 23:39; Pikkarainen 25:27

Ceres Arena, Aarhus
Referee: Marjan Mladenovski (North Macedonia)

1 March 2023
18:00

Romania	0–0	Finland
	Report

Rapid-Valentin Stanescu Hall, Bucharest
Referee: Kamil Çetin (Turkey)

5 March 2023
13:00

Denmark	3–5	Romania
Jørgensen 2:21; Truelsen 13:32, 26:37	Report	Sasse 2:03, 4:55, 27:31; Hadnagy 8:50; Iszlai 31:28

Broager Sparekasse Skansen, Sønderborg
Referee: Lars Van Leeuwen (Netherlands)

8 March 2023
17:10

Finland	4–1	Denmark
Vanha 3:26, 25:07; Hosio 13:31; Pikkarainen 35:26	Report	Sorensen 38:30

Energia Areena, Vantaa
Referee: Dominykas Norkus (Lithuania)

=== Group 9 ===
Pos	Team	Pld	W	D	L	GF	GA	GD	Pts	Qualification
1	France	4	3	1	0	14	2	+12	10	Elite round
2	Serbia	4	2	1	1	9	5	+4	7	Elite round
3	Norway	4	0	0	4	5	21	−16	0	

Source: UEFA
Rules for classification: Tiebreakers
5 October 2022
18:00

Norway	2–4	Serbia
Eggen 8:22; Welo 33:34	Report	Rosić 5:19, 37:21; Rakić 23:39; Lazarević 36:30

Grorud Flerbrukshus, Oslo
Referee: Vlad Nicolas Ciobanu (Romania)

8 October 2022
21:15

France	9–1	Norway
A. Mohammed 1:02, 39:25; Bendal 4:41, 22:58; Toure 11:44, 22:09, 28:50; M. Toure 34:46; Mouhoudine 38:29	Report	Andreassen 39:27 (pen.)

Espace Mayenne, Laval
Referee: Gábor Kovács (Hungary)

12 October 2022
19:00

Serbia	0–0	France
	Report

Zorka Šabac Sports Hall, Šabac
Referee: Moshe Bohbot (Israel)

9 November 2022
18:00

Serbia	5–1	Norway
Tomić 9:19; Lazarević 14:57; Marinković 18:44; Rosić 29:58; Moen 31:21 (o.g.)	Report	Eggen 31:26

Sports Hall, Požarevac
Referee: Aslan Galayev (Kazakhstan)

2 March 2023
19:00

Norway	1–3	France
Ramirez 3:48 (o.g.)	Report	Benslama 6:25; Ramirez 31:06; Rakvaag 34:27 (o.g.)

Rødtindhallen, Tromsø
Referee: Denys Kutsyi (Ukraine)

7 March 2023
21:00

France	2–0	Serbia
A. Mohammed 15:15; Mouhoudine 26:48	Report

Espace Mayenne, Laval
Referee: Eduardo Fernandes Coelho (Portugal)

=== Group 10 ===
Pos	Team	Pld	W	D	L	GF	GA	GD	Pts	Qualification
1	Italy	4	2	2	0	22	14	+8	8	Elite round
2	Sweden	4	1	1	2	14	18	−4	4 (Note: Head-to-head goal difference: Sweden +1, North Macedonia −1.)	Main round play-offs
3	North Macedonia	4	1	1	2	11	15	−4	4	

Source: UEFA
Rules for classification: Tiebreakers
Notes:
7 October 2022
17:00

Sweden	5–2	North Macedonia
Smajlovic 16:23; Gashi 26:42, 33:18, 38:18; Atai Najafi 31:18	Report	Petrović 1:05; Micevski 28:38

Estrad Alingsås, Alingsås
Referee: Petar Radojcic (Serbia)

12 October 2022
19:00

North Macedonia	3–3	Italy
Ramadani 17:49; Petrović 35:45; Krstevski 39:57	Report	Motta 10:38, 34:06; Lo Cicero 16:09

SC Jane Sandanski, Skopje
Referee: Denys Kutsyi (Ukraine)

9 November 2022
20:00

Italy	6–1	Sweden
Musumeci 7:54; Motta 13:26 (pen.), 23:39; Isgrò 16:25; Marcelinho 28:07; Calderolli 38:21	Report	Söderqvist 39:55

Palajacazzi, Aversa
Referee: Daniel Matkovic (Switzerland)

1 March 2023
20:30

Italy	6–3	North Macedonia
Cutrupi 2:43; Musumeci 7:27; Marcelinho 16:02, 23:35; Motta 25:17; Calderolli 36:21	Report	Krstevski 5:34; Petrović 10:57; Rangotov 21:36

PalaCatania, Catania
Referee: Stefan Vrijens (Belgium)

5 March 2023
19:00

North Macedonia	3–1	Sweden
Rangotov 20:30, 25:36; Leovski 38:12	Report	Diaz 29:03

SC Jane Sandanski, Skopje
Referee: Trayan Enchev (Bulgaria)

8 March 2023
18:30

Sweden	7–7	Italy
Gashi 2:57, 37:46; Söderqvist 6:33, 16:14 (pen.), 19:30; Diaz 22:49; Hiseni 24:32	Report	Marcelinho 14:06, 39:49; Musumeci 18:21, 20:35; Jansson 24:22 (o.g.); Isgrò 30:05, 36:11

Gavlehovshallen, Gävle
Referee: Petar Radojcic (Serbia)

=== Group 11 ===
Pos	Team	Pld	W	D	L	GF	GA	GD	Pts	Qualification
1	Ukraine	4	3	1	0	13	6	+7	10	Elite round
2	Netherlands	4	1	2	1	8	9	−1	5	Main round play-offs
3	Kosovo	4	0	1	3	7	13	−6	1	

Source: UEFA
Rules for classification: Tiebreakers
18 September 2022
19:00

Netherlands	2–1	Kosovo
Dahmani 34:23; Ben Khalou 35:22	Report	Rukovci 39:11

Topsportcentrum, Rotterdam
Referee: Kirill Naishouler (Finland)

7 October 2022
18:00

Ukraine	3–1	Kosovo
Cherniavskyi 14:19; Korsun 23:57; Melnyk 26:24	Report	Kastrati 1:21

Salaspils sporta nams, Salaspils (Latvia)
Referee: Šarūnas Tamulynas (Lithuania)

11 October 2022
18:00

Ukraine	4–2	Netherlands
Shoturma 5:21; Korsun 9:12, 39:53; Abakshyn 11:15	Report	Bouzambou 13:06, 13:33

Zemgales Olympic Centre, Jelgava (Latvia)
Referee: Viktor Bugenko (Moldova)

9 November 2022
17:00

Kosovo	2–5	Ukraine
Maxharraj 16:48; Salihu 33:31	Report	Cherniavskyi 5:28; Siryi 8:17; Mykytiuk 27:26; Fareniuk 30:55; Lebid 33:06

Pallati i Rinise, Pristina
Referee: Admir Zahovi (Slovenia)

3 March 2023
17:00

Kosovo	3–3	Netherlands
Dervishaj 8:35, 28:52; Alaj 32:17	Report	Ben Khalou 30:54; Bouyouzan 38:24; Bouzit 38:51

Pallati i Rinise, Pristina
Referee: Nicola Manzione (Italy)

8 March 2023
20:00

Netherlands	1–1	Ukraine
Boukhari 19:52	Report	Shoturma 9:41

Topsportcentrum, Almere
Referee: Nikola Jelić (Croatia)

=== Group 12 ===
Pos	Team	Pld	W	D	L	GF	GA	GD	Pts	Qualification
1	Slovakia	4	2	2	0	8	2	+6	8	Elite round
2	Germany	4	1	2	1	5	7	−2	5	Main round play-offs
3	Latvia	4	1	0	3	7	11	−4	3	

Source: UEFA
Rules for classification: Tiebreakers
5 October 2022
18:30

Latvia	5–1	Germany
Baklanovs 03:01, 09:16, 16:52, 18:33; Mik.Babris 11:17	Report	Wittig 38:51

Zemgales Olympic Centre, Jelgava
Attendance: 548
Referee: Admir Zahovič (Slovenia)

8 October 2022
20:00

Slovakia	3–0	Latvia
Rick 10:18; Doša 22:18; Ševčík 23:07	Report

Športová hala Arena, Lučenec
Attendance: 1000
Referee: Marc Birkett (England)

12 October 2022
18:00

Germany	1–1	Slovakia
Karpiak 28:06 (o.g.)	Report	Doša 26:26

BallsportARENA, Dresden
Attendance: 1124
Referee: David Grøndal Nissen (Denmark)

9 November 2022
18:00

Slovakia	0–0	Germany
	Report

Športová hala Levice, Levice
Attendance: 750
Referee: Hikmat Qafarli (Azerbaijan)

3 March 2023
19:00

Germany	3–1	Latvia
Sözer 3:02, 31:13; Wittig 5:40	Report	Mik. Babris 24:51

Stadthalle Bielefeld, Bielefeld
Referee: Vlad Nicolae Ciobanu (Romania)

8 March 2023
18:30

Latvia	1–4	Slovakia
Baklanovs 37:05	Report	Drahovský 6:38; Zaťovič 33:16; Doša 35:52, 38:00

Zemgales Olympic Centre, Jelgava
Referee: Daniel Matkovic (Switzerland)

=== Ranking of second-placed teams ===
Pos	Grp	Team	Pld	W	D	L	GF	GA	GD	Pts	Qualification
1	6	Azerbaijan	4	3	0	1	18	12	+6	9	Elite round
2	8	Finland	4	2	1	1	11	3	+8	7	Elite round
3	9	Serbia	4	2	1	1	9	5	+4	7	Elite round
4	5	Slovenia	4	2	1	1	10	7	+3	7	Elite round
5	2	Belgium	4	2	0	2	23	12	+11	6	Main round play-offs
6	3	Czech Republic	4	2	0	2	12	11	+1	6	Main round play-offs
7	1	Moldova	4	2	0	2	11	12	−1	6	Main round play-offs
8	7	Hungary	4	1	2	1	10	9	+1	5	Main round play-offs
9	11	Netherlands	4	1	2	1	8	9	−1	5	Main round play-offs
10	12	Germany	4	1	2	1	5	7	−2	5	Main round play-offs
11	10	Sweden	4	1	1	2	14	18	−4	4	Main round play-offs
12	4	Lithuania	4	1	1	2	4	11	−7	4	Main round play-offs

Rules for classification: 1) points; 2) goal difference; 3) goals scored; 4) away goals scored; 5) wins; 6) away wins; 7) disciplinary points; 8) coefficient ranking.

== Main round play-offs ==
The winner of each tie advanced to the Elite round. The matches were played on 12–19 April 2023.

The draw for the main round play-offs was held on 10 March 2023.

Team 1	Agg.	Team 2	1st leg	2nd leg
Belgium	5–5 (4–3 p)	Hungary	2–1	3–4 (a.e.t.)
Netherlands	11–3	Moldova	5–2	6–1
Sweden	4–8	Germany	2–4	2–4
Czech Republic	7–3	Lithuania	5–2	2–1

Times are CET (UTC+1), as listed by UEFA (local times, if different, are in parentheses).

12 April 2023
19:30

Belgium	2–1	Hungary
Ghislandi 06:00; Rahou 33:30	Report	Dróth 11:53

Belleheide, Roosdaal
Referee: Juan José Cordero Gallardo (Spain)
17 April 2023
18:00

Hungary	4–3 (a.e.t.)	Belgium
Pál 15:34; Rahou 17:49 (o.g.); Dróth 36:17; Hajmási 45:28	Report	Ah. Sababti 8:42; Rahou 9:53, 47:09
Penalties
Vas (penalty scored); ? (penalty missed); Nagy (penalty scored); Hajmási (penalty missed); Rábl (penalty scored)	3–4	(penalty scored) Gréllo; (penalty missed) Ah. Sababti; (penalty scored) Ghislandi; (penalty scored) Rahou; (penalty scored) El Fakiri

Pálffy István Rendezvénycsarnok, Berettyóújfalu
Referee: Cristiano Santos (Portugal)

15 April 2023
22:00

Netherlands	5–2	Moldova
Dahmani 13:30, 17:55; Boukhari 22:11; Bouzit 33:50; Ben Khalou 39:49	Report	Obadă 0:10, 8:27

Topsportcentrum Almere, Almere
Referee: Cédric Pelissier (France)
19 April 2023
17:30

Moldova	1–6	Netherlands
Pasaribu 36:44 (o.g.)	Report	Velseboer 19:48; Bouyouzan 21:29; Bouzit 28:59, 33:49; Bouzambou 30:37; Van Houtum 35:27

FMF Futsal Arena, Ciorescu
Referee: Aleš Mocnik Peric (Slovenia)

14 April 2023
18:30

Sweden	2–4	Germany
Azizi 5:29; Smajlovic 35:36 (pen.)	Report	Ak 3:05, 13:34; Drees Rodriguez 21:46; Meyer 29:25

Gavlehovshallen, Gävle
Referee: Gábor Kovács (Hungary)
18 April 2023
19:00

Germany	4–2	Sweden
Drees Rodriguez 19:16, 35:24; Sözer 23:04, 39:00	Report	Kadivar 19:40, 29:13

EWS Arena, Göppingen
Referee: Marc Birkett (England)

14 April 2023
19:30

Czech Republic	5–2	Lithuania
Seidler 3:19; Rešetár 3:48; P. Drozd 10:11, 34:58; Vokoun 25:08	Report	Derendiajev 12:01; Baranauskas 35:54

Městská sportovní hala Vodova, Brno
Referee: Nikola Jelić (Croatia)
18 April 2023
18:00

Lithuania	1–2	Czech Republic
Samsonik 13:06	Report	P. Drozd 11:49; Seidler 25:16

Kėdainiai Arena, Kėdainiai
Referee: Nicola Manzione (Italy)

== Elite round ==
The draw for the elite round was held on 8 June 2023, with matches to be completed by 20 December 2023. The five group winners qualified to the 2024 FIFA Futsal World Cup. The four best runners-up entered the elite round play-offs.

Teams qualified from the main round and the main round play-offs

Group	Winners	Four best runners-up	Play-off winners
1	Spain		
2	Georgia		Belgium
3	Armenia		Czech Republic
4	Portugal		
5	Kazakhstan	Slovenia	
6	Poland	Azerbaijan	
7	Croatia		
8	Romania	Finland	
9	France	Serbia	
10	Italy		
11	Ukraine		Netherlands
12	Slovakia		Germany

Times are CEST (UTC+2) and CET (UTC+1), as listed by UEFA (local times, if different, are in parentheses).

=== Group A ===
Pos	Team	Pld	W	D	L	GF	GA	GD	Pts	Qualification
1	Kazakhstan	6	6	0	0	17	7	+10	18	Final tournament
2	Netherlands	6	3	0	3	14	10	+4	9	Elite round play-offs
3	Romania	6	2	0	4	11	17	−6	6	
4	Azerbaijan	6	1	0	5	11	19	−8	3	

Source: UEFA
Rules for classification: Tiebreakers
15 September 2023
17:30

Romania	3–1	Azerbaijan
Hadnagy 15:23; Sasse 32:37, 33:13	Report	Felipinho 26:56

Sala Sporturilor Romeo Iamandi, Buzău
Referee: Admir Zahovič (Slovenia)
15 September 2023
20:00

Netherlands	0–2	Kazakhstan
	Report	Edson 2:42; Tursagulov 27:51

Topsportcentrum, Almere
Referee: Nicola Manzione (Italy)

20 September 2023
16:00

Kazakhstan	4–3	Romania
Douglas Junior 1:48; Akbalikov 10:47; Edson 15:01; Orazov 19:23	Report	Manya 3:19, 35:32; Sasse 31:42

Baluan Sholak Sports Palace, Almaty
Referee: Lukáš Peško (Slovakia)
20 September 2023
16:30

Azerbaijan	6–1	Netherlands
Vilela 1:19, 18:21; Gallo 7:47; Maneca 14:35; Felipinho 17:04, 35:45	Report	Bouzit 36:58

Baku Sports Palace, Baku
Referee: Yiangos Yiangou (Cyprus)

6 October 2023
17:30

Romania	0–5 (awarded)	Netherlands
Ferreira 6:31; Valaderes 39:43	Report	Bouzambou 25:30

Pitești Arena, Pitești
Referee: Chiara Perona (Italy)

Matches declared forfeited for the violation of Article 38 of the Regulations of the UEFA European Qualifying Competition for the 2024 FIFA Futsal World Cup (player eligibility) by Romania

6 October 2023
18:00

Azerbaijan	2–4	Kazakhstan
Ahmadi 11:36; Maneca 39:55	Report	Orazov 22:25; Biel 26:02 (o.g.); Tursagulov 35:31; Leo 38:49

Baku Sports Palace, Baku
Referee: Kirill Naishouler (Finland)

10 October 2023
20:00

Netherlands	5–0 (awarded)	Romania
Ceyar 26:04	Report	Ben Khalou 32:17 (o.g.)

Topsportcentrum, Almere
Referee: Grigori Ošomkov (Estonia)

Matches declared forfeited for the violation of Article 38 of the Regulations of the UEFA European Qualifying Competition for the 2024 FIFA Futsal World Cup (player eligibility) by Romania

11 October 2023
16:00

Kazakhstan	3–2	Azerbaijan
Leo 12:32; Orazov 17:16; Douglas Junior 21:33	Report	Amadeu 3:05; Gallo 7:59

Jekpe-Jek Hall, Astana
Referee: Trayan Enchev (Bulgaria)

14 December 2023
16:30

Kazakhstan	2–0	Netherlands
Orazov 0:22; Douglas Junior 6:03	Report

Jekpe-Jek Hall, Astana
Referee: Admir Zanovič (Slovenia)
15 December 2023
17:00

Azerbaijan	0–5 (awarded)	Romania
Vilela 17:11, 18:20, 24:59; Mikayilov 31:48; Shojaei 33:40	Report	Nastai 21:05; Balint 27:49, 34:14; Daniel Araujo 31:28 (pen.); Netaminu 35:46

Baku Sports Palace, Baku
Referee: Damian Grabowski (Poland)

Match declared forfeited for the violation of Article 38 of the Regulations of the UEFA European Qualifying Competition for the 2024 FIFA Futsal World Cup (player eligibility) by Azerbaijan

20 December 2023
18:00

Romania	0–2	Kazakhstan
	Report	Yesenamanov 7:51; Orazov 25:57

Rapid-Valentin Stanescu Hall, Bucharest
Referee: David Glavonjic (Sweden)
20 December 2023
18:30

Netherlands	3–0	Azerbaijan
Attahiri 0:54; Bouzambou 9:43; Ceyar 37:23	Report

Topsportcentrum, Almere
Referee: Dominykas Norkus (Lithuania)

=== Group B ===
Pos	Team	Pld	W	D	L	GF	GA	GD	Pts	Qualification
1	Ukraine	6	4	1	1	32	12	+20	13	Final tournament
2	Poland	6	4	0	2	21	14	+7	12	Elite round play-offs
3	Serbia	6	2	2	2	13	17	−4	8	
4	Belgium	6	0	1	5	12	35	−23	1	

Source: UEFA
Rules for classification: Tiebreakers
15 September 2023
18:00

Poland	1–2	Serbia
Lutecki 20:45	Report	Matijević 6:41; Petrov 11:33

HWS Koszalin, Koszalin
Referee: Talgat Kosmukhambetov (Kazakhstan)
15 September 2023
20:00

Belgium	2–10	Ukraine
El Fakiri 11:43, 35:16	Report	Shoturma 0:11; Pediash 9:09, 23:00; Shved 9:16; Melnyk 12:39; Abakshyn 13:36, 18:27, 19:36; Korsun 25:16; Fareniuk 38:36

Belleheide Sport Center, Roosdaal
Referee: Besar Beqiri (Kosovo)

20 September 2023
18:00

Ukraine	2–3	Poland
Korsun 10:02; Pediash 12:04	Report	Kriezel 12:49; Tsypun 19:31 (o.g.); Marek 33:09

Pálfi István Rendezvénycsarnok, Berettyóújfalu
Referee: Nikola Jelić (Croatia)
20 September 2023
18:00

Serbia	3–3	Belgium
Lazarević 5:05, 13:58; Petrov 34:45	Report	Ah. Sababti 10:10; Ghislandi 16:44, 38:38

Sportska Hala Smederevo, Smederevo
Referee: Hikmat Qafarli (Azerbaijan)

6 October 2023
17:00

Poland	7–2	Belgium
Gréllo 8:59 (o.g.); Mrowiec 11:22; Kaniewski 18:43; Zastawnik 19:49, 38:38; Dochez 32:52 (o.g.); Kriezel 37:28	Report	Adnane 14:04; Ghislandi 36:52

Municipal Sports Centre, Mielec
Referee: Vedran Babic (Croatia)
6 October 2023
18:00

Serbia	1–6	Ukraine
Vasic 10:03	Report	Shved 0:18, 8:47; Abakshyn 7:30, 30:35; Zhuk 8:30; Korsun 24:04

Sportska hala Vranje, Vranje
Referee: Lars van Leeuwen (Netherlands)

11 October 2023
18:00

Ukraine	1–1	Serbia
Zhuk 25:17	Report	Petrov 16:00

Pálfi István Rendezvénycsarnok, Berettyóújfalu
Referee: David Grøndal Nissen (Denmark)
11 October 2023
20:00

Belgium	1–3	Poland
Rahou 36:47	Report	Mrowiec 18:23; Marek 34:04; Vrancken 37:02 (o.g.)

Belleheide Sport Center, Roosdaal
Referee: Vasilios Christodoulis (Greece)

15 December 2023
18:00

Serbia	2–4	Poland
Petrov 3:31; Tomić 13:50	Report	Madziąg 18:55, 22:50; Marek 28:52; Zastawnik 37:17

Crystal Hall, Zrenjanin
Referee: Kamil Çetin (Turkey)
15 December 2023
18:00

Ukraine	8–2	Belgium
Korsun 2:30, 8:52, 14:38; Pediash 4:22, 26:32; Shoturma 19:35; Siryi 27:28; Fareniuk 39:59	Report	Quadi 28:25; Rahou 35:28

Pálfi István Rendezvénycsarnok, Berettyóújfalu
Referee: Gábor Kovács (Hungary)

20 December 2023
18:30

Poland	3–5	Ukraine
Kaniewski 26:28, 29:15; Raszkowski 36:16	Report	Abakshyn 6:18; Shoturma 8:37; Korsun 11:50, 19:03; Semenchenko 31:11

Atlas Arena, Łódź
Referee: Juan José Cordero Gallardo (Spain)
20 December 2023
18:30

Belgium	2–4	Serbia
Ghislandi 17:11; Gréllo 38:20	Report	Tomić 2:55; Petrov 17:44; Vasic 18:32, 34:56

Belleheide Sport Center, Roosdaal
Referee: Ondřej Černý (Czech Republic)

=== Group C ===
Pos	Team	Pld	W	D	L	GF	GA	GD	Pts	Qualification
1	France	6	5	1	0	27	11	+16	16	Final tournament
2	Croatia	6	4	0	2	20	10	+10	12	Elite round play-offs
3	Slovakia	6	1	1	4	14	26	−12	4	
4	Germany	6	1	0	5	11	25	−14	3	

Source: UEFA
Rules for classification: Tiebreakers
16 September 2023
17:20

Slovakia	4–4	France
Drahovský 6:34, 38:38; A. Mohammed 11:38 (o.g.); Bačo 38:45	Report	A. Mohammed 8:44; Toure 11:26; Mouhoudine 33:09, 37:35

Športová Hala Levice, Levice
Referee: Filip Nesnera (Czech Republic)
16 September 2023
18:30

Germany	1–5	Croatia
Rodriguez 13:36	Report	Sekulić 12:42; Postružin 14:31; Kustura 18:05; Jelovčić 20:25; Perić 37:27

Richard-Hartmann-Halle, Chemnitz
Referee: Stefan Vrijens (Belgium)

20 September 2023
19:00

Croatia	4–0	Slovakia
Sekulić 6:18, 11:09; Kuraja 10:08; Kustura 18:33	Report

Mate Parlov Sport Centre, Pula
Referee: Denys Kutsyi (Ukraine)
20 September 2023
21:05

France	6–2	Germany
Mouhoudine 10:47; Guirio 10:59; A. Mohammed 19:55, 21:37; Belhaj 22:53; Menendez 30:03	Report	Rodriguez 5:22; Sözer 28:40 (p)

Espace Mayenne, Laval
Referee: Cristiano Santos (Portugal)

5 October 2023
18:30

Germany	4–3	Slovakia
Wittig 15:27, 31:40, 38:32; Sözer 26:52	Report	Zaťovič 5:04; Drahovský 26:29', 34:02'

EWS Arena, Göppingen
Referee: Ingus Puriņš (Latvia)
5 October 2023
21:05

France	5–2	Croatia
Belhaj 11:20; Saadaoui 31:47; A. Mohammed 33:57, 39:23; Bendali 35:58	Report	Jelovčić 21:31; Sekulić 26:12

Espace Mayenne, Laval
Referee: David Urdánoz Apezteguía (Spain)

9 October 2023
18:30

Slovakia	4–3	Germany
Belaník 10:50; Čeřovský 17:45; Drahovský 22:05; Kušnír 38:55	Report	Sözer 35:59 (pen.), 36:45 (pen.), 39:13 (pen.)

Športová Hala Levice, Levice
Referee: Marjan Mladenovski (North Macedonia)
10 October 2023
19:00

Croatia	1–2	France
Sekulić 2:43	Report	Toure 23:39; Mouhoudine 39:59

Sports Hall Dom Sportova, Zagreb
Referee: Telmen Undrakh (Norway)

14 December 2023
21:05

France	7–1	Slovakia
A. Mohammed 0:41; Belhaj 5:42; Čeřovský 10:29 (o.g.); Korček 11:07 (o.g.); Mouhoudine 15:54, 25:28; Saadaoui 31:25	Report	Korček 23:28

Espace Mayenne, Laval
Referee: Besar Beqiri (Kosovo)
15 December 2023
20:00

Croatia	4–0	Germany
Perić 2:25; Sekulić 19:14; Postružin 21:05; Vukmir 30:23	Report

Dvorana Vijuš, Slavonski Brod
Referee: Cristiano Santos (Portugal)

20 December 2023
18:30

Slovakia	2–4	Croatia
Zaťovič 6:02; Směřička 11:12	Report	Vukmir 0:48; Čekol 1:38; Marinović 3:31; Perić 18:51

Športová hala Levice, Levice
Referee: Nicola Manzione (Italy)
20 December 2023
18:30

Germany	1–3	France
Ak 10:01	Report	Mouhoudine 1:26; Belhaj 5:07; Toure 39:42

BallsportARENA, Dresden
Referee: Denys Kutsyi (Ukraine)

=== Group D ===
Pos	Team	Pld	W	D	L	GF	GA	GD	Pts	Qualification
1	Spain	6	5	1	0	20	2	+18	16	Final tournament
2	Italy	6	2	1	3	14	18	−4	7 (Note: Tied on head-to-head and total goal difference. Total goals scored: Italy 14, Slovenia 10.)	
3	Slovenia	6	2	1	3	10	14	−4	7	
4	Czech Republic	6	1	1	4	13	23	−10	4	

Source: UEFA
Rules for classification: Tiebreakers
Notes:
15 September 2023
19:00

Czech Republic	0–3	Spain
	Report	Koudelka 21:48 (o.g.); Mellado 22:13; Adolfo 34:03

UNYP Arena, Prague
Referee: Cédric Pelissier (France)
15 September 2023
20:00

Italy	3–1	Slovenia
Merlim 32:15, 35:35; Cutrupi 35:03	Report	Fideršek 37:16

PalaSele, Eboli
Referee: Marc Birkett (England)

19 September 2023
18:45

Slovenia	2–1	Czech Republic
Vesel 16:14; Turk 21:26	Report	Seidler 19:02

Tabor Hall, Maribor
Referee: Gábor Kovács (Hungary)
20 September 2023
21:00

Spain	1–0	Italy
Campos 36:06	Report

Polideportivo de Aguas Vivas, Guadalajara
Referee: Kamil Çetin (Turkey)

6 October 2023
20:00

Italy	6–5	Czech Republic
Calderolli 7:45, 17:08, 39:50; Motta 9:01, 36:41; Isgrò 16:30	Report	P. Drozd 2:24; Slováček 5:22; Záruba 10:57, 36:06; Vnuk 27:03

PalaErcole, Policoro
Referee: Christiano Santos (Portugal)
6 October 2023
20:15

Slovenia	1–1	Spain
Čop 31:06	Report	Adolfo 8:45

Tivoli Hall, Ljubljana
Referee: Victor Chaix (France)

10 October 2023
20:00

Spain	4–0	Slovenia
Antonio Pérez 20:52, 35:09; Velasco 27:09; Adolfo 30:16	Report

Olivo Arena, Jaén
Referee: Gábor Kovács (Hungary)
11 October 2023
19:10

Czech Republic	3–3	Italy
P. Drozd 19:25; Vnuk 32:56; Rešetár 37:31	Report	Motta 18:04; Marcelo 35:44, 39:12

TJ Lokomotiva Plzeň, Plzeň
Referee: Petar Radojcic (Serbia)

15 December 2023
18:30

Slovenia	4–2	Italy
Bukovec 6:47, 13:28; Čeh 25:54; Osredkar 38:42	Report	Musumeci 1:54; Marcelo 26:56

Tivoli Hall, Ljubljana
Referee: Cédric Pelissier (France)
15 December 2023
20:30

Spain	7–1	Czech Republic
Ramirez Conzález 8:44; Juan Emilio 14:46; Boyis 23:21; Antonio Pérez 26:01; Gómez 32:16; Francisco Paniagua 39:10; Francisco Tomaz 39:35	Report	Vnuk 31:27

Pabellón Polideportivo Universitario, Albacete
Referee: Vlad Nicolae Ciobanu (Romania)

20 December 2023
18:30

Italy	0–4	Spain
	Report	Boyis 0:55; Juan Emilio 28:46; Antonio Pérez 37:05; Gómez 39:10

Palacattani, Faenza
Referee: Nikola Jelić (Croatia)
20 December 2023
18:30

Czech Republic	3–2	Slovenia
Slováček 17:50; D. Drozd 28:00; Vnuk 38:07	Report	Bukovec 10:51; Janež 36:46

TJ Lokomotiva Plzeň, Plzeň
Referee: Vasilios Christodoulis (Greece)

=== Group E ===
Pos	Team	Pld	W	D	L	GF	GA	GD	Pts	Qualification
1	Portugal	6	6	0	0	32	2	+30	18	Final tournament
2	Finland	6	4	0	2	21	10	+11	12	Elite round play-offs
3	Armenia	6	1	0	5	5	25	−20	3 (Note: Head-to-head goal difference: Armenia +1, Georgia −1.)	
4	Georgia	6	1	0	5	3	24	−21	3	

Source: UEFA
Rules for classification: Tiebreakers
Notes:
15 September 2023
18:00

Georgia	2–1	Armenia
Todua 9:32; Bruno Gomes 18:18	Report	Zanotto 33:38

Tbilisi Sports Palace, Tbilisi
Referee: Volha Pauliuts (Belarus)
16 September 2023
17:10

Finland	1–5	Portugal
Vanha 39:47	Report	André Coelho 18:12 (pen.), 32:12; Pauleta 26:16; Fábio Cecílio 35:47; Pany Varela 38:51

Energia Areena, Vantaa
Referee: Damian Grabowski (Poland)

20 September 2023
17:00

Armenia	0–5 (awarded)	Finland
Zanotto 6:53; Paradynski 21:08	Report	Hosio 8:00; Khromykh 16:29 (o.g.); Alamikkotervo 39:31

Karen Demirchyan Complex, Yerevan
Referee: Daniel Matkovic (Switzerland)
20 September 2023
22:30

Portugal	5–0 (awarded)	Georgia
Tomás Paçó 1:00; Pauleta 6:00; Tiago Brito 12:06; Bruno Coelho 19:59	Report	Ghavtadze 23:59; Vilian 26:57

Pavilhão Cidade de Viseu, Viseu
Referee: Juan Cordero (Spain)

Matches declared forfeited for the violation of Article 38 of the Regulations of the UEFA European Qualifying Competition for the 2024 FIFA Futsal World Cup (player eligibility) by Armenia and Georgia

6 October 2023
17:00

Armenia	0–5 (awarded)	Portugal
Sanosyan 10:26, 37:30, 38:42; João Guilherme 16:39, 39:17	Report	Tiago Brito 10:51; Tomás Paçó 16:09, 16:51; Varela 17:11, 22:24; Pauleta 25:44

Karen Demirchyan Complex, Yerevan
Referee: Bogdan Hanceariuc (Romania)
7 October 2023
17:00

Georgia	0–5 (awarded)	Finland
Saiotti 8:45; Vanha 15:34 (o.g); Bynho 20:56, 35:00; Kupatadze 37:29	Report	Kunnas 32:31; T. Intala 39:31

Tbilisi Sports Palace, Tbilisi
Referee: Dominykas Norkus (Lithuania)

Matches declared forfeited for the violation of Article 38 of the Regulations of the UEFA European Qualifying Competition for the 2024 FIFA Futsal World Cup (player eligibility) by Georgia

11 October 2023
17:10

Finland	5–0 (awarded)	Georgia
Kunnas 0:54; Pikkarainen 6:09; Alamikkotervo 38:24	Report	Bruno Gomes 1:12; Kupatadze 9:12; Chaguinha 29:57

Kupittaa Sports Hall, Turku
Referee: David Glavonjic (Sweden)

Matches declared forfeited for the violation of Article 38 of the Regulations of the UEFA European Qualifying Competition for the 2024 FIFA Futsal World Cup (player eligibility) by Georgia

11 October 2023
22:00

Portugal	7–1	Armenia
Varela 3:11; Afonso Jesus 7:31; Zicky 7:48, 31:17; Neves 16:53; Tomás Paçó 24:49; Kutchy 29:58	Report	Sanosyan 1:30

Pavilhão da Póvoa, Póvoa de Varzim
Referee: Farik Keco (Bosnia and Herzegovina)

15 December 2023
17:00

Armenia	3–1	Georgia
Mashumyan 5:45; Sanosyan 25:43; Rodriguinho 37:09	Report	Ghavtadze 8:47

Karen Demirchyan Complex, Yerevan
Referee: Eduards Fatkulins (Latvia)
15 December 2023
20:30

Portugal	5–0	Finland
Varela 3:46; Tiago Brito 10:06; Bruno Coelho 13:05; Matos 30:45; Pauleta 36:31	Report

Pavilhão Multidesportos Dr. Mário Mexia, Coimbra
Referee: Telmen Undrakh (Norway)

20 December 2023
17:00

Georgia	0–5 (awarded)	Portugal
Chimba 32:43; Ghavtadze 38:48	Report	Neves 21:51

Tbilisi Sports Palace, Tbilisi
Referee: Stefan Vrijens (Belgium)
20 December 2023
18:30

Finland	5–0 (awarded)	Armenia
	Report

Energia Areena, Vantaa

Finland won by forfeit

=== Ranking of second-placed teams ===
Pos	Grp	Team	Pld	W	D	L	GF	GA	GD	Pts	Qualification
1	E	Finland	6	4	0	2	21	10	+11	12	Elite round play-offs
2	C	Croatia	6	4	0	2	20	10	+10	12	Elite round play-offs
3	B	Poland	6	4	0	2	21	14	+7	12	Elite round play-offs
4	A	Netherlands	6	3	0	3	14	10	+4	9	Elite round play-offs
5	D	Italy	6	2	1	3	14	18	−4	7	

Rules for classification: 1) points; 2) goal difference; 3) goals scored; 4) away goals scored; 5) wins; 6) away wins; 7) disciplinary points; 8) coefficient ranking.

== Elite round play-offs ==
The draw for the elite round play-offs was held on 25 January 2024. The matches will be played on 8–17 April 2024.

The winner of each tie will qualify to the 2024 FIFA Futsal World Cup.

Teams that enter the play-offs

- Croatia
- Finland
- Netherlands
- Poland

Team 1	Agg.	Team 2	1st leg	2nd leg
Netherlands	5–5 (5–4 p)	Finland	1–1	4–4
Poland	4–5	Croatia	2–3	2–2

13 April 2024
18:00

Netherlands	1–1	Finland
Cretier 37:02	Report	Jaakko Alasuutari 16:11

Topsportcentrum, Almere
Referee: Nicola Manzione (Italy)
17 April 2024
16:30

Finland	4–4 (a.e.t.)	Netherlands
Kunnas 27:09; Lintula 33:42; Vanha 34:42, 49:59	Report	Martinus 16:15, 26:55; Boukhari 39:54; Ouaddouh 46:43
Penalties
Korpela (penalty scored); Kangas (penalty scored); Kunnas (penalty missed); Alamikkotervo (penalty scored); Vanha (penalty scored)	4–5	(penalty scored) Ben Khalou; (penalty scored) Mossaoui; (penalty scored) Bouyouzan; (penalty scored) Belhaj; (penalty scored) Ouaddouh

Energia Areena, Vantaa
Referee: Juan José Cordero Gallardo (Spain)

12 April 2024
17:00

Poland	2–3	Croatia
Szadurski 2:12; Kuraja 14:57 (o.g.)	Report	Perić 13:05, 33:54; Mataja 34:17

Sports Hall, Koszalin
Referee: Eduardo Fernandes Coelho (Portugal)
16 April 2024
18:00

Croatia	2–2	Poland
Marinović 15:37; Kaniewski 29:23 (og)	Report	Skiepko 33:59; Kubik 39:13

KC Dražen Petrovic, Zagreb
Referee: Ondřej Černý (Czechia)

== Qualified teams for FIFA Futsal World Cup ==
The following seven teams from UEFA qualified for the 2024 FIFA Futsal World Cup.

Team	Qualified as	Qualified on	Previous appearances in FIFA Futsal World Cup^{1}
Kazakhstan	Elite round Group A winners	14 December 2023	3 (2000, 2016, 2021)
France	Elite round Group C winners	14 December 2023	0 (debut)
Spain	Elite round Group D winners	15 December 2023	9 (1989, 1992, 1996, **2000**, **2004**, 2008, 2012, 2016, 2021)
Portugal	Elite round Group E winners	15 December 2023	6 (2000, 2004, 2008, 2012, 2016, **2021**)
Ukraine	Elite round Group B winners	20 December 2023	5 (1996, 2004, 2008, 2012, 2016)
Croatia	Elite round play-offs winners	16 April 2024	1 (2000)
Netherlands	Elite round play-offs winners	17 April 2024	4 (1989, 1992, 1996, 2000)

^{1} Bold indicates champions for that year. Italic indicates hosts for that year.

== Top goalscorers ==
- Preliminary round: There were 196 goals scored in 36 matches, for an average of 5.44 goals per match.
- Main round: There were 416 goals scored in 72 matches, for an average of 5.78 goals per match.
- Main round play-offs: There were 46 goals scored in 8 matches, for an average of 5.75 goals per match.
- Elite round: There were 324 goals scored in 59 matches, for an average of 5.49 goals per match.
- Elite round play-offs: There were 19 goals scored in 4 matches, for an average of 4.75 goals per match.
- Total: There were 1,001 goals scored in 179 matches, for an average of 5.59 goals per match.

> Team did not participate in this stage.
— Team eliminated for this stage.

Rank	Player	PR	MR	MRPO	ER	ERPO	Total
1	(Armenia) Vladimir Sanosyan	3	5	>	5	—	13
2	(Germany) Muhammet Sözer	2	2	2	5	—	11
2	(Ukraine) Ihor Korsun	>	3	>	8	>	11
4	(Belgium) Omar Rahou	>	5	3	2	—	10
4	(Croatia) Luka Perić	>	5	>	3	2	10
6	(Poland) Mikołaj Zastawnik	>	6	>	3	0	9
6	(Azerbaijan) Rafael Vilela	>	4	>	5	—	9
6	(France) Abdessamad Mohammed	>	3	>	6	>	9
6	(France) Souheil Mouhoudine	>	2	>	7	>	9
10	(Moldova) Cristian Obadă	2	4	2	—	—	8
10	(Italy) Gabriel Motta	>	5	>	3	—	8
10	(Croatia) Antonio Sekulić	>	2	>	6	0	8
13	(Romania) André Luis Sasse	>	4	>	3	—	7
13	(Czech Republic) Pavel Drozd	>	2	3	2	—	7
13	(Kazakhstan) Birzhan Orazov	>	2	>	5	>	7
13	(Portugal) Pany Varela	>	2	>	5	>	7
13	(Ukraine) Danyil Abakshyn	>	1	>	6	>	7
18	(Sweden) Donat Gashi	1	5	0	—	—	6
18	(Germany) Christopher Wittig	1	2	0	3	—	6
18	(Romania) István Hadnagy	>	5	>	1	—	6
18	(Belgium) Ahmed Sababti	>	4	1	1	—	6
18	(Belgium) Soufian El Fakiri	>	4	0	2	—	6
18	(Portugal) Zicky Té	>	4	>	2	>	6
18	(Spain) Adolfo	>	3	>	3	>	6
18	(Slovakia) Tomáš Drahovský	>	1	>	5	—	6
18	(Belgium) Marvin Ghislandi	>	1	0	5	—	6
