= Kosovo national futsal team results (2016–2019) =

This is a list of Kosovo national futsal team results from 2016 to 2019.

== History ==
=== After membership in UEFA and FIFA ===
Kosovo for the first time after joining UEFA and FIFA participated in the Futsal Week Tournament in which it was declared champion after three victories (against Finland; 3–1, twice against Turkey; 7–0 and 3–0) and one loss (against Finland; 5–6). Kosovo, after being declared champions in the Futsal Week Tournament, played two friendlies with Macedonia, which they lost with the results 2–6 (first match), and 2–5 (second match).

=== Participations at qualifications ===
==== UEFA Futsal Euro 2018 qualifying ====
On 21 October 2016, in Nyon, it was decided that Kosovo should be part in Group E of the UEFA Futsal Euro 2018 qualifying, together with Cyprus, Denmark and Norway. On 30 January 2017, Kosovo made his debut on UEFA Futsal Euro qualifying with a 1–5 away win against Norway that was simultaneously also the first-ever competitive win.

==== 2020 FIFA Futsal World Cup qualifications ====
On 12 December 2018, in Nyon, it was decided that Kosovo should be part in Group B of the 2020 FIFA Futsal World Cup qualification, together with Andorra, Belarus and Norway. On 30 January 2019, Kosovo made their debut on FIFA Futsal World Cup qualifications with a 5–0 away defeat against Belarus.

== Fixtures and results ==
=== 2016 ===
29 August Futsal Week Tournament	Finland	1–3	Kosovo	Zadar, Croatia
16:15		Report		Stadium: Krešimir Ćosić Hall

31 August Futsal Week Tournament	Kosovo	7–0	Turkey	Zadar, Croatia
18:15		Report		Stadium: Krešimir Ćosić Hall

2 September Futsal Week Tournament	Turkey	0–3	Kosovo	Zadar, Croatia
18:15		Report		Stadium: Krešimir Ćosić Hall

3 September Futsal Week Tournament	Kosovo	5–6	Finland	Zadar, Croatia
11:15		Report		Stadium: Krešimir Ćosić Hall

1 November Friendly	Kosovo	2–6	Macedonia	Pristina, Kosovo
17:00		Report		Stadium: Palace of Youth and Sports; Attendance: 300

2 November Friendly	Kosovo	2–5	Macedonia	Pristina, Kosovo
17:00		Report		Stadium: Palace of Youth and Sports

=== 2017 ===
30 January UEFA Futsal Euro 2018 qualifying	Norway	1–5	Kosovo	Nicosia, Cyprus
15:00	Maazouzi 19:16	Report	Goli 4:52, 39:28; Espegren 9:48 (o.g.); Gjinovci 17:11; Alaj 28:05	Stadium: Eleftheria Indoor Hall; Referee: Aleksandras Sliva (Lithuania)

31 January UEFA Futsal Euro 2018 qualifying	Cyprus	1–3	Kosovo	Nicosia, Cyprus
17:30	Kouloumbris 9:43	Report	Selimi 14:59; Goli 15:43; Qerimi 25:55	Stadium: Eleftheria Indoor Hall; Referee: Daniel Deca (Romania)

2 February UEFA Futsal Euro 2018 qualifying	Kosovo	1–2	Denmark	Nicosia, Cyprus
15:00	Dobroshi 7:47	Report	Mehlsen 29:08; Haagh 37:19	Stadium: Eleftheria Indoor Hall; Referee: Moshe Bohbot (Israel)

=== 2018 ===
3 March Adem Jashari Futsal Tournament semi-final	Kosovo	5–7	Albania	Pristina, Kosovo
13:30	Rukovci 1'; Goli 16', 38'; Alaj 22'; Dobroshi 35'	Report (FFK); Report (FSHF)	Mejzini 19'; Rexhepaj 20', 22', 38'; Alibegu 39'; Neziri 40'; Kaca 41'	Stadium: Palace of Youth and Sports

=== 2019 ===
30 January 2020 FIFA Futsal World Cup qualification	Belarus	5–0	Kosovo	Minsk, Belarus
18:30	Olshevski 6:41; Rukovci 8:27 (o.g.); Scherbich 10:16 (2pen.); Zhigalko 21:10; Goli 25:24 (o.g.)	Report		Stadium: SCA Sports Hall; Referee: Daniel Matković (Switzerland) and Eduards Fatkulins (Latvia)

31 January 2020 FIFA Futsal World Cup qualification	Kosovo	5–1	Norway	Minsk, Belarus
17:00	Rukovci 3:05; Alaj 18:58, 22:07, 34:35 (pen.); Topilla 37:20	Report	Wiseth 33:21	Stadium: SCA Sports Hall; Referee: Eduards Fatkulins (Latvia) and Victor Berg-Audic (France)

2 February 2020 FIFA Futsal World Cup qualification	Andorra	3–5	Kosovo	Minsk, Belarus
09:15	Rodríguez-Sierra 3:09; Pérez 35:11, 39:27	Report	Alaj 5:00, 28:20, 32:29 (pen.); Gjinovci 10:37; Topilla 24:25	Stadium: SCA Sports Hall; Referee: Eduards Fatkulins (Latvia) and Shota Kukhilava (Georgia)

24 October 2020 FIFA Futsal World Cup qualification	Ukraine	7–1	Kosovo	Skopje, North Macedonia
17:30	Fareniuk 11:53; Shoturma 17:20; Sorokin 22:41, 27:38, 32:08; Zvarych 24:36; Korolyshyn 33:10	Report	Rukovci 11:12	Stadium: Jane Sandanski Arena; Referee: Marc Birkett (England) and Julien Lang (France)

25 October 2020 FIFA Futsal World Cup qualification	North Macedonia	5–7	Kosovo	Skopje, North Macedonia
17:30	Krstevski 3:28; Ismaili 15:25; Ziberi 21:01; Agushi 25:45; Micevski 27:29	Report	Rukovci 1:35; Maxharraj 3:56; Alaj 12:04; Qerimi 19:58, 38:43; Prenqi 33:16; Topilla 39:16	Stadium: Jane Sandanski Arena; Referee: Daniel Matković (Switzerland) and Marc Birkett (England)

27 October 2020 FIFA Futsal World Cup qualification	Kosovo	1–7	Slovenia	Skopje, North Macedonia
20:00	Maxharraj 3:33	Report	Osredkar 18:38, 27:25; Čujec 23:00, 36:00; Mordej 25:23; Čeh 34:20 (2pen.); Turk 39:11	Stadium: Jane Sandanski Arena; Referee: Julien Lang (France) and Daniel Matković (Switzerland)

== Kosovo versus other countries ==
As of 27 October 2019
Head-to-head records are included only matches as FIFA member.

Opponent	Pld	W	D	L	GF	GA	GD	Win %
Albania	1	0	0	1	5	7	−2	0.00
Andorra	1	1	0	0	5	3	+2	100.00
Belarus	1	0	0	1	0	5	−5	0.00
Cyprus	1	1	0	0	3	1	+2	100.00
Denmark	1	0	0	1	1	2	−1	0.00
Finland	2	1	0	1	8	7	+1	50.00
North Macedonia	3	1	0	2	11	16	−5	33.33
Norway	2	2	0	0	10	2	+8	100.00
Slovenia	1	0	0	1	1	7	−6	0.00
Turkey	2	2	0	0	10	0	+10	100.00
Ukraine	1	0	0	1	1	7	−6	0.00
11 Countries	16	8	0	8	55	57	−2	50.00
