= Gréllo =

Belgian futsal player

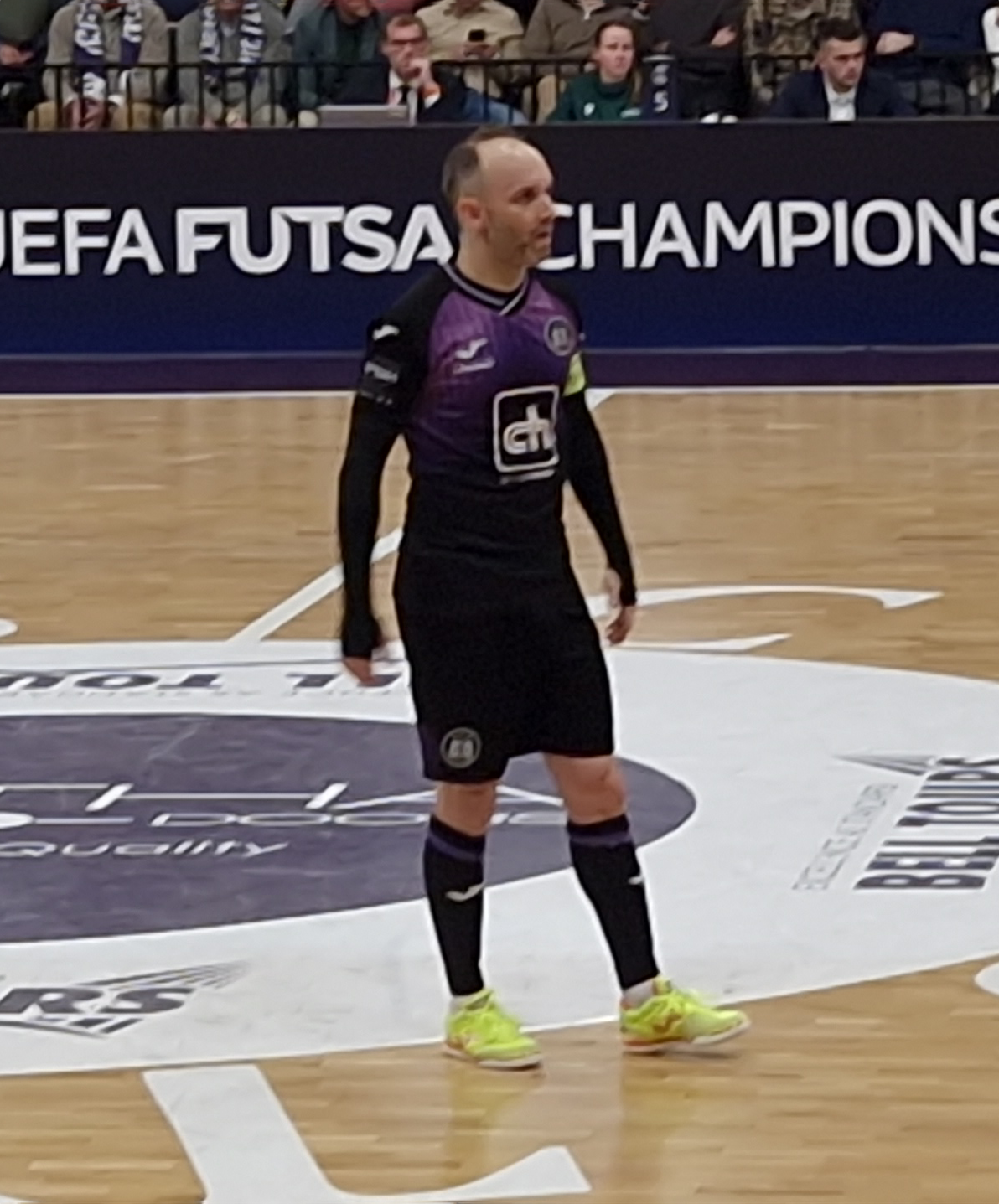
- Gréllo with RSCA Futsal during the 2025–26 Champions League

Personal information
- Full name: Gabriel Laranjeira d’Angelo
- Date of birth: 4 July 1985 (age 41)
- Place of birth: São Paulo, Brasil
- Position: Winger

Team information
- Current team: RSC Anderlecht Futsal

Senior career*
| Years | Team | Apps | (Gls) |
| 2004–2005 | São Paulo FC | | |
| 2005–2010 | Palma Futsal | | |
| 2010–2011 | Giti Pasand | | |
| 2011–2015 | ElPozo Murcia | | |
| 2015–2016 | Pescara Calcio a 5 | | |
| 2016– | Halle-Gooik/Anderlecht | | |

International career
| 2021– | Belgium | 36 | (11) |
- * Club domestic league appearances and goals

Gabriel "Gréllo" d'Angelo (born 4 July 1985), is a professional futsal player who plays for RSC Anderlecht Futsal. Born in Brazil, he plays the Belgian national futsal team.

In 2022–23, Gréllo was elected as best player in the Belgian Futsal Division 1 for the fifth time in his career, taking into account that the Golden-Boot trophy was not awarded during the COVID-19 years 2020 and 2021.

During the 2022–23 season, at the age of 38, Gréllo scored his 175th goal for Anderlecht, making him the all-time topscorer for the team.

== Honours ==
=== Club ===
São Paulo

- World College Championship: 2004

Palma Futsal

- Copa Illes Balears: 2005

ElPozo Murcia

- Supercopa de España: 2012, 2014

Pescara Calcio a 5

- Italian Cup: 2015–16
- Italian Super Cup: 2015

Halle-Gooik

- Belgian Futsal Division 1: 2016–17, 2017–18, 2018–19, 2021–22
- Belgian Cup: 2017–18, 2018–19, 2021–22
- Belgian Super Cup: 2016, 2017, 2018, 2019

Anderlecht

- Belgian Futsal Division 1: 2022–23, 2023–24, 2024–25
- Belgian Cup: 2022–23, 2023–24, 2024–25
- Belgian Super Cup: 2023, 2024

=== Individual ===
- Best College Player: 2004
- Belgian Futsal Golden Boot: 2017, 2018, 2019, 2022, 2023

== International goals ==
List of international goals scored by Gréllo..
| No. | Date | Venue | Opponent | Score | Result | Competition |
|---|---|---|---|---|---|---|
| 1. | 7 April 2022 | Gondomar, Portugal | Portugal | 2–1 | 3–2 | Friendly |
| 2. | 9 April 2022 | Santo Tirso, Portugal | Portugal | 2–4 | 3–4 | Friendly |
| 3. | 15 September 2022 | Poreč, Croatia | Saudi Arabia | 2–1 | 6–2 | Friendly |
| 4. | 5 October 2022 | Roosdaal, Belgium | Austria | 5–0 | 11–0 | 2024 FIFA Futsal World Cup qualification |
| 5. | 20 December 2023 | Roosdaal, Belgium | Serbia | 2–4 | 2–4 | 2024 FIFA Futsal World Cup qualification |
| 6. | 3 February 2024 | Caen, France | Netherlands | 1–0 | 6–4 | Friendly |
| 7. | 5 February 2025 | Roosdaal, Belgium | Serbia | 7–3 | 8–3 | UEFA Futsal Euro 2026 qualifying |
| 8. | 16 April 2025 | Graz, Austria | Austria | 2–0 | 2–0 | UEFA Futsal Euro 2026 qualifying |
| 9. | 15 January 2026 | Paris, France | France | 5–5 | 5–5 | Friendly |
| 10. | 26 January 2026 | Ljubljana, Slovenia | Slovenia | 1–0 | 4–5 | UEFA Futsal Euro 2026 |
| 11. | 28 January 2026 | Ljubljana, Slovenia | Spain | 1–2 | 3–10 | UEFA Futsal Euro 2026 |
