= Kosovo national futsal team =

Kosovo
- Nickname(s): Dardanët (Dardanians)
- Association: Football Federation of Kosovo (FFK)
- Confederation: UEFA (Europe)
- Head coach: Hector Souto
- Asst coach: Fazli Berisha
- Captain: Jeton Rukovci
- Home stadium: Palace of Youth and Sports
- FIFA code: KOS
- FIFA ranking: 59 ▲6 (8 May 2026)
Home colours	Away colours

First international
- Finland 1–3 Kosovo (Zadar, Croatia; 29 August 2016)

Biggest win
- Kosovo 11–0 Gibraltar (Igalo, Montenegro; 9 April 2026)

Biggest defeat
- Ukraine 7–1 Kosovo (Skopje, North Macedonia; 24 October 2019); Kosovo 1–7 Slovenia (Skopje, North Macedonia; 27 October 2019)

The Kosovo national futsal team (Albanian: Kombëtarja e futsallit të Kosovës; Serbian: Футсал репрезентација Косова, romanized: Futsal reprezentacija Kosova) represents Kosovo in international men's futsal. It is controlled by the Football Federation of Kosovo, the governing body for football in Kosovo, which also controls futsal.

== History ==
=== Permitting by FIFA to play friendlies ===
On 6 February 2013, FIFA gave the permission to play international friendly games against other member associations. Whereas, on 13 January 2014, there was a change of this permit that forbade Kosovo to play against the national teams of the countries of the former Yugoslavia. Club teams were also allowed to play friendlies and this happened after a FIFA Emergency Committee meeting. However, it was stipulated that clubs and representative teams of the Football Federation of Kosovo may not display national symbols as flags, emblems, etc. or play national anthems. The go-ahead was given after meetings between the Football Association of Serbia and Sepp Blatter.

=== Membership in UEFA and FIFA ===
In September 2015 at an UEFA Executive Committee meeting in Malta was approved the request from the federation to the admission in UEFA to the next Ordinary Congress to be held in Budapest. On 3 May 2016, at the Ordinary Congress. Kosovo were accepted into UEFA after members voted 28–24 in favor of Kosovo. Ten days later, Kosovo was accepted in FIFA during their 66th congress in Mexico with 141 votes in favour and 23 against.

== Competitive record ==
=== FIFA Futsal World Cup ===
On 12 December 2018, in Nyon, it was decided that Kosovo should be part in Group B of the 2020 FIFA Futsal World Cup qualification, together with Andorra, Belarus and Norway. On 30 January 2019, Kosovo made their debut on FIFA Futsal World Cup qualifications with a 5–0 away defeat against Belarus.

FIFA Futsal World Cup record										Qualification record					
Year	Round	Pos	Pld	W	D	L	GF	GA	Squad	Pld	W	D	L	GF	GA
(Netherlands) 1989 to (Spain) 1996	Part of Yugoslavia and Serbia and Montenegro														
(Guatemala) 2000 to (Thailand) 2012	Not a FIFA member														
(Colombia) 2016	Could not enter														
(Lithuania) 2021	Did not qualify									6	3	0	3	19	28
(Uzbekistan) 2024	Did not qualify									7	2	1	4	14	16
Total	—	0/9	0	0	0	0	0	0	—	13	5	1	7	33	44

=== UEFA Futsal Championship ===
On 21 October 2016, in Nyon, it was decided that Kosovo should be part in Group E of the UEFA Futsal Euro 2018 qualifying, together with Cyprus, Denmark and Norway. On 30 January 2017, Kosovo made his debut on UEFA Futsal Euro qualifying with a 1–5 away win against Norway that was simultaneously also the first-ever competitive win.

UEFA Futsal Championship record										Qualification record					
Year	Round	Pos	Pld	W	D	L	GF	GA	Squad	Pld	W	D	L	GF	GA
(Spain) 1996 to (Spain) 1999	Part of Serbia and Montenegro														
(Russia) 2001 to (Serbia) 2016	Not a UEFA member														
(Slovenia) 2018	Did not qualify									3	2	0	1	9	4
(Netherlands) 2022	Did not qualify									3	1	0	2	9	16
(Latvia) (Lithuania) (Slovenia) 2026	Did not qualify									6	2	0	4	16	25
Total	—	0/11	0	0	0	0	0	0	—	12	5	0	7	27	45

=== Non-FIFA Tournament ===
Kosovo has so far participated in three international tournaments. first at the Futsal Week 2016, an international futsal tournament. In which they won this tournament after beating Finland and Turkey in the Groupstage. They also participated at the 2021 Continental Futsal Championship in Thailand.

Tournament	Round	Pos	Pld	W	D	L	GF	GA
(Croatia) 2016 Futsal Week Tournament	Champions	1st	4	3	0	1	17	7
(Thailand) 2021 Continental Futsal Championship	Group stage	4th	3	0	1	2	10	14
(Croatia) 2023 April Cup Futsal Week	Group stage	3rd	2	0	1	1	5	10
Total	1 title	3/3	9	3	2	4	32	31

== Fixtures and results ==
=== 2021 ===
25 July 2021 Continental Futsal Championship	Uzbekistan	6–3	Kosovo	Bangkok, Thailand
15:00 UTC+7	Choriev 1', ?, 38'; Rakhmatov 2'; Ropiev 22'; Erkinov 36'	Report	Salihu 6'; Dervishaj 8', 17'	Stadium: Show DC Mall

26 July 2021 Continental Futsal Championship	Kosovo	6–6	Thailand	Bangkok, Thailand
17:15 UTC+7	Salihu 4'; Mazreku 20', 23'; Rukovci 31'; Dervishaj 40', 40+?	Report	Thueanklang 15', 36'; Musa 17'; Kaewwilai 32'; Srisubsaeng 36'; Wichian 38'	Stadium: Show DC Mall

27 July 2021 Continental Futsal Championship	Kosovo	1–2	Mozambique	Bangkok, Thailand
15:00 UTC+7	Rukovci 40'	Report	Francisco 4'; Jona 20'	Stadium: Show DC Mall

=== 2022 ===
8 April 2024 World Cup qualification	Bulgaria	0–2	Kosovo	Varna, Bulgaria
19:00 (18:00 EEST)		Report	Maxharraj 16:48; Salihu 26:17	Stadium: Palace of Culture and Sports; Referee: Dario Pezzuto (Italy)

9 April 2024 World Cup qualification	Kosovo	4–1	Scotland	Varna, Bulgaria
16:30 (15:30 EEST)	Maxharraj 2:41, 8:23, 35:11; Hajdini 27:04	Report	Steedman 13:25	Stadium: Palace of Culture and Sports; Referee: Georgios Kazakos (Cyprus)

11 April 2024 World Cup qualification	Kosovo	1–2	Armenia	Varna, Bulgaria
16:30 (15:30 EEST)	Kelmendi 19:20	Report	Kelmendi 1:03 (o.g.); Vitinho 7:08	Stadium: Palace of Culture and Sports; Referee: Yiangos Yiangou (Cyprus)

18 September 2024 World Cup qualification	Netherlands	2–1	Kosovo	Rotterdam, Netherlands
19:00	Dahmani 34:23; Ben Khalou 35:22	Report	Rukovci 39:11	Stadium: Topsportcentrum; Referee: Kirill Naishouler (Finland

7 October 2024 World Cup qualification	Ukraine	3–1	Kosovo	Salaspils, Latvia
18:00	Cherniavskyi 14:19; Korsun 23:57; Melnyk 26:24	Report	Kastrati 1:21	Stadium: Salaspils sporta nams Referee: Šarūnas Tamulynas (Lithuania)

9 November 2024 World Cup qualification	Kosovo	2–5	Ukraine	Pristina, Kosovo
17:00	Maxharraj 16:48; Salihu 33:31	Report	Cherniavskyi 5:28; Siryi 8:17; Mykytiuk 27:26; Fareniuk 30:55; Lebid 33:06	Stadium: Palace of Youth and Sports; Referee: Dejan Veselič (Slovenia)

=== 2023 ===
3 March 2024 World Cup qualification	Kosovo	3–3	Netherlands	Pristina, Kosovo
17:00	Dervishaj 8:35, 28:52; Alaj 32:17	Report	Ben Khalou 30:54; Bouyouzan 38:24; Bouzit 38:51	Stadium: Palace of Youth and Sports; Referee: Martina Piccolo (Italy)

14 April April Cup Futsal Week	Slovenia	6–1	Kosovo	Poreč, Croatia
18:15	Bukovec 10', 12'; Suban 20'; Berzelak 22'; Hozjan 28'; Totošković 35'	Report	Kaçandolli 19'	Stadium: Finda Hall

15 April April Cup Futsal Week	Montenegro	4–4 (4–1 p)	Kosovo	Poreč, Croatia
16:00	F. Kastrati 13', 32'; Mazreku 34', 36'	Report	Bulatović 3'; Lolović 17'; Puletić 36' (pen.), 38' (pen.)	Stadium: Finda Hall

== Players ==
=== Current squad ===
The following players were called up to the squad for the 2028 FIFA Futsal World Cup qualifying matches against Gibraltar, Austria and Montenegro on 9, 10 and 12 April 2026 respectively.

No.	Pos.	Player	Date of birth (age)	Caps	Goals	Club
1	GK	Bajram Ramadani	16 April 1991 (age 35)			(Football Federation of Kosovo) FC Prishtina 01
12	GK	Eduart Drenica	12 February 2000 (age 26)			(Football Federation of Kosovo) Drenica Futsal
3	DF	Malush Qerimi	28 January 1990 (age 36)			(Football Federation of Kosovo) FC Prishtina 01
7	DF	Shqiprim Imeri	24 June 2003 (age 23)			(Football Federation of Kosovo) Drenica Futsal
8	DF	Melos Kelmendi	15 September 1998 (age 27)			(Football Federation of Kosovo) FC Prishtina 01
10	DF	Ramadan Alaj (captain)	9 February 1988 (age 38)			(Football Federation of Kosovo) FC Prishtina 01
13	DF	Jeton Rukovci	18 July 1988 (age 38)			(Football Federation of Kosovo) FC Prishtina 01
14	DF	Lirigzon Xhinovci	19 February 1997 (age 29)			(Football Federation of Kosovo) Drenica Futsal
2	FW	Fitim Krasniqi	4 September 1995 (age 30)			(Football Federation of Kosovo) FC Prishtina 01
4	FW	Deliu Diar	13 May 1998 (age 28)			(Football Federation of Kosovo) Drenica Futsal
5	FW	Shefki Kameri	12 October 1995 (age 30)			(Football Federation of Kosovo) FC Prishtina 01
6	FW	Drilon Haxhijaj	24 March 2002 (age 24)			(Football Federation of Kosovo) Drenica Futsal
9	FW	Drilon Maxharraj	4 December 2000 (age 25)			(Football Federation of Kosovo) FC Prishtina 01
11	FW	Ylli Mazreku	30 December 1992 (age 33)			(Football Federation of Kosovo) FC Prishtina 01

=== Recent call-ups ===
The following players have also been called up to the squad within the last 12 months.

Pos.	Player	Date of birth (age)	Caps	Goals	Club	Latest call-up
GK	Behar Selmanaj	15 December 1996 (age 29)			(Kosovo) Drenica Futsal	v. (Czech Republic) Czechia, 20 December 2025
FW	Ari Kaqanolli	19 April 1997 (age 29)			(Kosovo) FC Prishtina 01	v. (Czech Republic) Czechia, 20 December 2025
^{INJ} Player withdrew from the squad due to an injury.^{PRE} Preliminary squad.^{RET} Retired from international futsal.

== Kosovo versus other countries ==
As of 11 April 2022
Head-to-head records are included only matches as FIFA member.

Opponent	Pld	W	D	L	GF	GA	GD	Win %
Armenia	1	0	0	1	1	2	−1	0.00
Albania	2	1	0	1	11	10	+1	50.00
Andorra	1	1	0	0	5	3	+2	100.00
Austria	1	1	0	0	4	2	+2	100.00
Belarus	1	0	0	1	0	5	−5	0.00
Bulgaria	1	1	0	0	2	0	+2	100.00
Cyprus	1	1	0	0	3	1	+2	100.00
Denmark	1	0	0	1	1	2	−1	0.00
Finland	2	1	0	1	8	7	+1	50.00
Georgia	1	0	0	1	1	6	−5	0.00
Germany	1	0	0	1	4	8	−4	0.00
Mozambique	1	0	1	0	1	2	−1	0.00
Netherlands	2	0	1	1	1	3	−2	0.00
North Macedonia	3	1	0	2	11	16	−5	33.33
Norway	2	2	0	0	10	2	+8	100.00
Scotland	1	1	0	0	4	1	+3	100.00
Slovenia	1	0	0	1	1	7	−6	0.00
Thailand	1	0	1	0	6	6	+0	0.00
Turkey	2	2	0	0	10	0	+10	100.00
Ukraine	1	0	0	1	1	7	−6	0.00
Uzbekistan	1	0	0	1	6	3	+3	0.00
21 Countries	28	12	3	13	91	93	−2	42.86

== See also ==
Men's

- National team
- Under-21
- Under-19
- Under-17
- Under-15

Women's

- National team
- Under-19
- Under-17
