= Ayoub Sørensen =

Danish-Moroccan footballer (born 1988)

Personal information
- Full name: Ayoub Ahmani Sørensen
- Date of birth: 12 April 1988 (age 38)
- Place of birth: Casablanca, Morocco
- Height: 1.72 m (5 ft 8 in)
- Position: Winger

Team information
- Current team: København Futsal

Youth career
- 2004–2005: BK Frem
- 2005–2007: Brøndby

Senior career*
Years	Team	Apps	(Gls)
2007–2008	Hvidovre	15	(3)
2009–2013	Lyngby	67	(12)
2013–2016	SønderjyskE	1	(0)
2019–2021	BK Frem	9	(1)
2021–2022	Vanløse	23	(5)
2022–2024	Futsal Gentofte (futsal)	25	(11)
2024–	København Futsal (futsal)	8	(19)

International career^{‡}
2008–2009	Morocco U20	11	(1)
2022–	Denmark futsal	17	(5)
- * Club domestic league appearances and goals as of 30 November 2024 ‡ National team caps and goals as of 6 November 2024

Ayoub Ahmani Sørensen (born 12 April 1988) is a Danish futsal player who plays for København Futsal and the Denmark national futsal team. A former professional footballer, he played as a winger, most notably for Lyngby and SønderjyskE in the Danish Superliga. Born in Morocco, he has also represented the Morocco U20 team.

== Club career ==
Sørensen moved with his family from Casablanca, Morocco, to Copenhagen, Denmark, at age seven. He began his football career with BK Frem before being scouted by Brøndby in 2005. At Brøndby, he made 55 reserve team appearances and scored seven goals. In September 2007, he joined Hvidovre in the Danish 1st Division and made his professional debut on 16 January 2009. After leaving Hvidovre, he signed with Lyngby.

In October 2010, Sørensen was subjected to racist abuse from opposing Hvidovre fans. After the match, Lyngby downplayed the incident and chose not to report it, a decision that drew criticism from representatives of the Danish Football Association (DBU) and Spillerforeningen, the union for professional footballers in Denmark.

On 19 July 2013, Sørensen signed a two-year contract with SønderjyskE after a successful trial. He left the club in January 2016 after struggling with injuries throughout his contract.

Sørensen went on trial with his former club, Hvidovre, in January 2019, after taking a break from football to focus on rehabilitation. Although he did not earn a contract with Hvidovre, he signed with his youth club, Frem, later that year. In February 2020, he extended his contract for another six months.

In August 2020, Sørensen joined Danish 3rd Division club Vanløse. He made a strong start, scoring multiple goals in league play and adding one in the Danish Cup during his first month at the club.

== International career ==
In 2006, Sørensen received his first call-up to the Morocco national under-20 football team for a training camp, and he played his first games in January 2008.

== Futsal career ==
In 2022, Sørensen switched to futsal, joining Futsal Gentofte. In September 2022, Sørensen received his first call-up to the Denmark national futsal team. He earned his debut cap in a 6–4 defeat against the Germany during the Nordic Futsal Cup in Sandefjord, Norway.

On 5 August 2024, København Futsal announced the signing of Sørensen.

== Career statistics ==
Appearances and goals by club, season and competition
Club	Season	League			National cup		Other		Total	
Club	Season	Division	Apps	Goals	Apps	Goals	Apps	Goals	Apps	Goals
Hvidovre	2008–09	Danish 1st Division	15	3	2	1	—		17	4
Lyngby	2008–09	Danish 1st Division	13	1	0	0	—		13	1
Lyngby	2009–10	Danish 1st Division	24	6	2	0	—		26	6
Lyngby	2010–11	Danish Superliga	19	3	2	1	—		21	4
Lyngby	2011–12	Danish Superliga	0	0	0	0	—		0	0
Lyngby	2012–13	Danish 1st Division	11	2	0	0	—		11	2
Lyngby	Total		67	12	4	1	—		71	13
SønderjyskE	2013–14	Danish Superliga	1	0	0	0	—		1	0
SønderjyskE	2014–15	Danish Superliga	0	0	0	0	—		0	0
SønderjyskE	2015–16	Danish Superliga	0	0	0	0	—		0	0
SønderjyskE	Total		1	0	0	0	—		1	0
BK Frem	2019–20	Danish 2nd Division	6	1	0	0	—		1	0
BK Frem	2020–21	Danish 2nd Division	3	0	0	0	—		3	0
BK Frem	Total		9	1	0	0	—		9	1
Vanløse	2021–22	Danish 3rd Division	23	5	2	1	—		25	6
Career total			115	21	8	3	0	0	123	24
