= Austria national futsal team =

Austria
- Association: Austrian Football Association
- Confederation: UEFA (Europe)
- Head coach: Patrik Barbic
- Asst coach: Rene Gaida
- Captain: Vahid Muharemovic
- Most caps: Sinan Bicer (41)
- Top scorer: Marco Meitz (17)
- Home stadium: Various
- FIFA code: AUT
- FIFA ranking: 107 ▼3 (8 May 2026)

First international
- Austria 2–2 Germany (Maria Enzersdorf, Austria; 12 April 2019)

Biggest win
- Malta 2–8 Austria (Pembroke, Malta; 18 April 2023)

Biggest defeat
- Belgium 11–0 Austria (Roosdaal, Belgium; 5 October 2022); Hungary 11–0 Austria (Szombathely, Hungary; 5 October 2024)

The Austria national futsal team is controlled by the Austrian Football Association, the governing body of futsal in Austria, and represents the country in international futsal competitions.

== History ==
With Austria a relative latecomer to the sport, the ÖFB Futsal League was first played for the 2010/11 season with Austrian clubs competing in the UEFA Futsal Champions League since the 2010–11 edition. In April 2018, the Austrian Football Association voted unanimously to form a national team for the first time. The association organized its first training camp in September 2018 to form the foundation of the team and prepare to play its first international match. The country played its first-ever international futsal match on 12 April 2019, a friendly against Germany. Adilaid Dizdarevic scored Austria's first-ever goal in the eventual 2–2 draw.

The team participated in qualifying for the UEFA Futsal Euro 2022, marking the first time the nation had entered the competition. The team entered qualification again for the next edition of the tournament. Despite winning its opening match against Bulgaria, the country again failed to qualify.

== Competitive record ==
=== FIFA Futsal World Cup ===
FIFA Futsal World Cup record
Year	Round	Pld	W	D	L	GF	GA
(Netherlands) 1989	did not enter						
(Hong Kong) 1992	did not enter						
(Spain) 1996	did not enter						
(Guatemala) 2000	did not enter						
(Taiwan) 2004	did not enter						
(Brazil) 2008	did not enter						
(Thailand) 2012	did not enter						
(Colombia) 2016	did not enter						
(Lithuania) 2021	did not enter						
(Uzbekistan) 2024	did not qualify						
Total	0/10	0	0	0	0	0	0

=== UEFA European Futsal Championship ===
UEFA Futsal Championship record
Year	Round	Pld	W	D*	L	GF	GA
(Spain) 1996	did not enter						
(Spain) 1999	did not enter						
(Russia) 2001	did not enter						
(Italy) 2003	did not enter						
(Czech Republic) 2005	did not enter						
(Portugal) 2007	did not enter						
(Hungary) 2010	did not enter						
(Croatia) 2012	did not enter						
(Belgium) 2014	did not enter						
(Serbia) 2016	did not enter						
(Slovenia) 2018	did not enter						
(Netherlands) 2022	did not qualify						
(Latvia) (Lithuania) (Slovenia) 2026	did not qualify						
Total	0/13	0	0	0	0	0	0

== Players ==
=== Current squad ===
The following players were called up to the squad for the 2028 FIFA Futsal World Cup qualifying matches against Montenegro, Kosovo and Gibraltar on 9, 10 and 12 April 2026 respectively.

No.	Pos.	Player	Date of birth (age)	Caps	Goals	Club
1	GK	Dominik Hemmelmayer	26 November 1990 (age 35)			(Austrian Football Association) FC Ljuti Krajišnici
12	GK	Youssef Helal	16 April 1995 (age 31)			(Austrian Football Association) Carinthia Flamengo FC
21	GK	Matthias Sadílek	5 September 2000 (age 25)			(Austrian Football Association) Stella Rossa Wien
2	DF	Qail Idrizi	28 April 2000 (age 26)			(German Football Association) Young Boys Balkan Futsal
8	DF	David Rajkovic	14 June 1994 (age 32)			(Austrian Football Association) Stella Rossa Wien
10	DF	Gustavo Steinwandter	8 March 1996 (age 30)			(Polish Football Association) Rekord Bielsko-Biała
13	DF	Sinan Bicer	17 November 1992 (age 33)			(Austrian Football Association) Futsal Club Innsbruck
15	DF	Vahid Muharemovic (captain)	19 July 1995 (age 31)			(Austrian Football Association) Futsal Klagenfurt
4	FW	Abdul Yazici	7 July 2004 (age 22)			(Austrian Football Association) Stella Rossa Wien
7	FW	Karim Sallam	10 November 1992 (age 33)			(Austrian Football Association) Stella Rossa Wien
9	FW	Matthias Binder	21 September 1995 (age 30)			(Austrian Football Association) Stella Rossa Wien
11	FW	Alec Flögel	11 November 2000 (age 25)			(Austrian Football Association) Stella Rossa Wien
14	FW	Andrej Vukovic	4 February 2000 (age 26)			(Austrian Football Association) Stella Rossa Wien
18	FW	Manuel Gager	2 January 2000 (age 26)			(Austrian Football Association) Stella Rossa Wien

=== Recent call-ups ===
The following players have also been called up to the squad within the last 12 months.

Pos.	Player	Date of birth (age)	Caps	Goals	Club	Latest call-up
GK	Wilco Suter	6 September 1992 (age 33)			(Austria) AFC Graz	v. Turkey, 12 November 2025
DF	Fatlum Kreka	22 April 1996 (age 30)			(Austria) Stella Rossa Wien	v. North Macedonia, 11 February 2026
DF	Nemanja Lukic	1 June 1999 (age 27)			(Austria) LPSV Kärnten	v. North Macedonia, 11 February 2026
DF	Amel Beglerović	8 September 1999 (age 26)			(Austria) FC Ljuti Krajišnici	v. Turkey, 12 November 2025
DF	Hasib Seperović	7 December 1998 (age 27)			(Austria) FC Diamant Linz	v. Turkey, 12 November 2025
FW	Edon Sahiti	10 June 2003 (age 23)			(Austria) FC Podrinje Graz	v. North Macedonia, 11 February 2026
FW	Kenan Sejdic	2 December 2002 (age 23)			(Austria) FC Ljuti Krajišnici	v. North Macedonia, 11 February 2026
FW	Saldin Pezić	11 November 1999 (age 26)			(Austria) FC Ljuti Krajišnici	v. Turkey, 12 November 2025
^{INJ} Player withdrew from the squad due to an injury.^{PRE} Preliminary squad.^{RET} Retired from international futsal.
