= Cherniavskyi =

Cherniavskyi, Cherniavska (Ukrainian: Чернявський, Чернявська) is a Ukrainian family name. Notable people with the surname include:

- Dmytro Cherniavskyi (born 1971), Ukrainian politician
- Ivan Cherniavskyi (1930–2001), Ukrainian Soviet Olympic athlete
- Serhii Cherniavskyi (born 1976), Ukrainian cyclist

== See also ==
- Cherniavsky (disambiguation)
- Czerniawski
