= Luka Perić =

Croatian footballer

Personal information
- Date of birth: 14 December 1987 (age 38)
- Place of birth: Croatia
- Position: Defender

Senior career*
Years	Team	Apps	(Gls)
-2005	Dinamo Zagreb	0	(0)
2005	Karlovac		
2006	Lokomotiva		
2006-2007	Inter Zaprešić		
2007-2008	HAŠK		
2008	Inter Zaprešić	0	(0)
2009	Vinogradar		
2009	Segesta		
2010-2011	Gorica		
2011-2013	Žalgiris	68	(8)
2014	Östersunds	13	(0)
2015-2016	Gorica	29	(3)
2017	RFS	5	(0)
2017	Jonava	17	(1)
2018	SV Wildon	24	(4)
2019-	Zagorec Krapina		
- * Club domestic league appearances and goals

Luka Perić (Lithuanian: Luka Peričius; born 14 December 1987 in Croatia) is a Croatian footballer.

== Career ==
Due to HNK Gorica's license to compete in the Croatian top flight being revoked, causing them to remain in the second division despite achieving promotion, Peric signed for Lithuanian club FK Žalgiris even though he rejected their offer earlier.

After helping FK Žalgiris win their first league title in 14 seasons in 2013, he signed for Swedish side Östersunds FK.

By 2017/18, Perić was playing in the Austrian fourth division with SV Wildon.
