= Luan Muller =

Brazilian futsal player

Personal information
- Full name: Luan Muller Barboza
- Date of birth: 17 March 1993 (age 33)
- Place of birth: São Paulo, Brazil
- Height: 1.73 m (5 ft 8 in)
- Position: Goalkeeper

Team information
- Current team: Palma Futsal
- Number: 3

Youth career
- –2013: São Paulo

Senior career*
| Years | Team | Apps | (Gls) |
| 2014–2017 | Sorocaba | | |
| 2018 | Foz Cataratas | 19 | (0) |
| 2019-2020 | Leo Futsal | | |
| 2020 | ACEL | | |
| 2020-2022 | AD Fundão | | |
| 2022 | Palma Futsal | | |

International career
| 2018 | Brazil | | |
- Armenia
- * Club domestic league appearances and goals as of 00:00, 5 March 2019 (UTC)

Luan Muller Barboza (born 17 March 1993) is a professional futsal player, who plays as a goalkeeper for Palma Futsal. Born in Brazil, he plays for the Armenian national team.
