= Henri Alamikkotervo =

Finnish professional futsal player (born 2001)

Personal information
- Date of birth: 6 January 2001 (age 25)
- Place of birth: Tervola, Finland
- Height: 1.92 m (6 ft 4 in)

Team information
- Current team: Akaa Futsal

Youth career
- KePS

Senior career*
Years	Team	Apps	(Gls)
2019–2021	Tornion Palloveikot	44	(28)
2021–2023	GFT	59	(45)
2023–2024	Bisontes Castellón	27	(2)
2024–	Akaa Futsal	0	(0)

International career
2019–	Finland	32	(9)
- * Club domestic league appearances and goals as of 29 July 2024

Henri Alamikkotervo (born 6 January 2001) is a Finnish professional futsal player who plays for Finnish Futsal-Liiga club Akaa Futsal and the Finland national futsal team. He represented Finland at the UEFA Futsal Euro 2022, which was their first ever appearance in the final tournament.

== Honours ==
- Football Association of Finland Player of the Year: 2023
