= Germany national futsal team =

Germany
- Association: German Football Association
- Confederation: UEFA (Europe)
- Head coach: Marcel Loovesfeld
- Asst coach: Daniel Fredel
- Captain: Cristopher Wittig
- Most caps: Cristopher Wittig
- Top scorer: Muhammet Sözer
- FIFA code: GER
- FIFA ranking: 45 (24 September 2026)
Home colours	Away colours

First international
- (Georgia (country)) Georgia 4–0 Germany (Tbilisi, Georgia; 16 April 2016)

Biggest win
- Germany 8–0 Gibraltar (7 April 2022)

Biggest defeat
- Czech Republic 13–2 Germany (Plzeň, Czech Republic; 3 December 2017)

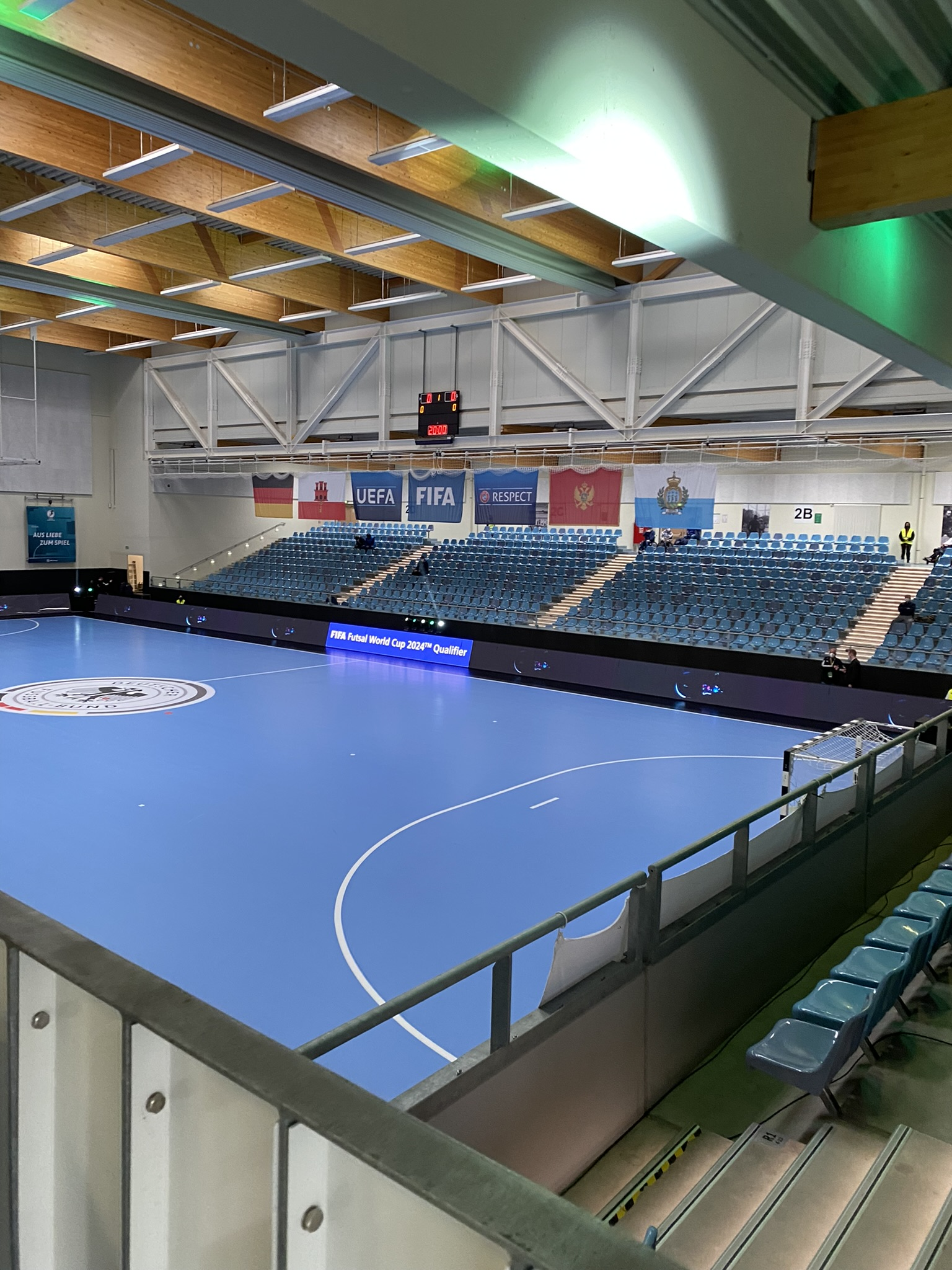
The CU-Arena during a match of the German Futsal National Team

The Germany national futsal team represents Germany during international futsal competitions such as the FIFA Futsal World Cup and the European Championships. The German Football Association decided the foundation of a national team on 4 December 2015 within the context of a so-called Futsal Masterplan in order to participate in the qualification for the UEFA Futsal Euro 2018. Germany achieved their first international victory at Hamburg's 2,092-capacity Inselpark on 30 October 2016 in a friendly against England, which ended 5–3. Germany then played the qualification for the UEFA Futsal Euro 2018 but were eliminated in the preliminary round, finishing in third place in their qualifying group C with four points, above Estonia and behind group winners Latvia and Armenia.

== Results ==
For a full list of fixtures and results, see: DFB profile.

=== Results By Years ===
As of 23 July 2025

Year	M	W	D	L	GF	GA	GD	Ref
2016	4	1	1	2	8	15	-7	
2017	9	2	1	6	24	51	-27	
2018	8	2	1	5	13	21	-8	
2019	12	2	5	5	25	40	-15	
2020	6	3	0	3	21	20	+1	
2021	7	2	1	4	25	30	-5	
2022	12	3	4	5	34	33	+1	
2023	10	5	0	5	26	33	-7	
2024	5	3	0	2	11	20	-9	
2025	4	2	0	2	6	19	-13	
Total	77	25	13	39	193	282	-89	

=== Results By Matches ===
#	Opponent	Result
2016
1	Georgia	0-4
2	Georgia	0-5
3	England	5-3
4	England	3-3
2017
5	Armenia	3-5
6	Latvia	3-3
7	Estonia	5-4
8	Turkey	3-2
9	Belgium	5-10
10	Slovenia	0-4
11	Slovenia	1-5
12	Czech Republic	2-13
13	Czech Republic	2-5
2018
14	Denmark	2-3
15	Denmark	2-5
16	Georgia	2-4
17	Georgia	1-3
18	Japan	0-0
19	Japan	0-2
20	Czech Republic	4-3
21	Czech Republic	2-1
2019
22	Georgia	1-5
23	Denmark	5-2
24	Israel	2-2
25	Austria	2-2
26	Austria	2-2
27	England	2-2
28	England	2-2
29	Sweden	3-2
30	Sweden	4-6
31	Czech Republic	0-3
32	Portugal	0-5
33	Latvia	2-7
2020
34	Georgia	1-3
35	Kosovo	8-4
36	Austria	4-3
37	Netherlands	1-3
38	Switzerland	2-4
39	Switzerland	5-3
2021
40	Wales	3-2
41	Wales	7-4
42	Sweden	3-4
43	Moldova	3-3
44	Belgium	2-4
45	Netherlands	4-6
46	France	3-7
2022
47	Czech Republic	1-3
48	Czech Republic	4-7
49	Gibraltar	8-0
50	San Marino	5-0
51	Montenegro	3-3
52	Denmark	6-4
53	Norway	2-2
54	Sweden	2-4
55	Denmark	1-4
56	Latvia	1-5
57	Slovakia	1-1
58	Slovakia	0-0
2023
59	Netherlands	4-3
60	Latvia	3-1
61	Sweden	4-2
62	Sweden	4-2
63	Croatia	1-5
64	France	2-6
65	Slovakia	4-3
66	Slovakia	3-4
67	Croatia	0-4
68	France	1-3
2024
69	Spain	3-2
70	Spain	0-9
71	Turkey	6-2
72	Romania	0-6
73	Cyprus	2-1
2025
74	Ukraine	3-5
75	Ukraine	0-9
76	Romania	2-1
77	Cyprus	1-4

== Tournament records ==
=== FIFA Futsal World Cup ===
FIFA World Cup Record
Year	Round	M	W	D	L	GF	GA
(Netherlands) 1989	did not enter						
(Hong Kong) 1992	did not enter						
(Spain) 1996	did not enter						
(Guatemala) 2000	did not enter						
(Chinese Taipei) 2004	did not enter						
(Brazil) 2008	did not enter						
(Thailand) 2012	did not enter						
(Colombia) 2016	did not enter						
(Lithuania) 2020	did not qualify						
(Uzbekistan) 2024	did not qualify						
Total		—	—	—	—	—	—

=== UEFA Futsal Championship ===
UEFA European Futsal Championship Record
Year	Round	M	W	D	L	GF	GA
(Spain) 1996	did not enter						
(Spain) 1999	did not enter						
(Russia) 2001	did not enter						
(Italy) 2003	did not enter						
(Czech Republic) 2005	did not enter						
(Portugal) 2007	did not enter						
(Hungary) 2010	did not enter						
(Croatia) 2012	did not enter						
(Belgium) 2014	did not enter						
(Serbia) 2016	did not enter						
(Slovenia) 2018	did not qualify						
(Netherlands) 2022	did not qualify						
(Latvia) (Lithuania) (Slovenia) 2026	did not qualify						
Total		—	—	—	—	—	—

== Staff ==
Position	Name
Head coach	(Netherlands) Marcel Loosveld
Assistant coaches	(Germany) Daniel Gerlach
Analyst	(Germany) Daniel Fredel
Doctor	(Germany) Dr. Thorsten Dolla
Teammanager	(Germany) Lars Schepull
Kit-manager	(Germany) Thorsten Fiala
Physiotherapist	(Germany) Munim Akthar

== Players ==
=== Current squad ===
The following players were called up to the squad for the UEFA 2024 FIFA Futsal World Cup qualification matches against Slovakia on 5 and 9 October 2023.

No.	Pos.	Player	Date of birth (age)	Caps	Goals	Club
1	GK	Pavlos Wiegels	24 July 1994 (age 32)	51	0	(German Football Association) FC Liria Berlin
12	GK	Philipp Pless	3 April 1991 (age 35)	45	0	(German Football Association) TSV Weilimdorf
20	GK	Christian De Grooth	18 May 1989 (age 37)	5	0	(German Football Association) Fortuna Düsseldorf
8	DF	Gabriel Oliveira	7 February 1993 (age 33)	19	4	(German Football Association) MCH FC Bielefeld
9	DF	Luis Rodriguez	16 May 2001 (age 25)	13	7	(German Football Association) MCH FC Bielefeld
16	DF	Onur Saglam	23 March 1993 (age 33)	30	11	(German Football Association) Hamburger SV
18	DF	Kadir Sentürk	9 March 1999 (age 27)	4	0	(German Football Association) MCH FC Bielefeld
2	FW	Christopher Wittig (captain)	27 November 1995 (age 30)	58	20	(German Football Association) HOT 05 Futsal
4	FW	Suad Ak	6 July 2002 (age 24)	23	6	(German Football Association) TSV Weilimdorf
10	FW	Michael Meyer	12 September 1988 (age 38)	48	17	(German Football Association) Hamburger SV
13	FW	Muhammet Sözer	18 October 1994 (age 31)	58	19	(German Football Association) TSV Weilimdorf
14	FW	Fouad Aghnima	29 October 1997 (age 28)	25	4	(German Football Association) MCH FC Bielefeld
15	FW	Fabian Schulz	18 September 1995 (age 31)	19	5	(German Football Association) FC Liria Berlin
17	FW	Kim Herterich	19 January 2001 (age 25)	6	0	(German Football Association) Jahn Regensburg
19	FW	Pedro Strickert	20 April 2004 (age 22)	1	0	(German Football Association) MCH FC Bielefeld

=== Recent call-ups ===
The following players have also been called up to the squad within the last 12 months.

Pos.	Player	Date of birth (age)	Caps	Goals	Club	Latest call-up
DF	Davud Vehab	9 December 1998 (age 27)	4	0	Unattached	v. Sweden, 18 April 2023
DF	Maximilian Grünberg	5 November 1999 (age 26)	4	0	(Germany) Hamburger SV	v. Sweden, 18 April 2023
FW	Vidoje Matic	27 January 1996 (age 30)	30	3	(Germany) MCH FC Bielefeld	v. Sweden, 18 April 2023
FW	Aytürk Gecim	25 November 1995 (age 30)	19	3	(Germany) MCH FC Bielefeld	v. Sweden, 18 April 2023
FW	Malik Hadziavdic	25 August 1997 (age 29)	26	2	(Germany) FC Liria Berlin	v. Latvia, 3 March 2023
^{COV} Player withdrew from the squad due to contracting COVID-19.^{INJ} Player withdrew from the squad due to an injury.^{PRE} Preliminary squad.^{RET} Retired from international futsal.
