= Dmytro Cherniavskyi =

Ukrainian lawyer

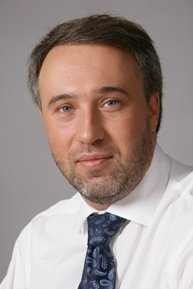
- Born: Dmytriy Leonidovich Cherniavskiy; July 16, 1971 (age 54); Ukraine, Donetsk
- Education: State Institute of Donetsk, National Taras Shevchenko University of Kiev
- Occupation: lawyer
- Known for: advisor to the Ukrainian Minister of Family, Youth, and Sport
- Spouse: Maria Vladimirovna
- Children: 2
- Parents: Leonid Vladimirowich Cherniavskiy (father); Zhanna Vasyliivna Cherniavska (mother)

Dmytro Leonidovych Cherniavskyi (Ukrainian: Cherniavskiy Dmytro Leonidovych, born July 16, 1971) is the advisor to the Ukrainian Minister of Family, Youth, and Sport.

== Early life and education ==
He was born on July 16, 1971, in Donetsk. His father was Leonid Vladimirowich Cherniavskiy; his mother, Zhanna Vasyliivna Cherniavska, both citizens of Ukraine. He entered school in Donetsk in 1978, and finished school in 1986. He then entered the State Institute of Donetsk on 1991, graduating in 1997. In 1998, he enter law school at the National Taras Shevchenko University of Kiev, and graduated in 2000.

He is married to wife Maria Vladimirovna and has two children, Gleb and Gabriel.

== Employment ==
From August 1996 to December 1998, he worked as an interpreter in a real estate and investment company. From January 1999 to July 2002, he was employed at Cherniavskiy and Partners. From August 2002 to April 2008, he worked as a legal councillor.

In 2003, he became the vice-president of the Eastern European division of Tax Consulting U.K. From 2003 to 2004, he was a chairman of board of a Russian subsidiary of UkrSibbank. From 2004 until 2008, he was a member of the committee of directors of corporation Aurora.

On May 13, 2008, he was appointed as advisor to the Minister of Family, Youth, and Sport. On October 7, 2008, he was appointed alternate director general of the government enterprise NSK Olimpiyskiy and led the organizational management for preparation of the stadium for the EURO 2012.
