= Iiro Vanha =

Finnish futsal player and former footballer (born 1994)

Personal information
- Full name: Iiro Olavi Vanha
- Date of birth: 17 December 1994 (age 31)
- Place of birth: Tornio, Finland
- Height: 1.75 m (5 ft 9 in)
- Position: Midfielder

Team information
- Current team: Olmissum (futsal)
- Number: 19

Youth career
- –2011: TP-47 (football)

Senior career*
Years	Team	Apps	(Gls)
2012–2017	TP-47 (football)	51	(7)
2015	→ Santa Claus (football; loan)	18	(1)
2014–2018	FC Kemi (futsal)	71	(48)
2018	PS Kemi (football)	24	(1)
2018–2021	ToPV (futsal)	63	(48)
2019	SalPa (football)	13	(0)
2020	TP-47 (football)	7	(5)
2021–2023	Akaa (futsal)	56	(27)
2023–	Olmissum (futsal)	27	(11)

International career
2016–	Finland (futsal)	71	(16)
- * Club domestic league appearances and goals as of 29 July 2024

Iiro Olavi Vanha (born 17 December 1994) is a Finnish professional futsal player who plays for Croatian club Olmissum and the Finland national futsal team. He represented Finland at the UEFA Futsal Euro 2022, which was their first ever appearance in the final tournament. He is also a former professional footballer who played as a midfielder.
