= Bulgaria national futsal team =

Bulgaria
- Nickname(s): Лъвовете (The Lions)
- Association: Bulgarian Football Union
- Confederation: UEFA (Europe)
- Head coach: Hristo Stoichkov
- Captain: Stanimir Zahariev
- FIFA code: BUL
- FIFA ranking: 119 (24 September 2026)
Home colours	Away colours

First international
- Bulgaria 2–0 Macedonia (Lovech, Bulgaria; 11 May 2002)

Biggest win
- Bulgaria 7–0 Malta (Cospicua, Malta; 22 January 2011); Bulgaria 9–2 Scotland (Varna, Bulgaria; 11 April 2022)

Biggest defeat
- Bulgaria 2–21 Spain (Ohrid, Macedonia; 24 October 2002)

FIFA World Cup
- Appearances: 0

European Championship
- Appearances: 0

The Bulgaria national futsal team represents Bulgaria in international futsal competitions and is controlled by the Bulgarian Football Union and represents the country in international futsal competitions, such as the FIFA Futsal World Cup and the European Championships.

== Tournament records ==
=== FIFA Futsal World Cup ===
FIFA Futsal World Cup record										Qualification record						
Year	Round	Position	Pld	W	D	L	GF	GA	Squad	Outcome	Pld	W	D	L	GF	GA
(Netherlands) 1989	Did not enter									Did not enter						
(Hong Kong) 1992	Did not enter									Did not enter						
(Spain) 1996	Did not enter									Did not enter						
(Guatemala) 2000	Did not enter									Did not enter						
(Taiwan) 2004	Did not enter									Did not enter						
(Brazil) 2008	Did not qualify									Group 10 4th place	3	0	0	3	3	10
(Thailand) 2012	Did not qualify									Group 2 4th place	6	2	0	4	20	26
(Colombia) 2016	Did not qualify									Group F runners-up	2	0	2	0	2	2
(Lithuania) 2021	Did not qualify									Group G 3rd place	3	1	1	1	5	9
(Uzbekistan) 2024	Did not qualify									Group C 3rd place	3	1	0	2	9	7
2028	Did not qualify									Group C 4th place	3	0	0	3	4	14
Total	—	0/11	0	0	0	0	0	0	—	6/10	20	4	3	13	43	68

=== UEFA Futsal Championship ===
- 1996 - did not qualify
- 1999 - did not qualify
- 2001 - did not qualify
- 2003 - did not qualify
- 2005 - did not qualify
- 2007 - did not qualify
- 2010 - did not qualify
- 2012 - did not qualify
- 2014 - did not qualify
- 2016 - did not qualify
- 2018 - did not qualify
- 2022 – did not qualify
- 2026 – did not qualify

== Players ==
=== Current squad ===
The following players were called up to the squad for the 2028 FIFA Futsal World Cup qualifying matches against North Macedonia, Lithuania and Turkey on 9, 10 and 12 April 2026 respectively.

No.	Pos.	Player	Date of birth (age)	Caps	Goals	Club
1	GK	Milen Kirov	11 October 1987 (age 39)			(Football Association of the Czech Republic) SK Slavia Prague
12	GK	Hristo Pavlov	8 October 1996 (age 30)			(Bulgarian Football Union) Amigo Northwest
23	GK	Stefan Mihaylov	26 July 2004 (age 22)			(Bulgarian Football Union) Amigo Northwest
5	DF	Nikolay Georgiev	20 May 2003 (age 23)			(Bulgarian Football Union) FC Etar Futsal
9	DF	Georgi Nikolov	24 December 2003 (age 22)			(Bulgarian Football Union) FC Etar Futsal
14	DF	Dimitar Shalamanov	14 January 1997 (age 29)			(Bulgarian Football Union) Amigo Northwest
2	FW	Vladimir Baharov (captain)	23 January 1992 (age 34)			(Bulgarian Football Union) Amigo Northwest
3	FW	Ivelin Kuzmanov	10 June 2001 (age 25)			(Bulgarian Football Union) Amigo Northwest
4	FW	Martin Stoykov	11 August 1990 (age 36)			(Bulgarian Football Union) Amigo Northwest
6	FW	Dimitar Petev	16 May 1989 (age 37)			(Bulgarian Football Union) FSC Levski Sofia
7	FW	Dimitar Videv	25 November 1997 (age 28)			(Bulgarian Football Union) Amigo Northwest
10	FW	Daniel Dimov	16 August 1985 (age 41)			(Bulgarian Football Union) Amigo Northwest
11	FW	Dmytro Zhylchuk	15 August 1996 (age 30)			(Bulgarian Football Union) FC Cherno More
13	FW	Zhyulien Benkov	23 June 1996 (age 30)			(Bulgarian Football Union) Amigo Northwest

=== Recent call-ups ===
The following players have also been called up to the squad within the last 12 months.

Pos.	Player	Date of birth (age)	Caps	Goals	Club	Latest call-up
GK	Martin Asenov	10 March 1999 (age 27)			(Bulgaria) FSC Levski Sofia	v. France, 11 February 2026
DF	Veselin Gerenski	29 May 1994 (age 32)			(Bulgaria) FC Cherno More	v. France, 11 February 2026
FW	Milen Ivanov				(Bulgaria) FC Doulhzelm	v. France, 11 February 2026
FW	Dimitar Velikov				(Bulgaria) CSKA Sofia Futsal	v. France, 11 February 2026
^{INJ} Player withdrew from the squad due to an injury.^{PRE} Preliminary squad.^{RET} Retired from international futsal.

== See also ==
- Futsal in Bulgaria
- Bulgaria national football team
