= North Macedonia national futsal team =

Macedonia
- Nickname(s): Црвени Рисови Crveni Risovi (Red Lynxes); Црвени Лавови Crveni Lavovi (Red Lions)
- Association: Football Federation of Macedonia
- Confederation: UEFA (Europe)
- Head coach: Gazmend Hisejini
- FIFA code: MKD
- FIFA ranking: 58 ▲24 (8 May 2026)
- Highest FIFA ranking: 36 (24 March 2016)
Home colours	Away colours

First international
- Croatia 12–2 Macedonia (Karlovac, Croatia; January 29, 1999)

Biggest win
- Macedonia 21–2 Bulgaria (Ohrid, Macedonia; October 24, 2002)

Biggest defeat
- Croatia 12–2 Macedonia (Karlovac, Croatia; January 29, 1999); Russia 10–0 Macedonia (Zabrze, Poland; January 14, 2000)

FIFA World Cup
- Appearances: 0

UEFA Futsal Championship
- Appearances: 0

The Macedonia national futsal team is controlled by the Football Federation of Macedonia, the governing body for futsal in North Macedonia. It represents the country in international futsal competitions, such as the World Cup and the European Championships.

== Competition history ==
=== FIFA Futsal World Cup ===
- 1989 - Part of Yugoslavia
- 1992 - did not compete
- 1996 - did not compete
- 2000 - did not qualify
- 2004 - did not qualify
- 2008 - did not qualify
- 2012 - did not qualify
- 2016 - did not qualify
- 2021 - did not qualify
- 2024 - did not qualify

=== UEFA Futsal Championship ===
- 1996 - did not compete
- 1999 - did not compete
- 2001 - did not qualify
- 2003 - did not qualify
- 2005 - did not qualify
- 2007 - did not qualify
- 2010 - did not qualify
- 2012 - did not qualify
- 2014 - did not qualify
- 2016 - did not qualify
- 2018 - did not qualify
- 2022 - did not qualify
- 2026 - did not qualify

== Players ==
=== Current squad ===
The following players were called up to the squad for the 2028 FIFA Futsal World Cup qualifying matches against Bulgaria, Turkey and Lithuania on 9, 10 and 12 April 2026 respectively.

No.	Pos.	Player	Date of birth (age)	Caps	Goals	Club
1	GK	Ivan Stojanovski	28 November 1990 (age 35)			(Football Federation of Macedonia) KMF Kegi Mobi
12	GK	Antonio Petrovski	26 November 1993 (age 32)			(Football Federation of Macedonia) KMF Proekt
4	DF	Ivan Krstevski (captain)	25 June 1992 (age 34)			(Football Federation of Macedonia) KMF Forca
5	DF	Jasir Zekiri	13 December 1992 (age 33)			(Football Federation of Macedonia) KMF Forca
7	DF	Berat Ramadani	1 September 1995 (age 30)			(Football Federation of Macedonia) KMF Forca
11	DF	Toni Kirevski	14 November 1999 (age 26)			(Croatian Football Federation) MNK Olmissum
15	DF	Bojan Janev	4 March 2004 (age 22)			(Football Federation of Macedonia) KMF Proekt
2	FW	David Ristovski	21 December 2001 (age 24)			(Football Federation of Macedonia) KMF Proekt
3	FW	Taulant Ismaili	1 February 1990 (age 36)			(Football Federation of Macedonia) KMF Balkan
6	FW	Igor Leovski	11 December 1993 (age 32)			(Slovak Football Association) FK Lučenec
9	FW	Erkan Seferi	6 February 1992 (age 34)			(Football Federation of Macedonia) KMF Forca
10	FW	Mario Blagojevski	4 June 1997 (age 29)			(Football Federation of Macedonia) KMF Proekt
13	FW	Jakup Ramadani	28 November 1999 (age 26)			(Football Federation of Kosovo) Drenica Futsal
14	FW	Dimitar Janev	3 September 2001 (age 24)			(Football Federation of Macedonia) KMF Proekt

=== Recent call-ups ===
The following players have also been called up to the squad within the last 12 months.

Pos.	Player	Date of birth (age)	Caps	Goals	Club	Latest call-up
DF	Angel Gashtev				(North Macedonia) KMF Kegi Mobi	v. Austria, 11 February 2026
DF	Nikola Anchevski	5 October 2004 (age 21)			(North Macedonia) KMF Proekt	v. Austria, 11 February 2026
FW	Sadat Ziberi	29 August 1993 (age 32)			(Italy) Atletico Conegliano	v. Austria, 11 February 2026
FW	Samir Vejseli	18 August 2006 (age 19)			(Italy) Atletico Conegliano	v. Austria, 11 February 2026
FW	Gjorgi Kocevski	3 August 2003 (age 23)			(North Macedonia) KMF Proekt	v. Austria, 11 February 2026
^{INJ} Player withdrew from the squad due to an injury.^{PRE} Preliminary squad.^{RET} Retired from international futsal.
