= Roosdaal =

- Municipality
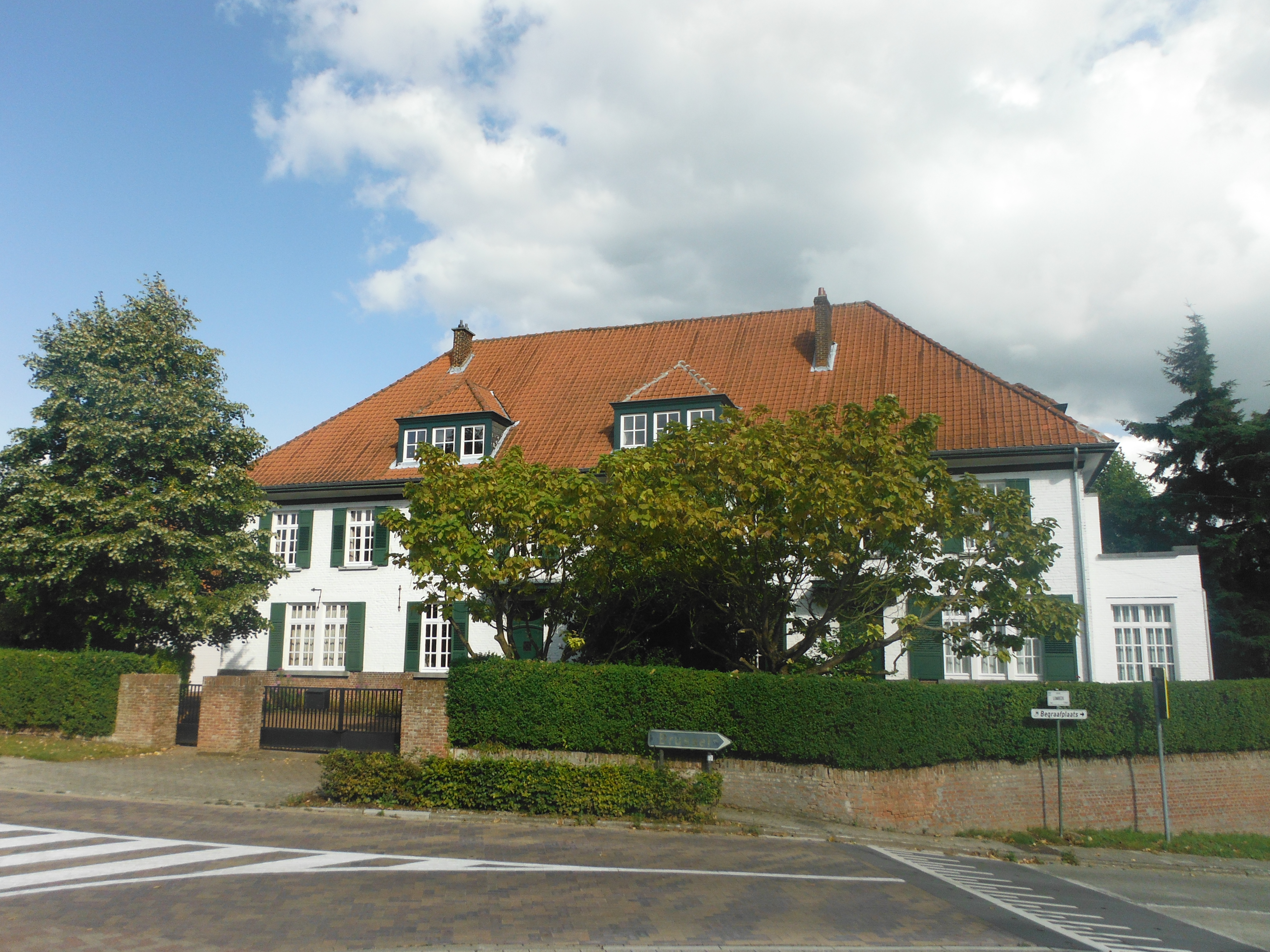

- Flag Coat of arms

- Location of Roosdaal in Flemish Brabant
- Interactive map of Roosdaal
- Location in Belgium
- Coordinates: 50°51′N 04°05′E
- Country: Belgium
- Community: Flemish Community
- Region: Flemish Region
- Province: Flemish Brabant
- Arrondissement: Halle-Vilvoorde

Government
  - Mayor: Wim Goossens (CD&V)
  - Governing party: CD&V

Area
  - Total: 21.92 km^{2} (8.46 sq mi)

Population (2018-01-01)
  - Total: 11,629
  - Density: 530.5/km^{2} (1,374/sq mi)
- Postal codes: 1760, 1761
- NIS code: 23097
- Area codes: 054, 053, 02
- Website: www.roosdaal.be

Roosdaal (Dutch pronunciation: [ˈroːzdaːl]) is a municipality located in the Belgian province of Flemish Brabant. The municipality comprises the towns of Borchtlombeek, Onze-Lieve-Vrouw-Lombeek, Pamel and Strijtem. It is also situated in the Pajottenland.

On January 1, 2016, Roosdaal had a total population of 11,494. The total area is 21.69 km² which gives a population density of 530 inhabitants per km². Roosdaal is well known in Flanders for its berries through its annual strawberry convention. One of its most notable tourist attractions is the historic Hertboom Windmill.

In 2008, during a national television competition, Onze-lieve-vrouw-Lombeek was voted "The most beautiful village in Flemish Brabant", but it lost the overall Flemish competition to the town of Oud-Rekem.

== Notable people ==
- Frans Van Cauwelaert (b. 10 January 1880 – 17 May 1961), politician and lawyer.
