= UEFA Futsal Euro 2018 qualifying =

Tournament details
- Dates: 24 January – 26 September 2017
- Teams: 47 (from 1 confederation)

Tournament statistics
- Matches played: 86
- Goals scored: 510 (5.93 per match)
- Top scorer(s): (Albania) Halim Selmanaj (Georgia (country)) Archil Sebiskveradze (9 goals each)

The UEFA Futsal Euro 2018 qualifying competition was a men's futsal competition that determined the 11 teams joining the automatically qualified hosts Slovenia in the UEFA Futsal Euro 2018 final tournament.

A total of 47 UEFA member national teams entered the qualifying competition (including Germany and Kosovo who entered for the first time).

== Format ==
The qualifying competition consists of three rounds:

- Preliminary round: The 26 lowest-ranked teams are drawn into five groups of four teams and two groups of three teams. Each group is played in single round-robin format at one of the teams which were pre-selected as hosts. The seven group winners advance to the main round.
- Main round: The 28 teams (21 highest-ranked teams and seven preliminary round qualifiers) are drawn into seven groups of four teams. Each group is played in single round-robin format at one of the teams which were pre-selected as hosts. The seven group winners qualify for the final tournament, while the seven runners-up and the best third-placed team advanced to the play-offs.
- Play-offs: The eight teams are drawn into four ties to play home-and-away two-legged matches to determine the last four qualified teams.

=== Tiebreakers ===
In the preliminary round and main round, teams are ranked according to points (3 points for a win, 1 point for a draw, 0 points for a loss), and if tied on points, the following tiebreaking criteria are applied, in the order given, to determine the rankings (Regulations Articles 14.01 and 14.02):

1. Points in head-to-head matches among tied teams;
2. Goal difference in head-to-head matches among tied teams;
3. Goals scored in head-to-head matches among tied teams;
4. If more than two teams are tied, and after applying all head-to-head criteria above, a subset of teams are still tied, all head-to-head criteria above are reapplied exclusively to this subset of teams;
5. Goal difference in all group matches;
6. Goals scored in all group matches;
7. Penalty shoot-out if only two teams have the same number of points, and they met in the last round of the group and are tied after applying all criteria above (not used if more than two teams have the same number of points, or if their rankings are not relevant for qualification for the next stage);
8. Disciplinary points (red card = 3 points, yellow card = 1 point, expulsion for two yellow cards in one match = 3 points);
9. UEFA coefficient;
10. Drawing of lots.

To determine the best third-placed team from the main round, the following criteria are applied (Regulations Article 15.01):

1. Points;
2. Goal difference;
3. Goals scored;
4. Disciplinary points;
5. UEFA coefficient;
6. Drawing of lots.

In the play-offs, the team that scores more goals on aggregate over the two legs qualifies for the final tournament. If the aggregate score is level, the away goals rule is applied, i.e., the team that scores more goals away from home over the two legs advances. If away goals are also equal, extra time is played. The away goals rule is again applied after extra time, i.e., if there are goals scored during extra time and the aggregate score is still level, the visiting team advances by virtue of more away goals scored. If no goals are scored during extra time, the tie is decided by penalty shoot-out (Regulations Article 20.01).

== Schedule ==
The qualifying matches are played on the following dates.

Stage	Dates
Preliminary round	24 January – 2 February 2017
Main round	3–12 April 2017
Play-offs	10–13 & 24–27 September 2017

== Entrants ==
The teams were ranked according to their coefficient ranking, calculated based on the following:

- UEFA Futsal Euro 2014 final tournament and qualifying competition
- UEFA Futsal Euro 2016 final tournament and qualifying competition
- 2016 FIFA Futsal World Cup final tournament and qualifying competition

The 21 highest-ranked teams entered the main round, while the 26 lowest-ranked teams entered the preliminary round. The coefficient ranking was also used for seeding in the preliminary round and main round draws, where each team was assigned a seeding position according to their ranking for the respective draw, with seven teams each pre-selected as hosts for the preliminary round and the main round (marked by (H) below).

Final tournament hosts
Team	Coeff	Rank
**Slovenia**	6,389	7

Teams entering main round

Seeding position 1
Team	Coeff	Rank
**Russia**	10,605	1
**Spain**	10,017	2
**Portugal**	9,250	3
**Italy**	8,889	4
**Ukraine** **(H)**	7,944	5
**Azerbaijan** **(H)**	7,544	6
**Kazakhstan** **(H)**	6,333	8

Seeding position 2
Team	Coeff	Rank
**Serbia**	5,556	9
Croatia	5,556	10
Czech Republic	4,667	11
**Romania** **(H)**	4,278	12
Hungary	4,222	13
Slovakia	3,389	14
Netherlands	3,333	15

Seeding position 3
Team	Coeff	Rank
Belgium	3,278	16
Bosnia and Herzegovina	3,000	17
Belarus **(H)**	2,667	18
**Poland** **(H)**	2,056	19
North Macedonia	2,000	20
Finland	1,583	21
Turkey **(H)**	1,444	22

Teams entering preliminary round

Seeding position 1
Team	Coeff	Rank
**France**	1,278	23
Latvia **(H)**	1,222	24
Georgia **(H)**	1,028	25
Norway	1,000	26
Sweden	0,944	27
England	0,944	28
Greece	0,889	29

Seeding position 2
Team	Coeff	Rank
Moldova	0,750	30
Denmark	0,722	31
Montenegro	0,667	32
Bulgaria **(H)**	0,611	33
Switzerland	0,472	34
Armenia	0,444	35
Andorra	0,389	36

Seeding position 3
Team	Coeff	Rank
Lithuania **(H)**	0,389	37
Albania	0,333	38
Israel	0,333	39
Cyprus **(H)**	0,222	40
Wales **(H)**	0,222	41
Estonia	0,111	42
Gibraltar **(H)**	0,111	43

Seeding position 4
Team	Coeff	Rank
Malta	0,000	44
San Marino	0,000	45
Scotland	0,000	46
Germany	—	—
Kosovo	—	—

Notes

- Teams marked in **bold** have qualified for the final tournament.

Did not enter
Team	Coeff	Rank
Austria	—	—
Faroe Islands	—	—
Iceland	—	—
Liechtenstein	—	—
Luxembourg	—	—
Northern Ireland	—	—
Republic of Ireland	—	—

The draws for the preliminary round and main round were held on 21 October 2016, 14:30 CEST (UTC+2), at the UEFA headquarters in Nyon, Switzerland. The mechanism of the draws for each round was as follows:

- In the preliminary round, the 26 teams were drawn into seven groups: five groups of four containing one team from each of the seeding positions 1–4, and two groups of three containing one team from each of the seeding positions 1–3. First, the seven teams which were pre-selected as hosts were drawn from their own designated pot and allocated to their respective group as per their seeding positions. Next, the remaining 19 teams were drawn from their respective pot which were allocated according to their seeding positions.
- In the main round, the 28 teams were drawn into seven groups of four, containing one team from each of the seeding positions 1–3 and one group winner from the preliminary round. First, the seven teams which were pre-selected as hosts were drawn from their own designated pot and allocated to their respective group as per their seeding positions. Next, the remaining 21 teams (including the seven preliminary round winners, whose identity was not known at the time of the draw) were drawn from their respective pot which were allocated according to their seeding positions.

Based on the decisions taken by the UEFA Emergency Panel, Azerbaijan/Armenia, Spain/Gibraltar, Kosovo/Serbia, and Kosovo/Bosnia and Herzegovina would not be drawn into the same group. Should any of the above teams win their preliminary round group and qualify for a main round group with a team they cannot play against, they would be swapped with the next available team in their seeding position following the alphabetical order of the groups.

== Preliminary round ==
All times are CET (UTC+1).

=== Group A ===
Pos	Team	Pld	W	D	L	GF	GA	GD	Pts	Qualification
1	Georgia (H)	3	3	0	0	20	3	+17	9	Main round
2	Switzerland	3	2	0	1	12	8	+4	6	
3	Israel	3	1	0	2	6	8	−2	3	
4	Scotland	3	0	0	3	4	23	−19	0	

Source: UEFA
Rules for classification: Qualification tiebreakers
(H) Hosts
24 January 2017
14:30

Switzerland	6–2	Scotland
Wälty 4:05; Facchinetti 6:46; Buckson 7:18; Candreia 21:51; Silva 35:34; Sangines 35:49	Report	Davis 21:33; Muhsin 33:50

Olympic Palace, Tbilisi
Referee: Patrik Porkert (Austria), Yusif Nurullayev (Azerbaijan)
24 January 2017
17:00

Georgia	3–0	Israel
Tophuria 19:57; Maisaia 34:57; Kupatadze 38:45	Report

Olympic Palace, Tbilisi
Referee: Viktor Bugenko (Moldova), Swen Eichler (Germany)

25 January 2017
14:30

Israel	0–3	Switzerland
	Report	Facchinetti 11:38; Santona 14:25; Buckson 19:36 (d.p)

Olympic Palace, Tbilisi
Referee: Yusif Nurullayev (Azerbaijan), Swen Eichler (Germany)
25 January 2017
17:00

Georgia	11–0	Scotland
Sebiskveradze 0:56, 9:03, 14:36, 15:17; Mollison 17:08 (og); Tikurishvili 18:41 (d.p), 24:20; Nishnianidze 21:46; Bobokhidze 25:15, 34:23; Tophuria 33:56	Report

Olympic Palace, Tbilisi
Referee: Viktor Bugenko (Moldova), Patrik Porkert (Austria)

27 January 2017
14:30

Scotland	2–6	Israel
Muhsin 25:37; Yates 32:38	Report	T. Shkolnik 2:04, 17:24 (d.p), 20:09, 21:39, 36:06; Vana 11:49

Olympic Palace, Tbilisi
Referee: Yusif Nurullayev (Azerbaijan), Patrik Porkert (Austria)
27 January 2017
17:00

Switzerland	3–6	Georgia
Santona 20:47; Facchinetti 21:00, 32:07	Report	Todua 1:26; Sebiskveradze 7:22, 8:23; Chanukvadze 28:00; Tophuria 28:54; Kupatadze 35:35

Olympic Palace, Tbilisi
Referee: Swen Eichler (Germany), Viktor Bugenko (Moldova)

=== Group B ===
Pos	Team	Pld	W	D	L	GF	GA	GD	Pts	Qualification
1	Moldova	3	3	0	0	16	1	+15	9	Main round
2	Wales (H)	3	1	1	1	11	9	+2	4	
3	Greece	3	1	1	1	5	8	−3	4	
4	San Marino	3	0	0	3	3	17	−14	0	

Source: UEFA
Rules for classification: Qualification tiebreakers
(H) Hosts
26 January 2017
17:00

Greece	3–2	San Marino
Kondylatos 14:11, 38:52; Ntarlas 24:22	Report	Ercolani 37:46; Mourdoukoutas 39:36 (og)

The Point 4, Hereford
Referee: Andrej Topić (Croatia), Igor Puzović (Bosnia and Herzegovina)
26 January 2017
20:15

Wales	1–6	Moldova
Arsan 11:24	Report	Laşcu 6:15; Obadă 17:18, 18:27; Tacot 26:11; Negara 31:50; Burdujel 32:58

The Point 4, Hereford
Referee: Balázs Farkas (Hungary), Stefan Vrijens (Belgium)

27 January 2017
17:00

Moldova	4–0	Greece
Tacot 11:29; Obadă 13:13, 34:28; Chitoroagă 34:46	Report

The Point 4, Hereford
Referee: Stefan Vrijens (Belgium), Andrej Topić (Croatia)
27 January 2017
20:15

Wales	8–1	San Marino
Webbe 6:17, 22:08, 38:13 (d.p); Hesp 18:14, 30:45; Hugh 21:12, 27:18; Williams 22:29	Report	Busignani 28:38

The Point 4, Hereford
Referee: Igor Puzović (Bosnia and Herzegovina), Balázs Farkas (Hungary)

29 January 2017
17:00

San Marino	0–6	Moldova
	Report	Laşcu 4:27, 25:06, 26:58, 31:22; Podlesnov 12:49; Burdujel 35:16

The Point 4, Hereford
Referee: Balázs Farkas (Hungary), Stefan Vrijens (Belgium)
29 January 2017
20:15

Greece	2–2	Wales
Skoutelis 4:04; K. Panou 30:21	Report	Nelson 0:32; Zulkarnain 39:21

The Point 4, Hereford
Referee: Andrej Topić (Croatia), Igor Puzović (Bosnia and Herzegovina)

=== Group C ===
Pos	Team	Pld	W	D	L	GF	GA	GD	Pts	Qualification
1	Latvia (H)	3	2	1	0	11	6	+5	7	Main round
2	Armenia	3	2	0	1	11	8	+3	6	
3	Germany	3	1	1	1	11	12	−1	4	
4	Estonia	3	0	0	3	7	14	−7	0	

Source: UEFA
Rules for classification: Qualification tiebreakers
(H) Hosts
26 January 2017
15:30

Armenia	5–3	Germany
Karapetyan 6:47; Margaryan 7:35; Mashumyan 18:27; Galstyan 33:05; Nasibyan 39:58	Report	Di Giorgio 4:48; Winkel 10:46; Heinze 10:59

Olympic Sports Center of Zemgale, Jelgava
Attendance: 100
Referee: Michael Christofides (Cyprus), Maksim Dzeikala (Belarus)
26 January 2017
18:30

Latvia	4–2	Estonia
Jerofejevs 21:59, 28:52, 38:13; Ikstēns 33:49 (p)	Report	Grigorjev 10:48; Taska 39:39

Olympic Sports Center of Zemgale, Jelgava
Attendance: 500
Referee: Barry Weijers (Netherlands), Omar Rafiq (Norway)

27 January 2017
15:30

Estonia	1–5	Armenia
Veskimäe 31:59	Report	Galstyan 5:26; Karapetyan 10:31; Nasibyan 11:14; Mashumyan 12:10; Mardanyan 26:54

Olympic Sports Center of Zemgale, Jelgava
Attendance: 100
Referee: Omar Rafiq (Norway), Michael Christofides (Cyprus)
27 January 2017
18:30

Latvia	3–3	Germany
Meyer 1:45 (og); Seņs 1:58; Elezi 4:43 (og)	Report	Di Giorgio 34:35; Sözer 37:03; Winkel 38:53

Olympic Sports Center of Zemgale, Jelgava
Attendance: 750
Referee: Maksim Dzeikala (Belarus), Barry Weijers (Netherlands)

29 January 2017
13:00

Germany	5–4	Estonia
Winkel 1:42; Fiedler 2:57; Nickel 7:06; Heinze 25:55; Elezi 30:42	Report	Tšurilkin 12:40, 15:16; Taska 18:59; Aleksejev 32:09

Olympic Sports Center of Zemgale, Jelgava
Attendance: 100
Referee: Barry Weijers (Netherlands), Michael Christofides (Cyprus)
29 January 2017
16:00

Armenia	1–4	Latvia
Mashumyan 38:36	Report	Jerofejevs 4:01, 34:23; Aleksejevs 39:15; Mardanyan 39:58 (og)

Olympic Sports Center of Zemgale, Jelgava
Attendance: 1000
Referee: Omar Rafiq (Norway), Maksim Dzeikala (Belarus)

=== Group D ===
Pos	Team	Pld	W	D	L	GF	GA	GD	Pts	Qualification
1	Albania	3	3	0	0	15	4	+11	9	Main round
2	England	3	2	0	1	11	7	+4	6	
3	Bulgaria (H)	3	1	0	2	8	12	−4	3	
4	Malta	3	0	0	3	4	15	−11	0	

Source: UEFA
Rules for classification: Qualification tiebreakers
(H) Hosts
24 January 2017
16:30

England	6–1	Malta
Raoni Medina 2:02, 16:38; Ballinger 12:48; Kilman 19:07, 34:03; Wallace 22:40	Report	Mangion 6:20

Palace of Culture and Sports, Varna
Referee: Hennadiy Hora (Ukraine), Grigori Ošomkov (Estonia)
24 January 2017
19:00

Bulgaria	1–7	Albania
Stoykov 27:35	Report	A. Brahimi 12:37, 34:31; Selmanaj 13:57, 21:53, 32:55; Mullaj 39:01; A. Shkodra 39:56

Palace of Culture and Sports, Varna
Referee: Josip Barton (Macedonia), Damian Jaruchiewicz (Poland)

25 January 2017
16:30

Albania	5–1	England
Karaja 11:49; Selmanaj 12:10; A. Brahimi 24:52, 34:07; Halimi 29:50	Report	Ballinger 28:06

Palace of Culture and Sports, Varna
Referee: Grigori Ošomkov (Estonia), Josip Barton (Macedonia)
25 January 2017
19:00

Bulgaria	6–1	Malta
Stoykov 19:07, 29:01, 34:34, 39:02; M. Ivanov 33:14; Nestorov 34:54	Report	Sammut 36:54

Palace of Culture and Sports, Varna
Referee: Damian Jaruchiewicz (Poland), Hennadiy Hora (Ukraine)

27 January 2017
16:30

Malta	2–3	Albania
Azzopardi 11:37; Frendo 18:53	Report	Alibegu 9:46; A. Brahimi 24:20; Selmanaj 39:31

Palace of Culture and Sports, Varna
Referee: Grigori Ošomkov (Estonia), Damian Jaruchiewicz (Poland)
27 January 2017
19:00

England	4–1	Bulgaria
Ward 16:50, 22:26; Reed 34:08; Ballinger 39:33	Report	Shutev 39:17

Palace of Culture and Sports, Varna
Referee: Josip Barton (Macedonia), Hennadiy Hora (Ukraine)

=== Group E ===
Pos	Team	Pld	W	D	L	GF	GA	GD	Pts	Qualification
1	Denmark	3	2	0	1	6	5	+1	6 (Note: Head-to-head result: Kosovo 1–2 Denmark.)	Main round
2	Kosovo	3	2	0	1	9	4	+5	6	
3	Cyprus (H)	3	1	1	1	8	9	−1	4	
4	Norway	3	0	1	2	6	11	−5	1	

Source: UEFA
Rules for classification: Qualification tiebreakers
(H) Hosts
Notes:
30 January 2017
15:00

Norway	1–5	Kosovo
R. Maazouzi 19:16	Report	Goli 4:52, 39:28; Espegren 9:48 (og); Gjinovci 17:11; Alaj 28:05

Eleftheria Indoor Hall, Nicosia
Referee: Aleksandras Sliva (Lithuania), Daniel Deca (Romania)
30 January 2017
17:30

Cyprus	3–2	Denmark
Kouloumbris 9:03; G. Ioannou 22:06; Skampylis 39:53	Report	Jørgensen 3:01; Falck 24:11

Eleftheria Indoor Hall, Nicosia
Referee: Moshe Bohbot (Israel), Gerard Roure Ramirez (Andorra)

31 January 2017
15:00

Denmark	2–1	Norway
El-Ouaz 15:28, 19:21	Report	Moen 13:00

Eleftheria Indoor Hall, Nicosia
Referee: Gerard Roure Ramirez (Andorra), Aleksandras Sliva (Lithuania)
31 January 2017
17:30

Cyprus	1–3	Kosovo
Kouloumbris 9:43	Report	Selimi 14:59; Goli 15:43; Qerimi 25:55

Eleftheria Indoor Hall, Nicosia
Referee: Daniel Deca (Romania), Moshe Bohbot (Israel)

2 February 2017
15:00

Kosovo	1–2	Denmark
Dobroshi 7:47	Report	Mehlsen 29:08; Haagh 37:19

Eleftheria Indoor Hall, Nicosia
Referee: Moshe Bohbot (Israel), Aleksandras Sliva (Lithuania)
2 February 2017
17:30

Norway	4–4	Cyprus
Vucenovic 4:37; Abelsen 6:04; Ravlo 11:08; Schjetne 27:59 (p)	Report	Tsakanias 6:58; Kouloumbris 14:00; Manoli 30:11; Omirou 38:30

Eleftheria Indoor Hall, Nicosia
Referee: Gerard Roure Ramirez (Andorra), Daniel Deca (Romania)

=== Group F ===
Pos	Team	Pld	W	D	L	GF	GA	GD	Pts	Qualification
1	France	2	2	0	0	8	1	+7	6	Main round
2	Lithuania (H)	2	1	0	1	6	4	+2	3	
3	Andorra	2	0	0	2	1	10	−9	0	

Source: UEFA
Rules for classification: Qualification tiebreakers
(H) Hosts
27 January 2017
18:00

Lithuania	5–1	Andorra
Gulbinas 8:15; Radavičius 17:16; Zagurskas 25:05; Sendžikas 29:33; Buinickij 39:53	Report	D. Férriz 20:23

Siemens Arena, Vilnius
Referee: Fredric Nilholt (Sweden), Nuno Bogalho (Portugal)

28 January 2017
15:00

Andorra	0–5	France
	Report	Perez 2:46 (og); A. Mohammed 8:53, 29:57; Gasmi 17:48; Hamdoud 39:59 (p)

Siemens Arena, Vilnius
Referee: Kaloyan Kirilov (Bulgaria), Fredric Nilholt (Sweden)

29 January 2017
16:00

France	3–1	Lithuania
N'Gala 5:54; A. Mohammed 21:07; Belhaj 39:49	Report	Šteinas 9:23

Siemens Arena, Vilnius
Referee: Nuno Bogalho (Portugal), Kaloyan Kirilov (Bulgaria)

=== Group G ===
Pos	Team	Pld	W	D	L	GF	GA	GD	Pts	Qualification
1	Montenegro	2	2	0	0	19	5	+14	6	Main round
2	Sweden	2	1	0	1	9	12	−3	3	
3	Gibraltar (H)	2	0	0	2	2	13	−11	0	

Source: UEFA
Rules for classification: Qualification tiebreakers
(H) Hosts
28 January 2017
19:00

Gibraltar	1–8	Montenegro
El Andaloussi 8:56	Report	Il. Mugoša 1:56, 16:22; Perez 2:51 (og); Drašković 5:34, 21:10; Obradović 8:44; M. Bajčetić 28:26; Becanovic 39:23

Tercentenary Sports Hall, Gibraltar
Referee: Victor Berg-Audic (France), Vladimir Kadykov (Russia)

29 January 2017
19:00

Montenegro	11–4	Sweden
Bajović 4:22, 24:27, 27:56, 34:02; Il. Mugoša 8:20, 27:08; M. Bajčetić 13:30, 37:40; Drašković 15:47; Despotović 34:32 (p); Čalasan 39:33	Report	Ostojic 6:23; Bagger 34:51, 35:25; Legiec 37:07

Tercentenary Sports Hall, Gibraltar
Referee: Talgat Kosmukhambetov (Kazakhstan), Victor Berg-Audic (France)

30 January 2017
19:00

Sweden	5–1	Gibraltar
Söderqvist 4:26; Mönell 20:20; Legiec 36:27, 38:42; Rossi 39:46	Report	Lopez 2:44

Tercentenary Sports Hall, Gibraltar
Referee: Vladimir Kadykov (Russia), Talgat Kosmukhambetov (Kazakhstan)

== Main round ==
All times are CEST (UTC+2).

=== Group 1 ===
Note: Belarus were originally to host.

Pos	Team	Pld	W	D	L	GF	GA	GD	Pts	Qualification
1	Italy	3	2	1	0	8	5	+3	7	Final tournament
2	Georgia (H)	3	0	3	0	4	4	0	3	Play-offs
3	Belarus	3	0	2	1	5	6	−1	2	
4	Netherlands	3	0	2	1	6	8	−2	2	

Source: UEFA
Rules for classification: Qualification tiebreakers
(H) Hosts
8 April 2017
13:30

Italy	2–1	Belarus
Cavinato 30:13; Calderolli 31:23	Report	Zhigalko 26:22

Olympic Palace, Tbilisi
Referee: Admir Zahovič (Slovenia), Ozan Soykan (Turkey)
8 April 2017
16:00

Georgia	1–1	Netherlands
Sebiskveradze 5:40	Report	El Ghannouti 26:54

Olympic Palace, Tbilisi
Referee: Oleg Ivanov (Russia), Norbert Szilágyi (Hungary)

9 April 2017
13:30

Netherlands	2–4	Italy
El Morabiti 8:18; Bouzambou 13:01	Report	Honorio 7:40; Patias 8:00, 18:31; Bordignon 35:16

Olympic Palace, Tbilisi
Referee: Ozan Soykan (Turkey), Oleg Ivanov (Ukraine)
9 April 2017
16:00

Georgia	1–1	Belarus
Roninho 21:07	Report	Chernik 21:19

Olympic Palace, Tbilisi
Referee: Norbert Szilágyi (Hungary), Admir Zahovič (Slovenia)

11 April 2017
13:30

Belarus	3–3	Netherlands
Silivonchik 12:45; Zhigalko 13:28; Krikun 28:19	Report	Attaibi 7:30; Bouyouzan 11:08; St Juste 15:26

Olympic Palace, Tbilisi
Referee: Norbert Szilágyi (Hungary), Ozan Soykan (Turkey)
11 April 2017
16:00

Italy	2–2	Georgia
Romano 9:55; Miranda Boaventura 11:06	Report	Ercolessi 15:39 (og); Putano 24:19 (og)

Olympic Palace, Tbilisi
Referee: Oleg Ivanov (Russia), Admir Zahovič (Slovenia)

=== Group 2 ===
Pos	Team	Pld	W	D	L	GF	GA	GD	Pts	Qualification
1	Azerbaijan (H)	3	3	0	0	16	5	+11	9	Final tournament
2	Hungary	3	1	1	1	7	11	−4	4	Play-offs
3	Bosnia and Herzegovina	3	0	2	1	12	13	−1	2	
4	Albania	3	0	1	2	9	15	−6	1	

Source: UEFA
Rules for classification: Qualification tiebreakers
(H) Hosts
8 April 2017
14:00

Hungary	4–3	Albania
Rábl 6:18; Dávid 18:50; Dróth 30:43; Horváth 37:29	Report	Selmanaj 9:40; Mejzini 20:33; Karaja 36:31

Baku Sports Hall, Baku
Referee: Borislav Kolev (Bulgaria), Costas Nicolaou (Cyprus)
8 April 2017
16:30

Azerbaijan	5–4	Bosnia and Herzegovina
Eduardo 2:53; Everton Cardoso 17:46; Bolinha 18:42, 19:30, 32:36	Report	Markić 6:40, 15:29; Pavlović 18:07; S. Ivanković 39:29

Baku Sports Hall, Baku
Referee: Timo Onatsu (Finland), Lars Van Leeuwen (Netherlands)

9 April 2017
14:00

Bosnia and Herzegovina	2–2	Hungary
Mulahmetović 30:44; Pavlović 37:37	Report	Horváth 21:40; Dróth 25:05

Baku Sports Hall, Baku
Referee: Lukáš Peško (Slovakia), Borislav Kolev (Bulgaria)
9 April 2017
16:30

Azerbaijan	5–0	Albania
Everton Cardoso 2:02; Eduardo 25:24; Vassoura 27:01; Mammadkarimov 34:21; Baghirov 35:41	Report

Baku Sports Hall, Baku
Referee: Costas Nicolaou (Cyprus), Timo Onatsu (Finland)

11 April 2017
15:30

Albania	6–6	Bosnia and Herzegovina
Selmanaj 3:52, 12:44, 32:36; Duio 8:42, 28:19; A. Brahimi 39:50	Report	Bošković 2:59, 14:00; Milanović 10:22, 38:53; Gashi 17:57 (og); Aladžić 34:03 (p)

Baku Sports Hall, Baku
Referee: Costas Nicolaou (Cyprus), Lars Van Leeuwen (Netherlands)
11 April 2017
18:00

Hungary	1–6	Azerbaijan
Huseynli 1:16 (og)	Report	Bolinha 11:16; Eduardo 16:52; Fineo 21:03, 33:13; Baghirov 24:12; Atayev 35:08

Baku Sports Hall, Baku
Referee: Timo Onatsu (Finland), Borislav Kolev (Bulgaria)

=== Group 3 ===
Pos	Team	Pld	W	D	L	GF	GA	GD	Pts	Qualification
1	Ukraine (H)	3	3	0	0	7	3	+4	9	Final tournament
2	Croatia	3	2	0	1	11	3	+8	6	Play-offs
3	Belgium	3	1	0	2	3	8	−5	3	
4	Montenegro	3	0	0	3	3	10	−7	0	

Source: UEFA
Rules for classification: Qualification tiebreakers
(H) Hosts
8 April 2017
12:00

Croatia	4–0	Montenegro
Grcić 6:42; Suton 21:34; Novak 23:31; Marinović 30:40	Report

Kyiv Palace of Sports, Kyiv
Referee: Ondřej Černý (Czech Republic), Lukáš Peško (Slovakia)
8 April 2017
15:00

Ukraine	1–0	Belgium
Koval 14:37	Report

Kyiv Palace of Sports, Kyiv
Referee: Miguel Castilho (Portugal), Trayan Enchev (Bulgaria)

9 April 2017
12:00

Belgium	1–6	Croatia
Adnane 19:40	Report	Suton 4:33; Novak 10:14; Marinović 12:18, 24:30; Grcić 15:38; Matošević 36:18

Kyiv Palace of Sports, Kyiv
Referee: Lukáš Peško (Slovakia), Miguel Castilho (Portugal)
9 April 2017
15:00

Ukraine	4–2	Montenegro
Novak 3:12; Pediash 4:19; Shoturma 28:02; Zhurba 34:21	Report	Bajović 2:57, 7:37

Kyiv Palace of Sports, Kyiv
Referee: Trayan Enchev (Bulgaria), Ondřej Černý (Czech Republic)

11 April 2017
15:00

Montenegro	1–2	Belgium
Bajović 10:37	Report	Dahbi Reda 4:43; Zaaf 34:18

Kyiv Palace of Sports, Kyiv
Referee: Lukáš Peško (Slovakia), Trayan Enchev (Bulgaria)
11 April 2017
18:00

Croatia	1–2	Ukraine
Jelovčić 11:27	Report	Bilotserkivets 13:48; Razuvanov 36:40

Kyiv Palace of Sports, Kyiv
Referee: Ondřej Černý (Czech Republic), Miguel Castilho (Portugal)

=== Group 4 ===
Pos	Team	Pld	W	D	L	GF	GA	GD	Pts	Qualification
1	Portugal	3	3	0	0	11	2	+9	9	Final tournament
2	Romania (H)	3	1	1	1	8	10	−2	4	Play-offs
3	Finland	3	1	1	1	10	13	−3	4	
4	Latvia	3	0	0	3	5	9	−4	0	

Source: UEFA
Rules for classification: Qualification tiebreakers
(H) Hosts
8 April 2017
15:30

Portugal	2–1	Latvia
Bruno Coelho 29:19, 30:40	Report	Jerofejevs 14:51

Polyvalent Hall, Călărași
Attendance: 400
Referee: Cédric Pelissier (France), Alejandro Martinez Flores (Spain)
8 April 2017
18:00

Romania	5–5	Finland
Răducu 11:19; M. Matei 22:06; F. Matei 32:46 (p), 40:00 (d.p); A. Csoma 39:56	Report	Jyrkiäinen 5:19; Tirkkonen 19:47; Autio 20:13, 30:52; Teittinen 22:31

Polyvalent Hall, Călărași
Attendance: 1000
Referee: Ivan Shabanov (Russia), Elchin Samadli (Azerbaijan)

9 April 2017
15:30

Finland	1–5	Portugal
Autio 33:36	Report	Pany Varela 7:59, 13:12; Tiago Brito 12:13; Fábio Cecílio 29:55; Bruno Coelho 38:27

Polyvalent Hall, Călărași
Attendance: 200
Referee: Elchin Samadli (Azerbaijan), Cédric Pelissier (France)
9 April 2017
18:00

Romania	3–1	Latvia
F. Matei 18:50, 37:53; Szöcs 24:17	Report	Jerofejevs 37:25

Polyvalent Hall, Călărași
Attendance: 1000
Referee: Alejandro Martinez Flores (Spain), Ivan Shabanov (Russia)

11 April 2017
14:30

Latvia	3–4	Finland
Avanesovs 17:09 (p); Seņs 18:29 (d.p); Ikstēns 27:10	Report	Hosio 8:42; Tirkkonen 19:40; Autio 20:31; M. Kytölä 33:17

Polyvalent Hall, Călărași
Attendance: 150
Referee: Cédric Pelissier (France), Elchin Samadli (Azerbaijan)
11 April 2017
17:00

Portugal	4–0	Romania
Bruno Coelho 0:17, 4:14; Márcio Moreira 14:15; João Matos 39:34	Report

Polyvalent Hall, Călărași
Attendance: 1200
Referee: Alejandro Martinez Flores (Spain), Ivan Shabanov (Russia)

=== Group 5 ===
Pos	Team	Pld	W	D	L	GF	GA	GD	Pts	Qualification
1	Spain	3	2	1	0	14	1	+13	7	Final tournament
2	Serbia	3	2	0	1	11	9	+2	6	Play-offs
3	Poland (H)	3	1	1	1	5	7	−2	4	Play-offs
4	Moldova	3	0	0	3	5	18	−13	0	

Source: UEFA
Rules for classification: Qualification tiebreakers
(H) Hosts
8 April 2017
15:00

Spain	7–0	Moldova
José Ruiz 8:37; Laşcu 11:57 (og); Lin 17:02; Tolrà 22:09; Raúl Campos 28:29, 30:43; Solano León 35:55	Report

Municipal Sport Hall, Elbląg
Referee: Grigori Zelentsov (Russia), Guy Berger (Israel)
8 April 2017
20:00

Poland	0–4	Serbia
	Report	Kocić 14:12; Simić 26:00, 32:13; Pršić 30:30

Municipal Sport Hall, Elbląg
Referee: Eduardo Fernandes Coelho (Portugal), Angelo Galante (Italy)

9 April 2017
15:00

Serbia	0–6	Spain
	Report	Ortiz 2:38; Raúl Campos 3:32; Bebe 17:12; Adri 20:08; Adolfo 26:58; Pola 39:52

Municipal Sport Hall, Elbląg
Referee: Angelo Galante (Italy), Grigori Zelentsov (Russia)
9 April 2017
20:00

Poland	4–2	Moldova
Mikołajewicz 5:15; Zastawnik 9:10; Mizgajski 15:17; Kubik 27:41	Report	Neagu 4:30; Laşcu 14:32

Municipal Sport Hall, Elbląg
Referee: Guy Berger (Israel), Eduardo Fernandes Coelho (Portugal)

11 April 2017
15:00

Moldova	3–7	Serbia
Tacot 26:55; Negara 30:29; Kocić 36:14 (og)	Report	Simić 4:05, 10:40; Tomić 11:54, 14:22, 19:42; Rajčević 20:53, 35:35

Municipal Sport Hall, Elbląg
Referee: Guy Berger (Israel), Grigori Zelentsov (Russia)
11 April 2017
20:00

Spain	1–1	Poland
Bebe 1:58	Report	Mikołajewicz 17:46

Municipal Sport Hall, Elbląg
Referee: Eduardo Fernandes Coelho (Portugal), Angelo Galante (Italy)

=== Group 6 ===
Pos	Team	Pld	W	D	L	GF	GA	GD	Pts	Qualification
1	Kazakhstan (H)	3	3	0	0	11	0	+11	9	Final tournament
2	Czech Republic	3	2	0	1	12	10	+2	6	Play-offs
3	North Macedonia	3	1	0	2	7	13	−6	3	
4	Denmark	3	0	0	3	7	14	−7	0	

Source: UEFA
Rules for classification: Qualification tiebreakers
(H) Hosts
8 April 2017
11:30

Czech Republic	5–4	Denmark
Záruba 5:14, 39:57; Slováček 7:00; El-Ouaz 15:00 (og); Seidler 37:06	Report	El-Ouaz 10:29; Jørgensen 19:06 (d.p); Badran 23:35; Veis 32:06

Almaty Arena, Almaty
Referee: Gerd Bylois (Belgium), Kirill Naishouler (Finland)
8 April 2017
14:00

Kazakhstan	3–0	North Macedonia
Leo 12:38; Zhamankulov 18:17; Akbalikov 32:54	Report

Almaty Arena, Almaty
Referee: Kamil Çetin (Turkey), Vasilios Christodoulis (Greece)

9 April 2017
11:30

North Macedonia	3–7	Czech Republic
Marinho de Souza 2:17, 39:04 (d.p); Petrović 31:41	Report	Záruba 4:05, 28:06; Rešetár 19:37, 21:43, 30:00, 36:31; Koudelka 23:31

Almaty Arena, Almaty
Referee: Vasilios Christodoulis (Greece), Gerd Bylois (Belgium)
9 April 2017
14:00

Kazakhstan	5–0	Denmark
Zhamankulov 3:27; Leo 8:23; Pershin 16:25; Douglas Júnior 16:36; Suleimenov 39:40	Report

Almaty Arena, Almaty
Referee: Kirill Naishouler (Finland), Kamil Çetin (Turkey)

11 April 2017
13:00

Denmark	3–4	North Macedonia
Falck 3:56; Mengel 16:51; El-Ouaz 25:44	Report	Seferi 12:16, 15:23; Micevski 22:47; Petrović 35:38

Almaty Arena, Almaty
Referee: Kamil Çetin (Turkey), Kirill Naishouler (Finland)
11 April 2017
15:30

Czech Republic	0–3	Kazakhstan
	Report	Douglas Júnior 4:26, 38:00; Pershin 19:01

Almaty Arena, Almaty
Referee: Gerd Bylois (Belgium), Vasilios Christodoulis (Greece)

=== Group 7 ===
Pos	Team	Pld	W	D	L	GF	GA	GD	Pts	Qualification
1	Russia	3	3	0	0	10	0	+10	9	Final tournament
2	France	3	2	0	1	9	7	+2	6	Play-offs
3	Slovakia	3	1	0	2	9	6	+3	3	
4	Turkey (H)	3	0	0	3	2	17	−15	0	

Source: UEFA
Rules for classification: Qualification tiebreakers
(H) Hosts
8 April 2017
11:00

Turkey	1–8	Slovakia
Cihan Özcan 6:37	Report	Drahovský 2:14; Doša 3:59; Kyjovský 11:17, 23:00, 35:04; Bahna 23:58; Rick 32:24; Belaník 32:37

Gazanfer Bilge Sports Hall, Büyükçekmece
Referee: Marc Birkett (England), Juan Gallardo (Spain)
8 April 2017
13:30

Russia	5–0	France
Eder Lima 1:09, 6:16; Robinho 6:27; Afanasyev 16:44; Chishkala 21:23	Report

Gazanfer Bilge Sports Hall, Büyükçekmece
Referee: Tomasz Frak (Poland), Jan Kresta (Czech Republic)

9 April 2017
11:00

Turkey	1–5	France
Onur Mengi 37:31	Report	N'Gala 12:13; Gasmi 17:37, 21:25, 30:30; A. Mohammed 26:50

Gazanfer Bilge Sports Hall, Büyükçekmece
Referee: Jan Kresta (Czech Republic), Marc Birkett (England)
9 April 2017
13:30

Slovakia	0–1	Russia
	Report	Robinho 36:17

Gazanfer Bilge Sports Hall, Büyükçekmece
Referee: Juan Gallardo (Spain), Tomasz Frak (Poland)

11 April 2017
11:00

France	4–1	Slovakia
Belhaj 29:49, 35:00; A. Mohammed 30:11, 33:53	Report	Drahovský 12:05

Gazanfer Bilge Sports Hall, Büyükçekmece
Referee: Juan Gallardo (Spain), Jan Kresta (Czech Republic)
11 April 2017
13:30

Russia	4–0	Turkey
Abramovich 13:03; Robinho 15:46; Davydov 22:26; Eder Lima 26:56	Report

Gazanfer Bilge Sports Hall, Büyükçekmece
Referee: Marc Birkett (England), Tomasz Frak (Poland)

=== Ranking of third-placed teams ===
Pos	Grp	Team	Pld	W	D	L	GF	GA	GD	Pts	Qualification
1	5	Poland	3	1	1	1	5	7	−2	4	Play-offs
2	4	Finland	3	1	1	1	10	13	−3	4	
3	7	Slovakia	3	1	0	2	9	6	+3	3	
4	3	Belgium	3	1	0	2	3	8	−5	3	
5	6	North Macedonia	3	1	0	2	7	13	−6	3	
6	2	Bosnia and Herzegovina	3	0	2	1	12	13	−1	2	
7	1	Belarus	3	0	2	1	5	6	−1	2	

Source: UEFA
Rules for classification: 1) points; 2) goal difference; 3) goals scored; 4) disciplinary points; 5) coefficient; 6) drawing of lots.

== Play-offs ==
The draw for the play-offs was held on 6 July 2017, 13:30 CEST, at the UEFA headquarters in Nyon, Switzerland. There were no seedings, with the only restriction that the best third-placed team (Poland) could not be drawn against the runner-up from the same main round group (Serbia).

All times are CEST (UTC+2).

Team 1	Agg.	Team 2	1st leg	2nd leg
Czech Republic	7–8	Serbia	3–4	4–4
France	6–5	Croatia	1–1	5–4
Romania	9–6	Georgia	2–2	7–4
Hungary	6–7	Poland	2–1	4–6

12 September 2017
18:30

Czech Republic	3–4	Serbia
Seidler 3:50, 35:31; Cupák 32:49	Report	Kocić 12:50; Perić 23:17, 27:36; Rakić 26:23

Městská sportovní hala Chomutov, Chomutov
Referee: Angelo Galante (Italy), Alessandro Malfer (Italy)
26 September 2017
18:30

Serbia	4–4	Czech Republic
Ramić 9:04; Rajčević 23:25; Pršić 25:50; Simić 33:38	Report	Záruba 12:24; Seidler 30:25, 31:21; Vahala (38:45)

Čair Sports Center, Niš
Referee: Juan Gallardo (Spain), Alejandro Martinez Flores (Spain)

Serbia won 8–7 on aggregate and qualified for the final tournament.

12 September 2017
20:30

France	1–1	Croatia
Alla 6:23	Report	Jelovčić 33:34

Davo Pévèle Arena, Orchies
Referee: Gábor Kovács (Hungary), Balázs Farkas (Hungary)
26 September 2017
19:00

Croatia	4–5	France
Suton 7:02; Perić 15:17; Marinović 34:18; Novak 39:44	Report	Kebe 8:49; Ramirez 25:07; N'Gala 32:17, 33:24, 39:51

Športska dvorana Gospino polje, Dubrovnik
Referee: Marc Birkett (England), Kamil Çetin (Turkey)

France won 6–5 on aggregate and qualified for the final tournament.

12 September 2017
18:00

Romania	2–2	Georgia
Sávio Valadares 24:09, 24:59	Report	Kurtanidze 9:44; Kakabadze 14:29

Deva Sports Hall, Deva
Referee: Eduardo Fernandes Coelho (Portugal), Nuno Bogalho (Portugal)
26 September 2017
18:30

Georgia	4–7	Romania
Kakabadze 5:51; Sebiskveradze 6:33, 11:35; Kurtanidze 22:48	Report	Sávio Valadares 3:41, 21:07, 26:34, 36:43; Paulo Ferreira 12:06; Stoica 20:00; Răducu 34:20

Olympic Palace, Tbilisi
Referee: Ondřej Černý (Czech Republic), Timo Onatsu (Finland)

Romania won 9–6 on aggregate and qualified for the final tournament.

12 September 2017
18:00

Hungary	2–1	Poland
Horváth 11:42; Dróth 22:20 (p)	Report	Lutecki 31:32

Generali Arena, Miskolc
Referee: Bogdan Sorescu (Romania), Oleg Ivanov (Ukraine)
26 September 2017
18:30

Poland	6–4	Hungary
Franz 5:31, 5:42; Wojciechowski 26:44; Kubik 31:51, 33:24; Solecki 35:01	Report	Horváth 7:40; Dróth 13:16, 39:35; Hosszú 35:18

Hala Widowiskowo-Sportowa w Koszalinie, Koszalin
Referee: Saša Tomić (Croatia), Nikola Jelić (Croatia)

Poland won 7–6 on aggregate and qualified for the final tournament.

== Qualified teams ==
The following 12 teams qualified for the final tournament.

Team	Qualified as	Qualified on	Previous appearances in Futsal Euro^{1}
Slovenia	Hosts	26 January 2015	5 (2003, 2010, 2012, 2014, 2016)
Italy	Main round Group 1 winners	9 April 2017	10 (1996, 1999, 2001, **2003**, 2005, 2007, 2010, 2012, **2014**, 2016)
Azerbaijan	Main round Group 2 winners	11 April 2017	4 (2010, 2012, 2014, 2016)
Ukraine	Main round Group 3 winners	11 April 2017	9 (1996, 2001, 2003, 2005, 2007, 2010, 2012, 2014, 2016)
Portugal	Main round Group 4 winners	11 April 2017	8 (1999, 2003, 2005, 2007, 2010, 2012, 2014, 2016)
Spain	Main round Group 5 winners	11 April 2017	10 (**1996**, 1999, **2001**, 2003, **2005**, **2007**, **2010**, **2012**, 2014, **2016**)
Kazakhstan	Main round Group 6 winners	11 April 2017	1 (2016)
Russia	Main round Group 7 winners	9 April 2017	10 (1996, **1999**, 2001, 2003, 2005, 2007, 2010, 2012, 2014, 2016)
Serbia	Play-off winners	26 September 2017	5 (1999, 2007, 2010, 2012, 2016)
France	Play-off winners	26 September 2017	0 (debut)
Romania	Play-off winners	26 September 2017	3 (2007, 2012, 2014)
Poland	Play-off winners	26 September 2017	1 (2001)

^{1} Bold indicates champions for that year. Italic indicates hosts for that year.

== Top goalscorers ==
The following players scored six goals or more in the qualifying competition:

9 goals

- (Albania) Halim Selmanaj
- (Georgia (country)) Archil Sebiskveradze

7 goals

- (Latvia) Artūrs Jerofejevs
- (Montenegro) Bojan Bajović

6 goals

- (Albania) Azem Brahimi
- (France) Abdessamad Mohammed
- (Romania) Sávio Valadares

Source: UEFA.com
