= Georgia national futsal team =

Georgia
- Nickname(s): ჯვაროსნები Jvarosnebi (Crusaders)
- Association: Georgian Football Federation
- Confederation: UEFA (Europe)
- Head coach: (Georgia (country)) Avtandil Asatiani
- Home stadium: Tbilisi Sports Palace
- FIFA code: GEO
- FIFA ranking: 21 ▼1 (24 September 2026)
- Highest FIFA ranking: 14 (May 2024 – April 2025)
Home colours	Away colours

First international
- Italy 3–1 Georgia (Georgia (country)) (Turin, Italy; October 23, 1995)

Biggest win
- Georgia 15–1 Gibraltar (Chișinău, Moldova; October 22, 2015)

Biggest defeat
- Portugal 18–1 Georgia (Georgia (country)) (Altura, Portugal; July 4, 2008)

FIFA World Cup
- Appearances: 0

UEFA Futsal Championship
- Appearances: 2 (First in 2022)
- Best result: Quarter-finals (2022)

The Georgia national futsal team is controlled by the Georgian Football Federation, the governing body for futsal in Georgia and represents the country in international futsal competitions, such as the World Cup and the European Championships.

== Tournament records ==
=== FIFA Futsal World Cup ===
FIFA Futsal World Cup record								Qualification record						
Year	Round	Pld	W	D	L	GF	GA	Outcome	Pld	W	D	L	GF	GA
(Netherlands) 1989	Part of Soviet Union							-	-	-	-	-	-	-
(Hong Kong) 1992	Did not enter							-	-	-	-	-	-	-
(Spain) 1996	Did not qualify							Group B 6th place	5	1	0	4	21	37
(Guatemala) 2000	Did not qualify							Group D 4th place	4	1	1	2	17	21
(Chinese Taipei) 2004	Did not qualify							Group 1 3rd place	3	1	0	2	9	16
(Brazil) 2008	Did not qualify							Group 3 3rd place	2	0	0	2	2	21
(Thailand) 2012	Did not qualify							Group A runner up	3	1	2	0	14	4
(Colombia) 2016	Did not qualify							Group A runner up	3	2	1	0	20	4
(Lithuania) 2021	Did not qualify							Group 1 3rd place	6	4	0	2	25	13
(Uzbekistan) 2024	Did not qualify							Group E 3rd place	10	6	0	6	28	32
Total	0/9	0	0	0	0	0	0	8/10	36	16	4	18	136	148

=== UEFA European Futsal Championship ===
UEFA Futsal Euro record								Qualification record						
Year	Round	Pld	W	D	L	GF	GA	Outcome	Pld	W	D	L	GF	GA
(Spain) 1996	Did not qualify							Group B 6th place	5	1	0	4	21	37
(Spain) 1999	Did not qualify							Group F runner up	3	2	0	1	15	13
(Russia) 2001	Did not qualify							Group G 3rd place	2	0	0	2	3	17
(Italy) 2003	Did not qualify							Group E 4th place	3	0	1	2	3	17
(Czech Republic) 2005	Did not qualify							Group E 4th place	3	0	0	3	7	27
(Portugal) 2007	Did not qualify							Group C 3rd place	3	1	0	2	7	10
(Hungary) 2010	Did not qualify							Group 4 3rd place	6	3	0	3	11	18
(Croatia) 2012	Did not qualify							Group C runner up	3	2	0	1	13	2
(Belgium) 2014	Did not qualify							Group 6 3rd place	5	2	1	2	23	20
(Serbia) 2016	Did not qualify							Group 7 4th place	6	2	1	3	16	21
(Slovenia) 2018	Did not qualify							Play-offs	8	3	4	1	30	16
(Netherlands) 2022	Quarterfinals	4	2	0	2	6	14	Group 2 runner up	9	6	1	2	33	19
(Latvia) (Lithuania) (Slovenia) 2026	Group stage	3	0	1	2	3	9	Play-offs	8	6	1	1	29	17
Total:2/13	Quarterfinals	7	2	1	4	9	23	13/13	64	28	9	27	211	234

== Players ==
=== Current squad ===
The following players were called up to the squad for the UEFA 2024 FIFA Futsal World Cup qualification matches against Armenia and Portugal on 15 and 20 September 2023, respectively.
Caps and goals updated as of 8 March 2023, after the match against Belgium.
Head coach: Avtandil Asatiani

No.	Pos.	Player	Date of birth (age)	Caps	Goals	Club
1	GK	Zviad Kupatadze (captain)	30 October 1979 (age 47)	62	5	(Russian Football Union) Gazprom-Ugra Yugorsk
12	GK	Tornike Bukia	15 May 1994 (age 32)	74	2	(Kazakhstan Football Federation) MFC Aktobe
2	DF	Chaguinha	25 July 1988 (age 38)	19	1	(Royal Spanish Football Federation) Palma Futsal
6	DF	Vilian Lourenço	11 June 1989 (age 37)	11	3	(Royal Spanish Football Federation) Palma Futsal
7	DF	Shota Tophuria	15 May 1990 (age 36)	78	10	(Georgian Football Federation) New Vision Georgians
9	DF	Irakli Todua	7 September 1990 (age 36)	80	25	(Georgian Football Federation) New Vision Georgians
16	DF	Thales Feitosa	13 April 1988 (age 38)	37	27	(Brazilian Football Confederation) Cascavel Futsal
17	DF	Fernando Drasler	20 June 1988 (age 38)	8	7	(Brazilian Football Confederation) JEC Krona Futsal
18	DF	Bynho	22 November 1992 (age 33)	15	4	(Royal Spanish Football Federation) Viña Albali Valdepeñas
3	FW	Chimba	6 November 1994 (age 32)	0	0	(Russian Football Union) Gazprom-Ugra Yugorsk
5	FW	Giorgi Ghavtadze	30 October 2000 (age 26)	28	3	(Russian Football Union) MFK Tyumen
8	FW	Vakhtang Kekelia	10 September 1989 (age 37)	45	10	(Georgian Football Federation) New Vision Georgians
10	FW	Roninho	4 April 1987 (age 39)	54	16	(Georgian Football Federation) New Vision Georgians
11	FW	Vakhtang Jvarashvili	30 August 1994 (age 32)	63	11	(Georgian Football Federation) New Vision Georgians
14	FW	Bruno Gomes	24 May 1996 (age 30)	3	3	(Royal Spanish Football Federation) Palma Futsal
15	FW	Simi Saiotti	15 February 1987 (age 39)	20	22	(Portuguese Football Federation) Eléctrico

=== Recent call-ups ===
The following players have also been called up to the squad within the last 12 months.

Pos.	Player	Date of birth (age)	Caps	Goals	Club	Latest call-up
^{COV} Player withdrew from the squad due to contracting COVID-19.^{INJ} Player withdrew from the squad due to an injury.^{PRE} Preliminary squad.^{RET} Retired from international futsal.

== Georgia vs opponent ==
The following table shows Georgia‘a all-time international record, correct as of 16 April 2025.

Opponent	Play	Wins	Draws	Losses	Goals for	Goals against
Albania	1	1	0	0	3	0
Andorra	1	1	0	0	3	1
Angola	1	0	0	1	2	3
Armenia	6	3	1	2	14	11
Austria	3	3	0	0	21	8
Azerbaijan	14	7	1	6	37	48
Belarus	7	3	3	1	15	14
Belgium	4	3	1	0	16	8
Bosnia and Herzegovina	1	1	0	0	2	1
Bulgaria	2	2	0	0	11	2
Croatia	5	0	1	4	5	22
Cyprus	1	0	0	1	1	4
Czech Republic	4	0	1	3	7	19
Denmark	1	1	0	0	6	2
England	6	5	1	0	28	9
Estonia	6	6	0	0	41	6
Finland	3	0	0	3	2	15
France	10	3	3	4	32	32
Germany	6	6	0	0	24	5
Gibraltar	1	1	0	0	15	1
Greece	3	1	0	2	11	10
Hungary	3	1	1	1	8	18
Iran	2	2	0	0	6	2
Israel	2	2	0	0	10	0
Italy	5	0	1	4	8	23
Kazakhstan	6	1	0	5	11	17
Kyrgyzstan	4	1	2	1	8	8
Kosovo	4	3	0	1	14	6
Libya	1	0	0	1	1	4
Lebanon	2	2	0	0	3	1
Latvia	5	2	1	2	13	16
Lithuania	9	7	2	0	40	12
North Macedonia	3	0	0	3	6	13
Malta	5	5	0	0	37	4
Moldova	9	6	3	0	34	21
Netherlands	4	0	3	1	6	10
Poland	3	1	0	2	6	9
Portugal	12	1	0	11	10	83
Romania	12	5	2	5	31	43
Russia	5	0	0	5	6	27
Scotland	1	1	0	0	11	0
Serbia	7	1	1	5	13	30
Slovenia	1	0	0	1	0	5
Slovakia	4	2	1	1	11	9
Spain	7	0	0	7	6	67
Switzerland	3	2	1	0	13	7
Tajikistan	2	2	0	0	16	3
Turkey	5	3	1	1	13	11
Ukraine	3	1	0	2	12	19
United Arab Emirates	2	2	0	0	7	3
Uzbekistan	2	0	1	1	3	6
51 Countries	219	100	32	87	659	698
