= 2008 FIFA Futsal World Cup qualification (UEFA) =

- Dates
- Teams: (from 1 confederation)

Listed below are the dates and results for the 2008 FIFA Futsal World Cup qualification rounds for UEFA teams. A total of 38 teams took part, divided in 10 Groups - eight groups of 4 teams each and two groups of 3 teams each - competing for 6 places in the World Cup.

== Qualifying first round ==
From 23 February to 2 March 2008

=== Group 1 ===
Was held in Pionir Hall - Belgrade, Serbia

Teams	GP	W	D	L	GF	GA	GD	Pts
Russia	1	1	0	0	3	2	1	3
Serbia	1	0	0	1	2	3	-1	0
France*	0	0	0	0	0	0	0	0

*France didn't attend the tournament

=== Group 2 ===
Was held in JU KSC "Mladost" - Visoko, Bosnia-Herzegovina

Teams	GP	W	D	L	GF	GA	GD	Pts
Bosnia and Herzegovina	3	2	1	0	18	4	14	7
Lithuania	3	1	2	0	11	4	7	5
Netherlands	3	1	1	1	18	8	10	4
Estonia	3	0	0	3	1	32	-31	0

=== Group 3 ===
Was held in Pabellón Multiusos Ciudad de Cáceres - Cáceres, Spain

Teams	GP	W	D	L	GF	GA	GD	Pts
Spain	2	2	0	0	16	2	+14	6
Croatia	2	1	0	1	9	4	+5	3
Georgia	2	0	0	2	2	21	-19	0

=== Group 4 ===
Was held in Gyöngyösi Városi Sport es Rendezvény Csarnok - Gyöngyös, Hungary

Teams	GP	W	D	L	GF	GA	GD	Pts
Hungary	3	3	0	0	24	2	+22	9
Poland	3	2	0	1	18	10	+8	6
Macedonia	3	1	0	2	6	10	-4	3
England	3	0	0	3	3	29	-26	0

=== Group 5 ===
Was held in Romeo Iamandi - Buzau, Romania

Teams	GP	W	D	L	GF	GA	GD	Pts
Belarus	3	2	1	0	12	4	+8	7
Romania	3	2	1	0	10	7	+3	7
Belgium	3	1	0	2	12	11	+1	3
Montenegro	3	0	0	3	4	16	-12	0

=== Group 6 ===
Was held in Zimní Stadión - Chrudim, Czech Republic

Teams	GP	W	D	L	GF	GA	GD	Pts
Czech Republic	3	3	0	0	11	3	+8	9
Azerbaijan	3	2	0	1	15	6	+9	6
Finland	3	1	0	2	4	10	-6	3
Armenia	3	0	0	3	1	12	-11	0

=== Group 7 ===
Was held in Hibernians Pavillon - Corradino - Paola, Malta

Teams	GP	W	D	L	GF	GA	GD	Pts
Slovenia	3	3	0	0	18	1	+17	9
Albania	3	2	0	1	9	9	0	6
Greece	3	1	0	2	9	11	-2	3
Malta	3	0	0	3	2	17	-15	0

=== Group 8 ===
Was held in Giovanni Paolo II - Pescara, Italy

Teams	GP	W	D	L	GF	GA	GD	Pts
Italy	3	3	0	0	28	2	+26	9
Kazakhstan	3	2	0	1	10	11	-1	6
Cyprus	3	1	0	2	10	25	-15	3
Andorra	3	0	0	3	7	17	-10	0

=== Group 9 ===
Was held in Ugur Inan Spor Salonu - Aydin, Turkey

Teams	GP	W	D	L	GF	GA	GD	Pts
Portugal	3	3	0	0	10	2	+8	9
Slovakia	3	2	0	1	8	5	+3	6
Turkey	3	1	0	2	7	9	-2	3
Latvia	3	0	0	3	2	11	-9	0

Slovensko Slovensko 4 : 2 Turecko Turecko

28. február Portugalsko Portugalsko 4 : 0 Lotyšsko Lotyšsko

29. február Lotyšsko Lotyšsko 2 : 3 Turecko Turecko

29. február Slovensko Slovensko 0 : 3 Portugalsko Portugalsko

2. marec Lotyšsko Lotyšsko 0 : 4 Slovensko Slovensko

2. marec Portugalsko Portugalsko 3 : 2 Turecko Turecko

=== Group 10 ===
Was held in Palace of Culture and Sports - Varna, Bulgaria

Teams	GP	W	D	L	GF	GA	GD	Pts
Ukraine	3	3	0	0	14	3	+11	9
Israel	3	2	0	1	5	4	+1	6
Moldova	3	1	0	2	2	7	-5	3
Bulgaria	3	0	0	3	3	10	-7	0

== Play-offs ==
=== 1st leg ===
From 29 March to 2 April 2008

Czech Republic	1 - 1	Romania

Arena Pardubice, Pardubice, Czech Republic

Belarus	1 - 5	Russia

Sports Hall SCA, Minsk, Belarus

Italy	6 - 3	Croatia

Giovanni Paolo II, Pescara, Italy

Spain	9 - 1	Bosnia and Herzegovina

Pabellón "Javier Lozano Cid", Toledo, Spain

Slovenia	1 - 6	Portugal

Hala Tivoli, Ljubljana, Slovenia

Ukraine	3 - 1	Hungary

Palace of Sport "Lokomotiv", Kharkiv, Ukraine

=== 2nd leg ===
From 12 to 16 April 2008

Romania	2 - 2	Czech Republic

Târgu Mureş, Târgu Mureș, Romania

Czech Republic won 3–3 on aggregate (Away Goals).

Russia	1 - 1	Belarus

Central Hall, Shchyolkovo, Russia

Russia won 6–2 on aggregate.

Croatia	0 - 3	Italy

Dom Sportova Ploce, Ploče, Croatia

Italy won 9–3 on aggregate.

Bosnia and Herzegovina	0 - 4	Spain

JU KSC "Mladost", Visoko, Bosnia and Herzegovina

Spain won 13–1 on aggregate.

Portugal	3 - 0	Slovenia

Pavilhão Açoreana Seguros, Lisbon, Portugal

Portugal won 9–1 on aggregate.

Hungary	4 - 3	Ukraine

Gyöngyösi Városi Sport es Rendezvény Csarnok, Gyöngyös, Hungary

Ukraine won 6–5 on aggregate.

== Qualified teams ==
1. Spain
2. Portugal
3. Italy
4. Russia
5. Ukraine
6. Czech Republic
