= 2003 UEFA Futsal Championship squads =

This article lists the confirmed national futsal squads for the 2003 UEFA Futsal Championship tournament held in Italy.
