= Albania national futsal team =

Albania
- Nickname(s): Kuq e Zinjtë (The Red and Blacks); Shqiponjat (The Eagles)
- Association: Federata Shqiptare e Futbollit (FSHF)
- Confederation: UEFA (Europe)
- Head coach: Erind Resuli
- Captain: Roald Halimi
- Most caps: Roald Halimi (20)
- Top scorer: Roald Halimi (11)
- FIFA code: ALB
- FIFA ranking: 87 (24 September 2026)
Home colours	Away colours

First international
- Albania 4 - 13 Greece (Braga, Portugal; 7 November 2003)

Biggest win
- San Marino 0 - 11 Albania (Ciorescu, Moldova; 17 January 2015)

Biggest defeat
- Portugal 18 - 6 Albania (Braga, Portugal; 8 November 2003)

FIFA World Cup
- Appearances: 0

European Championship
- Appearances: 0

The Albanian national futsal team represents Albania in international futsal competitions and is controlled by the Albanian Football Association. The team debuted in the 2005 UEFA Futsal Championship qualifiers. They won the first match 8–6 against England, and then they drew to Cyprus, but failed to qualify because of goal difference. In the 2007 UEFA Futsal Championship qualifiers, Albania performed badly, losing all of its matches and finishing last in its group. In the 2008 FIFA Futsal World Cup qualifiers, Albania was drawn against Slovenia, Greece, and Malta. They ended up in second place, winning two matches and losing only one. In the end, Slovenia topped the group and advanced to the two-legged play-offs.

== Competition history ==
=== FIFA Futsal World Cup ===
FIFA Futsal World Cup record										Qualification record							
Year	Round	Pos	Pld	W	D	L	GF	GA	Squad	Year	Pos	Pld	W	D	L	GF	GA
(Chinese Taipei) 2004	Did not qualify									(Chinese Taipei) 2004 (Note: Participated in Group 6 of the European Qualifying Tournament)	3rd	2	0	0	2	10	31
(Brazil) 2008	Did not qualify									(Brazil) 2008 (Note: Participated in Group 7 of the European Qualifying first round)	2nd	3	2	0	1	9	9
(Thailand) 2012	Did not qualify									(Thailand) 2012 (Note: Participated in Group D of the European Preliminary Round)	2nd	3	1	1	1	7	8
(Colombia) 2016	Did not qualify									(Colombia) 2016 (Note: Participated in Group C of the European Preliminary Round)	2nd	3	2	0	1	11	6
(Lithuania) 2020	Did not qualify									(Lithuania) 2020 (Note: Participated in Group C of the European Preliminary Round, finishing 2nd and qualifying for the main round)	(Note: Participated in Group 5 of the European Main Round, finishing 4th)	6	2	1	3	17	16
(Uzbekistan) 2024	Did not qualify									(Uzbekistan) 2024		3	1	0	2	5	9
Total	—	0/6	0	0	0	0	0	0	—	Total	5/5	17	7	2	8	54	70

=== UEFA Futsal Championship ===
UEFA Futsal Championship record										Qualification record							
Year	Round	Pos	Pld	W	D	L	GF	GA	Squad	Year	Pos	Pld	W	D	L	GF	GA
(Czech Republic) 2005	Did not qualify									(Czech Republic) 2005 (Note: Participated in Group B of the preliminary round)	2nd	2	1	1	0	9	7
(Portugal) 2007	Did not qualify									(Portugal) 2007 (Note: Participated in Group A of the preliminary round)	4th	3	0	0	3	8	16
(Hungary) 2010	Did not qualify									(Hungary) 2010 (Note: Participated in Group C of the preliminary round)	3rd	3	1	0	2	5	8
(Croatia) 2012	Did not qualify									(Croatia) 2012 (Note: Participated in Group E of the preliminary round)	2nd	3	2	0	1	11	17
(Belgium) 2014	Did not qualify									(Belgium) 2014 (Note: Participated in Group F of the preliminary round)	4th	3	0	0	3	6	17
(Serbia) 2016	Did not qualify									(Serbia) 2016 (Note: Participated in Group D of the preliminary round)	3rd	3	1	0	2	15	9
(Slovenia) 2018	Did not qualify									(Slovenia) 2018 (Note: Participated in Group D of the preliminary round, finishing 1st and qualifying for the main round)	(Note: Participated in Group 2 of the main round, finishing 4th)	6	3	1	2	24	19
(Netherlands) 2022	Did not qualify									(Netherlands) 2022 (Note: Participated in Group D of the preliminary round, finishing 1st and qualifying for the Qualifying Group Stage finish 4th)		9	3	0	6	35	24
(Latvia) (Lithuania) (Slovenia) 2026	To be determined									(Latvia) (Lithuania) (Slovenia) 2026 (Note: Participated in Group 6 of the main round, finishing 4th)	4th	6	1	0	5	10	23
Total	—	0/9	0	0	0	0	0	0	—	Total	9/9	32	11	2	19	96	119

=== Mediterranean Cup ===
Albania's only participation in a major tournament in futsal came at the 2010 Mediterranean Futsal Cup held in Libya.

In this tournament, the Albanians secured 11th place after a poor start in their group, losing all of their matches. They were able to beat Cyprus 3–4 despite being 3–0 down on the result in the Classification 9th–16th round. After a close loss to rivals Greece (1–2), they beat Algeria in their rematch for 11th place (1–3), securing their second and final win at this tournament. This represents Albania's last participation in a major or regional futsal tournament to date.

Mediterranean Cup Record
Year	Round	Pld	W	D*	L	GS	GA	DIF
Libya 2010	Classification 9th–16th	6	2	0	4	12	22	-10
Total	0/1	6	2	0	4	12	22	-10

*Denotes draws including knockout matches decided on penalty kicks.

== Players ==
=== Current squad ===
The following players were called up to the squad for the 2028 FIFA Futsal World Cup qualifying matches against Cyprus, San Marino and Latvia on 9, 10 and 12 April 2026 respectively.

No.	Pos.	Player	Date of birth (age)	Caps	Goals	Club
1	GK	Fidan Misini	8 September 1993 (age 33)			(Football Federation of Kosovo) FC Liqeni
12	GK	Valdrin Mjeku	7 November 1995 (age 30)			(Football Federation of Kosovo) Mabetex Prishtina
2	DF	Fabiano Tafa	9 April 2004 (age 22)			(Hellenic Football Federation) A.O.T. Alimos Futsal
8	DF	Azem Brahimi (captain)	13 June 1988 (age 38)			(Football Federation of Kosovo) FC Liqeni
10	DF	Arbër Shkodra	30 September 1993 (age 33)			(Football Federation of Kosovo) FC Liqeni
13	DF	Ermir Kryeziu	23 February 1996 (age 30)			(Football Federation of Kosovo) FC Prishtina 01
14	DF	Arif Limani	21 September 1996 (age 30)			(Football Federation of Kosovo) FC Prishtina 01
3	FW	Fatlum Pishtani	17 May 1998 (age 28)			(Football Federation of Kosovo) Drenica Futsal
4	FW	Endrit Kaca	1 February 1990 (age 36)			(Albanian Football Federation) FK Tirana
5	FW	Flamur Tahiri	11 August 1999 (age 27)			(Swedish Football Association) Skoftebyns IF
6	FW	Shqipron Brahimi	30 January 1994 (age 32)			(Football Federation of Kosovo) FC Liqeni
7	FW	Artan Junuzi	13 December 1996 (age 29)			(Football Federation of Macedonia) KMF Forca
9	FW	Qendrim Bakija	11 June 2000 (age 26)			(Royal Belgian Football Association) GS Hoboken Ster
11	FW	Halim Selmanaj	2 October 1992 (age 34)			(Football Federation of Kosovo) FC Prishtina 01

=== Recent call-ups ===
The following players have also been called up to the squad within the last 12 months.

Pos.	Player	Date of birth (age)	Caps	Goals	Club	Latest call-up
GK	Dženis Berjašević	4 July 2001 (age 25)			(Kosovo) FC Prishtina 01	v. Turkey, 18 December 2025
DF	Ermir Doci	20 June 1994 (age 32)			(Albania) FK Tirana	v. Turkey, 18 December 2025
DF	Geraldo Shehu	29 July 1997 (age 29)			(Belgium) ZVC United Wellen	v. Turkey, 18 December 2025
FW	Blend Hyseni	28 October 1999 (age 26)			(Kosovo) Mabetex Prishtina	v. Turkey, 18 December 2025
FW	Egzon Hasani	6 December 1995 (age 30)			(Kosovo) Mabetex Prishtina	v. Turkey, 18 December 2025
^{INJ} Player withdrew from the squad due to an injury.^{PRE} Preliminary squad.^{RET} Retired from international futsal.
