= UEFA Futsal Euro 2018 =

Evropsko prvenstvo v futsalu 2018

Tournament details
- Host country: Slovenia
- City: Ljubljana
- Dates: 30 January – 10 February
- Teams: 12 (from 1 confederation)
- Venue: 1 (in 1 host city)

Final positions
- Champions: Portugal (1st title)
- Runners-up: Spain
- Third place: Russia
- Fourth place: Kazakhstan

Tournament statistics
- Matches played: 20
- Goals scored: 91 (4.55 per match)
- Attendance: 101,934 (5,097 per match)
- Top scorer: (Portugal) Ricardinho (7 goals)
- Best player: (Portugal) Ricardinho

The 2018 UEFA Futsal Championship, commonly referred to as UEFA Futsal Euro 2018, was the 11th edition of the UEFA Futsal Championship, the international futsal championship organised by UEFA for the men's national teams of Europe. It was hosted for the first time in Slovenia, following a decision of the UEFA Executive Committee on 26 January 2015. Slovenia was chosen ahead of other bids from Macedonia and Romania.

The final tournament was contested from 30 January to 10 February and comprised 12 teams, eleven of which joined the hosts Slovenia after overcoming a qualifying tournament. Matches took place at the Arena Stožice in Ljubljana. In their second appearance in the competition's final after 2010, Portugal defeated seven-time winners and defending champions Spain 3–2, after extra-time, to win their first European title.

This was the last tournament to be held on a two-year basis and featuring 12 teams, as the competition will be played every four years, starting from 2022, and include 16 teams.

== Qualification ==
A total of 48 UEFA nations entered the competition (including Germany and Kosovo which entered for the first time), and with the hosts Slovenia qualifying automatically, the other 47 teams competed in the qualifying competition to determine the remaining 11 spots in the final tournament. The qualifying competition, which took place from January to September 2017, consisted of three rounds:

- Preliminary round: The 26 lowest-ranked teams were drawn into seven groups – five groups of four teams and two groups of three teams. Each group was played in single round-robin format at one of the pre-selected hosts. The seven group winners advanced to the main round.
- Main round: The 28 teams (21 highest-ranked teams and seven preliminary round qualifiers) were drawn into seven groups of four teams. Each group was played in single round-robin format at one of the pre-selected hosts. The seven group winners qualified directly to the final tournament, while the seven runners-up and the best third-placed team advanced to the play-offs.
- Play-offs: The eight teams were drawn into four ties to play home-and-away two-legged matches to determine the last four qualified teams.

=== Qualified teams ===
The following 12 teams qualified for the final tournament.

Team	Method of qualification	Appearance	Last appearance	Previous best performance
Slovenia	Hosts	6th	2016	Quarter-finals (2014)
Italy	Main round Group 1 winners	11th	2016	Champions (2003, 2014)
Azerbaijan	Main round Group 2 winners	5th	2016	Fourth place (2010)
Ukraine	Main round Group 3 winners	10th	2016	Runners-up (2001, 2003)
Portugal	Main round Group 4 winners	9th	2016	Runners-up (2010)
Spain	Main round Group 5 winners	11th	2016	Champions (1996, 2001, 2005, 2007, 2010, 2012, 2016)
Kazakhstan	Main round Group 6 winners	2nd	2016	Third place (2016)
Russia	Main round Group 7 winners	11th	2016	Champions (1999)
France	Play-off winners	1st	—	Debut
Poland	Play-off winners	2nd	2001	Group stage (2001)
Romania	Play-off winners	4th	2014	Quarter-finals (2012, 2014)
Serbia	Play-off winners	6th	2016	Fourth place (2016)

=== Final draw ===
The final draw was held on 29 September 2017, 12:00 CEST (UTC+2), at Ljubljana Castle in Ljubljana, Slovenia. The 12 teams were drawn into four groups of three teams. Hosts Slovenia were assigned to position A1 in the draw, and the remaining teams were seeded according to their coefficient ranking, except that title holders Spain were automatically placed into Pot 1.

Each group contained one team from Pot 1, one team from Pot 2, and one team from Pot 3. For political reasons, Russia and Ukraine could not be drawn in the same group or in groups scheduled to be played on the same day (due to a potential clash of teams and clash of fans). Therefore, if Russia were drawn in Group B, Ukraine had to be drawn in Group C or D, and if Russia were drawn in Group C or D, Ukraine had to be drawn in Group A or B.

Hosts + Pot 1
Team	Coeff	Rank
Slovenia (hosts)	6.389	7
Spain (holders)	10.017	2
Russia	10.605	1
Portugal	9.250	3

Pot 2
Team	Coeff	Rank
Italy	8.889	4
Ukraine	7.944	5
Azerbaijan	7.544	6
Kazakhstan	6.333	8

Pot 3
Team	Coeff	Rank
Serbia	5.556	9
Romania	4.278	12
Poland	2.056	19
France	1.278	23

== Venues ==
Location of the 2018 UEFA Futsal Euro final tournament host city

All matches were played at the 12,480-capacity for futsal matches Arena Stožice in Ljubljana.

Ljubljana
Arena Stožice
Capacity: 12,480

== Match officials ==
A total of 16 match officials were appointed for the final tournament.

- Saša Tomić (Croatia)
- Ondřej Černý (Czech Republic)
- Marc Birkett (England)
- Timo Onatsu (Finland)
- Cédric Pelissier (France)
- Balázs Farkas (Hungary)
- Gábor Kovács (Hungary)
- Angelo Galante (Italy)
- Alessandro Malfer (Italy)
- Eduardo Fernandes Coelho (Portugal)
- Bogdan Sorescu (Romania)
- Vladimir Kadykov (Russia)
- Admir Zahovič (Slovenia)
- Juan José Cordero Gallardo (Spain)
- Alejandro Martínez Flores (Spain)
- Kamil Çetin (Turkey)

== Squads ==
Each national team have to submit a squad of 14 players, two of whom must be goalkeepers. If a player is injured or ill severely enough to prevent his participation in the tournament before his team's first match, he can be replaced by another player.

== Group stage ==
The final tournament schedule was confirmed on 16 October 2017.

The group winners and runners-up advance to the quarter-finals.

Tiebreakers

Teams are ranked according to points (3 points for a win, 1 point for a draw, 0 points for a loss), and if tied on points, the following tiebreaking criteria are applied, in the order given, to determine the rankings (Regulations Articles 19.01 and 19.02):

1. Points in head-to-head matches among tied teams;
2. Goal difference in head-to-head matches among tied teams;
3. Goals scored in head-to-head matches among tied teams;
4. If more than two teams are tied, and after applying all head-to-head criteria above, a subset of teams are still tied, all head-to-head criteria above are reapplied exclusively to this subset of teams;
5. Goal difference in all group matches;
6. Goals scored in all group matches;
7. Penalty shoot-out if only two teams have the same number of points, and they met in the last round of the group and are tied after applying all criteria above (not used if more than two teams have the same number of points, or if their rankings are not relevant for qualification for the next stage);
8. Disciplinary points (red card = 3 points, yellow card = 1 point, expulsion for two yellow cards in one match = 3 points);
9. Drawing of lots.

All times are local, CET (UTC+1).

=== Group A ===
Pos	Team	Pld	W	D	L	GF	GA	GD	Pts	Qualification
1	Slovenia (H)	2	1	1	0	4	3	+1	4	Knockout stage
2	Serbia	2	0	2	0	3	3	0	2	Knockout stage
3	Italy	2	0	1	1	2	3	−1	1	

Source: UEFA
Rules for classification: Group stage tiebreakers
(H) Hosts
30 January 2018
18:00

Slovenia	2–2	Serbia
Fetić 3'42"; Vrhovec 14'20"	Report	Ramić 17'03"; Tomić 39'32"

Arena Stožice, Ljubljana
Attendance: 10,212
Referee: Bogdan Sorescu (Romania), Eduardo Fernandes Coelho (Portugal)

1 February 2018
20:45

Serbia	1–1	Italy
Tomić 29'24"	Report	De Luca 31'42"

Arena Stožice, Ljubljana
Attendance: 3,527
Referee: Marc Birkett (England), Kamil Çetin (Turkey)

3 February 2018
20:45

Italy	1–2	Slovenia
Honorio 3'17"	Report	Osredkar 30'27", 38'55"

Arena Stožice, Ljubljana
Attendance: 10,342
Referee: Juan José Cordero Gallardo (Spain), Alejandro Martínez Flores (Spain)

=== Group B ===
Pos	Team	Pld	W	D	L	GF	GA	GD	Pts	Qualification
1	Kazakhstan	2	1	1	0	6	2	+4	4	Knockout stage
2	Russia	2	0	2	0	2	2	0	2	Knockout stage
3	Poland	2	0	1	1	2	6	−4	1	

Source: UEFA
Rules for classification: Group stage tiebreakers
30 January 2018
20:45

Russia	1–1	Poland
Chishkala 35'10"	Report	Kubik 39'51"

Arena Stožice, Ljubljana
Attendance: 3,192
Referee: Timo Onatsu (Finland), Cédric Pelissier (France)

1 February 2018
18:00

Poland	1–5	Kazakhstan
Solecki 27'56"	Report	Taynan 2'54"; Orazov 8'56"; Zhamankulov 19'01"; Pershin 19'32" (2pen.); Douglas Jr. 36'41"

Arena Stožice, Ljubljana
Attendance: 1,930
Referee: Alejandro Martínez Flores (Spain), Juan José Cordero Gallardo (Spain)

3 February 2018
18:00

Kazakhstan	1–1	Russia
Douglas Jr. 23'25"	Report	Eder Lima 1'45"

Arena Stožice, Ljubljana
Attendance: 7,018
Referee: Gábor Kovács (Hungary), Balázs Farkas (Hungary)

=== Group C ===
Pos	Team	Pld	W	D	L	GF	GA	GD	Pts	Qualification
1	Portugal	2	2	0	0	9	4	+5	6	Knockout stage
2	Ukraine	2	1	0	1	6	7	−1	3	Knockout stage
3	Romania	2	0	0	2	3	7	−4	0	

Source: UEFA
Rules for classification: Group stage tiebreakers
31 January 2018
18:00

Portugal	4–1	Romania
Pedro Cary 3'48"; Fábio Cecílio 18'46"; Ricardinho 35'29"; Bruno Coelho 37'00"	Report	Stoica 33'21"

Arena Stožice, Ljubljana
Attendance: 3,093
Referee: Saša Tomić (Croatia), Ondřej Černý (Czech Republic)

2 February 2018
20:45

Romania	2–3	Ukraine
Valadares 4'57"; Ignat 10'33"	Report	Korolyshyn 19'27"; Pediash 27'50"; Shoturma 39'41"

Arena Stožice, Ljubljana
Attendance: 796
Referee: Admir Zahovič (Slovenia), Vladimir Kadykov (Russia)

4 February 2018
18:00

Ukraine	3–5	Portugal
Razuvanov 28'00"; Korolyshyn 31'59"; Shoturma 39'44"	Report	Bruno Coelho 2'18"; Tiago Brito 12'22"; Pedro Cary 33'13"; Nílson Miguel 35'30"; Ricardinho 36'16"

Arena Stožice, Ljubljana
Attendance: 4,411
Referee: Cédric Pelissier (France), Timo Onatsu (Finland)

=== Group D ===
Pos	Team	Pld	W	D	L	GF	GA	GD	Pts	Qualification
1	Spain	2	1	1	0	5	4	+1	4	Knockout stage
2	Azerbaijan	2	1	0	1	5	4	+1	3	Knockout stage
3	France	2	0	1	1	7	9	−2	1	

Source: UEFA
Rules for classification: Group stage tiebreakers
31 January 2018
20:45

Spain	4–4	France
Adolfo 10'37"; Aigoun 19'30" (o.g.); Solano 26'48"; Bebe 37'42"	Report	Mohammed 8'37"; Alla 16'20"; Mouhoudine 20'13"; Ortiz 26'13" (o.g.)

Arena Stožice, Ljubljana
Attendance: 2,060
Referee: Balázs Farkas (Hungary), Gábor Kovács (Hungary)

2 February 2018
18:00

France	3–5	Azerbaijan
N'Gala 6'59"; Mohammed 20'05"; Mouhoudine 39'33"	Report	Bolinha 2'26", 22'02", 23'30"; Everton Cardoso 28'56"; Eduardo 37'09"

Arena Stožice, Ljubljana
Attendance: 912
Referee: Angelo Galante (Italy), Alessandro Malfer (Italy)

4 February 2018
20:45

Azerbaijan	0–1	Spain
	Report	Pola 13'21"

Arena Stožice, Ljubljana
Attendance: 3,076
Referee: Vladimir Kadykov (Russia), Admir Zahovič (Slovenia)

== Knockout stage ==
If a match is drawn after 40 minutes of regular play, an extra time consisting of two five-minute periods is played. If teams are still leveled after extra time, a penalty shoot-out is used to determine the winner. In the third place match, the extra time is skipped and the decision goes directly to kicks from the penalty mark (Regulations Articles 20.02 and 20.03).

=== Bracket ===
Quarter-finals
5 February – Ljubljana
Slovenia	0
Russia	2
6 February – Ljubljana
Portugal	8
Azerbaijan	1
5 February – Ljubljana
Serbia	1
Kazakhstan	3
6 February – Ljubljana
Ukraine	0
Spain	1

Semi-finals
8 February – Ljubljana
Russia	2
Portugal	3
8 February – Ljubljana
Kazakhstan	5 (1)
Spain (p)	5 (3)

Final
10 February – Ljubljana
Portugal (a.e.t.)	3
Spain	2
Third place
10 February – Ljubljana
Russia	1
Kazakhstan	0

=== Quarter-finals ===
5 February 2018
18:00

Serbia	1–3	Kazakhstan
Rajčević 35'24"	Report	Zhamankulov 6'07"; Taynan 22'17"; Douglas Jr. 39'37"

Arena Stožice, Ljubljana
Attendance: 5,246
Referee: Kamil Çetin (Turkey), Marc Birkett (England)

5 February 2018
21:00

Slovenia	0–2	Russia
	Report	Eder Lima 26'12"; Robinho 39'36"

Arena Stožice, Ljubljana
Attendance: 10,369
Referee: Eduardo Fernandes Coelho (Portugal), Bogdan Sorescu (Romania)

6 February 2018
18:00

Portugal	8–1	Azerbaijan
Pedro Cary 2'05", 5'43"; Pany Varela 9'40"; Ricardinho 10'31", 19'32", 25'31", 31'15"; Bruno Coelho 24'09"	Report	Everton Cardoso 0'54"

Arena Stožice, Ljubljana
Attendance: 3,150
Referee: Ondřej Černý (Czech Republic), Saša Tomić (Croatia)

6 February 2018
21:00

Ukraine	0–1	Spain
	Report	Pola 17'02"

Arena Stožice, Ljubljana
Attendance: 2,351
Referee: Alessandro Malfer (Italy), Angelo Galante (Italy)

=== Semi-finals ===
8 February 2018
18:00

Russia	2–3	Portugal
Eder Lima 3'12", 39'11"	Report	André Coelho 30'03", 35'44"; Bruno Coelho 39'04"

Arena Stožice, Ljubljana
Attendance: 6,023
Referee: Gábor Kovács (Hungary), Balázs Farkas (Hungary)

8 February 2018
21:00

Kazakhstan	5–5 (a.e.t.)	Spain
Taynan 7'04"; Higuita 24'14"; Taku 24'59"; Douglas Jr. 38'41"; Zhamankulov 47'33"	Report	Yesenamanov 15'34" (o.g.); Tolrà 18'42"; Joselito 28'08"; Pola 33'01"; Miguelín 42'27"
Penalties
Taynan (penalty missed); Pershin (penalty scored)	1–3	(penalty scored) Miguelín; (penalty scored) Ortiz; (penalty scored) Lin

Arena Stožice, Ljubljana
Attendance: 5,657
Referee: Bogdan Sorescu (Romania), Alessandro Malfer (Italy)

=== Third place match ===
10 February 2018
18:00

Russia	1–0	Kazakhstan
Éder Lima 28'51"	Report

Arena Stožice, Ljubljana
Attendance: 8,217
Referee: Juan José Cordero Gallardo (Spain), Alejandro Martínez Flores (Spain)

=== Final ===
10 February 2018
20:45

Portugal	3–2 (a.e.t.)	Spain
Ricardinho 00'59"; Bruno Coelho 38'18", 49'05" (2pen.)	Report	Tolrà 18'54"; Lin 31'36"

Arena Stožice, Ljubljana
Attendance: 10,352
Referee: Ondřej Černý (Czech Republic), Saša Tomić (Croatia)

2018 UEFA Futsal Euro champions

Portugal
1st title

== Tournament ranking ==
Per statistical convention in football, matches decided in extra time are counted as wins and losses, while matches decided by penalty shoot-out are counted as draws.

Pos	Team	Pld	W	D	L	GF	GA	GD	Pts	Final result
1	Portugal	5	5	0	0	23	9	+14	15	Champions
2	Spain	5	2	2	1	13	12	+1	8	Runners-up
3	Russia	5	2	2	1	7	5	+2	8	Third place
4	Kazakhstan	5	2	2	1	14	9	+5	8	Fourth place
5	Slovenia	3	1	1	1	4	5	–1	4	Eliminated in Quarter-finals
6	Ukraine	3	1	0	2	6	8	–2	3	Eliminated in Quarter-finals
7	Azerbaijan	3	1	0	2	6	12	–6	3	Eliminated in Quarter-finals
8	Serbia	3	0	2	1	4	6	–2	2	Eliminated in Quarter-finals
9	Italy	2	0	1	1	2	3	–1	1	Eliminated in Group stage
10	France	2	0	1	1	7	9	–2	1	Eliminated in Group stage
11	Poland	2	0	1	1	2	6	–4	1	Eliminated in Group stage
12	Romania	2	0	0	2	3	7	–4	0	Eliminated in Group stage

== Statistics ==
=== All-star squad ===
Top five players are bolded.

Pos.	Player
GK	(Russia) **Georgi Zamtaradze**
GK	(Kazakhstan) Leo Higuita
FP	(Kazakhstan) **Taynan da Silva**
FP	(Kazakhstan) **Douglas Júnior**
FP	(Portugal) André Coelho
FP	(Portugal) Pedro Cary
FP	(Portugal) Bruno Coelho
FP	(Portugal) **Ricardinho**
FP	(Russia) Ivan Chishkala
FP	(Serbia) Mladen Kocić
FP	(Slovenia) Igor Osredkar
FP	(Spain) Miguelín
FP	(Spain) **Pola**
FP	(Ukraine) Petro Shoturma

=== Awards ===
Award	Player
Best Player	(Portugal) Ricardinho
Golden Shoe	(Portugal) Ricardinho
Silver Shoe	(Portugal) Bruno Coelho
Bronze Shoe	(Russia) Eder Lima

== Goalscorers ==
7 goals

- (Portugal) Ricardinho

6 goals

- (Portugal) Bruno Coelho

5 goals

- (Russia) Eder Lima

4 goals

- (Kazakhstan) Douglas Jr.
- (Portugal) Pedro Cary

3 goals

- (Azerbaijan) Bolinha
- (Kazakhstan) Taynan da Silva
- (Kazakhstan) Serik Zhamankulov
- (Spain) Pola

2 goals

- (Azerbaijan) Everton Cardoso
- (France) Abdessamad Mohammed
- (France) Souheil Mouhoudine
- (Portugal) André Coelho
- (Serbia) Dragan Tomić
- (Slovenia) Igor Osredkar
- (Spain) Marc Tolrà
- (Ukraine) Taras Korolyshyn
- (Ukraine) Petro Shoturma

1 goal

- (Azerbaijan) Eduardo
- (France) Samir Alla
- (France) Landry N'Gala
- (Italy) Massimo De Luca
- (Italy) Humberto Honorio
- (Kazakhstan) Leo Higuita
- (Kazakhstan) Birzhan Orazov
- (Kazakhstan) Mikhail Pershin
- (Kazakhstan) Pavel Taku
- (Poland) Michał Kubik
- (Poland) Dominik Solecki
- (Portugal) Tiago Brito
- (Portugal) Fábio Cecílio
- (Portugal) Nílson Miguel
- (Portugal) Pany Varela
- (Romania) Florin Ignat
- (Romania) Dumitru Stoica
- (Romania) Sávio Valadares
- (Russia) Ivan Chishkala
- (Russia) Robinho
- (Serbia) Slobodan Rajčević
- (Serbia) Denis Ramić
- (Slovenia) Alen Fetić
- (Slovenia) Gašper Vrhovec
- (Spain) Adolfo
- (Spain) Bebe
- (Spain) Joselito
- (Spain) Lin
- (Spain) Miguelín
- (Spain) Solano
- (Ukraine) Oleksandr Pediash
- (Ukraine) Volodymyr Razuvanov

1 own goal

- (France) Azdine Aigoun (playing against Spain)
- (Kazakhstan) Chingiz Yesenamanov (playing against Spain)
- (Spain) Carlos Ortiz (playing against France)
