= Moldova national futsal team =

Moldova
- Nickname(s): Tricolorii (The Tricolours)
- Association: Moldovan Football Federation (FMF)
- Confederation: UEFA (Europe)
- Head coach: Vasile Arlet
- Captain: Andrian Lașcu
- Home stadium: FMF Futsal Arena
- FIFA code: MDA
- FIFA ranking: 65 ▲1 (24 September 2026)
Home colours	Away colours

First international
- Belgium 14–1 Moldova (Ghent, Belgium; 24 October 1995)

Biggest win
- Moldova 10–0 Malta (Tbilisi, Georgia; 20 October 2011); Moldova 12–2 Gibraltar (Ciorescu, Moldova; 23 October 2015)

Biggest defeat
- Russia 31–0 Moldova (Pepinster, Belgium; 25 October 1995)

AMF World Cup
- Appearances: 1 (First in 1994)
- Best result: 1st round (1994)

The Moldova national futsal team (Romanian: Echipa națională de futsal a Moldovei) is controlled by the Moldovan Football Federation, the governing body for futsal in Moldova and represents the country in international futsal competitions, such as the World Cup and the European Championships.

== Results and fixtures ==
The following is a list of match results in the last 12 months, as well as any future matches that have been scheduled.

Win Draw Loss Fixture

=== 2025 ===
21 December 2025 Friendly	Armenia	2–1	Moldova	Yerevan, Armenia
	Coval , 8' (o.g.); Lașcu , 9' (o.g.)	Report	Obadă 25'	Stadium: FFA Technical Center

22 December 2025 Friendly	Georgia	5–1	Moldova	Yerevan, Armenia
	Gavtadze 3', 16'; Burdujel , 12' (o.g.); Sebiskveradze 18'; Gabrichidze 20'	Report	Lașcu 20'	Stadium: FFA Technical Center

24 December 2025 Friendly	Kyrgyzstan	4–2	Moldova	Yerevan, Armenia
	Makhmadaninov 4', 5'; Abdurashitulu 31'; Dzhanatulu 33'	Report	Obadă 18', 39'	Stadium: FFA Technical Center

=== 2026 ===
9 February 2026 Friendly	Bulgaria	2–2	Moldova	Perushtitsa, Bulgaria
	Benkov 26'; Petev 28'	Report	Moșneagu 9'; Gurgurov 25'	Stadium: Perushtitsa Sports Hall; Referee: Bryan François (France)

10 February 2026 Friendly	France U23	6–5	Moldova	Perushtitsa, Bulgaria
	Canizzaro 2', 16', 22'; Ibrahim 14'; Kolski 40'; Viaud 40'	Report	Obadă 15'; Coval 19'; Gurgurov 19', 20'; Lorenzo , 37' (o.g.)	Stadium: Perushtitsa Sports Hall; Referee: Aleksandar Vangelov (Bulgaria)

11 February 2026 Friendly	Greece	3–4	Moldova	Perushtitsa, Bulgaria
	Ntaris 6'; Kontogeorgis 14'; Tselios 38'	Report	Gurgurov 7', 21'; Obadă 19'; Baciu 33'	Stadium: Perushtitsa Sports Hall

11 March 2026 Friendly	Moldova	2–1	Montenegro	Vrsar, Croatia
	Coval 16'; Moșneagu 39'	Report	Rajković 14'	Stadium: Saline hall Referee: Josip Dujmić (Croatia)

12 March 2026 Friendly	Moldova	1–1	Montenegro	Vrsar, Croatia
	Lașcu 39'	Report	Bojanić 30'	Stadium: Saline hall

15 September 2026 Friendly	Moldova	3–3	Armenia	Ciorescu, Moldova
	Obadă 3'; Coval 31'; Moșneagu 32'	Report	Dermenjyan 30', 32', 38'	Stadium: FMF Futsal Arena; Referee: Victor Bugenko (Moldova)

17 September 2026 Friendly	Moldova	3–4	Armenia	Ciorescu, Moldova
	Lașcu 19'; Crasnov 34'; Coval 39'	Report	Grigoryan 16'; Vasileev 24'; Ghandilyan 29'; Dermenjyan 39'	Stadium: FMF Futsal Arena; Referee: Victor Bugenko (Moldova)

16 October 2026 2028 FIFA World Cup qualifying main round	Montenegro	6–1	Moldova	Podgorica, Montenegro
	Puletić 1'; Marković 7'; Cimbaljević 11'; Vuletić 19'; Nikolić 31', 40'	Report	Coval 39'	Stadium: Verde Complex; Referee: George Jansizian (Sweden)

20 October 2026 2028 FIFA World Cup qualifying main round	Moldova	0–6	France	Ciorescu, Moldova
		Report	Lutin 5'; Guirio 15'; Rezzoug 19'; Diaoune 19'; Tchaptchet 30'; Saadaoui 36'	Stadium: FMF Futsal Arena; Referee: Ugur Cakmak (Turkey)

9 December 2026 2028 FIFA World Cup qualifying main round	France	v	Moldova	Aix-en-Provence, France
		Report		Stadium: Arena du Pays d'Aix

=== 2027 ===
28 February 2027 2028 FIFA World Cup qualifying main round	Moldova	v	Montenegro	Ciorescu, Moldova
		Report		Stadium: FMF Futsal Arena

=== Group 2 ===
Pos	Team	Pld	W	D	L	GF	GA	GD	Pts	Qualification
1	France	1	1	0	0	6	0	+6	3	Elite round
2	Montenegro	1	1	0	0	6	1	+5	3	Elite round or Main round play-offs based on rankings
3	Moldova	2	0	0	2	1	12	−11	0	

Updated to match(es) played on 20 October 2026. Source: UEFA
Rules for classification: Tiebreakers

== Current squad ==
The following players were selected for the 2028 FIFA World Cup qualifying matches against Montenegro and France on 16 and 20 October 2026, respectively.

Note: Flags indicate national team as defined under FIFA eligibility rules; some limited exceptions apply. Players may hold more than one non-FIFA nationality.

No.	Pos.	Nation	Player
1	GK	MDA	Serghei Burduja
2	DF	MDA	Daniel Petrari
3	FW	MDA	Ion Coval
4	FW	MDA	Cristian Crasnov
5	DF	MDA	Sergiu Godorojea
6	FW	MDA	Ion Raducan
7	FW	MDA	Andrian Lașcu (captain)

No.	Pos.	Nation	Player
8	FW	MDA	Vadim Bejenaru
9	FW	MDA	Cristian Obadă
10	FW	MDA	Tudor Botnaru
11	DF	MDA	Vladimir Vasilevschi
12	GK	MDA	Adrian Golubciuc
13	DF	MDA	Alexandru Ghițău
14	FW	MDA	David Moșneagu

Head coach: Vasile Arlet

== Competition history ==
=== FIFA Futsal World Cup ===
- 1989 – did not compete
- 1992 – did not compete
- 1996 – did not qualify
- 2000 – did not compete
- 2004 – did not qualify
- 2008 – did not qualify
- 2012 – did not qualify
- 2016 – did not qualify
- 2021 – did not qualify
- 2024 – did not qualify
- 2028 – TBD

=== UEFA European Futsal Championship ===
- 1996 – did not compete
- 1999 – did not compete
- 2001 – did not compete
- 2003 – did not qualify
- 2005 – did not qualify
- 2007 – did not qualify
- 2010 – did not qualify
- 2012 – did not qualify
- 2014 – did not qualify
- 2016 – did not qualify
- 2018 – did not qualify
- 2022 – did not qualify
- 2026 – did not qualify
