= 2001 UEFA Futsal Championship squads =

This article lists the confirmed national futsal squads for the 2001 UEFA Futsal Championship tournament held in Russia.
