= PalaMaggiò =

Indoor arena in Caserta, Italy

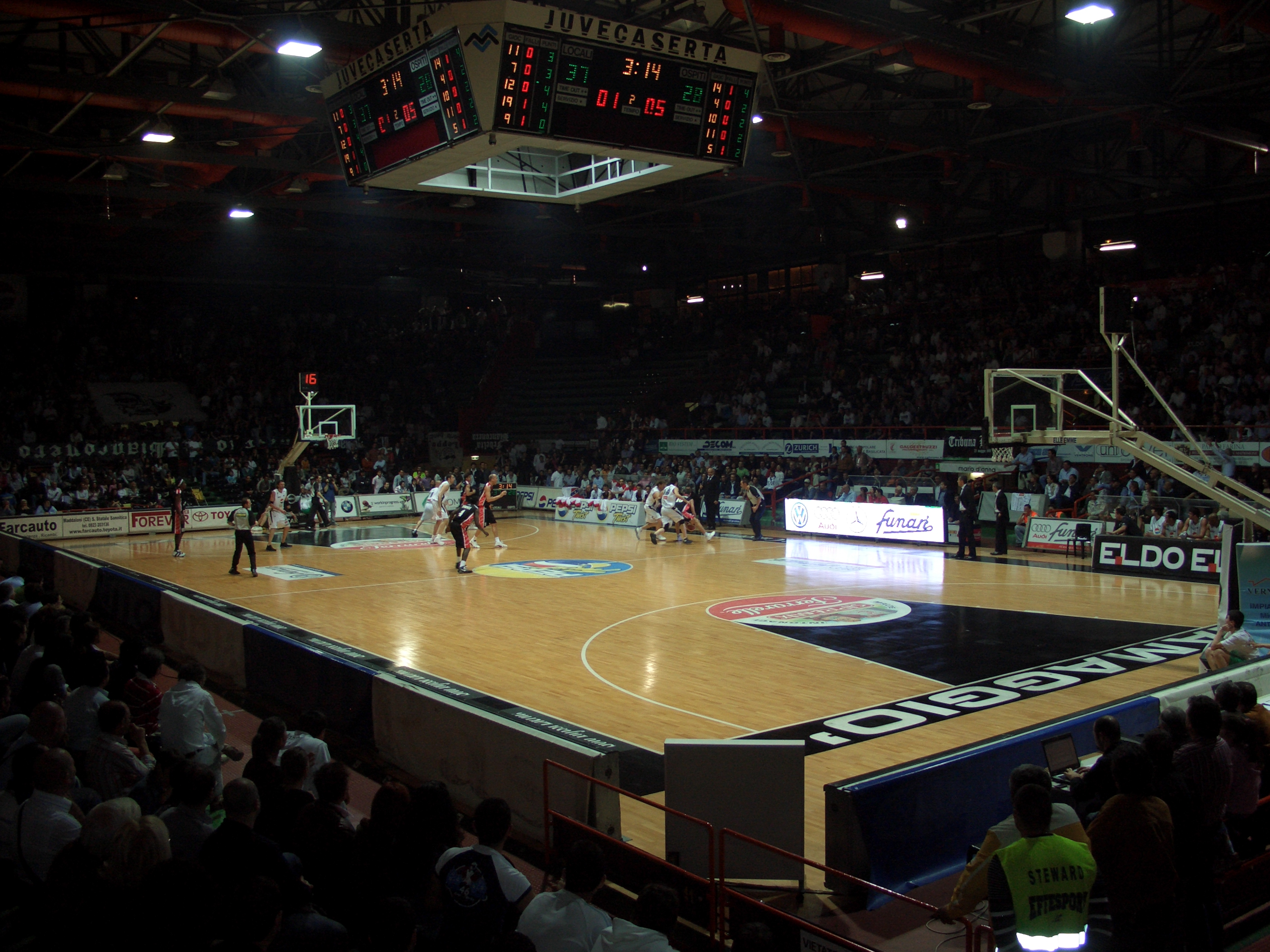
- Interactive map of PalaMaggiò
- Full name: Palazzo dello sport Giovanni Maggiò
- Location: Caserta, Italy
- Coordinates: 41°07′52″N 14°18′39″E
- Capacity: 6,387

Construction
- Built: 1982
- Opened: 1982

Tenant
- Juvecaserta Basket (Serie A)

PalaMaggiò is an indoor sporting arena located in Caserta, Italy. The capacity of the arena is 6,387 spectators and opened in 1982. It hosts indoor sporting events such as basketball, notably the home matched of Juvecaserta Basket of the Lega Basket Serie A.

Preceded by Palais des Sports; Grenoble	FIBA Cup Winners' Cup; Final Venue; 1986	Succeeded by SPENS; Novi Sad
Preceded by Luzhniki; Moscow	UEFA Futsal Championship; Final Venue; 2003	Succeeded by ČEZ Aréna; Ostrava
