= Nílson Miguel =

Portuguese footballer

Personal information
- Full name: Nílson Santos Varela Miguel
- Date of birth: 10 May 1992 (age 34)
- Place of birth: Lisbon, Portugal
- Height: 1.82 m (6 ft 0 in)
- Position: Defender

Team information
- Current team: Benfica
- Number: 9

Youth career
- 2004–2008: Novos Talentos
- 2008–2011: Sporting CP

Senior career*
Years	Team	Apps	(Gls)
2011–2014	Portela		
2014–2020	Braga/AAUM	114	(10)
2020–	Benfica	0	(0)

International career^{‡}
2012	Portugal U21	5	(2)
2016–	Portugal	4	(0)
- * Club domestic league appearances and goals as of 14:45, 10 December 2016 (UTC) ‡ National team caps and goals as of 14:45, 10 December 2016 (UTC)

Nílson Santos Varela Miguel (born 10 May 1992) is a Portuguese professional futsal player who plays as a defender for Benfica and the Portugal national team.

== Personal life ==
Born in Portugal, Miguel is of Angolan descent.
