= Russia national futsal team =

National sports team

Russia
- Nickname(s): Наши парни (Our Boys)
- Association: Russian Football Union
- Confederation: UEFA (Europe)
- Head coach: Beso Zoidze
- Captain: Dmitry Prudnikov
- Top scorer: Konstantin Eremenko (122)
- FIFA code: RUS
- FIFA ranking: 7 (24 September 2026)
- Highest FIFA ranking: 7 (May 2024)
- Lowest FIFA ranking: 8 (November 2024 – April 2025)
Home colours	Away colours

First international
- Soviet Union 6–2 Hungary (Agrigento, Italy, 24 April 1991); Belgium 4–6 Russia (Eindhoven, Netherlands, 18 September 1992)

Biggest win
- Russia 31–2 Moldova (Belgium, 25 October 1995)

Biggest defeat
- Russia 0–7 Brazil (Brasília, Brazil, 4 October 2008)

FIFA World Cup
- Appearances: 7 (First in 1992)
- Best result: (silver) Runners-up (2016)

AMF World Cup
- Appearances: 8 (First in 1991)
- Best result: 4th place (1997, 2000, 2011)

UEFA Futsal Championship
- Appearances: 11 (First in 1996)
- Best result: (gold) Champions (1999)

Grand Prix de Futsal
- Appearances: 3 (First in 2010)
- Best result: (silver) Runners-up (2011, 2013)

The Russian national futsal team (Russian: Сборная России по футзалу, Sbornaya Rossii po futsalu) is the national futsal team of Russia. The team is controlled by the Russian Football Union and affiliats with UEFA. Because of the 2022 Russian invasion of Ukraine, FIFA and Union of European Football Associations (UEFA) suspended all Russian teams from FIFA and UEFA competitions, whether national representative teams or club teams.

Russia has qualified for seven World Cups (1992–2000, 2008–2021) and for every edition of the European Championships. They won the European Championships once, in 1999, with their best World Cup coming in 2016 where they finished runners-up to Argentina.

== History ==
Russia's FIFA Futsal World Cup history began inauspiciously in 1992, when a poor defensive record of 16 goals conceded in three matches meant elimination at the group stage. A turnaround in Spain four years later saw the Russians claim a third spot. Russia's most recent appearance on the world stage came at the 2000 finals in Guatemala, where they took fourth after a 4–2 defeat to Portugal in the third-place play-off. At the UEFA Futsal Championship in late 2007, a new generation finished third.

Russia was drawn in a group of three nations in qualifying for the FIFA Futsal World Cup Brazil 2008, but after France withdrew at the last minute, the berth in the next round was decided in a single eliminator against Serbia. The Russians won 3–2. At the final tournament, Russia was drawn in Group A. Russia finished second and qualified for the second round. This time Russia was drawn in Group F. After losing to Spain in the opening match, Russia went on to scrape through to set up a semi-final against Brazil. However, Russia was unable to past Brazil and eventually placed fourth after losing out to Italy in the Third place playoff final.

Because of the 2022 Russian invasion of Ukraine, the FIFA and Union of European Football Associations (UEFA) suspended from FIFA and UEFA competitions all Russian teams, whether national representative teams or club teams.

== Results and fixtures ==
Legend

Win Draw Loss Void or Postponed Fixture

=== 2021 ===
12 September 2021 FIFA Futsal World Cup GS Group B	RFU	9–0	Egypt	Vilnius, Lithuania
16:00 EEST (UTC+3)	Kudziev 6'; Chishkala 13', 16', 30'; Antoshkin 28'; El-Ashwal 28' (o.g.); Abramov 31' (pen.), 32'; Milovanov 36'	Report (FIFA)		Stadium: Avia Solutions Group Arena; Referee: Gean Telles (Brazil)

15 September 2021 FIFA Futsal World Cup GS Group B	Uzbekistan	2–4	RFU	Vilnius, Lithuania
20:00 EEST (UTC+3)	Choriev 21'; Adilov 28'	Report (FIFA)	Robinho 10'; Niiazov 11', 35', 35'	Stadium: Avia Solutions Group Arena; Referee: Cristian Espindola (Chile)

18 September 2021 FIFA Futsal World Cup GS Group B	Guatemala	1–4	RFU	Kaunas, Lithuania
18:00 EEST (UTC+3)	Alvarado 25' (pen.)	Report (FIFA)	Afanasev 2'; Asadov 10'; Abramov 14'; Antoshkin 27'	Stadium: Žalgiris Arena; Referee: Henry Gutiérrez (Bolivia)

22 September 2021 FIFA Futsal World Cup R16	RFU	3–2	Vietnam	Vilnius, Lithuania
17:30	Robinho 11'; Chishkala 18', 30'		Nguyễn Đắc Huy 18'; Phạm Đức Hòa 39'	Stadium: Avia Solutions Group Arena; Referee: Roberto López (Panama)

26 September 2021 FIFA Futsal World Cup QF	RFU	1–1 (a.e.t.) (4–5 p)	Argentina	Žalgiris Arena, Kaunas
18:30	Antoshkin 35'	Report	Cuzzolino 25'	Attendance: 1,108; Referee: Anthony Riley (New Zealand)
	Penalties
	Abramov (penalty missed); Robinho (penalty scored); Lima (penalty scored); Antoshkin (penalty scored); Chishkala (penalty missed); Asadov (penalty scored); Rômulo (penalty missed)		(penalty scored) Bolo; (penalty scored) Basile; (penalty scored) Edelstein; (penalty missed) Stazzone; (penalty missed) Cuzzolino; (penalty scored) Claudino; (penalty scored) Taborda

=== 2022 ===
21 January 2022 Euro 2022	Russia	7–1	Slovakia	Ziggo Dome, Amsterdam
17:30	Antoshkin 9'58", 22'54", 29'35"; Sokolov 10'21", 34'30"; Robinho 28'16"; Milovanov 36'33"	Report	Kozár 2'17"	Attendance: 0 Referee: Grigori Ošomkov (Estonia), Viktor Bugenko (Moldova)

25 January 2022 Euro 2022	Croatia	0–4	Russia	Ziggo Dome, Amsterdam
17:30		Report	Antoshkin 2'33", 25'55"; Paulinho 11'11"; Chishkala 19'15"	Attendance: 0 Referee: Victor Chaix (France), Cédric Pelissier (France)

29 January 2022 Euro 2022	Russia	5–1	Poland	Ziggo Dome, Amsterdam
14:30	Sokolov 5'42"; Davydov 15'31"; Chishkala 21'11", 28'20"; Milovanov 36'44"	Report	Leszczak 19'24" (pen.)	Attendance: 1250; Referee: David Urdánoz Apezteguía (Spain), Kamil Çetin (Turkey)

1 February 2022 Euro 2022	Russia	3–1	Georgia	Ziggo Dome, Amsterdam
19:00	Niyazov 22'08"; Chishkala 27'32", 39'54"	Report	Petry Branco 23'40"	Referee: Ondřej Černý (Czech Republic), Jan Kresta (Czech Republic)

4 February 2022 Euro 2022	Ukraine	2–3	Russia	Ziggo Dome, Amsterdam
17:00	Siryi 15'25"; Abakshyn 34'31"	Report	Sokolov 1'16"; Afanasyev 14'31"; Niyazov 30'01"	Referee: Ondřej Černý (Czech Republic), Jan Kresta (Czech Republic)

6 February 2022 Euro 2022	Portugal	4–2	Russia	Ziggo Dome, Amsterdam
17:30	Tomás Paçó 18'39"; André Coelho 26'45", 31'16"; Pany Varela 39'59"	Report	Sokolov 9'49"; Afanasyev 12'45"	Stadium: Ziggo Dome, Amsterdam; Referee: Juan José Cordero Gallardo (Spain), Alejandro Martinez Flores (Spain)

7 November 2022 Friendly	Tajikistan	10–7	Russia	Dushanbe, Tajikistan
18:00 (UTC+3:00)	Yorov 11'9" (39'27"); Soliyev 12'43" (30'17"); Salomov 17'35" (39'34"); Sardorov 24'52 (penalty), 27'35", 28'1", 32'36"		Asadov 2'9", 18'7", 29', 38', 39'15"; Denisov 6'14"; Niyazov 25'21"	Stadium: Poytaht Tennis and Water Sports Hall

8 November 2022 Friendly	Tajikistan	2–6	Russia	Dushanbe, Tajikistan
18:00 (UTC+3:00)	Yorov 3'15"; Rizomov 31'3"		Niyazov 7'18" (38'26"); Zabolonkov 9'53"; Ponkratov 13'50" (21'49"); Denisov 19'18"	Stadium: Poytaht Tennis and Water Sports Hall

=== 2023 ===
6 March 2023 Friendly	Kyrgyzstan	1–6	Russia	Bishkek, Kyrgyzstan
18:00 (UTC+3:00)	Abdujalil uulu Aydarbek 24'58"		Karpov 6'49"; Pirogov 15'4", 16'3"; Dyomin 25'50"; Batyrev 31'32"; Muzhdakov 39'48"	Stadium: Gazprom Sports Complex

7 March 2023 Friendly	Kyrgyzstan	0–9	Russia	Bishkek, Kyrgyzstan
18:00 (UTC+3:00)			Abramov 1'3", 1'31"; Antoshkin 6'21"; Pirogov 10'27"; Obzhorin 11'32", 37'37"; Batyrev 32'2"; Alibekov 33'32", 34'19"	Stadium: Gazprom Sports Complex

13 April 2023 Friendly	Serbia	0–0	Russia	Vršac, Serbia
20:30 (UTC+3:00)				Stadium: Millennium Centar

13 April 2023 Friendly	Serbia	2–1	Russia	Vršac, Serbia
20:30 (UTC+3:00)	Aleksić 6'; Petrov 11'		Denisov 34'	Stadium: Millennium Centar

19 September 2023 Friendly	Vietnam	3–3	Russia	Ho Chi Minh City, Vietnam
17:00 (UTC+7:00)	Pirogov 28'9" (own goal); Châu Đoàn Phát 29'19"; Phạm Đức Hòa 39'47"		Pirogov 14'; Fakhrutdinov 16'19"; Asadov 28'48"	Stadium: Lãnh Binh Thăng Arena

18 December 2023 Friendly	Iran	3–2	Russia	Lar, Iran
18:30 (UTC+3:00)	Karimi 26'24", 27'20"; Hassanzadeh 34'11"		Niyazov 36'33"; Orlov 37'29"	Stadium: Tubi Sports Complex

19 December 2023 Friendly	Iran	2–6	Russia	Lar, Iran
12:40 (UTC+3:00)	Abbasi 1'2"; Derakhshani 22'38"		Kudziyev 5'10", 27'40", 29'55", 34'14"; Fakhrutdinov 9'8"; Karpov 12'24"	Stadium: Tubi Sports Complex

=== 2024 ===
1 February 2024 Friendly	Russia	4–2	Uzbekistan	Nizhny Novgorod, Russia
(UTC+03:00)				Stadium: Meshchersky

3 February 2024 Friendly	Russia	5–1	Uzbekistan	Nizhny Novgorod, Russia
15:00 (UTC+03:00)				Stadium: Meshchersky

13 April 2024 Friendly	Russia	5–5	Serbia	Saint Petersburg, Russia
17:00 (UTC+03:00)				Stadium: Nova Arena

15 April 2024 Friendly	Russia	5–0	Serbia	Saint Petersburg, Russia
16:00 (UTC+03:00)				Stadium: Nova Arena

23 September 2024 Friendly	Chile	3–0	Russia	Santiago, Chile
20:00 (UTC−03:00)				Stadium: Centro de Deportes Colectivos

24 September 2024 Friendly	Chile	3–3	Russia	Santiago, Chile
20:00 (UTC−03:00)				Stadium: Centro de Deportes Colectivos

14 December 2024 Friendly	Kyrgyzstan	1–3	Russia	Bishkek, Kyrgyzstan
18:30 (UTC+06:00)

15 December 2024 Friendly	Kyrgyzstan	2–6	Russia	Bishkek, Kyrgyzstan
18:30 (UTC+06:00)

=== 2025 ===
16 October 2026 Friendly	Russia	1–1	Iran	Tula, Russia
				Stadium: Tulitsa Arena

18 October 2026 Friendly	Russia	5–2	Iran	Tula, Russia
				Stadium: Tulitsa Arena

19 December 2026 Friendly	Uzbekistan	3–2	Russia	Bukhara, Uzbekistan
				Stadium: Universal Sports Complex

21 December 2026 Friendly	Uzbekistan	1–3	Russia	Bukhara, Uzbekistan
				Stadium: Universal Sports Complex

=== 2026 ===
11 April 2026 Friendly	Kyrgyzstan	0–6	Russia	Bishkek, Kyrgyzstan
17:30 (UTC+06:00)

13 April 2026 Friendly	Kyrgyzstan	2–4	Russia	Bishkek, Kyrgyzstan
16:30 (UTC+06:00)

1 August Continental Futsal Championship	Russia	2–2	Vietnam	Nonthaburi, Thailand
18:00 UTC+7	Pavlov 10'; Pirogov 27'		Nguyễn Thịnh Phát 24'; Trần Thái Huy 25'	Stadium: Nonthaburi Sports Complex Gymnasium

3 August Continental Futsal Championship	Russia	5–0	New Zealand	Nonthaburi, Thailand
18:00 UTC+7				Stadium: Nonthaburi Sports Complex Gymnasium

5 August Continental Futsal Championship	Russia	3–3	Afghanistan	Nonthaburi, Thailand
18:00 UTC+7				Stadium: Nonthaburi Sports Complex Gymnasium

6 August Continental Futsal Championship	Thailand	1–7	Russia	Nonthaburi, Thailand
20:30 UTC+7	Panat 17'		Moskalev 2', 15'; Ponkratov 19', 28'; Antoshkin 22'; Valeev 39'; Pirogov 40'	Stadium: Nonthaburi Sports Complex Gymnasium

19 October Friendly	Tajikistan	2–11	Russia	Dushanbe, Tajikistan
17:00 UTC+3

20 October Friendly	Tajikistan	2–7	Russia	Dushanbe, Tajikistan
17:00 UTC+3

8 November Friendly	Russia	8–0	Vietnam	Nizhny Novgorod, Russia
--:-- UTC+6	Moskalev 2', 20'; Musin-Pushkin 2'; Ponkratov 8'; Sokolov 13'; Shukletsov 29'; Pirogov 34'; Smirnov 38'			Stadium: Meshchersky

10 November Friendly	Russia	3–3	Vietnam	Nizhny Novgorod, Russia
--:-- UTC+6	Pirogov 8'; Karpov 12'; Muzhdakov 39'		Từ Minh Quang 12'; Trần Thái Huy 22'; Nguyễn Thịnh Phát 29'	Stadium: Meshchersky

== Coaching staff ==
Source:Ассоциация мини-футбола России

Position	Name
Head coach	(Georgia (country)) (Russia) Beso Zoidze
Assistant coach	(Russia) Konstantin Mayevsky
Assistant coach	(Russia) Gennady Garagulya
Honorary President of the RAoMF; General Manager	(Russia) Semen Andreyev
President of the RAoMF; Head of the Delegation	(Russia) Emil Aliyev

== Players ==
=== Current squad ===
The following players were called up to the squad for the UEFA Futsal Euro 2022.

No.	Pos.	Player	Date of birth (age)	Club
1	GK	Georgi Zamtaradze	12 February 1987 (aged 34)	(Russian Football Union) MFK KPRF
16	GK	Dmitri Putilov	5 December 1994 (aged 27)	(Russian Football Union) MFK Sinara Yekaterinburg
4	DF	Artem Antoshkin	17 December 1993 (aged 28)	(Russian Football Union) MFK Tyumen
7	DF	Shaykdinov	8 February 1989 (aged 32)	(Russian Football Union) MFK Tyumen
12	DF	Ivan Chishkala	11 July 1995 (aged 26)	(Portuguese Football Federation) Benfica
20	DF	Nando	31 October 1987 (aged 34)	(Russian Football Union) MFK Dinamo Samara
8	FW	Éder Lima (until 25 January)	29 June 1984 (aged 37)	(Brazilian Football Confederation) Corinthians
9	FW	Sergei Abramov (captain)	9 September 1990 (aged 31)	(Russian Football Union) MFK Sinara Yekaterinburg
10	FW	Robinho	28 January 1983 (aged 38)	(Portuguese Football Federation) Benfica
11	FW	Artem Niyazov	30 July 1996 (aged 25)	(Russian Football Union) MFK KPRF
13	FW	Sergei Abramovich	15 January 1990 (aged 32)	(Russian Football Union) MFK Tyumen
14	FW	Daniil Davydov	23 January 1989 (aged 32)	(Russian Football Union) MFK Gazprom-Ugra Yugorsk
17	FW	Anton Sokolov	28 February 1999 (aged 22)	(Russian Football Union) MFK Sinara Yekaterinburg
18	FW	Andrei Afanasyev (from 25 January)	23 May 1986 (aged 35)	(Russian Football Union) MFK Gazprom-Ugra Yugorsk
19	FW	Paulinho	19 October 1985 (aged 36)	(Russian Football Union) MFK KPRF

=== Notable players ===
- Konstantin Eremenko (1992–2001)
- Sergey Zuev (2002–2012)
- Vladislav Shayakhmetov (2004–2016)
- Pula (2007–2014)
- Cirilo (2007–2014)
- Eder Lima (2010–)
- Sergei Abramov (2010–)
- Robinho (2009–)

== Competitive record ==
=== FIFA Futsal World Cup ===
FIFA Futsal World Cup record
Year	Round	Position	GP	W	D	L	GS	GA
as Part of Soviet Union
(Netherlands) 1989	did not invited to participate to the tournament							
as Russia
(Hong Kong) 1992	Group stage	9th	3	1	1	1	20	16
(Spain) 1996	Third place	3rd	8	4	2	2	29	17
(Guatemala) 2000	Fourth place	4th	8	4	0	4	37	24
(Taiwan) 2004	Did not qualify							
(Brazil) 2008	Fourth place	4th	9	4	1	4	62	31
(Thailand) 2012	Quarter-finals	5th	5	4	0	1	32	3
(Colombia) 2016	Runners-up	2nd	7	6	0	1	40	16
(Lithuania) 2021	Quarter-finals	5th	5	4	1	0	21	6
(Uzbekistan) 2024	Suspended due to the invasion of Ukraine							
(To be determined) 2028	Suspended due to the invasion of Ukraine							
Total:7/11	Runners-up	2nd	40	23	4	13	241	114

=== UEFA Futsal Championship ===
UEFA Futsal Championship record
Year	Round	Position	GP	W	D	L	GS	GA
(Spain) 1996	Runners-up	2nd	4	3	0	1	17	10
(Spain) 1999	Champions	1st	5	4	1	0	23	14
(Russia) 2001	Third place	3rd	5	3	0	2	14	9
(Italy) 2003	Round 1	6th	3	1	0	2	5	6
(Czech Republic) 2005	Runners-up	2nd	5	3	0	2	15	10
(Portugal) 2007	Third place	3rd	5	3	0	2	13	12
(Hungary) 2010	Quarter-finals	5th	3	1	1	1	8	5
(Croatia) 2012	Runners-up	2nd	5	3	1	1	14	8
(Belgium) 2014	Runners-up	2nd	5	3	1	1	22	11
(Serbia) 2016	Runners-up	2nd	5	3	1	1	16	15
(Slovenia) 2018	Third place	3rd	5	2	2	1	7	5
(Netherlands) 2022	Runners-up	2nd	6	5	0	1	24	9
(Latvia) (Lithuania) (Slovenia) 2026	Suspended due to the invasion of Ukraine							
Total:12/13	1 Title	1st	56	34	7	15	178	114

=== Grand Prix de Futsal ===
Grand Prix de Futsal record
Year	Round	Position	GP	W	D	L	GS	GA
(Brazil) 2005	did not enter							
(Brazil) 2006	did not enter							
(Brazil) 2007	did not enter							
(Brazil) 2008	did not enter							
(Brazil) 2009	did not enter							
(Brazil) 2010	9th place	9th	6	4	1	1	28	10
(Brazil) 2011	Runners-up	2nd	6	5	0	1	29	11
(Brazil) 2013	Runners-up	2nd	5	4	1	0	22	8
(Brazil) 2014	did not enter							
(Brazil) 2015	did not enter							
(Brazil) 2018	did not enter							
Total	3/11		17	13	2	2	79	29

=== Futsal Mundialito ===
Futsal Mundialito record
Year	Round	Position	Pld	W	D	L	GS	GA
(Italy) 1994	did not enter							
(Brazil) 1995	did not enter							
(Brazil) 1996	did not enter							
(Brazil) 1998	did not enter							
(Brazil) 2001	did not enter							
(Italy) 2002	Third place	3rd	4	1	0	3	17	15
(Portugal) 2006	did not enter							
(Portugal) 2007	did not enter							
(Portugal) 2008	did not enter							
Total	1/9		4	1	0	3	17	15

=== Other tournaments ===
Thailand Five's

- 2003 – (bronze) Third place

Continental Futsal Championship

- 2026 – (gold) Winners

== Head-to-head record ==
Team	Pld	Win	Drawn*	Lose	GF	GA	Diff
Afghanistan	1	0	1	0	3	3	+0
Argentina	9	3	4	2	26	24	+2
Australia	1	1	0	0	10	1	+9
Azerbaijan	6	4	1	1	23	13	+10
Belarus	13	10	2	1	57	16	+41
Belgium	13	10	3	0	59	25	+34
Bosnia and Herzegovina	3	2	0	1	8	6	+2
Brazil	17	1	1	15	31	81	−50
Chile	2	0	1	1	3	6	−3
China	4	3	1	0	26	6	+20
Colombia	1	1	0	0	2	0	+2
Costa Rica	2	2	0	0	11	3	+8
Croatia	9	6	3	0	27	14	+13
Cuba	2	2	0	0	17	6	+11
Czech Republic	14	10	1	3	45	30	+15
Egypt	4	2	1	1	21	9	+12
Finland	3	3	0	0	12	1	+11
France	3	3	0	0	13	1	+12
Georgia	2	2	0	0	17	5	+12
Greece	4	4	0	0	47	3	+44
Guatemala	4	3	1	0	23	3	+20
Hungary	11	10	1	0	64	25	+39
Iran	31	13	10	8	88	82	+6
Israel	1	1	0	0	6	1	+5
Italy	20	7	5	8	46	46	+0
Japan	4	3	0	1	23	12	+11
Kazakhstan	6	4	2	0	16	6	+10
Kyrgyzstan	4	4	0	0	19	5	+14
Latvia	7	7	0	0	31	1	+30
Libya	1	1	0	0	2	0	+2
Lithuania	1	1	0	0	4	1	+3
North Macedonia	2	2	0	0	16	4	+12
Moldova	1	1	0	0	31	0	+31
Montenegro	1	1	0	0	7	1	+6
Netherlands	18	15	1	2	63	29	+34
New Zealand	2	2	0	0	12	3	+9
Paraguay	3	3	0	0	15	6	+9
Poland	12	9	2	1	59	23	+36
Portugal	14	4	4	6	37	41	−4
Qatar	1	1	0	0	9	2	+7
Romania	2	2	0	0	8	1	+7
Serbia	12	10	1	1	35	20	+15
Slovakia	6	5	0	1	29	12	+17
Slovenia	10	9	1	0	37	12	+25
Solomon Islands	2	2	0	0	47	2	+45
Spain	23	2	4	17	52	85	−33
Thailand	5	5	0	0	24	10	+14
Tajikistan	2	2	0	0	18	4	+14
Turkey	3	3	0	0	16	1	+15
Ukraine	13	11	0	2	49	25	+24
United States	1	0	0	1	3	8	−5
Uruguay	1	0	0	1	0	2	−2
Uzbekistan	2	2	0	0	9	3	+6
Vietnam	7	4	3	0	32	12	+20
Zambia	1	1	0	0	13	1	+12
Total	327	208	50	70	1317	690	+627
