= Daniil Davydov =

Russian futsal player

Personal information
- Date of birth: 23 January 1989 (age 37)
- Height: 1.76 m (5 ft 9 in)
- Position: Forward

Team information
- Current team: Gazprom-Ugra
- Number: 18

Senior career*
| Years | Team | Apps | (Gls) |
| 2008– | Gazprom-Ugra | | |

International career^{‡}
| 2010– | Russia | | |
- * Club domestic league appearances and goals as of 7 February 2016 ‡ National team caps and goals as of 7 February 2016

Daniil Davydov (born 23 January 1989) is a Russian male futsal player, playing as a forward. He is part of the Russia national futsal team. He competed at the UEFA Futsal Euro 2016. At club level he is playing for Gazprom-Ugra in Russia in 2016.
