= 2004 FIFA Futsal World Championship qualification =

The qualification competition for the 2004 FIFA Futsal World Championship was a series of tournaments organised by the six FIFA confederations. Each confederation — the AFC (Asia), CAF (Africa), CONCACAF (North, Central America and Caribbean), CONMEBOL (South America), OFC (Oceania), and UEFA (Europe) — was allocated a certain number of the 16 places at the tournament.

== Qualification process ==
| Confederation | Teams started | Teams eliminated | Teams qualified | Qualifying end date |
|---|---|---|---|---|
| Africa (CAF) | 8 | 7 | 1 | 3 September 2004 |
| Asia (AFC) | 18+1 | 15 | 3+1 | 25 April 2004 |
| Europe (UEFA) | 32 | 27 | 5 | 17 December 2003 |
| North, Central America and Caribbean (CONCACAF) | 16 | 14 | 2 | 1 August 2004 |
| Oceania (OFC) | 6 | 5 | 1 | 29 July 2004 |
| South America (CONMEBOL) | 10 | 7 | 3 | 1 September 2003 |
| Total | 90+1 | 75 | 15+1 | 3 September 2004 |

== Africa (CAF) ==
=== Final ===
| Team 1 | Agg. | Team 2 | 1st leg | 2nd leg |
|---|---|---|---|---|
| Egypt | 13–7 | Mozambique | 10–2 | 3–5 |

== Asia (AFC) ==
=== Knockout stage ===
| Team 1 | Score | Team 2 |
|---|---|---|
Final
| Japan | 3–5 | Iran |
Third place match
| Uzbekistan | 1–3 | Thailand |

== Europe (UEFA) ==
=== Play-offs ===
| Team 1 | Agg. | Team 2 | 1st leg | 2nd leg |
|---|---|---|---|---|
| Bosnia and Herzegovina | 9–11 | Czech Republic | 5–7 | 4–4 |
| Poland | 4–14 | Portugal | 2–7 | 2–7 |
| Slovenia | 2–8 | Spain | 1–4 | 1–4 |
| Belarus | 2–7 | Ukraine | 0–4 | 2–3 |
| Hungary | 0–11 | Italy | 0–4 | 0–7 |

== North, Central America and Caribbean (CONCACAF) ==
=== Semi-final ===
| Team 1 | Score | Team 2 |
|---|---|---|
| Cuba | 5–4 | Mexico |
| Costa Rica | 0–4 | United States |

== Oceania (OFC) ==
=== Final positions ===
| Team | Pld | Pts |
|---|---|---|
| Australia | 5 | 15 |
| New Zealand | 5 | 12 |
| Vanuatu | 5 | 9 |
| Fiji | 5 | 6 |
| Solomon Islands | 5 | 3 |
| Samoa | 5 | 0 |

== South America (CONMEBOL) ==
=== Final Round ===
| Team | Pld | Pts |
|---|---|---|
| Argentina | 3 | 7 |
| Brazil | 3 | 6 |
| Paraguay | 3 | 4 |
| Uruguay | 3 | 0 |
