= Robinho (futsal player) =

Russian futsal player

Personal information
- Full name: Edelson Robson dos Santos
- Date of birth: 28 January 1983 (age 43)
- Place of birth: Brazil
- Height: 1.65 m (5 ft 5 in)
- Position: Winger

Senior career*
Years	Team	Apps	(Gls)
2004–2006	Action 21 Charleroi		
2006–2016	Gazprom-Ugra		
2016–2017	Dinamo Moskva		
2017–2022	Benfica	63	(35)
2022–2024	Braga		
2024–	Joinville Futsal		

International career^{‡}
2009–	Russia	72	(30)
- * Club domestic league appearances and goals ‡ National team caps and goals as of 22 January 2022

Edelson Robson dos Santos (born 28 January 1983), known as Robinho, is a Russian professional futsal player who plays as a winger for the Russia national team.

== Honours ==
Action 21 Charleroi

- Belgian Futsal Division 1: 2003–04
- UEFA Futsal Cup: 2004–05

Gazprom-Ugra Yugorsk

- Russian Futsal Super League: 2014–15
- Russian Cup: 2015–16
- UEFA Futsal Cup: 2015–16

Benfica

- Campeonato Nacional: 2018–19
- Taça da Liga: 2017–18, 2018–19, 2019–20

International

- FIFA Futsal World Cup: Runner-up 2016
- UEFA Futsal Championship: Runner-up 2014, 2016; Third-place 2018
