= Éder Lima (futsal player) =

Futsal player

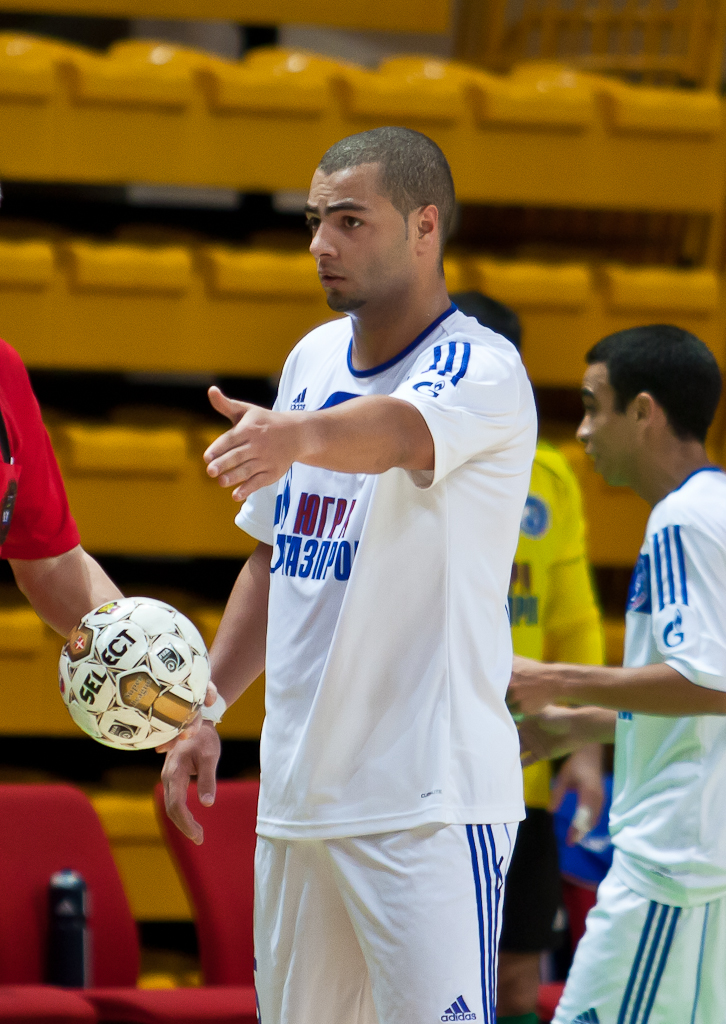

Personal information
- Full name: Éder Fermino Lima
- Date of birth: 29 June 1984 (age 42)
- Place of birth: São Paulo, Brazil
- Height: 1.84 m (6 ft 1/2 in)
- Position: Pivot

Senior career*
Years	Team	Apps	(Gls)
- Banespa
2004–2005	Estrela Amadora		
2006–2017	Gazprom-Ugra		
2017–2019	Magnus	53	(23)
2020–2021	Corinthians	23	(3)
2022	ACBF	17	(7)
2023	JEC Krona		

International career
2009–2022	Russia	25	(30)
- * Club domestic league appearances and goals

Éder Fermino Lima (born 29 June 1984), commonly known as Éder Lima, is a futsal player who plays as a pivot. Born in Brazil, he represents the Russia national team.

== Awards ==
- 2012 FIFA Futsal World Cup:
  - Golden Shoe winner (9 goals)
- UEFA Futsal Euro 2014:
  - Golden Shoe winner (8 goals)
- 2016 FIFA Futsal World Cup:
  - Silver Shoe winner
  - Silver Ball winner
- UEFA Futsal Euro 2018:
  - Third Place
