= Douglas Júnior =

Brazilian-born Kazakhstani futsal player

Personal information
- Full name: Douglas Júnior da Silva Negreiros
- Date of birth: 15 October 1988 (age 38)
- Place of birth: Guamaré, Brazil
- Height: 1.80 m (5 ft 11 in)
- Position: Forward

Team information
- Current team: MFK KPRF
- Number: 16

Senior career*
Years	Team	Apps	(Gls)
2009	ABC		
2010–2014	ERA-PACK Chrudim		
2014–	AFC Kairat	79	(63)
2022–	→ MFK KPRF (loan)		

International career^{‡}
2015–	Kazakhstan	30	(27)
- * Club domestic league appearances and goals as of 7 February 2016 ‡ National team caps and goals as of 7 February 2016

Douglas Júnior da Silva Negreiros (born 15 October 1988), simply known as Douglas Júnior, is a professional futsal player who plays as a forward for MFK KPRF. Born in Brazil, he plays for the Kazakhstan national team.

== Honours ==
- UEFA Futsal Champions League runner-up: 2018–19
