= Pola (futsal player) =

Spanish futsal player

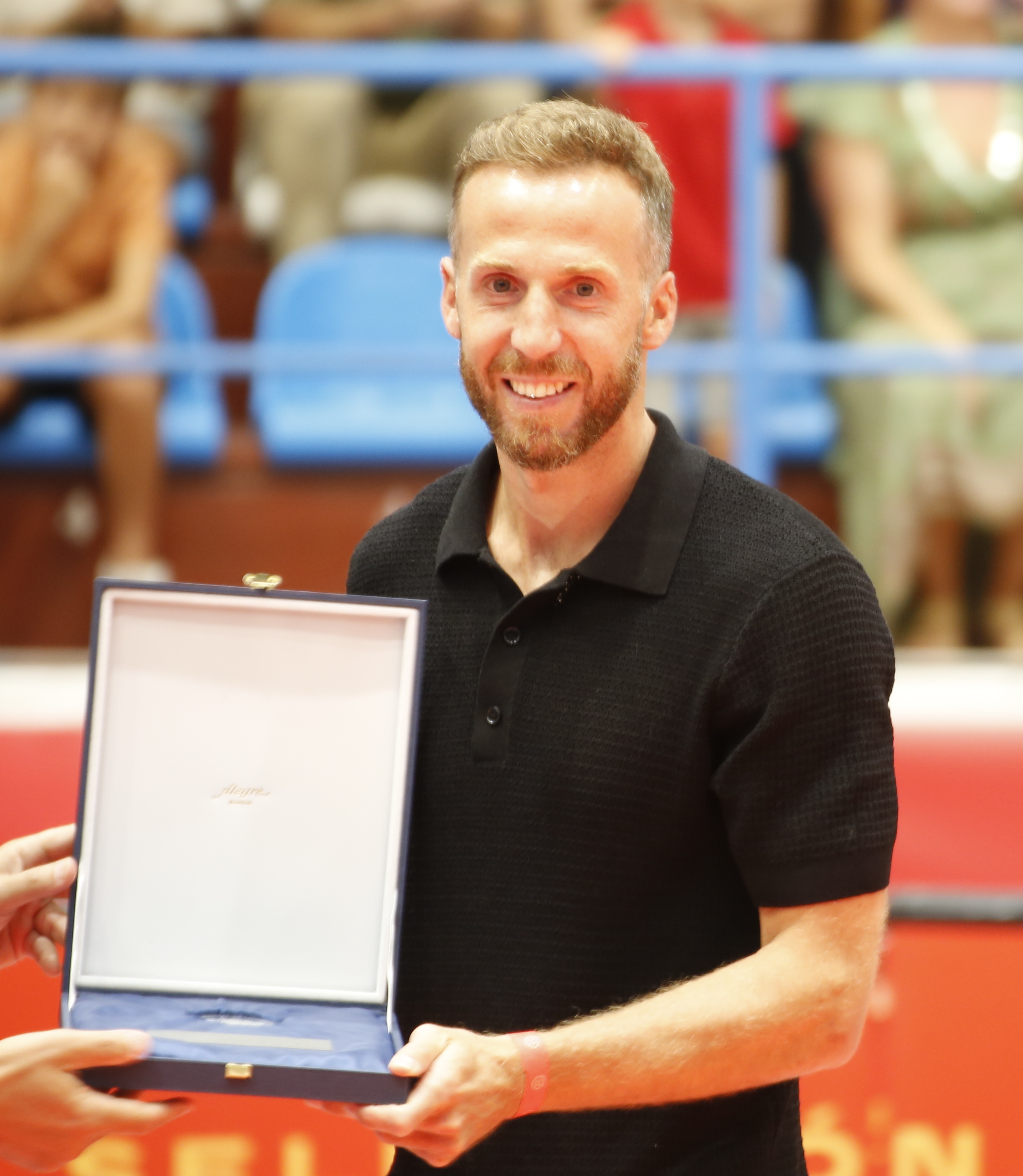

Personal information
- Full name: Adrián Alonso Pereira
- Date of birth: 26 June 1988 (age 38)
- Place of birth: Vigo, Spain
- Positions: Ala; Cierre

Team information
- Current team: Inter Movistar

Youth career
- Redondela
- 2005–06: Lobelle

Senior career*
Years	Team	Apps	(Gls)
2004–2005	Redondela		
2005–2006	Lobelle		
2006–2007	Nazareno	18	(10)
2007–2011	Lobelle	105	(28)
2011–2021	Inter Movistar	253	(110)
2021	SC Braga	23	(9)

International career
- Spain
- * Club domestic league appearances and goals as of 15 June 2021

Adrián Alonso Pereira (born 26 June 1988), commonly known as Pola, is a Spanish futsal player who plays for Inter Movistar as an Ala.

== Honours ==
Inter FS

- 6 Primera Division (2014, 2015, 2016, 2017, 2018, 2020)
- 4 Copa de España (2014, 2016, 2017, 2021)
- 2 Copa del Rey (2015, 2021)
- 6 Supercopa de España (2011, 2015, 2017, 2018, 2020)
- 2 UEFA Futsal Champions League (2017, 2018)

Santiago Futsal

- 1 Copa de España (2005/06)
- 1 Supercopa de España (2010)
- 1 Campeonato de Europa sub-21 (2007)
- 3 Copas Xunta de Galicia (2009, 2010)

Spain

- Campeón Europa sub-21 2007/2008
- 1 UEFA Futsal Championship (2016)
