= France national futsal team =

France
- Nickname(s): Les Bleus ("The Blues"); L'Equipe tricolore ("The Tri-color Team")
- Association: Fédération Française de Football
- Confederation: UEFA (Europe)
- Head coach: Raphaël Reynaud
- Captain: Abdessamad Mohammed
- FIFA code: FRA
- FIFA ranking: 10 (24 September 2026)
- Highest FIFA ranking: 10 (May 2024 – April 2025)
Home colours	Away colours

First international
- Belgium 1–3 France (Mouscron, Belgium; March 17, 1997)

Biggest win
- France 12–0 San Marino (Nice, France; January 23, 2013)

Biggest defeat
- Ukraine 12–0 France (Ljubljana, Slovenia; February 20, 2000)

FIFA World Cup
- Appearances: 1 (First in 2024)
- Best result: Fourth place (2024)

UEFA Futsal Championship
- Appearances: 2 (First in 2018)
- Best result: Fourth place (2026)

The France national futsal team represents the French Football Federation, the governing body for futsal in France, in international futsal competitions, such as the FIFA Futsal World Cup and the European Championships.

== Competition history ==
=== FIFA Futsal World Cup ===
FIFA Futsal World Cup Record
Year	Round	Position	Pld	W	D	L	GS	GA
(Netherlands) 1989	Did not enter							
(Hong Kong) 1992	Did not enter							
(Spain) 1996	Did not enter							
(Guatemala) 2000	Did not qualify							
(Chinese Taipei) 2004	Did not qualify							
(Brazil) 2008	Did not enter							
(Thailand) 2012	Did not qualify							
(Colombia) 2016	Did not qualify							
(Lithuania) 2021	Did not qualify							
(Uzbekistan) 2024	Third place match	Fourth place	7	4	0	3	24	23
Total:1/10	Third place match	Fourth place	7	4	0	3	24	23

=== UEFA Futsal Championship ===
UEFA Futsal Championship record
Year	Round	Position	Pld	W	D	L	GS	GA
(Spain) 1996	Did not enter							
(Spain) 1999	Did not qualify							
(Russia) 2001	Did not qualify							
(Italy) 2003	Did not qualify							
(Czech Republic) 2005	Did not qualify							
(Portugal) 2007	Did not qualify							
(Hungary) 2010	Did not qualify							
(Croatia) 2012	Did not qualify							
(Belgium) 2014	Did not qualify							
(Serbia) 2016	Did not qualify							
(Slovenia) 2018	Group Stage	10th	2	0	1	1	7	9
(Netherlands) 2022	Did not qualify							
(Latvia) (Lithuania) (Slovenia) 2026	Third place match	Fourth place	6	3	2	1	20	14
Total:2/13	Third place match	Fourth place	8	3	3	2	27	23

== Players ==
=== Current squad ===
The following players were called up to the squad for the UEFA 2024 FIFA Futsal World Cup qualification matches against Norway and Serbia on 2 and 7 March 2023, respectively.
Head coach: Raphaël Reynaud

No.	Pos.	Player	Date of birth (age)	Caps	Club
1	GK	Joévin Durot	25 November 1985 (age 40)		(Belgium) FT Antwerpen
12	GK	Louis Marquet	15 May 1993 (age 33)		(France) Étoile Lavalloise
16	GK	Francis Lokoka	8 September 1993 (age 33)		(France) Nantes Métropole
2	DF	Sid Belhaj	28 August 1992 (age 34)		(France) Sporting Paris
6	DF	Kévin Ramirez (captain)	10 August 1987 (age 39)		(France) Mouvaux Lille
20	DF	Souheil Mouhoudine	29 March 1995 (age 31)		(France) Étoile Lavalloise
22	DF	Amin Benslama	13 May 2003 (age 23)		(Spain) Ribera Navarra
3	FW	Mamadou Touré	15 September 2001 (age 25)		(Spain) Barça Atlètic
5	FW	Youness Ahssen	27 August 1994 (age 32)		(France) UJS Toulouse
7	FW	Ronny Zakehi	8 April 1989 (age 37)		(France) Mouvaux Lille
8	FW	Ayoub Saadaoui	14 December 1994 (age 31)		(France) Sporting Paris
9	FW	Nelson Lutin	5 December 1997 (age 28)		(Italy) Meta Catania
10	FW	Abdessamad Mohammed	10 December 1990 (age 35)		(France) Étoile Lavalloise
14	FW	Ouassini Guirio	14 December 2000 (age 25)		(France) Nantes Métropole
17	FW	Steve Bendali	12 November 1994 (age 31)		(France) Nantes Métropole
21	FW	Boulaye Ba	27 August 1993 (age 33)		(France) Sporting Paris

=== Recent call-ups ===
The following players have also been called up to the squad within the last 12 months.

Pos.	Player	Date of birth (age)	Caps	Goals	Club	Latest call-up
GK	Thibaut Garros	2 January 2003 (age 23)			(France) UJS Toulouse	v. Egypt, 19 December 2022
GK	Maarouf Kerroumi	1 June 1994 (age 32)			(France) Toulon Élite	v. Brazil, 6 April 2022
DF	Mamadou Touré	27 January 1998 (age 28)			(France) Paris ACASA	v. Egypt, 19 December 2022
DF	Mickaël de Sá Andrade	14 August 1995 (age 31)			(France) UJS Toulouse	v. Egypt, 19 December 2022
FW	Nicolás Menendez	3 February 1996 (age 30)			(France) Béthune Futsal	v. Egypt, 19 December 2022
FW	Youba Soumaré	9 March 1993 (age 33)			(France) Sporting Paris	v. Egypt, 19 December 2022
FW	Landry N'Gala	8 June 1993 (age 33)			(France) Sporting Paris	v. Moldova, 9 November 2022
FW	Nama Traoré	23 April 2001 (age 25)			(France) Marcouville City	v. Moldova, 9 November 2022
FW	Arthur Tchapthet	2 November 1995 (age 30)			(France) Kremlin-Bicêtre	v. Moldova, 9 November 2022
^{COV} Player withdrew from the squad due to contracting COVID-19.^{INJ} Player withdrew from the squad due to an injury.^{PRE} Preliminary squad.^{RET} Retired from international futsal.

== Head-to-head record ==
The following table shows France's head-to-head record in the FIFA Futsal World Cup.

Opponent	Pld	W	D	L	GF	GA	GD	Win %
Argentina	1	0	0	1	2	3	−1	0.00
Guatemala	1	1	0	0	6	3	+3	100.00
Iran	1	0	0	1	1	4	−3	0.00
Paraguay	1	1	0	0	2	1	+1	100.00
Thailand	1	1	0	0	5	2	+3	100.00
Ukraine	1	0	0	1	1	7	−6	0.00
Venezuela	1	1	0	0	7	3	+4	100.00
Total	7	4	0	3	24	23	+1	57.14
