= 2003 UEFA Futsal Championship =

Campionato Europeo di Futsal 2003

Tournament details
- Host country: Italy
- Dates: 17–24 February
- Teams: 8 (from 1 confederation)
- Venue: 2 (in 2 host cities)

Final positions
- Champions: Italy (1st title)
- Runners-up: Ukraine
- Third place: Czech Republic
- Fourth place: Spain

Tournament statistics
- Top scorer: (Ukraine) Serhiy Koridze (7 goals)
- Best player: (Italy) Vinícius Bácaro

The 2003 UEFA Futsal Championship was the fourth official edition of the UEFA-governed European Championship for national futsal teams. It was held in Italy, between 17 February and 24 February 2003, in two venues located in Aversa & Caserta.

== Qualification ==
=== Qualified teams ===
Country
Italy
Czech Republic
Russia
Slovenia
Ukraine
Spain
Belgium
Portugal

== Venues ==
Venues Map

| Arena | Palazzetto dello Sport | PalaMaggiò |
|---|---|---|
| City | Aversa | Caserta |
| Capacity | 8,000 | 8,000 |

== Group stage ==
=== Group A ===
| Team | Pld | W | D | L | GF | GA | Pts |
|---|---|---|---|---|---|---|---|
| Italy | 3 | 3 | 0 | 0 | 8 | 2 | 9 |
| Czech Republic | 3 | 2 | 0 | 1 | 11 | 9 | 6 |
| Russia | 3 | 1 | 0 | 2 | 5 | 6 | 3 |
| Slovenia | 3 | 0 | 0 | 3 | 7 | 14 | 0 |

17 February 2003

| Czech Republic | 2–1 | Russia |

Palazzetto dello Sport, Aversa

17 February 2003

| Italy | 2–1 | Slovenia |

Palazzetto dello Sport, Aversa

18 February 2003

| Slovenia | 3–4 | Russia |

PalaMaggiò, Caserta

18 February 2003

| Italy | 5–1 | Czech Republic |

PalaMaggiò, Caserta

20 February 2003

| Russia | 0–1 | Italy |

Palazzetto dello Sport, Aversa

20 February 2003

| Slovenia | 3–8 | Czech Republic |

PalaMaggiò, Caserta

=== Group B ===
| Team | Pld | W | D | L | GF | GA | Pts |
|---|---|---|---|---|---|---|---|
| Ukraine | 3 | 2 | 0 | 1 | 14 | 9 | 6 |
| Spain | 3 | 1 | 2 | 0 | 7 | 4 | 5 |
| Portugal | 3 | 1 | 1 | 1 | 10 | 12 | 4 |
| Belgium | 3 | 0 | 1 | 2 | 5 | 11 | 1 |

17 February 2003

| Belgium | 2–7 | Ukraine |

PalaMaggiò, Caserta

17 February 2003

| Spain | 3–3 | Portugal |

PalaMaggiò, Caserta

18 February 2003

| Spain | 1–1 | Belgium |

Palazzetto dello Sport, Aversa

18 February 2003

| Portugal | 4–7 | Ukraine |

Palazzetto dello Sport, Aversa

20 February 2003

| Ukraine | 0–3 | Spain |

Palazzetto dello Sport, Aversa

20 February 2003

| Portugal | 3–2 | Belgium |

PalaMaggiò, Caserta

== Knockout stage ==
Semi-finals
22 February 2003 – Caserta
Italy | 2
Spain | 1
22 February 2003 – Caserta
Ukraine | 5
Czech Republic | 1

Final
24 February 2003 – Caserta
Italy | 1
Ukraine | 0

=== Semi-finals ===
22 February 2003

| Italy | 2–1 | Spain |
|---|---|---|
| | Report |

PalaMaggiò, Caserta
Attendance: 6000

22 February 2003

| Ukraine | 5–1 | Czech Republic |
|---|---|---|
| | Report |

PalaMaggiò, Caserta
Attendance: 1500

=== Final ===
24 February 2003

| Italy | 1–0 | Ukraine |
|---|---|---|
| | Report |

PalaMaggiò, Caserta
Attendance: 6000

== Champions ==
2003 UEFA Futsal Championship winners

Italy
First title

== Tournament ranking ==
Per statistical convention in football, matches decided in extra time are counted as wins and losses, while matches decided by penalty shoot-out are counted as draws.

| Pos | Team | Pld | W | D | L | GF | GA | GD | Pts | Final result |
|---|---|---|---|---|---|---|---|---|---|---|
| 1 | Italy | 5 | 5 | 0 | 0 | 11 | 3 | +8 | 15 | Champions |
| 2 | Ukraine | 5 | 3 | 0 | 2 | 19 | 11 | +8 | 9 | Runners-up |
| 3 | Czech Republic | 4 | 2 | 0 | 2 | 12 | 14 | –2 | 6 | Third place |
| 4 | Spain | 4 | 1 | 2 | 1 | 8 | 6 | +2 | 5 | Fourth place |
| 5 | Portugal | 3 | 1 | 1 | 1 | 10 | 12 | –2 | 4 | Eliminated in Group stage |
| 6 | Russia | 3 | 1 | 0 | 2 | 5 | 6 | –1 | 3 | Eliminated in Group stage |
| 7 | Belgium | 3 | 0 | 1 | 2 | 5 | 11 | –6 | 1 | Eliminated in Group stage |
| 8 | Slovenia | 3 | 0 | 0 | 3 | 7 | 14 | –7 | 0 | Eliminated in Group stage |
