= UEFA Futsal Euro 2016 qualifying =

Tournament details
- Dates: 14 January – 22 September 2015
- Teams: 45 (from 1 confederation)

Tournament statistics
- Matches played: 86
- Goals scored: 515 (5.99 per match)
- Top scorer: (Ukraine) Mykola Bilotserkivets (8 goals)

The UEFA Futsal Euro 2016 qualifying competition was a men's futsal competition that determined the 11 teams joining the automatically qualified hosts Serbia in the UEFA Futsal Euro 2016 final tournament.

The national teams from a total of 45 UEFA member associations entered the qualifying competition. Scotland made their UEFA Futsal Euro qualifying debut.

== Format ==
The qualifying competition consisted of three rounds:

- Preliminary round: The 24 lowest-ranked teams were drawn into six groups of four teams. Each group was played in single round-robin format at one of the teams which were pre-selected as hosts. The six group winners and the best runner-up advanced to the main round.
- Main round: The 28 teams (21 highest-ranked teams and seven preliminary round qualifiers) were drawn into seven groups of four teams. Each group was played in single round-robin format at one of the teams which were pre-selected as hosts. The seven group winners qualified for the final tournament, while the seven runners-up and the best third-placed team advanced to the play-offs.
- Play-offs: The eight teams were drawn into four ties to play home-and-away two-legged matches to determine the last four qualified teams.

=== Tiebreakers ===
In the preliminary round and main round, the teams were ranked according to points (3 points for a win, 1 point for a draw, 0 points for a loss). If two or more teams were equal on points on completion of a mini-tournament, the following tie-breaking criteria were applied, in the order given, to determine the rankings:

1. Higher number of points obtained in the mini-tournament matches played among the teams in question;
2. Superior goal difference resulting from the mini-tournament matches played among the teams in question;
3. Higher number of goals scored in the mini-tournament matches played among the teams in question;
4. If, after having applied criteria 1 to 3, teams still had an equal ranking, criteria 1 to 3 were reapplied exclusively to the mini-tournament matches between the teams in question to determine their final rankings. If this procedure did not lead to a decision, criteria 5 to 10 applied;
5. Superior goal difference in all mini-tournament matches;
6. Higher number of goals scored in all mini-tournament matches;
7. If only two teams had the same number of points, and they were tied according to criteria 1 to 6 after having met in the last round of the mini-tournament, their rankings were determined by a penalty shoot-out (not used if more than two teams had the same number of points, or if their rankings were not relevant for qualification for the next stage).
8. Lower disciplinary points total based only on yellow and red cards received in the mini-tournament matches (red card = 3 points, yellow card = 1 point, expulsion for two yellow cards in one match = 3 points);
9. Coefficient ranking;
10. Drawing of lots.

To determine the best runner-up in the preliminary round and the best third-placed team in the main round, the following criteria were applied:

1. Higher number of points;
2. Superior goal difference;
3. Higher number of goals scored;
4. Lower disciplinary points total based only on yellow and red cards received (red card = 3 points, yellow card = 1 point, expulsion for two yellow cards in one match = 3 points);
5. Coefficient ranking;
6. Drawing of lots.

In the play-offs, the team that scored more goals on aggregate over the two legs qualified for the final tournament. If the aggregate score was level, the away goals rule was applied, i.e., the team that scored more goals away from home over the two legs advanced. If away goals were also equal, extra time was played. The away goals rule was again applied after extra time, i.e., if there were goals scored during extra time and the aggregate score was still level, the visiting team advanced by virtue of more away goals scored. If no goals were scored during extra time, the tie was decided by penalty shoot-out.

== Schedule ==
The qualifying matches were played on the following dates.

| Stage | Dates |
|---|---|
| Preliminary round | 14–17 January 2015 |
| Main round | 18–21 March 2015 |
| Play-offs | 15 & 22 September 2015 |

== Entrants ==
The teams were ranked according to their coefficient ranking, calculated based on the following:

- UEFA Futsal Euro 2012 final tournament and qualifying competition
- 2012 FIFA Futsal World Cup final tournament and qualifying competition
- UEFA Futsal Euro 2014 final tournament and qualifying competition

The 21 highest-ranked teams entered the main round, while the 24 lowest-ranked teams entered the preliminary round. The coefficient ranking was also used for seeding in the preliminary round and main round draws.

Teams entering main round

Seeding position 1
| Team | Coeff | Rank |
|---|---|---|
| Spain | 8.410 | 1 |
| Italy | 8.278 | 2 |
| Russia | 8.167 | 3 |
| Portugal | 7.000 | 4 |
| Ukraine | 5.889 | 5 |
| Croatia (H) | 4.667 | 6 |
| Czech Republic | 4.528 | 7 |

Seeding position 2
| Team | Coeff | Rank |
|---|---|---|
| Romania (H) | 4.444 | 9 |
| Slovenia (H) | 4.167 | 10 |
| Azerbaijan (H) | 3.722 | 11 |
| Hungary | 2.667 | 12 |
| Slovakia | 2.556 | 13 |
| Netherlands | 2.167 | 14 |
| Belarus | 2.111 | 15 |

Seeding position 3
| Team | Coeff | Rank |
|---|---|---|
| Belgium | 1.944 | 16 |
| Bosnia and Herzegovina (H) | 1.778 | 17 |
| Turkey | 1.722 | 18 |
| Kazakhstan | 1.667 | 19 |
| Poland (H) | 1.444 | 20 |
| North Macedonia (H) | 1.333 | 21 |
| Norway | 1.222 | 22 |

Teams entering preliminary round

Seeding position 1
| Team | Coeff | Rank |
|---|---|---|
| Latvia | 1.167 | 23 |
| France | 1.056 | 24 |
| Finland | 1.000 | 25 |
| Georgia | 0.917 | 26 |
| Greece | 0.833 | 27 |
| Israel | 0.833 | 28 |

Seeding position 2
| Team | Coeff | Rank |
|---|---|---|
| Moldova (H) | 0.694 | 29 |
| England | 0.667 | 30 |
| Montenegro (H) | 0.611 | 31 |
| Lithuania (H) | 0.611 | 32 |
| Bulgaria (H) | 0.611 | 33 |
| Armenia | 0.444 | 34 |

Seeding position 3
| Team | Coeff | Rank |
|---|---|---|
| Andorra | 0.389 | 35 |
| Albania | 0.389 | 36 |
| Sweden (H) | 0.333 | 37 |
| Cyprus | 0.333 | 38 |
| Denmark | 0.222 | 39 |
| Switzerland | 0.222 | 40 |

Seeding position 4
| Team | Coeff | Rank |
|---|---|---|
| Gibraltar | 0.111 | 42 |
| Estonia | 0.000 | 43 |
| Wales | 0.000 | 44 |
| Malta (H) | 0.000 | 45 |
| San Marino | 0.000 | 46 |
| Scotland | 0.000 | No rank |

Notes

- Serbia (Coeff: 4.528; Rank: 8) qualified automatically for the final tournament as hosts.
- Iceland (Coeff: 0.222; Rank 41), Republic of Ireland (Coeff: 0.000; Rank 47), Austria (no rank), Faroe Islands (no rank), Germany (no rank), Liechtenstein (no rank), Luxembourg (no rank), and Northern Ireland (no rank) did not enter.
- Teams which were pre-selected as preliminary round or main round hosts were denoted by (H).

The draws for the preliminary round and main round were held on 26 September 2014, 14:00 CEST (UTC+2), at the UEFA headquarters in Nyon, Switzerland. Each group in the preliminary round and main round contained one team from each of the seeding positions 1–4. The seven teams which qualified from the preliminary round, whose identity was not known at the time of the draw, were placed in seeding position 4 for the main round draw. In both draws, the teams which were pre-selected as hosts were drawn from a separate pot, while being placed in their groups according to their seeding positions. For political reasons, Azerbaijan and Armenia (due to the disputed status of Nagorno-Karabakh), as well as Spain and Gibraltar (due to the disputed status of Gibraltar), could not be drawn in the same group.

== Preliminary round ==
All times were CET (UTC+1).

=== Group A ===
| Pos | Team | Pld | W | D | L | GF | GA | GD | Pts | Qualification |
|---|---|---|---|---|---|---|---|---|---|---|
| 1 | Denmark | 3 | 2 | 1 | 0 | 15 | 3 | +12 | 7 | Main round |
| 2 | Bulgaria (H) | 3 | 2 | 1 | 0 | 8 | 5 | +3 | 7 | |
| 3 | Greece | 3 | 1 | 0 | 2 | 5 | 7 | −2 | 3 | |
| 4 | Gibraltar | 3 | 0 | 0 | 3 | 2 | 15 | −13 | 0 | |

Source: UEFA
Rules for classification: Qualification tiebreakers
(H) Hosts
14 January 2015
14:00

| Greece | 3–0 | Gibraltar |
|---|---|---|
| Mourdoukoutas 3'; Delaportas 34'; Manos 40' | Report |

Skaptopara Sports Hall, Blagoevgrad
Referee: Gerd Bylois (Belgium), Costas Nicolaou (Cyprus)
14 January 2015
17:30

| Bulgaria | 2–2 | Denmark |
|---|---|---|
| Dimov 32', 38' | Report | Jørgensen 4'; Ji. Jensen 28' |

Skaptopara Sports Hall, Blagoevgrad
Referee: Saša Tomić (Croatia), Ibrahim El Jilali (Netherlands)

15 January 2015
14:00

| Denmark | 4–0 | Greece |
|---|---|---|
| Hauglund 8'; Jørgensen 25'; Larsen 31'; Falck 38' | Report |

Skaptopara Sports Hall, Blagoevgrad
Referee: Costas Nicolaou (Cyprus), Gerd Bylois (Belgium)
15 January 2015
17:30

| Bulgaria | 3–1 | Gibraltar |
|---|---|---|
| Dimov 9'; Karageorgiev 16'; Stoykov 21' | Report | I. Robba 5' |

Skaptopara Sports Hall, Blagoevgrad
Referee: Ibrahim El Jilali (Netherlands), Saša Tomić (Croatia)

17 January 2015
16:00

| Gibraltar | 1–9 | Denmark |
|---|---|---|
| Collado 22' | Report | M. Jensen 2', 37'; Ja. Jensen 13'; Falck 15', 25', 29', 36'; Hauglund 21'; Jørgensen 40' (pen.) |

Skaptopara Sports Hall, Blagoevgrad
Referee: Gerd Bylois (Belgium), Costas Nicolaou (Cyprus)
17 January 2015
18:30

| Greece | 2–3 | Bulgaria |
|---|---|---|
| V. Asimakopoulos 24'; Iliadis 38' (pen.) | Report | Stoykov 27'; Karageorgiev 32'; Shutev 40' |

Skaptopara Sports Hall, Blagoevgrad
Referee: Saša Tomić (Croatia), Ibrahim El Jilali (Netherlands)

=== Group B ===
| Pos | Team | Pld | W | D | L | GF | GA | GD | Pts | Qualification |
|---|---|---|---|---|---|---|---|---|---|---|
| 1 | Finland | 3 | 3 | 0 | 0 | 10 | 0 | +10 | 9 | Main round |
| 2 | Montenegro (H) | 3 | 2 | 0 | 1 | 6 | 3 | +3 | 6 | |
| 3 | Wales | 3 | 1 | 0 | 2 | 3 | 6 | −3 | 3 | |
| 4 | Cyprus | 3 | 0 | 0 | 3 | 1 | 11 | −10 | 0 | |

Source: UEFA
Rules for classification: Qualification tiebreakers
(H) Hosts
14 January 2015
18:00

| Finland | 3–0 | Wales |
|---|---|---|
| Autio 7'; M. Kytölä 12', 29' | Report |

Morača Sports Center, Podgorica
Referee: Eduardo Fernandes Coelho (Portugal), Torbjorn Eidhammer (Norway)
14 January 2015
21:15

| Montenegro | 4–0 | Cyprus |
|---|---|---|
| Bajović 8', 34'; Drašković 12'; Bajčetić 28' | Report |

Morača Sports Center, Podgorica
Referee: Francisco Diaz (Spain), Kalin Kinov (Bulgaria)

15 January 2015
18:00

| Cyprus | 0–5 | Finland |
|---|---|---|
| | Report | J. Kytölä 2'; Autio 7', 24', 31', 33' |

Morača Sports Center, Podgorica
Referee: Francisco Diaz (Spain), Torbjorn Eidhammer (Norway)
15 January 2015
21:15

| Montenegro | 2–1 | Wales |
|---|---|---|
| Bajović 8'; Maynard 28' (o.g.) | Report | Hugh 2' |

Morača Sports Center, Podgorica
Referee: Kalin Kinov (Bulgaria), Eduardo Fernandes Coelho (Portugal)

17 January 2015
16:00

| Wales | 2–1 | Cyprus |
|---|---|---|
| Hooper 10'; Thomas 18' | Report | Iacovou 36' |

Morača Sports Center, Podgorica
Referee: Torbjorn Eidhammer (Norway), Kalin Kinov (Bulgaria)
17 January 2015
18:30

| Finland | 2–0 | Montenegro |
|---|---|---|
| M. Kytölä 20', 36' | Report |

Morača Sports Center, Podgorica
Referee: Eduardo Fernandes Coelho (Portugal), Francisco Diaz (Spain)

=== Group C ===
| Pos | Team | Pld | W | D | L | GF | GA | GD | Pts | Qualification |
|---|---|---|---|---|---|---|---|---|---|---|
| 1 | Georgia | 3 | 2 | 1 | 0 | 15 | 6 | +9 | 7 | Main round |
| 2 | Switzerland | 3 | 2 | 1 | 0 | 13 | 9 | +4 | 7 | Main round |
| 3 | Lithuania (H) | 3 | 1 | 0 | 2 | 10 | 15 | −5 | 3 | |
| 4 | Estonia | 3 | 0 | 0 | 3 | 10 | 18 | −8 | 0 | |

Source: UEFA
Rules for classification: Qualification tiebreakers
(H) Hosts
14 January 2015
16:30

| Georgia | 6–3 | Estonia |
|---|---|---|
| Roni 1'; Dzabiradze 2', 7'; Tikurishvili 17'; Sebiskveradze 37', 40' | Report | Aleksejev 26'; Taska 38'; Paapsi 40' |

Kaunas Sports Hall, Kaunas
Referee: Gavin Sartain (England), Vyacheslav Daragan (Ukraine)
14 January 2015
19:00

| Lithuania | 3–5 | Switzerland |
|---|---|---|
| Jeremejev 2', 16'; Buinickij 39' | Report | Acosta 5', 40'; Santona 33'; Facchinetti 34' (pen.), 37' |

Kaunas Sports Hall, Kaunas
Referee: Gerald Bauernfeind (Austria), Septimiu Burtescu (Romania)

15 January 2015
16:30

| Switzerland | 1–1 | Georgia |
|---|---|---|
| Mezger 39' | Report | Sebiskveradze 6' |

Kaunas Sports Hall, Kaunas
Referee: Septimiu Burtescu (Romania), Gerald Bauernfeind (Austria)
15 January 2015
19:00

| Lithuania | 5–2 | Estonia |
|---|---|---|
| Sendžikas 15', 29'; Zagurskas 28'; Buinickij 31'; Bezykornovas 34' | Report | Tšurilkin 9'; Aleksejev 21' |

Kaunas Sports Hall, Kaunas
Referee: Vyacheslav Daragan (Ukraine), Gavin Sartain (England)

17 January 2015
16:00

| Estonia | 5–7 | Switzerland |
|---|---|---|
| Taska 24'; Starodub 27'; Rubel 30'; Tšurilkin 39' (pen.); Aleksejev 40' (pen.) | Report | Balvis Gonzalez 6', 21', 31', 38'; Facchinetti 11' (pen.); Mezger 25'; Rueegsegger 35' |

Kaunas Sports Hall, Kaunas
Referee: Vyacheslav Daragan (Ukraine), Septimiu Burtescu (Romania)
17 January 2015
18:30

| Georgia | 8–2 | Lithuania |
|---|---|---|
| Tikurishvili 5', 21'; Lukava 20'; Altunashvili 22'; Sebiskveradze 24', 33'; Maisaia 27'; Jvarashvili 36' | Report | Bezykornovas 5'; Buinickij 34' |

Kaunas Sports Hall, Kaunas
Referee: Gerald Bauernfeind (Austria), Gavin Sartain (England)

=== Group D ===
| Pos | Team | Pld | W | D | L | GF | GA | GD | Pts | Qualification |
|---|---|---|---|---|---|---|---|---|---|---|
| 1 | France | 3 | 3 | 0 | 0 | 14 | 5 | +9 | 9 | Main round |
| 2 | Moldova (H) | 3 | 2 | 0 | 1 | 13 | 6 | +7 | 6 | |
| 3 | Albania | 3 | 1 | 0 | 2 | 15 | 9 | +6 | 3 | |
| 4 | San Marino | 3 | 0 | 0 | 3 | 1 | 23 | −22 | 0 | |

Source: UEFA
Rules for classification: Qualification tiebreakers
(H) Hosts
14 January 2015
15:00

| France | 5–1 | San Marino |
|---|---|---|
| Belhaj 2'; Ramirez 13', 20'; Rabei 22'; Teixeira 35' | Report | Macina 17' |

FMF Arena, Ciorescu
Referee: Franco Cachia (Malta), Vladan Radulović (Serbia)
14 January 2015
17:30

| Moldova | 4–2 | Albania |
|---|---|---|
| Obadă 3', 28'; Tacot 17' (pen.); Laşcu 36' (pen.) | Report | Kaca 25', 40' |

FMF Arena, Ciorescu
Referee: Ivan Shabanov (Russia), Arsen Nonikashvili (Georgia)

15 January 2015
15:00

| Albania | 2–5 | France |
|---|---|---|
| Brahimi 11'; Selmanaj 27' | Report | Aigoun 2'; Rabei 5', 12', 22'; Belhaj 37' |

FMF Arena, Ciorescu
Referee: Franco Cachia (Malta), Arsen Nonikashvili (Georgia)
15 January 2015
17:30

| Moldova | 7–0 | San Marino |
|---|---|---|
| A. Munteanu 8'; Obadă 8'; Tacot 23'; Ţîmbalist 25'; Hilotii 30'; Podlesnov 31'; Gojan 37' | Report |

FMF Arena, Ciorescu
Referee: Vladan Radulović (Serbia), Ivan Shabanov (Russia)

17 January 2015
16:00

| San Marino | 0–11 | Albania |
|---|---|---|
| | Report | Mejzini 4', 32', 38'; Hoxha 6', 40'; Kaca 18', 20'; Halimi 25'; Brahimi 29', 38'; Selmanaj 39' |

FMF Arena, Ciorescu
Referee: Arsen Nonikashvili (Georgia), Vladan Radulović (Serbia)
17 January 2015
18:30

| France | 4–2 | Moldova |
|---|---|---|
| Otmani 16'; Teixeira 16'; Belhaj 36'; Gasmi 40' | Report | Obadă 29'; Hilotii 31' |

FMF Arena, Ciorescu
Referee: Ivan Shabanov (Russia), Franco Cachia (Malta)

=== Group E ===
| Pos | Team | Pld | W | D | L | GF | GA | GD | Pts | Qualification |
|---|---|---|---|---|---|---|---|---|---|---|
| 1 | Latvia | 3 | 2 | 1 | 0 | 13 | 4 | +9 | 7 | Main round |
| 2 | England | 3 | 2 | 1 | 0 | 8 | 4 | +4 | 7 | |
| 3 | Andorra | 3 | 1 | 0 | 2 | 8 | 6 | +2 | 3 | |
| 4 | Malta (H) | 3 | 0 | 0 | 3 | 0 | 15 | −15 | 0 | |

Source: UEFA
Rules for classification: Qualification tiebreakers
(H) Hosts
14 January 2015
17:00

| Latvia | 3–2 | Andorra |
|---|---|---|
| Ikstēns 17'; Avanesovs 20'; Seņs 35' | Report | Cabinho 39'; Llamas 40' (pen.) |

Hibernians Pavillon, Paola
Attendance: 60
Referee: Josip Barton (Macedonia), Borut Šivic (Slovenia)
14 January 2015
19:30

| Malta | 0–3 | England |
|---|---|---|
| | Report | Parkes 3'; Ballinger 28'; Rexha 39' |

Hibernians Pavillon, Paola
Attendance: 727
Referee: Gábor Kovács (Hungary), Yusif Nurullayev (Azerbaijan)

15 January 2015
17:00

| England | 2–2 | Latvia |
|---|---|---|
| Cook 13', 34' | Report | Šustrovs 11'; Ikstēns 13' |

Hibernians Pavillon, Paola
Attendance: 62
Referee: Yusif Nurullayev (Azerbaijan), Josip Barton (Macedonia)
15 January 2015
19:30

| Malta | 0–4 | Andorra |
|---|---|---|
| | Report | Barbosa 8', 32'; Llamas 13', 20' |

Hibernians Pavillon, Paola
Attendance: 255
Referee: Borut Šivic (Slovenia), Gábor Kovács (Hungary)

17 January 2015
16:00

| Andorra | 2–3 | England |
|---|---|---|
| Perez 15'; Raventós 30' | Report | Nash 9'; Parkes 12'; Ballinger 20' |

Hibernians Pavillon, Paola
Attendance: 145
Referee: Borut Šivic (Slovenia), Gábor Kovács (Hungary)
17 January 2015
18:30

| Latvia | 8–0 | Malta |
|---|---|---|
| Seņs 1'; Aleksejevs 1', 28'; Dacko 2'; Avanesovs 3'; Jerofejevs 10', 15'; Šustrovs 25' | Report |

Hibernians Pavillon, Paola
Attendance: 500
Referee: Yusif Nurullayev (Azerbaijan), Josip Barton (Macedonia)

=== Group F ===
| Pos | Team | Pld | W | D | L | GF | GA | GD | Pts | Qualification |
|---|---|---|---|---|---|---|---|---|---|---|
| 1 | Armenia | 3 | 2 | 1 | 0 | 12 | 6 | +6 | 7 | Main round |
| 2 | Sweden (H) | 3 | 2 | 0 | 1 | 20 | 4 | +16 | 6 | |
| 3 | Israel | 3 | 1 | 1 | 1 | 8 | 7 | +1 | 4 | |
| 4 | Scotland | 3 | 0 | 0 | 3 | 2 | 25 | −23 | 0 | |

Source: UEFA
Rules for classification: Qualification tiebreakers
(H) Hosts
14 January 2015
17:30

| Israel | 6–1 | Scotland |
|---|---|---|
| Yates 9' (o.g.); I. Shkolnik 15'; Sabag 20'; Vana 22'; Cohen 27'; Kalimi 30' | Report | Lafferty 28' |

Arena Skövde, Skövde
Referee: Dragan Skakić (Bosnia and Herzegovina), Cédric Pelissier (France)
14 January 2015
19:45

| Sweden | 3–4 | Armenia |
|---|---|---|
| Mönell 2'; Eteus 17'; Asp 32' | Report | H. Grigoryan 5'; Karapetyan 16', 27'; Babayan 21' |

Arena Skövde, Skövde
Referee: Fabio Gelonese (Italy), Timo Onatsu (Finland)

15 January 2015
17:30

| Armenia | 2–2 | Israel |
|---|---|---|
| H. Grigoryan 35'; Sujyan 38' | Report | Cohen 19'; Sabag 34' |

Arena Skövde, Skövde
Referee: Timo Onatsu (Finland), Cédric Pelissier (France)
15 January 2015
19:45

| Sweden | 13–0 | Scotland |
|---|---|---|
| Legiec 10', 27', 36'; Asp 18'; Burda 20'; S. Abraham 25', 32', 38'; Eteus 30'; H. Abraham 31'; Hiseni 33'; Mönell 34', 35' | Report |

Arena Skövde, Skövde
Referee: Fabio Gelonese (Italy), Dragan Skakić (Bosnia and Herzegovina)

17 January 2015
16:00

| Scotland | 1–6 | Armenia |
|---|---|---|
| Hay 38' | Report | Galstyan 14'; Mardanyan 20', 39'; Kapukranyan 30'; Sujyan 35'; H. Grigoryan 38' |

Arena Skövde, Skövde
Referee: Dragan Skakić (Bosnia and Herzegovina), Fabio Gelonese (Italy)
17 January 2015
18:30

| Israel | 0–4 | Sweden |
|---|---|---|
| | Report | Legiec 15'; Rashidi 18'; Eteus 22'; H. Abraham 29' |

Arena Skövde, Skövde
Referee: Cédric Pelissier (France), Timo Onatsu (Finland)

=== Ranking of second-placed teams ===
| Pos | Grp | Team | Pld | W | D | L | GF | GA | GD | Pts | Qualification |
|---|---|---|---|---|---|---|---|---|---|---|---|
| 1 | C | Switzerland | 3 | 2 | 1 | 0 | 13 | 9 | +4 | 7 | Main round |
| 2 | E | England | 3 | 2 | 1 | 0 | 8 | 4 | +4 | 7 | |
| 3 | A | Bulgaria | 3 | 2 | 1 | 0 | 8 | 5 | +3 | 7 | |
| 4 | F | Sweden | 3 | 2 | 0 | 1 | 20 | 4 | +16 | 6 | |
| 5 | D | Moldova | 3 | 2 | 0 | 1 | 13 | 6 | +7 | 6 | |
| 6 | B | Montenegro | 3 | 2 | 0 | 1 | 6 | 3 | +3 | 6 | |

Source: UEFA
Rules for classification: 1) points; 2) goal difference; 3) goals scored; 4) disciplinary points; 5) coefficient; 6) drawing of lots.

== Main round ==
All times were CET (UTC+1).

=== Group 1 ===
| Pos | Team | Pld | W | D | L | GF | GA | GD | Pts | Qualification |
|---|---|---|---|---|---|---|---|---|---|---|
| 1 | Russia | 3 | 3 | 0 | 0 | 10 | 1 | +9 | 9 | Final tournament |
| 2 | Bosnia and Herzegovina (H) | 3 | 2 | 0 | 1 | 10 | 6 | +4 | 6 | Play-offs |
| 3 | Netherlands | 3 | 0 | 1 | 2 | 4 | 8 | −4 | 1 | |
| 4 | Latvia | 3 | 0 | 1 | 2 | 6 | 15 | −9 | 1 | |

Source: UEFA
Rules for classification: Qualification tiebreakers
(H) Hosts
18 March 2015
17:30

| Bosnia and Herzegovina | 2–1 | Netherlands |
|---|---|---|
| Bevanda 26', 34' | Report | Radmilović 16' (o.g.) |

Olympic Hall Juan Antonio Samaranch, Sarajevo
Attendance: 900
Referee: Ondřej Černý (Czech Republic), Karel Henych (Czech Republic)
18 March 2015
20:00

| Russia | 5–0 | Latvia |
|---|---|---|
| Abramov 10', 23'; Lyskov 14'; Batyrev 29'; Romulo 35' | Report |

Olympic Hall Juan Antonio Samaranch, Sarajevo
Attendance: 70
Referee: Sebastian Stawicki (Poland), Tomasz Frak (Poland)

19 March 2015
17:30

| Bosnia and Herzegovina | 7–3 | Latvia |
|---|---|---|
| Novoselac 1'; Hrkač 15'; Radmilović 19', 22'; Mulahmetović 26', 33'; Bevanda 40' | Report | Nagibins 27'; Seņs 34', 39' |

Olympic Hall Juan Antonio Samaranch, Sarajevo
Attendance: 300
Referee: Tomasz Frak (Poland), Ondřej Černý (Czech Republic)
19 March 2015
20:00

| Netherlands | 0–3 | Russia |
|---|---|---|
| | Report | Lyskov 2'; Pereverzev 26'; Sergeev 36' |

Olympic Hall Juan Antonio Samaranch, Sarajevo
Attendance: 50
Referee: Sebastian Stawicki (Poland), Karel Henych (Czech Republic)

21 March 2015
16:00

| Latvia | 3–3 | Netherlands |
|---|---|---|
| Nagibins 6'; Seņs 20'; Velseboer 39' (o.g.) | Report | El Ghannouti 2'; Attaibi 13'; Ikstēns 20' (o.g.) |

Olympic Hall Juan Antonio Samaranch, Sarajevo
Attendance: 50
Referee: Ondřej Černý (Czech Republic), Tomasz Frak (Poland)
21 March 2015
18:30

| Russia | 2–1 | Bosnia and Herzegovina |
|---|---|---|
| Kutuzov 8', 40' | Report | Kahvedžić 40' |

Olympic Hall Juan Antonio Samaranch, Sarajevo
Attendance: 1350
Referee: Karel Henych (Czech Republic), Sebastian Stawicki (Poland)

=== Group 2 ===
| Pos | Team | Pld | W | D | L | GF | GA | GD | Pts | Qualification |
|---|---|---|---|---|---|---|---|---|---|---|
| 1 | Spain | 3 | 3 | 0 | 0 | 21 | 2 | +19 | 9 | Final tournament |
| 2 | Hungary | 3 | 1 | 1 | 1 | 11 | 10 | +1 | 4 | Play-offs |
| 3 | North Macedonia (H) | 3 | 1 | 1 | 1 | 11 | 16 | −5 | 4 | |
| 4 | Switzerland | 3 | 0 | 0 | 3 | 9 | 24 | −15 | 0 | |

Source: UEFA
Rules for classification: Qualification tiebreakers
(H) Hosts
18 March 2015
16:30

| Spain | 9–1 | Switzerland |
|---|---|---|
| Pola 8'; Rivillos 16', 40'; Adri 18'; Raúl Campos 24'; Lin 30', 40', 40'; Alex 37' | Report | Balvis Gonzalez 17' |

Boris Trajkovski Sports Center, Skopje
Referee: Gabriel Gherman (Romania), Alessandro Malfer (Italy)
18 March 2015
19:00

| North Macedonia | 3–3 | Hungary |
|---|---|---|
| Mar. Todorovski 14', 18'; Micevski 35' | Report | Trencsényi 30'; Hosszú 35'; Agushi 39' (o.g.) |

Boris Trajkovski Sports Center, Skopje
Referee: Bogdan Sorescu (Romania), Angelo Galante (Italy)

19 March 2015
16:30

| Hungary | 0–5 | Spain |
|---|---|---|
| | Report | Miguelín 14', 25', 26'; Alex 28'; Lin 38' |

Boris Trajkovski Sports Center, Skopje
Referee: Gabriel Gherman (Romania), Bogdan Sorescu (Romania)
19 March 2015
19:00

| North Macedonia | 7–6 | Switzerland |
|---|---|---|
| Micevski 1', 2', 3', 27'; Mar. Todorovski 3', 5'; Leveski 38' | Report | Likaj 3'; Marcoyannakis 33'; Mezger 37'; Raboud 38'; Sego 39'; Patera 40' |

Boris Trajkovski Sports Center, Skopje
Referee: Angelo Galante (Italy), Alessandro Malfer (Italy)

21 March 2015
16:00

| Switzerland | 2–8 | Hungary |
|---|---|---|
| Tóth 16' (o.g.); Sego 37' | Report | Hosszú 3', 23'; Lódi 16' (pen.); Harnisch 19', 36', 39'; Németh 23'; Rábl 29' |

Boris Trajkovski Sports Center, Skopje
Referee: Bogdan Sorescu (Romania), Gabriel Gherman (Romania)
21 March 2015
18:30

| Spain | 7–1 | North Macedonia |
|---|---|---|
| Mar. Todorovski 5' (o.g.); Aicardo 7'; Pola 15'; Raúl Campos 25'; Fernandão 27'; Lin 30'; Rivillos 35' | Report | Krstevski 6' |

Boris Trajkovski Sports Center, Skopje
Referee: Alessandro Malfer (Italy), Angelo Galante (Italy)

=== Group 3 ===
| Pos | Team | Pld | W | D | L | GF | GA | GD | Pts | Qualification |
|---|---|---|---|---|---|---|---|---|---|---|
| 1 | Italy | 3 | 3 | 0 | 0 | 12 | 4 | +8 | 9 | Final tournament |
| 2 | Belarus | 3 | 1 | 1 | 1 | 3 | 2 | +1 | 4 | Play-offs |
| 3 | Finland | 3 | 1 | 0 | 2 | 3 | 8 | −5 | 3 | |
| 4 | Poland (H) | 3 | 0 | 1 | 2 | 5 | 9 | −4 | 1 | |

Source: UEFA
Rules for classification: Qualification tiebreakers
(H) Hosts
18 March 2015
16:30

| Italy | 4–0 | Finland |
|---|---|---|
| Murilo 25'; Canal 26'; Patias 29'; Ercolessi 37' | Report |

Municipal Hall Krosno, Krosno
Referee: Eduardo Fernandes Coelho (Portugal), Nuno Bogalho (Portugal)
18 March 2015
19:00

| Poland | 0–0 | Belarus |
|---|---|---|
| | Report |

Municipal Hall Krosno, Krosno
Referee: Borut Šivic (Slovenia), Admir Zahovič (Slovenia)

19 March 2015
16:30

| Belarus | 1–2 | Italy |
|---|---|---|
| Chernik 37' | Report | Gayduk 15' (o.g.); Giasson 29' |

Municipal Hall Krosno, Krosno
Referee: Admir Zahovič (Slovenia), Borut Šivic (Slovenia)
19 March 2015
19:00

| Poland | 2–3 | Finland |
|---|---|---|
| Wojciechowski 18'; Popławski 27' | Report | M. Kytölä 13'; J. Kytölä 26'; Pakola 30' |

Municipal Hall Krosno, Krosno
Referee: Nuno Bogalho (Portugal), Eduardo Fernandes Coelho (Portugal)

21 March 2015
16:00

| Finland | 0–2 | Belarus |
|---|---|---|
| | Report | Chernik 30'; Aleinikov 34' |

Municipal Hall Krosno, Krosno
Referee: Eduardo Fernandes Coelho (Portugal), Nuno Bogalho (Portugal)
21 March 2015
18:30

| Italy | 6–3 | Poland |
|---|---|---|
| Gabriel Lima 4', 27', 40'; Fortino 7', 13'; Giasson 22' | Report | Kubik 4'; Mammarella 9' (o.g.); Sobalczyk 17' |

Municipal Hall Krosno, Krosno
Referee: Borut Šivic (Slovenia), Admir Zahovič (Slovenia)

=== Group 4 ===
| Pos | Team | Pld | W | D | L | GF | GA | GD | Pts | Qualification |
|---|---|---|---|---|---|---|---|---|---|---|
| 1 | Ukraine | 3 | 3 | 0 | 0 | 17 | 6 | +11 | 9 | Final tournament |
| 2 | Azerbaijan (H) | 3 | 2 | 0 | 1 | 16 | 6 | +10 | 6 | Play-offs |
| 3 | Belgium | 3 | 1 | 0 | 2 | 8 | 15 | −7 | 3 | |
| 4 | Denmark | 3 | 0 | 0 | 3 | 7 | 21 | −14 | 0 | |

Source: UEFA
Rules for classification: Qualification tiebreakers
(H) Hosts
18 March 2015
15:30

| Ukraine | 5–2 | Denmark |
|---|---|---|
| Bilotserkivets 5', 9'; D. Sorokin 5'; Ovsyannikov 10', 11' | Report | Lucht 14'; Jørgensen 38' |

Sarhadchi Olympic Sport Complex, Baku
Referee: Timo Onatsu (Finland), Lukáš Peško (Slovakia)
18 March 2015
18:00

| Azerbaijan | 3–1 | Belgium |
|---|---|---|
| Eduardo 1'; Augusto 17'; De Araujo 19' | Report | Dujacquier 38' |

Sarhadchi Olympic Sport Complex, Baku
Referee: Fernando Gutiérrez Lumbreras (Spain), Francisco Diaz (Spain)

19 March 2015
15:30

| Belgium | 2–9 | Ukraine |
|---|---|---|
| Dahbi Reda 7'; Sababti 10' | Report | Bilotserkivets 1', 12', 20', 27', 30'; D. Sorokin 24'; Bondar 28'; Ivanyak 36'; Kordoba 37' |

Sarhadchi Olympic Sport Complex, Baku
Referee: Francisco Diaz (Spain), Fernando Gutiérrez Lumbreras (Spain)
19 March 2015
18:00

| Azerbaijan | 11–2 | Denmark |
|---|---|---|
| De Araujo 7', 34'; Farajzade 13'; Borisov 18'; Amadeu 25'; Atayev 31', 38'; Augusto 32'; Chovdarov 33', 37'; Farzaliyev 36' | Report | Ja. Jensen 21'; M. Jensen 31' |

Sarhadchi Olympic Sport Complex, Baku
Referee: Lukáš Peško (Slovakia), Timo Onatsu (Finland)

21 March 2015
16:00

| Denmark | 3–5 | Belgium |
|---|---|---|
| Veis 17', 36'; Falck 39' | Report | Canaris 1'; Sababti 5', 8'; Rahou 25'; Chaibai 29' |

Sarhadchi Olympic Sport Complex, Baku
Referee: Timo Onatsu (Finland), Lukáš Peško (Slovakia)
21 March 2015
18:30

| Ukraine | 3–2 | Azerbaijan |
|---|---|---|
| Bilotserkivets 5'; O. Sorokin 27'; Ivanyak 33' | Report | Eduardo 31'; Zhurba 40' (o.g.) |

Sarhadchi Olympic Sport Complex, Baku
Referee: Fernando Gutiérrez Lumbreras (Spain), Francisco Diaz (Spain)

=== Group 5 ===
| Pos | Team | Pld | W | D | L | GF | GA | GD | Pts | Qualification |
|---|---|---|---|---|---|---|---|---|---|---|
| 1 | Slovenia (H) | 3 | 3 | 0 | 0 | 18 | 3 | +15 | 9 | Final tournament |
| 2 | Czech Republic | 3 | 2 | 0 | 1 | 10 | 6 | +4 | 6 | Play-offs |
| 3 | France | 3 | 1 | 0 | 2 | 8 | 17 | −9 | 3 | |
| 4 | Norway | 3 | 0 | 0 | 3 | 1 | 11 | −10 | 0 | |

Source: UEFA
Rules for classification: Qualification tiebreakers
(H) Hosts
18 March 2015
18:30

| Slovenia | 4–0 | Norway |
|---|---|---|
| R. Mordej 5'; Osredkar 6'; Fetić 19'; Čujec 23' | Report |

Tri Lilije Hall, Laško
Referee: Gábor Kovács (Hungary), Balázs Farkas (Hungary)
18 March 2015
20:45

| Czech Republic | 5–3 | France |
|---|---|---|
| Seidler 19'; Slováček 25'; Belej 33', 36'; Gasmi 33' (o.g.) | Report | A. Mohammed 33'; Hamdoud 37'; Gasmi 38' |

Tri Lilije Hall, Laško
Referee: Kamil Çetin (Turkey), Marc Birkett (England)

19 March 2015
17:45

| Norway | 0–4 | Czech Republic |
|---|---|---|
| | Report | Seidler 8'; Belej 18'; Novotný 27'; Kovács 37' |

Tri Lilije Hall, Laško
Referee: Marc Birkett (England), Kamil Çetin (Turkey)
19 March 2015
20:00

| Slovenia | 11–2 | France |
|---|---|---|
| Vrhovec 1', 15'; Osredkar 6', 10', 22'; Čujec 18'; Fetić 18', 23'; Melink 19'; R. Mordej 23'; Hozjan 39' | Report | Belhaj 20'; Rabei 33' |

Tri Lilije Hall, Laško
Referee: Balázs Farkas (Hungary), Gábor Kovács (Hungary)

21 March 2015
16:00

| France | 3–1 | Norway |
|---|---|---|
| Rabei 17', 28'; A. Mohammed 20' | Report | Sortevik 9' |

Tri Lilije Hall, Laško
Referee: Marc Birkett (England), Kamil Çetin (Turkey)
21 March 2015
18:30

| Czech Republic | 1–3 | Slovenia |
|---|---|---|
| Kovács 3' | Report | Melink 10'; Osredkar 12'; Vrhovec 20' |

Tri Lilije Hall, Laško
Referee: Gábor Kovács (Hungary), Balázs Farkas (Hungary)

=== Group 6 ===
| Pos | Team | Pld | W | D | L | GF | GA | GD | Pts | Qualification |
|---|---|---|---|---|---|---|---|---|---|---|
| 1 | Croatia (H) | 3 | 3 | 0 | 0 | 21 | 2 | +19 | 9 | Final tournament |
| 2 | Slovakia | 3 | 2 | 0 | 1 | 14 | 5 | +9 | 6 | Play-offs |
| 3 | Turkey | 3 | 1 | 0 | 2 | 8 | 18 | −10 | 3 | |
| 4 | Armenia | 3 | 0 | 0 | 3 | 4 | 22 | −18 | 0 | |

Source: UEFA
Rules for classification: Qualification tiebreakers
(H) Hosts
18 March 2015
17:30

| Slovakia | 7–1 | Armenia |
|---|---|---|
| Drahovský 1', 2', 36'; Rick 3', 21', 38'; Rafaj 6' | Report | H. Grigoryan 17' (pen.) |

Dubrovnik Sports Hall, Dubrovnik
Referee: Pascal Lemal (Belgium), Cédric Pelissier (France)
18 March 2015
20:00

| Croatia | 10–0 | Turkey |
|---|---|---|
| Büyüktopaç 5' (o.g.); Grbeša 11'; Grcić 13'; Jelovčić 18'; Marinović 19', 20'; Novak 25'; Djuraš 31'; Suton 33'; Babić 40' | Report |

Dubrovnik Sports Hall, Dubrovnik
Referee: Ivan Shabanov (Russia), Gerd Bylois (Belgium)

19 March 2015
17:30

| Turkey | 1–5 | Slovakia |
|---|---|---|
| Keskin 25' | Report | Rick 13', 36'; Drahovský 21'; Brunovský 29'; Bahna 40' |

Dubrovnik Sports Hall, Dubrovnik
Referee: Gerd Bylois (Belgium), Pascal Lemal (Belgium)
19 March 2015
20:00

| Croatia | 8–0 | Armenia |
|---|---|---|
| Jelovčić 6' (pen.), 14'; Grbeša 7'; Novak 12'; Grcić 14'; Marinović 15', 22'; Pandurević 31' | Report |

Dubrovnik Sports Hall, Dubrovnik
Referee: Cédric Pelissier (France), Ivan Shabanov (Russia)

21 March 2015
16:00

| Armenia | 3–7 | Turkey |
|---|---|---|
| Mardanyan 7'; Nasibyan 34'; Kapukranyan 38' | Report | Köseoğlu 19'; Erdal 24', 25'; Özcan 31', 35', 36'; Yazgan 32' |

Dubrovnik Sports Hall, Dubrovnik
Referee: Cédric Pelissier (France), Gerd Bylois (Belgium)
21 March 2015
18:30

| Slovakia | 2–3 | Croatia |
|---|---|---|
| Višváder 32'; Drahovský 34' (pen.) | Report | Marinović 12'; Grcić 18'; Jelovčić 34' |

Dubrovnik Sports Hall, Dubrovnik
Referee: Ivan Shabanov (Russia), Pascal Lemal (Belgium)

=== Group 7 ===
| Pos | Team | Pld | W | D | L | GF | GA | GD | Pts | Qualification |
|---|---|---|---|---|---|---|---|---|---|---|
| 1 | Portugal | 3 | 2 | 0 | 1 | 12 | 4 | +8 | 6 (Note: Ranked by head-to-head record (Portugal: 3 pts, +1 GD; Kazakhstan: 3 pts, 0 GD; Romania: 3 pts, −1 GD).) | Final tournament |
| 2 | Kazakhstan | 3 | 2 | 0 | 1 | 11 | 7 | +4 | 6 | Play-offs |
| 3 | Romania (H) | 3 | 2 | 0 | 1 | 11 | 9 | +2 | 6 | Play-offs |
| 4 | Georgia | 3 | 0 | 0 | 3 | 1 | 15 | −14 | 0 | |

Source: UEFA
Rules for classification: Qualification tiebreakers
(H) Hosts
Notes:
18 March 2015
14:45

| Portugal | 7–0 | Georgia |
|---|---|---|
| Cardinal 10'; Bruno Coelho 16'; Ricardinho 18', 20'; Djô 20'; Pedro Cary 35'; Paulinho 40' | Report |

Polyvalent Hall, Călărași
Referee: Oleg Ivanov (Ukraine), Vyacheslav Daragan (Ukraine)
18 March 2015
17:15

| Romania | 6–4 | Kazakhstan |
|---|---|---|
| Szőcs 1', 19', 38'; F. Matei 9'; M. Matei 29'; Răducu 40' | Report | Pershin 2'; Nurgozhin 28'; Yesenamanov 33'; Pengrin 36' |

Polyvalent Hall, Călărași
Referee: Saša Tomić (Croatia), Danijel Janošević (Croatia)

19 March 2015
14:45

| Kazakhstan | 3–1 | Portugal |
|---|---|---|
| Pengrin 28'; Pershin 36'; Higuita 40' | Report | Ricardinho 3' |

Polyvalent Hall, Călărași
Referee: Vyacheslav Daragan (Ukraine), Oleg Ivanov (Ukraine)
19 March 2015
17:15

| Romania | 4–1 | Georgia |
|---|---|---|
| Stoica 3', 23'; Mánya 26'; Răducu 37' | Report | Zedelashvili 28' |

Polyvalent Hall, Călărași
Referee: Danijel Janošević (Croatia), Saša Tomić (Croatia)

21 March 2015
16:00

| Georgia | 0–4 | Kazakhstan |
|---|---|---|
| | Report | Pershin 11'; Pengrin 19'; Chebotarev 31'; Yesenamanov 39' |

Polyvalent Hall, Călărași
Referee: Oleg Ivanov (Ukraine), Vyacheslav Daragan (Ukraine)
21 March 2015
18:30

| Portugal | 4–1 | Romania |
|---|---|---|
| Pedro Cary 18'; Ricardinho 28', 28'; Tiago Brito 39' | Report | Alpar 30' |

Polyvalent Hall, Călărași
Referee: Saša Tomić (Croatia), Danijel Janošević (Croatia)

=== Ranking of third-placed teams ===
| Pos | Grp | Team | Pld | W | D | L | GF | GA | GD | Pts | Qualification |
|---|---|---|---|---|---|---|---|---|---|---|---|
| 1 | 7 | Romania | 3 | 2 | 0 | 1 | 11 | 9 | +2 | 6 | Play-offs |
| 2 | 2 | North Macedonia | 3 | 1 | 1 | 1 | 11 | 16 | −5 | 4 | |
| 3 | 3 | Finland | 3 | 1 | 0 | 2 | 3 | 8 | −5 | 3 | |
| 4 | 4 | Belgium | 3 | 1 | 0 | 2 | 8 | 15 | −7 | 3 | |
| 5 | 5 | France | 3 | 1 | 0 | 2 | 8 | 17 | −9 | 3 | |
| 6 | 6 | Turkey | 3 | 1 | 0 | 2 | 8 | 18 | −10 | 3 | |
| 7 | 1 | Netherlands | 3 | 0 | 1 | 2 | 4 | 8 | −4 | 1 | |

Source: UEFA
Rules for classification: 1) points; 2) goal difference; 3) goals scored; 4) disciplinary points; 5) coefficient; 6) drawing of lots.

== Play-offs ==
The draw for the play-offs was held on 10 June 2015, 14:00 CEST (UTC+2), at the UEFA headquarters in Nyon, Switzerland. There were no seedings, with the only restriction that the best third-placed team (Romania) could not be drawn against the runner-up from the same main round group (Kazakhstan).

All times were CEST (UTC+2).

| Team 1 | Agg. | Team 2 | 1st leg | 2nd leg |
|---|---|---|---|---|
| Romania | 5–6 | Hungary | 2–2 | 3–4 (a.e.t.) |
| Bosnia and Herzegovina | 0–9 | Kazakhstan | 0–5 | 0–4 |
| Czech Republic | 3–2 | Belarus | 2–1 | 1–1 |
| Azerbaijan | 4–2 | Slovakia | 3–1 | 1–1 |

15 September 2015
18:00

| Romania | 2–2 | Hungary |
|---|---|---|
| Al-Ioani 21'; F. Matei 22' | Report | Gál 23'; Dróth 24' |

Romeo Iamandi, Buzău
Referee: Sebastian Stawicki (Poland), Tomasz Frak (Poland)
22 September 2015
20:00

| Hungary | 4–3 (a.e.t.) | Romania |
|---|---|---|
| Harnisch 4'; Hosszú 30'; Dróth 47', 50' | Report | F. Matei 16', 24' (pen.), 42' |

Főnix Hall, Debrecen
Referee: Fernando Gutiérrez Lumbreras (Spain), Francisco Diaz (Spain)

Hungary won 6–5 on aggregate and qualified for the final tournament.

15 September 2015
20:00

| Bosnia and Herzegovina | 0–5 | Kazakhstan |
|---|---|---|
| | Report | Nurgozhin 5'; Zhamankulov 15'; Douglas Jr. 25', 32'; Leo 39' |

Arena Zenica, Zenica
Referee: Pascal Lemal (Belgium), Gerd Bylois (Belgium)
22 September 2015
16:00

| Kazakhstan | 4–0 | Bosnia and Herzegovina |
|---|---|---|
| Leo 9'; Douglas Jr. 14'; Taku 24'; Yesenamanov 25' | Report |

Baluan Sholak Sports Palace, Almaty
Referee: Eduardo Fernandes Coelho (Portugal), Nuno Bogalho (Portugal)

Kazakhstan won 9–0 on aggregate and qualified for the final tournament.

15 September 2015
18:00

| Czech Republic | 2–1 | Belarus |
|---|---|---|
| Kovács 16'; Chernik 34' (o.g.) | Report | Chernik 26' |

Sports Hall AC Sparta Praha, Prague
Referee: Saša Tomić (Croatia), Danijel Janošević (Croatia)
22 September 2015
18:00

| Belarus | 1–1 | Czech Republic |
|---|---|---|
| Popov 40' | Report | Záruba 40' |

Minsk Sports Palace, Minsk
Referee: Alessandro Malfer (Italy), Angelo Galante (Italy)

Czech Republic won 3–2 on aggregate and qualified for the final tournament.

15 September 2015
18:00

| Azerbaijan | 3–1 | Slovakia |
|---|---|---|
| Amadeu 7'; Borisov 33'; Kozár 34' (o.g.) | Report | Brunovský 12' |

Baku Sports Hall, Baku
Referee: Admir Zahovič (Slovenia), Borut Šivic (Slovenia)
22 September 2015
19:00

| Slovakia | 1–1 | Azerbaijan |
|---|---|---|
| Rafaj 25' | Report | Borisov 8' |

Mestská Športová hala, Trnava
Referee: Timo Onatsu (Finland), Toni Lehtinen (Finland)

Azerbaijan won 4–2 on aggregate and qualified for the final tournament.

== Qualified teams ==
The following 12 teams qualified for the final tournament.

| Team | Qualified as | Qualified on | Previous appearances in tournament^{1} |
|---|---|---|---|
| Serbia | Hosts | 20 March 2012 | 4 (1999, 2007, 2010, 2012) |
| Russia | Main round Group 1 winners | 21 March 2015 | 9 (1996, **1999**, 2001, 2003, 2005, 2007, 2010, 2012, 2014) |
| Spain | Main round Group 2 winners | 21 March 2015 | 9 (**1996**, 1999, **2001**, 2003, **2005**, **2007**, **2010**, **2012**, 2014) |
| Italy | Main round Group 3 winners | 19 March 2015 | 9 (1996, 1999, 2001, **2003**, 2005, 2007, 2010, 2012, **2014**) |
| Ukraine | Main round Group 4 winners | 21 March 2015 | 8 (1996, 2001, 2003, 2005, 2007, 2010, 2012, 2014) |
| Slovenia | Main round Group 5 winners | 21 March 2015 | 4 (2003, 2010, 2012, 2014) |
| Croatia | Main round Group 6 winners | 21 March 2015 | 4 (1999, 2001, 2012, 2014) |
| Portugal | Main round Group 7 winners | 21 March 2015 | 7 (1999, 2003, 2005, 2007, 2010, 2012, 2014) |
| Hungary | Play-off winners | 22 September 2015 | 2 (2005, 2010) |
| Kazakhstan | Play-off winners | 22 September 2015 | 0 (debut) |
| Czech Republic | Play-off winners | 22 September 2015 | 7 (2001, 2003, 2005, 2007, 2010, 2012, 2014) |
| Azerbaijan | Play-off winners | 22 September 2015 | 3 (2010, 2012, 2014) |

^{1} Bold indicates champion for that year. Italic indicates host for that year.

== Goalscorers ==
8 goals

- (Ukraine) Mykola Bilotserkivets

7 goals

- (France) Réda Rabei

6 goals

- (Denmark) Mads Falck

5 goals

- (Croatia) Dario Marinović
- (Finland) Panu Autio
- (Finland) Mikko Kytölä
- (Georgia (country)) Archil Sebiskveradze
- (Latvia) Maksims Seņs
- (North Macedonia) Adrijan Micevski
- (Portugal) Ricardinho
- (Romania) Florin Matei
- (Slovakia) Tomáš Drahovský
- (Slovakia) Gabriel Rick
- (Slovenia) Igor Osredkar
- (Spain) Lin
- (Switzerland) Miguel Balvis Gonzalez

4 goals

- (Albania) Endrit Kaca
- (Armenia) Henrik Grigoryan
- (Croatia) Franko Jelovčić
- (Denmark) Kevin Jørgensen
- (France) Sid Belhaj
- (Hungary) Ákos Harnisch
- (Hungary) Ádám Hosszú
- (North Macedonia) Martin Todorovski
- (Moldova) Cristian Obadă
- (Sweden) Kristian Legiec

3 goals

- (Albania) Azem Brahimi
- (Albania) Mentor Mejzini
- (Andorra) Nacho Llamas
- (Armenia) Saro Mardanyan
- (Azerbaijan) Fineo de Araujo
- (Azerbaijan) Vitaliy Borisov
- (Belarus) Aleksandr Chernik
- (Belgium) Ahmed Sababti
- (Bosnia and Herzegovina) Tomo Bevanda
- (Bulgaria) Daniel Dimov
- (Croatia) Jakov Grcić
- (Czech Republic) Michal Belej
- (Czech Republic) Michal Kovács
- (Denmark) Mads Jensen
- (Estonia) Maksim Aleksejev
- (Georgia (country)) Giorgi Tikurishvili
- (Hungary) Zoltán Dróth
- (Italy) Gabriel Lima
- (Kazakhstan) Douglas Jr.
- (Kazakhstan) Nikolay Pengrin
- (Kazakhstan) Mikhail Pershin
- (Kazakhstan) Chingiz Yesenamanov
- (Lithuania) Arsenij Buinickij
- (Romania) László Szőcs
- (Slovenia) Alen Fetić
- (Slovenia) Gašper Vrhovec
- (Spain) Miguelín
- (Spain) Mario Rivillos
- (Sweden) Sargon Abraham
- (Sweden) Mathias Eteus
- (Sweden) Dan Mönell
- (Switzerland) Alessandro Facchinetti
- (Switzerland) Yves Mezger
- (Turkey) Cihan Özcan

2 goals

- (Albania) Erion Hoxha
- (Albania) Halim Selmanaj
- (Andorra) Carlos Barbosa
- (Armenia) Grigor Kapukranyan
- (Armenia) Andranik Karapetyan
- (Armenia) Davit Sujyan
- (Azerbaijan) Amadeu
- (Azerbaijan) Isa Atayev
- (Azerbaijan) Augusto
- (Azerbaijan) Ramiz Chovdarov
- (Azerbaijan) Eduardo
- (Bosnia and Herzegovina) Nijaz Mulahmetović
- (Bosnia and Herzegovina) Anel Radmilović
- (Bulgaria) Georgi Karageorgiev
- (Bulgaria) Plamen Stoykov
- (Croatia) Kristijan Grbeša
- (Croatia) Tihomir Novak
- (Czech Republic) Michal Seidler
- (Denmark) Morten Hauglund
- (Denmark) Jacob Jensen
- (Denmark) Louis Veis
- (England) Luke Ballinger
- (England) Stuart Cook
- (England) Ian Parkes
- (Estonia) Martin Taska
- (Estonia) Vladislav Tšurilkin
- (Finland) Jukka Kytölä
- (France) Adrien Gasmi
- (France) Abdessamad Mohammed
- (France) Alonso Ramirez
- (France) Alexandre Teixeira
- (Georgia (country)) Aleksandr Dzabiradze
- (Israel) Adam Cohen
- (Israel) Oz Sabag
- (Italy) Rodolfo Fortino
- (Italy) Daniel Giasson
- (Kazakhstan) Leo
- (Kazakhstan) Dauren Nurgozhin
- (Latvia) Andrejs Aleksejevs
- (Latvia) Igors Avanesovs
- (Latvia) Oskars Ikstēns
- (Latvia) Artūrs Jerofejevs
- (Latvia) Sergejs Nagibins
- (Latvia) Andrejs Šustrovs
- (Lithuania) Marius Bezykornovas
- (Lithuania) Jurij Jeremejev
- (Lithuania) Lukas Sendžikas
- (Moldova) Oleg Hilotii
- (Moldova) Sergiu Tacot
- (Montenegro) Bojan Bajović
- (Portugal) Pedro Cary
- (Romania) Emil Răducu
- (Romania) Dumitru Stoica
- (Russia) Sergei Abramov
- (Russia) Danil Kutuzov
- (Russia) Dmitri Lyskov
- (Slovakia) Anton Brunovský
- (Slovakia) Dušan Rafaj
- (Slovenia) Kristjan Čujec
- (Slovenia) Benjamin Melink
- (Slovenia) Rok Mordej
- (Spain) Alex
- (Spain) Raúl Campos
- (Spain) Pola
- (Sweden) Hanna Abraham
- (Sweden) Niklas Asp
- (Switzerland) Henry Acosta
- (Switzerland) Mato Sego
- (Turkey) Yasin Erdal
- (Ukraine) Yevhen Ivanyak
- (Ukraine) Denys Ovsyannikov
- (Ukraine) Dmytro Sorokin

1 goal

- (Albania) Roald Halimi
- (Andorra) Cabinho
- (Andorra) Jonathan Perez
- (Andorra) Marçal Raventós
- (Armenia) Armen Babayan
- (Armenia) Saro Galstyan
- (Armenia) Sargis Nasibyan
- (Azerbaijan) Rajab Farajzade
- (Azerbaijan) Rizvan Farzaliyev
- (Belarus) Yuri Aleinikov
- (Belarus) Aleksei Popov
- (Belgium) Sebastiano Canaris
- (Belgium) Karim Chaibai
- (Belgium) Mohamed Dahbi Reda
- (Belgium) Valentin Dujacquier
- (Belgium) Omar Rahou
- (Bosnia and Herzegovina) Mirko Hrkač
- (Bosnia and Herzegovina) Nermin Kahvedžić
- (Bosnia and Herzegovina) Dražen Novoselac
- (Bulgaria) Yosif Shutev
- (Croatia) Saša Babić
- (Croatia) Maro Djuraš
- (Croatia) Andrej Pandurević
- (Croatia) Josip Suton
- (Cyprus) Christos Iacovou
- (Czech Republic) Jiří Novotný
- (Czech Republic) Matěj Slováček
- (Czech Republic) Radim Záruba
- (Denmark) Jim Jensen
- (Denmark) Morten Larsen
- (Denmark) Rasmus Lucht
- (England) George Nash
- (England) Agon Rexha
- (Estonia) Kristjan Paapsi
- (Estonia) Pavel Rubel
- (Estonia) Aleksandr Starodub
- (Finland) Joni Pakola
- (France) Azdine Aigoun
- (France) Kamel Hamdoud
- (France) Mustapha Otmani
- (Georgia (country)) Giorgi Altunashvili
- (Georgia (country)) Vakhtangi Jvarashvili
- (Georgia (country)) Zurab Lukava
- (Georgia (country)) Kakhaber Maisaia
- (Georgia (country)) Roni
- (Georgia (country)) Nikoloz Zedelashvili
- (Gibraltar) Justin Collado
- (Gibraltar) Ivan Robba
- (Greece) Vasilis Asimakopoulos
- (Greece) Giannis Delaportas
- (Greece) Akis Iliadis
- (Greece) Antonios Manos
- (Greece) Sokratis Mourdoukoutas
- (Hungary) István Gál
- (Hungary) Tamás Lódi
- (Hungary) Péter Németh
- (Hungary) János Rábl
- (Hungary) János Trencsényi
- (Israel) Golan Kalimi
- (Israel) Idan Shkolnik
- (Israel) Eran Vana
- (Italy) Mauro Canal
- (Italy) Marco Ercolessi
- (Italy) Murilo Ferreira
- (Italy) Alessandro Patias
- (Kazakhstan) Konstantin Chebotarev
- (Kazakhstan) Higuita
- (Kazakhstan) Pavel Taku
- (Kazakhstan) Serik Zhamankulov
- (Latvia) Igors Dacko
- (Lithuania) Justinas Zagurskas
- (North Macedonia) Ivan Krstevski
- (North Macedonia) Zoran Leveski
- (Moldova) Oleg Gojan
- (Moldova) Andrian Laşcu
- (Moldova) Alexei Munteanu
- (Moldova) Leonid Podlesnov
- (Moldova) Alexandr Ţîmbalist
- (Montenegro) Marko Bajčetić
- (Montenegro) Milovan Drašković
- (Netherlands) Mohamed Attaibi
- (Netherlands) Jamal El Ghannouti
- (Norway) Stian Sortevik
- (Poland) Michał Kubik
- (Poland) Artur Popławski
- (Poland) Igor Sobalczyk
- (Poland) Sebastian Wojciechowski
- (Portugal) Tiago Brito
- (Portugal) Cardinal
- (Portugal) Bruno Coelho
- (Portugal) Djô
- (Portugal) Paulinho
- (Romania) Ion Al-Ioani
- (Romania) Csoma Alpar
- (Romania) Szabolcs Mánya
- (Romania) Marius Matei
- (Russia) Andrei Batyrev
- (Russia) Nikolai Pereverzev
- (Russia) Romulo
- (Russia) Sergei Sergeev
- (San Marino) Federico Macina
- (Scotland) Garry Hay
- (Scotland) Scott Lafferty
- (Slovakia) Marek Bahna
- (Slovakia) Juraj Višváder
- (Slovenia) Nejc Hozjan
- (Spain) Adri
- (Spain) Aicardo
- (Spain) Fernandão
- (Sweden) Patrik Burda
- (Sweden) Albert Hiseni
- (Sweden) Dida Rashidi
- (Switzerland) Xhemajl Likaj
- (Switzerland) Evangelos Marcoyannakis
- (Switzerland) Salvatore Patera
- (Switzerland) Yannick Raboud
- (Switzerland) Andri Rueegsegger
- (Switzerland) Fabio Santona
- (Turkey) Cem Keskin
- (Turkey) Kenan Köseoğlu
- (Turkey) Servet Yazgan
- (Ukraine) Dmytro Bondar
- (Ukraine) Roman Kordoba
- (Ukraine) Oleksandr Sorokin
- (Wales) Chris Hugh
- (Wales) Daniel Hooper
- (Wales) Elliot Thomas

Own goals

- (Belarus) Aleksandr Chernik (against Czech Republic)
- (Belarus) Aleksandr Gayduk (against Italy)
- (Bosnia and Herzegovina) Anel Radmilović (against Netherlands)
- (France) Adrien Gasmi (against Czech Republic)
- (Hungary) Gyula Tóth (against Switzerland)
- (Italy) Stefano Mammarella (against Poland)
- (Latvia) Oskars Ikstēns (against Netherlands)
- (North Macedonia) Ferid Agushi (against Hungary)
- (North Macedonia) Martin Todorovski (against Spain)
- (Netherlands) Mats Velseboer (against Latvia)
- (Scotland) James Yates (against Israel)
- (Slovakia) Peter Kozár (against Azerbaijan)
- (Turkey) Sami Büyüktopaç (against Croatia)
- (Ukraine) Serhiy Zhurba (against Azerbaijan)
- (Wales) Dean Maynard (against Montenegro)

Source: UEFA.com
