= UEFA Futsal Euro 2016 =

Европско првенство у футсалу 2016 Evropsko prvenstvo u futsalu 2016

Tournament details
- Host country: Serbia
- City: Belgrade
- Dates: 2–13 February
- Teams: 12 (from 1 confederation)
- Venue: 1 (in 1 host city)

Final positions
- Champions: Spain (7th title)
- Runners-up: Russia
- Third place: Kazakhstan
- Fourth place: Serbia

Tournament statistics
- Matches played: 20
- Goals scored: 129 (6.45 per match)
- Attendance: 113,961 (5,698 per match)
- Top scorer(s): (Kazakhstan) Serik Zhamankulov (Portugal) Ricardinho (Spain) Álex (Spain) Miguelín (Spain) Mario Rivillos (6 goals each)
- Best player: (Spain) Miguelín

The 2016 UEFA Futsal Championship, commonly referred to as UEFA Futsal Euro 2016, was the 10th edition of the UEFA Futsal Championship, the biennial international futsal championship organised by UEFA for the men's national teams of Europe. It was hosted for the first time in Serbia, following a decision of the UEFA Executive Committee on 20 March 2012. Serbia was chosen ahead of other bids from Bulgaria and Macedonia.

The final tournament was contested from 2 to 13 February 2016 by twelve teams, eleven of which joined the hosts Serbia after overcoming a qualifying tournament. The matches were played in the Belgrade Arena in the city of Belgrade.

== Qualification ==
A total of 46 UEFA nations entered the competition (including Scotland which entered for the first time), and with the hosts Serbia qualifying automatically, the other 45 teams competed in the qualifying competition to determine the remaining 11 spots in the final tournament. The qualifying competition, which took place from January to September 2015, consisted of three rounds:

- Preliminary round: The 24 lowest-ranked teams were drawn into six groups of four teams. Each group was played in single round-robin format at one of the pre-selected hosts. The six group winners and the best runner-up advanced to the main round.
- Main round: The 28 teams (21 highest-ranked teams and seven preliminary round qualifiers) were drawn into seven groups of four teams. Each group was played in single round-robin format at one of the pre-selected hosts. The seven group winners qualified directly to the final tournament, while the seven runners-up and the best third-placed team advanced to the play-offs.
- Play-offs: The eight teams were drawn into four ties to play home-and-away two-legged matches to determine the last four qualified teams.

=== Qualified teams ===
The following 12 teams qualified for the final tournament.

Team	Method of qualification	Finals appearance	Last appearance	Previous best performance
Serbia	Hosts	5th	2012	Quarter-finals (2010, 2012)
Russia	Main round Group 1 winners	10th	2014	Champions (1999)
Spain	Main round Group 2 winners	10th	2014	Champions (1996, 2001, 2005, 2007, 2010, 2012)
Italy	Main round Group 3 winners	10th	2014	Champions (2003, 2014)
Ukraine	Main round Group 4 winners	9th	2014	Runners-up (2001, 2003)
Slovenia	Main round Group 5 winners	5th	2014	Quarter-finals (2014)
Croatia	Main round Group 6 winners	5th	2014	Fourth place (2012)
Portugal	Main round Group 7 winners	8th	2014	Runners-up (2010)
Hungary	Play-off winners	3rd	2010	Group stage (2005, 2010)
Kazakhstan	Play-off winners	1st	—	Debut
Czech Republic	Play-off winners	8th	2014	Semi-finals (2003), Third place (2010)
Azerbaijan	Play-off winners	4th	2014	Fourth place (2010)

=== Final draw ===
The final draw was held on 2 October 2015, 12:00 CEST (UTC+2), at the Belgrade Town Hall in Belgrade, Serbia, where former Serbian footballer Dejan Stanković was unveiled as the tournament ambassador and made the draw. The 12 teams were drawn into four groups of three teams. The teams were seeded according to their coefficient ranking, with the hosts Serbia (assigned to position A1 in the draw) and the title holders Italy automatically placed into Pot 1.

Each group contained one team from Pot 1, one team from Pot 2, and one team from Pot 3. For political reasons, Russia and Ukraine could not be drawn in the same group or in groups scheduled to be played on the same day (due to a potential clash of teams and clash of fans). Therefore, if Russia were drawn in Group B, Ukraine had to be drawn in Group C or D, and if Russia were drawn in Group C or D, Ukraine had to be drawn in Group A or B.

Pot 1
Team	Coeff	Rank
Serbia (hosts)	4.528	8
Italy (holders)	8.278	2
Spain	8.410	1
Russia	8.167	3

Pot 2
Team	Coeff	Rank
Portugal	7.000	4
Ukraine	5.889	5
Croatia	4.667	6
Czech Republic	4.528	7

Pot 3
Team	Coeff	Rank
Slovenia	4.167	10
Azerbaijan	3.722	11
Hungary	2.667	12
Kazakhstan	1.667	19

== Venues ==
Location of the 2016 UEFA Futsal Euro final tournament host city in Serbia

All matches were played at the Kombank Arena. During the course of the championship, the arena was renamed from Kombank Arena to Belgrade Arena, for sponsorship reasons. Originally the Pionir Arena was proposed to host group stage matches.

Belgrade
Belgrade Arena
Capacity: 11,161
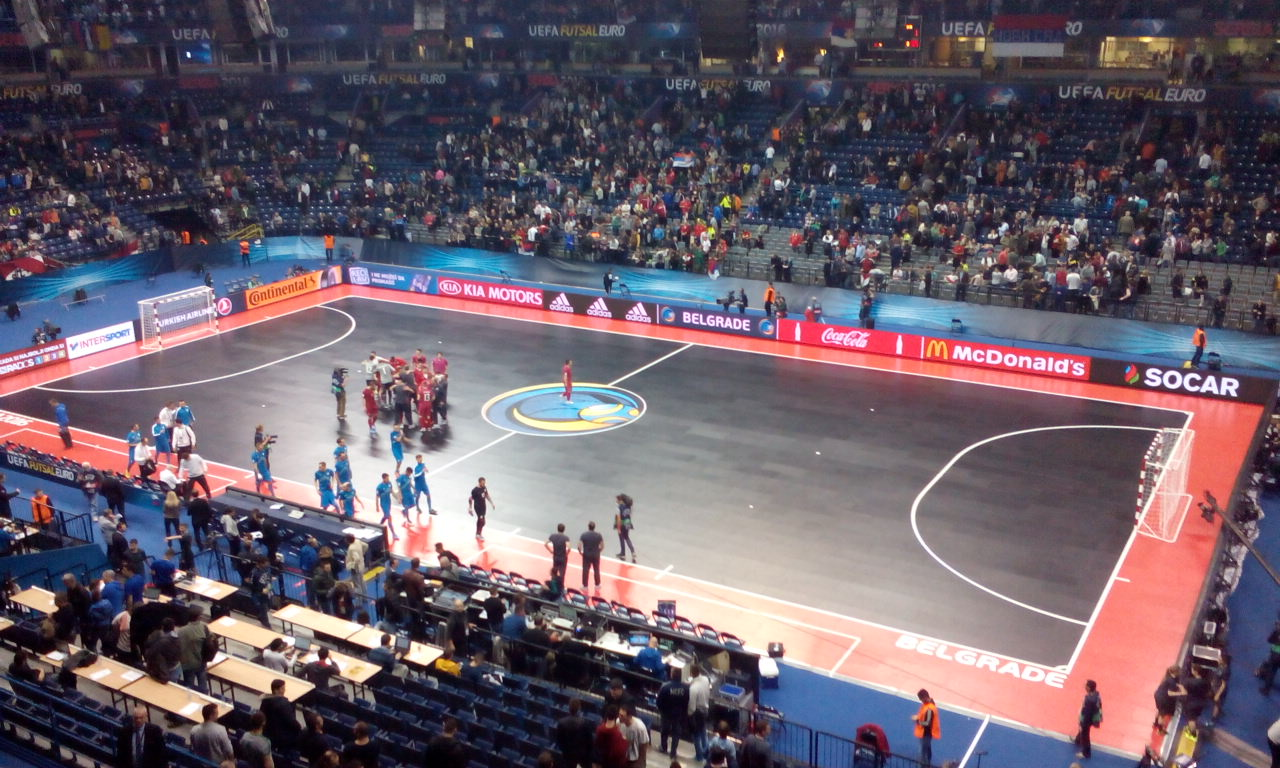

== Squads ==
Each national team have to submit a squad of 14 players, two of whom must be goalkeepers. If a player is injured or ill severely enough to prevent his participation in the tournament before his team's first match, he can be replaced by another player.

== Group stage ==
The schedule of the tournament was confirmed on 28 October 2015.

The group winners and runners-up advanced to the quarter-finals.

Tiebreakers

The teams were ranked according to points (3 points for a win, 1 point for a draw, 0 points for a loss). If two or more teams were equal on points on completion of the group matches, the following tie-breaking criteria were applied, in the order given, to determine the rankings:

1. Higher number of points obtained in the group matches played among the teams in question;
2. Superior goal difference resulting from the group matches played among the teams in question;
3. Higher number of goals scored in the group matches played among the teams in question;
4. If, after having applied criteria 1 to 3, teams still had an equal ranking, criteria 1 to 3 were reapplied exclusively to the group matches between the teams in question to determine their final rankings. If this procedure did not lead to a decision, criteria 5 to 9 applied;
5. Superior goal difference in all group matches;
6. Higher number of goals scored in all group matches;
7. If only two teams had the same number of points, and they were tied according to criteria 1 to 6 after having met in the last round of the group stage, their rankings were determined by a penalty shoot-out (not used if more than two teams had the same number of points, or if their rankings were not relevant for qualification for the next stage).
8. Lower disciplinary points total based only on yellow and red cards received in the group matches (red card = 3 points, yellow card = 1 point, expulsion for two yellow cards in one match = 3 points);
9. Drawing of lots.

All times were local, CET (UTC+1).

=== Group A ===
Pos	Team	Pld	W	D	L	GF	GA	GD	Pts	Qualification
1	Serbia (H)	2	2	0	0	8	2	+6	6	Knockout stage
2	Portugal	2	1	0	1	7	5	+2	3	Knockout stage
3	Slovenia	2	0	0	2	3	11	−8	0	

Source: UEFA
Rules for classification: Group stage tiebreakers
(H) Hosts
2 February 2016
18:30

Serbia	5–1	Slovenia
Janjić 14' (pen.); Kocić 21', 30'; Rajčević 27'; Pršić 34'	Report	Osredkar 3'

Belgrade Arena, Belgrade
Attendance: 11,161
Referee: Ondřej Černý (Czech Republic), Alessandro Malfer (Italy)

4 February 2016
18:30

Slovenia	2–6	Portugal
Čujec 3'; Vrhovec 20'	Report	Fábio Cecílio 5', 40'; Ricardinho 16', 24', 33'; Pedro Cary 31'

Belgrade Arena, Belgrade
Attendance: 2,270
Referee: Ivan Shabanov (Russia), Saša Tomić (Croatia)

6 February 2016
21:00

Portugal	1–3	Serbia
Ricardinho 15'	Report	Kocić 8'; Rajčević 37'; Simić 40'

Belgrade Arena, Belgrade
Attendance: 11,161
Referee: Fernando Gutiérrez Lumbreras (Spain), Pascal Lemal (Belgium)

=== Group B ===
Pos	Team	Pld	W	D	L	GF	GA	GD	Pts	Qualification
1	Spain	2	2	0	0	9	3	+6	6	Knockout stage
2	Ukraine	2	1	0	1	7	7	0	3	Knockout stage
3	Hungary	2	0	0	2	5	11	−6	0	

Source: UEFA
Rules for classification: Group stage tiebreakers
2 February 2016
21:00

Spain	5–2	Hungary
Németh 8' (o.g.); Bebe 15'; Miguelín 20', 29'; Andresito 36'	Report	Dróth 24', 38'

Belgrade Arena, Belgrade
Attendance: 5,100
Referee: Saša Tomić (Croatia), Bogdan Sorescu (Romania)

4 February 2016
21:00

Hungary	3–6	Ukraine
Dróth 8', 34'; Trencsényi 30'	Report	D. Sorokin 2'; Bondar 7', 35'; Ovsyannikov 25'; Myko. Grytsyna 30'; Valenko 36'

Belgrade Arena, Belgrade
Attendance: 2,445
Referee: Gerald Bauernfeind (Austria), Eduardo Fernandes Coelho (Portugal)

6 February 2016
18:30

Ukraine	1–4	Spain
Myko. Grytsyna 38'	Report	Álex 20', 34'; Rivillos 30', 40'

Belgrade Arena, Belgrade
Attendance: 9,850
Referee: Alessandro Malfer (Italy), Kamil Çetin (Turkey)

=== Group C ===
Pos	Team	Pld	W	D	L	GF	GA	GD	Pts	Qualification
1	Russia	2	1	1	0	4	3	+1	4	Knockout stage
2	Kazakhstan	2	1	0	1	5	4	+1	3	Knockout stage
3	Croatia	2	0	1	1	4	6	−2	1	

Source: UEFA
Rules for classification: Group stage tiebreakers
3 February 2016
18:30

Russia	2–1	Kazakhstan
Romulo 12', 12'	Report	Zhamankulov 13'

Belgrade Arena, Belgrade
Attendance: 2,115
Referee: Eduardo Fernandes Coelho (Portugal), Fernando Gutiérrez Lumbreras (Spain)

5 February 2016
18:30

Kazakhstan	4–2	Croatia
Douglas 6'; Suleimanov 7'; Zhamankulov 17', 27'	Report	Matošević 7'; Suton 33'

Belgrade Arena, Belgrade
Attendance: 1,555
Referee: Oleg Ivanov (Ukraine), Gábor Kovács (Hungary)

7 February 2016
18:30

Croatia	2–2	Russia
Robinho 9' (o.g.); Novak 25'	Report	Abramov 12'; Pereverzev 39'

Belgrade Arena, Belgrade
Attendance: 1,550
Referee: Cédric Pelissier (France), Admir Zahovič (Slovenia)

=== Group D ===
Pos	Team	Pld	W	D	L	GF	GA	GD	Pts	Qualification
1	Italy	2	2	0	0	10	0	+10	6	Knockout stage
2	Azerbaijan	2	1	0	1	6	8	−2	3	Knockout stage
3	Czech Republic	2	0	0	2	5	13	−8	0	

Source: UEFA
Rules for classification: Group stage tiebreakers
3 February 2016
21:00

Italy	3–0	Azerbaijan
Alex Merlim 20', 21'; Giasson 29'	Report

Belgrade Arena, Belgrade
Attendance: 2,200
Referee: Marc Birkett (England), Oleg Ivanov (Ukraine)

5 February 2016
21:00

Azerbaijan	6–5	Czech Republic
Farzaliyev 6'; Borisov 7'; De Araujo 12'; Eduardo 20'; Augusto 27'; Rafael 40'	Report	Záruba 10'; Holý 12'; Rešetár 16'; Novotný 24'; Kovács 31'

Belgrade Arena, Belgrade
Attendance: 1,756
Referee: Admir Zahovič (Slovenia), Gerald Bauernfeind (Austria)

7 February 2016
21:00

Czech Republic	0–7	Italy
	Report	Fortino 1', 22'; Gabriel Lima 11'; Alex Merlim 21'; Koudelka 22' (o.g.); Honorio 24'; Patias 33'

Belgrade Arena, Belgrade
Attendance: 1,020
Referee: Timo Onatsu (Finland), Ivan Shabanov (Russia)

== Knockout stage ==
If a match was drawn after 40 minutes of regular play, an extra time consisting of two five-minute periods would be played. If teams were still leveled after extra time, a penalty shoot-out would be used to determine the winner. In the third place match, the extra time would be skipped and the decision would go directly to kicks from the penalty mark.

=== Bracket ===
Quarter-finals
8 February – Belgrade
Serbia	2
Ukraine	1
9 February – Belgrade
Russia	6
Azerbaijan	2
8 February – Belgrade
Spain	6
Portugal	2
9 February – Belgrade
Italy	2
Kazakhstan	5

Semi-finals
11 February – Belgrade
Serbia	2
Russia (a.e.t.)	3
11 February – Belgrade
Spain	5
Kazakhstan	3

Final
13 February – Belgrade
Russia	3
Spain	7
Third place
13 February – Belgrade
Serbia	2
Kazakhstan	5

=== Quarter-finals ===
8 February 2016
18:30

Serbia	2–1	Ukraine
Kocić 2'; Simić 40'	Report	Myko. Grytsyna 24'

Belgrade Arena, Belgrade
Attendance: 11,161
Referee: Bogdan Sorescu (Romania), Marc Birkett (England)

8 February 2016
21:00

Portugal	2–6	Spain
Ricardinho 23', 26'	Report	Miguelín 13' (pen.); Rivillos 15', 40'; Álex 18', 35'; Raúl Campos 23'

Belgrade Arena, Belgrade
Attendance: 8,850
Referee: Gábor Kovács (Hungary), Ondřej Černý (Czech Republic)

9 February 2016
18:30

Russia	6–2	Azerbaijan
Abramov 7', 26'; Romulo 15'; Eder Lima 25', 39', 40'	Report	Augusto 8', 29'

Belgrade Arena, Belgrade
Attendance: 2,205
Referee: Pascal Lemal (Belgium), Timo Onatsu (Finland)

9 February 2016
21:00

Kazakhstan	5–2	Italy
Leo 16', 40'; Zhamankulov 19'; Yesenamanov 23'; Nurgozhin 37'	Report	Fortino 23'; Canal 37'

Belgrade Arena, Belgrade
Attendance: 1,740
Referee: Kamil Çetin (Turkey), Cédric Pelissier (France)

=== Semi-finals ===
11 February 2016
18:30

Serbia	2–3 (a.e.t.)	Russia
Kocić 26'; Simić 36'	Report	Eder Lima 13'; Abramov 33'; Romulo 44'

Belgrade Arena, Belgrade
Attendance: 11,161
Referee: Marc Birkett (England), Ondřej Černý (Czech Republic)

11 February 2016
21:00

Spain	5–3	Kazakhstan
Bebe 8'; Miguelín 17'; Raúl Campos 18', 39'; Álex 27'	Report	Dovgan 4'; Leo 36'; Zhamankulov 38'

Belgrade Arena, Belgrade
Attendance: 7,150
Referee: Saša Tomić (Croatia), Eduardo Fernandes Coelho (Portugal)

=== Third place match ===
13 February 2016
18:30

Serbia	2–5	Kazakhstan
Rakić 38'; Rajčević 40'	Report	Douglas 20', 30', 34'; Zhamankulov 21'; Higuita 32'

Belgrade Arena, Belgrade
Attendance: 11,161
Referee: Pascal Lemal (Belgium), Kamil Çetin (Turkey)

=== Final ===
13 February 2016
21:00

Russia	3–7	Spain
Romulo 20'; Robinho 32'; Milovanov 40'	Report	Álex 9'; Pola 16', 17'; Rivillos 17', 36'; Miguelín 31', 35'

Belgrade Arena, Belgrade
Attendance: 8,350
Referee: Alessandro Malfer (Italy), Bogdan Sorescu (Romania)

2016 UEFA Futsal Euro champions

Spain
7th title

== Tournament ranking ==
Per statistical convention in football, matches decided in extra time are counted as wins and losses, while matches decided by penalty shoot-out are counted as draws.

Pos	Team	Pld	W	D	L	GF	GA	GD	Pts	Final result
1	Spain	5	5	0	0	27	11	+16	15	Champions
2	Russia	5	3	1	1	16	14	+2	10	Runners-up
3	Kazakhstan	5	3	0	2	18	13	+5	9	Third place
4	Serbia	5	3	0	2	14	11	+3	9	Fourth place
5	Italy	3	2	0	1	12	5	+7	6	Eliminated in Quarter-finals
6	Ukraine	3	1	0	2	8	9	–1	3	Eliminated in Quarter-finals
7	Portugal	3	1	0	2	9	11	–2	3	Eliminated in Quarter-finals
8	Azerbaijan	3	1	0	2	8	14	–6	3	Eliminated in Quarter-finals
9	Croatia	2	0	1	1	4	6	–2	1	Eliminated in Group stage
10	Hungary	2	0	0	2	5	11	–6	0	Eliminated in Group stage
11	Czech Republic	2	0	0	2	5	13	–8	0	Eliminated in Group stage
12	Slovenia	2	0	0	2	3	11	–8	0	Eliminated in Group stage

== Goalscorers ==
6 goals

- (Kazakhstan) Serik Zhamankulov
- (Portugal) Ricardinho
- (Spain) Álex
- (Spain) Miguelín
- (Spain) Mario Rivillos

5 goals

- (Serbia) Mladen Kocić
- (Russia) Romulo

4 goals

- (Hungary) Zoltán Dróth
- (Kazakhstan) Douglas Júnior
- (Russia) Sergei Abramov
- (Russia) Eder Lima

3 goals

- (Azerbaijan) Augusto
- (Italy) Rodolfo Fortino
- (Italy) Alex Merlim
- (Kazakhstan) Leo Jaraguá
- (Serbia) Slobodan Rajčević
- (Serbia) Miloš Simić
- (Spain) Raúl Campos
- (Ukraine) Mykola Grytsyna

2 goals

- (Portugal) Fábio Cecílio
- (Spain) Bebe
- (Spain) Pola
- (Ukraine) Dmytro Bondar

1 goal

- (Azerbaijan) Vitaliy Borisov
- (Azerbaijan) Fineo De Araujo
- (Azerbaijan) Eduardo
- (Azerbaijan) Rizvan Farzaliyev
- (Azerbaijan) Rafael
- (Croatia) Vedran Matošević
- (Croatia) Tihomir Novak
- (Croatia) Josip Suton
- (Czech Republic) Michal Holý
- (Czech Republic) Michal Kovács
- (Czech Republic) Jiří Novotný
- (Czech Republic) Lukáš Rešetár
- (Czech Republic) Radim Záruba
- (Hungary) János Trencsényi
- (Italy) Mauro Canal
- (Italy) Daniel Giasson
- (Italy) Humberto Honorio
- (Italy) Gabriel Lima
- (Italy) Alessandro Patias
- (Kazakhstan) Aleksandr Dovgan
- (Kazakhstan) Leo Higuita
- (Kazakhstan) Dauren Nurgozhin
- (Kazakhstan) Dinmukhambet Suleimenov
- (Kazakhstan) Chingiz Yesenamanov
- (Portugal) Pedro Cary
- (Russia) Ivan Milovanov
- (Russia) Nikolai Pereverzev
- (Russia) Robinho
- (Serbia) Slobodan Janjić
- (Serbia) Marko Pršić
- (Serbia) Stefan Rakić
- (Slovenia) Kristjan Čujec
- (Slovenia) Igor Osredkar
- (Slovenia) Gašper Vrhovec
- (Spain) Andresito
- (Ukraine) Denys Ovsyannikov
- (Ukraine) Dmytro Sorokin
- (Ukraine) Yevgen Valenko

1 own goal

- (Czech Republic) Tomáš Koudelka (playing against Italy)
- (Hungary) Péter Németh (playing against Spain)
- (Russia) Robinho (playing against Croatia)

Source: UEFA.com

== Awards ==
- Golden Player: (Spain) Miguelín
- Golden Shoe: (Spain) Miguelín and Mario Rivillos, 6 goals, 4 assists (5 games)
- Silver Shoe: Álex (Spain) 6 goals, 2 assists (5 games)
- Bronze Shoe: (Portugal) Ricardinho 6 goals, 0 assists (3 games)
- All-star squad:
  - (Serbia) Miodrag Aksentijević (goalkeeper)
  - (Kazakhstan) Leo Higuita (goalkeeper)
  - (Spain) Paco Sedano (goalkeeper)
  - (Russia) Sergei Abramov
  - (Spain) Álex
  - (Kazakhstan) Douglas Júnior
  - (Serbia) Mladen Kocić
  - (Kazakhstan) Leo Jaraguá
  - (Italy) Gabriel Lima
  - (Spain) Miguelín
  - (Serbia) Marko Perić
  - (Portugal) Ricardinho
  - (Spain) Mario Rivillos
  - (Russia) Robinho

== Sponsorship ==
Global sponsors	National sponsors
Adidas; Carlsberg; Coca-Cola; Continental; Hisense; Kia; McDonald's; Mondo; SOCAR; Turkish Airlines	Intersport; Komercijalna banka; Radio S; Lav pivo

== Broadcasters ==
- Azerbaijan: CBC Sport
- Brazil: Globosat
- (Caribbean Community) Caribbean: ESPN
- Central America: ESPN
- (European Union) Europe: Eurosport
- Hungary: MTV
- Iran: Varzesh
- Kazakhstan: Kazakhstan Radio and Television Corporation
- Malaysia: Astro
- (Arab League) Middle East and North Africa: beIN Sports
- Mexico: ESPN Latin America
- Portugal: TVI
- Russia: Match TV
- Serbia: RTS
- (Union of South American Nations) South America: ESPN
- Spain: Mega (Spanish television channel) (Atresmedia)
- United States: ESPN (English) and ESPN Deportes (Spanish)
