= Csoma Alpar =

Romanian futsal player

Csoma
Personal information
- Full name: Alpar Csoma
- Date of birth: 22 March 1984 (age 42)
- Place of birth: Romania
- Position: Pivot

Team information
- Current team: City'us

International career
Years	Team	Apps	(Gls)
- Romania

Alpar Csoma (born 22 March 1984), is a Romanian futsal player who plays for City'us and the Romanian national futsal team.
