= Florin Matei =

Romanian futsal player

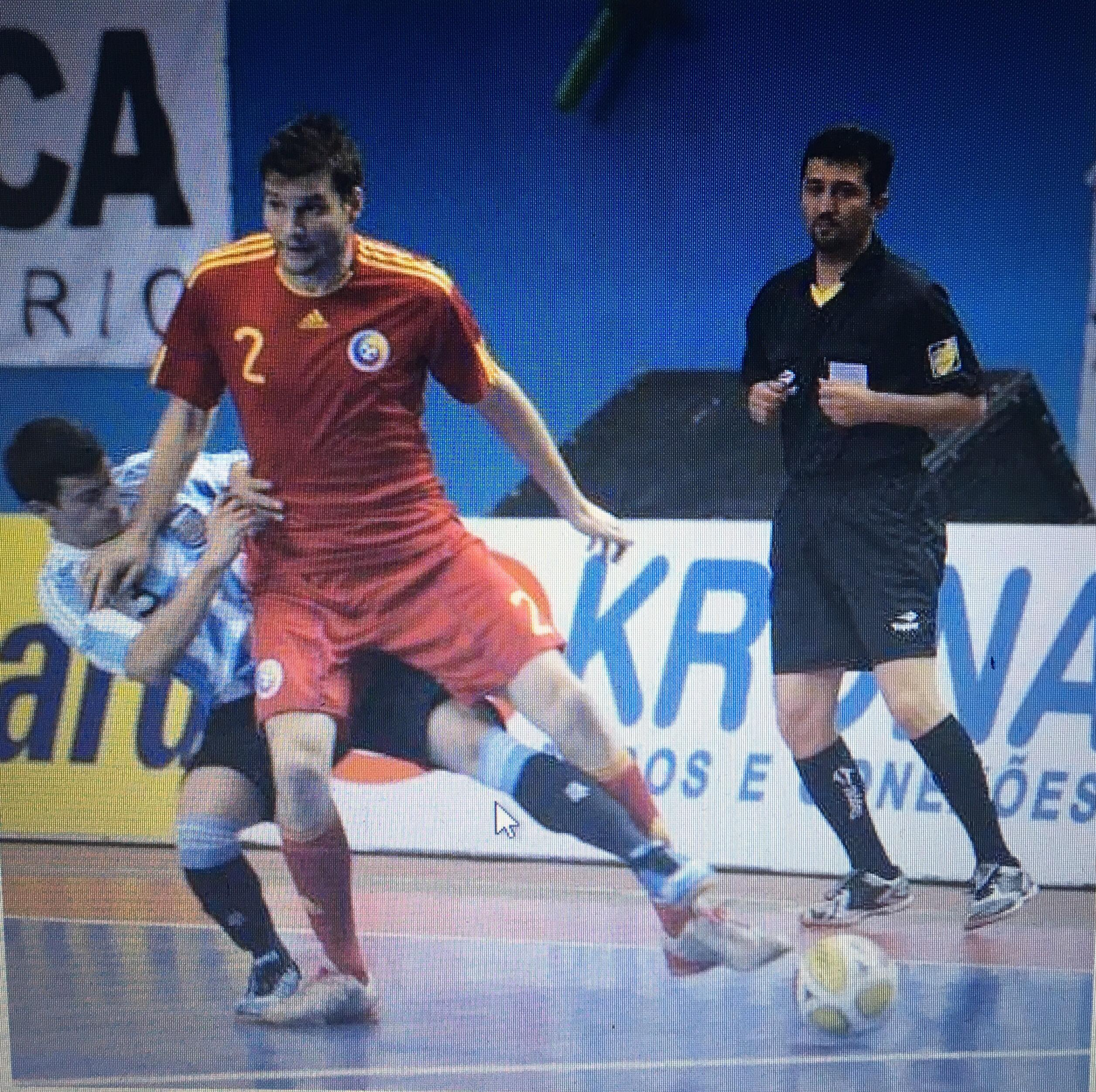

Personal information
- Full name: Robert Florin Matei
- Date of birth: 8 December 1983 (age 42)
- Place of birth: Bucharest, Romania
- Position: Ala

Team information
- Current team: FC Autobergamo Deva
- Number: 3

International career
Years	Team	Apps	(Gls)
- Romania

Robert Florin Matei (born 8 December 1983), is a Romanian futsal player who plays for Fc Autobergamo Deva and the Romanian national futsal team.
