= Dumitru Stoica =

Romanian futsal player

Stoica
Personal information
- Full name: Dumitru Mimi Stoica
- Date of birth: 30 September 1981 (age 45)
- Place of birth: Constanța (Romania)
- Position: Pivot

Team information
- Current team: City'us

International career
| Years | Team | Apps | (Gls) |
- Romania

Dumitru Stoica (born 30 September 1981) is a Romanian futsal player who plays for City'us and the Romanian national futsal team.
