= Ion Al-Ioani =

Romanian futsal player

Al-Ioani
Personal information
- Full name: Ion Al-Ioani
- Date of birth: 7 May 1983 (age 43)
- Place of birth: Targu Jiu, Romania
- Position: Ala

Team information
- Current team: C.S. Informatica Timişoara

International career
Years	Team	Apps	(Gls)
- Romania

Ion Al-Ioani (born 7 May 1983), is a Romanian futsal player who plays for Győri ETO Futsal Club and the Romanian national futsal team.
