= Kazakhstan national futsal team =

Kazakhstan
- Nickname(s): Қаршығалар (The Hawks)
- Association: Football Federation of Kazakhstan
- Confederation: UEFA (Europe)
- Head coach: (Brazil) Kaká
- Captain: Leo Higuita
- Most caps: Dinmukhambet Suleimenov
- Top scorer: Douglas Júnior
- Home stadium: Jekpe Jek
- FIFA code: KAZ
- FIFA ranking: 8 ▲1 (8 May 2026)
- Highest FIFA ranking: 5 (November 2024)
- Lowest FIFA ranking: 8 (May 2024)
Home colours	Away colours

First international
- Iran 14–2 Kazakhstan (Tehran, Iran; 1 May 1996)

Biggest win
- Kazakhstan 19–0 Singapore (Bangkok, Thailand; 8 May 2000)

Biggest defeat
- Iran 14–2 Kazakhstan (Tehran, Iran; 1 May 1996)

FIFA World Cup
- Appearances: 4 (First in 2000)
- Best result: Fourth place (2021)

AFC Futsal Asian Cup
- Appearances: 3 (First in 1999)
- Best result: (silver) 2nd place (2000)

UEFA Futsal Championship
- Appearances: 3 (First in 2016)
- Best result: (bronze) 3rd place (2016)

The Kazakhstan national futsal team is controlled by the Football Federation of Kazakhstan, the governing body for futsal in Kazakhstan and represents the country in international futsal competitions, such as the World Cup and the European Championships. They play their home games at the Jekpe Jek in Astana.

== Results and fixtures ==
The following is a list of match results in the last 12 months, as well as any future matches that have been scheduled.

Legend

Win Draw Lose Fixture

=== 2021 ===
12 September 2021 FIFA Futsal World Cup GS Group A	Kazakhstan	6–1	Costa Rica	Žalgiris Arena, Kaunas
18:00	Yessenamanov 10'; Tursagulov 11'; Douglas 14'; Taynan 17', 27'; Orazov 27'		Rodríguez 12'	Attendance: 950; Referee: Mohamed Hassan Ahmed Youssef (Egypt)

15 September 2021 FIFA Futsal World Cup GS Group A	Lithuania	0–3	Kazakhstan	Žalgiris Arena, Kaunas
20:00			Taynan 1'; Tursagulov 30'; Akbalikov 36'	Attendance: 2,032; Referee: Gábor Kovács (Hungary)

18 September 2021 FIFA Futsal World Cup GS Group A	Venezuela	1–1	Kazakhstan	Avia Solutions Group Arena, Vilnius
20:00	Vidal 40'		Douglas 5'	Attendance: 717; Referee: Aymen Kammoun (Tunisia)

23 September 2021 FIFA Futsal World Cup Round of 16	Kazakhstan	7–0	Thailand	Žalgiris Arena, Kaunas
20:00				Attendance: 464

27 September 2021 FIFA Futsal World Cup Quarter-finals	Iran	2–3	Kazakhstan	Žalgiris Arena, Kaunas
20:00				Attendance: 512; Referee: Ryan Shepheard (Australia)

30 September 2021 FIFA Futsal World Cup Semi-finals	Portugal	2–2 (a.e.t.) (4–3 p)	Kazakhstan	Žalgiris Arena, Kaunas
20:00				Attendance: 2,052; Referee: Nikola Jelić (Croatia)

3 October 2021 FIFA Futsal World Cup Third place match	Brazil	4–2	Kazakhstan	Žalgiris Arena, Kaunas
18:00				Referee: Valeria Palma (Chile)

- (in English) Official Kazakhstan Results – KFF.kz
- (in English) Official Kazakhstan Fixtures – KFF.kz

== Coaching staff ==
=== Current coaching staff ===
As of 29 August 2021

Name	Role
(Brazil) Paulo Ricardo Figueroa Silva (Kaká)	Head coach

=== Manager history ===
As of 29 August 2021

Name	Period	Matches	Wins	Draws	Losses	Winning %	Notes
(Brazil) Paulo Ricardo Figueroa Silva (Kaká)	20??–present	0	0	0	0	00.0%	

(If statistics are unavailable, display former coaches in bulleted list form)

== Team ==
=== Current squad ===
The following players were called up to the squad for the UEFA 2024 FIFA Futsal World Cup qualification matches against the Netherlands and Romania on 15 and 20 September 2023, respectively.

No.	Pos.	Player	Date of birth (age)	Caps	Club
1	GK	Nuralem Baidulla	24 November 1997 (age 28)		(Kazakhstan) MFC Atyrau
2	GK	Leo Higuita (captain)	6 June 1986 (age 40)		(Kazakhstan) AFC Kairat
16	GK	Narun Serikov	30 September 2001 (age 24)		(Kazakhstan) AFC Kairat
11	DF	Arnold Knaub	16 January 1995 (age 31)		(Kazakhstan) MFC Jetisu
14	DF	Douglas Júnior	15 October 1988 (age 37)		(Kazakhstan) AFC Kairat
15	DF	Zhakhangir Rashit	28 March 2000 (age 26)		(Kazakhstan) AFC Kairat
17	DF	Birzhan Orazov	17 October 1994 (age 31)		(Kazakhstan) AFC Kairat
20	DF	Abdirassil Abdumanapuly	20 December 2000 (age 25)		(Kazakhstan) MFC Ayat
3	FW	Taynan da Silva	12 February 1993 (age 33)		(Portugal) Sporting CP
6	FW	Edson Gomes	7 May 1992 (age 34)		(Kazakhstan) AFC Kairat
7	FW	Azat Valiullin	5 May 1992 (age 34)		(Kazakhstan) MFC Ayat
9	FW	Albert Akbalikov	5 January 1995 (age 31)		(Kazakhstan) AFC Kairat
10	FW	Chingiz Yesenamanov	10 March 1989 (age 37)		(Kazakhstan) FC Semey
12	FW	Dauren Tursagulov	16 January 1996 (age 30)		(Kazakhstan) AFC Kairat
13	FW	Raiymbek Zhuma	29 August 2001 (age 25)		(Kazakhstan) FC Semey
18	FW	Akzhol Daribay	26 July 1999 (age 27)		(Kazakhstan) FC Semey

=== Recent call-ups ===
The following players have also been called up to the squad within the last 12 months.

Pos.	Player	Date of birth (age)	Caps	Goals	Club	Latest call-up
DF	Zhaksylyk Amandossov	27 February 1993 (age 33)			(Kazakhstan) MFC Atyrau	v. Slovenia, 8 March 2023
DF	Nurabek Kabylbayev	27 August 1996 (age 30)			(Kazakhstan) MFC Rakhmet	v. Montenegro, 9 November 2022
DF	Leo Jaraguá	21 May 1987 (age 39)			(Brazil) JEC Krona Futsal	v. Montenegro, 12 October 2022
DF	Yevgeniy Koshkin	2 January 1992 (age 34)			(Kazakhstan) MFC Rakhmet	v. Montenegro, 12 October 2022
FW	Rinat Turegazin	2 July 1995 (age 31)			(Kazakhstan) FC Semey	v. Montenegro, 9 November 2022
FW	Batyrkhan Kenzhegali	14 November 2004 (age 21)			(Kazakhstan) MFC Rai	v. Montenegro, 9 November 2022
FW	Serik Mazhitov	26 November 1996 (age 29)			(Kazakhstan) MFC Rakhmet	v. Montenegro, 12 October 2022
^{COV} Player withdrew from the squad due to contracting COVID-19.^{INJ} Player withdrew from the squad due to an injury.^{PRE} Preliminary squad.^{RET} Retired from international futsal.

== Competitive record ==
=== All-time record ===
As of 16 September 2022

Tournament	Pld	W	D	L	GS	GA	Dif	Pts
FIFA World Cup	14	6	2	6	47	42	+5	20
FIFA World Cup Qualification	17	7	3	6	55	59	-4	24
European Championship	14	7	3	4	49	34	+15	25
European Championship Qualification	29	17	3	9	103	72	+31	54
Asian Championship	15	9	2	4	77	42	+35	29
Minor Tournament	10	4	3	3	33	36	-3	15
Friendly Match	16	12	4	1	52	27	+25	40
Total	104	56	16	32	375	289	+86	185

=== FIFA Futsal World Cup ===
FIFA Futsal World Cup record								Qualification record						
Year	Round	Pld	W	D	L	GF	GA	Outcome	Pld	W	D	L	GF	GA
(Netherlands) 1989	Part of Soviet Union							-	-	-	-	-	-	-
(Hong Kong) 1992	Did not enter							-	-	-	-	-	-	-
(Spain) 1996	Did not qualify							2nd of 3	4	2	0	2	20	27
(Guatemala) 2000	1st round	3	0	0	3	8	24	2nd of 9	5	3	1	1	36	16
(Taiwan) 2004	Did not qualify							Group 4 runner up	2	1	0	1	5	4
(Brazil) 2008	Did not qualify							Group 8 runner up	3	2	0	1	10	11
(Thailand) 2012	Did not qualify							Group 7 4th place	3	0	1	2	3	11
(Colombia) 2016	Round of 16	4	2	0	2	15	7	Play-offs	5	3	2	0	17	6
(Lithuania) 2021	Fourth place	7	4	2	1	24	11	Group D winner	6	5	0	1	23	10
(Uzbekistan) 2024	Quarter-finals	5	3	1	1	18	9	Group A winner	9	8	1	0	32	11
Total	4/10	19	9	3	7	65	51	7/9	37	24	5	8	146	96

=== UEFA European Futsal Championship ===
UEFA Futsal Euro record								Qualification record						
Year	Round	Pld	W	D	L	GF	GA	Outcome	Pld	W	D	L	GF	GA
(Spain) 1996	Not a member of UEFA							-	-	-	-	-	-	-
(Spain) 1999	Not a member of UEFA							-	-	-	-	-	-	-
(Russia) 2001	Candidate member of UEFA							-	-	-	-	-	-	-
(Italy) 2003	did not enter							-	-	-	-	-	-	-
(Czech Republic) 2005	did not qualify							Group A 3rd place	3	1	1	1	9	12
(Portugal) 2007	did not qualify							Group E 3rd place	6	4	0	2	36	20
(Hungary) 2010	did not qualify							Group 2 3rd place	6	3	1	2	18	16
(Croatia) 2012	did not qualify							Group 1 3rd place	3	1	0	2	5	11
(Belgium) 2014	did not qualify							Group 3 3rd place	3	1	1	1	4	6
(Serbia) 2016	Third Place	5	3	0	2	18	13	Play-offs	5	4	0	1	20	7
(Slovenia) 2018	Fourth Place	5	2	2	1	14	9	Group 6 winners	3	3	0	0	11	0
(Netherlands) 2022	Quarterfinals	4	2	1	1	17	12	Group 5 winners	6	6	0	0	30	5
(Latvia) (Lithuania) (Slovenia) 2026	did not qualify							Play-offs	8	4	1	3	25	20
Total	3/13	14	7	3	4	49	34	8/13	43	27	4	12	158	97

=== AFC Futsal Asian Cup ===
AFC Futsal Asian Cup record
Year	Round	Pld	W	D*	L	GS	GA
Malaysia 1999	Third Place	5	3	0	2	17	18
Thailand 2000	Runners-up	5	3	1	1	36	16
Iran 2001	Quarterfinals	5	3	1	1	24	8
Total	3/3	15	9	2	4	77	42

=== Minor Tournament ===
this table consist of only senior A team Results (not include Youth and club match results)

Four/Three Nations Cup record
Year	Round	Pld	W	D	L	GS	GA	Dif	Pts
(Georgia (country)) 2002 Tbilisi Cup	Fourth place	2	0	0	2	3	20	-17	0
(Azerbaijan) 2008 Baku Cup	Runners-up	2	1	0	1	6	5	+1	3
(Uzbekistan) 2014 Tashkent Cup	Champions	3	2	1	0	9	5	+4	7
2016 Thailand Cup	Champions	3	1	2	0	15	6	+9	5
2017 Thailand Cup	Runners-up	3	2	1	0	6	3	+3	7
Total	5/5	13	6	4	3	39	39	0	22

==== 2017 Thailand Fives Ranking ====
Pos	Team	Pld	W	D	L	GF	GA	GD	Pts	Final result
1	Argentina	3	2	1	0	11	2	+9	7	Champions
2	Kazakhstan	3	2	1	0	6	3	+3	7	Runners-up
3	Thailand (H)	3	1	0	2	8	7	+1	3	Third place
4	Mozambique	3	0	0	3	6	19	−13	0	Fourth place

(H) Hosts

==== 2016 Thailand Fives Ranking ====
Pos	Team	Pld	W	D	L	GF	GA	GD	Pts	Final result
1	Kazakhstan	3	1	2	0	15	6	+9	5	Champions
2	Thailand (H)	3	1	2	0	12	10	+2	5	Runners-up
3	Iran	3	1	1	1	12	12	0	4	Third place
4	Japan	3	0	1	2	4	15	−11	1	Fourth place

(H) Hosts

==== 2014 Tashkent Cup Ranking ====
Pos	Team	Pld	W	D	L	GF	GA	GD	Pts	Final result
1	Kazakhstan	3	2	1	0	9	5	+4	7	Champions
2	Azerbaijan	3	2	0	1	8	8	0	6	Runners-up
3	Uzbekistan (H)	3	0	2	1	5	8	−3	2	Third place
4	Belarus	3	0	1	2	5	6	−1	1	Fourth place

(H) Hosts

== Head-to-head record ==
As of 13 April 2025

Opponents	Conf.	Played	Won	Drawn*	Lost	GF	GA	GD
Japan	AFC	5	2	2	1	23	14	+9
Iran	AFC	1	1	1	5	15	34	-19
Uzbekistan	AFC	11	8	2	1	39	21	+19
Argentina	CONMEBOL	3	0	1	1	0	1	-1
Poland	UEFA	2	1	1	0	8	1	+7
Serbia	UEFA	1	1	0	0	5	2	+3
North Macedonia	UEFA	1	1	0	0	3	0	+3
Denmark	UEFA	1	1	0	0	5	0	+5
Spain	UEFA	6	0	2	4	11	28	-17
Italy	UEFA	3	2	0	1	9	10	-1
Croatia	UEFA	4	2	1	1	7	8	-1
Russia	UEFA	9	0	4	5	12	25	-13
France	UEFA	2	2	0	0	6	2	+4
Slovenia	UEFA	1	0	1	0	2	2	0
Czech Republic	UEFA	4	3	0	1	15	9	+6
Bosnia and Herzegovina	UEFA	3	3	0	0	17	5	+12
Georgia	UEFA	6	5	0	1	17	11	+6
Portugal	UEFA	4	2	1	1	9	10	–1
Romania	UEFA	6	2	1	3	15	20	-5
Belarus	UEFA	6	4	1	1	19	8	+11
Azerbaijan	UEFA	10	6	1	3	38	41	-3
Latvia	UEFA	2	1	1	0	4	2	+2
China	AFC	2	1	0	1	8	7	+1
Hungary	UEFA	3	2	0	1	12	6	+6
Ukraine	UEFA	5	0	2	3	7	12	-5
Moldova	UEFA	1	0	1	0	1	1	0
Slovakia	UEFA	1	0	0	1	4	6	-2
Ireland	UEFA	1	1	0	0	5	0	+5
Cyprus	UEFA	3	3	0	0	17	6	+11
England	UEFA	1	1	0	0	5	2	+3
Libya	CAF	1	1	0	0	4	1	+3
Andorra	UEFA	2	2	0	0	6	2	+4
Kyrgyzstan	AFC	2	2	0	0	8	3	+5
Malta	UEFA	1	1	0	0	13	0	+13
Armenia	UEFA	1	0	1	0	2	2	0
Bulgaria	UEFA	1	1	0	0	6	5	+1
Tajikistan	AFC	3	3	0	0	26	8	+22
Malaysia	AFC	2	2	0	0	12	4	+8
Kuwait	AFC	1	1	0	0	4	0	+4
Guatemala	CONCACAF	1	0	0	1	5	6	-1
Brazil	CONMEBOL	2	0	0	2	3	16	-13
Singapore	AFC	1	1	0	0	19	0	+19
New Zealand	OFC	1	1	0	0	10	0	+10
Thailand	AFC	4	3	1	0	16	7	+9
South Korea	AFC	2	0	1	1	6	11	-5
Vietnam	AFC	2	0	1	1	3	6	-3
Total		111	60	18	33	395	291	+104
