= Emil Răducu =

Romanian futsal player

Personal information
- Full name: Emil Răducu
- Date of birth: 19 May 1984 (age 42)
- Place of birth: Bucharest, Romania
- Position: Defender

Senior career*
Years	Team	Apps	(Gls)
2011–	Andorra		
–	Balzan		

International career
- Romania
- * Club domestic league appearances and goals

Emil Andrei Răducu (born 19 May 1984), is a Romanian futsal player who plays for Balzan as a Defender.

In the 2018 play-off final second leg, Raducu equalized the score and led the match to penalties, where Luxol ultimately lost 2–3.
