= Réda Rabeï =

French footballer (born 1994)

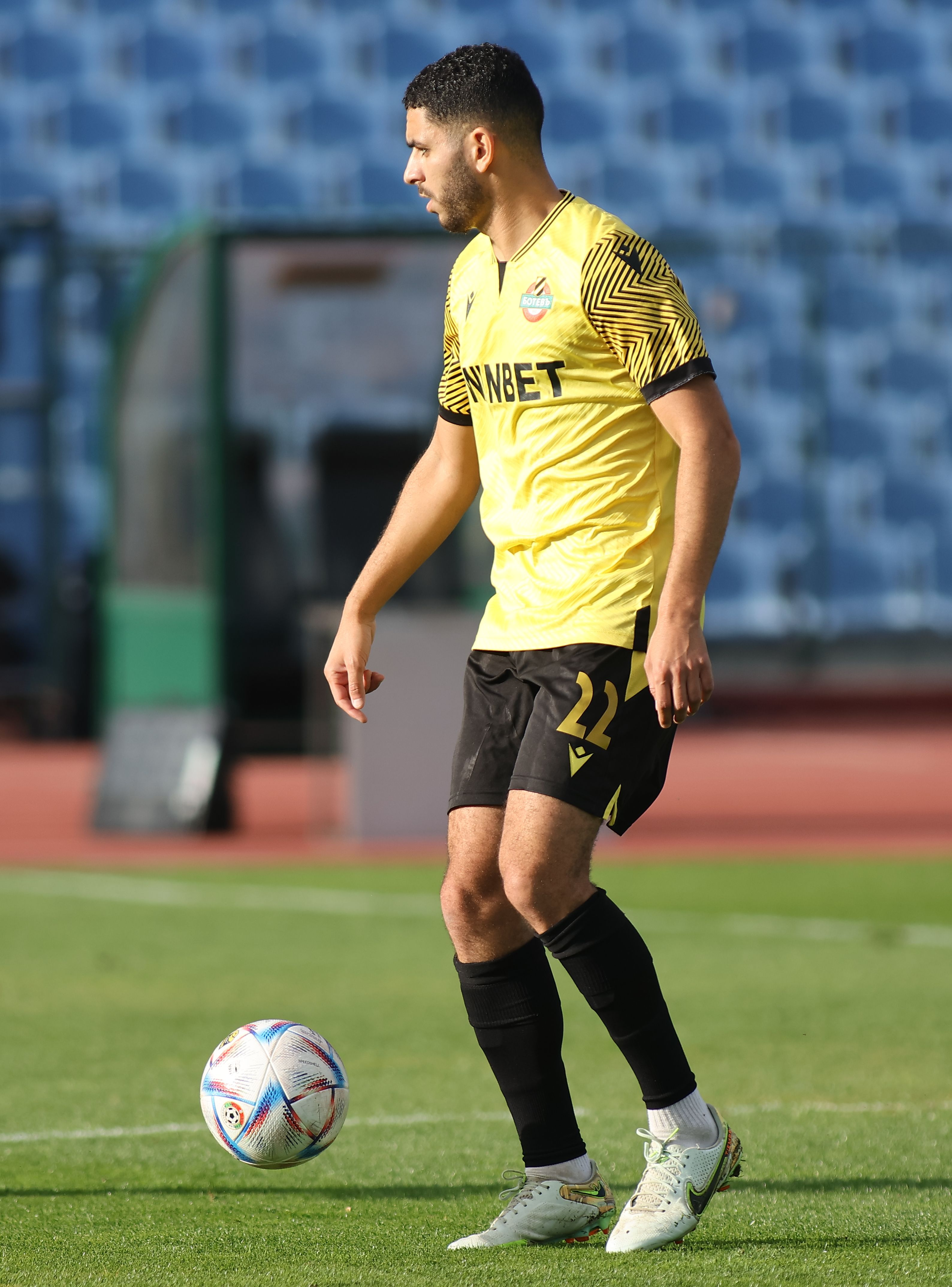

Personal information
- Date of birth: 12 July 1994 (age 32)
- Place of birth: Roubaix, France
- Height: 1.80 m (5 ft 11 in)
- Position: Midfielder

Team information
- Current team: Pays de Cassel

Youth career
- 2006–2009: Lille
- 2009–2011: Roubaix FC (futsal)
- 2011–2012: Picasso FC (futsal)
- 2012–2014: Roubaix FC (futsal)

Senior career*
Years	Team	Apps	(Gls)
2014–2016	Douai Gayant (futsal)		(35)
2016	Wasquehal	10	(8)
2016–2019	Amiens	1	(0)
2016–2019	Amiens II	20	(2)
2017	→ Lyon-Duchère (loan)	4	(0)
2018	→ Juventus București (loan)	7	(0)
2018–2019	→ Avranches (loan)	17	(4)
2019–2020	Fremad Amager	37	(9)
2021–2023	Botev Plovdiv	66	(3)
2023	→ Fakel Voronezh (loan)	10	(1)
2024–	Pays de Cassel	10	(3)

International career
2013–2015	France Futsal	24	(18)
- * Club domestic league appearances and goals as of 7 December 2024

Réda Rabeï (born 12 July 1994) is a French professional footballer who plays as a midfielder for Championnat National 3 club Pays de Cassel. He was a professional futsal player and France Futsal international, where he played as a goalkeeper, before switching to football.

== Club career ==
In the 2014–2015 season, Rabeï scored 34 goals and was top scorer for Douai Gayant in the Championnat de France de Futsal. Rabeï switched to football, and transferred to Wasquehal in 2016 wherein he scored 8 goals in 10 games. He then transferred to Ligue 2 with Amiens for the 2016–17 season.

On 24 June 2019, Rabeï joined Danish 1st Division club Fremad Amager.

On 3 February 2023, Rabeï moved on loan to Fakel Voronezh in the Russian Premier League.

== International career ==
Rabeï played for the France national Futsal team.

== Personal life ==
Rabeï was born in France, and is of Algerian descent.
