= Dinmukhambet Suleimenov =

Kazakhstani futsal player

Personal information
- Full name: Dinmukhambet Salmukhambetovich Suleimenov
- Date of birth: 25 August 1981 (age 45)
- Place of birth: Kentau, Kazakhstan
- Height: 1.70 m (5 ft 7 in)
- Position: Defender

Team information
- Current team: MFC Zhetysu
- Number: 8

Senior career*
Years	Team	Apps	(Gls)
1999–2001	Aktau		
2001–2002	Abylaikhan		
2002–2006	KazTransOil		
2006–2007	Alem		
2007–2009	Aktoberentgen		
2009–2019	AFC Kairat		
2019–	MFC Zhetysu		

International career
2001-	Kazakhstan		
- * Club domestic league appearances and goals

Dinmukhambet Salmukhambetovich Suleimenov (born 8 January 1981) is a Kazakh futsal player who plays as a defender for MFC Zhetysu and the Kazakhstan national futsal team.

Before joining MFC Zhetysu, Suleimenov played for AFC Kairat for ten seasons winning ten Kazakhstani Futsal Championships and two UEFA Futsal Cups with the club.
