= Yevhen Ivanyak =

Ukrainian footballer (born 1982)

Ivanyak
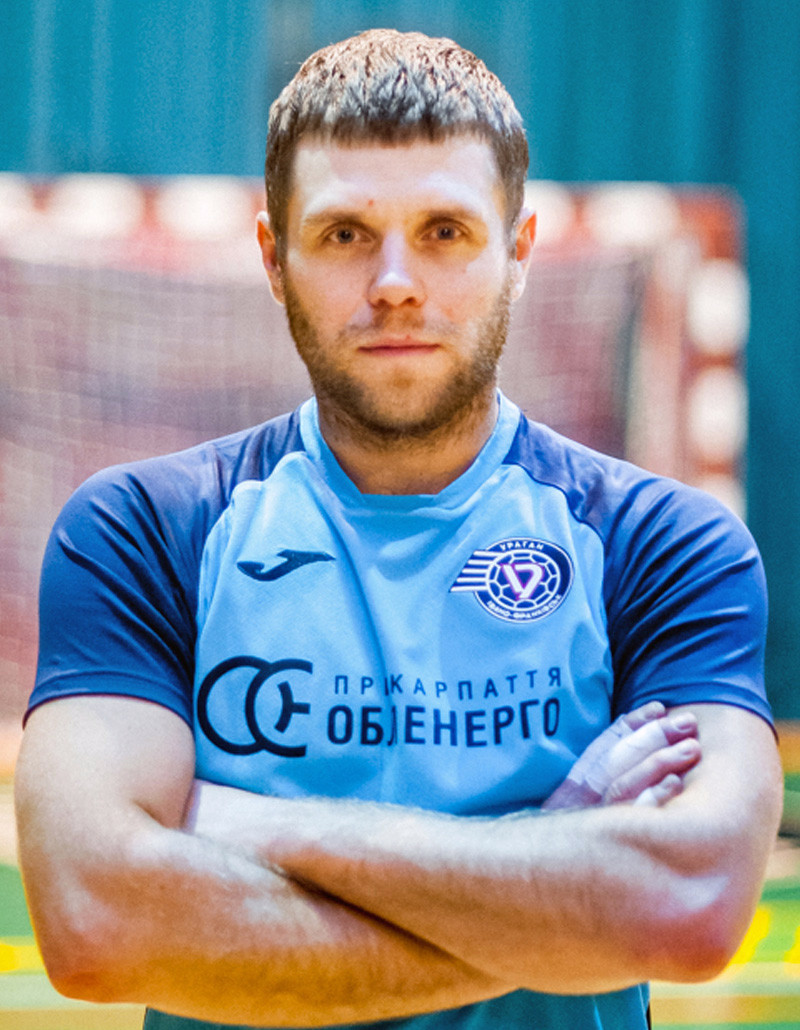

Personal information
- Full name: Yevhen Ivanyak
- Date of birth: 28 September 1982 (age 44)
- Place of birth: Soviet Union
- Position: Goalkeeper

Team information
- Current team: Lokomotiv Kharkiv

Senior career*
Years	Team	Apps	(Gls)
- Time Lviv
- Lokomotiv Kharkiv

International career
- Ukraine
- * Club domestic league appearances and goals

Yevhen Ivanyak (born 28 September 1982), is a Ukrainian futsal player who plays for Lokomotiv Kharkiv and the Ukraine national futsal team.
