= Leo Santana =

Brazilian futsal player

Personal information
- Full name: Leonardo Santana da Silva
- Date of birth: 27 March 1988 (age 38)
- Place of birth: Juiz de Fora, Brazil
- Height: 1.70 m (5 ft 7 in)
- Positions: Defender; winger

Team information
- Current team: Murcia
- Number: 27

Youth career
- Sport Club JF

Senior career*
| Years | Team | Apps | (Gls) |
| –2008 | Sport Club JF | | |
| 2008 | São Bernardo | | |
| 2009 | AABB - JF | | |
| 2009–2010 | Praia Clube | | |
| 2010–2013 | Kairat Almaty | | |
| 2014–2017 | Sibiryak | | |
| 2017– | Barcelona | | |

International career
| 2018– | Brazil | | |
- * Club domestic league appearances and goals as of 00:00, 8 March 2019 (UTC)

Leonardo Santana da Silva (born 27 March 1988), commonly known as Leo Santana, is a Brazilian futsal player who plays as a defender for Barcelona and the Brazilian national futsal team.
