= Szabolcs Mánya =

Romanian futsal player

Mánya
Personal information
- Full name: Szabolcs Mánya
- Date of birth: 30 January 1989 (age 37)
- Place of birth: Romania
- Height: 1.76 m (5 ft 9 in)
- Position: Winger

Team information
- Current team: Futsal Klub Odorheiu Secuiesc
- Number: 5

Youth career
- Sepsi Futsal "SPICOM" Sfântu Gheorghe

Senior career*
Years	Team	Apps	(Gls)
- Sepsi Futsal "SPICOM" Sfântu Gheorghe
- Sportklub Odorheiu Secuiesc

International career
	Romania		(10)
- * Club domestic league appearances and goals

Szabolcs Mánya (born 30 January 1989), is a Romanian futsal player who plays for Odorheiu Secuiesc and the Romanian national futsal team.
