= Daniel Giasson =

Brazilian-born Italian futsal player

Giasson
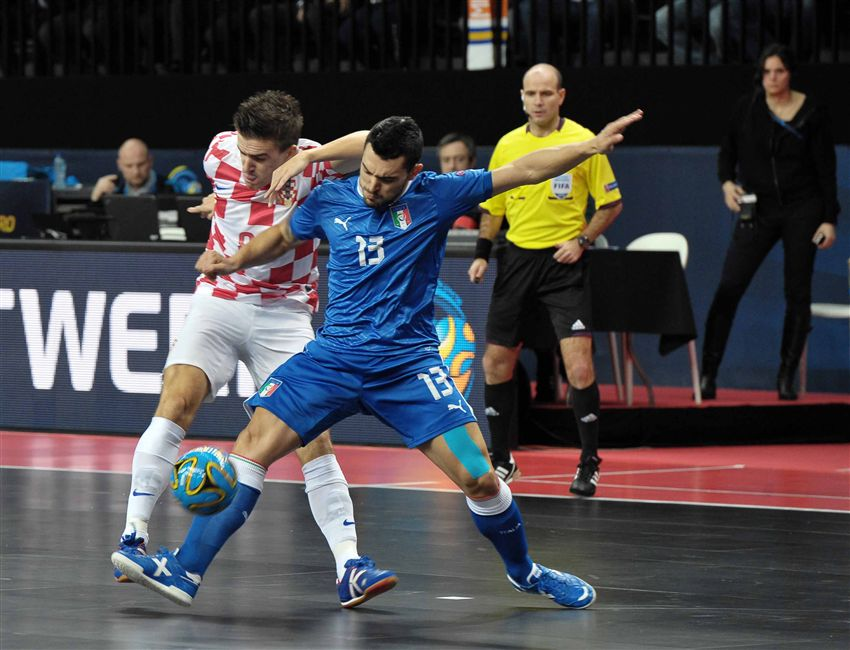

Personal information
- Full name: Daniel Giasson
- Date of birth: 24 August 1987 (age 39)
- Place of birth: Caxias do Sul, Brazil
- Height: 1.75 m (5 ft 9 in)
- Position: Winger

Team information
- Current team: Jaén
- Number: 13

Senior career*
Years	Team	Apps	(Gls)
2005–2007	Nepi		
2007–2008	Lazio		
2008–2009	Torrino		
2009–2010	Ceccano		
2010–2011	Lazio		
2011–2012	Real Rieti		
2012–2013	C. Genzano		
2013–2014	Pescara		
2014–	Luparense		

International career
2009–	Italy	30	(6)
- * Club domestic league appearances and goals

Daniel Giasson (born 24 August 1987), is a Brazilian born, Italian futsal player who plays for Jaén and the Italian national futsal team.
