= Chingiz Yesenamanov =

Kazakhstani futsal player

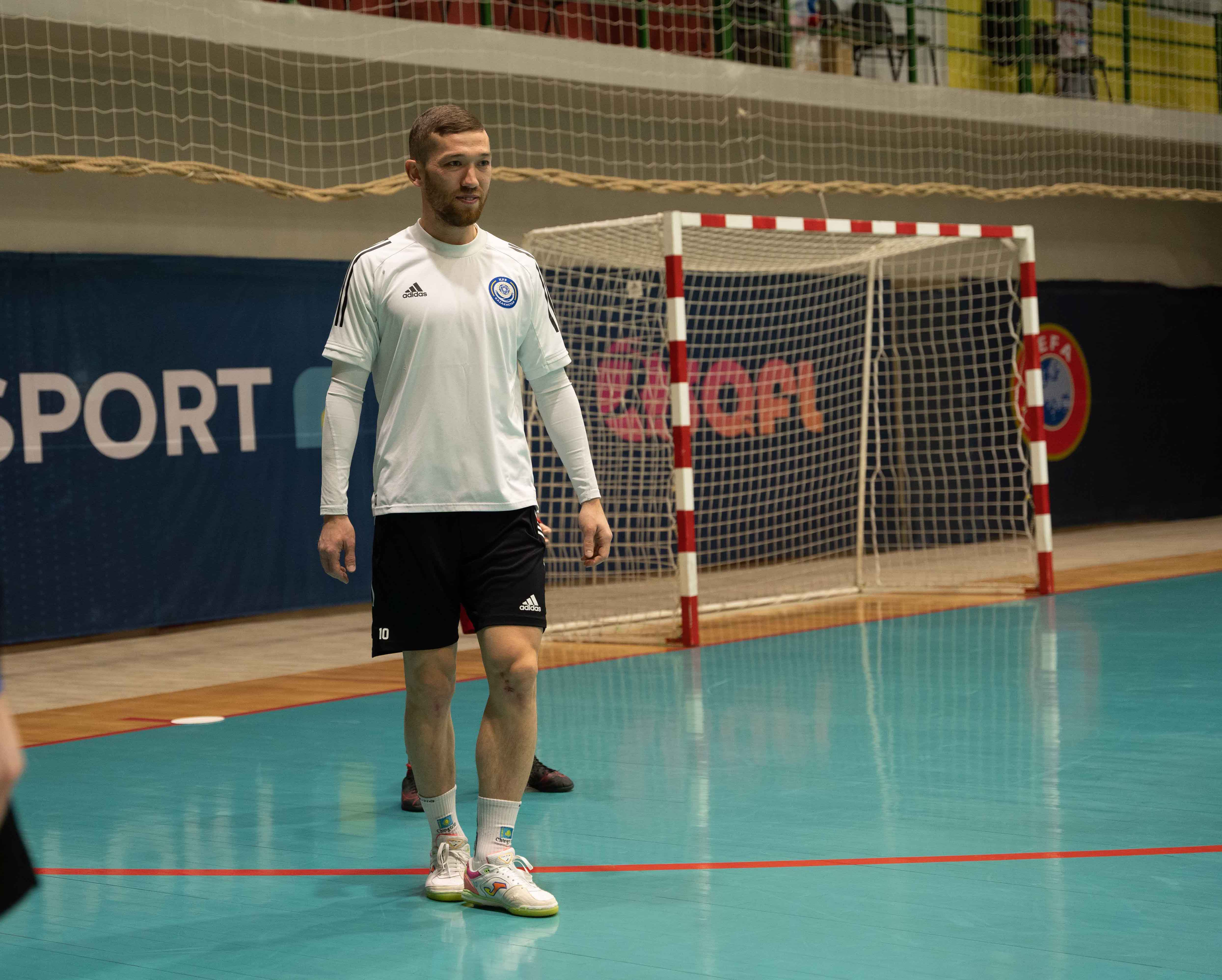

Personal information
- Full name: Chingiz Sembaiuly Yesenamanov
- Date of birth: 10 March 1989 (age 37)
- Place of birth: Karaganda, Kazakhstan
- Height: 1.66 m (5 ft 5 in)
- Position: Universal

Team information
- Current team: AFC Kairat
- Number: 18

Senior career*
Years	Team	Apps	(Gls)
2008–2015	MFC Tulpar		
2015–	AFC Kairat		

International career
2009–	Kazakhstan		
- * Club domestic league appearances and goals

Chingiz Sembaiuly Yesenamanov (Kazakh: Шыңғыс Сембайұлы Есенаманов; born 10 March 1989) is a Kazakhstani futsal player who is a universal player for AFC Kairat and the Kazakhstan national futsal team.
