= Dmytro Sorokin =

Ukrainian futsal player

Sorokin
Personal information
- Full name: Dmytro Sorokin
- Date of birth: 14 July 1988 (age 38)
- Place of birth: Soviet Union
- Position: Winger

Team information
- Current team: Prodexim Kherson

Senior career*
Years	Team	Apps	(Gls)
- Lokomotiv Kharkiv

International career
- Ukraine
- * Club domestic league appearances and goals

Dmytro Sorokin (born 14 July 1988), is a Ukrainian futsal player who played for Prodexim Kherson and the Ukraine national futsal team.
