= Vitaliy Borisov =

Azerbaijani futsal player

Borisov
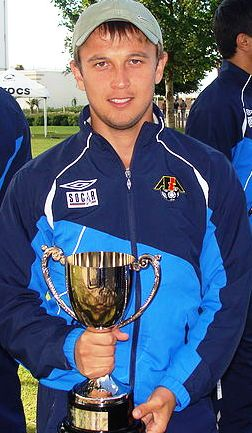

Personal information
- Full name: Vitaliy Borisov
- Date of birth: 5 July 1982 (age 44)
- Place of birth: Baku, Azerbaijan, Soviet Union
- Position: Ala

Team information
- Current team: Araz Naxçivan

Senior career*
Years	Team	Apps	(Gls)
2000	Angloyl	16	(6)
2000—2002	Tribute		
2003—2004	Adliyya Baku		
2004	Araz Naxçivan		
2004—2005	Asfarma		
2005—2008	Araz Naxçivan		
2008—2009	Dina		
2009—2016	Araz Naxçivan		
2016–2018	KMF Ekonomac		

International career
- Azerbaijan

Managerial career
- 2023-2024: Araz Naxçivan
- 2024-: Azerbaijan
- * Club domestic league appearances and goals

Vitaliy Borisov (born 5 July 1982) is a sport coach and a former Azerbaijani futsal player who played for the Azerbaijan national futsal team.

== Career ==
=== Coaching ===
From 2021 to 2022, he worked as an assistant coach at the Neftçi Sports Club.

On June 5, 2023, Borisov was appointed as the head coach of the Araz Naxçivan futsal club. On June 16, he was also appointed as the head coach of the Azerbaijan national futsal team.
