= Edu (futsal player) =

Azerbaijani futsal player (born 1986)

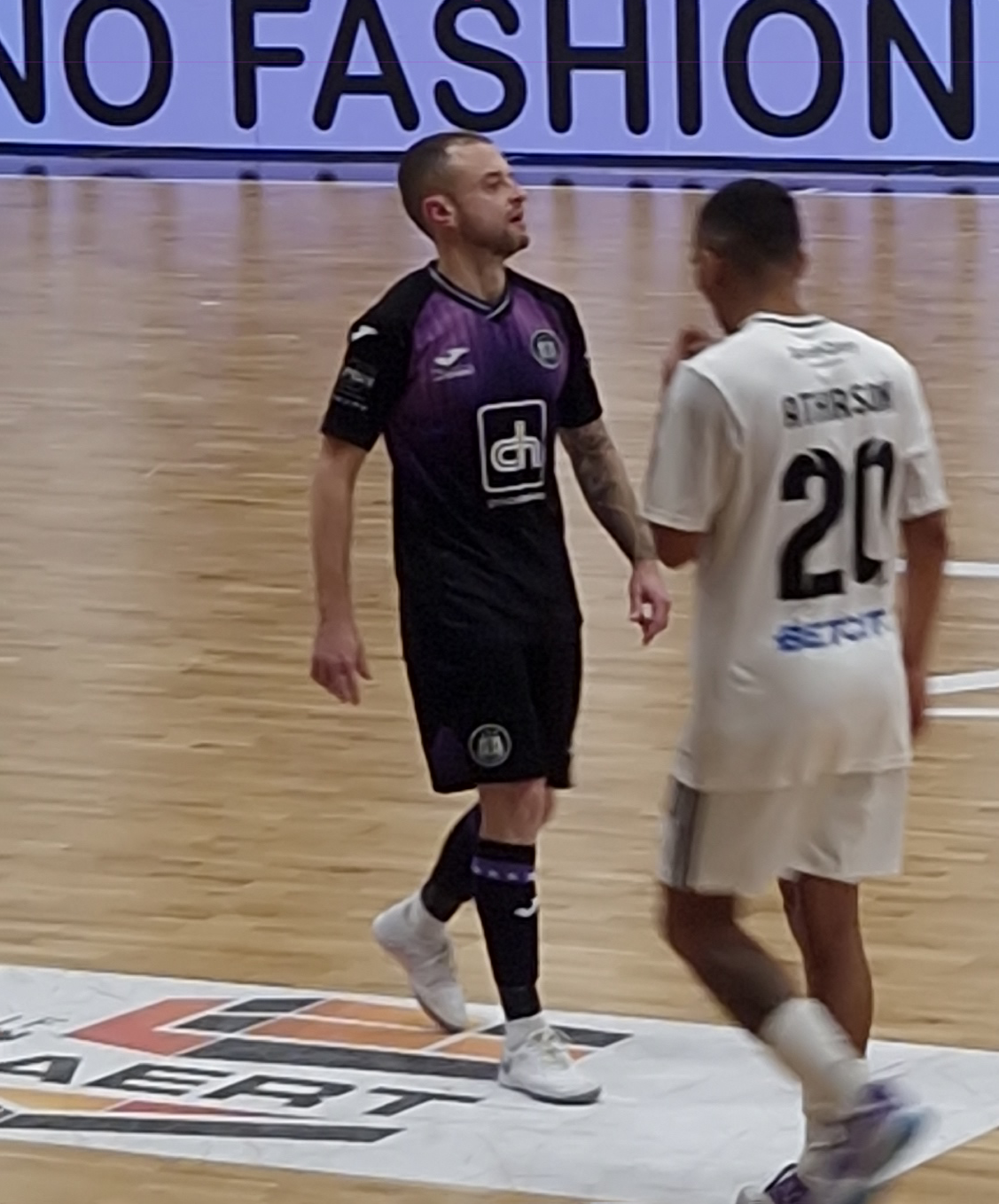
- Edu with RSCA Futsal during the 2025–26 Champions League

Personal information
- Full name: Eduardo Mello Borges
- Date of birth: 14 October 1986 (age 40)
- Place of birth: Brazil
- Position: Winger

Team information
- Current team: RSC Anderlecht Futsal
- Number: 6

Senior career*
Years	Team	Apps	(Gls)
2010–2018	Araz Naxçivan		
2018–2020	ACCS Futsal		
2020–	Halle-Gooik/Anderlecht		
2021	→ ACCS Futsal (loan)		

International career
	Azerbaijan	?	(1)
- * Club domestic league appearances and goals

Eduardo Mello Borges (born 14 October 1986), known simply as Edu, is a professional futsal player who plays as a winger for Belgian Futsal Division 1 club Anderlecht. Born in Brazil, he plays for the Azerbaijan national team.

== Honours ==
Araz Naxçivan

- Premier League: 2011–12, 2012–13, 2013–14, 2014–15, 2015–16, 2016–17
- Futsal Cup: 2010–11, 2011–12, 2012–13, 2013–14, 2015–16, 2016–17, 2017–18

Halle-Gooik

- Belgian Futsal Division 1: 2021–22
- Belgian Cup: 2021–22

Anderlecht

- Belgian Futsal Division 1: 2022–23, 2023–24, 2024–25
- Belgian Cup: 2022–23, 2023–24, 2024–25
- Belgian Super Cup: 2023, 2024
