= Nikolai Pereverzev =

Russian futsal player

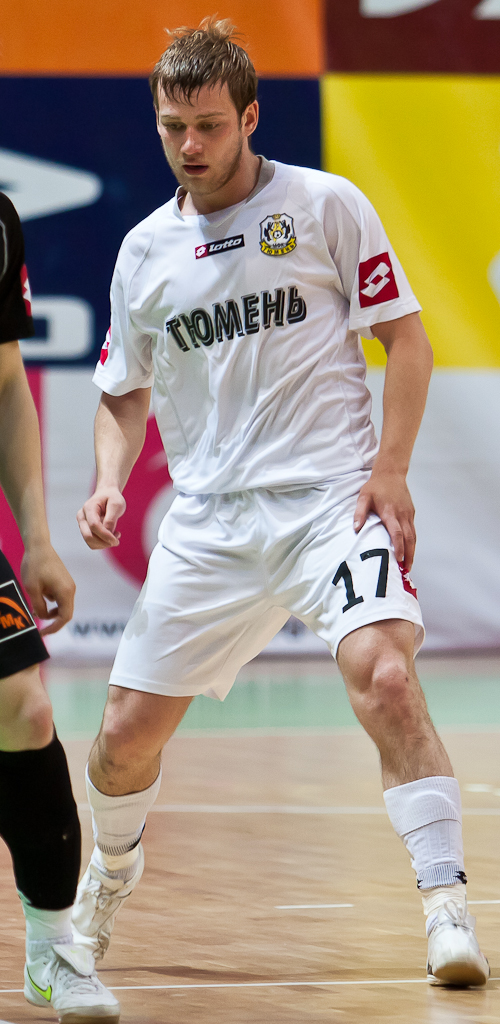

Personal information
- Full name: Nikolai Vladimirovich Pereverzev
- Date of birth: 15 December 1986 (age 39)
- Place of birth: Tyumen, Russian SFSR, Soviet Union
- Height: 1.70 m (5 ft 7 in)
- Position: Defender

Senior career*
Years	Team	Apps	(Gls)
2004–2017	Tyumen		

International career
2008–2016	Russia		
- * Club domestic league appearances and goals

Nikolai Vladimirovich Pereverzev (born 15 December 1986) is a retired Russian futsal player who last played for MFK Tyumen and the Russian national team.
