= Sergei Abramov (futsal player) =

Russian futsal player (born 1990)

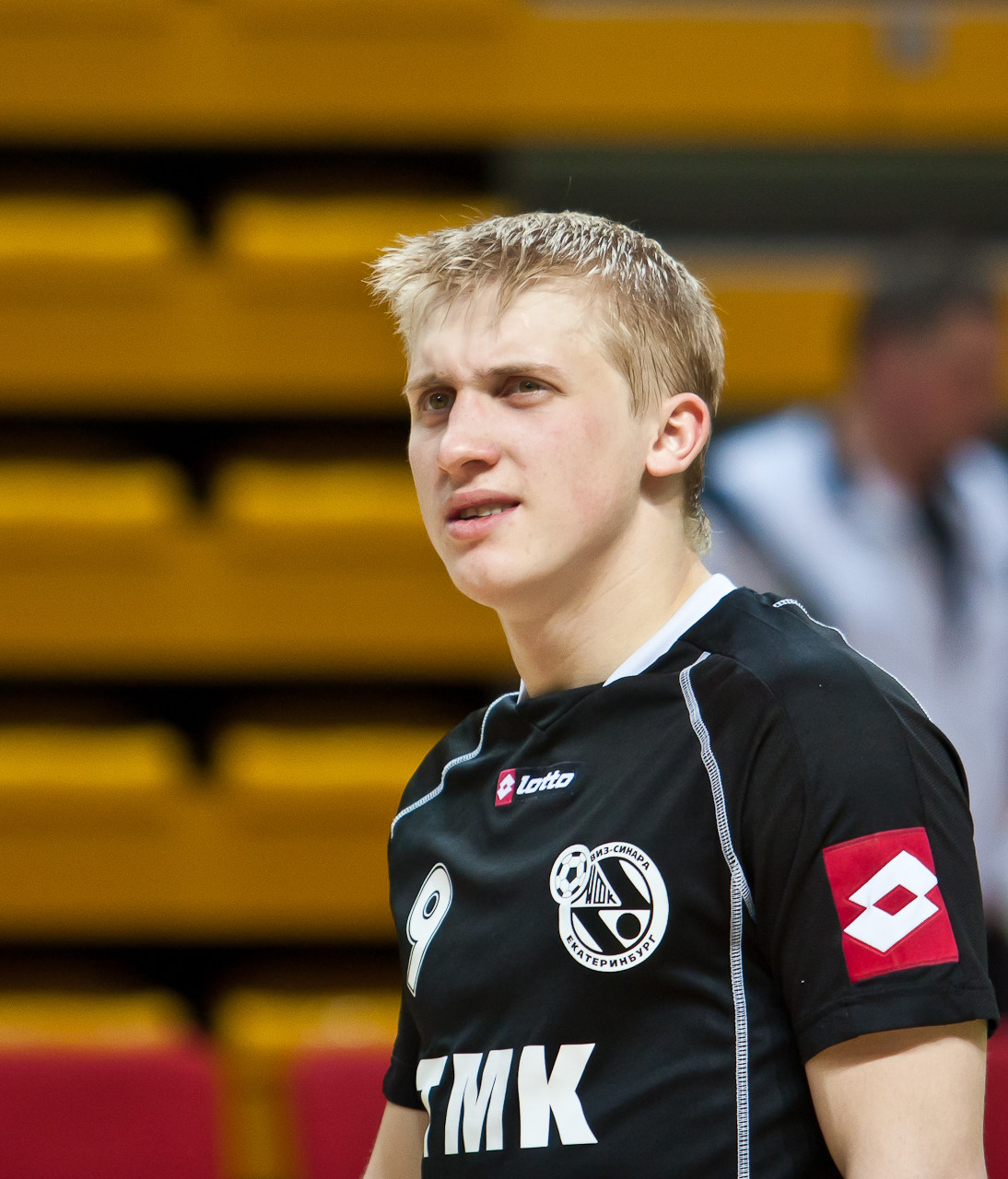

Personal information
- Full name: Sergei Alekseyevich Abramov
- Date of birth: 9 September 1990 (age 36)
- Place of birth: Russia
- Height: 1.69 m (5 ft 7 in)
- Position: Pivot

Team information
- Current team: Sinara

Senior career*
Years	Team	Apps	(Gls)
2007–2015	Viz-Sinara		
2015–2017	Dina Moscow		
2017–	Sinara		

International career
2010–	Russia		
- * Club domestic league appearances and goals

Sergei Alekseyevich Abramov (born 9 September 1990), is a Russian futsal player who plays for Sinara and the Russian national futsal team.

== Achievements ==
- Russian Futsal Championship winner (3): 2008/09, 2009/10, 2020/21
- Russian Futsal Cup winner (3): 2016/17, 2021/22, 2022/23
- Russian Futsal Supercup winner: 2023

=== Personal ===
- The best player of the Russian championship: 2020/21, 2022/23
- The best forward of the Russian championship: 2020/21
