= Jiří Novotný (futsal player) =

Czech futsal player

Novotný
Personal information
- Full name: Jiří Novotný
- Date of birth: 12 July 1988 (age 38)
- Place of birth: Czechoslovakia
- Position: Defender

Team information
- Current team: Bohemians

International career
| Years | Team | Apps | (Gls) |
- Czech Republic

Jiří Novotný (born 12 July 1988), is a Czech futsal player who plays for Bohemians and the Czech Republic national futsal team.
