= Augusto (futsal player) =

Brazilian-born Azerbaijani futsal player

Personal information
- Full name: Augusto César Vieira da Silva
- Date of birth: 25 February 1980 (age 46)
- Place of birth: Brazil
- Position: Pivot

Team information
- Current team: Araz Naxçivan
- Number: 18

Senior career*
Years	Team	Apps	(Gls)
- Iberia Star
- Araz Naxçivan

International career
- Azerbaijan
- * Club domestic league appearances and goals

Augusto César Vieira da Silva, a.k.a. Augusto (born 25 February 1980) is a Brazilian born, Azerbaijani futsal player who plays for Araz Naxçivan and the Azerbaijan national futsal team.
