= Romania national futsal team =

Romania
- Nickname(s): Tricolorii (The Tricolours)
- Association: Federaţia Română de Fotbal (FRF)
- Confederation: UEFA (Europe)
- Head coach: (Romania) Endre Kacsó
- FIFA code: ROU
- FIFA ranking: 39 ▼3 (8 May 2026)
- Highest FIFA ranking: 10 (14 May 2012)
- Lowest FIFA ranking: 24 (11 December 2017)
Home colours	Away colours

First international
- Romania 4–3 Bulgaria (Bucharest, Romania; 19 June 2003)

Biggest win
- Bulgaria 0–12 Romania (Varna, Bulgaria; 8 January 2004); Romania 12–0 England (Târgu Mureș, Romania; 22 June 2005)

Biggest defeat
- Brazil 12–0 Romania (2009 Grand Prix de Futsal Semifinals, Anápolis, Brazil; 3 July 2009)

FIFA World Cup
- Appearances: 0

European Championship
- Appearances: 4 (First in 2007)
- Best result: 6th place (2007, 2014)

Grand Prix de Futsal
- Appearances: 2 (First in 2009)
- Best result: (bronze) 3rd place (2009)

The Romania national futsal team represents Romania in international futsal competitions such as the FIFA Futsal World Cup and the European Championships and is controlled by the Romanian Football Federation.

== Tournament records ==
=== FIFA Futsal World Cup ===
FIFA Futsal World Cup record								Qualification record						
Year	Round	Pld	W	D	L	GF	GA	Outcome	Pld	W	D	L	GF	GA
(Netherlands) 1989	Did not enter							Did not enter						
(Hong Kong) 1992	Did not enter							Did not enter						
(Spain) 1996	Did not enter							Did not enter						
(Guatemala) 2000	Did not enter							Did not enter						
(Chinese Taipei) 2004	Did not qualify							Group 9 3rd place	2	0	0	2	4	10
(Brazil) 2008	Did not qualify							Play-offs	5	2	3	0	13	10
(Thailand) 2012	Did not qualify							Play-offs	5	3	0	2	18	12
(Colombia) 2016	Did not qualify							Group 6 3rd place	3	1	0	2	6	14
(Lithuania) 2021	Did not qualify							Group D 3rd place	6	2	2	2	13	15
(Uzbekistan) 2024	Did not qualify							Group A 3rd place	10	4	2	4	26	15
Total	0/10	0	0	0	0	0	0	6/10	31	12	6	12	80	76

=== UEFA Futsal Championship ===
UEFA Futsal Euro record								Qualification record						
Year	Round	Pld	W	D	L	GF	GA	Outcome	Pld	W	D	L	GF	GA
(Spain) 1996	Did not enter							Did not enter						
(Spain) 1999	Did not enter							Did not enter						
(Russia) 2001	Did not enter							Did not enter						
(Italy) 2003	Did not enter							Did not enter						
(Czech Republic) 2005	Did not qualify							Group B 4th Place	6	2	1	3	24	23
(Portugal) 2007	Group stage	3	1	0	2	9	14	Group G Winners	6	5	0	1	34	13
(Hungary) 2010	Did not qualify							Group 1 Runners-up	3	1	2	0	9	8
(Croatia) 2012	Quarterfinals	3	1	0	2	7	11	Group 4 Runners-up	3	2	0	1	9	7
(Belgium) 2014	Quarterfinals	3	1	0	2	6	8	Play-offs	5	3	1	1	17	8
(Serbia) 2016	Did not qualify							Play-offs	5	2	1	2	16	15
(Slovenia) 2018	Group stage	2	0	0	2	3	7	Play-offs	5	2	2	1	17	16
(Netherlands) 2022	Did not qualify							Group 4 3rd Place	6	1	3	2	19	17
(Latvia) (Lithuania) 2026	Did not qualify							Play-offs	8	3	1	4	22	16
Total	4/13	11	3	0	8	25	40	9/13	47	21	11	15	167	123

=== Grand Prix de Futsal ===
- 2005 – did not compete
- 2006 – did not compete
- 2007 – did not compete
- 2008 – did not compete
- 2009 – (bronze) 3rd place
- 2010 – 14th place
- 2011 – did not compete
- 2013 – did not compete
- 2014 – did not compete
- 2015 – did not compete
- 2018 – did not compete

== Players ==
=== Current squad ===
The following players were called up to the squad for the UEFA 2024 FIFA Futsal World Cup qualification matches against Azerbaijan and Kazakhstan on 15 and 20 September 2023, respectively.
Head coach: Endre Kacso

No.	Pos.	Player	Date of birth (age)	Caps	Club
1	GK	Theodor Lungu	5 February 2000 (age 26)		(Romania) CFR Timișoara
12	GK	Petrișor Toniță	28 January 1992 (age 34)		(Romania) United Galați
2	DF	Andor Bálint	30 May 2001 (age 24)		(Romania) FK Odorheiu Secuiesc
5	DF	Vlăduț Dudău	28 October 2000 (age 25)		(Romania) United Galați
14	DF	Paulo Ferreira	8 March 1985 (age 41)		(Portugal) Póvoa Futsal
18	DF	Szabolcs Mánya	30 January 1989 (age 37)		(Romania) ACS Sepsi SIC
20	DF	Andrei Crăciun	4 October 1988 (age 37)		(Romania) United Galați
3	FW	Richárd Iszlai	18 December 1999 (age 26)		(Romania) FK Odorheiu Secuiesc
6	FW	Valentin Ilaș	1 April 1987 (age 39)		(Romania) CFR Timișoara
7	FW	Daniel Araujo	15 March 1994 (age 32)		(Romania) United Galați
8	FW	André Luis Sasse	13 June 1997 (age 28)		(Czech Republic) FK Chrudim
9	FW	István Hadnagy	19 September 1996 (age 29)		(Romania) FK Odorheiu Secuiesc
10	FW	Felipe Mancha (captain)	16 December 1992 (age 33)		(Kuwait) Kazma SC
11	FW	Robert Crișan	30 August 2000 (age 25)		(Romania) United Galați
13	FW	Matei Boșneagă	26 June 2000 (age 25)		(Romania) United Galați
15	FW	Darius Nastai	5 December 2000 (age 25)		(Romania) CSM Deva

=== Recent call-ups ===
The following players have also been called up to the squad within the last 12 months.

Pos.	Player	Date of birth (age)	Caps	Goals	Club	Latest call-up
GK	Andrei Dinicuță	25 September 2000 (age 25)			(Romania) CSM Deva	v. Finland, 1 March 2023
DF	Szilárd Kanyó	1 July 1996 (age 29)			(Romania) FK Odorheiu Secuiesc	v. (Bosnia and Herzegovina) BiH, 15 January 2023
DF	Tamás Miklós	10 January 1993 (age 33)			(Romania) FK Odorheiu Secuiesc	v. Finland, 11 October 2022
FW	Mihnea Toader				(Romania) CFR Timișoara	v. Morocco, 9 August 2023
FW	Sávio Valadares	30 January 1994 (age 32)			(Romania) CSM Deva	v. Morocco, 9 August 2023
FW	Sergiu Gavrilă	2 November 2000 (age 25)			(Romania) CSM Deva	v. Denmark, 5 March 2023
FW	József Kerestély	16 February 2002 (age 24)			(Romania) FK Odorheiu Secuiesc	v. (Bosnia and Herzegovina) BiH, 15 January 2023
FW	Octavian Cireș	27 January 1993 (age 33)			(Romania) United Galați	v. Finland, 11 October 2022
FW	Adrian Oanea	30 March 1991 (age 35)			(Italy) Elledì Fossano	v. Moldova, 20 September 2022
^{COV} Player withdrew from the squad due to contracting COVID-19.^{INJ} Player withdrew from the squad due to an injury.^{PRE} Preliminary squad.^{RET} Retired from international futsal.

== Results and fixtures ==
2018 Friendly	Romania	5–4	Moldova

2018 Friendly	Romania	6–4	Moldova

2018 UEFA Futsal Euro 2018	Portugal	4–1	Romania

2018 UEFA Futsal Euro 2018	Ukraine	3–2	Romania

2018 Friendly	Romania	3–1	Albania

2018 Friendly	Romania	4–3	Albania

2018 Friendly	Romania	0–3	Spain

2018 Friendly	Romania	1–0	Spain

2019 Friendly	Romania	0–2	Italy

2019 Friendly	Romania	2–4	Italy

2019 Friendly	Romania	5–1	Armenia

2019 Friendly	Romania	5–3	Armenia

== See also ==
- Romania national beach soccer team
- Romania national football team
- Romania national minifootball team
