= Sweden men's national futsal team results =

The following is a list of the Sweden national futsal team all official international matches.

== 2012–13 ==
11 December 2012 Friendly	Sweden	2 – 3	France	Gothenburg, Sweden
	Chekroun 17'; Karlsson 37'	Report	Sao 2', 16', 38'	Stadium: Lisebergshallen; Attendance: 1,253; Referee: Fredric Nilholt (Sweden)

12 December 2012 Friendly	Sweden	3 – 5	France	Gothenburg, Sweden
	Mönell 6', 38' own goal 23'	Report	Hamoud 25' 40'; Kah 28'; Prasitharath 29'; Sao 40'	Stadium: Lisebergshallen; Attendance: 1,140; Referee: Jacky Subocz (France)

12 January 2013 Friendly	Sweden	3 – 4	Denmark	Skövde, Sweden
	Abraham 18', 40'; Karlsson 30'	Report	Bonde 4', 22', 27'; Larsen 9'	Stadium: Arena Skövde; Attendance: 2,373; Referee: Fredric Nilholt (Sweden)

23 January 2013 ECH 2014 Q	Israel	2 – 4	Sweden	Andorra la Vella, Andorra
	Cohen 5', 25'	Report	Legiec 18', 40'; Zisman 30' (o.g.); Karlsson 33'	Stadium: Centre Esportiu Serradells; Referee: Elchin Samadli (Azerbaijan)

24 January 2013 ECH 2014 Q	Andorra	2 – 4	Sweden	Andorra la Vella, Andorra
	Barbosa 36'; Raventós 40'	Report	Zhubi 18', 38'; Chekroun 19'; Legiec 32'	Stadium: Centre Esportiu Serradells; Referee: Antonis Constantinides (Cyprus)

26 January 2013 ECH 2014 Q	Sweden	2 – 0	Estonia	Andorra la Vella, Andorra
	Vega 20'; Abraham 22'	Report		Stadium: Centre Esportiu Serradells; Referee: Elchin Samadli (Azerbaijan)

23 February 2013 Friendly	Sweden	4 – 3	Norway	Gothenburg, Sweden
	Asp 2'; El Moussaoui 9' (o.g.); Karlsson 11'; Mönell 27'	Report	Skaga 16'; Egholm 33'; Johnsen 40'	Stadium: Lisebergshallen; Attendance: 752; Referee: Fredric Nilholt (Sweden)

27 March 2013 ECH 2014 Q	Croatia	7 – 0	Sweden	Águilas, Spain
	Marinović 4', 19'; Grcić 16', 17'; Jelovčić 25'; Grbeša 26'; Babić 33'	Report		Stadium: Diego Calvo Valera Hall; Referee: Alessandro Malfer (Italy)

28 March 2013 ECH 2014 Q	Spain	13 – 0	Sweden	Águilas, Spain
	Ruiz 3', 35'; Ortiz 7', 14', 17'; Miguelín 8', 27'; Lozano 10', 28'; Usín 18'; Torras 22'; Campos 32'; Lin 33'	Report		Stadium: Diego Calvo Valera Hall; Referee: Ozan Soykan (Turkey)

30 March 2013 ECH 2014 Q	Sweden	2 – 4	North Macedonia	Águilas, Spain
	Mönell 12'; Zhubi 36'	Report	Jovanovski 23'; Todorovski 36'; Leveski 39'; Rangotov 40'	Stadium: Diego Calvo Valera Hall; Referee: Aleksandrs Golubevs (Latvia)

== 2013–14 ==
4 December 2013 2013 Nordic Cup	Denmark	3 – 4	Sweden	Nykøbing Falster, Denmark
	Jørgensen 14'; Lucht 17'; Petersen 25'; Jensen 33'		Mönell 5'; Legiec 37'; Pahlevan 39'	Stadium: PriceRunner Arena; Attendance: 300

6 December 2013 2013 Nordic Cup	Sweden	4 – 3	Finland	Nykøbing Falster, Denmark
	Legiec 19'; S. Abraham 25', 29'; Etéus 32'		Autio 10'; Teittinen 19'; Hosio 33'	Stadium: PriceRunner Arena; Attendance: 220

7 December 2013 2013 Nordic Cup	Sweden	5 – 1	Norway	Nykøbing Falster, Denmark
	Mönell 12'; Etéus 29'; Chekroun 30'; Legiec 36', 39'		Sæther 17'	Stadium: PriceRunner Arena; Attendance: 138

7 January 2014 Friendly	France	3 – 0	Sweden	Besançon, France
	Belha 33'; Otmani 37', 38'	Report		Stadium: Palais des Sports; Attendance: 3,400

8 January 2014 Friendly	France	7 – 5	Sweden	Belfort, France
	A. Mohammed 4', 19', 22', 31'; Aigoun 11'; Le Boette 15'; Rabei 32'	Report	Chekroun 3' own goal 10'; Legiec 20', 20'; Roxström 29'	Stadium: Gymnase le Phare; Attendance: 1,424

23 February 2014 Friendly	Sweden	3 – 3	England	Lindesberg, Sweden
	Ćatović 19'; Abraham 26', 35'	Report	Cook 12'; Ballinger 18', 27'	Stadium: Lindesberg Arena; Attendance: 664

24 February 2014 Friendly	Sweden	3 – 2	England	Örebro, Sweden
	Legiec 21', 30', 36'	Report	Parkes 22', 40'	Stadium: Nya Idrottshuset; Attendance: 1,121

== 2014–15 ==
4 December 2014 2014 Nordic Cup	Norway	3 – 3	Sweden	Hyvinkää, Finland
	Moen 17'; Ravlo 25'; Sortevik 38'		Lajaab 7' (o.g.); Ćatović 28'; Etéus 40'	Stadium: Martinhalli; Attendance: 85

5 December 2014 2014 Nordic Cup	Sweden	1 – 5	Finland	Tampere, Finland
	Ladan 8'		Jyrkiäinen 9'; Autio 17'; Teittinen 19'; Hosio 26'; Kytölä 39'	Stadium: Pirkkahalli; Attendance: 531

7 December 2014 2014 Nordic Cup	Denmark	2 – 2	Sweden	Hyvinkää, Finland
	Jørgensen 20'; Jensen 39'		Roxström 20'; Burda 30'	Stadium: Martinhalli; Attendance: 72

7 January 2015 Friendly	Sweden	4 – 0	Turkey	Malmö, Sweden
	Asp 15'; Mönell 17'; S. Abraham 23'; Hiseni 37'			Stadium: Baltiska Hallen; Attendance: 1,457

8 January 2015 Friendly	Sweden	0 – 3	Turkey	Malmö, Sweden
			Mengi 14'; Keskin 17'; Özcan 37'	Stadium: Baltiska Hallen; Attendance: 803

14 January 2015 ECH 2016 Q	Sweden	3 – 4	Armenia	Skövde, Sweden
	Mönell 2'; Etéus 17'; Asp 32'	Report	H. Grigoryan 5'; Karapetyan 16', 27'; Babayan 21'	Stadium: Arena Skövde; Attendance: 684; Referee: Fabio Gelonese (Italy)

15 January 2015 ECH 2016 Q	Sweden	13 – 0	Scotland	Skövde, Sweden
	Legiec 10', 27', 36'; Asp 18'; Burda 20'; S. Abraham 25', 32', 38'; Etéus 30'; H. Abraham 31'; Hiseni 33'; Mönell 34', 35'	Report		Stadium: Arena Skövde; Attendance: 768; Referee: Fabio Gelonese (Italy)

17 January 2015 ECH 2016 Q	Israel	0 – 4	Sweden	Skövde, Sweden
			Legiec 15'; Rashidi 18'; Etéus 22'; H. Abraham 29'	Stadium: Arena Skövde; Attendance: 1,711; Referee: Cédric Pelissier (France)

27 February 2015 Friendly	England	1 – 3	Sweden	London, England
	Rexha 33'		Legiec 9'; Etéus 19', 25'	Stadium: Copper Box; Attendance: 878

28 February 2015 Friendly	England	7 – 3	Sweden	London, England
	Cook 3'; Ballinger 5', 7', 32'; Wallace 9'; Rexha 25', 37'		Kuhi 23'; S. Abraham 34', 34'	Stadium: Copper Box; Attendance: 1,430

== 2015–16 ==
15 September 2015 Friendly	Turkey	4 – 4	Sweden	Bursa, Turkey
	Erdal 16', 17', 31'; Gürbür Akkoc 27'		Stefansson 8', 36'; Etéus 16'; Legiec 19'	Stadium: Nılüfer Spor Salonu; Attendance: 107

16 September 2015 Friendly	Turkey	5 – 3	Sweden	Bursa, Turkey
	Özkan 3', 39'; Demiral 12'; Gürbür Akkoc 28'; Erdal 32'		Svensson 8'; Legiec 15'; Jönsson 17'	Stadium: Nılüfer Spor Salonu; Attendance: 55

22 October 2015 WCH 2016 Q	Sweden	3 – 3	Montenegro	Uddevalla, Sweden
	Chekroun 8'; H. Abraham 9'; Mönell 30'		Gurzakovic 17'; Draskovic 17'; Bajovic; 35'	Stadium: Agnebergshallen; Attendance: 925; Referee: Gábor Kovács (Hungary)

23 October 2015 WCH 2016 Q	Sweden	9 – 4	San Marino	Uddevalla, Sweden
	Asp 6'; S. Abraham 7', 9'; Mönell 9', 17'; Legiec 10', 40'; Hiseni 31'; Kuhi 40'		Moretti 7'; Barducci 20'; Michelotti 22'; Pasqualini 35'	Stadium: Agnebergshallen; Attendance: 942; Referee: Damian Jaruchiewicz (Poland)

25 October 2015 WCH 2016 Q	Greece	1 – 4	Sweden	Uddevalla, Sweden
	V. Asimakopoulos 33'		Mönell 6', 15'; H. Abraham 16'; Etéus 26'	Stadium: Agnebergshallen; Attendance: 1,040; Referee: Gábor Kovács (Hungary)

21 November 2015 Friendly	Norway	2 – 2	Sweden	Oslo, Norway
	Acrifi 15'; Pedersen 23'		Beqiri 11'; Legiec 32'	Stadium: Ammerud Idrettshall; Attendance: 104

22 November 2015 Friendly	Norway	3 – 4	Sweden	Oslo, Norway
	Skaga 6'; Acrifi 6', 16'		Legiec 19'; H. Abraham 23'; Beqiri 23'; Mönell 37'	Stadium: Ammerud Idrettshall; Attendance: 176

10 December 2015 WCH 2016 Q	Azerbaijan	8 – 2	Sweden	Osijek, Croatia
	Borisov 3', 15'; Augusto 11'; Amadeu 11'; De Araujo 20'; Eduardo 25', 26', 36'	Report	Legiec 24'; Etéus 33'	Stadium: Gradski vrt Hall; Referee: Gábor Kovács (Hungary), Trayan Enchev (Bulgaria)

11 December 2015 WCH 2016 Q	Croatia	5 – 1	Sweden	Osijek, Croatia
	Matošević 2'; Suton 25', 33'; Marinović 30'; Grcić 36'	Report	S. Abraham 13'	Stadium: Gradski vrt Hall; Referee: Vladimir Kadykov (Russia), Gábor Kovács (Hungary)

13 December 2015 WCH 2016 Q	Sweden	2 – 2	Belarus	Osijek, Croatia
	Mönell 22'; Burda 32'	Report	Chernik 18'; Silivonchik 26'	Stadium: Gradski vrt Hall; Referee: Gerd Bylois (Belgium), Trayan Enchev (Bulgaria)

23 January 2016 Friendly	Sweden	5 – 2	Denmark	Helsingborg, Sweden
	Legiec 3', 31'; Berisha 24'; S. Abraham 28'; H. Abraham 36'		Falck 4'; Lucht 23'	Stadium: Helsingborg Arena; Attendance: 890; Referee: Toni Lehtinen (Finland)

24 January 2016 Friendly	Denmark	5 – 1	Sweden	Copenhagen, Denmark
	Bonde Jensen 2'; Jørgensen 7', 21'; Badran 30'; Falck 38'		Mönell 19'	Stadium: Farum Arena; Referee: Toni Lehtinen (Finland)

29 February 2016 Friendly	Sweden	3 – 6	Finland	Skövde, Sweden
	Stefanson 10'; Mönell 14'; S. Abraham 26'		Junno 12'; Kytölä 22'; Hosio 30'; Autio 35'; Tirkkonen 37'; Savolainen 39'	Stadium: Arena Skövde; Attendance: 612; Referee: Fredric Nilholt (Sweden

1 March 2016 Friendly	Sweden	5 – 2	Finland	Skövde, Sweden
	Zhubi 5'; Ostojic 17'; S. Abraham; 23'; Rossi 33'; Berisha 39'		Autio 13'; Kytölä 15'	Stadium: Arena Skövde; Attendance: 467; Referee: Kiril Naishouler (Finland)

== 2016–17 ==
29 October 2016 Friendly	Sweden	4–6	Czech Republic	Umeå, Sweden
	S. Abraham 4', 25'; Rossi 5'; Etéus 37'		Resetár 6'; Slovácek 11', 23'; Cupák 12', 34'; Koudelka 16'	Stadium: Umeå Energi Arena; Attendance: 1,205; Referee: Fredric Nilholt (Sweden)

30 October 2016 Friendly	Sweden	3–6	Czech Republic	Skellefteå, Sweden
	S. Abraham 4'; Zhubi 7'; Kuhi 34'		Cupák 11', 17'; Belej 25'; Záruba 27', 39'; Vahala 40'	Stadium: Balderhallen; Attendance: 1,093

30 November 2016 2016 Nordic Cup	Denmark	2–2	Sweden	Skövde, Sweden
	Ostojic 25' (o.g.); Fogt 32'		Ostojic 9', 32'	Stadium: Arena Skövde; Attendance: 863; Referee: Omar Rafiq (Norway)

2 December 2016 2016 Nordic Cup	Sweden	0–1	Finland	Jönköping, Sweden
			Kytölä 30'	Stadium: Jönköpings idrottshus Attendance: 1,094; Referee: Omar Rafiq (Norway)

3 December 2016 2016 Nordic Cup	Norway	1–4	Sweden	Skövde, Sweden
	Espegren 37'		Rossi 2'; Asp 16'; Legiec 22', 39'	Stadium: Arena Skövde; Attendance: 676; Referee: David Nissen (Denmark)

4 December 2016 2016 Nordic Cup	Sweden	5–0	Greenland	Skövde, Sweden
	Asp 6'; Söderqvist 7', 23'; Kaplan 35'; Abraham 37'			Stadium: Arena Skövde; Referee: Kirill Naishouler (Finland)

29 January 2017 ECH 2018 Q	Montenegro	11–4	Sweden	Gibraltar
	Bajović 5', 25', 28', 35'; Il. Mugoša 9', 28'; Bajčetić 14', 38'; Drašković 16'; Despotović 35' (pen.); Čalasan 40'		Ostojic 7'; Bagger 35', 36'; Legiec 38'	Stadium: Tercentenary Sports Hall

30 January 2017 ECH 2018 Q	Sweden	5–1	Gibraltar	Gibraltar
	Söderqvist 5'; Mönell 21'; Legiec 37', 39'; Rossi 40'		Lopez 3'	Stadium: Tercentenary Sports Hall; Referee: Vladimir Kadykov (Russia)

== 2017–18 ==
23 September 2017 Friendly	Sweden	2–3	Wales	Visby, Sweden
	Bagger 37'; Rossi 37'		Arsan 5'; Orme 29'; Hugh 37'	Stadium: ICA Maxi Arena; Attendance: 627; Referee: Ademir Avdic (Sweden)

24 September 2017 Friendly	Sweden	2–2	Wales	Visby, Sweden
	Zhubi 9'; Arsan 24' (o.g.)		Maynard 11'; Thomas 13'	Stadium: ICA Maxi Arena; Attendance: 537; Referee: Carl Hughes (Wales)

11 November 2017 Friendly	Sweden	1–3	Hungary	Norrköping, Sweden
	Delimedjac 31'		Horvath 9'; Hajmazi 15'; Hiseni 26' (o.g.)	Stadium: Himmelstalundshallen; Attendance: 719; Referee: Fredric Nilholt (Sweden)

12 November 2017 Friendly	Sweden	5–4	Hungary	Eskilstuna, Sweden
	? 4' (o.g.); Chekroun 10', 19'; Rossi 27'; Bagger 40'		Pal 17', 20'; Tatai 37', 40'	Stadium: Stiga Sports Arena; Attendance: 818; Referee: Norbert Sziágyi (Hungary)

5 December 2017 2017 Nordic Cup	Finland	6–1	Sweden	Stjørdal, Norway
	Hosio 9', 35', 40'; Junno 24', 40'; Autio 25'		Zhubi 7'	Stadium: Stjørdalshallen

6 December 2017 2017 Nordic Cup	Denmark	4–3	Sweden	Stjørdal, Norway
	Mojab 19'; Bothmann Hougaard 27'; Jørgensen 30'; Borum Larsen 30'		Legiec 20'; Zhubi 20'; Nashabat 34'	Stadium: Stjørdalshallen; Referee: David Nilsen (Norway)

7 December 2017 2017 Nordic Cup	Sweden	5–3	Greenland	Stjørdal, Norway
	14:08 Etéus 15'; Delimediac 18'; Asp 28'; Johansson 35'; Kadivar 37'		Kreutzmann 7'; Thorleifsen 28'; Ezekiassen 34'	Stadium: Stjørdalshallen

8 December 2017 2017 Nordic Cup	Norway	3–1	Sweden	Stjørdal, Norway
	Dønnem 12'; Ovesen 28'; Wiseth 39'		Etéus 19'	Stadium: Stjørdalshallen

1 April 2018 Friendly	Sweden	4–3	Latvia	Örebro, Sweden
	Zhubi 2'; Etéus 20'; Smajlovic 28'; Hiseni 36'		Avanesovs 4', 21'; Zabarovskis 31'	Stadium: Nya Idrottshuset; Attendance: 517; Referee: Fredric Nilholt (Sweden)

2 April 2018 Friendly	Sweden	8–6	Latvia	Örebro, Sweden
	Legiec 1', 27'; Etéus 2', 31'; Rastoder 7'; Zhubi 18', 23'; Lext 22'		Pastars 3'; Zabarovskis 13', 29'; Kadivar 15' (o.g.); Avanesovs 23'; Germans Matjušenko 24'	Stadium: Nya Idrottshuset; Attendance: 381; Referee: Eduards Fatkuļins (Latvia)

== 2018–19 ==
25 September 2018 Friendly	Sweden	0–3	France	Gävle, Sweden
			Petrit Zhubi 5' (o.g.); Mouhoudine 22'; Gasmi 35'	Stadium: Gavlehovshallen; Attendance: 1,114; Referee: Haris Curovac (Sweden)

26 September 2018 Friendly	Sweden	2–5	France	Gävle, Sweden
	Johnsson 7'; Kadivar 25'		Andrade 12', 36'; Lutin 31'; Mohammed 32'; Aigoun 38'	Stadium: Gavlehovshallen; Attendance: 1,004; Referee: Julien Lang (France)

29 October 2018 Friendly	Sweden	4–1	Netherlands	Enköping, Sweden
	Legiec 5', 19'; Kadivar 11'; Hiseni 26'	Report	el Ghannouit 2'	Stadium: Idrottshuset; Attendance: 496; Referee: Ademir Avdic (Sweden)

30 October 2018 Friendly	Sweden	2–4	Netherlands	Uppsala, Sweden
	Legiec 22'; Hiseni 27'		Bouzambou 8' ? 20' (o.g.); Makraou 26'; Martinus 39'	Stadium: IFU Arena; Referee: Ibrahim El Jjilali (Netherlands)

4 December 2018 2018 Nordic Cup	Sweden	6–5	Denmark	Ringkøbing, Denmark
	Söderqvist 2'; Smajlovic 10', 31'; Delimedjac 23'; Zhubi 36', 39'		Jørgensen 14', 32'; Scott 16', 17', 29'	Stadium: Ringkøbing-Skjern Kulturcenter; Referee: Kirill Naishouler (Finland

5 December 2018 2018 Nordic Cup	Finland	5–2	Sweden	Ringkøbing, Denmark
	M. Kytölä 1'; Hosio 3'; Teittinen 3'; J. Kytölä 13'; Autio 23'		Söderqvist 20'; Najafi 39'	Stadium: Ringkøbing-Skjern Kulturcenter; Referee: David Nissen (Denmark)

6 December 2018 2018 Nordic Cup	Sweden	6–5	Greenland	Ringkøbing, Denmark
	Johnsson 9'; Delimedjac 15', 28'; Coralic 30'; Zhubi 34'; 38' (o.g.)		Reimer 9'; 20' (o.g.); Eriksen Petersen 23'; Thorleifsen 31'; Funch 35'	Stadium: Ringkøbing-Skjern Kulturcenter; Referee: Martin Køster (Denmark)

8 December 2018 2018 Nordic Cup	Norway	1–6	Sweden	Ringkøbing, Denmark
	Schjetne 21'		Chekroun 8', 37'; Zhubi 9'; Kadivar 10', 38'; Najafi 21'	Stadium: Ringkøbing-Skjern Kulturcenter; Referee: Kirill Naishouler (Finland

30 January 2019 WCH 2020 Q	Sweden	3-1	Armenia	Alingsås, Sweden
	Legiec 15', 16'; Kadivar 25'		Galstyan 20'	Stadium: Estrad; Attendance: 1,148

31 January 2019 WCH 2020 Q	Sweden	5–1	Malta	Alingsås, Sweden
	Smajlovic 3'; Najafi 4', 34'; Zhubi 6'; Kadivar 40'		Zammit 29'	Stadium: Estrad; Attendance: 1,295

2 February 2019 WCH 2020 Q	Belgium	8–5	Sweden	Alingsås, Sweden
	Dujacquier 7', 36', 39'; Diniz Pinheiro 10', 32'; Sababti 20', 22'; Adnane 21'		Zhubi 1', 5'; Hiseni 12'; Legiec 25'; Söderqvist 38'	Stadium: Estrad; Attendance: 2,034

14 April 2019 4-Nations Tournament	Sweden	5–7	Montenegro	Poreč, Croatia
				Stadium: SRC Veli Jože

15 April 2019 4-Nations Tournament	Tajikistan	7–6	Sweden	Poreč, Croatia
				Stadium: SRC Veli Jože

16 April 2019 4-Nations Tournament	Sweden	2–5	Hungary	Poreč, Croatia
				Stadium: SRC Veli Jože

== 2019–20 ==
23 September 2019 Friendly	Sweden	2–3	Germany	Karlskrona, Sweden
	Legiec 11'; Kadivar 23'		Heinze 3'; Hirosawa 11'; Saglam 38'	Stadium: Brinova Arena; Attendance: 1,014

24 September 2019 Friendly	Sweden	6–4	Germany	Karlskrona, Sweden
				Stadium: Brinova Arena

23 October 2019 WCH 2020 Q	Russia	7–3	Sweden	Dubrovnik, Croatia
				Stadium: Športska dvorana Gospino polje

24 October 2019 WCH 2020 Q	Croatia	3–1	Sweden	Dubrovnik, Croatia
				Stadium: Športska dvorana Gospino polje

26 October 2019 WCH 2020 Q	Sweden	3–6	Bosnia and Herzegovina	Dubrovnik, Croatia
				Stadium: Športska dvorana Gospino polje

29 November 2019 2019 Nordic Cup	Norway	2–1	Sweden	Turku, Finland
				Stadium: Kupittaan jäähalli Attendance: 57

30 November 2019 2019 Nordic Cup	Sweden	7–1	Greenland	Turku, Finland
				Stadium: Kupittaan jäähalli Referee: 56

2 December 2019 2019 Nordic Cup	Denmark	4–5	Sweden	Turku, Finland
				Stadium: Kupittaan jäähalli Attendance: 39

3 December 2019 2019 Nordic Cup	Sweden	1–3	Finland	Turku, Finland
				Stadium: Kupittaan jäähalli Attendance: 250

29 January 2020 ECH 2020 Q	Sweden	6–4	Malta	Pembroke, Malta
				Stadium: National School of Sport

30 January 2020 ECH 2020 Q	Sweden	0–6	Poland	Pembroke, Malta
				Stadium: National School of Sport

1 February 2020 ECH 2020 Q	Greece	4–3	Sweden	Pembroke, Malta
				Stadium: National School of Sport

== Sources ==
- Official page
