= Zhubi =

Zhubi is an Albanian surname. Notable people with the surname include:

- Mentor Zhubi (born 1984), Swedish Futsal and football player
- Petrit Zhubi (born 1988), Swedish footballer, brother of Mentor

== See also ==
- Zhubei (disambiguation)
- Zhubi River
