= Jonatan Almendra =

Chilean footballer and futsal player

Personal information
- Full name: Jonatan Andrés Almendra Cifuentes
- Date of birth: 25 April 1991 (age 35)
- Place of birth: Concepción, Chile
- Position: Forward

Youth career
- Deportes Concepción

Senior career*
Years	Team	Apps	(Gls)
2011	Deportes Concepción		
2012	Universidad de Concepción		
2013	Wairarapa United		
2013	Fernández Vial		
2014	Naval		
2014–2015	Deportes Linares	4	(1)
2015–2016	Naval	27	(8)
2016	Fernández Vial		
2017–2018	Huddinge IF		
2018–2019	Arameisk-Syrianska	4	(0)
2018–2019	→ Tungelsta IF (loan)		(23)
2019	Nacka Juniors (futsal)	6	(8)
2019–2020	Djurgården (futsal)		
2020	Västerhaninge IF		
2020–2023	Hammarby (futsal)		
2021	Fittja IF		
2022	FC Brandbergen		
- * Club domestic league appearances and goals

Jonatan Andrés Almendra Cifuentes (born 25 April 1991) is a Chilean former footballer and futsal player who played as a forward for clubs in Chile, New Zealand and Sweden.

== Football career ==
A forward from the Deportes Concepción youth system, Almendra switched to Universidad de Concepción before emigrating to New Zealand and playing for Central League side Wairarapa United in 2013.

The same year, he returned to his homeland and played for Fernández Vial, winning the league title of the Tercera A. After, he played for Deportes Linares, Naval and Fernández Vial, for second time.

After training with Deportes Concepción, he moved to Sweden and signed with Huddinge IF in 2017. Then, he switched to Arameisk-Syrianska, being loaned to Tungelsta IF in 2018, where he coincided with his compatriots Víctor Guglielmotti and Cristián González and scored eleven goals in nine matches in his first season. In the Swedish football, he also played for Västerhaninge IF, Fittja IF and FC Brandbergen.

== Futsal career ==
After playing for futsal club Nacka Juniors FF in the second half 2019, scoring eight goals in six matches, he signed with Djurgården.

In 2020, he signed with Hammarby, whose owner is the Sweden international Zlatan Ibrahimovic, with whom he took part of the UEFA Futsal Champions League and won the 2020–21 Swedish Futsal League.

== Personal life ==
Almendra is the younger brother of the former Chile international Patricio Almendra.

He married the Swedish citizen Lina-Maja Bronnvall and they have a son, Mattheo. They made his home in Sweden.

He has kept a friendship with another Chilean footballers in Sweden such as Víctor Guglielmotti and Cristián González.
