= Kadivar =

Kadivar (Persian: کدیور) is an Iranian surname. Notable people with the surname include:

- Jamileh Kadivar (born 1963), Iranian politician
- Mohsen Kadivar (born 1959), Iranian philosopher and professor
- Nima Kadivar (born 1994), Swedish futsal player
