= Zhubei (disambiguation) =

Zhubei is a city in Hsinchu County of the streamlined Taiwan Province, Republic of China.

Zhubei may also refer to:

- Zhubei Expressway (筑北高速公路), also referred to as the G7522 Guiyang–Beihai Expressway, an expressway in China
- Zhubei railway station, a railway station on the Taiwan Railways Administration West Coast line
- Zhubei Town (朱备镇), Qingyang, Anhui Province, China
- Zhubei Township (竹北乡), Dazhu County, Sichuan Province, China
- Zhubei Village (朱北村), Dabaozi, Qinghai Province, China
- Zhubei Village (竹北里), Cianjhen District, Kaohsiung, Taiwan

== See also ==
- Zhubi
