= Víctor Guglielmotti =

Chilean footballer (born 1975)

Personal information
- Full name: Víctor Hugo Guglielmotti Tobosque
- Date of birth: 24 December 1975 (age 50)
- Place of birth: Chile
- Height: 1.75 m (5 ft 9 in)
- Position: Left-back

Youth career
- 1989–1994: Everton

Senior career*
Years	Team	Apps	(Gls)
1995–2001	Everton		(12)
2007	Valsta Syrianska		
2008–2010	Syrianska FC	21	(0)
- * Club domestic league appearances and goals

Víctor Hugo Guglielmotti Tobosque (born 24 December 1975) is a Chilean former footballer who played as a left-back for clubs in Chile and Sweden.

== Career ==
A left-back from the Everton de Viña del Mar youth system, Guglielmotti made appearances in the Chilean Primera División in 1995 and 2000, staying with them until 2001.

In 2007, he emigrated to Sweden and joined Valsta Syrianska IK, moving to Syrianska FC in the next season, making twenty one appearances for them at league level. As a member of Syrianska FC, he won the league title of the Division 1 Norra in 2008, getting promotion to the Superettan.

He officially retired in 2011

== Personal life ==
Guglielmotti made his home in Sweden and has worked for Dafo Brand, a company of fire and rescue systems.

Following his retirement, he went on playing football at amateur level for Rapa Nui FK, serving after as head of the club, and another clubs such as Tungelsta IF. He also has kept a friendship with another Chilean footballers in Sweden such as Cristián González and Jonatan Almendra.

== Honours ==
Syrianska FC

- Division 1 Norra: 2008
