= Lassi Lintula =

Finnish professional futsal player (born 1997)

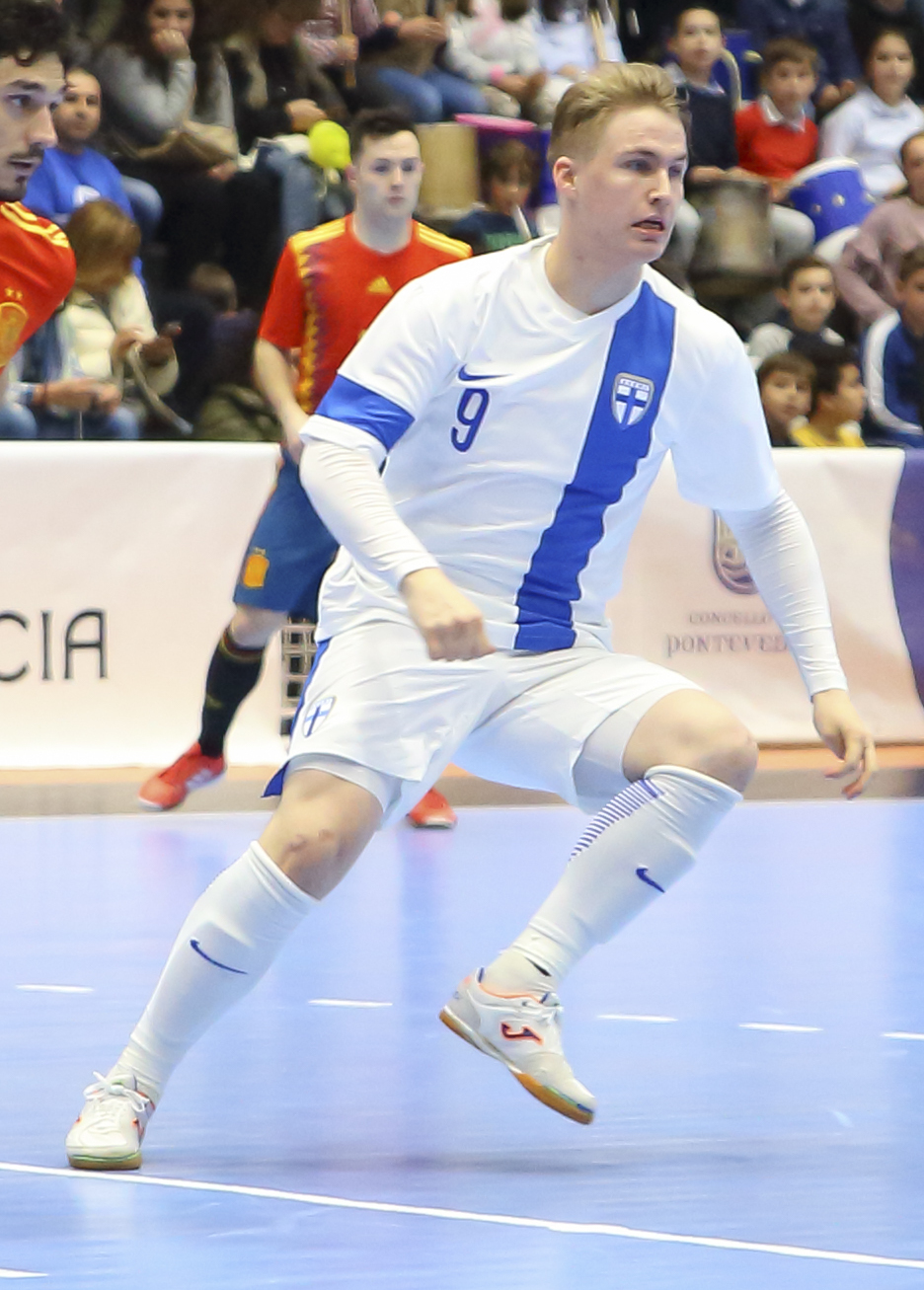
- Lintula in a match against Spain in 2018

Personal information
- Full name: Lassi Arttu Valtteri Lintula
- Date of birth: 25 June 1997 (age 29)
- Place of birth: Ylöjärvi, Finland
- Height: 1.75 m (5 ft 9 in)

Team information
- Current team: MNK Square Dubrovnik
- Number: 7

Youth career
- TPV
- Ilves FS

Senior career*
Years	Team	Apps	(Gls)
2014–2019	Ilves FS	114	(43)
2019–2022	Kampuksen Dynamo	81	(55)
2023	Piast Gliwice	7	(1)
2023–	MNK Square Dubrovnik	23	(5)

International career
2014–	Finland	46	(10)
- * Club domestic league appearances and goals as of 29 July 2024

Lassi Arttu Valtteri Lintula (born 25 June 1997) is a Finnish professional futsal player who plays for Croatian club MNK Square Dubrovnik in Croatian Prva HMNL and the Finland national futsal team. He represented Finland at the UEFA Futsal Euro 2022, which was their first ever appearance in the final tournament.

== Honours ==
Kampuksen Dynamo

- Futsal-Liiga: 2021, 2022
- Futsal-Liiga Player of the Month: February 2018
