= Vimmerby IF =

Swedish football club

- Full name: Vimmerby Idrottsförening
- Nickname: VIF
- Founded: 1919
- Ground: Vimarvallen; Vimmerby; Sweden
- Capacity: 3,000
- Chairman: Magnus Budo Eriksson
- Head coach: Christer Eriksson
- Coach: Johan Fröberg; Kjell Carlsson
- League: Division 2 Södra Svealand
| Home colours | Away colours |

Vimmerby IF (founded in 1919) is a Swedish football club located in Vimmerby in Kalmar County. VIF won the 2009–10 Swedish Futsal Championship and were Sweden's representative in the 2010–11 UEFA Futsal Cup.

== Background ==
Since their foundation, Vimmerby IF has participated mainly in the middle and lower divisions of the Swedish football league system. The club is currently playing in Division 2 Södra Svealand which is the fourth tier of Swedish football. They play their home matches at the Vimarvallen in Vimmerby.

In autumn 2009, the city council made the exciting decision to build an artificial turf training facility in conjunction with current Ceosvallen. The Arena Ceos Project will be the biggest project since the club was formed in 1919. VIF has worked earnestly for decades to bring about a relocation of the main arena and to get proper winter training opportunities. The municipality's commitment is to build and own the facility and to lease it to Vimmerby IF who will manage the operation of both artificial grass and other green spaces in the Ceosvallen.

Vimmerby IF are affiliated to the Smålands Fotbollförbund.

== Futsal ==
A great achievement for Vimmerby IF was winning the 2009–10 Swedish Futsal Championship. In the final against IFK Skövde who had won the previous 4 championships, VIK came back from 5–2 down with 5 minutes remaining to win 6–5 with a dramatic last minute winner. The club were Sweden's representative in the 2010–11 UEFA Futsal Cup but were knocked out in the preliminary round in a group held at Hafnarfjörður in Iceland. The group comprised Kremlin-Bicêtre United (France), CFE/VDL Groep (Holland), Keflavík ÍF (Iceland) and Vimmerby IF with the winners Kremlin-Bicêtre United progressing into the next round.

== Season to season ==
| Season | Level | Division | Section | Position | Movements |
|---|---|---|---|---|---|
| 1993 | Tier 5 | Division 4 | Småland Nordöstra | 2nd | |
| 1994 | Tier 5 | Division 4 | Småland Nordöstra | 1st | Promoted |
| 1995 | Tier 4 | Division 3 | Nordöstra Götaland | 11th | Relegated |
| 1996 | Tier 5 | Division 4 | Småland Nordöstra | 8th | |
| 1997 | Tier 5 | Division 4 | Småland Nordöstra | 9th | Relegation Playoffs – Relegated |
| 1998 | Tier 6 | Division 5 | | | Promotion Playoffs – Promoted |
| 1999 | Tier 5 | Division 4 | Småland Nordöstra | 2nd | |
| 2000 | Tier 5 | Division 4 | Småland Nordöstra | 2nd | |
| 2001 | Tier 5 | Division 4 | Småland Östra Elit | 5th | |
| 2002 | Tier 5 | Division 4 | Småland Östra Elit | 8th | |
| 2003 | Tier 5 | Division 4 | Småland Östra Elit | 8th | |
| 2004 | Tier 5 | Division 4 | Småland Östra Elit | 10th | |
| 2005 | Tier 5 | Division 4 | Småland Östra Elit | 4th | |
| 2006* | Tier 6 | Division 4 | Småland Norra Elit | 1st | Promoted |
| 2007 | Tier 5 | Division 3 | Nordöstra Götaland | 4th | |
| 2008 | Tier 5 | Division 3 | Nordöstra Götaland | 4th | |
| 2009 | Tier 5 | Division 3 | Nordöstra Götaland | 1st | Promoted |
| 2010 | Tier 4 | Division 2 | Östra Götaland | 6th | |
| 2011 | Tier 4 | Division 2 | Västra Götaland | 2nd | |
| 2012 | Tier 4 | Division 2 | Östra Götaland | 8th | |
| 2013 | Tier 4 | Division 2 | Södra Svealand | 8th | |
| 2014 | Tier 4 | Division 2 | Östra Götaland | 5th | |

== Attendances ==
In recent seasons Vimmerby IFs have had the following average attendances:

| Season | Average attendance | Division / Section | Level |
|---|---|---|---|
| 2006 | Not available | Div Småland Norra Elit | Tier 6 |
| 2007 | 397 | Div 3 Nordöstra Götaland | Tier 5 |
| 2008 | 406 | Div 3 Nordöstra Götaland | Tier 5 |
| 2009 | 480 | Div 3 Nordöstra Götaland | Tier 5 |
| 2010 | 589 | Div 2 Östra Götaland | Tier 4 |

* Attendances are provided in the Publikliga sections of the Svenska Fotbollförbundet website.
