= Nima Kadivar =

Swedish futsal player (born 1994)

Personal information
- Full name: Nima Kadivar
- Date of birth: 23 August 1994 (age 32)
- Place of birth: Gothenburg, Sweden
- Position: Defender

Team information
- Current team: Hammarby IF
- Number: 7

Senior career*
Years	Team	Apps	(Gls)
2017–2020	IFK Göteborg	45	(47)
2021	Örebro Futsal Club	2	(0)
2022–	Hammarby IF	7	(4)
2022-2025	Skofteby IF	35	(17)

International career^{‡}
2017–2025	Sweden (futsal)	44	(13)
- * Club domestic league appearances and goals as of 4 January 2022 ‡ National team caps and goals as of 4 January 2022

Nima Kadivar (born 23 August 1994) is a Swedish professional futsal player who has competed at the highest level of the Swedish Futsal League from 2017 to 2025. Over the course of his career, he has represented IFK Göteborg, Örebro Futsal Club, Hammarby IF, and Skoftebyns IF, earning recognition as one of Sweden’s top futsal talents.

Kadivar also made a impact on the international stage, earning 44 caps for the Swedish national futsal team during this period.

In 2019, his performances earned him a nomination for Swedish Futsal Player of the Year.

== Club career ==
Kadivar joined the futsal team of IFK Göteborg in 2017, competing in the Swedish Futsal League.

In the 2018/2019 season, Kadivar scored 27 goals in 24 appearances, establishing himself as one of the top scorers in the league.

In the 2020 semi-final match against AFC Eskilstuna, Kadivar suffered a serious knee injury that sidelined him for the entire 2020–21 season. During his recovery, he transitioned into a coaching role and became head coach of IFK Göteborg’s women’s futsal team. Under his leadership, the team won the Swedish Championship, defeating local rivals GAIS 3–2 in the final.

In season 2021-2022, after completing his second comeback to professional futsal, Kadivar signed with Hammarby IF Futsal—a move warmly received by fans. “Nima Kadivar klar för Bajen.” He made his long-awaited return to the court in February 2022, playing his first match for Hammarby against IFK Uddevalla, marking a major milestone after a long and determined road back from injury.

Ahead of the 2022/2023 season, Kadivar joined Skofteby IF as a playing manager, combining leadership on and off the court. Under his guidance, the club achieved its best league result in history, reaching the semifinals of the 2024/2025 season.

Despite undergoing four additional knee surgeries since 2022, Kadivar continued to make a remarkable impact on Swedish futsal with his performances on the pitch. At the age of 31, before his final match, he announced his retirement as player from professional futsal, closing his career with an emotional final appearance for the Swedish national team in a match against Greece.

== International career ==
Nima Kadivar made his debut for the Sweden national futsal team on 11 November 2017 in a match against Hungary. He went on to represent Sweden in the Nordic Futsal Cup in 2017, 2018, and 2019, becoming a regular presence in the national squad.

On 30 January 2019, Kadivar scored a key goal in Sweden’s 3–1 victory over Armenia, marking the opening match of their 2020 FIFA Futsal World Cup qualification campaign.From 2019 to 2025, Kadivar earned 44 caps for the national team, scoring 13 goals. His experience, leadership, and winning mentality were consistently praised by his teammates, managers, and fans alike. In the opening match of Sweden’s 2020 FIFA Futsal World Cup qualification campaign, Kadivar scored a crucial goal in a 3–1 victory over Armenia on 30 January 2019, showcasing his impact on the international stage.

Coaching Role with the National Women’s Team

In addition to his playing career, Nima Kadivar took on the role of assistant coach for the Sweden national women’s futsal team in 2023. Drawing on his extensive tactical knowledge and experience as a professional player, Kadivar has played a pivotal role in the development of the team. His understanding of the game, along with his leadership and winning mentality, has made a significant impact on the team’s growth and progress.
