= Finland national futsal team =

Finland
- Shirt badge/Association crest
- Nickname(s): Huuhkajat (The Eagle-Owls)
- Association: Suomen Palloliitto
- Confederation: UEFA
- Head coach: (Italy) Sergio Gargelli
- Captain: Jani Korpela
- Most caps: Risto Salmi (66)
- Top scorer: Panu Autio (41)
- FIFA code: FIN
- FIFA ranking: 33 (24 September 2026)
Home colours	Away colours

First international
- Finland 4–7 Hungary (Helsinki, Finland; October 21, 1998)

Biggest win
- Malta 0–10 Finland (Cottonera, Malta; October 15, 2010)

Biggest defeat
- Spain 13–0 Finland (Madrid, Spain; January 29, 2004)

FIFA World Cup
- Appearances: 0

UEFA Futsal Championship
- Appearances: 1 (First in 2022)
- Best result: Quarter-finals (2022)

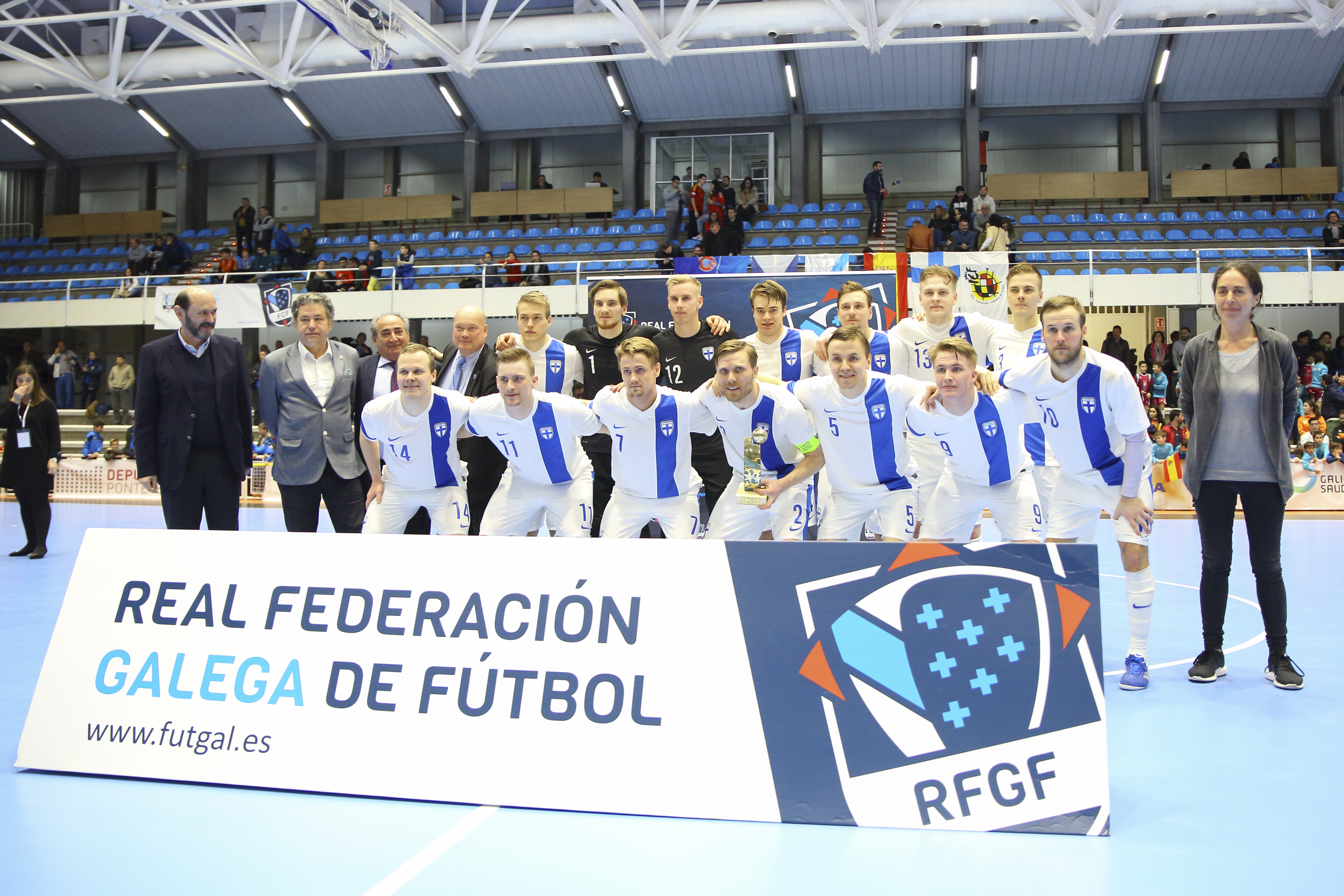
Finland national futsal team 2.4.2018

The Finnish national futsal team represents Finland in international futsal competitions. The team is run under supervision of the Football Association of Finland. It has never qualified for the World Cup. On 29.7.2022 rankings Finland is 18th globally and 11th in Europe.

== History ==
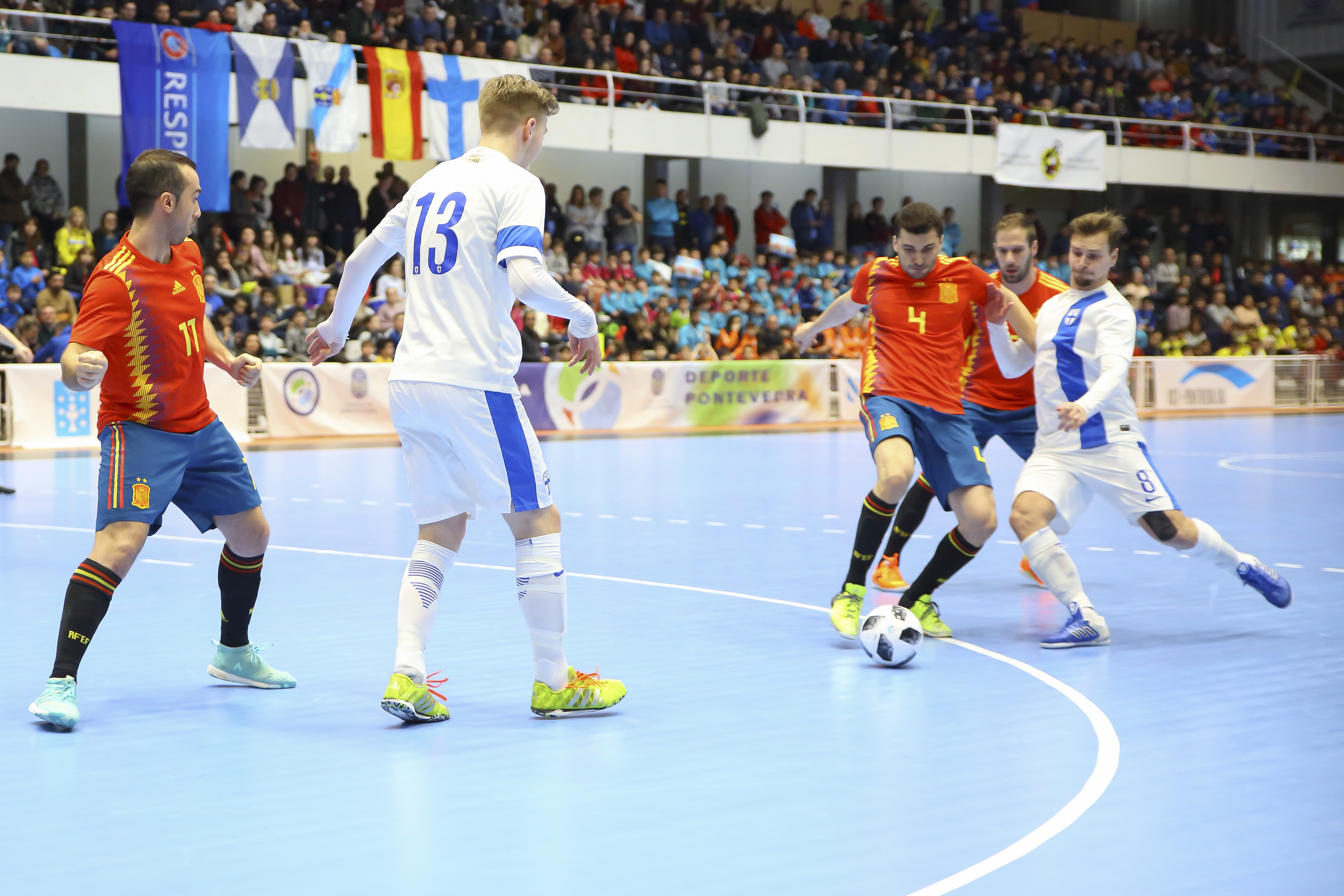
Spain - Finland 2.4.2018

The Finnish national futsal team was formed for the first time in 1994 when Finland participated in the World University Futsal Championship held in Cyprus. The World University Futsal Championship was held in Jyväskylä, Finland two years later. The first official international matches were played on October 21 and 22, 1998 against Hungary. Later that year Finland also participated in the qualifiers for the 1999 UEFA Futsal Championship tournament with futsal national team coach Timo Liekoski, but failed to qualify.

Simo Syrjävaara was selected as national futsal team coach at the end of year 1999. During Syrjävaara's spell, the team has participated twice in FIFA Futsal World Championship qualifiers and three times in UEFA Futsal Championship qualifiers. In these qualifiers, the team won only twice and lost total of 14 times. After Syrjävaara stepped down, rising talent Jouni Pihlaja took over coaching the team from the beginning of year 2005.

== International Competitions ==
=== FIFA Futsal World Cup ===
FIFA Futsal World Cup record									Qualification record						
Year	Round	Pld	W	D	L	GF	GA		Outcome	Pld	W	D	L	GF	GA
(Netherlands) 1989	Did not enter								Did not enter						
(Hong Kong) 1992	Did not enter								Did not enter						
(Spain) 1996	Did not enter								Did not enter						
(Guatemala) 2000	Did not qualify								Group E 5th place	4	0	0	4	7	15
(Chinese Taipei) 2004	Did not qualify								Group 2 3rd place	3	1	0	2	4	18
(Brazil) 2008	Did not qualify								Group 6 3rd place	3	1	0	2	4	10
(Thailand) 2012	Did not qualify								Group D 3rd place	3	1	1	1	4	6
(Colombia) 2016	Did not qualify								Group 3 3rd place	5	2	1	2	12	7
(Lithuania) 2021	Did not qualify								Play-offs	11	5	3	3	38	22
(Uzbekistan) 2024	Did not qualify								Play-offs	12	6	3	3	37	18
(N/A) 2028	TBD								2028	TBD					
Total	0/10	0	0	0	0	0	0	7/10		41	15	8	18	106	96

=== UEFA European Futsal Championship ===
UEFA Futsal Euro record								Qualification record						
Year	Round	Pld	W	D	L	GF	GA	Outcome	Pld	W	D	L	GF	GA
(Spain) 1996	Did not enter							-	-	-	-	-	-	-
(Spain) 1999	Did not qualify							Group C runner up	2	1	0	1	3	13
(Russia) 2001	Did not qualify							Group B 3rd place	3	1	0	2	5	12
(Italy) 2003	Did not qualify							Group B 4th place	3	0	0	3	3	14
(Czech Republic) 2005	Did not qualify							Group D 4th place	3	0	0	3	2	25
(Portugal) 2007	Did not qualify							Group D 4th place	6	2	1	3	19	26
(Hungary) 2010	Did not qualify							Group 6 3rd place	6	3	0	3	15	12
(Croatia) 2012	Did not qualify							Group 2 4th place	6	2	1	3	21	18
(Belgium) 2014	Did not qualify							Group 1 3rd place	3	1	0	2	6	11
(Serbia) 2016	Did not qualify							Group 3 3rd place	6	4	0	2	13	8
(Slovenia) 2018	Did not qualify							Group 4 3rd place	3	1	1	1	10	13
(Netherlands) 2022	Quarterfinals	4	1	1	2	9	13	Group 7 runner up	6	3	1	2	20	18
(Latvia) (Lithuania) (Slovenia) 2026	Did not qualify							Group 2 3rd place	6	2	0	4	16	12
(N/A) 2030	TBD							2030	TBD					
Total	1/13	4	1	1	2	9	13	11/13	47	18	4	25	117	170

=== Nordic Futsal Cup ===
Nordic Futsal Cup record
Year	Round	Position	Pld	W	D	L	GF	GA
2013	Third place	3rd	3	1	0	2	10	10
2014	Winners	1st	3	2	1	0	8	3
2016	Winners	1st	4	4	0	0	16	5
2017	Winners	1st	4	4	0	0	17	6
2018	Winners	1st	4	4	0	0	16	4
2019	Winners	1st	4	4	0	0	25	4
Total	6/6 app.	5 title	22	19	1	2	92	32

=== Baltic Futsal Cup ===
Baltic Futsal Cup record
Year	Round	Position	Pld	W	D	L	GF	GA
2015	Winners	1st	3	2	1	0	9	4

== Players ==
As of 25 August 2023

=== Current squad ===
The following players were called up to the squad for the UEFA 2024 FIFA Futsal World Cup qualification matches against Portugal and Armenia on 16 and 20 September 2023, respectively.

No.	Pos.	Player	Date of birth (age)	Caps	Goals	Club
1	GK	Juha-Matti Savolainen	26 May 1991 (age 35)	105	5	(Football Association of Finland) Kampuksen Dynamo
12	GK	Antti Koivumäki	27 January 1993 (age 33)	87	1	(Italian Football Federation) Lazio C5
20	GK	Kasper Kangas	21 May 1999 (age 27)	20	0	(Football Association of Finland) Akaa Futsal
6	DF	Jukka Kytölä	27 December 1988 (age 37)	135	32	(Football Association of Finland) Kampuksen Dynamo
13	DF	Jani Korpela (captain)	8 July 1997 (age 29)	111	17	(Royal Spanish Football Federation) Inter Movistar
14	DF	Justus Kunnas	4 March 1999 (age 27)	19	7	(Football Association of Finland) Akaa Futsal
16	DF	Vesa Lilja	3 February 1998 (age 28)	13	1	(Football Association of Finland) FC Kemi
2	FW	Henri Alamikkotervo	6 January 2001 (age 25)	25	7	(Royal Spanish Football Federation) Bisontes Castellón
3	FW	Jaakko Alasuutari	2 March 1997 (age 29)	24	2	(Italian Football Federation) Futsal Cesena
4	FW	Tuukka Pikkarainen	7 January 1998 (age 28)	43	8	(Finland) FC Kemi
7	FW	Tero Intala	30 January 1992 (age 34)	17	1	(Football Association of Finland) Akaa Futsal
8	FW	Sergei Korsunov	22 February 1992 (age 34)	107	9	(Polish Football Association) Rekord Bielsko-Biała
10	FW	Miika Hosio	27 June 1989 (age 37)	124	49	(Football Association of Finland) Golden Futsal Team
11	FW	Lassi Lintula	25 June 1997 (age 29)	58	5	(Croatian Football Federation) MNK Square Dubrovnik
15	FW	Olli Pöyliö	11 August 1995 (age 31)	27	1	(Football Association of Finland) Vieska FS
18	FW	Jere Intala	22 February 1994 (age 32)	4	0	(Football Association of Finland) Akaa Futsal
19	FW	Iiro Vanha	19 December 1994 (age 31)	62	12	(Croatian Football Federation) MNK Olmissum

=== Recent call-ups ===
The following players have also been called up to the squad within the last 12 months.

Pos.	Player	Date of birth (age)	Caps	Goals	Club	Latest call-up
^{COV} Player withdrew from the squad due to contracting COVID-19.^{INJ} Player withdrew from the squad due to an injury.^{PRE} Preliminary squad.^{RET} Retired from international futsal.

== Season 2018-2019 ==
Date	Teams		Venue	Result	Notes	Finland goalscorers
14.4.2019	Finland	Spain	Vantaa, Finland	X - X		
13.4.2019	Finland	Spain	Tampere, Finland	X - X		
2.2.2019	Finland	Moldova	Ciorescu, Moldova	1-2 (0-1)	WC 2020 Qualifications	Jyrkiäinen
31.1.2019	Wales	Finland	Ciorescu, Moldova	0-7 (0-2)	WC 2020 Qualifications	Kylmälä, Autio, Korpela, Korsunov, Hosio, J. Kytölä, Jyrkiäinen
30.1.2019	Finland	Northern Ireland	Ciorescu, Moldova	9-1 (4-1)	WC 2020 Qualifications	Korpela x2, Junno, Korsunov, Autio, J.Kytölä x2, Hosio
8.12.2018	Denmark	Finland	Ringkøbing-Skjern, Denmark	1-3 (1-0)	Nordic Futsal Cup	J.Kytölä x2, Autio
7.12.2018	Norway	Finland	Ringkøbing-Skjern, Denmark	0-2 (0-0)	Nordic Futsal Cup	Teittinen, Junno
5.12.2018	Sweden	Finland	Ringkøbing-Skjern, Denmark	5-2 (4-1)	Nordic Futsal Cup	M.Kytölä, Hosio, Teittinen, J.Kytölä, Autio
4.12.2018	Finland	Greenland	Ringkøbing-Skjern, Denmark	6-1 (4-1)	Nordic Futsal Cup	Korsunov, Jyrkiäinen x2, J.Kytölä, Junno, Autio
28.10.2018	Czech Republic	Finland	Jyväskylä, Finland	4-1		M.Kytölä
27.10.2018	Finland	Denmark	Jyväskylä, Finland	3-2		Autio x2, Korsunov
26.10.2018	Finland	Russia	Jyväskylä, Finland	2-5		Jyrkiäinen, M.Kytölä

== Futsal national team games 2010-11 ==
Date	Venue	Home team	Visiting team	Result	Goals
14.10.2010	Cottonera	Malta	Finland	0-7 (0-1)	Salmi, Autio, Torvinen 2, Reinikka, Juvonen, Modig
15.10.2010	Cottonera	Malta	Finland	0-10 (0-5)	Salmi 3, Autio 2, Terho 3, Laurikainen, Kytölä
13.12.2010	Tampere	Finland	(Republic of Ireland) Ireland	5-0 (3-0)	Henriksson 2, Terho, Autio, Own goal
14.12.2010	Jyväskylä	Finland	(Republic of Ireland) Ireland	8-2 (5-0)	Kytölä 2, Autio 3, Salmi, Torvinen, Own goal
10.1.2011	Miskolc	Hungary	Finland	3-1 (1-1)	Salmi
11.1.2011	Gyöngyös	Hungary	Finland	6-1 (0-1)	Teittinen
20.1.2011	Tampere	Finland	Albania	9-0 (5-0)	Reinikka, Salmi, Own goal, Laurikainen, Teittinen, Autio 3, Kytölä
22.1.2011	Tampere	Finland	San Marino	7-0 (1-0)	Autio 2, Kytölä, Terho, Teittinen 2, Torvinen
23.1.2011	Tampere	Cyprus	Finland	2-2 (1-2)	Lind 2
24.2.2011	Rotterdam	Russia	Finland	5-1	Lindgren
25.2.2011	Rotterdam	Netherlands	Finland	5-2	Autio, Own goal
27.2.2011	Rotterdam	Finland	Serbia	0-6	
