= Zhubi River =

- Location of mouth in Hainan
- Native name: 珠碧江 (Chinese)

Location
- Country: Hainan, China
- County: Baisha Li Autonomous County

Physical characteristics
- Mouth
  - coordinates: 19°30′37″N 108°56′01″E
- Length: 84 kilometers

The Zhubi River (Chinese: 珠碧江), also known as Zhubi Jiang, is a river in the west of Hainan Island of China. Its source section is called Heshui River (合水河). The river originates in Nangao Ridge (南高岭) in the middle of Baisha Li Autonomous County, flows through Changjiang County, and finally merges into Gulf of Tonkin at Haitou Port (海头港).

Zhubi River is 84 kilometers long, with a watershed area of 657.7 square kilometers and an average annual runoff of 640 million cubic meters. It is one of the three major rivers in Hainan. In the middle reaches of the river, the Bangxi Provincial Nature Reserve (邦溪省级自然保护区) has been established to protect the rare species of Hainan Eld's deer (海南坡鹿).
