= Hammarby IF Futsal =

Swedish futsal club

- Full name: Hammarby IF Fotbollförening
- Nickname: Bajen
- Founded: 20 May 2016; 10 years ago
- Ground: Eriksdalshallen, Stockholm
- Capacity: 2,600
- Chairman: Mattias Fri
- Manager: Daniel Blanco
- League: Swedish Futsal League
- 2020–21: Swedish Futsal League 2nd / W (champions)
- Website: http://www.hammarbyfotboll.se/?team=Dam
Home colours	Away colours

Hammarby IF Futsal is a Swedish futsal team from Stockholm, part of the football club Hammarby IF Fotbollförening.

Originally Hammarby IF started to play five-a-side in the 1990s, fielding the players from their men's football team, and won the first ever official Swedish Futsal Championship in 1994.

In 2016, the club decided to start an organised futsal team. Competing in the domestic first tier, Swedish Futsal League, Hammarby has won the league twice, in 2020 and 2021.

== History ==
=== Indoor football and five-a-side ===
On 3 January 1940, Hammarby IF took part in the first ever indoor football match in Stockholm, facing city rivals Djurgårdens IF.

Between 1977 and 1990, Hammarby IF's senior football team competed in the yearly five-a-side tournament Nackas Minne, named in honor of the late footballer Lennart "Nacka" Skoglund. Facing Stockholm rivals AIK and Djurgården, numerous international football clubs where also invited each year. The tournament resurfaced for two years in 2003 and 2004, and Hammarby won nine of the 16 editions that were held in total.

In 1994, Hammarby IF won the first official Swedish Futsal Championship, by then played with five-a-side rules, held by the Swedish Football Association, fielding players from their men's football team.

=== Modern futsal team ===
On 20 May 2016, Hammarby IF decided to establish a men's senior futsal team, recruiting several ex-footballers that had played for the club, such as Max von Schlebrügge and José Monteiro, combined with futsal players. The team won the Swedish second tier, Division 1 Södra Svealand, during their inaugural season and secured a promotion to the Swedish Futsal League.

In 2018–19, the side finished second in the Swedish Futsal League behind IFK Uddevalla, and won the silver medal since no play-off was held. In 2019–20, Hammarby IF won the Swedish championship through a 2–1 final win against IFK Göteborg. In 2020–21, the club defended their title through a win on penalties (4–4 after full time) against Örebro SK in the final. Following the side's domestic success, key players Liridon Makolli, Sebastian Holmqvist, Alan Arslan, Tolga Ayranci and Gabriel Diaz have been called up to the Sweden national futsal team.

On 20 May 2021, it was announced that Hammarby IF would establish a futsal women's team, starting in the second tier Division 1.

== European records ==
Hammarby IF made their debut in European competitions in the 2020–21 UEFA Futsal Champions League, but was eliminated in the preliminary round by Lithuanian club Vytis. In the 2021–22 UEFA Futsal Champions League, the club became one of the first ever Swedish clubs to reach the main round of the tournament, after winning their group in the preliminary round, eliminating Viimsi from Estonia, Gentofte from Denmark and Sparta Belfast from Northern Ireland in the process.

== Squad ==
=== First team ===
As of 21 December 2024

Note: Flags indicate national team as defined under FIFA eligibility rules; some limited exceptions apply. Players may hold more than one non-FIFA nationality.

No.	Pos.	Nation	Player
3	Goalkeeper	SWE	Erik Linder
4	Outfield player	SWE	Alexander Zachariadis Sandback
5	Goalkeeper	SWE	Patrick Gaete Ortega
7	Outfield player	SWE	Sayyed Amin Mossavi
9	Outfield player	SWE	Adnan Cirak
10	Outfield player	SWE	Liridon Makolli
13	Outfield player	SWE	Muzaffer Arpacik
14	Outfield player	SWE	Rabiah Ferchichi
15	Outfield player	SWE	Andrej Jekic
17	Outfield player	SWE	Shams Rahimi
18	Outfield player	SWE	Ahmed Rashid
19	Outfield player	SWE	David Vasquez Cabrera
20	Outfield player	SWE	Omar Ghachem
91	Pivot	SWE	Danijel Nikolla
—	Outfield player	SWE	Shahriyar Mumand
—	Outfield player	SWE	Javier Donado Gómez
—	Outfield player	SWE	Solaiman Soltani
—	Outfield player	SWE	Sargon Bartuma

== Honours ==
- Swedish Futsal Championship
  - Winners (1): 1994
- Swedish Futsal League
  - Winners (2): 2019–20, 2020–21
    - Runners-up (1): 2018–19
