= 2014 Nordic Futsal Cup =

Tournament details
- Host country: Finland
- Dates: 4–7 December 2014
- Teams: 4 (from 1 confederation)
- Venue(s): 2 (in 2 host cities)

Final positions
- Champions: Finland (1st title)
- Runners-up: Norway
- Third place: Sweden
- Fourth place: Denmark

Tournament statistics
- Matches played: 6
- Goals scored: 25 (4.17 per match)
- Attendance: 1,392 (232 per match)
- Top scorer(s): (Norway) Stian Sortevik (Finland) Panu Autio (3 goals)

The 2014 Nordic Futsal Cup was held from December 4 to 7, 2014 in Finland. Finland won the tournament.

== Standings ==
Team	Pld	W	D	L	GF	GA	GD	Pts
Finland	3	2	1	0	8	3	+5	7
Norway	3	1	1	1	8	5	+3	4
Sweden	3	0	2	1	6	10	−4	2
Denmark	3	0	2	1	3	7	−4	2

Source: Svenskfotboll.se

== Matches ==
4 December 2014
16:30

Norway	3–3	Sweden
Moen 17'; Ravlo 25'; Sortevik 38'	Report	Lajaab 7' (o.g.); Ćatović 28'; Etèus 40'

Martinhalli, Hyvinkää
Attendance: 85
4 December 2014
19:00

Finland	1–1	Denmark
Kytölä 23'	Report	Lahtinen 14' (o.g.)

Martinhalli, Hyvinkää
Attendance: 260

5 December 2014
16:30

Norway	4–0	Denmark
Ravlo 4'; Sortevik 16', 29'; Nordtun 33'	Report

Pirkkahalli, Tampere
Attendance: 102
5 December 2014
19:00

Sweden	1–5	Finland
Ladan 8'	Report	Jyrkiäinen 9'; Autio 17'; Teittinen 19'; Hosio 26'; Kytölä 39'

Pirkkahalli, Tampere
Attendance: 531

7 December 2014
12:00

Denmark	2–2	Sweden
Jørgensen 20'; Jensen 39'	Report	Roxström 20'; Burda 30'

Martinhalli, Hyvinkää
Attendance: 72
7 December 2014
14:30

Finland	2-1	Norway
Autio 32', 33'	Report	El-masrouri 26'

Martinhalli, Hyvinkää
Attendance: 342

== Goalscorers ==
3 goals

- (Norway) Stian Sortevik
- (Finland) Panu Autio

2 goals

- (Finland) Jukka Kytölä
- (Norway) Morten Ravlo

1 goal

- (Finland) Juhana Jyrkiäinen
- (Finland) Antti Teittinen
- (Finland) Miika Hosio
- (Denmark) Kevin Jørgensen
- (Denmark) Jim Bothmann Jensen
- (Norway) Cristopher Moen
- (Norway) Magnar Nordtun
- (Norway) Mounir El-masrouri
- (Sweden) Patrik Burda
- (Sweden) Admir Ćatović
- (Sweden) Mathias Etèus
- (Sweden) Nikola Ladan
- (Sweden) Johan Roxström

Own goals

- (Finland) Tomi Lahtinen (vs. Denmark)
- (Norway) Abdurahim Lajaab (vs. Sweden)

== Awards ==
2014 Nordic Futsal Cup

Finland
First title

- Most Valuable Player
- Top Scorer
  - (Norway) Stian Sortevik (3 goals)
  - (Finland) Panu Autio (3 goals)
- Fair-Play Award
