= Mentor Zhubi =

Futsal player and footballer (born 1984)

Personal information
- Date of birth: 1 May 1984 (age 42)
- Place of birth: Pristina, Yugoslavia
- Height: 1.78 m (5 ft 10 in)
- Positions: Midfielder; forward

Youth career
- 1992–1993: Sibräcka GoIF
- 1994: Oddevold
- 1995–2000: Eds FF
- 2001–2002: Örgryte IS

Senior career*
Years	Team	Apps	(Gls)
2003–2008	Örgryte IS	55	(5)
2005	→ Västra Frölunda IF (loan)	18	(0)
2006	→ Leiknir Reykjavík (loan)	18	(2)
2009	Oddevold		
2010	Slavoj Vyšehrad		
2011	Oddevold	13	(3)
2011	Assyriska	10	(2)
2012	Oddevold	20	(1)
2013–2015	Qviding	68	(6)
2016–2017	Västra Frölunda	18	(1)

International career
2012–	Sweden (Futsal)	10	(3)
- * Club domestic league appearances and goals

Mentor Zhubi (born 1 May 1984) is a futsal player and former professional footballer. Born in Yugoslavia, he has represented the Sweden national futsal team internationally.

== Football ==
Zhubi played for Västra Frölunda in the Swedish Division 3.

== Futsal ==
Zhubi is also a Futsal player for Gothenburg team FC Ibra and the Sweden national team. In 2012 FC Ibra won the Swedish Futsal Championship and Mentor Zhubi was chosen Player of the Year.

He made his international futsal debut for Sweden on 11 December 2012 against France.

== Personal life ==
Zhubi is the older brother of Åtvidabergs FF's Petrit Zhubi.

== Honors ==
=== Futsal ===
FC Ibra

- Swedish Futsal Champion: 2012

Individual

- Player of the year: 2012
