= Swedish Futsal Championship =

- Founded: 2003
- Country: Sweden
- Confederation: UEFA
- Number of clubs: 4 (Final Four)
- Level on pyramid: 1
- International cup: UEFA Futsal Cup
- Current champions: IFK Göteborg Futsal (2016)
- Most championships: Skövde AIK (5)
- Website: www.svenskfotboll.se
- Current: Current Season at UEFA.com

The Swedish Futsal Championship (SM i futsal) is the premier futsal competition in Sweden and is organised by the Svenska Fotbollförbundet.

The tournament previously consisted of several regional tournaments, but since the season 2014/15 the Swedish Futsal League acts as the qualification round. The top four teams play the Final Four to determine the champion.

The official championship was played for the first time in 2003/04.

== Champions by year ==
Season	Champions
1994	Hammarby IF
1996	Malmö FF
1997	Malmö FF
1998	Malmö FF
1999	Trelleborgs FF
2000	IF Sylvia
2001	Eskilstuna City FK
2002	Degerfors IF
2003	Degerfors IF
2004	Degerfors IF
2005	Skövde AIK
2006	Skövde AIK
2007	Skövde AIK
2008	Skövde AIK
2009	Skövde AIK
2010	Vimmerby IF
2011	Falcao FC Stockholm
2012	FC Ibra
2013	Göteborg Futsal Club
2014	Malmö City FC Futsal
2015	Göteborg Futsal Club
2016	IFK Göteborg Futsal
