= 2013 Nordic Futsal Cup =

Tournament details
- Host country: Denmark
- Dates: 4–7 December 2013
- Teams: 4 (from 1 confederation)
- Venue: PriceRunner Arena

Final positions
- Champions: Sweden (1st title)
- Runners-up: Norway
- Third place: Finland
- Fourth place: Denmark

Tournament statistics
- Matches played: 6
- Goals scored: 43 (7.17 per match)
- Top scorer: (Denmark) Kevin Jørgensen (6 goals)

The 2013 Nordic Futsal Cup was held from December 4 to 7, 2013 in Nykøbing Falster, Denmark. Sweden won the tournament.

== Final standings ==
Team	Pld	W	D	L	GF	GA	GD	Pts
Sweden	3	2	0	1	12	8	+4	6
Norway	3	2	0	1	10	11	−1	6
Finland	3	1	0	2	10	10	0	3
Denmark	3	1	0	2	11	14	−3	3

Source: Svenskfotboll.se

== Matches ==
4 December 2013
19:00

Norway	3–2	Finland
Ovesen 3'; Laajab 15'; Dønnem 29'		Kytölä 16'; Hosio 22'

PriceRunner Arena, Nykøbing Falster
4 December 2013
21:00

Denmark	4–3	Sweden
Jørgensen 14'; Lucht 17'; Petersen 25'; Jensen 33'		Mönell 5'; Legiec 37'; Pahlevan 39'

PriceRunner Arena, Nykøbing Falster
Attendance: 300

6 December 2013
19:00

Sweden	4–3	Finland
Legiec 19'; S. Abraham 25', 29'; Etéus 32'		Autio 10'; Teittinen 19'; Hosio 33'

PriceRunner Arena, Nykøbing Falster
Attendance: 220
6 December 2013
21:00

Denmark	4–6	Norway
Bonde 17', 27'; Jørgensen 26', 37'		Laajab 9'; Moen 14', 19'; Ravlo 19'; Sortevik 22'; Skaga 26'

PriceRunner Arena, Nykøbing Falster
Attendance: 700

7 December 2013
14:00

Norway	1–5	Sweden
Sæther 17'		Mönell 12'; Etéus 29'; Chekroun 30'; Legiec 36', 39'

PriceRunner Arena, Nykøbing Falster
Attendance: 139
7 December 2013
16:00

Finland	5–3	Denmark
Kytölä 23', 33'; Hosio 25'; Stenholm 36'; Autio 39'		Jørgensen 25', 27', 38'

PriceRunner Arena, Nykøbing Falster
Attendance: 600

== Goalscorers ==
6 goals

- (Denmark) Kevin Jørgensen

4 goals

- (Sweden) Kristian Legiec

3 goals

- (Finland) Miika Hosio
- (Finland) Mikko Kytölä

2 goals

- (Denmark) Jakob Bonde
- (Finland) Panu Autio
- (Norway) Abdurahim Laajab
- (Norway) Christopher Moen
- (Sweden) Sargon Abraham
- (Sweden) Mathias Etéus
- (Sweden) Dan Mönell

1 goal

- (Denmark) Sebastian Jensen
- (Denmark) Rasmus Lucht
- (Denmark) Rasmus Petersen
- (Finland) Niko Stenholm
- (Finland) Antti Teittinen
- (Norway) Eirik Valla Dønnem
- (Norway) Kim Rune Ovesen
- (Norway) Morten Ravlo
- (Norway) Erlend Skaga
- (Norway) Stian Sortevik
- (Norway) Thomas Sæther
- (Sweden) Simon Chekroun
- (Sweden) Pejman Pahlevan

== Awards ==
2013 Nordic Futsal Cup

Sweden
First title

- Most Valuable Player
- Top Scorer
  - (Denmark) Kevin Jørgensen (6 goals)
- Fair-Play Award
