= Arena Skövde =

Sports venue in Skövde, Sweden

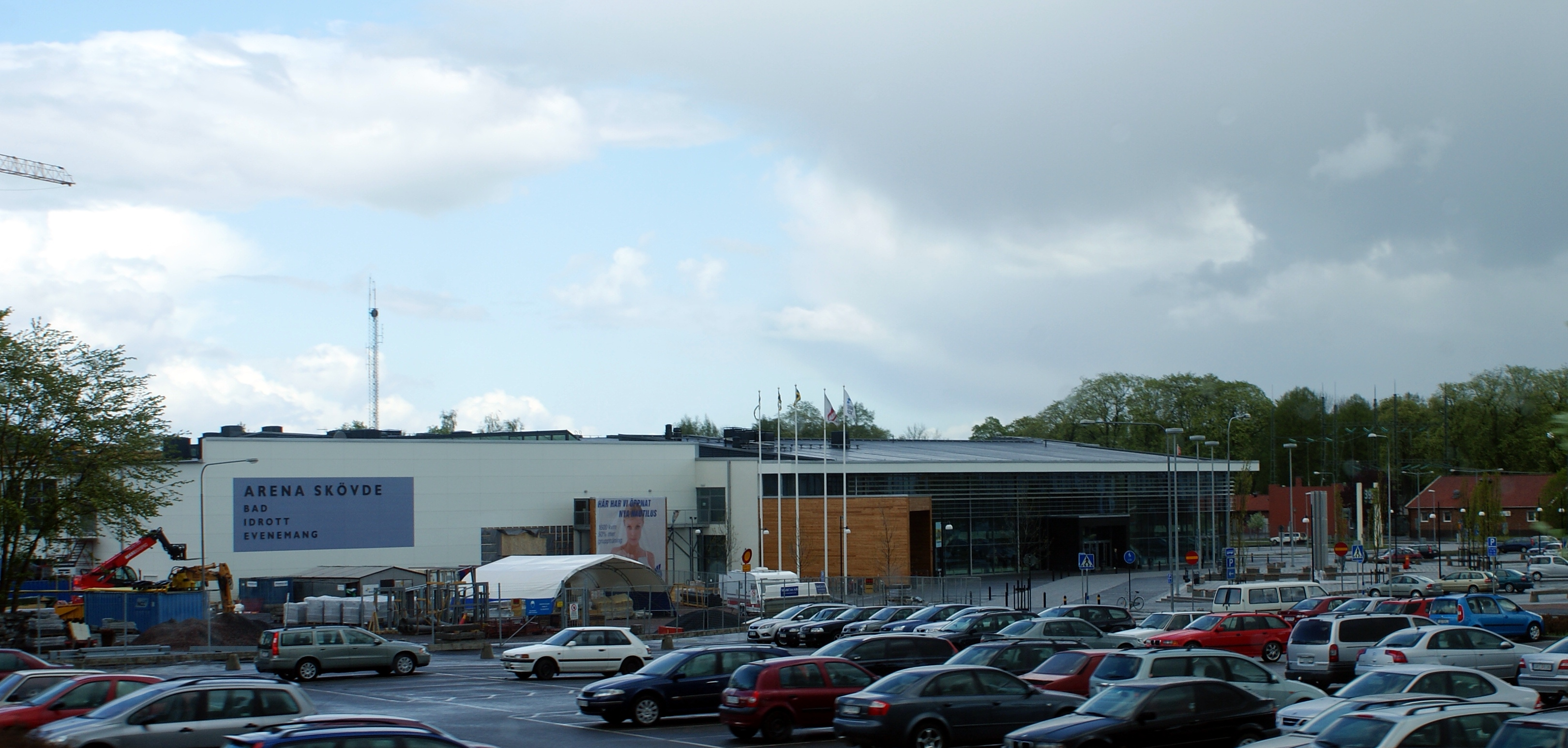
- Interactive map of Arena Skövde
- Location: Skövde, Sweden
- Coordinates: 58.393858°N 13.839017°E
- Operator: Skövde kommun
- Capacity: 2,400

Construction
- Opened: 2001
- Renovated: 1996
- Expanded: December 2009

Tenants
- Skövde HF; IFK Skövde

Skövde Arena is a building for rehabilitation, fitness, gym, massage and public events in Skövde, Sweden. It has a capacity for 2,400 spectators during sport events.
