= Petrit Zhubi =

Swedish footballer

Personal information
- Full name: Petrit Zhubi
- Date of birth: 8 May 1988 (age 38)
- Place of birth: Sweden
- Height: 1.72 m (5 ft 8 in)
- Position: Midfielder

Youth career
- Eds FF

Senior career*
Years	Team	Apps	(Gls)
2006–2010	IK Oddevold	63	(16)
2010–2011	FC Trollhättan	40	(10)
2012–2013	Åtvidabergs FF	36	(3)
2014–2015	GAIS	28	(4)
2015	Nest-Sotra	8	(2)
2016–2017	Lysekloster	11	(5)
2017	IFK Uddevalla	15	(9)
2017–2018	IK Oddevold	31	(2)
2019–2020	Västra Frölunda IF	25	(13)
- * Club domestic league appearances and goals as of 23 June 2023

Petrit Zhubi (born 8 May 1988) is a Swedish footballer of Kosovar Albanian descent who last played for Västra Frölunda IF as a midfielder.

His older brother, Mentor Zhubi, is a former footballer.
