= Swedish Futsal League =

- Founded: 2014
- Country: Sweden
- Confederation: UEFA
- Number of clubs: 12
- Level on pyramid: 1
- Relegation to: Division 1
- International cup: UEFA Futsal Champions League
- Current champions: Hammarby IF (2020–21)
- Most championships: IFK Uddevalla (3)
- Website: https://www.svenskafutsalligan.se/

Svenska Futsalligan (English: the Swedish Futsal League, also known as SFL) is a Swedish league for men's futsal clubs. It was founded in 2014 and is the top flight of the domestic futsal league system. Seasons run from October to March, with the 12 clubs all meeting each other twice, before the best eight teams compete in a play-off to decide the Swedish champion.

== History and format ==
The Swedish Football Association founded a five-a-side football championship in 1994. It was not until ten years later, in 2005, that the first competition was played with official futsal rules, but it consisted of several regional tournaments. In 2014, the Swedish Football Association bought the rights to Svenska Futsalligan, which had been started in 2006 as a private league.

The first official edition of Svenska Futsalligan was held in 2014–15, with 16 teams split in two geographically based groups, where the four overall top teams went on to compete in a play-off. In 2018–19, the league was re-structured into a nationwide league of 14 teams, although no play-off was held. From 2019–20 and onwards, Svenska Futsalligan has been played with 12 clubs, where the eight best teams compete in a play-off to decide the Swedish champion.

== Clubs ==
A total of 26 clubs have played in Svenska Futsalligan. Seven clubs has been members of the league for every season since its inception in 2014, although two of them have changed names since.

The following 12 clubs are competing in Svenska Futsalligan during the 2020–21 season:

| Club | Seasons | Titles | Last title |
|---|---|---|---|
| AFC Eskilstuna | 2 | 0 | —N/a |
| Borås AIK | 7 | 0 | —N/a |
| Hammarby IF | 4 | 2 | 2020–21 |
| IFK Göteborg (Note: Club was known as Göteborg Futsal Club before 2015.) | 7 | 2 | 2015–16 |
| Uddevalla Futsal Club (Note: Club was known as IFK Uddevalla Futsal before 2022/23 season.) | 7 | 3 | 2018–19 |
| Libertà Futsal Club | 1 | 0 | —N/a |
| Norrköping Futsal Klubb | 6 | 0 | —N/a |
| Skoftebyns IF | 7 | 0 | —N/a |
| Strängnäs Futsal Club | 3 | 0 | —N/a |
| Torslanda IK (Note: Club was known as Avenyn United FC before 2016.) | 7 | 0 | —N/a |
| Örebro Futsal Club | 7 | 0 | —N/a |
| Örebro SK (Note: Club was known as Spartak Örebro Futsal Club before 2016.) | 7 | 0 | —N/a |

== Previous winners ==
Since its inception, three clubs has won Svenska Futsalligan and been crowned Swedish champions.

| Season | Winner | Runner-up |
|---|---|---|
| 2014–15 | Göteborg Futsal Club (1) | IFK Uddevalla |
| 2015–16 | IFK Göteborg (2) | IFK Uddevalla |
| 2016–17 | IFK Uddevalla (1) | Borås AIK |
| 2017–18 | IFK Uddevalla (2) | Örebro Futsal Club |
| 2018–19 | IFK Uddevalla (3) | Hammarby IF |
| 2019–20 | Hammarby IF (1) | IFK Göteborg |
| 2020–21 | Hammarby IF (2) | Örebro SK |
