= 2015 Baltic Futsal Cup =

Futsal competition among the national teams of Baltic countries

Tournament details
- Host country: Estonia
- Dates: 27–29 November 2015
- Teams: 4 (from 1 confederation)
- Venue: 1 (in 1 host city)

Final positions
- Champions: Finland (1st title)
- Runners-up: Latvia
- Third place: Estonia
- Fourth place: Lithuania

Tournament statistics
- Matches played: 6
- Goals scored: 36 (6 per match)
- Top scorer: (Latvia) Maksims Seņs (8 goals)

The 2015 Baltic Futsal Cup was held from November 27 to 29, 2015 in Kiili Spordihall, Kiili, Estonia.

== Standings ==
Team	Pld	W	D	L	GF	GA	GD	Pts
Finland	3	2	1	0	9	4	+5	7
Latvia	3	1	1	1	11	9	+2	4
Estonia	3	1	0	2	5	11	−6	3
Lithuania	3	1	0	2	11	12	−1	3

Source: Futsal Planet

== Matches ==
27 November 2015	Latvia	3–3	Finland	Kiili
17:45 (UTC+2)	Maksims Seņs 12', 33'; Andrejs Aleksejevs 19'	Report Report	Joni Pakola 5'; Juhana Jyrkiäinen 22'; Mikko Kytölä 26'	Stadium: Kiili Spordihall; Attendance: 56; Referee: Grigori Ošomkov (Lithuania)

27 November 2015	Estonia	5–4	Lithuania	Kiili
20:00 (UTC+2)	Robert Veskimäe 19'; Kristjan Paapsi 24'; Jevgeni Merkurjev 29'; Rasmus Munskind 30'; Vladislav Tšurilkin 39'	Report	Arsenij Buinicki 27'; Maksim Aleksejev 28' (o.g.); Justinas Zagurskas 32'; Ramūnas Radavičius 33'	Stadium: Kiili Spordihall; Attendance: 187; Referee: Olli Niemelä (Finland)

28 November 2015	Finland	5–1	Lithuania	Kiili
15:30 (UTC+2)	Mikko Kytölä 2', 9', 32'; Miika Hosio 31', 39'	Report	Evaldas Kugys 15'	Stadium: Kiili Spordihall; Attendance: 83; Referee: Ingus Puriņš (Latvia)

28 November 2015	Estonia	0–6	Latvia	Kiili
18:00 (UTC+2)		Report	Maksims Seņs 2', 7', 12', 27'; Konstantins Zabarovskis 6'; Igors Dacko 6'	Stadium: Kiili Spordihall; Attendance: 204; Referee: Kirill Naishouler (Finland)

29 November 2015	Latvia	2–6	Lithuania	Kiili
15:30 (UTC+2)	Maksims Seņs 35', 37'	Report	Rolandas Leščius 13'; Martin Moroz 19'; Ramūnas Radavičius 26'; Arsenij Buinickij 27'; Paulius Sakalis 34'; Mindaugas Labuckas 35'	Stadium: Kiili Spordihall; Referee: Olli Niemelä (Finland)

29 November 2015	Estonia	0–1	Finland	Kiili
18:00 (UTC+2)		Report	Panu Autio 11'	Stadium: Kiili Spordihall; Referee: Kaspars Kivlišs (Latvia)

== Goalscorers ==
8 goals

- (Latvia) Maksims Seņs

3 goals

- (Finland) Mikko Kytölä

2 goals

- (Lithuania) Ramūnas Radavičius
- (Finland) Miika Hosio
- (Lithuania) Arsenij Buinickij

1 goal

- (Lithuania) Mindaugas Labuckas
- (Lithuania) Paulius Sakalis
- (Lithuania) Evaldas Kugys
- (Lithuania) Rolandas Leščius
- (Lithuania) Martin Moroz
- (Lithuania) Justinas Zagurskas
- (Estonia) Robert Veskimäe
- (Estonia) Jevgeni Merkurjev
- (Estonia) Rasmus Munskind
- (Estonia) Kristjan Paapsi
- (Estonia) Vladislav Tšurilkin
- (Latvia) Andrejs Aleksejevs
- (Finland) Panu Autio
- (Finland) Joni Pakola
- (Finland) Mikko Kytölä
- (Finland) Juhana Jyrkiäinen
- (Latvia) Konstantins Zabarovskis
- (Latvia) Igors Dacko

Own goals

- (Estonia) Maksim Aleksejev (vs. Lithuania)

== Awards ==
2015 Baltic Futsal Cup

Finland
First title

- Top Scorer
  - (Latvia) Germans Matjušenko (8 goals)
