= 2008 Baltic Futsal Cup =

Futsal competition among the national teams of Baltic countries

Tournament details
- Host country: Latvia
- Dates: 26–28 December 2008
- Teams: 3 (from 1 confederation)
- Venue(s): 1 (in 1 host city)

Final positions
- Champions: Latvia (1st title)
- Runners-up: Lithuania
- Third place: Estonia

Tournament statistics
- Matches played: 3
- Goals scored: 25 (8.33 per match)

The 2008 Baltic Futsal Cup was held from December 26 to 28, 2008 in Latvia. Latvia won the tournament

== Standings ==
Team	Pld	W	D	L	GF	GA	GD	Pts
Latvia	2	2	0	0	17	1	+16	6
Lithuania	2	1	0	1	7	5	+2	3
Estonia	2	0	0	2	1	19	−18	0

== Matches ==
26 December 2008

Latvia	13–0	Estonia

Ogres sporta hall, Ogre

27 December 2008

Estonia	1–6	Lithuania

Ogres sporta hall, Ogre

28 December 2008

Latvia	4–1	Lithuania

Ogres sporta hall, Ogre

== Awards ==
2008 Baltic Futsal Cup

Latvia
First title
