= 2013 Baltic Futsal Cup =

Futsal competition among the national teams of Baltic countries

Tournament details
- Host country: Latvia
- Dates: 6–8 December 2013
- Teams: 3 (from 1 confederation)
- Venue(s): 1 (in 1 host city)

Final positions
- Champions: Latvia (3rd title)
- Runners-up: Lithuania
- Third place: Estonia

Tournament statistics
- Matches played: 3
- Goals scored: 17 (5.67 per match)

The 2013 Baltic Futsal Cup was held from December 6 to 8, 2013 in Latvia. Latvia won the tournament.

== Standings ==
Team	Pld	W	D	L	GF	GA	GD	Pts
Latvia	2	1	1	0	9	5	+4	4
Lithuania	2	1	0	1	2	5	−3	3
Estonia	2	0	1	1	6	7	−1	1

== Matches ==
6 December 2013
19:00

Latvia	5–5	Estonia

Ogres sporta hall, Ogre

7 December 2014
16:00

Lithuania	2–1	Estonia

Ogres sporta hall, Ogre

8 December 2014
14:00

Latvia	4–0	Lithuania

Ogres sporta hall, Ogre

== Awards ==
2013 Baltic Futsal Cup

Latvia
Third title

Maksims Seņs 5 goals. MVP Maksims Seņs
