= Baltic Futsal Cup =

Futsal competition among the national teams from Baltic countries

- Founded: 2008
- Region: Baltic (UEFA)
- Teams: 3/4
- Current champions: Lithuania (2021)
- Most championships: Latvia (7 titles)

The Baltic Futsal Cup is a Futsal competition among the national teams of the Baltic countries. The competition is hosted by the UEFA.

Not to be confused with club Baltic Futsal League, a competition contested by clubs of the Baltic countries.

== History ==
In 2015 Finland was invited to the tournament. In 2023 a joint Nordic Futsal Cup and Baltic Futsal Cup tournament was held, called Baltic–Nordic Futsal Cup.

== Summary ==
| Year | Host | Winner | Runner-up | Third place | Other places |
|---|---|---|---|---|---|
| 2008 | Latvia (Ogre) | Latvia | Lithuania | Estonia | |
| 2010 | Latvia (Ogre/Riga) | Latvia | Lithuania | Estonia | |
| 2013 | Latvia (Ogre) | Latvia | Lithuania | Estonia | |
| 2014 | Lithuania (Kėdainiai) | Latvia | Lithuania | Estonia | |
| 2015 | Estonia (Kiili) | Finland | Latvia | Estonia | Lithuania |
| 2016 | Latvia (Jelgava) | Latvia | Lithuania | Estonia | |
| 2017 | Lithuania (Šiauliai) | Lithuania | Latvia | Estonia | |
| 2019 | Estonia (Raasiku) | Latvia | Lithuania | Estonia | |
| 2021 | Latvia (Riga/Salaspils) | Lithuania | Latvia | Estonia | |
| 2023 (Note: Baltic–Nordic Futsal Cup) | Denmark (Hjørring) | Denmark | Latvia | Norway | 4. Lithuania; 5. Estonia; 6. Greenland |

== Medal table ==
Medal table after the 2021 tournament

| Rank | Nation | Gold | Silver | Bronze | Total |
|---|---|---|---|---|---|
| 1 | Latvia | 6 | 3 | 0 | 9 |
| 2 | Lithuania | 2 | 6 | 0 | 8 |
| 3 | Finland | 1 | 0 | 0 | 1 |
| 4 | Estonia | 0 | 0 | 9 | 9 |
| Totals (4 entries) | | 9 | 9 | 9 | 27 |

== General statistics ==
As of 2017.

| Pos | Team | Part | Pld | W | D | L | GF | GA | Dif | Pts |
|---|---|---|---|---|---|---|---|---|---|---|
| 1 | Latvia | 7 | 15 | 11 | 2 | 2 | 65 | 26 | +39 | 35 |
| 2 | Lithuania | 7 | 15 | 6 | 2 | 7 | 41 | 42 | -1 | 20 |
| 3 | Finland | 1 | 3 | 2 | 1 | 0 | 9 | 4 | +5 | 7 |
| 4 | Estonia | 7 | 15 | 1 | 3 | 11 | 23 | 66 | -43 | 6 |

== See also ==
- Baltic Cup (football)
- Women's Baltic Cup
- Under-21 Baltic Cup
- Under-19 Baltic Cup
- Under-17 Baltic Cup
