= 2010 Baltic Futsal Cup =

Futsal competition among the national teams of Baltic countries

Tournament details
- Host country: Latvia
- Dates: 13–15 December 2010
- Teams: 3 (from 1 confederation)
- Venue(s): 2 (in 2 host cities)

Final positions
- Champions: Latvia (2nd title)
- Runners-up: Lithuania
- Third place: Estonia

Tournament statistics
- Matches played: 3
- Goals scored: 17 (5.67 per match)

The 2010 Baltic Futsal Cup was held from December 13 to 15, 2010 in Latvia. Latvia won the tournament.

== Standings ==
Team	Pld	W	D	L	GF	GA	GD	Pts
Latvia	2	2	0	0	9	3	+6	6
Lithuania	2	1	0	1	6	4	+2	3
Estonia	2	0	0	2	2	10	−8	0

== Matches ==
13 December 2010

Latvia	6–1	Estonia

Ogres sporta hall, Ogre

14 December 2010

Lithuania	4–1	Estonia

Riga

15 December 2010

Latvia	3–2	Lithuania

Riga

== Awards ==
2010 Baltic Futsal Cup

Latvia
Second title
