= 2019 Baltic Futsal Cup =

Futsal competition among the national teams of Baltic countries

Tournament details
- Host country: Estonia
- Dates: 2–4 December 2019
- Teams: 3 (from 1 confederation)
- Venue: Raasiku

Final positions
- Champions: Latvia (6th title)
- Runners-up: Lithuania
- Third place: Estonia

Tournament statistics
- Matches played: 3
- Goals scored: 14 (4.67 per match)

The 2019 Baltic Futsal Cup was held on 2–4 December 2019 in Raasiku, Estonia. This edition featured the three Baltic teams.

== Standings ==
Team	Pld	W	D	L	GF	GA	GD	Pts
Latvia	2	2	0	0	9	2	+7	6
Lithuania	2	1	0	1	5	5	0	3
Estonia	2	0	0	2	0	7	−7	0

Source: www.lff.lv

== Matches ==
2 December 2019	Estonia	0:3	Lithuania	Raasiku
16:30			11' Lukas Sendžikas; 25' Albert Voskunovič; 26' Darius Jankauskas	Stadium: Raasiku Arena

3 December 2019	Lithuania	2:5	Latvia	Raasiku
16:30	Artūr Juchno 14'; Deividas Reimaris 30'		23' Andrejs Baklanovs; 28' Jurijs Halimons; 33' Andrejs Baklanovs; 33' Artūrs Jerofejevs; 35' Maksims Seņs	Stadium: Raasiku Arena

4 December 2019	Latvia	4:0	Estonia	Raasiku
16:30	Andrejs Baklanovs 9'; Ričards Raščevskis 25'; Maksims Seņs 26'; Jānis Pastars 29'			Stadium: Raasiku Arena

== Goalscorers ==
Top Goalscorer:

Andrejs Baklanovs - 3
