= 2014 Baltic Futsal Cup =

Futsal competition among the national teams of Baltic countries

Tournament details
- Host country: Lithuania
- Dates: 5–7 December 2014
- Teams: 3 (from 1 confederation)
- Venue(s): 1 (in 1 host city)

Final positions
- Champions: Latvia (4th title)
- Runners-up: Lithuania
- Third place: Estonia

Tournament statistics
- Matches played: 3
- Goals scored: 19 (6.33 per match)
- Attendance: 1,472 (491 per match)
- Top scorer(s): (Latvia) Germans Matjušenko (3 goals)

The 2014 Baltic Futsal Cup was held from December 5 to 7, 2014 in Lithuania. Latvia won the tournament.

== Standings ==
Team	Pld	W	D	L	GF	GA	GD	Pts
Latvia	2	2	0	0	8	1	+7	6
Lithuania	2	1	0	1	7	7	0	3
Estonia	2	0	0	2	4	11	−7	0

== Matches ==
5 December 2014
19:00

Lithuania	7–3	Estonia
Gornev 19' (o.g.); Bezykornovas 29', 30'; Sendžikas 30', 31'; Šteinas 40'; Buinickij 40'	Report	Tšurilkin 3'; Bõstrov 8'; Aleksejev 18'

Kėdainiai Arena, Kėdainiai
Attendance: 1.222

6 December 2014
16:00

Estonia	1–4	Latvia
Aleksejev 9'	Report	Avanesovs 3'; Matjušenko 7'; Arhipovs-Prokofjevs 36'; Nagibins 38'

Kėdainiai Arena, Kėdainiai
Attendance: 250

7 December 2014
14:00

Lithuania	0–4	Latvia
	Report	Sens 2', 31'; Matjušenko 7', 36'

Kėdainiai Arena, Kėdainiai
Attendance: 800

== Goalscorers ==
3 goals

- (Latvia) Germans Matjušenko

2 goals

- (Lithuania) Marius Bezykornovas
- (Lithuania) Lukas Sendžikas
- (Estonia) Maksim Aleksejev
- (Latvia) Maksim Sens

1 goal

- (Latvia) Igors Avanesovs
- (Latvia) Jurijs Arhipovs-Prokofjevs
- (Latvia) Sergejs Nagibins
- (Lithuania) Arsenij Buinickij
- (Lithuania) Arūnas Šteinas
- (Estonia) Stanislav Bõstrov
- (Estonia) Vladislav Tšurilkin

Own goals

- (Estonia) Andrei Gornev (vs. Lithuania)

== Awards ==
2014 Baltic Futsal Cup

Latvia
Fourth title

- Most Valuable Player
- Top Scorer
  - (Latvia) Germans Matjušenko (3 goals)
- Fair-Play Award
