= 2016 Baltic Futsal Cup =

Futsal competition among the national teams of Baltic countries

Tournament details
- Host country: Latvia
- Dates: 9–11 December 2015
- Teams: 3 (from 1 confederation)
- Venue: 1 (in 1 host city)

Final positions
- Champions: Latvia (5th title)
- Runners-up: Lithuania
- Third place: Estonia

Tournament statistics
- Matches played: 3
- Goals scored: 10 (3.33 per match)
- Attendance: 562 (187 per match)
- Top scorer: (Latvia) Maksims Seņs (3 goals)

The 2016 Baltic Futsal Cup was held from December 9 to 11, 2016 in Latvia.

== Standings ==
Team	Pld	W	D	L	GF	GA	GD	Pts
Latvia	2	2	0	0	6	2	+4	6
Lithuania	2	0	1	1	3	5	−2	1
Estonia	2	0	1	1	1	3	−2	1

== Matches ==
9 December 2016	Estonia	0–2	Latvia	Jelgava
19:00 (UTC+2)		Report	Maksims Seņs 6'; Oskars Ikstens 40'	Stadium: Jelgava Olympic Center; Attendance: 187; Referee: Ingus Puriņš

10 December 2016	Lithuania	1–1	Estonia	Jelgava
14:00 (UTC+2)	Pavel Smolkov 1'	Report	Igor Ivanov 17'	Stadium: Jelgava Olympic Center; Attendance: 80; Referee: Grigori Ošomkov

11 December 2016	Latvia	4–2	Lithuania	Jelgava
14:00 (UTC+2)	Andrejs Aleksejevs 17'; Igors Lapkovskis 37'; Maksims Seņs 38', 40'	Report	Igors Avanesovs 27' (o.g.); Jurij Jeremejev 36'	Stadium: Jelgava Olympic Center; Attendance: 295; Referee: Eduard Fatkuļins

== Goalscorers ==
3 goals

- (Latvia) Maksims Seņs

1 goal

- (Latvia) Oskars Ikstens
- (Latvia) Andrejs Aleksejevs
- (Latvia) Igors Lapkovskis
- (Estonia) Igor Ivanov
- (Lithuania) Pavel Smolkov
- (Lithuania) Jurij Jeremejev

Own goals

- (Latvia) Igors Avanesovs (vs. Lithuania)

== Awards ==
2016 Baltic Futsal Cup

Latvia
Fifth title

- Top Scorer
  - (Latvia) Germans Matjušenko (3 goals)
