= 2017 Baltic Futsal Cup =

Futsal competition among the national teams of Baltic countries

Tournament details
- Host country: Lithuania
- Dates: 5–7 December 2017
- Teams: 3 (from 1 confederation)
- Venue: Šiauliai Arena

Final positions
- Champions: Lithuania (1st title)
- Runners-up: Latvia
- Third place: Estonia

Tournament statistics
- Matches played: 3
- Goals scored: 14 (4.67 per match)

The 2017 Baltic Futsal Cup was held on 5–7 December 2017 in Šiauliai Arena, Šiauliai, Lithuania. This edition featured the three Baltic teams.

== Standings ==
Team	Pld	W	D	L	GF	GA	GD	Pts
Lithuania	2	1	1	0	5	4	+1	4
Latvia	2	1	0	1	5	5	0	3
Estonia	2	0	1	1	4	5	−1	1

Source: Futsal Planet &

== Matches ==
5 December 2017	Lithuania	2–2	Estonia	Šiauliai
18:30 EET	Justinas Zagurskas 25'; Arsenij Buinickij 37'	Report	Maksimas Aleksejevas 25', 27'	Stadium: Šiauliai Arena
Note: Video on YouTube

6 December 2017	Estonia	2–3	Latvia	Šiauliai
18:30 EET	Erik Grigorjev; Andrei Antonov	Report	Artūrs Jerofejevs 2 Andreja Aleksejeva	Stadium: Šiauliai Arena

7 December 2017	Lithuania	3–2	Latvia	Šiauliai
18:30 EET	Justinas Zagurskas 4', 24'; Arsenijus Buinickis 34'	Report	Artūrs Jerofejevs 22'; Oskars Ikstens 36'	Stadium: Šiauliai Arena
Note: Video on YouTube

== Goalscorers ==
3 goals

- (Lithuania) Justinas Zagurskas
- (Latvia) Artūrs Jerofejevs

2 goals

- (Lithuania) Arsenij Buinickij
- (Estonia) Maksimas Aleksejevas

1 goal

- (Estonia) Andrei Antonov
- (Estonia) Erik Grigorjev
- (Latvia) Oskars Ikstens
- (Latvia) Andreja Aleksejeva

== Awards ==
2017 Baltic Futsal Cup

Lithuania
First title

- Top Scorer
  - (Lithuania) Justinas Zagurskas and (Latvia) Artūrs Jerofejevs (3 goals)
