= Lithuania national futsal team =

Lithuania
- Association: Lithuanian Football Federation
- Confederation: UEFA (Europe)
- Head coach: (Brazil) Dentinho
- FIFA code: LTU
- FIFA ranking: 68 ▲9 (8 May 2026)
Home colours	Away colours

First international
- Hungary 5–3 Lithuania (Tiszaújváros, Hungary, June 14, 1999)

Biggest win
- Lithuania 8–1 England (Edegem, Belgium, November 14, 2006); Estonia 0–7 Lithuania (Visoko, Bosnia and Herzegovina, March 2, 2008)

Biggest defeat
- Hungary 14–2 Lithuania (Szerencs, Hungary, June 15, 1999)

FIFA World Cup
- Appearances: 1 (First in 2021)
- Best result: Group stage (2021)

UEFA Futsal Championship
- Appearances: 1 (First in 2026)

The Lithuania national futsal team is controlled by the Lithuanian Football Federation, the governing body for futsal in Lithuania and represents the country in international futsal competitions, such as the World Cup and the European Championships.

Lithuania has made their FIFA Futsal World Cup debut in 2021 as tournament hosts. They have also made their UEFA Futsal Euro debut in 2026 as tournament co-host alongside Latvia and Slovenia.

== Competitive record ==
=== FIFA Futsal World Cup ===
FIFA Futsal World Cup Record
Year	Round	Position	Pld	W	D	L	GS	GA
(Netherlands) 1989	Part of Soviet Union							
(Hong Kong) 1992	Did not enter							
(Spain) 1996	Did not qualify							
(Guatemala) 2000	Did not qualify							
(Chinese Taipei) 2004	Did not qualify							
(Brazil) 2008	Did not qualify							
(Thailand) 2012	Did not qualify							
(Colombia) 2016	Did not qualify							
(Lithuania) 2021	Group stage	20th	3	0	0	3	3	11
(Uzbekistan) 2024	Did not qualify							
Total:1/10	Group stage	20th	3	0	0	3	3	11

=== UEFA Futsal Championship ===
UEFA Futsal Championship record
Year	Round	Position	Pld	W	D	L	GS	GA
(Spain) 1996	Did not compete							
(Spain) 1999	Did not compete							
(Russia) 2001	Did not qualify							
(Italy) 2003	Did not qualify							
(Czech Republic) 2005	Did not qualify							
(Portugal) 2007	Did not qualify							
(Hungary) 2010	Did not qualify							
(Croatia) 2012	Did not qualify							
(Belgium) 2014	Did not qualify							
(Serbia) 2016	Did not qualify							
(Slovenia) 2018	Did not qualify							
(Netherlands) 2022	Did not qualify							
(Latvia) (Lithuania) (Slovenia) 2026	Group stage	TBD	3	0	2	1	7	10
Total:1/13	Group stage	TBD	3	0	2	1	7	10

=== Baltic Futsal Cup ===
Baltic Futsal Cup record
Year	Round	Position	Pld	W	D	L	GS	GA
(Latvia) 2008		2	2	1	0	1	7	5
(Latvia) 2010		2	2	1	0	1	6	4
(Latvia) 2013		2	2	1	0	1	2	5
(Lithuania) 2014		2	2	1	0	1	7	7
(Estonia) 2015		4	3	1	0	2	11	12
(Latvia) 2016		2	2	0	1	1	3	5
(Estonia) 2017		1	2	2	0	0	5	4
(Lithuania) 2018		3	no data					
(Estonia) 2019		2	2	1	0	1	5	5
(Latvia) 2021		1	2	2	0	0	16	5
(Denmark) 2023	Nordic−Baltic Futsal Cup (Note: Joint Nordic Futsal Cup and Baltic Futsal Cup tournament.)	4	4	0	1	3	9	14

== Players ==
=== Current squad ===
The following players were called up to the squad for the 2028 FIFA Futsal World Cup qualifying matches against Turkey, Bulgaria and North Macedonia on 9, 10 and 12 April 2026 respectively.

No.	Pos.	Player	Date of birth (age)	Caps	Goals	Club
2	GK	Edgaras Noreika	7 June 2005 (age 21)			(Lithuanian Football Federation) FK Bruklinas Vilkaviškis
22	GK	Gustas Jaskutis	6 September 2004 (age 21)			(Lithuanian Football Federation) FK Jonavos Vikingai
5	DF	Vladimir Derendiajev	31 May 1990 (age 36)			(Lithuanian Football Federation) FK Kauno Žalgiris
7	DF	Benas Spietinis	15 February 1996 (age 30)			(Lithuanian Football Federation) FK Kauno Žalgiris
9	DF	Justinas Zagurskas (captain)	9 October 1995 (age 30)			(Lithuanian Football Federation) FK Kauno Žalgiris
11	DF	Kristupas Petravičius	26 June 2000 (age 26)			(Lithuanian Football Federation) FSK Radviliškis
18	DF	Merūnas Stalmokas	5 March 2007 (age 19)			(Lithuanian Football Federation) Gargždų Pramogos
4	FW	Lukas Katilius	29 November 2007 (age 18)			(Lithuanian Football Federation) FK Bruklinas Vilkaviškis
6	FW	Emilijus Rusteika	13 July 2006 (age 20)			(Lithuanian Football Federation) FK Kauno Žalgiris
8	FW	Albert Voskunovič	8 December 1998 (age 27)			(Lithuanian Football Federation) FK Kauno Žalgiris
10	FW	Lukas Sendžikas	28 November 1992 (age 33)			(Lithuanian Football Federation) FK Kauno Žalgiris
14	FW	Paulius Lotužys	15 January 1998 (age 28)			(Lithuanian Football Federation) Gargždų Pramogos
15	FW	Ignas Raštutis	20 March 2000 (age 26)			(Lithuanian Football Federation) FK Jonavos Vikingai
17	FW	Paulius Osauskas	17 May 1994 (age 32)			(Lithuanian Football Federation) FK Jonavos Vikingai

=== Recent call-ups ===
The following players have also been called up to the squad within the last 12 months.

Pos.	Player	Date of birth (age)	Caps	Goals	Club	Latest call-up
GK	Ernestas Macenis	3 May 1997 (age 29)			(Lithuania) FK Kauno Žalgiris	UEFA Futsal Euro 2026
GK	Karolis Čirba	1 March 1997 (age 29)			(Lithuania) FK Jonavos Vikingai	v. Latvia, 20 December 2025
GK	Adamas Vieraitis	24 December 2000 (age 25)			(Lithuania) FK Bruklinas Vilkaviškis	v. Latvia, 20 December 2025
DF	Tomas Bučma	27 January 1994 (age 32)			(Lithuania) FK Kauno Žalgiris	UEFA Futsal Euro 2026
DF	Gytis Vasylius	12 August 1999 (age 27)			(Lithuania) FK Jonavos Vikingai	UEFA Futsal Euro 2026
DF	Artūr Juchno	27 May 1992 (age 34)			(Lithuania) FK Jonavos Vikingai	UEFA Futsal Euro 2026
FW	Edgaras Baranauskas	12 March 1993 (age 33)			(Lithuania) FK Kauno Žalgiris	UEFA Futsal Euro 2026
FW	Deividas Reimaris	13 September 1997 (age 28)			(Lithuania) Gargždų Pramogos	UEFA Futsal Euro 2026
^{INJ} Player withdrew from the squad due to an injury.^{PRE} Preliminary squad.^{RET} Retired from international futsal.

== Results and fixtures ==
Legend

Win Draw Lose Fixture

=== 2021 FIFA Futsal World Cup results ===
12 September 2021 FIFA Futsal World Cup GS Group A	Lithuania	1–2; Source (FIFA)	Venezuela	Kaunas, Lithuania
20:00		Report (FIFA)		Stadium: Žalgiris Arena

15 September 2021 FIFA Futsal World Cup GS Group A	Lithuania	0–3; Source (FIFA)	Kazakhstan	Kaunas, Lithuania
20:00		Report (FIFA)		Stadium: Žalgiris Arena

18 September 2021 FIFA Futsal World Cup GS Group A	Costa Rica	6–2; Source (FIFA)	Lithuania	Kaunas, Lithuania
20:00		Report (FIFA)		Stadium: Žalgiris Arena

=== UEFA Futsal Euro 2026 results ===
22 January 2026	Lithuania	3–3	Czech Republic	Žalgiris Arena, Kaunas
20:00 UTC+2	E. Baranauskas 12'46"; Raštutis 16'49"; Derendiajev 18'30"	Report	Seidler 9'29", 14'27"; Francisco 39'25"	Attendance: 5,198; Referee: Dejan Veselič (Slovenia), Aleš Močnik Perič (Slovenia)

25 January 2026	Ukraine	4–1	Lithuania	Žalgiris Arena, Kaunas
17:00 UTC+2	Cherniavskyi 6'56"; Pervieiev 12'45"; Korsun 22'55"; Abakshyn 32'31"	Report	Derendiajev 35'10"	Attendance: 6,092; Referee: Hikmat Qafarli (Azerbaijan), Peter Nurse (England)

28 January 2026	Lithuania	3–3	Armenia	Žalgiris Arena, Kaunas
20:30 UTC+2	Baranauskas 24'32", 34'00"; Vasylius 36'31"	Report	Nevedrov 2'09"; Reimaris 18'34" (o.g.); Sanosyan 29'25"	Attendance: 2,677; Referee: Rúben Santos (Portugal), Cristiano Santos (Portugal)
