= Baltic Futsal League =

- Organiser(s): MTÜ Baltic Futsal League
- Founded: 2019
- Region: Baltic
- Teams: 8
- Website: Website
- 2019-2020 Baltic Futsal League

The Baltic Futsal League is a futsal club commercial competition involving 8 teams from Estonia, Latvia, Lithuania, Russia, and Belarus.

The debut season was scheduled to take place between October 2019 and April 2020, but was interrupted by COVID-19 pandemic in March 2020 and postponed until further notice. The competition format is one round among 8 teams, adding up to 28 matches in total.

A big challenge for the organizers was the match calendar that suits participants from all countries, as the national championships in each country take place at very different times throughout the year.

The matches were covered by media, social media and online streaming services, including in-depth live statistics. The tournament was prepared as a media product, hoping to attract sponsors, advertisers, and potentially reach TV audiences. The participating clubs are incentivized by free travel and accommodation. In the first ever Baltic Futsal League press-conference in Saint Petersburg on 14 May 2019, the league organizers paid particular attention at commercial, PR and marketing aspects of the competition, providing free training and consultations to each of the participating clubs. The league will promote growth and experience of the clubs, planning to expand the league in the future, attracting participants from more countries.

== Participants ==
A total of eight teams competed in the 2019–2020 season:

- FC Cosmos (Estonia)
- FC Narva United (Estonia)
- FK Vytis Futsal (Lithuania)
- FC Gargzdu Pramogos (Lithuania)
- TFK Rezekne (Latvia)
- FC Petrow (Latvia)
- MFK AGIO-FM (МФК «АЖИО-ФМ») (Russia)
- MFK Stolitsa (МФК «Столица») (Belarus)

Note: Two Saint Petersburg teams «АЖИО» and «Фруктовый мир» have joined together to compete as «АЖИО-ФМ».

== Current Season ==
The first match took place on 2019 October 18 in Riga. The last round of the season was planned to take place 11 April 2020 in Tallinn, with award ceremony to follow. However, in the light of the COVID-19 pandemic, on 12 March it was announced that the championship is being suspended until further notice. As the pandemic was easing, the organizers held an online conference with the participating clubs on 23 July 2020. Discussion about completing 2019–2020 season as well as 2020–2021 season schedule were questions on the agenda.

Matchday 1

18 October 2019

FC Petrow (Latvia)	4:7	(Lithuania) FK Vytis

(Latvia) Rīga

19 October 2019

FC Cosmos (Estonia)	1:3	(Russia) Agio FM

(Estonia) Kehra

20 October 2019

TFK Rēzekne (Latvia)	2:4	(Estonia) Narva United FC

(Latvia) Ludza

2 November 2019

FC Stalitsa (Belarus)	7:1	(Lithuania) Gargždų Pramogos

(Belarus) Minsk

Matchday 2

15 November 2019

FK Vytis (Lithuania)	5:1	(Latvia) TFK Rēzekne

(Lithuania) Jonava

16 November 2019

Agio FM (Russia)	10:3	(Estonia) Narva United FC

(Russia) Saint Petersburg

17 November 2019

Gargždų Pramogos (Lithuania)	3:4	(Latvia) FC Petrow

(Lithuania) Gargždai

27 November 2019

FC Cosmos (Estonia)	2:10	(Belarus) FC Stalitsa

(Estonia) Tallinn

Matchday 3

14 December 2019

FC Stalitsa (Belarus)	4:4	(Russia) Agio FM
Penalties
	4:5

(Belarus) Minsk

15 December 2019

Narva United FC (Estonia)	2:4	(Estonia) FC Cosmos

(Estonia) Narva

19 December 2019

FK Vytis (Lithuania)	6:3	(Lithuania) Gargždų Pramogos

(Lithuania) Kaunas

21 December 2019

FC Petrow (Latvia)	7:3	(Latvia) TFK Rēzekne

(Latvia) Rīga

Matchday 4

17 January 2020

FC Stalitsa (Belarus)	4:0	(Latvia) TFK Rēzekne

(Belarus) Minsk

18 January 2020

Gargždų Pramogos (Lithuania)	5:11	(Russia) Agio FM

(Lithuania) Gargždai

9 February 2020

FC Cosmos (Estonia)	1:9	(Latvia) FC Petrow

(Estonia) Kehra

1 March 2020(tbc)

Narva United FC (Estonia)	v	(Lithuania) FK Vytis

(Estonia) Narva

Matchday 5

13 February 2019

FC Petrow (Latvia)	3:7	(Belarus) FC Stalitsa

(Latvia) Jelgava

23 February 2020

Gargždų Pramogos (Lithuania)	3:5	(Estonia) Narva United FC

(Lithuania) Gargždai

21 March 2020(tbc)

Agio FM (Russia)	v	(Lithuania) FK Vytis

(Russia) Saint Petersburg

29 February 2020(tbc)

TFK Rēzekne (Latvia)	5:7	(Estonia) FC Cosmos

(Latvia) Ludza

Matchday 6 will take place 14–18 March

postponed

Final matchday will take place 11 April in Tallinn

postponed

=== Championship Table ===
- as of 29 February

#	Club	Played	Win	Draw	Lose	Win on Penalties	Lose on Penalties	Goals +	Goals -	Goal Diff.	Points
1	FC Stalitsa	5	4	1	0	0	1	32	10	+22	13
2	AGIO FM	4	3	1	0	1	0	28	13	+15	11
3	FK Vytis	3	3	0	0	0	0	18	8	+10	9
4	FC Petrow	5	3	0	2	0	0	27	21	-6	9
5	Narva UTD	4	2	0	2	0	0	14	19	-5	6
6	FC Cosmos	5	2	0	3	0	0	15	28	-13	6
7	TFK Rezekne	5	0	0	5	0	0	10	27	-17	0
8	Gargždų Pramogos	5	0	0	5	0	0	15	33	-18	0

=== Top Scorers ===
#	Player	Minutes Played	Goals
1	Mykhailo Grytsyna /FC Stalitsa/	41'	9
2	Maksim Sens /FC Petrow	79	6
3	Kirill Osinovskiy /AGIO FM/	53'	5
4	Roman Ananev /AGIO FM/	53'	4
5	Ruslan Lazyuk /FC Stalitsa/	59'	4
6	Beto /FC Stalitsa/	61'	4

== 2020-2021 season ==
The first meeting of the League Board took place in the Tallinn on 1 of March. The league calendar was discussed, as well as the league promotion. It was announced that currently there are 12 clubs from 9 countries interested in the 2020–2021 season. There would be 22 league rounds, totaling to 132 games. The matches would take place between October and April.

The competition was affected by COVID-19 pandemic, the completion of 2019–2020 season was postponed, which is likely to affect the start of the next season. The clubs and the organizers met on an online conference on 23 July 2020 to discuss the next season's calendar, yet no details were made public.

There were talks that the number and the geography of the participants will expand, however the list of participants was announced on 28 November, which included 8 teams — two from Estonia, Latvia, Lithuania, and one from Belarus and Ukraine. Seven of the clubs remained the same, the Ukrainian team replaced the Russian team.

At the beginning of December the numbers of COVID-19 cases increased rapidly, and on 8 December 2020 the organizers announced that the season start is postponed to April 2021.

1	„FK Vytis Kaunas“ (Lithuania)
2	„Gargždų Pramogos–SC“ (Lithuania)
3	„FC Petrow“ (Latvia)
4	TFK Rezekne (Latvia)
5	„MFK Stolitsa“ (МФК «Столица») (Belarus)
6	„SK Sokil“ (СК «Сокіл») (Ukraine)
7	„FC Narva United“ (Estonia)
8	„FC Cosmos“ (Estonia)
