= Kaspars Dumpis =

Latvian luger (born 1982)

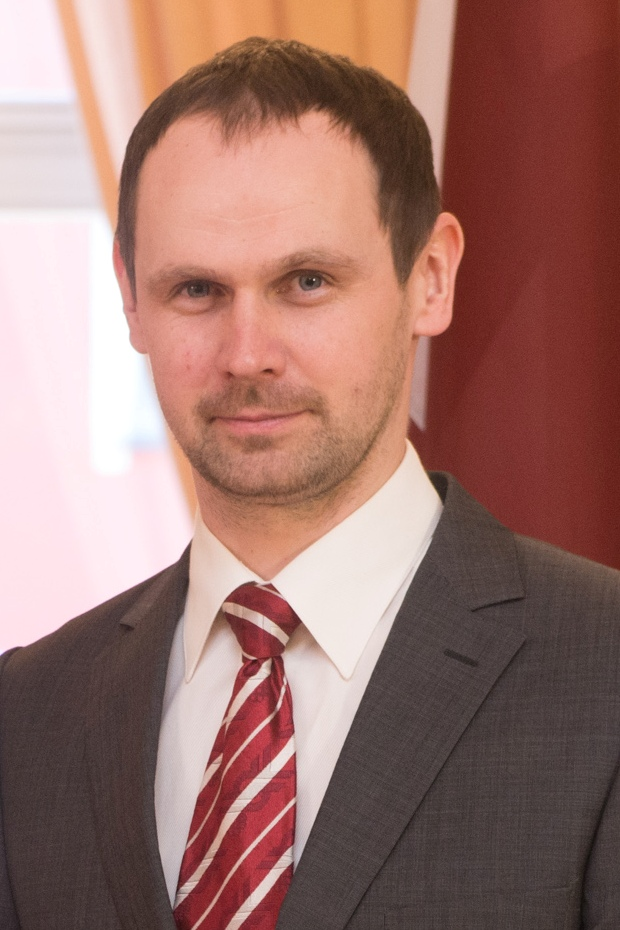
Kaspars Dumpis in 2015

Kaspars Dumpis (born 23 December 1982 in Ogre) is a Latvian former luger who has competed since 2002. He finished 17th in the men's singles event at the 2006 Winter Olympics in Turin.

Dumpis also finished 22nd in the men's singles event at the 2005 FIL World Luge Championships in Park City, Utah.

In 2014 Dumpis was appointed as coach of the Latvian luge team. As of 2019 Dumpis is assistant coach for the United States Junior luge team.

== Sources ==
- 2006 luge men's singles results
- Delfi.lv profile (in Latvian)
- FIL-Luge profile
