= Ramūnas Radavičius =

Lithuanian footballer (born 1981)

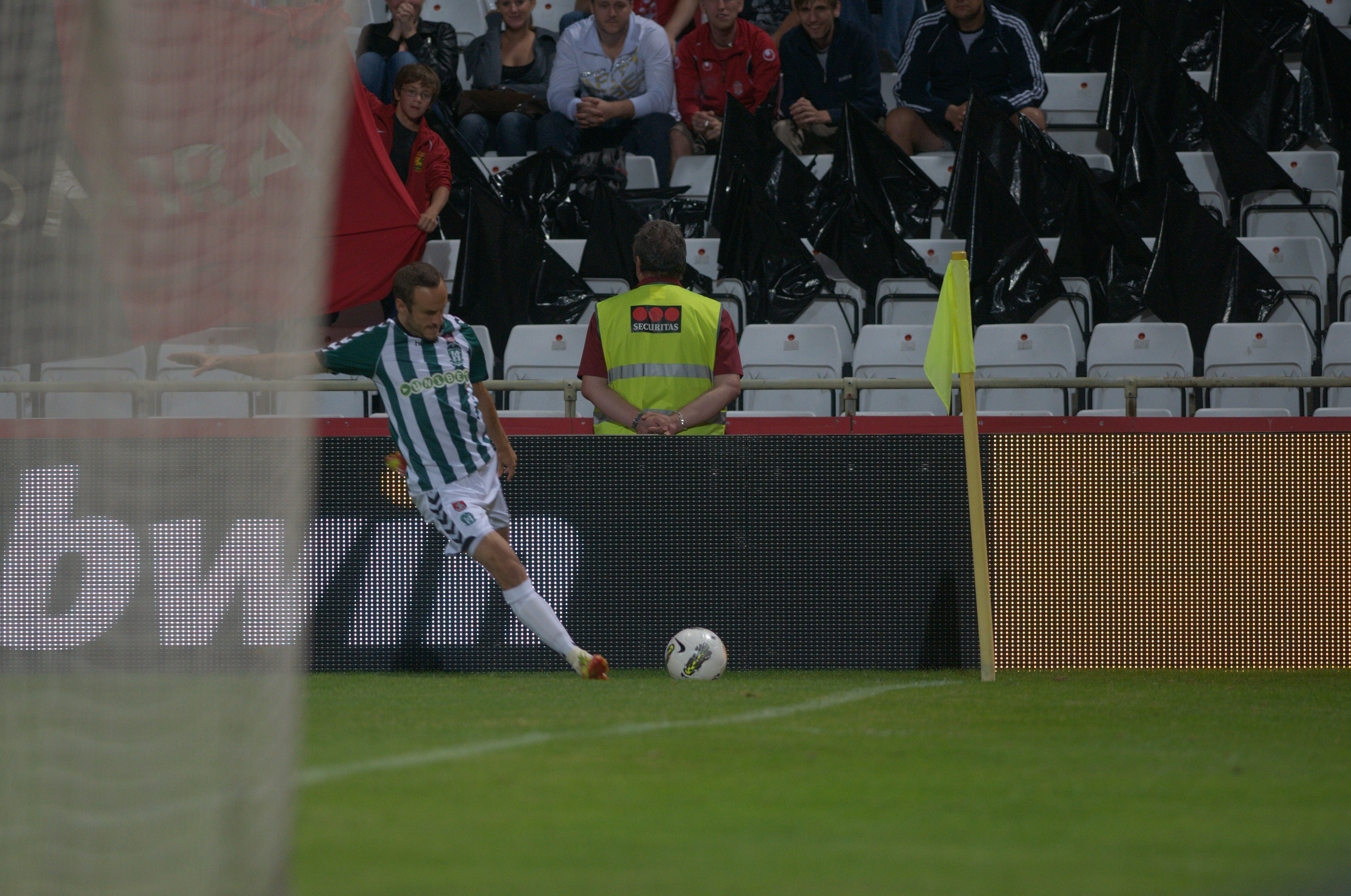

Personal information
- Date of birth: 20 January 1981 (age 45)
- Height: 1.79 m (5 ft 10 1/2 in)
- Position: Midfielder

Senior career*
Years	Team	Apps	(Gls)
2003–2007	FC Vilnius	114	(8)
2007–2008	FK Žalgiris Vilnius	24	(2)
2008–2009	FK Sūduva Marijampolė	38	(7)
2010–2012	FK Ekranas	71	(19)
2012–2014	Žalgiris Vilnius	53	(7)
2015	FK Šiauliai	25	(5)
2016	FC Vytis Vilnius	25	(10)
2017–2018	FK Panerys		

International career^{‡}
2010–2014	Lithuania	21	(1)
- * Club domestic league appearances and goals as of 17:13, 24 January 2012 (UTC) ‡ National team caps and goals as of 17:13, 24 January 2012 (UTC)

Ramūnas Radavičius (born 20 January 1981) is a Lithuanian former international footballer who played as a midfielder.

== Career ==
Radavičius has played club football for FC Vilnius, FK Žalgiris Vilnius, FK Sūduva Marijampolė and FK Ekranas.

He made his international debut for Lithuania in 2010.
