= UEFA Futsal Euro 2026 squads =

List of the national futsal squads that take part in the UEFA Futsal Euro 2026

The UEFA Futsal Euro 2026 is an international futsal tournament to be held in the Latvia, Lithuania and Slovenia from 21 January to 7 February 2026. The 16 national teams involved in the tournament were required by UEFA to register a squad of 14 players, including two goalkeepers. Each team is allowed to replace a maximum of one outfield player if he is injured or ill severely enough to prevent his participation in the tournament. Each team is also allowed to temporarily replace a goalkeeper if there are fewer than two healthy goalkeepers.

This article lists the national futsal squads that take part in the tournament. The age listed for each player is as of 21 January 2026, the first day of the tournament.

== Group A ==
=== Croatia ===
Head coach: Marinko Mavrović

No.	Pos.	Player	Date of birth (age)	Club
1	GK	Ante Piplica	6 June 2000 (aged 25)	(Croatian Football Federation) Futsal Dinamo
23	GK	Nikola Čižmić	31 October 2000 (aged 25)	(Croatian Football Federation) Hajduk
4	DF	Duje Kustura	2 July 1998 (aged 27)	(Croatian Football Federation) Olmissum
8	DF	Kristian Čekol	30 December 1997 (aged 28)	(Croatian Football Federation) Futsal Dinamo
11	DF	Jakov Hrstić	25 August 2000 (aged 25)	(Croatian Football Federation) Torcida Biberon
16	DF	Marko Kuraja	27 February 1997 (aged 28)	(Croatian Football Federation) Square
3	FW	Nikola Gudasić	6 December 1999 (aged 26)	(Croatian Football Federation) Futsal Dinamo
5	FW	Niko Vukmir	27 August 2001 (aged 24)	(Royal Spanish Football Federation) O Parrulo Ferrol
7	FW	Franco Jelovčić	6 July 1991 (aged 34)	(Croatian Football Federation) Torcida Biberon
9	FW	Luka Perić	9 February 1997 (aged 28)	(Football Association of Bosnia and Herzegovina) Bubamara Cazin
10	FW	Josip Jurlina	13 January 2000 (aged 26)	(Italian Football Federation) Sporting Sala Consilina
15	FW	David Mataja	17 March 1997 (aged 28)	(Polish Football Association) Constract Lubawa
17	FW	Antonio Sekulić	22 January 1999 (aged 26)	(Croatian Football Federation) Osijek Kandit
19	FW	Vitor Hugo	16 August 1996 (aged 29)	(Croatian Football Federation) Novo Vrijeme

=== France ===
Head coach: Raphaël Reynaud

On 21 January 2026, sidelined by a knee injury, Ayoub Saadaoui was withdrawn from the squad and was replaced by Amin Benslama.

No.	Pos.	Player	Date of birth (age)	Club
1	GK	Francis Lokoka	8 September 1993 (aged 32)	(French Football Federation) Sporting Club de Paris
12	GK	Louis Marquet	15 May 1993 (aged 32)	(French Football Federation) Étoile lavalloise Futsal Club
16	GK	Joévin Durot	25 November 1985 (aged 40)	(Royal Belgian Football Association) Futsal Team Charleroi
2	DF	Sid Belhaj	28 August 1992 (aged 33)	(French Football Federation) Sporting Club de Paris
11	DF	Souheil Mouhoudine	29 March 1995 (aged 30)	(French Football Federation) Étoile lavalloise Futsal Club
13	DF	Mamadou Toure	27 January 1998 (aged 27)	(French Football Federation) Sporting Club de Paris
22	DF	Amin Benslama	13 May 2003 (aged 22)	(Royal Spanish Football Federation) Unión África Ceutí
3	FW	Amine Gueddoura	20 January 2002 (aged 24)	(French Football Federation) Montpellier Méditerranée Futsal
5	FW	Arthur Tchato	2 November 1995 (aged 30)	(French Football Federation) Sporting Club de Paris
10	FW	Abdessamad Mohammed	10 December 1990 (aged 35)	(French Football Federation) Étoile lavalloise Futsal Club
14	FW	Ouassini Guirio	14 December 2000 (aged 25)	(French Football Federation) Étoile lavalloise Futsal Club
15	FW	Nicolas Menendez	3 February 1996 (aged 29)	(French Football Federation) Montpellier Méditerranée Futsal
19	FW	Marouane Rezzoug	3 October 2005 (aged 20)	(French Football Federation) Montpellier Méditerranée Futsal
20	FW	Mamadou Touré	15 September 2001 (aged 24)	(Royal Spanish Football Federation) FC Barcelona

=== Georgia ===
Head coach: Avtandil Asatiani

No.	Pos.	Player	Date of birth (age)	Club
12	GK	Tornike Bukia	15 May 1994 (aged 31)	(Georgian Football Federation) Georgians Tbilisi
16	GK	Ali Aslani	27 September 1998 (aged 27)	(Georgian Football Federation) MFC Ciu
3	DF	Saba Tkeshelashvili	10 July 2002 (aged 23)	(Georgian Football Federation) MFC Ciu
7	DF	Shota Topuria	14 May 1990 (aged 35)	(Georgian Football Federation) Georgians Tbilisi
9	DF	Irakli Todua	7 September 1990 (aged 35)	(Georgian Football Federation) Georgians Tbilisi
2	FW	Nikoloz Gabrichidze	16 September 1997 (aged 28)	(Georgian Football Federation) Georgians Tbilisi
4	FW	Giorgi Chimakadze	2 July 1997 (aged 28)	(Georgian Football Federation) MFC Ciu
5	FW	Giorgi Ghavtadze	30 October 2000 (aged 25)	(Russian Football Union) Tyumen
6	FW	Janiko Giorgaia	17 October 1996 (aged 29)	(Georgian Football Federation) MFC Ciu
8	FW	Vakhtang Kekelia	10 September 1989 (aged 36)	(Georgian Football Federation) Georgians Tbilisi
10	FW	Vakhtangi Jvarashvili	30 August 1994 (aged 31)	(Georgian Football Federation) Georgians Tbilisi
14	FW	Nukri Сhumburidze	1 July 1993 (aged 32)	(Georgian Football Federation) Georgians Tbilisi
17	FW	Archil Sebiskveradze	14 August 1989 (aged 36)	(Georgian Football Federation) MFC Ciu
18	FW	Jano Kvaratskhelia	4 August 1995 (aged 30)	(Russian Football Union) Sibiryak

=== Latvia ===
Head coach: (Italy) Massimiliano Bellarte

No.	Pos.	Player	Date of birth (age)	Club
23	GK	Igors Labuts	7 June 1990 (aged 35)	(Latvian Football Federation) Riga FC
25	GK	Rainers Mūrnieks	27 July 2004 (aged 21)	(Latvian Football Federation) Riga FC
4	DF	Ņikita Jelagovs	4 April 2003 (aged 22)	(Latvian Football Federation) TFK Beitar
11	DF	Miks Babris	3 October 1999 (aged 26)	(Portuguese Football Federation) FC Famalicão
13	DF	Vlads Rimkus	28 May 1993 (aged 32)	(Latvian Football Federation) Riga FC
6	FW	Renards Ūdris	20 December 2005 (aged 20)	(Latvian Football Federation) Riga FC
8	FW	Andžejs Mickēvičs	1 April 2002 (aged 23)	(Latvian Football Federation) Riga FC
9	FW	Viktors Kuļepovs	23 August 2001 (aged 24)	(Latvian Football Federation) Riga FC
10	FW	Edgars Tarakanovs	15 February 2003 (aged 22)	(Royal Belgian Football Association) RSC Anderlecht
14	FW	Germans Matjušenko	16 May 1994 (aged 31)	(Latvian Football Federation) Riga FC
17	FW	Toms Kristians Grīslis	6 September 2002 (aged 23)	(Latvian Football Federation) TFK Beitar
18	FW	Andrejs Baklanovs	4 June 1998 (aged 27)	(Italian Football Federation) CDM Futsal
21	FW	Aleksandrs Kuļešovs	11 October 1995 (aged 30)	(Latvian Football Federation) TFK Salaspils
98	FW	Sergejs Motiļs	23 May 2006 (aged 19)	(Latvian Football Federation) TFK Beitar

== Group B ==
=== Armenia ===
Head coach: Ruben Nazaretyan

No.	Pos.	Player	Date of birth (age)	Club
12	GK	Emin Gharabekians	19 January 1991 (aged 35)	(Football Federation of Armenia) Unisport
16	GK	Albert Agadzhanov	5 February 1994 (aged 31)	(Russian Football Union) TZMS Tula
3	DF	Gamlet Manukian	4 April 1991 (aged 34)	(Football Federation of Armenia) Unisport
5	DF	Mikael Gandilian	24 March 1994 (aged 31)	(Russian Football Union) Air-Aero
9	DF	Sargis Margaryan	7 September 1993 (aged 32)	(Football Federation of Armenia) Unisport
13	DF	Artur Melkonyan	29 October 1991 (aged 34)	(Russian Football Union) Lipetsk
6	FW	Nikita Khromykh	27 March 1995 (aged 30)	(Russian Football Union) Tula
7	FW	Vladimir Sanosyan	29 April 1996 (aged 29)	(Russian Football Union) Norilsk Nickel
8	FW	Denis Nevedrov	6 April 1994 (aged 31)	(Russian Football Union) Tyumen
10	FW	Arseni Petrosyan	14 June 2003 (aged 22)	(Russian Football Union) Novaya Generacia
11	FW	Garegin Mashumyan	1 September 1989 (aged 36)	(Football Federation of Armenia) Yerevan
17	FW	Arsen Petrosov	5 June 2006 (aged 19)	(Russian Football Union) Torpedo
18	FW	Aghasi Yeghiazaryan	1 March 2006 (aged 19)	(Football Federation of Armenia) Yerevan
19	FW	Mihran Dermenjyan	18 August 1997 (aged 28)	(Football Federation of Armenia) Unisport

=== Czech Republic ===
Head coach: Marek Kopecký

No.	Pos.	Player	Date of birth (age)	Club
1	GK	Michal Hůla	3 August 1998 (aged 27)	(Polish Football Association) Widzew Łódź
12	GK	Jan Žežulka	28 June 2001 (aged 24)	(Football Association of the Czech Republic) Slavia Praha
4	DF	Radim Záruba	28 December 1994 (aged 31)	(Football Association of the Czech Republic) Chrudim
6	DF	Adam Rhouila	17 February 1999 (aged 26)	(French Football Federation) Hérouville Futsal
9	DF	Tomáš Koudelka	17 December 1990 (aged 35)	(Football Association of the Czech Republic) Chrudim
13	DF	Michal Holý	29 May 1990 (aged 35)	(Football Association of the Czech Republic) Plzeň
3	FW	Joao Mikuš	23 February 1999 (aged 26)	(Portuguese Football Federation) Portimonense
5	FW	Pavel Drozd	12 September 1995 (aged 30)	(Football Association of the Czech Republic) Chrudim
7	FW	Francisco Mikuš	23 February 1999 (aged 26)	(Football Association of the Czech Republic) Plzeň
10	FW	Michal Seidler	5 April 1990 (aged 35)	(Football Association of the Czech Republic) Chrudim
11	FW	David Drozd	12 September 1995 (aged 30)	(Football Association of the Czech Republic) Chrudim
14	FW	Tomáš Vnuk	1 December 1993 (aged 32)	(Football Association of the Czech Republic) Plzeň
15	FW	Jiří Zápotocký	15 November 2004 (aged 21)	(Football Association of the Czech Republic) Plzeň
18	FW	Adam Knobloch	29 September 2002 (aged 23)	(Football Association of the Czech Republic) Plzeň

=== Lithuania ===
Head coach: (Brazil) Dentinho

No.	Pos.	Player	Date of birth (age)	Club
12	GK	Ernestas Macenis	3 May 1997 (aged 28)	(Lithuanian Football Federation) Kauno Žalgiris
22	GK	Gustas Jaskutis	6 September 2004 (aged 21)	(Lithuanian Football Federation) Vikingai
5	DF	Vladimir Derendiajev	31 May 1990 (aged 35)	(Lithuanian Football Federation) Kauno Žalgiris
6	DF	Tomas Bučma	27 January 1994 (aged 31)	(Lithuanian Football Federation) Kauno Žalgiris
9	DF	Justinas Zagurskas	9 October 1995 (aged 30)	(Lithuanian Football Federation) Kauno Žalgiris
13	DF	Gytis Vasylius	12 August 1999 (aged 26)	(Lithuanian Football Federation) Vikingai
16	DF	Artūr Juchno	27 May 1992 (aged 33)	(Lithuanian Football Federation) Vikingai
17	DF	Paulius Osauskas	17 May 1994 (aged 31)	(Lithuanian Football Federation) Vikingai
3	FW	Ignas Raštutis	23 March 2000 (aged 25)	(Lithuanian Football Federation) Vikingai
7	FW	Benas Spietinis	15 February 1996 (aged 29)	(Lithuanian Football Federation) Kauno Žalgiris
8	FW	Albert Voskunovič	8 December 1998 (aged 27)	(Lithuanian Football Federation) Kauno Žalgiris
10	FW	Lukas Sendžikas	28 November 1992 (aged 33)	(Lithuanian Football Federation) Kauno Žalgiris
11	FW	Edgaras Baranauskas	12 March 1993 (aged 32)	(Lithuanian Football Federation) Kauno Žalgiris
15	FW	Deividas Reimaris	13 September 1997 (aged 28)	(Lithuanian Football Federation) Gargždų Pramogos

=== Ukraine ===
Head coach: Oleksandr Kosenko

No.	Pos.	Player	Date of birth (age)	Club
1	GK	Ivan Bielimov	28 March 2006 (aged 19)	(Kazakhstan Football Federation) FC Caspiy
17	GK	Oleksandr Sukhov	8 June 1997 (aged 28)	(Ukrainian Association of Football) HIT Kyiv
19	GK	Yuriy Savenko	21 January 1992 (aged 34)	(Ukrainian Association of Football) Kyiv Futsal
3	DF	Nazar Shved	16 March 1997 (aged 28)	(Polish Football Association) Eurobus Przemyśl
6	DF	Mykola Mykytiuk	13 September 1996 (aged 29)	(Royal Spanish Football Federation) Ribera Navarra
13	DF	Ihor Korsun	15 June 1993 (aged 32)	(Royal Spanish Football Federation) Osasuna Magna
15	DF	Illia Prykhodko	14 November 2007 (aged 18)	(Ukrainian Association of Football) Uragan Ivano-Frankivsk
5	FW	Yevhenii Zhuk	15 April 1993 (aged 32)	(Ukrainian Association of Football) HIT Kyiv
8	FW	Oleksandr Pediash	4 March 1994 (aged 31)	(Ukrainian Association of Football) HIT Kyiv
9	FW	Danyil Abakshyn	22 December 1997 (aged 28)	(Polish Football Association) Eurobus Przemyśl
10	FW	Ihor Cherniavskyi	14 September 1995 (aged 30)	(Ukrainian Association of Football) HIT Kyiv
11	FW	Artem Fareniuk	9 November 1992 (aged 33)	(Polish Football Association) Eurobus Przemyśl
14	FW	Petro Shoturma	27 June 1992 (aged 33)	(Ukrainian Association of Football) Uragan Ivano-Frankivsk
18	FW	Vladyslav Pervieiev	5 March 2002 (aged 23)	(Ukrainian Association of Football) HIT Kyiv

== Group C ==
=== Belarus ===
Head coach: Aleksandr Chernik

No.	Pos.	Player	Date of birth (age)	Club
12	GK	Aleksei Luksha	8 October 1992 (aged 33)	(Football Federation of Belarus) MFC Stalitsa Minsk
16	GK	Artem Petukhov	22 June 2000 (aged 25)	(Football Federation of Belarus) BC Gomel
5	DF	Vladislav Selyuk	19 November 1993 (aged 32)	(Football Federation of Belarus) VRZ Gomel
17	DF	Maksim Baturin	12 September 1993 (aged 32)	(Football Federation of Belarus) Viten Orsha
21	DF	Igor Shcherbich	21 December 1992 (aged 33)	(Football Federation of Belarus) MFC Stalitsa Minsk
27	DF	Pavel Ragovik	27 January 1991 (aged 34)	(Football Federation of Belarus) Viten Orsha
61	DF	Artem Kozel	20 June 1994 (aged 31)	(Football Federation of Belarus) MFC Stalitsa Minsk
7	FW	Aleksei Pinchuk	2 November 1991 (aged 34)	(Football Federation of Belarus) VRZ Gomel
11	FW	Sergei Krykun	11 July 1991 (aged 34)	(Russian Football Union) MFK KPRF
13	FW	Andrei Semianiuk	17 March 1988 (aged 37)	(Football Federation of Belarus) FC Minsk
15	FW	Dmitri Shimanovski	4 October 1994 (aged 31)	(Football Federation of Belarus) MFC Stalitsa Minsk
26	FW	Artem Yakubov	26 August 1993 (aged 32)	(Football Federation of Belarus) MFC Stalitsa Minsk
80	FW	Dmitri Shvedko	26 March 2000 (aged 25)	(Russian Football Union) MFK KPRF
99	FW	Yuri Dubkov	30 June 2000 (aged 25)	(Football Federation of Belarus) VRZ Gomel

=== Belgium ===
Head coach: Karim Bachar

No.	Pos.	Player	Date of birth (age)	Club
1	GK	Dries Vrancken	11 August 1998 (aged 27)	(Royal Belgian Football Association) Futsal Topsport Antwerpen
12	GK	Bram Meyers	1 October 1990 (aged 35)	(Royal Dutch Football Association) Tigers Roermond
16	DF	Matteo Cordier	6 April 1999 (aged 26)	(Royal Belgian Football Association) Futsal Team Charleroi
3	FW	Thibeau Dochez	28 September 2001 (aged 24)	(Royal Belgian Football Association) Pibo Belisia Bilzen
4	FW	Omar Rahou	19 July 1992 (aged 33)	(Royal Belgian Football Association) Futsal Team Charleroi
6	FW	Gréllo	4 July 1985 (aged 40)	(Royal Belgian Football Association) RSCA Futsal
7	FW	Steven Dillien	24 February 1992 (aged 33)	(Royal Belgian Football Association) RSCA Futsal
8	FW	Ilias Bachar	20 February 2001 (aged 24)	(Royal Belgian Football Association) Futsal Topsport Antwerpen
9	FW	Benneth Vaelen	18 August 1995 (aged 30)	(Royal Belgian Football Association) Eisden Dorp
10	FW	Marvin Ghislandi	15 June 1999 (aged 26)	(Royal Belgian Football Association) Futsal Team Charleroi
11	FW	Jamal Aabbou	16 May 2000 (aged 25)	(Royal Belgian Football Association) Futsal Topsport Antwerpen
14	FW	Jasper Buyl	27 February 1997 (aged 28)	(Royal Belgian Football Association) Futsal Topsport Antwerpen
15	FW	Kenneth Vanderheyden	1 October 1999 (aged 26)	(Royal Belgian Football Association) RSCA Futsal
18	FW	Yassine Qoli	17 July 1992 (aged 33)	(Royal Belgian Football Association) Real Dev Vilvoorde

=== Slovenia ===
Head coach: Tomislav Horvat

No.	Pos.	Player	Date of birth (age)	Club
1	GK	Marko Peček	14 July 1993 (aged 32)	(Football Association of Slovenia) Dobovec
12	GK	Nejc Berzelak	3 May 1998 (aged 27)	(Football Association of Slovenia) Siliko Vrhnika
3	DF	Uroš Đurić	11 September 2000 (aged 25)	(Croatian Football Federation) Olmissum
7	DF	Igor Osredkar	28 June 1986 (aged 39)	(Football Association of Bosnia and Herzegovina) Bubamara Cazin
8	DF	Nejc Hozjan	31 July 1996 (aged 29)	(Croatian Football Federation) Osijek
10	DF	Žan Janež	16 September 2002 (aged 23)	(Croatian Football Federation) Futsal Pula Stanoinvest
11	DF	Lovro Trdin	8 July 2006 (aged 19)	(Football Association of Slovenia) Siliko Vrhnika
13	DF	Žiga Čeh	25 January 1995 (aged 30)	(Football Association of Bosnia and Herzegovina) Bubamara Cazin
2	FW	Teo Turk	15 March 1996 (aged 29)	(Croatian Football Federation) Rijeka
4	FW	Jure Suban	20 January 2003 (aged 23)	(Football Association of Slovenia) Siliko Vrhnika
5	FW	Luka Čop	19 November 2004 (aged 21)	(Croatian Football Federation) Futsal Dinamo
6	FW	Denis Kneževič	14 February 1998 (aged 27)	(Croatian Football Federation) Uspinjača Gimka
9	FW	Jeremy Bukovec	7 October 2000 (aged 25)	(Croatian Football Federation) Osijek
14	FW	Matej Fideršek	4 July 1991 (aged 34)	(Austrian Football Association) AFC Graz

=== Spain ===
Head coach: Jesús Velasco

No.	Pos.	Player	Date of birth (age)	Club
1	GK	Chemi Oliver	19 February 1996 (aged 29)	(Royal Spanish Football Federation) Cartagena
21	GK	Dídac Plana	22 May 1990 (aged 35)	(Royal Spanish Football Federation) Barcelona
3	DF	Ricardo Mayor	21 February 2000 (aged 25)	(Royal Spanish Football Federation) Elpozo Murcia
4	DF	Adri Rivera	11 January 2002 (aged 24)	(Royal Spanish Football Federation) Elpozo Murcia
6	DF	Antonio Pérez	19 October 2000 (aged 25)	(Royal Spanish Football Federation) Barcelona
7	DF	José Raya	8 May 1997 (aged 28)	(Royal Spanish Football Federation) Inter F. S.
13	DF	Miguel Mellado	23 July 1999 (aged 26)	(Royal Spanish Football Federation) Cartagena
2	FW	Cecilio Morales	6 July 1992 (aged 33)	(Royal Spanish Football Federation) Inter F. S.
8	FW	Adolfo Fernández	19 May 1993 (aged 32)	(Royal Spanish Football Federation) Barcelona
9	FW	Pablo Ramírez	25 February 2001 (aged 24)	(Royal Spanish Football Federation) Cartagena
10	FW	Mario Rivillos	13 December 1989 (aged 36)	(Royal Spanish Football Federation) Palma
11	FW	Francisco Cortés	13 October 1995 (aged 30)	(Royal Spanish Football Federation) Cartagena
14	FW	Jesús Gordillo	8 February 2001 (aged 24)	(Russian Football Union) Tyumen
20	FW	David Novoa	8 June 2002 (aged 23)	(Royal Spanish Football Federation) O Parrulo

== Group D ==
=== Hungary ===
Head coach: (Spain) Sergio Mullor

No.	Pos.	Player	Date of birth (age)	Club
1	GK	Marcell Alasztics	10 February 1995 (aged 30)	(Hungarian Football Federation) Á Stúdió Nyíregyháza
22	GK	Gergő Gémesi	20 June 2005 (aged 20)	(Hungarian Football Federation) Újpest
7	DF	Roland Bencsik	2 November 1995 (aged 30)	(Hungarian Football Federation) Kecskemét Futsal
8	DF	Zoltán Szalmás	11 May 2002 (aged 23)	(Hungarian Football Federation) Berettyóújfalu
9	DF	János Rábl	15 June 1989 (aged 36)	(Hungarian Football Federation) Berettyóújfalu
3	FW	Dávid Vatamaniuc-Bartha	29 August 2002 (aged 23)	(Hungarian Football Federation) Á Stúdió Nyíregyháza
4	FW	Márk Fekete	11 April 2000 (aged 25)	(Hungarian Football Federation) Kecskemét Futsal
5	FW	Rafael Henrique da Silva	20 June 1996 (aged 29)	(Hungarian Football Federation) Á Stúdió Nyíregyháza
10	FW	Patrik Pál	8 June 1997 (aged 28)	(Hungarian Football Federation) Újpest
11	FW	Balázs Rutai	12 February 1998 (aged 27)	(Hungarian Football Federation) Kecskemét Futsal
13	FW	Máté Suscsák	18 March 1998 (aged 27)	(Hungarian Football Federation) Újpest
15	FW	Mátyás Kajtár	16 December 2005 (aged 20)	
16	FW	Baltazár Büki	19 July 1995 (aged 30)	(Hungarian Football Federation) Aramis
17	FW	Lajos Szabó	7 April 2001 (aged 24)	(Hungarian Football Federation) Berettyóújfalu

=== Italy ===
Head coach: Salvatore Samperi

No.	Pos.	Player	Date of birth (age)	Club
1	GK	Carlos Dalcin	10 November 1992 (aged 33)	(Italian Football Federation) Eboli
12	GK	Jurij Bellobuono	22 January 1998 (aged 27)	(Italian Football Federation) Napoli
5	DF	Venancio Baldasso	1 July 1993 (aged 32)	(Italian Football Federation) Eboli
6	DF	Giovanni Pulvirenti	19 February 1996 (aged 29)	(Italian Football Federation) Catania
4	FW	Italo Rossetti	10 November 1992 (aged 33)	(Italian Football Federation) Sporting Sala Consilina
7	FW	Giuliano Fortini	8 September 1996 (aged 29)	(Italian Football Federation) L84 Torino
9	FW	Francesco Liberti	22 November 1995 (aged 30)	(Italian Football Federation) L84 Torino
10	FW	Alex Merlim	15 July 1986 (aged 39)	(Portuguese Football Federation) Sporting
11	FW	Julio De Oliveira	8 June 1991 (aged 34)	(Italian Football Federation) Genzano
14	FW	Gabriel Motta	16 August 1999 (aged 26)	(Royal Spanish Football Federation) Cartagena
16	FW	Fabricio Calderolli	22 January 1986 (aged 39)	(Italian Football Federation) Eboli
17	FW	Luis Turmena	10 January 1991 (aged 35)	(Italian Football Federation) Catania
22	FW	Carmelo Musumeci	17 December 1991 (aged 34)	(Italian Football Federation) Catania
24	FW	Matheus Barichello	11 September 1995 (aged 30)	(Italian Football Federation) Genzano

=== Poland ===
Head coach: Błażej Korczyński

No.	Pos.	Player	Date of birth (age)	Club
1	GK	Michał Kałuża	22 July 1998 (aged 27)	(Polish Football Association) Rekord Bielsko-Biała
23	GK	Michał Widuch	11 April 1992 (aged 33)	(Polish Football Association) Piast Gliwice
2	DF	Michał Kubik	7 May 1990 (aged 35)	(Polish Football Association) AZS UŚ Katowice
6	DF	Paweł Kaniewski	20 October 1995 (aged 30)	(Polish Football Association) KS Constract Lubawa
8	DF	Sebastian Grubalski	1 November 1999 (aged 26)	(Polish Football Association) KS Constract Lubawa
13	DF	Tomasz Kriezel	5 November 1993 (aged 32)	(Polish Football Association) Piast Gliwice
15	DF	Grzegorz Haraburda	7 June 2006 (aged 19)	(Polish Football Association) Rekord Bielsko-Biała
16	DF	Maciej Jankowski	5 March 1999 (aged 26)	(Polish Football Association) FC Reiter Toruń
3	FW	Mateusz Madziąg	17 November 1999 (aged 26)	(Polish Football Association) We-Met Gmina Sierakowice
4	FW	Piotr Skiepko	25 February 1995 (aged 30)	(Polish Football Association) Jagiellonia Białystok
7	FW	Mikołaj Zastawnik	2 September 1996 (aged 29)	(Polish Football Association) Rekord Bielsko-Biała
9	FW	Kacper Pawlus	9 August 2006 (aged 19)	(Polish Football Association) Rekord Bielsko-Biała
10	FW	Sebastian Leszczak	20 January 1992 (aged 34)	(Polish Football Association) BSF ABJ Powiat Bochnia
14	FW	Michał Marek	4 July 1993 (aged 32)	(Polish Football Association) Rekord Bielsko-Biała

=== Portugal ===
Head coach: Jorge Braz

No.	Pos.	Player	Date of birth (age)	Club
1	GK	Edu	19 August 1996 (aged 29)	(Royal Spanish Football Federation) ElPozo Murcia
12	GK	Bernardo Paçó	19 April 2000 (aged 25)	(Portuguese Football Federation) Sporting
2	DF	André Coelho	30 October 1993 (aged 32)	(Portuguese Football Federation) Benfica
3	DF	Tomás Paçó	19 April 2000 (aged 25)	(Portuguese Football Federation) Sporting
4	DF	Afonso	6 January 1998 (aged 28)	(Portuguese Football Federation) Benfica
8	DF	Erick	21 July 1995 (aged 30)	(Royal Spanish Football Federation) FC Barcelona
9	DF	Diogo Santos	7 November 2002 (aged 23)	(Portuguese Football Federation) Sporting
10	DF	Bruno Coelho	1 August 1987 (aged 38)	(Latvian Football Federation) Riga FC
5	FW	Rúben Góis	13 September 2001 (aged 24)	(Portuguese Football Federation) Rio Ave
6	FW	Kutchy	12 October 2002 (aged 23)	(Portuguese Football Federation) Benfica
7	FW	Lúcio Rocha	5 May 2004 (aged 21)	(Portuguese Football Federation) Benfica
11	FW	Pany	25 February 1989 (aged 36)	(Portuguese Football Federation) Benfica
13	FW	Tiago Brito	22 July 1991 (aged 34)	(Portuguese Football Federation) Braga
14	FW	Pauleta	12 June 1994 (aged 31)	(Portuguese Football Federation) Sporting
