= FK Kauno Žalgiris (futsal) =

Lithuanian futsal club

- Full name: FK Kauno Žalgiris futsal komanda
- Founded: 2013
- Ground: Kaunas Sports Hall; Žalgirio treniruočių centras; Garliavos arena
- Chairman: Darius Gurskis
- Manager: (Brazil) Emerson Junior De Lima ("Dentinho")
- League: Futsal A lyga
- 2024-25: Champions
Home colours	Away colours

FK Kauno Žalgiris is a professional futsal club from Kaunas, Lithuania. The club has been dominating Lithuanian Futsal A Lyga and the Lithuanian Futsal Cup, and is a regular to the main round of the UEFA Futsal Champions League. The club was known as FK Vytis futsal before an acquisition by basketball and football club Kauno Žalgiris

== History ==
=== FK Vytis ===
FK Vytis futsal was founded in 2013. The club's predecessor history is intertwined with two other Kaunas teams Atletas and Inkaras, whose football, futsal and beach football teams merged, split, fell apart and got re-established. Vytis got stronger within next three years, and won their first domestic league and cup double in 2016–2017 season. The club became the dominant force in Lithuanian futsal, winning 6 league titles in a row, including 5 league and cup doubles.

=== FK Kauno Žalgiris ===
In October 2020 Kaunas sports organisation Žalgiris announced that FK Vytis will join its structure, which already include BC Žalgiris basketball, FK Kauno Žalgiris football clubs as well as respective youth academies. Kauno Žalgiris club aimed to create a complete "football pyramid", and did not yet have a futsal team. 2021 February 26 the club officially changed its name, until then it was prevented by the requirement of the UEFA Futsal Champions League for clubs not to change names while a season is ongoing.

In 2021 the club signed a number of Brazilians, including team manager Dentinho, who was also offered to simultaneously manage Lithuania national futsal team. In 2022 the club signed Ricardo, a son of famous footballer Cacau.

=== UEFA Futsal Champions League ===
Vytis started participating in the UEFA Futsal Champions League, and reached the elite round in its second season in European competitions. Vytis was hoping for even better results next season, having signed 6 players from Brazil in 2019. It was not to be, and the Brazilians, including a coach, left at the end of the season. Despite this, Vytis/Kauno Žalgiris has played 5 times in a row in the main round of the UEFA Futsal Champions League. The club reached the best of 16 in the 2020-21 season, and was ranking #9 in the top European club ranking.

== Achievements ==
- Futsal A Lyga:
  - Winners (9): 2016–17, 2017–18, 2018–19, 2019–20, 2020–21, 2021–22, 2022-23, 2023-24, 2024-25
- LFF Futsal Cup :
  - Winners (7): 2016–17, 2017–18, 2018–19, 2019–20, 2020–21, 2022-23, 2023-24
- LFF Futsal Supercup :
  - Winners (4): 2022, 2023, 2024, 2025

== Managers ==
From	To	Manager
	March 2018	(Lithuania) Mindaugas Grigalevičius
March 2018	September 2018	(Ukraine) Pavel Pikalov
September 2018	October 2019	(Brazil) Luciano Mistura
November 2019	August 2021	(Ukraine) Kirill Krasiy
August 2021		(Brazil) Emerson Junior De Lima ("Dentinho")

== Squad ==
As of 1 October 2025

Note: Flags indicate national team as defined under FIFA eligibility rules; some limited exceptions apply. Players may hold more than one non-FIFA nationality.

No.	Pos.	Nation	Player
1	GK	LTU	Ernestas Macenis
2	GK	BRA	Jordan Lucca Dutra Ramos Neves
4		BRA	Filipe Da Silva Santana
5		LTU	Vladimiras Derendiajevas
6		LTU	Tomas Bučma
7	DF	LTU	Benas Spietinis
8		LTU	Albert Voskunovič
9		LTU	Justinas Zagurskas
10	MF	LTU	Edgaras Baranauskas
11	MF	LTU	Lukas Sendžikas (captain)
14	DF	LTU	Emilijus Rusteika

No.	Pos.	Nation	Player
15		BRA	Vinicius Carvalho Feitosa
16		BRA	Pedro Victor Macedo Da Silva
17		UKR	Kostiantyn Bondarenko
19		BRA	Joao Vitor De Souza Pereira
21	GK	LTU	Ernestas Lukaševič
—	MF	LTU	Edas Romanovas
—		BRA	Jordan Lucca Dutra Ramos Neves
—		LTU	Naglis Gurskis
—		LTU	Dovydas Jurevičius
—		LTU	Mantas Karenga
—		LTU	Tautvydas Statkus

== See also ==
- FK Kauno Žalgiris
- FK Žalgiris
