= Kiili =

Borough in Estonia

- Borough
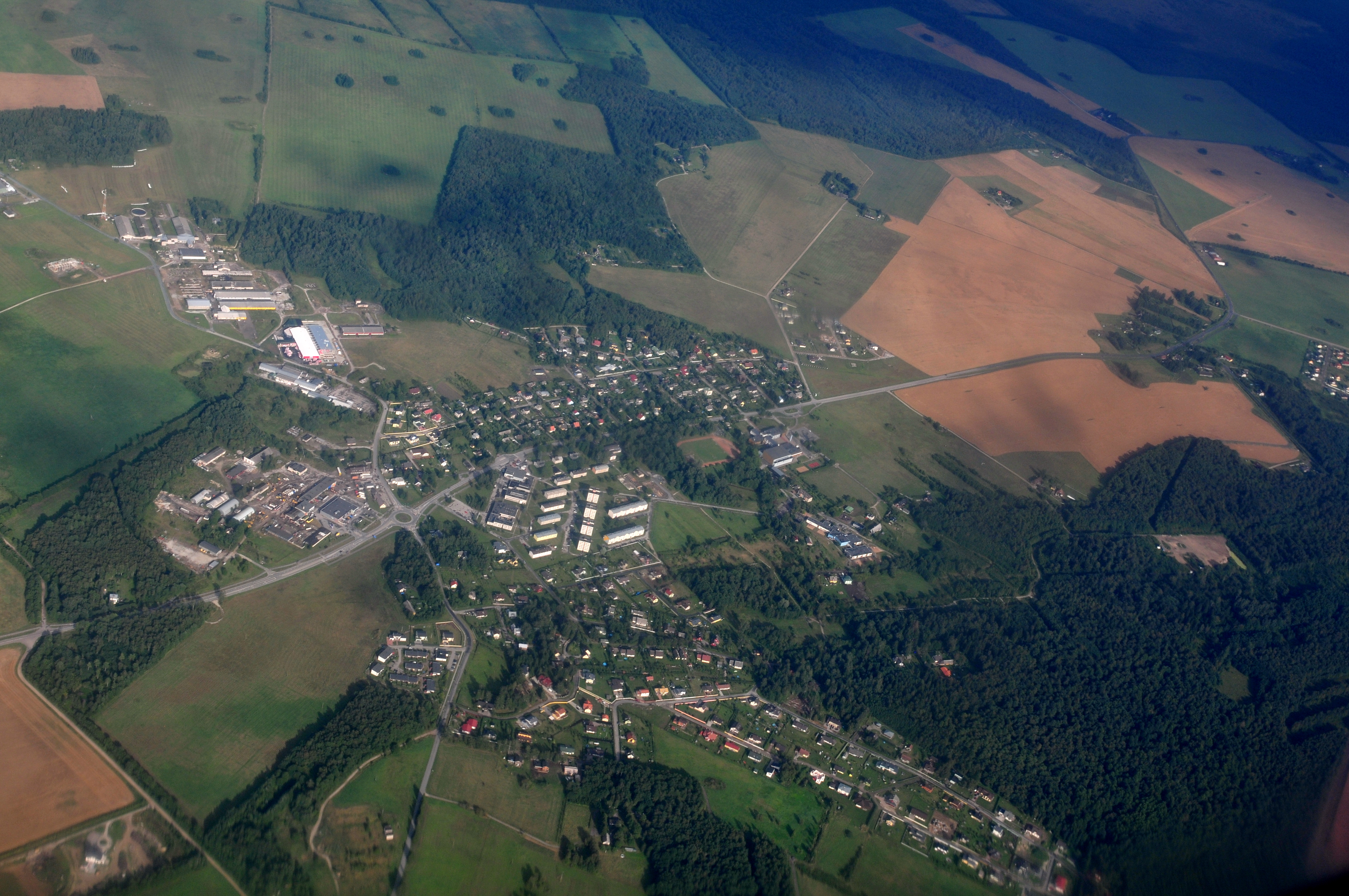
- Aerial view of Kiili.

- Location in Estonia
- Coordinates: 59°18′21″N 24°50′26″E
- Country: Estonia
- County: Harju County
- Municipality: Kiili Parish
- First mentioned: 1750 (as Wenne Külla)

Population (2019)
  - Total: 1,584

Kiili (before 1977: Veneküla) is a borough of Harju County in northern Estonia. It is the administrative center of Kiili Parish and has a population of 1,492 as of 2015.
