= Ogre, Latvia =

State city and capital of Ogre Municipality, Latvia

Ogre
- State city
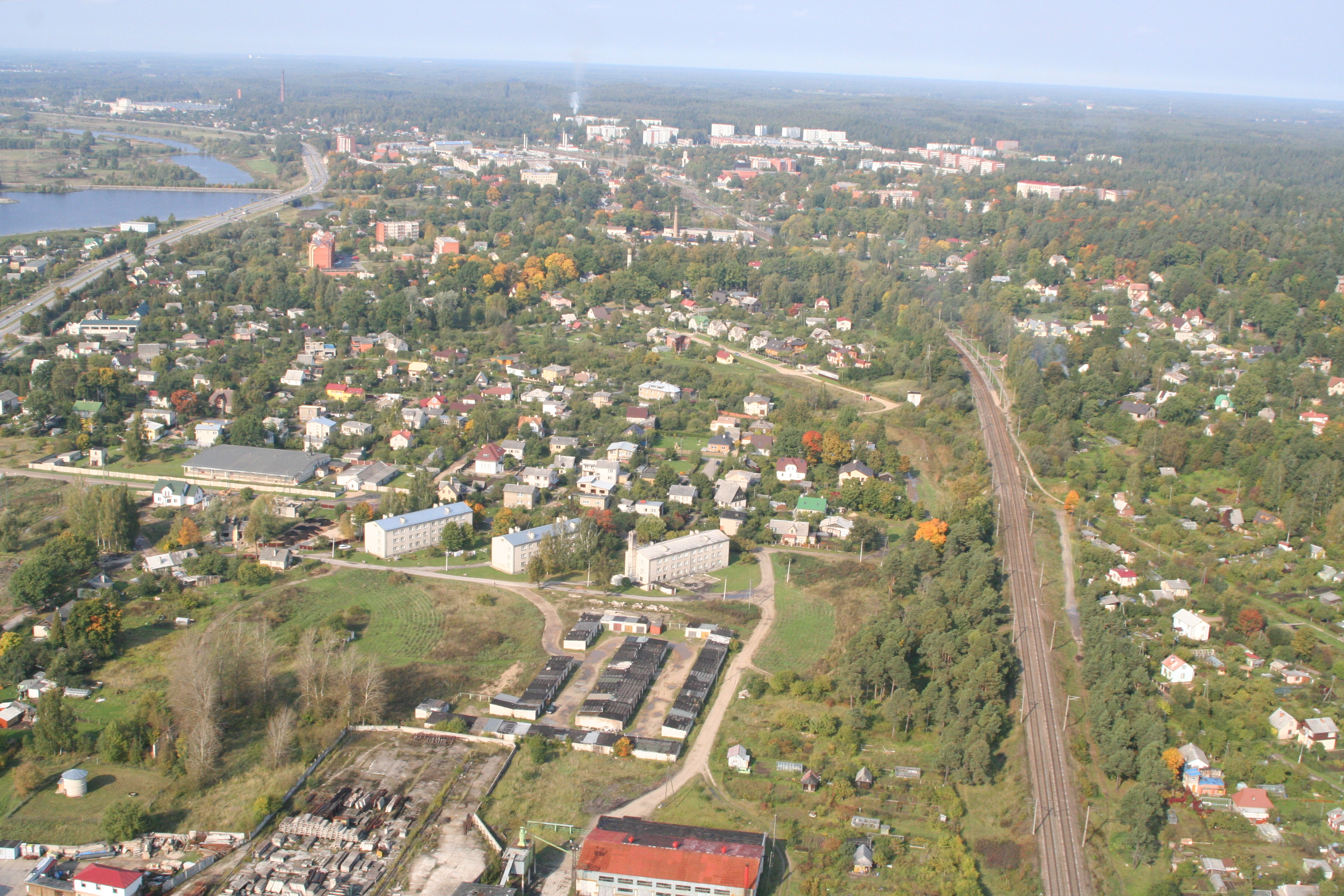
- Aerial view of Ogre

- Flag Coat of arms

- Location in Latvia
- Coordinates: 56°49′07″N 24°36′20″E
- Country: Latvia
- District: Ogre Municipality
- Town rights: 1928

Government
  - Mayor: Andris Krauja

Area
  - Total: 16.18 km^{2} (6.25 sq mi)
  - Land: 14.34 km^{2} (5.54 sq mi)
  - Water: 1.84 km^{2} (0.71 sq mi)

Population (2026)
  - Total: 22,499
  - Density: 1,569/km^{2} (4,064/sq mi)

GDP
  - State city: 212,786,000 euro (2021)
  - Per capita: 9,289 euro (2021)
- Time zone: UTC+2 (EET)
  - Summer (DST): UTC+3 (EEST)
- Postal code: LV-500(1-3)
- Calling code: +371 650
- Number of city council members: 13

Ogre is the state city in Ogre Municipality in the Vidzeme region of Latvia, 36 kilometres (22 miles) east of the capital Riga, and is situated at the confluence of the Daugava and Ogre rivers. It has been a city since 1928. The population in 2020 was 23,273. It is a state city (although without a separate municipal government), and is the seat of Ogre Municipality. Previously, it also served as the seat of Ogre district.

Ogre is composed of three parts: Jaunogre (meaning "New Ogre"), Ogre (the center of the city), and Pārogre (meaning "Ogre across [the river]" though not all the named region is across the river).

The name of the city comes from the Ogre river. The Ogre village was first mentioned in 1206, called "Oger" in German. In 1861, when the Riga–Daugavpils Railway was built, Riga's residents started to build summer cottages here. In 1862 Ogre became a health resort.

The city's coat of arms was granted in 1938, and shows the river and pinewoods of Ogre. There is a cultural centre, an art school and a music school in Ogre. It has three Latvian language schools, and one Russian language school — Jaunogre Secondary School.

The city also has a cemetery with the remains of German soldiers who died during the First and Second World Wars, or died in captivity between 1944 and 1951.

Ogre is the home city for the 2016–2017 Latvian ice hockey champions HK Kurbads.

== Etymology ==
There are three main versions of the etymology of Ogre's name (both town and river). The first states that the name of the river from which this city derives its name is of Russian origin (угри, ugri, meaning "eels") because there used to be many eels in the river Ogre. A popular folk legend says that Catherine the Great of Russia was the one who gave the river this name because there were a lot of eels in the river; however, this lacks any evidence. Whereas Estonian linguist Paul Alvre takes into consideration an older form of the Ogre river's name (Wogene, Woga) first found in Livonian Chronicle of Henry (1180–1227), and argues that it cognates with Estonian word voog (with possible meanings: "stream, flow, waves"), therefore showing connection with Finno-Ugric languages, most probably early Livonian language.

A third etymology gives a reconstructed form *Vingrē, related to Lithuanian vingrùs, "meandering, curly" or Latvian vingrs, "nimble;" thus meaning "the meandering river"; the village of Engure has the same root.

== Sports ==
Ice hockey, basketball and handball are the most popular sports in Ogre.

Ice hockey club Essamika won the only Latvian Hockey Higher League championship title up to this day. In later years, Ogre had acquired 8 silver medals: 5 with ASK/Ogre and 3 with HK Kurbads.

Ogre has a Latvian Basketball League and Baltic Basketball League team, the BK Ogre/Kumho Tyre, which entered the Latvian highest league after winning the gold in Latvian second league.

Ogre's handball team HK Ogre/Miandum has won multiple medals in the Latvian Handball Higher League and won the silver medal at the 2013–14 season as the highest achievement.

FK Ogre, the city's main association football club, plays in the Latvian First League.

== Gallery ==
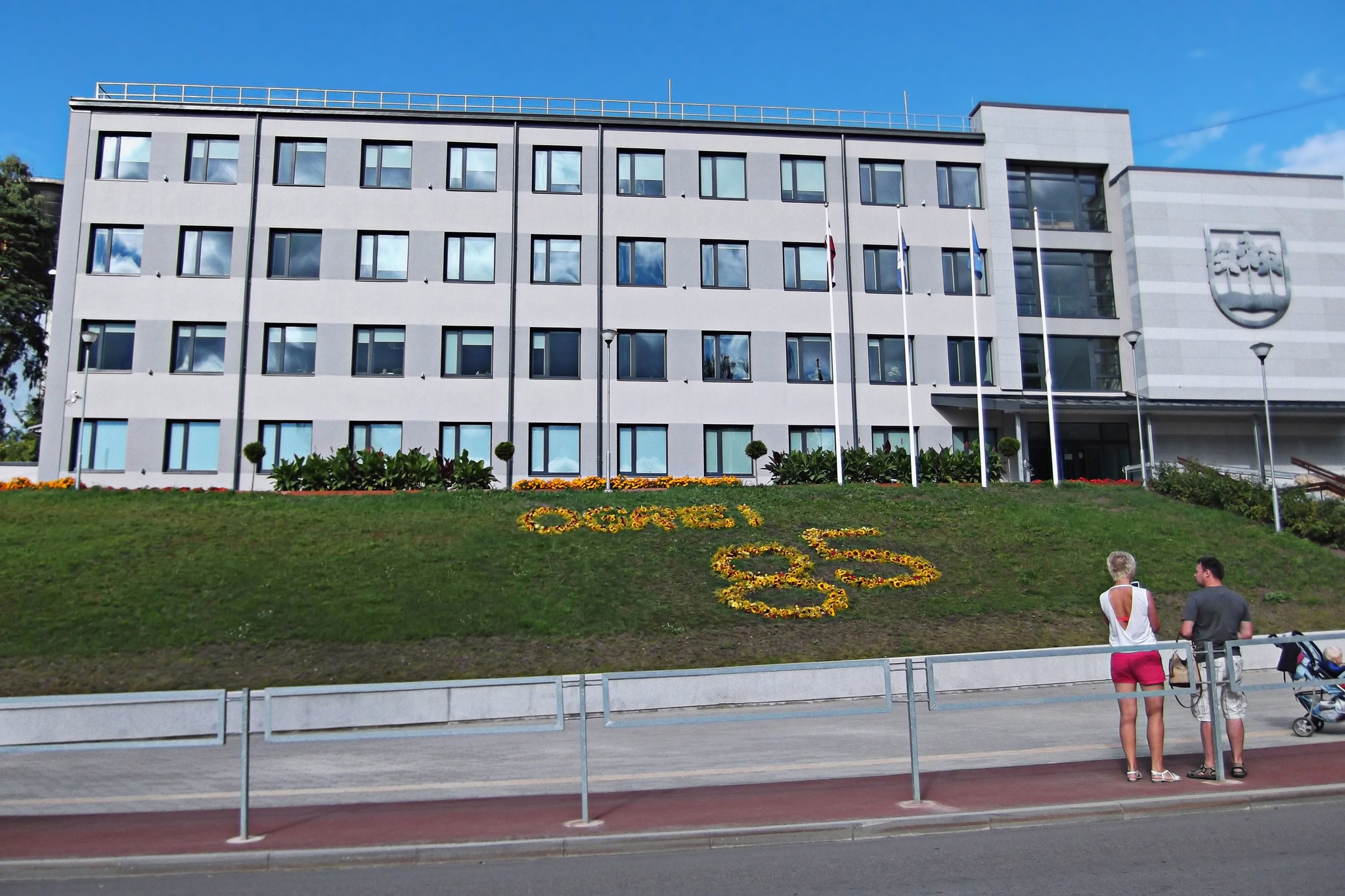
Ogre city council

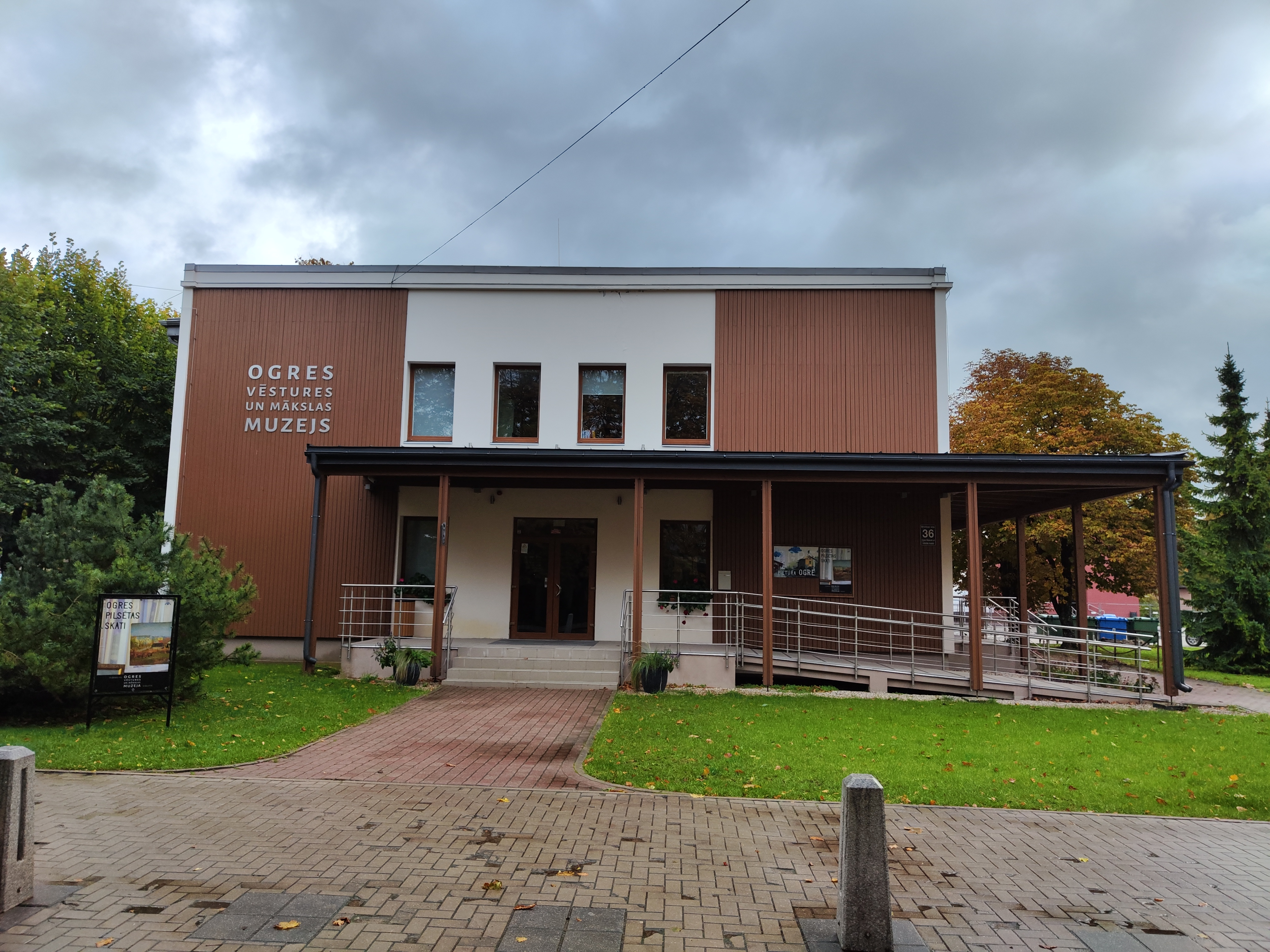
Ogre History and Art museum

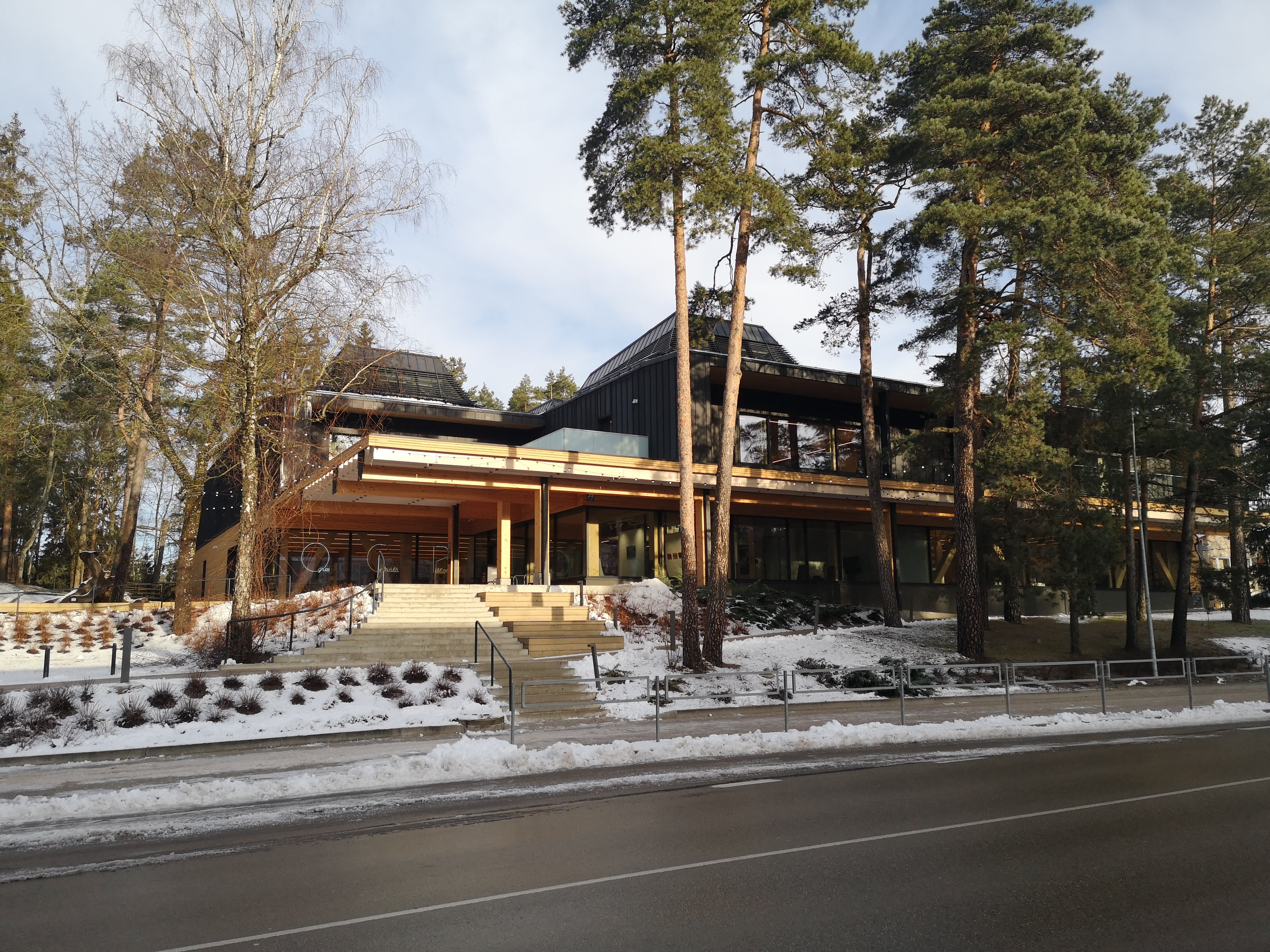
Ogre central library

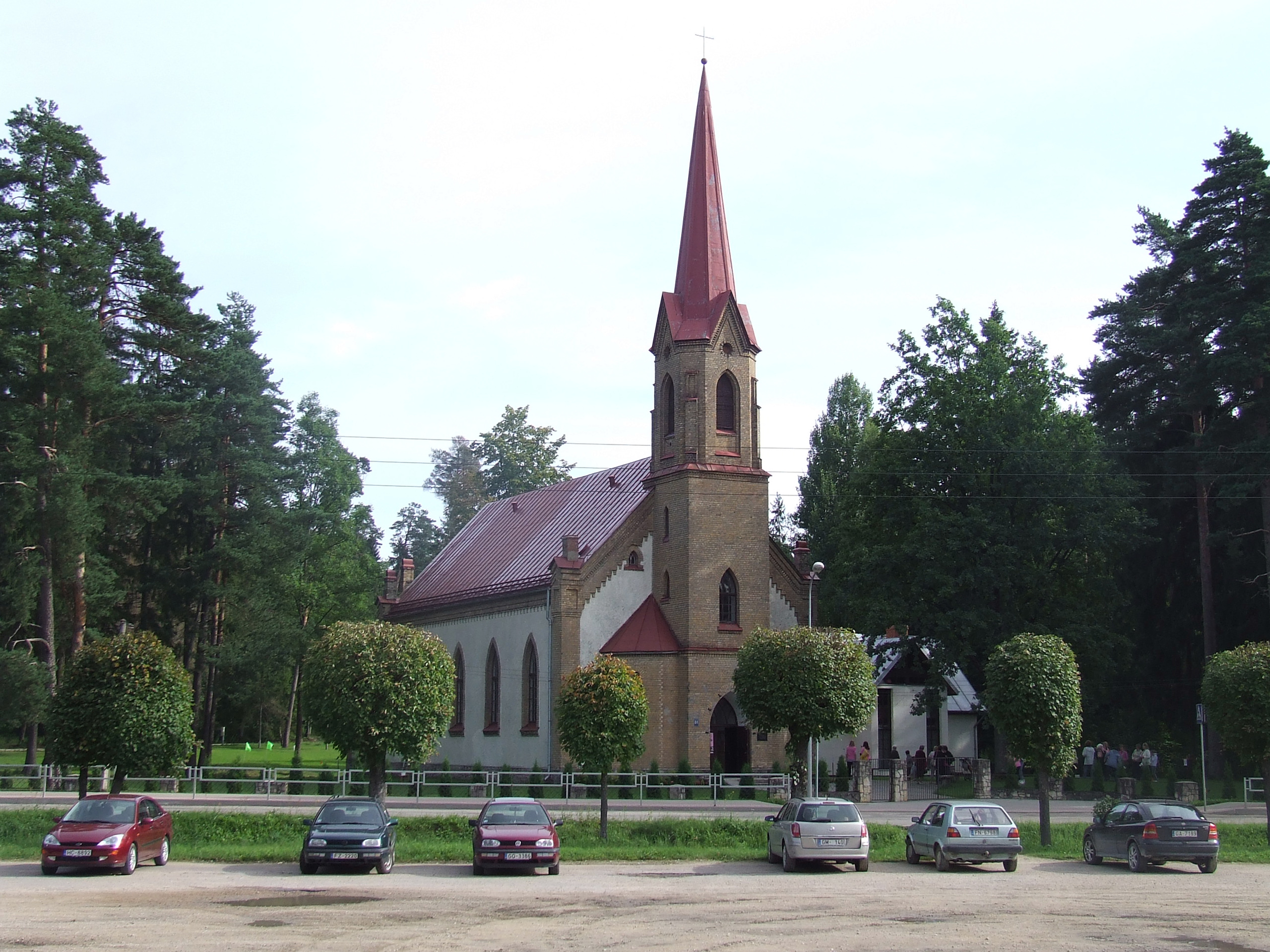
Ogre lutheran church

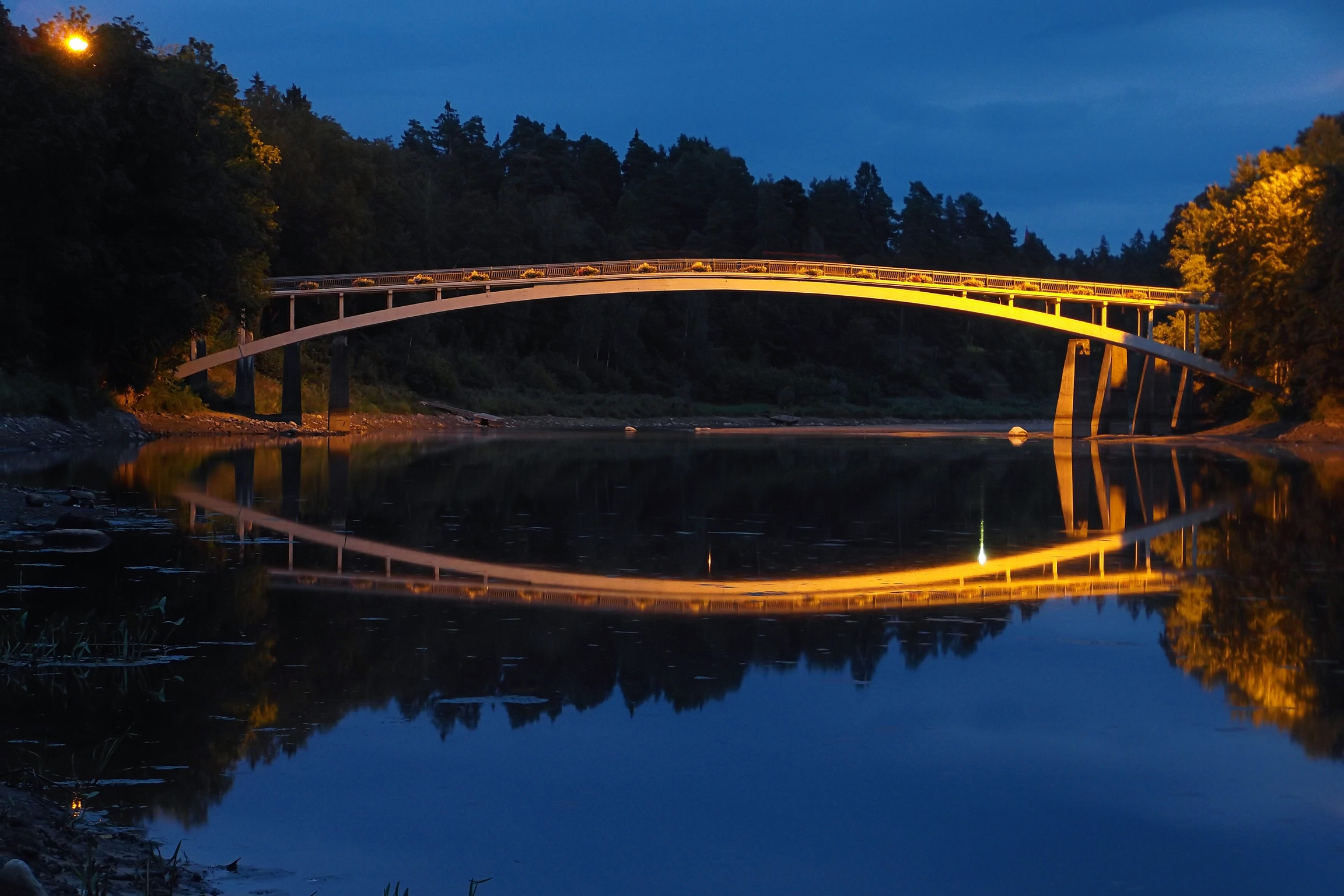
Arched pedestrian bridge over Ogre river.

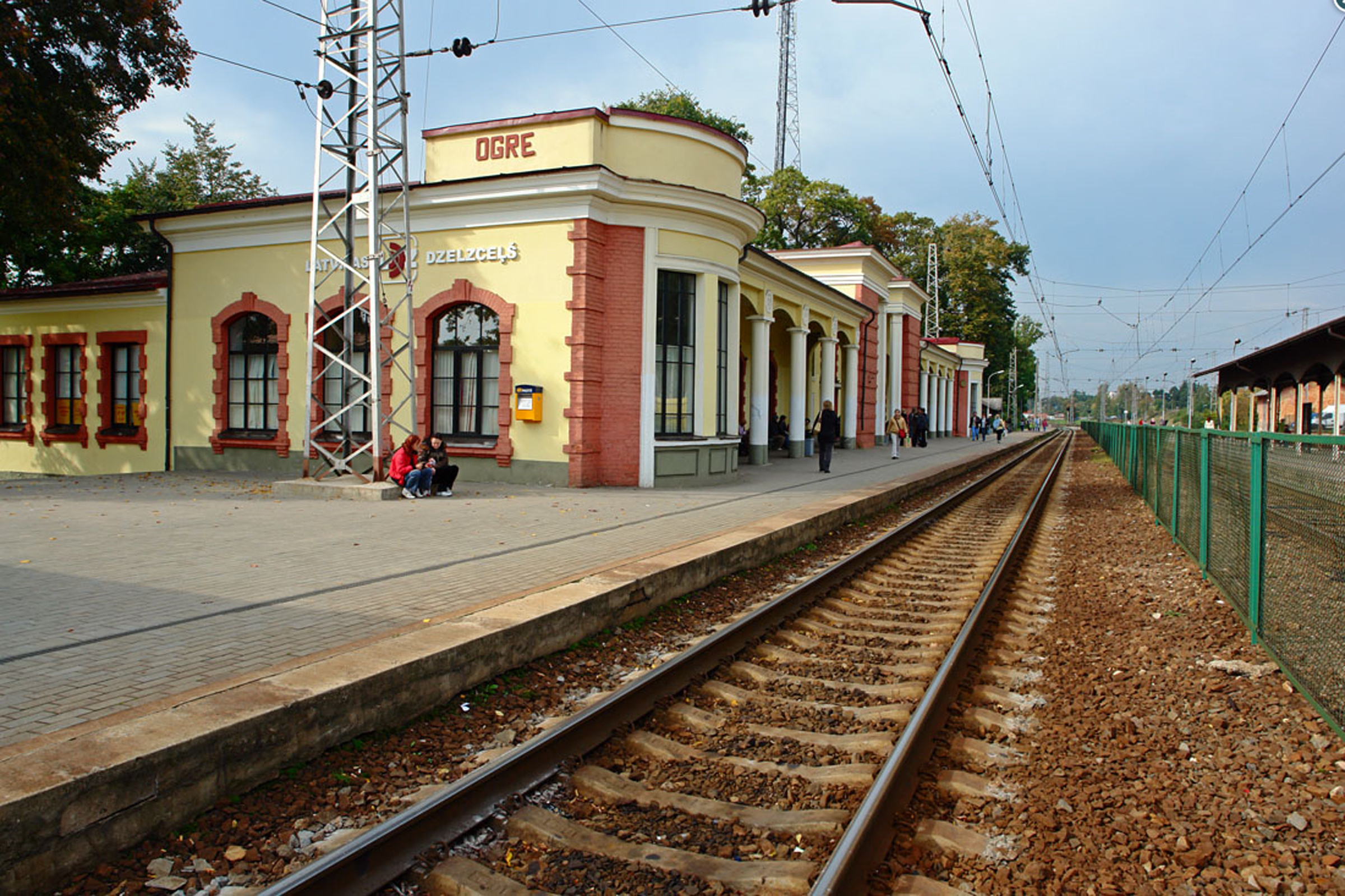
Ogre railway station

== Notable people ==
- Eliza Legzdina (born 1993), musician, singer, songwriter and rapper

=== Sport ===
- Raivis Vidzis (born 1976), strongman competitor, twice title-holder of the World Strongman Cup
- Igors Stepanovs (born 1976), football coach, played 306 games and 100 for Latvia
- Andrejs Prohorenkovs (1977–2025), footballer, played over 350 games and 32 for Latvia
- Kaspars Dumpis (born 1982), former luger, competed at the 2006 Winter Olympics
- Kaspars Bērziņš (born 1985), basketball player
- Oskars Bārtulis (born 1987), ice hockey player
- Anete Šteinberga (born 1990), basketball player

== Twin towns – sister cities ==
See twin towns of Ogre Municipality.

== Sources ==
- Alvre, Paul Eesti ja liivi keeleaines Henriku Liivimaa kroonikas (III) (Keel ja Kirjandus, 1985)
