= Latvia national futsal team =

Latvia
- Nickname(s): 11vilki
- Association: Latvian Football Federation
- Confederation: UEFA (Europe)
- Head coach: (Italy) Massimiliano Bellarte
- Captain: Germans Matjušenko
- Most caps: Aigars Bondars (86)
- Top scorer: Maksims Seņs (40)
- FIFA code: LVA
- FIFA ranking: 42 ▲10 (8 May 2026)
Home colours	Away colours

First international
- Latvia 0–0 Azerbaijan (Liège, Belgium; 7 December 1998)

Biggest win
- Latvia 13–0 Estonia (Ogre, Latvia; 26 December 2008)

Biggest defeat
- Latvia 1–10 Ukraine (Andorra la Vella, Andorra; 28 September 2000)

FIFA World Cup
- Appearances: 0

UEFA Futsal Championship
- Appearances: 1 (First in 2026)

The Latvian national futsal team is governed by the Latvian Football Federation, the governing body for futsal in Latvia and represents the country in international futsal competitions, such as the World Cup and the European Championships.

Latvia will make their international futsal debut at the UEFA Futsal Euro in 2026 as co-host alongside Lithuania national futsal team.

The president of the Latvian Football Federation, Vadims Ļašenko, also played for the Latvia national futsal team for several years, making 42 appearances.

== History ==
Futsal in Latvia was officially organized and played according to international rules only after the country regained its independence.

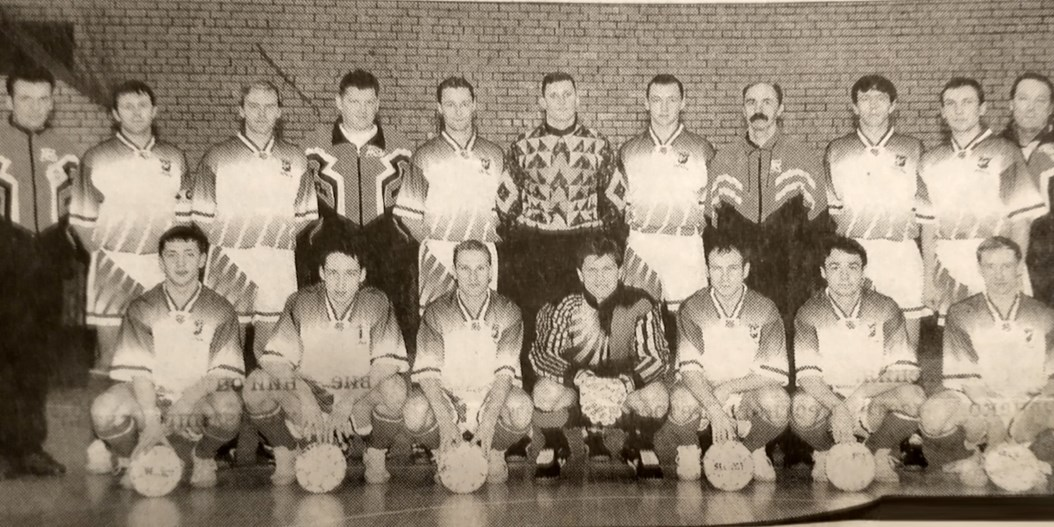
First and historic Latvia national futsal team squad

In 1992, the Latvian national futsal team was established and participated in an international tournament in Moscow, where they lost to teams from the Commonwealth of Independent States and Italy but secured a victory against Slovakia.

In December 1998, Latvia made its debut in the UEFA European Championship qualification tournament in Belgium. Their first match ended in a 0–0 draw against Azerbaijan, followed by a 2–3 loss to the hosts, Belgium. The Latvian national team has participated in the UEFA European Championship qualification tournament 11 times, advancing past the preliminary round on five occasions. In total, Latvia has played 49 matches in European Championship qualification, recording 16 wins, 7 draws, and 26 losses. The team secured its first victory in an official qualification match in January 2007, defeating Bulgaria (2–0) and later England (5–1). In 2009, Latvia advanced past the preliminary round for the first time, overcoming Estonia, Armenia, and Bulgaria. However, in the main qualification round, the team did not secure a spot in the final tournament.

In January 2000, Latvia participated in the FIFA Futsal World Cup qualification tournament for the first time, suffering defeats in all four matches (against Russia, Poland, Belgium, and North Macedonia). A significant milestone for Latvian futsal came in November 2003 when the FIFA World Cup qualification tournament was held at the Riga Sports Arena (Rīgas Nacionālā sporta manēža). During this event, Latvia put up a respectable performance against the reigning world champions, Spain, losing by a narrow 1–3 margin.

In October 2011, playing in Jelgava, Latvia advanced past the first round of the FIFA World Cup preliminary qualifiers for the first time, defeating England and San Marino while drawing against Cyprus. However, in the main qualification round, Latvia was unable to progress beyond the group stage, drawing with Hungary and Kazakhstan but losing to Russia, which later qualified for the final tournament.

Latvia's national futsal team is the most successful team in the Baltic Futsal Cup, winning six out of the nine tournaments held. The competition traditionally includes futsal teams from Lithuania and Estonia.

== UEFA Futsal EURO 2026 ==
Latvia national futsal team will make its debut in the UEFA Futsal Euro 2026, the most prestigious futsal competition in Europe.

In 2022, Latvia and Lithuania submitted a joint bid to host the final tournament, and in December 2023 UEFA confirmed that both countries would be the hosts. As host nations, Latvia and Lithuania were granted automatic qualification for the final tournament.

In 2025, complications arose when Belarus qualified for the finals. Latvian legislation prohibited Belarus from playing matches in Latvia, and Lithuania also refused to host the team. UEFA decided to involve Slovenia as an additional host country, ensuring that Belarus would play its group stage matches there. As a result, the Belarus group will be drawn separately to avoid matches against Latvia or Lithuania in the group stage.

Latvia made an impressive start to their debut in front of their home crowd at a UEFA final tournament. In the opening match, Latvia defeated Georgia 4–0. The first goal in Latvia's history at a UEFA major tournament was scored by Germans Matjušenko. Two goals were scored by Latvia's “golden boy” Edgars Tarakanovs, while Andrejs Baklanovs added one more. Edgars Tarakanovs was named the Most Valuable Player (MVP) of the match.

== Coaching history ==
The first head coach of the Latvian national futsal team in 1992 was Sergejs Jablokovs.

From 2003 until the end of 2021, the team's head coach was Artūrs Šketovs, who spent most of his playing career in traditional football but also briefly played for the Latvia national futsal team toward the end of his career.

At the beginning of 2022, a coaching change took place, with Portuguese coach Orlando Duarte taking over. However, after six months, he was replaced by Montenegrin specialist Vasko Vujović, who signed a contract under a 1+1 year system.

In the summer of 2024, as part of preparations for UEFA Futsal Euro 2026, Italian futsal specialist Massimiliano Bellarte was appointed as the head coach.

== Major Competitions in Latvia ==
The main futsal competition in Latvia is the Virslīga Championship, which has been held since 1997. The Virslīga consists of a regular season followed by playoff matches, where the two best teams compete in the final series, played in a best-of-five format.

In the 2024/2025 season, ten teams participated in the Virslīga.

Currently, Riga-based clubs FK RFS Futsal and Riga FC Futsal Futsal traditionally dominate the competition. However, over the years, teams from Daugavpils, Jūrmala, Jelgava, Ventspils, Rēzekne, Spuņciems, and Jēkabpils have also won medals in the league.

== Notable Latvian Futsal Players ==
Since 2011, the Latvian Football Federation (LFF) has awarded the title of the Best Latvian Futsal Player of the Year.

The most frequent recipient of this honor is forward Maksims Seņs, who has won the award four times, including three consecutive years (2011 and 2013–2015). Seņs has also been the top scorer of the Latvian Virslīga six times, playing for both of Latvia's strongest futsal clubs—RABA and Nikars. Aigars Bondars is the most capped player in the history of the Latvian national futsal team, having played 86 matches and received the best futsal player award in 2012.

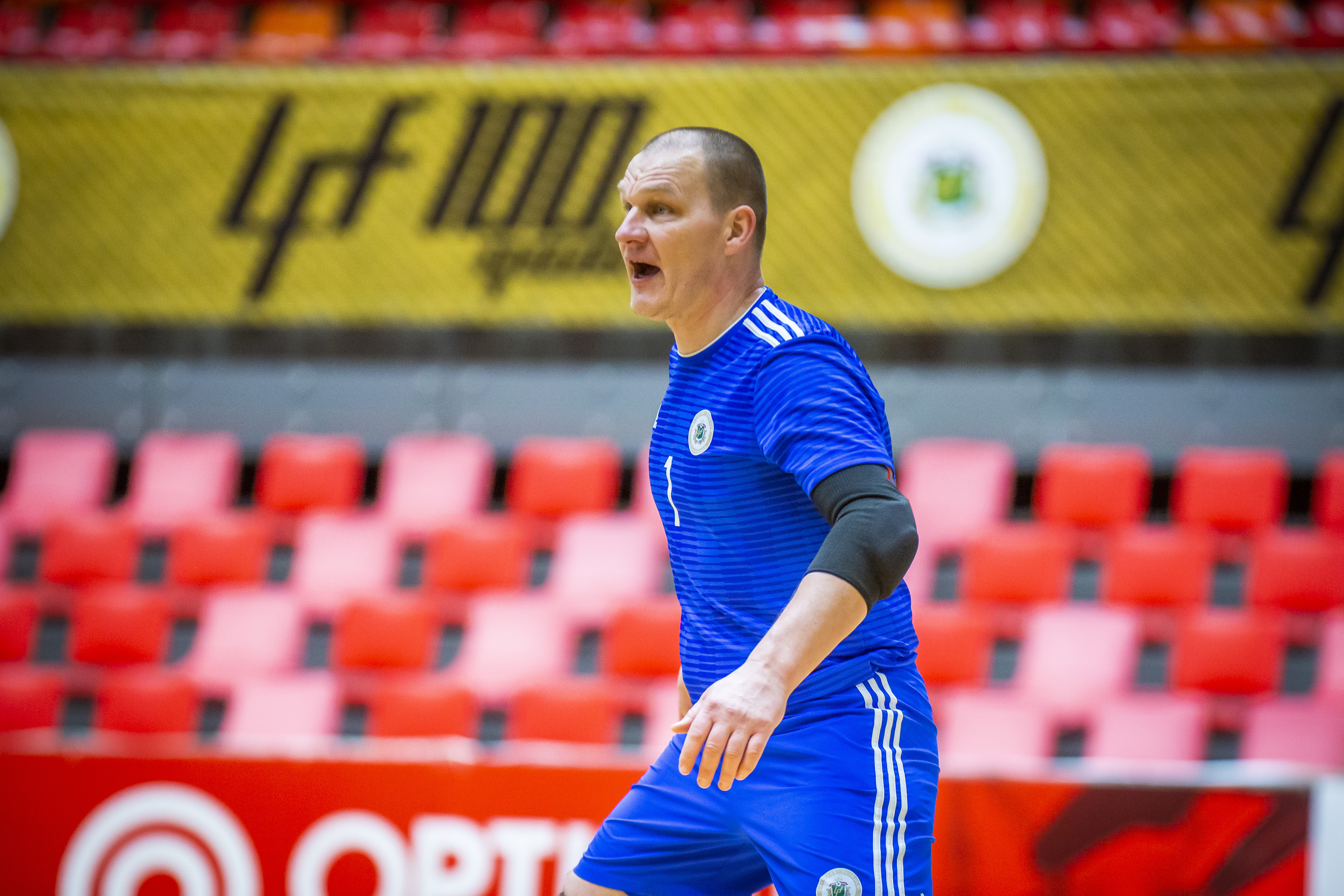
Aigars Bondars - Most capped Latvia futsal national team player

Germans Matjušenko – three-time recipient (2018, 2019, 2021). Andrejs Aleksejevs – two-time recipient (2016, 2017). Miks Babris – awarded in 2020 and 2022. Artjoms Kozlovskis – named the best player in 2023. Edgars Tarakanovs – received the title for the first time in 2024.

== Notable Teams ==
The most successful futsal club in Latvia was FK Nikars, a Riga-based football club that won the Latvian championship title 12 consecutive times (2008–2019). During this period, Portuguese futsal specialist Orlando Duarte (Orlando Francisco Alves Duarte), who had previously won FIFA Futsal World Cup medals with Portugal national futsal team, coached Nikars for seven years.

FK Nikars also competed in the UEFA Futsal Cup for 11 seasons, advancing past the main qualification round five times to reach the Elite Round, where the top 16 teams in the tournament compete. In 2017, Nikars achieved its highest European ranking, placing 7th in the UEFA futsal rankings. However, in 2019, due to financial difficulties, the club withdrew from the Latvian Virslīga. One year later, Nikars returned to top-level Latvian futsal as part of the FC RFS Futsal structure.

The second most successful Latvian futsal team is RABA, another Riga-based club, which has won the Latvian championship three times. In 2021, RABA reclaimed the championship title after a 15-year gap. Additionally, RABA has finished as runners-up in the Latvian championship ten times.

== Players ==
=== Current squad ===
The following players were called up to the squad for the 2028 FIFA Futsal World Cup qualifying matches against San Marino, Cyprus and Albania on 9, 10 and 12 April 2026 respectively.

No.	Pos.	Player	Date of birth (age)	Caps	Goals	Club
23	GK	Igors Labuts	7 June 1990 (age 36)	29	0	(Latvian Football Federation) Riga Futsal Club
25	GK	Rainers Mūrnieks	27 July 2004 (age 22)	30	1	(Latvian Football Federation) Riga Futsal Club
4	DF	Ņikita Jelagovs	4 April 2003 (age 23)	32	0	(Latvian Football Federation) TFK Beitar
11	DF	Miks Babris	3 October 1999 (age 26)	65	19	(Italian Football Federation) CDM Futsal Genova
13	DF	Vlads Rimkus	28 May 1993 (age 33)	30	1	(Latvian Football Federation) Riga Futsal Club
98	DF	Sergejs Motiļs	23 May 2006 (age 20)	24	2	(Latvian Football Federation) TFK Beitar
2	FW	Emīls Atamaņukovs	6 August 2007 (age 19)	14	0	(Italian Football Federation) Itar Futsal Fossano
6	FW	Renards Ūdris	20 December 2005 (age 20)	16	2	(Latvian Football Federation) Riga Futsal Club
8	FW	Andžejs Mickēvičs	1 April 2002 (age 24)	45	9	(Latvian Football Federation) Riga Futsal Club
9	FW	Viktors Kuļepovs	23 August 2001 (age 24)	26	12	(Latvian Football Federation) Riga Futsal Club
10	FW	Edgars Tarakanovs	15 February 2003 (age 23)	52	30	(Royal Belgian Football Association) RSC Anderlecht Futsal
17	FW	Artjoms Kozlovskis	19 July 2001 (age 25)	26	5	(Latvian Football Federation) Riga Futsal Club
18	FW	Andrejs Baklanovs (captain)	4 June 1998 (age 28)	66	38	(Italian Football Federation) CDM Futsal Genova
21	FW	Aleksandrs Kuļešovs	11 October 1995 (age 30)	49	5	(Latvian Football Federation) TFK Salaspils

=== Recent call-ups ===
The following players have also been called up to the squad within the last 12 months.

Pos.	Player	Date of birth (age)	Caps	Goals	Club	Latest call-up
GK	Maksims Troickis	21 August 2007 (age 18)	2	0	(Latvia) Riga Futsal Club	v. Lithuania, 20 December 2025
GK	Artjoms Križanovskis	12 November 1998 (age 27)			(Latvia) FC Nikers	v. Lithuania, 20 December 2025
DF	Artjoms Troickis	29 December 2001 (age 24)			(Poland) Jagiellonia Białystok	v. Lithuania, 20 December 2025
DF	Maksims Potlovs	28 September 1997 (age 28)			(Latvia) Daugavpils FS	v. Lithuania, 20 December 2025
FW	Germans Matjušenko	16 May 1994 (age 32)	83	32	(Latvia) Riga Futsal Club	UEFA Futsal Euro 2026
FW	Toms Kristians Grīslis	6 September 2002 (age 23)	21	1	(Latvia) TFK Beitar	UEFA Futsal Euro 2026
^{INJ} Player withdrew from the squad due to an injury.^{PRE} Preliminary squad.^{RET} Retired from international futsal.

== Coaching staff ==
As of January 20, 2026.

Position	Name
Head coach	(Italy) Massimiliano Bellarte
Assistant coach	(Italy) Francesco Giuliano
Assistant coach	(Latvia) Vadims Atamaņukovs
Goalkeeper coach	(Italy) Luca Chiavaroli
Physiotherapist	(Latvia) Mstislavs Oprisņaks
Physiotherapist	(Latvia) Kristaps Viškers
Doctor	(Latvia) Andris Zujevs
Manager	(Latvia) Roberts Mežeckis
Kitman	(Latvia) Niks Kārlis Jansons
Media officer	(Latvia) Mārtiņš Kovaļovs

=== 2024 results ===
9 February 2024 Friendly	Latvia	4-5	Kosovo	Ogre, Latvia
18:00	Edgars Tarakanovs 8', 14', 38'		Yll Mazreku 18', Drilon Maxharraj 19', ('23), Ramadan Alaj 19', 34')	Stadium: Sport arena Ogre; Attendance: 276; Referee: Mantas Pomeckis (LTU)

10 February 2024 Friendly	Latvia	3-3	Kosovo	Ogre, Latvia
16:00	Miks Babris 28', Andrejs Baklanovs 39', Germans Matjušenko 39'		Mergim Dervishaj 10', Melos Kelmendi 21', Drilon Maxharraj 22'	Stadium: Sport arena Ogre; Attendance: 327; Referee: Mantas Pomeckis (LTU)

23 September 2024 Futsal Week tournament	Turkey	4-5	Latvia	Poreč, Croatia
20:15	Adem Kucukkartal 2', Ramazan Bildirici 5', Gok Deniz Kahveci 10', 37'		Andrejs Baklanovs 2', Artjoms Kozlovskis 5', Artjoms Troickis 25', Andžejs Mickēvičs 26',	Referee: Aleš Perič Močnik (SLO)

24 September 2024 Futsal Week tournament	Slovenia	1-4	Latvia	Poreč, Croatia
18:00	Teo Turk ('32)		Andrejs Baklanovs 9', Artjoms Kozlovskis 25', Daniils Fogels 29', Andžejs Mickēvičs 38',	Referee: Grigori Osomkov (EST)

25 September 2024 Futsal Week tournament	Estonia	1-9	Latvia	Poreč, Croatia
20:15	Mikko-Petteri Matinaro 8'		Andžejs Mickēvičs 1', 29', Artemijs Piļipčuks 13', 38', Artjoms Kozlovskis 21', Artūrs Strazdiņš 25', Renards Ūdris 27', 35', Daniils Fogels 37',

26 September 2024 Futsal Week tournament	Montenegro	1-1	Latvia	Poreč, Croatia
18:00	Nemanja Nikolič 1'		Krists Krūmiņš 9'

6 November 2024 Friendly	Georgia	2-2	Latvia	Tbilisi, Georgia
17:00	Giorgi Chimakadze 38', 39'		Edgars Tarakanovs 16', Andrejs Baklanovs 36'	Stadium: Tbilisi Sports Palace; Attendance: 1000; Referee: Zviad Bliadze (GEO)

7 November 2024 Friendly	Georgia	2-6	Latvia	Tbilisi, Georgia
17:00	Giorgi Ghavtadze 19', Archil Sebiskveradze 27'		Edgars Tarakanovs 14', 18', Artūrs Strazdiņš 19', Andrejs Baklanovs 32', 33', Rainers Mūrnieks 38'	Stadium: Tbilisi Sports Palace; Attendance: 800; Referee: Bakur Ninua (GEO)

13 December 2024 Friendly	Morocco	6-3	Latvia	Salé, Morocco
20:00	Soufiane El Mesrar 14', Driss Raisse El Fenni 16', Anas El Ayyane 19', Ihab Charrady 14', 22', 24'		Miks Babris 8', Edgars Tarakanovs 2', 14'	Stadium: Complexe Mohammed VI de Football; Attendance: 120; Referee: Aymen Kammoun (MOR)

15 December 2024 Friendly	Morocco	2-0	Latvia	Salé, Morocco
18:00	Soufiane El Mesrar 9', Mohmaed Reda Madih 32'			Stadium: Complexe Mohammed VI de Football; Attendance: 80

=== 2025 results ===
3 February 2025 Friendly	Latvia	2-1	Hungary	Salaspils, Latvia
19:00	Miks Babris 30', Edgars Tarakanovs 37'		Patsrik Pál 3'	Stadium: Salaspils Sports Hall; Attendance: 308; Referee: Grigori Osomkov (EST)

5 February 2025 Friendly	Latvia	4-4	Hungary	Salaspils, Latvia
19:00	Artjoms Troickis 0', Andrejs Baklanovs 4', Edgars Tarakanovs 11', 37'		Máté Suscsák 2', Sándor Máté Hadházi 19', Rafael Henrique da Silva 34', Patrik Pál 38'	Stadium: Salaspils Sports Hall; Attendance: 315; Referee: Jagnar Jakobsons (EST)

18 September 2025 International tournament	Netherlands	2-3	Latvia	Jakarta, Indonesia
14:30	Tevfik Ceyar, Ismail Bouhalhoul		Viktors Kuļepovs (2), Andžejs Mickēvičs	Stadium: Gelora Bung Karno Sports Complex; Attendance: 300; Referee: Wahyu Wicaksono (IDN)

20 September 2025 International tournament	Tanzania	0-3	Latvia	Jakarta, Indonesia
11:00	Omari Hasani Yahaya (OG)		Viktors Kuļepovs, Miks Babris	Stadium: Gelora Bung Karno Sports Complex; Attendance: 207; Referee: Tita Rosita (IDN)

21 September 2025 International tournament	Indonesia	2-3	Latvia	Jakarta, Indonesia
14:30	Israr Megantara, Guntur Sulistyo Ariwobowo		Viktors Kuļepovs (2), Edgars Tarakanovs	Stadium: Gelora Bung Karno Sports Complex; Attendance: 1171; Referee: Nattakit Hintua (THA)

19 October 2025 Friendly	Latvia	1-3	Portugal	Riga, Latvia
18:00	Sergejs Motiļs		Afonso, Edmilson Sa, Diogo Santos	Stadium: Latvian Team Sports Hall; Attendance: 515; Referee: Sergejs Šacmans

21 October 2025 Friendly	Latvia	2-5	Portugal	Riga, Latvia
19:00	Miks Babris, Edgars Tarakanovs		Bruno Maior, Bruno Coelho, Afonso Jesus, Edmilson Sa, Diogo Santos	Stadium: Latvian Team Sports Hall; Attendance: 381; Referee: Ingus Puriņš

10 November 2025 Friendly	Malta	3-8	Latvia	Bucharest, Romania
12:00			Edgars Tarakanovs (4), Viktors Kuļepovs, Andžejs Mickēvičs, Sergejs Motiļs, Andrejs Baklanovs	Stadium: Concordia Sports Hall; Attendance: 20

11 November 2025 Friendly	Romania	1-3	Latvia	Bucharest, Romania
19:30			Miks Babris, Edgars Tarakanovs, Viktors Kuļepovs	Stadium: Concordia Sports Hall; Attendance: 100

17 December 2025 Friendly	Kosovo	4-7	Latvia	Czech Republic, Kutná Hora
17:00	Maxharraj (3), Imeri (2), Haxhijaj (2)		Troickis, Mickēvičs, Tarakanovs, Baklanovs	Stadium: Klimeška sport hall Attendance: 100; Referee: Jan Kresta

18 December 2025 Friendly	Czech Republic	1-1	Latvia	Czech Republic, Kutná Hora
20:00	Mikus		Baklanovs	Stadium: Klimeška sport hall Attendance: 237; Referee: Radim Čep

20 December 2025 Friendly	Lithuania	4-1	Latvia	Czech Republic, Kutná Hora
17:00	Osauskas, Voskunovič, Derendiajev, Zagurskas		Matjušenko	Stadium: Klimeška sport hall Attendance: 120

=== 2026 results ===
21 January 2026 UEFA Futsal Euro 2026	Latvia	4-0	Georgia	Riga, Latvia
20:00	Matjušenko, Tarakanovs (2x), Baklanovs			Stadium: Xiaomi Arena; Attendance: 3153; Referee: Cristiano Santos (POR)

25 January 2026 UEFA Futsal Euro 2026	France	5-0	Latvia	Riga, Latvia
17:00				Stadium: Xiaomi Arena; Attendance: 5277; Referee: Daniel Matkovic (SUI)

28 January 2026 UEFA Futsal Euro 2026	Latvia	1-4	Croatia	Riga, Latvia
17:30	Tarakanovs			Stadium: Xiaomi Arena; Attendance: 3235; Referee: Chiara Perona (ITA)

== Player records ==
As of 29 January 2026, after the UEFA Futsal Euro 2026. Players in bold are still active with Latvia.

=== Most appearances ===
Rank	Player	Caps	Goals
1	Aigars Bondars	87	0
2	**Germans Matjušenko**	86	34
3	Maksims Seņs	81	44
4	**Jānis Pastars**	68	11
5	Andrejs Baklanovs	63	36
6	**Miks Babris**	62	16
7	**Matīss Babris**	57	15
8	Artjoms Koļesņikovs	56	11
9	Andrejs Aleksejevs	49	12
10	Konstantīns Zabarovskis	45	4

=== Top goalscorers ===
Rank	Player	Goals	Caps	Average
1.	Maksims Seņs	44	81	0.28
2.	**Andrejs Baklanovs**	36	63	0.38
3.	**Germans Matjušenko**	34	86	0.1
4.	**Edgars Tarakanovs**	26	49	0.13
5.	**Artūrs Jerofejevs**	16	41	0.2
6.	**Miks Babris**	16	62	0.26
7.	Igors Dacko	12	36	0.57
8.	Oskars Ikstens	12	43	0.25
9.	Andrejs Aleksejevs	11	48	0.27
9.	Sergejs Nabigins	11	42	0.18
9.	Artjoms Koļesņikovs	11	55	0.11
9.	**Jānis Pastars**	11	68	0.11
10.	Andrejs Šustrovs	10	33	0.11
10.	Igors Avanesovs	10	32	0.11

== Competition history ==
=== FIFA Futsal World Cup ===
FIFA Futsal World Cup Record
Year	Round	Position	Pld	W	D	L	GS	GA
(Netherlands) 1989	Did not compete							
(Hong Kong) 1992	Did not compete							
(Spain) 1996	Did not compete							
(Guatemala) 2000	Did not qualify							
(Chinese Taipei) 2004	Did not qualify							
(Brazil) 2008	Did not qualify							
(Thailand) 2012	Did not qualify							
(Colombia) 2016	Did not qualify							
(Lithuania) 2021	Did not qualify							
(Uzbekistan) 2024	Did not qualify							
Total	0/10		0	0	0	0	0	00

=== UEFA Futsal Championship ===
UEFA Futsal Championship record
Year	Round	Position	Pld	W	D	L	GS	GA
(Spain) 1996	Did not compete							
(Spain) 1999	Did not qualify							
(Russia) 2001	Did not qualify							
(Italy) 2003	Did not qualify							
(Czech Republic) 2005	Did not qualify							
(Portugal) 2007	Did not qualify							
(Hungary) 2010	Did not qualify							
(Croatia) 2012	Did not qualify							
(Belgium) 2014	Did not qualify							
(Serbia) 2016	Did not qualify							
(Slovenia) 2018	Did not qualify							
(Netherlands) 2022	Did not qualify							
(Latvia) (Lithuania) (Slovenia) 2026	Group stage	11th	3	1	0	2	5	9
Total:1/13	Group stage	11th	3	1	0	2	5	9
