= Estonia national futsal team =

Estonia
- Nickname(s): Sinisärgid (Blueshirts)
- Association: Eesti Jalgpalli Liit
- Confederation: UEFA (Europe)
- Head coach: (Finland) Mikko Kytölä
- Most caps: Sergei Kostin (44)
- Top scorer: Vladislav Tšurilkin (9)
- FIFA code: EST
- FIFA ranking: 113 ▲14 (8 May 2026)

First international
- Finland 9–0 Estonia (Hyvinkää, Finland; 26 January 2007)

Biggest win
- Malta 0–4 Estonia (Pembroke, Malta; 12 March 2022)

Biggest defeat
- Netherlands 13–0 Estonia (Visoko, Bosnia and Herzegovina; 28 February 2008); Latvia 13–0 Estonia (Ogre, Latvia; 26 December 2008)

FIFA World Cup
- Appearances: 0

UEFA Futsal Championship
- Appearances: 0

The Estonia national futsal team represents Estonia during international futsal competitions such as the FIFA Futsal World Cup and the European Championships. It was formed in 2007 and is under the direction of the Estonian Football Association.

== Competitive record ==
=== FIFA Futsal World Cup ===
FIFA Futsal World Cup record								Qualification record						
Year	Round	Pld	W	D	L	GF	GA	Outcome	Pld	W	D	L	GF	GA
(Netherlands) 1989	Part of Soviet Union							Part of Soviet Union						
(Hong Kong) 1992	Did not enter							Did not enter						
(Spain) 1996	Did not enter							Did not enter						
(Guatemala) 2000	Did not enter							Did not enter						
(Taiwan) 2004	Did not enter							Did not enter						
(Brazil) 2008	Did not qualify							Group 2 4th place	3	0	0	3	1	32
(Thailand) 2012	Did not qualify							Group D 4th place	3	0	0	3	6	13
(Colombia) 2016	Did not qualify							Group D 3rd place	3	1	0	2	5	11
(Lithuania) 2021	Did not qualify							Group G 4th place	3	0	0	3	3	11
(Uzbekistan) 2024	Did not qualify							Group F 4th place	3	0	0	3	5	16
Total	0/10	0	0	0	0	0	0	5/10	15	1	0	14	20	83

=== UEFA Futsal Championship ===
UEFA Futsal Euro record								Qualification record						
Year	Round	Pld	W	D	L	GF	GA	Outcome	Pld	W	D	L	GF	GA
(Spain) 1996	Did not enter							Did not enter						
(Spain) 1999	Did not enter							Did not enter						
(Russia) 2001	Did not enter							Did not enter						
(Italy) 2003	Did not enter							Did not enter						
(Czech Republic) 2005	Did not enter							Did not enter						
(Portugal) 2007	Did not enter							Did not enter						
(Hungary) 2010	Did not qualify							Group B 4th place	3	0	0	3	5	17
(Croatia) 2012	Did not qualify							Group C 4th place	3	0	0	3	4	17
(Belgium) 2014	Did not qualify							Group E 4th place	3	0	0	3	5	11
(Serbia) 2016	Did not qualify							Group C 4th place	3	0	0	3	10	18
(Slovenia) 2018	Did not qualify							Group C 4th place	3	0	0	3	7	14
(Netherlands) 2022	Did not qualify							Group G 3rd place	2	0	0	2	3	10
(Latvia) (Lithuania) (Slovenia) 2026	Did not qualify							Group A 3rd place	3	1	0	2	4	5
Total	0/13	0	0	0	0	0	0	7/13	20	1	0	19	38	92

=== Minor tournaments ===
Year	Tournament	City	Pos	GP	W	D	L	GS	GA
2008	Baltic Futsal Cup	Ogre, Latvia	3rd	2	0	0	2	1	19
2010	Baltic Futsal Cup	Ogre, Latvia	3rd	2	0	0	2	2	10
2013	Baltic Futsal Cup	Ogre, Latvia	3rd	2	0	1	1	6	7
2014	Baltic Futsal Cup	Kėdainiai, Lithuania	3rd	2	0	0	2	4	11
2015	Baltic Futsal Cup	Kiili, Estonia	3rd	3	1	0	2	5	11

== Players ==
=== Current squad ===
The following players were called up to the squad for the 2028 FIFA Futsal World Cup qualifying matches against Norway, Israel and Greece on 11, 12 and 14 April 2026 respectively.

No.	Pos.	Player	Date of birth (age)	Caps	Goals	Club
12	GK	Vladislav Tsvetkov	17 October 1997 (age 28)	6	0	(Estonian Football Association) Tallinna FC Bunker Partner
20	GK	Mark Boskin (captain)	10 July 1988 (age 38)	80	3	(Estonian Football Association) Tallinna FC Bunker Partner
2	DF	Raul Rebane	18 August 1994 (age 31)	40	2	(Estonian Football Association) Tartu Ravens Futsal
4	DF	Pavel Rubel	21 January 1991 (age 35)	28	6	(Estonian Football Association) Tallinna FC Bunker Partner
7	DF	Artur Bõstrov	2 September 1991 (age 34)	38	5	(Estonian Football Association) Tallinna FC Bunker Partner
10	DF	Lehar Savikink	5 May 1990 (age 36)	32	3	(Estonian Football Association) Tartu Ravens Futsal
14	DF	Edwin Stüf	30 July 1989 (age 37)	47	5	(Estonian Football Association) Tallinna FC Bunker Partner
18	DF	Raul Männi	16 February 2006 (age 20)	19	1	(Estonian Football Association) Silla Futsal Club
5	FW	Ervin Stüf	3 December 1990 (age 35)	28	7	(Estonian Football Association) Tallinna FC Bunker Partner
6	FW	Roman Bažkov	3 September 2005 (age 20)	23	5	(Estonian Football Association) Silla Futsal Club
8	FW	Märten Männiste	5 August 2001 (age 25)	8	0	(Estonian Football Association) Saku Sporting
9	FW	Mikko Matinaro	5 January 1988 (age 38)	24	4	(Football Association of Finland) Tervakosken Pato Futsal
11	FW	Denis Vnukov	1 November 1991 (age 34)	32	21	(Estonian Football Association) Tallinna FC Bunker Partner
15	FW	Eduard Desjatski	10 June 1999 (age 27)	12	4	(Estonian Football Association) Tartu Ravens Futsal

=== Recent call-ups ===
The following players have also been called up to the squad within the last 12 months.

Pos.	Player	Date of birth (age)	Caps	Goals	Club	Latest call-up
GK	Artjom Tikhonov	16 March 2007 (age 19)	8	0	(Estonia) Tallinna FC Qarabag	v. Norway, 25 January 2026
GK	Mario Kuum	24 October 1998 (age 27)	11	0	(Estonia) Saku Sporting	v. Gibraltar, 21 December 2025
DF	Mark Ivanov	6 February 1994 (age 32)	21	0	(Estonia) Tallinna FC Bunker Partner	v. Norway, 25 January 2026
DF	Martin Valkiainen	29 July 2003 (age 23)	4	0	(Estonia) Saku Sporting	v. Norway, 25 January 2026
DF	Stanislav Gussev	30 March 2005 (age 21)	19	1	(Estonia) Silla Futsal Club	v. Georgia, 10 November 2025
FW	Kristjan Kalamees	3 January 2007 (age 19)	2	0	(Estonia) Narva United FC	v. Norway, 25 January 2026
FW	Matvei Minajev	29 April 2007 (age 19)	2	0	(Estonia) Saku Sporting	v. Gibraltar, 21 December 2025
FW	Daniil Dikopavlenko	30 September 2003 (age 22)	7	0	(Estonia) Narva United FC	v. Georgia, 10 November 2025
^{INJ} Player withdrew from the squad due to an injury.^{PRE} Preliminary squad.^{RET} Retired from international futsal.

== Managers ==
Manager	Years	GP	W	D	L	GS	GA
(Brazil) (Finland) Fredo Getulio	2007–2009	10	0	0	10	8	82
(Estonia) Kert Haavistu	2010–2013	17	0	1	16	27	70
(Russia) Dmitri Skiperski	2014–	19	2	2	15	36	78
