= 2026 Futsal Week January Cup =

Tournament details
- Host country: Croatia
- City: Labin
- Dates: 22–25 January
- Teams: 8
- Venue: Franko Mileta Hall

Final positions
- Champions: Morocco (3rd title)
- Runners-up: Romania
- Third place: San Marino
- Fourth place: Turkey

Tournament statistics
- Top scorer: Idriss Rais El Fenni (Morocco)
- Best player: Soufiane El Mesrar (Morocco)
- Best goalkeeper: Youssef Ben Sellam (Morocco)

The 2026 Futsal Week January Cup was an international men's futsal tournament hosted by Futsal Week, and held in Labin, Croatia from 22 to 25 January 2026. The tournament was won by Morocco.

It was originally scheduled for the fall, but was postponed.

== Teams ==
Team	Appearance	Previous best performance
Greenland	7th	Third place (Autumn 2021, November 2022, February 2024)
Malta	4th	Fourth place (February 2024, September 2025)
Morocco	3rd	Champions (Winter 2020, October 2023)
Romania	5th	Champions (Autumn 2024, November 2024)
San Marino	11th	Runner-up (February 2024, September 2025)
Scotland	1st	Debut
Switzerland	3rd	Third place (Autumn 2017)
Turkey	6th	Runner-up (April 2023, October 2023)

=== Squads ===
Greenland	Malta	Morocco	Romania
	6 Giancarlo Sammut; 7 Aidan Buhagiar; 8 Kaden Baldacchino; 10 Maicon Silva; 11 Luke Gatt; 12 Matthias Borg (GK); 16 Nathan Cope; 17 Karl Schembri; 18 Maksim Radojevic; 19 Andrej Trajkoski (GK); 21 Collin Sammut; 24 Nezar Abuaisha; Clint Mifsud (C; GK); Michael Borg; Daniel Camilleri; Zac Portelli	1 Youssef Ben Sellam (GK); 2 Anas Dahani; 5 Othmane El Idrissi; 6 Soufiane Borite; 8 Soufian Charraoui; 9 Youness Mkarsi; 10 Soufiane El Mesrar (C); 11 Bilal Bakkali; 12 Mohammed Cheridou (GK); 13 Naoufel Aberkan; 14 Idriss Raiss El Fenni; 15 Reda Madih; 16 Saad Allah El Hajibi; 19 Yanis Erraddaf	1 Krisztián Korodi (GK); 2 Szilárd Kanyó; 4 Sergiu Gavrilă; 5 Patrick Cherteș; 6 Norbert Barbocz; 7 István Hadnagy; 8 Darius Nastai; 9 Vlăduț Dudău; 10 Robert Crișan; 11 Miklós Tamás; 12 Petrişor Toniţă (GK); 13 Daniel Dinu; 14 Mátyás Mathis; 20 Andrei Crăciun
San Marino	Scotland	Switzerland	Turkey
Mattia Protti (GK); Daniele Maiani; Paolo Verri; Danilo Busignani; Matteo Moretti; Jacopo Pazzini; Andrea Ceccoli; Lorenzo Cecchini; Jacopo Gamba; Matteo Chezzi; Nicholas Cola; Fabio Belloni; Marco De Angelis	1 Ben O'Hanlon (C; GK); 2 Callum Husband; 3 Chris Angus; 4 James Grant; 5 Jamie Bell; 6 Caleb Holness; 7 Gavin Ritchie; 8 Kai Lawless; 9 Ross Cameron; 10 Ahmed Aloulou; 11 Adam Fairweather; 12 Robert Black (GK); 14 Ellis Stevenson; 15 Noah Lucas	1 Philipp Aranya (GK); 2 Elias Kägi; 7 Luis Matos; 8 Raphael King; 9 Evangelos Marcoyannakis (C); 10 Luca Lanzendorfer; 11 Kevin Jaggi; Stefano Köppel (GK); Agon Xhemajli; 16 Alex Garcia; 17 Gabriel Buckson; 19 Thomas Valentim; 20 Laurin Arpagaus; Ardit Bytyqi; Joshua Gonzalez	Deniz Roofthoofd (GK); Burak Uğurlu; Ali Kaya; Gökdeniz Kahveci; Umur Ağır; Yusuf Sözübek (GK); Hıdır Aslaner; Salih Öndüç; Kamil Akparlak; Mücahit Ceylan; Cemil Avcı; Hasan Ekmen

== Quarter-finals ==
22 January 2026
10:00

Greenland	4–8	Romania
	Report	Szilárd Kanyó 13'20", 37'02", 38'27"; Andrei Crăciun 26'30", 31'38"; Vlăduț Dudău 32'24"; Darius Nastai 32'35"; Patrick Cherteș 38'53"

Franko Mileta Hall, Labin, Croatia
22 January 2026
12:30

Malta	4–4	Turkey
	Report
Penalties
	0–3

Franko Mileta Hall, Labin, Croatia
22 January 2026
16:00

Morocco	12–1	Scotland
Naoufel Aberkan 6'31", 10'59"; Soufiane El Mesrar 7'47"; Reda Madih 8'58"; Idriss Raiss El-Fenni 9'30", 10'24", 25'16", 30'57"; Othmane El Idrissi 11'19", 18'26"; Soufiane Borite 15'43"; Youssef Ben Sellam 17'21"	Report	James Grant 37'39"

Franko Mileta Hall, Labin, Croatia
22 January 2026
18:15

Switzerland	3–5	San Marino
Jaggi 15'38"; Marcoyannakis 33'08"; Lanzendorfer 36'17"	Report	Busignani 1'03"; Maiani 16'20"; Moretti 18'39"; De Angelis 27'17", 35'25"

Franko Mileta Hall, Labin, Croatia
Referee: Semir Keserović (Slovenia), Noa Mečić (Croatia)

== Semi-finals ==
=== 5–8 ===
23 January 2026
10:00

Greenland	6–2	Malta

Franko Mileta Hall, Labin, Croatia
23 January 2026
16:00

Scotland	1–5	Switzerland

Franko Mileta Hall, Labin, Croatia

=== 1–4 ===
23 January 2026
12:30

Romania	5–1	Turkey
Sergiu Gavrilă 8'18"; 24'18" (o.g.); Patrick Cherteș 25'37", 27'40"; Petrișor Toniță 35'10"	Report	Umur Ağır 7'40"

Franko Mileta Hall, Labin, Croatia
23 January 2026
18:15

Morocco	12–2	San Marino
Madih 2'49"; El Mesrar 4'12", 36'30", 39'16", 39'50"; El Idrissi 16'37"; Bakkali 17'52"; Sena 25'28"; El Fenni 31'04", 31'49", 38'22"; Maiani 33'54" (o.g.)	Report	Moretti 24'23"; Busignani 29'49"

Franko Mileta Hall, Labin, Croatia
Referee: Noa Mečić (Croatia), Emilie Aubry (Switzerland)

== Finals ==
=== 7th place match ===
25 January 2026
10:00

Malta	5–2	Scotland
8'36"; 13'35"; 22'20"; 31'36"; 33'36"		1'28"; 39'43"

Franko Mileta Hall, Labin, Croatia

=== 5th place match ===
25 January 2026
12:30

Switzerland	3–0	Greenland
Elias Kägi 14'51", 39'50"; Loureiro Matos 27'19"

Franko Mileta Hall, Labin, Croatia

=== 3rd place match ===
25 January 2026
16:00

Turkey	1–1	San Marino
Gökdeniz Kahveci 37'52"	Report (TFF); Report (FSGC)	Paolo Verri 38'51"
Penalties
Umur Ağır (penalty scored); Gökdeniz Kahveci (penalty missed); Cemil Avcı (penalty scored); Burak Uğurlu (penalty scored); Kamil Akparlak (penalty scored)	4–5	(penalty scored) Danilo Busignani; (penalty scored) Paolo Verri; (penalty scored) Matteo Moretti; (penalty scored) Marco De Angelis; (penalty scored) Fabio Belloni

Franko Mileta Hall, Labin, Croatia
Referee: Andrea Naudi (Malta), Emilie Aubry (Switzerland)

=== 1st place match ===
25 January 2026
18:15

Romania	2–8	Morocco
Vlăduț Dudău 17'; Szilárd Kanyó 26'	Report (FRF)	Soufiane Borite; Soufiane El Mesrar; Idriss Raiss El Fenni; Othmane El Idrissi; Soufian Charraoui; Bilal Bakkali

Franko Mileta Hall, Labin, Croatia
