= 2025 Futsal Week December Cup =

Tournament details
- Host country: Croatia
- City: Poreč
- Dates: 17–21 December
- Teams: 4
- Venue: Intersport Hall

Final positions
- Champions: Poland (4th title)
- Runners-up: Japan
- Third place: Saudi Arabia
- Fourth place: Slovenia

Tournament statistics
- Top scorer: (Saudi Arabia) Fahad Awadh J. AlJohani
- Best player: (Poland) Tomasz Kreizel
- Best goalkeeper: (Poland) Michal Widuch
- Fair play award: Japan

The 2025 Futsal Week September Cup was an international men's futsal tournament hosted by Futsal Week, and held in Poreč, Croatia from 17 to 21 December 2025. Poland won the tournament.

== Teams ==
Team	Appearance	Previous best performance
Hungary	9th	Champions (Autumn 2018, March 2022, November 2022, January 2023)
Japan	1st	Debut
Poland	5th	Champions (June 2022, June 2023, June 2024)
Romania	4th	Champions (Autumn 2024, November 2024)
Saudi Arabia	4th	Runner-up (Summer 2021, September 2022)
Slovenia	5th	Champions (Winter 2 2017, April 2023)

== Group stage ==
=== Group A ===
Pos	Team	Pld	W	D	L	GF	GA	GD	Pts	Qualification
1	Japan	2	1	0	1	6	4	+2	3	Final
2	Slovenia	2	1	0	1	4	4	0	3	3rd place match
3	Hungary	2	1	0	1	5	7	−2	3	5th place match

Source: Futsal Planet

=== Group B ===
Pos	Team	Pld	W	D	L	GF	GA	GD	Pts	Qualification
1	Poland	2	2	0	0	7	3	+4	6	Final
2	Saudi Arabia	2	1	0	1	7	5	+2	3	3rd place match
3	Romania	2	0	0	2	3	9	−6	0	5th place match

Source: Futsal Planet

== Placement matches ==
=== 5th place match ===
21 December 2025
12:30

Hungary	8–5	Romania
Pál Patrik Krisztián 5'; Rábl János 13'; Rutai Balázs 21'; Suscsák Máté János 24', 31'; Vatamaniuc-Bartha Dávid 26'; Rafinha 27', 32'	Report	Mátyás Mathis 16'; Miklós Tamás 20'; Szilárd Kanyó 23', 30'; Patrick Cherteș 32'

Intersport, Poreč, Croatia

=== 3rd place match ===
21 December 2025
16:00

Slovenia	3–3	Saudi Arabia
Matej Fideršek 18', 37'; Nawaf Mubarak A Aroan 36' (o.g.)	Report	Fahad Awadah J Aljohani 15'; Eihab Saiedahmed Mohamed Ahmed 26'; Saleh Mari S Alqarni 29'
Penalties
	3–4

Intersport, Poreč, Croatia
Referee: Videc Mateo

=== Final ===
21 December 2025
18:15

Japan	1–3	Poland
Kokoro Harada 23'	Report	Paweł Kaniewski 12'; Sebastian Leszczak 23' (pen.); Tomasz Kriezel 32'

Intersport, Poreč, Croatia
Referee: Simon Podgoršek (Slovenia)
