= UEFA Futsal Euro 2026 qualifying =

Tournament details
- Dates: 9 April 2024 – 24 September 2025
- Teams: 48 (from 1 confederation)

Tournament statistics
- Matches played: 146
- Goals scored: 842 (5.77 per match)
- Top scorer: (Slovakia) Tomáš Drahovský (10 goals)

The UEFA Futsal Euro 2026 qualifying competition was a men's futsal competition that determined the 14 teams joining the automatically qualified co-hosts Latvia and Lithuania in the UEFA Futsal Euro 2026 final tournament.

A total of 48 UEFA member national teams entered the competition. Apart from co-hosts Latvia and Lithuania, the remaining 46 teams entered the qualifying competition. The 34 teams with the highest futsal men's national-team coefficient ranking taken in December 2023 were given byes to the main round, while the remaining 12 teams entered in the preliminary round.

Russia was banned from qualifying following the country's invasion of Ukraine.

== Format ==
The qualifying competition consisted of three rounds:

- Preliminary round: The 12 teams that entered this round were drawn into three groups. Each group played a single round-robin, with one of the teams selected as hosts before the draw. For each group, the winners and runners-up advance to the main round.
- Main round: The 40 teams (34 teams with the highest coefficient ranking, and six teams from the preliminary round) were drawn into ten groups. Each group played a home-and-away round-robin. The ten group winners qualified for the final tournament, while the eight best runners-up advanced to the play-offs.
- Play-offs: The eight teams were drawn into four two-legged home-and-away ties to determine the last four qualifiers.

=== Tiebreakers ===
In the preliminary round and main round, teams were ranked according to points (3 points for a win, 1 point for a draw, 0 points for a loss), and if tied on points, the following tiebreaking criteria were applied, in the order given, to determine the rankings (Regulations Articles 14.01, 14.02 and 17.01):

1. Points in head-to-head matches among tied teams;
2. Goal difference in head-to-head matches among tied teams;
3. Goals scored in head-to-head matches among tied teams;
4. If more than two teams are tied, and after applying all head-to-head criteria above, a subset of teams are still tied, all head-to-head criteria above are reapplied exclusively to this subset of teams;
5. Goal difference in all group matches;
6. Goals scored in all group matches;
7. (Preliminary round only) Penalty shoot-out if only two teams have the same number of points, and they met in the last round of the group and are tied after applying all criteria above (not used if more than two teams have the same number of points, or if their rankings are not relevant for qualification for the next stage);
8. (Main round only) Away goals scored in all group matches;
9. (Main round only) Wins in all group matches;
10. (Main round only) Away wins in all group matches;
11. Disciplinary points (red card = 3 points, yellow card = 1 point, expulsion for two yellow cards in one match = 3 points);
12. UEFA coefficient ranking for the qualifying round or qualifying group stage draw;

To determine the eight best runners-up from the main round. The following criteria were applied (Regulations Article 16.01):

1. Points;
2. Goal difference;
3. Goals scored;
4. Disciplinary points;
5. UEFA coefficient ranking for the qualifying round or qualifying group stage draw;

In the play-offs, the team that scored more goals on aggregate over the two legs qualified for the final tournament. If the aggregate score was level, two 5-minute periods of extra time were played at the end of the second leg. The team which scored more goals during extra time qualifies for the next stage. If both teams scored the same number of goals during extra time, a penalty shoot-out determined which team qualified for the next stage (Regulations Article 22.03).

== Schedule ==
The qualifying matches were played on dates that fell within the FIFA Futsal International Match Calendar.

Schedule for UEFA Futsal Euro 2026 qualifying
| Round | Draw | Dates |
|---|---|---|
| Preliminary round | 25 January 2024 | 9–14 April 2024 |
| Main round | 30 May 2024 | 11–18 December 2024, 30 January – 5 February 2025, 6–12 March 2025, 10–16 April 2025 |
| Play-offs | 3 July 2025 | 18–19 & 23–24 September 2025 |

== Entrants ==
The teams were ranked according to their coefficient ranking, calculated based on all FIFA and UEFA national senior men's futsal team matches played since the UEFA European qualifying competition for the 2021 FIFA Futsal World Cup.

The 34 highest-ranked teams entered the main round, while the 12 lowest-ranked teams entered the preliminary round. The coefficient ranking was also used for seeding in the main round draw, where each team was assigned a seeding position according to their ranking.

Final tournament hosts
| Team | Coeff. | Rank |
|---|---|---|
| **Latvia** | 1387.402 | 27 |
| **Lithuania** | 1195.790 | 33 |

Participating teams for UEFA Futsal Euro 2026 qualifying

Teams entering main round
| Team | Coeff. | Rank |
|---|---|---|
| **Portugal** | 2715.953 | 1 |
| **Spain** | 2495.409 | 3 |
| Kazakhstan | 2418.002 | 4 |
| **Ukraine** | 2056.591 | 5 |
| **Croatia** | 1976.252 | 6 |
| Finland | 1970.212 | 7 |
| **France** | 1967.701 | 8 |
| **Poland** | 1924.072 | 9 |
| **Slovenia** | 1898.780 | 10 |
| Serbia | 1884.558 | 11 |
| **Italy** | 1873.140 | 12 |
| Netherlands | 1862.329 | 13 |
| **Czechia** | 1811.644 | 14 |
| Romania | 1806.321 | 15 |
| Azerbaijan | 1795.390 | 16 |
| Georgia | 1761.015 | 17 |
| Slovakia | 1664.887 | 18 |
| Hungary | 1635.528 | 19 |
| **Armenia** | 1626.853 | 20 |
| Bosnia and Herzegovina | 1609.649 | 21 |
| **Belarus** | 1521.865 | 22 |
| Moldova | 1514.719 | 23 |
| Belgium | 1504.554 | 24 |
| North Macedonia | 1451.512 | 25 |
| Germany | 1433.349 | 26 |
| Sweden | 1327.701 | 28 |
| Montenegro | 1306.735 | 29 |
| Kosovo | 1264.444 | 30 |
| England | 1204.183 | 31 |
| Denmark | 1199.225 | 32 |
| Albania | 1177.965 | 34 |
| Norway | 1173.463 | 35 |
| Greece | 1164.389 | 36 |
| Turkey | 1131.406 | 37 |

Teams entering preliminary round
| Team | Coeff. | Rank |
|---|---|---|
| Israel | 1128.385 | 38 |
| Cyprus | 1090.591 | 39 |
| Switzerland | 1066.246 | 40 |
| Bulgaria | 1031.006 | 41 |
| Andorra | 916.855 | 43 |
| Malta | 830.007 | 44 |
| Gibraltar | 809.650 | 45 |
| Austria | 794.108 | 46 |
| Estonia | 787.508 | 47 |
| San Marino | 762.906 | 48 |
| Scotland | 755.050 | 49 |
| Northern Ireland | 717.420 | 50 |

Did not enter
| Team | Coeff. | Rank |
|---|---|---|
| Russia | 2547.159 | 2 |
| Wales | 1011.432 | 42 |
| Iceland | - | **NR** |
| Faroe Islands | - | **NR** |
| Liechtenstein | - | **NR** |
| Luxembourg | - | **NR** |
| Republic of Ireland | - | **NR** |

Notes

- Teams marked in **bold** have qualified for the final tournament.
- NR: No rank.

== Preliminary round ==
=== Draw ===
The draw for the preliminary round took place at 14:00 CET, 25 January 2024. The seeding was based on the Elo-based futsal men's national-team coefficient ranking taken in December 2023. The 12 teams were drawn into 3 groups of four.

The draw started with pot 1 and ended with pot 4, with each team selected then allocated into groups alphabetically. The pots for the draw are shown below.

Draw
| Pot 1 | Pot 2 | Pot 3 | Pot 4 |
|---|---|---|---|
| San Marino; Scotland; Northern Ireland | Gibraltar; Austria; Estonia | Bulgaria; Andorra; Malta | Israel; Cyprus; Switzerland |

=== Groups ===
The winners and runners-up of each group advanced to the main round. The preliminary round was played 9 – 14 April 2024.

All matches within each group were hosted by one of the participating associations. The hosts were Cyprus, Austria, and Switzerland. When establishing the match schedule, the host association is placed in position 1, and the visiting teams in positions 2, 3 and 4, according to their coefficient rankings.

==== Group A ====
| Pos | Team | Pld | W | D | L | GF | GA | GD | Pts | Qualification |
|---|---|---|---|---|---|---|---|---|---|---|
| 1 | Cyprus (H) | 3 | 2 | 1 | 0 | 7 | 5 | +2 | 7 (Note: Tied on head-to-head, total goal difference, and total goals scored. Disciplinary points: Cyprus –4, Andorra –6.) | Main round |
| 2 | Andorra | 3 | 2 | 1 | 0 | 7 | 5 | +2 | 7 | Main round |
| 3 | Estonia | 3 | 1 | 0 | 2 | 4 | 5 | −1 | 3 | |
| 4 | Northern Ireland | 3 | 0 | 0 | 3 | 5 | 8 | −3 | 0 | |

Source: UEFA
Rules for classification: Tiebreakers
(H) Hosts
Notes:
9 April 2024
11:00 EEST

| Cyprus | 2–1 | Estonia |
|---|---|---|
| Savva 34:00; El Kebbe 39:30 | Report | Vnukov 18:02 |

Eleftheria Indoor Hall, Nicosia
Referee: Chiara Perona (Italy), Rastislav Behancin (Slovakia)
9 April 2024
15:30 EEST

| Andorra | 3–2 | Northern Ireland |
|---|---|---|
| Adrià Blat 11:35; Torres Domenjo 29:52; Rodríguez 39:25 | Report | Millar 0:20; Dobney 37:46 |

Eleftheria Indoor Hall, Nicosia
Referee: Viktor Bugenko (Moldova), Done Ristovski (North Macedonia)

10 April 2024
11:00 EEST

| Cyprus | 3–2 | Northern Ireland |
|---|---|---|
| Lakoufis 4:16; El Kebbe 16:14; Constantinides 17:49 | Report | Millar 17:12; Gunn 29:53 |

Eleftheria Indoor Hall, Nicosia
Referee: Done Ristovski (North Macedonia), Chiara Perona (Italy)
10 April 2024
15:30 EEST

| Estonia | 1–2 | Andorra |
|---|---|---|
| Vnukov 27:51 (pen.) | Report | Adrià Blat 17:07; Dos Santos 39:40 |

Eleftheria Indoor Hall, Nicosia
Referee: Rastislav Behancin (Slovakia), Viktor Bugenko (Moldova)

12 April 2024
11:00 EEST

| Andorra | 2–2 | Cyprus |
|---|---|---|
| Regalo Figueiredo 33:55; Debboun 39:24 | Report | Kouloumbris 11:42; Tsitsos 24:46 |

Eleftheria Indoor Hall, Nicosia
Referee: Chiara Perona (Italy), Done Ristovski (North Macedonia)
12 April 2024
15:30 EEST

| Northern Ireland | 1–2 | Estonia |
|---|---|---|
| Millar 32:11 | Report | Vnukov 0:14, 7:20 |

Eleftheria Indoor Hall, Nicosia
Referee: Rastislav Behancin (Slovakia), Viktor Bugenko (Moldova)

==== Group B ====
| Pos | Team | Pld | W | D | L | GF | GA | GD | Pts | Qualification |
|---|---|---|---|---|---|---|---|---|---|---|
| 1 | Austria (H) | 3 | 3 | 0 | 0 | 7 | 3 | +4 | 9 | Main round |
| 2 | Bulgaria | 3 | 1 | 1 | 1 | 4 | 2 | +2 | 4 | Main round |
| 3 | Israel | 3 | 0 | 2 | 1 | 3 | 4 | −1 | 2 | |
| 4 | San Marino | 3 | 0 | 1 | 2 | 3 | 8 | −5 | 1 | |

Source: UEFA
Rules for classification: Tiebreakers
(H) Hosts
11 April 2024
14:00 CEST

| Israel | 1–1 | San Marino |
|---|---|---|
| Adani 29:02 | Report | Busignani 22:07 |

Sportzentrum, Eisenstadt
Referee: Admir Zahovič (Slovenia), Darko Boskovic (Switzerland)
11 April 2024
17:00 CEST

| Austria | 1–0 | Bulgaria |
|---|---|---|
| Jatic 26:48 | Report |

Sportzentrum, Eisenstadt
Referee: Miguel Castilho (Portugal), Mislav Džeko (Croatia)

12 April 2024
15:00 CEST

| Bulgaria | 0–0 | Israel |
|---|---|---|
| | Report |

Sportzentrum, Eisenstadt
Referee: Mislav Džeko (Croatia), Admir Zahovič (Slovenia)
12 April 2024
18:00 CEST

| Austria | 3–1 | San Marino |
|---|---|---|
| Jatic 1:54; Steinwandter 15:32, 37:39 | Report | Moretti 31:40 |

Sportzentrum, Eisenstadt
Referee: Darko Boskovic (Switzerland), Miguel Castilho (Portugal)

14 April 2024
11:00 CEST

| San Marino | 1–4 | Bulgaria |
|---|---|---|
| Mattioli 28:09 | Report | Dimov 5:26; Asenov 13:56; Dobrichov 18:51, 36:40 |

Sportzentrum, Eisenstadt
Referee: Darko Boskovic (Switzerland), Mislav Džeko (Croatia)
14 April 2024
14:00 CEST

| Israel | 2–3 | Austria |
|---|---|---|
| Piven 25:51; T. Shkolnik 39:25 | Report | Skrgić 1:42; Meitz 13:34; Kreka 38:22 |

Sportzentrum, Eisenstadt
Referee: Miguel Castilho (Portugal), Admir Zahovič (Slovenia)

==== Group C ====
| Pos | Team | Pld | W | D | L | GF | GA | GD | Pts | Qualification |
|---|---|---|---|---|---|---|---|---|---|---|
| 1 | Malta | 3 | 3 | 0 | 0 | 14 | 2 | +12 | 9 | Main round |
| 2 | Switzerland (H) | 3 | 2 | 0 | 1 | 11 | 3 | +8 | 6 | Main round |
| 3 | Gibraltar | 3 | 1 | 0 | 2 | 4 | 16 | −12 | 3 | |
| 4 | Scotland | 3 | 0 | 0 | 3 | 3 | 11 | −8 | 0 | |

Source: UEFA
Rules for classification: Tiebreakers
(H) Hosts
10 April 2024
17:00 CEST

| Malta | 4–1 | Scotland |
|---|---|---|
| Telisi 2:28; Sammut 5:32; C. Alves 25:16; Borg 25:41 (pen.) | Report | Lawless 38:45 |

Mobiliar Arena, Bern
Referee: Gábor Kovács (Hungary), Mariia Myslovska (Ukraine)
10 April 2024
20:00 CEST

| Switzerland | 7–0 | Gibraltar |
|---|---|---|
| Silverio 6:47, 8:43; Sammut 5:32; Marcoyannakis 9:32, 15:05; Gössi 26:41; Uebelhart 37:47; Barreira 38:24 | Report |

Mobiliar Arena, Bern
Referee: Telmen Undrakh (Norway), Kamil Çetin (Turkey)

11 April 2024
17:00 CEST

| Gibraltar | 0–8 | Malta |
|---|---|---|
| | Report | Zammit 1:13, 22:30, 33:14; Maikinho 5:01, 33:55, 34:57; C. Alves 12:23; Telisi 20:26 |

Mobiliar Arena, Bern
Referee: Kamil Çetin (Turkey), Gábor Kovács (Hungary)
11 April 2024
20:00 CEST

| Switzerland | 3–1 | Scotland |
|---|---|---|
| Lanzendorfer 19:41; Kägi 20:16, 26:32 | Report | Holness 34:05 |

Mobiliar Arena, Bern
Referee: Mariia Myslovska (Ukraine), Telmen Undrakh (Norway)

13 April 2024
15:00 CEST

| Scotland | 1–4 | Gibraltar |
|---|---|---|
| McLaren 31:36 | Report | Parker 4:28; Ruiz 15:08, 22:40, 37:13 |

Mobiliar Arena, Bern
Referee: Kamil Çetin (Turkey), Mariia Myslovska (Ukraine)
13 April 2024
18:00 CEST

| Malta | 2–1 | Switzerland |
|---|---|---|
| Telisi 3:13; Borg 25:58 | Report | Qerfoz 31:21 |

Mobiliar Arena, Bern
Referee: Gábor Kovács (Hungary), Telmen Undrakh (Norway)

== Main round ==
=== Draw ===
The draw for the main round took place on 30 May 2024. The seeding were based on the new Elo-based futsal men's national-team coefficient ranking. The 40 teams were drawn into 10 groups of four. Based on the decisions taken by the UEFA Emergency Panel, Serbia and Bosnia and Herzegovina were not to be drawn in the same group as Kosovo. Each team played one home and one away match against each other team in its group.

The ten group winners qualified for the UEFA Futsal EURO 2026, while the eight best runners-up qualified for the play-offs.

Draw
| Pot 1 (Position 4) | Pot 2 (Position 3) | Pot 3 (Position 2) | Pot 4 (Position 1) |
|---|---|---|---|
| Albania; Norway; Greece; Turkey; Cyprus; Switzerland; Bulgaria; Andorra; Malta; Austria | Belarus; Moldova; Belgium; North Macedonia; Germany; Sweden; Montenegro; Kosovo; England; Denmark | Netherlands; Italy; Czechia; Romania; Azerbaijan; Georgia; Slovakia; Hungary; Armenia; Bosnia and Herzegovina | Portugal (holders); Spain; Kazakhstan; Ukraine; Croatia; Finland; France; Poland; Slovenia; Serbia |

=== Group 1 ===
| Pos | Team | Pld | W | D | L | GF | GA | GD | Pts | Qualification |
|---|---|---|---|---|---|---|---|---|---|---|
| 1 | Ukraine | 6 | 6 | 0 | 0 | 37 | 5 | +32 | 18 | Final tournament |
| 2 | Romania | 6 | 3 | 0 | 3 | 18 | 11 | +7 | 9 (Note: Tied on head-to-head points. Head-to-head goal difference: Romania +5, Germany –5.) | Play-offs |
| 3 | Germany | 6 | 3 | 0 | 3 | 11 | 23 | −12 | 9 | |
| 4 | Cyprus | 6 | 0 | 0 | 6 | 7 | 34 | −27 | 0 | |

Source: UEFA
Rules for classification: Tiebreakers
Notes:
12 December 2024
19:00

| Romania | 6–0 | Germany |
|---|---|---|
| Hadnagy 0:13, 19:02; Balint 4:44, 24:27; Nastai 36:33; Toader 39:39 | Report |

City Hall Arena, Târgu Mureș
Attendance: 1,686
Referee: Mislav Džeko (Croatia), Dino Kramar (Croatia)
13 December 2024
11:00

| Cyprus | 0–7 | Ukraine |
|---|---|---|
| | Report | Korsun 6:29, 26:50; Mykytiuk 7:59, 33:28; Fareniuk 10:20, 24:43; Abakshyn 11:54 |

Eleftheria Indoor Hall, Nicosia
Referee: Lukáš Peško (Slovakia), Rastislav Behancin (Slovakia)

17 December 2024
19:00

| Romania | 0–2 | Ukraine |
|---|---|---|
| | Report | Zvarych 10:07; Shved 12:24 |

City Hall Arena, Târgu Mureș
Referee: Ugur Cakmak (Turkey), Fatma Özlem Tursun (Turkey)
18 December 2024
18:30

| Germany | 2–1 | Cyprus |
|---|---|---|
| Block 13:51; Saglam 25:02 | Report | Savva 20:36 |

Trier Arena, Trier
Referee: Ingus Puriņš (Latvia), Stephen Vella (Malta)

31 January 2025
18:00

| Romania | 6–1 | Cyprus |
|---|---|---|
| Hadnagy 1:31, 38:09; Crăciun 10:03; Balint 18:36, 32:46; Iszlai 28:11 | Report | Tsitsos 27:41 |

City Hall Arena, Târgu Mureș
Referee: Petar Radojcic (Serbia), Srdjan Mihajlovic (Serbia)
31 January 2025
18:30

| Germany | 3–5 | Ukraine |
|---|---|---|
| Ak 2:57, 21:23; Oliveira 17:54 (pen.) | Report | Mykytiuk 8:13, 17:15; Zhuk 13:21; Semenchenko 14:22; Korsun 17:39 |

EWS Arena, Göppingen
Referee: Alejandro Martinez Flores (Spain), Juan José Cordero Gallardo (Spain)

4 February 2025
18:00

| Ukraine | 9–0 | Germany |
|---|---|---|
| Zhuk 3:49, 6:38, 31:30, 37:24; Melnyk 16:17; Abakshyn 20:08, 27:55; Mykytiuk 26:30; Fareniuk 30:57 | Report |

Chișinău Arena, Chișinău
Referee: Norbert Szilágyi (Hungary), Péter Zimonyi (Hungary)
5 February 2025
10:00

| Cyprus | 3–4 | Romania |
|---|---|---|
| Koulloupas 31:24, 32:26, 32:51 | Report | Crăciun 15:50; Daniel Araujo 23:06, 26:53; Hadnagy 38:30 |

Eleftheria Indoor Hall, Nicosia
Referee: Julien Lang (France), Jordan Feltesse (France)

11 April 2025
17:00

| Ukraine | 11–1 | Cyprus |
|---|---|---|
| Zhuk 3:41, 13:30, 17:14, 29:04; Melnyk 8:37, 22:10, 32:06; Semenchenko 8:55; Abakshyn 14:54; Zvarych 19:29; Pervieiev 23:25 | Report | Chadjigeorgiou 18:28 |

Sports Hall Koszalin, Koszalin
Referee: Pawel Tokarewicz (Poland), Monika Czudzinowicz (Poland)
11 April 2025
17:30

| Germany | 2–1 | Romania |
|---|---|---|
| Herterich 15:38; Block 24:14 | Report | Daniel Araujo 36:32 |

BallsportArena, Dresden
Referee: Lukáš Peško (Slovakia), Rastislav Behancin (Slovakia)

15 April 2025
10:00

| Cyprus | 1–4 | Germany |
|---|---|---|
| Michael 9:52 | Report | Block 1:07, 39:45; Lakoufis 21:24 (o.g.); Grünberg 22:37 |

Eleftheria Indoor Hall, Nicosia
Referee: Hikmat Qafarli (Azerbaijan), Ali Jabrayilov (Azerbaijan)
15 April 2025
17:00

| Ukraine | 3–1 | Romania |
|---|---|---|
| Fareniuk 15:48; Shved 24:01; Semenchenko 30:07 | Report | Manya 14:04 |

Sports Hall Koszalin, Koszalin
Referee: Damian Grabowski (Poland), Slawomir Steczko (Poland)

=== Group 2 ===
| Pos | Team | Pld | W | D | L | GF | GA | GD | Pts | Qualification |
|---|---|---|---|---|---|---|---|---|---|---|
| 1 | Belarus | 6 | 5 | 1 | 0 | 19 | 4 | +15 | 16 | Final tournament |
| 2 | Italy | 6 | 4 | 1 | 1 | 25 | 9 | +16 | 13 | Play-offs |
| 3 | Finland | 6 | 2 | 0 | 4 | 16 | 12 | +4 | 6 | |
| 4 | Malta | 6 | 0 | 0 | 6 | 2 | 37 | −35 | 0 | |

Source: UEFA
Rules for classification: Tiebreakers
17 December 2024
19:00

| Malta | 0–5 | Finland |
|---|---|---|
| | Report | Korpela 9:12; J. Kytölä 25:38; Lilja 31:02; Alamikkotervo 34:59; Lintula 38:09 |

Tal-Qroqq University Sports Hall, Gżira
Referee: Besar Beqiri (Kosovo), Besart Ismajli (Kosovo)
30 January 2025
20:00

| Italy | 2–2 | Belarus |
|---|---|---|
| Motta 0:30 (pen.); Schiochet 38:43 | Report | Shimanovski 9:44; Krikun 30:27 |

PalaCatania, Catania
Referee: Ondřej Černý (Czechia), Jan Kresta (Czechia)

4 February 2025
15:00

| Belarus | 5–0 | Malta |
|---|---|---|
| Selyuk 0:53; Shimanovski 1:13; Yakubov 2:04; Krikun 4:23, 8:21 | Report |

PalaVolcan, Acireale
Referee: Antonios Adamopoulos (Greece), Panagiotis Ntalas (Greece)
4 February 2025
18:00

| Finland | 0–2 | Italy |
|---|---|---|
| | Report | Motta 20:58; Pulvirenti 34:55 |

Energia Areena, Vantaa
Referee: Nikola Jelić (Croatia), Mislav Džeko (Croatia)

6 March 2025
17:00

| Belarus | 3–0 | Finland |
|---|---|---|
| Shimanovski 25:46; Krikun 39:42; Rogovik 39:51 | Report |

Amália Sterbinszky Sports Hall, Budapest
Referee: Cristiano Santos (Portugal), Ruben António Cardoso Santos (Portugal)
6 March 2025
19:00

| Italy | 11–1 | Malta |
|---|---|---|
| Motta 11:20; De Oliveira 13:11, 17:59, 23:52; Molaro 13:52, 14:26; Venâncio 14:40, 19:16; Merlim 24:25; Maikinho 31:58 (o.g.); Donin 37:32 | Report | Zammit 39:35 |

Palahockey Fanticini, Reggio Emilia
Referee: Daniel Stauber (Austria), Manuel Wolf (Austria)

9 March 2025
18:00

| Finland | 1–3 | Belarus |
|---|---|---|
| Jaakko Alasuutari 3:09 | Report | Umpirovich 22:47 (pen.); Pinchuk 24:05; Selyuk 39:29 |

Amália Sterbinszky Sports Hall, Budapest
Referee: Dejan Veselič (Slovenia), Aleš Mocnik Peric (Slovenia)
11 March 2025
19:00

| Malta | 1–5 | Italy |
|---|---|---|
| C. Sammut 8:22 | Report | De Oliveira 6:47; Motta 18:51, 21:22; Schiochet 19:56, 35:54 |

Tal-Qroqq University Sports Hall, Gżira
Referee: Zyl Robert Fred Sheriff (Gibraltar), Valentin Ciuplea (Wales)

10 April 2025
18:00

| Finland | 7–0 | Malta |
|---|---|---|
| Lilja 8:59; Vanha 20:30; Alamikkotervo 28:54; Lintula 31:17; Pirttijoki 32:14; Savolainen 37:07; Sylla 38:33 | Report |

Energia Areena, Vantaa
Referee: Besar Beqiri (Kosovo), Besart Ismajli (Kosovo)
11 April 2025
19:00

| Belarus | 2–1 | Italy |
|---|---|---|
| Dubkov 4:34; Yakubov 28:45 | Report | Motta 17:14 |

Tal-Qroqq University Sports Hall, Gżira
Referee: Juan José Cordero Gallardo (Spain), Alejandro Martinez Flores (Spain)

16 April 2025
18:00

| Malta | 0–4 | Belarus |
|---|---|---|
| | Report | Umpirovich 11:41; Krikun 22:29; Selyuk 24:15; Shimanovski 24:38 |

Tal-Qroqq University Sports Hall, Gżira
Referee: Norbert Szilágyi (Hungary), Ádám Czene-Joó (Hungary)
16 April 2025
19:00

| Italy | 4–3 | Finland |
|---|---|---|
| Italo Rosseti 12:57, 35:40, 35:58; Motta 33:23 | Report | Pirttijoki 10:28, 31:20; Pikkarainen 34:05 |

Palasport Fasano, Fasano
Referee: Marjan Mladenovski (North Macedonia), Done Ristovski (North Macedonia)

=== Group 3 ===
| Pos | Team | Pld | W | D | L | GF | GA | GD | Pts | Qualification |
|---|---|---|---|---|---|---|---|---|---|---|
| 1 | Poland | 6 | 5 | 0 | 1 | 22 | 4 | +18 | 15 | Final tournament |
| 2 | Slovakia | 6 | 4 | 0 | 2 | 23 | 19 | +4 | 12 | Play-offs |
| 3 | Moldova | 6 | 3 | 0 | 3 | 17 | 16 | +1 | 9 | |
| 4 | Turkey | 6 | 0 | 0 | 6 | 11 | 34 | −23 | 0 | |

Source: UEFA
Rules for classification: Tiebreakers
17 December 2024
14:00

| Turkey | 1–4 | Poland |
|---|---|---|
| Bildirici 10:22 | Report | Skiepko 4:19; Zastawnik 17:08 (pen.), 35:22 (pen.); Betowski 31:34 |

Erzurum Teknik Üniversitesi Spor Salonu, Erzurum
Referee: Pablo Delgado Sastre (Spain), David Urdánoz Apezteguía (Spain)
18 December 2024
19:00

| Slovakia | 3–2 | Moldova |
|---|---|---|
| Drahovský 15:09, 30:41; Bačo 31:02 | Report | Obadǎ 19:44 (pen.); Gurgurov 23:27 |

Športová hala Arena, Lučenec
Referee: Grigori Ošomkov (Estonia), Martin Køster (Denmark)

4 February 2025
17:00

| Poland | 6–1 | Slovakia |
|---|---|---|
| Bačo 8:42 (o.g.); Madziąg 12:07, 38:03; Kriezel 16:45; Zastawnik 26:43; Szadurski 31:21 | Report | Zaťovič 33:14 |

Arena Gorzów, Gorzów
Referee: Chiara Perona (Italy), Dario Pezzuto (Italy)
5 February 2025
17:30

| Moldova | 4–3 | Turkey |
|---|---|---|
| Tacot 1:39; Obadă 21:26; Mücahid Ceylan 33:01 (o.g.); Laşcu 34:54 | Report | Mücahid Ceylan 7:07; Kamil Can Akparlak 8:29; Melih Özkul 32:42 |

FMF Futsal Arena, Ciorescu
Referee: Kaloyan Kirilov (Bulgaria), Trayan Enchev (Bulgaria)

7 March 2025
14:00

| Moldova | 1–3 | Poland |
|---|---|---|
| Laşcu 30:34 | Report | Zastawnik 20:30; Leszczak 27:25, 31:38 |

FMF Futsal Arena, Ciorescu
Referee: Victor Chaix (France), Julien Lang (France)
7 March 2025

| Slovakia | 7–2 | Turkey |
|---|---|---|
| Drahovský 22:39, 29:25, 37:17, 38:51; Kahan Özcan 24:37 (o.g.); Ševčík 27:07; Ostrák 34:38 | Report | Melih Özkul 13:22; Gökdeniz Kahveci 21:23 |

Športová hala Levice, Levice
Referee: Lars van Leeuwen (Netherlands), Joern Te Kloeze (Netherlands)

12 March 2025
16:00

| Turkey | 4–8 | Slovakia |
|---|---|---|
| Zaťović 4:10 (o.g.), 15:29 (o.g.); Ege Bilim 12:33; Melih Özkul 14:29 | Report | Belaník 7:03, 17:58; Drahovský 10:51, 25:00; Bačo 18:55, 27:09, 27:35; Marton 39:59 |

Erzi̇ncan Yaşar Erkan Sports Hall, Erzincan
Referee: Hikmat Qafarli (Azerbaijan), Knyaz Amiraslanov (Azerbaijan)
12 March 2025
18:00

| Poland | 3–0 | Moldova |
|---|---|---|
| Leszczak 28:13, 32:43; Zastawnik 35:05 | Report |

Hala Widowisko-Sportowa RCS, Lubin
Referee: Arttu Kyynaeraeinen (Finland), Kirill Naishouler (Finland)

10 April 2025
17:30

| Poland | 6–0 | Turkey |
|---|---|---|
| Madziąg 6:15; Leszczak 12:22; Betowski 20:51; Kubik 35:37; Szardrski 36:59; Kąkol 38:21 | Report |

Municipal Sport Hall in Mielec, Mielec
Referee: Telmen Undrakh (Norway), Dag Erik Tangvik (Norway)
10 April 2025
17:30

| Moldova | 5–3 | Slovakia |
|---|---|---|
| Cojocaru 8:33, 31:31, 35:36; Obadă 21:34; Lașcu 26:12 | Report | Zaťovič 15:16; Marton 32:56; Ševčík 39:02 |

FMF Futsal Arena, Ciorescu
Referee: Vlad Nicolae Ciobanu (Romania), Bogdan Hanceariuc (Romania)

15 April 2025
13:00

| Turkey | 1–5 | Moldova |
|---|---|---|
| Kahan Özcan 39:58 | Report | Obadă 3:31; Laşcu 8:16; Cojocaru 16:31; Burdujel 18:14; Crasnov 19:35 |

Gazanfer Bilge Spor Salonu, Kocaeli
Referee: Dejan Veselič (Slovenia), Admir Zahovič (Slovenia)
15 April 2025
17:30

| Slovakia | 1–0 | Poland |
|---|---|---|
| Zaťovič 33:40 | Report |

Gopass Arena, Bratislava
Referee: Daniel Matkovic (Switzerland), Darko Boskovic (Switzerland)

=== Group 4 ===
| Pos | Team | Pld | W | D | L | GF | GA | GD | Pts | Qualification |
|---|---|---|---|---|---|---|---|---|---|---|
| 1 | Slovenia | 6 | 5 | 1 | 0 | 26 | 12 | +14 | 16 | Final tournament |
| 2 | Hungary | 6 | 3 | 1 | 2 | 21 | 14 | +7 | 10 | Play-offs |
| 3 | Norway | 6 | 2 | 0 | 4 | 11 | 18 | −7 | 6 | |
| 4 | Montenegro | 6 | 1 | 0 | 5 | 12 | 26 | −14 | 3 | |

Source: UEFA
Rules for classification: Tiebreakers
12 December 2024
18:00

| Hungary | 5–0 | Montenegro |
|---|---|---|
| Pál 0:30, 34:19, 37:24, 38:10; Hadházi 1:29 | Report |

Pálffy István Rendezvénycsarnok, Berettyóújfalu
Attendance: 775
Referee: Yiangos Yiangou (Cyprus), Nicolas Nicolaou (Cyprus)
12 December 2024
18:00

| Norway | 1–2 | Slovenia |
|---|---|---|
| Økland 19:57 | Report | Fideršek 11:19; Osredkar 16:20 |

Ulteirahallen, Trondheim
Attendance: 830
Referee: Šarūnas Tamulynas (Lithuania), Darko Boskovic (Switzerland)

16 December 2024
18:00

| Montenegro | 0–1 | Norway |
|---|---|---|
| | Report | Økland 15:38 |

Verde Complex, Podgorica
Referee: Stefan Vrijens (Belgium), Juan Boelen (Belgium)
18 December 2024
18:00

| Slovenia | 5–4 | Hungary |
|---|---|---|
| Čeh 8:55; Fideršek 9:19, 16:16, 27:28; Duščak 28:09 | Report | Rutai 10:14, 10:59; Rábl 35:13; Szalmás 37:58 |

Tivoli Hall, Ljubljana
Referee: Bogdan Hanceariuc (Romania), Vlad Nicolae Ciobanu (Romania)

6 March 2025
18:00

| Montenegro | 3–7 | Slovenia |
|---|---|---|
| Cimbaljević 29:44, 31:07; Vuletić 38:37 | Report | Janež 0:27; Fideršek 3:50; Vuletić 8:40 (o.g.); Osredkar 25:42; Turk 28:33; Knežević 29:52; Čop 31:44 |

Verde Complex, Podgorica
Referee: Ingus Puriņš (Latvia), Sergejs Šacmans (Latvia)
7 March 2025

| Hungary | 4–0 | Norway |
|---|---|---|
| Suscsák 12:58; Dróth 19:41; Rábl 21:04; Pál 29:58 | Report |

Continental Arena, Nyiregyhaza
Referee: Denys Kutsyi (Ukraine), Yevhen Hordiienko (Ukraine)

11 March 2025
18:00

| Slovenia | 5–1 | Montenegro |
|---|---|---|
| Fideršek 7:23; Osredkar 10:13, 38:05; Đurić 21:12; Čop 26:42 | Report | Vuletić 34:15 |

Tivoli Hall, Ljubljana
Referee: Yiangos Yiangou (Cyprus), Michael Christofides (Cyprus)
12 March 2025
18:00

| Norway | 4–2 | Hungary |
|---|---|---|
| Dønnem 15:32; Røttingsnes 16:20; M. Johansen 22:14; Schjetne 28:44 | Report | Bencsik 16:52; Pál 25:24 |

Tistedalshallen, Tistedal
Referee: Daniele D'adamo (San Marino), Laurentiu Ilie (San Marino)

10 April 2025
17:00

| Slovenia | 4–0 | Norway |
|---|---|---|
| Bukovec 8:56, 28:40; Čeh 23:14, 33:28 | Report |

Tabor Hall, Maribor
Referee: Chiara Perona (Italy), Simone Zanfino (Italy)
10 April 2025
18:00

| Montenegro | 2–3 | Hungary |
|---|---|---|
| Spasojević 4:15; Cimbaljević 38:46 | Report | Rábl 16:52; Kajtár 17:11; Hadházi 25:30 |

Verde Complex, Podgorica
Referee: Lars van Leeuwen (Netherlands), Joern Te Kloeze (Netherlands)

15 April 2025
17:00

| Hungary | 3–3 | Slovenia |
|---|---|---|
| Kajtár 13:31; Hadházi 14:30; Rábl 21:16 | Report | Čop 1:57; Đurić 14:47; Turk 39:43 |

Pálffy István Rendezvénycsarnok, Berettyóújfalu
Referee: Petar Radojcic (Serbia), Nikola Rabrenović (Serbia)
15 April 2025
17:00

| Norway | 5–6 | Montenegro |
|---|---|---|
| Welo 0:43; Dønnem 1:09; Andreassen 16:19; M. Johansen 32:59; Løkken 39:31 | Report | Delić 4:43; Bulatović 10:37, 19:45; Nikolić 11:32; Vuletić 22:09; Vukčević 30:54 |

Apalløkka idrettshall, Oslo
Referee: Volha Pauliuts (Belarus), Aliaksandr Auramau (Belarus)

=== Group 5 ===
| Pos | Team | Pld | W | D | L | GF | GA | GD | Pts | Qualification |
|---|---|---|---|---|---|---|---|---|---|---|
| 1 | Croatia | 6 | 6 | 0 | 0 | 29 | 7 | +22 | 18 | Final tournament |
| 2 | Greece | 6 | 2 | 1 | 3 | 11 | 16 | −5 | 7 (Note: Tied on head-to-head points. Head-to-head goal difference: Greece +1, Sweden –1.) | |
| 3 | Sweden | 6 | 2 | 1 | 3 | 16 | 21 | −5 | 7 | |
| 4 | Azerbaijan | 6 | 0 | 2 | 4 | 13 | 25 | −12 | 2 | |

Source: UEFA
Rules for classification: Tiebreakers
Notes:
11 December 2024
18:00

| Sweden | 1–4 | Greece |
|---|---|---|
| Fazlija 17:42 | Report | Ntatis 1:09 (pen.); Simos 4:56, 24:04; Gousis 11:01 |

Gavlehovshallen, Gävle
Attendance: 1,768
Referee: Slawomir Steczko (Poland), Dominik Cipinski (Poland)

17 December 2024
17:00

| Azerbaijan | 3–3 | Sweden |
|---|---|---|
| Rustamli 1:17, 39:58; Aghalizada 22:48 | Report | Furublad 13:28; Söderqvist 33:52; Johansson 37:06 |

Baku Sports Palace, Baku
Referee: Aslan Galayev (Kazakhstan), Turekhan Tursumbayev (Kazakhstan)

31 January 2025
19:15

| Croatia | 9–2 | Azerbaijan |
|---|---|---|
| Perić 2:49; Čekol 10:54; Kuraja 15:44, 25:20; Jelovčić 21:21; Moravac 29:23; Mataja 31:14; Postružin 35:58; Vukmir 39:16 | Report | U. Aliyev 27:11; Rustamli 32:12 |

Mate Parlov Sport Centre, Pula
Referee: Viktor Bugenko (Moldova), Grigori Ošomkov (Estonia)

4 February 2025
17:00

| Azerbaijan | 2–2 | Greece |
|---|---|---|
| Rustamli 0:52; Papakostas 38:42 (o.g.) | Report | Tankas 14:25; Ntatis 37:24 |

Baku Sports Palace, Baku
Referee: Telmen Undrakh (Norway), Jacob Pawlowski (Germany)
4 February 2025
19:00

| Sweden | 2–3 | Croatia |
|---|---|---|
| Zhubi 20:28; Azizi 24:13 | Report | Perić 17:33, 36:30; Čekol 19:32 |

Estrad Alingsås, Alingsås
Referee: Miguel Castilho (Portugal), Cristiano Santos (Portugal)

7 March 2025
19:00

| Greece | 0–1 | Croatia |
|---|---|---|
| | Report | Mataja 8:18 |

DAIS Sports Hall, Athens
Referee: Nicola Manzione (Italy), Giulio Colombin (Italy)

11 March 2025
19:00

| Greece | 3–2 | Azerbaijan |
|---|---|---|
| Adamopoulos 2:11; Papakostas 30:39; Ntatis 39:56 | Report | Manafov 32:39, 39:37 |

DAIS Sports Hall, Athens
Referee: Trayan Enchev (Bulgaria), Kaloyan Kirilov (Bulgaria)
11 March 2025
20:00

| Croatia | 6–2 | Sweden |
|---|---|---|
| Kustura 6:49; Čekol 9:47; Jelovčić 21:38; Kuraja 23:21; Jurlina 36:38, 39:23 | Report | Johansson 26:58; Zhubi 32:04 |

Dvorana Vijuš, Slavonski Brod
Referee: Filip Nesnera (Czechia), Radim Cep (Czechia)

11 April 2025
18:00

| Sweden | 4–3 | Azerbaijan |
|---|---|---|
| Söderqvist 10:23, 36:41; Zhubi 14:59; Gashi 38:03 | Report | Rustamli 1:07, 1:46; Baghirov 11:50 |

Helsingborg Arena, Helsingborg
Referee: Peter Nurse (England), Jordan Griffiths (England)
11 April 2025
18:00

| Croatia | 6–0 | Greece |
|---|---|---|
| Gudasic (0:22); Perić (1:49); Čekol (3:09); Jurlina (11:08); Barbarić (29:15) | Report |

Varaždin Arena, Varaždin
Referee: Maximilian Alkofer (Germany), Jacob Pawlowski (Germany)

15 April 2025
18:00

| Greece | 2–4 | Sweden |
|---|---|---|
| Papakostas 13:41; Ntatis 19:16 | Report | Johansson 11:38; Mossberg 24:17; Gousis 25:28 (o.g.); Sääf 39:55 |

DAIS Sports Hall, Athens
Referee: Juan Boelen (Belgium), Jiri Bergs (Belgium)
15 April 2025
19:00

| Azerbaijan | 1–4 | Croatia |
|---|---|---|
| Rustamli 21:05 | Report | Mataja 5:56, 11:05; Jurlina 8:48; Gudasic 31:33 |

Baku Sports Palace, Baku
Referee: Yiangos Yiangou (Cyprus), Nicolas Nicolaou (Cyprus)

=== Group 6 ===
| Pos | Team | Pld | W | D | L | GF | GA | GD | Pts | Qualification |
|---|---|---|---|---|---|---|---|---|---|---|
| 1 | Armenia | 6 | 5 | 1 | 0 | 24 | 11 | +13 | 16 | Final tournament |
| 2 | Kazakhstan | 6 | 3 | 1 | 2 | 21 | 16 | +5 | 10 | Play-offs |
| 3 | Denmark | 6 | 2 | 0 | 4 | 18 | 23 | −5 | 6 | |
| 4 | Albania | 6 | 1 | 0 | 5 | 10 | 23 | −13 | 3 | |

Source: UEFA
Rules for classification: Tiebreakers
13 December 2024
19:00

| Albania | 0–2 | Kazakhstan |
|---|---|---|
| | Report | Leo 4:43; Daribay 38:57 |

Tirana Olympic Park, Tirana
Referee: Marc Birkett (England), Peter Nurse (England)
14 December 2024
17:00

| Armenia | 4–3 | Denmark |
|---|---|---|
| Melikyan 12:51; Petrosov 15:51; Nevedrov 20:13; Dermenjyan 22:56 | Report | Gantzhorn 2:34; Youssef 9:26; Hansen 27:03 |

FFA Technical Center Academy, Yerevan
Referee: Dominykas Norkus (Lithuania), Mantas Pomeckis (Lithuania)

18 December 2024
15:30

| Kazakhstan | 4–4 | Armenia |
|---|---|---|
| Yesenamanov 18:43; Douglas Junior 26:40, 32:40; Valiullin 31:20 | Report | Melikyan 5:07; Dermenjyan 29:35, 36:31; Petrosov 33:43 |

Baluan Sholak Sports Palace, Almaty
Referee: Lars Van Leeuwen (Netherlands), Ibrahim El Jilali (Netherlands)
18 December 2024
18:00

| Denmark | 3–4 | Albania |
|---|---|---|
| Gantzhorn 3:31; Danmark 22:31; Fogt 28:44 | Report | Selmanaj 18:06; Toma 31:36; Halimi 35:39; Kryeziu 39:53 |

Brøndbyhallen, Brøndby
Referee: Cédric Pelissier (France), Victor Chaix (France)

1 February 2025
14:00

| Armenia | 4–0 | Albania |
|---|---|---|
| Nevedrov 15:54, 25:04; Petrosov 23:21; Sanosyan 35:25 | Report |

FFA Technical Center Academy, Yerevan
Referee: Damian Grabowski (Poland), Pawel Tokarewicz (Poland)
1 February 2025
15:00

| Denmark | 3–2 | Kazakhstan |
|---|---|---|
| Fogt 26:36; Youssef 33:49, 37:11 | Report | Serikov 30:40; Tursagulov 39:56 |

Broager Sparekasse Skansen, Sønderborg
Referee: Rastislav Behancin (Slovakia), Martin Matula (Slovakia)

5 February 2025
18:30

| Kazakhstan | 7–3 | Denmark |
|---|---|---|
| Rasmussen 0:25 (o.g.); Douglas Junior 1:23, 7:56; Daribay 5:58; Valiullin 27:54; Kairbay 31:18; Tursagulov 34:48 (pen.) | Report | Tursagulov 2:49 (o.g.), 10:22 (o.g.); Kasumovic 5:22 |

Jekpe-Jek Hall, Astana
Referee: Dominykas Norkus (Lithuania), Mantas Pomeckis (Lithuania)
5 February 2025
19:00

| Albania | 1–5 | Armenia |
|---|---|---|
| Kryeziu 38:41 | Report | Nevedrov 21:48, 26:28, 36:31; Melkonyan 30:26; Khromykh 38:53 |

Tirana Olympic Park, Tirana
Referee: Daniel Matkovic (Switzerland), Darko Boskovic (Switzerland)

7 March 2025
19:00

| Kazakhstan | 4–2 | Albania |
|---|---|---|
| Kairbay 6:25; Leo 6:42, 16:26; Yesenamanov 25:41 | Report | Shkodra 23:24; Toma 38:55 |

Jekpe-Jek Hall, Astana
Referee: Bogdan Hanceariuc (Romania), Vlad Nicolae Ciobanu (Romania)
8 March 2025
14:00

| Denmark | 1–3 | Armenia |
|---|---|---|
| Søgaard 25:29 | Report | Khromykh 14:19; Mashumyan 23:02; Sanosyan 24:50 |

Arena Nord, Frederikshavn
Referee: Damian Grabowski (Poland), Dominik Cipinski (Poland)

12 March 2025
16:00

| Armenia | 4–2 | Kazakhstan |
|---|---|---|
| Khromykh 6:14, 13:18, 23:55; Agadzhanov 27:28 | Report | Tursagulov 15:32; Agadzhanov 32:56 (o.g.) |

FFA Technical Center Academy, Yerevan
Referee: Maximilian Alkofer (Germany), Sven Schreiber (Germany)
12 April 2025
18:00

| Albania | 3–5 | Denmark |
|---|---|---|
| Selmanaj 2:10, 38:00; Kasumovic 11:43 (o.g.) | Report | Falck 10:55; O. Hansen 14:43; Jørgensen 19:35 (pen.); M. Hansen 32:13; Gantzhorn 39:09 |

Mizahir Isma Hall, Rahovec, Kosovo
Referee: Vasilios Christodoulis (Greece), Panagiotis Ntalas (Greece)

=== Group 7 ===
| Pos | Team | Pld | W | D | L | GF | GA | GD | Pts | Qualification |
|---|---|---|---|---|---|---|---|---|---|---|
| 1 | Portugal | 6 | 6 | 0 | 0 | 31 | 9 | +22 | 18 | Final tournament |
| 2 | Netherlands | 6 | 2 | 2 | 2 | 19 | 17 | +2 | 8 | |
| 3 | Andorra | 6 | 1 | 3 | 2 | 11 | 20 | −9 | 6 | |
| 4 | North Macedonia | 6 | 0 | 1 | 5 | 3 | 18 | −15 | 1 | |

Source: UEFA
Rules for classification: Tiebreakers
13 December 2024
20:00

| Andorra | 2–7 | Portugal |
|---|---|---|
| Domenjo 4:12; Blat 25:04 | Report | Lúcio Jr. 6:29, 28:08, 30:52; Neves 14:40, 36:06; Ferreira 23:39; Kutchy 37:18 |

Poliesportiu d'Andorra, Andorra la Vella
Referee: Mariia Myslovska (Ukraine), Yevhen Hordiienko (Ukraine)
13 December 2024
19:30

| Netherlands | 4–0 | North Macedonia |
|---|---|---|
| Boukhari 6:32, 27:37; Ouaddouh 7:09; Attahiri 27:29 | Report |

Topsportcentrum, Almere
Referee: Telmen Undrakh (Norway), Dag Erik Tangvik (Norway)

18 December 2024
19:00

| North Macedonia | 1–1 | Andorra |
|---|---|---|
| Petrović 33:39 | Report | Josep Segura 34:15 |

SC Jane Sandanski, Skopje
Referee: Maximilian Alkofer (Germany), Christian Gundler (Germany)
18 December 2024
21:15

| Portugal | 4–2 | Netherlands |
|---|---|---|
| Brito 14:13; Santos 21:11, 39:00; Varela 28:23 | Report | Ouaddouh 26:21; Ceyar 27:34 |

Pavilhão Desportivo Municipal, Póvoa de Varzim
Referee: Chiara Perona (Italy), Giulio Colombin (Italy)

31 January 2025
19:00

| North Macedonia | 1–5 | Portugal |
|---|---|---|
| Ramadan 8:46 | Report | Diogo Santos 10:58; João Matos 15:01; Hugo Neves 17:23, 28:45; Pany Varela 29:41 |

SC Jane Sandanski small hall, Skopje
Referee: Yiangos Yiangou (Cyprus), Stephen Vella (Malta)
1 February 2025
19:30

| Netherlands | 5–5 | Andorra |
|---|---|---|
| Chih 12:46; van der Wal 18:36, 35:25; Martinus 27:52; Boukhari 36:57 | Report | Torres Domenjo 5:54; Rodríguez 6:31; Adrià Blat 15:33; Ons 29:59 (o.g.); Rodriguez Sierra 31:31 |

Sportcentrum Maaspoort, 's-Hertogenbosch
Referee: Besart Ismajli (Kosovo), Besar Beqiri (Kosovo)

5 February 2025
14:00

| Andorra | 1–1 | Netherlands |
|---|---|---|
| Oriol Rodriguez 21:13 | Report | Attahiri 3:27 |

Poliesportiu d'Andorra, Andorra la Vella
Referee: Marjan Mladenovsk (North Macedonia), Martin Køster (Denmark)
5 February 2025
20:00

| Portugal | 3–0 | North Macedonia |
|---|---|---|
| Hugo Neves 12:32; André Coelho 26:58; Bruno Coelho 34:47 | Report |

Pavilhão Desportivo Municipal, Póvoa de Varzim
Referee: Ugur Cakmak (Turkey), Hakan Tezcan (Turkey)

7 March 2025
19:00

| North Macedonia | 0–3 | Netherlands |
|---|---|---|
| | Report | Kemps (23:42); Martinus (24:48) |

SC Jane Sandanski, Skopje
Referee: Volha Pauliuts (Belarus), Aliaksandr Auramau (Belarus)
7 March 2025
19:00

| Portugal | 5–0 | Andorra |
|---|---|---|
| Diogo Santos 7:03, 39:32; Pedro Santos 19:51; Pany Varela 20:28; Afonso Jesus 24:27 | Report |

Pavilhão Multiusos de Paredes, Paredes
Referee: Telmen Undrakh (Norway), Dag Erik Tangvik (Norway)

12 March 2025
19:30

| Netherlands | 4–7 | Portugal |
|---|---|---|
| Martinus 7:33; Boukhari 14:23, 27:50; Kemps 18:15 | Report | Lúcio Jr 4:10, 12:39, 29:09; Carlos Monteiro 11:56; Pany Varela 16:56; Bernardo Paçó 25:09; Bruno Maior 39:23 |

Topsportcentrum, Almere
Referee: Darko Boskovic (Switzerland), David Schaerli (Switzerland)
12 March 2025
19:00

| Andorra | 2–1 | North Macedonia |
|---|---|---|
| Christian Regalo 35:50; Adrià Blat 36:32 | Report | Mar. Todorovski 36:26 |

Poliesportiu d'Andorra, Andorra la Vella
Referee: Peter Nurse (England), Oliver Rodriguez-Ballinger (England)

=== Group 8 ===
| Pos | Team | Pld | W | D | L | GF | GA | GD | Pts | Qualification |
|---|---|---|---|---|---|---|---|---|---|---|
| 1 | Spain | 6 | 6 | 0 | 0 | 37 | 3 | +34 | 18 | Final tournament |
| 2 | Bosnia and Herzegovina | 6 | 4 | 0 | 2 | 32 | 13 | +19 | 12 | Play-offs |
| 3 | England | 6 | 1 | 1 | 4 | 11 | 27 | −16 | 4 | |
| 4 | Switzerland | 6 | 0 | 1 | 5 | 6 | 43 | −37 | 1 | |

Source: UEFA
Rules for classification: Tiebreakers
12 December 2024
20:00

| Switzerland | 0–9 | Spain |
|---|---|---|
| | Report | Paniagua 7:55, 18:48; Esteban 10:47, 39:18; Mayor 16:30, 18:18; Cecilio 21:42; Rivillos 32:17 (pen.); Furtado 33:12 |

Sporthalle Weissenstein, Bern
Attendance: 1,651
Referee: Ondřej Černý (Czechia), Radim Cep (Czechia)
13 December 2024
20:15

| Bosnia and Herzegovina | 5–1 | England |
|---|---|---|
| Radujković 5:01; J. Sesar 19:20; Brkanić 25:53; Baručija 28:49; Edge 30:10 (o.g.) | Report | Goldstein 23:40 (pen.) |

Gradska Arena Husejin Smajlović, Zenica
Referee: Ivo Tsenov (Bulgaria), Kaloyan Kirilov (Bulgaria)

16 December 2024
20:30

| England | 5–1 | Switzerland |
|---|---|---|
| Palfreeman 2:25, 35:24, 38:12; Goldstein 19:15; Walsh 24:17 | Report | Marcoyannakis 8:48 |

Sir David Wallace Sports Hall, Loughborough
Referee: Vasilios Christodoulis (Greece), Antonios Adamopoulos (Greece)
17 December 2024
20:45

| Spain | 6–1 | Bosnia and Herzegovina |
|---|---|---|
| Cecilio 7:27; Bebe 9:12; Ramirez 12:58; Lopes 15:03; Esteban 34:20; Pérez 37:34 | Report | Mayor 34:33 (o.g.) |

Palacio de los Deportes, Cartagena
Referee: Josip Barton (North Macedonia), Done Ristovski (North Macedonia)

4 February 2025
20:15

| Bosnia and Herzegovina | 10–1 | Switzerland |
|---|---|---|
| Radujković 11:27; Bošković 11:42, 16:46; Todorić 15:04, 25:12; S. Ivanković 18:13; J. Sesar 20:57; Baručija 31:27; Arnautović 31:47; Brkanić 35:41 | Report | Lanzendorfer 24:07 |

Gradska Arena Husejin Smajlović, Zenica
Referee: Mariia Myslovska (Ukraine), Denys Kutsyi (Ukraine)
4 February 2025
20:30

| England | 0–6 | Spain |
|---|---|---|
| | Report | Javivi 10:20, 37:19; Adrián 18:37; García 22:02; Mellado 28:01; Ricardo Mayor 35:43 |

Sir David Wallace Sports Hall, Loughborough
Referee: Roosa-Maria Karoliina Tuomi (Finland), Kastriot Gerxhaliu (Sweden)

6 March 2025
19:00

| Switzerland | 0–9 | Bosnia and Herzegovina |
|---|---|---|
| | Report | J. Sesar 2:10, 39:39; Gosto 2:32; Baručija 4:35; Todorić 7:13; Brkanić 16:45; Pavlović 17:57, 25:56; Bošković 31:01 |

AXA Arena, Winterthur
Referee: Jiri Bergs (Belgium), Stijn Lehembre (Belgium)
7 March 2025
21:00

| Spain | 7–0 | England |
|---|---|---|
| López 9:53, 32:29, 39:33, 39:55; Pol 15:47, 38:39; Rivillos 37:03 | Report |

Pabellón Javier Lozano Cid, Toledo
Referee: Petar Radojcic (Serbia), Nikola Rabrenović (Serbia)

11 March 2025
19:00

| Spain | 6–0 | Switzerland |
|---|---|---|
| Adrián Rivera 12:14, 26:47; Alvarez 13:23; Cecillio 19:11; Pol 25:18; Gordillo 29:31 | Report |

Pabellon Deportivo Pedro Delgado, Segovia
Referee: Idan Berenshtein (Israel), Raafat Al Hamola (Israel)
11 March 2025
19:30

| England | 2–5 | Bosnia and Herzegovina |
|---|---|---|
| Goldstein 37:31; Barnes 39:20 | Report | Milanović 3:24, 29:38; Todorić 10:01; J. Sesar 19:35; Bošković 39:55 |

Sir David Wallace Sports Hall, Loughborough
Referee: Dominykas Norkus (Lithuania), Mantas Pomeckis (Lithuania)

15 April 2025
17:00

| Bosnia and Herzegovina | 2–3 | Spain |
|---|---|---|
| Kalajdžić 12:02; Brkanić 28:15 | Report | Sergio González 1:35; García 10:27; Adrián Rivera 10:36 |

Gradska Arena Husejin Smajlović, Zenica
Referee: Arttu Kyynaeraeinen (Finland), Kirill Naishouler (Finland)
15 April 2025
19:00

| Switzerland | 4–4 | England |
|---|---|---|
| Ljamalari 2:03; Xhemajli 17:50; Marcoyannakis 35:04, 38:36 | Report | Mcgrath 10:50; Tozer 13:02, 18:01, 32:13 |

Centre Sportif Des Iles, Yverdon
Referee: Radim Cep (Czechia), Ingus Puriņš (Latvia)

=== Group 9 ===
| Pos | Team | Pld | W | D | L | GF | GA | GD | Pts | Qualification |
|---|---|---|---|---|---|---|---|---|---|---|
| 1 | Czechia | 6 | 5 | 1 | 0 | 23 | 9 | +14 | 16 | Final tournament |
| 2 | Belgium | 6 | 4 | 0 | 2 | 21 | 12 | +9 | 12 | Play-offs |
| 3 | Serbia | 6 | 2 | 1 | 3 | 22 | 19 | +3 | 7 | |
| 4 | Austria | 6 | 0 | 0 | 6 | 7 | 33 | −26 | 0 | |

Source: UEFA
Rules for classification: Tiebreakers
13 December 2024
17:00

| Austria | 1–6 | Serbia |
|---|---|---|
| Gager 30:12 | Report | Lazarević 13:34, 36:21; Petrov 13:48; Rosić 16:05; A. Tomić 18:16; Vasić 23:35 |

BSFZ Südstadt, Halle 1, Maria Enzersdorf
Referee: Kirill Naishouler (Finland), Arttu Kyynaeraeinen (Finland)
13 December 2024
19:00

| Czechia | 3–0 | Belgium |
|---|---|---|
| D. Drozd 0:34; Seidler 20:34; Paulus 24:25 (o.g.) | Report |

TJ Lokomotiva, Plzeň
Referee: Hikmat Qafarli (Azerbaijan), Knyaz Amiraslanov (Azerbaijan)

18 December 2024
18:00

| Serbia | 4–4 | Czechia |
|---|---|---|
| Lazarević 24:28, 38:24; D. Tomić 28:41, 36:57 | Report | P. Drozd 2:19; Knobloch 7:09; D. Drozd 12:07; Záruva 15:23 |

Zorka Šabac Sports Hall, Šabac
Referee: Gábor Kovács (Hungary), Norbert Szilágyi (Hungary)

31 January 2025
20:00

| Belgium | 7–2 | Austria |
|---|---|---|
| Buyl 3:35; Rahou 8:01; Aabbou 18:12; Ghislandi 18:37; Cordier 24:16, 37:47; Vanderheyden 39:09 | Report | M. Sadílek 37:33; Gréllo 38:12 (o.g.) |

Belleheide Center, Roosdaal
Referee: Peter Nurse (England), Oliver Rodriguez-Ballinger (England)

4 February 2025
19:30

| Czechia | 5–2 | Austria |
|---|---|---|
| Künstner 4:45; P. Drozd 20:34; Seidler 25:15; Záruba 31:07; Knobloch 38:37 | Report | Rajkovic 12:31; Vukovic 39:59 |

TJ Lokomotiva, Plzeň
Referee: Dejan Veselič (Slovenia), Aleš Mocnik Peric (Slovenia)
5 February 2025
20:00

| Belgium | 8–3 | Serbia |
|---|---|---|
| Vaelen 4:48; Rahou 9:42, 21:38, 38:49; Cordier 13:46; Vanderheyden 15:04, 32:49; Gréllo 34:15 | Report | Petrov 7:50; Vasić 9:13; D. Tomić 21:20 |

Belleheide Center, Roosdaal
Referee: Aslan Galayev (Kazakhstan), Nurlybek Kalimaganbetov (Kazakhstan)

7 March 2025
18:30

| Serbia | 1–2 | Belgium |
|---|---|---|
| A. Tomić 20:26 | Report | Aabbou 39:28; Rahou 39:58 |

Sportska hala Smederevo, Smederevo
Referee: Pablo Delgado Sastre (Spain), David Urdánoz Apezteguía (Spain)

8 March 2025
18:00

| Austria | 0–6 | Czechia |
|---|---|---|
| | Report | Křivánek 10:23; Záruba 13:56, 17:50, 30:05; Mikus Fernandes 19:06; Seidler 28:24 |

ASKÖ Sportcenter, Graz
Referee: Farik Keco (Bosnia and Herzegovina), Nikola Tadic (Bosnia and Herzegovina)
12 March 2025
16:00

| Belgium | 2–3 | Czechia |
|---|---|---|
| Rahou 14:07; Ghislandi 38:38 | Report | D. Drozd 10:00; Záruba 16:58; Holý 24:02 |

Belleheide Center, Roosdaal
Referee: Nikola Jelić (Croatia), Dino Kramar (Croatia)

11 April 2025
17:00

| Serbia | 7–2 | Austria |
|---|---|---|
| Marinković 1:39; A. Tomić 11:26; Rakić 15:14, 23:33; D. Tomić 21:36; O. Pajković 31:52; Redžović 34:43 | Report | Flögel 4:06; Gager 23:51 |

Sports Hall Požarevac, Požarevac
Referee: Nicola Manzione (Italy), Dario Pezzuto (Italy)

16 April 2025
17:30

| Czechia | 2–1 | Serbia |
|---|---|---|
| Holý 30:15; D. Drozd 35:37 | Report | Petrov 19:53 |

Hala Polárka, Frýdek-Místek
Referee: Ruben António Cardoso Santos (Portugal), Cristiano Santos (Portugal)
16 April 2025
18:00

| Austria | 0–2 | Belgium |
|---|---|---|
| | Report | Dillien 15:46; Gréllo 22:06 |

Raiffeisen Sportpark, Graz
Referee: Denys Kutsyi (Ukraine), Orest Dutsiak (Ukraine)

=== Group 10 ===
| Pos | Team | Pld | W | D | L | GF | GA | GD | Pts | Qualification |
|---|---|---|---|---|---|---|---|---|---|---|
| 1 | France | 6 | 5 | 1 | 0 | 41 | 9 | +32 | 16 | Final tournament |
| 2 | Georgia | 6 | 4 | 1 | 1 | 22 | 12 | +10 | 13 | Play-offs |
| 3 | Kosovo | 6 | 2 | 0 | 4 | 16 | 25 | −9 | 6 | |
| 4 | Bulgaria | 6 | 0 | 0 | 6 | 7 | 40 | −33 | 0 | |

Source: UEFA
Rules for classification: Tiebreakers
13 December 2024
18:00

| Georgia | 3–1 | Kosovo |
|---|---|---|
| Ghavtadze 11:23, 21:59; Sebiskveradze 31:29 | Report | Qerimi 10:42 |

Tbilisi Sports Palace, Tbilisi
Referee: Ademir Avdic (Sweden), David Glavonjic (Sweden)
13 December 2024
16:30

| Bulgaria | 0–11 | France |
|---|---|---|
| | Report | Mouhoudine 0:10, 22:35; Lutin 2:18, 21:48, 23:16, 31:46; Guirio 19:58, 29:18; Menendez 23:49; Benslama 36:21; Tchato 39:31 |

Arena Samokov, Samokov
Referee: Petar Radojcic (Serbia), Nikola Rabrenović (Serbia)

17 December 2024
20:00

| Kosovo | 6–2 | Bulgaria |
|---|---|---|
| Alaj 2:13; Mazreku 6:20; Kameri 10:45; Maxharraj 23:05; Qerimi 34:55; Krasniqi 37:34 | Report | P. Stoykov 12:23; M. Stoykov 31:02 |

Palace of Youth and Sports, Pristina
Referee: Aleš Mocnik Peric (Slovenia), Admir Zahovič (Slovenia)
17 December 2024
21:15

| France | 5–2 | Georgia |
|---|---|---|
| Mouhoudine 9:30, 22:03; Guirio 14:19; Boutia 24:31, 27:54 | Report | Ghavtadze 30:48; Gabrichidze 39:46 |

CO'Met Arena, Orléans
Referee: Ruben António Cardoso Santos (Portugal), Miguel Castilho (Portugal)

31 January 2025
17:00

| Georgia | 6–1 | Bulgaria |
|---|---|---|
| Jvarashvili 5:27, 13:04; Chimakadze 10:00; Gabrichidze 14:53; Kharatishvili 38:40; Tkemaladze 39:03 | Report | Kuzov 39:49 |

Olympic Palace, Tbilisi
Referee: Vlad Nicolae Ciobanu (Romania), Laurentiu Deaconu (Romania)
31 January 2025
20:00

| Kosovo | 0–5 | France |
|---|---|---|
| | Report | Lutin 0:24; A. Mohammed 10:26, 33:33; Belhaj 12:15; Lokoka 19:59 |

Palace of Youth and Sports, Pristina
Referee: Arttu Kyynaeraeinen (Finland), Roosa-Maria Karoliina Tuomi (Finland)

4 February 2025

| Bulgaria | 1–5 | Georgia |
|---|---|---|
| Dimitrov 12:48 | Report | Kharatishvili 5:52; Ghavtadze 8:52, 22:38, 36:12; Berechikidze 9:48 |

Kolodruma, Plovdiv
Referee: George Jansizian (Sweden), David Glavonjic (Sweden)
4 February 2025
20:00

| France | 9–4 | Kosovo |
|---|---|---|
| Toure (1998) 7:30; Guirio 8:14; Mouhoudine 10:31, 21:16; Benslama 15:14; Zakehi 16:12; Luc M'Khamma 19:58, 37:12; Toure (2001) 39:15 | Report | Diar 0:35; Alaj 14:15; Maxharraj 15:55, 38:14 |

Arena Futuroscope, Chasseneuil-du-Poitou
Referee: Lars van Leeuwen (Netherlands), Joern Te Kloeze (Netherlands)

11 April 2025
19:00

| Kosovo | 1–3 | Georgia |
|---|---|---|
| Dervishaj 30:58 | Report | Ghavtadze 15:33; Kharatishvili 31:21; Sebiskveradze 37:16 |

Palace of Youth and Sports, Pristina
Referee: Ondřej Černý (Czechia), Jan Kresta (Czechia)
11 April 2025
20:05

| France | 8–0 | Bulgaria |
|---|---|---|
| Toure 4:20, 16:38; Koné 7:23, 35:14; Bendali 13:57; Toure 24:30; Mouhoudine 38:40; Andrade 39:23 | Report |

Arena Saint-Etienne Métropole, Saint-Chamond
Referee: Grigori Ošomkov (Estonia), Viktor Bugenko (Moldova)

16 April 2025
17:00

| Bulgaria | 3–4 | Kosovo |
|---|---|---|
| A. Petrov 13:47; Minchev 15:54, 22:10 | Report | Krasniqi 5:49, 24:39, 34:06; Diar 12:21 |

Kolodruma, Plovdiv
Referee: Dominykas Norkus (Lithuania), Irmantas Kaprašovas (Lithuania)
16 April 2025
21:33

| Georgia | 3–3 | France |
|---|---|---|
| Svanidze 4:50; Jvarashvili 5:26; Sebiskveradze 31:33 | Report | Andrade 19:04; A. Mohammed 23:05; Lutin 29:33 |

Olympic Palace, Tbilisi
Referee: Nikola Jelić (Croatia), Mislav Džeko (Croatia)

=== Ranking of second-placed teams ===
| Pos | Grp | Team | Pld | W | D | L | GF | GA | GD | Pts | Qualification |
|---|---|---|---|---|---|---|---|---|---|---|---|
| 1 | 2 | Italy | 6 | 4 | 1 | 1 | 25 | 9 | +16 | 13 | Play-offs |
| 2 | 10 | Georgia | 6 | 4 | 1 | 1 | 22 | 12 | +10 | 13 | Play-offs |
| 3 | 8 | Bosnia and Herzegovina | 6 | 4 | 0 | 2 | 32 | 13 | +19 | 12 | Play-offs |
| 4 | 9 | Belgium | 6 | 4 | 0 | 2 | 21 | 12 | +9 | 12 | Play-offs |
| 5 | 3 | Slovakia | 6 | 4 | 0 | 2 | 23 | 19 | +4 | 12 | Play-offs |
| 6 | 4 | Hungary | 6 | 3 | 1 | 2 | 21 | 14 | +7 | 10 | Play-offs |
| 7 | 6 | Kazakhstan | 6 | 3 | 1 | 2 | 21 | 16 | +5 | 10 | Play-offs |
| 8 | 1 | Romania | 6 | 3 | 0 | 3 | 18 | 11 | +7 | 9 | Play-offs |
| 9 | 7 | Netherlands | 6 | 2 | 2 | 2 | 19 | 17 | +2 | 8 | |
| 10 | 5 | Greece | 6 | 2 | 1 | 3 | 11 | 16 | −5 | 7 | |

Source: UEFA
Rules for classification: 1) points; 2) goal difference; 3) goals scored; 4) disciplinary points; 5) coefficient ranking.

== Play-offs ==
=== Draw ===
The draw for the main round play-offs took place on 3 July 2025 at 12:00 CEST (UTC+2). The eight teams were drawn into four two-legged home-and-away ties to determine the last four qualifiers.

| Team 1 | Agg. | Team 2 | 1st leg | 2nd leg |
|---|---|---|---|---|
| Italy | 4–4 (2–0 p) | Kazakhstan | 2–1 | 2–3 (a.e.t.) (2–0 p) |
| Georgia | 7–6 | Slovakia | 4–1 | 3–5 |
| Hungary | 5–4 | Romania | 3–2 | 2–2 |
| Belgium | 8–2 | Bosnia and Herzegovina | 7–2 | 1–0 |

=== Matches ===
18 September 2025
20:00

| Italy | 2–1 | Kazakhstan |
|---|---|---|
| Pulvirenti 14:31; De Oliveira 28:49 | Report | Yesenamanov 31:56 |

Palasport Fasano, Fasano
Referee: Cristiano Santos (Portugal), Ruben António Cardoso Santos (Portugal)
23 September 2025
19:30

| Kazakhstan | 3–2 (a.e.t.) | Italy |
|---|---|---|
| Tursagulov 2:42; Akbalikov 16:10; Motta 34:26 (o.g.) | Report | Barichello 7:05; Turmena 31:58 |
Penalties
| Akbalikov (penalty missed); Knaub (penalty missed); Douglas Junior (penalty missed); Edson (penalty missed) | 0–2 | (penalty scored) Turmena; (penalty missed) Venâncio; (penalty scored) Motta |

Jekpe-Jek Hall, Astana
Referee: Alejandro Martinez Flores (Spain), Pablo Delgado Sastre (Spain)

4–4 on aggregate. Italy won 2–0 on penalties.

18 September 2025
20:00

| Georgia | 4–1 | Slovakia |
|---|---|---|
| Sebiskveradze 11:57, 34:55; Chimakadze 21:28; Tophuria 35:34 | Report | Bačo 24:54 |

Tbilisi Sports Palace, Tbilisi
Referee: Daniel Matkovic (Switzerland), David Schaerli (Switzerland)
23 September 2025
18:30

| Slovakia | 5–3 | Georgia |
|---|---|---|
| Drahovský 5:36, 16:47; Belaník 26:12; Zaťovič 32:05; Bačo 37:01 | Report | Chimakadze 15:08; Sebiskveradze 30:07; Todua 31:18 |

Gopass Arena, Bratislava
Referee: Petar Radojcic (Serbia), Nikola Rabrenović (Serbia)

Georgia won 7–6 on aggregate.

18 September 2025
20:00

| Hungary | 3–2 | Romania |
|---|---|---|
| Henrique Da Silva 21:41; Büki 31:29; Hadházi 37:32 | Report | Crișan 29:43; Gavrila 38:31 |

Főnix Aréna, Debrecen
Referee: Nikola Jelić (Croatia), Vedran Babic (Croatia)
24 September 2025
20:00

| Romania | 2–2 | Hungary |
|---|---|---|
| Nastai 4:16; Daniel Araujo 14:17 (pen.) | Report | Rábl 7:12; Büki 38:16 |

Polyvalent Hall, Craiova
Referee: Dejan Veselič (Slovenia), Aleš Mocnik Peric (Slovenia)

Hungary won 5–4 on aggregate.

19 September 2025
20:00

| Belgium | 7–2 | Bosnia and Herzegovina |
|---|---|---|
| Vanderheyden 10:39, 11:13; Ghislandi 12:04; Vaelen 14:56; Aabbou 17:28, 38:28; Cordier 39:10 | Report | S. Ivanković 17:10, 18:58 |

Lotto Arena, Antwerp
Referee: Nicola Manzione (Italy), Chiara Perona (Italy)
24 September 2025
20:00

| Bosnia and Herzegovina | 0–1 | Belgium |
|---|---|---|
| | Report | Ghislandi 27:11 |

Gradska Arena Husejin Smajlović, Zenica
Referee: Damian Grabowski (Poland), Monika Czudzinowicz (Poland)

Belgium won 8–2 on aggregate.

== Qualified teams ==
The following 16 teams qualified for UEFA Futsal Euro 2026.

| Team | Qualified as | Qualified on | Previous appearances in Futsal Euro^{1} |
|---|---|---|---|
| Latvia | Co-host | 2 December 2023 | 0 (Debut) |
| Lithuania | Co-host | 2 December 2023 | 0 (Debut) |
| Ukraine | Group 1 winners | 11 April 2025 | 11 (1996, 2001, 2003, 2005, 2007, 2010, 2012, 2014, 2016, 2018, 2022) |
| Belarus | Group 2 winners | 11 April 2025 | 1 (2010) |
| Poland | Group 3 winners | 10 April 2025 | 3 (2001, 2018, 2022) |
| Slovenia | Group 4 winners | 10 April 2025 | 7 (2003, 2010, 2012, 2014, 2016, 2018, 2022) |
| Croatia | Group 5 winners | 11 April 2025 | 6 (1999, 2001, 2012, 2014, 2016, 2022) |
| Armenia | Group 6 winners | 12 March 2025 | 0 (Debut) |
| Portugal | Group 7 winners | 5 February 2025 | 10 (1999, 2003, 2005, 2007, 2010, 2012, 2014, 2016, **2018**, **2022**) |
| Spain | Group 8 winners | 15 April 2025 | 12 (**1996**, 1999, **2001**, 2003, **2005**, **2007**, **2010**, **2012**, 2014, **2016**, 2018, 2022) |
| Czechia | Group 9 winners | 12 March 2025 | 8 (2001, 2003, 2005, 2007, 2010, 2012, 2014, 2016) |
| France | Group 10 winners | 16 April 2025 | 1 (2018) |
| Italy | Play-off winner | 23 September 2025 | 12 (1996, 1999, 2001, **2003**, 2005, 2007, 2010, 2012, **2014**, 2016, 2018, 2022) |
| Georgia | Play-off winner | 23 September 2025 | 1 (2022) |
| Hungary | Play-off winner | 24 September 2025 | 3 (2005, 2010, 2016) |
| Belgium | Play-off winner | 24 September 2025 | 5 (1996, 1999, 2003, 2010, 2014) |

^{1} Bold indicates champions for that year. Italic indicates hosts for that year.
