= 2025 Futsal Week June Cup =

Tournament details
- Host country: Croatia
- City: Poreč
- Dates: 18–22 June
- Teams: 4
- Venue: Finida Hall

Final positions
- Champions: France (1st title)
- Runners-up: Netherlands
- Third place: Montenegro
- Fourth place: Kyrgyzstan

Tournament statistics
- Top scorer: (France) Amine Geodoura
- Best player: (France) Marouane Rezzoug
- Best goalkeeper: (Kyrgyzstan) Uulu Ulan Chorobek
- Fair play award: Kyrgyzstan

The 2025 Futsal Week June Cup was an international men's futsal tournament hosted by Futsal Week, and held in Poreč, Croatia from 18 to 22 June 2025. France won the tournament.

== Teams ==
| Team | Appearance | Previous best performance |
|---|---|---|
| France | 1st | Debut |
| Kyrgyzstan | 1st | Debut |
| Montenegro | 12th | Champions (Spring 2019) |
| Netherlands | 2nd | Champions (Autumn 2017) |

== Standings ==
| Pos | Team | Pld | W | D | L | GF | GA | GD | Pts |
|---|---|---|---|---|---|---|---|---|---|
| 1 | France (C) | 3 | 2 | 0 | 1 | 12 | 7 | +5 | 6 |
| 2 | Netherlands | 3 | 2 | 0 | 1 | 9 | 7 | +2 | 6 |
| 3 | Montenegro | 3 | 1 | 0 | 2 | 8 | 12 | −4 | 3 |
| 4 | Kyrgyzstan | 3 | 1 | 0 | 2 | 6 | 9 | −3 | 3 |

Source: Futsal Planet
(C) Champions
18 June 2025
16:00

| Netherlands | 3–1 | Montenegro |
|---|---|---|
| | Report |

Finida Hall, Poreč, Croatia
18 June 2025
18:15

| Kyrgyzstan | 2–1 | France |
|---|---|---|
| Islam Turatbekov 26'; Kairat Kubanychov 37' | Report | Gora Diop 40' |

Finida Hall, Poreč, Croatia

20 June 2025
16:00

| Montenegro | 2–6 | France |
|---|---|---|
| Novica Calasan 25'; David Pauletic 40' | Report | Ismaël Khedir 16'; Leo Fraytre 16'; Amine Geddoura 20'; Kenan Tafic 20'; Mohamed Diaoune 22'; Matisse Henry 30' |

Finida Hall, Poreč, Croatia
20 June 2025
18:15

| Kyrgyzstan | 1–3 | Netherlands |
|---|---|---|
| | Report |

Finida Hall, Poreč, Croatia

21 June 2025
16:00

| Kyrgyzstan | 3–5 | Montenegro |
|---|---|---|
| | Report |

Finida Hall, Poreč, Croatia
21 June 2025
18:15

| France | 5–3 | Netherlands |
|---|---|---|
| Amine Geddoura 7', 15', 18', 27'; Akim Rafols 17' | Report | Mohamed Chih 2'; Tevfik Ceyar 13'; Oualid Tarifit 20' |

Finida Hall, Poreč, Croatia
