= Futsal Week =

International futsal competition

- Status: Active
- Country: Croatia
- Founded: 2013
- Founders: Mićo Martić, Matija Đulvat, and Marko Šimurina
- Next event: 2026 Futsal Week June Cup (men's); 2026 Futsal Week Women's February Cup (women's)
- Website: futsalweek.com

Futsal Week (Croatia International Futsal Cup) is a re-occurring futsal competition contested by teams from countries across the world.

== History ==
Futsal Week was founded in 2013 by Mićo Martić, Matija Đulvat, and Marko Šimurina. They organized their first competition that same year, in Zadar, Croatia.

== Results ==
=== Men's national teams ===
| Edition | Champions | Score | Runner-up | | Third place | Score | Fourth place | Teams |
|---|---|---|---|---|---|---|---|---|
| 2016 | Kosovo | —N/a | Finland | | Turkey | —N/a | —N/a | 3 |
| Winter 2017 | Israel | —N/a | Denmark | | San Marino | —N/a | —N/a | 3 |
| Winter 2 2017 | Slovenia | —N/a | Belgium | | Hungary | —N/a | —N/a | 3 |
| Summer 2017 | Finland | —N/a | Hungary | | China | —N/a | —N/a | 3 |
| Autumn 2017 | Netherlands | —N/a | Montenegro | | Switzerland | —N/a | —N/a | 3 |
| Winter 2018 | Kuwait | —N/a | Montenegro | | San Marino | —N/a | —N/a | 3 |
| Autumn 2018 | Hungary | —N/a | Kuwait | | Bosnia and Herzegovina | —N/a | Slovenia | 5 |
| Spring 2019 | Montenegro | —N/a | Hungary | | Sweden | —N/a | Tajikistan | 4 |
| Autumn 2019 | Belgium | 5–1 | Turkmenistan | | Saudi Arabia | 3–2 | Montenegro | 6 |
| Winter 2019 | Bosnia and Herzegovina | —N/a | Montenegro | | China | —N/a | Turkmenistan | 5 |
| Winter 2020 | Morocco | —N/a | Montenegro | | United States | —N/a | Moldova | 4 |
| Summer 2021 | Italy | 6–0 | Saudi Arabia | | Finland | 7–0 | Montenegro | 7 |
| Autumn 2021 | Finland | —N/a | Poland | | Greenland | —N/a | —N/a | 3 |
| March 2022 | Hungary | —N/a | Norway | | San Marino | —N/a | —N/a | 3 |
| June 2022 | Poland | —N/a | Hungary | | Bosnia and Herzegovina | —N/a | Croatia | 5 |
| September 2022 | Belgium | —N/a | Saudi Arabia | | San Marino | —N/a | —N/a | 3 |
| November 2022 | Hungary | —N/a | Latvia | | Greenland | —N/a | —N/a | 3 |
| January 2023 | Hungary | —N/a | Romania | | Bosnia and Herzegovina | —N/a | Greenland | 5 |
| April 2023 | Slovenia | 2–1 | Turkey | | Montenegro | 4–4 (Note: Montenegro won 4–1 on penalties) | Kosovo | 4 |
| June 2023 | Poland | —N/a | Sweden | | San Marino | —N/a | —N/a | 3 |
| September 2023 | Zambia | —N/a | Montenegro | | San Marino | —N/a | —N/a | 3 |
| October 2023 | Morocco | 9–0 | Turkey | | Latvia | 2–2 (Note: Latvia won 4–3 on penalties) | Norway | 4 |
| February 2024 | Denmark | —N/a | San Marino | | Greenland | —N/a | Malta | 5 |
| April 2024 | Italy | —N/a | Venezuela | | Bosnia and Herzegovina | —N/a | Turkey | 4 |
| June 2024 | Poland | 5–4 (Note: This score reflects the penalty shootout after both teams were level on points and goal difference) | Croatia | | —N/a | —N/a | —N/a | 2 |
| Autumn 2024 | Latvia | —N/a | Montenegro | | Slovenia | —N/a | Estonia | 5 |
| November 2024 | Romania | —N/a | Bulgaria | | —N/a | —N/a | —N/a | 2 |
| June 2025 | France | —N/a | Netherlands | | Montenegro | —N/a | Kyrgyzstan | 4 |
| September 2025 | Montenegro | —N/a | San Marino | | Estonia | —N/a | Malta | 4 |
| December 2025 | Poland | 3–1 | Japan | | Saudi Arabia | 3–3 (Note: Saudi Arabia won 4–3 on penalties) | Slovenia | 6 |
| January 2026 | Morocco | 8–2 | Romania | | San Marino | 1–1 (Note: San Marino won 5–4 on penalties) | Turkey | 8 |
| June 2026 | Morocco | —N/a | Serbia | —N/a | Montenegro | —N/a | —N/a | 3 |

=== Men's U-19 national teams ===
| Edition | Champions | Score | Runner-up | Third place | Score | Fourth place | Teams |
|---|---|---|---|---|---|---|---|
| Summer 2018 | Iraq | 3–1 | Croatia | Hungary | 3–2 | Slovenia | 8 |
| Summer 2019 | Slovakia | —N/a | Kosovo | Poland | —N/a | Hungary | 5 |
| Winter 2020 | Turkey | —N/a | France | Slovenia | —N/a | Hungary | 5 |
| Spring 2021 | Spain | 6–0 | France | Ukraine | 1–1 (Note: Ukraine won 5–3 on penalties) | Croatia | 8 |
| Winter 2022 | France | —N/a | Latvia | Slovenia | —N/a | Belgium | 4 |
| Winter 2023 | Hungary | 3–3 (Note: Hungary won 4–3 on penalties) | Belgium | Turkey | 5–2 | Estonia | 6 |
| Summer 2023 | Spain | 7–2 | Morocco | Portugal | 4–0 | Italy | 8 |
| Summer 2024 | Spain | —N/a | Croatia | Italy | —N/a | Poland | 9 |
| Winter 2025 | Romania | —N/a | Montenegro | Malta | —N/a | San Marino | 4 |
| Summer 2025 | Portugal | —N/a | Spain | Italy | —N/a | Ukraine | 9 |

=== Women's national teams ===
==== June Cup ====
Held annually in Poreč, Croatia.

| Year | Dates | Champions | Score | Runners-up | Third place | Score | Fourth place | No. of Teams |
| 2019; Details | 27–30 June | Italy | Round; Robin | Poland | Croatia | Round; Robin | Moldova | 4 |
| 2022; Details | 21–26 June | Poland | Round; Robin | Finland | Sweden | Round; Robin | Hungary | 5 |
| 2023; Details | 13–18 June | Poland | 3–2 | Italy | Sweden | 8–2 | Croatia | 4 |
| 2024; Details | 11–16 June | Italy | 3–2 | Poland | Finland | 4–0 | Croatia | 6 |
| 2025; Details | 18–22 June | Poland | Round; Robin | Czechia | Morocco | Round; Robin | Croatia | 5 |
| 2026; Details | 16–21 June | Italy | 3–1 | Croatia | Poland | 5–0 | Czechia | 8 |

==== February Cup ====
Held in Labin, Croatia.

| Year | Dates | Champions | Score | Runners-up | Third place | Score | Fourth place | No. of Teams |
| 2026; Details | 16–19 February | Spain | Round; Robin | Croatia | Hungary | Round; Robin | Norway | 4 |

=== Men's club teams ===
| Edition | Champions | Score | Runner-up | Third place | Score | Fourth place | Teams |
|---|---|---|---|---|---|---|---|
| 2014 | Qatar A | 5–2 | Futsal Zadar | Qatar B | 6–4 | Remax Brezje Maribor | 6 |
| 2015 | Futsal Dinamo | 5–3 | Futsal Zadar | Bath Futsal | 1–1 (Note: Bath Futsal won 6–5 on penalties) | FC Kemi | 4 |
| 2016 | Futsal Dinamo | —N/a | Futsal Zadar | FC Kemi | —N/a | —N/a | 3 |

=== Men's U-18 club teams ===
| Edition | Champions | Score | Runner-up | Third place | Score | Fourth place | Teams |
|---|---|---|---|---|---|---|---|
| 2013 | Farzandan Mehr | 9–2 | Kijevo | FC Besa | 8–3 | Futsal Zadar | 6 |
| 2016 | Kijevo | 2–2 (Note: Kijevo won 6–5 on penalties) | FC Kemi | Hungary U18 | 8–1 | Stars Selection | 4 |

=== Men's U-17 club teams ===
| Edition | Champions | Score | Runner-up | Third place | Score | Fourth place | Teams |
|---|---|---|---|---|---|---|---|
| 2014 | Kijevo | 3–3 (Note: Kijevo won 5–3 on penalties) | Ilves FS | Futsal Zadar | 8–0 | Bonito | 4 |
| 2015 | FC Kemi | 3–0 | Split Tommy | Futsal Zadar | 3–2 | Kijevo | 4 |
| Summer 2023 (Note: Hybrid tournament contested by clubs and national teams) | Futsal Ribnica | —N/a | Portugal | Croatia Selection | —N/a | Malta | 4 |

=== Men's U-16 club teams ===
| Edition | Champions | Score | Runner-up | Third place | Score | Fourth place | Teams |
|---|---|---|---|---|---|---|---|
| 2013 | Futsal Zadar | 5–2 | Lika-Sport | Kijevo | 2–2 (Note: Kijevo won 2–1 on penalties) | Crnica/SC Mandalina | 6 |

==== 2013 ====
Futsal Week 2013 – U-16 tournament
Tournament details
- Country: Croatia
- City: Zadar
- Venue: Mocire Hall
- Dates: 13 July

Final positions
- Champions: Futsal Zadar (1st title)
- Runners-up: Lika-Sport
- Third place: Kijevo
- Fourth place: Crnica/SC Mandalina

Awards
- Best player: Kristijan Juric (MNK Futsal Zadar)
- Best goalkeeper: Pave Mudronja (MNK Arena)

===== Group stage =====
====== Group A ======
| Pos | Team | Pld | W | D | L | GF | GA | GD | Pts | Qualification |
|---|---|---|---|---|---|---|---|---|---|---|
| 1 | MNK Lika-Sport | 2 | 2 | 0 | 0 | 8 | 3 | +5 | 6 | Final |
| 2 | MNK Crnica/SC Mandalina | 2 | 0 | 1 | 1 | 4 | 6 | −2 | 1 | Third place match |
| 3 | MNK Arena | 2 | 0 | 1 | 1 | 3 | 6 | −3 | 1 | Fifth place match |

Source: Futsal Planet
13 July 2013
10:00

| MNK Lika-Sport | 4–2 | MNK Crnica/SC Mandalina |

Mocire Hall, Zadar, Croatia

13 July 2013
11:30

| MNK Lika-Sport | 4–1 | MNK Arena |

Mocire Hall, Zadar, Croatia

13 July 2013
13:00

| MNK Crnica/SC Mandalina | 2–2 | MNK Arena |

Mocire Hall, Zadar, Croatia

====== Group B ======
| Pos | Team | Pld | W | D | L | GF | GA | GD | Pts | Qualification |
|---|---|---|---|---|---|---|---|---|---|---|
| 1 | MNK Futsal Zadar | 2 | 2 | 0 | 0 | 10 | 4 | +6 | 6 | Final |
| 2 | MNK Kijevo | 2 | 1 | 0 | 1 | 6 | 4 | +2 | 3 | Third place match |
| 3 | MNK Hajduk | 2 | 0 | 0 | 2 | 1 | 9 | −8 | 0 | Fifth place match |

Source: Futsal Planet
13 July 2013
10:45

| MNK Kijevo | 3–4 | MNK Futsal Zadar |

Mocire Hall, Zadar, Croatia

13 July 2013
12:15

| MNK Kijevo | 3–0 | MNK Hajduk |

Mocire Hall, Zadar, Croatia

13 July 2013
13:45

| MNK Futsal Zadar | 6–1 | MNK Hajduk |

Mocire Hall, Zadar, Croatia

===== 5th place match =====
13 July 2013
15:00

| MNK Arena | 5–0 | MNK Hajduk |

Mocire Hall, Zadar, Croatia

===== 3rd place match =====
13 July 2013
15:45

| MNK Crnica/SC Mandalina | 2–2 | MNK Kijevo |
Penalties
| | 1–2 |

Mocire Hall, Zadar, Croatia

===== Final =====
13 July 2013
16:30

| MNK Lika-Sport | 5–2 | MNK Futsal Zadar |
|---|---|---|
| Dunić (?); Fantov (?); Kovač (?) | Report | Petrilić (?); Pocrnić (?) |

Mocire Hall, Zadar, Croatia

=== Women's club teams ===
| Edition | Champions | Score | Runner-up | Third place | Score | Fourth place | Teams |
|---|---|---|---|---|---|---|---|
| 2015 | MC Plus | —N/a | Super Ciks | IPA | —N/a | —N/a | 3 |
| 2016 | MC Plus | —N/a | Futsal Super-Chicks | Mirlovic Zagora | —N/a | —N/a | 3 |

== See also ==
- Futsal Week U-19 Cup
- Thailand Five's Futsal Tournament
- Grand Prix de Futsal
