= Thailand Futsal Cup =

Thailand Five's
- Founded: 2003; 22 years ago
- Region: International
- Number of teams: 4 (2025)
- Current champions: Russia/Japan
- Most successful team(s): Thailand/Thailand
- Television broadcasters: Thairath TV (2016)
- Website: fathailand.org
- 2025 Thailand Five's

The Thailand Five's Futsal Tournament (Thailand International Futsal Cup) is the international championship for futsal, the indoor version of association football organized by Football Association of Thailand or FA Thailand. The Thailand Five's tournament is held every year. The first event was held in 2003.

== Medals (2003-2025) ==
=== Men ===
Rank	Nation	Gold	Silver	Bronze	Total
1	Thailand	7	6	4	17
2	Iran	3	3	2	8
3	Argentina	2	0	1	3
4	Brazil	1	1	0	2
4	Kazakhstan	1	1	0	2
6	Russia	1	0	1	2
7	Czech Republic	1	0	0	1
7	Egypt	1	0	0	1
7	Morocco	1	0	0	1
10	Japan	0	2	1	3
10	Uzbekistan	0	2	1	3
12	Guatemala	0	1	1	2
13	Australia	0	1	0	1
13	Vietnam	0	1	0	1
15	Afghanistan	0	0	2	2
15	England	0	0	2	2
17	Chile	0	0	1	1
17	Kuwait	0	0	1	1
17	Oman	0	0	1	1
Totals (19 entries)		18	18	18	54

=== Women ===
Rank	Nation	Gold	Silver	Bronze	Total
1	Japan	2	0	0	2
2	Thailand	1	1	3	5
3	Vietnam	1	0	0	1
4	China	0	1	0	1
4	Indonesia	0	1	0	1
4	Iran	0	1	0	1
7	Bahrain	0	0	1	1
Totals (7 entries)		4	4	4	12

== Results ==
=== Men ===
#	Year	1st	2nd	3rd	4th	5th	6th	7th	8th	Teams	Ref
1	2003	BRA	JPN	RUS	THA					4	
2	2004	EGY	THA	ENG						3	
3	2008	ARG	THA	JPN	VIE					4	
4	2010	IRI	UZB	ARG	THA					4	
5	2016	KAZ	THA	IRI	JPN					4	
6	2017	ARG	KAZ	THA	MOZ					4	
7	2018	THA	UZB	ENG	MAS					4	
8	2019	THA	VIE	GUA	OMA					4	
9	2020	THA A	THA B	IRI B	TJK	MAS				5	
10	2021-1	IRI	THA	UZB	EGY	TJK	MOZ	LTU	KOS	8	
11	2021-2	THA	BRA B	CHI	OMA					4	
12	2022-1	THA	IRI B	OMA	MYA	MDV	MGL			6	
13	2022-2	MAR	IRI	THA	FIN	VIE	MOZ			6	
14	2023-1	IRI	JPN	THA	KSA	EGY	MOZ			6	
15	2023-2	CZE	THA	AFG	MYA	MOZ	SOL			6	
16	2024-1	THA	AUS	AFG	MAS					4	
17	2024-2	THA	GUA	KUW	AFG	NZL				5	
18	2025-1	RUS	IRI	THA	KUW					4	
19	2025-2									7	

- 2020: Brazill B - Thailand A - Thailand B - Thailand C

=== Women ===
#	Year	1st	2nd	3rd	4th	5th	6th	7th	8th	Teams	Ref
1	2022	THA A	INA	THA B	AUS XI	MYA				5	
2	2023	JPN	THA	BHR	CHN	AUS XI	INA			6	
3	2024	VIE	CHN	THA	TPE	INA				5	
4	2025	JPN	IRI	THA	UZB					4	

== Summary ==
=== Men ===
Rank	Team	Part	M	W	D	L	GF	GA	GD	Points
1	Iran	0	0	0	0	0	0	0	+0	0
2	Japan	0	0	0	0	0	0	0	+0	0
3	Uzbekistan	0	0	0	0	0	0	0	+0	0
4	Thailand	0	0	0	0	0	0	0	+0	0
5	Tajikistan	0	0	0	0	0	0	0	+0	0
6	China	0	0	0	0	0	0	0	+0	0
7	Australia	0	0	0	0	0	0	0	+0	0
8	Vietnam	0	0	0	0	0	0	0	+0	0
9	Indonesia	0	0	0	0	0	0	0	+0	0
10	Kazakhstan	0	0	0	0	0	0	0	+0	0

=== Women ===
Rank	Team	Part	M	W	D	L	GF	GA	GD	Points
1	Japan	0	0	0	0	0	0	0	+0	0
2	Thailand	0	0	0	0	0	0	0	+0	0
3	Vietnam	0	0	0	0	0	0	0	+0	0
4	Malaysia	0	0	0	0	0	0	0	+0	0
5	China	0	0	0	0	0	0	0	+0	0
6	Indonesia	0	0	0	0	0	0	0	+0	0
7	Chinese Taipei	0	0	0	0	0	0	0	+0	0
8	Bahrain	0	0	0	0	0	0	0	+0	0

== See also ==
- Futsal Thai League
- AFC Futsal Asian Cup
- AFC Women's Futsal Asian Cup
- AFF Futsal Championship
- AFF Women's Futsal Championship
- AFC Futsal Club Championship
- AFF Futsal Club Championship
- Futsal Confederations Cup
- Futsal Week
- Futsal Week U-19 Cup
- Thailand national futsal team results and fixtures
- National Sports Development Fund (NSDF)
- Sports Authority of Thailand (SAT)
