= 2024 Futsal Week April Cup =

Tournament details
- Host country: Croatia
- City: Poreč
- Dates: 10 April–14 April
- Teams: 4
- Venue: 2

Final positions
- Champions: Italy (2nd title)
- Runners-up: Venezuela
- Third place: Bosnia and Herzegovina
- Fourth place: Turkey

Tournament statistics
- Top scorer: (Italy) Gabriel Motta Rodrigues
- Best player: (Italy) Carmelo Musumeci
- Best goalkeeper: (Venezuela) Juan Villalobos
- Fair play award: Bosnia and Herzegovina

The 2024 Futsal Week April Cup was an international men's futsal tournament hosted by Futsal Week, and held in Poreč, Croatia from 10 April to 14 April 2024. The tournament was won by Italy.

== Teams ==
Team	Appearance	Previous best performance
Bosnia and Herzegovina	5th	Champions (Winter 2019)
Italy	2nd	Champions (Summer 2021)
Turkey	4th	Runner-up (April 2023, October 2023)
Venezuela	1st	Debut

== Standings ==
Pos	Team	Pld	W	D	L	GF	GA	GD	Pts
1	Italy	3	3	0	0	17	4	+13	9
2	Venezuela	3	2	0	1	14	6	+8	6
3	Bosnia and Herzegovina	3	0	1	2	6	13	−7	1
4	Turkey	3	0	1	2	5	19	−14	1

Source: Futsal Planet
10 April 2024
12:00

Turkey	1–10	Italy

Finida Hall, Poreč, Croatia
10 April 2024
16:00

Bosnia and Herzegovina	1–7	Venezuela

Finida Hall, Poreč, Croatia

12 April 2024
12:00

Venezuela	5–0	Turkey

Finida Hall, Poreč, Croatia
12 April 2024
16:00

Italy	2–1	Bosnia and Herzegovina

Finida Hall, Poreč, Croatia

14 April 2024
12:00

Bosnia and Herzegovina	4–4	Turkey

Zatika Hall, Poreč, Croatia
14 April 2024
16:00

Venezuela	2–5	Italy

Zatika Hall, Poreč, Croatia
