= 2026 Futsal Week Women's February Cup =

Tournament details
- Host country: Croatia
- City: Labin
- Dates: 16–19 February
- Teams: 4
- Venue: Franko Mileta Hall

Final positions
- Champions: Spain
- Runners-up: Croatia
- Third place: Hungary
- Fourth place: Norway

Tournament statistics
- Top scorer: Laura Uña (Spain)
- Best player: Irene Samper (Spain)
- Best goalkeeper: Ari (Spain)
- Fair play award: Norway

The 2026 Futsal Week Women's February Cup was an international women's futsal tournament hosted by Futsal Week, and held in Labin, Croatia from 16 to 19 February 2026. Spain won the tournament.

== Teams ==
| Team | Appearance | Previous best performance |
|---|---|---|
| Croatia | 1st | Debut |
| Hungary | 1st | Debut |
| Norway | 1st | Debut |
| Spain | 1st | Debut |

== Standings ==
| Pos | Team | Pld | W | D | L | GF | GA | GD | Pts |
|---|---|---|---|---|---|---|---|---|---|
| 1 | Spain (C) | 2 | 2 | 0 | 0 | 13 | 0 | +13 | 6 |
| 2 | Croatia | 3 | 2 | 0 | 1 | 4 | 9 | −5 | 6 |
| 3 | Hungary | 2 | 0 | 1 | 1 | 0 | 2 | −2 | 1 |
| 4 | Norway | 3 | 0 | 1 | 2 | 1 | 7 | −6 | 1 |

Source: Futsal Planet
(C) Champions
16 February 2025
18:15

| Spain | 5–0 | Norway |
|---|---|---|
| Laura Uña 12', 35', 35'; Patricia Ortega 16'; Paula Guix 26' | Report |

Franko Mileta Hall, Labin, Croatia
Referee: Marijana Orešić (CRO)
Nina Nakić (CRO)
17 February 2025
18:15

| Croatia | 2–0 | Hungary |
|---|---|---|
| Nika Petarić 8'; Anikó Nagy 19' (o.g.) | Report |

Franko Mileta Hall, Labin, Croatia

18 February 2025
16:00

| Norway | 0–0 | Hungary |
|---|---|---|
| | Report |

Franko Mileta Hall, Labin, Croatia
18 February 2025
18:15

| Croatia | 0–8 | Spain |
|---|---|---|
| | Report | Élia Gulli 5'; Claudia López 12'; Laura Sánchez 14'; Patricia Ortega 19', 25', 25'; Laura Uña 36'; Paula Guix 39' |

Franko Mileta Hall, Labin, Croatia
Referee: Marijana Orešić (CRO)
Lidia Crespo (ESP)

19 February 2025
16:00

| Croatia | 2–1 | Norway |
|---|---|---|
| Jelena Matanić 5'; Marija Žagar 20' | Report | Una Borgen 11' |

Franko Mileta Hall, Labin, Croatia
