= Hüseyin Yıldız (footballer) =

Turkish-Belgian futsal player

Hüseyin Yıldız (also known as Husseyin Yildiz in Belgium) (born April 27, 1979) is a Turkish-Belgian futsal player. He currently plays for Paraske Bowl Morlanwelz and previously played for Brussels United, GDL Chatelet and Diables Carolo.

He is a member of the Turkey national futsal team in the UEFA Futsal Championship.
