= 2024 Futsal Week November Cup =

Tournament details
- Host country: Croatia
- City: Poreč
- Dates: 3–4 November
- Teams: 2
- Venue: Finida Hall

Final positions
- Champions: Romania (1st title)
- Runners-up: Bulgaria

Tournament statistics
- Top scorer: (Romania) Vladut Dudau (4 goals)
- Best player: (Romania) Andrei Craciun
- Best goalkeeper: (Romania) Petrisor Tonita

The 2024 Futsal Week November Cup, also known as the 2024 Futsal Week November Challenge, was an international men's futsal tournament, organized by Futsal Week, and held in Poreč, Croatia from 3 to 4 November 2024. The tournament was won by Romania.

== Teams ==
Team	Appearance	Previous best performance
Romania	3rd	Champions (Autumn 2024)
Bulgaria	2nd	Runner-up (Autumn 2024)

== Standings ==
Pos	Team	Pld	W	D	L	GF	GA	GD	Pts
1	Romania (C)	2	2	0	0	15	1	+14	6
2	Bulgaria	2	0	0	2	1	15	−14	0

Source: Futsal Planet
(C) Champions
3 November 2024
16:00

Bulgaria	1–8	Romania
	Report	István Hadnagy; Andor Bálint; Vlad Dudău; Sergiu Gavrilă; Andrei Crăciun

Finida Hall, Poreč, Croatia

4 November 2024
16:00

Romania	7–0	Bulgaria
Vlad Dudău; Miklós Tamás; Richárd Iszlai; István Hadnagy	Report

Finida Hall, Poreč, Croatia
