= Turkey national futsal team =

Turkey
- Nickname(s): Ay-Yıldızlılar ("Crescent-Stars")
- Association: Turkish Football Federation
- Confederation: UEFA (Europe)
- Head coach: (Turkey) Murat Kaya
- Most caps: Hüseyin Yıldız (14)
- Home stadium: Abdi İpekçi Arena & Sinan Erdem Dome
- FIFA code: TUR
- FIFA ranking: 109 (24 September 2026)
Home colours	Away colours

First international
- Romania 7–3 Turkey (Bucharest, Romania; 13 December 2006)

Biggest win
- Turkey 13–1 Gibraltar (Krosno, Poland; 19 November 2013)

Biggest defeat
- Brazil 14–2 Turkey (Debrecen, Hungary; 15 November 2007)

FIFA World Cup
- Appearances: 0

UEFA Futsal Championship
- Appearances: 1 (First in 2012)
- Best result: 1st round (2012)

The Turkey national futsal team represents Turkey in international futsal competitions such as the FIFA Futsal World Cup and the European Championships and is controlled by the Turkish Football Federation, which founded the national team in 2006. Ömer Kaner was the first head coach, Ümit Davala the first captain and Murat Düzgün was the first goal scorer.

== Tournament records ==
=== FIFA Futsal World Cup ===
FIFA Futsal World Cup record										Qualification record						
Year	Round	Position	Pld	W	D	L	GF	GA	Squad	Outcome	Pld	W	D	L	GF	GA
(Netherlands) 1989	Did not enter									Did not enter						
(Hong Kong) 1992	Did not enter									Did not enter						
(Spain) 1996	Did not enter									Did not enter						
(Guatemala) 2000	Did not enter									Did not enter						
(Taiwan) 2004	Did not enter									Did not enter						
(Brazil) 2008	Did not qualify									Group 9 3rd place	3	1	0	2	7	9
(Thailand) 2012	Did not qualify									Group 6 4th place	6	3	0	3	21	19
(Colombia) 2016	Did not qualify									Group 3 4th place	3	0	0	3	3	21
(Lithuania) 2021	Did not qualify									Group F 3rd place	3	1	0	2	8	13
(Uzbekistan) 2024	Did not qualify									Group D 3rd place	3	1	0	2	9	10
2028	Did not qualify									Group C 3rd place	3	1	1	1	14	13
Total	—	0/11	0	0	0	0	0	0	—	6/10	21	7	1	13	62	85

=== UEFA European Futsal Championship ===
UEFA European Futsal Championship Record								Qualification Record					
Year	Round	M	W	D	L	GF	GA	M	W	D	L	GF	GA
Spain 1996	Did not enter							Did not enter					
Spain 1999	Did not enter							Did not enter					
Russia 2001	Did not enter							Did not enter					
Italy 2003	Did not enter							Did not enter					
Czech Republic 2005	Did not enter							Did not enter					
Portugal 2007	Did not enter							Did not enter					
Hungary 2010	Did not qualify							3	0	1	2	2	7
Croatia 2012	Round 1	2	0	0	2	1	8	6	4	0	2	19	22
Belgium 2014	Did not qualify							3	1	0	2	9	12
Serbia 2016	Did not qualify							3	1	0	2	8	18
Slovenia 2018	Did not qualify							3	0	0	3	2	17
Netherlands 2022	Did not qualify							5	1	2	2	10	12
Latvia/Lithuania/Slovenia 2026	Did not qualify							6	0	0	6	11	34
Total	1/13	2	0	0	2	1	8	29	7	3	19	61	118

=== Minor tournament ===
this table consist of only senior A team Results (not include Youth and club match results)

Three/Four Nations Cup Record
Year	Round	Pld	W	D	L	GS	GA	Dif	Pts
(Turkey) 2007 Izmir Cup	Third place	3	1	1	1	12	10	+2	4
(Hungary) 2007 Fonix Cup	Fourth place	3	0	0	3	10	25	-15	0
(Poland) 2008 Rzeszów Cup	Fourth place	3	0	1	2	3	13	-10	0
(Romania) 2008 Buzau Cup	Third place	2	1	0	1	4	8	-4	3
(Azerbaijan) 2009 Baku Cup	Runners-up	2	1	0	1	9	6	+3	3
(England) 2010 Hereford Cup	Champions	2	2	0	0	7	5	+2	6
(Libya) 2010 Mediterranean Cup	9th place	6	3	1	2	32	26	+6	10
(Azerbaijan) 2012 Baku Cup	Third place	3	0	2	1	3	7	-4	2
(Poland) 2013 Krosno Cup	Third place	3	1	0	2	15	10	+5	3
(North Macedonia) 2014 Skopje Cup	Third place	2	0	1	1	2	12	-10	1
(Croatia) 2016 Futsal Week Cup	Third place	4	0	0	4	1	13	-12	0
(Greece) 2016 Chalkida Cup	Champions	2	1	1	0	3	2	+1	4
Total	12/12	35	10	7	18	101	127	-26	37

=== Futsal Week ===
- Futsal Week
- Futsal Week U-19 Cup
- FutsalFeed Best Team Awards

== Results Summary ==
- As a 15 Nov 2016

Tournament	M	W	D	L	GF	GA	GD
FIFA World Cup Record	0	0	0	0	0	0	0
FIFA World Cup Qualification Record	12	4	0	8	31	49	-13
European Championship Record	2	0	0	2	1	8	-7
European Championship Qualification Record	21	8	2	11	61	86	-25
Minor Tournament Record	35	10	7	18	101	127	-26
Friendly Match Record	54	12	7	35	142	227	-85
Total	124	34	16	74	336	497	-161

- one match not recorded on Fut5al Planet (TUR 1-1 FIN 2014 - Turkey win 3–1 in penalty - in total 4–2)
  Source:Fut5al Planet

== Results ==
=== FIFA Futsal World Cup Qualification ===
Number	Year	Opponent	Result
2008 FIFA Futsal World Cup qualification (UEFA)
1	2006	Slovakia	2-4
2	2006	Latvia	3-2
3	2006	Portugal	2-3
2012 FIFA Futsal World Cup qualification (UEFA)
4	2011	Estonia	4-3
5	2011	Finland	6-0
6	2011	Albania	5-2
7	2011	Belarus	1-7
8	2011	Czech Republic	2-3
9	2011	Netherlands	3-4
2016 FIFA Futsal World Cup qualification (UEFA)
10	2015	Serbia	0-6
11	2015	Finland	2-8
12	2015	Russia	1-7
2020 FIFA Futsal World Cup qualification (UEFA)
13	2019	Scotland	4-3
14	2019	Switzerland	2-3
15	2019	Bosnia and Herzegovina	2-7
2024 FIFA Futsal World Cup qualification (UEFA)
16	2022	Lithuania	1-4
17	2022	Northern Ireland	7-4
18	2022	Israel	1-2
2028 FIFA Futsal World Cup qualification (UEFA)
19	2026	Lithuania	4-4
20	2026	North Macedonia	3-6
21	2026	Bulgaria	7-3

=== UEFA European Futsal Championship Qualification ===
Number	Year	Opponent	Result
2010 UEFA Futsal Championship qualifying
1	2009	Israel	1-1
2	2009	Finland	0-2
3	2009	Montenegro	1-4
UEFA Futsal Euro 2012 qualifying
4	2011	Montenegro	5-1
5	2011	Switzerland	2-3
6	2011	Moldova	4-2
7	2011	Hungary	3-2
8	2011	Ukraine	2-12
9	2011	Belgium	3-2
UEFA Futsal Euro 2014 qualifying
10	2013	Slovenia	3-5
11	2013	England	4-3
12	2013	Ukraine	2-4
UEFA Futsal Euro 2016 qualifying
13	2015	Croatia	0-10
14	2015	Slovakia	1-5
15	2015	Armenia	7-3
UEFA Futsal Euro 2018 qualifying
16	2017	Slovakia	1-8
17	2017	France	1-5
18	2017	Russia	0-4
UEFA Futsal Euro 2022 qualifying
19	2020	Lithuania	2-3
20	2020	Hungary	0-3
21	2020	Northern Ireland	4-2
22	2020	Greece	3-3
23	2020	Greece	1-1
UEFA Futsal Euro 2026 qualifying
24	2024	Poland	1-4
25	2025	Moldova	3-4
26	2025	Slovakia	2-7
27	2025	Slovakia	4-8
28	2025	Poland	0-6
29	2025	Moldova	1-5

=== UEFA European Futsal Championship ===
Number	Year	Opponent	Result
UEFA Futsal Euro 2012
1	2012	Italy	1-3
2	2012	Russia	0-5

== Players ==
=== Current squad ===
The following players were called up to the squad for the 2028 FIFA Futsal World Cup qualifying matches against Lithuania, North Macedonia and Bulgaria on 9, 10 and 12 April 2026 respectively.

No.	Pos.	Player	Date of birth (age)	Caps	Goals	Club
1	GK	Alpay Yüzgeç	19 November 1997 (age 28)			(Royal Dutch Football Association) Heracles Almelo
12	GK	Yusuf Sözübek	14 March 2005 (age 21)			(French Football Federation) Kingersheim Futsal
2	DF	Yusuf Aygün	12 May 2000 (age 26)			(Turkish Football Federation) Sakarya Karasu 1933
4	DF	Burak Uğurlu	20 July 1994 (age 32)			(Turkish Football Federation) Sakarya Karasu 1933
5	DF	Ahmet Köse	5 July 2008 (age 18)			(Turkish Football Federation) Fenerbahçe
6	DF	Ahmet Bolat	17 May 2008 (age 18)			(Turkish Football Federation) Adana Demirspor
8	DF	Hakan Hasan Bülbül	30 April 2004 (age 22)			(French Football Federation) Artistes Futsal
14	DF	Umur Ağır	9 March 1996 (age 30)			(Royal Dutch Football Association) ZVV Eindhoven
3	FW	Gökdeniz Kahveci	19 June 2003 (age 23)			(Royal Dutch Football Association) VV Goes
7	FW	Salih Öndüç	22 August 2002 (age 24)			(Turkish Football Federation) Battalgazi Belediyesi
9	FW	Kahan Özcan (captain)	25 November 1991 (age 34)			(Royal Dutch Football Association) FC Bordeauxboys
10	FW	Ali Kaya	1 December 1988 (age 37)			(French Football Federation) La Cuatro Futsal
11	FW	Cemil Avcı	17 January 1991 (age 35)			(French Football Federation) AS Saint-Priest
13	FW	Mustafa Papatya	22 August 2002 (age 24)			(Turkish Football Federation) Seyrantepe İdman Yurdu

=== Recent call-ups ===
The following players have also been called up to the squad within the last 12 months.

Pos.	Player	Date of birth (age)	Caps	Goals	Club	Latest call-up
GK	Hulusi Ceylan	20 November 2008 (age 17)			(Turkey) Fenerbahçe	v. Lithuania, 9 April 2026^{PRE}
GK	Deniz Roofthoofd	23 February 2008 (age 18)			(Belgium) Full Hasselt	v. San Marino, 25 January 2026
DF	Mücahid Ceylan	13 September 1991 (age 35)			(Belgium) FAL Soumagne	v. San Marino, 25 January 2026
DF	Hasan Ekmen	28 November 1997 (age 28)			(Turkey) Seyrantepe İdman Yurdu	v. San Marino, 25 January 2026
DF	Kamil Can Akparlak	9 September 1994 (age 32)			(Turkey) Ölüdeniz SK	v. San Marino, 25 January 2026
DF	Faruk Yanık	10 March 2001 (age 25)			(Turkey) Sakarya Karasu 1933	v. Albania, 18 December 2025
FW	Hıdır Can Aslaner				(Sweden) GAIS Futsal	v. San Marino, 25 January 2026
FW	Erdem Kuş	20 October 2003 (age 23)			(Belgium) FAL Soumagne	v. Albania, 18 December 2025
FW	Adem Küçükkartal	15 October 1991 (age 35)			(Denmark) Albertslund IF	v. Albania, 18 December 2025
^{INJ} Player withdrew from the squad due to an injury.^{PRE} Preliminary squad.^{RET} Retired from international futsal.

== Notable players ==
- Erol Bulut
- Ümit Davala
- Tayfun Korkut

== See also ==
- Turkey national football team
- Turkey women's national football team
- Turkey national youth football team
- Turkey national under-21 football team
