= Futsal Week U-19 Cup =

- Organising body: Futsal Week
- Founded: 2018; 7 years ago
- Current champions: Spain (3rd title)
- Most successful team(s): Spain (3 titles)
- Website: futsalweek.com

The Futsal Week U-19 Cup is an international youth futsal tournament organized by Futsal Week. The first edition of the tournament was held in 2018.

== Tournament summaries ==
=== Summer 2023 ===
The 2023 Futsal Week U-19 Summer Cup was an international men's under-19 futsal tournament, organized by Futsal Week, and held in Poreč, Croatia from 20 June to 25 June 2023.

=== Summer 2024 ===
2024 Futsal Week U-19 Summer Cup
Tournament details
- Host country: Croatia
- City: Poreč
- Dates: 18 June–24 June
- Teams: 9
- Venue(s): Finida Hall

Final positions
- Champions: Spain
- Runners-up: Croatia
- Third place: Italy
- Fourth place: Poland

Tournament statistics
- Top scorer(s): (Spain) Daniel Martinez
- Best player(s): (Spain) Daniel Martinez
- Best goalkeeper: (Spain) Javier Fernandez

The 2024 Futsal Week U-19 Summer Cup was an international men's under-19 futsal tournament, organized by Futsal Week, and held in Poreč, Croatia from 18 June to 24 June 2024. It was one of three competitions to be held in the month of June, alongside the 2024 Futsal Week Women's June Cup and the 2024 Futsal Week June Cup. Originally, 12 teams had entered the competition, but three withdrew prior to the tournament. The defending champions are Spain.

The tournament was used as preparation for the 2025 UEFA Under-19 Futsal Championship for multiple teams, including Poland, Germany, and Spain.

==== Format ====
Nine teams competed in the first stage, and based on the finishing standings of those groups, a further three groups were played to determine finishing positions.

==== First stage ====
===== Group A =====
Pos	Team	Pld	W	D	L	GF	GA	GD	Pts	Qualification
1	Italy	2	2	0	0	9	4	+5	6	Group 1-3
2	Poland	2	0	1	1	4	5	−1	1	Group 4-6
3	Germany	2	0	1	1	6	10	−4	1	Group 7-9

Source: Futsal Planet
18 June 2024
11:00

Poland	3–3	Germany
Górkiewicz 1'; Haraburda 7'; Łapigrowski 36'	Report (PFA); Report (DFB)	Bednarski 5' (o.g.); Altay 18'; Xydias 19'

Finida Hall, Poreč, Croatia
Referee: Aleš Peric (Slovenia)

19 June 2024
11:00

Italy	2–1	Poland
Modesto 17'; Mendes 18'	Report (PFA); Report (DFB)	Pawlus 18'

Finida Hall, Poreč, Croatia
Referee: Nikola Jelić (Croatia)

20 June 2024
11:00

Germany	3–7	Italy
Konrad 9'; Melissopoulos 18'; Berretta 36'	Report	Ceccarelli 11'; Modesto 14', 17'; Cutruneo 19'; de Gois 26', 33'; Berretta 27' (o.g.)

Finida Hall, Poreč, Croatia
Referee: Daniel Matkovic (Switzerland)

===== Group B =====
Pos	Team	Pld	W	D	L	GF	GA	GD	Pts	Qualification
1	Spain	2	2	0	0	7	0	+7	6	Group 1-3
2	Ukraine	2	1	0	1	4	6	−2	3	Group 4-6
3	Finland	2	0	0	2	1	6	−5	0	Group 7-9

Source: Futsal Planet
18 June 2024
16:00

Ukraine	4–1	Finland
Daniil 7'; Ivan 21'; Vladyslav 33'; Artem 39'	Report (FAF); Report (DFB)	Daniel 38'

Finida Hall, Poreč, Croatia

19 June 2024
16:00

Spain	5–0	Ukraine
Hernández 20'; Altaba 29'; Ruano 30'; Martínez 32'; Sánchez 38'	Report (RFEF); Report (DFB)

Finida Hall, Poreč, Croatia

20 June 2024
16:00

Finland	0–2	Spain
	Report (RFEF); Report (DFB)	Ruano 19' (pen.); García 32'

Finida Hall, Poreč, Croatia

===== Group C =====
Pos	Team	Pld	W	D	L	GF	GA	GD	Pts	Qualification
1	Croatia	2	2	0	0	5	2	+3	6	Group 1-3
2	Serbia	2	1	0	1	4	4	0	3	Group 4-6
3	Czech Republic	2	0	0	2	1	4	−3	0	Group 7-9

Source: Futsal Planet
18 June 2024
18:15

Croatia	2–0	Czech Republic
	Report (FACR); Report (DFB)

Finida Hall, Poreč, Croatia

19 June 2024
18:15

Serbia	2–3	Croatia
	Report

Finida Hall, Poreč, Croatia

20 June 2024
18:15

Czech Republic	1–2	Serbia
Filip 25'	Report (FACR); Report (DFB)

Finida Hall, Poreč, Croatia

==== Second stage ====
===== Group 1-3 =====
Pos	Team	Pld	W	D	L	GF	GA	GD	Pts
1	Spain	2	2	0	0	8	4	+4	6
2	Croatia	2	1	0	1	9	10	−1	3
3	Italy	2	0	0	2	6	9	−3	0

Source: Futsal Planet
21 June 2024
18:15

Croatia	6–5	Italy
	Report

Finida Hall, Poreč, Croatia

22 June 2024
18:15

Spain	5–3	Croatia
Ruano 8', 15', 39'; González 16'; Perusko 40'	Report	Posavec 12'; Parlov 29'; Kusakovic 34'

Finida Hall, Poreč, Croatia

23 June 2024
18:15

Italy	1–3	Spain
Grosso 15'	Report	González 14'; Ruano 17', 23'

Finida Hall, Poreč, Croatia

===== Group 4-6 =====
Pos	Team	Pld	W	D	L	GF	GA	GD	Pts
1	Poland	2	2	0	0	6	2	+4	6
2	Ukraine	2	1	0	1	4	3	+1	3
3	Serbia	2	0	0	2	2	7	−5	0

Source: Futsal Planet
21 June 2024
13:00

Ukraine	1–2	Poland
Prykhodko 22'	Report	Kuźma 34'; Pawlus 40'

Finida Hall, Poreč, Croatia
Referee: Nikola Jelić (Croatia

22 June 2024
11:00

Serbia	1–3	Ukraine
	Report

Finida Hall, Poreč, Croatia

23 June 2024
11:00

Poland	4–1	Serbia
Kuźma 6', 23'; Sowa 33'; Sławkowski 37'	Report	Dimitrijević 1'

Finida Hall, Poreč, Croatia

===== Group 7-9 =====
Pos	Team	Pld	W	D	L	GF	GA	GD	Pts
1	Czech Republic	2	1	1	0	7	6	+1	4
2	Germany	2	1	0	1	8	7	+1	3
3	Finland	2	0	1	1	6	8	−2	1

Source: Futsal Planet
21 June 2024
16:00

Germany	5–3	Finland
Melissopoulos 3', 35'; Inderwisch 20'; Smith 21', 26'	Report	Barwani 23'; Mehinen 31'; Barazza 32'

Finida Hall, Poreč, Croatia
Referee: Pawel Tokarewicz (Poland)

22 June 2024
16:00

Czech Republic	4–3	Germany
Winter 15'; Lemon 17', 22'; Resetar 28'	Report	Inderwisch 19', 31'; Rabiega 28'

Finida Hall, Poreč, Croatia
Referee: Nikola Jelić (Croatia)

23 June 2024
16:00

Finland	3–3	Czech Republic
	Report

Finida Hall, Poreč, Croatia

==== Ranking ====
Rank	Team
1st place, gold medalist(s)	Spain
2nd place, silver medalist(s)	Croatia
3rd place, bronze medalist(s)	Italy
4	Poland
5	Ukraine
6	Serbia
7	Czech Republic
8	Germany
9	Finland

==== Broadcasting ====
All matches were broadcast on the official Futsal Week Facebook page.

=== Winter 2025 ===
==== Standings ====
Pos	Team	Pld	W	D	L	GF	GA	GD	Pts
1	Romania	3	2	1	0	16	4	+12	7
2	Montenegro	3	2	1	0	12	2	+10	7
3	Malta	3	1	0	2	4	17	−13	3
4	San Marino	3	0	0	3	2	11	−9	0

Source: Futsal Planet
