= 2024 Futsal Week Autumn Cup =

Tournament details
- Host country: Croatia
- City: Poreč
- Dates: 22 September–26 September
- Teams: 5
- Venue: Intersport Hall

Final positions
- Champions: Latvia (1st title)
- Runners-up: Montenegro
- Third place: Slovenia
- Fourth place: Estonia

Tournament statistics
- Top scorer: (Latvia) Andzejs Mickevics
- Best player: (Latvia) Artjoms Kozlovskis
- Best goalkeeper: (Montenegro) Balsa Djurkovic
- Fair play award: Latvia

The 2024 Futsal Week Autumn Cup was an international men's futsal tournament hosted by Futsal Week, and held in Poreč, Croatia from 22 September to 26 September 2024. The tournament was won by Latvia.

== Teams ==
Team	Appearance	Previous best performance
Estonia	3rd	Fifth place (January 2023)
Latvia	2nd	Third place (October 2023)
Montenegro	11th	Champions (Spring 2019)
Slovenia	4th	Champions (Winter 2 2017, April 2023)
Turkey	5th	Runner-up (April 2023, October 2023)

== Standings ==
Pos	Team	Pld	W	D	L	GF	GA	GD	Pts
1	Latvia	4	3	1	0	19	7	+12	10
2	Montenegro	4	2	2	0	13	7	+6	8
3	Slovenia	4	2	1	1	11	6	+5	7
4	Estonia	4	1	0	3	7	19	−12	3
5	Turkey	4	0	0	4	9	20	−11	0

Source: Futsal Planet
22 September 2024
16:00

Turkey	2–5	Montenegro

Intersport Hall, Poreč, Croatia
22 September 2024
18:15

Slovenia	2–0	Estonia
Turk 10'; Čoop 37'	Report

Intersport Hall, Poreč, Croatia

23 September 2024
16:00

Montenegro	2–2	Slovenia
9' Nemanja; 33' Blasa	Report	17' Teo Turk; 30' Fideršek

Intersport Hall, Poreč, Croatia
23 September 2024
18:15

Latvia	5–4	Turkey
Baklanovs 2'; Kozlovskis 5'; Ozkul 21' (o.g.); Troickis 25'; Mickēvičs 26'	Report	Kucukkartal 4'; Bildirici 5'; Kahveci 10', 37'

Intersport Hall, Poreč, Croatia

24 September 2024
16:00

Slovenia	1–4	Latvia
Turk 32'	Report	Baklanovs 9'; Kozlovskis 25'; Fogels 29'; Mickēvičs 38'

Intersport Hall, Poreč, Croatia
24 September 2024
18:15

Estonia	2–5	Montenegro
Pauletic 28' (o.g.); Vnukov 28'	Report	Kostic 6'; Tafic 11', 27', 34'; Delic 11'

Intersport Hall, Poreč, Croatia
Referee: Danijele D. Adamo (San Marino)

25 September 2024
16:00

Turkey	0–6	Slovenia
	Report	Bukovec 2', 21', 35'; Čop 7', 34'; Kneževič 26'

Intersport Hall, Poreč, Croatia
25 September 2024
18:15

Latvia	9–1	Estonia
Mickēvičs 2', 30'; Piļipčuks 14', 39'; Kozlovskis 22'; Strazdiņš 26'; Üdris 28', 36'; Fogels 38'	Report (EFA); Report (LFF)	Matinaro 9'

Intersport Hall, Poreč, Croatia

26 September 2024
16:00

Montenegro	1–1	Latvia
Nikolič 1'	Report	Krūmiņš 9'

Intersport Hall, Poreč, Croatia
26 September 2024
18:15

Estonia	4–3	Turkey
Vnukov 1', 32'; Vassiljev 8'; Bažkov 24'	Report	Kucukkartal 23'; Ceylan 24'; Altunay 38'

Intersport Hall, Poreč, Croatia
