= 2024 Futsal Week June Cup =

Tournament details
- Host country: Croatia
- City: Poreč
- Dates: 11 June–13 June
- Teams: 2
- Venue: Finida Hall

Final positions
- Champions: Poland (3rd title)
- Runners-up: Croatia

Tournament statistics
- Top scorer: (Czech Republic) Michal Holy
- Best player: (Poland) Mikolaj Zastawnik
- Best goalkeeper: (Poland) Krzysztof Iwanek

The 2024 Futsal Week June Cup was an international men's futsal tournament, organized by Futsal Week, and held in Poreč, Croatia from 11 June to 13 June 2024. Despite the initial estimate of three teams entering the competition, it was confirmed that only two would enter. The tournament was held alongside the 2024 Futsal Week Women's June Cup.

== Teams ==
Team	Appearance	Previous best performance
Croatia	2nd	Fourth place (June 2022)
Poland	4th	Champions (June 2022, June 2023)

== Matches ==
11 June 2024
18:15

Poland	2–3	Czech Republic
Dzienis 11'; Maur 23' (o.g.)	Report	Drozd 13'; Holý 26'; Havlín 39' (pen.)

Finida Hall, Poreč, Croatia
Referee: Mateu Šimonov (Croatia)

13 June 2024
18:15

Czech Republic	3–4	Poland
Křivánek 2'; Drozd 11'; Holý 24'	Report	Siecla 10'; Zastawnik 21', 31'; Raszkowski 30'
Penalties
Havlín (penalty scored); Ťok (penalty missed); Drozd (penalty scored); Vnuk (penalty scored); Křivánek (penalty scored)	4–5	Zastawnik (penalty scored); Jankowski (penalty scored); Siecla (penalty scored); Kubik (penalty scored); Raszkowski (penalty scored)

Finida Hall, Poreč, Croatia
