= Montenegro national futsal team =

Montenegro
- Nickname(s): Hrabri Orlovi (Brave Eagles)
- Association: Football Association of Montenegro
- Confederation: UEFA (Europe)
- Head coach: Montenegro Sveto Ljesar
- Captain: Nikola Perović
- FIFA code: MNE
- FIFA ranking: 74 ▼13 (24 September 2026)
Home colours	Away colours

First international
- Montenegro 3–2 Albania (Montenegro; 13 January 2007)

Biggest win
- San Marino 0–13 Montenegro (Serravalle, San Marino; 11 December 2010)

Biggest defeat
- Serbia 8–1 Montenegro (Belgrade, Serbia; 14 March 2009)

FIFA World Cup
- Appearances: 0

European Championship
- Appearances: 0

The Montenegro national futsal team is controlled by the Football Association of Montenegro, the governing body for futsal in Montenegro and represents the country in international futsal competitions, such as the World Cup and the European Championships. The head coach of Monetenegro national futsal team is Sveto Ljesar.

== Competition history ==
=== FIFA Futsal World Cup ===
- 2008 – did not qualify
- 2012 – did not qualify
- 2016 – did not qualify
- 2021 - did not qualify
- 2024 - did not qualify

=== UEFA Futsal Championship ===
- Portugal 2007 - did not qualify
- Hungary 2010 - did not qualify
- Croatia 2012 - did not qualify
- Belgium 2014 - did not qualify
- Serbia 2016 - did not qualify
- Slovenia 2018 - did not qualify
- Netherlands 2022 - did not qualify
- Latvia/Lithuania/Slovenia 2026 - did not qualify

== Players ==
=== Current squad ===
The following players were called up to the squad for the 2028 FIFA Futsal World Cup qualifying matches against Austria, Gibraltar and Kosovo on 9, 10 and 12 April 2026 respectively.

No.	Pos.	Player	Date of birth (age)	Caps	Goals	Club
1	GK	Balša Đurković	18 May 1993 (age 33)			(Football Association of Montenegro) KMF Bajo Pivljanin
12	GK	Milun Sekulić	16 July 1992 (age 34)			(Football Association of Montenegro) KMF Titograd
20	GK	Irhad Popović	23 June 2002 (age 24)			(Football Association of Montenegro) KMF Titograd
2	DF	Balša Bojanović	1 October 2002 (age 24)			(Football Association of Montenegro) KMF Titograd
3	DF	Nermin Krumic	20 November 1998 (age 27)			(Football Association of Montenegro) FK Ulcinj-Ulqini
6	DF	Goran Delić (captain)	29 October 1997 (age 28)			(Football Association of Montenegro) KMF Titograd
7	DF	Filip Marković	24 July 1994 (age 32)			(Football Association of Montenegro) KMF Studentski dom
11	DF	David Puletić	15 June 2002 (age 24)			(Hungarian Football Federation) PTE-PEAC
16	DF	Marko Spasojević	3 July 1988 (age 38)			(Football Association of Montenegro) KMF Titograd
4	FW	Janko Bulatović	12 December 2001 (age 24)			(Football Association of Montenegro) KMF Titograd
5	FW	Nemanja Nikolić	18 May 1997 (age 29)			(Football Association of Montenegro) KMF Titograd
8	FW	Pavle Vukčević	14 October 2002 (age 23)			(Football Association of Montenegro) KMF Titograd
9	FW	Luka Vuletić	5 December 1992 (age 33)			(Slovak Football Association) FK Lučenec
10	FW	Ilija Mugoša	20 July 1988 (age 38)			(Football Association of Montenegro) KMF Bajo Pivljanin

=== Recent call-ups ===
The following players have also been called up to the squad within the last 12 months.

Pos.	Player	Date of birth (age)	Caps	Goals	Club	Latest call-up
GK	Elvir Popović	10 October 1996 (age 30)			(Montenegro) FK Dolcinium	v. Moldova, 12 March 2026
GK	Nemanja Krunić	14 May 2004 (age 22)			(Montenegro) KMF Bajo Pivljanin	v. Cyprus, 29 January 2026
DF	Vuk Pandurica	23 January 2008 (age 18)			(Montenegro) KMF Brskovo	v. Moldova, 12 March 2026
DF	Luka Gopčević	16 September 2004 (age 22)			(Montenegro) KMF Cattaro 2019	v. Moldova, 12 March 2026
DF	Darko Rajković	17 November 1997 (age 28)			(Montenegro) KMF Studentski dom	v. Moldova, 12 March 2026
DF	Danilo Babović	3 January 2001 (age 25)			(Montenegro) KMF Bajo Pivljanin	v. Cyprus, 29 January 2026
FW	Enis Barjaktarović	3 November 2006 (age 19)			(Montenegro) FK Ulcinj-Ulqini	v. Moldova, 12 March 2026
FW	Bojan Vlaović	6 February 2000 (age 26)			(Montenegro) KMF Studentski dom	v. Moldova, 12 March 2026
FW	Nikola Vidaković	19 July 1994 (age 32)			(Montenegro) KMF Studentski dom	v. Cyprus, 29 January 2026
^{INJ} Player withdrew from the squad due to an injury.^{PRE} Preliminary squad.^{RET} Retired from international futsal.

== See also ==
- Montenegrin Futsal First League
