= Lielvārde Municipality =

Municipality of Latvia

Coordinates: 56°43′21″N 24°48′18″E

Lielvārde Municipality Lielvārdes novads
- Municipality
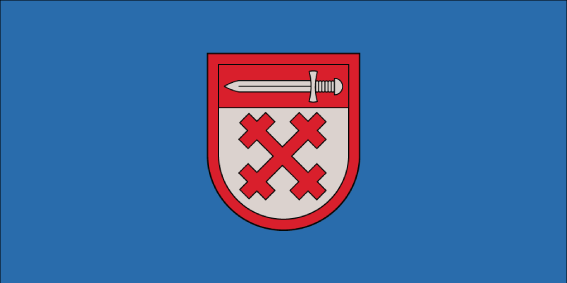
- Flag Coat of arms

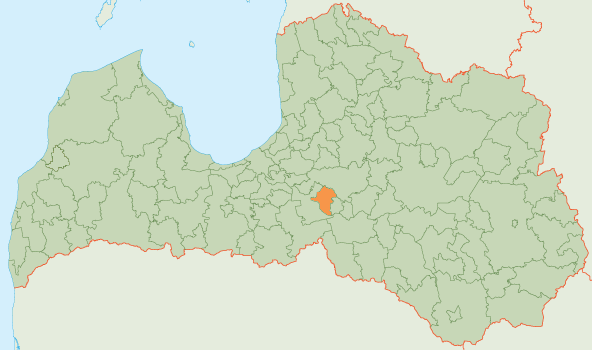
- Country: Latvia
- Formed: 2004
- Centre: Lielvārde

Government
  - Council Chair: Santa Ločmale (LZS)

Area
  - Total: 225.62 km^{2} (87.11 sq mi)
  - Land: 213.84 km^{2} (82.56 sq mi)
  - Water: 11.78 km^{2} (4.55 sq mi)

Population (2021)
  - Total: 9,547
  - Density: 44.65/km^{2} (115.6/sq mi)
- Website: www.lielvarde.lv

Lielvārde Municipality (Latvian: Lielvārdes novads) was a municipality in Vidzeme, Latvia. The municipality was formed in 2004 by reorganization of Lielvārde town with its countryside territory. In 2009 it absorbed Jumprava parish and Lēdmane parish, the administrative centre being Lielvārde. In 2010 Lielvārde parish was created from the countryside territory of Lielvārde town.

On 1 July 2021, Lielvārde Municipality ceased to exist and its territory was merged into Ogre Municipality.

== See also ==
- Administrative divisions of Latvia
