= Ikšķile Municipality =

Municipality of Latvia

Coordinates: 56°49′00″N 24°29′00″E

Ikšķile Municipality Ikšķiles novads
- Former municipality
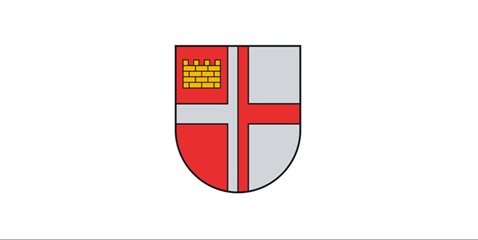
- Flag Coat of arms

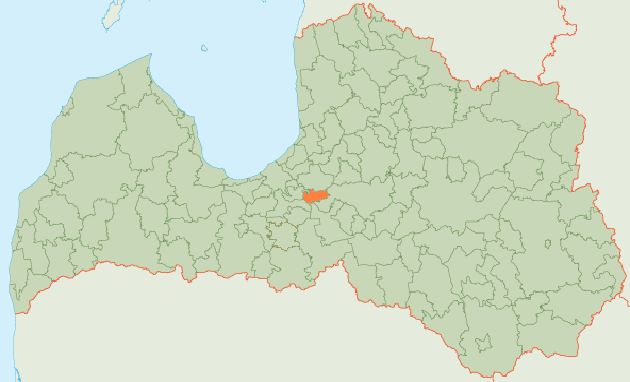
- Country: Latvia
- Formed: 2004
- Centre: Ikšķile

Government
  - Council Chairman: Indulis Trapiņš (LZP)

Area
  - Total: 130.71 km^{2} (50.47 sq mi)
  - Land: 123.09 km^{2} (47.53 sq mi)
  - Water: 7.62 km^{2} (2.94 sq mi)

Population (2021)
  - Total: 9,967
  - Density: 80.97/km^{2} (209.7/sq mi)
- Website: www.ikskile.lv

Ikšķile Municipality (Latvian: Ikšķiles novads) is a former municipality in Vidzeme, Latvia. The municipality was formed in 2004 by reorganization of Ikšķile town with its countryside territory, the administrative centre being Ikšķile. In 2010 Tīnūži parish was created from the countryside territory of Ikšķile town. The population in 2020 was 9,888.

On 1 July 2021, Ikšķile Municipality ceased to exist and its territory was merged into Ogre Municipality.

== See also ==
- Administrative divisions of Latvia
