= Līčupe =

Village in Latvia

Coordinates: 56°54′N 25°25′E

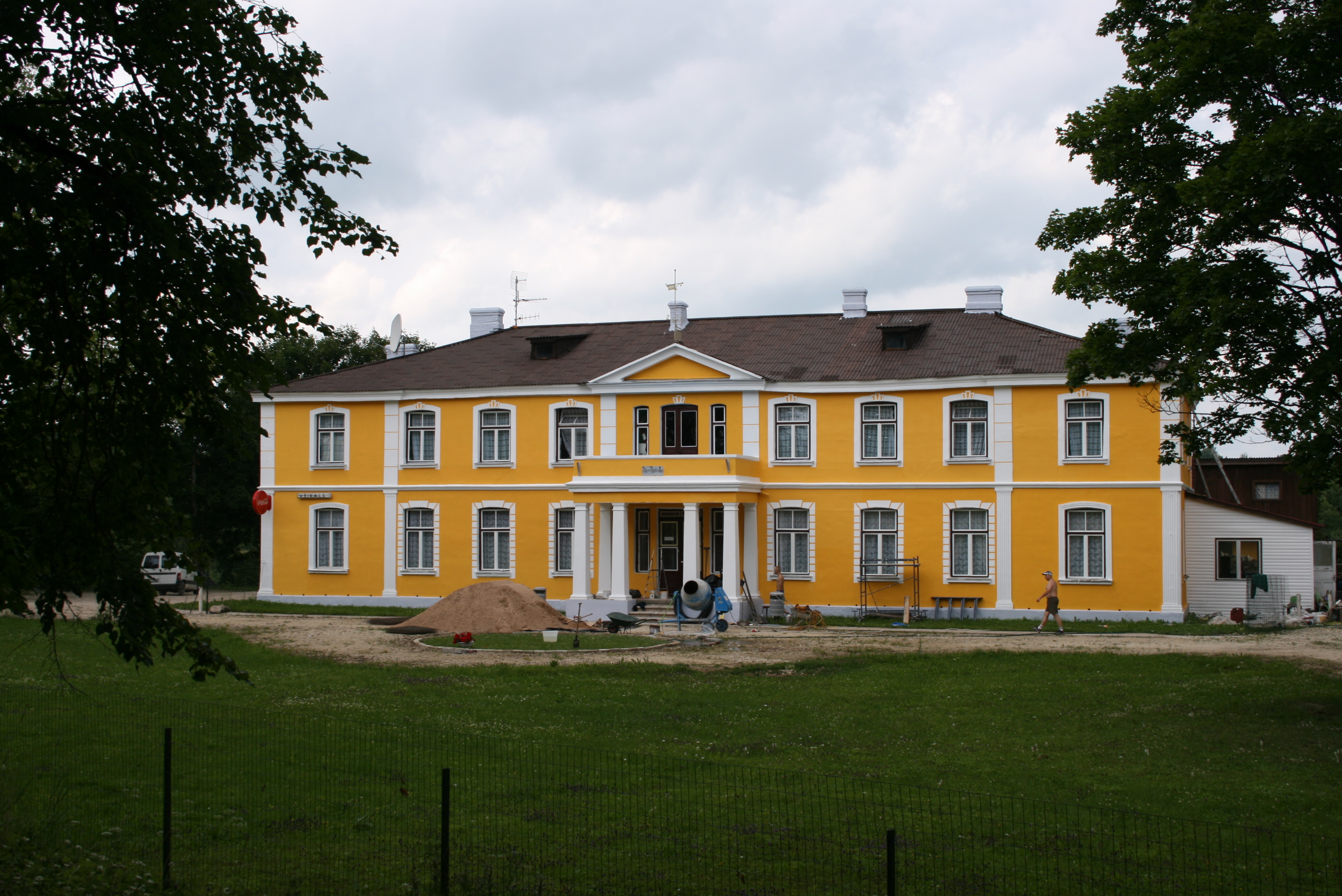
Līčupe Manor

Līčupe (formerly Braki) is a village and the center of Mazozoli Parish, Ogre Municipality in the Vidzeme region of Latvia. The population in 2023 was 250.

Līčupe is located along the Riga–Ērgļi freeway (P4). The village, which formed as a kolkhoz center during the Soviet period in Latvia, is known for its production of Latvian apple cider.
