= Mazozoli Parish =

Parish of Latvia

- parish of Latvia
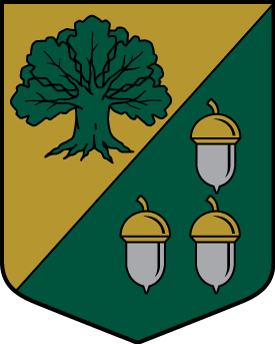
- Coat of arms

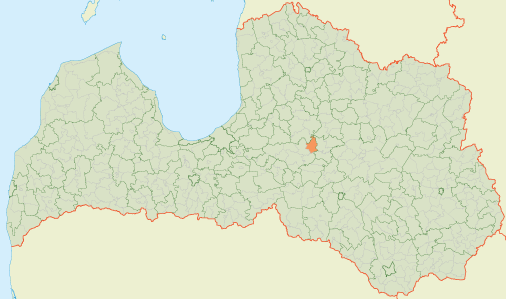
- Coordinates: 56°55′08″N 25°27′39″E
- Country: Latvia

Population (1 January 2026)
  - Total: 400

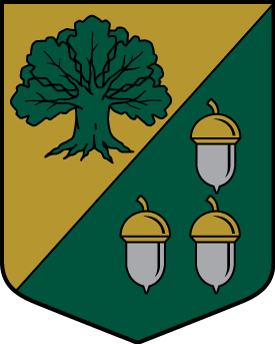
Coat of arms

Mazozoli Parish (Latvian: Mazozolu pagasts) is an administrative unit of Ogre Municipality in the Vidzeme region of Latvia.

== Towns, villages and settlements of Mazozoli Parish ==
- Braki
