= Tīnūži Parish =

Parish in Ogre Municipality, Latvia

- parish of Latvia
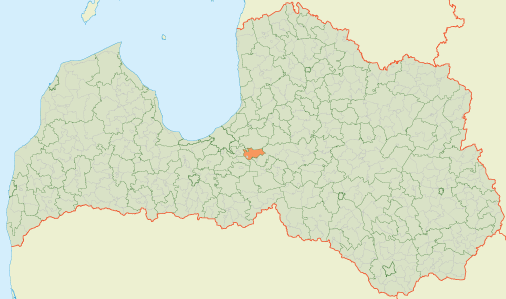
- 56°51′40″N 24°35′08″E
- Country: Latvia

Area
  - Total: 120.77 km^{2} (46.63 sq mi)
  - Land: 113.26 km^{2} (43.73 sq mi)
  - Water: 7.51 km^{2} (2.90 sq mi)

Population (1 January 2025)
  - Total: 3,066
  - Density: 27.07/km^{2} (70.11/sq mi)

Tīnūži Parish (Latvian: Tīnūžu pagasts) is an administrative unit of Ogre Municipality, Latvia. It was created in 2010 from the countryside territory of Ikšķile town. At the beginning of 2014, the population of the parish was 2446. The administrative center is Tīnūži village.

== Towns, villages and settlements of Tīnūži parish ==
- Ceplīši
- Dobelnieki
- Elkšņi
- Kalnāji
- Tīnūži
- Turkalne
