= Suntaži Parish =

Parish of Latvia

- parish of Latvia
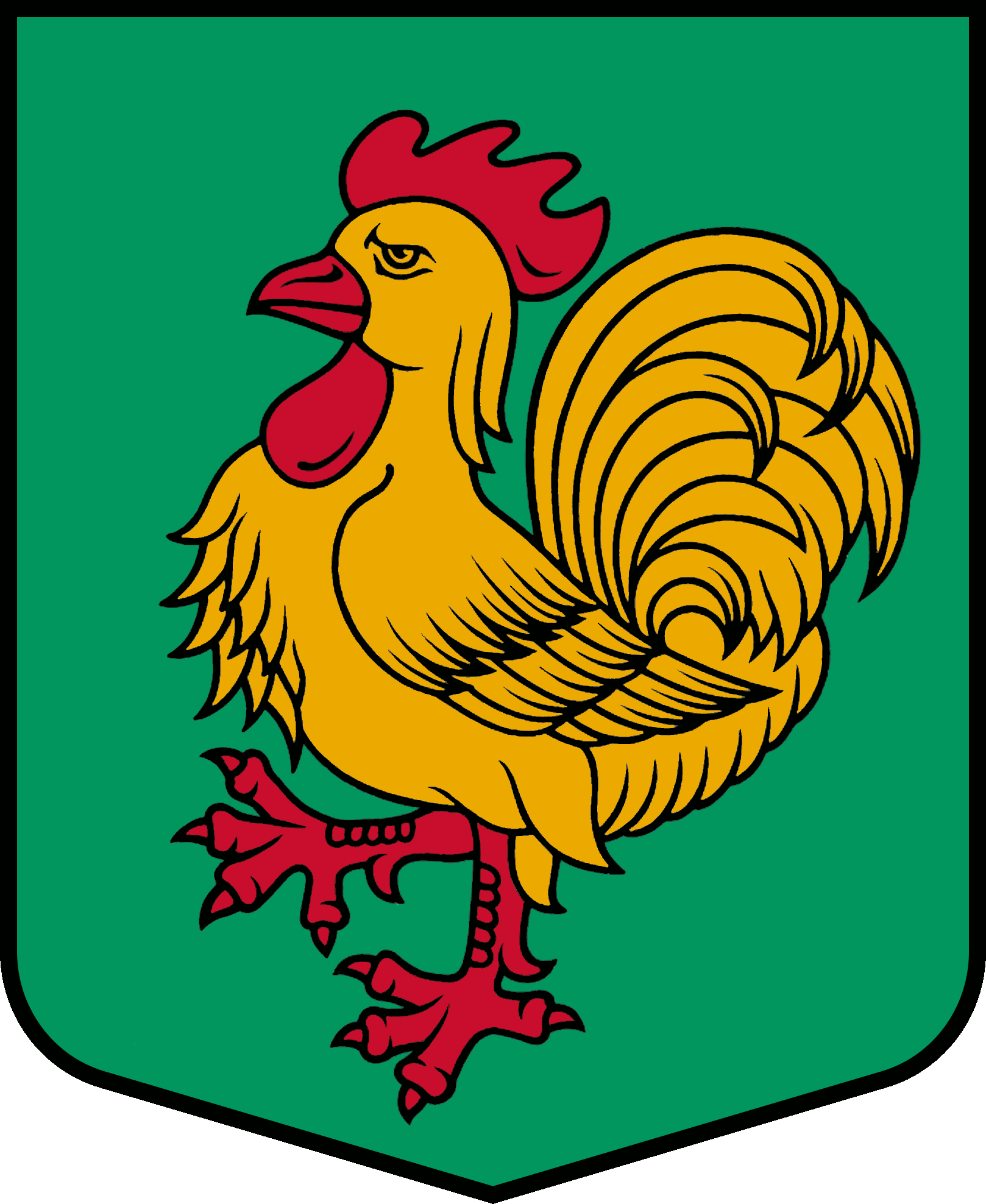
- Coat of arms

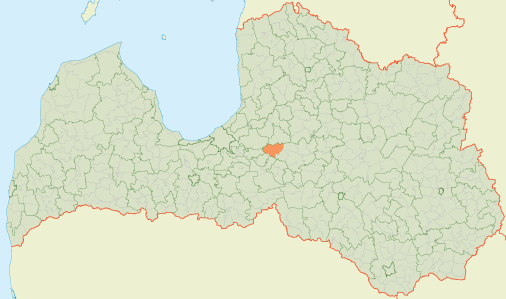
- Coordinates: 56°53′29″N 24°53′07″E
- Country: Latvia

Population (1 January 2026)
  - Total: 1,603

Suntaži Parish (Latvian: Suntažu pagasts) is an administrative unit of Ogre Municipality in the Vidzeme region of Latvia. Its center is the village of Suntaži.

== Villages and settlements of Suntaži Parish ==
- Suntaži - parish administrative center
- Jugla (village)
- Glāznieki
- Upespils
- Ķieģelceplis
- Viršņukalns
