= Ogre Municipality =

Municipality of Latvia

Coordinates: 56.8461°N 25.0525°E

Ogre Municipality Ogres novads
- Municipality
- Flag Coat of arms

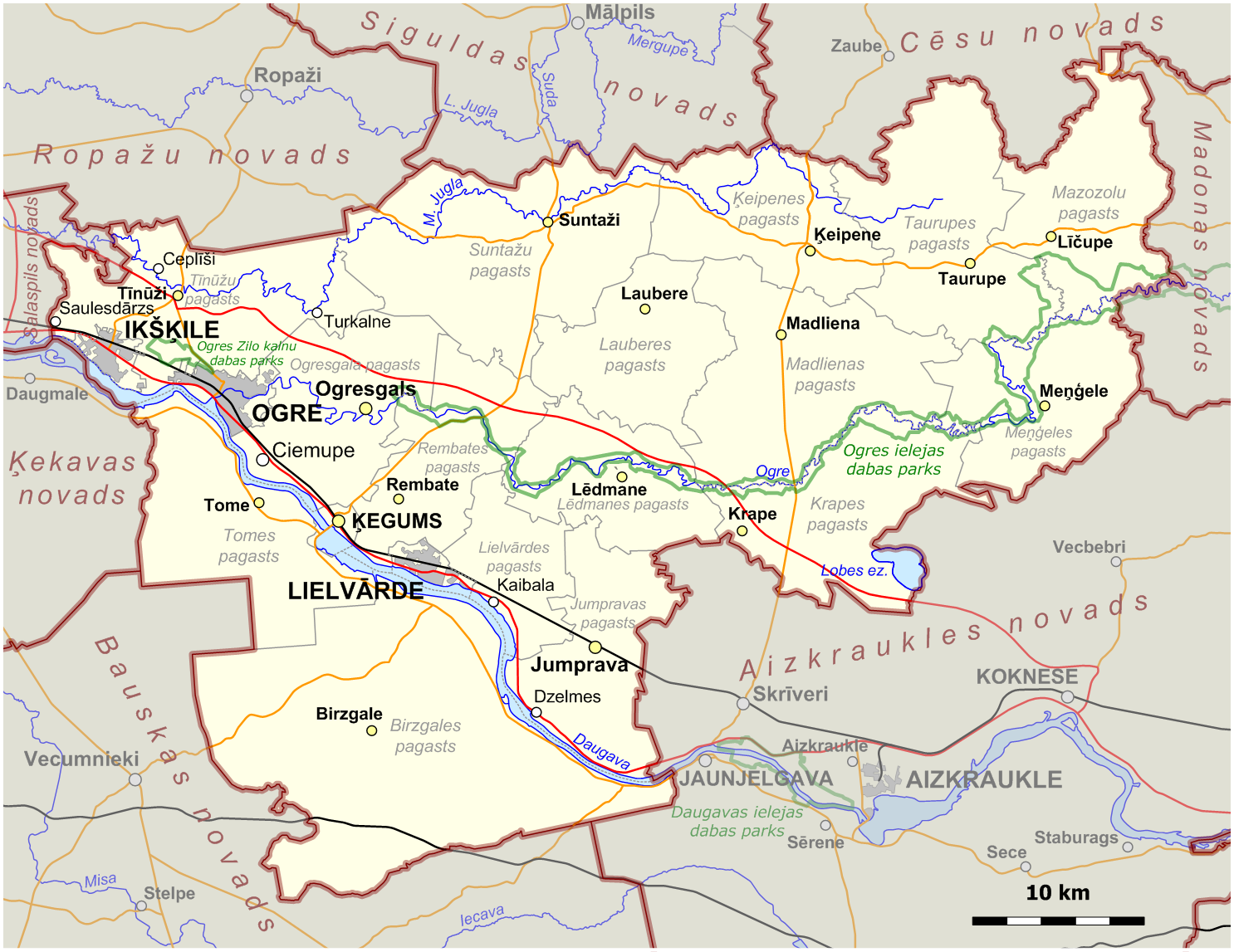
- Country: Latvia
- Formed: 2002
- Reformed: 2021
- Centre: Ogre

Government
  - Council Chair: Egils Helmanis (NA)

Area
  - Total: 1,839.38 km^{2} (710.19 sq mi)
  - Land: 1,749.33 km^{2} (675.42 sq mi)

Population (2026)
  - Total: 57,165
  - Density: 32.678/km^{2} (84.636/sq mi)
- Website: www.ogresnovads.lv

Ogre Municipality (Latvian: Ogres novads) is a municipality in Vidzeme, Latvia. The municipality was formed in 2002 by merging Ogre town and Ogresgals Parish. In 2009 it absorbed Krape Parish, Ķeipene Parish, Laubere Parish, Madliena Parish, Mazozoli Parish, Meņģele Parish, Suntaži Parish and Taurupe Parish, the administrative centre being Ogre. The population in 2021 was 57,617.

During the 2021 Latvian administrative reform, the previous municipality was merged with Ikšķile Municipality, Ķegums Municipality and Lielvārde Municipality. The new municipality now fully corresponds with the area of the former Ogre district.

== Population ==
Territorial unit	Population (year)
Birzgale Parish	1518 (2021)
Ikšķile	7278 (2021)
Jumprava Parish	1662 (2021)
Krape Parish	605 (2021)
Ķegums	2103 (2021)
Ķeipene Parish	849 (2021)
Laubere Parish	568 (2021)
Lēdmane Parish	1092 (2021)
Lielvārde	5907 (2021)
Lielvārde Parish	886 (2021)
Madliena Parish	1476 (2021)
Mazozoli Parish	437 (2021)
Meņģele Parish	473 (2021)
Ogre	22978 (2021)
Ogresgals Parish	3055 (2021)
Rembate Parish	1026 (2021)
Suntaži Parish	1650 (2021)
Taurupe Parish	699 (2021)
Tīnūži Parish	2689 (2021)
Tome Parish	666 (2021)

== Twin towns – sister cities ==
Ogre is twinned with:

- Ånge, Sweden
- Bollnäs, Sweden
- Chernihiv, Ukraine
- Haapsalu, Estonia
- Hengelo, Netherlands
- Jõhvi, Estonia
- Joué-lès-Tours, France
- Kelmė, Lithuania
- Kerava, Finland
- Lębork, Poland
- Maymana, Afghanistan
- Popasna, Ukraine

== Notable people ==
- Kārlis Hūns (1831 in Madliena Parish – 1877), a Baltic German history, genre and landscape painter
- Andrejs Pumpurs (1841 in Birzgale Parish – 1902), a poet, soldier and staunch promoter of Latvian culture.
- Ivande Kaija (1876 in Jumprava Parish – 1942), the pen name of Antonija Lūkina, a Latvian writer and feminist
- Eduards Kalniņš (1876 in Plātere Parish – 1964), a Latvian general, politician and Minister of Defence, in 1926 and 1928
- Andrejs Apsītis (1888 – 1945), a Latvian cyclist, competed in the 1912 and 1924 Summer Olympics
- Kārlis Vilciņš (1892 – 1972), wrestler, competed in the Greco-Roman middleweight event at the 1924 Summer Olympics
- Pyotr Pumpur (1900 in Plātere Parish – 1942), Soviet Air Forces fighter pilot
- Kārlis Ozoliņš (1905 – 1987), a Latvian Soviet politician, journalist and chair of the Supreme Soviet of the Latvian SSR, 1952 to 1959
- Aija Andrejeva (born 1986 in Lielvarde), singer, stage name Aisha
- Kristaps Dārgais (born 1990 in Jumprava Parish), a former basketball player

== See also ==
- Administrative divisions of Latvia (2009)
