= Ķeipene Parish =

Parish of Latvia

- parish of Latvia
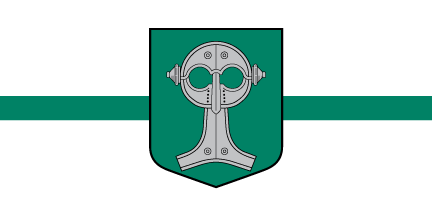
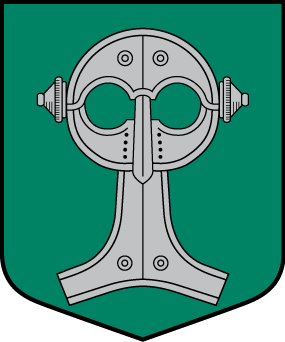
- Flag Coat of arms

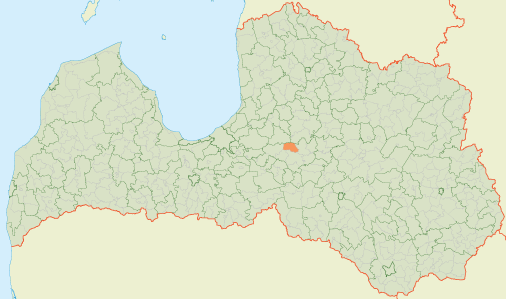
- Coordinates: 56°54′24″N 25°08′28″E
- Country: Latvia

Population (1 January 2026)
  - Total: 783

Ķeipene Parish (Latvian: Ķeipenes pagasts) is an administrative unit of Ogre Municipality in the Vidzeme region of Latvia. Its center is the village of Ķeipene.

== Towns, villages and settlements of Ķeipene Parish ==
- Ķeipene
- Vatrāne
- Diedziņš (Kastrāne)
