= Ogresgals Parish =

Administrative unit in Latvia

- parish of Latvia
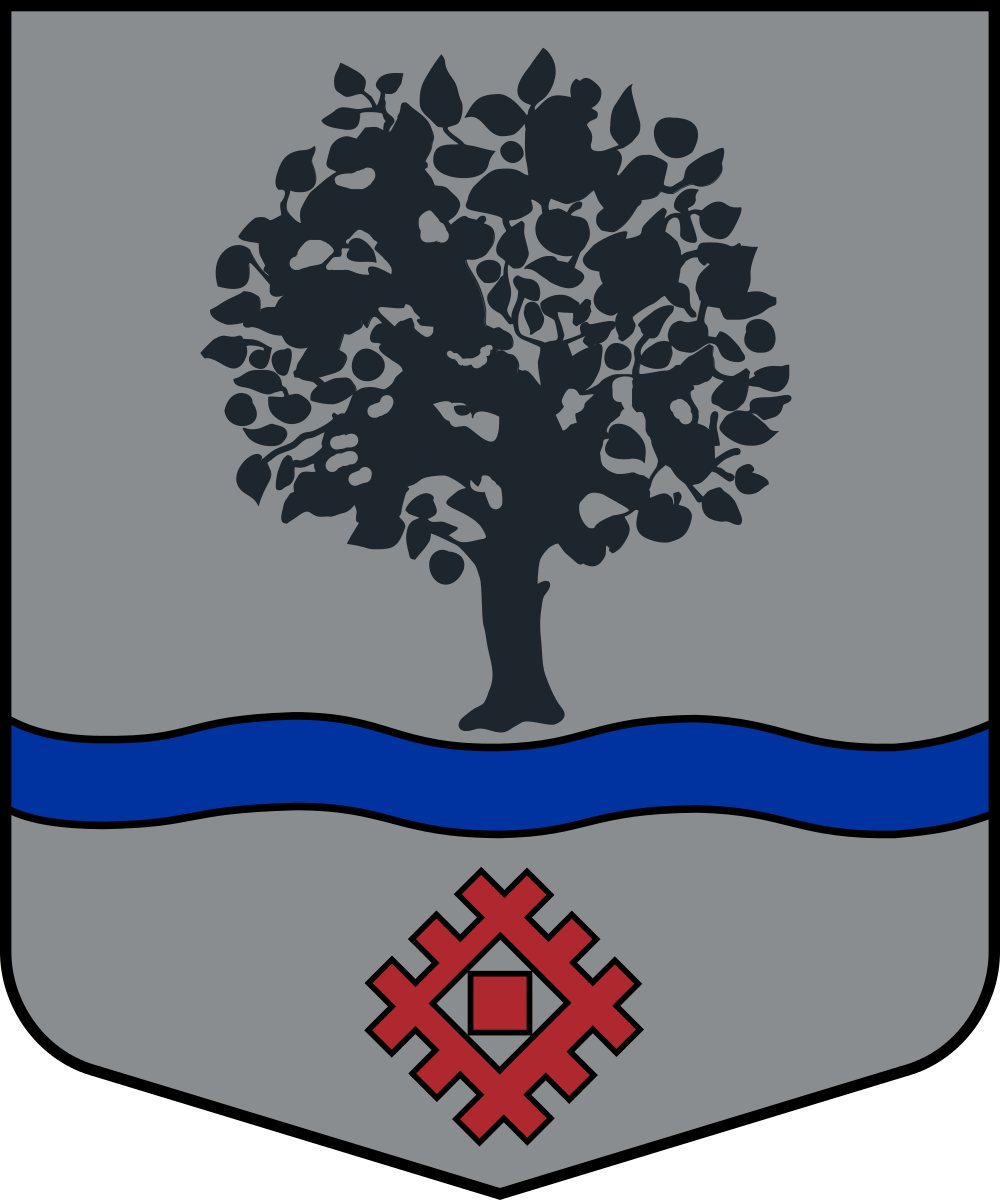
- Coat of arms

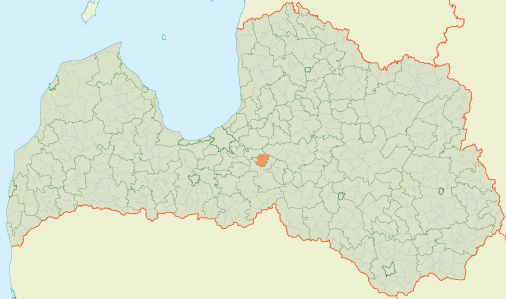
- Coordinates: 56°48′25″N 24°43′21″E
- Country: Latvia

Population (1 January 2026)
  - Total: 3,187

Ogresgals Parish is an administrative unit of Ogre Municipality in the Vidzeme region of Latvia.
