= Ivande Kaija =

Latvian author

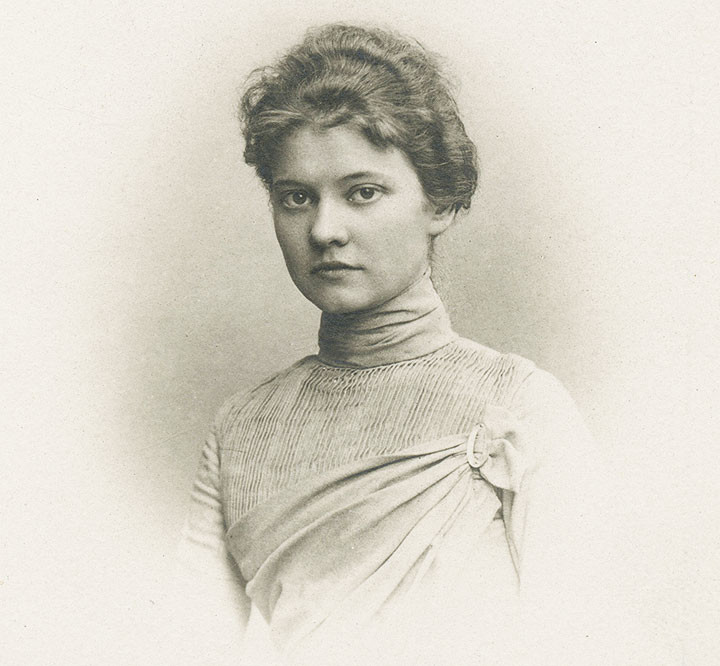
- circa 1931
- Born: Antonija Meldere-Millere; 13 October 1876; Jumpravmuiža, Governorate of Livonia, Russian Empire
- Died: 2 January 1942 (aged 65); Riga, Generalbezirk Lettland, Reichskommissariat Ostland
- Other name: Antonija Lūkina
- Occupations: writer, feminist, nationalist
- Years active: 1892-1921
- Notable work: Iedzimtais grēks

Ivande Kaija was the pen name of Antonija Lūkina (née Antonija Meldere-Millere 1876–1942), Latvian writer and feminist, who fought for the independence of Latvia. Through public works and writing, Kaija advocated Latvians to donate assets to the "Gold Fund" which became the gold reserve of the country in 1920. Her public service was honored when she was bestowed the Order of the Three Stars in 1926. Though many of her works were destroyed during the Soviet period, they have seen a resurgence in recent years.

== Biography ==
Antonija Meldere-Millere was born on 13 October 1876 in Jumpravmuižā, Governorate of Livonia, Russian Empire to Miķelis and Matilde (née Flintman) Millere-Meldere. Her father became a well-to-do business owner and landlord and moved his family to Torņakalns, where Antonija began her schooling in 1881. After completing elementary school, she went on to study at the Lomonosov Women's Gymnasium in Riga. During her schooldays at Lomonosov, she developed a friendship with Fēlikss Lūkins, whom she would later marry and published her first novel, Trīs jaungada naktis (Three New Year's Nights) in 1892. After completing high school in 1895, she went on to further her education, studying philosophy and art history at the University of Bern, Switzerland and University of Leipzig, Germany. Taking advantage of the museums and art galleries, she supplemented her knowledge and learned English, French, German, Italian, Latin and Russian. In 1901, she abandoned her studies and married Lūkins, who had become an ophthalmologist and would later found the Latvian Physicians Association. The next few years, Lūkina worked as a journalist, had three children. In 1910, she went to Switzerland, where Rainis and Aspazija were living in exile, with her husband's support, to gain their input on her writing. During the visit, after a visit to a cemetery, she selected the pen name "Kaija", meaning seagull, from a monument she saw at a cemetery in Lugano.

== Career ==
Around the same time, Lūkina decided to resume her studies and went to France to take journalism classes at the Sorbonne. She first began to notice her hearing loss around 1911, which would progressively worsen. She wrote editorials for the Collège de France and traveled throughout France, Italy and made at least one more trip to Switzerland before returning to Riga in 1913. That year, she published Iedzimtais grēks (Inherent Sin) and began using the pseudonym Kaija. The book dealt with marital dissatisfaction and free love, and caused a stir for its controversial depiction of female sexual liberation. She published other articles on themes about civic, political and social issues affecting women in journals such as Dzimtenes Vēstnesis (Homeland Gazette) and Latviešu izglītības biedrības gadagrāmata (The Almanac of the Latvian Educational Association).

During World War I, Kaija's husband was called up to serve as a surgeon and the family followed him to posts in the Crimea, Moscow and Petrograd. An epidemic of trachoma, an infectious eye disease, made it impossible for Lūkins to return to Latvia for nearly four years, but Kaija returned in 1917, with her daughter. She wrote articles favoring independence and worked as a social worker through the end of the war. As a supporter of Latvian independence, she was a deputy candidate for the first Latvian parliament and assisted with assembling the ministerial cabinet in 1918. That same year, she helped found the Latvijas Sieviešu Asociācija (Latvian Women’s Association), which was a women’s rights organization seeking suffrage. Latvian independence was declared in November 1918, but the peace treaty with the Soviet Union was not signed until 1920. Simultaneously with independence, women were granted the right to vote. Between 1919 and 1920, she set up the Zelta fonds (Gold Fund) to aid the new Latvian Republic. Kaija called upon women to donate jewelry, silverware, and other tangible assets which were deposited, and after the war became the gold reserve of the government.

Beginning in 1920, Kaija worked in the Foreign Office of the Republic of Latvia, as a French press commentator and was head of the art and literature department of Latvijas Sargs (Latvian Guard). She published another novel Jūgā (In Bondage) in 1919, which evaluated the institution of marriage and the following year, published Sfinksa (Sphinx), which reiterated the theme of a woman looking for the perfect love. In 1920, she also published Dzintarzeme (Amber Land), a historical novel about the ancient people of the Baltics. In March 1921, Lūkins finally returned home, after having spent some time in a sanatorium for tuberculosis, and the couple took a holiday together. A few months later in Valmiera, Kaija gave a rare speech, which she did not often do because of her hearing difficulty, on social issues facing the nation. Shortly after the lecture, she had a stroke, losing her remaining hearing, her ability to speak and her mobility. She spent three years in rehabilitation and regained the ability to walk awkwardly, but her right arm was paralyzed. Her hearing did not return, though she maintained her correspondence and writing by learning to write left-handed.

In 1926, Kaija was awarded the Order of the Three Stars for her role in helping to build the Latvian state. Between 1928 and 1931, she published a collection of her works in ten volumes. Increasingly, she found it difficult to continue writing and, by 1936, had all but stopped working. When the Soviet occupation of Latvia began, Kaija's works were removed from libraries and her works were disparaged. She was injured in a car accident on her way home from services on Christmas Eve 1941 and taken to the hospital, where she died on 2 January 1942. Kaija was buried at the Forest Cemetery in Riga.

== Legacy ==
At the time of Kaija's death, her works were discounted by the Soviet regime, but the contemporary relevance of her works has experienced a resurgence subsequently. In 2006, her 130th birthday was honored by the Mālpils Parish Council, with selected readings and a public lecture.

== Citations ==
=== References ===
- Bicēna, Baiba (13 October 2014). "Mūsu likteņbiedre Ivande Kaija" (in Latvian). Riga, Latvia: Apeirons.
- Cornis-Pope, Marcel; Neubauer, John (2010). History of the Literary Cultures of East-Central Europe: Types and stereotypes. Amsterdam, the Netherlands: John Benjamins Publishing. ISBN 978-90-272-3458-2.
- Карклиня, Инга (28 June 2006). "Рыцарь Духа Феликс Денисович Лукин". Lomonosov (in Russian). St. Petersburg, Russia: АДАМАНТ.
- Krilovska, Dace (November 2006). "Kā Putns Ar Aizlauztiem Spārniem" (PDF). Mâlpils VÇSTIS (in Latvian). 11 (71). Mālpils, Latvia: Mâlpils pagasta padomes: 6–8. Archived from the original (PDF) on 3 April 2016.
- Meshkova, Sandra (2006). "Kaija, Ivande (born Antonija Millere-Meldere, married name Antonija Lukina 1876–1941)". In de Haan, Francisca; Daskalova, Krasimira; Loutfi, Anna (eds.). Biographical Dictionary of Women's Movements and Feminisms in Central, Eastern, and South Eastern Europe: 19th and 20th Centuries. Budapest, Hungary: Central European University Press. pp. 204–206. ISBN 978-963-7326-39-4 – via Project MUSE.
- Rodgers, Hugh I. (1975). Search for Security: A Study in Baltic Diplomacy, 1920 - 1934. Hamden, Connecticut: Archon Books. p. 8. ISBN 978-0-208-01478-8. "Shortly after the proclamation of Latvian independence in November, 1918…On August 11, 1920, the soviets signed a peace treaty…"
- Towns, Ann E. (2010). Women and States: Norms and Hierarchies in International Society. Cambridge, England: Cambridge University Press. ISBN 978-0-521-76885-6.
- "Ivande Kaija" (in Latvian). Riga, Latvia: Nekropole. 2016.
