= Lēdmane Parish =

Parish of Latvia

- parish of Latvia
- Coat of arms

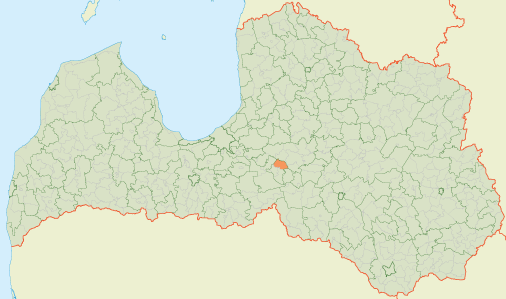
- Coordinates: 56°46′03″N 25°00′00″E
- Country: Latvia

Population (1 January 2026)
  - Total: 999

Lēdmane Parish (Latvian: Lēdmanes pagasts) is an administrative unit of Ogre Municipality in the Vidzeme region of Latvia.

== History ==
The current territory of Lēdmane was formed by many centuries as a part of Lielvārde county. The first archaeological finds are from the early Iron Age, as evidenced by parish 2 – 4th century. Tomb Coaster or T.S. skeletonapi. Until the 13th century, Lēdmane's neighborhood was located Daugava Līvzeme territory, later it came to Riga Archbishop. After Livonian War, a heavily destroyed county came to Duchy of Livonia's Koknese Stāvija s composition.

Swedish Livonia time 1638. The year remained in history as a "Large Vidzeme Dying". In these years, there was also a large movement of farmers. But with the time Lēdmane surroundings began to brighten. The land affected by the land created an idol or sod mansion, which was located a few kilometers south of the current lady. Here and in other manors, most farmers were closed from Duchy of Courland and Semigallia. In 1700, Great Northern War, followed by plague outbreak. Because of the losses of the large population in the neighborhood of Lēdmane, inflow people from Poland-Lithuania Latgale and even from Belarus.

From 1837 the Elkish manor managed Baron Transehe-Roseneck, which owned a wide range of manor property in other places, also Ceipene and Taurupe. Lēdmanes parish suffered a revolution and both world war years.

One of the first schools in the parish has been a Sunday School of Vecbeck Houses, which operated in the 19th century. in the middle and the second half. Parish Elementary School in 1873. At first it was a six-year-old school, the first manager and the teacher was Mārtiņš Vīksna. In later years, the school was expanded until the new school was built.

In 1935, the area of Lēdmane parish was 49.7 km². In 1945, Lēdmanes established village council, which was eliminated in 1947, but renewed in 1949 after liquidation of the parish. In 1951, the village of Lēdmane was added to the part Drujugala village, 1963 – part Rembates village. In 1990, the village was reorganized on the parish. In 2009, the parish as an administrative territory added Lielvarde county.

== Notable places ==
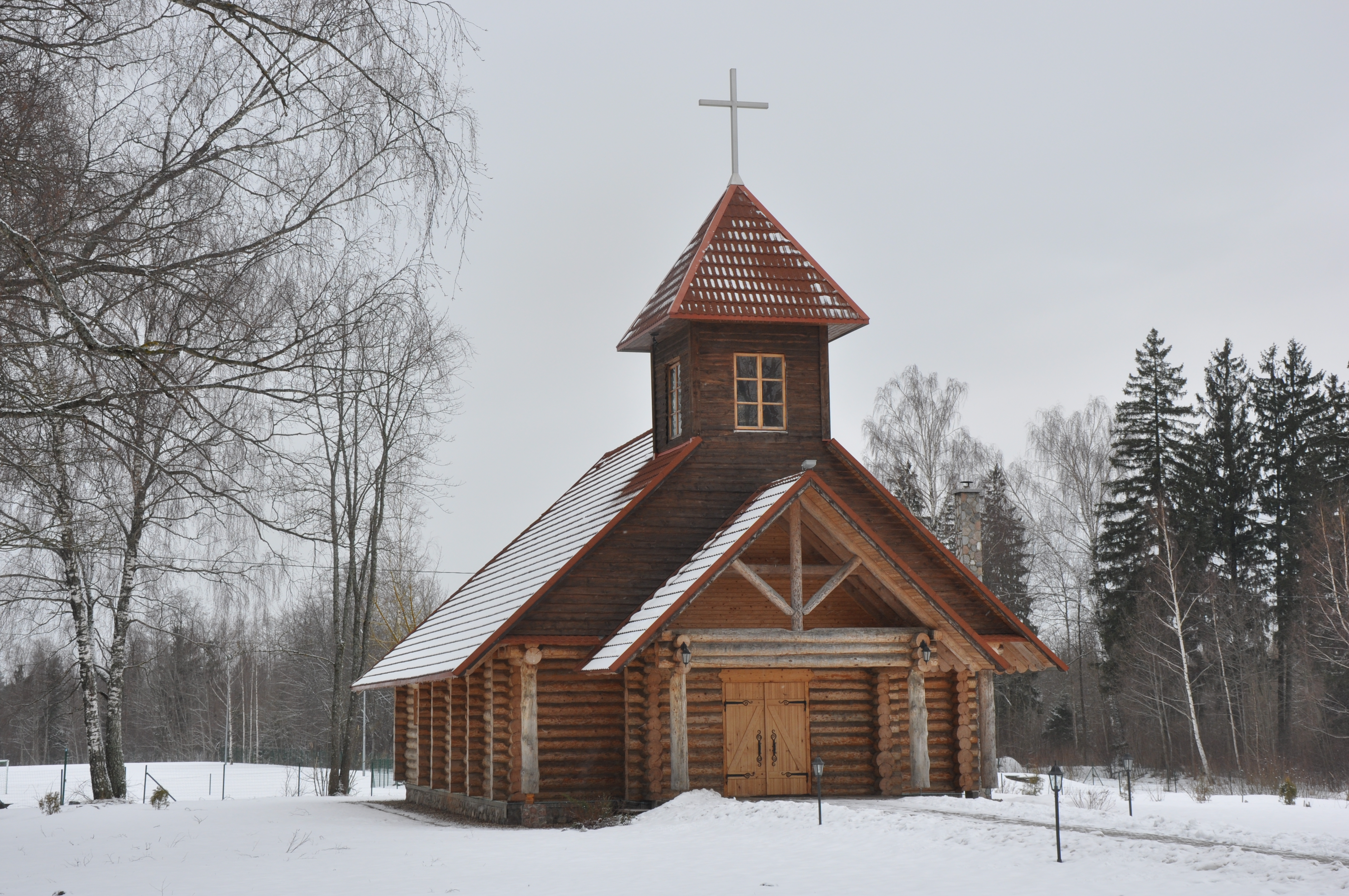
Apostles Peter and Paul Roman Catholic Church in Lēdmane.

- Aviekste mill ruins with dam. The mill was built in 1874 and operated by 1950. In the thirties, there was E. Konrades Aviekste Water Mills with Wool Processing Equipment.
- Lobe water mill – 1904. In the year of red bricks and boulders, the mill built is an architectural monument, as "the old destiny" is beaten Eduards Rozenštrauhs. The mill is typical 20th century. Starting Grain Processing Company with G. Pirvica company in Riga prepared original equipment, and are included in the Technical Monuments list. Nowadays the mill can only be seen from the outside.
- Lēdmanes Manor building – until today, the barn (19th century) and the Moder House (18th century). Most manor buildings burned during the World War I.
- Lēdmane People's House. Built in 1886 near Lobe River Bridge, in the past it was a pub and the opening.
- Rožkalni Ozols – Trunk circumference 6.4 m.
- Acotu oak – tree with trunk circumference 7.5 m is the other thickest Ogre district.
- Farm "Lāči" – The holding is specialized in goat cultivation and goat milk products. By pre-logging in, a possible inspection of the farm and the tasting of goat milk products.
- Farm "Clusters" – Possible Flower Nurser Greenhouses, where roses, freesia and flies are possible.
