= Lielvārde =

Town in Ogre Municipality, Latvia

- Town
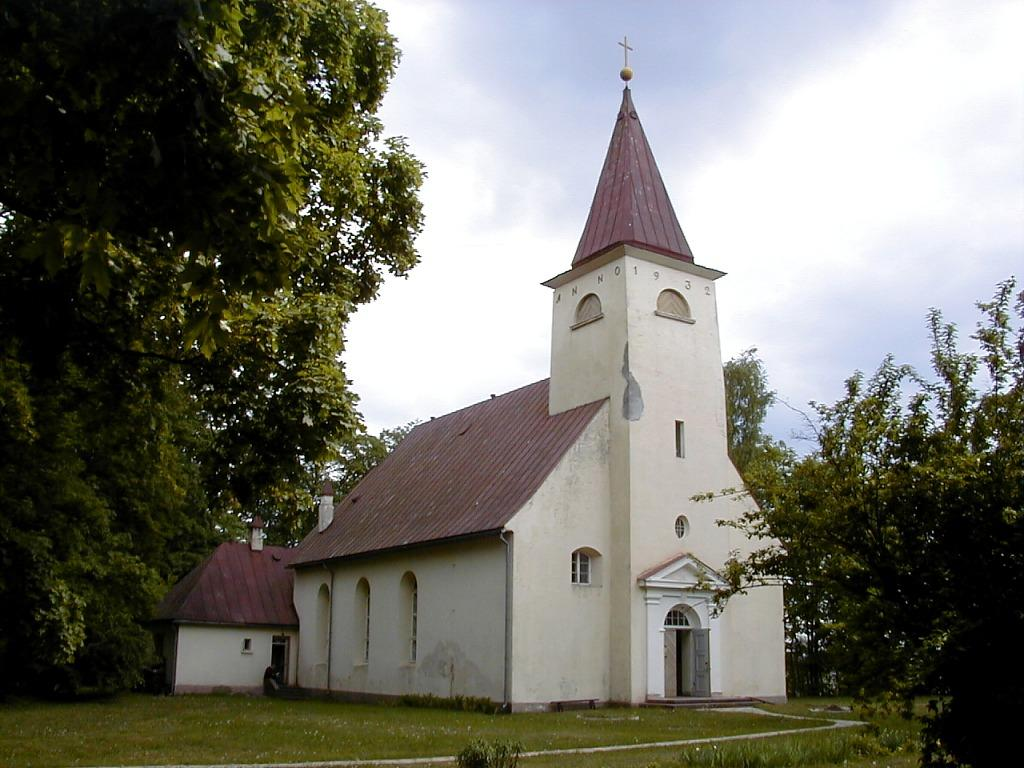
- Lielvārde Lutheran church

- Coat of arms

- Location in Latvia
- Coordinates: 56°42′N 24°50′E
- Country: Latvia
- Municipality: Ogre Municipality
- Town rights: 1992

Area
  - Total: 9.85 km^{2} (3.80 sq mi)
  - Land: 7.59 km^{2} (2.93 sq mi)
  - Water: 2.26 km^{2} (0.87 sq mi)
  - Rural territory: 60 km^{2} (23 sq mi)

Population (2026)
  - Total: 5,866
  - Density: 773/km^{2} (2,000/sq mi)
- Time zone: UTC+2 (EET)
  - Summer (DST): UTC+3 (EEST)
- Postal code: 507(0-1)
- Calling code: +371 650
- Website: http://www.lielvarde.lv/

Lielvārde (German: Lennewarden), population 5885, is a town in Ogre Municipality in the Vidzeme region of Latvia, on the right bank of the Daugava river, 52 km southeast of Riga. The town is also the extra-territorial center of the adjacent Lielvārde Parish.

== History ==
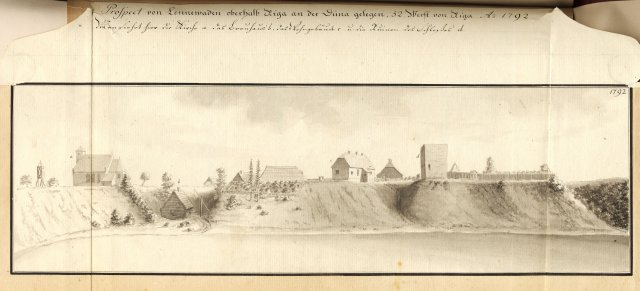
Prospect of Lennewarden on the Daugava river, 52 versts from Riga in 1792. From Johann Christoph Brotze's book Sammlung verschiedner Liefländischer Monumente.

The area was a contact zone between the Finnic Livonians and the Balts, and many prehistoric artifacts have been uncovered there. A Baltic hill-fort named Lennewarden being taken in fief by Albert of Buxhoeveden in 1201 is mentioned in the Chronicle of Henry of Livonia. This site is called Dievukalns (Hill of the Gods) in Latvian. A stone castle was constructed by the Riga diocese in 1229; its ruins are still accessible today.

A parochial school was established when the area was part of Swedish Livonia, but ca. 70% of the population perished in the Great Plague of 1710. The opening of the Riga–Daugavpils Railway in 1861 led to the expansion of the town around the railway station Ringmundhofa later named Rembate. The town was entirely destroyed in World War I but was swiftly rebuilt after Latvia achieved independence.

After the occupation of Latvia and its incorporation into the Soviet Union as the Latvian SSR, Edgars Kauliņš (1903–1979), the local Communist Party secretary, was able to save all of the farmers in the district from deportation during the period of forced collectivization, declaring that there were no kulaks in the area and he would rather be deported himself. In 1948 Kauliņš became the founding chairman of the kolkhoz Lāčplēsis ("The Bear Slayer"), now part of Lielvārde. The kolkhoz became famous for its beer, still brewed by AS Lāčplēša alus, part of the Scandinavian Royal Unibrew brewing group since 2005. Beer is no longer brewed in Lielvārde, the company has only kept the brand. Lielvārde air base was built by the Soviets in 1970; the largest in the Baltic States, it was taken over by the Latvian Air Force in 1994. Since then it is developed into biggest military air base in Latvia.

Lielvārde was granted town rights in 1992.

== Cultural traditions ==
Lielvārde is renowned as the area that inspired the prominent Latvian poets Auseklis and Andrejs Pumpurs, author of the epic Lāčplēsis (The Bear Slayer, 1888), and for the Lielvārdes josta, a traditional woven belt with 22 ancient symbols. Portions of the belt's design are featured on Latvian banknotes, and its symbolism has inspired many artists and folklore enthusiasts, especially those associated with the pagan revival, dievturība.

== Schools ==
- Edgara Kauliņa Lielvārdes Vidusskola
- Lielvārdes Pamatskola
- PII Pūt Vējiņi

== Gallery ==
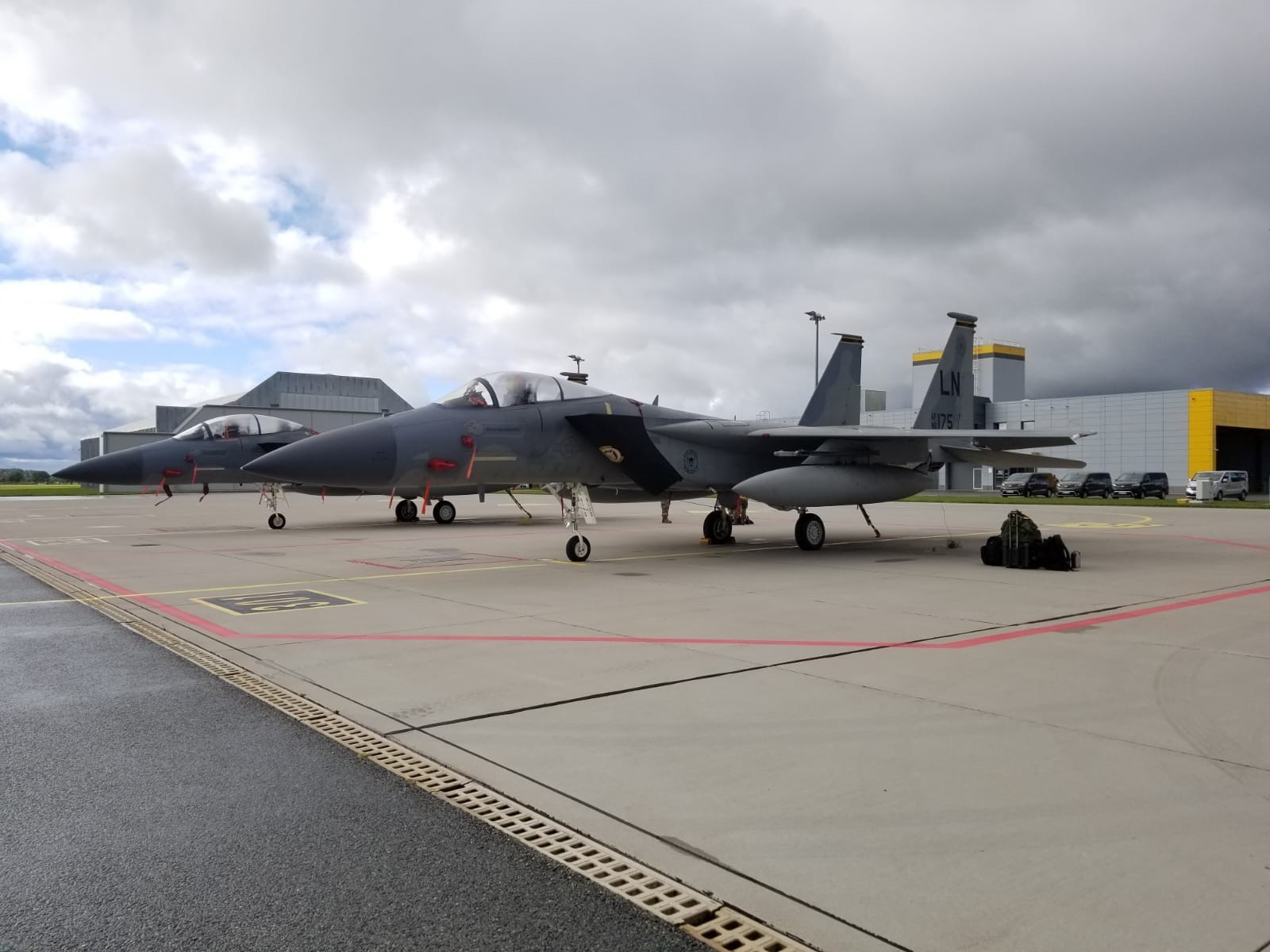
Lielvārde Air base

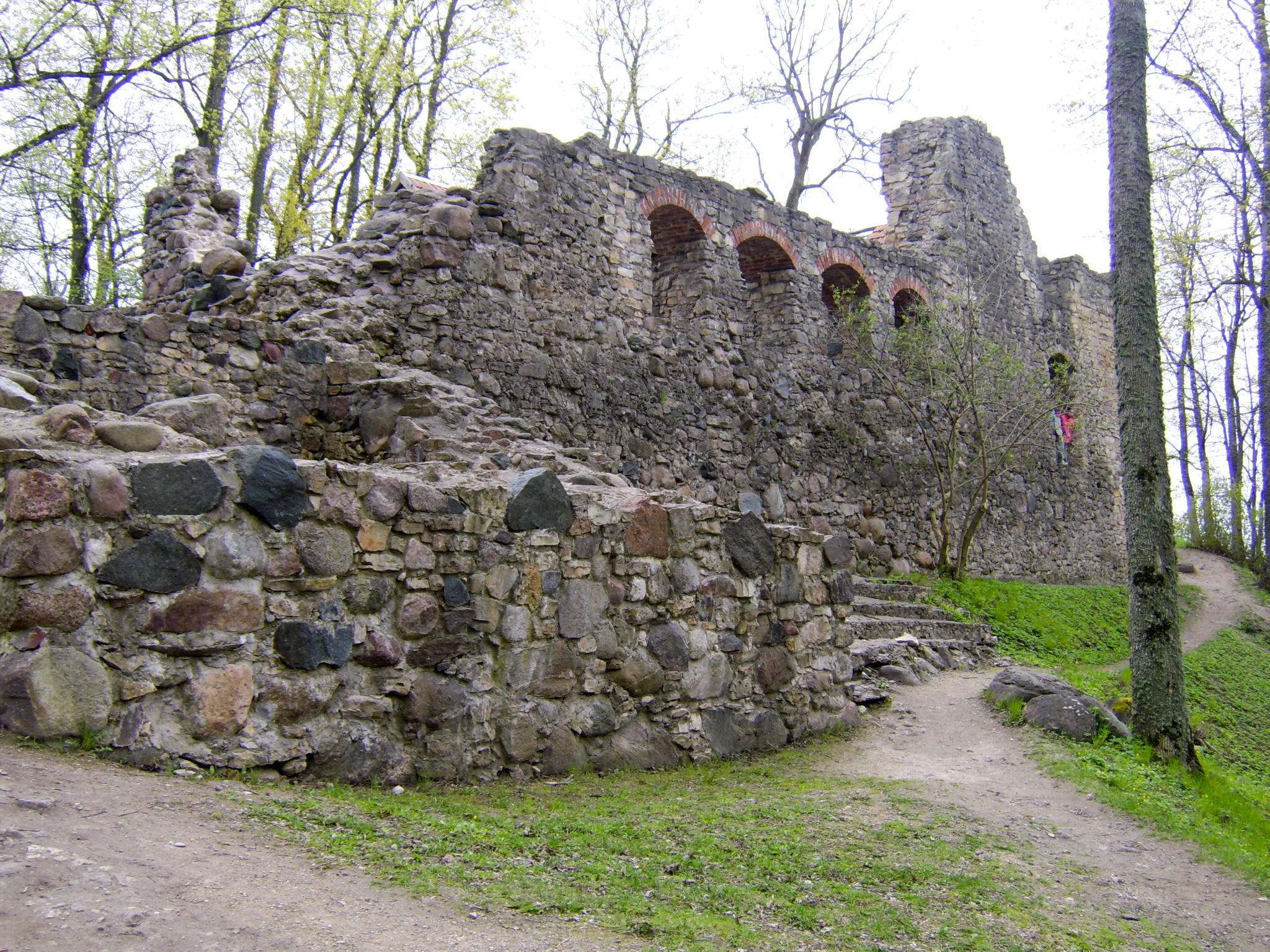
Ruins of Lielvārde medieval castle

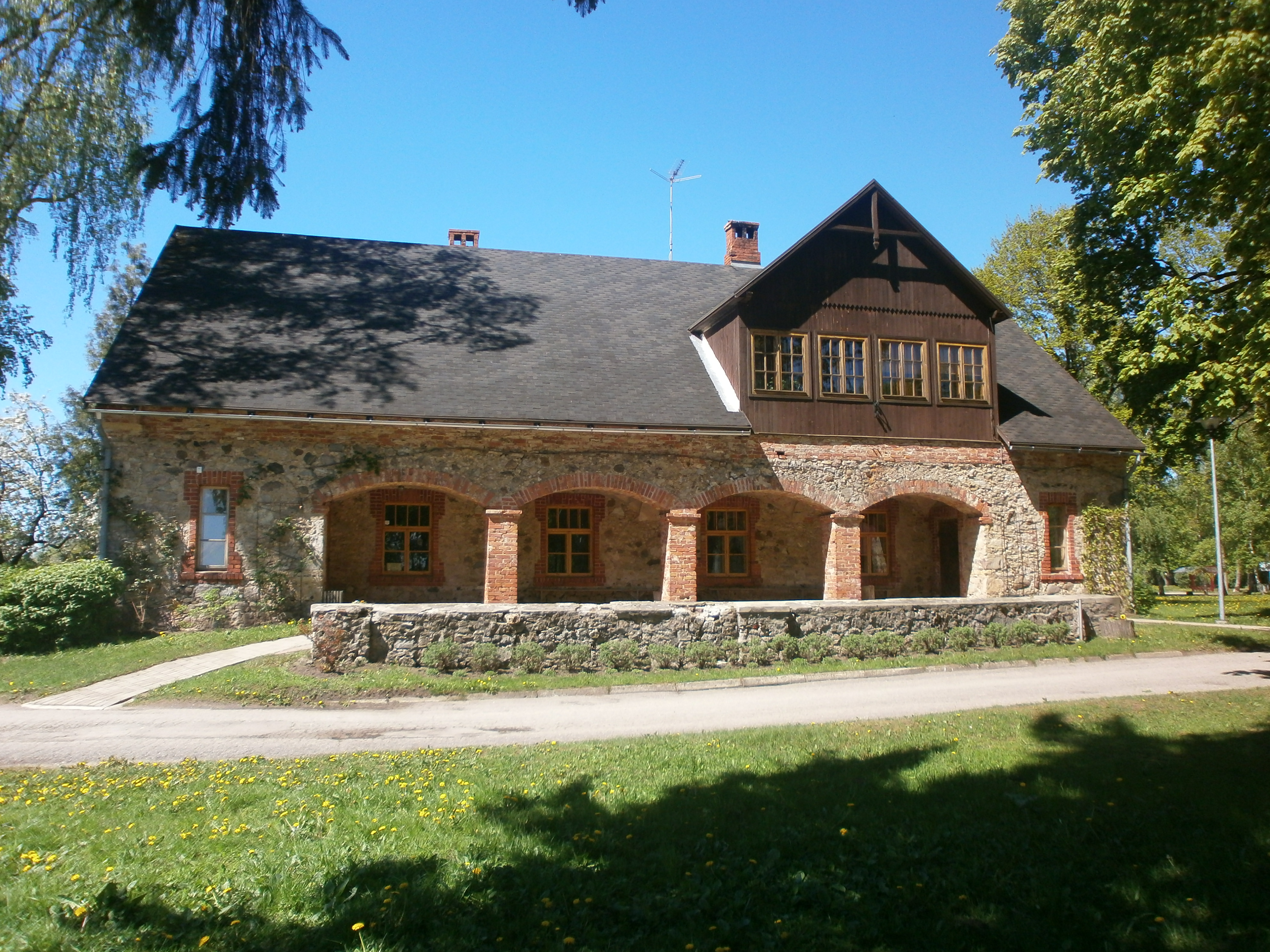
A. Pumpura Lielvārde museum

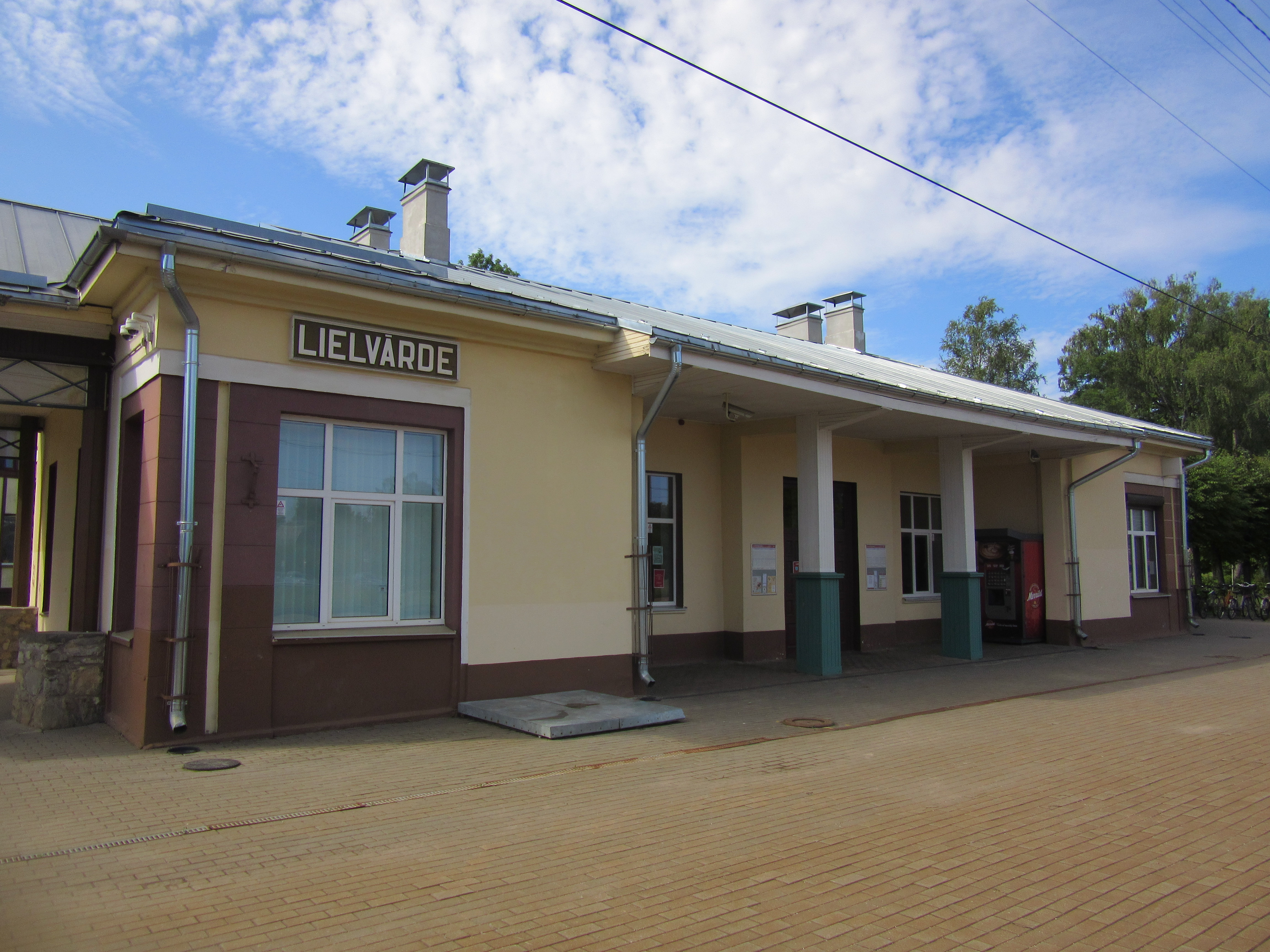
Lielvārde railway station

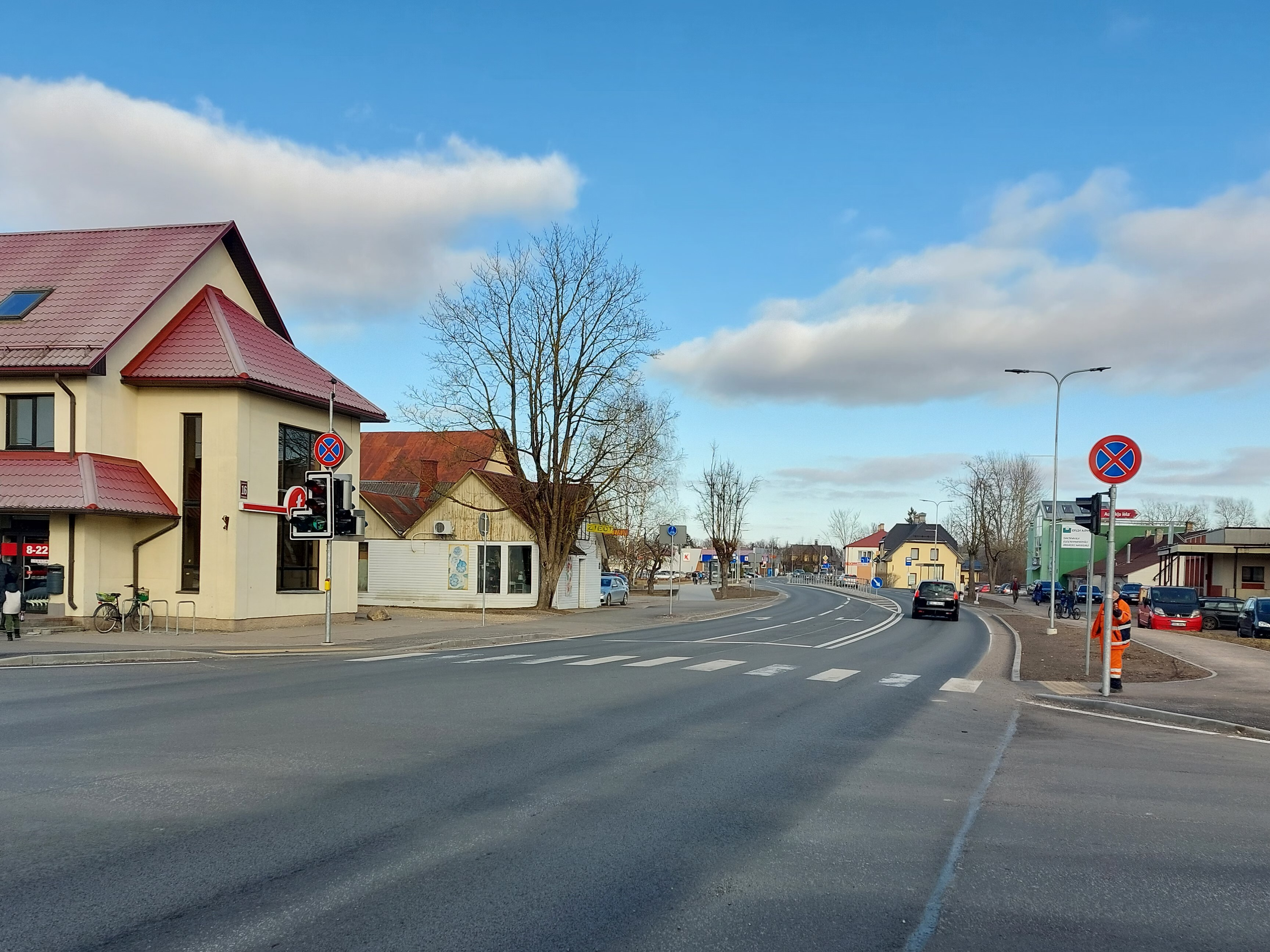
Lāčplēša street in the centre of a town.

Example of the Lielvārde belt design

== See also ==
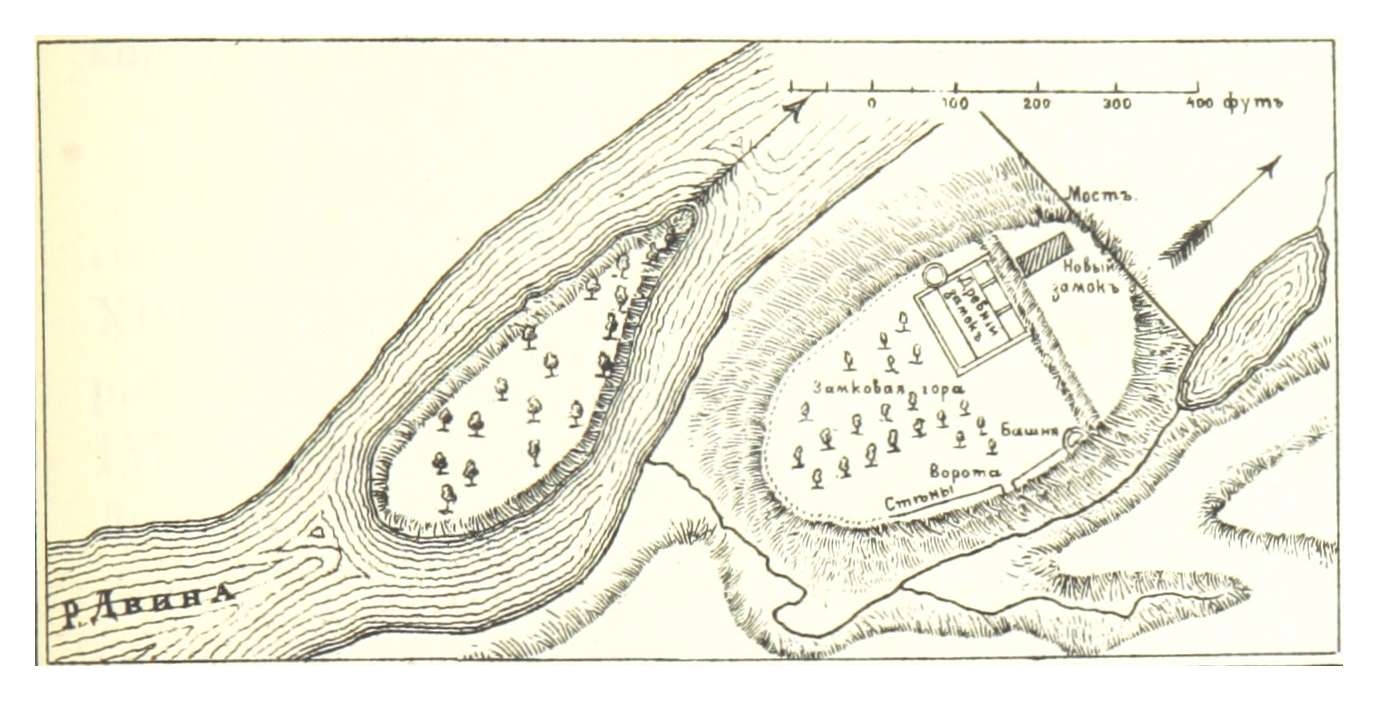
Sketch of Lennewarden Castle (ca 1880)

- Lielvārde Castle
