= Lielvārde Parish =

Parish in Ogre Municipality, Latvia

- parish of Latvia
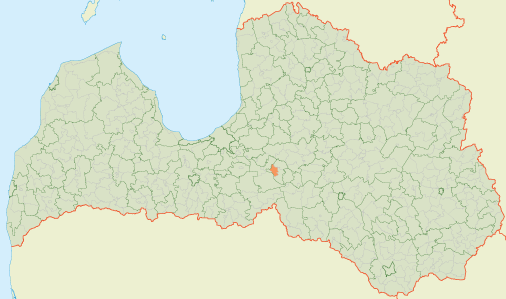
- Coordinates: 56°43′05″N 24°54′10″E
- Country: Latvia

Population (1 January 2026)
  - Total: 862

Lielvārde Parish (Latvian: Lielvārdes pagasts) is an administrative unit of Ogre Municipality in the Vidzeme region of Latvia. It was created in 2010 from the countryside territory of Lielvārde town. The center of the parish is the town of Lielvārde, which is located outside the borders of Lielvārde parish.

At the beginning of 2014, the population of the parish was 1033.

== Villages and settlements of Lielvārde Parish ==
- Annas
- Glaudītāji
- Kaibala
- Senči
- Svētiņi
