= Ikšķile =

Town in Ogre Municipality, Latvia

- Town
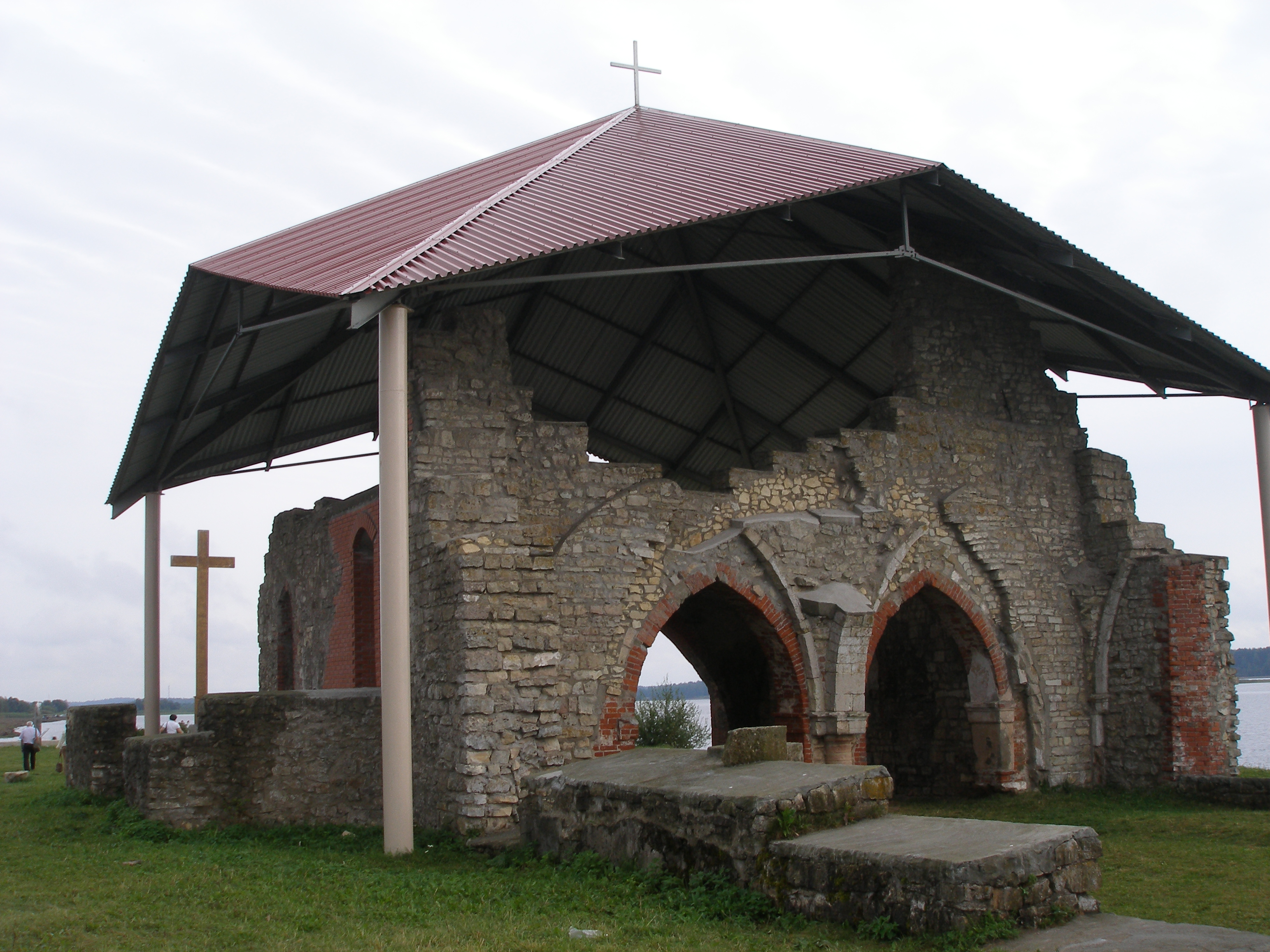

- Flag Coat of arms

- Location in Latvia
- Coordinates: 56°50′12″N 24°29′47″E
- Country: Latvia
- Municipality: Ogre Municipality
- Town rights: 1992

Government
  - Head of Administration: Aiva Ormane

Area
  - Total: 5.12 km^{2} (1.98 sq mi)
- Elevation: 20 m (66 ft)

Population (2021)
  - Total: 7,278
  - Density: 1,420/km^{2} (3,680/sq mi)
- Time zone: UTC+2 (EET)
  - Summer (DST): UTC+3 (EEST)
- Postal code: LV-5052
- Calling code: +371 650
- Number of city council members: 15
- Website: www.ikskile.lv

Ikšķile (Latvian pronunciation: [ˈikʃcile],; German: Uexküll, or Üxküll; Swedish: Yxkull; Livonian: Ikškilā) is a town in Ogre Municipality, in the Vidzeme region of Latvia. Located on the right bank of the Daugava River, it is 28 kilometers from the capital city of Riga and 7 kilometers from Ogre. The town is intersected by the A6 highway and the Riga–Daugavpils railway line. It was the first capital of the Roman Catholic Bishopric of Livonia and is home to the oldest stone building in the Eastern Baltic.

== Etymology ==
According to Urmas Sutrop's recent research into the toponym's origin, the name Ikšķile is from a Livonian term meaning 'the ford or islet(s) (i.e., a place on the Daugava River where it was possible to cross the river) belonging to the son of the (local ruler) Ike'. The personal name Ike has the honourable meaning 'age, lifetime'; the Ike family had considerable power in Livonia, as they controlled the military and trade traffic across the Daugava at Ykescola/Ykescole. The earlier idea that the placename Ikšķile translates from the Finnic Livonian words ikš-ķile (ikš = 'one', ķile / kīla = village) meaning 'one village' or 'the (one) village', is treated by Sutrop as a folk etymology.

== History ==
Ikšķile is one of the oldest inhabited regions of Latvia. This is evidenced by mounds and ancient burial grounds in the present rural area of Ikšķile. By the 9th to 12th centuries there was already a Liv village on the Daugava waterway.

=== Latvia's First Castle ===
Building and employment of castles was an important topic in the first accounts available in the Livonian Chronicle of Henry. Henry of Livonia, an eyewitness to the events, started telling about a canon of the Augustinian monastery of Segeberg in Holstein called Meinhard. Meinhard heard stories of travelers about the great Daugava river, an area of commerce for pagan tribes of Livs and Letts.

Meinhard ventured there to convert people to Christianity. After some conversions, he built a church in the village of Ikšķile and baptized some Livonians. However, the position of the church was vulnerable to attacks, mainly from Lithuanian pagan inhabitants. After a Lithuanian raiding party attacked in winter, Meinhard and the local people hid in the forests. According to Henry of Livonia's chronicle, Meinhard pointed out that Livonians were foolish for not having fortifications, and promised people to build castles if they converted to Christianity.

In 1185, stonemasons from Gotland built the castle of Ikšķile with a chapel or church. This is the oldest stone castle in Latvia and it is also the oldest stone building in the Eastern Baltic. In 1186, the Archbishop of Bremen appointed Meinhard as the first bishop of Ikšķile. Under his leadership, Ikšķile became the center from which Catholicism would spread in Latvia. Both Meinhard and the second bishop, Berthold of Hanover (a Cistercian abbot of Loccum), were buried inside Ikšķile Church (Bishop Meinhard was later reburied at the Dome Church in Riga).

=== Moving of the Livonian Bishopric Center ===
Albert of Buxhovden followed Berthold as the third bishop. He realized that the diocese, defended by a castle with the same name, was too far from the Daugava river mouth to be effective in battle. Thus, in 1201, Albert moved the Livonian Bishopric Center to Riga to establish another fortification near the sea. During the Livonian Crusade, Ikšķile Castle was repeatedly attacked by Semigallian troops from the left bank of the Daugava, and in 1203 and 1206 Prince Vladimir of Polotsk tried to capture it.

In 1638 the municipality of Ikšķile included eight manors, the richest being the Ikšķile and Tīnūžu manors. By the 19th century, there were two manors left: Ikšķile and Berkava. After the formation of Ogre, which originally belonged to the Ikšķile municipality, the parish area was gradually reduced.

The original castle was destroyed in the 17th century, and the oft-rebuilt church was destroyed in 1916 by German artillery. In 1933 a new Lutheran church was erected near the railway station. Ikšķile became an urban-type settlement in 1968, and received full town rights in 1992. Due to the construction of the Riga Hydroelectric Power Plant and its reservoir in the 1970s, the ruins of the castle and manor were flooded, but the ruins of the first stone church were preserved on an artificially raised and fortified island.

== Geography and climate ==
Ikšķile is located on the edge of the Middle Latvian Lowland and the Lower Daugava ancient valley, which narrowed after the creation of the Riga reservoir. The terrain is gently undulating, with the highest points located on the Ogres Kangari esker near Tīnūži, reaching up to 65 meters above sea level at Liepukalni. The southern area near the river remains much lower (12–19 meters).

The town enjoys the mildest winters in the Ogre Municipality (January average diumal temperature is -5.8 °C) and warm summers (July average 17.1 °C). The climate is heavily influenced by Atlantic and Baltic Sea air masses, as well as a specific microclimate created by the large surface area of the Riga reservoir, which softens seasonal temperature contrasts. Annual rainfall is roughly 600 mm, making it drier than other parts of the municipality.

== Demographics ==
Historical population
Year	Pop.	±%
1965	2,145	—
1979	2,691	+25.5%
1989	3,445	+28.0%
2000	3,853	+11.8%
2011	3,806	−1.2%
2021	7,278	+91.2%

Ikšķile has a strong Latvian majority, with over 80% of the population being Latvian and around 15% Russian. The population has grown steadily over the decades, driven by both natural growth and migration due to favorable living conditions. As part of the Riga agglomeration, the town has high daily commuter traffic to the capital, with at least half of the working population and students traveling to Riga daily.

=== Notable people ===
- Aleksis Mierlauks (1866–1943) – Theater director and actor.
- Aleksandrs Bode (1875–1955) – Telegraph and telephone communications specialist.
- Jānis Kuga (1878–1969) – Scenographer, painter, and founder of Latvian stage painting.
- Harijs Marnics (1894–1984) – Baltic-German doctor, physiotherapist, publicist, and author.
- Valdis Villerušs (born 1942) – Graphic artist, art historian, and educator.

== Government ==
Ikšķile's local administration is located at Peldu street 22. Leadership positions have historically included the role of Mayor (such as former mayor Indulis Trapiņš), and currently the Head of Administration (Aiva Ormane).

== Education ==
Ikšķile Secondary School is a Latvian State School, founded in 1966. It is also a Junior Achievement Latvia School.

The origins of the Ikšķile School date back to 1864, when the first parish school was established. The original school building was named Zemturi. About a hundred years later, a new building was constructed near the center of Ikšķile, next to the new A6 highway, opening in 1966. From 1989 to 1990, the school was heavily rebuilt, and in 1990 it officially became the Ikšķile Secondary School.

== Library ==
Ikšķile District Central Library is located on Peldu street 22.

The first library in the vicinity was operational by the beginning of the 19th century. Written records state that in 1852 a Reading Association with 35 members was established. The library was restored in 1946 after the Second World War. A separate children's library section was created in 1974.

== Notable landmarks ==
- Ruins of the Ikšķile Church - The ruins of the oldest stone building in Latvia, located on a small, artificially elevated islet (St. Meinhard Island) in the Riga hydroelectric power station reservoir. Built in 1185, destroyed in 1916. Once a year, when the water level is lowered, visitors can walk to the ruins along a former tree-lined road.
- Ikšķile Lutheran Church - Located at Kalēju street 1. Built between 1931 and 1933 by architect Kundziņš. During the Soviet era, it was used as a bookstore for the State Library of Latvia.
- Memorial stone - Located opposite the old church ruins. Installed in 1988, it features the name "Ikšķile" in Latvian, Livonian, and German.
- Ikšķile Spiritual Orthodox Church - Built in 1936 near the Orthodox graves.
- Artist J. Kuga's dwelling house - Located at J. Kugas street 11. The home of LMA professor Janis Kuga (1868–1969). It is a local architectural monument intended to be converted into a museum.
- Ikšķile Lutheran Cemetery - Contains a 1926 monument dedicated to the Latvian riflemen killed in WWI, and two gravestones classified as national art monuments.
- Kapāmuru Brothers' Cemetery - Burial place for fallen Russian and German soldiers of WWI, featuring a 1968 monument by sculptor J. Karlova.
- Liepāderu brothers' cemetery - Burial site for soldiers who died in the Battle of Jugla in 1917.
- Natural landmarks - The Turbu grandstand oak (trunk circumference over 7.1 m), Relziķu oak (5.3 m), and Kranciema juniper (1 m).
- Ikšķile open air stage - A cultural-historical site granted monument status in 2008.

== Gallery ==
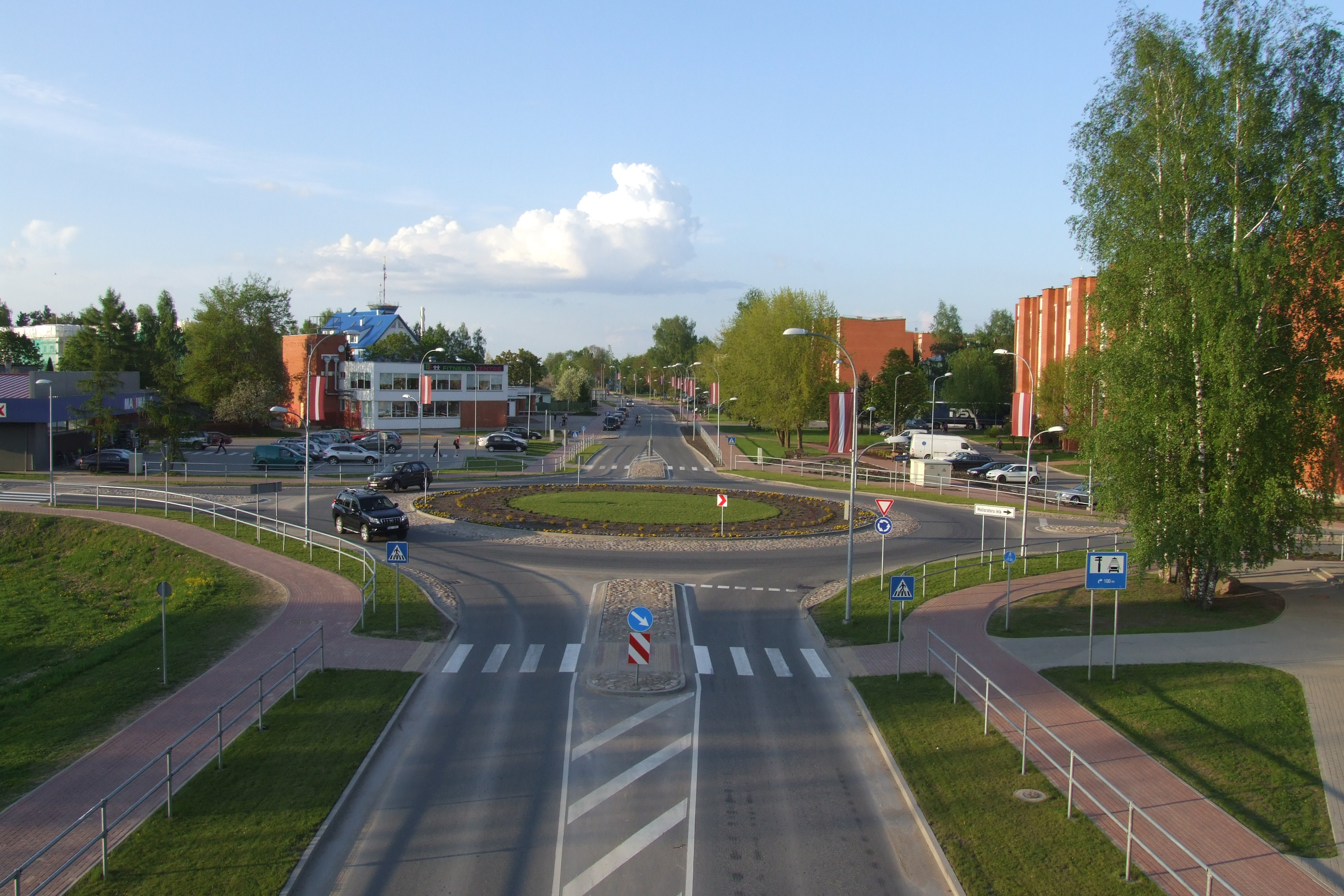
Skolas street in Ikšķile

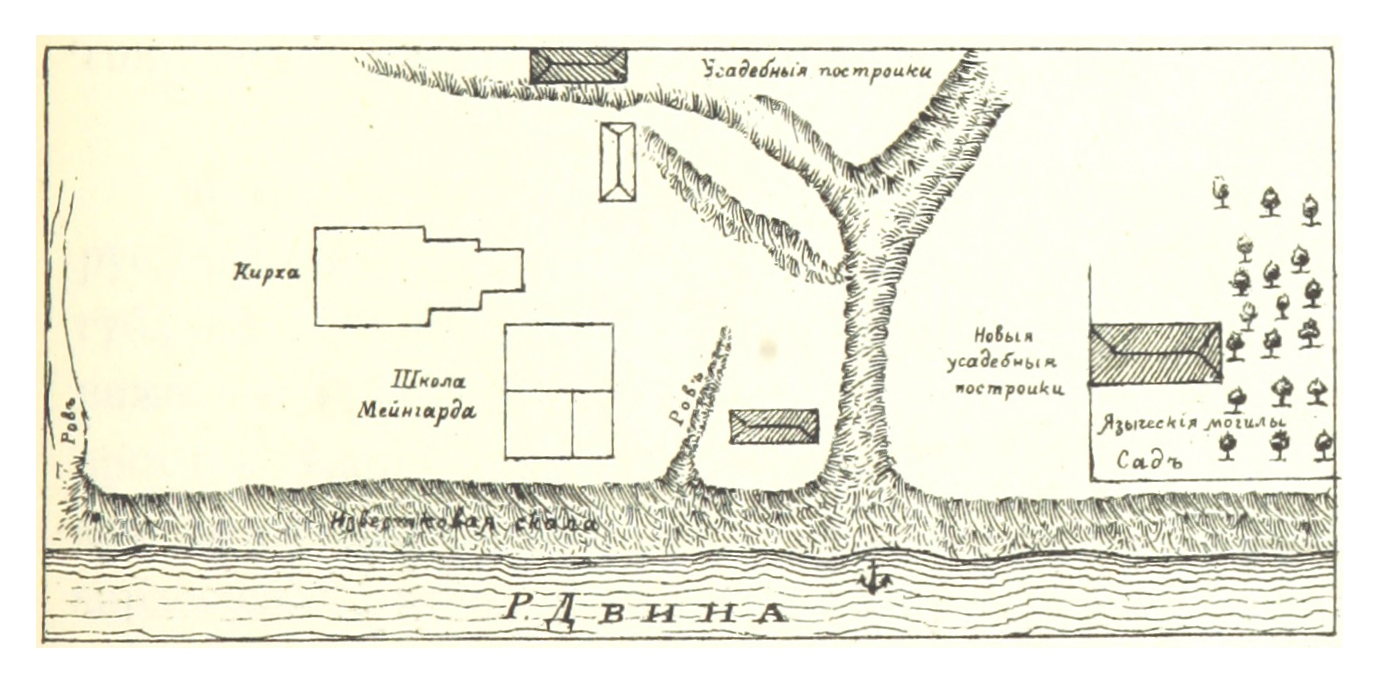
Plan of Ikšķile church, school and Livonian cemetery during the time of Bishop Meinhard (1893 reconstruction attempt)

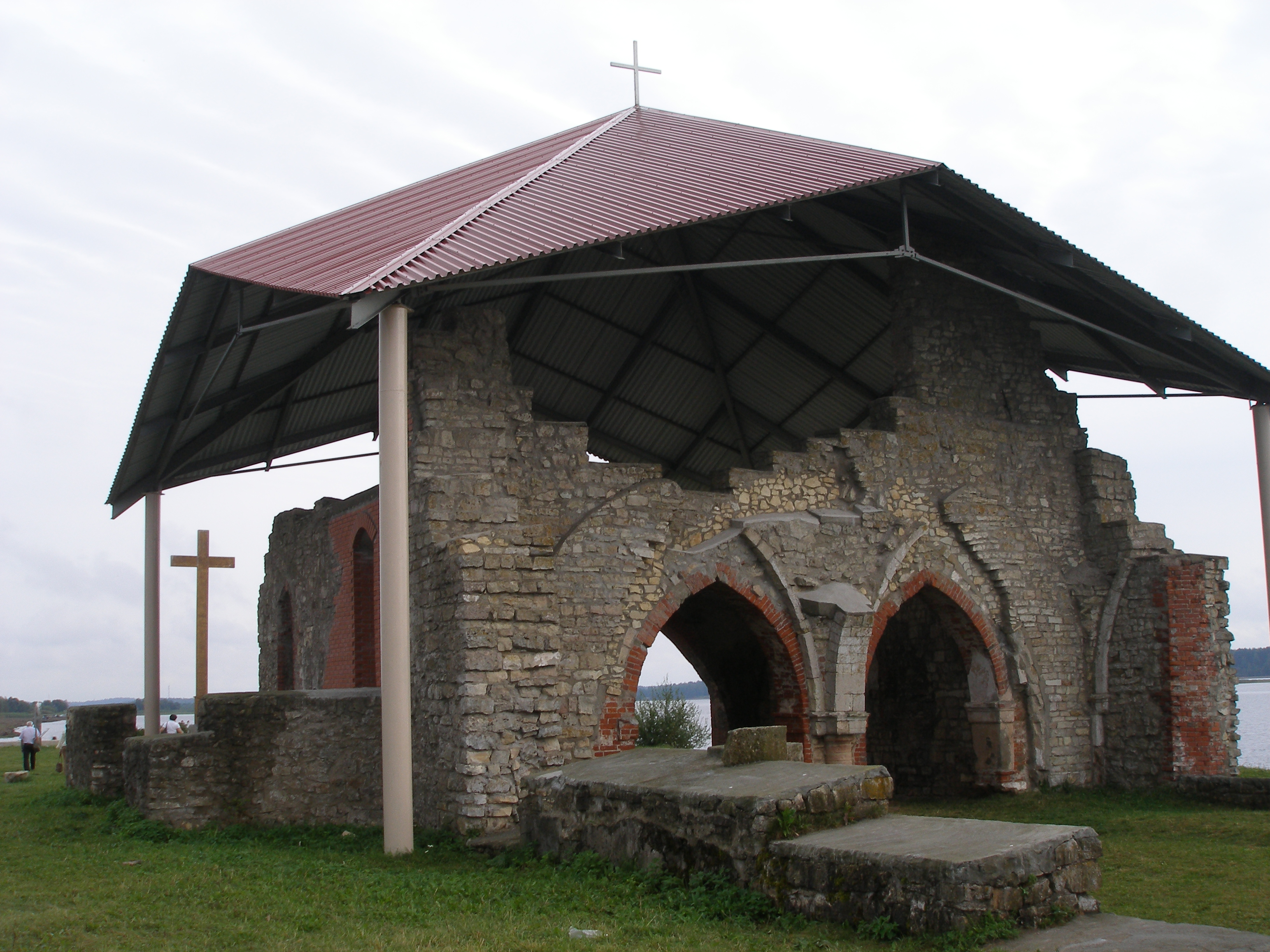
Ruins of the medieval Ikšķile Church

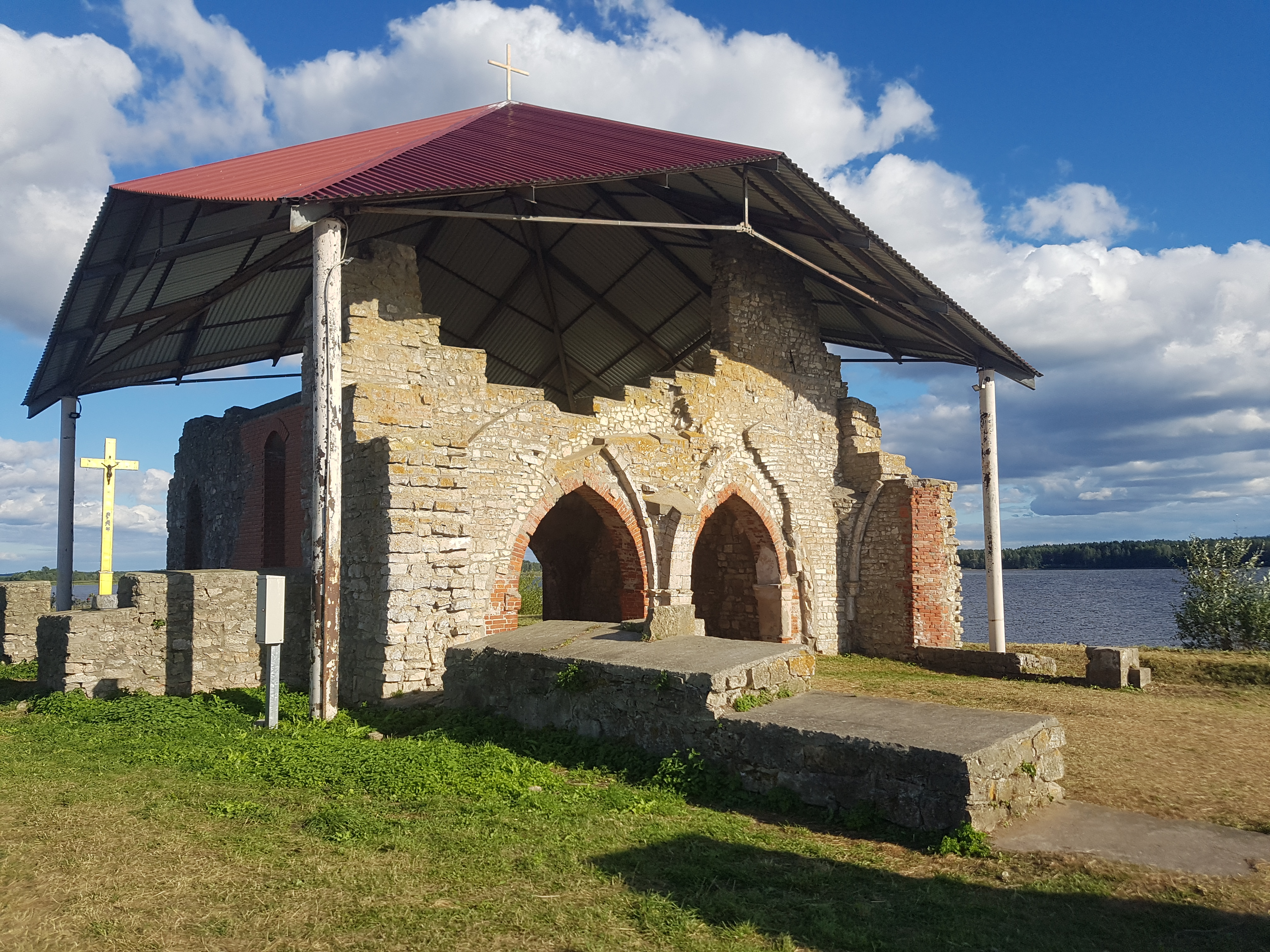
Ikšķile Church ruins on Saint Meinhard Island

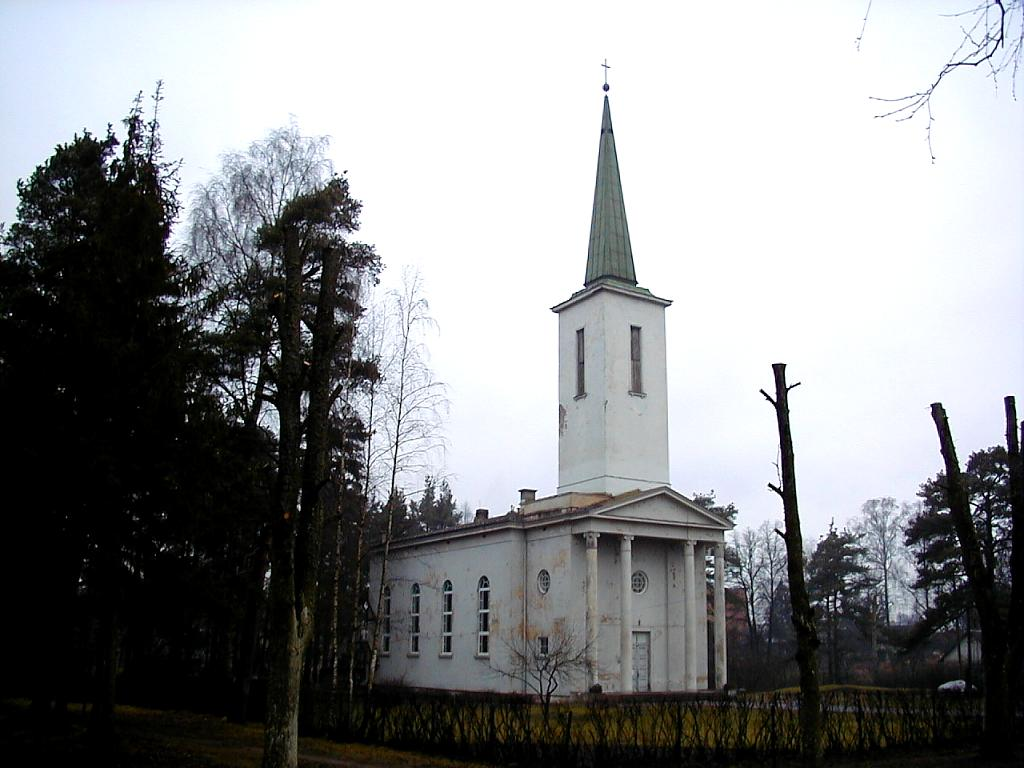
Ikšķile Evangelical Lutheran Church

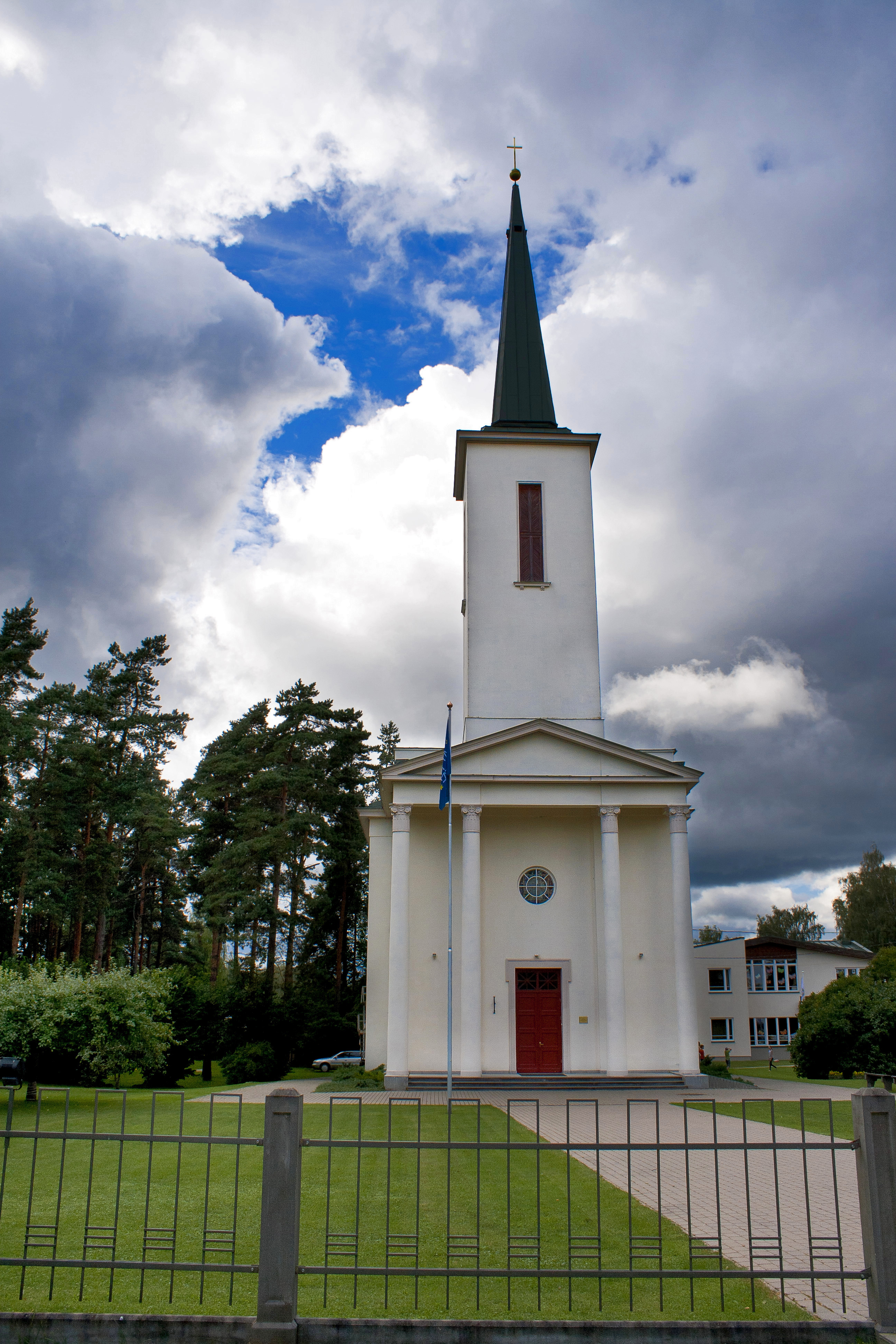
Ikšķile Lutheran Church (alternate view)

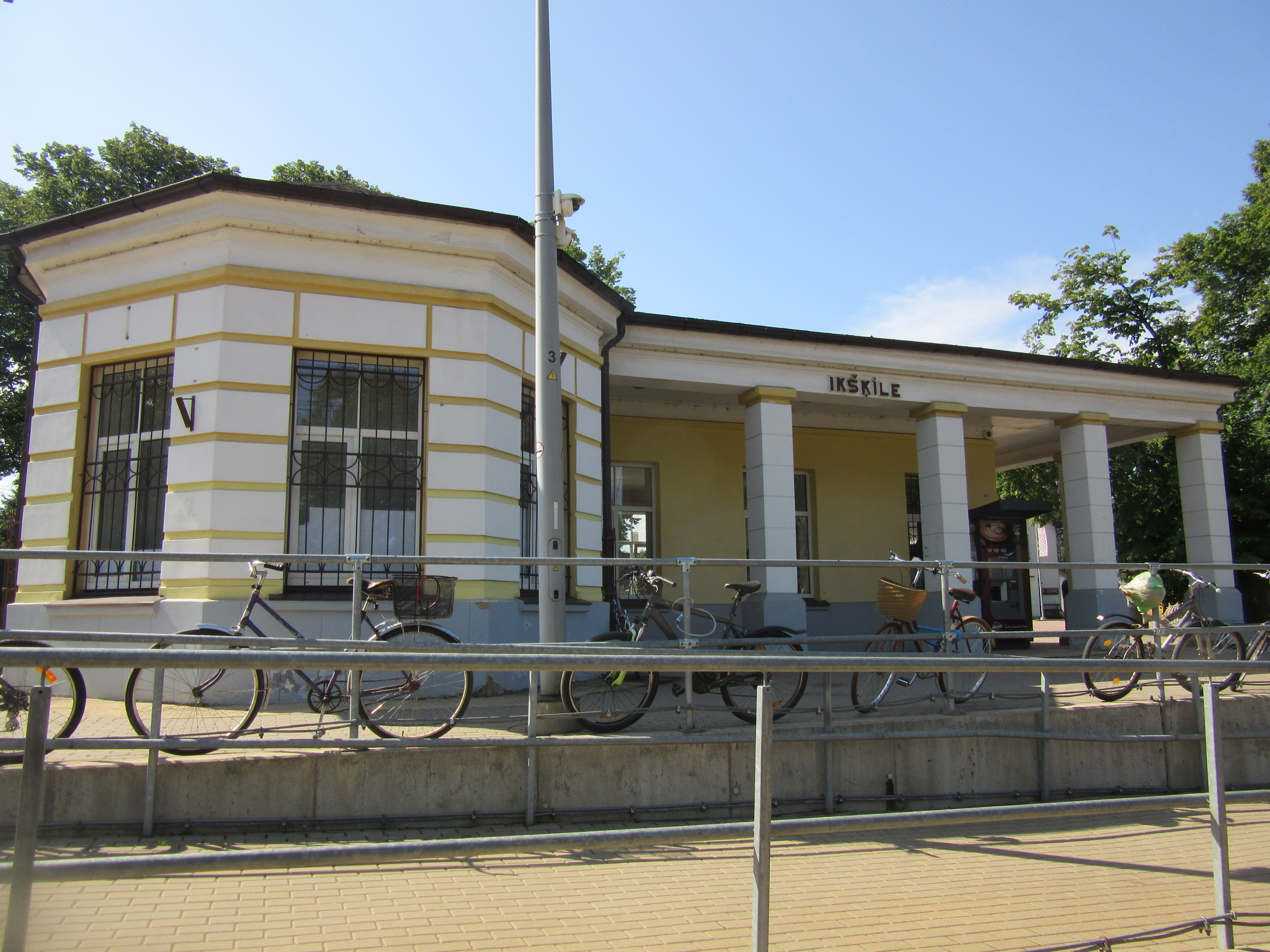
Ikšķile railway station

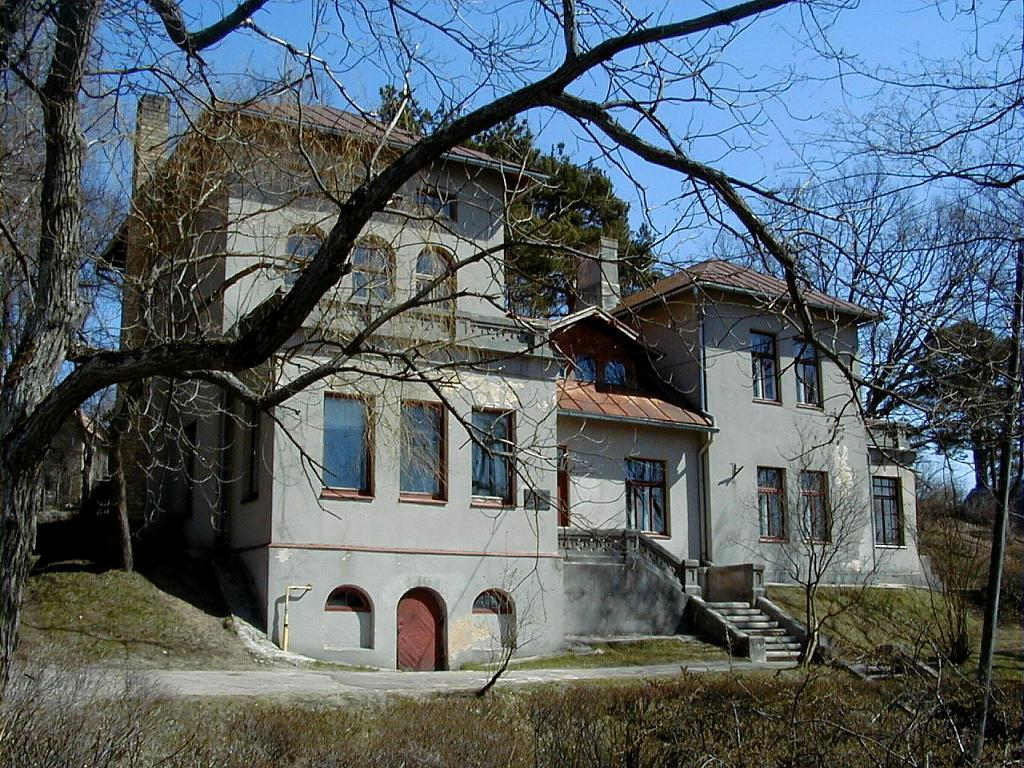
Painter Jānis Kuga's house

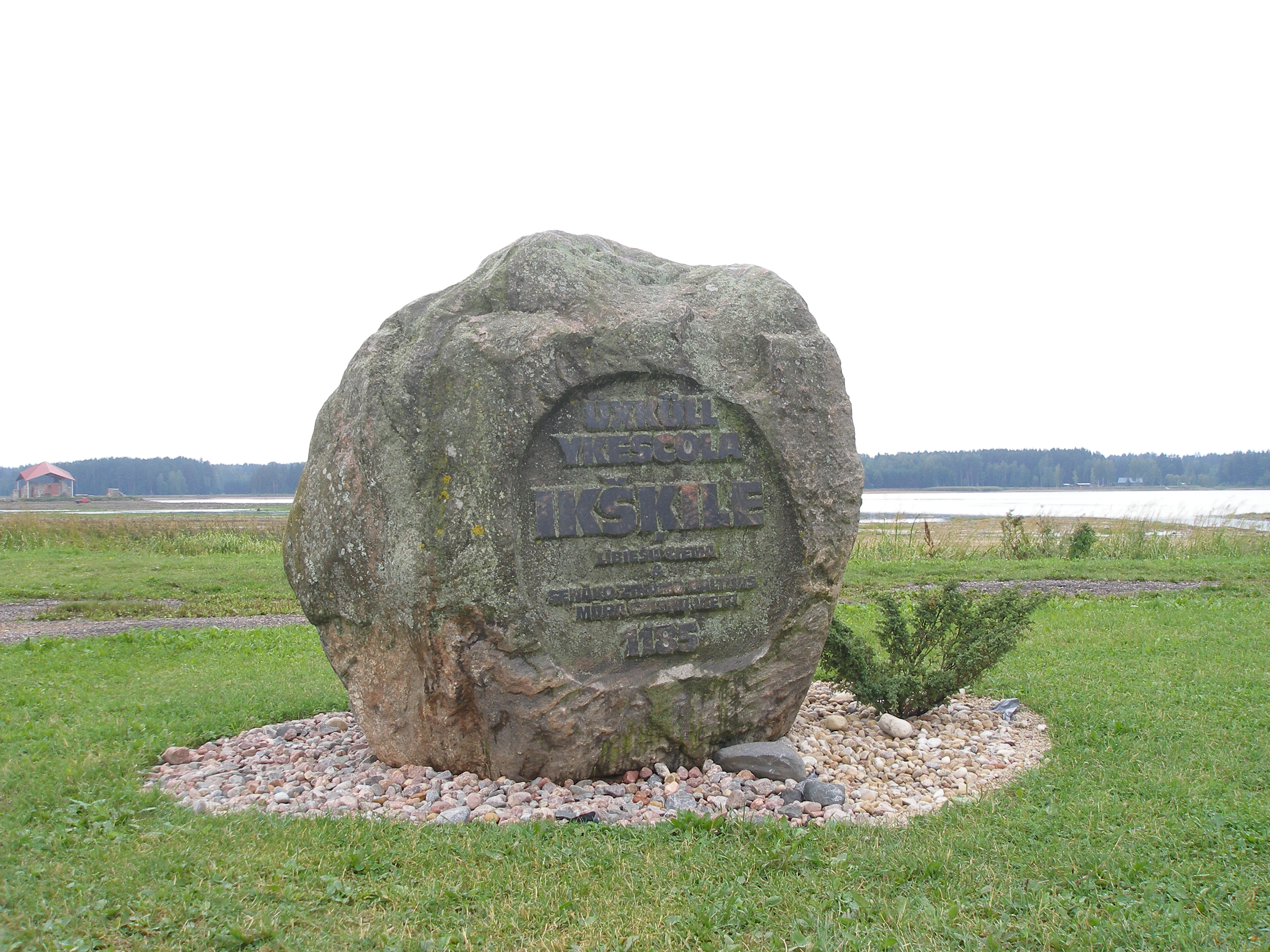
Memorial stone to the first stone building in the Baltics

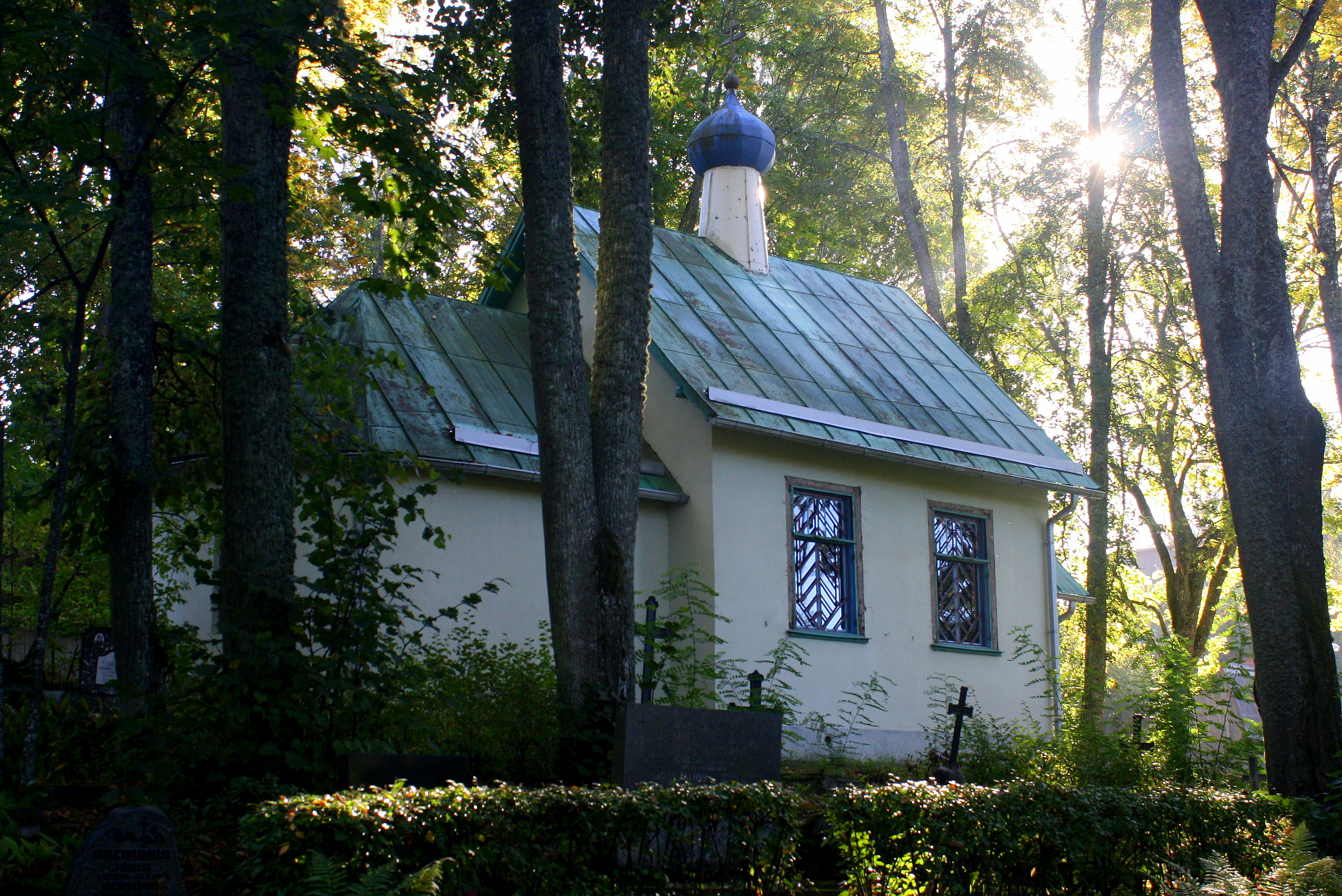
Ikšķile Orthodox Church

== See also ==
- List of cities and towns in Latvia
