= Jumprava Parish =

Parish of Latvia

- parish of Latvia
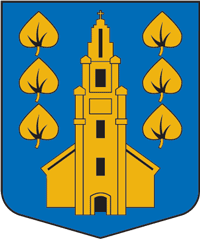
- Coat of arms

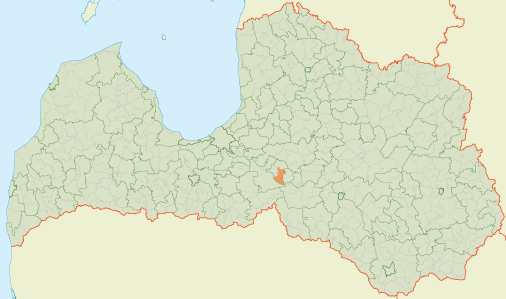
- Coordinates: 56°40′32″N 24°58′21″E
- Country: Latvia

Population (1 January 2026)
  - Total: 1,587
- Time zone: Eastern European Time

Jumprava Parish (Latvian: Jumpravas pagasts) is an administrative unit of Ogre Municipality in the Vidzeme region of Latvia. The administrative center is Jumprava village.

== Towns, villages and settlements of Jumprava parish ==
- Dzelmes
- Jumprava
- Viešļi
