= 2026 Futsal Week Women's June Cup =

Futsal Week Women's June Cup Poreč 2026
Tournament details
- Host country: Croatia
- City: Poreč
- Dates: 15–22 June
- Teams: 8 (from 2 confederations)
- Venue: 1 (in 1 host city)

Final positions
- Champions: Italy (3rd title)
- Runners-up: Croatia
- Third place: Poland
- Fourth place: Czech Republic

Tournament statistics
- Matches played: 16
- Goals scored: 98 (6.13 per match)
- Top scorer(s): (Italy) Renata Adamatti (Italy) Nicoletta Mansueto (6 goals each)
- Best player: (Italy) Nicoletta Mansueto
- Best goalkeeper: (Croatia) Matea Tomkić
- Fair play award: Greenland

The 2026 Futsal Week Women's June Cup was the sixth edition of the Futsal Week Women's June Cup, the annual international futsal championship held in Poreč, Croatia, and organized by Futsal Week for the women's senior national futsal teams.

Poland were the defending champions, having secured their third title at last year's tournament. However, a group-stage loss to hosts Croatia denied them a place in the final, and they eventually finished third. Italy went on to win their third title, equalling Poland's record, following a 3–1 win over Croatia in the final.

== Participating teams ==
A record eight teams participated in the tournament.

All statistics include only the June/Summer editions, excluding February/Winter editions.

Team	Confederation	App.	Previous best performance	WR
Croatia	UEFA	6th	Third place (2019)	35
Czech Republic	UEFA	2nd	Runners-up (2025)	36
Greenland	—N/a	3rd	Fifth place (2025)	NR
Hungary	UEFA	2nd	Fourth place (2022)	23
Italy	UEFA	4th	Champions (2019, 2024)	5
Morocco	CAF	3rd	Third place (2025)	24
Poland	UEFA	6th	Champions (2022, 2023, 2025)	19
Serbia	UEFA	1st	Debut	56

== Squads ==
Italy	Morocco	Czechia	Serbia
1 Ana Sestari (GK); 2 Greta Maretti; 3 Sofia Orrù; 4 Ludovica Coppari; 6 Sara Boutimah; 7 Alessia Grieco; 8 Nicoletta Mansueto; 9 Renata Adamatti; 10 Gaby Vanelli; 11 Alice Virdis; 12 Anthea Polloni; 15 Sara Conticelli; 15 Greta Ghilardi; 16 Melissa Barban; 17 Ilenia Moro; 19 Natasha Barban; 20 Erika Ferrara; 21 Rebecca De Siena; 22 Denise Carturan (GK); Head coach: Francesca Salvatore	1 Kawtar Bentaleb (GK); 3 Noame Boukrim; 4 Zainab Haddani; 5 Jasmine Demraoui; 6 Kenza Allaoui; 7 Siham Tadlaoui; 8 Meryem Hajri; 9 Assia El Atrous; 10 Drissia Korrych; 11 Malak Zaid Al-Kilani; 12 Chaimae Aasem (GK); 13 Amina El Bettach; 14 Amal El Aoufi; 15 Nadia Zaaour; 16 Nouhaila Sedki; 17 Manal Essafir; Head coach: Adil Sayeh	1 Šárka Skřepská (GK); 4 Tereza Lébrová; 6 Gabriela Špičková; 8 Eliška Kretschmann; 9 Natálie Lopatová; 11 Eliška Kremrová; 13 Monika Hlaváčová; 14 Tereza Hrtánková; 15 Adéla Šturmová; 16 Eliška Melounová (GK); 17 Jessica Vargová; 18 Denisa Fedorková; 19 Kristýna Komárková; 21 Tereza Honková; Head coach: Tomáš Štverák	1 Mila Dujović (GK); 3 Dorotea Radovanović; 4 Anđela Mitrović; 6 Sofija Ignjović; 7 Anja Vulikić; 8 Nina Đurđević; 9 Tijana Paunović; 10 Maša Džunić; 11 Jovana Brusin; 12 Aleksandra Damljanović (GK); 12 Marta Damjanović (GK); 14 Mina Maksimović; 16 Jovana Lukić; 17 Elena Stević; 20 Barbara Izgarević; 22 Jovana Janković; Head coach: Dejan Majes
Poland	Hungary	Croatia	Greenland
1 Andżelika Dąbek (GK); 2 Dobrosława Skorupska; 3 Anna Chóras; 5 Weronika Górecka; 6 Zuzanna Maronde; 7 Julia Sieczka; 8 Julia Szostak; 9 Maja Fal; 10 Klaudia Kubaszek; 11 Izabela Tracz; 12 Natalia Majewska (GK); 13 Katarzyna Włodarczyk; 14 Natalia Matuszewska; 15 Klaudia Dymińska; Head coach: Wojciech Weiss	1 Lilla Torma (GK); 2 Zsófia Gáll; 3 Dalma Wiesner; 4 Petra Pintér; 5 Noémi Csikó; 6 Dóra Sárosi; 7 Csilla Krascsencsics; 8 Gréta Kiss; 9 Anikó Nagy; 10 Gabriella Kóta; 11 Viktória Horváth; 12 Vanda Deczki (GK); 13 Krisztina Ács; 14 Bernadett Szabó; 15 Flóra Gajzágó; 16 Noémi Németh (GK); Head coach: Tamás Frank	1 Matea Tomkić (GK); 4 Buga Slavica; 5 Lea Zdunić; 6 Lara Lucić; 7 Nika Petarić; 8 Lea Kolčić; 9 Tomislava Matijević; 10 Izabela Lojna; 12 Iva Bačić (GK); 14 Štefani Tomić; 15 Mara Stančić; 19 Lotta Rendulić; 20 Maja Lena Bičanić; 22 Laura Kopić; 23 Sara Skendrović (GK); Marija Žagar; Head coach: Tihana Nemčić	1 Arnaalunnguaq Møller (GK); 2 Nivi J. Thyssen; 4 Freja Frederiksen; 5 Laila Platou; 6 Nunni Brønlund; 7 Mikkala Tobiassen; 8 Rina Lynge; 9 Emma Thomsen; 10 Aviaana Maratse; 11 Niviaq Skifte Knudsen; 12 Nadia Lundblad (GK); 13 Kristine Nielsen; 14 Arnaq Bourup Egede; 16 Olga Mikaelsen; 20 Karo Dahl; 22 Nukaaka Lynge; Head coach: Ole Martinsen

== Referees ==
Twenty-three referees were appointed for the tournament.

- (Bosnia and Herzegovina) Ena Dulić
- (Croatia) Stjepan Harastija
- (Croatia) Dino Kramar
- (Croatia) Lucija Maretić
- (Croatia) Marijana Orešić
- (Croatia) Tihana Šuper
- (Croatia) Mario Vecko
- (Croatia) Mateo Videc
- (Czech Republic) Věra Soukupová
- (Italy) Davide Copat
- (Montenegro) Dragan Vukčević
- (Slovenia) Nejc Duščak
- (Slovenia) Semir Keserović

=== Referee Observers ===
- (Belgium) Perry Gautier
- (Croatia) Ivan Novak
- (Slovenia) Silvo Borošak
- (Spain) Pedro Galán

== Group phase ==
=== Group A ===
Pos	Team	Pld	W	D	L	GF	GA	GD	Pts	Qualification
1	Italy	3	3	0	0	31	2	+29	9	Final
2	Czech Republic	3	2	0	1	14	8	+6	6	Match for third place
3	Morocco	3	1	0	2	7	12	−5	3	Match for fifth place
4	Serbia	3	0	0	3	3	33	−30	0	Match for seventh place

Source: FutsalPlanet
Rules for classification: 1) Points; 2) head-to-head matches; 3) Goal difference; 4) Number of goals scored.
16 June 2026
10:00

Italy	19–1	Serbia
Ludovica Coppari 1', 2'; Erika Ferrara 5', 11'; Rebecca De Siena 6'; Gabrielly Vanelli 13'; Sara Boutimah 15', 23', 37'; Greta Maretti 16'; Alice Virdis 16', 19'; Natasha Barban 18'; Renata Adamatti 18', 22', 27'; Jovana Lukić 20' (o.g.); Nicoletta Mansueto 27'; Jovana Brusin 29' (o.g.)	Report	Nina Đurđević 7'

Športska Dvorana Finida, Poreč
Referee: Marijana Orešić (CRO), Věra Soukupová (CZE)
16 June 2026
12:15

Morocco	1–5	Czech Republic
Manal Essafir 7'	Report	Tereza Honková 6'; Jessica Vargová 9'; Kawtar Bentaleb 10' (o.g.); Tereza Hrtánková 16'; Monika Hlaváčová 27'

Športska Dvorana Finida, Poreč
Referee: Dragan Vukčević (MNE), Ena Dulić (BIH)

17 June 2026
10:00

Serbia	1–8	Czech Republic
Maša Džunić 24'	Report	Monika Hlaváčová 1'; Eliška Kretschmann 7', 28'; Kristýna Komárková 10'; Jessica Vargová 11', 16', 29'; Tereza Lébrová 26'

Športska Dvorana Finida, Poreč
Referee: Mateo Videc (CRO), Nejc Duščak (SLO)
17 June 2026
12:15

Italy	6–0	Morocco
Sara Boutimah 2'; Nicoletta Mansueto 7'; Ludovica Coppari 14'; Alessia Grieco 15'; Meryem Hajri 29' (o.g.); Renata Adamatti 39'	Report

Športska Dvorana Finida, Poreč
Referee: Stjepan Harastija (CRO), Semir Keserović (SLO)

19 June 2026
10:00

Morocco	6–1	Serbia
Siham Tadlaoui 1' (pen.), 22'; Noame Boukrim 6', 40'; Drissia Korrych 10'; Jasmine Demraoui 17'		Jovana Brusin 11' (2pen.)

Športska Dvorana Finida, Poreč
Referee: Dino Kramar (CRO), Mario Vecko (CRO)
19 June 2026
12:15

Czech Republic	1–6	Italy
Gabriela Špičková 32'	Report	Nicoletta Mansueto 6', 17'; Erika Ferrara 8'; Alessia Grieco 12'; Renata Adamatti 13', 40'

Športska Dvorana Finida, Poreč
Referee: Marijana Orešić (CRO), Lucija Maretić (CRO)

=== Group B ===
Pos	Team	Pld	W	D	L	GF	GA	GD	Pts	Qualification
1	Croatia (H)	3	3	0	0	10	0	+10	9	Final
2	Poland	3	1	1	1	6	3	+3	4	Match for third place
3	Hungary	3	1	1	1	6	4	+2	4	Match for fifth place
4	Greenland	3	0	0	3	2	17	−15	0	Match for seventh place

Source: FutsalPlanet
Rules for classification: 1) Points; 2) head-to-head matches; 3) Goal difference; 4) Number of goals scored.
(H) Hosts
16 June 2026
16:00

Poland	5–1	Greenland
Julia Szostak 5'; Nunni Brønlund 16' (o.g.); Natalia Matuszewska 16'; Izabela Tracz 29'; Katarzyna Włodarczyk 39'	Report	Emma Thomsen 13'

Športska Dvorana Finida, Poreč
Referee: Dino Kramar (CRO), Lucija Maretić (CRO)
16 June 2026
18:15

Hungary	0–2	Croatia
	Report	Mara Stančić 7'; Buga Slavica 22'

Športska Dvorana Finida, Poreč
Referee: Semir Keserović (SLO), Davide Copat (ITA)

17 June 2026
16:00

Greenland	0–7	Croatia
	Report	Buga Slavica 1'; Nika Petarić 3'; Štefani Tomić 20'; Tomislava Matijević 21', 22'; Mara Stančić 23'; Lara Lucić 29'

Športska Dvorana Finida, Poreč
Referee: Věra Soukupová (CZE), Dragan Vukčević (MNE)
17 June 2026
18:15

Poland	1–1	Hungary
Maja Fal 31'	Report	Flóra Gajzágó 14'

Športska Dvorana Finida, Poreč
Referee: Mario Vecko (CRO), Tihana Šuper (CRO)

19 June 2026
16:00

Hungary	5–1	Greenland
Dóra Sárosi 2'; Csilla Krascsencsics 18', 37'; Krisztina Ács 22'; Bernadett Szabó 32'		Laila Platou 18'

Športska Dvorana Finida, Poreč
Referee: Věra Soukupová (CZE), Tihana Šuper (CRO)
19 June 2026
18:15

Croatia	1–0	Poland
Lea Kolčić 24'	Report

Športska Dvorana Finida, Poreč
Referee: Ena Dulić (BIH), Semir Keserović (SLO)

== Placement matches ==
=== Match for seventh place ===
21 June 2026
10:00

Serbia	4–0	Greenland
Tijana Paunović 8', 14'; Anja Vulikić 13', 21'

Športska Dvorana Finida, Poreč
Referee: Davide Copat (ITA), Věra Soukupová (CZE)

=== Match for fifth place ===
21 June 2026
12:15

Morocco	2–4	Hungary
Malak Zaid Al-Kilani 36'; Manal Essafir 38'		Viktória Horváth 7'; Noémi Csikó 17'; Gabriella Kota 24'; Dóra Sárosi 32'

Športska Dvorana Finida, Poreč
Referee: Ena Dulić (BIH), Tihana Šuper (CRO)

=== Match for third place ===
21 June 2026
16:00

Czech Republic	0–5	Poland
	Report	Izabela Tracz 8'; Klaudia Kubaszek 26'; Katarzyna Włodarczyk 34'; Julia Sieczka 35'; Julia Szostak 36'

Športska Dvorana Finida, Poreč
Referee: Marijana Orešić (CRO), Lucija Maretić (CRO)

=== Final ===
21 June 2026
18:15

Italy	3–1	Croatia
Sara Boutimah 22'; Nicoletta Mansueto 25', 40'		Maja Lena Bičanić 30'

Športska Dvorana Finida, Poreč
Referee: Semir Keserović (SLO), Nejc Duščak (SLO)

== Goalscorers ==
There were 98 goals scored in 16 matches, for an average of 6.12 goals per match.

6 goals

- (Italy) Renata Adamatti
- (Italy) Nicoletta Mansueto

5 goals

- (Italy) Sara Boutimah

4 goals

- (Czech Republic) Jessica Vargová

3 goals

- (Italy) Ludovica Coppari
- (Italy) Erika Ferrara

2 goals

- (Croatia) Tomislava Matijević
- (Croatia) Mara Stančić
- (Croatia) Buga Slavica
- (Czech Republic) Monika Hlaváčová
- (Czech Republic) Eliška Kretschmann
- (Hungary) Csilla Krascsencsics
- (Hungary) Dóra Sárosi
- (Italy) Alessia Grieco
- (Italy) Alice Virdis
- (Morocco) Noame Boukrim
- (Morocco) Manal Essafir
- (Morocco) Siham Tadlaoui
- (Poland) Julia Szostak
- (Poland) Izabela Tracz
- (Poland) Katarzyna Włodarczyk
- (Serbia) Tijana Paunović
- (Serbia) Anja Vulikić

1 goal

- (Croatia) Maja Lena Bičanić
- (Croatia) Lea Kolčić
- (Croatia) Lara Lucić
- (Croatia) Nika Petarić
- (Croatia) Štefani Tomić
- (Czech Republic) Tereza Honková
- (Czech Republic) Tereza Hrtánková
- (Czech Republic) Kristýna Komárková
- (Czech Republic) Tereza Lébrová
- (Czech Republic) Gabriela Špičková
- (Greenland) Laila Platou
- (Greenland) Emma Thomsen
- (Hungary) Krisztina Ács
- (Hungary) Noémi Csikó
- (Hungary) Flóra Gajzágó
- (Hungary) Viktória Horváth
- (Hungary) Gabriella Kota
- (Hungary) Bernadett Szabó
- (Italy) Natasha Barban
- (Italy) Rebecca De Siena
- (Italy) Greta Maretti
- (Italy) Gabrielly Vanelli
- (Morocco) Jasmine Demraoui
- (Morocco) Drissia Korrych
- (Morocco) Malak Zaid Al-Kilani
- (Poland) Maja Fal
- (Poland) Klaudia Kubaszek
- (Poland) Natalia Matuszewska
- (Poland) Julia Sieczka
- (Serbia) Jovana Brusin
- (Serbia) Nina Đurđević
- (Serbia) Maša Džunić

1 own goal

- (Greenland) Nunni Brønlund (against Poland)
- (Morocco) Kawtar Bentaleb (against Czechia)
- (Morocco) Meryem Hajri (against Italy)
- (Serbia) Jovana Brusin (against Italy)
- (Serbia) Jovana Lukić (against Italy)

Source: FutsalPlanet
