= 2025 Futsal Week Women's June Cup =

Tournament details
- Host country: Croatia
- City: Poreč
- Dates: 18–22 June
- Teams: 5
- Venue: Finida Hall

Final positions
- Champions: Poland
- Runners-up: Czech Republic
- Third place: Morocco
- Fourth place: Croatia

Tournament statistics
- Top scorer: Eliška Kretschmann (Czech Republic)
- Best player: Klaudia Kubaszek (Poland)
- Best goalkeeper: Andželika Dabek (Poland)
- Fair play award: Greenland

The 2025 Futsal Week Women's June Cup was an international women's futsal tournament hosted by Futsal Week, and held in Poreč, Croatia from 18 to 22 June 2025. Poland won the tournament.

== Teams ==
| Team | Appearance | Previous best performance |
|---|---|---|
| Croatia | 5th | Third place (2019) |
| Czech Republic | 1st | Debut |
| Greenland | 2nd | Sixth place (2024) |
| Morocco | 2nd | Fifth place (2024) |
| Poland | 5th | Champions (2022, 2023) |

== Standings ==
| Pos | Team | Pld | W | D | L | GF | GA | GD | Pts |
|---|---|---|---|---|---|---|---|---|---|
| 1 | Poland (C) | 4 | 3 | 1 | 0 | 11 | 2 | +9 | 10 |
| 2 | Czech Republic | 4 | 2 | 1 | 1 | 13 | 5 | +8 | 7 |
| 3 | Morocco | 4 | 2 | 0 | 2 | 9 | 9 | 0 | 6 |
| 4 | Croatia (H) | 4 | 2 | 0 | 2 | 9 | 7 | +2 | 6 |
| 5 | Greenland | 4 | 0 | 0 | 4 | 4 | 23 | −19 | 0 |

Source: Futsal Planet
(C) Champions; (H) Hosts
18 June 2025
10:15

| Poland | 4–1 | Morocco |
|---|---|---|
| Wiktoria Pietrzyk 16'; Klaudia Kubaszek 19', 33'; Julia Szostak 39' | Report | Jasmine Demraoui 4' |

Finida Hall, Poreč, Croatia
Referee: Alice Vévodová (Czech Republic)
18 June 2025
12:30

| Croatia | 2–1 | Czech Republic |
|---|---|---|
| Tomislava Matijević 23'; Lea Zdunić 29' | Report (FACR); Report (CFF) | Skálová Denisa 15' |

Finida Hall, Poreč, Croatia

19 June 2025
10:15

| Morocco | 3–2 | Croatia |
|---|---|---|
| Jasmine Demraoui 5'; Siham Tadlaoui 14'; Salma Miftah 40' | Report | Tomislava Matijević 20'; Nika Petarić 33' |

Finida Hall, Poreč, Croatia
19 June 2025
12:30

| Greenland | 0–5 | Poland |
|---|---|---|
| | Report | Julia Szostak 11'; Katarzyna Włodarczyk 23'; Nadia Lundblad 23' (o.g.); Klaudia Dymińska 27'; Izabela Tracz 29' |

Finida Hall, Poreč, Croatia
Referee: Jernej Petek (Slovenia)

20 June 2025
10:15

| Croatia | 5–2 | Greenland |
|---|---|---|
| Nika Petarić 10'; Gabrijela Gaiser 11'; Tomislava Matijević 14', 30'; Ivona Pejić 39' | Report | Eldeviq Lykke 29'; Heilman Najaaja 40' |

Finida Hall, Poreč, Croatia
20 June 2025
12:30

| Czech Republic | 3–0 | Morocco |
|---|---|---|
| Kretschmann Eliška 11' (pen.), 15' (pen.), 33' | Report |

Finida Hall, Poreč, Croatia

21 June 2025
10:15

| Greenland | 2–8 | Czech Republic |
|---|---|---|
| | Report | Kretschmann Eliška 6'; Soquessa Clara 15'; Komárková Kristýna 18'; Vargová Jessica 23', 24'; Skálová Denisa 27'; Hlaváčová Monika 35' |

Finida Hall, Poreč, Croatia
21 June 2025
12:30

| Poland | 1–0 | Croatia |
|---|---|---|
| Wiktoria Pietrzyk 14' | Report |

Finida Hall, Poreč, Croatia

18 June 2025
10:15

| Morocco | 5–0 | Greenland |
|---|---|---|
| | Report |

Finida Hall, Poreč, Croatia
18 June 2025
12:30

| Czech Republic | 1–1 | Poland |
|---|---|---|
| Jessica Vargová 32' | Report | Katarzyna Włodarczyk 25' |

Finida Hall, Poreč, Croatia
Referee: Jernej Petek (Slovenia)
