= 2022 CONMEBOL Futsal Evolution League =

Liga Evolucion de Futsal 2022

Tournament details
- Host countries: Paraguay; Brazil
- Dates: Regular season: 31 August – 9 September 2022 (South zone); Finals: TBA
- Teams: 20 (from 1 confederation)
- Venue: 3 (in 3 host cities)

Tournament statistics
- Matches played: 20
- Goals scored: 87 (4.35 per match)

The 2022 CONMEBOL Futsal Evolution League (Spanish: CONMEBOL Liga Evolución Futsal 2022) is the fourth edition of the CONMEBOL Futsal Evolution League, a continental league competition for South American men's national futsal teams. It was held from 31 August to 4 September 2022 in its regular season (south zone) with the north zone and the finals to be held in dates to be confirmed.

Organised by the governing body for South American football, CONMEBOL, as part of its Development Department's Evolution Program, all ten members of the continental confederation took part, with both senior and under 20s national teams participating in the league events.

The league returned after three years of absence due to the effects of the COVID-19 pandemic in South America. As of this edition, the tournament was renamed CONMEBOL Futsal Evolution League instead of South American Futsal League, the name used in the first three editions (2017, 2018 and 2019).

The teams are first divided into two geographically based zones (North and South) to compete in a round robin tournament against other members of their own zone during the regular season; the points earned by both the senior and under 20s teams are combined. The winners of each zone then proceed to face each other in the finals to contest the title.

Brazil are the three-time defending champions.

== Format ==
The league operated under the same format established for the inaugural season.

== Calendar ==
Phase	Dates	Country	City	Event	Zone	
Regular season	9–13 August 2023	Paraguay	Luque	South zone		S
Regular season	TBC	[[|]]		North zone	N	
Finals	TBC	[[|]]		Finals	N	S

== Teams ==
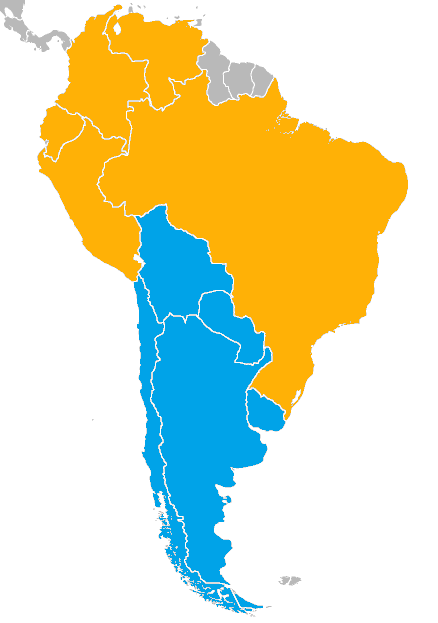
Zone composition of the 2023 CONMEBOL Futsal Evolution League. Nations in the North zone Nations in the South zone Not a member of CONMEBOL

The ten member nations of CONMEBOL entered two teams each: their respective senior and under 20s national teams. In total, 20 teams competed.

The numbers in parentheses show the South American ranking of each team prior to the start of the season (rankings only apply to the senior teams).

=== North zone ===
- Brazil (1st)
- Colombia (4th)
- Ecuador (8th)
- Peru (7th)
- Venezuela (5th)
- Brazil U20s
- Colombia U20s
- Ecuador U20s
- Peru U20s
- Venezuela U20s

=== South zone ===
- Argentina (2nd)
- Bolivia (10th)
- Chile (9th)
- Paraguay (3rd)
- Uruguay (6th)
- Argentina U20s
- Bolivia U20s
- Chile U20s
- Paraguay U20s
- Peru U20s

== South zone ==
The south zone regular season event took place in Luque. Paraguay. All matches were hosted at the Polideportivo of the Parque Olímpico. It was organised in cooperation with the Paraguayan Football Association (APF). Argentina won the South zone title for the second time.

=== Standings ===
==== Overall ====
Pos	Team	Pld	W	D	L	GF	GA	GD	Pts	Qualification
1	Team Argentina	8	7	0	1	25	6	+19	21	Advance to the finals
2	Team Paraguay (H)	8	4	1	3	26	17	+9	13	
3	Team Uruguay	8	4	0	4	12	14	−2	12	
4	Team Bolivia	8	2	2	4	11	23	−12	8	
5	Team Chile	8	1	1	6	13	27	−14	4	

(H) Hosts

==== Senior category ====
Pos	Team	Pld	W	D	L	GF	GA	GD	Pts
1	Uruguay	4	4	0	0	10	4	+6	12
2	Argentina	4	3	0	1	10	4	+6	9
3	Paraguay (H)	4	1	1	2	11	12	−1	4
4	Bolivia	4	1	1	2	9	11	−2	4
5	Chile	4	0	0	4	7	16	−9	0

(H) Hosts

==== Under 20s category ====
Pos	Team	Pld	W	D	L	GF	GA	GD	Pts
1	Argentina U20s	4	4	0	0	15	2	+13	12
2	Paraguay U20s (H)	4	3	0	1	15	5	+10	9
3	Chile U20s	4	1	1	2	6	11	−5	4
4	Bolivia U20s	4	1	1	2	2	12	−10	4
5	Uruguay U20s	4	0	0	4	2	10	−8	0

(H) Hosts

=== Results ===
==== Senior category ====
31 August 2022	Argentina	3–0	Chile
16:00	Alan De Candia 30'; Franco Spellanzon 33'; Nicolás Rosa 35'	CONMEBOL; APF		Referee: Silvio Coronel (Paraguay)

31 August 2022	Paraguay	4–4	Bolivia
20:00	Pedro Pascottini 8'; Diego Poggi 10'; Alcides Giménez 23'; Daniel Ozuna 40'	CONMEBOL; APF	Horacio Miranda 12'; Raúl Ardaya 26', 38'; Luis Florero 33'	Referee: Bill Villalba (Paraguay)

1 September 2022	Bolivia	0–2	Uruguay
16:00		CONMEBOL; APF	Leandro Ataides 10'; Brandon Díaz 17'	Referee: Gustavo Domínguez (Paraguay)

1 September 2022	Paraguay	5–1	Chile
20:00	Juan Gómez Salas 13'; Diego Poggi 18'; Antonio Ozuna 24', 34', 36'	CONMEBOL; APF	Javier Fuentealba 12'	Referee: Carlos Martínez (Paraguay)

2 September 2022	Chile	3–4	Bolivia
16:00	Nicolás Chacón 23'; Felipe Cumsille 25'; Alan Morán 37'	CONMEBOL; APF	José Herrera 2'; Miguel Padilla 7'; Bruno Tecos 18'; Raúl Ardaya 26'	Referee: Feliciano Fariña (Paraguay)

2 September 2022	Uruguay	2–0	Argentina
20:00	Agustín Sosa 20', 37'	CONMEBOL; APF		Referee: Bill Villalba (Paraguay)

3 September 2022	Argentina	2–1	Bolivia
16:00	Dylan Vargas 8'; Lucas Flores 18'	CONMEBOL; APF	Raúl Ardaya 11'	Referee: Adán Villalba (Paraguay)

3 September 2022	Paraguay	1–2	Uruguay
20:00	Alan Rojas 34'	CONMEBOL; APF	Leandro Ataides 24'; José Consentino 37'	Referee: Carlos Martínez (Paraguay)

4 September 2022	Chile	3–4	Uruguay
16:00	Javier Fuentealba 27', 30'; Alan Morán 40'	CONMEBOL; APF	Alejandro Aunchayna 15'; Yhordi Segui 26'; Ignacio Salgues 32', 40'	Referee: Jorge Martínez (Paraguay)

4 September 2022	Paraguay	1–5	Argentina
20:00	Iván González 26'	CONMEBOL; APF	Juan Pablo Cuello 2'; Nicolás Rosa 8'; Alan De Candia 11', 25'; Nicolás Kravetzky 28'	Referee: Bill Villalba (Paraguay)

==== Under 20s category ====
31 August 2022	Argentina U20s	3–1	Chile U20s
14:00	Franco Caruso 20', 33'; Nicolás Rosental 23'	CONMEBOL; APF	Esteban Zúñiga 15'	Referee: Carlos Martínez (Paraguay)

31 August 2022	Paraguay U20s	5–0	Bolivia U20s
18:00	Francisco Torales 6'; Jonatan Franco 8'; Enrique Benítez 24'; Tobías Benítez 25'; Samuel Ferreira 38'	CONMEBOL; APF		Referee: César Cabrera (Paraguay)

1 September 2022	Bolivia U20s	1–0	Uruguay U20s
14:00	Jesús Peterito 4'	CONMEBOL; APF		Referee: Diego Santander (Paraguay)

1 September 2022	Paraguay U20s	6–2	Chile U20s
18:00	Francisco Torales 6', 30'; Óscar Martínez 8'; Jonatán Franco 10'; Tobías Benítez 25'; Fabricio Vera 38'	CONMEBOL; APF	Josué Castillo 13'; Martín Zúñiga 17'	Referee: Silvio Coronel (Paraguay)

2 September 2022	Chile U20s	1–1	Bolivia U20s
14:00	David Ayala 23'	CONMEBOL; APF	Juan Rossel 14'	Referee: Fany Martínez (Paraguay)

2 September 2022	Uruguay U20s	0–4	Argentina U20s
18:00		CONMEBOL; APF	Enzo Báez 2'; Tomás Acevedo 8'; Román Gastaldi 36'; Franco Caruso 40'	Referee: Gustavo Domínguez (Paraguay)

3 September 2022	Argentina U20s	6–0	Bolivia U20s
14:00	Franco Caruso 10', 18'; Nicolás Rosental 22', 38'; Iván Alegre 35'; Tomás Acebedo 37'	CONMEBOL; APF		Referee: Elías Ferreira (Paraguay)

3 September 2022	Paraguay U20s	3–1	Uruguay U20s
18:00	Enrique Benítez 12'; Édgar Peralta 14'; Óscar Martínez 23'	CONMEBOL; APF	Diego Ibáñez 10'	Referee: César Cabrera (Paraguay)

4 September 2022	Chile U20s	2–1	Uruguay U20s
14:00	Esteban Zúñiga 21', 38'	CONMEBOL; APF	Martín Farías 2'	Referee: Diego Caballero (Paraguay)

4 September 2022	Paraguay U20s	1–2	Argentina U20s
18:00	Tobías Benítez 7'	CONMEBOL; APF	Enzo Báez 22'; Nicolás Rosental 22'	Referee: Carlos Martínez (Paraguay)

== North zone ==
The north zone was scheduled to be held in Foz do Iguaçu, Brazil from 5 to 9 July 2023, however, in June 2023, CONMEBOL decided to postpone the event due to calendar issues of the participating teams. No new dates were announced.
