= 2024 CONMEBOL Futsal Evolution League =

CONMEBOL Liga Evolución de Futsal 2024

Tournament details
- Host countries: Chile; Brazil; Paraguay
- Dates: Regular season: 24–28 July 2024 (South Zone); 6–10 November 2024 (North Zone); Finals: 12–13 April 2025
- Teams: 20 teams from 10 countries (from 1 confederation)
- Venue: 3 (in 3 host cities)

Final positions
- Champions: Brazil (5th title)
- Runners-up: Argentina

The 2024 CONMEBOL Futsal Evolution League (Spanish: CONMEBOL Liga Evolución Futsal 2024) is the sixth edition of the CONMEBOL Futsal Evolution League, a continental league competition for South American men's national futsal teams. It was held from 24 July to 10 November 2024 in its regular season (zones round) with the finals being held on 12 and 13 April 2025.

Organised by the governing body for South American football, CONMEBOL, as part of its Development Department's Evolution Program, all ten members of the continental confederation took part, with both senior and under 20s national teams participating in the league events.

The teams are first divided into two geographically based zones (North and South) to compete in a round robin tournament against other members of their own zone during the regular season; the points earned by both the senior (under 25s) and under 20s teams are combined. The winners of each zone then proceed to face each other in the finals to contest the title.

Brazil, four-time defending champions have won the tournament and have become the five-time winners of the league.

== Format ==
The league operated under the same format established for the inaugural season.

== Calendar ==
Phase	Dates	Country	City	Event	Zone	
Regular season	24–28 July 2024	Chile	Los Ángeles	South zone		S
Regular season	6–10 November 2024	Brazil	Fortaleza	North zone	N	
Finals	12–13 April 2025	Paraguay	Luque	Finals	N	S

== Teams ==
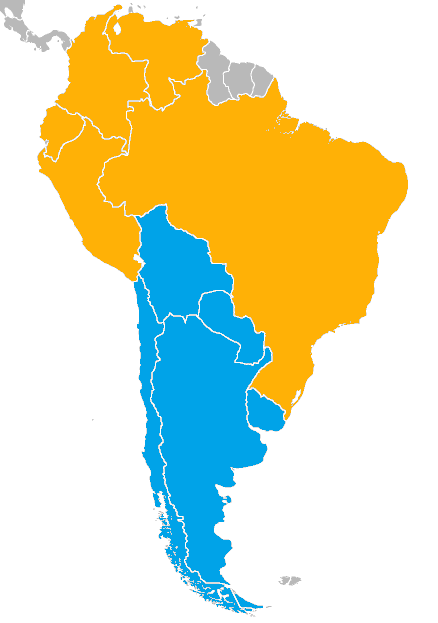
Zone composition of the 2024 CONMEBOL Futsal Evolution League. Nations in the North zone Nations in the South zone Not a member of CONMEBOL

The ten member nations of CONMEBOL entered two teams each: their respective senior and under 20s national teams. In total, 20 teams competed.

The numbers in parentheses show the FIFA Futsal Men's World Ranking of each team prior to the start of the season (rankings only apply to the senior teams).

=== North zone ===
- Brazil (1)
- Colombia (26)
- Ecuador (105)
- Peru (52)
- Venezuela (21)
- Brazil U20s
- Colombia U20s
- Ecuador U20s
- Peru U20s
- Venezuela U20s

=== South zone ===
- Argentina (5)
- Bolivia (108)
- Chile (91)
- Paraguay (13)
- Uruguay (27)
- Argentina U20s
- Bolivia U20s
- Chile U20s
- Paraguay U20s
- Uruguay U20s

== South zone ==
The south zone regular season event took place in Los Ángeles. Chile. All matches were hosted at the Polideportivo de Los Ángeles. It was organised in cooperation with the Football Federation of Chile (FFCh). Argentina won the South zone for the fourth time.

=== Standings ===
==== Overall ====
Pos	Team	Pld	W	D	L	GF	GA	GD	Pts	Qualification
1	Team Argentina	8	6	1	1	28	8	+20	19	Advance to the finals
2	Team Chile (H)	8	6	1	1	21	7	+14	19	
3	Team Uruguay	8	2	3	3	15	14	+1	9	
4	Team Paraguay	8	2	1	5	20	27	−7	7	
5	Team Bolivia	8	1	0	7	8	36	−28	3	

(H) Hosts

==== Senior category ====
Pos	Team	Pld	W	D	L	GF	GA	GD	Pts
1	Chile (H)	4	3	1	0	12	3	+9	10
2	Uruguay	4	2	2	0	11	3	+8	8
3	Argentina	4	2	1	1	8	5	+3	7
4	Paraguay	4	1	0	3	4	14	−10	3
5	Bolivia	4	0	0	4	3	13	−10	0

(H) Hosts

==== Under 20s category ====
Pos	Team	Pld	W	D	L	GF	GA	GD	Pts
1	Argentina	4	4	0	0	20	3	+17	12
2	Chile (H)	4	3	0	1	9	4	+5	9
3	Paraguay	4	1	1	2	16	13	+3	4
4	Bolivia	4	1	0	3	5	23	−18	3
5	Uruguay	4	0	1	3	4	11	−7	1

(H) Hosts

=== Results ===
All match times are local, CLT (UTC−4), as listed by CONMEBOL.

==== Senior category ====
24 July 2024	Argentina	1–1	Uruguay
17:45	Alejo Gayraud 40'	Report	Lucas Paroldo 8'

24 July 2024	Chile	3–0	Bolivia
20:00	Javier Fuentealba 17'; Sebastián Figueroa 25', 30'	Report

25 July 2024	Bolivia	1–2	Paraguay
17:45	Saúl Gareca 30'	CONMEBOL; APF	Pedro Pascottini 28'; Lucas Suárez 33'	Referee: Mario Lagos (Chile)

25 July 2024	Uruguay	0–0	Chile
20:00		Report

26 July 2024	Uruguay	5–2	Bolivia
17:45	Maximiliano Navarro 13'; Nicolás Lamas 14'; Camilo García 19'; Diego Defiore 29'; Saúl Gareca 40' (o.g.)	Report	Saúl Gareca 11'; Jorge Ruiz 24'

26 July 2024	Paraguay	1–2	Argentina
20:00	Alan Rojas 34'	Report	Román Gastaldi 4'; Martín Dorda 15'

27 July 2024	Argentina	3–0	Bolivia
17:45	Juan Saldivia 6'; Gabriel Ramírez 12'; Facundo Fontanella 39'	Report

27 July 2024	Chile	6–1	Paraguay
20:00	Javier Fuentealba 10', 16', 23', 40'; Sebastián Figueroa 34'; Bernardo Araya 35'	Report	Pedro Pascottini 12'

28 July 2024	Paraguay	0–5	Uruguay
17:45		Report	Nicolás Martínez 4', 29'; Mathias Fernández 33'; Brandon Díaz 39', 40'

28 July 2024	Chile	3–2	Argentina
20:00	Cristian Arredondo 9'; Javier Fuentealba 15', 29'	Report	Román Gastaldi 5'; Facundo Fontanella 25'

==== Under 20s category ====
24 July 2024	Argentina U20s	2–0	Uruguay U20s
9:45	Matías Soñer 4'; Ulises Silguero 36'	Report

24 July 2024	Chile U20s	2–0	Bolivia U20s
12:00	Juan Hartard 23'; Sergio Rogel 28'	Report

25 July 2024	Bolivia U20s	3–8	Paraguay U20s
9:45	Jairo Díaz 18'; Fabiño Marañón 28'; César Soliz 32'	CONMEBOL; APF	Robert Gamarra 6', 18', 25'; Martín Aranda 7'; Luciano Luraghi 10', 18'; Fabricio Vera 34', 40'	Referee: Carlos Carrasco (Chile)

25 July 2024	Uruguay U20s	0–4	Chile U20s
12:00		Report	Benjamín Barahona 9'; Jeremi Vargas 24'; Sebastián Olave 32'; Sergio Roge 32'

26 July 2024	Uruguay U20s	1–2	Bolivia U20s
9:45	Mateo Silva 14'	Report	César Soliz 6'; Jairo Díaz 25'

26 July 2024	Paraguay U20s	3–4	Argentina U20s
12:00	Luciano Luraghi 3', 18'; Fabrizio Pedrozo 13'	Report	Iván Monteros 4'; Matías Soñer 18'; Santino Oilhaborda 23'; Bautista Casco 32'

27 July 2024	Argentina U20s	12–0	Bolivia U20s
9:45	Rodrigo Álvarez 7', 13'; Iván Monteros 8', 23'; Matías Soñer 17'; Ulises Silguero 27', 30', 33'; Santiago Rodgers 28', 33'; Bautista Caso 31'; Santino Oilhaborda 34'	Report	Luis Arrua 11', 15'

27 July 2024	Chile U20s	3–2	Paraguay U20s
12:00	Sergio Rogel 17', 19'; Martín Durán 36'	Report	Fabrizio Pedrozo 31'; Mauricio Silva 31'

28 July 2024	Paraguay U20s	3–3	Uruguay U20s
9:45	Robert Gamarra 7'; Luciano Luraghi 37'; Mauricio Silva 39'	Report	Rodrigo Maciel 33'; Juan Ignacio Lista 40', 40'

28 July 2024	Chile U20s	0–2	Argentina U20s
12:00		Report	Lucas Granda 5'; Iván Monteros 8'

== North zone ==
The north zone regular season event took place in Fortaleza, Brazil. All matches were hosted at the Centro de Formação Olímpica. It was organised in cooperation with the Brazilian Football Confederation (CBF).

=== Standings ===
==== Overall ====
Pos	Team	Pld	W	D	L	GF	GA	GD	Pts	Qualification
1	Team Brazil (H)	8	6	2	0	39	10	+29	20	Advance to the finals
2	Team Colombia	8	4	3	1	21	8	+13	15	
3	Team Venezuela	8	4	2	2	15	20	−5	14	
4	Team Peru	8	1	1	6	18	38	−20	4	
5	Team Ecuador	8	1	0	7	11	28	−17	3	

(H) Hosts

==== Senior category ====
Pos	Team	Pld	W	D	L	GF	GA	GD	Pts
1	Brazil (H)	4	3	1	0	26	5	+21	10
2	Colombia	4	2	1	1	9	4	+5	7
3	Venezuela	4	2	1	1	7	12	−5	7
4	Peru	4	1	1	2	9	20	−11	4
5	Ecuador	4	0	0	4	4	14	−10	0

(H) Hosts

==== Under 20s category ====
Pos	Team	Pld	W	D	L	GF	GA	GD	Pts
1	Brazil (H)	4	3	1	0	13	5	+8	10
2	Colombia	4	2	2	0	12	4	+8	8
3	Venezuela	4	2	1	1	8	8	0	7
4	Ecuador	4	1	0	3	7	14	−7	3
5	Peru	4	0	0	4	9	18	−9	0

(H) Hosts

=== Results ===
All match times are local times, BRT (UTC-3), as listed by CONMEBOL.

==== Senior category ====
6 November 2024	Colombia	5-1	Peru
16:00

6 November 2024	Brazil	6-1	Ecuador
20:30

7 November 2024	Venezuela	2-0	Ecuador
16:00

7 November 2024	Peru	1-9	Brazil
20:30

8 November 2024	Ecuador	3-4	Peru
16:00

8 November 2024	Colombia	0-1	Venezuela
20:30

9 November 2024	Ecuador	0-2	Colombia
16:00

9 November 2024	Venezuela	1-9	Brazil
20:30

10 November 2024	Peru	3-3	Venezuela
16:00

10 November 2024	Brazil	2-2	Colombia
20:30

==== Under 20s category ====
6 November 2024	Colombia U20s	5-2	Peru U20s
14:00

6 November 2024	Brazil U20s	5-1	Ecuador U20s
18:15

7 November 2024	Venezuela U20s	2-1	Ecuador U20s
14:00

7 November 2024	Peru U20s	1-3	Brazil U20s
18:15

8 November 2024	Ecuador U20s	5-2	Peru U20s
14:00

8 November 2024	Colombia U20s	0-0	Venezuela U20s
18:15

9 November 2024	Ecuador U20s	0-5	Colombia U20s
14:00

9 November 2024	Venezuela U20s	1-3	Brazil U20s
18:15

10 November 2024	Peru U20s	4-5	Venezuela U20s
14:00

10 November 2024	Brazil U20s	2-2	Colombia U20s
18:15

== Finals ==
The finals were held in Luque, Paraguay. All matches were played at Arena COL.

=== Overall ===
Pos	Team	Pld	W	D	L	GF	GA	GD	Pts
1	Team Brazil	4	4	0	0	16	4	+12	12
2	Team Argentina	4	0	0	4	4	16	−12	0

Updated to match(es) played on unknown. Source:

=== Results ===
==== Senior category ====
12 April 2025	Argentina	1-3	Brazil

13 April 2025	Argentina	0-6	Brazil

==== Under 20s category ====
12 April 2025	Argentina U20s	1-2	Brazil U20s

13 April 2025	Argentina U20s	2-5	Brazil U20s

== See also ==
- 2024 CONMEBOL Beach Soccer Evolution League
