= CONMEBOL Futsal Evolution League =

South American futsal league competition

- Organising body: CONMEBOL
- Founded: 2017; 9 years ago
- Confederation: CONMEBOL (South America)
- Conferences: North zone South zone
- Number of clubs: 20 from 10 countries
- Current champions: Brazil (5th title) (2024)
- Most championships: Brazil (5 titles)
- Broadcaster(s): YouTube (CONMEBOL channel)
- Current: 2024 CONMEBOL Futsal Evolution League

The CONMEBOL Futsal Evolution League, named natively in Spanish as the CONMEBOL Liga Evolución Futsal and formerly named as South American Futsal League, is a continental league competition for South American men's national futsal teams.

The competition is organized by the governing body for South American football, CONMEBOL, who launched the league in 2017 as part of its Development Department's Evolution Program. The first three editions (2017, 2018 and 2019) were played under the name South American Futsal League, and from 2022 it adopted its current name. All ten members of the continental confederation take part in the league, with both senior and under 20s teams representing each nation; therefore, a total of 20 teams participate.

The league consists of two phases: the regular season and the finals. The teams are first divided into two geographically based conferences, the North zone and South zone, to compete in a round robin tournament against the other members of their own zone during the regular season. The winners of each zone then proceed to face each other in the finals to contest the league title.

Brazil are the five-time current champions.

== Competition structure ==
The league operates under the following format:

=== Zones & teams ===
- The ten member nations of CONMEBOL have been split into two conferences based on their geographic location in South America: a North zone and a South zone, comprising five nations each.
- Each nation is represented by two teams: their senior national team and their under 20s national team. Therefore, a total of 20 teams take part.

=== Regular season ===
- During the regular season, each zone hosts its own tournament involving all five nations of said zone, taking place in one of the five countries of the zone in question over the course of five days.
- The fixtures are split into two categories of matches; a set of matches contested between the senior representative teams and a set of matches contested between the Under 20s teams.
- Teams compete in a round robin format exclusively against the other four teams in their own category.
- Points earned by the nations in both the senior and the under 20s matches are combined into one single cumulative table.
- The nation top of the table with the most points after all matches are completed are deemed zone champions; the winning nations of each zone event proceed to the finals.

=== Finals ===
- In the finals, the North zone champion faces the South zone champion; their senior teams play each other over two legs, as do their under 20s representatives for a total of four matches.
- The event takes place over two days. The first leg of the senior and under 20s ties take place on day one and the second legs, on day two.
- The nation which accumulates the most points from all four matches combined will be crowned league champions.
- If the teams are level on points after the four matches are complete, a tie-breaking penalty shootout is contested to decide the winners.

== Results ==
The following shows the results of the finals in which the regular season champions of the respective zones play against each other for the league title. The nation that earns the most points from the four matches that comprise the finals, wins the league.

The league did not take place at all in 2020 or 2021 due to the effects of the COVID-19 pandemic in South America.

- North zone champion
- South zone champion

| Season | Host | Result | | | Matches | | |
| Season | Host | Winners | Points | Runners-up | Category | First leg | Second leg |
|---|---|---|---|---|---|---|---|
| 2017 details | Asunción, Paraguay | Brazil | 9 – 3 | Argentina | Under 20s | 6–0 (Argentina) (+3pts Brazil) | 4–3 (Argentina) (+3pts Brazil) |
| 2017 details | Asunción, Paraguay | Brazil | 9 – 3 | Argentina | Senior | 2–1 (Argentina) (+3pts Brazil) | (Brazil) 1–3 (+3pts Argentina) |
| 2018 details | Encarnación, Paraguay | Brazil | 10 – 1 | Paraguay | Under 20s | (Paraguay) 1–5 (+3pts Brazil) | (Paraguay) 1–5 (+3pts Brazil) |
| 2018 details | Encarnación, Paraguay | Brazil | 10 – 1 | Paraguay | Senior | (Paraguay) 3–5 (+3pts Brazil) | (Paraguay) 3–3 (Brazil) (+1pt each) |
| 2019 details | Foz do Iguaçu, Brazil | Brazil | 6 – 0^{[A]} | Colombia | Under 20s | 2–0 (Colombia) (+3pts Brazil) | |
| 2019 details | Foz do Iguaçu, Brazil | Brazil | 6 – 0^{[A]} | Colombia | Senior | 4–2 (Colombia) (+3pts Brazil) | |
| 2022 details | | The north zone champion has not yet been determined^{[B]} | | | Under 20s | | |
| 2022 details | | The north zone champion has not yet been determined^{[B]} | | | Senior | | |
| 2023 details | Luque, Paraguay | Brazil | 7 – 4 | Argentina | Under 20s | (Argentina) 2–6 (+3pts Brazil) | (Brazil) 0–2 (+3pts Argentina) |
| 2023 details | Luque, Paraguay | Brazil | 7 – 4 | Argentina | Senior | (Argentina) 1–1 (Brazil) (+1pt each) | 2–1 (Argentina) (+3pts Brazil) |
| 2024 details | Luque, Paraguay | Brazil | 12 – 0 | Argentina | Under 20s | (Argentina) 1–2 (+3pts Brazil) | 5–2 (Argentina) (+3pts Brazil) |
| 2024 details | Luque, Paraguay | Brazil | 12 – 0 | Argentina | Senior | (Argentina) 1–3 (+3pts Brazil) | 6–0 (Argentina) (+3pts Brazil) |

Notes:

A. The finals of the 2019 edition were not held until 2023 due to the effects of the COVID-19 pandemic in South America and the consequent reorganization of CONMEBOL's competition schedule.
B. While Argentina were the 2022 South Zone champions, the North Zone tournament has not yet taken place.
