= Bilan De La Paz =

Chilean futsal player

Personal information
- Full name: Bilan Cristóbal De La Paz Castillo
- Date of birth: 16 November 1995 (age 30)
- Place of birth: Maipú, Santiago, Chile
- Positions: Defender; winger

Team information
- Current team: Ferro Carril Oeste
- Number: 14

Youth career
- CE Carolina Llona
- 2012: Palestino

College career
Years	Team	Apps	(Gls)
2016–2018	Universidad Central		

Senior career*
Years	Team	Apps	(Gls)
2013–2015	Palestino		
2016	Cobresal		
2017	Colo-Colo		
2017	Everton		
2018	Universidad de Chile		
2019–2022	Newell's Old Boys		
2023–	Ferro Carril Oeste		

International career
2013–2015	Chile U20		
2015–	Chile		
- * Club domestic league appearances and goals

Bilan Cristóbal De La Paz Castillo (born 16 November 1995) is a Chilean futsal player who plays as a defender or winger for Ferro Carril Oeste in the Argentine Primera División and the Chile national team.

== Career ==
Born in Maipú commune, Santiago de Chile, De La Paz stood out as a futsal player at primary school level. In 2012, he joined the Palestino futsal team, winning the league title in 2013 and represented them in the Copa Libertadores. Subsequently, he played for the futsal teams of Cobresal, Colo-Colo and Everton.

At university level, he represented the Universidad Central futsal team, becoming the captain. In 2018, they won the Ligas de Educación Superior (LDES) (college futsal leagues of Chile) after defeating University of Chile.

Also in 2018, he joined the Universidad de Chile futsal team and won both the 2018 Torneo Apertura and the Copa de Campeones against Deportes Melipilla, then the Torneo Clausura champions, qualifying to the 2019 Copa Libertadores.

In 2019, he moved to Argentine and joined Newell's Old Boys, coinciding with his compatriots Bernardo Araya and Renato Martínez-Conde. In the same year, they got the promotion to the Primera B. Subsequently, they got promotion to the Primera División in the 2020 season. In 2021, they lost the Supercopa against San Lorenzo.

In 2023, he switched to Primera División side Ferro Carril Oeste. He renewed with them in 2024.

== International career ==
Since 2013, De La Paz has been a member of the Chile national team, first with the under-20's. At senior level, he has taken part in many tournaments such as the 2015 Copa América, the 2016 FIFA World Cup qualifiers, a tour in Argentina, the 2023 CONMEBOL Evolution League, among others.

He was included in the squad for the 2024 Copa América.

== Personal life ==
De La Paz graduated as a PE teacher at the Universidad Central de Chile.
