= Renato Martínez-Conde =

Chilean futsal player

Personal information
- Full name: Eduardo Renato Martínez-Conde Díaz
- Date of birth: 27 December 1993 (age 32)
- Place of birth: San Fernando, Chile
- Position: Winger

Team information
- Current team: Akaa

College career
Years	Team	Apps	(Gls)
2014–2016	UPLA		

Senior career*
Years	Team	Apps	(Gls)
2015–2017	Santiago Wanderers		
2018	Universidad de Chile		
2019–2022	Newell's Old Boys		
2023	Hebraica		
2024	Ferro Carril Oeste		
2025–	Akaa		

International career
2019–	Chile		
- * Club domestic league appearances and goals

Eduardo Renato Martínez-Conde Díaz (born 27 December 1993), known as Renato Martínez-Conde, is a Chilean futsal player who plays as a winger for Finnish club Akaa in the Futsal-Liiga and the Chile national team.

== Career ==
Born in San Fernando, Chile, Martínez-Conde stood out as a futsal player in the team of Playa Ancha University (UPLA) from Valparaíso. Subsequently, he joined the Santiago Wanderers futsal team, winning the national championship in 2016. In 2018, he switched to Universidad de Chile and won both the Torneo Apertura and the Copa de Campeones against Deportes Melipilla, then the Torneo Clausura champions, qualifying to the 2019 Copa Libertadores. He was awarded as the best futsal player of the season by El Gráfico.

In 2019, he moved to Argentine and joined Newell's Old Boys, coinciding with his compatriots Bernardo Araya and Bilan De La Paz. In the same year, they got the promotion to the Primera B. Subsequently, they got promotion to the Primera División in the 2020 season. In 2021, they lost the Supercopa against San Lorenzo.

In 2023, he switched to Primera División side Hebraica Futsal. The next year, he joined Ferro Carril Oeste, coinciding again with his compatriot Bilan De La Paz and also Nicolás Lagos.

In January 2025, Martínez-Conde moved to Europe and joined Finnish club Akaa in the Futsal-Liiga.

== International career ==
Martínez-Conde made his debut with the Chile national team in 2019. Since then, he has been a permanent member of the squad in tournaments such as the 2022 Copa América, a tour in Argentina, the 2023 CONMEBOL Evolution League, among others.

He was included in the squad for the 2024 Copa América.

== Personal life ==
Martínez-Conde graduated as a PE teacher at the Playa Ancha University.
