= 2024 Futsal Week Women's June Cup =

Tournament details
- Host country: Croatia
- City: Poreč
- Dates: 11 June–16 June
- Teams: 6
- Venue: Finida Hall

Final positions
- Champions: Italy
- Runners-up: Poland
- Third place: Finland
- Fourth place: Croatia

The 2024 Futsal Week Women's June Cup as an international women's futsal tournament organized by Futsal Week and hosted in Poreč, Croatia from 11 June to 16 June 2024. It was held alongside the 2024 Futsal Week June Cup, the men's equivalent for the tournament. Six teams competed in the tournament.

== Teams ==
Team	Appearance	Previous best performance
Croatia	4th	Third place (2019)
Finland	3rd	Runner-up (2022)
Greenland	1st	Debut
Italy	3rd	Champions (2019)
Morocco	1st	Debut
Poland	4th	Champions (2022, 2023)

== Group stage ==
=== Group A ===
Pos	Team	Pld	W	D	L	GF	GA	GD	Pts	Qualification
1	Italy	2	2	0	0	16	2	+14	6	Knockout stage
2	Poland	2	1	0	1	14	4	+10	3	Knockout stage
3	Greenland	2	0	0	2	1	25	−24	0	Fifth place matches

Source: Futsal Planet
11 June 2024
11:45

Greenland	1–12	Poland
Jensen	Report	Jaszyk 2'; Basta 6'; Matuszewska 10', 16'; Szostak 10', 32', 32'; Włodarczyk 11'; Fronczak 18', 31'; Sobkowicz 38', 39'

Finida Hall, Poreč, Croatia
Referee: Nina Nakić (Croatia)

12 June 2024
11:45

Italy	13–0	Greenland

Finida Hall, Poreč, Croatia

13 June 2024
11:45

Italy	3–2	Poland
Ghilardi 26'; Ferrara 36'; Grieco 38'	Report	Kubaszek 16'; Fronczak 35'

Finida Hall, Poreč, Croatia

=== Group B ===
Pos	Team	Pld	W	D	L	GF	GA	GD	Pts	Qualification
1	Finland	2	2	0	0	7	3	+4	6	Knockout stage
2	Croatia	2	1	0	1	5	6	−1	3	Knockout stage
3	Morocco	2	0	0	2	5	7	−2	0	Fifth place matches

Source: Futsal Planet
11 June 2024
16:00

Morocco	2–4	Finland

Finida Hall, Poreč, Croatia

12 June 2024
16:00

Croatia	4–3	Morocco

Finida Hall, Poreč, Croatia

13 June 2024
16:00

Croatia	1–3	Finland

Finida Hall, Poreč, Croatia

== Fifth place matches ==
15 June 2024
11:45

Greenland	4–11	Morocco

Finida Hall, Poreč, Croatia
16 June 2024
11:45

Morocco	7–5	Greenland

Finida Hall, Poreč, Croatia

== Knockout stage ==
=== Semi-finals ===
15 June 2024
16:00

Italy	7–2	Croatia

Finida Hall, Poreč, Croatia
15 June 2024
18:15

Finland	2–4	Poland

Finida Hall, Poreč, Croatia

=== Third place match ===
16 June 2024
16:00

Croatia	0–4	Finland

Finida Hall, Poreč, Croatia

=== Final ===
15 June 2024
18:15

Italy	3–2	Poland
Ghilardi 26'; Ferrara 36'; Grieco 38'	Report	Kubaszek 16'; Fronczak 35'

Finida Hall, Poreč, Croatia

== Broadcasting ==
All matches will be broadcast on the official Futsal Week Facebook page.
