= 2023 CONMEBOL Futsal Evolution League =

Liga Evolucion de Futsal 2023

Tournament details
- Host countries: Bolivia; Brazil; Paraguay
- Dates: Regular season: 9 August – 12 November 2023; Finals: 1–2 June 2024
- Teams: 20 (from 1 confederation)
- Venue: 3 (in 3 host cities)

Final positions
- Champions: Brazil (4th title)
- Runners-up: Paraguay

Tournament statistics
- Matches played: 44
- Goals scored: 225 (5.11 per match)

The 2023 CONMEBOL Futsal Evolution League (Spanish: CONMEBOL Liga Evolución Futsal 2023) was the fifth edition of the CONMEBOL Futsal Evolution League, a continental league competition for South American men's national futsal teams. It was held from 9 August to 12 November 2023 in its regular season (zones round) with the finals being held on 1 and 2 June 2024.

Organised by the governing body for South American football, CONMEBOL, as part of its Development Department's Evolution Program, all ten members of the continental confederation took part, with both senior and under 20s national teams participating in the league events.

The teams are first divided into two geographically based zones (North and South) to compete in a round robin tournament against other members of their own zone during the regular season; the points earned by both the senior and under 20s teams are combined. The winners of each zone then proceed to face each other in the finals to contest the title.

Brazil were the three-time defending champions and successfully retained the title once more, defeating Paraguay in the finals.

== Format ==
The league operated under the same format established for the inaugural season.

== Calendar ==
Phase	Dates	Country	City	Event	Zone	
Regular season	9–13 August 2023	Bolivia	Quillacollo	South zone		S
Regular season	8–12 November 2023	Brazil	Foz do Iguaçu	North zone	N	
Finals	1–2 June 2024	Paraguay	Luque	Finals	N	S

== Teams ==
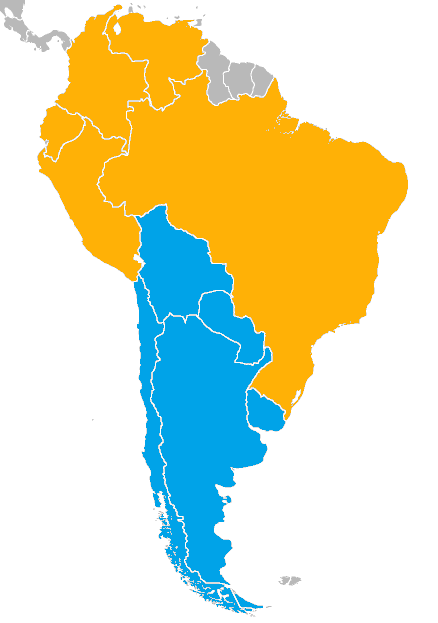
Zone composition of the 2023 CONMEBOL Futsal Evolution League. Nations in the North zone Nations in the South zone Not a member of CONMEBOL

The ten member nations of CONMEBOL entered two teams each: their respective senior and under 20s national teams. In total, 20 teams competed.

The numbers in parentheses show the South American ranking of each team prior to the start of the season (rankings only apply to the senior teams).

=== North zone ===
- Brazil (1st)
- Colombia (4th)
- Ecuador (9th)
- Peru (7th)
- Venezuela (6th)
- Brazil U20s
- Colombia U20s
- Ecuador U20s
- Peru U20s
- Venezuela U20s

=== South zone ===
- Argentina (2nd)
- Bolivia (8th)
- Chile (10th)
- Paraguay (3rd)
- Uruguay (5th)
- Argentina U20s
- Bolivia U20s
- Chile U20s
- Paraguay U20s
- Uruguay U20s

== South zone ==
The south zone regular season event took place in Quillacollo. Bolivia. All matches were hosted at the Coliseo Polideportivo de Quillacollo. It was organised in cooperation with the Bolivian Football Federation (FBF). Argentina won the South zone for the third time.

=== Standings ===
==== Overall ====
Pos	Team	Pld	W	D	L	GF	GA	GD	Pts	Qualification
1	Team Argentina	8	6	2	0	28	9	+19	20	Advance to the finals
2	Team Uruguay	8	5	0	3	24	23	+1	15	
3	Team Paraguay	8	4	1	3	26	25	+1	13	
4	Team Bolivia (H)	8	2	2	4	14	17	−3	8	
5	Team Chile	8	0	1	7	13	31	−18	1	

(H) Hosts

==== Senior category ====
Pos	Team	Pld	W	D	L	GF	GA	GD	Pts
1	Argentina	4	3	1	0	12	4	+8	10
2	Uruguay	4	3	0	1	13	9	+4	9
3	Paraguay	4	2	1	1	11	12	−1	7
4	Bolivia (H)	4	1	0	3	5	8	−3	3
5	Chile	4	0	0	4	7	15	−8	0

(H) Hosts

==== Under 20s category ====
Pos	Team	Pld	W	D	L	GF	GA	GD	Pts
1	Argentina	4	3	1	0	16	5	+11	10
2	Uruguay	4	2	0	2	11	14	−3	6
3	Paraguay	4	2	0	2	15	13	+2	6
4	Bolivia (H)	4	1	2	1	9	9	0	5
5	Chile	4	0	1	3	6	16	−10	1

(H) Hosts

=== Results ===
==== Senior category ====
9 August 2023	Argentina	3–0	Chile
16:00	Kevin Arrieta 5'; Lucas Flores 15'; Pablo Vidal 30'	Report

9 August 2023	Bolivia	0–3	Paraguay
20:00		Report	Alcides Giménez 14'; José Bobadilla 30'; Emerson Méndez 40'

10 August 2023	Chile	4–5	Paraguay
16:00	Renato Martínez-Conde 19', 39'; Bilan De La Paz 23'; Javier Fuentealba 28'	Report	Pedro Pascottini 13'; Alan Rojas 24'; Alcides Giménez 31', 33'; Emerson Méndez 39'

10 August 2023	Uruguay	2–1	Bolivia
20:00	Nicolás Martínez 4'; Brandon Díaz 32'	Report	Carlos Ramos 1'

11 August 2023	Uruguay	4–3	Chile
16:00	Nicolás Ordoqui 16', 40' (pen.); Brandon Díaz 17'; Ignacio Salgues 33'; Emerson Méndez 39'	Report	Nicolás Lagos 30', 40'; Bilan De La Paz 39'

11 August 2023	Paraguay	2–2	Argentina
20:00	Nicolás Lachaga 8'; Pablo Vidal 15'	Report	Alcides Giménez 12'; Iván González 38'

12 August 2023	Argentina	4–1	Uruguay
16:00	Kevin Arrieta 15'; Nicolás Lachaga 17'; Lucas Flores 36'; Thomas Baisel 39'	Report	Brandon Díaz 3'

12 August 2023	Bolivia	3–0	Chile
20:00	Joel Guzmán 9'; Ramiro Mendevil 33'; Bruno Tecos 35'	Report

13 August 2023	Paraguay	1–6	Uruguay
16:00	Emerson Méndez 37'	Report	Nicolás Martínez 4'; Yhordi Segui 6', 10'; Nicolás Ordoqui 20'; Maximiliano Navarro 40'; Ignacio Salgues 40'

13 August 2023	Bolivia	1–3	Argentina
20:00	Roberto Guerrero 15'	Report	Marcos González 25'; Iván Alegre 27'; Pablo Vidal 27'

==== Under 20s category ====
9 August 2023	Argentina U20s	7–1	Chile U20s
14:00	Tomás Acevedo 6'; Iván Alegre 9'; Emanuel Corvalán 9', 23'; Enzo Báez 20'; Lautaro Yañez 30'; Franco Caruso 39'	Report	Iván Maldonado 40'

9 August 2023	Bolivia U20s	4–1	Paraguay U20s
18:00	Thiago Aguilera 30'; Harold Gutiérrez 31'; Dorian Fajardo 34'; José Lancea 38'	Report	Tobías Benitez 18'

10 August 2023	Chile U20s	3–6	Paraguay U20s
14:00	Iván Maldonado 6', 17'; Sebastián Olave 39'	Report	Samuel Ferreira 8', 14', 22'; Luciano Mareco 24'; Francisco Torales 34'; Jonatan Franco 38'

10 August 2023	Uruguay U20s	5–2	Bolivia U20s
18:00	Bruno Castro 10', 13', 25'; Pedro Benzo 31'; Luis Arrua 39'	Report	Thiago Aguilera 5'; Dorian Fajardo 19'

11 August 2023	Uruguay U20s	1–0	Chile U20s
14:00	Tomás Gallegos 27'	Report

11 August 2023	Paraguay U20s	1–3	Argentina U20s
18:00	Francisco Torales 8'	Report	Iván Alegre 5'; Tomas Acebedo 29'; Enzo Báez 36'

12 August 2023	Argentina U20s	5–2	Uruguay U20s
14:00	Franco Caruso 2'; Lautaro Yañez 3'; Nicolás Rosental 21'; Tomás Acebedo 22'; Enzo Báez 35'	Report	Luis Arrua 11', 15'

12 August 2023	Bolivia U20s	2–2	Chile U20s
18:00	Thiago Aguilera 10'; Yerko Bazan 14'	Report	Silfer Fernández 32'; Juan Rossel 35'

13 August 2023	Paraguay U20s	7–3	Uruguay U20s
14:00	Francisco Torales 10', 39'; Luciano Mareco 16'; Fabricio Vera 30', 40'; Marcio Ramírez 38'; Enrique Benítez 39'	Report	Bruno Castro 6', 18'; Luis Arrua 32'

13 August 2023	Bolivia U20s	1–1	Argentina U20s
18:00	Alexander Rosado 24'	Report	Enzo Báez 20'

== North zone ==
The north zone regular season event took place in Foz do Iguaçu. Brazil. All matches were hosted at the Ginásio de Esportes Costa Cavalcanti. It was organised in cooperation with the Brazilian Football Confederation (CBF). Brazil won the North zone for the third time.

=== Standings ===
==== Overall ====
Pos	Team	Pld	W	D	L	GF	GA	GD	Pts	Qualification
1	Team Brazil (H)	8	8	0	0	35	5	+30	24	Advance to the finals
2	Team Peru	8	4	1	3	17	18	−1	13	
3	Team Colombia	8	3	0	5	21	21	0	9	
4	Team Ecuador	8	2	1	5	17	35	−18	7	
5	Team Venezuela	8	1	2	5	15	26	−11	5	

(H) Hosts

==== Senior category ====
Pos	Team	Pld	W	D	L	GF	GA	GD	Pts
1	Brazil (H)	4	4	0	0	17	4	+13	12
2	Peru	4	2	1	1	7	6	+1	7
3	Colombia	4	2	0	2	9	8	+1	6
4	Venezuela	4	1	1	2	8	9	−1	4
5	Ecuador	4	0	0	4	6	20	−14	0

(H) Hosts

==== Under 20s category ====
Pos	Team	Pld	W	D	L	GF	GA	GD	Pts
1	Brazil (H)	4	4	0	0	18	1	+17	12
2	Ecuador	4	2	1	1	11	15	−4	7
3	Peru	4	2	0	2	10	12	−2	6
4	Colombia	4	1	0	3	12	13	−1	3
5	Venezuela	4	0	1	3	7	17	−10	1

(H) Hosts

=== Results ===
==== Senior category ====
8 November 2023	Colombia	3–2	Venezuela
16:15	Angellot Caro 12'; Erick Cruz 36'; Julián Pardo 39'	Report	Edgar Peña 24'; Víctor Carreño 40'

8 November 2023	Brazil	5–1	Ecuador
20:45	Deivão 6'; João Felipe 15'; Kaio Silva 23'; Gabriel Mendes 24'; Matheus Moura 37'	Report	Francisco Rosales 40'

9 November 2023	Peru	1–0	Colombia
16:15	Luis Ramos 6'	Report

8 November 2023	Venezuela	6–1	Ecuador
20:45	Juan Romero 3'; Michael Gelve 6'; Milton Francia 11', 40'; Jhonnieli Pérez 13'; Pedro Roque 27'	Report	Víctor Carreño 39' (o.g.)

10 November 2023	Ecuador	2–4	Peru
16:15	Dalember Segura 21'; Francisco Rosales 39'	Report	Junior Ulloa 17'; Xavier Tavera 17'; Jordy Rivera 23'; Eder Pérez 38'

10 November 2023	Brazil	5–0	Venezuela
20:45	João Felipe 2', 28'; Matheus Moura 7', 13'; Vanderson 20'	Report

11 November 2023	Colombia	5–2	Ecuador
16:15	Juan Uribe 14'; Jorge Cuervo 15'; Julián Pardo 17'; Luis Posadas 32'; Angellot Caro 39'	Report	Francisco Rosales 11'; Felipe Cortez 18'

11 November 2023	Peru	2–4	Brazil
20:45	Ángel Angulo 13'; Xavier Tavera 37'	Report	João Felipe 19' (pen.); Matheus Moura 34', 39'; Kaio Silva 35'

12 November 2023	Venezuela	0–0	Peru
16:00		Report

12 November 2023	Brazil	3–1	Colombia
20:00	Vanderson 33'; Hugo De Souza 36'; Joãozinho 39'	Report	Julián Pardo 2'

==== Under 20s category ====
8 November 2023	Colombia U20s	6–4	Venezuela U20s
14:00	Luis Dávila 12', 37'; Sebastián Toro 10', 38'; Douglas Garcia 10', 27'	Report	Osmeibe Ramos 2', 9'; Aaron Ruíz 34'; José Ledezma 38'

8 November 2023	Brazil U20s	8–0	Ecuador U20s
18:30	João Pedro 4', 28'; Thiaguinho 8'; Pedrinho 10', 34'; Hugo De Souza 11', 24'; Rafão 27'	Report

9 November 2023	Peru U20s	4–3	Colombia U20s
14:00	Denilson Zegarra 15', 38', 39'; Luis Julon 20'	Report	Ayiton Mazzo 17'; Sebastián Toro 24'; Josep Ávila 38'

9 November 2023	Venezuela U20s	2–2	Ecuador U20s
18:30	José Ledezma 9', 35'	Report	Jorge Cevallos 13'; Cristian Sánchez 40'

10 November 2023	Ecuador U20s	6–3	Peru U20s
14:00	Felipe Cortez 13', 32'; Stiven Soria 22'; Cristian Sánchez 25', 36'; Joan Ibarra 36'	Report	Alex Chinchay 15' (pen.); Ayiton Mazzo 36', 38'

10 November 2023	Brazil U20s	6–0	Venezuela U20s
18:30	Lucas Santos 10', 25'; João Pedro 16'; Alexandre Teixeira 17'; Pedrinho 21'; Hugo De Souza 38'	Report

11 November 2023	Colombia U20s	2–3	Ecuador U20s
14:00	Sebastián Toro 23'; Douglas Garcia 34'	Report	Bryan Zambrano 3'; Joan Ibarra 18'; Xavier Chiquito 21'

11 November 2023	Peru U20s	0–2	Brazil U20s
18:30		Report	Pedrinho 19'; Luciano Pereira 33'

12 November 2023	Venezuela U20s	1–3	Peru U20s
14:00	Aaron Ruíz 7'	Report	Luis Julon 3'; Denilson Zegarra 31'; Alex Chinchay 39'

12 November 2023	Brazil U20s	2–1	Colombia U20s
18:30	João Pedro 12'; Thiaguinho 26'	Report	Douglas García 40'

== Finals ==
The zone winners faced each other for the league title with their senior teams playing each other over two legs, as do their under 20s representatives for a total of four matches comprising the finals. The winners were the national team which accumulates the most points from all four matches combined.

The finals were organised to take place in Luque, Paraguay on 1 and 2 June 2024. All matches were played at the COP Arena – Estadio Óscar Harrison located within the Parque Olímpico sports complex.

Initially, the Estadio Ángel Malvicino in Santa Fe, Argentina was considered as a possible venue for the finals, however, this option was discarded because the stadium could not meet CONMEBOL's requirements.

=== Matches ===
All match times are local times, PYT (UTC−4), as listed by CONMEBOL.

1 June 2024
17:45

Argentina U20s	2–6	Brazil U20s
Rodrigo Álvarez 23'; Lucas Granada 26'	CONMEBOL; AFA	Thierry Henrique Petraça 2', 33'; Luis Silva 22'; Athirson Da Silva 32'; Paulo Nunes 32'; Vitor Springer 36'

COP Arena – Estadio Óscar Harrison
Referee: Bill Villalba (Paraguay)

Brazil earn three points; Brazil lead the series 3–0.

1 June 2024
20:00

Argentina	1–1	Brazil
Agustín del Rey 32'	CONMEBOL; AFA	Pedro Henrique 2'

COP Arena – Estadio Óscar Harrison
Referee: Diego Nisivoccia (Uruguay)

Argentina and Brazil earn one point each; Brazil lead the series 4–1.

2 June 2024
16:00

Brazil U20s	0–2	Argentina U20s
	CONMEBOL; AFA	Lautaro Yañez 13'; Rodrigo Álvarez 31'

COP Arena – Estadio Óscar Harrison
Referee: Carlos Martínez (Paraguay)

Argentina earn three points; series tied at 4–4.

2 June 2024
18:15

Brazil	2–1	Argentina
Pedro Henrique 3', 28'	CONMEBOL; AFA	Agustín del Rey 35'

COP Arena – Estadio Óscar Harrison
Referee: Daniel Rodríguez (Uruguay)

Brazil earn three points; Brazil won the series 7–4.

=== Winners ===
Brazil won the league to claim their fourth title in a row.

2023 CONMEBOL Futsal Evolution League
champions

Brazil
Fourth title

== See also ==
- 2023 South American Beach Soccer Evolution League
