= Poland women's national futsal team =

Poland
- Shirt badge/Association crest
- Nickname(s): Biało-czerwone (The white and reds); Orlice (The Eaglesses)
- Association: Polish Football Association (Polski Związek Piłki Nożnej)
- Confederation: UEFA (Europe)
- Head coach: Wojciech Weiss
- FIFA code: POL
- FIFA ranking: 20 ▼1 (24 September 2026)
- Highest FIFA ranking: 14 (29 August 2025)
- Lowest FIFA ranking: 17 (May 2024)
Home colours	Away colours

First international
- Poland 2–2 Czech Republic (Głogówek, Poland; 9 October 2013)

Biggest win
- Croatia 0–8 Poland (Poreč, Croatia; 13 June 2023)

Biggest defeat
- Spain 9–0 Poland (Krasnogorsk, Russia; 7 May 2016)

FIFA Futsal Women's World Cup
- Appearances: 1 (First in 2025)
- Best result: Group stage (2025)

The Poland women's national futsal team represents Poland in international women's futsal and is controlled by the Polish Football Association.

== History ==
The Poland women's national futsal team was established in February 2013. Piotr Siudziński, then coach of UKS Medan Gniezno, was appointed the team's first head coach by the Polish Football Association (PZPN) on 20 February 2013, with Wojciech Weiss serving as assistant coach. A month later, the team's first training camp was held in Racot, during which they played their first-ever unofficial match, defeating AFC Kościan 13–1. The first squad included goalkeepers Karolina Klabis and Angelika Tlałka, with a lineup of playmakers such as Milena Bączyk and Violetta Biegańska. In June 2013, the second camp was held in Siemiatycze in June 2013, where Poland registered victories over MKS Kresowiak-Orion Siemiatycze (13–1) and Tur Bielsk-Podlaski (34–0).

In October 2013, during the third camp in Głogówek, Poland played its first international matches against the Czech Republic, drawing the first 2–2 and winning the second 4–1. In November 2013, Poland faced Ukraine, ranked fifth globally, registering their first loss (3–5). On 26 February 2014, Poland played its first away international match in Pardubice, Czech Republic, winning 2–1, followed by a 3–2 win the next day.

Inactive until 2016, the team was brought back under coach Wojciech Weiss. Poland participated in the Victory Day Women's Cup in Russia, where they finished last, losing to Spain, Russia, and Iran. The team went on to win the Visegrad Group Tournaments in both 2016 and 2017.

In 2018, Poland competed in the inaugural UEFA Women's Futsal Championship qualifiers, finishing third in their group and missing qualification. The team returned to action in 2021 for the UEFA Women's Futsal Euro 2022 qualifiers but again fell short of qualifying, finishing second in their group behind Portugal.

In 2022, Poland participated in the Futsal Week tournament in Poreč, Croatia, securing victories over Finland and Hungary and drawing with Sweden and Croatia to win the tournament. That year, Poland also competed in the UEFA Women's Futsal Euro 2023 qualifiers held in Poznań due to the relocation from Ukraine. Poland finished third in the group, ultimately failing to qualify for the finals.

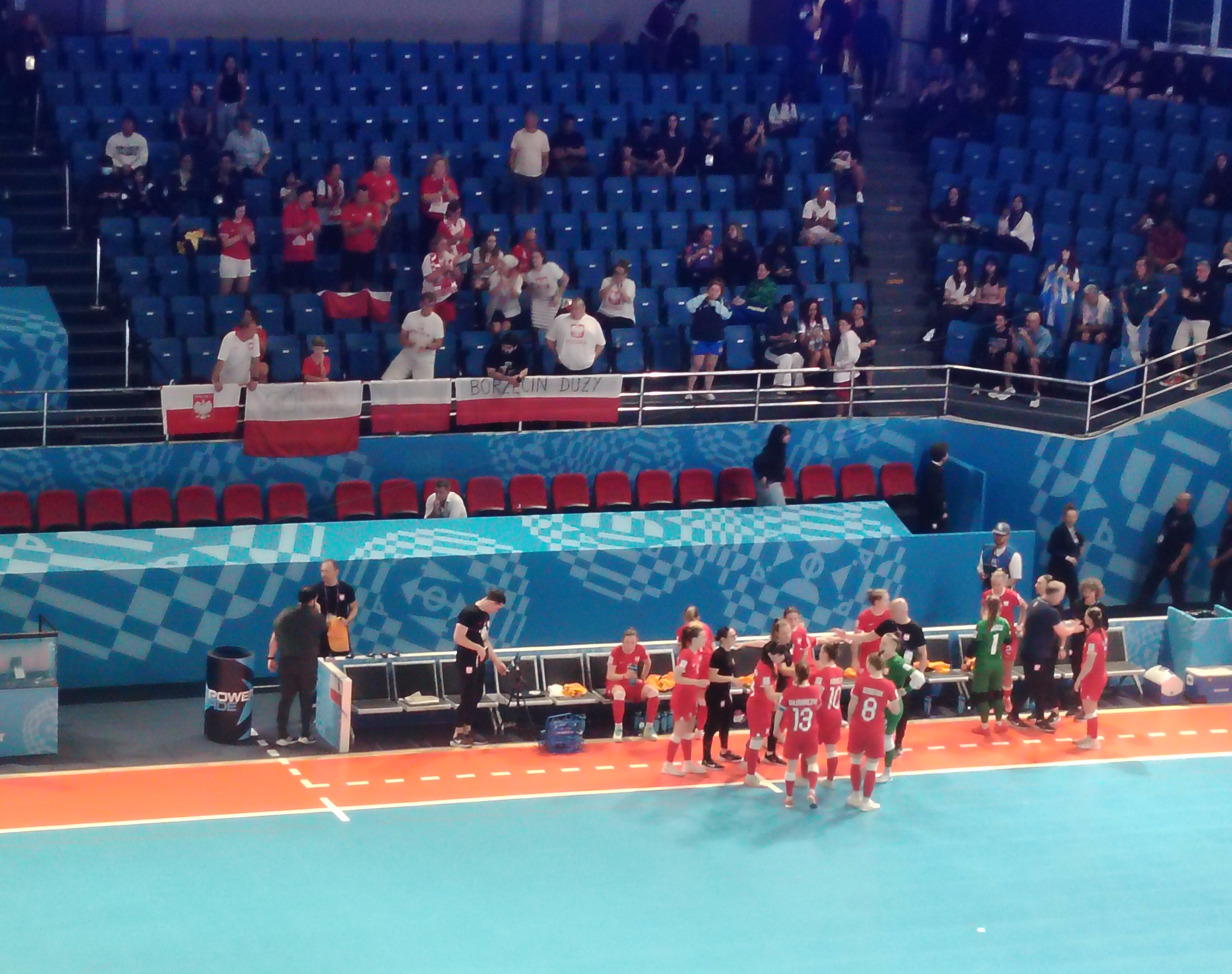
Poland at the 2025 FIFA Futsal Women's World Cup

In June 2023, Poland returned to Futsal Week, where they defeated Croatia, drew with Sweden, and lost to Italy. In a thrilling final, they beat Italy 3–2 to win the tournament. FIFA subsequently announced the inaugural FIFA Women's Futsal World Cup for 2025, In October 2024, Poland defeated the Netherlands 4–2 in their first-ever World Cup qualifier match, later advancing by beating Kazakhstan 7–0 to advance to the Elite round.

== Results and fixtures ==
- The following is a list of match results in the last 12 months, as well as any future matches that have been scheduled.

Legend

Win Draw Lose Fixture

=== 2023 ===
18 November Friendly	Hungary	0–2	Poland	Dunakeszi, Hungary

19 November Friendly	Hungary	0–1	Poland	Dunakeszi, Hungary

=== 2024 ===
11 June Futsal Week Summer Cup	Poland	12–1	Greenland	Poreč, Croatia

13 June Futsal Week Summer Cup	Italy	3–2	Poland	Poreč, Croatia

15 June Futsal Week Summer Cup	Poland	4–2	Finland	Poreč, Croatia

16 June Futsal Week Summer Cup	Italy	3–2	Poland	Poreč, Croatia

10 September Friendly	Poland	6–0	France	Kraków, Poland

11 September Friendly	Poland	7–2	France	Kraków, Poland

18 October 2025 World Cup Qualifying	Poland	4–2	Netherlands	Astana, Kazakhstan

19 October 2025 World Cup Qualifying	Kazakhstan	0–7	Poland	Astana, Kazakhstan

=== 2025 ===
November 21 2025 FIFA Futsal Women's World Cup	Philippines	0–6	Poland	Pasig, Philippines
20:30 UTC+8		Report	Basta 6'19", 23'55"; Matuszewska 18'18"; Szostak 22'18"; Ortillo 25'50", o.g.; Dymińska 29'53"	Stadium: PhilSports Arena; Attendance: 2,211; Referee: Anelize Schulz (Brazil)

November 24 2025 FIFA Futsal Women's World Cup	Argentina	3–2	Poland	PhilSports Arena, Pasig
18:00	Nava 8'04"; Chiesa 10'32"; Rossi 14'02"	Report	Bała 21'48"; Chóras 38'24"	Attendance: 955; Referee: Liang Qingyun (China)

November 27 2025 FIFA Futsal Women's World Cup	Poland	0–1	Morocco	PhilSports Arena, Pasig
18:00		Report	Demraoui 28'13"	Attendance: 1,125; Referee: Valeria Palma (Chile)

== Players ==
=== Current squad ===
- The following players were named for the 2025 FIFA Futsal Women's World Cup qualifiers main round against Netherlands and Kazakhstan on 18 and 19 October 2024.

No.	Pos.	Player	Date of birth (age)	Club
1	GK	Andzelika Dąbek	22 June 1992 (age 34)	(Polish Football Association) Biedrzychowice Głogówek
12	GK	Natalia Majewska	24 September 2004 (age 22)	(Polish Football Association) Rekord Bielsko Biała
3	DF	Maja Szydełko	16 February 2003 (age 23)	(Polish Football Association) UAM Poznań
6	DF	Zuzanna Maronde	23 February 2003 (age 23)	(Polish Football Association) UJ Kraków
7	DF	Agata Bała	6 February 1998 (age 28)	(Polish Football Association) Nowy Świt Górzno
10	DF	Klaudia Kubaszek	29 May 1998 (age 28)	(Italian Football Federation) V.I.P. Calcio a 5
14	DF	Natalia Matuszewska	21 September 2005 (age 21)	(Polish Football Association) Nowy Świt Górzno
2	FW	Paula Fronczak	22 April 1992 (age 34)	(Polish Football Association) UAM Poznań
5	FW	Agata Sobkowicz	28 June 1995 (age 31)	(Polish Football Association) Biedrzychowice Głogówek
8	FW	Julia Szostak	22 January 2000 (age 26)	(Italian Football Federation) V.I.P. Calcio a 5
9	FW	Julia Basta	16 October 2001 (age 24)	(Polish Football Association) Słomniczanka Słomniki
11	FW	Wiktoria Pietrzyk	13 December 2000 (age 25)	(Polish Football Association) Słomniczanka Słomniki
13	FW	Katarzyna Włodarczyk	27 April 1999 (age 27)	(Polish Football Association) Słomniczanka Słomniki
16	FW	Nadia Palkiewicz	21 June 2005 (age 21)	(Polish Football Association) Słomniczanka Słomniki

== Competitive record ==
=== FIFA Futsal Women's World Cup ===
FIFA Futsal Women's World Cup record									Qualification record					
Year	Round	Position	Pld	W	D*	L	GF	GA	Pld	W	D*	L	GF	GA
(Philippines) 2025	Group stage	TBD	3	1	0	2	8	4	2	2	0	0	11	2
Total	Best: —	1/1	—	—	—	—	—	—	2	2	0	0	11	2
* Draws include knockout matches decided on penalty kicks.

=== UEFA Women's Futsal Championship ===
UEFA Women's Futsal Championship record									Qualifying record					
Year	Round	Position	Pld	W	D*	L	GF	GA	Pld	W	D*	L	GF	GA
(Portugal) 2019	Did not qualify								3	1	0	2	5	16
(Portugal) 2022	Did not qualify								3	2	0	1	14	10
(Hungary) 2023	Did not qualify								3	1	1	1	4	3
2027	Qualified								3	2	1	0	13	3
Total	Best:	1/4	—	—	—	—	—	—	12	6	2	4	36	32
* Draws include knockout matches decided on penalty kicks.

=== Other tournaments ===
Tournament	Round	Position	Pld	W	D*	L	GF	GA
(Russia) 2016 Victory Day Women's Cup	Fourth place	4th of 4	3	0	0	3	2	17
(Czech Republic) 2016 Ostrava Four nations Tournament	Champions	1st of 4	3	1	2	0	7	4
(Hungary) 2017 Budaörs Tri-nations Tournament	Champions	1st of 3	2	1	0	1	4	2
(Russia) 2018 Victory Day Women's Cup	Third place	3rd of 4	3	1	0	2	6	12
(Czech Republic) 2018 Ostrava Tri-nations Tournament	Runners-up	2nd of 3	2	1	1	0	3	2
(Croatia) 2019 Futsal Week Summer Cup	Runners-up	2nd of 4	3	2	0	1	8	9
(Croatia) 2022 Futsal Week Summer Cup	Champions	1st of 5	4	2	2	0	7	4
(Sweden) 2022 Alingsås Tri-nations Tournament	Third place	3rd of 3	2	0	0	2	4	7
(Croatia) 2023 Futsal Week Summer Cup	Champions	1st of 4	4	2	1	1	13	7
(Croatia) 2024 Futsal Week Summer Cup	Runners-up	2nd of 6	4	2	0	2	20	9
* Draws include knockout matches decided on penalty kicks.

== See also ==
- Futsal in Poland
- Poland women's national football team
