= Javier Fuentealba =

Chilean futsal player

Personal information
- Full name: Javier Eduardo Fuentealba Verdejo
- Date of birth: 9 November 2001 (age 24)
- Place of birth: Chile
- Position: Forward

Team information
- Current team: We-Met Gmina Sierakowice

Senior career*
Years	Team	Apps	(Gls)
2020	San Antonio Unido		
2021	Deportes Melipilla		
2022–2024	Newell's Old Boys		
2024	→ Barracas Central (loan)		
2025	FC Kingersheim		
2025	Cerro Porteño		
2025–2026	AD Fundão		
2026–	We-Met Gmina Sierakowice		

International career
2022–	Chile		
- * Club domestic league appearances and goals

Javier Eduardo Fuentealba Verdejo (born 9 November 2001) is a Chilean futsal player who plays as a pivot for Ekstraklasa club We-Met Gmina Sierakowice and the Chile national team.

== Career ==
Fuentealba started his career with the futsal teams of San Antonio Unido and Deportes Melipilla in his homeland.

In March 2022, Fuentealba moved to Argentine and joined Newell's Old Boys, In 2024, he was loaned to Barracas Central, with whom he won the Liga Nacional and the Copa de Oro.

In January 2025, Fuentealba moved to Europe and joined French club FC Kingersheim. In April of the year, he returned to South America and joined Paraguayan club Cerro Porteño to compete at the 2025 Copa Libertadores.

In July 2025, Fuentealba moved back to Europe and signed with Liga Placard club AD Fundão. The next year, he moved to Poland to play for We-Met Gmina Sierakowice.

== International career ==
Fuentealba made his debut with the Chile national team in 2022. Since then, he has been a permanent member of the squad in tournaments such as the Copa América, a tour in Argentina, the CONMEBOL Evolution League, among others.

== Personal life ==
He is nicknamed Chino (Chinese) due to his resemblance to Asian people.
