= Futsal in Poland =

Futsal is a quickly growing sport in Poland. The national futsal team was created in 1992 by the Polish Football Association. Among coaches of it, there were such names as Janusz Kupcewicz and Michal Globisz. In 2001 Poland won promotion to the final tournament of European Championships in Moscow and two years later, a youth national team was created, as well as a student national team. Polish Futsal Ekstraklasa currently (2008) consists of 12 teams and the 2007–2008 champion is PA Nova Gliwice. There also is the Second Division, which consists of two groups and the Third Division, with two groups as well. In 2007, the Women's Futsal Ekstraklasa was created, with six teams.

Polish Men's Futsal Ekstraklasa consists of the following teams:

- PA Nova Gliwice,
- Jango Katowice,
- Gaszynscy Kraków,
- Jachym Tychy,
- Hurtap Łęczyca,
- Kupczyk Darkomp Kraków,
- Akademia Poznań,
- Clearex Chorzów,
- Red Devils Chojnice,
- Pogoń Szczecin,
- Grembach Zgierz,
- Gwiazda Ruda Śląska.
