= Greenland women's national futsal team =

Greenland
- Shirt badge/Association crest
- Association: Football Association of Greenland
- Head coach: David Bror Janussen
- Home stadium: Inussivik
- FIFA code: GRL

First international
- Greenland 1–12 Poland (Poreč, Croatia; 11 June 2024)

Biggest defeat
- Greenland 0–13 Italy (Poreč, Croatia; 12 June 2024)

The Greenland women's national futsal team is controlled by the Football Association of Greenland, the governing body for futsal in Greenland, and represents the country in international futsal competitions. It is not a member of FIFA or UEFA and can, therefore, not compete in official competitions of those governing bodies.

== History ==
As part of an emphasis on prioritizing women's football and increasing the number of female players in Greenland, the Football Association of Greenland established a women's national team in 2021 with the goal of touring internationally the following year. The federation named and Bent Petersen as first-ever head coach and Inunnguaq Geronne as assistant coach. By March 2022, the team had traveled to Denmark to compete against club teams, but could not challenge the Danes because Denmark did not have a women's national team. The trip included victories over some of the country's best youth clubs, including B.93 and Solrød FC.

The team took part in an official international competition for the first time in June 2024 as part of a six-team Futsal Week tournament in Croatia. Greenland opened the competition with a debut 1–12 defeat to Poland on 11 June 2024. That result was followed up by 0–13 defeat to Italy. The team's third match ended as a 4–11 defeat to Iran. In the second match of the placement play-off series, Greenland were narrowly defeated again by Morocco, this time by a scoreline of 5–7 to earn sixth place in the team's first international outing.

== All-time fixtures and results ==
11 June 2024 2024 Futsal Week Women's June Cup	Poland	12–1	Greenland	Poreč, Croatia
		Report		Stadium: Finida Hall

12 June 2024 2024 Futsal Week Women's June Cup	Italy	13–0	Greenland	Poreč, Croatia
		Report		Stadium: Finida Hall

15 June 2024 2024 Futsal Week Women's June Cup	Morocco	11–4	Greenland	Poreč, Croatia
		Report		Stadium: Finida Hall

16 June 2024 2024 Futsal Week Women's June Cup	Morocco	7–5	Greenland	Poreč, Croatia
		Report		Stadium: Finida Hall

== Current squad ==
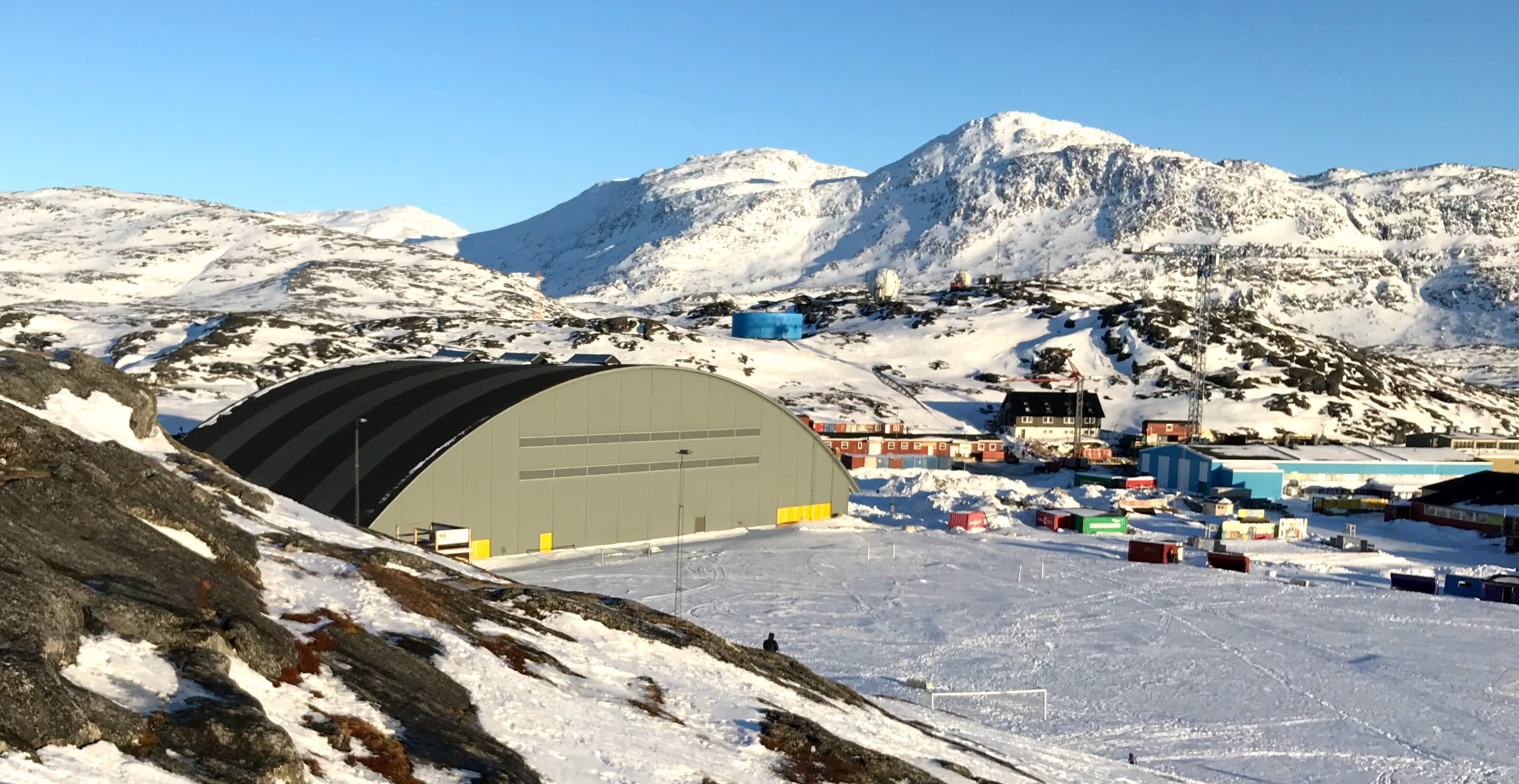
The team plays its home matches at the Inussivik in Nuuk, Greenland's capital

The following players were called up for the Futsal Week in June 2024.

- 1 Arnaalunnguaq Møller
- 2 Arnarissoq Møller
- 3 Karoline Malakiassen
- 5 Laila Platou
- 6 Patricia Semionsen
- 7 Emma Thomsen
- 8 Aviana Bjerregaard
- 9 Manumina Reimer
- 10 Inger Thomassen
- 13 Mikkala Tobiassen
- 14 Arnaq B. Egede
- 16 Olga Mikaelsen
- 17 Freja Frederiksen
- 52 Heidi M. Jensen
