= Croatia women's national futsal team =

Croatia
- Association: Croatian Football Federation
- Confederation: UEFA (Europe)
- Head coach: Luka Marinović
- Captain: Andrea Telišman
- Most caps: Tihaba Nemčić (6); Tomislava Matijević (6); Andrea Telišman (6)
- Top scorer: Tomislava Matijević (15)
- FIFA code: CRO
- FIFA ranking: 39 ▲2 (12 December 2025)
Home colours	Away colours

First international
- Croatia 6–2 Slovenia (Karlovac, Croatia; September 12, 2018)

Biggest win
- Moldova 0–8 Croatia (Varaždin, Croatia; June 28, 2019)

Biggest defeat
- Croatia 1–16 Portugal (Karlovac, Croatia; October 23, 2021)

European Championship
- Appearances: 0

The Croatia women's national futsal team represents Croatia during international futsal competitions and is controlled by the Croatian Football Federation and represents the country in women's international futsal competitions, such as the European Championships.

== Results ==
=== FIFA Futsal Women's World Cup ===
FIFA Futsal Women's World Cup record
Year	Round	Position	GP	W	D	L	GS	GA
Philippines 2025	Did not qualify							
Total	–	0/1	0	0	0	0	0	0

=== UEFA European Women's Futsal Championship ===
UEFA European Women's Futsal Championship Record
Year	Round	Pld	W	D	L	GS	GA	DIF
Portugal 2019	Did not qualify	-	-	-	-	-	-	-
TBD 2022	Did not qualify	-	-	-	-	-	-	-
Total	0/2	-	-	-	-	-	-	-

== Players ==
=== Current squad ===
Squad for 2022 qualifiers

No.	Pos.	Player	Date of birth (age)	Caps	Goals	Club
1	GK	Nikolina Severinski	29			(Croatian Football Federation) Alumnus Sesvete
12	GK	Andrea Telišman	30			(Croatian Football Federation) Alumnus Sesvete
13	DF	Valentina Stipančević	29			(Croatian Football Federation) Alumnus Sesvete
4	DF	Lucija Svorcina	23			(Croatian Football Federation) MC Plus
5	DF	Petra Barbir	27			(Croatian Football Federation) Super Chicks
7	DF	Marijana Orešić	28			(Croatian Football Federation) Alumnus Sesvete
10	DF	Sandra Brkan	31			(Italian Football Federation) Ragusa
9	MF	Tomislava Matijević	28			(Italian Football Federation) Molfetta
18	MF	Gabrijela Gaiser	26			(Croatian Football Federation) Alumnus Sesvete
2	MF	Sara Bučić	22			(Croatian Football Federation) MC Plus
6	FW	Sandra Trstenjak	28			(Croatian Football Federation) Alumnus Sesvete
11	FW	Marija Žagar	24			(Croatian Football Federation) Dinamo

== Record against other teams ==
As of 21 December 2021

Key
Positive total balance (more wins)
Neutral total balance (equal W/L ratio)
Negative total balance (more losses)

National team	Total				UEFA European Championship				Qualifications				Friendlies			
National team	Pld	W	D	L	Pld	W	D	L	Pld	W	D	L	Pld	W	D	L
Italy	1	0	0	1	—	—	—	—	0	0	0	0	1	0	0	1
Moldova	1	1	0	0	—	—	—	—	0	0	0	0	1	1	0	0
Poland	2	0	0	2	—	—	—	—	1	0	0	1	1	0	0	1
Portugal	1	0	0	1	—	—	—	—	1	0	0	1	0	0	0	0
Russia	0	0	0	1	—	—	—	—	1	0	0	1	0	0	0	0
Slovenia	2	2	0	0	—	—	—	—	2	2	0	0	0	0	0	0
Sweden	1	1	0	0	—	—	—	—	1	1	0	0	0	0	0	0
Total (7)	9	4	0	5	—	—	—	—	6	3	0	3	3	1	0	2

=== Biggest Wins ===
European Championship	Qualifications	Friendlies
—	+4 vs. Slovenia (6–2) 2018; +1 vs. Slovenia (2–1) 2021; +1 vs. Sweden (3–2) 2018	+8 vs. Moldova (8-0) 2019

=== Biggest Losses ===
European Championship	Qualifications	Friendlies
—	-15 vs. Portugal (1-16) 2021; -9 vs. Russia (0–9) 2018; -4 vs. Poland (1–5) 2021	-3 vs. Italy (4–7) 2019; -1 vs. Poland(4–5) 2019
